= Hummingbird discography =

This page lists the albums recorded by the rock band Hummingbird, which was formed by Bobby Tench and included other former members of The Jeff Beck Group. All three albums were produced by Ian Samwell.

== Hummingbird ==
Hummingbird
- Hummingbird (Japanese re-issue 2007)

Studio album by Hummingbird
- Released: 1 January 1975 (UK); July 1975 (US)
- Recorded: July 1973–October 1974
- Genre: Rock
- Labels: A&M, Universal
- Producer: Ian "Sammy" Samwell

Hummingbird chronology
Hummingbird (1975)	We Can't Go On Meeting Like This (1976)

Professional ratings
Review scores
Source	Rating
Allmusic	3/5 stars

Hummingbird was the first of three albums recorded by the British rock band Hummingbird. The album was produced by Ian "Sammy" Samwell.

With initial interest from Apple Records and CBS, the band started work on this album in mid July 1973. At this stage Jeff Beck took part in minor sessions with the band, but this did not develop into a final contribution. After signing to A&M they transferred to Island studios to finish off the album during September and October 1974. In 1975, Jeff Beck released his Blow by Blow album and performed a Bernie Holland track, Diamond Dust.

Track listing

1. "Music Flowing" (Isidore)
2. "You Can Keep the Money"
3. "Such a Long Ways" (Isidore)
4. "Horrors" (Holland)
5. "I Don't Know Why I Love You" (Hardaway, Hunter, Riser, Wonder)
6. "Maybe" (Chaman, Finesilver, Middleton, Tench)
7. "For the Children's Sake" (Isidore)
8. "Ocean Blues" (Isidore)
9. "Island of Dreams" (Isidore)

Credits

- Bobby Tench - guitar, lead vocals
- Bernie Holland - guitar
- Clive Chaman - bass
- Max Middleton - keyboards
- Conrad Isidore - drums
- Linda Lewis - backing vocals

Original release

- AMLS 68292 (1975)

Reissues

- Universal 93243 (2007)
- Umvd Import 93243 (2007)

Singles

- "For the Children's Sake" /"You can keep your money" A&M AMS 7193 (1975)

== We Can't Go On Meeting Like This ==
We Can't Go On Meeting Like This
- We can't go on meeting like this (Japanese re-issue 2007)

Studio album by Hummingbird
- Released: 1976
- Genre: Rock
- Labels: A&M, Universal
- Producer: Ian "Sammy" Samwell

Hummingbird chronology
Hummingbird (1975)	We Can't Go On Meeting Like This (1976)	Diamond Nights (1977)

Professional ratings
Review scores
Source	Rating
Allmusic	AMG album pick

We Can't Go On Meeting Like This was the second of three albums recorded by the band. This was the first album with Bernard "Pretty" Purdie as drummer and was produced by Ian "Sammy" Samwell. Max Middleton and Robert Ahwai would later go on to work with Chris Rea.

Track listing

1. "Fire and Brimstone"
2. "Gypsy Skys"
3. "Trouble Maker"
4. "Scorpio"
5. "We Can't Go on Meeting Like This" (Bobby Tench, Ian Samwell, Max Middleton)
6. "The City Mouse"
7. "A Friend Forever"
8. "Heaven Knows" (Bobby Tench, Ian Samwell)
9. "Snake Shack"
10. "Let It Burn"

Credits

- Bobby Tench - guitar, vocals
- Bernie Holland - guitar
- Robert Ahwai - guitar
- Clive Chaman - bass
- Max Middleton - keyboards
- Bernard "Pretty" Purdie - drums
- Liza Strike - backing vocals
- Madeline Bell - backing vocals
- Joanne Williams - backing vocals

Original release

- A&M AMLH 68383 UK
- A&M 4595 US (1976)

Reissues

- Universal 93244 (2007)
- Umvd Import 93244 (2007)

Singles

- "Trouble maker"/"Gypsy Skies" A&M AMS 7254 (1976)

== Diamond Nights ==
Diamond Nights
- Diamond Nights (Japanese re-issue 2007)

Studio album by Hummingbird
- Released: 1977
- Genre: Rock
- Labels: A&M, Universal
- Producer: Ian "Sammy" Samwell

Hummingbird chronology
We Can't go on Meeting Like This (1976)	Diamond Nights (1977)

Professional ratings
Review scores
Source	Rating
Allmusic	Allmusic

Diamond Nights was the third and final album recorded by the British rock band Hummingbird. The album was produced by Ian "Sammy" Samwell.

Track listing

1. "Got My Led Boots On"
2. "Spirit (Tench/Chapman)
3. "Cryin' for My Love" (Lindsey/Seals)
4. "She Is My Lady"
5. "You Can't Hide Love" (Scarborough)
6. "Anaconda"
7. "Madatcha" (Tench/Chapman)
8. "Losing You"
9. "Spread Your Wings"
10. "Anna's Song"

Credits

- Bobby Tench-guitar, vocals
- Robert Ahwai-guitar
- Clive Chaman-bass
- Max Middleton-keyboards
- Bernard Purdie -drums
- Pancho Morales-percussion
- Airto Moreira-percussion
- Quitman Dennis-horn
- Chuck Findley-horn
- Jim Horn-woodwind
- Lisa Freeman Roberts-vocals (bgd)
- Paulette McWilliams-vocals (bgd)
- Venetta Fields-vocals (bgd)
- Stephanie Spruill-vocals (bgd)
- Julia Tillman Waters-vocals (bgd)
- Maxine Willard Waters-vocals (bgd)
- Trey Aven-original album cover art

Original release

- A&M AMLHI 644661 UK (1976)
- SP 4661 USA (1976)

Reissues

- CD Universal 93245 (2007)

Singles

- "Madatcha"/"Anna's song" A&M AMS 7325(1977)
