= Hanson (British band) =

British-based

- Origin: England, UK
- Genres: Progressive rock; Funk rock
- Years active: 1973–1974
- Labels: Manticore; Ork
- Past members: Junior Hanson; Delisle Harper; Rebop Kwaku Baah; Godfrey McLean; Neil Murray; Clive Chaman; Jean Roussel

Hanson (also known as Junior Marvin's Hanson) were a British-based Rock band formed by Junior Hanson in 1973 and Hanson would later join Bob Marley and the Wailers. The band signed to Emerson, Lake & Palmer's Manticore Records. Their debut album Now Hear This, was released in 1973. This album featured Bobby Tench and Jean Roussel. At the beginning of 1974, Junior Marvin disbanded the existing line-up and reformed the band for the recording of the album Magic Dragon, which was released later that year.

Hanson disbanded after the second album and Marvin Hanson went on to session work for Island records before joining Bob Marley and the Wailers.

== Influencial guitar sound ==
Marvin Hanson used a fuzzbox guitar effect when recording with the band and in session work. This sound was noticed by The Wailers. Marvin’s use of this effect became an integral part of the Bob Marley and the Wailers’ sound on songs on their album Exodus and other songs, after he joined them.

== First album ==
Now Hear This

Studio album by Hanson (UK)
- Released: 1973
- Recorded: 1973
- Genre: Funk rock
- Label: Manticore
- Producer: Junior Hanson and Big "M" Mario Medious

Hanson (UK) chronology
Now Hear This (1973)	Magic Dragon (1974)

=== Track listing ===
1-Traveling Like a Gypsy 6:15
2-Love Knows Everything 3:08
3-Mister Music Maker 4:27
4-Catch That Beat 3:48
5-Take You into My Home 3:11
6-Gospel Truth 5:03
7-Rain 5:10
8-Smokin to the Big M 9:53

=== Credits ===
- Junior Hanson - guitar and lead vocals; backing vocals on "Love Knows Everything" and "Take You Into My Home"; bass guitar on "Rain"
- Jean Roussel - electric piano, organ, clavinet, Mini-Moog synthesizer; piano on "Gospel Truth"
- Clive Chaman - bass guitar on all tracks except for "Love Knows Everything" and "Rain"
- Conrad Isidore - drums on all tracks except for "Love Knows Everything"

=== Additional Information ===
- Jimmy Thomas-superstring; backing vocals on "Take You Into My Home", "Rain" and "Smoking to the Big 'M'"
- Rebop Kwaku Baah-congas
- Bobby Tench-backing vocals on "Love Knows Everything", "Gospel Truth", "Rain" and guitar on "Catch That Beat"
- Godfrey McLean-drums and backing vocals on "Love Knows Everything"
- Delisle Harper-bass guitar on "Love Knows Everything"
- Chris Wood-flute on "Mister Music Maker"
- Ken Cumberbatch-piano on "Catch That Beat"

== Second album ==
Magic Dragon

Studio album by Hanson (UK)
- Released: 1974
- Recorded: 1974
- Genre: Funk rock
- Label: Manticore
- Producer: Junior Hanson and Big "M" Mario Medious

Hanson (UK) chronology
Now Hear This (1973)	''Magic Dragon'' (1974)

=== Track listing ===
1-Rocking Horseman (John Burns) 3:32
2-Modern Day Religion (Hanson/Cumberbatch) 3:10
3-Down into the Magic (Hanson/Cumberbatch) 5:26
4-Rock Me Baby (B.B. King/Joe Josea) 3:50
5-Love Yer, Need You (Hanson/Murray/Glen/Brother James) 4:59
6-Boy Meets Girl (Cassandra) 3:05
7-American Beauty Rose (Hanson/Cumberbatch) 3:05
8-Looking at Tin Soldiers (Hanson) 3:44
9-Magic Dragon (Hanson/Cumberbatch) 2:58

=== Credits ===
- Junior Hanson — electric guitar, lead vocals; acoustic guitar (track 3)
- Neil Murray — bass
- Glen LeFleur — drums; percussion (track 1)
- Brother James — congas; percussion (tracks 1, 3, 6, 7)
- Cassandra — backing vocals (track 2)
- Marlo Henderson — electric guitar (tracks 1, 2, 6)
- Andre Lewis — clavinet (tracks 1,8), organ (tracks 3,6)*The Big 'M' — voice of the company sergeant (track 8)
