= Rough and Ready (album) =

Studio album by The Jeff Beck Group
- Released: 25 October 1971
- Recorded: April–July 1971
- Studios: Island, London
- Genres: Jazz rock; Blues Rock; Electric Blues
- Length: 36:48
- Label: Epic
- Producer: Jeff Beck

The Jeff Beck Group chronology
Beck-Ola (1969)	Rough and Ready (1971)	Jeff Beck Group (1972)

Rough and Ready is the third studio album by the Jeff Beck Group and the first of two by the second Jeff Beck Group. Released in 1971 by Epic Records, it featured more of a jazz, soul and R&B edge to counter Beck's lead guitar. As a songwriter, Beck contributed more pieces to Rough and Ready than he had before, or ever would again. Beck enlisted Bobby Tench as vocalist and it is also the first time keyboardist Max Middleton is heard. Other members of this line up are drummer Cozy Powell and bassist Clive Chaman.

== History ==
In early April 1970, and still signed to RAK, Jeff Beck reformed The Jeff Beck Group with keyboardist Max Middleton, drummer Cozy Powell and bassist Clive Chaman and vocalist Alex Ligertwood. Later in April that same year, the new band began recording sessions at Island Studios in London. They worked on songs by Beck and focused on "Situation", which had lyrics by Ligertwood. Other songs such as "Morning Dew" (previously heard on Beck's album Truth) were given attention, with the help of producer Jimmy Miller, who had worked with Traffic and with The Rolling Stones.

During May 1971, after a week of recording sessions, Beck left RAK and signed a new record deal with CBS. Epic, a subsidiary of CBS, was assigned to release Beck's work, and having heard the Island studio tapes were not happy with the vocals. During May, Beck started looking for a new vocalist. In late May, after hearing Bobby Tench perform with his band Gass, he employed him as vocalist for the band. Tench was given only a few weeks to write new lyrics and add his vocals to the album, before mixing resumed on tracks previously recorded by Beck and the other band members. During early July 1971, the band returned to Island Studios to finish the album and Beck took over as producer. Rough and Ready was released in UK on 25 October 1971 with the US release following during February 1972. A sixteen-day promotional tour in USA followed, and the album eventually reached #46 in the album charts.

== Critical reception ==
Professional ratings
Review scores
Source	Rating
AllMusic	3.5/5 stars
The Rolling Stone Album Guide	3/5 stars
The Village Voice	C+

In a contemporary review for The Village Voice, music critic Robert Christgau found Tench's singing pretentious and the songs tedious: "Despite some superb textures, this is as sloppy and self-indulgent as ever." Roy Carr, writing in NME, felt that the album "falls into that trap whereby the performance far exceeds the material. Beck hasn't lost any of his fire as he rips off solo after solo with flashy confidence". On the other hand, Rolling Stone magazine's Stephen Davis said that "Rough and Ready" is "a surprising, fine piece of work from a man who wasn’t really expected to come back." Derek Johnson "of NME reviewed the single "Got the Feeling" positively and called it "an excellent disc combining a strong commercial element with an altogether more progressive approach".

Rough and Ready finished 23rd in the voting for the best album of 1971 in the Pazz & Jop, an annual critics poll run by The Village Voice.

== Track listing ==
Side one
No.	Title	Writer(s)	Length
1.	"Got the Feeling"	Jeff Beck	4:46
2.	"Situation"	Beck	5:26
3.	"Short Business"	Beck	2:34
4.	"Max's Tune: On original United States releases, this track is titled "Raynes Park Blues" and credited to Beck; subsequent pressings are titled and credited as above."	Max Middleton	8:24
Total length:			21:03

Side two
No.	Title	Writer(s)	Length
5.	"I've Been Used"	Beck	3:40
6.	"New Ways / Train Train"	Beck	5:52
7.	"Jody"	Beck, Brian Short	6:06
Total length:			15:34

== Band members ==
- Jeff Beck – guitars, production
- Bob Tench – vocals
- Max Middleton – keyboards, piano
- Clive Chaman – bass guitar
- Cozy Powell – drums

== Charts ==
Chart (1971–1972)	Peak position
Canada Top Albums/CDs (RPM)	35
Japanese Albums (Oricon)	56
US Billboard 200	46

== Discography ==
=== Original release ===
- Epic KE-30973 1972

=== Reissues ===
- Epic EK-30973 (1990)
- Epic PET-30973 (1990)
- Epic MHCP583 (2005)
- Sony 4710472 (2006)
- Sony Japan 960 (2007)
- Epic EPC40-64619 Cassette (US)

== Singles ==
- "Got that Feeling" / "Situation" Epic(US) 5-10814 (6 December 1971), Epic (UK) 7720 (7 January 1972)
