= Max Middleton =

English composer and keyboardist (born 1946)

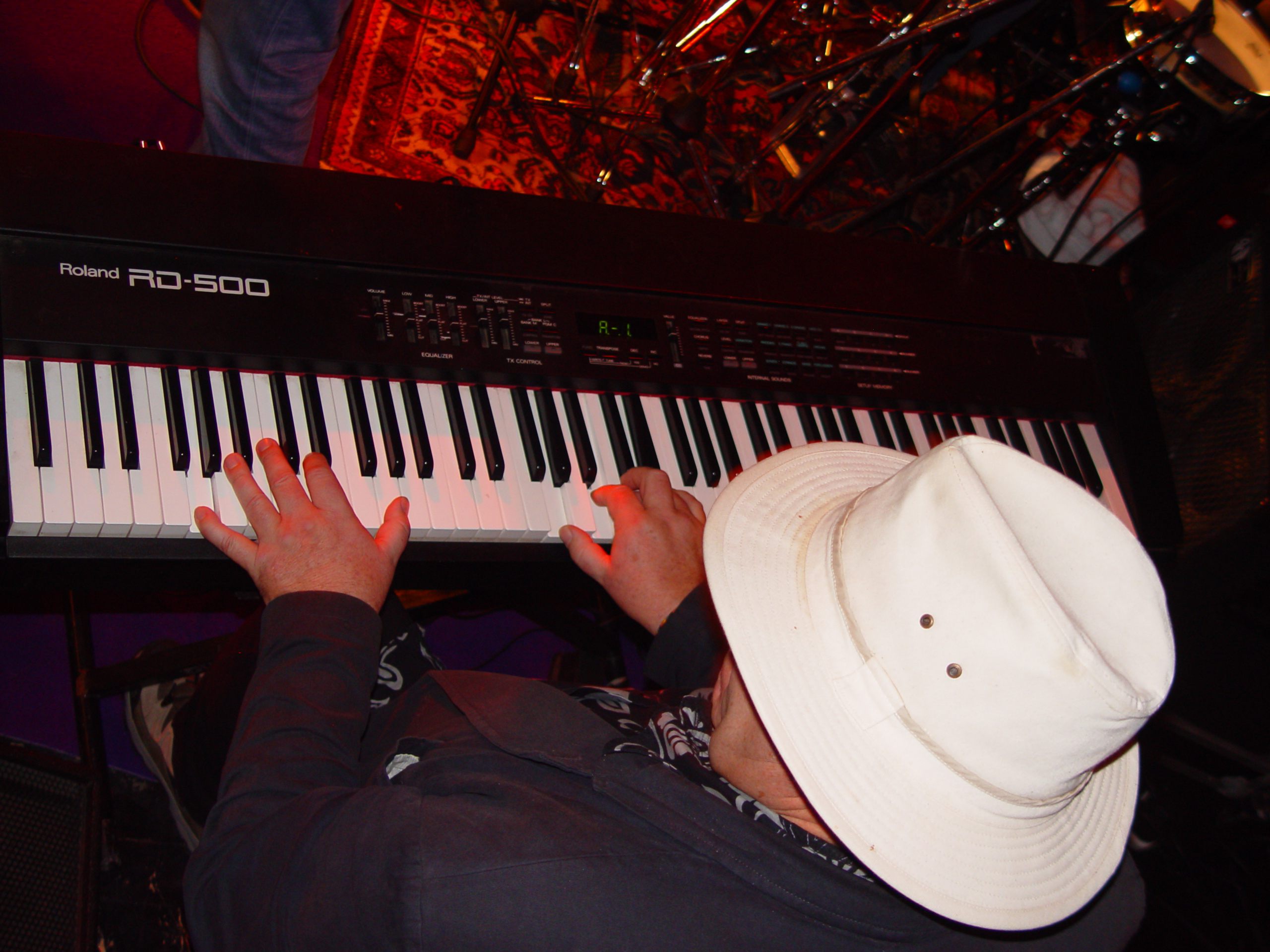
- Middleton with Snowy White & The White Flames performing in Germany (1 November 2007)

Background information
- Born: David Maxwell Middleton; 4 August 1946 (age 80); Amersham, Buckinghamshire, England
- Genres: Blues rock; rock; melodic rock
- Occupations: Musician; composer
- Instrument: Keyboards
- Years active: 1966–present
- Labels: Epic; A&M; Atco; RCA; RL-2
- Website: www.maxmiddleton.com

David Maxwell Middleton (born 4 August 1946) is an English composer and keyboardist. Trained as a classical pianist, Middleton also had a strong affinity for jazz. He is known for his work on the Fender Rhodes electric piano and the Minimoog synthesiser, and for his percussive playing style on the Hohner Clavinet. He started his professional music career by playing keyboards for Jeff Beck and is best known for his work on Beck's Blow by Blow (1975).

== Career ==
After being introduced to Beck by bassist Clive Chaman during 1970, he played keyboards on the third Jeff Beck Group album Rough and Ready and the eponymously named fourth Jeff Beck Group album (also known as the "Orange Album"), in a line-up with Chaman, vocalist and guitarist Bobby Tench and drummer Cozy Powell. He went on to record Blow by Blow and Wired with Jeff Beck and to record and tour with Nazareth, Hummingbird, Streetwalkers, Chris Rea, Kate Bush, Annette Peacock, Rolling Stones guitarist Mick Taylor and singer-songwriter John Martyn.

Middleton worked with Beck in the second Jeff Beck Group line-up alongside vocalist/guitarist Bobby Tench, bassist Clive Chaman and drummer Cozy Powell. He briefly stayed with Beck in a third line-up that ultimately metamorphosed into the Beck, Bogert & Appice power trio before joining Tench in Hummingbird during 1976. Hummingbird released two successful albums with Middleton as keyboard player, We Can't Go on Meeting Like This (1976) and Diamond Nights (1977), both produced by Ian "Sammy" Samwell. During this period, he continued to work with Beck, appearing on Blow By Blow (1975) and Wired (1976). By this time Middleton had become a sought-after session musician, playing on albums such as the soundtrack to the film Sgt. Pepper's Lonely Hearts Club Band (1978) and Nazareth's most successful album, Hair of the Dog (1975). In 1977 he played keyboards on the Rhead Brothers first EMI album 'Dedicate', later writing and arranging a score for the track, 'When the Seagull flies' on their second album Black Shaheen.

In 1979, he played keyboards on Morrissey–Mullen's Cape Wrath and released Another Sleeper in the same year, an instrumental album with guitarist Robert Ahwai. This classic jazz-funk album was released along with Cape Wrath, on Fusion Harvest/EMI Records, the duo is supported by Richard Bailey, Kuma Harada, Darryl Lee Que, Steve Gregory, Bud Beadle, George Chisholm, Trevor Barber, Chris Rainbow and some backing vocalists.

In 1980 Middleton was involved with the arrangements on and played keyboards for Kate Bush's Never For Ever, which had album and single success. The following year he played on John Martyn's first album for WEA, Glorious Fool. Throughout the 1980s he was also involved with Chris Rea playing on Shamrock Diaries, On the Beach, New Light Through Old Windows, The Road to Hell, Auberge, God's Great Banana Skin, Espresso Logic, La Passione, The Blue Cafe, The Road to Hell: Part 2 and King of the Beach. He produced Dick Morrissey's Souliloquy (1988) on which he played keyboards. He also toured regularly with Mick Taylor's band during the mid to late 1990s. Middleton is credited as co-writer with Gary Moore of "The Loner" from Cozy Powell's album Over the Top (1979) and as co-writer of "The Loner" from Gary Moore's album Wild Frontier (1987). Middleton released the smooth jazz album Land of Secrets in 2003 and became a member of Snowy White & The White Flames in 2005. In 2009, 2010 and 2013 he played with Mick Taylor's band.

In November 2010 Middleton released the album One Thousand Sails and in April 2013 he released the album Two Cranes.

== Bibliography ==
- Bilyeu, Melinda; Cook, Hector; Hughes, Andrew Môn; Brennan, Joseph and Croban, Mark. The Bee Gees: tales of the brothers Gibb. Omnibus Press (2004). ISBN 9781844490578
- Moy, Ron. Kate Bush and Hounds of Love. Ashgate Publishing Ltd (2007). ISBN 978-0-7546-5798-9
