= Beck's Bolero =

1966 instrumental by Jeff Beck

- First UK single pressing with "Bolero" as title and "Jeff Beck" as composer

Single by Jeff Beck

from the album Truth
- A-side: "Hi Ho Silver Lining"
- Released: 10 March 1967
- Recorded: 16–17 May 1966
- Studio: IBC, London
- Genre: Instrumental rock; hard rock
- Length: 2:53
- Label: Columbia; Epic
- Songwriters: Jimmy Page (credited, see text)
- Producers: Mickie Most (credited, see text)

Licensed audio
- "Beck's Bolero" on YouTube

"Beck's Bolero" is a rock instrumental recorded by English guitarist Jeff Beck in 1966. It is Beck's first solo recording and has been described as "one of the great rock instrumentals, epic in scope, harmonically and rhythmically ambitious yet infused with primal energy". "Beck's Bolero" features a prominent melody with multiple guitar parts propelled by a rhythm inspired by Maurice Ravel's Boléro.

The recording session brought together a group of musicians, including Jimmy Page, Keith Moon, John Paul Jones, and Nicky Hopkins, who later agreed that the line up was a first attempt at what became Led Zeppelin. However, there is an ongoing disagreement over the composer as well as producer credits. Despite being credited solely to Page, Beck claims that he made significant contributions to the composition. Likewise, Page and Simon Napier-Bell each claim to have produced it, while Mickie Most received the credit.

"Beck's Bolero" was not released until ten months after recording and then only as the B-side to Beck's first single. When it finally received greater exposure on Beck's debut album Truth in the latter part of 1968, it was still considered quite advanced even though it was over two years old, and is considered a key early track in the development of hard rock and heavy metal. It was one of Beck's favourite works, and he continued to perform it throughout his career. Several renditions have also been recorded by other musicians.

== Background ==
The recording session for "Beck's Bolero" was conceived of as a side project for Jeff Beck while he was a member of the Yardbirds. "It was decided that it would be a good idea for me to record some of my own stuff ... partly to stop me moaning about the Yardbirds", Beck recalled. Also, the Yardbirds' management was encouraging individual band members to bring attention to the band through success in solo projects. Studio time was booked for May 1966 at the IBC Studios in London. To prepare for the session, Beck called on long-time friend and studio guitarist Jimmy Page, who had recommended Beck as Eric Clapton's replacement in the Yardbirds, to work up some ideas for songs to record.

Although there is a disagreement over credits for the composition, both Beck and Page agree that Page began by playing some chords on a twelve-string guitar using a rhythm based on Boléro. Boléro is a one-movement orchestral piece composed by Maurice Ravel in 1928 and is "built on a persistent, repeating motif supported by a snare drum ... re-creating the Spanish 'bolero' dance pattern for full orchestra", according to Beck biographer Martin Power. A melody line for guitar was developed along with a middle section to break up the rhythm, reminiscent of the Yardbirds' arrangements for "For Your Love" and "Shapes of Things".

With at least the outline of one song and Page on board to play guitar, Beck approached Keith Moon of the Who, whom he considered one of his favourite drummers. Moon was unhappy with the Who at the time and readily agreed to participate. To avoid a confrontation with Pete Townshend and Kit Lambert, the Who's manager, Moon wished to do so incognito. He recommended bandmate John Entwistle, who was similarly discontented with the Who, to provide the bass.

== Recording ==
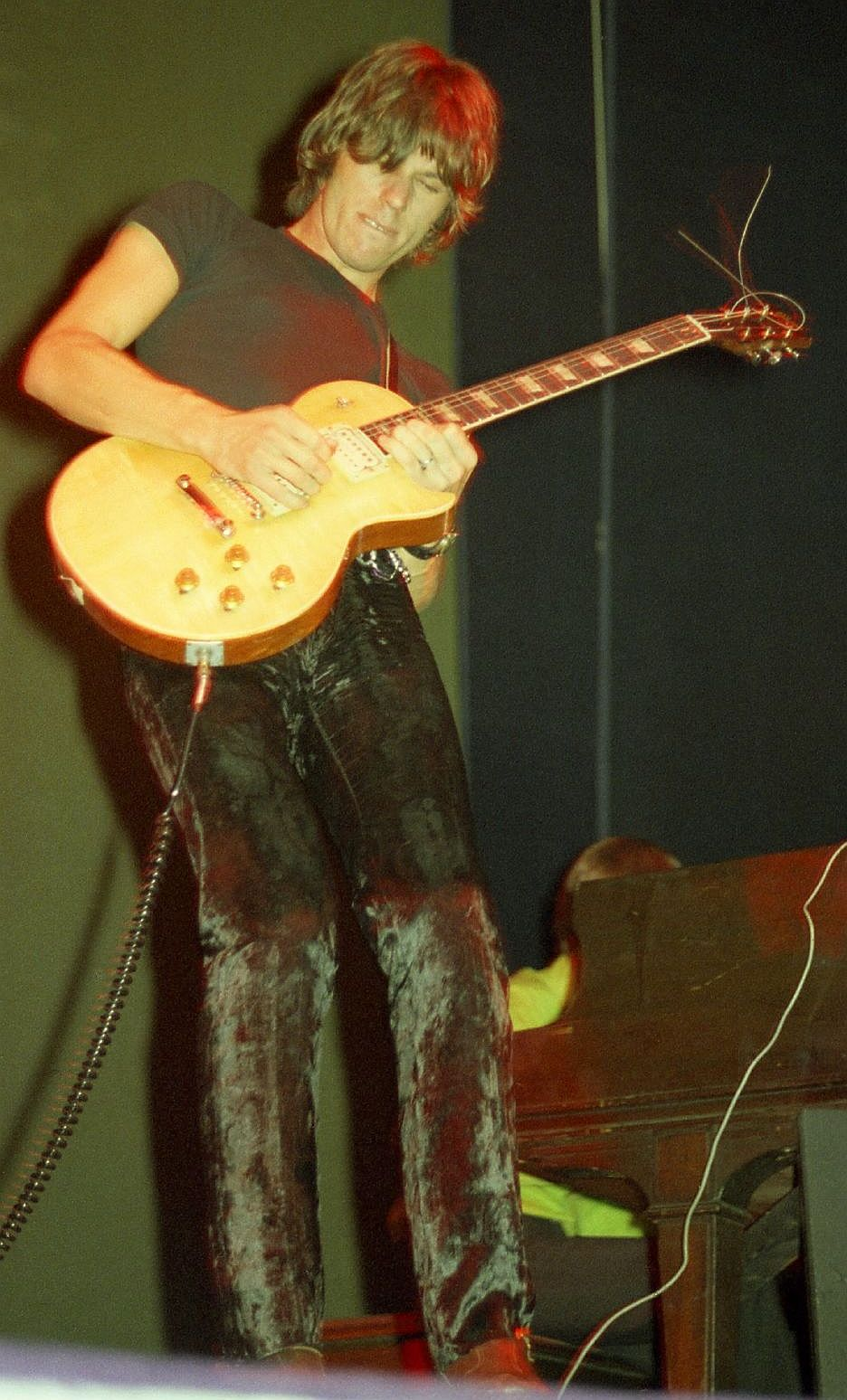
Jeff Beck at the Fillmore East, 1968 (Nicky Hopkins obscured behind piano)

Recording took place at IBC Studios in London on 16 and 17 May 1966. (Note: Although a date after Beck left the Yardbirds in November 1966 has also been suggested, Page was touring with them in the US for that entire month and would not have been able to attend.) Moon arrived at the studio disguised in sunglasses and a Russian cossack hat. "Moonie turned up," Beck recalled, "and I never expected it, because he was so scatty, and you never knew if he was going to show. But once he was in there, we started it off and I went and heard the playback and went, 'Jeez, this is the beginning of something amazing. You guys are not going anywhere.' Page on rhythm guitar, me on lead, John Paul Jones on bass – it's done! …And to cap it all we had Glyn Johns engineering. This is the motherlode! And the next day it was all over."

When Entwistle did not show, studio musicians John Paul Jones and Nicky Hopkins were brought in at the last minute to provide bass and piano. An unsubstantiated account holds that Ritchie Blackmore may have been involved, but his participation has not been acknowledged by Beck, Page or others at the session. Simon Napier-Bell, the Yardbirds' producer who had originally promoted the idea, was present for the recording.

Beck used a Gibson Les Paul played through a Vox AC30 amplifier and Page played a Fender Electric XII twelve-string electric guitar. Halfway through the song, Moon smashed the drum microphone with his stick; "You can actually hear him screaming as he does it," Beck remembered, "so all you can hear from then on is cymbals!" After Moon and Napier-Bell left, Beck and Page added overdubs and sound treatments to complete the track. According to Beck, two or three songs were recorded at the session, but "Beck's Bolero" was the only one released.

== Composition ==
"Beck's Bolero" is roughly divided into three parts. The first begins with a reworking of Ravel's two-chord progression, transposed to the key of A. Power points out that by using a 12-string guitar, Page is able to take advantage of the instrument's "rich chiming quality to emulate the distinct, orchestral 'bolero' sound". Beck then introduces the melody line on electric guitar with a fuzz-tone effect producing indefinite sustain; alternating between major and minor modes, it is described as "haunting" by Power and as a "distinctive piercing, sinister tone" by critic Richie Unterberger. In the second section, the piano, bass, and drums come in and the tension builds. Unterberger describes the third section as "suddenly set[ting] off from the main motif into a beautiful serene section highlighting slide-glissando guitars", with Beck's echo-laden slide sounding similar to a steel guitar. The fourth section returns to the main melody with overlaid drawn-out descending slide. According to Beck, "the phasing was Jimmy's idea ... I played a load of waffle and he reversed it". The tension mounts as Moon adds drum flourishes, climaxing with a break.

The second part begins with Moon's simultaneous drum break and scream and launches in a hard rock direction. "It was my idea to cut off in the middle, Yardbirds-style", Beck commented, "Keith upped the tempo and gave it an extra kick. It's like a bit of the Who, a bit of the Yardbirds and a bit of me". The amply-distorted guitar provides "a thick-toned, descending riff", according to Power. He also describes the break, inspired by the Yardbirds' rave-up technique, as "eerily presag[ing] the coming era of hard rock and heavy metal". The third part returns to the main motif with added guitar fills. The melody line is abandoned in the second section and replaced with multiple interwoven takes of guitar effects, including phasing, echo, and controlled feedback. It concludes with a few bars of hard blues rock-style lead guitar and an abrupt ending.

== Releases ==
Later Columbia single pressing with "J. Page" composer credit

The record release of "Beck's Bolero" was delayed for ten months, when Jeff Beck began his solo career after leaving the Yardbirds. It appeared as the B-side of his first single, "Hi Ho Silver Lining", which was released on 10 March 1967 in the UK (Columbia DB 8151) and 3 April 1967 in the US (Epic 5–10157). The initial UK pressing of the single listed the title as "Bolero" with Jeff Beck as the composer, while later pressings showed "Beck's Bolero" and "J. Page". The single reached number fourteen in the UK Singles Chart, and number 123 in the US Billboard's Bubbling Under Hot 100 Singles chart. "Hi Ho Silver Lining" was ignored by American underground FM radio, but "Beck's Bolero" became a staple of the new radio format.

In 1968, the instrumental gained wider exposure when it was included on the Jeff Beck Group debut album, Truth. Released in the US in July, the album reached number 15 in the Billboard 200 album chart one month later. Truth was issued in October in the UK, but it did not appear in the album charts. On the British monaural releases, "Beck's Bolero" has a fifteen-second backwards guitar coda. This version is included as a bonus track on the 2006 remastered Truth CD and on the Sundazed Music reissue of the original mono vinyl album. The original album liner notes do not list the personnel for "Beck's Bolero" – Jones' and Hopkins' contributions are noted for other songs along with "Timpani by 'You Know Who'", the "Who" being Moon.

"Beck's Bolero" remained one of Beck's favourite pieces and he performed it numerous times, often as his opening number. A live version in 2008 appears on his Live at Ronnie Scott's album and video. On 4 April 2009, Page formally inducted Beck into the Rock and Roll Hall of Fame and together they performed "Beck's Bolero" at the induction ceremony, with Page playing the original 1965 Fender XII guitar he used for the 1966 recording session.

== Disagreement over credits ==
=== Production ===
Beck's later producer, Mickie Most, the Yardbirds' producer, Simon Napier-Bell, and Jimmy Page have each claimed to be the recording's producer. At the time of the release of "Beck's Bolero", Beck was under contract to Most. Although he was not involved in the recording, under the terms of the contract, Most received a "mandated production credit" and it is his name that appears on the single and album credits. Napier-Bell, who was at least present for the recording, has claimed that his involvement was substantial:

I produced it, but I was naive about 'Bolero'. When Mickie Most took Jeff, he asked if there were any productions knocking around and I said 'Yes, we've got 'Bolero'.' So it eventually came out as a Mickie Most production, which has always pissed me off because it was such a great record. My fault, no one else's.

However, according to Jimmy Page, "the track was done and then the producer, Simon Napier-Bell, just disappeared ... [he] just sort of left me and Jeff to do it. Jeff was playing and I was [at the recording console]." Page asserts that he in fact was the instrumental's actual producer. In an interview before its release and his involvement with Most, Beck commented, "I've got an example of my production together with Jimmy Page and it's an instrumental", but does not mention Napier-Bell.

=== Composition ===
The initial Columbia Records pressing of the single listed the title as "Bolero" and "Jeff Beck" as the composer. However, Jimmy Page filed for the composer credit for "Beck's Bolero" and it is his name that appears on the credits for all but the initial release. Nonetheless, Beck has claimed credit for his contributions to the composition. Both Beck and Page agree that Page came up with the Boléro-influenced chords and rhythm. However, Beck specifically claims that key features of the instrumental—the haunting melody line and the second part "hard-rock" break—are his. Beck adds that the break contains "the first heavy metal riff ever written and I wrote it". While not addressing the specifics, Page asserts "I wrote it, played on it, produced it ... and I don't give a damn what [Jeff] says. That's the truth", but adds "the slide bits are his". Beck later put it behind him: "No, I didn't get a songwriting credit, but you win some and lose some down the years". Over the years, he and Page have made several appearances together in concerts and for interviews.

== Legacy ==
Beck, Page, Hopkins, Jones, and Moon were pleased with the outcome of the recording session and there was talk of forming a working group and additional recordings. This led to the famous quip, "Yeah, it'll go down like a lead zeppelin", which Page later used, with a slight spelling change, for his new group. Page ascribed it to Moon, while Beck's and Led Zeppelin's later manager Peter Grant claimed Moon used the phrase "go down like a lead balloon", to which Entwistle added "more like a lead zeppelin". Group biographer Keith Shadwick notes that forming an actual group at the time "was never a realistic option", due to existing contractual obligations.

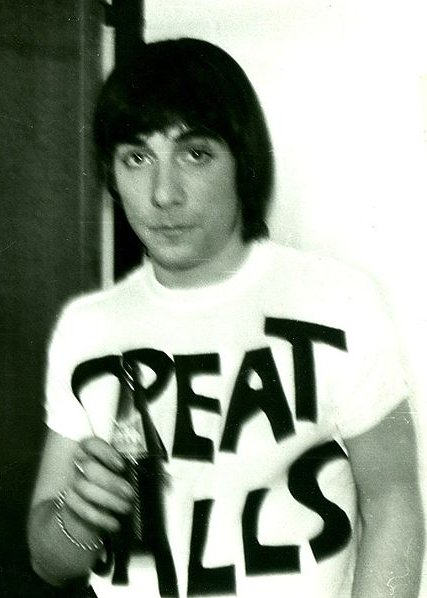
Keith Moon backstage in West Germany, 1967

For all their attempts at secrecy, Townshend learned of Moon's move. Beck recalled, "I remember [Pete] Townshend looking daggers at me when he heard it ... because it was a bit near the mark. He didn't want anybody meddling with that territory [his band, the Who] at all". Townshend also took to referring to Beck and Page as "flashy little guitarists of very little brain" for their perceived subterfuge (Page responded with "Townshend got into feedback because he couldn't play single notes"). In a later interview, Townshend explained

The thing is when Keith did Beck's 'Bolero', that wasn't just a session, that was a political move. It was at a point when the group was very close to breaking up. Keith was very paranoid and going through a heavy pills thing. He wanted to make the group plead for him because he'd joined Beck.

Differences with Moon were resolved and he returned to the Who shortly after the recording. One month later, Page joined the Yardbirds and together with Beck became one of the first dual-lead guitar teams in popular rock. In 1968, Hopkins became a member of the Jeff Beck Group and for performances of "Beck's Bolero" during their first US tour in June, singer Rod Stewart played the rhythm guitar part. Also in 1968, Page started Led Zeppelin with Jones. Page incorporated some of the melody line and bolero rhythm into the medley portion of "How Many More Times" for the Led Zeppelin debut album.

"Beck's Bolero" appears on various "best of" lists and in Guitar Masters: Intimate Portraits, Alan di Perna describes it as "one of the great rock instrumentals, epic in scope, harmonically and rhythmically ambitious yet infused with primal energy". The May 1966 recording pre-dated other mid-1960s hard rock/psychedelic rock milestones, such as the formation of Cream, Jimi Hendrix's arrival in England, the Beatles' Revolver album, and the rise of the San Francisco Sound. Guitarist Mike Bloomfield recalled that "Beck's Bolero" had a "significant impact on Jimi Hendrix, who named it among his favorite tracks". Beck recalled performing a live version with Hendrix on lead guitar, but a recording has not been forthcoming. (Note: According to Power's biography, Hendrix saw Beck perform with the Yardbirds in New York City (Beck left the group in October 1966), was "highly complimentary of Jeff's work" and lifted a guitar lick from "Happenings Ten Years Time Ago". However, in an interview with the Los Angeles Free Press, Hendrix said: "I wasn't really influenced by Beck. I only heard one record by him, 'The Shapes of Things', and I really dug it. I just listened to it and I liked it.")

According to Paul Hornsby, who played with Duane Allman in Hour Glass in 1967–1968 before the Allman Brothers Band, "Beck's Bolero" inspired Allman to take up slide guitar. After hearing Beck's record, Allman "loved that slide part and told me he was going to learn to play it", Hornsby recalled. In 1970, Joe Walsh adapted the slide-guitar section of "Beck's Bolero" for a James Gang song. Titled "The Bomber", the multi-part suite also includes a rendition of Ravel's Boléro and appears on the James Gang Rides Again album.

== Personnel ==
- Jeff Beck – lead guitar
- Jimmy Page – rhythm guitar
- John Paul Jones – bass
- Nicky Hopkins – piano
- Keith Moon – drums

== Sources ==
- Carson, Annette (2001). Jeff Beck: Crazy Fingers. Backbeat Books. ISBN 0-87930-632-7.
- Clayson, Alan (2002). The Yardbirds (1st. ed.). San Francisco: Backbeat Books. ISBN 0-87930-724-2.
- Classic Rock Instrumentals. Hal Leonard. 1992. ISBN 978-1-4584-9357-6.
- Clayson, Alan (2006). Led Zeppelin: The Origin of the Species: How, Why and Where It All Began (1st. ed.). Chrome Dreams. ISBN 1-84240-345-1.
- Creswell, Toby (2005). "Beck's Bolero". 1001 Songs: The Great Songs of All Time and the Artists, Stories and Secrets Behind Them (1st ed.). Hardie Grant Books. ISBN 978-1-74066-458-5.
- Eden (17 December 1966). "Jeff Beck: Alone in the Yardbirds". KRLA Beat. Vol. 2, no. 30.
- Eder, Bruce (2003). "Jeff Beck". In Bogdanov, Vladimir (ed.). All Music Guide to the Blues. Miller Freeman Books. ISBN 978-0-87930-736-3.
- Fletcher, Tony (2000). Moon: The Life and Death of a Rock Legend. It Books. ISBN 978-0-380-78827-9.
- Freeman, Scott (1995). Midnight Riders: The Story of the Allman Brothers Band. Little, Brown. ISBN 978-0-316-29452-2.
- Hjort, Christopher; Hinman, Doug (2000). Jeff's Book: From the Yardbirds to Jazz-Rock: A Chronology of Jeff Beck's Career, 1965–1980. Rock 'n' Roll Research Press. ISBN 978-0-9641005-3-4.
- Murray, Charles Shaar (August 2004). "Beck & Page's Guitar Summit". Mojo (129). Emap. ISSN 1351-0193.
- Neill, Andrew; Kent, Matthew (2009). Anyway, Anyhow, Anywhere: The Complete Chronicle of the WHO 1958–1978. Sterling Publishing. ISBN 978-1-4027-6691-6.
- Neill, Andy (2011). The Faces: Had Me a Real Good Time. Omnibus Press. ISBN 978-0-85712-694-8.
- Noble, Douglas J. (June 1993). "Jeff Beck on 'Beck's Bolero'". Guitar. Vol. 3, no. 4.
- di Perna, Alan (2012). Guitar Masters: Intimate Portraits. Hal Leonard. ISBN 978-1-4234-8988-7.
- Power, Martin (2011). Hot Wired Guitar: The Life of Jeff Beck. Omnibus Press. ISBN 978-1-84938-869-6.
- Roby, Steven (2012). Hendrix on Hendrix: Interviews and Encounters with Jimi Hendrix. Chicago: Chicago Review Press. ISBN 978-1-61374-322-5.
- Shadwick, Keith (2005). Led Zeppelin: The Story of a Band and Their Music 1968–1980 (1st. ed.). Backbeat Books. ISBN 978-0-87930-871-1.
- Tolinski, Brad (2012). Light and Shade: Conversations with Jimmy Page. Crown Publishing Group. ISBN 978-0-307-98573-6.
- Wall, Mick (2010). When Giants Walked the Earth: A Biography of Led Zeppelin. New York City: St. Martin's Griffin. ISBN 978-0-312-59039-0.
- Welch, Chris (2009). Peter Grant: The Man Who Led Zeppelin. Omnibus Press. ISBN 978-0-85712-100-4.
- Whitburn, Joel (2008). Joel Whitburn Presents Across the Charts: The 1960s. Record Research. ISBN 978-0-89820-175-8.
