= Fender Stratocaster XII =

12-string electric guitar introduced in 1988

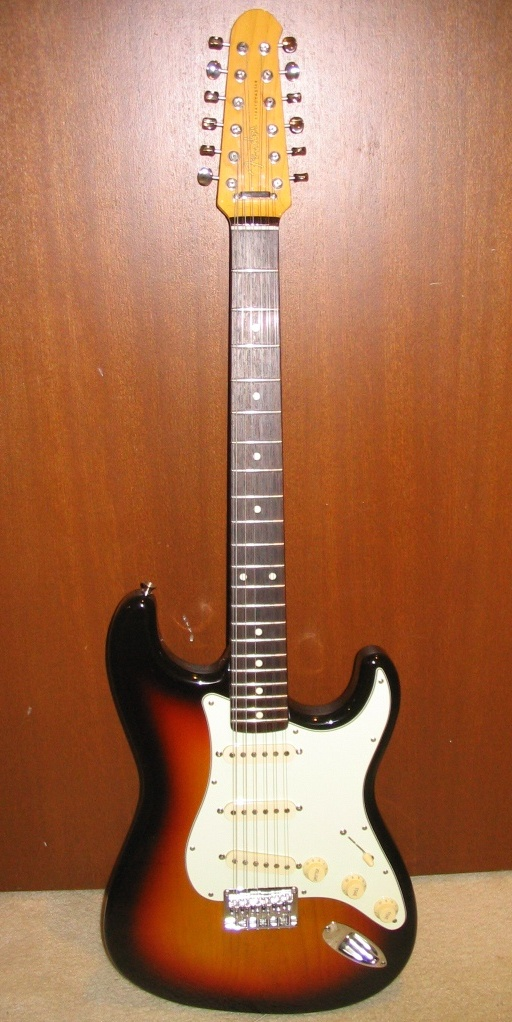
- Manufacturer: Fender
- Period: 1988–1996; 2005–2009; 2019–present

Construction
- Body type: Solid
- Neck joint: Bolt-on

Woods
- Body: Alder
- Neck: Maple
- Fretboard: (1985 version): Rosewood; (2005 and 2019 versions): Pau Ferro

Hardware
- Bridge: (2005 version): 12-String saddle Hard-tail Strat Bridge (adjustable); (1985 version): Electric XII/Mustang Bridge
- Pickup(s): 3 single coil Stratocaster pickups

Colors available
- (2005 version) Three-Tone Sunburst, Lake Placid Blue, Burgundy Mist Metallic

The Fender Stratocaster XII is the 12 string version of the Fender Stratocaster electric guitar made by Fender. It was introduced in 1988 and briefly re-issued 20 years later after a discontinuation in 1996. Unlike the Fender Electric XII, it uses a Strat-style body. Fender discontinued the Strat XII in 2009. It was reintroduced in 2019 with either a Sunburst or Olympic White finish

The Stratocaster XII is designed in the United States and manufactured in Japan. The original 1985 version featured some slight differences compared to the re-issue model of 2005; it had a larger bridge and saddle system similar to that of an Electric XII and an altered headstock shape with raised machine heads. It also used a 22-fret neck with a rosewood fingerboard and pearloid dots. The current version features a modified hard-tail Strat bridge, a pao ferro fretboard with 21 frets and clay dot inlays.

Stratocaster XII

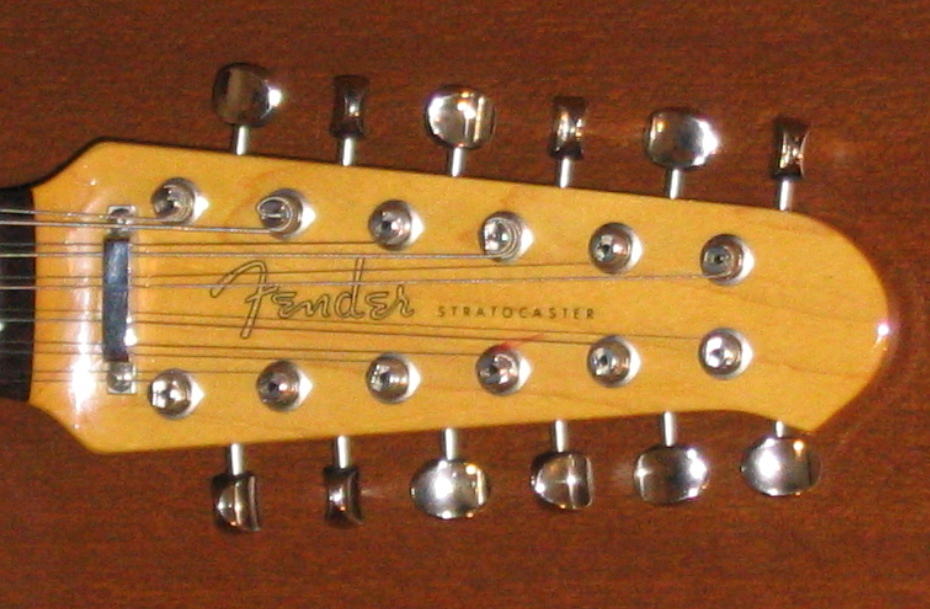
Detail of headstock

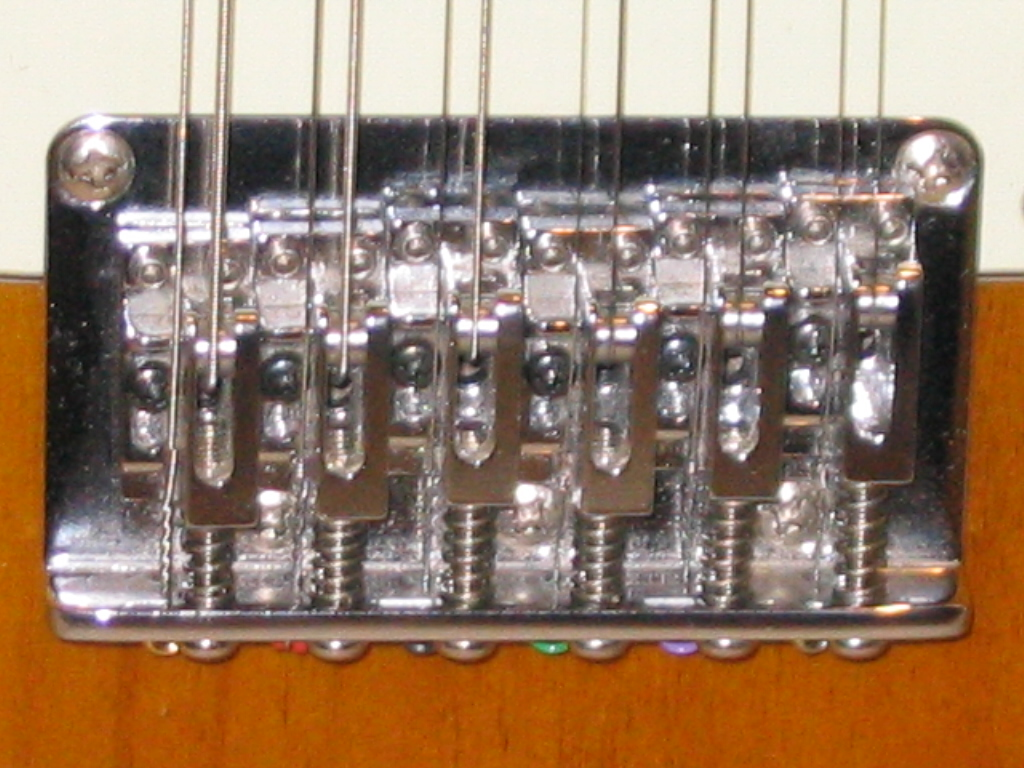
Detail of bridge

== Telecaster XII ==
The Telecaster XII is similar in design, features and construction to the original Stratocaster XII of 1985, except for the addition of a 2-piece premium lightweight ash Tele-style body, a 1-ply black pickguard and a 1-piece maple neck/fingerboard with black micarta dot inlays. This American-made Custom Shop limited-edition guitar was made in 1995 and discontinued in 1998.
