= Wavelength (album) =

1978 album by Van Morrison

Studio album by Van Morrison
- Released: September 1978; January 2008 (reissue) (remastered + 2 tracks)
- Recorded: Spring 1978
- Genre: Pop rock, R&B
- Length: 49:32
- Label: Warner Bros. (original release); Polydor (1988 reissue + all subsequent reissues)
- Producer: Van Morrison

Van Morrison chronology
A Period of Transition (1977)	Wavelength (1978)	Into the Music (1979)

Singles from Wavelength
- 1. "Wavelength" b/w "Checkin' it Out" Released: September 1978; 2. "Natalia" b/w "Lifetimes" Released: February 1979; 3. "Kingdom Hall" b/w "Checkin' it Out" Released: April 1979

Wavelength
Van Morrison, Wavelength (1978)

Kingdom Hall
Van Morrison, Wavelength (1978)

Natalia
Van Morrison, Wavelength (1978)

Wavelength is the tenth studio album by Northern Irish singer-songwriter Van Morrison, and was released in the autumn of 1978. The album has a different musical sound from his previous albums, leaning towards a pop rock sound with prominent electric guitars and synthesizers. Wavelength was Morrison's best selling album at the time of the original release. Mick Glossop, Bobby Tench and Peter Bardens were given credit for special assistance in production.

A remastered version of the album was released on 29 January 2008. It contains two bonus tracks, "Wavelength" and "Kingdom Hall", taken from the promotional album Van Morrison Live at the Roxy (1979), recorded on 26 November 1978.

== Recording ==
Wavelength was recorded over several months at the Manor in Oxfordshire, England, and completed later at Shangri-la studios in the United States. Morrison had brought together musicians that represented almost all phases of his musical history to date: Herbie Armstrong from his showband days in Belfast, Peter Bardens from Them, Garth Hudson from the Band and Peter Van Hooke who had worked with Morrison a few years earlier. He also added guitarist Bobby Tench who had been working with Streetwalkers at that time.

== Composition ==
The songs on this album recall various stages of Morrison's life. "Kingdom Hall" harked back to his childhood in Belfast when he attended services with his mother, who at one time was a practising Jehovah's Witness. "Checking It Out" is about a relationship going wrong and being rescued by "guides and spirits along the way". "Natalia", "Venice USA" and "Lifetimes" are love songs. "Wavelength" recalled fond memories of his adolescence listening to the Voice of America. The next track incorporates two songs Morrison had written in the early 1970s: "Santa Fe" written with Jackie DeShannon in 1973, Morrison's first ever collaboration to appear on an album, and "Beautiful Obsession", which was first played during one of his concerts in 1971. No studio version of the song is known to have been recorded during that period. "Hungry For Your Love" appeared in the hit movie An Officer and a Gentleman (1982); on it, Morrison plays electric piano accompanied by Herbie Armstrong's acoustic guitar. It has become, along with "Wavelength", one of the more enduringly popular songs on the album. Morrison included "Hungry For Your Love" on his compilation album Van Morrison at the Movies – Soundtrack Hits (2007).

"Take it Where You Find It" ends the album and, according to Scott Floman, is a "quietly epic love letter to America that gets better and better as it goes along (the song is nearly 9 minutes long). Simply put this song, which I'd rank among Van's all-time best, makes me want to lock arms with someone, anyone, and commence in a slowly swaying sing along..."

== Critical reception ==
Professional ratings
Review scores
Source	Rating
AllMusic	4/5 stars
The Rolling Stone Album Guide	2.5/5 stars
Uncut	2/5 stars
The Village Voice	B+
DownBeat	4/5 stars

In a contemporary review for Rolling Stone, Lester Bangs gave a lukewarm assessment and called Wavelength "a very nice record. I'm sure all the people at Warner Bros. are pleased with it. Ditto the DJs... Still, though, it do confound how such a monumental talent can mire himself in such twaddle, fine as some of it may be." Melody Maker reviewed the album as evidence of Morrison's "drift into the American Dream." In The Village Voice, Robert Christgau referred to it as a good but not great album and called attention to side two, which he felt was "an evocative reinterpretation of Van's America fixation, but side one is nothing more (and nothing less) than class programming." Time magazine was more enthusiastic: "Morrison has made two, maybe three albums that rank high among the finest of all rock 'n' roll. Wavelength is good enough to stand close by Morrison's best work, a record of sinuous, sensuous magic. The man just can't be beat."

In a retrospective review for AllMusic, Stephen Thomas Erlewine said "Wavelength essentially picks up where A Period of Transition left off, offering a focused, full-bodied alternative to that record's warmly fuzzy lack of direction." Rob Sheffield wrote in The Rolling Stone Album Guide (2004) that the record was a "failed pop move" redeemed by its "worthy hit" title track, "which like many of his best songs expresses the profound spiritual yearning to listen to the radio".

Record World said of the single "Natalia" that it "has a smooth beat, punctuated by...jazz/ pop vocal power."

In his review for DownBeat, Bob Henschen wrote, "Morrison is getting back to the honest mixture of basic rock and R&B that has made him, for a decade and a half since the emergence of them, one of the United Kingdom’s most convincing blues and soul singers". Henschen assigned 4 stars to the album.

== Aftermath ==
Morrison denied that the songs were anything but about personal experience, and were not about the United States. It quickly became the fastest-selling album that Morrison had recorded up to that time, and went gold within three months. He relocated to Europe within a few years; his work during the 1980s would not be so "radio friendly" and easily accessible to the casual listener. With the success of Wavelength, Morrison assembled a band to promote it, similar in many ways to the abandoned Caledonia Soul Orchestra of It's Too Late to Stop Now fame. During the Wavelength tour, Morrison performed in his native Belfast for the first time since leaving for the US to record "Brown Eyed Girl" for Bang Records. Morrison's first video, Van Morrison in Ireland, released in 1981, resulted from these performances, and featured two songs from the album: "Wavelength" and "Checkin' It Out".

== Artwork ==
The cover on the album was by photographer Norman Seeff (associated with Joni Mitchell's album sleeves), and shows Morrison almost smiling and dressed in tight white trousers smoking a cigarette down to the butt.

== Track listing ==
All songs written by Van Morrison except where noted.

Side one

1. "Kingdom Hall" – 5:59
2. "Checkin' It Out" – 3:29
3. "Natalia" – 4:04
4. "Venice U.S.A." – 6:32
5. "Lifetimes" – 4:15

Side two

1. "Wavelength" – 5:44
2. "Santa Fe/Beautiful Obsession" (Jackie DeShannon/Morrison) – 7:04
3. "Hungry for Your Love" – 3:45
4. "Take It Where You Find It" – 8:40

Remastered CD reissue (2008)

Includes the same tracks as on the original, with two additional bonus tracks recorded live at the Roxy Theatre, West Hollywood, on 26 November 1978:

1. "Kingdom Hall" – 6:05
2. "Wavelength" – 6:07

== Personnel ==
=== Musicians ===
- Van Morrison – vocals, acoustic guitar, piano, Fender Rhodes, alto saxophone, backing vocals
- Bobby Tench – electric guitar, backing vocals
- Herbie Armstrong – rhythm guitar, backing vocals
- Mitch Dalton – Spanish guitar ("Take It Where You Find It")
- Mickey Feat – bass guitar
- Kuma Harada – bass ("Santa Fe/Beautiful Obsession" and "Take It Where You Find It")
- Peter Bardens – keyboards, synthesizer
- Garth Hudson – Hammond organ, synthesizer, accordion
- Ginger Blake – backing vocals
- Laura Creamer – backing vocals
- Linda Dillard – backing vocals
- Peter Van Hooke – drums

=== Additional musicians on 2008 reissue (re-mastered) ===
- Katie Kissoon – backing vocals
- Anna Peacock – backing vocals

=== Production ===
- Producer – Van Morrison
- Special assistance with production – Mick Glossop, Bobby Tench and Peter Bardens
- Production Assistant – Paul Wexler
- Second engineers – Alan Douglas, Richard Ash
- Remixed – Brooke Arthur
- Engineer – Mick Glossop
- Additional remix engineer – Peter Granet
- Assisting engineer – David Latman, Alex Kash

=== Design ===
- Coordination – Danny Lipsius
- Art direction – John Cabalka
- Design – Brad Kanawyer
- Photography – Norman Seeff

== Charts ==
Chart (1978/79)	Peak position
Australia (Kent Music Report)	16
US Top LPs & Tape (Billboard)	28
UK Albums Chart	27
