= Hummingbird (band) =

British rock band

- Hummingbird (1975)

Background information
- Genre: Rock
- Years active: 1974-1977
- Label: A&M
- Past members: Bobby Tench; Max Middleton; Clive Chaman; Bernie Holland; Conrad Isidore; Robert Ahwai; Bernard Purdie

Hummingbird were a British rock band, formed in 1974 by Bobby Tench of The Jeff Beck Group. The band recorded three albums which were released by A&M Records in the United States, Canada, Australia, Japan and Europe and employed Ian Samwell as their producer. The original line-up included members of the second Jeff Beck Group, vocalist and guitarist Bobby Tench, keyboardist Max Middleton, bassist Clive Chaman, drummer Conrad Isidore and second guitarist Bernie Holland.

At the start of sessions for their first album they were joined by Jeff Beck for a brief period but he did not contribute to the album and left to work on his own project. After the first album Bernie Holland was replaced by guitarist Robert Ahwai and drummer Bernard "Pretty" Purdie replaced Isidore on the next two albums, vocalists Madeline Bell and Liza Strike were brought in to complement the band.

The Gramophone music magazine commented that "the members of Hummingbird are the cream of British session musicians, more acclimatised than most to playing rock at all intellectual levels".

== Personnel ==
- Bobby Tench - guitar, vocals (1974–1977)
- Max Middleton - keyboards (1974–1977)
- Clive Chaman - bass (1974–1977)
- Bernie Holland - guitar (1974)
- Conrad Isidore - drums (1974)
- Jeff Beck - guitar (during sessions in 1974)
- Robert Ahwai - guitar 1974–1977)
- Bernard Purdie - drums (1974–1977)
- Ian Samwell - producer

== Discography ==
Albums

- Hummingbird A&M AMLS 68292 (1975)
- We Can't Go On Meeting Like This A&M AMLH 68383 UK / SP-4595 USA (1976)
- Diamond Nights A&M AMLHI 64661 UK / SP 4661 USA (1977)

Singles

- "For the Children's Sake" /"You can keep your money" A&M AMS 7193 (1975) From Hummingbird album
- "Trouble maker"/"Gypsy Skies" A&M AMS 7254 (1976) From We Can't Go on Meeting Like This album
- "Madatcha"/"Anna's song" A&M AMS 7325(1977) from Diamond Nights Album
