= Clive Chaman =

Trinidad and Tobago musician (born 1949)

- Born: 5 September 1949 (age 76); Port of Spain, Trinidad and Tobago
- Origin: London, England
- Genres: Rock music, jazz, pop, blues rock, hard rock
- Occupation: Musician
- Instrument: Bass guitar
- Years active: 1965–present
- Formerly of: Romeo Z, Brian Auger's Oblivion Express, The Jeff Beck Group, Hummingbird

Clive Chaman (born 5 September 1949) is a UK-based bass guitarist and session musician, born in Port of Spain, Trinidad and Tobago.

== Background ==
Chaman appears on recordings by UK artists including Brian Auger's Oblivion Express, Donovan, Chris Rainbow, Murray Head, Morrissey–Mullen and Paul Kossoff. Chaman was also briefly a member of Ritchie Blackmore's Rainbow replacing Bob Daisley

== Career ==
=== 1960s ===
Romeo Z

Around the mid-1960s, he was a member of Romeo Z, a club group that was made up of Clive Chaman on Bass, his brother Stan Chaman the group leader, Eric Allendale on trombone, Eddie Cuansa on trumpet, Erwin Clement on drums, and Jerry Elboz / Elbows on conga and vocals. There was another line up of the group that had Gerry Day as drummer and lead singer. They were described as having their brand of Mongo Santamaria sound and their kind of Latin / R & B.

The group were spotted at the Chi-Chi club one night when Stanley Myers and Barry Fantoni had stopped in and were discussing the kind of switched on song they needed for a switched on intense movie. The ceiling started to shake when the resident band Romeo Z came on. They subsequently enlisted the band to record the song "Kaleidoscope" which was used in the film, Kaleidoscope. The soundtrack Kaleidoscope was released on Warner Bros. W 1663 in October 1966. A single-sided promo 45 of the track was released on KAL 1.

They recorded a single "Come Back, Baby Come Back" bw "Since My Baby Said Goodbye" which was produced by Irving Martin. It was released by March 25 on CBS 202645 in 1967. It was listed in the CB New Hit Singles selection in the April 1 issue of Melody Maker. It got a brief review in the Shop Window section of the April 8, 1967 issue of New Musical Express. The raw vibrant excitement, Latin and R&B influences, congas and brass were noted. Penny Valentine also reviewed the single in her Quick Spins section of the April 8 issue of Disc & Music Echo. She said they made good discotheque sounds on the record and that it had more clarity than most. It was in the "Rapid Singles" section of the April 8 issue of Record Mirror.

By 1967, the group had been playing together for three years which included resident spots at the Pigalle Restaurant, the Pickwick and the Chi Chi. That year, Allendale would become part of a group that evolved out of The Ramong Sound and into The Foundations who were charting with "Baby Now That I've Found You". Stan Chaman would be in the band U. F. O., recording on the Semp label, covering Bill Withers' "Ain't No Sunshine", and Sylvester Stewart's "Somebody's Watching You".

=== Line ups ===
Led by Gerry Day

- Eric Allandale (trombone)
- Clive Charman (bass)
- Stan Charman (guitar)
- Gerry Day (leader, drums, vocals).

Led by Stan Chaman

- Eric Allandale (trombone)
- Clive Chaman (Bass)
- Stan Chaman (group leader, guitar)
- Erwin Clement (drums)
- Eddie Cuansa (trumpet)
- Jerry Elboz / (Elbows) (congas, vocals)

=== 1970s ===
After appearing on Ram John Holder's 1969 London Blues album, Chaman became a member of the second Jeff Beck Group in 1971 until they disbanded in 1972 when he joined Cozy Powell's band Hammer. In 1973 he played on Now Hear This an album by Junior Marvin's band Hanson appearing alongside Bobby Tench from the second Jeff Beck Group and during this period became a member of Brian Auger's Oblivion Express. In 1974 he joined Hummingbird with keyboard player Max Middleton, vocalist and guitarist Bobby Tench and US drummer Bernard Purdie, amongst others. Hummingbird went on to record three albums for A&M Records. Following Linda Lewis' release of the Tony Sylvester and Bert de Coteaux produced "The Old Schoolyard" single, Chaman along with Max Middleton and Richard Bailey etc. were the musicians likely to back Lewis on her upcoming US club tour.

In 1979, Chaman rehearsed with the band Rainbow when they were working on their album Down to Earth but was soon replaced by former Deep Purple bassist Roger Glover and did not play on the released album.

=== 1980s - ===
Chaman was the bass player on the Badness album which Morrissey–Mullen released in 1981. He played on the Raven Eyes album of Japanese heavy metal guitarist, Raven Ohtani which was released in 1984.

== Discography ==
- London Blues – Ram John Holder (1969)
- Jesus Christ Superstar - A Rock Opera - Tim Rice & Andrew Lloyd Webber (1971)
- Rough and Ready – The Jeff Beck Group (1971)
- Jeff Beck Group – The Jeff Beck Group (1972)
- Cosmic Wheels – Donovan (1973)
- Now Hear This – Hanson (1973)
- Hummingbird – Hummingbird (1975)
- Reinforcements - Brian Auger's Oblivion Express (1975)
- We Can't Go On Meeting Like This – Hummingbird (1976)
- Score – Duncan Mackay (1977)
- Happiness Heartaches - Brian Auger's Oblivion Express (1977)
- Diamond Nights – Hummingbird (1977)
- Badness – Morrissey–Mullen (1981)
