= Bobby Tench =

English musician and songwriter (1944–2024)

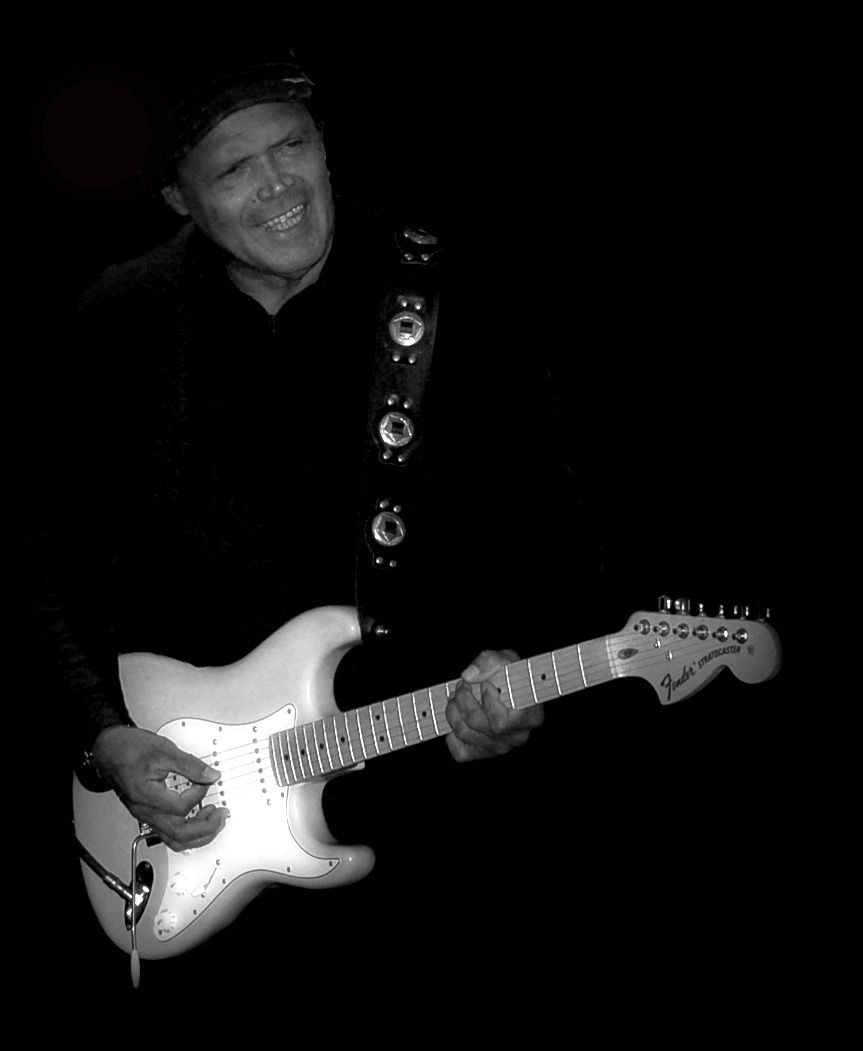
- Tench performing in 2009

Background information
- Also known as: Bob Tench, Bobby Gass
- Born: Robert Tench; 21 September 1944; Trinidad, Trinidad and Tobago
- Died: 19 February 2024 (aged 79) London, England
- Genres: Rock; blues rock; electric blues; funk
- Occupations: Musician
- Instruments: Guitar; bass; vocals; keyboards
- Years active: 1960s–2024
- Labels: A&M; Atco; Epic; Jet; Mercury; Parlophone; Polydor; RCA; RSO; Sanctuary; Stiff; Vertigo
- Formerly of: Alan Price & The Electric Blues Company; The Gass; Catch My Soul; Gonzalez; Ginger Baker; Freddie King; Junior Marvin's Hanson; Humble Pie; Van Morrison; The Jeff Beck Group; Streetwalkers; Hummingbird; Topper Headon

Robert Tench (21 September 1944 – 19 February 2024) was a British singer, guitarist, sideman, songwriter and arranger.

Tench was best known for his work with Freddie King and Van Morrison, as well as being a member of the Jeff Beck Group, Humble Pie and Streetwalkers. At the start of his career he performed and recorded with the Gass and also appeared with Gonzalez, before joining the Jeff Beck Group. He recorded with Ginger Baker before touring with Beck, Bogert & Appice as vocalist and recording sessions with Linda Lewis. Associations with Wailer Junior Marvin and blues guitarist Freddie King followed.

He signed to A&M Records and formed Hummingbird, later joining Roger Chapman and Charlie Whitney in Streetwalkers. During this period he had brief associations with Boxer and Widowmaker, recording album tracks with each before working with Van Morrison. When his commitments with Morrison came to an end he moved on to work and record with Eric Burdon also Axis Point, before Steve Marriott included him as an official band member in a new lineup of Humble Pie. Tench continued to record and make live appearances, until his death in February 2024 at the age of 79.

== Early years ==
He was born in Trinidad and his family moved to London when he was young. Inspired by Ray Charles and Sam Cooke he began singing in bands as a teenager and learnt to play guitar. Bands he played with during his teenage years included The Senators and The Creators.

== Career ==
=== The Gass ===
Tench formed the Gass with Godfrey and Errol McLean in May 1965 and they soon recruited the remaining three members, Humphrey Okah, Ian Thomas and Stuart Colwell. The band played mainly in the London Club circuit appearing at West End venues such as Rasputin's, The Bag O'Nails, The Speakeasy Club, The Flamingo Club (also known as The Pink Flamingo), Sibyllas and Revolution. They also made other appearances elsewhere in the UK with occasional tours in Europe.

The Gass were often accompanied on stage by guest musicians such as Georgie Fame, Jimi Hendrix and Eric Burdon. They recorded two singles for Parlophone and another for CBS with their original lineup, before taking a more progressive musical direction. During 1968 they were supporting bands such as Led Zeppelin at the University of Surrey, who were making an early UK appearance billed as The Yardbirds. Tench moved on with drummer Godfrey McLean to form a new lineup and were signed by Polydor Records soon before their debut release. By that time, the band was simply known as Gass and were the backing band for Catch My Soul (1968), a stage musical produced by Jack Good. Tench was later featured as a part of Gass on the original UK cast but soundtrack "Catch My Soul" released in 1971. They recorded Juju (1970) featuring the Fleetwood Mac guitarist Peter Green on the tracks "Juju" and "Black Velvet".

Tench instigated an early lineup of Gonzalez in 1970. with Godfrey McLean. This included Gass bandmates bassist Delisle Harper, percussionist Lennox Langton and sax player Mick Eve.

=== The Jeff Beck Group ===
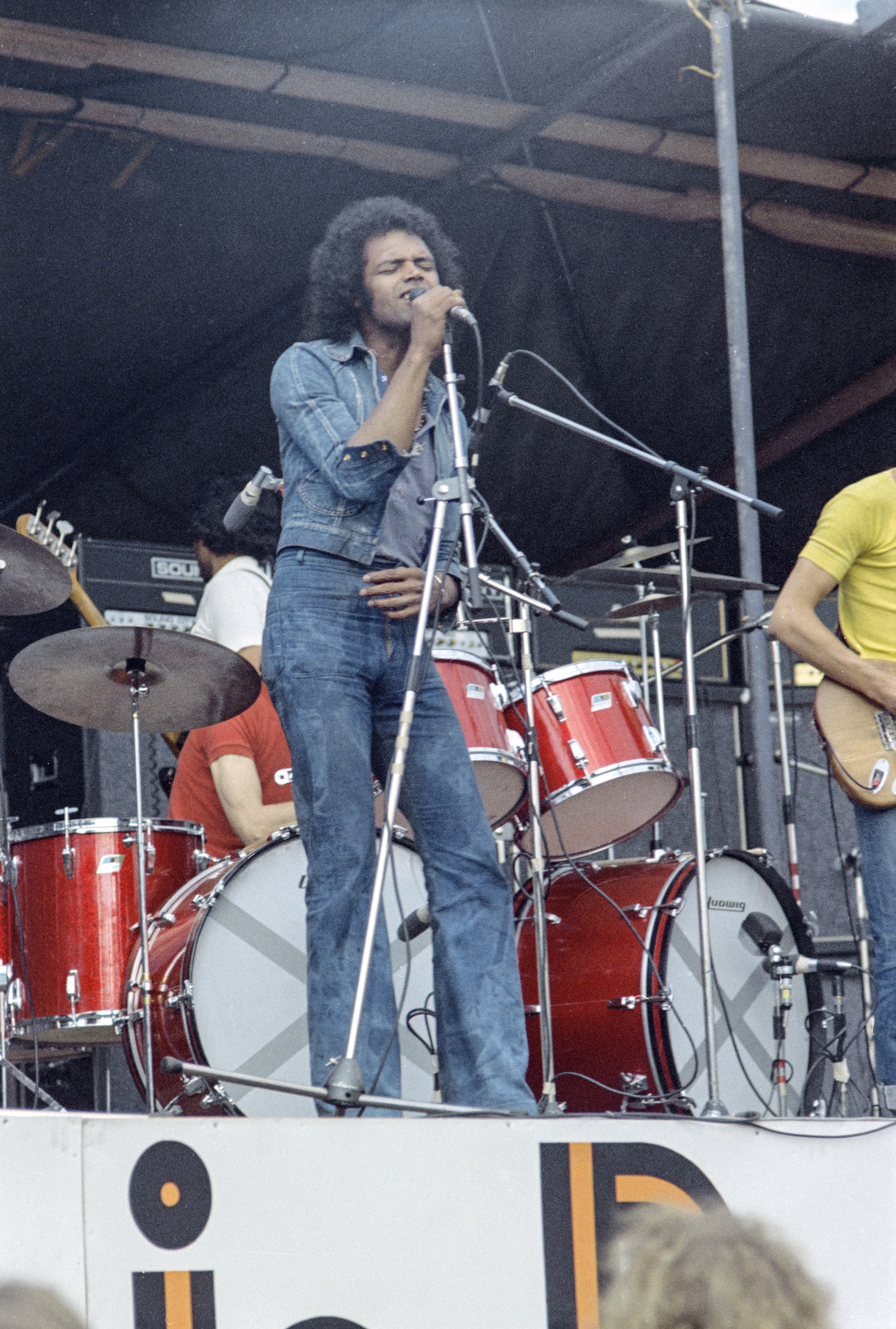
Tench performing with the Jeff Beck Group in 1971

Tench moved on at the end of May 1971, leaving Gass and Gonzalez to become a member of the Jeff Beck Group. Jeff Beck had signed a record deal with CBS in June 1971, having reformed the Jeff Beck Group. Vocals by Alex Ligertwood had been unexpectedly rejected by record company bosses, forcing Beck to find a replacement singer. Having heard Tench perform with Gass "Upstairs" at Ronnie Scott's club in Soho, London Beck employed him as the replacement vocalist. In their book about Beck, Chris Hjort and Doug Hinman mention these circumstances. He was given only a short time to add his vocals to Rough and Ready (1971), before mixing resumed on tracks previously recorded in London by Beck and the other band members including, drummer Cozy Powell, bassist Clive Chaman and keyboard player Max Middleton.

When the album was released in Europe they toured Finland, the Netherlands, Switzerland and Germany. Rough and Ready was released in USA eight months later and a sixteen date promotional tour followed. The album eventually reached No. 46 on the US album charts. Of Tench Rolling Stone magazine stated: "...then comes Situation a long, well-played evocation of that misnamed hybrid jazz-rock and a neat rocker called Short Business. Vocalist Tench does a valiant job on both considering the considerable handicap of being mixed down under the guitar." In January 1972, the Jeff Beck Group travelled to United States to join Beck at TMI studios in Memphis, Tennessee, where they recorded the album Jeff Beck Group (1972) with Steve Cropper as producer. The promotional tour which followed included an appearance on the BBC In Concert series, which was recorded on 29 June 1972 at the Paris Theatre, London. During this session Tench's guitar playing was featured on "Definitely Maybe".

On 24 July 1972, the second Jeff Beck Group was officially disbanded and Beck's management released this statement: "The fusion of the musical styles of the various members has been successful within the terms of individual musicians, but they didn't feel it had led to the creation of a new musical style with the strength they had originally sought".

=== Ginger Baker, BBA and Freddie King ===
In 1971 Tench played guitar with Cream's drummer Ginger Baker, studio sessions were recorded and released on the album Stratavarious in July 1972. He was credited as Bobby Gass and appeared with Afro beat musician Fela Ransome-Kuti. He also appeared at live dates with Baker during this period. He reunited with Jeff Beck during the summer of 1972. At that time Beck was collaborating with bassist Tim Bogert and drummer Carmine Appice and they had begun touring the United States on 1 August 1972, billed as The Jeff Beck Group. Tench was flown in from England to replace vocalist Kim Milford, who left after the Arie Crown concert in Chicago, on 8 August. The tour concluded at the Paramount Theatre in Seattle, on 19 August 1972 and Tench ended his association with Jeff Beck further to the formation of the power trio Beck, Bogert & Appice.

Tench recorded with the blues rock guitarist Freddie King, credited on two King albums, Burglar (1974) and Larger Than Life (1975).

=== Linda Lewis and Junior Marvin's Hanson ===
Tench featured as guitarist on Fathoms Deep (1973), an album by Linda Lewis which followed her top twenty success with "Rock a Doodle Do" in the UK singles charts. He appeared alongside former Jeff Beck Group keyboardist Max Middleton, bassist Phil Chen and guitarist Jim Cregan who also produced the album. In her review of Fathoms Deep for Allmusic, Amy Hanson wrote: "Helmed by a virtual supergroup featuring the likes of R&B masters Bobby Tench, Max Middleton, Danny Thompson and rocker Philip Chen, alongside Jim Cregan, Fathoms Deep is a true singer songwriter's album, tasteful and tight".

During February 1973 he went into the studio with Junior Marvin who had formed the band Hanson also later known as Junior Marvin's Hanson. They recorded tracks for the album Now Hear This (1973). Marvin had previously appeared with Tench on the Gass album Juju three years previously, credited as Junior Kerr. The lineup on this album included drummer Conrad Isidore, bassist Clive Chaman who later joined Tench in Hummingbird and DeLisle Harper who also played bass and had been a member of Gass with Tench. The album fused rock with funk and was produced by Mario Medious also known as Big M.

=== A&M records, Hummingbird and Streetwalkers ===
Tench signed to A&M in 1973, and formed the rock and soul fusion band Hummingbird, whose lineup included members of the second Jeff Beck Group also a second guitarist Bernie Holland and drummer Conrad Isidore. They recorded Hummingbird in 1975, the first of three albums produced by Sammy Samwell. Jeff Beck recorded several tracks with the band which remained unreleased and made a live appearance with them at the Marquee Club in London.

In April 1975 he became a member of the Streetwalkers. He had already been performing as part of a fluid lineup with Roger Chapman and Charlie Whitney's band "Chapman Whitney Streetwalkers". Tench appeared with this touring band at concerts such as at Hyde Park in London in june 1974. He also appeared in television appearances with Streetwalkers, including Rockpalast in March 1975. Streetwalkers recorded their first album Downtown Flyer early in 1975, which was released during October the same year in Europe and the USA, following it up with a second album, the groove heavy Red Card (1976), which became their most respected album. On 8 June 1976 and in March 1977 he appeared with Streetwalkers on the BBC Radio 1 Peel Sessions

Tench recorded the second album with Hummingbird, We Can't Go On Meeting Like This, released in 1976 as the first of two albums to feature drummer Bernard "Pretty" Purdie. Tench also recorded at this time with Mott the Hoople and Spooky Tooth guitarist Luther Grosvenor's band Widowmaker which had been formed during 1975. He contributed guitar and vocals to their album Widowmaker (1976).

During 1976 Tench recorded with the UK band Boxer, formed in 1975 by Mike Patto and Ollie Halsall. These tracks were recorded at The Manor Studios in Oxfordshire and released on the album Bloodletting (1979). He appeared with members of Boxer at the Crystal Palace Garden Party concert promoted by Harvey Goldsmith on July 1 1976, billed as Dick and the Fireman. This concert also featured Eric Clapton, Freddie King, Larry Coryell and Ronnie Wood on the same bill. On 19 April 1977, Streetwalkers on their third appearance on Rockpalast. During 1977 they released their third and last studio album Vicious but fair and also Live Streetwalkers as the band broke up. Tench and Hummingbird's final album Diamond Nights was released the same year.

=== Van Morrison and Wavelength ===
Van Morrison included Tench in a new band lineup as the lead guitarist and a vocalist in March 1978, to record the Wavelength album. Tench was recommended to Morrison by drummer Peter Van Hooke, after Hooke had seen him perform with Streetwalkers. In an interview with Johnny Rogan Tench stated: "I quite liked the songs 'Natalia' and 'Wavelength' because I had a lot to do with them. They came together quickly. He's a very quick worker and once it's there he doesn't see why you can't record it. He let us get on with it, really. It was a good band." He was credited with production assistance, guitar and backing vocals on this album. This became Morrison's best selling album at that time. He also contributed lead guitar and vocals to the promotional tour which followed. This tour started in Santa Clara, California on 30 September 1978 and ended on 1 March 1979 in Newcastle upon Tyne, England.

By the end of the tour he had appeared in Morrison's lineup sixty two times. One of these appearances with Morrison was recorded and broadcast by WNEW-FM radio on 1 November 1978 at the Bottom Line in New York. In his book Van Morrison: The Mystic Music, Howard. A. DeWitt described this concert as: "the best live Van Morrison concert broadcast over radio". Later that year on 26 November 1978, Morrison appeared with the same band at the Roxy in Los Angeles, USA. This performance was recorded and released as the promotional album Live at the Roxy (1979). Two tracks were released later as part of the remastered Wavelength album in 2008.

Tench's last appearance with Morrison's band was in the video Van Morrison in Ireland (1981). This was filmed in February 1979 during Morrison's Wavelength Tour. Of the band's performance on the video Tony Stewart commented in the music paper NME that: "The band display a range of textures reminiscent of The Caledonia Soul Orchestra, first with the dark resonance of Toni Marcus' violin then Pat Kyle's bright sharp tenor sax and finally Bobby Tench's prickly electric guitar". In a review of the same video in 2012 Eleanor Mannikka mentions "the quality of the music" in her review for The New York Times.

=== Eric Burdon and Humble Pie ===
During May 1978 Tench joined Eric Burdon to record the album Darkness Darkness, at Roundwood House in County Leix Ireland. The album was released nearly two years later. This album was recorded using Ronnie Lane's Mobile Studio and with a lineup also including guitarists Brian Robertson from Thin Lizzy and Henry McCullough formerly of Wings and Mick Weaver from Traffic. He performed with Burdon at concerts during this time later joining Streetwalkers guitarist Charlie Whitney's band Axis Point.

Tench became a member of Humble Pie in 1980 further to a previously aborted attempt to enlist him. The lineup included founder member guitarist and vocalist Steve Marriott, their original drummer Jerry Shirley and American bassist Anthony "Sooty" Jones. They recorded and submitted "Fool For a Pretty Face" to record companies which Marriott had written with Shirley earlier. The song secured a recording contract with Atlantic subsidiary Atco in USA and Don Arden's Jet Records in UK. Tench remained with them and they recorded On To Victory (1980). This reached number sixty in the Billboard 200 album charts. The single "Fool For a Pretty Face" reached number fifty two in the US singles charts. Tench toured with Humble Pie in USA as part of the Rock 'N' Roll Marathon, which included others such as Aerosmith. The band recorded Go for the Throat (1980) and toured this album after its release Earlier in the tour scheduled appearances by the band were delayed and later Marriott became ill. These circumstances caused the tour to be cancelled. Soon afterwards Humble Pie disbanded.

Tench recorded "Chain Gang" in 1982 as a tribute to Sam Cooke, which was released by the German label Line Records. "Looking for a Good Time" was featured on the B side, a song co-written by Tench and Peter Bardens.

=== Other associations ===
In the early 1980s Tench formed the touring band Heart and Soul. He appeared with Roger Chapman's Shortlist at Glastonbury in 1985, also appearing with them at various other European festivals during that period. Moreover, he recorded with Topper Headon the drummer from The Clash, credited on Headon's album Waking Up (1986). The lineup included Headon, Tench, vocalist Jimmy Helms, former Ian Dury and the Blockheads, Clash keyboard player Mick Gallagher and bassist Jerome Rimson.

In 1986 he recorded vocals for a cover of "Still in Love with You" (1986) for Stiff Records, as a tribute to Phil Lynott who had died on 4 January the same year. The song was released as a single by the Stiff label, later the same year and featured Brian Robertson who had played on the original Thin Lizzy recording. The B side "Heart Out Of Love" was co-written by Jeremy Bird and Tench.

In 1993 Tench sang lead vocals with the Thin Lizzy band, which featured original Thin Lizzy drummer Brian Downey, former guitarist Brian Robertson also Doish Nagle and bassist Dough Brookie. The band played a tour of Ireland. The next year he played guitar and sang vocals with former Animals keyboardist Alan Price and The Electric Blues Company recording Covers (1994) with them. Later that year they recorded "A Gigster's Life for Me" with the same lineup. This album was recorded between July and August 1995 at Olympic Studios, London and released the next year as part of Sanctuary's Blues Masters Series. In his review for Allmusic, Thom Jurek stated that "the Peter Barden's and Bobby Tench song 'Good Times, Bad Woman' with its slippery guitars and keyboards feels more like Peter Green's mid-period work and the killer read of Boz Scagg's Some Change is more driven and funky than the original. Then there's the reggae-blues of the title track, which swings out of a jazzy backbeat into a rootsier inner circle type groove."

During 1995 he contributed guitar and vocals to Rattlesnake Guitar (1995), a tribute to Peter Green, joining Paul Jones and Max Middleton on the song "Whatcha Gonna Do" and Zoot Money on "Albatross". The album was released in October of the same year. Tench contributed guitar and vocals to Ruby Turner's rhythm and blues album Call Me by My Name during 1998 which was released in the same year, appearing alongside Boz Burrell, Stan Webb and Zoot Money.

Humble Pie drummer Jerry Shirley reformed Humble Pie in UK during 2000 with a lineup including former member Tench, their original bassist Greg Ridley and a new rhythm guitarist Dave "Bucket" Colwell. They recorded Back on Track, which was released by Sanctuary Records on 19 February 2002. A brief tour of UK and Europe with Company of Snakes followed but was curtailed due to Greg Ridley becoming ill.

On 14 April 2001 Tench appeared as a former member of Humble Pie at the Steve Marriott Tribute Concert, playing guitar and contributing vocals. He sang the Humble Pie song "Fool for Pretty Face" which he had originally recorded with the band in 1980 as vocalist and guitarist, performing with the house band which included Zak Starkey, Rabbit Bundrick and Rick Wills. Performances from this concert were recorded and a DVD entitled The Steve Marriott Astoria Memorial Concert 2001 was eventually released on 5 October 2004.

Tench continued with studio work, occasionally making appearances at live shows such as with Roger Chapman, Arthur Louis and Jim Cregan. In 2009 he was a featured artist in the Maximum Rhythm and Blues Tour of thirty two UK theatres.

On 17 March 2015 he performed several songs at The Half Moon, Putney music venue in London at a benefit concert for the former Wings guitarist Henry McCullough. The billing included Paul Carrack and Nick Lowe. During the same concert Tench also performed with the backing band Henry's Heroes, an appropriate pseudonym for Hinkley's Heroes. In the following years he appeared with the Barnes Blues Band and Alan Price at the historic music venue Bull's Head in South West London and elsewhere in the United Kingdom.

== Reputation and death ==
Tench died on 19 February 2024. In his article written as an obituary for the May 2024 edition of the Classic Rock magazine Dave Ling stated, "Although Tench never quite attained the level of appreciation that he deserved, his immense talent was recognised by serious music fans, peers and fellow musicians."

For Allmusic Mark Deming states in his biography of him, that he was "a talented journeyman singer and guitarist who worked with some of the biggest and best-respected names in British rock” and in their book Chronology of Jeff Beck's Career 1965–1980. Chris Hjort and Doug Hinman when writing about Tench joining the Jeff Beck group mention that he was "a talented singer and a proficient guitar player"

Matt Parker of Guitar World stated in the obituary he wrote about Tench in February 2024 that he was "a phenomenal vocalist" and recalled that his progressive vocals on the Jeff Beck Group's Rough and Ready album split critical opinion at the time of release. He also commented that Tench was an "adept guitarist".

When writing about Tench joining the Jeff Beck Group the author Martin Power in his book about Jeff Beck, makes reference to him stating that "he was a first class singer". On the original release of the Jeff Beck Group's album Rough and Ready, Stephen Davis of Rolling Stone magazine wrote "Then comes [the track] Situation and a neat rocker called Short Business. Vocalist Tench does a valiant job on both, considering the considerable handicap of being mixed down under the guitar. Tench has a fine, gravel voice and sometimes sounds like Felix Cavaliere. Trying to fill [Rod] Stewart's high heels is no mean feat and it's to Tench's credit that he carries himself well".

A Beat publication which featured an article about the band Hummingbird's album We can't go on meeting like this, noted that Tench's voice had "surprising power and range used to the full" and of the band in which Tench also played lead guitar, the music magazine Gramophone commented that "the members of Hummingbird are the cream of British session musicians, more acclimatised than most to playing rock at all intellectual levels".

In her review of The Linda Lewis album Fathoms Deep, Amy Hanson described Tench and other musicians who played on the album as "R&B masters". In 2008 Doug Collett reviewed Van Morrison's re-mastered Wavelength album (2008) for the online magazine All About Jazz and enthused about Tench's guitar solo on the title track stating that he "imbued his fast fingered guitar solo with all the joy of singing".

Fran Leslie wrote an editorial feature about Tench for the September 2009 edition of the Blues in Britain magazine. In her introduction she wrote, "our cover artist Bobby Tench is a musician who has played and recorded with so many people that his biography reads like a Who's Who of British Blues". She also stated that he was a "noted singer and formidable guitarist".

The Canadian rock band Danko Jones mention Tench in "Sugar High" a song taken from their album Never too Loud (2009).

In a 2012 interview with Tom Jennings from Backstage Axxess, Joe Bonamassa mentioned Tench as a vocal influence. Later, in a 2018 interview with Planet Rock magazine Bonamassa mentioned Tench's vocal skills and stated that, he "had one of the best voices of the 1970s".

Carmine Appice stated in his 2016 autobiography entitled Stick It, that Tench was "a killer soulful singer with a real cool gritty edge to his vocals".

== Guitars ==
Tench sold his vintage 1959 Les Paul Standard to Mark Knopfler in 1999. Knopfler sold this guitar for £693,000 at a Christie's auction in London on January 31, 2024. He also played Fender Stratocasters, during his time with Streetwalkers and throughout his career using models finished in powder blue, sunburst and black. In the latter part of his career he occasionally played a modified V100 Icon Lemon Drop made by the Vintage guitar company.

== Discography ==
=== Solo singles ===
Date of issue	A-side	B-side	Label	Country	Single	Format
1982	"Chain Gang" (S.Cooke/C.Cooke)	"Looking for a Good Time" (Tench/Bardens)	Line	Germany	Tribute to Sam Cooke	7"
1986	"Still in Love with You" (Lynott/Moore)	"Heart out of Love" (Tench/Jeremy Bird)	Stiff	UK/Europe	Tribute to Phil Lynott	7"
1986	"Still in Love with You" (Lynott/Moore)	"Heart out of Love" (Tench/Jeremy Bird)	Stiff	UK/Europe	Extended version	12"

=== Singles with collaborators ===
Gass

Date of issue	A-side	B-side	Label	Country	Album	Format
1965	"One Of These Days"	"I Don't Know Why"	Parlophone	UK	N/A	7"
1966	"The New Breed"	"In The City"	Parlophone	UK	N/A	7"
1967	"Dream Baby (How Long Must I Dream)"	"Jitterbug Sid"	CBS	UK	N/A	7"
1971	"Something's Got to Change Your Ways"	"Mr. Banana"	Polydor	UK/Europe	N/A	7"

The Jeff Beck Group

Date of issue	A-side	B-side	Label	Country	Album	Format
1971	"Got the Feeling"	"Situation"	Epic	US/Europe	Rough and Ready	7"

Hanson (Junior Marvin)

Date of issue	A-side	B-side	Label	Country	Album	Format
1973	"Love Knows Everything"	"Take You into My Home"	Manticore	US/Europe	Now Hear this	7"

Freddie King

Date of issue	A-side	B-side	Label	Country	Album	Format
1974	"My Credit Didn't Go Through"	"Texas Flyer"	RSO	US	Burglar	7"

Streetwalkers

Date of issue	A-side	B-side	Label	Country	Album	Format
1975	"Raingame"	"Miller"	Vertigo	US/Europe	Downtown Flyers	7"
1976	"Daddy Rolling Stone"	"Hole in Your Pocket"	Vertigo	Europe	Red Card	7"
1977	"Chilli Con Carne"	"But You're Beautiful"	Vertigo	Europe	Vicious but Fair	7"

Hummingbird

Date of issue	A-side	B-side	Label	Country	Album	Format
1975	"For the Children's Sake"	"You Can Keep Your Money"	A&M	US/Europe	Hummingbird	7"
1976	"Troublemaker"	"Gypsy Skies"	A&M	US/Europe	We Can't Go On Meeting Like This	7"
1977	"Madatcha"	"Anna's Song"	A&M	US/Europe	Diamond Nights	7"

Boxer

Date of issue	A-side	B-side	Label	Country	Album	Format
1976	"Hey Bulldog" (this song only)	"Loony Ali"	Virgin	UK/US/Europe	A)Bloodletting; B)Below the Belt	7"

Widowmaker

Date of issue	A-side	B-side	Label	Country	Album	Format
1976	"On the Road"	"Pin a Rose on Me"	Jet	US/UK/Europe	Widowmaker	7"
1976	"When I met you"	"Pin a Rose On Me"	Jet	US/UK/Europe	Widowmaker	7"
1976	"Pin a Rose on Me"	"On the Road"	Jet	US/UK/Europe	Widowmaker	7"

Van Morrison

Date of issue	A-side	B-side	Label	Country	Album	Format
1978	"Wavelength"	"Checkin' It Out"	Mercury	US/Europe	Wavelength	7"
1979	"Kingdom Hall"	"Checkin' It Out"	Mercury	US/Europe	Wavelength	7"
1979	"Natalia"	"Lifetimes"	Mercury	US/Europe	Wavelength	7"

Humble Pie

Date of issue	A-side	B-side	Label	Country	Album	Format
1980	"Fool For a Pretty Face"	"You Soppy Pratt"	Atco/Jet	US/Europe	On to Victory	7"

Topper Headon

Date of issue	A-side	B-side	Label	Country	Album	Format
1986	"Leave it to Luck"	"Casablanca"	Mercury	UK/Europe	Waking Up	7"
1986	"I'll Give You Everything"	"You're So Cheeky"	Mercury	UK/Europe	Side A Waking Up	7"
1986	"Leave It to Luck"/"Casablanca"	"East Versus West"/"Got to Get Out of This Heat"	Mercury	UK/Europe	Waking Up	12"

Jeff Beck

Date of issue	A-side	B-side	Label	Country	Album	Format
1991	"People Get Ready"	"New Ways/Train Train" (this song only)	Mercury	UK/Europe	Beckology	CD

=== Album credits as collaborator ===
This list is of the original record and CD releases on which Tench is credited and does not include other releases or re-issues with the same or different track listings.

Year	Artist	Album	Label
1970	Gass	Juju	Polydor
1970	Gass	Gass (re-issue of Juju)	Polydor
1970	Gass	Supergroups Vol 2 (track 1 "Black Velvet")	Polydor
1971	Gass	Catch My Soul	Polydor
1971	The Jeff Beck Group	Rough and Ready	Epic
1972	The Jeff Beck Group	Jeff Beck Group	Epic
1972	Ginger Baker	Stratavarious	Atco
1973	Hanson	Now Hear This	Manticore
1973	Linda Lewis	Fathoms Deep	Reprise
1974	Freddie King	Burglar	RSO
1974	Linda Lewis	Heart Strings	Reprise
1975	Freddie King	Larger than life	RSO
1975	Hummingbird	Hummingbird	A&M
1975	Streetwalkers	Downtown Flyers	Mercury/Vertigo
1975	Streetwalkers	Live at the BBC	BBC
1976	Streetwalkers	Red Card	Mercury/Vertigo
1976	Hummingbird	We Can't Go On Meeting Like This	A&M
1976	Widowmaker (UK)	Widowmaker	United Artists
1977	Streetwalkers	Vicious but Fair	Mercury/Vertigo
1977	Hummingbird	Diamond Nights	A&M
1977	Streetwalkers	Live Streetwalkers	Mercury/Vertigo
1978	Van Morrison	Wavelength	Mercury
1979	Axis Point	Axis Point	RCA
1979	Boxer	Bloodletting	Virgin
1979	Van Morrison	Van Morrison Live at the Roxy (promotional release)	Warner Bros
1980	Humble Pie	On to Victory	Atco
1980	Eric Burdon	Darkness Darkness	Polydor
1981	Humble Pie	Go for the Throat	Atco
1986	Topper Headon	Waking Up	Mercury
1986	Various artists	Live in World	EMI
1989	Roger Chapman	Walking the Cat	Castle
1990	Roger Chapman	Hybrid and Lowdown	Polydor
1991	Jeff Beck	Beckology	Epic/Legacy
1991	Streetwalkers	Best of Streetwalkers	Vertigo
1992	Freddie King	Stayin' Home with the Blues	Universal/Spectrum
1994	Alan Price & The Electric Blues Company	Covers	AP
1994	Chapman Whitney Streetwalkers	BBC Radio 1 in Concert	Swansong
1995	Various artists	Rattlesnake Guitar tribute to Peter Green	EMI
1996	Alan Price & The Electric Blues Company	A Gigster's Life for Me	Sanctuary
1998	Ruby Turner	Call Me by My Name	Indigo
1998	Ginger Baker	Do What You Like	Polygram
2003	Al Slavik	The Secret One	Slavik
2005	Tim Hinkley	Hinkley's Heroes	Akarma
2006	Steve Marriott	Tribute	Darlings of Wapping Wharf
2010	Various Artists	This is The Blues. Vol 2	Eagle
2010	Freddie King	Texas Flyer 1974–1976	Eagle

== DVD and video ==
- Van Morrison: Van Morrison in Ireland. Video (1981)
- Steve Marriott: Astoria Memorial Concert 2001. DVD (2004)
- Streetwalkers: Live at Rockpalast DVD (2013)

== Sources ==
- Baker, Ginger and Ginette.Hellraiser: The Autobiography of the World's Greatest Drummer, John Blake Publishing (2009). ISBN 978-1-84454-817-0
- Bogdanov, Bush, Woodstra, Erlewine. Allmusic guide to soul: the definitive guide to R&B and soul. Backbeat (2003). ISBN 978-0-87930-744-8
- Carson, Annette. Jeff Beck: Crazy Fingers. Backbeat (2001). ISBN 978-0-87930-632-8
- Burdon, Eric and Marshall Craig, Jeff. Don't Let Me Be Misunderstood, Perseus Books Group (2002). ISBN 978-1-56025-448-5
- Celmins, Martin. Peter Green Founder of Fleetwood Mac, foreword by BB King. Sanctuary Publishing, (1998) 2nd edition. ISBN 1-86074-233-5
- Collis, John. Van Morrison: Inarticulate Speech of the Heart. Da Capo Press. (1996). ISBN 978-0-306-80811-1
- Frame, Pete. Rock Family Trees. Omnibus Press (March 1993) ISBN 0-7119-0465-0
- Graff, Gary. Music Hound Rock: The Essential Guide. Visible Ink Press, (1999). Cat no MH10008.
- Brock, Helander. The Rock Who's Who. Schirmer Books, (1996). 2nd edition. ISBN 0-02-871031-2
- Hewitt, Paulo and Hellier, John. Steve Marriott – All Too Beautiful... Helter Skelter, (2004). ISBN 1-900924-44-7
- Hjort, Chris and Hinman, Doug. Jeff's book : A Chronology of Jeff Beck's Career 1965–1980 : From the Yardbirds to Jazz-Rock. Rock 'n' Roll Research Press, (2000). ISBN 0-9641005-3-3
- Jasper, Tony and Oliver, Derek. The International Encyclopedia of Hard Rock & Heavy Metal. Facts on File (1985). Digitized (30 August 2007). ISBN 978-0-8160-1100-1
- Joynson, Vernon. The Tapestry of Delights – The Comprehensive Guide to British Music of the Beat, R&B, Psychedelic and Progressive Eras 1963–1976. Borderline (2006). Reprinted (2008). ISBN 1-899855-15-7
- Larkin, Colin (1995). The Encyclopedia of Popular Music. Vol. 7. New York: MUZE: Oxford University Press. ISBN 978-0-19-531373-4.
- Larkin, Colin (1999). The Encyclopedia of Popular Music (first ed.). Virgin Books. ISBN 0-7535-0257-7.
- Madsen, Pete. Funk Guitar And Bass: Know the Players, Play the Music. Backbeat (2007). ISBN 978-0-87930-894-0
- Muise, Dan. Gallagher, Marriott, Derringer & Trower: Their lives and music. Hal Leonard Corporation (2002). ISBN 978-0-634-02956-1
- Putterford, Mark. Phil Lynott the Rocker. Omnibus Press (11 March 2002). ISBN 0-7119-9104-9
- Rees, Dafydd and Rampton, Luke. Rock Movers & Shakers. ABC-CLIO (1991) revised. Original from the University of Michigan. Digitized (29 December 2006). ISBN 978-0-87436-661-7
- Roberts, David. British Hit Singles & Albums 19th edition. London: Guinness World Records Limited, (2006). ISBN 1-904994-10-5
- Rogan, Johnny (2006). Van Morrison: No Surrender. Vintage Books. ISBN 0-09-943183-1.
- Ruppli, Michel and the Atlantic Recording Corporation. Atlantic Records: A discography. Greenwood Press, (1979). Item notes ver 3. Digitized (29 August 2007) ISBN 978-0-313-21174-4
- Rusch, Bob (1996). Cadence. Vol. 22.
- Schmitt, Roland (2011). The Small Faces and Other Stories. Bobcat Books. ISBN 9780857124517.
- Strong, Martin Charles and Peel, John. The Great Rock Discography. Canongate US (2004). 7th edition. ISBN 978-1-84195-615-2
- York, William. Who's Who in Rock Music. Atomic Press (1978). Original from the University of Michigan. Digitized (30 August 2007). ISBN 978-0-684-17343-6
