= Jeff Beck Group (album) =

Studio album by The Jeff Beck Group
- Released: 1 May 1972
- Recorded: January 1972
- Studios: TMI, Memphis, Tennessee
- Genre: Jazz rock
- Length: 40:29
- Label: Epic
- Producer: Steve Cropper

The Jeff Beck Group chronology
Rough and Ready (1971)	Jeff Beck Group (1972)	Beck, Bogert & Appice (1973)

Jeff Beck Group is the fourth and final studio album by the Jeff Beck Group and the second album with the line up of Jeff Beck, Bobby Tench, Clive Chaman, Max Middleton and Cozy Powell. The album was produced by Steve Cropper and often referred to as the Orange Album, because of the orange which appears prominently at the top of the front cover.

== History ==
In January 1972, the second Jeff Beck Group flew to the US and joined Beck at TMI Studios in Memphis, Tennessee. Some of the songs they worked on were already in their stage act and unlike Rough and Ready (1971) they also recorded five cover songs for this album, including a new version of Ashford & Simpson's "I Can't Give Back the Love I Feel for You" and Carl Perkins's Sun Records release, "Glad All Over" (1957).

The Cropper and Beck collaboration "Sugar Cane" was one of several songs written while in the studio. At an "end of recording party", Beck was congratulated by Don Nix on his version of "Going Down", which Nix had written and was originally released by the band Moloch in 1969. Freddie King had covered the song in 1971.

The album was released in the US on 1 May 1972. The UK release was held back until 9 June the same year and tours of the UK and the US followed. No singles were released from this album.

== Critical reception ==
Professional ratings
Review scores
Source	Rating
AllMusic	3/5 stars
Christgau's Record Guide	C+
The Rolling Stone Album Guide	2/5 stars

Jeff Beck Group was not well received by contemporary music critics. OZ magazine's Charles Shaar Murray gave it a negative review, while Billy Walker of Sounds found it inferior to Rough and Ready, and NME's Roy Carr felt that the quality of the performances "far exceeds that of the material". In his review for Rolling Stone, John Mendelsohn was highly impressed by Beck's "genius" playing, but found it hampered by the rest of the band: "When either Bob Tench's vocals or Max Middleton's usually pleasant but seldom arresting and never-smoothly-integrated jazz piano are basking therein, Jeff Beck Group's music is mostly just dull — commonplace and predictable." Rob Mackie from the Record Mirror expressed a similar sentiment and said that listeners would not be able to tell whether they are "listening to the band led by one of Britain's best ever guitarists".

In a positive review, Chris Welch from Melody Maker hailed Jeff Beck Group as "the boldest Beck guitar we've heard for a long time" because of Beck's technical ability and suspenseful phrasing. David Hughes wrote in Disc Music Echo that "..the mood and tempo changes and you are hooked to the end". On the other hand, Robert Christgau expressed contempt for how Beck's technical abilities were praised in a 1981 review: "I agree that Beck's choppy chops occasionally surprise, but that's only because he wastes so much time refining heavy (not blues or even blooze) clichés."

== Track listing ==
Side one
No.	Title	Writer(s)	Length
1.	"Ice Cream Cakes"	Jeff Beck	5:40
2.	"Glad All Over"	Aaron Schroeder, Sid Tepper, Beck	2:58
3.	"Tonight I'll Be Staying Here with You"	Bob Dylan	4:59
4.	"Sugar Cane"	Beck, Steve Cropper	4:07
5.	"I Can't Give Back the Love I Feel for You"	Valerie Simpson, Nickolas Ashford, Brian Holland	2:42
Total length:			20:37

Side two
No.	Title	Writer(s)	Length
6.	"Going Down"	Don Nix	6:51
7.	"I Got to Have a Song"	Stevie Wonder, Don Hunter, Lula Mae Hardaway, Paul Riser	3:26
8.	"Highways"	Beck	4:41
9.	"Definitely Maybe"	Beck	5:02
Total length:			20:09

== Band members ==
- Bobby Tench – vocals
- Jeff Beck – guitars
- Max Middleton – keyboards
- Clive Chaman – bass guitar
- Cozy Powell – drums

== Charts ==
Chart (1972)	Peak position
Australian Albums (Kent Music Report)	46
Canada Top Albums/CDs (RPM)	15
US Billboard 200	19

== Certifications ==
Region	Certification	Certified units/sales
United States (RIAA)	Gold	500,000^{^}
^{^} Shipments figures based on certification alone.

== Discography ==
=== Original release ===
- Epic (US) PE 31331 LP May 1972
- Epic EPC 40 64899 LP June 1972

=== Reissues ===
- Epic 31331 (1990)
- Epic MHCP584 (2005)
- Sony 4710462 (2006)
- Sony Japan 961 (2007)
- Sony Japan MHCP584 (2008)
- Audio Fidelity AFZTL 1515 (2012, remastered 180 gram)
- Audio Fidelity AFZ5 219 (2015, 4.0 Hybrid SACD)

== References and further reading ==
- Carson, Annette (2002). Jeff Beck: Crazy Fingers. Backbeat books. ISBN 0-87930-632-7.
- Hjort, Chris; Hinman, Doug (2000). A chronology of Jeff Beck's career 1965-1980 : from the Yardbirds to Jazz-Rock. Rock 'n' Roll Research Press. ISBN 0-9641005-3-3.
