= Truth (Jeff Beck album) =

Studio album by The Jeff Beck Group (as Jeff Beck)
- Released: 29 July 1968
- Recorded: 16–17 May 1966; 14–26 May 1968
- Studios: Abbey Road, Olympic and De Lane Lea, London
- Genres: Blues rock; hard rock; heavy metal
- Length: 40:16
- Labels: EMI Columbia (UK), Epic (US)
- Producer: Mickie Most

The Jeff Beck Group (as Jeff Beck) chronology
Truth (1968)	Beck-Ola (1969)

Truth is the debut studio album by English guitarist Jeff Beck, released on 29 July 1968 in the United States on Epic Records and on 4 October 1968 in the United Kingdom on Columbia Records. It introduced the talents of his backing band the Jeff Beck Group, specifically vocalist Rod Stewart and bassist/guitarist Ronnie Wood, to a larger audience, and peaked at number 15 on the Billboard Top LPs chart. In retrospect, Truth has been widely hailed as classic of its era and one of the earliest examples of heavy metal music.

== Content and background ==
After leaving the Yardbirds in late 1966, Jeff Beck had released three commercial singles, two in 1967 featuring himself on lead vocals, and one without vocals in 1968. All had been hits on the British singles chart, and all were characterized by songs aimed at the pop chart on the A-side at the behest of producer Mickie Most. Harder rock and blues-based numbers were featured on the B-sides, and for music on the album, Beck opted to pursue the latter course.

Recording sessions for the album took place over four days, 14–15 May and 25–26 May 1968. Nine eclectic tracks were taken from these sessions, including covers of "Ol' Man River" by Jerome Kern, the Tudor period melody "Greensleeves", and Bonnie Dobson's "Morning Dew", a 1966 hit single for Tim Rose. Beck acknowledged two giants of Chicago blues in songs by Willie Dixon – Muddy Waters' "You Shook Me" and Howlin' Wolf's "I Ain't Superstitious".

The album starts with "Shapes of Things", a song from Beck's old band. Three originals were credited to "Jeffrey Rod", a pseudonym for Beck and Stewart, all reworkings of existing blues songs: "Let Me Love You" by Buddy Guy; "Rock My Plimsoul" and "Blues Deluxe" which respectively derive from "Rock Me Baby" and "Gambler's Blues" by B.B. King. For "Blues Deluxe", Beck overdubbed audience reactions from a sound effects record to create a live atmosphere, a choice he later regretted.

"Plimsoul" had already been recorded for the B-side to the 1967 single "Tallyman". The tenth track, "Beck's Bolero", an instrumental featuring Jimmy Page, John Paul Jones, Keith Moon, and future Beck group pianist Nicky Hopkins, had been edited and remixed for stereo from the earlier B-side to "Hi Ho Silver Lining". Due to contractual conflicts, Moon had been credited on the original album as "You Know Who".

The cover art is a double exposure photograph of model Celia Hammond, who was dating Beck at the time, by photographer Stephen Goldblatt.

== Reception and legacy ==
Retrospective professional reviews
Review scores
Source	Rating
AllMusic	5/5 stars
The Encyclopedia of Popular Music	3/5 stars
The Great Rock Discography	6/10
MusicHound Rock	4.5/5 stars
The Rolling Stone Album Guide	3.5/5 stars

Reviewing for Rolling Stone in 1968, Al Kooper called Truth a "classic" and a contemporary version of the 1966 Blues Breakers with Eric Clapton LP, saying the Beck group "swing like mad on this record."

Truth has since been regarded as a seminal work of heavy metal because of its use of blues toward a hard rock approach. According to Pete Prown and HP Newquist, "although some have claimed that this disc was the first metal album, the sound actually leaned more towards a heavy brand of blues rock." Classic Rock magazine ranked Truth eighth on its list of the 30 greatest British blues rock albums; an accompanying blurb read, "it was an album that not only helped establish the British blues rock sound, but featured many of its best exponents." Tom Scholz of Boston has listed it as his favorite album on Gibson's online magazine, stating, "I knew Jeff Beck's Truth album inside out..." Reviewing its historical significance, author Sean Egan commented that the Truth line-up, if it had remained intact, could have produced "a string of classic albums", but he also noted the large number of cover songs showed "a lack of songwriting base".

Blues guitarist Joe Bonamassa recorded a studio version of "Blues Deluxe" on his 2003 album Blues Deluxe and recorded live versions on Live at Rockpalast (2005), and Live from the Royal Albert Hall (2009). Bonamassa also played "Beck's Bolero", "Let Me Love You Baby" (and "Spanish Boots" and "Plynth (Water Down the Drain)" from the Beck-Ola album) in his Salute to the British Blues Explosion tour featuring the music of Beck, Clapton and Page in July 2016.

On 10 October 2006, Legacy Recordings remastered and reissued the album for compact disc with eight bonus tracks. Included were two earlier takes of "You Shook Me" and "Blues Deluxe", the latter without the overdubbed applause, and the six tracks making up the three singles by Beck. The B-side to the 1968 single "Love Is Blue", "I've Been Drinking", was another "Jeffrey Rod" special, this time reconfiguring the Johnny Mercer song "Drinking Again".

== Track listing ==
Side one
No.	Title	Writer(s)	Length
1.	"Shapes of Things"	Jim McCarty, Keith Relf, Paul Samwell-Smith	3:22
2.	"Let Me Love You"	Jeff Beck, Rod Stewart	4:44
3.	"Morning Dew"	Bonnie Dobson	4:40
4.	"You Shook Me"	Willie Dixon, J. B. Lenoir	2:33
5.	"Ol' Man River"	Jerome Kern, Oscar Hammerstein II	4:01
Total length:			19:23

Side two
No.	Title	Writer(s)	Length
1.	"Greensleeves"	Traditional	1:50
2.	"Rock My Plimsoul"	Beck, Stewart	4:13
3.	"Beck's Bolero"	Jimmy Page	2:54
4.	"Blues De Luxe"	Beck, Stewart	7:33
5.	"I Ain't Superstitious"	Dixon	4:53
Total length:			21:31

2006 CD bonus tracks
No.	Title	Writer(s)	Length
11.	"I've Been Drinking" (stereo mix)	Beck, Stewart	3:25
12.	"You Shook Me" (take 1)	Dixon, Lenoir	2:31
13.	"Rock My Plimsoul" (stereo mix of single version)	Beck, Stewart	3:42
14.	"Beck's Bolero" (mono single mix)	Page	3:11
15.	"Blues De Luxe" (take 1)	Beck, Stewart	7:31
16.	"Tallyman"	Graham Gouldman	2:46
17.	"Love Is Blue"	André Popp, Pierre Cour, Brian Blackburn	2:57
18.	"Hi Ho Silver Lining" (stereo mix)	Scott English, Laurence Weiss	3:46

== Personnel ==
- Jeff Beck – electric guitars, acoustic guitar on "Greensleeves"; pedal steel guitar on "Shapes of Things"; bass guitar on "Ol' Man River"; lead vocals on "Tallyman" and "Hi Ho Silver Lining", co-lead vocals on "Let Me Love You"
- Rod Stewart – lead vocals, backing vocals on "Hi Ho Silver Lining" and "Tallyman" and "I Ain't Superstitious"
- Ronnie Wood – bass guitar
- Micky Waller – drums

Additional credited personnel

- John Paul Jones – bass guitar on "Hi Ho Silver Lining" and "Beck's Bolero"; Hammond organ on "Ol' Man River" and "You Shook Me"; arrangements on "Hi Ho Silver Lining"
- Nicky Hopkins – piano on "Morning Dew", "You Shook Me", "Beck's Bolero" and "Blues Deluxe"
- Keith Moon (credited as "You Know Who") – drums on "Beck's Bolero"; timpani on "Ol' Man River"

Additional uncredited personnel

- Madeline Bell – backing vocals on "I've Been Drinking"
- John Carter and Ken Lewis – backing vocals on "Tallyman"
- Clem Cattini – drums on "Hi Ho Silver Lining"
- Aynsley Dunbar – drums on "Tallyman" and "Rock My Plimsoul (single version)"
- Jimmy Page – 12-string Fender Electric XII guitar on "Beck's Bolero"
- unknown Scottish bagpipe player – bagpipes on "Morning Dew"
- unknown studio orchestra – orchestra on "Love Is Blue"

Production personnel

- Mickie Most – producer
- Ken Scott – engineer
- Stephen Goldblatt — front cover photograph

== Charts ==
Chart (1968)	Peak position
Canada Top Albums/CDs (RPM)	37
US Billboard 200	15

Chart (2023–2025)	Peak position
Hungarian Physical Albums (MAHASZ)	25
Scottish Albums (Official Charts)	61

== Certifications ==
Region	Certification	Certified units/sales
United States (RIAA)	Gold	500,000^{^}
^{^} Shipments figures based on certification alone.
