= Beck-Ola =

Studio album by the Jeff Beck Group
- Released: June 1969
- Recorded: 3–19 April 1969
- Studios: De Lane Lea, Abbey Road, Trident, London; Mirasound, New York City
- Genres: Blues rock; hard rock; heavy metal
- Length: 30:29
- Label: Epic
- Producer: Mickie Most

The Jeff Beck Group chronology
Truth (1968)	Beck-Ola (1969)	Rough and Ready (1971)

Beck-Ola is the second studio album by English guitarist Jeff Beck, and the first credited to the Jeff Beck Group. It was released in June 1969 by Epic Records in the United States and the following August by Columbia Records in the United Kingdom. The album peaked at No. 15 on the Billboard 200, and at No. 39 on the UK Albums Chart. The album's title puns on the name of the Rock-Ola jukebox company.

== Background and content ==
The group released their first album Truth during 1968 and by the end of the year drummer Micky Waller was replaced by Tony Newman, as Jeff Beck wanted to take the music in a heavier direction and he viewed Waller as more of a finesse drummer in the style of Motown. Pianist Nicky Hopkins, who had also played on Truth, was asked to join the band full-time for his work in the studio.

Recording sessions for the album took place over six days in April 1969 – the 3rd, 6th, 8th, 10th, 11th and 19th. Two covers of Elvis Presley tunes were chosen, "All Shook Up" and "Jailhouse Rock", as well as "Girl From Mill Valley", an instrumental by and prominently featuring Hopkins. The remaining four tracks consist of band originals, with the instrumental "Rice Pudding" ending the album dramatically cold.

The album cover features a reproduction of Belgian surrealist artist René Magritte's The Listening Room. The tag "Cosa Nostra", Italian for "Our Thing", is written beside "Beck-Ola" on the back cover to the original vinyl issue.

Following the sessions for this album, the Jeff Beck Group toured the United States. They were scheduled to play Woodstock and are listed on posters promoting the festival, but by then internal friction had reached the breaking point and both Ronnie Wood and Rod Stewart were out of the band. Stewart and Wood would form the Faces with members of the Small Faces in 1969, while Hopkins played Woodstock with Jefferson Airplane, joined Quicksilver Messenger Service, and toured the world with the Rolling Stones in 1971, 1972 and 1973. Beck himself would be out of action by December due to an automobile accident.

== Reception and legacy ==
Professional ratings
Review scores
Source	Rating
AllMusic	4.5/5 stars
Rolling Stone	(favorable)
The Rolling Stone Album Guide	2.5/5 stars
The Village Voice	C−
The Vinyl District	A-

In a contemporary review for The Village Voice, music critic Robert Christgau was unimpressed by the album and facetiously remarked that Stewart and Beck had encouraged Hopkins' overblown playing. At the time, Beck commented on the album cover the impossibility of coming up with anything original, and that Beck-Ola indeed was not. Although a short album at half an hour, it is regarded, along with its predecessor, as a seminal work of heavy metal due to its use of blues toward a hard rock approach and the squaring off of Beck's guitar against Stewart's vocals, duplicated the same year by Beck's good friend Jimmy Page with his singer Robert Plant in Led Zeppelin.

On 10 October 2006, Legacy Recordings remastered and reissued the album for compact disc with four bonus tracks, all of which had been previously unreleased. Included were two early takes of the Presley covers, one done at Abbey Road Studios in January, a jam on "Sweet Little Angel" by B.B. King done the previous November with the Waller edition of the band, and a song intended as a single by producer Mickie Most but never issued.

== Track listing ==
Side one
No.	Title	Writer(s)	Length
1.	"All Shook Up"	Otis Blackwell, Elvis Presley	4:49
2.	"Spanish Boots"	Ronnie Wood, Jeff Beck, Rod Stewart	3:32
3.	"Girl from Mill Valley"	Nicky Hopkins	3:44
4.	"Jailhouse Rock"	Jerry Leiber and Mike Stoller	3:12

Side two
No.	Title	Writer(s)	Length
1.	"Plynth (Water Down the Drain)"	Hopkins, Wood, Stewart	3:05
2.	"The Hangman's Knee"	Tony Newman, Beck, Hopkins, Stewart, Wood	4:47
3.	"Rice Pudding"	Hopkins, Wood, Beck, Newman	7:20

- Sides one and two were combined as tracks 1–7 on CD reissues.

2004 CD bonus tracks
No.	Title	Writer(s)	Length
8.	"Sweet Little Angel"	B.B. King	7:57
9.	"Throw Down a Line"	Hank Marvin	2:54
10.	"All Shook Up" (Early version)	Blackwell, Presley	3:18
11.	"Jailhouse Rock" (Early version)	Leiber, Stoller	3:11

== Personnel ==
The Jeff Beck Group

- Jeff Beck – guitars, backing vocals on "Throw Down a Line"
- Rod Stewart – lead vocals
- Nicky Hopkins – piano, organ
- Ronnie Wood – bass guitar
- Tony Newman – drums

Additional personnel

- Micky Waller – drums on "Sweet Little Angel"
- Mickie Most – producer

== Charts ==
Chart (1969)	Peak position
Canada Top Albums/CDs (RPM)	19
UK Albums (Official Charts)	39
US Billboard 200	15

Chart (2025)	Peak position
Hungarian Physical Albums (MAHASZ)	26

== Certifications ==
Region	Certification	Certified units/sales
United States (RIAA)	Gold	500,000^{^}
^{^} Shipments figures based on certification alone.
