= Fender Electric XII =

12-string electric guitar

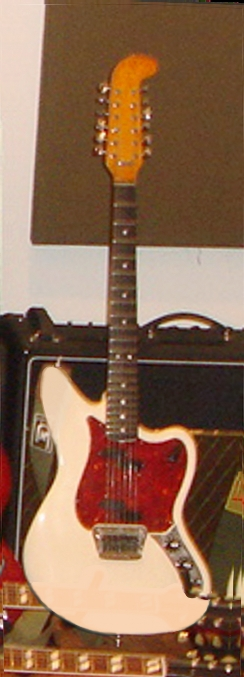
- Fender Electric XII
- Manufacturer: Fender
- Period: 1965–1969; 2019

Construction
- Body type: Solid
- Neck joint: Bolt-on

Woods
- Body: Alder
- Neck: Maple
- Fretboard: Rosewood; Pau Ferro

Hardware
- Pickup: 2 split single coil pickups

Colors available
- Sunburst (standard), candy apple red, olympic white, Lake Placid blue, Firemist gold, Alternate Reality series: Sunburst, Lake Placid blue, olympic white

The Fender Electric XII is a purpose-built 12-string electric guitar, designed for folk rockers. Instead of using a Stratocaster-body style, it uses one similar to a Jaguar/Jazzmaster body style. It also departed from the typical "Stratocaster"-style headstock, instead featuring a long headstock nicknamed the "hockey-stick" headstock to cope with the twelve tuners. The original Electric XII employed a unique split pickup design and had a 4-way pickup rotary selector allowing for neck, neck & bridge in parallel, in or out of phase, and bridge only options as opposed to the Alternate Reality version which sports a standard 3-way toggle switch for pickup selection. It also used a string-through-body design similar to a Telecaster to help increase sustain.

Designed by Leo Fender, the Fender Electric XII was introduced in late 1965 with the bulk of the production taking place in 1966 before it was discontinued around 1970. Unlike its competitors' electric 12-string models which were simply existing 6-string guitars with six extra strings, the Fender Electric XII was a purpose-built 12-string designed to capture a part of the folk-rock market. The bridge has an individual saddle for each string making precise intonation possible. The Electric XII was not particularly popular during its run, and by 1969, it was dropped from the Fender line before being reintroduced as a part of the Alternate Reality series in 2019. The body overstock was used for the Fender Custom (a.k.a. Fender Maverick).

== Notable players ==
- Dave Davies of The Kinks was the first notable user in Great Britain of an Electric XII, and the instrument can be heard on the track "I'm Not Like Everybody Else", released in 1966. There are several photos that were taken in 1966 where Ray Davies can be seen live on stage with the same guitar and there is a possibility that it was actually owned by him and not by Dave Davies.
- Pete Townshend, who used it extensively on the album Tommy.
- Tim Buckley.
- Andy Tielman of the Tielman Brothers used a Lake Placid Blue Electric XII during the 1960s.
- Bob Berryhill of The Surfaris had a Candy Apple Red Electric XII during the 1960s.
- Bruce Springsteen used a Fender Electric XII on stage during a brief period in the mid-1970s.
- Billy Strange used an Electric XII (bought for him by Brian Wilson) on The Beach Boys track "Sloop John B".
- George Harrison used Andy Fairweather Low's Fender Electric XII when he performed "If I Needed Someone" during the concerts that were performed with Eric Clapton in Japan in December 1991.
- Carl Wilson played a white prototype Electric XII during several concerts of The Beach Boys in 1965.
- Jimmy Page, who used it for the studio recording of Led Zeppelin's "Stairway to Heaven" and on Jeff Beck's "Beck's Bolero".
- Gene Clark of The Byrds was seen using one on a May 1965 television appearance.
- Eric Clapton used it for the recording of "Dance the Night Away" with the band Cream in 1967.
- Lou Reed and Sterling Morrison purchased matching Fender XIIs before the sessions for the Velvet Underground's eponymous third album in 1968.
- Johnny Winter also used one briefly (strung as a six-string) during the late 1960s and early 1970s.
- Pye Hastings used one during the early days of Caravan, notably on their album For Girls Who Grow Plump In The Night in 1973.
- Gustavo Cerati of Soda Stereo played and recorded with a Fender XII between 1988 and 1990, notably seen in the videos of "En la ciudad de la furia" and "de Música ligera".
- Andy Fairweather Low.
- Robin Guthrie, Cocteau Twins.
- Chad Taylor of Live prominently used a lake placid blue Fender XII both on stage and in the studio, most notably to write and record the single "Run to the Water", as well as several other tracks on the band's platinum album The Distance to Here.
- Krist Novoselic of Nirvana also played the Fender XII while he was in Sweet 75.
- Steve Vai.
- The Verve guitarist Nick McCabe used a Fender Electric XII for live performances on the band's 2008 comeback tour, notably on "Space and Time" from their 1997 album Urban Hymns.
- Tom Petty used a white Fender XII for the first half of his 2006 North American Tour instead of his signature Rickenbacker 12-string.
- John Pisano, of Herb Alpert and the Tijuana Brass used the Fender Electric XII extensively; it is heard in the intro of their recording of "Wade in the Water".
- The guitar is also seen played by Steve Bartek on the Oingo Boingo Farewell DVD/video.
- Jason Mozersky of Relentless7 also uses an Electric XII.
- Mike Einziger, guitarist of Californian band Incubus, used an Electric XII for the intro of the song "Love Hurts" off the band's 2008 album, Light Grenades.
- Roy Wood, guitarist of The Move, used an Electric XII in the songs "Blackberry Way" and "Flowers in the Rain".
- Robert Smith (musician) used a white Electric XII with a non-original maple fretboard when he performed live with Siouxsie and the Banshees in 1982.
- Noel Gallagher used a white Fender Alternate Reality Electric XII in 2019.
- Thurston Moore received one as a gift for his 60th birthday and used it in the recording of By the Fire.

== See also ==
- Fender Custom (a.k.a. Fender Maverick) – guitar made of overstock XII bodies
- Fender Stratocaster XII
- Fender Telecaster XII

== Sources ==
- "Fender Electric XII". GGJaguar's Guitarium and Ampeteria 1966 Fender Electric XII.
