= Ian Samwell =

English musician, songwriter and producer (1937–2003)

- Also known as: Sammy
- Born: Ian Ralph Samwell; 19 January 1937; Lambeth, South London, England
- Died: 13 March 2003 (aged 66) Sacramento, California, U.S.
- Occupations: Musician; singer-songwriter; record producer; guitarist
- Instruments: Guitar; bass guitar
- Years active: 1958–2003
- Labels: Decca; EMI; A&M; Island; Warner Bros. Records; Immediate
- Formerly of: The Drifters

Ian Ralph "Sammy" Samwell (19 January 1937 – 13 March 2003) was an English musician, singer-songwriter and record producer. He is best known as the writer of Cliff Richard's debut single "Move It" whilst a guitarist in Richard's backing group, the Drifters (later to become the Shadows after Samwell's departure). He also featured on the recording of this song as rhythm guitarist and played bass guitar.

Samwell became the in-house record producer of the British division of Warner Bros. Records during the late sixties and worked in their London office He was also known for his association with the rock band America and had his biggest commercial success with their hit single "A Horse with No Name".

Samwell wrote for many other British artists, including Joe Brown, Elkie Brooks, Kenny Lynch, and Dusty Springfield. He also worked with the Grateful Dead, Frank Zappa, Joni Mitchell, and Hummingbird. Several of his songs were recorded in Spanish by the Mexican group Los Teen Tops, and were released in Latin America and the Spanish-speaking territories of the world. He also worked as a record producer with Sounds Incorporated, Georgie Fame, John Mayall, and the mod band Small Faces, co-writing their 1965 hit single "Whatcha Gonna Do About It".

== Early years ==
Samwell was born in London, but grew up in Harrow. He performed his national service in the Royal Air Force.

== Career ==
Looking to join a band, Samwell heard Harry Webb, a credit control clerk, performing at the 2i's Coffee Bar in Soho. This led to his joining Webb's group as a guitarist. Shortly afterwards, Webb's manager Johnny Foster, suggested that Webb change his name to "Cliff Richards" as a stage name, however it was Samwell who stated that he should drop the "S" from that name, so that he would have two Christian names, and it would be also a tribute to Little Richard, the group was renamed Cliff Richard and the Drifters (who would become Cliff Richard and the Shadows).

They received a booking in Ripley and an audition with record producer Norrie Paramor and subsequently signed a recording contract with EMI's Columbia Records and Samwell wrote "Move It", which he stated was musically inspired by Chuck Berry. Paramor recorded the track with Drifters members Samwell and Terry Smart on drums and using session musicians Ernie Shear and Frank Clarke.

The song was initially intended as the B-side of their debut single, with the A-side being a cover of American artist Bobby Helms "Schoolboy Crush", but TV producer Jack Good ensured that it be Move It that be played on his television program Oh Boy!, on the back of this the disc was flipped and hence "Move It" became the A-side of their release and Schoolboy Crush" the B-side, The song reached No. 2 in the UK singles chart and is generally accepted as the first rock and roll song to originate from the United Kingdom.

Samwell played rhythm guitar on "Move It", but was edged out of the band when Hank Marvin and Jet Harris joined. He was then offered a songwriting contract and wrote Richard's second hit single, "High Class Baby", and several other early songs for Richard, such as "Dynamite".

In 1959, he wrote "Say You Love Me Too", which was recorded by the Isley Brothers and thus became the first song by a British songwriter to be recorded by an American R&B act.

In the summer of 1961, Samwell hosted some lunchtime record dance sessions at the Lyceum Ballroom in London, using his own collection of R&B and country rock records. Then in August, he was appointed first resident DJ on Sunday and Tuesday sessions, playing in front of a fast-growing audience of a couple of thousand, mainly made up of fans of the new, mod scene. Later, music historian Dave Godin stated that: "In some ways, the Lyceum was the first place that could merit the name discothèque". He was also a Disc Jockey at The Orchid Ballroom Purley, after the Lyceum.

He went on to work with other artists, as a staff producer at Warner Bros. Records in London. Samwell discovered the band America and produced their first album, America in 1972. Samwell is also credited with persuading their guitarist Dewey Bunnell to change the name of "Desert Song" to "A Horse with No Name", which became an international chart success. In 1974, Samwell produced the first of three albums he worked on with Hummingbird whose line-up included Bobby Tench and other former members of the Jeff Beck Group.

== Death ==
Samwell underwent a heart transplant in the 1990s and died in Sacramento, California on 13 March 2003, aged 66. Shortly before his death, he had been active in the Sacramento, California, music scene, working closely with several local acts. The Beer Dawgs album, Blonde on the Bayou, was his last production. His sons, Ralph Lewis Samwell and Tyson Haynes, both live in London.
