= The Jeff Beck Group =

English blues rock band

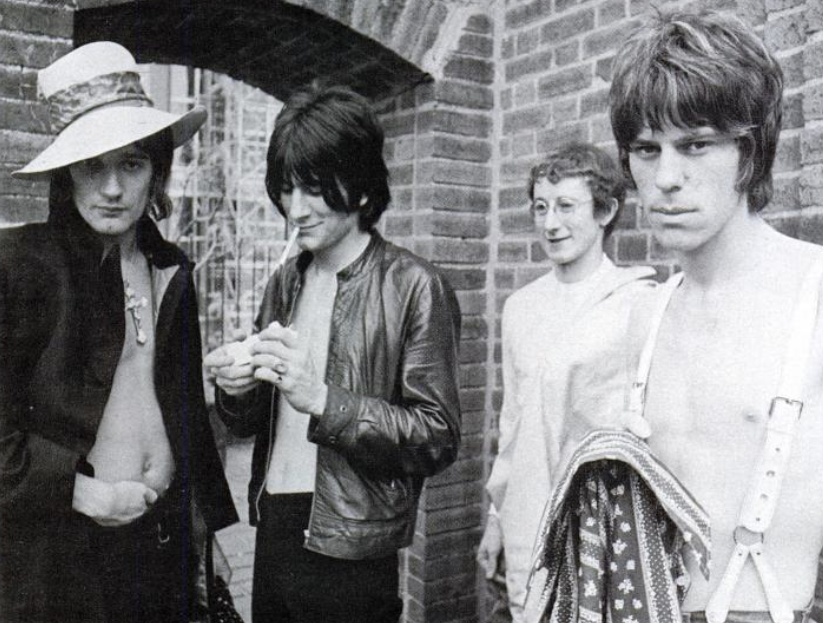
- The band in 1968: (left to right) Rod Stewart, Ronnie Wood, Micky Waller and Jeff Beck. Photo by Don Hunstein

Background information
- Origin: London, England
- Genres: Blues rock; hard rock; jazz fusion
- Years active: 1967–1969; 1970–1972
- Labels: Epic; CBS
- Spinoffs: Beck, Bogert & Appice; Faces
- Spinoff of: The Yardbirds
- Past members: Jeff Beck; Rod Stewart; Ronnie Wood; Jet Harris; Dave Ambrose; Clem Cattini; Viv Prince; Aynsley Dunbar; Ray Cook; Micky Waller; Nicky Hopkins; Tony Newman; Alex Ligertwood; Max Middleton; Clive Chaman; Cozy Powell; Bobby Tench

The Jeff Beck Group were a British rock band formed in London in January 1967 by former Yardbirds guitarist Jeff Beck. Their innovative approach to heavy-sounding blues, rhythm and blues and rock was a major influence on popular music.

== History ==
=== First group ===
The first Jeff Beck Group formed in London in early 1967 and included guitarist Jeff Beck, vocalist Rod Stewart, and rhythm guitarist Ronnie Wood, with bass players and drummers changing regularly. Early bass players were Jet Harris and Dave Ambrose, with Clem Cattini and Viv Prince trying out on drums. The lineup went through months of personnel changes, notably no fewer than four drummers, before settling on Aynsley Dunbar and switching Wood to bass. This lineup spent most of 1967 playing the UK club circuit and appeared several times on BBC Radio. Beck signed a personal management contract with record producer and manager Mickie Most, who had no interest in the group, only in Beck as a solo artist.

During 1967, the band released three singles in Europe and two in the United States, the first, "Hi Ho Silver Lining", being the most successful, reaching No. 14 on the UK singles chart; it included the instrumental "Beck's Bolero" as the B-side, which had been recorded several months earlier. The lineup for that session included Jimmy Page on rhythm guitar, John Paul Jones on bass, Keith Moon on drums, and Nicky Hopkins on piano. Frustrated that the band were not playing a strict enough blues set for his taste, drummer Dunbar left and was replaced by Roy Cook for one show, before Stewart recommended Micky Waller, a bandmate of his from Steampacket. Waller went on to play with the band all through 1968 and early 1969, and was their longest-lasting drummer.

Peter Grant, a road manager at the time, had been to the U.S. with the New Vaudeville Band, and was aware of the new concert and album-oriented rock FM radio format developing there. It was now possible to break out a band without using the "hit single" formula. Grant realised that Beck's band was ideal for this market and tried several times to buy Beck's contract from Most, who refused to let Beck go.

By early 1968 the band was considering disbanding, but Grant convinced them not to, and booked a short U.S. tour that began in early June.

Beck said the group "were literally down to one change of clothing each". Stewart has revealed that he and Wood were reduced to stealing hard-boiled eggs from the Automat on 57th street. Grant's first stop for them was at the Gorham Hotel in New York City, just south of Central Park. The Jeff Beck Group then did four shows at the Fillmore East, where they played second on the bill to the Grateful Dead. The New York Times ran a Robert Shelton article, "Jeff Beck Group Cheered in Debut", with the secondary headline "British Pop Singers Delight Fillmore East Audience," proclaiming that Beck and his group had upstaged the Grateful Dead. The reviews from The Boston Tea Party were as good or better: "By the time he got to his last number ... (the fans) were in a state of pandemonium the likes of which hadn't been witnessed since the Beatles hit town." By the time they wrapped up the tour at San Francisco's Fillmore West, Grant had secured them a new album contract with Epic Records.

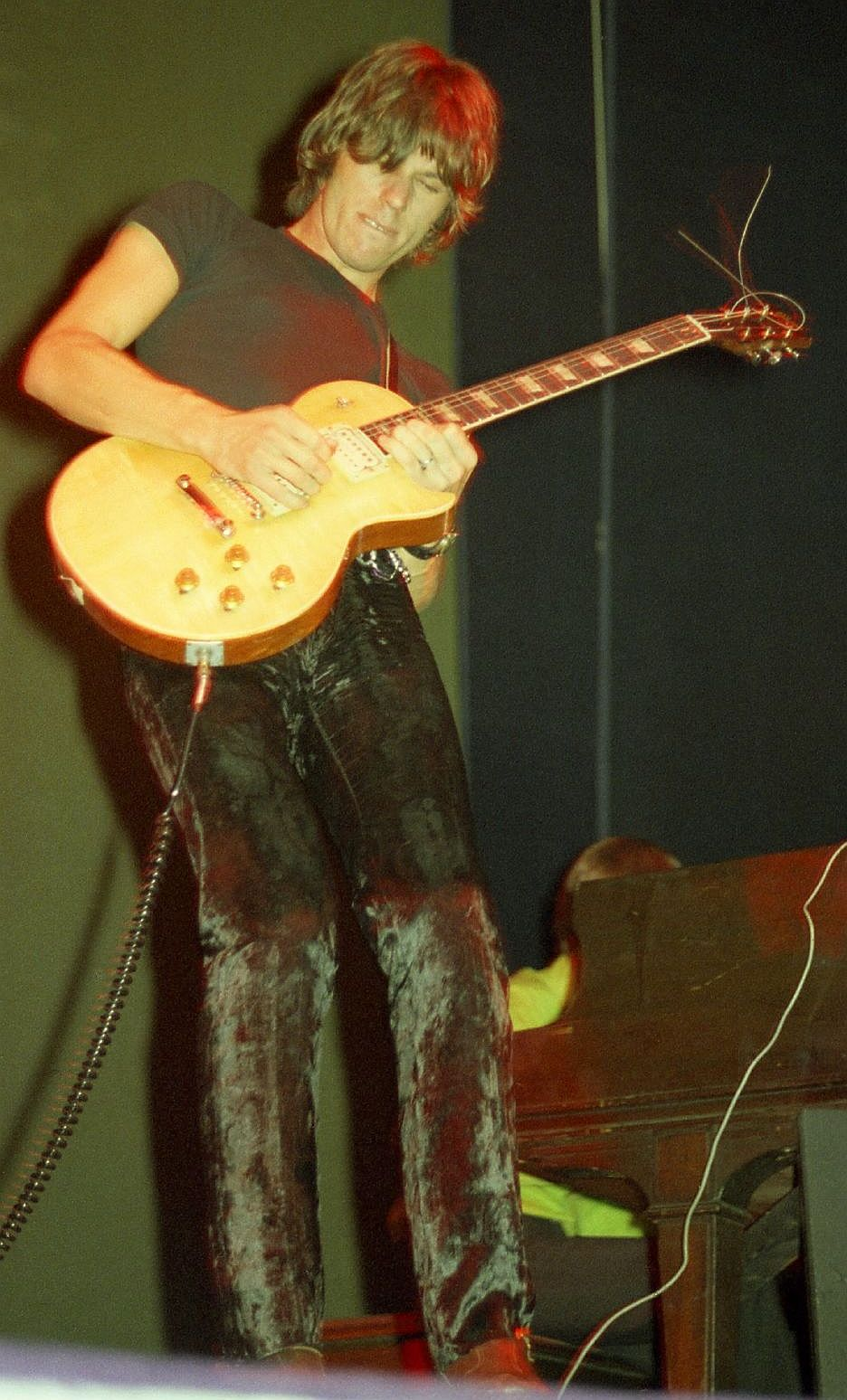
Beck with the Jeff Beck Group, 1968

The band quickly returned to England to record the album Truth (under the name "Jeff Beck"), which reached No. 15 in the U.S. charts. The tracks were recorded within two weeks, with overdubs added the following month. Mickie Most was busy with other projects at the time and delegated most of the work to Ken Scott, who basically recorded the band playing their live set in the studio. Beck's amplifier was apparently so loud, it was recorded from inside a closet. The extra lineup for these sessions included John Paul Jones on Hammond organ, drummer Keith Moon and Nicky Hopkins on piano. The core group, billed as the "Jeff Beck Group", returned to the U.S. for a tour to promote the release of Truth. Long-time Beck fan Jimi Hendrix jammed with the band at Steve Paul’s Scene during this and their following tours.

They embarked on their third tour in December 1968 with Hopkins who, although in poor health, decided he wanted to play live. He accepted Beck's invitation, even though he had been offered more money by Led Zeppelin. Later, he lamented that "We lost one of the greatest bands in Rock history." Even with his best intentions, the last leg of the tour was curtailed by illness. Beck then postponed a fourth, February 1969 U.S. tour. This was also because he felt they should not keep playing the same material with nothing new to add. New material was written, Waller was replaced by power drummer Tony Newman and Wood was dismissed, only to be rehired almost immediately. The success of Truth ignited new interest from Most and they recorded the album Beck-Ola at De Lane Lea Studios, engineered by Martin Birch. They released the single "Plynth" and laid down three Donovan backing tracks as a favour to Most. Two of them were used for his single "Barabajagal (Love Is Hot)".

In May 1969, the Jeff Beck Group embarked on their fourth U.S. tour, this time with Hopkins as a full-fledged member. The tour went smoothly, Beck-Ola was received extremely well, reaching No. 15 on the Billboard 200 album chart, but it was reported that there was now terrible in-fighting within the band. To illustrate, Rod Stewart's plans to leave the band may have been under consideration by this time; in July 1969, he brought current bandmate Wood and former bandmate Waller into the studio to record his debut full-length solo album, An Old Raincoat Won't Ever Let You Down, for Mercury Records.

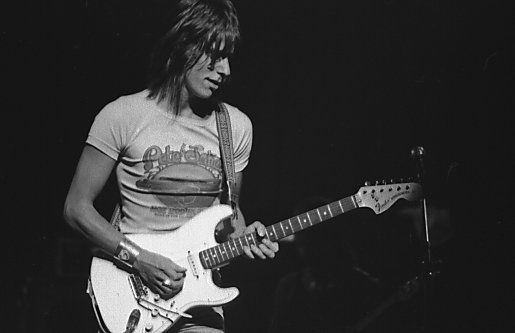
Jeff Beck with Fender Stratocaster

The Jeff Beck Group finished the tour and returned to England, only to return to the States in July 1969 for their fifth and final time. It was a short tour, mostly along the East Coast, including Maryland, their final Fillmore East appearance, and the Newport Jazz Festival. Beck broke up the band on the eve of the Woodstock Music Festival, at which they had been scheduled to perform, believing they were "not ready for that", later reminiscing that they would be "dated, frozen with that image, with the music not being quite right". Ronnie Wood has stated he considered it a shame, but Rod Stewart said he was glad they did not attend.

=== Second group ===
In April 1970, Beck reformed the Jeff Beck Group with vocalist Alex Ligertwood, keyboardist Max Middleton, drummer Cozy Powell and bassist Clive Chaman. In June 1971, Beck signed a record deal with CBS and was looking for a new singer. After hearing Bobby Tench perform with his band Gass, "Upstairs" at Ronnie Scott's club in Soho, London, Beck employed him as vocalist and rhythm guitarist.

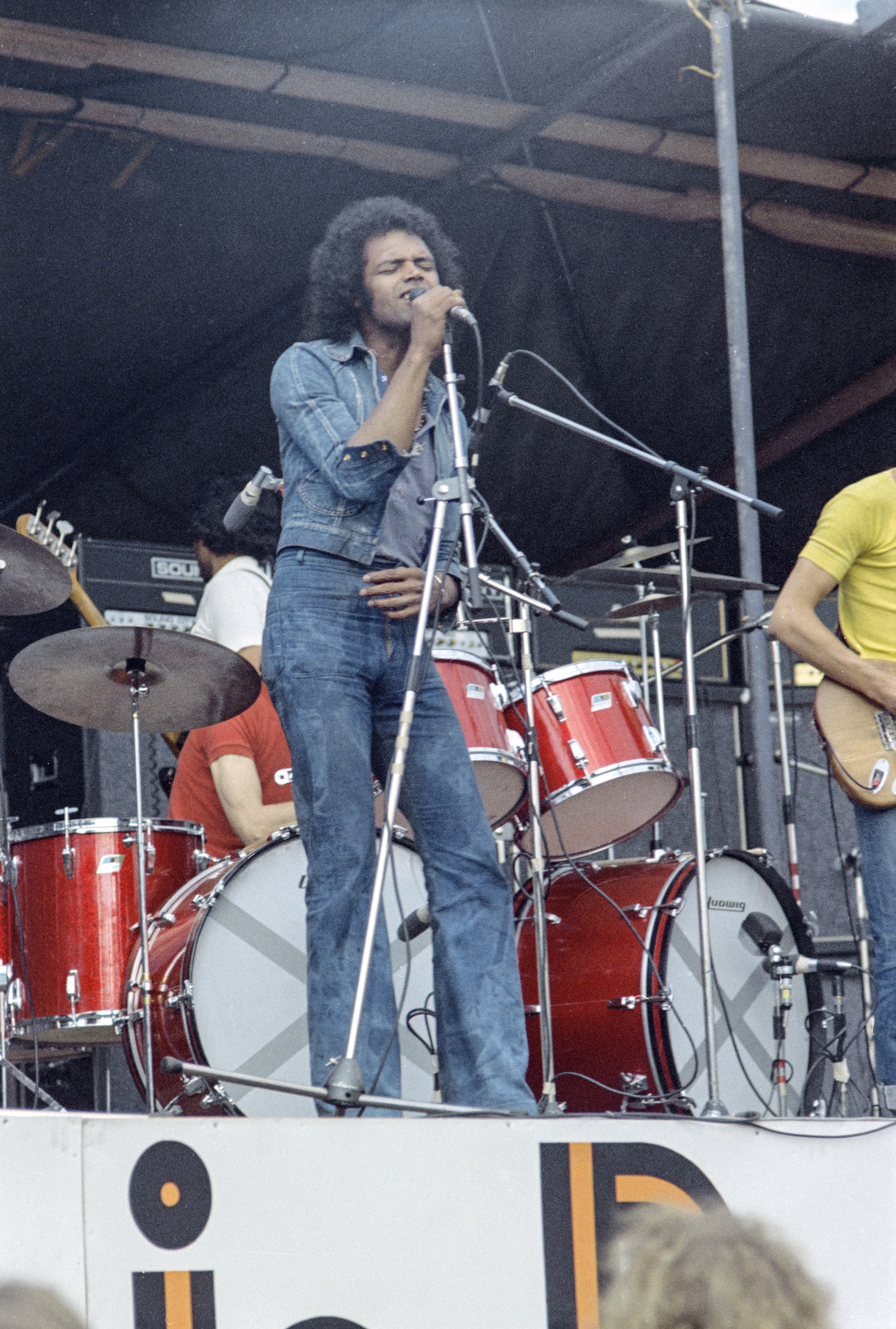
Bobby Tench fronting the group in 1971.

Tench was given only a few weeks to learn the lyrics and add his vocals to the studio album Rough and Ready, before mixing resumed on the tracks previously recorded in London by Beck and the other band members. The album was finished in July 1971 and they toured Finland, Holland, Switzerland and Germany. Rough and Ready was released in the UK on 25 October 1971, with the U.S. release following during February 1972. A sixteen-day promotional tour in the U.S. followed and the album eventually reached No. 46 in the album charts.

In January 1972, the band travelled to the U.S. to join Beck at TMI studios in Memphis, Tennessee. This is where they recorded the album Jeff Beck Group, using Steve Cropper as producer. Jeff Beck Group was released in the UK on 9 June 1972. The promotional tour that followed included an appearance on the BBC Radio 1 In Concert series, which was recorded on 29 June 1972. During the session they played "Definitely Maybe", which featured Tench playing guitar, a rare occasion while Tench played with Beck.

On 24 July 1972, the Jeff Beck Group was officially disbanded and Beck's management put out this statement: "The fusion of musical styles of the various members has been successful, within the terms of individual musicians, but they didn't feel it had led to the creation of a new musical style with the strength they had originally sought."

Beck appeared live using the Jeff Beck Group name when later appearing with Bobby Tench, Max Middleton, Tim Bogert and Carmine Appice before morphing to the trio Beck, Bogert & Appice.

== Discography ==
- Truth (as Jeff Beck) (1968)
- Beck-Ola (1969)
- Rough and Ready (1971)
- Jeff Beck Group (1972)
