= Rod Stewart discography =

Discography of British singer Rod Stewart

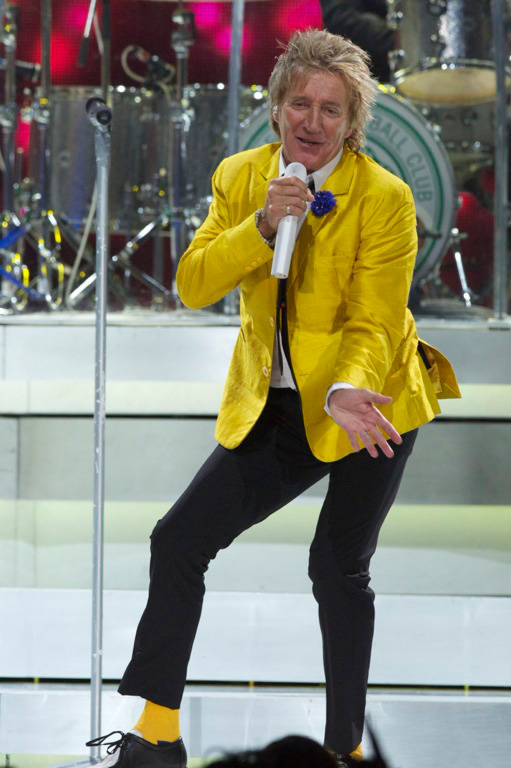
- Stewart performing in 2014
- Studio albums: 32
- Live albums: 4
- Compilation albums: 22
- Singles: 147
- Video albums: 13
- Music videos: 68

The following is the complete discography of British singer Rod Stewart. Throughout his career, Stewart has sold 120 million records worldwide, making him one of the world's best-selling music artists in history. According to Recording Industry Association of America (RIAA), he has sold 46.6 million albums and singles in the US. Billboard ranked him as the 15th Greatest Artist of all time (6th among male soloist). He is also the 20th Greatest Hot 100 artist of all time and the 13th Greatest Billboard 200 Artist of all time.

== Albums ==
=== Studio albums ===
Year	Album	Peak chart positions										Sales	Certifications
Year	Album	UK	AUS	CAN	GER	JPN	NLD	NOR	NZ	SWE	US	Sales	Certifications
1969	An Old Raincoat Won't Ever Let You Down	—	31	—	—	—	—	—	—	—	139	US: 250,000	
1970	Gasoline Alley	62	24	32	—	—	—	—	—	—	27		
1971	Every Picture Tells a Story	1	1	1	23	84	2	9	—	—	1	US: 2,500,000	BPI: Gold; RIAA: Platinum
1972	Never a Dull Moment	1	3	1	37	56	2	8	—	—	2	UK: 1,000,000	RIAA: Gold
1974	Smiler	1	8	11	—	65	—	19	29	—	13		BPI: Gold
1975	Atlantic Crossing	1	1	21	11	87	2	1	2	5	9	AUS: 400,000; SWE: 200,000	BPI: Platinum; ARIA: 4× Platinum; BVMI: Gold; RIAA: Gold
1976	A Night on the Town	1	1	1	29	23	5	1	1	1	2	UK: 1,000,000; SWE: 50,000	BPI: Platinum; ARIA: 6× Platinum; MC: 2× Platinum; RIAA: 2× Platinum
1977	Foot Loose & Fancy Free	3	1	1	34	19	1	6	1	6	2		BPI: Platinum; ARIA: 4× Platinum; MC: 4× Platinum; RIAA: 3× Platinum
1978	Blondes Have More Fun	3	1	1	9	2	3	2	1	1	1	UK: 600,000; SWE: 200,000	BPI: Platinum; ARIA: 2× Platinum; BVMI: Gold; RIAA: 3× Platinum
1980	Foolish Behaviour	4	9	21	23	19	8	12	3	3	12		BPI: Platinum; MC: Platinum; RIAA: Platinum
1981	Tonight I'm Yours	8	11	1	42	19	12	20	4	2	11		BPI: Gold; ARIA: Platinum; MC: 2× Platinum; RIAA: Platinum
1983	Body Wishes	5	14	15	2	19	6	10	25	3	30		BPI: Gold; BVMI: Platinum; MC: Platinum
1984	Camouflage	8	34	31	6	17	13	16	—	7	18		BPI: Silver; RIAA: Gold
1986	Every Beat of My Heart	5	26	9	4	28	13	12	—	3	28		BPI: Gold; BVMI: Gold
1988	Out of Order	11	23	2	6	67	37	11	47	1	20		BPI: Gold; GLF: Gold; MC: 5× Platinum; RIAA: 2× Platinum
1991	Vagabond Heart	2	1	2	3	34	31	6	2	2	10		BPI: Platinum; ARIA: 4× Platinum; BVMI: Platinum; GLF: Platinum; MC: 3× Platinum; RIAA: Platinum
1995	A Spanner in the Works	4	28	2	9	26	23	6	13	2	35		BPI: Gold; MC: Platinum; RIAA: Gold
1998	When We Were the New Boys	2	102	25	16	48	—	—	—	6	44	US: 285,000	BPI: Gold
2001	Human	9	55	—	9	66	—	—	—	13	50		BPI: Gold
2002	It Had to Be You: The Great American Songbook	8	5	10	26	—	11	16	46	24	4		BPI: 2× Platinum; ARIA: 4× Platinum; GLF: Gold; MC: 3× Platinum; RIAA: 3× Platinum
2003	As Time Goes By: The Great American Songbook, Volume II	4	7	1	38	152	35	—	42	8	2		BPI: 2× Platinum; ARIA: 2× Platinum; GLF: Gold; MC: 2× Platinum; RIAA: 2× Platinum
2004	Stardust: The Great American Songbook, Volume III	3	8	1	—	40	13	17	29	3	1		BPI: Platinum; ARIA: Platinum; GLF: Platinum; RIAA: Platinum; RMNZ: Gold
2005	Thanks for the Memory: The Great American Songbook, Volume IV	3	15	2	59	83	33	—	20	5	2		BPI: Platinum; ARIA: Gold; GLF: Gold; RIAA: Platinum
2006	Still the Same... Great Rock Classics of Our Time	4	16	1	8	30	51	—	1	5	1	UK: 362,941	BPI: Platinum; ARIA: Platinum; GLF: Gold; MC: Platinum; RIAA: Gold; RMNZ: 2× Platinum
2009	Soulbook	9	11	3	33	71	95	—	4	4	4		BPI: 2× Platinum; ARIA: Platinum; GLF: Gold; MC: Platinum; RMNZ: Platinum
2010	Fly Me to the Moon... The Great American Songbook Volume V	5	4	4	25	104	78	—	9	3	4	US: 363,000	BPI: Gold; ARIA: Gold; MC: Gold
2012	Merry Christmas, Baby	2	3	1	22	94	6	7	1	2	3	UK: 636,000; US: 858,000	BPI: 2× Platinum; ARIA: 2× Platinum; MC: 3× Platinum; RIAA: Platinum; RMNZ: 2× Platinum
2013	Time	1	6	4	4	25	34	25	5	7	7	US: 141,000	BPI: 2× Platinum; MC: Gold
2015	Another Country	2	9	25	7	103	15	20	8	14	20		BPI: Platinum
2018	Blood Red Roses	1	15	49	12	—	51	—	—	9	62	UK: 146,010	BPI: Gold
2021	The Tears of Hercules	5	39	—	17	—	81	—	—	46	—	UK: 78,406	BPI: Silver
2024	Swing Fever (with Jools Holland)	1	19	—	4	—	—	—	—	—	—		BPI: Silver

=== Live albums ===
Year	Album	Chart positions				Certifications
Year	Album	UK	AUS	NZ	US	Certifications
1974	Coast to Coast: Overture and Beginners (credited to Rod Stewart/Faces)	3	—	—	63	
1982	Absolutely Live	35	41	22	46	MC: Platinum; RIAA: Gold
1993	Unplugged...and Seated	2	4	13	2	BPI: Platinum; ARIA: Platinum; MC: 3× Platinum; RIAA: 3× Platinum
2014	Live 1976–1998: Tonight's the Night	82	—	—	—	

=== Compilation albums ===
Year	Album	Chart positions				Certifications
Year	Album	UK	AUS	NZ	US	Certifications
1972	Sing It Again Rod	1	11	—	31	BPI: Gold; MC: Platinum; RIAA: Gold
1976	The Best of Rod Stewart	19	13	9	90	BPI: Gold; BVMI: 3× Gold; MC: Platinum; RIAA: Gold
1977	The Best of Rod Stewart Vol. 2	—	—	—	102	
1979	Greatest Hits, Vol. 1	1	1	1	22	BPI: Platinum; ARIA: 4× Platinum; BVMI: Gold; MC: 4× Platinum; RIAA: 3× Platinum
1989	The Best of Rod Stewart	3	7	2	—	BPI: 8× Platinum; ARIA: 5× Platinum; BVMI: 2× Platinum
1989	Storyteller – The Complete Anthology: 1964–1990	23	5	1	54	BPI: Gold; ARIA: Gold; MC: Gold; RIAA: 2× Platinum; RMNZ: Gold
1990	Downtown Train – Selections from the Storyteller Anthology	—	—	—	20	MC: 2× Platinum; RIAA: 2× Platinum
1992	The Mercury Anthology	—	—	—	—	
1993	Lead Vocalist	3	96	32	—	BPI: Silver
1996	If We Fall in Love Tonight	8	22	11	19	ARIA: Platinum; BPI: Platinum; RIAA: Platinum
1999	Reason to Believe	—	—	—	—	
2001	A Little Misunderstood, The Sixties Sessions	—	—	—	—	
2001	The Story So Far: The Very Best of Rod Stewart	7	5	1	40	BPI: 4× Platinum; ARIA: 2× Platinum; RMNZ: 5× Platinum
2002	Reason to Believe: The Complete Mercury Studio Recordings	—	—	—	—	
2003	Encore: The Very Best Of – Vol. 2	—	—	—	66	
2003	Changing Faces – The Very Best of Rod Stewart & The Faces: The Definitive Collection 1969–1974 (credited to Rod Stewart & The Faces)	13	—	—	—	
2005	Gold	126	—	—	—	
2006	The Very Best of Rod Stewart	160	—	—	—	
2007	The Seventies Collection	20	—	—	—	
2007	The Complete American Songbook – Volumes I, II, III & IV	13	—	—	—	BPI: Gold; MC: 3× Platinum
2008	Some Guys Have All the Luck / The Definitive Rod Stewart	19	—	27	21	BPI: 3× Platinum; MC: Platinum
2009	The Rod Stewart Sessions 1971–1998	—	—	—	—	
2011	The Best Of... The Great American Songbook	42	—	7	49	BPI: Silver
2013	Rarities	35	—	—	—	
2018	Handbags & Gladrags: The Essential	39	—	—	—	
2019	You're in My Heart: Rod Stewart with the Royal Philharmonic Orchestra	1	3	35	—	BPI: Platinum
2025	Ultimate Hits	5	72	32	—	

== Singles ==
=== 1960s–1970s ===
Year	Title	Chart positions											Certifications	Album
Year	Title	UK	AUS	CAN	GER	IRE	NLD	NZ	SWE	SWI	US	US AC	Certifications	Album
1964	"Good Morning Little Schoolgirl" / "I'm Gonna Move to the Outskirts of Town" (Decca Records)	—	—	—	—	—	—	—	—	—	—	—		Non-album single
1965	"The Day Will Come"/"Why Does It Go On" (Columbia Records)	—	—	—	—	—	—	—	—	—	—	—		Non-album single
1966	"Shake"/"I Just Got Some" (Columbia Records)	—	—	—	—	—	—	—	—	—	—	—		Non-album single
1968	"Little Miss Understood"/"So Much to Say" (Immediate Records)	—	—	—	—	—	—	—	—	—	—	—		Non-album single
1969	"Street Fighting Man"	—	—	—	—	—	—	—	—	—	—	—		An Old Raincoat Won't Ever Let You Down
1970	"It's All Over Now"	—	—	—	—	—	—	—	—	—	—	—		Gasoline Alley
1971	"Dirty Old Town"	—	—	—	—	—	—	—	—	—	—	—		An Old Raincoat Won't Ever Let You Down
1971	"Reason to Believe" b/w "Maggie May" ^{1}	1	1	24; 1	—	—	3	6	—	—	1	—	BPI: Platinum; RIAA: 2× Platinum; RMNZ: 3× Platinum	Every Picture Tells a Story
1971	"(I Know) I'm Losing You"	—	66	4	41	—	14	—	—	—	24	—		Every Picture Tells a Story
1972	"Every Picture Tells a Story" / "Reason to Believe"	—	—	—	—	—	—	—	—	—	—	—		Every Picture Tells a Story
1972	"Handbags and Gladrags"	—	69	—	—	—	—	—	—	—	42	—		An Old Raincoat Won't Ever Let You Down
1972	"You Wear It Well"	1	13	7	35	2	—	4	—	—	13	—		Never a Dull Moment
1972	"In a Broken Dream" (with Python Lee Jackson)^{2}	3	—	—	—	—	—	—	—	—	56	—		In a Broken Dream
1972	"Angel"	4	—	—	11	—	—	—	—	—	40	—		Never a Dull Moment
1972	"What's Made Milwaukee Famous (Has Made a Loser Out of Me)" ^{3}	4	71	—	11	—	—	—	—	—	—	—		Non-album single
1973	"I've Been Drinking" (with the Jeff Beck Group)	27	—	—	—	—	—	—	—	—	—	—		Non-album single
1973	"Twistin' the Night Away"	—	98	—	—	—	—	—	—	—	59	—		Never a Dull Moment
1973	"Oh! No Not My Baby"	6	57	—	—	8	—	—	—	—	59	—		Non-album single
1974	"Farewell" / "Bring It On Home to Me/You Send Me"	7	47	—	—	11	—	—	—	—	—	—		Smiler
1974	"Mine for Me"	—	—	—	—	—	—	—	—	—	91	—		Smiler
1974	"You Can Make Me Dance, Sing or Anything (Even Take the Dog for a Walk, Mend a Fuse, Fold Away the Ironing Board, or Any Other Domestic Shortcomings)" (with Faces)^{4}	12	100	—	—	—	—	—	—	—	—	—		Snakes and Ladders
1975	"Sailing" ^{5}	1	2	58	4	1	1	3	13	2	58	—	BPI: Silver; RMNZ: Gold	Atlantic Crossing
1975	"This Old Heart of Mine"	4	45	—	41	3	—	—	—	—	83	—		Atlantic Crossing
1976	"Tonight's the Night (Gonna Be Alright)"	5	3	1	26	2	5	2	7	—	1	42	RIAA: Gold; RMNZ: Gold	A Night on the Town
1976	"The Killing of Georgie (Part I and II)"	2	38	33	36	—	25	—	—	—	30	—		A Night on the Town
1976	"Get Back"	11	29	—	39	—	—	23	10	—	—	—		All This and World War II [Soundtrack]
1976	"Maggie May" (1976 release)	31	—	—	—	13	—	—	—	—	—	—		The Best of Rod Stewart
1977	"I Don't Want to Talk About It" ^{6}	1	19	51	1	4	1	2	—	—	46	44	BPI: Silver; RMNZ: Platinum	Atlantic Crossing
1977	"The First Cut Is the Deepest" ^{6}	1	—	11	1	4	1	5	—	—	21	43	BPI: Silver; RMNZ: Gold	A Night on the Town
1977	"Mandolin Wind"	—	—	—	—	—	—	—	—	—	—	—		The Best of Rod Stewart Vol. 2
1977	"You're in My Heart (The Final Acclaim)"	3	1	1	—	2	8	2	—	—	4	17	BPI: Silver; RIAA: Gold; RMNZ: Gold	Foot Loose & Fancy Free
1978	"Hot Legs"	5	42	—	4	4	8	31	—	—	28	—	BPI: Silver	Foot Loose & Fancy Free
1978	"I Was Only Joking"	5	—	15	4	4	8	35	—	—	22	31	BPI: Silver	Foot Loose & Fancy Free
1978	"Ole Ola (Mulher Brasileira)" (featuring the Scottish World Cup Football Squad '78)	4	44	—	—	—	—	—	—	—	—	—		Non-album single
1978	"Da Ya Think I'm Sexy?"	1	1	1	9	5	6	2	11	8	1	—	BPI: Gold; RIAA: Platinum; RMNZ: Platinum	Blondes Have More Fun
1979	"Ain't Love a Bitch"	11	44	14	4	5	29	—	—	—	22	—	BPI: Silver	Blondes Have More Fun
1979	"Blondes (Have More Fun)"	63	—	—	—	23	—	—	—	—	—	—		Blondes Have More Fun
"—" denotes a recording that did not chart or was not released in that territory.

=== 1980s ===
Year	Title	Chart positions												Album
Year	Title	UK	AUS	CAN	GER	IRE	NLD	NZ	SWE	SWI	US	US AC	US Rock	Album
1980	"(If Loving You Is Wrong) I Don't Want to Be Right"	23	—	—	—	—	—	—	—	—	—	—	—	Foot Loose & Fancy Free
1980	"Passion"	17	16	2	13	6	5	7	5	4	5	—	—	Foolish Behaviour
1980	"My Girl"	32	—	—	—	21	41	42	—	—	—	—	—	Foolish Behaviour
1981	"Somebody Special"	—	—	—	—	—	—	—	—	—	71	—	—	Foolish Behaviour
1981	"Oh God, I Wish I Was Home Tonight"	—	—	—	74	—	—	—	4	—	—	—	—	Foolish Behaviour
1981	"Gi' Me Wings"	—	—	—	—	—	—	—	—	—	—	—	45	Foolish Behaviour
1981	"Tonight I'm Yours (Don't Hurt Me)" b/w "Tora, Tora, Tora"	8 —	6 —	2 —	50 —	8 —	16 —	— —	10 —	9 —	20 —	— —	29; 38	Tonight I'm Yours
1981	"Young Turks"	11	3	2	30	14	1	19	—	—	5	—	23	Tonight I'm Yours
1982	"How Long" b/w "Jealous"	41 —	— —	— —	2 —	26 —	— —	— —	— —	— —	49 —	24 —	— 44	Tonight I'm Yours
1982	"Just Like a Woman"	—	—	—	—	—	—	—	—	—	—	—	—	Tonight I'm Yours
1982	"The Great Pretender" (live)	—	—	—	—	—	—	—	—	—	—	—	—	Absolutely Live
1982	"Guess I'll Always Love You" (live)	—	60	—	—	—	—	—	—	—	—	—	21	Absolutely Live
1982	"I Don't Want to Talk About It" (live) ^{6}	—	—	—	—	—	—	—	—	—	—	—	—	Absolutely Live
1983	"Baby Jane"	1	10	13	1	1	9	14	3	2	14	—	—	Body Wishes
1983	"What Am I Gonna Do (I'm So in Love with You)"	3	68	35	9	2	31	—	—	3	35	—	—	Body Wishes
1983	"Sweet Surrender"	23	—	—	42	14	—	—	—	21	—	—	—	Body Wishes
1984	"Infatuation"	27	32	15	27	12	36	—	13	16	6	—	5	Camouflage
1984	"Some Guys Have All the Luck"	15	95	16	58	11	—	—	—	—	10	—	27	Camouflage
1984	"All Right Now"	—	—	—	—	—	—	—	—	—	72	—	—	Camouflage
1984	"Trouble"	95	—	—	—	—	—	—	—	—	—	—	—	Camouflage
1985	"People Get Ready" (with Jeff Beck)	—	23	49	—	—	—	35	15	24	48	—	5	Flash (Jeff Beck)
1986	"Love Touch"	27	12	7	14	8	—	17	11	13	6	5	26	Every Beat of My Heart
1986	"Every Beat of My Heart"	2	26	95	14	2	11	32	—	11	83	—	—	Every Beat of My Heart
1986	"Another Heartache"	54	—	78	—	24	—	—	—	—	52	—	45	Every Beat of My Heart
1986	"In My Life"	80	—	—	—	—	—	—	—	—	—	—	—	Every Beat of My Heart
1987	"Twistin' the Night Away" (1987 version)	—	27	54	—	—	—	—	—	—	80	—	—	Innerspace Soundtrack
1988	"Lost in You"	21	22	6	25	14	34	—	—	30	12	—	3	Out of Order
1988	"Forever Young"	57	94	9	—	41	—	46	—	—	12	3	13	Out of Order
1988	"My Heart Can't Tell You No"	49	164	5	—	2	—	1	—	—	4	3	50	Out of Order
1989	"Crazy About Her"	—	130	12	60	4	10	3	4	1	11	—	—	Out of Order
1989	"Dynamite" (US promo)	—	—	—	—	—	—	—	—	—	—	—	16	Out of Order
1989	"This Old Heart of Mine" (with Ronald Isley)	51	94	2	51	25	49	—	—	—	10	1	—	Storyteller / The Best of Rod Stewart
1989	"Downtown Train"	10	29	1	39	13	42	30	—	—	3	1	1	Storyteller / The Best of Rod Stewart
"—" denotes a recording that did not chart or was not released in that territory.

=== 1990s ===
Year	Title	Chart positions												Certifications	Album
Year	Title	UK	AUS	CAN	GER	IRE	NLD	NZ	SWE	SWI	US	US AC	US Rock	Certifications	Album
1990	"I Don't Want to Talk About It" (re-recording) ^{6}	—	—	19	—	—	—	—	—	—	—	2	—		Storyteller
1990	"It Takes Two" (with Tina Turner)	5	16	—	22	4	3	19	11	10	—	—	—		Vagabond Heart
1991	"Rhythm of My Heart"	3	2	1	4	1	21	6	17	9	5	2	13	ARIA: Gold; RMNZ: Gold	Vagabond Heart
1991	"The Motown Song"	10	26	1	21	2	—	23	11	—	10	3	—		Vagabond Heart
1991	"Broken Arrow"	54	63	2	71	21	—	26	—	—	20	3	—		Vagabond Heart
1991	"Rebel Heart"	—	—	61	—	—	—	—	—	—	—	—	17		Vagabond Heart
1991	"You Are Everything"	—	197	56	—	—	—	—	—	—	—	—	—		Vagabond Heart
1991	"My Town" (Glass Tiger featuring Rod Stewart)	33	—	8	51	—	—	—	—	—	—	—	—		Simple Mission (Glass Tiger album)
1992	"People Get Ready" (1992 version) (with Jeff Beck)	49	—	—	—	—	—	—	—	—	—	—	—		Storyteller
1992	"Your Song"	41	—	25	—	—	60	—	—	—	48	6	—		Two Rooms (Elton John Tribute)
1992	"Broken Arrow"	41	—	—	—	—	60	—	—	—	—	—	—		Vagabond Heart
1992	"Tom Traubert's Blues (Waltzing Matilda)"	6	82	—	18	4	4	40	39	9	—	—	—		Lead Vocalist
1993	"Ruby Tuesday"	11	118	—	57	19	21	—	—	—	—	—	—		Lead Vocalist
1993	"Shotgun Wedding"	21	—	—	—	—	—	—	—	—	—	—	—		Lead Vocalist
1993	"Maggie May" (live)	—	—	—	—	—	—	—	—	—	—	—	—		Unplugged...and Seated
1993	"Have I Told You Lately" (live)	5	12	1	59	13	—	41	39	—	5	1	—	ARIA: Gold; RIAA: Gold; RMNZ: Gold	Unplugged...and Seated
1993	"Reason to Believe" (live)	51	124	3	79	—	—	—	—	—	19	2	—		Unplugged...and Seated
1993	"People Get Ready" (live)	45	—	—	—	—	—	—	—	—	—	—	—		Unplugged...and Seated
1993	"Cut Across Shorty" (live)	—	—	50	—	—	—	—	—	—	—	—	16		Unplugged...and Seated
1993	"All for Love" (with Bryan Adams and Sting)	2	1	1	1	1	3	5	1	1	1	4	—	ARIA: Platinum; RIAA: Platinum; RMNZ: Gold	The Three Musketeers Soundtrack
1993	"Having a Party" (live)	—	—	12	—	—	—	—	—	—	36	6	—		Unplugged...and Seated
1995	"You're the Star"	19	—	—	53	—	—	42	—	30	—	—	—		A Spanner in the Works
1995	"Leave Virginia Alone"	—	53	1	—	—	—	—	—	—	52	10	—		A Spanner in the Works
1995	"Lady Luck"	56	—	—	65	—	—	—	—	—	—	—	—		A Spanner in the Works
1995	"This"	—	—	5	—	—	—	—	—	—	119	33	—		A Spanner in the Works
1996	"So Far Away"	—	—	8	74	—	—	—	—	—	—	2	—		Tapestry Revisited: A Tribute to Carole King
1996	"Purple Heather" (with the Scottish Euro '96 Squad)	16	—	—	—	—	—	—	—	—	—	—	—		A Spanner in the Works
1996	"If We Fall in Love Tonight"	58	113	32	70	—	—	—	—	—	54	4	—		If We Fall in Love Tonight
1997	"When I Need You"	—	—	55	—	—	—	—	—	—	—	—	—		If We Fall in Love Tonight
1997	"Da Ya Think I'm Sexy?" (N-Trance featuring Rod Stewart)	7	3	—	15	10	23	1	15	21	—	—	—	ARIA: 2× Platinum	Happy Hour
1998	"Ooh La La"	16	159	29	73	—	92	—	—	—	39	3	—		When We Were the New Boys
1998	"Cigarettes and Alcohol"	—	—	—	—	—	—	—	—	—	—	—	13		When We Were the New Boys
1998	"Rocks"	55	—	—	—	—	—	—	—	—	—	—	31		When We Were the New Boys
1998	"When We Were the New Boys"	—	—	—	75	—	—	—	—	—	—	—	—		When We Were the New Boys
1998	"Superstar"	—	—	—	—	—	—	—	—	—	—	—	—		When We Were the New Boys
1999	"Faith of the Heart"	60	174	27	—	—	99	—	—	—	117	3	—		Patch Adams Soundtrack
"—" denotes a recording that did not chart or was not released in that territory.

=== 2000s ===
Year	Title	Chart positions						Album
Year	Title	UK	AUS	GER	NLD	NZ	US AC	Album
2000	"Run Back into Your Arms"	—	—	74	—	—	—	Human
2001	"I Can't Deny It"	26	89	—	90	36	18	Human
2001	"Don't Come Around Here" (with Helicopter Girl)	79	185	—	—	—	30	Human
2002	"These Foolish Things"	—	—	—	—	—	13	It Had to Be You: The Great American Songbook
2003	"They Can't Take That Away from Me"	—	—	—	—	—	27	It Had to Be You: The Great American Songbook
2003	"Bewitched, Bothered & Bewildered" (with Cher)	—	—	—	—	—	17	As Time Goes By: The Great American Songbook Volume II
2003	"I Only Have Eyes for You" (with Ana Belén)	—	—	—	—	—	—	As Time Goes By: The Great American Songbook Volume II
2004	"Time After Time"	—	—	—	—	—	21	As Time Goes By: The Great American Songbook Volume II
2004	"Smile"	—	—	—	—	—	—	As Time Goes By: The Great American Songbook Volume II
2004	"What a Wonderful World" (featuring Stevie Wonder)	—	—	—	85	—	13	Stardust: The Great American Songbook Volume III
2004	"Baby, It's Cold Outside" (with Dolly Parton)	—	—	—	—	—	2	Stardust: The Great American Songbook Volume III
2005	"Blue Moon" (featuring Eric Clapton)	—	—	—	—	—	23	Stardust: The Great American Songbook Volume III
2005	"I've Got a Crush on You" (with Diana Ross)	—	—	—	—	—	19	Thanks for the Memory: The Great American Songbook Volume IV
2005	"I've Got My Love to Keep Me Warm"	—	—	—	—	—	22	Thanks for the Memory: The Great American Songbook Volume IV
2006	"Have You Ever Seen the Rain?"	—	—	—	—	—	6	Still the Same... Great Rock Classics of Our Time
2007	"Fooled Around and Fell in Love"	—	—	—	—	—	13	Still the Same... Great Rock Classics of Our Time
2007	"It's a Heartache"	—	—	—	—	—	—	Still the Same... Great Rock Classics of Our Time
2009	"It's the Same Old Song"	—	—	—	—	—	—	Soulbook
"—" denotes a recording that did not chart or was not released in that territory.

=== 2010s ===
Year	Title	Chart positions						Certifications	Album
Year	Title	UK	AUS	GER	NZ	US	US AC	Certifications	Album
2010	"My Cherie Amour" (featuring Stevie Wonder)	—	—	—	—	—	—		Soulbook
2010	"Everybody Hurts" (as part of Helping Haiti)	1	28	16	17	—	—		Charity single
2010	"I've Got You Under My Skin"	—	—	—	—	—	—		Fly Me to the Moon... The Great American Songbook Volume V
2010	"Beyond the Sea"	—	—	—	—	—	—		Fly Me to the Moon... The Great American Songbook Volume V
2012	"Let It Snow! Let It Snow! Let It Snow!"	—	—	—	—	—	1		Merry Christmas, Baby
2012	"Merry Christmas, Baby" (with Cee Lo Green and Trombone Shorty)	111	—	—	—	—	18		Merry Christmas, Baby
2012	"Winter Wonderland" (with Michael Bublé)	—	—	—	—	—	26		Merry Christmas, Baby
2012	"We Three Kings" (with Mary J. Blige)	—	—	—	—	—	—		Merry Christmas, Baby
2012	"Have Yourself a Merry Little Christmas"	51	—	—	—	—	28		Merry Christmas, Baby
2013	"She Makes Me Happy"	—	—	—	—	—	12		Time
2013	"It's Over"	91	—	—	—	—	—		Time
2013	"Brighton Beach"	—	—	—	—	—	—		Time
2013	"Can't Stop Me Now"	199	—	—	—	—	22		Time
2013	"Forever Young" ^{7}	55	—	—	—	—	—		Time (special edition)
2014	"Beautiful Morning"	—	—	—	—	—	—		Time
2015	"Everyday" (with ASAP Rocky, Miguel and Mark Ronson)	56	49	—	—	92	—	BPI: Platinum; RMNZ: 3× Platinum	At. Long. Last. ASAP
2015	"Love Is"	—	—	—	—	—	37		Another Country
2015	"Please"	—	—	—	—	—	—		Another Country
2017	"Da Ya Think I'm Sexy?" (featuring DNCE)	—	—	—	—	—	11		Non-album single
2018	"Didn't I" (featuring Bridget Cady)	—	—	—	—	—	10		Blood Red Roses
2018	"Look in Her Eyes"	—	—	—	—	—	—		Blood Red Roses
"—" denotes a recording that did not chart or was not released in that territory.

=== 2020s ===
Year	Title	Chart positions	Album
Year	Title	US AC	Album
2021	"One More Time"	19	The Tears of Hercules
2021	"Hold On"	—	The Tears of Hercules
2021	"I Can't Imagine"	—	The Tears of Hercules
"—" denotes a recording that did not chart or was not released in that territory.

Notes

^{1} Although "Reason to Believe" was the A-side, the single was listed on the UK chart as "Maggie May/Reason to Believe".
^{2} "In a Broken Dream" was credited to Python Lee Jackson and released as a single in late 1969. However, the single did not chart in the UK until 1972.
^{3} "What's Made Milwaukee Famous (Has Made a Loser Out of Me)" was released as a double A-side with "Angel" in the UK and Ireland.
^{4} "You Can Make Me Dance..." was credited to Rod Stewart/Faces, at least in the UK.
^{5} "Sailing" was in 1976 used as the theme music for the BBC documentary series Sailor, about HMS Ark Royal, and when it was subsequently re-released it reached number 3 on the UK Singles Chart. In 1987, the song made a new chart appearance in the UK when re-released as a charity single after the Zeebrugge ferry disaster, reaching number 41 on the chart. The 1987 release also made number 30 in Ireland.
^{6} "The First Cut Is the Deepest" and "I Don't Want to Talk About It" were released as a double A-side in the UK in 1977. Internationally, the former was released in 1977 and the latter in 1979. However, a newly recorded version of "I Don't Want to Talk About It", included on the Stewart anthology Storyteller, was a number 2 hit on the Billboard Adult Contemporary chart in 1990; it did not chart on the Billboard Hot 100 as it was not available as a retail single.
^{7} Also included on previous albums.

== Other appearances ==
Year	Title	Album
1968	"You Can't Do That"	backing vocals on single by Andy Ellison
1969	"In a Broken Dream"	with Python Lee Jackson
1969	"Doin' Fine (Cloud Nine)"	with Python Lee Jackson
1969	"The Blues"	with Python Lee Jackson
1972	"Mother Ain't Dead"	'B' side of Long John Baldry's single "Iko Iko" (Warner Bros K16175) & album Everything Stops for Tea (Warner Bros K 46160)
1974	"Mystifies Me" "Take a Look at the Guy" "If You Gotta Make a Fool of Somebody"	I've Got My Own Album to Do by Ron Wood
1982	"That's What Friends Are For"	from the film Night Shift soundtrack
1991	"Your Song"	Two Rooms: Celebrating the Songs of Elton John & Bernie Taupin
1994	"Don't Break Your Promise (Too Soon)" (with Bobby Womack)	Resurrection
1994	"People Get Ready"	A Tribute to Curtis Mayfield
1994	"Gasoline Alley"	The Unplugged Collection, Volume One
1995	"So Far Away"	Tapestry Revisited: A Tribute to Carole King
2006	"What's Made Milwaukee Famous (Has Made a Loser Out of Me)"	Last Man Standing by Jerry Lee Lewis
2008	"What the World Needs Now" (with Steve Tyrell, Burt Bacharach, Martina McBride, James Taylor and Dionne Warwick)	Back to Bacharach
2013	"Nobody Knows You When You're Down and Out"	Confidencias by Alejandro Fernández
2016	"Kiss Her for Me" (with Frankie Miller and Joe Walsh)	Frankie Miller's Double Take
2019	"Battle of the Sexes" (with Bonnie Tyler)	Between the Earth and the Stars
2019	"Fairytales" (with Robbie Williams)	The Christmas Present

== Video releases ==
Year	Title	Certifications
1981	Tonight He's Yours: Live at the Forum	
1984	The Rod Stewart Concert Video	
1988	Video Biography 1969-1974 (with The Faces)	
1990	The Videos 1984-1991	
1991	Storyteller	ARIA: Platinum
1992	Vagabond Heart Tour	
1995	The Final Concert With Keith Richards (with The Faces)	
2002	Special Edition EP	
2003	It Had to Be You: The Great American Songbook	BPI: Platinum; ARIA: 8× Platinum; MC: 3× Platinum; RIAA: Platinum
2003	The Best of Rod Stewart & The Faces, The Early Years (with The Faces)	ARIA: Platinum
2004	VH1: Storytellers	ARIA: Gold
2004	One Night Only! Rod Stewart Live at Royal Albert Hall	ARIA: 10× Platinum; BPI: 2× Platinum
2005	Love Touch.	

== Music videos ==
Year	Song	Director(s)	Album of Origin
1973	"Oh! No Not My Baby"		N/A
1974	"Farewell"		Smiler
1974	"Bring It On Home to Me/You Send Me"		Smiler
1975	"Sailing"	Bruce Gowers	Atlantic Crossing
1976	"Tonight's the Night (Gonna Be Alright)"	Bruce Gowers	A Night on the Town
1976	"The First Cut Is the Deepest"	Bruce Gowers	A Night on the Town
1976	"The Killing of Georgie (Part I and II)"	Bruce Gowers	A Night on the Town
1977	"You're In My Heart (The Final Acclaim)"	Bruce Gowers	Foot Loose & Fancy Free
1977	"Hot Legs"	Bruce Gowers	Foot Loose & Fancy Free
1977	"I Was Only Joking"	Bruce Gowers	Foot Loose & Fancy Free
1977	"You're Insane"	Bruce Gowers	Foot Loose & Fancy Free
1978	"Da Ya Think I'm Sexy?"	Bruce Gowers	Blondes Have More Fun
1978	"Ain't Love a Bitch"	Bruce Gowers	Blondes Have More Fun
1978	"Blondes (Have More Fun)"	Bruce Gowers	Blondes Have More Fun
1980	"Passion"	Mike Mansfield	Foolish Behaviour
1980	"She Won't Dance with Me"	Mike Mansfield	Foolish Behaviour
1980	"Oh God, I Wish I Was Home Tonight"	Mike Mansfield	Foolish Behaviour
1981	"Tonight I'm Yours (Don't Hurt Me)"	Russell Mulcahy	Tonight I'm Yours
1981	"Young Turks"	Russell Mulcahy	Tonight I'm Yours
1981	"How Long"		Tonight I'm Yours
1981	"Just Like a Woman"		Tonight I'm Yours
1983	"Baby Jane"	Steve Barron	Body Wishes
1983	"What Am I Gonna Do (I'm So in Love With You)"	Brian Grant	Body Wishes
1984	"Infatuation" 2 different versions	Jonathan Kaplan	Camouflage
1984	"Some Guys Have All the Luck" 2 different versions	Jerry Kramer & Wayne Isham	Camouflage
1985	"People Get Ready" with Jeff Beck	D. J. Webster	Flash (Jeff Beck album)
1986	"Love Touch"	Mary Lambert	Every Beat of My Heart
1986	"Every Beat of My Heart"	Leslie Libman	Every Beat of My Heart
1986	"Another Heartache"	Leslie Libman	Every Beat of My Heart
1987	"Twistin' the Night Away" 1987 version		Innerspace Soundtrack
1988	"Lost in You" 2 different versions	Jonathan Kaplan	Out of Order
1988	"Forever Young"	Eric Watson	Out of Order
1988	"My Heart Can't Tell You No"	Russell Mulcahy	Out of Order
1989	"Crazy About Her"		Out of Order
1989	"This Old Heart of Mine" 1989 version with Ronald Isley	David Hogan	The Best of Rod Stewart
1989	"Downtown Train"	Amy Goldstein	The Best of Rod Stewart
1990	"It Takes Two" with Tina Turner	David Hogan	Vagabond Heart
1991	"Rhythm of My Heart" 2 different versions	Caleb Deschanel	Vagabond Heart
1991	"The Motown Song" 2 different versions	Derek Hayes	Vagabond Heart
1991	"Broken Arrow"	Peter Nydrle	Vagabond Heart
1992	"Tom Traubert's Blues (Waltzing Matilda)"	Carolyn Mayer	Lead Vocalist
1992	"Shotgun Wedding"	Scott Kalvert	Lead Vocalist
1993	"Ruby Tuesday"		Lead Vocalist
1994	"All for Love" with Bryan Adams and Sting	David Hogan	The Three Musketeers Soundtrack
1995	"You're the Star"		A Spanner in the Works
1995	"Leave Virginia Alone"	Zack Snyder	A Spanner in the Works
1995	"Lady Luck"		A Spanner in the Works
1995	"This"	Amy Goldstein	A Spanner in the Works
1995	"So Far Away"	David Hogan	Tapestry Revisited: A Tribute to Carole King
1996	"Purple Heather" with The Scottish Euro '96 Squad		A Spanner in the Works
1996	"If We Fall in Love Tonight"	Rocky Schenck	If We Fall in Love Tonight
1996	"When I Need You"	Tom Barnes	If We Fall in Love Tonight
1998	"Ooh La La"	Randee St. Nicholas	When We Were the New Boys
2000	"Run Back into Your Arms"	Kevin Godley	Human
2001	"I Can't Deny It"	Nick Egan	Human
2001	"Don't Come Around Here" with Helicopter Girl	David Hogan	Human
2002	"These Foolish Things"	Elizabeth Bailey	It Had to Be You... The Great American Songbook
2003	"Time After Time"	Elizabeth Bailey	As Time Goes By... The Great American Songbook Vol. II
2005	"Blue Skies"	David Mallet	Thanks for the Memory... The Great American Songbook Vol. IV
2006	"Have You Ever Seen the Rain"	Nigel Dick	Still the Same... Great Rock Classics of Our Time
2006	"Fooled Around and Fell in Love"	Nigel Dick	Still the Same... Great Rock Classics of Our Time
2010	"That Old Black Magic"		Fly Me to the Moon... The Great American Songbook Vol. V
2013	"She Makes Me Happy"	Cameron Duddy	Time
2013	"It's Over"	Cameron Duddy	Time
2013	"Brighton Beach"	Zach Merck	Time
2015	"Love Is"		Another Country
2015	"Please"	Natalie Johns	Another Country
2015	"Way Back Home"	Natalie Johns	Another Country
2021	"One More Time"		The Tears of Hercules
2021	"I Can't Imagine"		The Tears of Hercules
2023	"Almost Like Being in Love"		Swing Fever
2024	"Pennies from Heaven"	Jeremy Deller	Swing Fever

=== Cameos and other appearances ===
Year	Song	Credited Artist	Director
2005	"Tears in Heaven"	Tsunami Relief	Marcus Raboy
2010	"Everybody Hurts"	Helping Haiti	Joseph Kahn
2015	"Everyday"	ASAP Rocky featuring Rod Stewart, Miguel and Mark Ronson	Emmanuel Cossu and Fleur & Manu

== See also ==
=== With The Jeff Beck Group ===
- Truth (1968)
- Beck-Ola (1969)

=== With Faces ===
- First Step (1970)
- Long Player (1971)
- A Nod Is As Good As a Wink... to a Blind Horse (1971)
- Ooh La La (1973)
