= Storyteller – The Complete Anthology: 1964–1990 =

Compilation album by Rod Stewart
- Released: November 1989
- Recorded: 1964–1989
- Genres: Rock, pop, rock and roll
- Length: 291:54
- Label: Warner Bros.

Rod Stewart chronology
The Best of Rod Stewart (1989)	Storyteller – The Complete Anthology: 1964–1990 (1989)	Downtown Train – Selections from the Storyteller Anthology (1990)

Professional ratings
Review scores
Source	Rating
AllMusic	4.5/5 stars
Rolling Stone	4/5 stars

Storyteller – The Complete Anthology: 1964–1990, often referred to as The Storyteller Anthology or simply Storyteller is a 4-disc compilation released by Rod Stewart in 1989 by Warner Bros. Records and contains 65 tracks, five of which had never before been released.

== Background ==
Storyteller spans the whole of Stewart’s career beginning with the 1964 release of "Good Morning Little Schoolgirl" and ending with "Downtown Train", a new song for 1989. It was designed for release in the US and contains four discs each covering a different period somewhat chronologically. Disc one spans 1964–1971 and includes "Can I Get a Witness?" recorded while Stewart was with Steampacket and which had never before been released. Disc two spans 1971–1974. Disc three spans 1975–1981 and includes "To Love Somebody" featuring Booker T. & the M.G.'s. In the liner notes Rod recalls that this version was recorded shortly before Al Jackson, Jr. was killed. Disc four spans 1981–1989 and includes never before released versions of "I Don't Want to Talk About It" and "This Old Heart of Mine". Originally released in an LP-sized box package, it was re-released on 17 November 2009 in a more compact boxed configuration.

== Track listing ==
Disc one
No.	Title	Writer(s)	Original appearance	Length
1.	"Good Morning Little Schoolgirl" (blues standard cover)	Sonny Boy Williamson I	1964 – Non-album single	2:06
2.	"Can I Get a Witness" (Marvin Gaye cover)	Holland-Dozier-Holland	1977 – Rod Stewart & Steampacket	3:34
3.	"Shake" (Sam Cooke cover)	Sam Cooke	1966 – Non-album single	2:48
4.	"So Much to Say"	Rod Stewart	1968 – B-side to non-album single	3:13
5.	"Little Miss Understood"	Stewart	1968 – Non-album single	3:37
6.	"I've Been Drinking"	Stewart, Jeff Beck	1968 – B-side to non-album single	3:17
7.	"I Ain't Superstitious" (Howlin' Wolf cover)	Willie Dixon	1968 – Truth	4:53
8.	"Shapes of Things" (The Yardbirds cover)	Jim McCarty, Keith Relf, Paul Samwell-Smith	1968 – Truth	3:18
9.	"In a Broken Dream"	Dave Bentley	1972 – In a Broken Dream	3:39
10.	"Street Fighting Man" (Rolling Stones cover)	Keith Richards, Mick Jagger	1969 – An Old Raincoat Won't Ever Let You Down	5:05
11.	"Handbags and Gladrags" (Mike d'Abo cover)	Mike d'Abo	1969 – An Old Raincoat Won't Ever Let You Down	4:23
12.	"Gasoline Alley"	Stewart, Ronald Wood	1970 – Gasoline Alley	4:02
13.	"Cut Across Shorty" (Eddie Cochran cover)	Marijohn Wilkin, Wayne P. Walker	1970 – Gasoline Alley	6:31
14.	"Country Comfort" (Elton John cover)	Elton John, Bernie Taupin	1970 – Gasoline Alley	4:43
15.	"It's All Over Now" (The Valentinos cover)	Bobby Womack, Shirley Womack	1970 – Gasoline Alley	6:22
16.	"Sweet Lady Mary" (with Faces)	Stewart, Wood, Ronald Lane	1971 – Long Player	5:48
17.	"Had Me a Real Good Time" (with Faces)	Stewart, Wood, Lane	1971 – Long Player	5:54

Disc two
No.	Title	Writer(s)	Original appearance	Length
1.	"Maggie May"	Stewart, Martin Quittenton	1971 – Every Picture Tells a Story	5:45
2.	"Mandolin Wind"	Stewart	1971 – Every Picture Tells a Story	5:30
3.	"(I Know) I'm Losing You" (The Temptations cover)	Cornelius Grant, Eddie Holland, Norman Whitfield	1971 – Every Picture Tells a Story	5:22
4.	"Reason to Believe" (Tim Hardin cover)	Tim Hardin	1971 – Every Picture Tells a Story	4:07
5.	"Every Picture Tells a Story"	Stewart, Wood	1971 – Every Picture Tells a Story	5:58
6.	"Stay with Me" (with Faces)	Stewart, Wood	1971 – A Nod Is as Good as a Wink...To a Blind Horse	4:37
7.	"True Blue"	Stewart, Wood	1972 – Never a Dull Moment	3:33
8.	"Angel" (Jimi Hendrix cover)	Jimi Hendrix	1972 – Never a Dull Moment	4:04
9.	"You Wear It Well"	Stewart, Quittenton	1972 – Never a Dull Moment	4:20
10.	"I'd Rather Go Blind" (Etta James cover)	Ellington Jordan, Etta James, Billy Foster	1972 – Never a Dull Moment	3:53
11.	"Twistin' the Night Away" (Sam Cooke cover)	Cooke	1972 – Never a Dull Moment	3:14
12.	"What's Made Milwaukee Famous (Has Made a Loser Out of Me)" (Jerry Lee Lewis cover)	Glenn Sutton	1972 – Double A-side with Angel	2:52
13.	"Oh No Not My Baby" (Maxine Brown cover with Faces members Wood, Kenney Jones, Ian McLagan)	Gerry Goffin, Carole King	1973 – Non-album single	3:38
14.	"Pinball Wizard" (The Who cover)	Pete Townshend	1972 – Tommy	3:40
15.	"Sweet Little Rock 'N Roller" (Chuck Berry cover)	Chuck Berry	1974 – Smiler	3:46
16.	"Let Me Be Your Car" (Elton John cover)	John, Taupin	1974 – Smiler	4:58
17.	"You Can Make Me Dance, Sing or Anything (Even Take the Dog for a Walk, Mend a Fuse, Fold Away the Ironing Board, or Any Other Domestic Shortcomings)" (with Faces)	Stewart, Wood, McLagan, Jones, Tetsu Yamauchi	1974 – Non-album single	4:23

Disc three
No.	Title	Writer(s)	Original appearance	Length
1.	"Sailing" (Sutherland Brothers cover)	Gavin Sutherland	1975 – Atlantic Crossing	4:38
2.	"I Don't Want to Talk About It" (Crazy Horse cover)	Danny Whitten	1975 – Atlantic Crossing	4:49
3.	"Stone Cold Sober"	Stewart, Steve Cropper	1975 – Atlantic Crossing	4:12
4.	"To Love Somebody" (Bee Gees cover with Booker T. & the M.G.'s)	Barry Gibb, Robin Gibb	1975 – Atlantic Crossing	4:30
5.	"Tonight's the Night (Gonna Be Alright)"	Stewart	1976 – A Night on the Town	3:54
6.	"The First Cut Is the Deepest" (Cat Stevens cover)	Cat Stevens	1976 – A Night on the Town	4:26
7.	"The Killing of Georgie (Part I and II)"	Stewart	1976 – A Night on the Town	6:31
8.	"Get Back" (The Beatles cover)	Paul McCartney, John Lennon	1976 – All This and World War II	4:24
9.	"Hot Legs"	Stewart, Gary Grainger	1977 – Foot Loose & Fancy Free	5:11
10.	"I Was Only Joking"	Stewart, Grainger	1977 – Foot Loose & Fancy Free	6:02
11.	"You're in My Heart (The Final Acclaim)"	Stewart	1977 – Foot Loose & Fancy Free	4:28
12.	"Da Ya Think I'm Sexy?"	Stewart, Carmine Appice, Duane Hitchings	1978 – Blondes Have More Fun	5:28
13.	"Passion"	Stewart, Grainger, Phil Chen, Jim Cregan, Kevin Savigar	1980 – Foolish Behaviour	5:30
14.	"Oh God, I Wish I Was Home Tonight"	Stewart, Grainger, Chen, Cregan, Savigar	1980 – Foolish Behaviour	5:01
15.	"Tonight I'm Yours (Don't Hurt Me)"	Stewart, Cregan, Savigar	1981 – Tonight I'm Yours	4:10

Disc four
No.	Title	Writer(s)	Original appearance	Length
1.	"Young Turks"	Stewart, Appice, Hitchings, Savigar	1981 – Tonight I'm Yours	5:01
2.	"Baby Jane"	Stewart, Jay Davis	1982 – Body Wishes	4:43
3.	"What Am I Gonna Do (I'm So in Love with You)"	Stewart, Davis, Tony Brock	1982 – Body Wishes	4:17
4.	"People Get Ready" (The Impressions cover, with Jeff Beck)	Curtis Mayfield	1985 – Flash	4:52
5.	"Some Guys Have All the Luck" (The Persuaders cover)	Jeff Fortgang	1984 – Camouflage	4:32
6.	"Infatuation"	Stewart, Hitchings, Rowland Robinson	1984 – Camouflage	5:12
7.	"Love Touch"	Michael Chapman, Holly Knight	1986 – Every Beat of My Heart	4:03
8.	"Every Beat of My Heart"	Stewart, Savigar	1986 – Every Beat of My Heart	5:18
9.	"Lost in You"	Stewart, Andy Taylor	1988 – Out of Order	4:57
10.	"My Heart Can't Tell You No"	Simon Climie, Dennis Morgan	1988 – Out of Order	5:11
11.	"Dynamite"	Stewart, Taylor	1988 – Out of Order	4:15
12.	"Crazy About Her"	Stewart, Cregan, Hitchings	1988 – Out of Order	4:54
13.	"Forever Young"	Stewart, Cregan, Savigar, Dylan	1988 – Out of Order	4:03
14.	"I Don't Want to Talk About It" (Crazy Horse cover)	Whitten	1989 re-recording	4:52
15.	"This Old Heart of Mine" (The Isley Brothers cover, duet with Ronald Isley)	Holland–Dozier–Holland	1989 re-recording	4:12
16.	"Downtown Train" (Tom Waits cover)	Tom Waits	New release	4:39

== Production ==
- "Can I Get a Witness?" produced by Giorgio Gomelsky
- "To Love Somebody" produced by Tom Dowd
- "I Don't Want to Talk About It" produced by Rod Stewart and Bernard Edwards
- "This Old Heart of Mine (Is Weak for You)" produced by Bernard Edwards and Trevor Horn
- "Downtown Train" produced by Trevor Horn
- Compiled and Coordinated by Gregg Geller
- A&R Compilation Executive: Michael Ostin
- Management: Arnold Stiefel and Randy Phillips

== Charts ==
=== Weekly charts ===
Chart (1990)	Peak position
Canada Top Albums/CDs (RPM)	21
US Billboard 200	54

Chart (2011–2012)	Peak position
Australian Albums Chart	5
Irish Albums Chart	32
New Zealand Albums Chart	1

Chart (2015)	Peak position
UK Albums Chart	23

=== Year-end charts ===
Chart (2012)	Position
Australian Albums Chart	93

== Certifications ==
Region	Certification	Certified units/sales
Australia (ARIA)	Gold	35,000^{^}
Canada (Music Canada)	Gold	50,000^{^}
France (SNEP)	Platinum	300,000^{*}
New Zealand (RMNZ)	Gold	7,500^{^}
United Kingdom (BPI)	Gold	100,000^{^}
United States (RIAA)	2× Platinum	500,000^{^}
^{*} Sales figures based on certification alone.^{^} Shipments figures based on certification alone.

== Downtown Train – Selections from the Storyteller Anthology ==
Downtown Train

Compilation album by Rod Stewart
- Released: March 1990
- Genres: Rock, pop
- Length: 58:41
- Label: Warner Bros.

Rod Stewart chronology
Storyteller (1989)	Downtown Train (1990)	Vagabond Heart (1991)

Professional ratings
Review scores
Source	Rating
AllMusic	3/5 stars
The Rolling Stone Album Guide	3/5 stars

Downtown Train is a compilation album by Rod Stewart released in March 1990 only in the United States by Warner Bros. Records.

The album is made up of twelve tracks from the previously released Storyteller Anthology. The album is skewed toward the more recent period of Stewart's career, most of the songs dating after 1980. Included, however, is Stay with Me, a contemporary sounding song from 1971. This is also the only song on Downtown Train that is not from his solo catalog, though Storyteller includes ten. In the US, Downtown Train would peak at #20 and in 1995, it would be double platinum.

=== Track listing ===
- All songs previously released on Storyteller - The Complete Anthology: 1964–1990
1. "Stay With Me" (Rod Stewart, Ron Wood) – 4:38
2. "Tonight's the Night (Gonna Be Alright)" (Stewart) – 3:56
3. "The Killing of Georgie (Part I and II)" (Stewart) – 6:27
4. "Passion" (Phil Chen, Jim Cregan, Gary Grainger, Kevin Savigar, Stewart) – 5:32
5. "Young Turks" (Carmine Appice, Duane Hitchings, Savigar, Stewart) – 5:02
6. "Infatuation" (Hitchings, Rowland Robinson, Stewart) – 5:13
7. "People Get Ready" (Curtis Mayfield) – 4:53
8. "Forever Young" (Cregan, Savigar, Bob Dylan, Stewart) – 4:04
9. "My Heart Can't Tell You No" (Simon Climie, Dennis Morgan) – 5:13
10. "I Don't Want to Talk About It" (Danny Whitten) – 4:53
11. "This Old Heart of Mine (Is Weak for You)" (Lamont Dozier, Edward Holland, Jr., Brian Holland, Sylvia Moy) – 4:11
12. "Downtown Train" (Tom Waits) – 4:39

=== Charts ===
==== Weekly charts ====
Chart (1990)	Peak position
Canada Top Albums/CDs (RPM)	3
US Billboard 200	20

==== Year-end charts ====
Chart (1990)	Position
Canada Top Albums/CDs (RPM)	15
US Billboard 200	81

==== Certifications ====
Certification	Date
Gold	15 May 1990
Platinum	9 December 1991
Double Platinum	9 February 1995
