= The Story So Far: The Very Best of Rod Stewart =

2001 compilation album by Rod Stewart

Greatest hits album by Rod Stewart
- Released: 12 November 2001
- Recorded: 1969–2000
- Genre: Rock
- Length: 155:11
- Label: FMR; Warner Bros.
- Producer: Rod Stewart, Patrick Leonard, Trevor Horn, Bernard Edwards, Michael Omartian, Tom Dowd, Andy Taylor

Rod Stewart chronology
Human (2001)	The Story So Far: The Very Best of Rod Stewart (2001)	It Had to Be You: The Great American Songbook (2002)

The Voice: The Very Best of Rod Stewart

Encore: The Very Best of Rod Stewart, Vol. 2

Professional ratings
Review scores
Source	Rating
AllMusic	4/5 stars
AllMusic	3/5 stars

The Story So Far: The Very Best of Rod Stewart is a career-retrospective compilation album by Rod Stewart, released in 2001. The album summarises his solo work beginning with material from his 1971 breakthrough album Every Picture Tells a Story until his 2001 album Human. For contractual reasons, only two songs from his Mercury Records tenure ("Maggie May" and "You Wear It Well") were included (a third song from the Mercury era, "Reason to Believe", was included in a live acoustic version from the Warner Bros. album Unplugged...and Seated). The rest of the material is from different albums released under Warner Bros. Records.

The compilation was particularly notable for dividing the songs between rock and pop tunes on the first disc (A Night Out) and love songs on the second disc (A Night In). Also, even though most of the songs included on the album enjoyed big success (29 out of the 34 songs originally reached the Top 10 in the United Kingdom and/or the United States), many hit singles were missed-out, including US Top 10 hits as "Passion", "Infatuation", "Handbags and Gladrags" and "My Heart Can't Tell You No".

In the United States the album was released separately as The Voice: The Very Best of Rod Stewart and Encore: The Very Best of Rod Stewart Vol. 2, though there are some differences in the content. Warner Bros. Records released The Story So Far on 12 November 2001 and the next day, The Voice was released. On 26 August 2003, Encore was released.

== Track listing ==
=== The Story So Far ===
Disc one: A Night Out
No.	Title	Writer(s)	From album	Length
1.	"Maggie May" (includes the interlude "Link Music - Henry's Time" from the original album appearance)	Rod Stewart	Every Picture Tells a Story	5:46
2.	"Baby Jane"	Stewart, Jay Davis	Body Wishes	4:43
3.	"Some Guys Have All the Luck"	Jeff Fortgang	Camouflage	4:33
4.	"Young Turks"	Stewart, Carmine Appice, Duane Hitchings, Kevin Savigar	Tonight I'm Yours	5:04
5.	"Da Ya Think I'm Sexy?"	Stewart, Appice, Hitchings	Blondes Have More Fun	5:31
6.	"What Am I Gonna Do (I'm So in Love With You)"	Stewart, Davis, Tony Brock	Body Wishes	4:19
7.	"Hot Legs"	Stewart	Foot Loose & Fancy Free	5:15
8.	"You Wear It Well" (includes the instrumental "Interludings" from the original album appearance)	Stewart, Martin Quittenton	Never a Dull Moment	5:01
9.	"Rhythm of My Heart"	Marc Jordan, John Capek	Vagabond Heart	4:13
10.	"Downtown Train"	Tom Waits	Storyteller	4:39
11.	"The Motown Song" (single mix)	Larry John McNally	Vagabond Heart	3:58
12.	"This Old Heart of Mine (Is Weak for You)" (with Ronald Isley)	Holland–Dozier–Holland, Sylvia Moy	Storyteller	4:11
13.	"Tonight I'm Yours (Don't Hurt Me)"	Stewart, Jim Cregan, Savigar	Tonight I'm Yours	4:12
14.	"Ooh La La" (originally a Faces song with lead vocals by Ronnie Wood from Ooh La La)	Ronnie Lane, Ronnie Wood	When We Were the New Boys	4:15
15.	"I Can't Deny It"	Gregg Alexander, Rick Nowels	Human	3:44
16.	"It Takes Two" (with Tina Turner)	William "Mickey" Stevenson, Moy	Vagabond Heart	4:12
17.	"Stay with Me" (with Faces)	Stewart, Wood	A Nod Is As Good As a Wink... to a Blind Horse	4:37
Total length:				78:22

Disc two: A Night In
No.	Title	Writer(s)	From album	Length
1.	"Sailing"	Gavin Sutherland	Atlantic Crossing	4:38
2.	"I Don't Want to Talk About It"	Danny Whitten	Atlantic Crossing	4:49
3.	"Have I Told You Lately"	Van Morrison	Vagabond Heart	3:59
4.	"The First Cut Is the Deepest"	Cat Stevens	A Night on the Town	4:31
5.	"You're in My Heart (The Final Acclaim)"	Stewart	Foot Loose & Fancy Free	4:30
6.	"All for Love" (with Bryan Adams and Sting)	Bryan Adams, Robert John "Mutt" Lange, Michael Kamen	The Three Musketeers soundtrack	4:42
7.	"Tonight's the Night (Gonna Be Alright)"	Stewart	A Night on the Town	3:56
8.	"Every Beat of My Heart"	Stewart, Savigar	Every Beat of My Heart	5:21
9.	"Tom Traubert's Blues (Waltzing Matilda)"	Waits	Lead Vocalist	6:12
10.	"Don't Come Around Here" (with Helicopter Girl)	Jackie Joyce, Paul Berry, Mark Taylor, Kenny Thomas	Human	3:50
11.	"The Killing of Georgie (Part I and II)"	Stewart	A Night on the Town	6:29
12.	"Love Touch"	Holly Knight, Mike Chapman	Every Beat of My Heart	4:03
13.	"I Was Only Joking"	Stewart, Gary Grainger	Foot Loose & Fancy Free	6:07
14.	"Ruby Tuesday"	Mick Jagger, Keith Richards	Lead Vocalist	4:05
15.	"In a Broken Dream" (with Python Lee Jackson)	David Keith Bentley	single, collected on Storyteller	3:40
16.	"Reason to Believe" (live acoustic version of the song from Every Picture Tells a Story featuring Ronnie Wood)	Tim Hardin	Unplugged...and Seated	3:53
17.	"In My Life"	John Lennon, Paul McCartney	Every Beat of My Heart	1:58
Total length:				76:50

=== US version ===
Disc one: The Voice
No.	Title	Writer(s)	From album	Length
1.	"Rhythm of My Heart"	Marc Jordan, John Capek	Vagabond Heart	4:14
2.	"Maggie May"	Rod Stewart, Martin Quittenton	Every Picture Tells a Story	5:46
3.	"Have I Told You Lately" (Live)	Van Morrison	Unplugged...and Seated	4:04
4.	"This Old Heart of Mine" (with Ronald Isley)	Brian Holland, Lamont Dozier, Eddie Holland, Sylvia Moy	Storyteller	4:11
5.	"Young Turks"	Stewart, Carmine Appice, Kevin Savigar, Duane Hitchings	Tonight I'm Yours	5:04
6.	"Downtown Train"	Tom Waits	Storyteller	4:40
7.	"You Wear It Well"	Stewart, Quittenton	Never a Dull Moment	5:00
8.	"Reason to Believe" (Live with Ronnie Wood)	Tim Hardin	Unplugged...and Seated	3:52
9.	"Some Guys Have All the Luck"	Jeff Fortgang	Camouflage	4:34
10.	"Tonight's the Night (Gonna Be Alright)"	Stewart	A Night on the Town	3:56
11.	"Hot Legs"	Stewart	Foot Loose & Fancy Free	5:15
12.	"Da Ya Think I'm Sexy?"	Stewart, Appice	Blondes Have More Fun	5:30
13.	"My Heart Can't Tell You No"	Simon Climie, Dennis Morgan	Out of Order	5:16
14.	"You're in My Heart (The Final Acclaim)"	Stewart	Foot Loose & Fancy Free	4:30
15.	"Ooh La La"	Ronnie Wood, Ronnie Lane	When We Were the New Boys	4:16
16.	"Forever Young"	Stewart, Jim Cregan, Savigar	Out of Order	4:05
Total length:				74:13

Disc two: Encore
No.	Title	Writer(s)	From album	Length
1.	"Your Song"	Elton John, Bernie Taupin	Two Rooms: Celebrating the Songs of Elton John & Bernie Taupin	4:47
2.	"Having a Party" (Live with Ronnie Wood)	Sam Cooke	Unplugged...and Seated	4:15
3.	"Don't Come Around Here" (with Helicopter Girl a/k/a Jackie Joyce)	Paul Berry, Jackie Joyce, Mark Taylor, Kenny Thomas	Human	3:50
4.	"So Far Away"	Carole King	Tapestry Revisited: A Tribute to Carole King	4:24
5.	"The Motown Song" (with The Temptations)	Larry McNally	Vagabond Heart	4:16
6.	"Broken Arrow"	Robbie Robertson	Vagabond Heart	4:23
7.	"Crazy About Her"	Stewart, Cregan, Hitchings	Out of Order	4:29
8.	"Lost in You"	Stewart, Andy Taylor	Out of Order	4:26
9.	"Love Touch"	Gene Black, Mike Chapman, Holly Knight	Every Beat of My Heart	4:03
10.	"People Get Ready" (Live)	Curtis Mayfield	Unplugged...and Seated	4:46
11.	"Infatuation"	Stewart, Hitchings, Rowland Robinson	Camouflage	4:05
12.	"Baby Jane"	Stewart, Jay Davis	Body Wishes	4:45
13.	"Tonight I'm Yours"	Stewart, Cregan, Savigar	Tonight I'm Yours	4:13
14.	"That's What Friends Are For"	Burt Bacharach, Carole Bayer Sager	Night Shift (Soundtrack)	3:54
15.	"Passion"	Stewart, Phil Chen, Cregan, Gary Grainger, Savigar	Foolish Behaviour	5:30
16.	"I Don't Want to Talk About It"	Danny Whitten	Atlantic Crossing	4:14
17.	"I Was Only Joking"	Stewart, Grainger	Foot Loose & Fancy Free	4:49
18.	"The First Cut Is the Deepest"	Cat Stevens	A Night on the Town	3:21
Total length:				78:30

== Charts ==
=== Weekly charts ===
Chart (2001–2008)	Peak position
Australian Albums (ARIA)	5
Austrian Albums (Ö3 Austria)	35
Belgian Albums (Ultratop Flanders)	44
Danish Albums (Hitlisten)	3
Dutch Albums (Album Top 100)	56
German Albums (Offizielle Top 100)	18
Italian Albums (FIMI)	49
New Zealand Albums (RMNZ)	1
Portuguese Albums (AFP)	5
Scottish Albums (OCC)	4
Swedish Albums (Sverigetopplistan)	19
Swiss Albums (Schweizer Hitparade)	69
UK Albums (OCC)	7
US Billboard 200 The Voice	40
US Billboard 200 Encore	66

=== Year-end charts ===
Chart (2001)	Position
UK Albums (OCC)	27

Chart (2002)	Position
UK Albums (OCC)	137
US Billboard 200 The Voice	112

Chart (2008)	Position
New Zealand Albums (RMNZ)	47

== Certifications ==
Region	Certification	Certified units/sales
Argentina (CAPIF)	Platinum	40,000^{^}
Australia (ARIA)	2× Platinum	140,000^{^}
Belgium (BRMA)	Platinum	50,000^{*}
Brazil (Pro-Música Brasil)	Gold	50,000^{*}
Canada (Music Canada)	3× Platinum	300,000^{^}
Denmark (IFPI Danmark)	Platinum	50,000^{^}
Germany (BVMI)	Platinum	300,000^{^}
Ireland (IRMA)	7× Platinum	105,000^{^}
Netherlands (NVPI)	Gold	40,000^{^}
New Zealand (RMNZ)	4× Platinum	60,000^{^}
Portugal (AFP)	Gold	20,000^{^}
Sweden (GLF)	Gold	40,000^{^}
United Kingdom (BPI)	4× Platinum	1,200,000^{^}
United States (RIAA)	Platinum	1,000,000^{^}
Summaries
Europe (IFPI)	2× Platinum	2,000,000^{*}
^{*} Sales figures based on certification alone.^{^} Shipments figures based on certification alone.
