= The Best of Rod Stewart (1989 album) =

Greatest hits album by Rod Stewart
- Released: 27 November 1989
- Genre: Rock; soft rock; pop rock
- Length: 70:18
- Label: Warner Bros.
- Producer: Tom Dowd; Rod Stewart; Jim Cregan

Rod Stewart chronology
Out of Order (1988)	The Best of Rod Stewart (1989)	Storyteller – The Complete Anthology: 1964–1990 (1989)

Singles from The Best of Rod Stewart
- 1. "Downtown Train" Released: November 1989

Professional ratings
Review scores
Source	Rating
AllMusic	3/5 stars

The Best of Rod Stewart is a compilation album by British singer-songwriter Rod Stewart, released on the Warner Bros. record label in 1989. The album features many of Stewart's biggest solo hit singles, from 1971's "Maggie May" to "Downtown Train", which was released as a single in 1989. This album was released in the UK and other countries, but was not released in the US.

== Track listing ==
No.	Title	Writer(s)	Length
1.	"Maggie May" (from the album Every Picture Tells a Story)	Rod Stewart; Martin Quittenton	4:56
2.	"You Wear It Well" (from Never a Dull Moment)	Stewart; Quittenton	4:20
3.	"Baby Jane" (from Body Wishes)	Stewart; Jay Davis	4:42
4.	"Da Ya Think I'm Sexy?" (from Blondes Have More Fun)	Stewart; Carmine Appice	4:26
5.	"I Was Only Joking" (from Foot Loose & Fancy Free)	Stewart; Gary Grainger	4:48
6.	"This Old Heart of Mine" (with Ronald Isley; new version)	Holland–Dozier–Holland; Sylvia Moy	4:27
7.	"Sailing" (from Atlantic Crossing)	Gavin Sutherland	4:21
8.	"I Don't Want to Talk About It" (from Atlantic Crossing)	Danny Whitten	4:48
9.	"You're in My Heart" (from Foot Loose & Fancy Free)	Stewart	4:28
10.	"Young Turks" (from Tonight I'm Yours)	Stewart; Appice; Duane Hitchings; Kevin Savigar	4:35
11.	"What Am I Gonna Do (I'm So in Love with You)" (from Body Wishes)	Stewart; Davis; Tony Brock	3:36
12.	"The First Cut Is the Deepest" (from A Night on the Town)	Cat Stevens	3:52
13.	"The Killing of Georgie (Part I and II)" (from A Night on the Town)	Stewart	6:13
14.	"Tonight's the Night" (from A Night on the Town)	Stewart	3:34
15.	"Every Beat of My Heart" (from Every Beat of My Heart)	Stewart; Savigar	4:39
16.	"Downtown Train" (new track)	Tom Waits	4:30

Note

- Tracks 2, 5, 11 & 13 were not included on the vinyl issue and were added as 'bonus tracks' on the CD and cassette editions of the album.

== Charts ==
=== Weekly charts ===
Chart (1989)	Peak position
UK Albums (OCC)	3

Chart (1990)	Peak position
Australian Albums (ARIA)	7
Austrian Albums (Ö3 Austria)	12
Dutch Albums (Album Top 100)	6
German Albums (Offizielle Top 100)	6
Hungarian Albums (MAHASZ)	3
New Zealand Albums (RMNZ)	2
Swedish Albums (Sverigetopplistan)	23
Swiss Albums (Schweizer Hitparade)	25

=== Year-end charts ===
Chart (1990)	Position
Australian Albums (ARIA)	39
Dutch Albums (Album Top 100)	37
German Albums (Offizielle Top 100)	20
New Zealand Albums (RMNZ)	3

== Certifications ==
Region	Certification	Certified units/sales
Argentina (CAPIF)	2× Platinum	120,000^{^}
Australia (ARIA)	5× Platinum	350,000^{^}
Austria (IFPI Austria)	Platinum	50,000^{*}
Brazil (Pro-Música Brasil)	Platinum	250,000^{*}
Finland (Musiikkituottajat)	Gold	25,623
Germany (BVMI)	2× Platinum	1,000,000^{^}
Japan (RIAJ)	Gold	100,000^{^}
Netherlands (NVPI)	Platinum	100,000^{^}
New Zealand (RMNZ)	Platinum	15,000^{^}
Spain (PROMUSICAE)	Platinum	100,000^{^}
Switzerland (IFPI Switzerland)	Platinum	50,000^{^}
United Kingdom (BPI)	8× Platinum	2,400,000^{*}
^{*} Sales figures based on certification alone.^{^} Shipments figures based on certification alone.
