= Greatest Hits, Vol. 1 (Rod Stewart album) =

1979 compilation album by Rod Stewart

Greatest hits album by Rod Stewart
- Released: 12 October 1979
- Genres: Rock; folk rock; pop; dance
- Label: Warner Bros.

Rod Stewart chronology
Blondes Have More Fun (1978)	Greatest Hits, Vol. 1 (1979)	Foolish Behaviour (1980)

Greatest Hits, Vol. 1 is a best-of compilation by Rod Stewart, released in 1979 by Warner Bros. Records.

Professional ratings
Review scores
Source	Rating
AllMusic	4.5/5 stars
Christgau's Record Guide	B+
Music Week	4/4 stars
The Rolling Stone Album Guide	4/5 stars

== Track listing ==
1. "Hot Legs" (Rod Stewart, Gary Grainger)
2. "Maggie May" (Rod Stewart; Martin Quittenton)
3. "Da Ya Think I'm Sexy?" (Rod Stewart; Carmine Appice; Duane Wade)
4. "You're in My Heart (The Final Acclaim)" (Rod Stewart)
5. "Sailing" (Gavin Sutherland)
6. "I Don't Want to Talk About It" (Danny Whitten)
7. "Tonight's the Night (Gonna Be Alright)" (Rod Stewart)
8. "The Killing of Georgie (Part I and II)" (Rod Stewart)
9. "The First Cut Is the Deepest" (Cat Stevens)
10. "I Was Only Joking" (Rod Stewart; Gary Grainger)

== Charts ==
=== Weekly charts ===
Chart (1979–80)	Peak position
Australian Albums (Kent Music Report)	1
Austrian Albums (Ö3 Austria)	17
Canada Top Albums/CDs (RPM)	12
Dutch Albums (Album Top 100)	23
New Zealand Albums (RMNZ)	1
Norwegian Albums (VG-lista)	29
Swedish Albums (Sverigetopplistan)	27
UK Albums (Official Charts)	1
US Billboard 200	22

=== Year-end charts ===
Chart (1979)	Position
New Zealand Albums (RMNZ)	3
Chart (1980)	Position
Canada Top Albums/CDs (RPM)	62

== Certifications and sales ==
Region	Certification	Certified units/sales
Australia (ARIA)	4× Platinum	280,000^{^}
Austria (IFPI Austria)	Gold	25,000^{*}
Brazil	—	100,000
Canada (Music Canada)	2× Platinum	200,000^{^}
Germany (BVMI)	Gold	250,000^{^}
Hong Kong (IFPI Hong Kong)	Platinum	20,000^{*}
New Zealand (RMNZ)	Platinum	15,000^{^}
Switzerland (IFPI Switzerland)	Gold	25,000^{^}
United Kingdom (BPI)	Platinum	300,000^{^}
United States (RIAA)	3× Platinum	3,000,000^{^}
^{*} Sales figures based on certification alone.^{^} Shipments figures based on certification alone.
