= Gi' Me Wings =

1980 song by Rod Stewart

Single by Rod Stewart

from the album Foolish Behaviour
- Released: May 1981 (Japan)
- Length: 3:43
- Label: Warner Bros.
- Songwriter(s): Rod Stewart; Steve Harley (uncredited); Phil Chen; Kevin Savigar; Jim Cregan; Gary Grainger
- Producer(s): Harry the Hook; The Rod Stewart Group; Jeremy Andrew Johns

Rod Stewart singles chronology
"Oh God, I Wish I Was Home Tonight" (1981)	"Gi' Me Wings" (1981)	"Tonight I'm Yours (Don't Hurt Me)" (1981)

"Gi' Me Wings" is a song by British singer Rod Stewart, released in 1981 as the fifth and final single from his tenth studio album, Foolish Behaviour (1980). The song was written by Stewart and Steve Harley (lyrics), and Phil Chen, Kevin Savigar, Jim Cregan and Gary Grainger (music). It was produced by Stewart (credited as Harry the Hook), with co-production by the Rod Stewart Group and Jeremy Andrew Johns. "Gi' Me Wings" was released as a single in Japan only, but also reached number 45 on the US Billboard Top Rock Tracks chart.

== Background ==
Stewart co-wrote the lyrics to "Gi' Me Wings" with Steve Harley, although Harley did not receive a writing credit when it appeared on Foolish Behaviour. The pair also collaborated on the lyrics for another track that appeared on the album, "Somebody Special", as well as a third song that was not released. Harley recalled to Smiler in 1997,

"I still get paid for it – he's a naughty boy sometimes! Whether my name's there or not, there are people who were there when I wrote those words. Rod, he may just genuinely have forgotten. I was sitting around at the Sunset Marquis for three weeks writing the lyrics. I wrote nearly all of 'Somebody Special', I wrote lots of that with Rod, lots of it on my own, but 'Gi' Me Wings', that chorus is me, as are quite a lot of the lines in the verses. I was in the studio showing Rod how I wanted it to sit, I was conducting him in the singing. I was telling him where to put some of the accents."

== Critical reception ==
In a review of Foolish Behaviour, Debra Rae Cohen of Rolling Stone described "Gi' Me Wings" as "pounding" and added that "Valerie Carter's soaring backup vocals add more urgency than either the flamboyant brass arrangements or the self-pitying lyrics". Laura Fissinger of Trouser Press stated, "Stewart can still sing, of course, and delivers 'Gi' Me Wings' with the ease of a child skipping stones across a pond."

Randall Edwards of The Daily Utah Chronicle commented that "rock numbers" such as "Gi' Me Wings" "are tributes to a band that sounds like it's been playing together well for quite some time, anticipating every note, emphasizing every nuance." In a 2019 retrospective, Rhino Insider noted the song "has a burbling undercurrent that gives the track a pulse to go along with the studio sheen of the rest of the instrumentation".

== Track listing ==
7-inch single (Japan)

1. "Gi' Me Wings" - 3:43
2. "Somebody Special" - 4:27

== Personnel ==
Credits are adapted from the Foolish Behaviour LP sleeve notes.

"Gi' Me Wings"

- Rod Stewart – vocals
- Gary Grainger, Jim Cregan – guitars
- Kevin Savigar – keyboards
- Tim Bogert – bass
- Carmine Appice – drums, timpani
- Jim Price – trombone
- Earl Price – tenor saxophone
- James Gordon – baritone saxophone
- Lee Thornburg – trumpet

Production

- Harry the Hook (Rod Stewart) – producer
- The Rod Stewart Group – co-producers
- Jeremy Andrew Johns – co-producer, mixing
- Jim Cregan – mixing
- Rick Charles Delana – second engineer

== Charts ==
Chart (1981)	Peak position
US Mainstream Rock (Billboard)	45
