= Somebody Special (Rod Stewart song) =

1980 song by Rod Stewart

Single by Rod Stewart

from the album Foolish Behaviour
- Released: March 1981
- Length: 4:28
- Label: Warner Bros.
- Songwriter(s): Rod Stewart; Steve Harley; Phil Chen; Kevin Savigar; Jim Cregan; Gary Grainger
- Producer(s): Harry the Hook; The Rod Stewart Group; Jeremy Andrew Johns

Rod Stewart singles chronology
"My Girl" (1980)	"Somebody Special" (1981)	"Oh God, I Wish I Was Home Tonight" (1981)

"Somebody Special" is a song by British singer Rod Stewart, released by Warner Bros. in 1981 as the third single from his tenth studio album, Foolish Behaviour (1980). The song was written by Stewart and Steve Harley (lyrics), and Phil Chen, Kevin Savigar, Jim Cregan and Gary Grainger (music). It was produced by Stewart (credited as Harry the Hook), with co-production by the Rod Stewart Group and Jeremy Andrew Johns. "Somebody Special" reached number 71 on the US Billboard Hot 100.

== Background ==
Steve Harley co-wrote the lyrics to "Somebody Special" with Stewart. The pair also collaborated on the lyrics for another track that appeared on Foolish Behaviour, "Gi' Me Wings", as well as a third song that did not make the album. Harley recalled to Smiler in 1997, "I was sitting around at the Sunset Marquis for three weeks writing the lyrics. I wrote nearly all [the lyrics] of 'Somebody Special', I wrote lots of that with Rod, lots of it on my own, [and] 'Gi' Me Wings'."

== Critical reception ==
Upon its release as a single, Record World commented, "Rod's jagged vocal delivery turns good lyrics into great ones, as on this successor to his top 10 'Passion'." In a review of Foolish Behaviour, John Griffin of The Montreal Gazette described "Somebody Special" as "a beautiful, affirmative piece of advice for those who wonder whether true love will ever walk into their lives." Bill Flanagan of The Boston Globe felt the song "could be a Commodores hit". Debra Rae Cohen of Rolling Stone described the song as "a soulful duet with Susan Grindell that's nearly as powerful as the Teddy Pendergrass–Stephanie Mills collaborations".

== Track listing ==
7-inch single (US and Canada)

1. "Somebody Special" - 4:28
2. "She Won't Dance with Me" - 2:27

7-inch promotional single (US)

1. "Somebody Special" - 4:28
2. "Somebody Special" - 4:28

== Personnel ==
Credits are adapted from the Foolish Behaviour LP sleeve notes.

"Somebody Special"

- Rod Stewart – vocals
- Gary Grainger, Jim Cregan – guitars
- Kevin Savigar – keyboards
- Phil Chen – bass
- Colin Allen – drums
- Paulinho da Costa – percussion
- Susan Grindell – female vocals
- Del Newman – string arrangement

Production

- Harry the Hook (Rod Stewart) – producer ("Somebody Special")
- Tom Dowd – producer ("She Won't Dance with Me")
- The Rod Stewart Group – co-producers
- Jeremy Andrew Johns – co-producer, mixing
- Jim Cregan – mixing
- Rick Charles Delana – second engineer

== Charts ==
Chart (1981)	Peak position
US Billboard Hot 100	71
US Cash Box Top 100 Singles	79
