= Kevin Savigar =

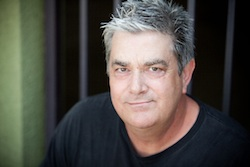

Background information
- Born: 9 November 1956 (age 69); London, England, U.K.
- Genres: Pop, rock, Americana, country, folk
- Occupations: Record producer, audio engineer, music executive, composer, songwriter
- Instruments: Keyboards, piano, organ, accordion
- Years active: 1978 – present
- Labels: Universal, Warner Bros., Mercury, Verve, Riva, Verse Music Group
- Website: kevinsavigar.com

Kevin Savigar (born 9 November 1956) is an English session keyboardist, record producer, songwriter, and composer based in Los Angeles, CA. Perhaps most recognised for his longtime collaboration with Rod Stewart, Savigar has also contributed to a wide range of recordings for artists such as Bob Dylan, George Harrison, John Mellencamp, Pat Benatar, Marilyn Manson, Willie Nelson, Randy Newman, Sinéad O'Connor, and Peter Frampton among others.

== Early life ==
Savigar was born in London, England in 1956. Savigar started to play the piano at age 5 and went on to study classical piano at the prestigious Trinity College of Music. By the age of 17, Savigar had begun his career as a session musician in the studios of London.

== Professional career ==
=== Rod Stewart ===
Savigar joined Rod Stewart's touring and recording band in 1978. Savigar worked in collaboration with Stewart, Phil Chen, Jim Cregan and Gary Grainger on Stewart's studio album Foolish Behaviour, which sold more than 5 million albums worldwide. Savigar co-produced six tracks on Stewart's 2013 studio album Time.

Singles
Year	Song	Rank
1980	"Passion"	17(UK), 5(US), 13(GER)
1980	"My Girl"	32 (UK)
1981	"Somebody Special"	71 (US)
1981	"Oh God, I Wish I Was Home Tonight"	74 GER)

==== Rod Stewart discography ====
Year	Song	Album	Album Rank
1980	"Passion" “My Girl" “Somebody Special"	Foolish Behaviour, 4(UK) 12 (US)	
1983	"Move Me" “Body Wishes" “Ghetto Blasters" “Strangers Again" "Satisfied"	Body Wishes, 5(UK) 30 (US)	
1988	"Forever Young" “When I Was Your Man" "My Heart Can't Tell You No"	Out of Order, 20 On Billboard Top 200	
1989	"Move Me" “Body Wishes" “Ghetto Blasters" “Strangers Again" "Satisfied"	Storyteller – The Complete Anthology: 1964–1990, 31(UK) 54 (US)	
1993	"Forever Young"	Unplugged...and Seated, 2(UK) 2 (US)	
1995	"Lady Luck" “Muddy, Sam and Otis"	A Spanner in the Works, 4(UK) 35(US)	
1998	"When We Were The New Boys"	When We Were the New Boys, 2(UK) 44(US)	
2001	"Young Turks" "Every Beat of My Heart" “Tonight I'm Yours" "Passion"	The Story So Far: The Very Best of Rod Stewart, N/A	
2008	"Young Turks" "Forever Young" “Passion" “Tonight I'm Yours"	The Definitive Rod Stewart, N/A	
2006	"Auld Lang Syne" Arrangement	Merry Christmas, Baby, 4(UK) 3(US)	

=== Additional works ===
Kevin has contributed to the following works listed below:

Singles
Year	Album	Artist
1975	"Live at London Weekend Television"	National Youth Jazz Orchestra
1977	"Under The Glass"	Easy Street
1978	"Changing Winds"	Maddy Prior
1980	"Night"	Planet 10
1980	"Long Distance"	Night
1981	"Live and Uncensored"	Millie Jackson
1982	"Night"	Planet 10
1986	"Somebody Up There Likes Me"	Michael Des Barres
1986	"Darling"	Robert Hazard
1987	"Raising Fear"	Armored Saint
1987	"Mercy"	Steve Jones
1988	"Wide Awake in Dreamland"	Pat Benatar
1988	"Passion"	Norman Connors
1988	"Down in the Grove"	Bob Dylan
1988	"Based on a True Story"	The Del-Lords
1989	"Wake Me When It's Over"	Faster Pussycat
1989	"Strong Enough"	One Nation
1989	"Best Shots"	Pat Benatar
1990	"Two Fires"	Jimmy Barnes
1990	"Stilleto"	Lita Ford
1990	"David Cassidy"	David Cassidy
1990	"Blue Tears"	Blue Tears
1991	"Thump"	Michael Morales
1991	"The Regulators"	Regulators
1991	"Soul Deep"	Jimmy Barnes
1991	"Rhythm Syndicate"	Rhythm Syndicate
1990	"Passion"	Rhythm Syndicate
1990	"Live Your Life, Be Free"	Belinda Carlisle
1990	"Hollywood Vampires"	L.A. Guns
1991	"Day One"	Robbie Nevil
1991	"Dangerous Curves"	Lita Ford
1991	"Dancin' On Coals"	Bang Tango
1991	"Blow Up"	The Smithereens
1992	"What Goes On"	The Sighs
1994	"Peter Frampton"	Peter Frampton

==== Awards ====
In total, Savigar has won 6 ASCAP awards, 16 RIAA awards, 10 Brit Awards aka BPI awards, 2 SOCAN awards and a Nashville Songwriters Association International No. 1 award.

- 1980 Brit Awards for Foolish Behaviour by Rod Stewart
- 1980 RIAA award for Foolish Behaviour by Rod Stewart
- 1981 Brit Awards for Tonight I'm Yours by Rod Stewart
- 1982 RIAA award for Tonight I'm Yours by Rod Stewart
- 1983 Brit Awards for Body Wishes by Rod Stewart
- 1984 Brit Awards for Camouflage by Rod Stewart
- 1984 RIAA award for Camouflage by Rod Stewart
- 1986 Brit Awards for Every Beat of My Heart by Rod Stewart
- 1988 RIAA award for Out of Order by Rod Stewart
- 1988 Brit Awards for Out of Order by Rod Stewart
- 1990 ASCAP Pop award for writer Forever Young
- 1990 RIAA award for Storyteller – The Complete Anthology: 1964–1990 by Rod Stewart
- 1990 RIAA award for Downtown Train by Rod Stewart
- 1990 ASCAP Pop award for publisher Forever Young
- 1990 SOCAN award for writer Forever Young
- 1990 SOCAN Pop award for publisher Forever Young
- 1991 RIAA award for Vagabond Heart by Rod Stewart
- 1991 Brit Awards for Vagabond Heart by Rod Stewart
- 1992 RIAA award for '’Patty Smyth'’ by Patty Smyth
- 1993 RIAA award for Unplugged...and Seated by Rod Stewart
- 1995 RIAA award for A Spanner in the Works by Rod Stewart
- 1995 Brit Awards for The Best of Rod Stewart by Rod Stewart
- 1996 RIAA award for If We Fall in Love Tonight by Rod Stewart
- 1996 Brit Awards for If We Fall in Love Tonight by Rod Stewart
- 1996 ASCAP Pop award for writer "Hold On" by Jamie Walters
- 1996 ASCAP Pop award for publisher "Hold On" by Jamie Walters
- 2001 Nashville Songwriters Association International award for Nothin' To Lose by Josh Gracin
- 2003 RIAA award for co-writer The Cheetah Girls by the Cheetah Girls
- 2004 RIAA award for The Story So Far: The Very Best of Rod Stewart by Rod Stewart
- 2005 ASCAP Country music award for writer Nothin' To Lose by Josh Gracin
- 2005 ASCAP Country Music award for publisher Nothin' To Lose by Josh Gracin
- 2012 RIAA award for Merry Christmas, Baby by Rod Stewart
