= Passion (Rod Stewart song) =

Single by Rod Stewart

from the album Foolish Behaviour
- B-side: "Better Off Dead"
- Released: 24 October 1980
- Recorded: 1980
- Length: 4:45 (promo 7" edit); 5:29 (7"/album); 7:30 (promo 12" edit)
- Label: Warner Bros.
- Songwriters: Rod Stewart; Phil Chen; Gary Grainger; Jim Cregan; Kevin Savigar
- Producers: Harry the Hook; Jeremy Andrew Johns; the Rod Stewart Group

Rod Stewart singles chronology
"(If Loving You Is Wrong) I Don't Want to Be Right" (1980)	"Passion" (1980)	"My Girl" (1980)

Music video
- "Passion" on YouTube

"Passion" is a song by Rod Stewart that first appeared in 1980 on his album Foolish Behaviour. It was the lead single and biggest hit from the album, reaching number five on the US Billboard Hot 100, number two in Canada, and a sizeable hit across Europe. The song was also released as a 12-inch promotional single with an extended running time of 7:30.

== Background ==
"Passion" describes the ubiquity of the phenomenon, delineating its universality by listing many of the people, places, and situations in which it is found. Passion is described as a powerful but dangerous essential motivator, being so compelling that it is prone to sometimes break outside the boundaries of loving relationships. 'Hear it on the radio' and 'read it in the papers' speaks of the potentially disruptive power of unleashed desire.

== Reception ==
Billboard wrote "This up-tempo number has strong pop orchestration effectively pitted against Stewart's throaty vocals" and that the song has a "catchy" hook. Record World said that the song has "menacing guitar runs, percussion fever & [Stewart's] vocal parchment."

== Personnel ==
- Rod Stewart – lead and backing vocals
- Jim Cregan – guitar
- Gary Grainger – guitar
- Phil Chen – bass
- Kevin Savigar – keyboards, synthesizers
- Carmine Appice – drums, Roland CR-78 programming
- Paulinho da Costa – percussion

== Chart performance ==
=== Weekly charts ===
Chart (1980–1981)	Peak position
Australia (Kent Music Report)	16
Austria (Ö3 Austria Top 40)	14
Belgium (Ultratop 50 Flanders)	4
Canada (RPM)	2
Ireland (IRMA)	16
Italy (FIMI)	14
Netherlands (Dutch Top 40)	4
Netherlands (Single Top 100)	5
New Zealand (Recorded Music NZ)	7
South Africa (Springbok)	1
Sweden (Sverigetopplistan)	5
Switzerland (Schweizer Hitparade)	4
UK Singles (Official Charts)	17
US Billboard Hot 100	5
US Hot R&B/Hip-Hop Songs (Billboard)	65
US Cash Box Top 100	4
US Record World	6
West Germany (GfK)	13
Zimbabwe (ZIMA)	4

=== Year-end charts ===
Chart (1980)	Position
Belgium (Ultratop Flanders)	88

Chart (1981)	Position
Canada (RPM)	22
Italy (FIMI)	49
South Africa	9
US Billboard Hot 100	38
US Cash Box	51

== Popular culture ==
- "Passion" was prominently featured in the 1984 drama film New York Nights (later known as Shackin' Up).
