= Human (Rod Stewart album) =

Studio album by Rod Stewart
- Released: 12 March 2001
- Recorded: 2000
- Studios: Metropolis Studios, London; Riverside Studios, Fort Lauderdale, Florida; Round One Studios, Los Angeles; Olympic Studios, London
- Genres: Rock; pop rock
- Length: 45:23
- Label: Atlantic
- Producers: Gregg Alexander; Dennis Charles; Rob Dickins (exec.); Karl Gordon; Danny Kortchmar; Christopher Neil; Octave; Brian Rawling; Graham Stack; Mark Taylor

Rod Stewart chronology
When We Were the New Boys (1998)	Human (2001)	The Story So Far (2001)

Professional ratings
Aggregate scores
Source	Rating
Metacritic	57/100
Review scores
Source	Rating
Allmusic	1/5 stars
Entertainment Weekly	C+
Mojo	3.5/5 stars
Q	3/5 stars
Rolling Stone	3/5 stars
Wall of Sound	65/100
Yahoo! Music UK	4/10 stars

Human is the nineteenth studio album by Rod Stewart released on 12 March 2001. It was Stewart's first, and only release on Atlantic Records. It produced the singles "Run Back Into Your Arms", "I Can't Deny It", "Soul On Soul" and "Don't Come Around Here" with "I Can't Deny It" became a moderate hit, peaking at number 26 in the United Kingdom, Stewart's most recent Top 40 to date in that chart. The album was certified gold by the British Phonographic Industry. Human was also his first album not to feature an original Stewart track. On the third track, "Don’t Come Around Here", Stewart is joined by Helicopter Girl.

== Track listing ==
Standard version
No.	Title	Writer(s)	Producer(s)	Length
1.	"Human"	Karl Gordon, Conner Reeves	Gordon, Octave^{[a]}, Michelle Escoffery^{[b]}	3:48
2.	"Smitten"	Macy Gray, Dave Wilder, Jeremy Ruzuma, Arik Marshall	Dennis Charles, Danny Kortchmar^{[c]}	5:00
3.	"Don't Come Around Here" (with Helicopter Girl)	Jackie Joyce, Paul Berry, Mark Taylor, Kenny Thomas	Taylor	3:49
4.	"Soul on Soul"	Marc Jordan, John Capek	Charles, Christopher Neil^{[c]}	4:30
5.	"Loveless"	Reeves, David Frank	Neil	4:00
6.	"If I Had You"	Andrew Davis, Sergei Rachmaninoff	Neil	4:18
7.	"Charlie Parker Loves Me"	Jordan, Capek	Charles, Neil^{[c]}	4:41
8.	"It Was Love That We Needed"	Curtis Mayfield	Neil	4:11
9.	"To Be with You"	Raul Malo, James House	Rod Stewart	3:56
10.	"Run Back into Your Arms"	Graham Stack, John Reid, Brian Rawling	Taylor, Rawling, Stack	3:26
11.	"I Can't Deny It"	Gregg Alexander, Rick Nowels	Alexander, Nowels^{[b]}, Danielle Brisebois^{[b]}	3:44

European and Japanese version (bonus track)
No.	Title	Writer(s)	Producer(s)	Length
12.	"Peach"	Prince	Gordon, Octave^{[a]}, Dave Way^{[d]}, Keith Uddin^{[d]}	3:47

Notes

- ^a signifies an additional producer
- ^b signifies an additional vocal producer
- ^c signifies a lead vocal producer
- ^d signifies a lead vocal producer

== Personnel ==
- Rod Stewart – vocals
- Steve Pigott – keyboards (5, 6, 8), bass (6, 8)
- Chris Pelcer – keyboards (6, 8), bass (6, 8)
- Slash – guitars (1)
- Robbie McIntosh – guitars (5, 6)
- Mark Knopfler – guitar solo (6)
- Jesse Johnson – guitars (8)
- Pino Palladino – bass (5)
- Nick Richards – drum programming (5, 6, 8), percussion (5, 6, 8)
- Robyn Smith – string arrangements and conductor (3)
- Toby Chapman – string arrangements (10)
- Gary Wallis – string arrangements (10)
- Gavyn Wright – string conductor and leader (10)
- Simon Hale – string transcriptions (10)
- The London Session Orchestra – orchestra (3, 10)
- Helicopter Girl – vocals (3)
- Connor Reeves – backing vocals (5)
- Alexandra Brown – backing vocals (6)
- Carl Carwell – backing vocals (6)
- Sue Ann Carwell – backing vocals (6, 8, 11)
- Jeff Pescetto – backing vocals (6)
- Jackie Simley-Stevens – backing vocals (6, 11)
- Yvonne Williams – backing vocals (6, 11)
- Danielle Brisebois – backing vocals (11)
- Joe Turano – backing vocals (11)

=== Production ===
- Rob Dickins – executive producer
- Neil Aldridge – recording (1)
- André Hortsmann – recording (1)
- Sam Noel – recording (2, 4, 7)
- Steve Price – engineer (3)
- Simon Hurrell – lead vocal recording (4, 7), recording (5, 6, 8)
- Roger Sommers – recording (9)
- Walter Turbitt – guitars and bass recording (10)
- Chris Brown – recording (11)
- Ed Colman – recording (11)
- Moe El-Khamlichi – recording (11)
- Avril Mackintosh – Pro Tools engineer (11)
- Meredith Leung – recording assistant (1)
- Richard Wilkinson – recording assistant (1)
- Dave Way – mixing (1, 4–8)
- Keith Uddin – mix assistant (1, 4–8)
- Dennis Charles – mixing (2), remixing (4, 7)
- Niven Garland – mixing (2), remixing (4, 7)
- Mark Taylor – mixing (3, 10)
- Steve Churchyard – mixing (9), recording (11)
- Michael H. Brauer – mixing (11)
- Stewart Whitmore – digital editing
- Stephen Marcussen – mastering
- Marcussen Mastering (Hollywood, California) – editing and mastering location
- Richard Bates – art direction
- Andrea Brooks – art direction, design
- Tony Duran – photography
- Arnold Stiefel and Annie Challis – management

== Charts ==
Chart performance for Human
Chart (2001)	Peak position
Australian Albums (ARIA)	55
Austrian Albums (Ö3 Austria)	19
Danish Albums (Hitlisten)	25
German Albums (Offizielle Top 100)	9
Scottish Albums (Official Charts)	6
Swedish Albums (Sverigetopplistan)	13
Swiss Albums (Schweizer Hitparade)	36
UK Albums (Official Charts)	9
US Billboard 200	50
