= List of people from the London Borough of Camden =

The London Borough of Camden was created in 1965 from the former area of the metropolitan boroughs of Hampstead, Holborn, and St Pancras, which had formed part of the County of London. The borough was named after Camden Town, which had gained its name from Charles Pratt, 1st Earl Camden in 1795. Since the 17th century, many famous people have lived in its various districts and neighbourhoods.

== Bloomsbury residents ==
Bloomsbury is an area of central London between Euston Road and Holborn, developed by the Russell family in the 17th and 18th centuries into a fashionable residential area. It is notable for its array of garden squares, literary connections (exemplified by the Bloomsbury Group), and numerous hospitals and academic institutions.

== Camden Town residents ==
Camden Town is located 2.4 miles (3.9 km) north-northwest of Charing Cross and is one of the 35 major centres identified in the London Plan. Its industrial heritage has made way for retail, tourism and entertainment, including a number of markets and music venues that are strongly associated with alternative culture.

== Hampstead residents ==
Hampstead has long been known as a residence of the intelligentsia, including writers, composers, and intellectuals, actors, artists and architects — many of whom created a bohemian community in the late 19th century. In the 1930s it became base to a community of avant garde artists and writers and was host to a number of émigrés and exiles from Nazi Europe. Hampstead has more millionaires within its boundaries than any other area of the United Kingdom.

== Haverstock residents ==
Haverstock is an area and electoral ward in the Borough of Camden. It is centred on Haverstock Hill and Chalk Farm, with Gospel Oak to the north; Kentish Town to the east; Camden Town to the south, and Swiss Cottage to the west. The area to the west of the hill, with the NW3 Belsize Park/Hampstead post code, is very wealthy, while the Queen's Crescent NW5 area to the east of the hill is home to Queen's Crescent Market.

== Highgate residents ==
Highgate is an area of North London on the north-eastern corner of Hampstead Heath. Until late Victorian times it was a distinct village outside London, sitting astride the main road to the north. The area retains many green expanses including the eastern part of Hampstead Heath, three ancient woods, and Waterlow Park. Part of Highgate lies in the London Borough of Camden. The remainder lies in the London Boroughs of Haringey and Islington

== Kentish Town residents ==
Kentish Town is first recorded during the reign of King John (1207) as kentisston. By 1456 Kentish Town was recognised as a thriving hamlet, and in this period a chapel of ease is recorded as being built for the inhabitants. Kentish Town was a prime site for development as the Kentish Town Road was a major route from London northwards. Probably its most famous resident was Karl Marx who lived at 9 Grafton Terrace from 1856.

== Primrose Hill residents ==
Primrose Hill located on the north side of Regent's Park. The for which it is named has a clear view of Central London to the south-east, as well as Belsize Park and Hampstead to the north. Friedrich Engels, political philosopher and co-author of The Communist Manifesto spent his last years at 122 Regent's Park Road.

== Somers Town residents ==
Somers Town, named after the Somers family who owned the land, is an area of London south of Camden Town. It has been strongly influenced by the three mainline north London railway termini: Euston (1838), St Pancras (1868) and King's Cross (1852), together with the Somers Town railway and canal goods depot (1887), where the British Library now stands.

== Tufnell Park residents ==
Tufnell Park straddles the border of the London Borough of Islington and the London Borough of Camden. Its most infamous resident was Dr Crippen who lived at 39 Hilldrop Crescent and murdered his wife there.

== See also ==
- List of districts in Camden
