= Every Beat of My Heart (Rod Stewart song) =

1986 single by Rod Stewart

Single by Rod Stewart

from the album Every Beat of My Heart
- B-side: "Trouble"
- Released: 30 June 1986
- Length: 5:18
- Label: Warner Bros.
- Songwriters: Rod Stewart; Kevin Savigar
- Producer: Bob Ezrin

Rod Stewart singles chronology
"Love Touch" (1986)	"Every Beat of My Heart" (1986)	"Another Heartache" (1986)

Music video
- "Every Beat of My Heart" on YouTube

"Every Beat of My Heart" is a song by British singer Rod Stewart. Written by Stewart and Kevin Savigar and produced by Bob Ezrin, the song is a sentimental ballad with lyrics about Stewart returning to the United Kingdom after a long period overseas. The song was included on Stewart's 14th studio album, Every Beat of My Heart (1986), and was released as its second single on 30 June 1986. Music critics were divided on the track, but it became a commercial hit in Europe, peaking at number two on both the UK and Irish singles charts. It was not as successful in North America, stalling outside the top 75 in the United States and Canada.

== Critical reception ==
Music & Media magazine listed "Every Beat of My Heart" as a "recommended" song from the parent album along with "In My Life". British trade paper Music Week called the song an updated version of Rod Stewart's 1975 hit "Sailing" with "ludicrous Eighties drumming", noting that it would serve well as an encore song and a "favourite last smooch with lager and lime lovers in discos everywhere". Robin Smith of Record Mirror also noted the similarities with "Sailing" and wrote that Stewart did not deliver an impressive performance, writing that the song "probably sounds a lot better after 15 pints of McEwans". Alan Jones, writing for the same publication, stated that he disliked the song but understood its appeal as a "stirringly patriotic anthem" in the vein of "Sailing". Reviewing the album on AllMusic, Dave Thompson picked "Every Beat of My Heart" as a standout track, noting its "wistful romance" and calling it "remarkable".

== Chart performance ==
On the UK Singles Chart, "Every Beat of My Heart" debuted at number 17 for the week starting 6 July 1986. The following week, it jumped to number two, giving Stewart his 18th top-10 hit in the United Kingdom. The song spent nine weeks on the chart and was the UK's 57th-best-selling single of 1986 according to Music Week, receiving a silver certification from the British Phonographic Industry (BPI) for shipping over 250,000 copies. In Ireland, the song also peaked at number two—making it Stewart's 17th top-10 Irish single—and stayed in the top 30 for eight weeks.

The single peaked at number three in Belgium and entered the top 20 in Austria, Italy, the Netherlands, Switzerland, and West Germany, achieving a peak of number five on the European Hot 100 Singles chart. On South Africa's Springbok Radio chart, the track peaked at number 20. In Australasia, "Every Beat of My Heart" reached number 26 in Australia and number 32 in New Zealand. The song did not become a hit in North America, peaking at number 83 on the US Billboard Hot 100 and number 95 on the Canadian RPM 100 Singles chart.

== Track listings ==
7-inch single

A. "Every Beat of My Heart"
B. "Trouble"

12-inch single

A1. "Every Beat of My Heart" (Tartan mix)
B1. "Trouble"
B2. "Every Beat of My Heart" (LP version)

Limited-edition 12-inch single

A1. "Every Beat of My Heart" (Tartan mix)
A2. "Trouble"
B1. "Some Guys Have All the Luck" (live at Wembley Stadium, 5 July 1986)
B2. "I Don't Want to Talk About It" (live at Wembley Stadium, 5 July 1986)

== Charts ==
=== Weekly charts ===
Chart (1986)	Peak position
Australia (Kent Music Report)	26
Austria (Ö3 Austria Top 40)	6
Belgium (Ultratop 50 Flanders)	3
Canada Top Singles (RPM)	95
Europe (European Hot 100 Singles)	5
Ireland (IRMA)	2
Italy (Musica e dischi)	12
Netherlands (Dutch Top 40)	8
Netherlands (Single Top 100)	11
New Zealand (Recorded Music NZ)	32
South Africa (Springbok Radio)	20
Switzerland (Schweizer Hitparade)	11
UK Singles (Official Charts)	2
US Billboard Hot 100	83
West Germany (GfK)	14

=== Year-end charts ===
Chart (1986)	Position
Belgium (Ultratop)	33
Europe (European Hot 100 Singles)	57
Netherlands (Dutch Top 40)	70
Netherlands (Single Top 100)	81
UK Singles (OCC)	57

== Certifications ==
Region	Certification	Certified units/sales
United Kingdom (BPI)	Silver	250,000^{^}
^{^} Shipments figures based on certification alone.
