= Foolish Behaviour =

Studio album by Rod Stewart
- Released: 21 November 1980
- Recorded: November–December 1979; February–September 1980
- Studios: Record Plant (Los Angeles, California); Cherokee Studios (Hollywood, California)
- Genres: Rock, pop rock
- Length: 41:01
- Labels: Warner Bros., Riva
- Producers: Harry the Hook; The Rod Stewart Group; Jeremy Andrew Johns; (except "She Won’t Dance With Me" – Tom Dowd)

Rod Stewart chronology
| Rod Stewart Greatest Hits Vol.1 (1979) | Foolish Behaviour (1980) | Tonight I'm Yours (1981) |

Singles from Foolish Behaviour
- 1. "Passion" Released: October 1980; 2. "My Girl" Released: December 1980; 3. "Somebody Special" Released: March 1981 (US); 4. "Oh God, I Wish I Was Home Tonight" Released: March 1981 (UK); 5. "Gi' Me Wings" Released: May 1981 (Japan)

Professional ratings
Review scores
| Source | Rating |
|---|---|
| AllMusic | 2/5 stars |
| Robert Christgau | C+ |
| Record Mirror | 3/5 stars |
| Smash Hits | 6/10 |

Foolish Behaviour is the tenth studio album by Rod Stewart, released on 21 November 1980, through Riva label in the United Kingdom and on Warner Bros. Records in the United States. The tracks were recorded at The Record Plant Studios and Cherokee Studios in Los Angeles from February to September 1980. "Passion", "My Girl", "Somebody Special", "Oh God, I Wish I Was Home Tonight" and "Gi' Me Wings" were released as singles.

The video to another song on the album, "She Won't Dance With Me", was the third video to be played on MTV when it launched 1 August 1981. The lyrics contain the use of the word "fuck" which was edited out by means of a foghorn sound playing over the offending word, and a crudely superimposed heron covering Stewart's mouth. In order to maintain a sense of continuity, the heron can briefly be seen again at around the 2.00 mark, attacking the backing singers before flying off.

== Track listing ==
All tracks written by Rod Stewart, Phil Chen, Kevin Savigar, Jim Cregan and Gary Grainger; except where noted.

Side one

1. "Better off Dead" (Stewart, Chen, Savigar, Carmine Appice) – 3:07
2. "Passion" – 5:29
3. "Foolish Behaviour" – 4:24
4. "So Soon We Change" – 3:44
5. "Oh God, I Wish I Was Home Tonight" – 5:02

Side two

1. "Gi' Me Wings" – 3:47
2. "My Girl" (Stewart, Chen, Savigar, Cregan, Grainger, Appice) – 4:27
3. "She Won’t Dance with Me" (Stewart, Jorge Ben) – 2:30
4. "Somebody Special" (Stewart, Steve Harley, Chen, Savigar, Cregan, Grainger) – 4:29
5. "Say It Ain’t True" – 4:02

German cassette release bonus track

1. "I Just Wanna Make Love to You" (Live) (Willie Dixon)
- "Passion" was also released as a promo 12" single with a track length of 7:30. This extended version was also a bonus track on the US 8-track and US cassette releases.

== Personnel ==
Musicians

- Rod Stewart – vocals, harmonica (3)
- Kevin Savigar – keyboards (1–7, 9, 10)
- John Jarvis – keyboards (8)
- Jim Cregan – guitars (1, 2, 4, 6–10), acoustic guitar (3), electric guitar (3), all guitars (5)
- Gary Grainger – guitars (1, 2, 4, 6–10), electric guitar (3), dobro (3)
- Billy Peek – guitars (1, 8)
- Phil Chen – bass (1–4, 9, 10)
- James Haslip – bass (5)
- Tim Bogert – bass (6–8)
- Carmine Appice – drums (1–3, 6–8), timpani (6)
- Roger Bethelmy – drums (4)
- Colin Allen – drums (5, 9, 10)
- Paulinho da Costa – percussion (2, 4, 9)
- Phil Kenzie – saxophones (1, 3, 8)
- Jim Gordon – baritone saxophone (6)
- Lon Price – tenor saxophone (6)
- Billy Lamb – trombone (1, 3, 8)
- Jim Price – trombone (6)
- Lee Thornburg – trumpet (6)
- Sid Page – violin (5)
- Del Newman – string arrangements (7, 9, 10)

Background vocalists

- Valerie Carter – vocals
- Colin Allen – backing vocals (3)
- Tony Brock – backing vocals (3)
- Jim Cregan – backing vocals (3, 5)
- Jackie Lomax – backing vocals (3)
- Susan Grindell – female vocals (9)

=== Production ===
- "Harry the Hook" (Rod Stewart) – producer (1–7, 9, 10), design concept
- Jeremy Andrew Johns – co-producer (1–7, 9, 10), mixing
- The Rod Stewart Group – co-producers (1–7, 9, 10)
- Tom Dowd – producer (8)
- The Somerset Segovia (Jim Cregan) – mixing
- Karat Faye – engineer
- Rick Charles Delena – second engineer, engineer (5)

== Charts ==
| Chart (1981) | Peak position |
|---|---|
| Australian Albums (Kent Music Report) | 9 |

== Certifications ==
| Region | Certification | Certified units/sales |
|---|---|---|
| Canada (Music Canada) | Platinum | 100,000^{^} |
| France (SNEP) | Gold | 100,000^{*} |
| New Zealand (RMNZ) | Platinum | 15,000^{^} |
| United Kingdom (BPI) | Platinum | 300,000^{^} |
| United States (RIAA) | Platinum | 1,000,000^{^} |
^{*} Sales figures based on certification alone.^{^} Shipments figures based on certification alone.
