= Love Touch =

Single by Rod Stewart

from the album Every Beat of My Heart
- B-side: "Heart Is on the Line"
- Released: 12 May 1986
- Length: 4:03
- Label: Warner Bros.
- Songwriters: Michael Chapman; Holly Knight
- Producer: Michael Chapman

Rod Stewart singles chronology
"People Get Ready" (1985)	"Love Touch" (1986)	"Another Heartache" (1986)

"Love Touch" is a song performed by Rod Stewart and written by Holly Knight, Mike Chapman. It was released as a single in 1986 and peaked at #6 on the Billboard Hot 100. The song is played over the end credits of the Robert Redford-Debra Winger romantic comedy Legal Eagles and is often listed with the subtitle "Theme from Legal Eagles" even though it doesn't appear on the film's soundtrack album, distributed by MCA Records. The song is a plea from someone who has been fighting with his lover, but is apologizing and asking for another chance to "be good" after being entangled in a complete sense of pride.

== Reception ==
Cash Box called it "a delightfully perky little ditty, melodic and catchy as the day is long." Billboard said "steel drums carry unhurried rhythms, and the rocker is temporarily tamed into a crooner."

Although it is among Stewart's most successful singles, he rarely performs "Love Touch" in concert. Stewart holds a low opinion of the song's lyrics, calling it "one of the silliest songs I've ever recorded," in the liner notes of Encore: The Very Best of Rod Stewart Volume 2.

== Charts ==
Chart (1986)	Peak position
Canada Adult Contemporary (RPM)	3
Canada Top Singles (RPM)	7
UK Singles (Official Charts)	27
US Adult Contemporary (Billboard)	5
US Billboard Hot 100	6
US Mainstream Rock (Billboard)	26
US Cashbox	7
West Germany (GfK)	14

Year-end chart (1986)	Rank
Canada Top Singles (RPM)	62
US Top Pop Singles (Billboard)	82
