= Camouflage (Rod Stewart album) =

Studio album by Rod Stewart
- Released: 8 June 1984
- Recorded: 1984
- Studios: Lion Share, Los Angeles, California
- Genre: Rock
- Length: 36:33
- Label: Warner Bros.
- Producers: Michael Omartian (except "Bad for You" - Rod Stewart)

Rod Stewart chronology
Body Wishes (1983)	Camouflage (1984)	Every Beat of My Heart (1986)

Singles from Camouflage
- 1. "Infatuation" Released: May 1984; 2. "Some Guys Have All the Luck" Released: 20 July 1984; 3. "Trouble" Released: November 1984 (UK); 4. "All Right Now" Released: November 1984 (US)

Camouflage is the thirteenth studio album by Rod Stewart released in 1984 by Warner Bros. Records. The four singles from the album were "Infatuation", "Trouble", a cover of The Persuaders hit "Some Guys Have All the Luck", and a cover of the Free hit, "All Right Now". The album marked a reunion of sorts between Stewart and Jeff Beck, who plays guitar on several tracks, as the two had been members of the influential 1960s group The Jeff Beck Group.

== Album information ==
All the tracks were recorded at Lion Share Studio in Los Angeles, California. Grammy Award-winning producer Michael Omartian produced all the songs except "Bad for You", which was self-produced by Stewart. In the liner notes, a disclaimer alludes to the reason behind this (specifically mentioning that Omartian was recently "born again").

== Critical reception ==
Professional ratings
Review scores
Source	Rating
AllMusic	2/5 stars
Record Mirror	1/5 stars
The Rolling Stone Album Guide	3/5 stars
Sounds	3.5/5 stars

The album received similar reviews to its predecessor, Body Wishes, although Stephen Thomas Erlewine of AllMusic retrospectively called it "relatively better", due to a couple of strong singles in "Infatuation" and "Some Guys Have All the Luck". A review was not given in Rolling Stone magazine, but in the review for the album's successor, Every Beat of My Heart, they called the album "overly slick".

== Track listing ==
1. "Infatuation" (Rod Stewart, Duane Hitchings, Rowland Robinson) – 5:13
2. "All Right Now" (Andy Fraser, Paul Rodgers) – 4:41
3. "Some Guys Have All the Luck" (Jeff Fortang [sic]) – 4:33
4. "Can We Still Be Friends" (Todd Rundgren) – 3:46
5. "Bad for You" (Stewart, Kevin Savigar, Jim Cregan) – 5:17
6. "Heart Is on the Line" (Stewart, Jay Davis) – 4:02
7. "Camouflage" (Stewart, Savigar, Michael Omartian) – 5:19
8. "Trouble" (Stewart, Omartian) – 4:42

== Personnel ==
- Rod Stewart – vocals
- Kevin Savigar – keyboards
- Michael Omartian – keyboards, percussion, backing vocals, horn arrangements
- Jeff Beck – guitar solo (1, 4, 5)
- Jim Cregan – guitars
- Michael Landau – guitars
- Robin Le Mesurier – guitars
- Jay Davis – bass
- Tony Brock – drums
- Jimmy Zavala – harmonica
- Gary Herbig – saxophone solos
- Kim Hutchcroft – horns
- Charlie Loper – horns
- Chuck Findley – horns
- Gary Grant – horns
- Jerry Hey – horns

== Production ==
- Michael Omartian – producer (1–4, 6–8)
- Rod Stewart – producer (5)
- John Guess – engineer, mixing
- Tom Fouce – second engineer
- Steve Hall – mastering at Future Disc (Hollywood, California)
- Jeff Ayeroff – art direction
- Paula Greif – art direction
- Michael Hodgson – art direction, design
- Steven Meisel – cover photography
- Arnold Stiefel – management

== Charts ==
=== Weekly charts ===
Weekly chart performance for Camouflage
Chart (1984)	Peak position
Australian Albums (Kent Music Report)	34
Austrian Albums (Ö3 Austria)	5
Dutch Albums (Album Top 100)	13
German Albums (Offizielle Top 100)	6
Norwegian Albums (VG-lista)	16
Swedish Albums (Sverigetopplistan)	7
Swiss Albums (Schweizer Hitparade)	7
UK Albums (Official Charts)	8
US Billboard 200	18

=== Year-end charts ===
1984 year-end chart performance for Camouflage
Chart (1984)	Position
German Albums (Offizielle Top 100)	55
UK Albums (OCC)	97
US Billboard 200	87

== Certifications ==
Certifications and sales for Camouflage
Region	Certification	Certified units/sales
Spain (Promusicae)	Gold	50,000^{^}
United Kingdom (BPI)	Silver	60,000^{^}
United States (RIAA)	Gold	500,000^{^}
^{^} Shipments figures based on certification alone.
