= Every Beat of My Heart (Rod Stewart album) =

Studio album by Rod Stewart
- Released: 23 June 1986
- Studios: Artisan Sound Recorders and One On One Studios (North Hollywood, California); Can-Am Recorders (Tarzana, California); The Village Recorder and Record Plant (Los Angeles, California); Cherokee Studios (Hollywood, California) (“Love Touch”)
- Genres: Rock, Pop rock
- Length: 42:37
- Label: Warner Bros.
- Producers: Bob Ezrin (except "Love Touch" – Michael Chapman)

Rod Stewart chronology
Camouflage (1984)	Every Beat of My Heart (1986)	Out of Order (1988)

Singles from Every Beat of My Heart
- 1. "Love Touch" Released: 12 May 1986; 2. "Every Beat of My Heart" Released: 30 June 1986 (UK); 3. "Another Heartache" Released: August 1986 (US); 4. "In My Life" Released: 24 November 1986

Professional ratings
Review scores
Source	Rating
AllMusic	2/5 stars
Rolling Stone	(average)

Every Beat of My Heart is the fourteenth studio album by Rod Stewart released in 1986 by Warner Bros. Records. The tracks were recorded at One on One Studios, Can Am Recorders, Cherokee Studios, The Village Recorder, The Record Plant, and Artisan Sound Recorders. The album produced four singles: "Love Touch", "Another Heartache", "In My Life", and "Every Beat of My Heart". In the United States, the album was released under the eponymous title of Rod Stewart.

== Content ==
Included on this album is the song "Love Touch", which gained popularity as the theme to the Robert Redford film Legal Eagles. "Love Touch" was written by Holly Knight, Mike Chapman, and Gene Black. The album also includes a cover of Lennon–McCartney's "In My Life", one of several times Rod covered them. It was released as a single which failed to chart. According to the liner notes, this album is dedicated to Rod's parents Bob and Elsie Stewart. "Every Beat of My Heart" was the biggest hit of the album and reached number two in the UK Singles Chart in July 1986.

== Critical reception ==
A contemporary review for Rolling Stone by David Wilde called the album an improvement on predecessor Camouflage but criticized "Love Touch" as well as "In My Life" as a cover choice. By contrast, a retrospective review on Allmusic by Dave Thompson dubbed Stewart's version of "In My Life" one of the two best songs on the album alongside the title track, giving the overall album two stars. Another review of the album by Stephen Thomas Erlewine called it 'an utter lack of convincing popcraft' and 'the worst the singer recorded.'

Cash Box said of the title track that it's "a rock ballad that shimmers with solid production values and the singer's trademark grainy voice." Billboard called it a "emotional ballad about belonging, delivered with believability."

== Track listing ==
1. "Here to Eternity" (Rod Stewart, Kevin Savigar) – 5:58
2. "Another Heartache" (Bryan Adams, Jim Vallance, Stewart, Randy Wayne) – 4:29
3. "A Night Like This" (Stewart) – 4:06
4. "Who's Gonna Take Me Home" (Stewart, Savigar, Jay Davis) – 4:38
5. "Red Hot in Black" (Stewart, Jim Cregan, Kevin Savigar) – 3:30
6. "Love Touch" (Mike Chapman, Gene Black, Holly Knight) – 3:59
7. "In My Own Crazy Way" (Stewart, Frankie Miller, Troy Seals, Eddie Setser) – 3:17
8. "Every Beat of My Heart" (Stewart, Kevin Savigar) – 5:18
9. "Ten Days of Rain" (Stewart, Savigar, Tony Brock) – 5:21
10. "In My Life" (John Lennon, Paul McCartney) – 2:00

== Personnel ==
Musicians

- Rod Stewart – vocals
- Kevin Savigar – keyboards
- Nicky Hopkins – keyboards
- Bob Ezrin – keyboards
- Randy Wayne – keyboards
- Paul Fox – keyboards
- Jim Cregan – guitars, backing vocals
- Robin Le Mesurier – guitars
- Robert Athis (Kane Roberts) – guitars
- John Corey – guitars, electric sitar
- Gene Black – guitars
- Steve Cropper – guitars
- Nils Lofgren – guitars
- David Williams – guitars
- Jay Davis – bass
- Patrick O'Hearn – bass
- Scott Edwards – bass
- Tony Brock – drums
- Tom Scott – brass, reeds
- Larry Williams and Co. – brass, reeds
- Devon Dickinson – bagpipes
- Harry Farrar – bagpipes
- Kevin Weed – bagpipes

Background vocalists

- Tray Galaway, Phil Perry, Kevin Dorsey, Daryl Phinnesse, Oren Waters – the singers
- John Batdorf, Mike Chapman, Jim Cregan, Clydene Edwards, Bob Ezrin, Albert Hammond, Darlene Koldenhoven, Holly Knight, Jennifer Repo, Jeoffrey Repo, Joe Turano, Carmen Twillie – additional backing vocals

== Production ==
- Bob Ezrin – producer (1–5, 7–10)
- Michael Chapman – producer (6)
- Malcolm Cullimore – production coordinator (1–5, 7–10)
- Jeff Ayeroff – art direction
- Jeri McManus – art direction, design
- Phillip Dixon – photography
- Randy Phillips – management
- Arnold Stiefel – management
- Peter F. Baynes – crew
- Gary Zipperman – crew

Technical credits

- Doug Sax – mastering at The Mastering Lab (Hollywood, California)
- Robert Hrycyna – technical director (1–5, 7–10)
- Paul Lani – recording (1–5, 7–10)
- Bob Ezrin – remixing (1–5, 7–10)
- David Tickle – remixing (1–5, 7–10), additional recording (1–5, 7–10)
- George Tutko – engineer (6), remixing (6)
- Jeff Bennett – additional recording (1–5, 7–10)
- Brian Christian – additional recording (1–5, 7–10)
- Peter Lewis – additional recording (1–5, 7–10)
- David Ahlert – remix assistant (1–5, 7–10)
- Jim Dineen – remix assistant (1–5, 7–10)
- Craig Engle – remix assistant (1–5, 7–10)
- Stan Katayama – remix assistant (1–5, 7–10)
- Bob Loftus – remix assistant (1–5, 7–10)

== Charts ==
=== Weekly charts ===
Chart (1986)	Peak position
Australian Albums (Kent Music Report)	26
Austrian Albums (Ö3 Austria)	2
Dutch Albums (Album Top 100)	13
German Albums (Offizielle Top 100)	4
Norwegian Albums (VG-lista)	12
Swedish Albums (Sverigetopplistan)	3
Swiss Albums (Schweizer Hitparade)	5
UK Albums (Official Charts)	5

=== Year-end charts ===
Chart (1986)	Position
Austrian Albums (Ö3 Austria)	14
Dutch Albums (Album Top 100)	74
German Albums (Offizielle Top 100)	32
Swiss Albums (Schweizer Hitparade)	19

== Certifications ==
Region	Certification	Certified units/sales
Austria (IFPI Austria)	Gold	25,000^{*}
Germany (BVMI)	Gold	250,000^{^}
Switzerland (IFPI Switzerland)	Gold	25,000^{^}
United Kingdom (BPI)	Gold	100,000^{^}
^{*} Sales figures based on certification alone.^{^} Shipments figures based on certification alone.
