= I Was Only Joking =

Single by Rod Stewart

from the album Foot Loose & Fancy Free
- B-side: "Born Loose"
- Released: April 1978
- Recorded: 1977
- Genre: Soft rock
- Length: 6:07 (album version); 4:50 (single version)
- Label: Warner Bros.
- Songwriters: Gary Grainger, Rod Stewart
- Producer: Tom Dowd

Rod Stewart singles chronology
| "Hot Legs" (1978) | "I Was Only Joking" (1978) | "Ole Ola (Mulher Brasileira)" (1978) |

Music video
- "I Was Only Joking" on YouTube

"I Was Only Joking" is a song written by Gary Grainger and Rod Stewart released by Stewart in 1978 as the third single on his 1977 album, Foot Loose & Fancy Free. The song performed well, reaching the Top 40 in various countries, including the United Kingdom (No. 5) and the United States (No. 22). In the UK, "I Was Only Joking" charted as part of a double A-side with "Hot Legs".

== Reception ==
Billboard said that Stewart is in "top form interpreting insightful lyrics over a rhythmic, semi-acoustic rock foundation," and Billboard also praised the string and mandolin playing. Cash Box called the song "a gentle ballad about growing and learning" and called the guitar playing "clean." Record World called it "perhaps the most thoughtful song" from "Foot Loose and Fancy Free."

== Chart performance ==
=== Weekly charts ===
| Chart (1977) | Peak position |
|---|---|
| Canada Top Singles (RPM) | 15 |
| Canada Adult Contemporary (RPM) | 11 |
| Ireland (IRMA) | 4 |
| New Zealand (Recorded Music NZ) | 35 |
| UK Singles (Official Charts) | 5 |
| US Billboard Hot 100 | 22 |
| US Adult Contemporary (Billboard) | 31 |
| U.S. Cash Box Top 100 | 19 |

=== Year-end charts ===
| Chart (1978) | Rank |
|---|---|
| U.S. (Joel Whitburn's Pop Annual) | 144 |
