= Body Wishes =

Studio album by Rod Stewart
- Released: 10 June 1983
- Recorded: 1982
- Studios: Record Plant (Los Angeles, California)
- Genres: Rock, pop rock
- Length: 41:19
- Label: Warner Bros.
- Producers: Tom Dowd; Rod Stewart; Jim Cregan; George Tutko; Jimmy Iovine

Rod Stewart chronology
Absolutely Live (1982)	Body Wishes (1983)	Camouflage (1984)

Alternative Cover

Singles from Body Wishes
- 1. "Baby Jane" Released: 27 May 1983 (UK); 2. "What Am I Gonna Do" Released: 12 August 1983; 3. "Sweet Surrender" Released: November 1983

Body Wishes is the twelfth studio album by Rod Stewart released in 1983 by Warner Bros. Records. The tracks were recorded and mixed at The Record Plant, Los Angeles. It produced three singles, "Baby Jane", "What Am I Gonna Do (I'm So in Love with You)", and "Sweet Surrender". The cover is a tribute to the cover of the Elvis Presley album, 50,000,000 Elvis Fans Can't Be Wrong.

== Critical reception ==
Professional ratings
Review scores
Source	Rating
AllMusic	1.5/5 stars
Rolling Stone	2/5 stars

Body Wishes has received poor reviews. Rolling Stone magazine, at the time of its release, gave it 2 out of 5 stars, calling it "his latest and surely one of his least", although they did praise the opening song, "Dancin' Alone", calling it "a Chuck Berry-styled Rock & Roller that is both lively and witty". Stephen Thomas Erlewine of AllMusic retrospectively gave the album 1.5 out of 5 stars, calling it "one of Rod Stewart's worst efforts." In the same review, "Baby Jane" and "What Am I Gonna Do (I'm So in Love with You)" are described as "first-rate, synth-laden pop/rock filler" only sounding "substantial" in comparison to the other songs on the album.

== Track listing ==
No.	Title	Writer(s)	Length
1.	"Dancin' Alone"	Rod Stewart, Robin Le Mesurier	4:03
2.	"Baby Jane"	Stewart, Jay Davis	4:44
3.	"Move Me"	Stewart, Tony Brock, Jay Davis, Wally Stocker, Kevin Savigar	3:36
4.	"Body Wishes"	Stewart, Jim Cregan, Kevin Savigar, Robin Le Mesurier	4:41
5.	"Sweet Surrender"	Stewart, Le Mesurier	4:00
6.	"What Am I Gonna Do (I'm So in Love with You)"	Stewart, Davis, Brock	4:19
7.	"Ghetto Blaster"	Stewart, Cregan, Savigar	4:07
8.	"Ready Now"	Stewart, Stocker	3:34
9.	"Strangers Again"	Stewart, Cregan, Savigar	4:10
10.	"Satisfied"	Stewart, Bernie Taupin, Cregan, Savigar	4:08

== Personnel ==
- Rod Stewart – vocals
- Kevin Savigar – keyboards, synthesizers
- Jim Cregan – acoustic guitars, electric guitars, backing vocals
- Robin Le Mesurier – acoustic guitars, electric guitars
- Jay Davis – bass, backing vocals
- Tony Brock – drums, percussion, backing vocals
- Tommy Vig – additional percussion
- Jimmy Zavala – saxophone, flute, harmonica

=== Production ===
- Rod Stewart – producer
- Tom Dowd – producer, mixing
- Jim Cregan – co-producer, mixing
- George Tutko – co-producer, mixing, engineer
- Jimmy Iovine – producer (6)
- Robert Blakeman – group photograph
- Leon Lecash – photographs of Rod Stewart
- Kosh – art direction, design
- Ron Larson – art direction, design

== Charts ==
=== Weekly charts ===
Chart (1983)	Peak position
Australian Albums (Kent Music Report)	14
Dutch Albums (Album Top 100)	6
German Albums (Offizielle Top 100)	2
New Zealand Albums (RMNZ)	25
Swedish Albums (Sverigetopplistan)	3
UK Albums (Official Charts)	5
US Billboard 200	30

=== Year-end charts ===
Chart (1983)	Position
German Albums (Offizielle Top 100)	7

== Certifications ==
Region	Certification	Certified units/sales
Canada (Music Canada)	Platinum	100,000^{^}
France (SNEP)	Gold	100,000^{*}
Germany (BVMI)	Platinum	500,000^{^}
Spain (Promusicae)	Gold	50,000^{^}
United Kingdom (BPI)	Gold	100,000^{^}
^{*} Sales figures based on certification alone.^{^} Shipments figures based on certification alone.
