= You're in My Heart (The Final Acclaim) =

Single by Rod Stewart

from the album Foot Loose & Fancy Free
- B-side: "You Got a Nerve"
- Released: 30 September 1977
- Recorded: 1977
- Genre: Easy listening; pop rock
- Length: 4:30
- Label: Warner Bros.
- Songwriter: Rod Stewart
- Producer: Tom Dowd

Rod Stewart singles chronology
"The First Cut Is the Deepest" (1977)	"You're in My Heart (The Final Acclaim)" (1977)	"Hot Legs" (1978)

"You're in My Heart (The Final Acclaim)" is a song written and recorded by Rod Stewart for his 1977 album Foot Loose & Fancy Free. The song became a hit, reaching the top ten of many countries, including the United States (number 4), United Kingdom (number 3), Canada (number 2), and Australia, peaking at number 1 for one week.

The lyrics mention two of Stewart's favourite football teams in the phrase "Celtic, United". The inner sleeve to the album Foot Loose & Fancy Free also pictures artwork with the names Glasgow Celtic and Manchester United drifting out of a car stereo.

== Reception ==
Billboard declared that "You're in My Heart" should become "Stewart's biggest easy listening hit" and felt the vocal style was similar to "The Killing of Georgie". Record World said that "it's slow, introspective, the story of a relationship many should recognize."

== Personnel ==
- Rod Stewart – vocals
- Jim Cregan – guitars, backing vocals
- Phil Chen – bass
- Carmine Appice – drums, backing vocals
- David Foster – Fender Rhodes electric piano
- Fred Tackett – acoustic guitar
- Nicky Hopkins – string synthesizer
- Richard Greene – violin

== Chart performance ==
=== Weekly charts ===
Chart (1977–1978)	Peak position
Australia (Kent Music Report)	1
Belgium (Ultratop 50 Flanders)	13
Belgium (Ultratop 50 Wallonia)	46
Canada CRIA	2
Canada Top Singles (RPM)	1
Canada Adult Contemporary (RPM)	3
Ireland (IRMA)	2
Netherlands (Single Top 100)	8
New Zealand (Recorded Music NZ)	2
Norway (VG-lista)	35
UK Singles (Official Charts)	3
US Billboard Hot 100	4
US Adult Contemporary (Billboard)	17

=== Year-end charts ===
Chart (1977)	Rank
New Zealand	32
Australia (Kent Music Report)	23

Chart (1978)	Rank
Australia (Kent Music Report)	81
Canada	36
US Billboard Hot 100	37

== Certifications ==
Region	Certification	Certified units/sales
New Zealand (RMNZ)	Gold	15,000^{‡}
United States (RIAA)	Gold	1,000,000^{^}
^{^} Shipments figures based on certification alone.^{‡} Sales+streaming figures based on certification alone.
