= Hot Legs =

Single by Rod Stewart

from the album Foot Loose & Fancy Free
- B-side: "You're Insane" or "I Was Only Joking"
- Released: 20 January 1978
- Recorded: 1977
- Genre: Hard rock; boogie rock
- Length: 5:15 (album); 3:55 (single)
- Label: Warner Bros.
- Songwriters: Rod Stewart, Gary Grainger
- Producer: Tom Dowd

Rod Stewart singles chronology
"You're in My Heart" (1977)	"Hot Legs" (1978)	"I Was Only Joking" (1978)

"Hot Legs" is a single by Rod Stewart released in 1978 as the second single from his 1977 album Foot Loose & Fancy Free. The single performed moderately on the Billboard Hot 100, reaching number 28, but performed better on the UK Singles Chart, peaking at number 5. In the UK, "Hot Legs" and "I Was Only Joking" charted together as a double A-side.

In 1993, Stewart recorded a live version during his MTV Unplugged session which appeared on the album Unplugged...and Seated. Since the original recording, the lyrics in the last verse have been changed.

The lead guitar that is prominent throughout the song was performed by Billy Peek, a Saint Louis, Missouri native who was in Stewart's band in the mid-seventies.

== Reception ==
Billboard described "Hot Legs" as a "blistering blues rocker" comparable to the best Rolling Stones songs. Cash Box said that it is a "solid kicker from the proven Stewart rock n' roll good-time format." Record World said that Stewart's "voice and sense of humor are intact, while his L.A.-session-allstar cast lays down a satisfyingly raunchy backup."

== Charts ==
Chart (1978)	Peak position
Belgium (Ultratop 50 Flanders)	22
Germany (GfK)	34
Netherlands (Single Top 100)	28
Ireland (IRMA)	4
New Zealand (Recorded Music NZ)	31
UK Singles (OCC)	5
US Billboard Hot 100	28
