= Phil Chen =

Jamaican musician (1946–2021)

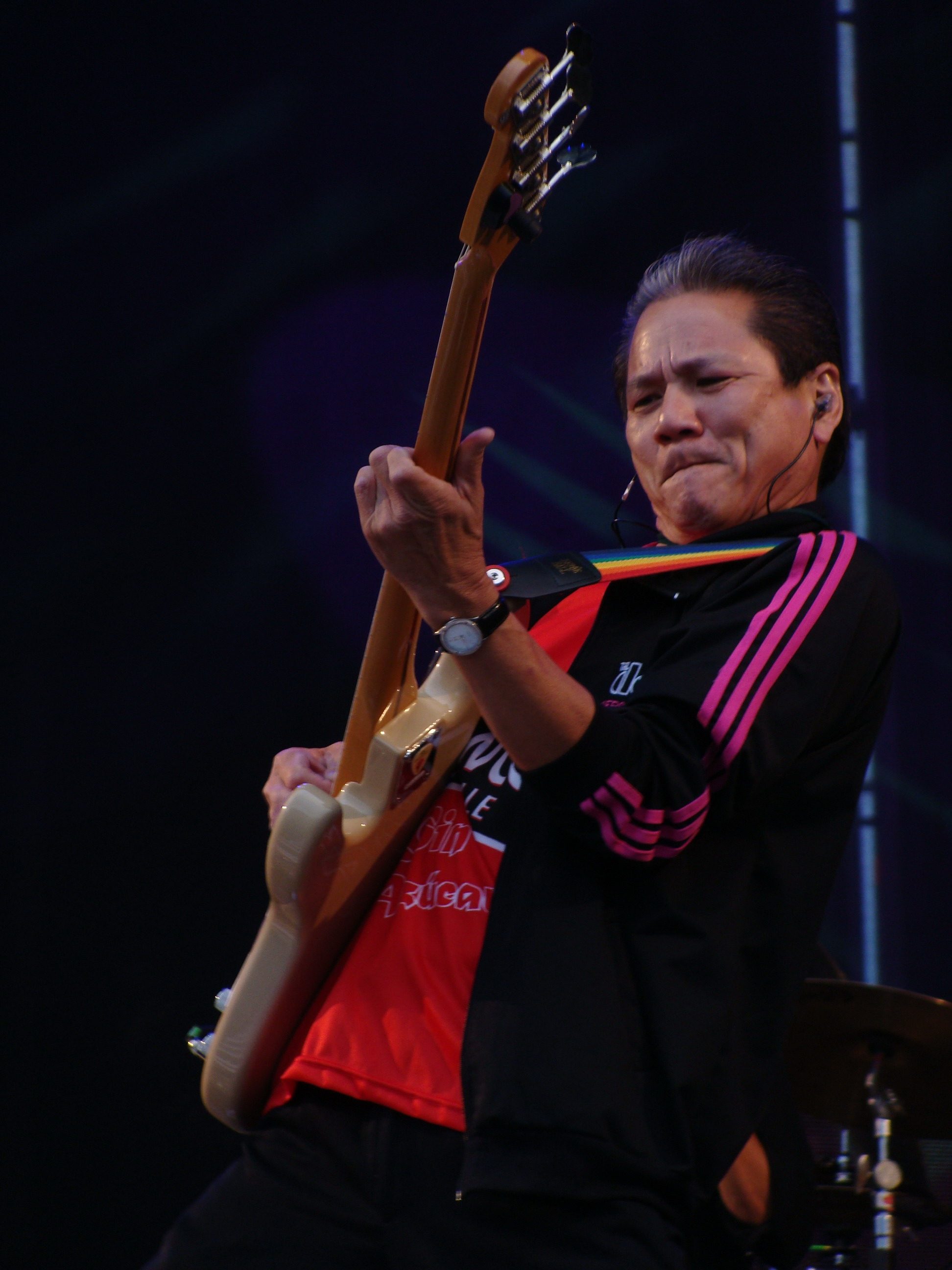
- Chen with Riders on the Storm in 2008.

Background information
- Born: Phillip David Chen; 21 October 1946
- Origin: Kingston, Jamaica
- Died: 14 December 2021 (aged 75)
- Genres: Rock, disco, R&B, soul, reggae
- Occupation: Musician
- Instrument: Bass guitar
- Years active: 1960s–2021
- Label: Epic
- Formerly of: Manzarek-Krieger, The Butts Band, Rod Stewart, Star Fleet Project, Jimmy James and the Vagabonds

Phillip David Chen OD (21 October 1946 – 14 December 2021) was a Jamaican bassist. He was one of Britain's most utilized session bassists during the 1970s and 1980s. He played for Jeff Beck, for Rod Stewart from 1977 to 1980, and later with Ray Manzarek and Robby Krieger of the Doors.

== Life and career ==
Chen was born on 21 October 1946 and was of Chinese ancestry. He spent much of his early life in Kingston, Jamaica, and attended St. George's College. He played in the Vikings in the 1960s, and in bands on the club circuit in Kingston before relocating to England.

Chen worked with numerous nationally known musicians during his career. He first joined Jimmy James and the Vagabonds in 1965, before realizing that he could make much more money as a session musician. He went on to record with Donovan on his album Cosmic Wheels (1973), Jeff Beck on the platinum selling albums Blow by Blow (1974) and Wired (1976), and Joan Armatrading on Back to the Night (1975). Chen also joined the Butts Band, led by Doors guitarist Robby Krieger and drummer John Densmore, and recorded their 1974 self-titled debut with them.

Chen joined Rod Stewart's band performing on three of his albums, Foot Loose & Fancy Free (1977), Blondes Have More Fun (1978), and Foolish Behaviour (1980) and performed on some of his biggest hits: "Da Ya Think I'm Sexy?", "You're in My Heart" and "Hot Legs", as well as appearing in the video for the latter. He was also a member of Brian May's Star Fleet Project, along with Eddie Van Halen, in 1983.

Other musicians with whom Chen performed and recorded include Pete Townshend, Eric Clapton, Ray Charles, Desmond Dekker, Jerry Lee Lewis, Bob Marley, Jimmy Cliff, Jackson Browne, Dave Edmunds, and Linda Lewis, among others.

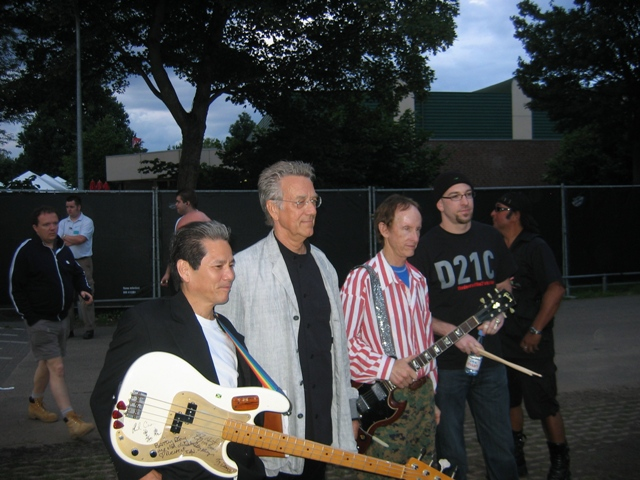
Chen (left) with The Doors of the 21st Century in 2004.

In 2004, he joined Krieger and Ray Manzarek in their Doors reformation, Manzarek–Krieger. He was also a member of their Doors tribute band Riders on the Storm.

Chen received the Jamaican Order of Distinction in 2014.

== Personal life ==
Chen died from cancer on 14 December 2021, at the age of 75.
