= The Killing of Georgie (Part I and II) =

"The Killing of Georgie Parts 1 and 2"

Single by Rod Stewart

from the album A Night on the Town
- B-side: "Fool for You" (UK); "Rosie" (US)
- Released: 13 August 1976 (UK)
- Genre: Pop rock; soft rock; progressive pop
- Length: 6:30
- Label: Riva (UK); Warner (US)
- Songwriter: Rod Stewart
- Producer: Tom Dowd

Rod Stewart singles chronology
"Tonight's the Night (Gonna Be Alright)" (1976)	"The Killing of Georgie Parts 1 and 2" (1976)	"Get Back" (1976)

Music video
- "The Killing of Georgie (Part I and II)" on YouTube

"The Killing of Georgie (Part I and II)" is a song written and recorded by Rod Stewart and released as a track on his 1976 album A Night on the Town. The song tells the story of a gay man who was killed in New York City. A two-part song, Part I was the more popular hit and was blended into the more melancholy and sombre Part II.

The song was released as a single in August 1976 and spent ten weeks on the UK Singles Chart, reaching a peak position of No. 2. It charted moderately well elsewhere, reaching No. 25 in the Netherlands, No. 30 in the US and No. 33 in Canada.

== Lyrics ==
In its first part, the song briefly tells the story of Georgie, a semi-fictional gay man who was a friend of Stewart's. When Georgie comes out as gay to his parents, his mother cries and his father asks how this can be "after all [he's] said and done for him." Georgie, cast out, heads for New York City on a Greyhound bus. Upon arriving, he becomes both accepted and popular in Manhattan's upper class—"the toast of the Great White Way"—as well as a beloved member of the local gay community. Stewart last sees him in the summer of 1975 and Georgie tells him that he's in love, which Stewart is pleased to know. Georgie attends the opening night of a Broadway show, but leaves on foot "before the final curtain fell." Walking "arm in arm" with a companion, he is attacked near East 53rd Street at 3rd Avenue in Midtown Manhattan by gangmembers from New Jersey, who emerge from "a darkened side street." One thief knocks Georgie down, inadvertently killing him on the sidewalk's edge. Stewart recites the late Georgie's advice on living life vigorously and to the full, especially as it is fleeting. In the second part of the song, Stewart pleads for the deceased Georgie to stay, remarking on behalf of all that knew him, "You take our breath away."

Stewart has admitted to taking some poetic license with the details of the actual murder on which the song is based. For example, the song states that Georgie was killed in "the summer of '75", to suit the song's lyrical rhyming, however the character the song was based on died in 1974.

== Background ==
In the May 1995 issue of Mojo, Stewart explained: "That was a true story about a gay friend of [Stewart's earlier group] The Faces. He was especially close to me and Mac [Faces' pianist Ian McLagan]. But he was knifed or shot, I can't remember which. That was a song I wrote totally on me own over the chord of open E". The switchblade knife in the song's lyrics implies that Georgie was stabbed to death.

When he was asked about writing a song with a gay theme, Stewart said, "It's probably because I was surrounded by gay people at that stage. I had a gay PR man, a gay manager. Everyone around me was gay. I don't know whether that prompted me into it or not. I think it was a brave step, but it wasn't a risk. You can't write a song like that unless you've experienced it. But it was a subject that no one had approached before. And I think it still stands up today".

Part II provides a coda to the song and employs a melody similar to The Beatles' "Don't Let Me Down". In a 1980 interview, John Lennon said, "the lawyers never noticed". Stewart noted: "It does sound like it", adding "I’m sure if you look back to the 60s, you’d find other songs with those three chords and that melody line".

== Reception ==
Billboard said that the lyrics were "a topic of social import" and that Stewart's "gravelly" vocal performance contrasted well with the melody. Record World said that "Stewart's saga of the death of a gay friend has received much FM play and been hailed as a breakthrough for the artist."

== Charts ==
=== Weekly charts ===
Chart (1976–1977)	Peak position
Australia Kent Music Report	38
Canada RPM Top Singles	33
Netherlands	25
UK Singles Chart	2
U.S. Billboard Hot 100	30

=== Year-end charts ===
Chart (1976)	Rank
UK	45

Chart (1977)	Rank
Canada	200
U.S. (Joel Whitburn's Pop Annual)	175
