= Gary Grainger =

- Grainger in 2010

Background information
- Born: 20 October 1950 (age 75); Kilburn, London, England
- Origin: Hastings, Sussex, England
- Genres: Rock, pop, blues rock
- Occupations: Musician, songwriter
- Instrument: Guitar
- Years active: 1972–present

Gary Grainger (born 20 October 1950) is an English rock, blues, jazz and pop songwriter and guitarist, most known for his work with Rod Stewart.

== Career ==
=== 1970–1999 ===
Gary Grainger's professional career took off with the formation of Strider. After two albums – Misunderstood and Exposed and two extensive tours with The Faces in 1974, Grainger got his big break with Rod Stewart in 1976. The formation of the Rod Stewart group, including Jim Cregan, Phil Chen, Carmine Appice and Billy Peek, saw Grainger write key songs for the albums Foot Loose & Fancy Free, Blondes Have More Fun, and Foolish Behaviour.

Throughout 1986 and 1987, Grainger worked with Roger Daltrey, with UK TV appearances on No. 73 and Saturday Live. He played on Daltrey's 1987 album, Can't Wait to See the Movie. When Daltrey resumed activity with The Who and suspended solo work, Grainger formed a band with Jimmy Copley and Jaz Lochrie.

Grainger performed live and on TV appearances with Nick Lowe in support of Lowe's Party of One album in 1990. He also appeared on Lowe's 1994 album The Impossible Bird.

In 1991, Grainger formed The Humans with Jess Roden, Jim Capaldi, Bill Burke and Nick Graham. The Humans recorded their first batch of songs at John Entwistle's Hammerhead studios, with Bob Pridden as producer and engineer, with Steve Winwood on Hammond Organ. Only "Railroad of Desire" was released from these recordings on 1995's self-titled album. The band performed regularly throughout the UK and Europe until the late 1990s.

In the mid-nineties Grainger was recruited to produce and play guitar for the Brit Pop band The Face at the request of The Who's long-time crew member Bob Pridden. He played on the original recordings, during which time he recommended Zak Starkey for the sessions. For live shows, Grainger opted out and The Face used Gary Nuttall, who went on to become long-time guitarist for Robbie Williams.

In 1998 Grainger formed Blues Club with Alan Rogan. Peter Hope-Evans of Medicine Head was on mouth organ and Kinks drummer Mick Avery joined. They were initially recorded and produced by Pete Townshend with Jess Roden on vocals. When Avery had other commitments, Chris Slade (AC/DC) joined on drums up until 2000. It was this line-up of Blues Club that appeared on BBC TV's Casualty programme. Blues Club continued for another decade, with Grainger's son Chris replacing Avery and Slade on drums.

=== 2000–present ===
In 2000, Grainger received a call to work with Kenney Jones. Initially collaborating for some charity gigs, the band proved popular and formed a more solid line-up featuring Boz Burrell on bass, Robert Hart on vocals. Formula One racing champion Damon Hill joined the band on many of the early gigs. Their first recording was the charity single "It's All About the Children" and was produced by the legendary Chris Kimsey. The single also featured Paul Young on vocals.

Grainger played at the Ronnie Lane 2004 Tribute at the Royal Albert Hall onstage with Kenney Jones, Sam Brown, Ronnie Wood and Pete Townshend.

In 2007, Roger Daltrey played corporate shows in Canada. Grainger was asked to join, playing Townshend's parts along with The Who's touring band of Zak Starkey, John "Rabbit" Bundrick, Simon Townsend and Phil Spalding played bass.

From 2010 to 2012, Grainger resumed working with Rod Stewart bandmate Jim Cregan in a project called "Apart From Rod". Touring the UK and Europe, Apart From Rod was a presentation of duo's large catalogue of hits that they had written for Stewart, including Grainger's songs "Hot Legs", "Passion", and "I Was Only Joking".

== Musicians ==
Gary Grainger has worked with B.A. Robertson, Damon Hill, Rod Stewart, Danny Bowes, Jess Roden, Jim Capaldi, John Entwistle, Kenney Jones, Nick Lowe, Paul Carrack, Paul Young, Pete Townshend, Ringo Starr, Robert Hart, Roger Daltrey, Ronnie Wood, Sam Brown, and Strider.

== Personal life ==
Grainger was born in London and grew up in London's Kilburn area. He has one son, Chris Grainger, who is a drummer.

== Discography ==
With Strider

- Exposed (1973)
- Misunderstood (1974)

With Rod Stewart

- Foot Loose & Fancy Free (1977)
- Blondes Have More Fun
- Greatest Hits Vol. 1 (1979)
- Foolish Behaviour (1980)
- The Rod Stewart Sessions 1971–1998 (2009)

With Roger Daltrey

- Can't Wait to See the Movie (1987)

With Jess Roden and the Humans

- Jess Roden and the Humans (1995)
- Live at the Robin 1996 (2004)

With Nick Lowe

- The Impossible Bird (1994)
- Quiet Please – The New Best of Nick Lowe

With the Jones Gang

- Any Day Now (2005)

== See also ==
- List of British blues musicians
- List of blues rock musicians
- List of guitarists
- List of people from Brent
- List of people from Camden
