= Heart Strings (Linda Lewis album) =

Studio album by Linda Lewis
- Released: 1974
- Genre: Soul, rhythm and blues
- Label: Reprise
- Producer: Jim Cregan, Tony Silvester and Bert DeCoteaux

Linda Lewis chronology
Not a Little Girl Anymore (1973)	Heart Strings (1974)	Woman Overboard (1977)

Heart Strings is an album by British singer-songwriter Linda Lewis. It was her last album with Reprise Records.

This album is essentially a compilation which includes tracks from her first three solo records Reprise label releases and also includes three tracks that were only otherwise available on singles: "Safe and Sound," "Sideway Shuffle" and "Rock a Doodle Do". The record was released following Lewis' departure to Arista Records, but before her hit "It's in His Kiss".

== Track listing ==
=== Side 1 ===
1. "Sideway Shuffle" – March 1974 single
2. "Old Smokey" – from the Lark album
3. "We Can Win" – from the Say No More album
4. "I'm In Love Again" – from the Fathoms Deep album
5. "Reach For The Truth" – from the Lark album

=== Side 2 ===
1. "Rock A Doodle Doo" – June 1973 single
2. "On The Stage" – from the Fathoms Deep album
3. "Fathoms Deep" – from the Fathoms Deep album
4. "Safe And Sound" – b-side of "Sideway Shuffle"
5. "I Dunno" – from the Say No More album

== Credits ==
- Engineer – Ken Scott, Phil McDonald
- Producer – Jim Cregan (tracks: A1, A2, A4 to B5)
- Lyrics – Linda Lewis

== Notes ==
Tracks A2 and A5 from Lark LP. Tracks A4, B2 and B3 from Fathoms Deep LP.
