= Blondes 'Ave More Fun Tour =

1978–79 concert tour by Rod Stewart

- Tour by Rod Stewart
- Poster to the concerts in Richfield, Ohio
- Location: North America; Europe; Japan; Australia
- Associated album: Blondes Have More Fun
- Start date: 20 November 1978
- End date: 28 June 1979
- Legs: 4
- No. of shows: 89

Rod Stewart concert chronology
- Foot Loose & Fancy Free Tour (1977); Blondes 'Ave More Fun Tour (1978–1979); Foolish Behaviour Tour (1980–1981)

The Blondes 'Ave More Fun Tour was a worldwide concert tour held by British singer-songwriter Rod Stewart to promote his album Blondes Have More Fun. The tour began on 20 November 1978 in Paris and ended on 28 June 1979 in Los Angeles, California.

== Tour dates ==
Date	City	Country	Venue
Europe
20 November 1978	Paris	France	Pavillon de Paris
21 November 1978	Brussels	Belgium	Forest National
22 November 1978	Rotterdam	Netherlands	Ahoy Rotterdam
24 November 1978	Stockholm	Sweden	Johanneshovs Isstadion
25 November 1978	Gothenburg	Sweden	Scandinavium
27 November 1978	Oslo	Norway	Ekeberghallen
28 November 1978	Copenhagen	Denmark	Falkoner Teatret
2 December 1978	Manchester	England	Kings Hall
3 December 1978	Manchester	England	Kings Hall
5 December 1978	Manchester	England	Kings Hall
6 December 1978	Manchester	England	Kings Hall
8 December 1978	Leicester	England	Granby Halls
9 December 1978	Leicester	England	Granby Halls
11 December 1978	Brighton	England	Brighton Centre
12 December 1978	Brighton	England	Brighton Centre
13 December 1978	Brighton	England	Brighton Centre
16 December 1978	Birmingham	England	National Exhibition Centre
17 December 1978	Birmingham	England	National Exhibition Centre
21 December 1978	London	England	Olympia London
22 December 1978	London	England	Olympia London
23 December 1978	London	England	Olympia London
28 December 1978	London	England	Olympia London
29 December 1978	London	England	Olympia London
30 December 1978	London	England	Olympia London
Oceania
31 January 1979	Perth	Australia	Perth Entertainment Centre
1 February 1979	Perth	Australia	Perth Entertainment Centre
2 February 1979	Perth	Australia	Perth Entertainment Centre
5 February 1979	Adelaide	Australia	Adelaide Oval
9 February 1979	Melbourne	Australia	VFL Park
12 February 1979	Sydney	Australia	Sydney Showgrounds
13 February 1979	Sydney	Australia	Sydney Showgrounds
16 February 1979	Brisbane	Australia	Brisbane Festival Hall
17 February 1979	Brisbane	Australia	Brisbane Festival Hall
18 February 1979	Brisbane	Australia	Brisbane Festival Hall
22 February 1979	Auckland	New Zealand	Western Springs Stadium
25 February 1979	Wellington	New Zealand	Athletic Park
27 February 1979	Christchurch	New Zealand	Lancaster Park
Asia
6 March 1979	Tokyo	Japan	Nippon Budokan
7 March 1979	Tokyo	Japan	Nippon Budokan
8 March 1979	Fukuoka	Japan	Fukuoka Kokusai Center
10 March 1979	Nagoya	Japan	Nagoya Civic Assembly Hall
11 March 1979	Osaka	Japan	Festival Hall
12 March 1979	Osaka	Japan	Festival Hall
14 March 1979	Tokyo	Japan	Nippon Budokan
15 March 1979	Tokyo	Japan	Nippon Budokan
North America
18 March 1979	Honolulu	United States	Neal S. Blaisdell Center
19 March 1979	Honolulu	United States	Neal S. Blaisdell Center
20 March 1979	Honolulu	United States	Neal S. Blaisdell Center
12 April 1979	Edmonton	Canada	Northlands Coliseum
14 April 1979	Vancouver	Canada	Pacific Coliseum
15 April 1979	Vancouver	Canada	Pacific Coliseum
17 April 1979	Denver	United States	McNichols Sports Arena
19 April 1979	San Antonio	United States	HemisFair Arena
21 April 1979	Houston	United States	The Summit
22 April 1979	Houston	United States	The Summit
24 April 1979	Birmingham	United States	Birmingham-Jefferson Civic Center
25 April 1979	Atlanta	United States	Omni Coliseum
27 April 1979	Louisville	United States	Freedom Hall
28 April 1979	Indianapolis	United States	Market Square Arena
29 April 1979	Cincinnati	United States	Riverfront Coliseum
1 May 1979	Chicago	United States	Uptown Theatre
2 May 1979	Chicago	United States	Uptown Theatre
3 May 1979	Richfield	United States	Richfield Coliseum
5 May 1979	Richfield	United States	Richfield Coliseum
6 May 1979	Toronto	Canada	Maple Leaf Gardens
7 May 1979	Toronto	Canada	Maple Leaf Gardens
9 May 1979	Montreal	Canada	Montreal Forum
11 May 1979	Detroit	United States	Cobo Arena
12 May 1979	Detroit	United States	Cobo Arena
13 May 1979	Detroit	United States	Cobo Arena
29 May 1979	Pittsburgh	United States	Civic Arena
30 May 1979	Landover	United States	Capital Centre
1 June 1979	Providence	United States	Providence Civic Center
2 June 1979	Boston	United States	Boston Garden
4 June 1979	Philadelphia	United States	Spectrum
5 June 1979	New York City	United States	Madison Square Garden
7 June 1979	New York City	United States	Madison Square Garden
8 June 1979	New York City	United States	Madison Square Garden
9 June 1979	New York City	United States	Madison Square Garden
11 June 1979	Kansas City	United States	Kemper Arena
15 June 1979	Daly City	United States	Cow Palace
17 June 1979	Daly City	United States	Cow Palace
19 June 1979	San Diego	United States	San Diego Sports Arena
21 June 1979	Los Angeles	United States	The Forum
22 June 1979	Los Angeles	United States	The Forum
24 June 1979	Los Angeles	United States	The Forum
25 June 1979	Los Angeles	United States	The Forum
26 June 1979	Los Angeles	United States	The Forum
28 June 1979	Los Angeles	United States	The Forum

== Set list ==
1. Hot Legs
2. Born Loose
3. Tonight's The Night (Gonna Be Alright)
4. The Wild Side of Life
5. Get Back (The Beatles cover)
6. You're in My Heart (The Final Acclaim)
7. I Don't Want to Talk About It
8. (If Loving You Is Wrong) I Don't Want to Be Right (Luther Ingram cover)
9. Blondes (Have More Fun)
10. Da Ya Think I'm Sexy?
11. I Just Want to Make Love to You (Willie Dixon cover)
12. The Killing of Georgie (Parts I & II)
13. Maggie May
14. (I Know) I'm Losing You (The Temptations cover)
15. Sweet Little Rock And Roller (Chuck Berry cover)
16. Sailing (Sutherland Brothers cover)

Encore

1. Twistin' the Night Away (Sam Cooke cover)
2. You Wear It Well

== Personnel ==
- Rod Stewart – vocals and harmonica
- Gary Grainger – guitars
- Billy Peek – guitars and vocals
- Jim Cregan – guitars and vocals
- Phil Chen – bass and vocals
- Carmine Appice – drums
- Kevin Savigar – keyboards
- Phil Kenzie – horns
