= Absolutely Live (Rod Stewart album) =

Live album by Rod Stewart
- Released: November 1982
- Venues: The Forum, Los Angeles; Long Beach Arena; San Diego Sports Arena, California; Wembley Arena, London; The NEC, Birmingham, England
- Genres: Rock, pop, folk rock
- Length: 84:26 LP; 75:36 CD
- Label: Warner Bros.
- Producer: Rod Stewart

Rod Stewart chronology
Tonight I'm Yours (1981)	Absolutely Live (1982)	Body Wishes (1983)

Professional ratings
Review scores
Source	Rating
AllMusic	1/5 stars
Rolling Stone	3/5 stars

Absolutely Live is a live album by musician Rod Stewart. It was released as a double–LP in 1982. The subsequent CD version omitted the tracks "The Great Pretender" and "Guess I'll Always Love You" in order to fit the album onto a single disc. The liner notes state that there are no overdubs on this live album.

== Track listing ==
Side A

1. "The Stripper" – 0:10
2. "Tonight I'm Yours (Don't Hurt Me)" – 4:10
3. "Sweet Little Rock and Roller" – 4:25
4. "Hot Legs" – 4:52
5. "Tonight's the Night (Gonna Be Alright)" – 4:23
6. "The Great Pretender" – 3:34

Side B

1. "Passion" – 5:04
2. "She Won't Dance with Me / Little Queenie" – 4:34
3. "You're in My Heart (The Final Acclaim)" – 4:34
4. "Rock My Plimsoul" – 4:24

Side C

1. "Young Turks" – 5:28
2. "Guess I'll Always Love You" – 4:51
3. "Gasoline Alley" – 2:15
4. "Maggie May" – 5:08
5. "Tear It Up" – 3:26

Side D

1. "Da Ya Think I'm Sexy?" – 6:04
2. "Sailing" – 4:45
3. "I Don't Want to Talk About It" – 4:34
4. "Stay with Me" – 5:34

== Personnel ==
Band members

- Rod Stewart – vocals, producer, mixing
- Jim Cregan – guitars, backing vocals, mixing
- Robin Le Mesurier – guitars, backing vocals
- Wally Stocker – guitars
- Kevin Savigar – piano, keyboards, backing vocals
- Jimmy Zavala – harmonicas, saxophones, keyboards, bells
- Jay Davis – bass, backing vocals
- Tony Brock – drums

Guest musicians

- Kim Carnes, Tina Turner – vocals on "Stay with Me"

Production

- George Tutko – engineer, mixing
- Ricky DeLena – assistant engineer

== Charts ==
Chart (1982)	Peak position
Australian Albums (Kent Music Report)	41
