= Tonight I'm Yours (Don't Hurt Me) =

Single by Rod Stewart

from the album Tonight I'm Yours
- B-side: "Tora, Tora, Tora (Out with the Boys)"
- Released: 2 October 1981 (UK)
- Recorded: 1981
- Genre: Synth-pop; new wave
- Length: 4:09
- Label: Warner Bros.
- Songwriters: Rod Stewart, Jim Cregan, Kevin Savigar
- Producers: Jim Cregan, Rod Stewart

Rod Stewart singles chronology
"Gi' Me Wings" (1981)	"Tonight I'm Yours (Don't Hurt Me)" (1981)	"Young Turks" (1981)

Music video
- "Tonight I'm Yours (Don't Hurt Me)" on YouTube

"Tonight I'm Yours (Don't Hurt Me)" is a song by Rod Stewart, the title track of his 1981 album Tonight I'm Yours. It was one of three singles released from the album. The song was the lead single internationally except for the United States, where it was the follow-up to "Young Turks."

Billboard called it an "uptempo, highly melodic outing" and praised Stewart's vocal and the song's hooks. Record World said that "keyboard chimes and percolating percussion decorate the energetic dance beat."

"Tonight I'm Yours" became an international top 10 hit, peaking at number eight in the UK and number two in Canada. It reached the top 20 in the US.

A promotional video for the song was filmed at the Sunset Marquis Hotel in West Hollywood, California. Directed by Russell Mulcahy, it features Stewart performing poolside while women are partying throughout the hotel.

== Personnel ==
- Rod Stewart – lead vocals and backing vocals
- Jim Cregan – lead guitar
- Jeff Baxter – additional guitar
- Jay Davis – bass
- Kevin Savigar – keyboards
- Duane Hitchings – keyboards
- Carmine Appice – Linn LM-1 programming
- Tony Brock – percussion
- Tommy Vig – tubular bells
- Linda Lewis – backing vocals

== Charts ==
=== Weekly charts ===
Chart (1981–1982)	Peak position
Australia (Kent Music Report)	6
Belgium (Ultratop 50 Flanders)	5
Canada Top Singles (RPM)	2
Ireland (IRMA)	8
Netherlands (Single Top 100)	16
Norway (VG-lista)	4
Sweden (Sverigetopplistan)	10
Switzerland (Schweizer Hitparade)	9
UK Singles (Official Charts)	8
US Billboard Hot 100	20
US Mainstream Rock (Billboard)	29
US Cash Box	15
West Germany (GfK)	50

=== Year-end charts ===
Chart (1982)	Rank
Australia (Kent Music Report)	55
Canada RPM Top Singles	28
US Cash Box	98

== Certifications and sales ==
Region	Certification	Certified units/sales
Australia (ARIA)	Gold	50,000^{^}
^{^} Shipments figures based on certification alone.
