= Tonight I'm Yours =

Studio album by Rod Stewart
- Released: 6 November 1981
- Recorded: November 1980 – June 1981
- Studios: Record Plant (Los Angeles, California)
- Genres: Soft rock; new wave; synth pop
- Length: 41:29
- Labels: Warner Bros.; Riva
- Producers: Jim Cregan; Rod Stewart

Rod Stewart chronology
Foolish Behaviour (1980)	Tonight I'm Yours (1981)	Absolutely Live (1982)

Singles from Tonight I'm Yours
- 1. "Tonight I'm Yours (Don't Hurt Me)" Released: October 1981 (UK); 2. "Young Turks" Released: October 1981 (US); 3. "How Long" Released: February 1982; 4. "Just Like a Woman" Released: March 1982 (EU)

Tonight I'm Yours is the eleventh studio album by Rod Stewart, released in 1981. It features elements of classic rock, pop and new wave. The album spawned three hit singles: the title track "Tonight I'm Yours (Don't Hurt Me)" (US Billboard No. 20, US Cash Box No. 15; Canada No. 2), "Young Turks" (US No. 5), and "How Long" (US No. 49).

== Production ==
Tonight I'm Yours saw Rod Stewart further adopting current musical trends, after some disco-influenced songs on Blondes Have More Fun and Foolish Behaviour, by adding elements of synth-pop and new wave to the title track and "Young Turks". The album included three covers: "Tear It Up", "How Long", and "Just Like a Woman".

The song "Never Give Up on a Dream" was dedicated to Canadian athlete Terry Fox, who ran 3,339 miles with one prosthetic leg in the Marathon of Hope to raise money for cancer research. Fox succumbed to cancer in 1981, the year the album was released.

The music video for "Tonight I'm Yours" was shot by Australian film director Russell Mulcahy.

== Critical reception ==
Professional ratings
Review scores
Source	Rating
AllMusic	4/5 stars
Robert Christgau	B
Rolling Stone	4/5 stars

The album was generally well received, receiving four out of five stars in both Rolling Stone's contemporary review and in a retrospective from AllMusic.

== Track listing ==
No.	Title	Writer(s)	Length
1.	"Tonight I'm Yours (Don't Hurt Me)"	Stewart, Jim Cregan, Kevin Savigar	4:09
2.	"How Long"	Paul Carrack	4:12
3.	"Tora, Tora, Tora (Out with the Boys)"	Stewart	4:29
4.	"Tear It Up"	Dorsey Burnette, Johnny Burnette, David Burlinson	2:29
5.	"Only a Boy"	Stewart, Cregan, Savigar	4:09
6.	"Just Like a Woman"	Bob Dylan	3:55
7.	"Jealous"	Stewart, Carmine Appice, Jay Davis, Danny Johnson	4:30
8.	"Sonny"	Stewart, Cregan, Savigar, Bernie Taupin	4:01
9.	"Young Turks"	Stewart, Appice, Duane Hitchings, Savigar	5:04
10.	"Never Give Up on a Dream"	Stewart, Cregan, Taupin	4:20
Total length:			41:34

== Personnel ==
- Rod Stewart – lead vocals, backing vocals (3)
- Kevin Savigar – synthesizers
- Duane Hitchings – synthesizers and clavinet (1, 9)
- Jim Cregan – guitars, backing vocals (2, 3, 5, 9)
- Jeff Baxter – additional guitar (1), pedal steel guitar (6)
- Robin Le Mesurier – guitars (2–6, 8, 10)
- Danny Johnson – guitars (7)
- Jay Davis – bass (except 9)
- Carmine Appice – snare drum (1), backing vocals (2, 5, 9), drum machine (9) and hi-hat (9)
- Tony Brock – percussion (1), drums (2–8, 10), backing vocals (2, 3, 5), tambourine (10)
- Tommy Vig – tubular bells (1)
- Paulinho da Costa – percussion (7)
- Jimmy Zavala – saxophone (3), harmonica (7)
- Byron Berline – fiddle (5)
- Linda Lewis – female vocal (1)
- Penny Jones – vocal soloist (10)
- The Pentecostal Community Choir – choir (10)
- Keith Pringle – choir director (10)

Production

- Rod Stewart – producer
- Jim Cregan – co-producer, mixing
- George Tutko – engineer, mixing
- Ricky Charles Delena – assistant engineer
- Larry Emerine – mastering
- Stephen Marcussen – mastering
- Precision Lacquer (Hollywood, California) – mastering location
- Malcolm Cullimore – album coordinator
- Richard Seireeni – art direction
- Raul Vega – photography

== Charts ==
=== Weekly charts ===
Chart (1981–1982)	Peak position
Australian Albums (Kent Music Report)	11
Dutch Albums (Album Top 100)	12
German Albums (Offizielle Top 100)	42
New Zealand Albums (RMNZ)	4
Norwegian Albums (VG-lista)	20
Swedish Albums (Sverigetopplistan)	2
UK Albums (Official Charts)	8
US Billboard 200	11

=== Year-end charts ===
Chart (1982)	Position
Dutch Albums (Album Top 100)	97
US Billboard 200	47

== Certifications ==
Region	Certification	Certified units/sales
Australia (ARIA)	Platinum	50,000^{^}
Canada (Music Canada)	2× Platinum	200,000^{^}
Hong Kong (IFPI Hong Kong)	Platinum	20,000^{*}
United Kingdom (BPI)	Gold	100,000^{^}
United States (RIAA)	Platinum	1,000,000^{^}
^{*} Sales figures based on certification alone.^{^} Shipments figures based on certification alone.
