= Bruce Gowers =

British television director and producer (1940–2023)

- Born: 21 December 1940; West Kilbride, Ayrshire, Scotland
- Died: 15 January 2023 (aged 82); Santa Monica, California, U.S.
- Occupations: Television director, producer
- Website: brucegowers.com

Bruce Gowers (21 December 1940 – 15 January 2023) was a British television director and producer, best known for his work on large-scale live music and event productions.

== Life and career ==
Gowers was born in West Kilbride, Ayrshire, Scotland on 21 December 1940. He started his career in his native United Kingdom, where his music video for Queen's "Bohemian Rhapsody" brought him international recognition, leading to his relocation to the United States in the late 1970s.

His career included credits for the live episodes of American Idol (2001–2010) which he directed from its inception, and awards shows including the Emmys, the MTV Video Music Awards, the Billboard Awards, and the American Music Awards, event specials including Live Earth, Live 8, and President Bill Clinton's Inaugural Concert at the Lincoln Memorial. He also directed musical specials for Michael Jackson and the Jacksons, the Rolling Stones, Ray Charles, Paul McCartney, Rod Stewart, and Britney Spears.

Gowers died of an acute respiratory infection in Santa Monica, California, on 15 January 2023, at the age of 82.

== Television series ==
Music

- American Idol (FOX) 2002–2007, 2009–2010

2009 Emmy Award Winner – Best Musical Variety Director. 5 Emmy Award nominations, DGA Award nominee

- Celebrity Duets (FOX) 2006
- Your Mama Don't Dance (Lifetime) 2008
- So You Think You Can Dance (Fox) 2005
- Pepsi Smash (WB) 2004
- Big Break (Syndication) 1990
- Dancin' to the Hits (Syndication) 30 episodes 1986–1987
- Dick Clark Live (CBS) 1988–1989
- Solid Gold (Paramount) 1985
- Rock of the 80s (Showtime) – 1984 Ace Award Nominee
- Britt Ekland's Jukebox (Syndication) 1979

Comedy

- Whose Line Is It, Anyway? (ABC) 1998–2007
- Penn & Teller's Sin City Spectacular (F/X) 1998

Kids

- American Juniors (FOX) 2003
- All That (Nickelodeon) 1999
- The Amanda Show (Nickelodeon) 1999
- Roundhouse (Nickelodeon) 1993–1994
- The Kidsongs Television Show (called "The Kidsongs TV Show" in only season 1 (1987–1988)) (Public Television), 1987–1988, 1994–1995, 1997–1998

Misc.

- The Spectacular World of Guinness Records (Syndication) 52 episodes, 1987–1989
- This Is Your Life (NBC) 1983
- We Interrupt This Week (PBS)
- Headliners with David Frost (NBC) 1978

== Award shows ==
- The 57th & 59th Annual Primetime Emmy Awards (ABC) 2005, 2007
- People's Choice Awards (CBS) 2005–2009
- The Billboard Awards (Fox) 1995–2006
- Kids' Choice Awards (Nickelodeon & MTV Networks) 2005 - 2007, 1995, 1994
- Teen Choice Awards (Fox) 2004–2009
- Miss America (CMT) 2006, 2008
- The World Music Awards (ABC) 2005, 2004
- Tributo A Nuestros Heroes (Telemundo Network) 2004
- Spike Video Game Awards (Spike TV) 2004
- The American Music Awards (ABC) 2003, 2002, 2001
- The Blockbuster Awards (UPN) 1996–2001
- Academy of Country Music Awards (CBS) 2002, 2001
- MTV Movie Awards 1992–2002
- The 72nd Annual Academy Awards Pre-Show (ABC) 2002, 2000
- Muhammad Ali 60th Birthday Celebration (CBS) 2002
- My VH1 Awards (VH1) 2000
- The MTV Video Music Awards (MTV & Syndication) 2000, 1995–1994, 1992–1988—Winner of the 1990 Monitor Award for Best Director, multiple Ace & Monitor Award nominations
- The Essence Awards (CBS & Fox) 1997, 1996, 1995, 1994, 1993 & 1992—1995 NAACP Image Award for Best Special
- The ESPY Awards (ESPN, ABC) 1997, 1996 & 1995
- The American Comedy Awards (ABC) 2000, 1999, 1998 & 1995
- The AFI Salutes... (ABC) 2000, 1999
- MTV's Fashionably Loud (MTV) 1998, 1997, 1996 & 1995
- VH1 Fashion Awards (VH1) 1998, 1997 & 1996
- 1998 Skate, Rattle and Roll Championships (Fox) 1998
- VH1 Honors (VH1) 1995, 1994
- MTV European Music Awards (MTV) 1996, 1995, 1994
- All Star Pro Sports Awards (ABC) 1990
- American Video Awards (ABC) 1983, 1985–1986

== Television specials ==
Music

- Michael Jackson: 30th Anniversary Celebration, The Solo Years (CBS) 2001
- Dick Clark's New Year's Rockin' Eve (ABC) 2007, 2008
- I Walk the Line: A Night for Johnny Cash (CBS) 2005
- An All-Star Salute to Patti LaBelle: Live From Atlantis (UPN) 2005
- Live 8 Philadelphia (MTV/VH1, ABC) 2005
- Genius: A Night for Ray Charles (CBS) 2004 – Winner of the 2004 DGA Award for Best Musical Variety Director. Emmy Award Nominee, Best Director
- Prince Musicology (PPV) 2004
- Ultimate Manilow (CBS) 2002
- All Star Tribute to Brian Wilson (TNT) 2001
- NSYNC - Atlantis Concert 2001
- Women Rock: Girls with Guitars (Lifetime) 2001, 2000
- Experience Music Project (VH1) 2000 (2 nights)
- Arista's 25th Anniversary (NBC) 2000
- Sarah Brightman: La Luna Concert (PBS) 2000
- Britney Spears in Hawaii (FOX) 2000
- Britney Spears: There's No Place Like Home (FOX) 2000
- A Home for the Holidays (CBS) 2001, 2000
- Radio City Grand Re-Opening (FOX) 1999
- Ricky Martin: One Night Only (CBS) 1999
- American Express Concert in Central Park (UPN) 1999
- L'Oreal Summer Music Mania (UPN) 1999
- Fleetwood Mac: The Dance (MTV) 1997 B DGA & EMMY Nominee for Best Director
- Rolling Stones: Bridges to Babylon (Pay Per View) 1997
- Woodstock (Pay Per View) 1994
- An American Reunion: The Lincoln Memorial Inaugural Concert (HBO) 1993
- MTV'S Inaugural Gala Ball (MTV) 1993
- Up-close: Paul McCartney (MTV & ABC) 1993
- Rod Stewart Valentine Vagabond (Live Pay Per View Concert) 1992
- Dwight Yoakam (Live Pay Per View Concert) 1991
- MTV Unplugged With Paul McCartney (MTV) 1991—Ace Award Nominee
- Arista's 15th Anniversary "That's What Friends Are For" (CBS) 1990
- Huey Lewis and the News (Showtime) 1985—Grammy Award winner for Best Director
- Men at Work "Live in San Francisco" (HBO) 1984—Monitor Award winner
- Soul Session: James Brown & Friends (Cinemax) – 1987 Ace Award for Best Director
- Harry Belafonte: Don't Stop the Carnival (HBO) 1985
- The Doobie Brothers Farewell Concert (Showtime) 1985
- Rod Stewart, Tonight He's Yours (Syndication) 1981
- Legends of Rock 'N Roll (Cinemax) 1989

Comedy

- 3 Cats From Miami (HBO) 1998
- Rodney Dangerfield's 75th Birthday Toast (HBO) 1997
- Paula Poundstone Goes to Harvard (HBO) 1995
- TV's All Time Classic Comedy (Fox) 1994
- Dame Edna's Hollywood I, II & III (NBC) (Three 1 Hour Specials) 1992, 1991
- Paul Rodriguez Special (Fox) 1992
- The 14th Annual Young Comedians Show (HBO) 1991 with Richard Lewis
- Paula Poundstone: Cats, Cops and Stuff (HBO) 1990 – Ace Award nominee 1991
- Richard Lewis "I'm Doomed" (HBO) 1990 – Ace Award nominee 1990
- Harry Anderson's Sideshow (NBC) 1987
- This Is Your Life, 30th Anniversary Special (NBC) 1987
- Richard Lewis: "I'm Exhausted" (HBO) 1988
- George Carlin's "What Am I Doing in New Jersey?" (HBO) 1988
- The 11th Annual Young Comedian's Special (HBO) 1988
- Robin Williams, an Evening at The Met (HBO) – 1988 Monitor Award nominee and 1987 Ace Award nominee, both for Best Director
- Harry Anderson "Hello Sucker" (Showtime) 1986
- Jerry Seinfeld Special (HBO) 1987
- Greater Tuna (HBO) 1984—Monitor Award Winner for Best Cable Program, Ace Award Nominee for Best Director
- Billy Crystal - A Comic's Line (HBO) 1984
- Richard Belzer Caught in the Act (Cinemax) 1984
- Eddie Murphy Delirious (HBO) 1983

Miscellaneous specials

- Explosion! (ABC) 1997
- City Kids All-star Celebration (ABC) 1995
- World of Entertainment (Syndication) 1982
- All-Star Salute to Mother's Day (NBC) 1981
- The II, III, IV & V International Guinness Book of World Records (ABC)
- David Frost with The Shah of Iran (ABC) 1980

== Videos ==
Selected music videos directed by Bruce Gowers:

Year	Song	Artist	Notes
1973	"Keep Yourself Alive"	Queen	
1973	"Liar"	Queen	
1975	"Bohemian Rhapsody"	Queen	
1975	"I'm Not in Love"	10cc	
1975	"In Dulce Jubilo"	Mike Oldfield	
1976	"You're My Best Friend"	Queen	
1976	"Somebody to Love"	Queen	
1976	"Robbery, Assault, and Battery"	Genesis	
1976	"Ripples..."	Genesis	
1976	"A Trick of the Tail"	Genesis	
1976	"I'm Mandy Fly Me"	10cc	
1976	"Rockaria!"	Electric Light Orchestra	
1976	"Hot Stuff"	The Rolling Stones	
1976	"Hey Negrita"	The Rolling Stones	
1976	"Fool to Cry"	The Rolling Stones	
1976	"The Killing of Georgie"	Rod Stewart	
1976	"Tonight's the Night (Gonna Be Alright)"	Rod Stewart	
1977	"The First Cut Is the Deepest"	Rod Stewart	
1977	"Tie Your Mother Down"	Queen	
1977	"How Much Love"	Leo Sayer	
1977	"Stayin' Alive"	The Bee Gees	
1977	"How Deep is Your Love"	The Bee Gees	
1977	"You're Insane"	Rod Stewart	
1977	"You're in My Heart (The Final Acclaim)"	Rod Stewart	
1978	"I Was Only Joking"	Rod Stewart	
1978	"Hot Legs"	Rod Stewart	
1978	"Baby Come Back"	Player	
1978	"Emotion"	Samantha Sang	
1978	"Dust in the Wind"	Kansas	
1978	"Lights"	Journey	
1978	"Life Beyond L.A."	Ambrosia	
1978	"How Much I Feel"	Ambrosia	
1978	"I'm Every Woman"	Chaka Khan	
1978	"How You Gonna See Me Now"	Alice Cooper	
1978	"Blue Collar Man (Long Nights)"	Styx	
1978	"Sing for the Day"	Styx	
1978	"I'm OK"	Styx	
1978	"I Love the Nightlife"	Alicia Bridges	
1978	"Love Don't Live Here Anymore"	Rose Royce	
1978	"Reunited"	Peaches & Herb	
1978	"Da Ya Think I'm Sexy?"	Rod Stewart	
1979	"Ain't Love a Bitch"	Rod Stewart	
1979	"Blondes (Have More Fun)"	Rod Stewart	
1979	"Lovin', Touchin', Squeezin'"	Journey	
1979	"Lovin' You is Easy"	Journey	
1979	"Just the Same Way"	Journey	
1979	"Turn Me On"	The Tubes	
1979	"TV is King"	The Tubes	
1979	"Prime Time"	The Tubes	
1979	"The Logical Song"	Supertramp	
1979	"Goodbye Stranger"	Supertramp	
1979	"Breakfast in America"	Supertramp	
1979	"La dolce Vita"	Sparks	
1979	"The Number One Song in Heaven"	Sparks	
1979	"Dancing Jones"	Nicolette Larson	
1979	"Small Paradise"	John Cougar	
1979	"I Need a Lover"	John Cougar	
1979	"Miami"	John Cougar	
1979	"99"	Toto	
1979	"Rock with You"	Michael Jackson	
1980	"She's Out of My Life"	Michael Jackson	
1980	"Hydra"	Toto	
1980	"St. George and the Dragon"	Toto	
1980	"All Us Boys"	Toto	
1980	"Ride Like the Wind"	Christopher Cross	
1980	"This Time"	John Cougar	
1981	"Ain't Even Done with the Night"	John Cougar	
1981	"Tom Sawyer"	Rush	
1981	"Vital Signs"	Rush	
1981	"Limelight"	Rush	
1981	"Controversy"	Prince	
1981	"Sexuality"	Prince	
1981	"Nightwalker"	Gino Vannelli	
1981	"Winning"	Santana	
1981	"Searchin'"	Santana	
1981	"I Love You Too Much"	Santana	
1981	"E Papa Re"	Santana	
1981	"Changes"	Santana	
1981	"Over and Over"	Santana	
1981	"A World Without Heroes"	Kiss	
1982	"I"	Kiss	
1982	"Keep the Fire Burnin'"	REO Speedwagon	
1982	"Sweet Time"	REO Speedwagon	
1982	"Girl With the Heart of Gold"	REO Speedwagon	
1982	"I'll Follow You"	REO Speedwagon	
1982	"The Key"	REO Speedwagon	
1982	"Back in My Heart Again"	REO Speedwagon	
1982	"Stillness of the Night"	REO Speedwagon	
1982	"Good Trouble"	REO Speedwagon	
1982	"1999"	Prince	
1982	"Jack and Diane"	John Cougar	
1982	"Hurts So Good"	John Cougar	
1983	"Waiting for Your Love"	Toto	
1984	"The Heart of Rock & Roll"	Huey Lewis and the News	
1984	"I Don't Want to Talk About It"	Rod Stewart	
1987	"In My Dreams"	REO Speedwagon	
1993	"People Everyday"	Arrested Development	
1996	"Why Does It Hurt So Bad"	Whitney Houston	
2005	"(Is This the Way to) Amarillo"	Tony Christie and Peter Kay	

== Filmography ==
=== Documentaries ===
- Hello Dalí (1973)
- Finnan Games (1975)

=== Television pilots ===
- George Lopez Talk Show (WAD Productions) 2008
- Glam Me Up (CW Network) 2008
- Roundhouse (Nickelodeon) 1992
- America's Funniest People (ABC) 1990
- The Kidsongs TV Show (Syndication) 1988
- Dancin' to The Hits (Syndication) 1986
- Footlight Follies 1988
- Double Takes 1987

== Awards ==
Grammy Award winner:

- Huey Lewis and the News (Showtime) 1985 – Best Director long form music video

Emmy Award winner :

- American Idol (FOX) 2009 – Best Musical Variety Director
- Hello Dalí (1973) – Documentary Director
- The 4th International Guinness Book of World Records; (1982) – Editor

Emmy nominations: American Idol (2006, 2007), Genius: A Night for Ray Charles (2004), Fleetwood Mac: The Dance (1997)

DGA Award winner:

- Genius: A Night for Ray Charles (CBS) 2004 – Best Musical Variety Director

DGA Award nominations: American Idol (2006), Fleetwood Mac: The Dance (1997)

Ace Award winner:

- Soul Session: James Brown & Friends (Cinemax) – 1987 Best Director
- Greater Tuna (HBO) 1984 Best Director

Monitor Award winner:

- Men at Work "Live in San Francisco" (HBO) 1984 Best Director
- The MTV Video Music Awards (MTV & Syndication) 1990 Best Director

Monitor Award nominations: The MTV Video Music Awards, Robin Williams: An Evening at The Met (HBO) 1988, The Kidsongs TV Show (PBS) 1988

NAACP Image Award winner:

- The Essence Awards 1995: Best Special

Golden Harp Award winner: Finnan Games

== See also ==
- Music videos directed by Bruce Gowers
- Kidsongs
