= A Tear and a Smile =

A Tear and a Smile may refer to:

- A Tear and a Smile, a book by Kahlil Gibran, first published in Arabic, 1914
- A Tear and a Smile (Tír na nÓg album), 1972
- A Tear and a Smile (Linda Lewis album), 1982
