= Lark (album) =

Studio album by Linda Lewis
- Released: 1 October 1972
- Recorded: Apple Studio, London
- Genres: Soul, rhythm and blues, folk
- Length: 40:05 (original 1972 version) / 43:31 (1973 re-release)
- Label: Reprise
- Producers: Linda Lewis, Jim Cregan

Linda Lewis chronology
Say No More (1971)	Lark (1972)	Fathoms Deep (1973)

Lark is the second studio album released by British singer songwriter Linda Lewis. It was recorded at Apple studio for Reprise Records and released in 1972. It was re-released in 1973 with the hit single Rock A Doodle Do added as the first track of side 2 of the LP.

The cover was designed by English art director John Kosh with photography by Peter Howe.

== Reception ==
Professional ratings
Review scores
Source	Rating
AllMusic	4/5 stars
Christgau's Record Guide	B−

In June 2015 Rolling Stone included Lark on their list of 20 R&B Albums Rolling Stone Loved in the 1970s You Never Heard. They describe it as "an unusual type of soul music: stripped down, accompanying herself on acoustic guitar and piano, casual, "a delight."

In 1973 Rolling Stone critic Vince Aletti wrote "Linda Lewis has this very strange voice. It's like a little girl's: high, with a breathy sort of purity, full of recklessness and wit. But it also has an unexpectedly rough texture which cuts into the little-girl quality so that, while she sounds like no one else, there are moments when she feels like early Stevie Wonder crossed with Michael Jackson – an extraordinary combination.

In April 2015 Gilles Peterson rated Lark at number 77 of his top 100 Albums that every Gilles Peterson fan should have. He described the album as "bold, dramatic and chilling yet smooth, soulful and comforting, this record encompasses the British musician at her best."

AllMusic's Amy Hanson reviewed Lark as "the best of Linda Lewis' early '70s output" and concludes, "the end result is an album that, even today, defines Lewis at her dramatic best – and sounds as fresh to modern ears as it did to Bowie fans back then."

Lewis performed "It's The Frame" and "What Are You Asking Me For" live on BBC Two's The Old Grey Whistle Test in April 1972.

== Track samples ==
Track 2 – "Reach for the Truth" (whole track) was sampled in "Reach Out" by Midfield General (2000).

Track 8 – "Old Smokey" (bridge) was sampled in "Go!" by Common feat. John Mayer and Kanye West (2005).

== Track listing ==
All tracks composed by Linda Lewis.

No.	Title	Length
1.	"Spring Song"	2:08
2.	"Reach for the Truth"	4:48
3.	"It's the Frame"	3:38
4.	"Feeling Feeling"	3:04
5.	"What Are You Asking Me For"	2:50
6.	"Lark"	4:31
7.	"Rock A Doodle Do" ( (Note: This song was not on the original album, but was subsequently added as the first track of side 2 of the LP in 1973.))	3:26
8.	"Old Smokey"	3:21
9.	"Gladly Give My Hand"	2:40
10.	"More Than A Fool"	3:24
11.	"Been My Best"	2:53
12.	"Waterbaby"	3:55
13.	"Little Indians"	2:53
Total length:		43:31

== Personnel ==
All personnel credits adapted from the album's sleeve notes.

- Linda Lewis – vocals, guitar, electric piano, guiro, tambourine, wind chimes

Additional musicians

- Jim Cregan – guitars
- Emile Latimer – percussion
- Pat Donaldson – bass
- Phil Chen – bass on "Rock-a-Doodle-Doo"
- Gerry Conway – drums
- Jean Roussel – Piano, electric piano, organ, marimba
- Eric Oxendine – bass
- Poli Palmer – vibes, marimba, flute
- Paul Williams – guitar
- Michael Eve – saxophone

Production

- Engineer – Phil McDonald
- Engineer (2nd) – John Barrett
- Engineer (Cutting) – Malcolm Davies
- Executive producer – Tony Gourvish
- Producer – Linda Lewis, Jim Cregan
- Written by – Linda Lewis
