= List of concerts at Adelaide Oval =

Adelaide Oval, located in Adelaide, South Australia, has regularly been host to large outdoor concerts. The first major international act to perform at the Oval was Fleetwood Mac, in 1977. Many big names have performed there since, including David Bowie, Linda Ronstadt, Kiss, Simon and Garfunkel, Paul McCartney and Wings, Madonna, Michael Jackson, Elton John, Billy Joel, Neil Diamond, Pearl Jam, AC/DC, and the Foo Fighters.

Artists who have performed at the Adelaide Oval include:

Date	Artist	Opening act(s)	Tour / Concert name	Attendance	Revenue
28 January 1977	Little River Band				
23 November 1977	Fleetwood Mac		Rumours		
11 November 1978	David Bowie	The Angels	Isolar II	45,650 / 50,000	$684,750
13 November 1978	Peter Frampton	Cold Chisel			
5 February 1979	Rod Stewart	Cold Chisel	Blondes 'Ave More Fun Tour		
18 November 1980	Kiss	Eyes	Unmasked Tour		
9 February 1983	Simon & Garfunkel		Summer Evening		
9 November 1983	David Bowie		Serious Moonlight		
1 March 1993	Paul McCartney		The New World Tour		
1 December 1993	Madonna	Peter Andre	The Girlie Show World Tour	40,000	
26 November 1996	Michael Jackson		HIStory World Tour	50,000	
18 March 1998	Elton John; Billy Joel		Face to Face	37,500	
6 December 2002	Pink		Party Tour		
2 March 2004	Fleetwood Mac		Say You Will Tour		
26 March 2005	Neil Diamond		2005 World Tour		
17 November 2009	Pearl Jam	Liam Finn & EJ Barnes; Ben Harper	Backspacer		
2 March 2010	AC/DC	Wolfmother; Calling All Cars	Black Ice World Tour	41,569	$5,396,590
5 December 2011	Foo Fighters	Tenacious D Fucked Up; Calling All Cars	Wasting Light	36,000	
25 October 2014	The Rolling Stones	Jimmy Barnes	14 On Fire	54,115	$8,906,058
21 November 2015	AC/DC	The Hives; Kingswood	Rock or Bust World Tour	50,000	
18 February 2017	Guns N' Roses	Wolfmother	Not in This Lifetime...	33,713	$3,541,050
13 March 2017	Adele	–	Adele Live 2016	70,000	
26 October 2017	Midnight Oil	Bad Dreems; Spiderbait	The Great Circle	11,000	
7 March 2018	Ed Sheeran	Missy Higgins	÷ Tour	62,915	$5,103,599
25 January 2019	Phil Collins		Not Dead Yet Tour	30,000	$2,675,500
19 November 2019	U2	Noel Gallagher's High Flying Birds	The Joshua Tree Tour 2019	30,708	$2,497,877
26 February 2020	Queen + Adam Lambert		The Rhapsody Tour	42,484	$4,436,072
29 November 2022	Guns N' Roses		Guns N' Roses 2020 Tour		
7 March 2023	Ed Sheeran	Budjerah; Maisie Peters	+–=÷x Tour	59,708 / 59,708	$6,665,766
27 February 2024	Pink	Tones and I	Pink Summer Carnival		
5 November 2025	Metallica	Evanescence; Suicidal Tendencies	M72 World Tour	46,600 / 46,600	$6,000,000
5 March 2026	Ed Sheeran	Aaron Rowe; Mia Wray; Vance Joy	Loop Tour		
7 November 2026	Robbie Williams		Britpop Tour		
