= Robin Le Mesurier =

British musician (1953–2021)

Robin Mark Le Mesurier Halliley (22 March 1953 – 22 December 2021) was a British guitarist, known for his long collaborations with Rod Stewart and Johnny Hallyday, as well as for the wide-ranging nature of his musical performance, including membership of such bands as The Wombles.

== Life ==
Le Mesurier was the son of two of Britain's best-loved comedy actors, Hattie Jacques and John Le Mesurier. Le Mesurier gained a strong following during and after his appearance on Living TV's reality show Rehab (2009), in which he opened up about his battle with alcoholism.

=== Education ===
Le Mesurier was educated at Sussex House School, where he described himself as being "completely out of place", and then Westminster City School. This was also an unhappy experience and Le Mesurier was teased about his famous mother. While a teenager, he was offered a place at the Royal College of Music but turned it down.

=== Music ===
In his prime, Le Mesurier was a fan of The Faces and of guitar stars Eric Clapton, Jimi Hendrix, John Lee Hooker, Muddy Waters, and Jeff Beck. His first official band was The Reign (whose first single was written by the Yardbirds members Keith Relf and Jim McCarty). The band lasted until 1973, then Le Mesurier became the guitarist of The Wombles, Mike Batt's novelty pop band that played his music for the British children's TV show The Wombles.

At the beginning of his collaboration with Rod Stewart, Le Mesurier was mainly a guitar technician and session musician. In 1976 he signed with a record company with which Rod Stewart was associated. He toured the United States with Air Supply in 1977 as the opening act for Rod Stewart. After a period with Lion, eventually renamed The Difference, he was invited in 1980 to join the Rod Stewart group.

In 1994, he recorded two tracks on French singer Johnny Hallyday's first English-language record Rough Town. He became Hallyday's musical director, besides founding the group Farm Dogs with Bernie Taupin and Jim Cregan.

In September 2015, Le Mesurier joined Rod Stewart and Rolling Stone Ronnie Wood for the Faces reunion.

=== TV series ===
Le Mesurier appeared in a double episode of the Swiss-Italian TV series Sport Crime playing himself.

== Personal life and death ==
Le Mesurier died of lung cancer on 22 December 2021, aged 68.

== Discography ==
=== Reign ===
- 1970: "Line of Least Resistance" / "Natural Lovin' Man" (single)

=== Limey ===
- 1976: Limey
- 1977: Silver Eagle

=== Lion ===
- 1980: Running All Night

=== With Ron Wood ===
- 1981: 1234

=== With Rod Stewart ===
- 1981: Tonight I'm Yours
- 1982: Absolutely Live
- 1983: Body Wishes
- 1984: Camouflage
- 1986: Every Beat of My Heart

=== Farm Dogs ===
- 1996: Last Stand in Open Country
- 1998: Immigrant Sons

=== With Johnny Hallyday ===
- 1994: Rough Town
- 1994: À La Cigale (inédit, sortie en 2003)
- 1996: Lorada Tour
- 1996: Destination Vegas
- 1996: Live at the Aladdin Theatre (inédit, sortie en 2003)
- 1998: Stade de France 98 Johnny allume le feu
- 1999: Sang pour sang
- 2000: 100% Johnny: Live à la tour Eiffel
- 2000: Olympia 2000
- 2000: Good Rockin' Tonight The Legacy of Sun Records
- 2003: Parc des Princes 2003
- 2006: Flashback tour: Palais des sports 2006
- 2007: Le Cœur d'un homme
- 2007: La Cigale: 12-17 décembre 2006
- 2009: Tour 66: Stade de France 2009
- 2013: On Stage
- 2013: Born Rocker Tour
- 2014: Rester vivant
- 2016: Rester Vivant Tour
