= Rough Town =

Studio album by Johnny Hallyday
- Released: September 1994
- Recorded: 1994
- Genre: Pop, rock
- Label: Universal Music
- Producer: Chris Kimsey

Johnny Hallyday chronology
Parc des Princes (1993)	Rough Town (1994)	À La Cigale (1994)

Singles from Rough Town
- 1. "I Wanna Make Love to You" Released: September 1994; 2. "Love Affair" Released: February 1995

Rough Town is a 1994 album recorded by French singer Johnny Hallyday. It is entirely written in English to win over the anglophone countries, with the title track written by Bryan Adams. It was released in September 1994 and achieved success in France, where it debuted at the top of the charts on 2 October 1994, but dropped just after and stayed for nine weeks on the top 50 chart. It provided two singles in France, "I Wanna Make Love To You" (#18) and "Love Affair" (#35), a duet with Kathy Mattea. The album was also released in Germany, but was unsuccessful in this country. The video for "Love Affair" was directed by Dani Jacobs, filmed in Nashville and features Johnny and Kathy Mattea who duets on this track. Rough Town is Johnny Hallyday's ever last album in foreign language.

== Track listing ==
1. "Fool for the Blues" (Robin Le Mesurier, Paul Rafferty) — 4:34
2. "(I Wanna) Make Love to You" (Jerry Lynn Williams) — 4:30
3. "Love Affair" (Jerry Lynn Williams) — 5:12
4. "Hurricane" (Steve Diamond) — 5:14
5. "Can't Stop Wanting You" (Paul Brady) — 4:31
6. "Are the Chances Gone" (Robin Le Mesurier, Sheppard Solomon) — 5:10
7. "Rough Town" (Bryan Adams, Jim Vallance) — 4:26
8. "Lightnin'" (Richard Guy Bailey, Simon Carman) — 5:06
9. "Dry Spell" (Daryl Burgess, Colin James) — 7:56
10. "You're Mine" (Kevin Dukes, Paul Rafferty) — 4:53
11. "Before You Change Your Mind" (Daryl Burgess) — 4:07
12. "It's a Long Way Home" (Will Jennings, Frankie Miller) — 4:08

Source : Allmusic.

== Releases ==
Date	Label	Country	Format	Catalog
1994	Ils Universal	Belgium, France, Switzerland	CD	522839
2000	Mercury	Belgium, France, Switzerland	CD	5469722

== Certifications and sales ==
Country	Certification	Date	Sales certified
France	Gold	December 21, 1994	100,000

== Charts ==
Chart (1994)	Peak position
French SNEP Albums Chart	1
