= Sunset Marquis Hotel =

Luxury hotel with recording studio, known for its musician and filmmaker clientele

- Location within Western Los Angeles

General information
- Location: 1200 Alta Loma Road, West Hollywood, Los Angeles County, California
- Coordinates: 34°5′31″N 118°22′37″W
- Owner: George and Mark Rosenthal

Other information
- Number of rooms: 152

Sunset Marquis Hotel is a luxury hotel in West Hollywood, Los Angeles County, California. It is owned by George and his son Mark Rosenthal, and located at 1200 Alta Loma Road, and situated just off the Sunset Strip. Known for its celebrity clientele, especially musicians and people in the film industry, the hotel offers 100 suites and 52 villas located on 3 1/4 acres. Cavatina, the hotel restaurant, is popular for an expansive al fresco dining area and Bar 1200 was the original Whiskey Bar. NightBird Recording Studios, a professional recording studio in the lower level of the hotel is very popular with professional musicians and many GRAMMY winning songs have been recorded here. The hotel is also home to the Morrison Hotel Gallery which features fine art photography of rock legends. As of October 2017 room rates range from $350 to $10,000 per night.

The hotel was the setting for the Rod Stewart music video “Tonight I'm Yours (Don't Hurt Me).”

== Architecture ==
The Sunset Marquis is inspired by Mediterranean style villas, with white and cream buildings and clay tile roofs. It has 152 rooms.

== Cavatina ==
The hotel restaurant is Cavatina.

== Bar 1200 ==
The bar of the hotel, known as BAR 1200, was established in 2005. It is a small bar and only accommodates about 60 people, but it is known as a hangout for musicians and celebrities. It is often visited by musicians such as Billy Gibbons, U2, Rolling Stones, Robbie Williams, John Mayer, and Aerosmith. It regularly hosts music industry and entertainment related events and parties. This is the original Whiskey Bar where Rande Gerber partnered with the Sunset Marquis to create the exclusive concept. Bar 1200 continues the legacy of appealing to the music industry and music lovers.
