= Welcome to Hungary! The Tommy Vig Orchestra 2012 Featuring David Murray =

Studio album by Tommy Vig
- Released: August 1, 2011
- Recorded: April 2011 – May 2011
- Genre: Jazz
- Length: 44:34
- Label: Klasszikus Jazz Records

Welcome to Hungary! The Tommy Vig Orchestra 2012 Featuring David Murray is a 2011 album by jazz vibraharpist Tommy Vig. It was released on the Klasszikus Jazz Records label and features performances by Vig, David Murray, Istvan Elek, Ferenc Schreck, Balazs Cserta, and Rozsa Farkas.

== Reception ==
Marcela Breton of the Jazz Journalists Association nominated the album as one of the 10 Best of 2011. JazzTalent.com's review by Dustin Garlitz states "Welcome to Hungary ! is a Bags and Trane collaboration configured for the 21st century. Tommy Vig’s Orchestra is truly outstanding on all fronts, and his arrangements are, of course, nothing less than top-notch." JazzReview.com's review by Eric Prinzing states "Many of the tunes are based on a swinging riff, recalling the classic swing bands of Benny Goodman and Count Basie. But this is just a starting point, as Vig and Murray explore each song with thoroughly modern harmony. And this is not just limited to the solos—the developmental sections of each song are as difficult and demanding as 20th century classical music, while remaining firmly in a jazz aesthetic." Scott Yanow of L.A. Jazz Scene states "The band is excellent...the Murray-Vig duets are memorable...the music is modern, swings, and will keep listeners guessing." Ron Spain of Australian Jazz Scene states "With the combined forces of the excellent musicians, the compositional strength, and all of the featured soloists, this is very modern music of a high standard that requires, even deserves, rapt attention over several plays." All About Jazz's reviews by Jerry D'Souza, Hrayr Attarian, and Jack Bowers call the album "a gem of big band swing," "a well-rounded and delightful introduction to an artist who deserves long overdue recognition as a composer, improviser and instrumentalist," and "big-band jazz [leaning] toward the more adventurous," respectively. Ken Waxman of Jazz Word states "top-flight big band." Chris Spector of Midwest Record states "Certainly music for free thinkers." D. Oscar Groomes of O's Place Jazz Magazine states "Dynamic . . . high level of musicianship.” The Jazz Journalists Association nominated the album liner notes as one of the best of 2011.

== Track listing ==
1. "Sahara" - 9:44
2. "Buddy and Solita" - 5:04
3. "Now Is The Time In Hungary!" - 6:31
4. "Rise and Shine" - 5:11
5. "In Memory of Dizzy" - 9:25
6. "In Memory of Monk" - 2:46
7. "Only You" - 3:52
8. "Vig Corn" - 3:21

All arrangements, compositions, orchestrations, and conducting by Tommy Vig

== Personnel ==
- Tommy Vig: Vibraphone, drums
- David Murray: Saxophone
- Istvan Elek: Saxophone
- Ferenc Schreck: Trombone
- Balazs Cserta: Tárogató
- Rozsa Farkas: Cimbalom
- Bela Szaloky: Trombone
- Akos Tompa: Trumpet
- Janos Hamori: Trumpet
- Peter Kovacs: Tuba
- Balazs Nagy: Saxophone
- Arpad Dennert: Saxophone
- Album cover photo: Valerie Malot
