= Young Turks (song) =

Single by Rod Stewart

from the album Tonight I'm Yours
- B-side: "Tora, Tora, Tora (Out with the Boys)"
- Released: 9 October 1981
- Recorded: 1981
- Studio: Record Plant (Los Angeles)
- Genre: Synth-pop; electropop; new wave
- Length: 5:04 (album version); 4:35 (single version)
- Label: Warner Bros.
- Songwriters: Rod Stewart; Carmine Appice; Duane Hitchings; Kevin Savigar
- Producers: Jim Cregan; Rod Stewart

Rod Stewart singles chronology
"Tonight I'm Yours (Don't Hurt Me)" (1981)	"Young Turks" (1981)	"How Long" (1982)

Music video
- "Young Turks" on YouTube

Audio
- "Young Turks" on YouTube

"Young Turks" is a song by the British singer and songwriter Rod Stewart that first appeared in 1981 on his eleventh studio album, Tonight I'm Yours. The track presented Stewart backed by a new synth-pop and new wave sound, in part influenced by acts like Devo. The term young Turk, which originates from the early 20th-century secular nationalist reform party of the same name, is slang for a rebellious youth who acts contrary to what is deemed normal by society. The phrase "young Turks" is not heard in the song, the chorus instead centering on the phrase "young hearts, be free, tonight", leading to the song frequently being known as "Young Hearts" or "Young Hearts Be Free".

The music was composed by Carmine Appice, Duane Hitchings, and Kevin Savigar, with lyrics written by Stewart. The song, which was released as the first US single (second in the UK) from Tonight I’m Yours, was produced with synthesizers and a hi-hat played over a drum machine. Billboard said that it was "the kind of song Stewart is best at: melodic, lyrical and a bit harder than a ballad." Record World said that "Stewart hitches onto a brisk beat and trades in his vocal gravel for an attractive light tenor."

On the US Billboard Hot 100, "Young Turks" debuted at No. 61 on 17 October 1981 and peaked at No. 5 from 19 December 1981 to 9 January 1982. The song peaked at No. 11 on the UK singles chart and also was a top 5 hit in Australia, Belgium and Canada. Released a few months after MTV launched, it was the first video featuring breakdancing to be played by the channel.

== Personnel ==
- Rod Stewart – lead vocals and backing vocals
- Kevin Savigar – synthesizers and clavinet
- Duane Hitchings – synthesizers
- Jim Cregan – electric guitar and backing vocals
- Carmine Appice – hi-hat, Oberheim DMX programming and backing vocals

== Music videos ==
The music video, directed by Russell Mulcahy, produced by Simon Fields and Paul Flattery and choreographed by Kenny Ortega, was filmed in the central downtown area of Los Angeles in the summer of 1981. The runaway couple ("Billy", played by Dale Pauley, and "Patti", played by E. G. Daily) mentioned in the song is juxtaposed by a group of dancers who seemingly intermix with them throughout the video. About 14 seconds after the start of the video, Billy emerges from one floor above the now long abandoned Licha's Santa Fe Grill, in reality at the northwest corner of 7th and Santa Fe Streets in Los Angeles, and descends a ladder before dropping the last few feet down to the street. A little more than one-third of the way through the song, Billy and Patti are shoved toward the entrance of the Hotel Hayward, in reality at the west corner of 6th and Spring Streets, again in Los Angeles, between a mile and a half and two miles to the northwest. The dancers eventually end up in a railway yard just to the east of the grill, to where the couple has returned and Rod Stewart is singing the last half of the song.

Stewart's videotaped rooftop performance of the song in Los Angeles (different from the aforementioned music video) appeared about one-third of the way through Dick Clark's three-hour American Bandstand 30th Anniversary Special Episode on 30 October 1981.

== Charts ==
=== Weekly charts ===
Chart (1981–1982)	Peak position
Australia (Kent Music Report)	3
Belgium (Ultratop 50 Flanders)	5
Belgium (VRT Top 30 Flanders)	4
Canada (CHUM)	1
Canada Top Singles (RPM)	2
Ireland (IRMA)	9
Israel Singles Chart	1
Italy (FIMI)	23
Netherlands (Dutch Top 40)	9
Netherlands (Single Top 100)	14
New Zealand (Recorded Music NZ)	19
South Africa (Springbok Radio)	2
UK Singles (Official Charts)	11
US Billboard Hot 100	5
US Billboard Hot Dance Club Play	63
US Billboard Top Tracks	23
US Cash Box	5
West Germany (GfK)	30

=== Year-end charts ===
Chart (1981)	Position
Canada (RPM Top 100 Singles)	57
Italy (FIMI)	90

Chart (1982)	Position
Australia (Kent Music Report)	23
Belgium (Ultratop 50 Flanders)	43
Canada (RPM Top 100 Singles)	26
South Africa (Springbok)	11
US Billboard Hot 100	48
US Cash Box	44

== Certifications ==
Certifications for "Young Turks"
Region	Certification	Certified units/sales
United Kingdom (BPI) Sales since 2004	Silver	200,000^{‡}
^{‡} Sales+streaming figures based on certification alone.
