= Foot Loose & Fancy Free =

Studio album by Rod Stewart
- Released: 4 November 1977
- Recorded: 1976–1977
- Studios: Manta Sound, Toronto, Canada; Cherokee Studios, Los Angeles; Wally Heider Studios, Los Angeles
- Genre: Rock
- Length: 44:06
- Labels: Riva, Warner Bros.
- Producer: Tom Dowd

Rod Stewart chronology
A Night on the Town (1976)	Foot Loose & Fancy Free (1977)	Blondes Have More Fun (1978)

Singles from Foot Loose & Fancy Free
- 1. "You're in My Heart (The Final Acclaim)" Released: September 1977; 2. "Hot Legs" Released: January 1978; 3. "I Was Only Joking" Released: April 1978; 4. "You Keep Me Hangin' On" Released: August 1978 (Japan)

Professional ratings
Review scores
Source	Rating
AllMusic	2/5 stars
Christgau's Record Guide	B−
Rolling Stone	(mixed)
The Rolling Stone Album Guide	3/5 stars

Foot Loose & Fancy Free is the eighth studio album by Rod Stewart, released in November 1977 on Riva Records in the UK and Warner Bros in the US.

The album is the second-to-last album of Stewart's 1970s albums, including the platinum-selling A Night on the Town. The album contains elements of hard rock ("Hot Legs"), funk rock ("You're Insane"), and progressive rock via Motown ("You Keep Me Hanging On"), as well as Stewart's usual ballads ("You're in My Heart"). "I Was Only Joking" was the third of four singles released from the album.

== Track listing ==
All tracks are written by Rod Stewart and Gary Grainger unless noted otherwise.

Side one
No.	Title	Writer(s)	Length
1.	"Hot Legs"		5:14
2.	"You're Insane"	Stewart, Phil Chen	4:48
3.	"You're in My Heart (The Final Acclaim)"	Stewart	4:30
4.	"Born Loose"	Stewart, Grainger, Jim Cregan	6:02
Total length:			20:34

Side two
No.	Title	Writer(s)	Length
1.	"You Keep Me Hangin' On" (The Supremes cover)	Brian Holland, Lamont Dozier, Eddie Holland	7:28
2.	"(If Loving You Is Wrong) I Don't Want to Be Right" (Luther Ingram cover)	Homer Banks, Carl Hampton, Raymond Jackson	5:23
3.	"You Got a Nerve"		4:59
4.	"I Was Only Joking"		6:07
Total length:			23:57

== Personnel ==
=== The Rod Stewart Group ===
- Rod Stewart – lead and backing vocals
- Gary Grainger – guitar, backing vocals
- Jim Cregan – guitar, backing vocals
- Phil Chen – bass guitar, backing vocals
- Carmine Appice – drums, backing vocals
- Billy Peek – guitar, backing vocals
- John Barlow Jarvis – keyboards, backing vocals

=== Additional personnel ===
- Fred Tackett – acoustic guitar (A3)
- Steve Cropper – guitar
- David Foster – keyboards
- Nicky Hopkins – synthesizer
- Roger Bethelmy – drums (B2)
- Paulinho Da Costa, Tommy Vig – percussion
- John Mayall – harmonica on "Born Loose"
- Phil Kenzie – saxophone
- Richard Greene – violin
- Mark Stein – background vocals on "You Keep Me Hangin' On"
- Andy Johns – background vocals, recording and mixing
- Wally Heider – engineering
- John Naslen – engineering
- Sy Potma – engineering
- Lee Hulko – mastering
- Kosh – art design and direction

== Charts ==
=== Weekly charts ===
Chart (1977–78)	Peak position
Australian Albums (Kent Music Report)	1
Canada Top Albums/CDs (RPM)	1
Dutch Albums (Album Top 100)	1
German Albums (Offizielle Top 100)	34
Japanese Albums (Oricon)	19
New Zealand Albums (RMNZ)	1
Norwegian Albums (VG-lista)	6
Swedish Albums (Sverigetopplistan)	6
UK Albums (Official Charts)	3
US Billboard 200	2

Chart (2024)	Peak position
Hungarian Physical Albums (MAHASZ)	33

=== Year-end charts ===
Chart (1977)	Peak position
Australian Albums (Kent Music Report)	10
Dutch Albums (Album Top 100)	34
New Zealand Albums (RMNZ)	10
UK Albums (OCC)	31

Chart (1978)	Peak position
Australian Albums (Kent Music Report)	16
Canada Top Albums/CDs (RPM)	13
Dutch Albums (Album Top 100)	33
New Zealand Albums (RMNZ)	16
US Billboard 200	14

== Certifications ==
Region	Certification	Certified units/sales
Australia (ARIA)	4× Platinum	280,000^{^}
Canada (Music Canada)	4× Platinum	400,000^{^}
Hong Kong (IFPI Hong Kong)	Platinum	20,000^{*}
New Zealand (RMNZ)	Platinum	15,000^{^}
United Kingdom (BPI)	Platinum	300,000^{^}
United States (RIAA)	3× Platinum	3,000,000^{^}
^{*} Sales figures based on certification alone.^{^} Shipments figures based on certification alone.
