= Hacienda View =

Studio album by Linda Lewis
- Released: 1979
- Genres: Soul, rhythm and blues
- Label: Ariola
- Producer: Mike Batt

Linda Lewis chronology
Woman Overboard (1977)	Hacienda View (1979)	A Tear and a Smile (1983)

Hacienda View is an album by the English singer Linda Lewis, released in 1979. It was Lewis' seventh album. Hacienda View was produced by Mike Batt. Lewis did not enjoy the recording sessions. Lewis supported the album with a UK tour.

The album has been re-released as a standalone CD album in Japan only, but all the tracks are included in the Linda Lewis - Legends CD box set.

== Critical reception ==
The Evening Post wrote that "Lewis moves up-market into the world of big arrangements ... and it's a successful transformation."

== Track listing ==
Side one

1. "That's Love (Habanera)"
2. "Rolling for a While"
3. "The Best Days of My Life"
4. "109, Jamaica Highway"
5. "My Aphrodisiac Is You"

Side two

1. "Beggars and Kings"
2. "I'd Be Surprisingly Good for You"
3. "It Seemed Like a Good Idea at the Time"
4. "Save the Last Dance for Me"
5. "Sleeping Like a Baby"
