= Not a Little Girl Anymore (Linda Lewis album) =

Studio album by Linda Lewis
- Released: 1975
- Studio: Apple, London; Mediasound, New York City
- Genre: Soul, rhythm and blues
- Length: 35:39
- Label: Arista
- Producer: Jim Cregan, Tony Silvester, Bert DeCoteaux

Linda Lewis chronology
Fathoms Deep (1973)	Not a Little Girl Anymore (1975)	Woman Overboard (1977)

Not a Little Girl Anymore is a studio album by English singer Linda Lewis, first released in 1975. It was Lewis’ fourth album and it peaked at number 40 in the UK album chart. The album features, along with the lighter songs such as the cover of Cat Steven’s "(Remember the Days of) The Old School Yard" and the gentle pastiche "My Grandaddy Could Reggae", more sultry numbers such as "This Time I’ll be Sweeter" and "It's in His Kiss". Her album made clear the intention of re-branding the singer, moving her towards a more adult audience.

== Track listing ==
=== Side One ===
1. "(Remember the Days of) The Old Schoolyard" – (Cat Stevens)
2. "It's in His Kiss" – (Rudy Clark)
3. "This Time I'll Be Sweeter" – (Pat Grant, Gwen Guthrie)
4. "Rock and Roller Coaster" – (Lewis)
5. "Not a Little Girl Anymore" – (David Bartlett, Emilio Castillo, Stephen Kupka)

=== Side Two ===
1. "Love Where Are You Now" – (Ian Samwell, Bobby Tench)
2. "My Grandaddy Could Reggae" – (Lewis)
3. "I Do My Best to Impress" – (Lewis)
4. "May You Never" – (John Martyn)
5. "Love, Love, Love" – (Lewis)

=== 2011 Re-master CD bonus tracks ===
1. "Walk About" - (Lewis) - B-side of "It's in His Kiss"
2. "The Seaside Song" - (Lewis) - B-side of "Rock and Roller Coaster"
3. "Cordon Blues" - (Lewis)
4. "So Many Mysteries to Find" - (Lewis)
5. "Baby I'm Yours" - (Van McCoy) - 1976 single
6. "It All Comes Back to Love" (Linda Lewis) - B-side of "Winter Wonderland"
7. "The Other Side" - (Lewis) - B-side of "Baby I'm Yours"
8. "Winter Wonderland" - (Felix Bernard, Dick Smith) - 1976 single

== Personnel ==
- Linda Lewis - vocals
- Robert Ahwai, Jeff Mironov, Jerry Friedman, Lance Quinn, Jim Cregan, Snowy White - guitar
- Bernie Holland - acoustic guitar
- Lowell George - slide guitar
- Phil Chen, Bob Babbitt, Clive Chaman - bass
- Max Middleton, Derek Smith, Duncan Mackay, Jean Roussel - keyboards
- Richard Bailey, Gerry Conway - drums
- Jack Jennings, Phil Kraus, Teddy Sommers - percussion
- Carlos Martin, Darryl Lee Que - congas
- Tower of Power - horn section; arranged by Greg Adams
- Steve Gregory - saxophone, flute
- Lenny Pickett - flute
- Anne Peacock, Linda Lewis, Capability Brown, Domino, Liza Strike - background vocals

Technical

- Bob Clearmountain, Phil McDonald, Tony Bongiovi - engineer
