= Woman Overboard =

Studio album by Linda Lewis
- Released: 1977
- Genre: Soul, rhythm and blues
- Label: Arista
- Producer: Allen Toussaint, Jim Cregan, Cat Stevens

Linda Lewis chronology
| Not a Little Girl Anymore (1975) | Woman Overboard (1977) | Hacienda View (1979) |

Woman Overboard is an album by English singer Linda Lewis, released by Arista Records in 1977.

== Track listing ==
=== Side One (Vertical) ===
1. "You Came" – (Allen Toussaint)
2. "Shining" – (Allen Toussaint)
3. "Bonfire" – (Cat Stevens)
4. "Come Back and Finish What You Started" – (Van McCoy, Joe Cobb)
5. "No. 1 Heartbreaker" – (Linda Lewis)
6. "Dreamer of Dreams" – (Allen Toussaint)

=== Side Two (Horizontal) ===
1. "Moon and I" – (W. S. Gilbert, Arthur Sullivan; new lyrics: Miller, Rost)
2. "Light Years Away" – (Linda Lewis)
3. "My Love is Here to Stay" – (Linda Lewis)
4. "My Friend the Sun" – (John Whitney, Roger Chapman)
5. "So Many Mysteries to Find" – (Linda Lewis)

=== 2011 remaster bonus tracks ===
1. "Never Been Done Before" – (Linda Lewis) – B-side of "Come Back and Finish What You Started"
2. "Flipped Over Your Love" – (Linda Lewis) – B-side of "Moon and I"
3. "Can't We Just Sit Down and Talk About It" – (Tony Macaulay) – non-album track single

== Reception ==
Writing for AllMusic, Amy Hanson said: "Although Linda Lewis' April 1977 album Woman Overboard never managed to muscle its way into the UK Albums Chart, it nevertheless further cemented the singer's place in British pop history with 11 tracks that effortlessly showcased her unique and dynamic vocal range."

Record Mirror described Woman Overboard as "an album of wonderful and varied delights".

== Personnel ==
- Linda Lewis – vocals
- Paul Batiste, Walter Harris, Jim Cregan, Ray Parker Jr., Tim Renwick, Winston Delandro, Jeff Mironov, Jerry Friedman, Lance Quinn – guitar
- Alun Davies – acoustic guitar
- Snowy White – slide guitar
- Clyde Toval, Willie Weeks, Phil Chen, Bob Babbitt – bass
- Allen Toussaint – piano
- James Booker, Jean Roussel, Max Middleton, Derek Austin, Derek Smith – keyboards
- Herman Ernest III, Ollie E. Brown, Richard Bailey – drums
- Kim Joseph, Bobbye Hall, Darryl Lee Que, Jack Jennings, Phil Kraus, Teddy Sommer – percussion
- Carlos Martin – congas
- Steve Gregory – brass
- Peter Hope Evans – harmonica
- Barry St. John, Liza Strike, Vicki Brown, Alex Brown, June D. Williams, Jim Gilstrap, John Perry, Stu Calver, Tony Rivers, Anna Peacock, Bob Barton – background vocals

== Production credits ==
- Allen Toussaint produced tracks 1, 2, 5 and 6 on Side 1
- Jim Cregan produced tracks 1–4 on Side 2 and the first two bonus tracks
- Bert DeCoteaux produced track 5 on Side 2
- Tony Macaulay produced the third bonus track
