= Fathoms Deep =

Studio album by Linda Lewis
- Released: 1973
- Genre: Soul, rhythm and blues
- Label: Raft Records, Reprise
- Producer: Jim Cregan, Linda Lewis

Linda Lewis chronology
Lark (1972)	Fathoms Deep (1973)	Not a Little Girl Anymore (1975)

Fathoms Deep is the third album by English singer Linda Lewis, released in 1973.

== Track listing ==
=== Side One ===
1. "Fathoms Deep" (Linda Lewis, Jim Cregan)
2. "I'm in Love Again" (Linda Lewis)
3. "Red Light Ladies" (Linda Lewis)
4. "If I Could" (Linda Lewis)
5. "Kingman-Tinman" (Linda Lewis)
6. "Lullabye" (Linda Lewis)

=== Side Two ===
1. "Play Around" (Linda Lewis)
2. "Wise Eyes" (Linda Lewis)
3. "Guffer" (Linda Lewis)
4. "Goodbye Joanna" (Linda Lewis)
5. "On the Stage" (Linda Lewis)
6. "Moles" (Linda Lewis)

== 2012 Re-mastered CD ==
The remastered and expanded CD has the original tracks in a different order. The song "Play Around" was added and there were three bonus tracks:

- "Sideway Shuffle" single release (Linda Lewis) B-side of "Sideway Shuffle"
- "Safe and Sound" as B-side of "Sideway Shuffle" (Jim Cregan)
- "Red Light Ladies" (acoustic demo)

== Personnel ==
- Domino, Poli Palmer - backing vocals
- Danny Thompson - double bass
- Clive Chaman, Phil Chen - bass guitar
- Conrad Isidore, Richard Bailey - drums
- Bob Tench, Lowell George, Robert Ahwai - guitar
- Jim Cregan, Linda Lewis - guitar, vocals
- Max Middleton, Steve Gregory - keyboards
- Allan Sharpe, Larry Steel - percussion
- Chris Mercer, Mick Eve - saxophone
- Ron Carthy - trumpet
- Poli Palmer - woodwind
- Del Newman - string and brass arrangements, conductor
- John Kosh- Art director and designer with Peter Howe

== External sources ==
- The Guinness Book of British Hit Albums, fifth edition 1992
- "Linda Lewis". allmusic.com.
- "Linda Lewis". discogs.com.
- Original record sleeve notes
- Sleeve notes for 2012 for BBR remastered/re-issue release
