= Tommy Vig =

American drummer (born 1938)

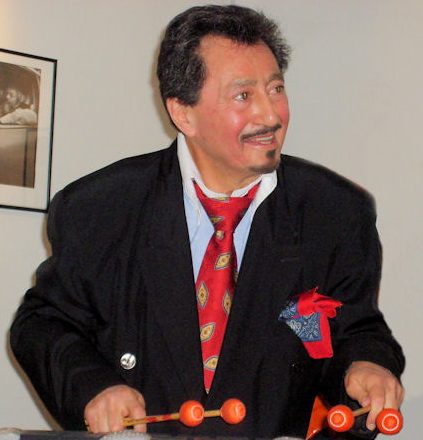
- Vig in 2009, photographed by Pethő Zsolt

Background information
- Born: 14 July 1938 (age 87)
- Origin: Budapest, Hungary
- Genres: Jazz, classical
- Occupations: Musician, composer, arranger, bandleader
- Instruments: Vibraharp, drums, percussion, xylophone, marimba
- Years active: 1940s–present
- Labels: Klasszikus Jazz, Milestone, Discovery, Tom Tom, Pannon Jazz, Dobre, Mortney, Take V, Luz
- Website: tommyvig.com

Tommy Vig (born July 14, 1938) is a percussionist, arranger, bandleader, and composer.

== Life and work ==
Since 2006, Vig has lived with his wife Mia (of The Kim Sisters) in Hungary, where they performed concerts, appeared on radio and television, and recorded albums.

== Awards ==
- Gold Medal Recognition from the President of Hungary (2011)
- Nominee; Playboy Magazine (Chicago) for Best Bandleader of the Year
- Winner; Down Beat Magazine (Chicago) Critic's Poll Talent Deserving of Wider Recognition for Vibraharp
- Winner; Hungarian Jazz Society Arranger Competition (2006)
- Vibe Summit Honoree; Los Angeles Jazz Society Top Award for Vibraharp (2002)
- Winner; EmErTon Prize by the Hungarian State Radio in Budapest (1994)
- "Olympic Jazz Festival Week" declared by Los Angeles Mayor Tom Bradley for Vig's production of the official Olympic Jazz Festival (1984)

== Discography ==
=== Albums ===
- The Tommy Vig Orchestra (Take 5, 1964)
- Encounter with Time a.k.a. Space Race (Discovery, 1967)
- The Sound of the Seventies (Milestone, 1968)
- Just for the Record (1971)
- Tommy Vig in Budapest (Mortney, 1972)
- Somebody Loves Me (Dobre, 1976)
- Encounter with Time (Discovery, 1977)
- Tommy Vig 1978, (Dobre, 1978)
- ÜssDob (Tom-Tom, 2008)
- Welcome to Hungary! The Tommy Vig Orchestra 2012 Featuring David Murray (Klasszikus Jazz, 2011)
- Tommy Vig 75! (Klasszikus Jazz, 2014)

=== Film and television scores ===
- 1970s–1980s: This Is the Life (TV series)
- 1974: Nightmare Circus (aka The Barn of the Naked Dead or Terror Circus)
- 1975: Forced Entry
- 1975–1976: Doctors' Hospital (TV Series)
- 1979: Starsky and Hutch (TV Series) "Birds of a Feather"
- 1981: Ruckus
- 1981: Texas Lightning
- 1982: The Kid with the Broken Halo (TV movie)
- 1982: They Call Me Bruce?
- 1983: Sweet Sixteen

=== Compositions ===
Tommy Vig's compositions performed in the U.S. and Europe include:

- Concerto for Clarinet, Vibraharp and Orchestra
- Concerto for Vibraharp and Orchestra
- Concerto for Timpani and Orchestra
- Concerto for Tenor Saxophone and Orchestra
- Four Pieces for Neophonic Orchestra
- Collage for Four Clarinetists
- A Clarinetist and a Harpist
- Music for Tuba and Vibraharp
- Budapest 1956 (Concerto for Jazz Drums and Orchestra)

=== Collaborations ===
With The Beach Boys

- L.A. (Light Album) (CBS Records, 1979)

With Stephen Bishop

- Bish (ABC Records, 1978)

With The Carpenters

- Passage (A&M Records, 1977)

With Art Garfunkel

- Watermark (Columbia Records, 1977)
- Scissors Cut (Columbia Records, 1981)

With High Inergy

- Frenzy (Gordy, 1979)

With Paul Jabara

- Keeping Time (Casablanca, 1978)

With Johnny Mathis and Deniece Williams

- That's What Friends Are For (Columbia, 1979)

With Bruce Roberts

- Bruce Roberts (Elektra Records, 1977)
- Cool Fool (Elektra Records, 1980)

With Diana Ross

- Red Hot Rhythm & Blues (EMI, 1987)

With Marlena Shaw

- Acting Up (Columbia Records, 1978)

With Frank Sinatra

- Sinatra & Company (Reprise, 1971)

With Dusty Springfield

- It Begins Again (United Artists Records, 1978)

With Rod Stewart

- A Night on the Town (Warner Bros. Records, 1976)
- Foot Loose & Fancy Free (Warner Bros. Records, 1977)
- Blondes Have More Fun (Warner Bros. Records, 1978)
- Tonight I'm Yours (Warner Bros. Records, 1981)
- Body Wishes (Warner Bros. Records, 1983)

With Marc Tanner Band

- No Escape (Elektra Records, 1979)

With The Manhattan Transfer

- Pastiche (Atlantic Records, 1978)

== See also ==
- List of music arrangers
