= Rock-a-Doodle-Doo =

Single by Linda Lewis
- B-side: "Reach for the Truth"
- Released: 1973
- Genre: Pop-rock and roll
- Length: 3:26
- Label: Raft Records
- Songwriter: Linda Lewis
- Producers: Linda Lewis, Jim Cregan

Linda Lewis singles chronology
"We Can Win" (1971)	"Rock-a-Doodle-Doo" (1973)	"Play Around" (1973)

Official audio
- "Rock-a-Doodle-Doo" on YouTube

"Rock-a-Doodle-Doo" is a song and hit single by English singer-songwriter Linda Lewis.

Written by Lewis and produced by Lewis and her first husband, Jim Cregan, it was her first hit and her first on the Warner Bros. Records vanity label Raft Records. The song reached No. 15 on the UK charts in 1973.
