= The Shoop Shoop Song (It's in His Kiss) =

1963 single by Merry Clayton

"It's in His Kiss"
- Single record

Single by Betty Everett

from the album "You're No Good"
- B-side: "Hands Off"
- Released: January 1964
- Recorded: November 26, 1963
- Studio: Universal Recording, Chicago
- Genre: R&B; soul; pop
- Length: 2:12
- Label: Vee-Jay 585
- Songwriter: Rudy Clark
- Producer: Calvin Carter

Betty Everett singles chronology
"You're No Good" (1963)	"It's in His Kiss" (1964)	"I Can't Hear You" (1964)

"It's in His Kiss" is a song written and composed by Rudy Clark. It was first released as a single in 1963 by Merry Clayton but did not chart. The song was made a hit a year later when recorded by Betty Everett, who reached No. 6 on the US Billboard Hot 100 chart in April 1964 and No. 1 on the US Cash Box R&B chart. Recorded by dozens of artists and groups around the world in the decades since, the song became an international hit once again when covered by Cher in 1990.

The song is sung from the point of view of a woman trying to mentor a young girl in identifying true love. She emphatically insists, "it's in his kiss". She becomes frustrated with the girl, who suggests other things such as his behavior and his embrace might instead be the signs she is looking for. The woman scolds the girl for not listening to her, and insists that the one sure sign of true love is seen in a lover's kisses.

== Merry Clayton version ==
The song was rejected by the Shirelles, the premier girl group of the early 1960s, and was first recorded in Los Angeles by Merry Clayton as her first credited single. Clayton had previously provided an uncredited female vocal to the hit "You're the Reason I'm Living" recorded by Bobby Darin as his debut on Capitol Records, and Darin had subsequently arranged for Clayton herself to be signed to Capitol. The composer of "It's in His Kiss", Rudy Clark, was a staff writer for TM Music, which Darin headed. Clayton's recording of the song was produced by Jack Nitzsche and featured Hal Blaine on drums and the Blossoms as chorus. It was released as a single on June 10, 1963, without success.

Clayton performed the song again in the 1987 film Maid to Order in which she, as the character Audrey James, sang the song in the film's climactic scene accompanied by the fictional band Loaded Blanks, played by Jack Russell, Lorne Black, Audie Desbrow, Mark Kendall and Michael Lardie of rock band Great White.

== Betty Everett version ==
=== Background ===
Calvin Carter, the chief A&R man for the Chicago-located Vee-Jay Records, found "It's in His Kiss" while visiting New York City in search of material for the Vee-Jay roster which included Betty Everett. After Everett had a hit with another song Carter brought back from New York City, "You're No Good", Carter suggested Everett cut "It's in His Kiss" as the follow-up single. Everett – who found the song puerile – reluctantly agreed. The accompanying vocals on Everett's recording were provided by Vee-Jay session regulars the Opals, a trio of teenage girls (Rose "Tootsie" Addison, Myra Tilliston, and Rose E. Kelley) from East Chicago, Indiana.

Dave Marsh in his book The Heart of Rock and Soul opines that Betty Everett's version, "while [credited] as a solo performance is one of the finest girl group hits, undoubtedly the best one made outside the genre's New York City-Philadelphia-Los Angeles 'axis'".

=== Reception ===
Everett's version of "The Shoop Shoop Song" reached No. 6 on the Billboard Hot 100 chart in April 1964: at the time, Billboard was not publishing its R&B chart, but her cover was a No. 1 R&B hit according to Cash Box. In international release, Everett's "The Shoop Shoop Song" was also a hit in Australia reaching No. 21. It reached No. 2 on the New Zealand Lever Hit Parade chart. It was initially overlooked in the UK, although Everett's minor 1965 U.S. hit "Getting Mighty Crowded" (No. 65) would reach No. 29 there. In 1968, the label President Records reissued both songs on one single, with "The Shoop Shoop Song" as the A-side, which peaked at No. 34. In Canada, it reached No. 5.

== Ramona King version ==
The next recording of "It's in His Kiss" was made in Los Angeles by Ramona King, an R&B singer from San Francisco: this version was produced by Joe Saraceno and former Phil Spector associate Jerry Riopelle and released on Warner Brothers in February 1964, the week prior to the release of Everett's version. Although Everett's single was more likely to receive airplay due to her being an established hitmaker (with "You're No Good"), Vee-Jay feared losing sales to the King version and opted to distinguish Everett's version by issuing it under the title "The Shoop Shoop Song" referring to the song's background vocals.

== Linda Lewis version ==
"It's in His Kiss"

Single by Linda Lewis

from the album Not a Little Girl Anymore
- B-side: "Walk About"
- Released: 1975
- Recorded: 1975
- Studio: Mediasound, New York City
- Genre: Disco
- Length: 3:09
- Label: Arista
- Songwriter: Rudy Clark
- Producers: Bert DeCoteaux; Tony Silvester

Linda Lewis singles chronology
"(Remember the Days of) The Old Schoolyard" (1974)	"It's in His Kiss" (1975)	"Rock and Roller Coaster" (1975)

Official audio
- "It's in His Kiss" on YouTube

=== Background ===
"The Shoop Shoop Song" first became a major UK hit in 1975 via a disco version entitled "It's in His Kiss" by British vocalist Linda Lewis recorded at Mediasound Studios in New York City with producers Bert DeCoteaux and Tony Silvester in a session which also yielded Lewis' recording of her own composition "Rock and Roller Coaster". Lewis would recall: "Clive [Davis]" - Arista Records founder and president - "sent me over to New York [City] to work with Bert DeCoteaux, who’d [produced] Sister Sledge and people like that...And I had all these amazing backing vocalists, like Deniece Williams and Luther Vandross in the studio. I was like, 'Oh, my God!' I’m just this little girl from the East End...I just went in the studio and just hit the nail on the head, apparently." Clive Davis had the idea of Lewis remaking a classic hit song disco-style and had several "oldies" played for Lewis in the studio: (Lewis quote:)"As soon as ['It's in His Kiss'] came on we all said 'That's the one!'" Lewis would state: "I always loved the song and used to sing it in the bath" while opining that making a disco record "isn't really me".

=== Reception ===
Issued as "It's in His Kiss"—despite containing a variant of the "shoop shoop" background vocal—Lewis' version became a UK top-ten hit in August 1975. on July 26, 1975, the track had been ranked at No. 13 in its third charting week, its advance to No. 8 on the August 2, 1975 chart being assisted by Lewis' performance of the song on the TOTP episode dated July 24, 1975, with the track reaching its UK chart peak of No. 6 on August 9, 1975, with a third and final Top Ten ranking at No. 9 on August 16, 1975. "It's in His Kiss" also afforded Lewis an Irish Top Ten hit at No. 9, and in the US ranked as high as No. 11 in club play with peripheral cross-over to the R&B chart in Billboard at No. 96, while the track almost reached the Billboard Hot 100, "bubbling under" at No. 107. "It's in His Kiss" was included on Lewis' debut Arista Records album release Not a Little Girl Anymore which reached No. 40 in the UK Albums Chart.

== Linda Ronstadt performances ==
On the episode of Saturday Night Live broadcast May 19, 1979, Linda Ronstadt and Phoebe Snow performed "The Shoop Shoop Song" as a duet; in an October 2008 interview Snow stated that she and Ronstadt "always talked about" recording "The Shoop Shoop Song", adding: "Maybe we still will." However, the duet remained unrecorded at the time of Snow's April 26, 2011, death. When Ronstadt participated in two benefit concerts for Jerry Brown on December 21–22, 1979, she performed "The Shoop Shoop Song". That number – featuring a vocal accompaniment by Nicolette Larson – was one of six songs performed by Ronstadt that were announced as tracks on her upcoming album Mad Love; nonetheless, Mad Love was issued in February 1980 without the inclusion of "The Shoop Shoop Song". Ronstadt performed the song as a guest on an episode of The Muppet Show broadcast October 26, 1980. At the Rally for Nuclear Disarmament concert held in Central Park on June 12, 1982, Ronstadt's set included "The Shoop Shoop Song"; vocal accompaniment was provided by Nicolette Larson and Rosemary Butler. Had Ronstadt recorded "The Shoop Shoop Song" for her Mad Love album, it would have been produced by Peter Asher, who would eventually produce the 1990 international smash hit cover by Cher.

== Cher version ==
"The Shoop Shoop Song (It's in His Kiss)"

Single by Cher

from the album Music From the Original Motion Picture Soundtrack - Mermaids and Love Hurts
- B-side: "Love on a Rooftop"
- Released: November 7, 1990
- Genre: Pop
- Length: 2:51
- Label: Geffen; Epic
- Songwriter: Rudy Clark
- Producer: Peter Asher

Cher singles chronology
"Baby I'm Yours" (1990)	"The Shoop Shoop Song (It's in His Kiss)" (1990)	"Love and Understanding" (1991)

Music video
- "The Shoop Shoop Song (It's In His Kiss) (Alternate Version)" on YouTube

=== Background ===
Cher's cover was part of the soundtrack of her 1990 film Mermaids, in which it plays during the closing credits. The single's US release coincided with the November release of the film. It peaked at No. 33 on the Billboard Hot 100, and No. 1 in the United Kingdom. The song was Cher's first solo No. 1 single; her only previous No. 1 in the UK had been in 1965 with her then-husband Sonny Bono (their first hit, "I Got You Babe").

Cher's "The Shoop Shoop Song" also topped the charts in Austria, Ireland and Norway; the single peaked at No. 2 in Belgium and achieved Top Ten status in France, Germany, New Zealand, Australia, Switzerland, Netherlands and Sweden.

The considerable success of the single in the United Kingdom and continental Europe was reflected in its addition to Love Hurts, Cher's subsequent album; it was released there as well as in Australia and New Zealand. "The Shoop Shoop Song" was also included in the album's Canadian release but not in the United States. "The Shoop Shoop Song" was not available on a Cher album in the US until the 1999 release of If I Could Turn Back Time: Cher's Greatest Hits.

=== Critical reception ===
Larry Flick from Billboard magazine wrote, "Fun and faithful cover of Betty Everett's pop nugget is lifted from the soundtrack to Cher's new film, 'Mermaids'. Truly irresistible."

=== Music video ===
The original video for Cher's cover of "The Shoop Shoop Song (It's in His Kiss)" was directed by Marty Callner, and it was made to help promote the movie Mermaids. The video features Cher with Winona Ryder and Christina Ricci, who played her daughters in the film, in a music studio in the clothes and styles of the 1960s period of the film (clips of which are shown throughout). Near the end, the video switches from black-and-white to color and Cher and the girls are shown in jeans and leather jackets spray-painting a wall in an alley. A revised video was issued that deleted the clips of the film from the video. The leather jacket seen at the end of the video is one of the earliest custom Chrome Hearts jackets ever made.

=== Track listing ===
- US 7-inch and cassette single
1. "The Shoop Shoop Song (It's in His Kiss)" – 2:51
2. "Love on a Rooftop" – 4:22
- European 7-inch and cassette single
1. "The Shoop Shoop Song (It's in His Kiss)" – 2:51
2. "Baby I'm Yours" – 3:19
- European 12-inch and CD single
1. "The Shoop Shoop Song (It's in His Kiss)" – 2:51
2. "Baby I'm Yours" – 3:19
3. "We All Sleep Alone" – 3:53
- 1993 Spanish 12-inch single
1. "The Shoop Shoop Song (It's in His Kiss)" – 2:51
2. "Love and Understanding" – 4:42
3. "Save Up All Your Tears" – 3:58
- 1997 US 12-inch single
1. "The Shoop Shoop Song (It's in His Kiss)" (Obsession Mix) – 8:21
2. "The Shoop Shoop Song (It's in His Kiss)" (Crush Mix) – 8:19
3. "The Shoop Shoop Song (It's in His Kiss)" (Ventura Party Dub) – 6:45
4. "The Shoop Shoop Song (It's in His Kiss)" (Ventura Radio Edit) – 4:03

=== Charts ===
==== Weekly charts ====
Chart (1990–1991)	Peak position
Australia (ARIA)	4
Austria (Ö3 Austria Top 40)	1
Belgium (Ultratop 50 Flanders)	2
Canada Top Singles (RPM)	21
Canada Adult Contemporary (RPM)	4
Denmark (IFPI)	1
Europe (Eurochart Hot 100)	1
Europe (European Hit Radio)	3
France (SNEP)	3
Germany (GfK)	3
Iceland (Íslenski Listinn Topp 40)	7
Ireland (IRMA)	1
Israel (IBA)	1
Luxembourg (Radio Luxembourg)	1
Netherlands (Dutch Top 40)	5
Netherlands (Single Top 100)	5
New Zealand (Recorded Music NZ)	3
Norway (VG-lista)	1
Portugal (AFP)	3
Quebec (ADISQ)	25
Spain Top 40 Radio (AFYVE)	37
Sweden (Sverigetopplistan)	10
Switzerland (Schweizer Hitparade)	4
UK Singles (Official Charts)	1
UK Airplay (Music Week)	1
US Billboard Hot 100	33
US Adult Contemporary (Billboard)	7
US Cash Box Top 100	43
Zimbabwe (ZIMA)	1

Chart (1997)	Peak position
US Dance Maxi-Singles (Billboard)	50

Chart (2019)	Peak position
Poland Airplay (ZPAV)	56

==== Year-end charts ====
Chart (1991)	Position
Australia (ARIA)	10
Austria (Ö3 Austria Top 40)	3
Belgium (Ultratop 50 Flanders)	14
Canada Adult Contemporary (RPM)	49
Europe (Eurochart Hot 100)	5
Europe (European Hit Radio)	7
Germany (Media Control)	8
Israel (IBA)	7
Netherlands (Dutch Top 40)	44
Netherlands (Single Top 100)	36
New Zealand (RIANZ)	9
Norway Spring Period (VG-lista)	1
Sweden (Topplistan)	38
Switzerland (Schweizer Hitparade)	7
UK Singles (OCC)	3
US Adult Contemporary (Billboard)	48

==== Decade-end charts ====
Chart (1990–1999)	Position
Austria (Ö3 Austria Top 40)	20
Ireland (IRMA)	27

=== Certifications and sales ===
Region	Certification	Certified units/sales
Australia (ARIA)	Platinum	70,000^{^}
Austria (IFPI Austria)	Gold	25,000^{*}
Denmark (IFPI Danmark)	Gold	45,000^{‡}
France (SNEP)	Silver	200,000^{*}
Germany (BVMI)	Gold	250,000^{^}
New Zealand (RMNZ)	Gold	5,000^{*}
New Zealand (RMNZ) digital	Gold	15,000^{‡}
United Kingdom (BPI)	Gold	483,000
^{*} Sales figures based on certification alone.^{^} Shipments figures based on certification alone.^{‡} Sales+streaming figures based on certification alone.

=== Release history ===
Region	Date	Format(s)	Label(s)	Ref.
United States	November 7, 1990	7-inch vinyl; cassette	Geffen	
Australia	February 11, 1991	7-inch vinyl; CD; cassette	Epic; Geffen	
United Kingdom	April 1, 1991	7-inch vinyl; CD; cassette	Epic	

== Other versions ==
- The song was covered by many British invasion bands such as the Hollies, the Searchers, and the Swinging Blue Jeans, who had all recorded versions in 1964.
- In 1974 the song was remade by Australian band the Bootleg Family Band: "The Shoop Shoop Song" was a top 5 hit for the band, who later became known as Avalanche.
- In 1976 Anne Renée recorded the French-language version "Embrasse-le" (Kiss Him), which borrowed the arrangement of the 1975 Linda Lewis disco cover.
- Kate Taylor remade "It's in His Kiss" at the suggestion of Livingston Taylor: an acoustic rendition featuring a counter vocal by James Taylor (who co-produced the track with Lew Hahn). The Kate Taylor version was recorded in August 1977 at Atlantic Recording Studios in New York City and became her sole Billboard Hot 100 hit with a No. 49 peak on the Hot 100, on Billboard's Easy Listening chart, the track reached Mo. 13. Despite omitting the signature background vocals of the Betty Everett version, the Kate Taylor cover was titled "It's in His Kiss (The Shoop Shoop Song)". The track was featured on Kate Taylor's 1978 self-titled album release. Cash Box said that "although it's a soft rocker, her vocal is energetic and the song resonates with new life." In Canada it reached #77 on the Top 100 charts, and #21 on the AC charts.
- Maja Blagdan recorded a Croatian-language version of the song, titled "Cura za sve" (Girl for Everything). It was included in her 1994 album Bijele ruže (White Roses).
- Thalía recorded a cover of the song in Spanish as part of an advertising campaign for Hershey's Kisses.
- The jukebox musical The Cher Show, which played in Chicago in mid-2018 and opened on Broadway in December 2018, features Stephanie J. Block, Micaela Diamond and Teal Wicks as the three aspects of Cher performing "The Shoop Shoop Song". Lauren Katz's review of the Chicago production at PictureThisPost.com mentions that the song is "creatively weaved into the storytelling[, appearing] in Act One in the midst of the early days of [Cher's] romance with Sonny....Cher and her best friends gossip about the possibility of whether or not Sonny is in love with her, and then break into the song. The piece is fun, light-hearted, and full of the hope that young Cher...for her life with this man." Block, Diamond and Wicks recorded the song for the show's Broadway cast album released April 2019.
- A parody version themed around drug testing, "It's In His Piss", was recorded by the drag queen group The Kinsey Sicks.

== See also ==
- List of European number-one airplay songs of the 1990s
