= Ain't Love a Bitch =

Single by Rod Stewart

from the album Blondes Have More Fun
- B-side: "Last Summer" (US); "Scarred and Scared" (UK)
- Released: January 1979
- Genre: Rock and roll
- Length: 4:39
- Label: Riva Records (UK), Warner Bros. (rest of the world)
- Songwriters: Gary Grainger, Rod Stewart
- Producer: Tom Dowd

Rod Stewart singles chronology
"Da Ya Think I'm Sexy?" (1978)	"Ain't Love a Bitch" (1979)	"Blondes (Have More Fun)" (1979)

"Ain't Love a Bitch" is a song written by Gary Grainger and Rod Stewart. Stewart released it on his 1978 album Blondes Have More Fun, and it was one of four songs on the album co-written by Stewart and Grainger. The song was released as a single in 1979, reaching #11 on the UK charts, and #22 on the Billboard Hot 100 chart in the United States. It spent 8 weeks on the UK charts and 6 weeks on the US charts. The song also reached the Top Ten in several countries, including Ireland. Billboard magazine placed Stewart #7 on its list of the Top Single Artists of 1979 on the strength of "Ain't Love a Bitch" and its predecessor, "Da Ya Think I'm Sexy?".

Stewart performed the song on Dave Allen's Dave Allen at Large. A video of the song was included on the DVD included in the deluxe editions of the compilation album Some Guys Have All the Luck / The Definitive Rod Stewart.

== Music and lyrics ==
Stewart biographer Sean Egan described the music as having "gentle, melodious and sprightly tones". Record World described the rhythm as "light" and said that Stewart's vocals "have a music hall quality."

Egan described the lyrics as "detailing...the vicissitudes of romance" and recognizing that some of the singer's suffering in romance is due to the fact that he can't grow up. The lyrics of one verse refer back to Stewart's earlier hit single "Maggie May", describing a woman who took the singer's virginity at 17 and "made a first class fool out of [him]", and ending with the line "Oh Maggie if you're still out there the rest is history."

== Background ==
Rolling Stone critic Janet Maslin excoriated the song as being "unexpectedly sensitive, with a soft, strum-along melody and a bunch of namby-pamby characters doo-doo-doing a background chorus while Stewart croons about old girlfriends." She further criticizes the song for taking material that could have been tough and making it sound "like the 1400th cover version of 'I Left My Heart in San Francisco.'" CD Review commented on the references within "Ain't Love a Bitch" to Stewart's earlier song "Maggie May", describing the music as "bouncy". High Fidelity objected to the lyrics blaming women for love's problems. The Albany Herald also noted that the song is autobiographical, and incorporates elements from Stewart's "musical and personal past." Stereo Review described the song as a "repellent frat-house love song". Stephen Thomas Erlewine of Allmusic described the song as being in the same mold as "Da Ya Think I'm Sexy?". Author Barry Alan Farber described the line "Ain't we all a little juvenile" as encapsulating the way people retain pieces of their adolescence into adulthood. Cash Box called it a "return to the...balladeering of 'Tonight's The Night'" after the disco success of "Do Ya Think I'm Sexy" and said the song has "gentle, soothing acoustic guitar work, strings, and light drumming."

== Chart performance ==
Chart (1979)	Peak position
Ireland (IRMA)	5
UK Singles (The Official Charts Company)	11
US Billboard Hot 100	22
