= A Tear and a Smile (Linda Lewis album) =

Studio album by Linda Lewis
- Released: September 1983
- Genre: Soul, rhythm and blues
- Label: Raft Records
- Producer: Bert DeCouteaux

Linda Lewis chronology
Hacienda View (1979)	A Tear and a Smile (1983)	Second Nature (1995)

A Tear and a Smile is an album by English singer Linda Lewis, released in 1983. Lewis' eighth album.

== Track listing ==
=== Side one ===
1. "This Boy" – (Linda Lewis, Bill Amesbury)
2. "Destination Love" – (Diane Warren)
3. "(Close the Door) Take Your Heart" – (Allee Willis, David Lasley)
4. "Don't Let It Go" – (Soo Jeffers, Stephen Rutledge)
5. "I Am What I Am" – (Colin Campsie, George McFarlane, Billy Lyall)

=== Side two ===
1. "Take Me For a Little While" – (Trade Martin)
2. "You Don't Know What You're Missing" – (Barbara Morr, Kathy Ingraham)
3. "Why Can't I Be The Other Woman" – (Linda Lewis, Toni Attell)
4. "Sweet Heartache" – (Linda Lewis)
5. "I Can't Get Enough" – (Linda Lewis)

=== 2012 remastered CD bonus tracks ===
1. "Come on Back" – (Linda Lewis)
2. "I Can Take It" – (Linda Lewis, Bill Amesbury)
3. "Class/Style (I've Got It)" (12" groove mix) – (David McGarry, David Parton, Les Hunt)
4. "You Turned My Bitter into Sweet" – (Chester Pipkin, Gary Pipkin, Marc Gordon)
5. "Class/Style (I've Got It)" (single version) – (David McGarry, David Parton, Les Hunt)
