= Blondes Have More Fun =

Studio album by Rod Stewart
- Released: 24 November 1978
- Recorded: 1978
- Genres: Rock, rock and roll, disco
- Length: 43:09
- Labels: Riva, Warner Bros.
- Producer: Tom Dowd

Rod Stewart chronology
| Foot Loose & Fancy Free (1977) | Blondes Have More Fun (1978) | Greatest Hits, Vol. 1 (1979) |

Singles from Blondes Have More Fun
- 1. "Da Ya Think I'm Sexy?" Released: November 1978; 2. "Ain't Love a Bitch" Released: January 1979; 3. "Blondes (Have More Fun)" Released: April 1979

Professional ratings
Review scores
| Source | Rating |
|---|---|
| AllMusic | 3/5 stars |
| Christgau's Record Guide | B |
| Rolling Stone | (Unfavourable) |
| The Rolling Stone Album Guide | 2.5/5 stars |

Blondes Have More Fun is British musician Rod Stewart's ninth studio album, released in November 1978. As was the popular musical trend at the time, it is Stewart's foray into disco music. The album was commercially successful, reaching number 3 in the UK and number 1 in the US, but was critically divisive. The lead single "Da Ya Think I'm Sexy?" became one of Stewart's biggest hits, peaking at No.1 in both the UK and US.

== Overview ==
After carving a highly successful career throughout the 1970s as a rock singer, Stewart elected to follow the disco trend that was at its peak in 1978 for some tracks of this album. The first single was "Da Ya Think I'm Sexy?" which became a number one hit in the UK, US, Australia and a number of other countries. Many critics panned the direction of song towards disco, but it nevertheless became one of his biggest hits. Stewart has since defended the song commenting that Paul McCartney and The Rolling Stones had also dabbled with disco music by this time. The second single was "Ain't Love a Bitch", which became a No.11 hit in the UK and No.22 in the US. The third and final single "Blondes (Have More Fun)" peaked at 63 in the UK, his lowest-charting single there at this time, but performed better in Ireland at No.23.

The album itself peaked at No.3 in the UK, being certified platinum by Christmas and was a No.1 hit in the US, where it went triple platinum. It also charted within the top ten in a host of other countries.

== Track listing ==
Side one

1. "Da Ya Think I'm Sexy?" (Rod Stewart, Carmine Appice, Duane Hitchings) – 5:31^{[a]}
2. "Dirty Weekend" (Stewart, Gary Grainger) – 2:36
3. "Ain't Love a Bitch" (Stewart, Grainger) – 4:39
4. "The Best Days of My Life" (Stewart, Jim Cregan) – 4:21
5. "Is That the Thanks I Get?" (Stewart, Cregan) – 4:32

Side two

1. "Attractive Female Wanted" (Stewart, Grainger) – 4:17
2. "Blondes (Have More Fun)" (Stewart, Cregan) – 3:46
3. "Last Summer" (Stewart, Philip Chen) – 4:05
4. "Standin' in the Shadows of Love" (Lamont Dozier, Eddie Holland, Brian Holland) – 4:28
5. "Scarred and Scared" (Stewart, Grainger) – 4:54

^{a} Stewart has acknowledged that the song inadvertently incorporates the melody from the song "Taj Mahal" by Jorge Ben Jor, although Ben Jor was not given a writing credit.

== Personnel ==
Rod Stewart Band

- Rod Stewart – vocals
- Gary Grainger, Billy Peek – guitar
- Jim Cregan – guitar, backing vocals
- Phil Chen – bass guitar, backing vocals
- Carmine Appice – drums, backing vocals

Invited guests

- Fred Tackett – acoustic guitars
- Nicky Hopkins – piano
- Duane Hitchings – keyboards, synthesizer
- Roger Bethelmy – drums
- Paulinho Da Costa, Tommy Vig – percussion
- Gary Herbig – flute
- Phil Kenzie, Tom Scott – tenor saxophone
- Steve Madaio – trumpet
- Mike Finnigan – background vocals
- Max Carl Gronenthal – background vocals
- Linda Lewis – vocals
- Catherine Allison – piano, background vocals
- Del Newman – string arrangements

Production

- Tom Dowd – producer, mixing
- Andy Johns – engineer, mixing
- George Tutko, David Gerts – assistant engineers
- Mixed at Smoke Tree and Cherokee Studios.

== Charts ==
=== Weekly charts ===
| Chart (1978–79) | Peak position |
|---|---|
| Australian Albums (Kent Music Report) | 1 |
| Austrian Albums (Ö3 Austria) | 10 |
| Canada Top Albums/CDs (RPM) | 1 |
| Dutch Albums (Album Top 100) | 3 |
| German Albums (Offizielle Top 100) | 9 |
| New Zealand Albums (RMNZ) | 1 |
| Norwegian Albums (VG-lista) | 2 |
| Swedish Albums (Sverigetopplistan) | 1 |
| UK Albums (Official Charts) | 3 |
| US Billboard 200 | 1 |

=== Year-end charts ===
| Chart (1979) | Position |
|---|---|
| Canada Top Albums/CDs (RPM) | 10 |
| German Albums (Offizielle Top 100) | 48 |
| New Zealand Albums (RMNZ) | 8 |
| US Billboard 200 | 10 |

== Certifications and sales ==
| Region | Certification | Certified units/sales |
|---|---|---|
| Australia (ARIA) | 2× Platinum | 140,000^{^} |
| France (SNEP) | 2× Gold | 200,000^{*} |
| Germany (BVMI) | Gold | 250,000^{^} |
| Hong Kong (IFPI Hong Kong) | Platinum | 20,000^{*} |
| New Zealand (RMNZ) | Platinum | 15,000^{^} |
| Sweden | — | 200,000 |
| United Kingdom (BPI) | Platinum | 600,000 |
| United States (RIAA) | 3× Platinum | 4,000,000 |
Summaries
| Worldwide | — | 10,000,000 |
^{*} Sales figures based on certification alone.^{^} Shipments figures based on certification alone.
