= Blondes (Have More Fun) =

Single by Rod Stewart

from the album Blondes Have More Fun
- B-side: "Best Days of My Life"
- Released: 27 April 1979
- Recorded: 1978
- Genre: Rock and roll
- Length: 3:46
- Label: Warner Bros.
- Songwriters: Jim Cregan, Rod Stewart
- Producer: Tom Dowd

Rod Stewart singles chronology
"Ain't Love a Bitch" (1979)	"Blondes (Have More Fun)" (1979)	"(If Loving You Is Wrong) I Don't Want to Be Right" (1980)

Music video
- "Blondes (Have More Fun)" on YouTube

"Blondes (Have More Fun)" is a song written by Rod Stewart and Jim Cregan that was originally released as the title track of Stewart's 1978 album Blondes Have More Fun. In some countries it was released as the third single off the album, following "Da Ya Think I'm Sexy?" and "Ain't Love a Bitch". It only reached the Top 70 in the UK, topping out at #63 but reached #23 in Ireland. The song was covered by Vince Neil on the Japanese version of his album Exposed.

== Music and lyrics ==
Stewart biographer Sean Egan described the music as a "slinky 1950s shuffle". CD Review described the song as a "barrelhouse rocker." The Beaver County Times described the song as "a rollicking Chuck Berry-style rocker, complete with honky-tonk piano." Henry McNulty of the Hartford Courant described it as a "straightforward rocker" on which Stewart seems to be having fun and particularly praised the way the "rich, warm horns" set off the screeching lead guitar and tinkling piano.

Egan considered the lyrics to be among Stewart's most autobiographical, describing his preference for statuesque, blonde women and his interest is strictly on engaging in sexual intercourse. Egan notes signs of hubris in the song, where Stewart refers to himself "in the third person and via a pet name" in the line "God knows, Rodder just needs to ball."

== Reception ==
Stephen Thomas Erlewine of Allmusic described the song as being a "winning track" in the same mold as "Da Ya Think I'm Sexy?" and "Ain't Love a Bitch". Circus writer David Fricke suggested that the "stocky, swaggering sound" that Stewart's band achieves on the song "proves Stewart has not forgotten how to rock." McNulty considered it to be "the most worthwhile song" on the album. The Albany Herald wrote that the "hardrocking" song is one of the highlights among the songs of "up and down love affairs" on the Blondes Have More Fun album. Rolling Stone critic Janet Maslin described it as one of the three "tolerable" songs on the album. The Ottawa Journal similarly called it the best song on the album. Author Sharon Davis described the song as Stewart's last hit before 1983's "Baby Jane." Critic Dave Tianen rated the song as Stewart's 4th worst (two notches better than 2nd place "Da Ya Think I'm Sexy,") saying that it "would almost be beneath RuPaul." But critic Mark Brown considered it to be "wonderful." Classic Rock History critic Tony Scavieli ranked it as Stewart's 8th greatest song of the 1970s, stating that it "certified that Rod Stewart’s foray into disco [on "Da Ya Think I'm Sexy"] was just a small moment in time and that the album was not all disco." Jason Anderson of Uncut called it a "decent blues boogie", praising the "greasy guitar licks, barrelhouse piano and Phil Kenzie's raunchy sax."

== Live version ==
"Blondes (Have More Fun)" was included on Rod Stewart's live video Live at the L.A. Forum. A live version was also included on the 2014 album Live 1976-1998: Tonight's the Night. Graham Hicks of the Edmonton Journal felt the live version was preferable to the studio version, calling the live version a "rhythm and blues number" and stating that this proved that the "production" was responsible for the blandness of the studio version.

== Music video ==
The music video for the song was on MTV's first day.
