= Say No More (Linda Lewis album) =

Studio album by Linda Lewis
- Released: 1971
- Genres: Soul, rhythm and blues, folk
- Label: Reprise
- Producer: Ian Samwell

Linda Lewis chronology
Say No More (1971)	Lark (1972)

Say No More is the debut solo album by English singer Linda Lewis, released in 1971.

== Track listing ==
All tracks composed by Linda Lewis; except where indicated.

=== Side One ===
1. "For Mama"
2. "Come Along People"
3. "The Same Song" - (Ian Samwell)
4. "Hampstead Way"
5. "Peter's Garden"
6. "We Can Win" - (Linda Lewis, Ian Samwell)

=== Side Two ===
1. "Funky Kitchen"
2. "Follow the Piper"
3. "Donkeys Years" - (Linda Lewis, Ian Samwell)
4. "I Dunno"
5. "Magic in the Music"
6. "Hymn"

== Personnel ==
- Linda Lewis - Vocals, backing vocals, guitar on "Funky Kitchen"
- Chris Spedding - Guitars, bass, electric piano
- Ray Cooper - Vibraphone, marimba
- Shawn Phillips - Guitar
- Ian McDonald - Flute
- Mike Egan - Guitar
- Skaila Kanga - Harp
- Fiachra Trench - Keyboards
- Louis Cenamo, George Ford - Bass
- Terry Cox, Pete Gavin - Drums
