= Billy Peek =

American musician (born 1940)

Billy Peek (born 1940 in St. Louis, Missouri) is an American rock and roll and blues guitarist, singer, songwriter, composer, and producer. Billy Peek has recorded, toured, and played as lead guitarist for rock icon Rod Stewart for five years. Billy Peek has recorded, toured, and performed with rock legend Chuck Berry and was in the backing band for Chuck Berry's European tour. Peek continuously performs with his own band throughout the U.S. He has released three albums under his own name, including Can a White Boy Play the Blues? (1986).

== Biography ==
Peek was born in South St. Louis, and as a child growing up in the 1950s he lived for a time in the apartment above his parents' bar known as the Peek-A-Boo Inn. There he began playing the guitar with his father. When he was a bit older he heard the music of other burgeoning St. Louis musicians such as Chuck Berry and Ike Turner and it completely changed his life, leading Peek to focus his energies on blues and rock. At the age of 15, Peek formed his own band and went over to East St. Louis to listen to performers like Ike Turner, Little Mlton and Albert King. At the age of 18 Peek would sit in with Ike Turner's band. Peek learned the language of the blues and tried it out on his guitar from the sounds of B.B. King, Elmore James and Muddy Waters. However, the most important influence on Peek was Chuck Berry. Peek performed on a TV show, Russ Carter's St. Louis Hop, which led him to opening for Chuck Berry at the first-anniversary show at the Casa Loma Ballroom.

In 1963, Peek began performing during the "Gaslight Square" Era on the DeBaliviere Strip, where Chuck Berry strolled in and sat in the audience. Chuck Berry later came up and congratulated Peek on his playing and invited him to perform at Berry's club on Sunday afternoons, where sometimes Berry would sit in with Peek's group and they would play together. This led to a musical and personal association which led to a European tour during which Peek played in Berry's backup band. Peek also played with Berry during Berry's induction into the Rock and Roll Hall of Fame in 1986.

They performed together in 1975 on a television show, Don Kirshner's Rock Concert. Rod Stewart happened to see that television show with his soon to be exiting guitarist Ronnie Wood, who was set to join the Rolling Stones. Rod Stewart called and set up an audition for Peek a few months later. Peek laid down a hard driving Chuck Berry-style rhythm during the audition, where he saw Rod Stewart jump in the air and hit his head of the control booth and yell "that's it, that's it" and he knew he had the job. With Peek's guitar helping set the pace, the Rod Stewart Group (RSG) became one of the best-selling musical aggregations in the world over the next 5 years.

Billy Peek's guitar solos on "Better Off Dead", "Blondes Have More Fun", "Ball Trap", "Wild Side of Life", "Big Bayou", "She Won't Dance with Me", "Born Loose" and "Hot Legs" anchored the band in the traditional rock-and-roll style. Stewart's band dissolved in 1980 and Peek returned to St. Louis where he continued to be a local favorite, which led to the emergence of Peek's first solo blues album Can a White Boy Play the Blues?, which attracted some attention in the U.S. and England and on blues radio stations.

== 21st century ==
While he mostly performs locally in the St. Louis area, Billy Peek has toured, played, and recorded with many major rock and roll and blues musicians. Under his own name, he has recorded three albums. A Billy Peek TV documentary aired by PBS affiliate KETC entitled Living St. Louis on November 8, 2007. On January 21, 2013, Peek performed for the Chuck Berry Lifetime Achievement Award Show in St. Louis. On June 6, 2014, Peek reunited with Rod Stewart onstage at the Scottrade Center in St. Louis.

== Discography ==
Billy Peek

- Rock To The Top / Why Did You Leave Me [single] (1960)
- Twistin' Johnny B. Goode / 7-Come-11 [single] (1962)
- It Came Out Of The Sky / Population Explosion [single] (1970)
- Can a White Boy Play The Blues? (1986)
- The Answer (1992)
- Tribute to a Poet (2006)

Rod Stewart

- Get Back (1976)
- All This and World War 2 (1976)
- A Night on the Town (1976)
- Footloose & Fancy Free (1977)
- Blondes Have More Fun (1978)
- Rod Stewart's Greatest Hits (1979)
- Foolish Behavior (1980)
- The Rod Stewart Sessions 1971-1998 (2009)
- Rod Stewart Live 1976-1998 (2014)

Chuck Berry

- Concerto in B Goode (1969)

Eric Carmen

- Tonight You're Mine (1980)
