= Linda Lewis =

British musician (1950–2023)

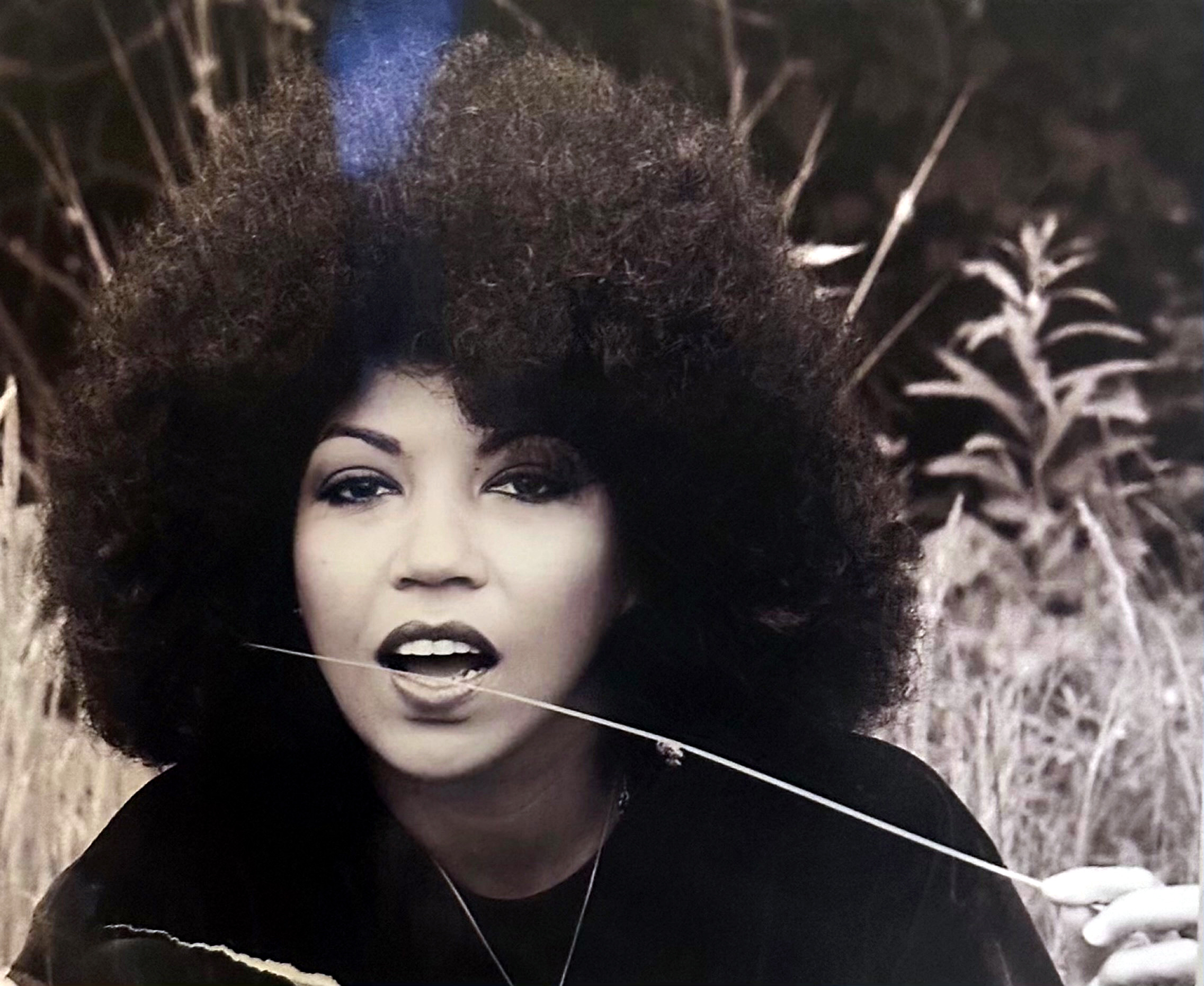
- Lewis photographed by Colin Grainger in 1983

Background information
- Born: Linda Ann Fredericks; 27 September 1950; Custom House, London, England
- Died: 3 May 2023 (aged 72) Waltham Abbey, Essex, England
- Genres: Pop; soul; folk; rock; ska; funk
- Occupations: Musician; singer; songwriter
- Instruments: Vocals; guitar
- Years active: c. 1964–2023
- Labels: Polydor; Reprise; Raft; Arista; Ariola; Electricity; Turpin; Tangential; BMD

Linda Ann Fredericks (27 September 1950 – 3 May 2023), better known as Linda Lewis, was a British musician. Lewis is recognised as the first black British female singer/songwriter to enter the UK charts.She is best known for the singles "Rock-a-Doodle-Doo" (1973) and her version of Betty Everett's "The Shoop Shoop Song" (1975). Her discography includes solo albums, Lark (1972), Not a Little Girl Anymore (1975), Woman Overboard (1977), and the later Second Nature (1995), which became successful in countries such as Japan. Lewis also provided backing vocals for other artists, including David Bowie, Al Kooper, Cat Stevens, Steve Harley & Cockney Rebel, Rick Wakeman, Rod Stewart, Stomu Yamashta, Peter Bardens, Hummingbird, Joan Armatrading and Jamiroquai.

She was the eldest of six children, three of whom also had singing careers. Lewis was a self-taught guitarist and keyboard player, influenced by Harry Nilsson, Billie Holiday and Smokey Robinson, also drawing inspiration from others such as Joni Mitchell. Her music blended folk, funk and soul.

== Biography ==
=== Early life ===
Linda Fredericks was born in Custom House, Newham, in 1950. Her father was of Jamaican descent, and her mother was Guyanese. Her parents divorced when she was three, so she was raised primarily by her mother, who was also a singer. She attended St Angela’s Ursuline school for girls in Forest Gate, London E7. Lewis attended stage school and was regularly cast in non-speaking television and film roles such as A Taste of Honey (1961); she appeared as a screaming fan in the first Beatles film, A Hard Day's Night (1964) and also sang to the public. She joined The Q Set, a British band who performed ska and blue beat, Jamaican-style music.

In 1964, she sang "Dancing in the Street" with John Lee Hooker at a club in Southend-on-Sea. Hooker introduced her to Ian Samwell, who arranged for Don Arden to manage her. She signed with Polydor and in 1967 recorded the single "You Turned My Bitter into Sweet", which is now a collectable Northern Soul record. Polydor worried that her name, Linda Fredericks, would be confused with Linda Kendrick, who was also signed to Polydor. Fredericks used the name Linda Lewis in honour of singer Barbara Lewis. The surname would also be used professionally by her sisters, Dee Lewis and Shirley Lewis, and her mother.

=== 1970s ===
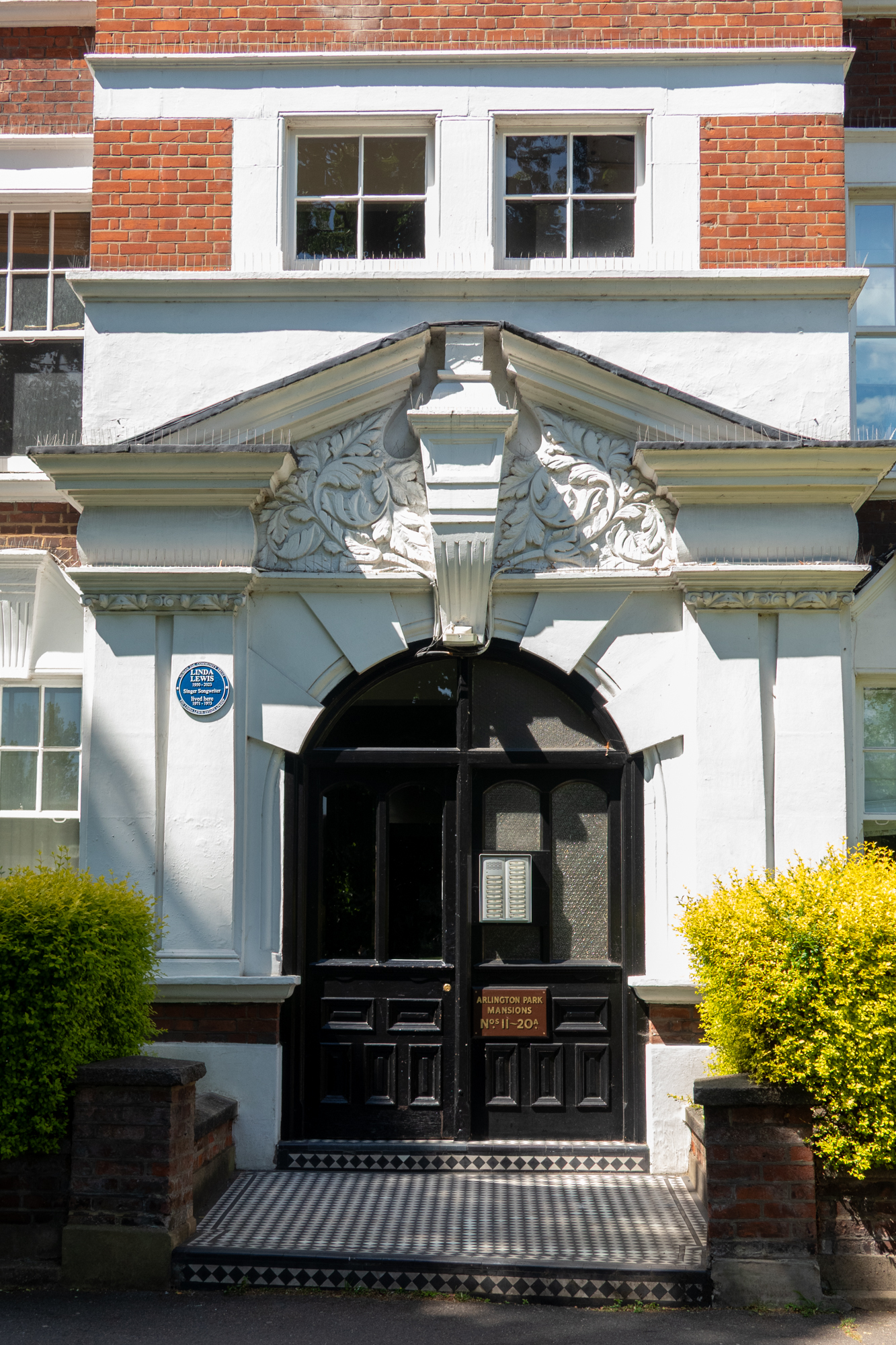
33A Arlington Mansions, Sutton Court Road, Chiswick London, Lewis's former home, commemorated by a blue plaque

During 1967, Linda Lewis formed White Rabbit with Junior Kerr moving on to replace Marsha Hunt in the soul rock band The Ferris Wheel in 1970 and touring Europe with them. She also recorded the album Ferris Wheel (1970) and the single "Can't Stop Now" with them before the band broke up the same year. In 1971, Lewis appeared at the second Glastonbury Festival (where she jammed with Terry Reid and David Lindley), having been booked by the DJ and concert booker Jeff Dexter. After a chance meeting with Warner Bros. Records executive Ian Ralfini, Lewis signed to the label's imprint Reprise. Lewis also worked as a session vocalist in this period, which led to her appearance on albums such as A Possible Projection of the Future / Childhood's End by Al Kooper, David Bowie's Aladdin Sane (1973), Cat Stevens's Catch Bull at Four (1972) and Hummingbird's first album Hummingbird (1975). She then signed to Family's new Warner/Reprise distributed "Raft" label.

Her first hit single "Rock-a-Doodle-Doo" reached No. 15 in the UK Singles Chart in the summer of 1973, and it was followed by the album Fathoms Deep, which featured former Jeff Beck Group guitarist Bobby Tench. This album established her as one of Britain's most promising young female singer-songwriters and was critically acclaimed, but it did not have the expected success, probably due to Raft Records becoming insolvent at that time. However, several appearances on the BBC TV show Top of the Pops raised her profile, and an extensive world tour with Cat Stevens followed. On her return to the studio, she signed to Arista Records and recorded what would become her breakthrough album Not a Little Girl Anymore (1975), which featured Allen Toussaint and the Tower of Power horn section. A cover of "The Shoop Shoop Song" was released as a single, under the title of "It's in His Kiss", at the same time as the album, reaching No. 6 in the UK Singles Chart. The singles "The Old Schoolyard" which Cat Stevens wrote for her, and "It's in His Kiss" were produced by the team of Tony Sylvester and Bert de Coteaux. On 5 July 1975, Lewis opened the Knebworth Festival, being followed by Roy Harper, Captain Beefheart and the Magic Band, the Steve Miller Band and Pink Floyd. She sings on the Go Too album, released in 1977, with Jess Roden. Three more albums followed over the next few years. In 1986 and 1987, she recorded with her sisters Dee and Shirley as Lewis, then as Lewis Sisters.

=== Later years ===
During the next decade, Lewis retreated from public life and moved to Los Angeles although, in 1983 she took part in Bullseye (British game show) as the celebrity throwing for charity, and in 1984, she again appeared at the Glastonbury Festival, as well as recording for Electricity Records. In 1992 she worked on the Joan Armatrading album Square the Circle as a backing vocalist, along with her sister Shirley and Sylvia Mason-James. She then returned to record Second Nature (1995), which found success in the Japanese charts. Its success led to live performances, which were recorded and released as On the Stage – Live in Japan (1996). Three more albums followed. Warner Bros. Records released Reach for the Truth: The Best of the Reprise Years (2002), an anthology of her work during the previous thirty years. This was followed by BMG releasing The Best of Linda Lewis (2003), which included her hit singles. During 2003 she also appeared at the Glastonbury Festival, and was filmed by BBC Television when she appeared on the Jazz World Stage. She appeared again at the 2011 Festival.

Along with such musicians as Clem Curtis, Roy Phillips, and Glenn Tilbrook, Lewis collaborated with Lord Large, recording the song "Work it Out", which appeared on the 2007 album The Lord's First XI.

Her song "Old Smokey" was used by the rapper Common, on his single "Go!" (2005), which appeared on his album Be (2005). This was produced by Kanye West and reached No. 1 on the United States R&B and Hip Hop charts. She recorded Live in Old Smokey (2006), which featured new and previously released songs and toured the United Kingdom the same year. On 28 October 2006, The National Portrait Gallery opened an exhibit entitled Photographs 1965–2006, which featured a portrait by Lewis's former husband Jim Cregan and other sitters, such as Shirley Bassey. In 2007, she toured with the Soul Britannia All Stars in the United Kingdom, and on 3 February 2007, BBC Four featured performances by Lewis, in a sixty-minute recording of a Barbican show with the Soul Britannia All Stars. In June of the same year, she collaborated with Basement Jaxx on "Close Your Eyes", which featured in the Japanese anime film Vexille. In 2023, Lewis collaborated with UK folk-funk band The Paracosmos. Their single "Earthling" featured additional vocals by Lewis. The single was released in March 2023 and was debuted on Gilles Peterson's BBC 6 Music show where he proclaimed "Linda Lewis is back". The single would be her last release during her lifetime.

== Critical reception ==
Lewis is recognised as the first black British female singer-songwriter to enter the UK music charts. She went on to play at the 1971 Glastonbury Festival at the age of 20.

Lewis had a five-octave vocal range. Charles Waring of Blues & Soul magazine described her vocal range, as heard on The Best of Linda Lewis (2003), as "powerful". In her review of Lewis's album Second Nature (1995) for Allmusic, Amy Hanson described Lewis's voice as "remarkable and dynamic". Of Lewis's ability to sing in the whistle register, Hanson comments in her review of Lark (1972), "No longer a wild weapon that can soar from childlike lilt to screaming dog whistle without a moment's notice, she channels her range to the emotions it demands." Lewis's voice has also been compared to that of Mariah Carey. Reviewer Melissa Weber commented that her voice had similarities to that of Minnie Riperton, and that Lewis had "a wider vocal range [than Riperton], with the ability to sing in a lower register."

== Personal life and death ==
Lewis married fellow musician Jim Cregan in 1977, but after three years they divorced. Lewis later said: "We were apart too much – especially after Jim joined Rod Stewart's band – and we were both unfaithful." In 2004 she married music agent Neil Warnock. She was a member of SAG-AFTRA, Equity (UK) and Equity (Ireland). In her later years Lewis lived in Ramsgate in Kent.

Lewis died at her home in Waltham Abbey on 3 May 2023, at the age of 72. Singer-songwriter Joan Armatrading memorialised Lewis, saying "She had a beautiful voice and was a really lovely person." Tracey Thorn from Everything But The Girl and radio DJ Gilles Peterson also paid tribute. Cat Stevens tweeted: "I'm so sorry to hear of Linda Lewis passing. She was a good soul-friend and fine artist", adding that Lewis was like "an amazing bird that kindly visited the window sill of our earthly house for a few days, then flew away back to her garden".

On 27 September 2024, on what would have been her 74th birthday, a blue plaque was unveiled to commemorate Lewis at her former home of 33A Arlington Mansions, Sutton Court Road, Chiswick London. It was where she wrote her album Lark.

== Discography ==
=== Studio albums ===
Year	Album	Label	UK
1971	Say No More	Reprise	—
1972	Lark	Reprise	—
1973	Fathoms Deep	Raft	—
1975	Not a Little Girl Anymore	Arista	40
1977	Woman Overboard	Arista	—
1979	Hacienda View	Ariola	—
1983	A Tear and a Smile	Epic	—
1995	Second Nature	Sony	—
1997	Whatever...	Turpin	—
1999	Kiss of Life	Turpin	—
"—" denotes releases that did not chart.

=== Live albums ===
- Born Performer: Live in Japan (Sony, 1996)
- Live in Old Smokey (Market Place, 2006)
- Hampstead Days (The BBC Recordings) (Troubadour, 2014)

=== Collaboration ===
- Have You Noticed? Ludmilla featuring Linda Lewis (Reprise, 1993)

=== Compilations ===
- Heart Strings (Reprise, 1974)
- The Best of Linda Lewis (BMG, 1996)
- Best of Linda Lewis (Camden, 1997)
- Reach for the Truth: Best of the Reprise Years 1971–74 (Rhino, 2002)
- Legends (BMG, 2005)
- Hampstead Days (Troubadour, previously unreleased 1970s sessions and concert material, 2014)
- Moon & I (Soundtrack of the animated film, Dick Deadeye - GML.1018) 1975.

=== Singles ===
Year	Single	Peak chart positions				
Year	Single	UK	IRE	ITA	US R&B	US Dance
1967	"You Turned My Bitter into Sweet"	―	―	―	―	―
1971	"We Can Win"	―	―	―	―	―
1972	"Old Smokey"	―	―	―	―	―
1973	"Reach for the Truth"	―	―	―	―	―
1973	"Rock-a-Doodle-Doo"	15	―	―	―	―
1973	"Play Around"	53 (Note: Chart position is from the official UK "Breakers List".)	―	―	―	―
1974	"Sideway Shuffle"	58	―	―	―	―
1974	"(Remember the Days of) The Old Schoolyard"	―	―	―	―	―
1975	"It's in His Kiss"	6	9	19	96	11
1975	"Rock and Roller Coaster"	53	―	―	―	―
1976	"Baby I'm Yours"	33	―	―	―	―
1976	"This Time I'll Be Sweeter"	51	―	―	―	―
1976	"Winter Wonderland"	―	―	―	―	―
1977	"Come Back and Finish What You Started"	―	―	―	―	―
1977	"Can't We Just Sit Down and Talk It Over"	―	―	―	―	―
1978	"It's Good"	―	―	―	―	―
1979	"I'd Be Surprisingly Good for You"	40	―	―	―	―
1979	"109, Jamaica Highway"	―	―	―	―	―
1980	"Sleeping Like a Baby Now"	―	―	―	―	―
1982	"Why Can't I Be the Other Woman"	―	―	―	―	―
1983	"This Boy"	―	―	―	―	―
1983	"(Close the Door) Take Your Heart"	―	―	―	―	―
1984	"Class/Style (I've Got It)"	120	―	―	―	―
2000	"Reach Out" (Midfield General featuring Linda Lewis)	61	―	―	―	―
2023	"Earthling" (The Paracosmos with Linda Lewis)	—	―	―	―	―
"—" denotes releases that did not chart or were not released in that territory.

== Notes ==
Linda Lewis had several other vinyl singles released in the UK. These include: “The Moon and I”, from the Arista album of the same name, and “That’s Love (Habanera)”, produced by Mike Batt and released in 1980 on the Ariola record label.

== Additional sources ==
- Joynson, Vernon (2006). The Tapestry of Delights: The Comprehensive Guide to British Music of the Beat, R&B, Psychedelic and Progressive Eras 1963–1976. Borderline. ISBN 1-899855-15-7.
- Roberts, David (2006). British Hit Singles & Albums (19th ed.). Guinness World Records Limited. ISBN 1-904994-10-5.
