= Jim Cregan =

English rock guitarist and bassist (born 1946)

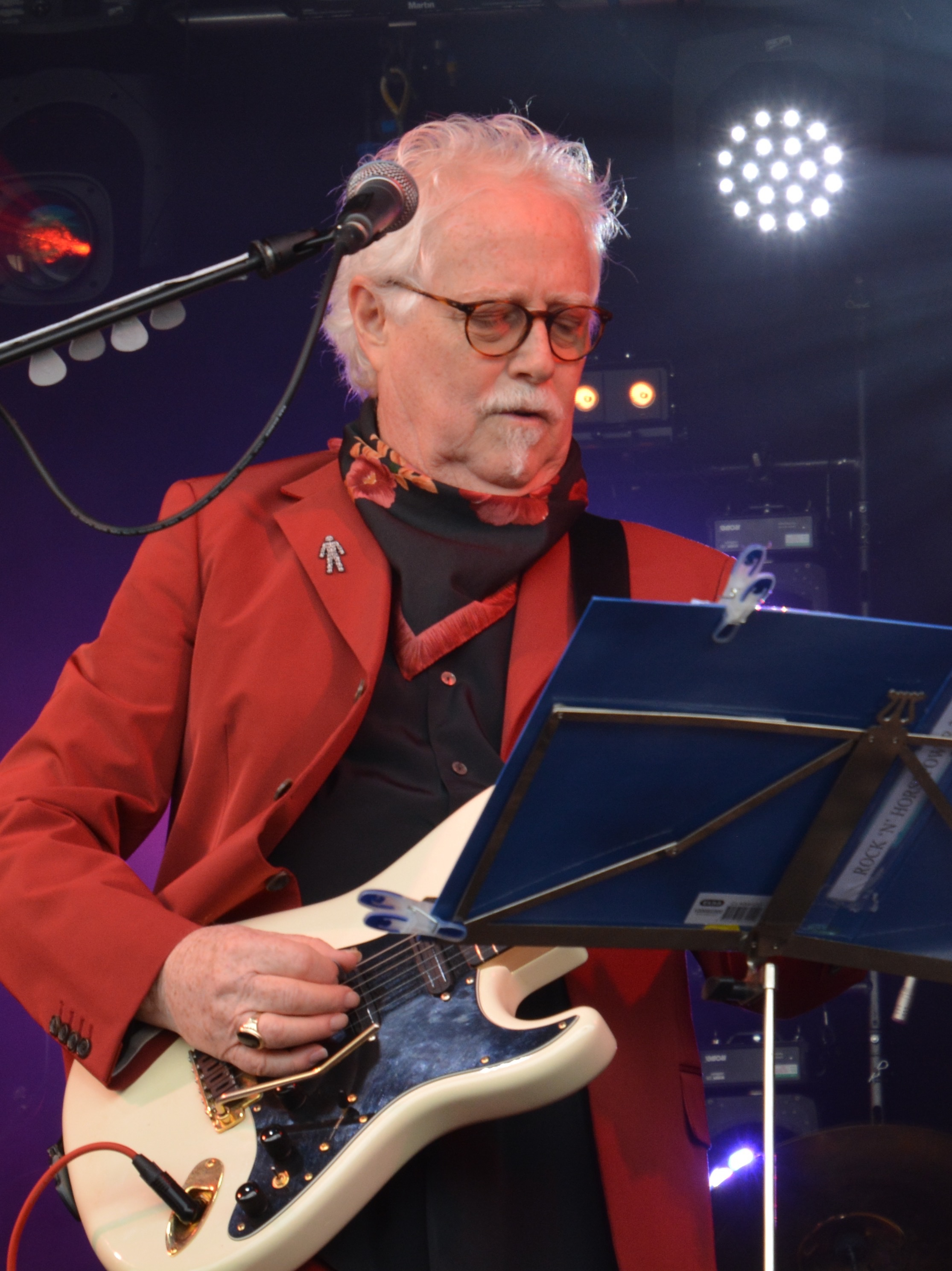
- Cregan in 2016

Background information
- Also known as: Jim Cregan
- Born: James Cregan; 9 March 1946 (age 80)
- Origin: Yeovil, Somerset, England
- Occupations: Musician, guitarist, songwriter
- Instruments: Guitar, bass, vocals
- Years active: 1960s–present
- Website: jimcregan.com

James Cregan (born 9 March 1946) is an English rock guitarist and bassist, best known for his associations with Family, Steve Harley & Cockney Rebel, and Rod Stewart. Cregan is a former husband of the singer Linda Lewis and worked with her as a record producer. He has also worked with The Quireboys, Glass Tiger, Katie Melua and formed Farm Dogs with Bernie Taupin.

== Career ==
Cregan was born in Yeovil, Somerset, to Irish parents. When he was 14, he joined The Falcons, formed whilst he was at Poole Grammar School. After developing his next band The Disastisfied Blues Band, Cregan briefly joined with future Traffic frontman Dave Mason, in Julian Covay and the Machine in 1967 and moved on to join the rock and soul band The Ingoes as a vocalist and guitarist. This band soon morphed into the psychedelic Blossom Toes the same year, who later turned to guitar-led rock.

After recording Julie Driscoll's solo album 1969, Cregan joined the soft rock band Stud. The group featured Cregan, John Weider from Family, and also John Wilson and Richard McCracken, the rhythm section from Taste (best known as Rory Gallagher's pre-solo power trio). Stud dissolved when Cregan moved to Family in September 1972, after recording two albums which were released in Germany, where they had their largest audience. He joined Charlie Whitney and Roger Chapman, replacing bassist John Wetton, adapting from rhythm guitar to bass guitar. He toured North America with the band, as the support act for Elton John, in the autumn of 1972. Family recorded two singles and a final album It's Only a Movie (1973). A tour of the UK in the autumn of the same year preceded the demise of the band. Cregan was then briefly reunited with Chapman and Whitney on Chapman Whitney Streetwalkers (1974).

He went on to work with British soul singer Linda Lewis, whom he would later marry. Cregan appears on four of her albums, also assuming a production role on Lark (1972), Fathoms deep (1973) and Not A Little Girl Anymore (1975), which gave him the opportunity to work with the Tower of Power horn section.

In October 1974 Cregan was recruited as a guitarist by Steve Harley, as a member of a re-formed Cockney Rebel. Harley and his new Cockney Rebel line-up recorded "Make Me Smile (Come Up and See Me)" (1975) at Abbey Road Studios. The song rose to No. 1 in the UK Singles Chart during 1975. It eventually rose to No. 1 in Europe and Australia as well and featured a guitar break by Cregan, widely believed to have been recorded during a soundcheck. However Cregan's acoustic guitar break was recorded late at night in Abbey Road Studios in several takes. In 1976 he joined Rod Stewart's band and became Stewart's musical director, co-producer and co-writer.

Cregan co-wrote many hits with Stewart, including "Passion" and "Tonight I'm Yours (Don't Hurt Me)", winning the American Society of Composers, Authors and Publishers (ASCAP) award for outstanding songwriting, with each. Cregan was awarded a third ASCAP "outstanding songwriting" award for his co-writing of the song "Forever Young" (1988) and Stewart was awarded a Grammy Award for his performance of this song. He stayed with Stewart until 1995 after twelve years working together. Cregan has received thirteen multi-platinum awards for his work with Stewart and together they have thirty recorded songs to their joint credit.

In 1990 he spent time writing and producing heavy rock band The Quireboys's A Bit of What You Fancy (1990) which gave him singles chart success and Canadian rockers Glass Tiger, who achieved international success and platinum selling albums. They were also awarded three Juno Awards, received in Canada. In 1993 Cregan was reunited with Stewart to record Unplugged...and Seated which was also filmed by MTV and featured a guest appearance by Ronnie Wood. This recording became Platinum three times in both USA and Canada. In the same year Cregan recorded Van Morrison's song "Have I Told You Lately" (1993) with Stewart, which became a number 1 hit in UK and had top twenty success elsewhere. Cregan's biggest concert appearance with Stewart was on 31 December 1994 at Copacabanain Rio de Janeiro, where they appeared in front of a total estimated audience of over 3.5 million. The Guinness Book of World Records states that this was "the staging of the largest outdoor concert in history".

In 1995, he moved on to form Farm Dogs with Elton John's lyricist Bernie Taupin and they released two albums. During 1997, Cregan started to work with Windham Hill Records as both a producer and musician. Over the next four years he worked as producer and musician with artists such as Janis Ian, Kathleen Keane, Peabo Bryson, Cat Stevens, W.G Snuffy Walden, Grand Drive, Gaelic Storm and Joe Cocker. His work achieved top five hits in different charts and several more platinum selling records. He recorded two platinum selling albums with Katie Melua, Call off the Search (2003) and Piece By Piece (2005), he has also toured extensively with her. Cregan was re-united with Roger Chapman in 2005, at first for live performances and then to produce Chapman's solo album One More Time For Peace (2007).

In 2008, Cregan formed Creative Music Management with music business lawyer Robert W. Allan. Together they managed singer songwriter, Charlie Hole. Hole's first album, The Joy of a Caged Bird, was released in December 2012 on Cocomack Records. In 2011, he formed his own band, Cregan & Co. This gave him the opportunity to perform the songs he had written, recorded and co-produced with Rod Stewart. In January 2013, Roger Chapman reformed Family for two concerts in London at the Shepherd's Bush Empire, coinciding with Family winning Classic Rock magazine's "Spirit of Progressive Rock" Award. On 13 September 2015, Cregan joined Rod Stewart on stage at the BBC Radio 2 "Live in Hyde Park, London Festival" and joined Family for the group's final shows in late 2016, as part of a line up which only featured Chapman, Poli Palmer and Cregan's work with the band.

In 2019, Cregan released his autobiography And on Guitar... for which Stewart wrote the foreword. Along with broadcaster Alex Dyke and Spandau Ballet singer Tony Hadley, he began a podcast in 2020 called Stars Cars Guitars, which is also hosted on a YouTube channel.

== Discography ==
With Mike Batt

- Tarot Suite (1979)
- Waves (1980)

With Blossom Toes

- We Are Ever So Clean (1967)
- If Only for a Moment (1969)

With Roger Chapman

- One More Time For Peace (Mystic, 2007)

With Rita Coolidge

- Love Lessons (Alfa, 1992)

With Julie Driscoll

- 1969 (1971)

With David Essex

- Cover Shot (Polygram, 1993)

With Family

- It's Only a Movie (1973)

With Farm Dogs

- Last Stand in Open Country (1996)
- Immigrant Sons (1998)

With Steve Harley

- Hobo with a Grin (EMI, 1978)
- Yes You Can (CTE, 1992)
- Uncovered (Absolute, 2020)

With Steve Harley & Cockney Rebel

- The Best Years of Our Lives (EMI, 1975)
- Timeless Flight (EMI, 1976)
- Love's a Prima Donna (EMI, 1976)

With Murray Head

- Say It Ain't So (Island, 1976)
- Between Us (Phillips, 1979)

With Janis Ian

- God and the FBI (Windham Hill, 2000)

With Yusuf Islam

- Tea for the Tillerman 2 (Island, 2020)

With Linda Lewis

- Lark (1972)
- Fathoms Deep (1973)
- Not a Little Girl Anymore (1975)
- Woman Overboard (1977)

With Katie Melua

- Call off the Search (Dramatico, 2003)
- Piece by Piece (Dramatico, 2005)

With The Quireboys

- A Bit of What You Fancy (1990)

With Bruce Roberts

- Bruce Roberts (1978)

With Rod Stewart

- Foot Loose & Fancy Free (Warner Bros., 1977)
- Blondes Have More Fun (Warner Bros., 1978)
- Foolish Behaviour (Riva, 1980)
- Tonight I'm Yours (Riva, 1981)
- Body Wishes (Warner Bros., 1983)
- Camouflage (Warner Bros., 1984)
- Every Beat of My Heart (Warner Bros., 1986)
- Out of Order (Warner Bros., 1988)
- Vagabond Heart (Warner Bros., 1991)
- A Spanner in the Works (Warner Bros., 1995)
- Time (Capitol, 2013)

With Streetwalkers

- Chapman Whitney Streetwalkers (1974)

With Stud

- September (1972)
- Goodbye Live at Command (1973)

With Roger Taylor

- Happiness? (Parlophone, 1994)

With Glass Tiger

- Air Time: The Best of Glass Tiger (1993)

With various artists

- Tribute to Curtis Mayfield with Rod Stewart (1994)

== Music videos ==
Year	Song	Album	Director(s)
2012	Hot Legs	'Cregan & Co'	Simeon Lumgair

== Personal life ==
Cregan was married to Linda Lewis for five years. He later married Hollywood model Jane Booke and lived in Los Angeles. On Steve Harley's BBC Radio 2 show aired in January 2004, he explained that he had grown tired of Los Angeles culture and moved back to the U.K.
