= Family discography =

- Studio albums: 7
- Live albums: 5
- Compilation albums: 10
- Singles: 14

This is a discography of the rock band Family. They have released 7 studio albums, 5 live albums, 10 compilation albums and 14 singles.

== Albums ==
=== Studio albums ===
Year	Album details	Peak positions		
Year	Album details	UK	US	NOR
1968	Music in a Doll's House: Released: July 1968; Label: UK Reprise (RSLP-6312) US Reprise (RS-6212); Format: LP, CD	35	—	—
1969	Family Entertainment: Released: March 1969; Label: UK Reprise (RSLP-6340) US Reprise (RS-6340); Format: LP, CD	6	—	—
1970	A Song for Me: Released: January 1970; Label: UK Reprise (RSLP-9001) US Reprise (RS-6384); Format: LP, CD	4	—	—
1970	Anyway: Released: November 1970; Label: UK Reprise (RSX-9005) US United Artists (UAS-5527); Format: LP, CD	7	—	18
1971	Fearless: Released: October 1971; Label: UK Reprise (K-54003) US United Artists (UAS-5562); Format: LP, CD	14	177	—
1972	Bandstand: Released: September 1972; Label: UK Reprise (K-54006) US United Artists (UAS-5644); Format: LP, CD	15	183	—
1973	It's Only a Movie: Released: September 1973; Label: UK Raft (RA-58501) US United Artists (#UA-LA181-F); Format: LP, CD	30	—	—
"—" denotes releases that did not chart.

=== Live albums ===
Year	Album details	Peak positions	
Year	Album details	UK	US
1991	BBC Radio 1 in Concert	—	—
2003	Family Live	—	—
2004	BBC Volume 1: 1968–1969	—	—
2004	BBC Volume 2: 1971–1973	—	—
2009	BBC Volume 3: 1970	—	—
"—" denotes releases that did not chart.

=== Compilation albums ===
Year	Title	Chart positions	
Year	Title	UK	US
1971	Old Songs New Songs	—	—
1974	Best of Family	—	—
1980	From the Archives	—	—
1981	The Very Best of Family	—	—
1989	Peel Sessions	—	—
1990	Best of Family	—	—
1992	A's & B's	—	—
2000	A Family Selection	—	—
2002	The Best of Family & Friends	—	—
2005	In Their Own Time	—	—
2013	History	—	—
"—" denotes releases that did not chart.

== Singles ==
Year	Title	Peak Positions		
Year	Title	UK	US	AUS
1967	"Scene Through the Eye of a Lens" "Gypsy Woman"	—	—	—
1968	"Me My Friend" "Hey Mr. Policeman"	—	—	—
1968	"Old Songs, New Songs" "Hey, Mr. Policeman"	—	—	—
1968	"Second Generation Woman" "Hometown"	—	—	—
1969	"No Mule's Fool" "Good Friend of Mine"	29	—	—
1970	"Today" "Song For Lots"	—	—	—
1970	"Strange Band" (EP) (includes a new version of "The Weaver's Answer")	11	— (Note: The "Strange Band" three-song EP was allocated three matrix numbers by Atlantic Records for release in 1970, although no single was ever issued on Atlantic or on any of their labels. The three songs were "The Weaver's Answer", "Hung Up Down" and "Strange Band".)	—
1971	"In My Own Time" (Note: The single "In My Own Time" was included in the U.S. version of Anyway (United Artists, 1971).) "Seasons"	4	—	86
1971	"Larf & Sing" "Between Blue and Me"	—	—	—
1972	"Burlesque" "The Rockin' R's"	13	—	—
1972	"My Friend the Sun" "Glove"	—	—	—
1973	"Boom Bang" "Stop This Car"	—	—	—
1973	"Sweet Desiree" "Drink To You"	—	—	—
1973	"It's Only a Movie" "Suspicion"	—	—	—
"—" denotes releases that did not chart or were not released in that territory.
