= Old Songs New Songs =

Compilation album by Family
- Released: March 1971
- Recorded: 1968–1971
- Genres: Progressive rock, psychedelic rock
- Length: 38:52
- Label: Reprise (UK) RMP 9007
- Producer: Various producers

Family chronology
Anyway (1970)	Old Songs New Songs (1971)	Fearless (1971)

Professional ratings
Review scores
Source	Rating
Allmusic	3/5 stars

Old Songs New Songs is a budget-priced compilation album by the British progressive rock band Family, released in March 1971. The title is taken from the title of a song that appeared on the band's 1968 debut album Music in a Doll's House, although that song does not appear on this record.

Highlights of this package were songs previously released on 45 rpm records only (marked by an asterisk) and four tracks from the sessions of their second album "Family Entertainment" partially re-recorded and remixed for this release. Those four tracks are: "Observations From a Hill" with Roger Chapman on lead vocals, rather than Jim King as featured on the original release, "Hung Up Down", "Weaver's Answer" and the single B-side "Hometown". Roger Chapman and Charlie Whitney were quoted in ZigZag magazine (reprinted in both the interview anthology book "The Road To Rock", and also the "Old Songs New Songs" cd box set which includes this album) stating how they disliked the mix of the album Family Entertainment, where most of these songs originally appeared. So they re-recorded a number of vocals and elements and remixed those tracks for this release.

The album sleeve is the same both sides only the front is positive and the rear in negative black and white. Designed by Stuart Weston.

It was released as a stereo album on the Reprise label (RMP 9007) at a special low price, Tony Gourvish had replaced John Gilbert as manager and Gilbert's old Dukeslodge management company had been replaced by the new Bradgate Bush company. The album was not issued in the US, although it was a popular import.

In Argentina the album was released with a different tracklist.

== Track listing ==
All tracks written by John "Charlie" Whitney and Roger Chapman except where noted.

Side one
No.	Title	Notes	Length
1.	"Hung Up Down"	Remix/rerecorded track from Family Entertainment. The remix here features guitar overdubs.	3:30
2.	"Today" (Whitney, Chapman, Weider)	45 A side	4:57
3.	"Observations from a Hill"	Remix/rerecorded track from Family Entertainment featuring Roger Chapman's lead vocals instead of Jim King's.	3:00
4.	"Good Friend of Mine"	Stereo mix of 45 B side; original single was mono	3:32
5.	"Drowned in Wine"	From A Song for Me	4:05

Side two
No.	Title	Notes	Length
1.	"Peace of Mind"	From Music in a Doll's House	2:22
2.	"Hometown"	Remix/rerecorded track originally released as a 45 B-side, recorded during the Family Entertainment sessions. The remix includes vibraphone; the original single mix does not.	3:09
3.	"The Cat and the Rat"	From A Song for Me	2:29
4.	"No Mule's Fool"	Stereo mix of 45 A side; original mono single included studio chatter at start	3:15
5.	"See Through Windows"	From Music in a Doll's House	3:43
6.	"The Weaver's Answer"	Remix/rerecorded track from Family Entertainment. The remix here features guitar overdubs.	4:50

- Note: "Peace Of Mind" is incorrectly listed as 3:00 on the original LP label.

== Personnel ==
- John Weider - bass, violin
- John Whitney - guitar
- Poli Palmer - keyboards
- Rob Townsend - drums, percussion
- Roger Chapman - vocals
- Ric Grech - bass, cello
- Jim King - saxophone, harmonica
