= Burlesque (song) =

Single by Family

from the album Bandstand
- B-side: "The Rocking R's"
- Released: 1972
- Recorded: 1972
- Studio: Olympic Studios, London
- Genre: Jazz rock, progressive rock, hard rock
- Length: 4:04
- Label: Reprise
- Songwriters: Chapman, Whitney
- Producers: Family, George Chkiantz

Family singles chronology
"Song for Lots" (1971)	"Burlesque" (1972)	"My Friend the Sun" (1972)

Official audio
- "Burlesque" (2023 Remaster) on YouTube

"Burlesque" is a song written by Roger Chapman and John Whitney and performed by English rock band Family.

It was first released as a single by the Reprise Records in 1972 and entered the UK singles chart in September, reaching number 13 and staying for twelve weeks on the chart.

It is the opening track on Family's 1972 album Bandstand.

== Personnel ==
- Roger Chapman – lead vocals
- Charlie Whitney – guitars
- Poli Palmer – keyboards
- John Wetton – basses, backing vocals, guitars
- Rob Townsend – drums, percussion
