= My Friend the Sun =

- Cover to the 1982 release

Single by Family

from the album Bandstand
- B-side: Glove
- Released: December 8, 1972 (UK)
- Recorded: 1972
- Studio: Olympic Studios, London
- Genre: Progressive rock
- Length: 4:20
- Label: Reprise (UK), United Artists (US)
- Songwriters: Roger Chapman; Charlie Whitney
- Producers: Family; George Chkiantz

Family singles chronology
"Burlesque" (1972)	"My Friend the Sun" (1972)	"Boom Bang" (1973)

Official audio
- "My Friend the Sun" on YouTube

"My Friend the Sun" is a song by the British rock band Family. It was written by Roger Chapman and Charlie Whitney for the band's 1972 album Bandstand. The single did not make the UK Singles Chart.

It was later released on the Strange Band: The Best of Family album and A's & B's album. In 1976 Record World called the song a "Family favourite" alongside "Burlesque." Both songs were later released together by Rebecca Records on 22 January 1982, with "Burlesque" as the A-side and "My Friend the Sun" as the B-side.

== Reviews ==
Record Mirror said of the song that "(It is) Family's second single from their ' 'Bandstand' ' album (to be) released. It is their gentle song...a notable contrast to Burlesque, which gave the group one of their biggest British hits." Bob McBeath (Easy Livin) of Prog Archives said "'My Friend the Sun' was perhaps too different to their previous releases to succeed as a single. The song is a soft acoustic ballad with CSN like harmonies, and accordion backing." Lorenzo Galbiati (jamesbaldwin) also of Prog Archives said "'My Friend the Sun' is a prog-folk song (vote 8+) with in the foreground the voice of Chapman, here splendidly delicate, tender, and the acoustic guitar. Wetton sings the harmony vocals. The song is simple but very inspired.", and Only Solitaire said that "'My Friend The Sun' is a guitar/accordion ballad with a very pretty and friendly sound".

== Track listing ==
December 1972 7" vinyl single release

1. "My Friend the Sun" - 4:20
2. "Glove" - 4:53

January 1982 7" vinyl single release

1. Burlesque - 4:04
2. "My Friend the Sun" - 4:20

== Personnel ==
- Roger Chapman – lead vocals, percussion
- Charlie Whitney – guitars
- Poli Palmer – accordion
- John Wetton – basses, backing vocals
- Rob Townsend – drums, percussion

== Cover versions ==
The song has been covered by Linda Lewis for her 1977 album Woman Overboard and by Jimmy Nail for his 1999 album Tadpoles in a Jar. "My Friend the Sun" was also covered by Peter Holsapple and Chris Stamey of the North Carolina band the dB's on their 2009 duo album Here and Now.
