= He Was... She Was... You Was... We Was... =

Live album by Roger Chapman and The Shortlist
- Released: October 1982
- Recorded: Recorded on the Rüssl Mobile during the Chappo Live'81 tour of Germany Nov/Dec 1981
- Genre: Rock
- Length: 89:17
- Label: Mazedor
- Producer: Roger Chapman

Roger Chapman and The Shortlist chronology
Hyenas Only Laugh for Fun (1981)	He Was... She Was... You Was... We Was... (1982)	Swag (1983)

Professional ratings
Review scores
Source	Rating
Allmusic	4/5 stars

He Was... She Was... You Was... We Was... is a live album by former Family/Streetwalkers frontman Roger Chapman recorded during the Germany Live tour end of 1981 and released in 1982.

== Track listing ==
No.	Title	Writer(s)	Length
1.	"Higher Ground"	Chapman, Palmer	6:09
2.	"Ducking Down"	Chapman, Whitehorn	5:36
3.	"Making the Same Mistake"	Chapman, Whitehorn	5:42
4.	"Blood And Sand"	Chapman, Whitehorn	5:59
5.	"King Bee / That Same Thing / Face of Stone"	Slim Harpo / Muddy Waters / Chapman, Bobby Tench	9:03
6.	"Hyenas Only Laugh for Fun"	Chapman, Hinkley, Whitehorn	4:15
7.	"Night Down (A la ZZ)"	Chapman	9:43
8.	"Prisoner"	Chapman, Hinkley, Whitehorn	6:07
9.	"Slow Down / Common Touch"	Larry Williams / Chapman	6:32
10.	"Juke Box Mama No. 3"	Chapman, Troy Seals	6:22
11.	"He Was, She Was"	Chapman, Whitehorn	6:07
12.	"Stone Free incl. Bitches Brew"	Jimi Hendrix / Miles Davis	6:02
13.	"Unknown Soldier - Reprise"	Chapman	5:48
14.	"I Just Wanna Make Love to You"	Willie Dixon	5:45

== Personnel ==
- Roger Chapman — vocals, harmonica
- Boz Burrell — bass
- Tim Hinkley — piano, organ, vocals
- Poli Palmer — synthesizer (CMI Fairlight), vibraphone
- Nick Pentelow — saxophone
- Steve Simpson — guitar, mandolin, violin, vocals
- Leonard "Stretch" Stretching — drums
- Geoff Whitehorn — guitar, vocals
