= Chapman Whitney Streetwalkers =

Studio album by Chapman Whitney
- Released: May 1974
- Studios: Island, Olympic, Air Studios, London
- Genres: Blues rock, classic rock
- Length: 40:15
- Label: Reprise
- Producers: Charlie Whitney, Roger Chapman

Professional ratings
Review scores
Source	Rating
AllMusic	3/5 stars
Robert Christgau	C+

Streetwalkers is an album recorded by Roger Chapman and Charlie Whitney released in 1974, following the dissolution of their band Family in 1973. The musicians credited on this album include other former members of Family and evolved into the band called Streetwalkers.

== Track listing ==
All tracks composed by Roger Chapman and Charlie Whitney

No.	Title	Length
1.	"Parisienne High Heels"	4:04
2.	"Roxianna"	3:46
3.	"Systematic Stealth"	2:24
4.	"Call Ya"	6:32
5.	"Creature Feature"	4:14
6.	"Sue and Betty Jean"	5:08
7.	"Showbiz Joe"	4:07
8.	"Just Four Men"	2:50
9.	"Tokyo Rose"	2:26
10.	"Hangman"	4:44

== Personnel ==
- Roger Chapman — vocals, percussion
- John Wetton, Rick Grech — bass
- Godfrey MacLean — congas
- Ian Wallace, Michael Giles — drums
- Charlie Whitney, Neil Hubbard — guitar
- Max Middleton, Tim Hinkley — keyboards
- Jim Cregan, John Wetton, Linda Lewis, Tim Hinkley — backing vocals
- Mel Collins — bass clarinet, clarinet, saxophone
- Del Newman - string arrangements

Technical

- George Chkiantz - engineer
- John Kosh - cover design
- Tony Evans - photography
