= No Mule's Fool =

Song by the band Family

No Mule's Fool is a song by the British progressive rock band Family released in October 1969. It was the group's first single to chart in the United Kingdom, reaching number 29.

== Lyrics ==
As written by group leaders Roger Chapman and John "Charlie" Whitney, "No Mule's Fool" is a country-influenced rock song about a boy and his mule taking it easy on a hot day. The boy lies on the grass, daydreaming and concentrating on the only audible sound in proximity - the buzzing of a honeybee. With the temperature at 95 degrees (35 °C), the boy and his mule prefer to enjoy the warmth of the day by relaxing. Aware that people think the boy and the mule - both of which are expected to be more industrious - are lazy, the boy admits as much, but adds, "But one day they're going to see / We're only doing what makes us happy." No Mule's Fool is a quirky, fascinating, perfect little summer song, unlike any other. The grass is a drugs reference and in my mind the immoveable mule is the creature the partaker becomes when stoned ("I take the grass, he hits the hay …"). We ask nothing more than to be left alone to "spend our lazy days and ways just turning on". A country and western influence appears in the coda when the music conjures up a Quixotian image of man and mule plodding off into the sunset. A work of art.

== Music ==
Charlie Whitney's acoustic guitar and a brief riff from the soprano saxophone of Jim King provide a pleasant backdrop, but the energy of the song is from the bass of John Weider, playing as a member of Family on record for the first time. Weider also provides a lilting violin solo in the middle eight. The song fades out with a quickly paced jam, with plenty of "pickin' and grinnin'" country and western guitar from Whitney. Roger Chapman's relaxed vocals add to the gentle nature of the lyrics.

== Trivia ==
"No Mule's Fool" was not intended to appear on an album, but in the United States, Reprise Records placed it at the beginning of the U.S. edition of Family's 1970 album A Song For Me.

"No Mule's Fool" and its B-side, "Good Friend of Mine," were the last Family recordings to feature Jim King, who left the group shortly thereafter, as well as the first Family recordings to feature Weider.
