= Bandstand (album) =

Studio album by Family
- Released: 15 September 1972
- Recorded: 1972
- Studios: Olympic Studios, London
- Genres: Progressive rock, psychedelic rock, hard rock
- Length: 37:43
- Labels: Reprise (UK), United Artists (US)
- Producers: Family, George Chkiantz

Family chronology
Fearless (1971)	Bandstand (1972)	It's Only a Movie (1973)

Professional ratings
Review scores
Source	Rating
AllMusic	4.5/5.0 stars
Christgau's Record Guide	B+
Encyclopedia of Popular Music	4/5 stars
Uncut	3/5 stars

Bandstand is the sixth studio album by the British progressive rock band Family. Released in 1972, it was their second and last album to chart in the United States. The original album cover was die-cut in the shape of a Bush TV22 television set, with a black-and-white image of the band onscreen.

== Background ==
Bandstand marked a notable change of direction for the band. Family's sound had become more mainstream and somewhat more conventional. By Roger Chapman's own admission, he and Charlie Whitney were getting more standardised in their songwriting, relying more on choruses and regular verse structure. Their sound was brought closer to the mainstream by British soul singer Linda Lewis contributing backing vocals, and Del Newman string arrangements.

Bandstand opened with "Burlesque", a straight rocker about a bar of that name in Chapman and Whitney's hometown of Leicester, England. Released as a single in the UK, it got up to number thirteen on the UK Singles Chart. Heavier songs on Bandstand included "Broken Nose", an angry sexual rant involving the British class structure, and "Ready To Go", a swipe at Family's detractors in the British rock press. Family also were becoming more adept with introspective tunes like "Coronation", about an apartment dweller ruminating about his neighbours and his own dishevelled flat, and "Dark Eyes," an atmospheric, sensual ballad Chapman wrote with Poli Palmer. Many Family fans cited "Glove", a soulful power ballad about meeting a woman through an act of chivalry, as one of their best songs ever. "My Friend the Sun", a straight acoustic ballad, displayed a tenderness previously absent in Chapman's vocal style. It was also issued as a single in the UK, but did not chart.

Bandstand was the last Family album to feature John Wetton. Having joined the band only a year earlier and being a large vocal and instrumental presence on Fearless, Wetton's role in the band was reduced on Bandstand, and he left to join King Crimson. He was replaced by Jim Cregan, and the group toured North America with Elton John immediately after Bandstand's release. They received favourable exposure from American critics and radio DJs and built up a small but loyal cult following in the US as a result.

Bandstand is the only Family album not to feature an instrumental track. Spectacles Records issued a glow-in-the-dark vinyl picture disc version of this album, the album reissued as a double with the Family compilation "Old Songs, New Songs" on sepia-coloured translucent vinyl. This rare double album, in a clear plastic sleeve, regularly reaches up to $4,000 when it turns up at auction.

== Track listing ==
All selections are by Charlie Whitney and Roger Chapman except where noted.

No.	Title	Writer(s)	Length
1.	"Burlesque"		4:04
2.	"Bolero Babe"		4:24
3.	"Coronation"	Whitney, Chapman, Wetton	3:49
4.	"Dark Eyes"	Chapman, Palmer	1:48
5.	"Broken Nose"		4:09
6.	"My Friend the Sun"		4:20
7.	"Glove"		4:53
8.	"Ready To Go"		4:35
9.	"Top of the Hill"		5:41

- Note: "Bolero Babe is incorrectly listed as 4:11 on original LP labels.

The CD release on Mystic Records also contains the following bonus tracks:
No.	Title	Length
10.	"The Rockin Rs" (original B-side of "Burlesque")
11.	"No Mule's Fool" (live)
12.	"Good News – Bad News" (live)
13.	"The Weaver's Answer" (live)

The 2013 "Deluxe" CD release contains the following bonus tracks:
No.	Title	Length
10.	"My Friend the Sun" (Demo)
11.	"Glove" (Demo)
12.	"Coronation" (Demo)
13.	"Bolero Babe" (Demo)

== Personnel ==
=== Family ===
- Roger Chapman – lead vocals, percussion, soprano saxophone (2)
- Charlie Whitney – guitars, keyboards (2)
- Poli Palmer – keyboards, vibes, flute, percussion, guitar (4)
- John Wetton – basses, backing vocals, guitars
- Rob Townsend – drums, percussion

=== Guest artists ===
- Linda Lewis – backing vocals (5)
- Del Newman – string arrangements

== Song cover versions ==
The song "My Friend the Sun" was later covered by Linda Lewis for her 1977 album Woman Overboard, with harmonica by Peter Hope Evans and keyboards by Max Middleton. It was also covered by Peter Holsapple and Chris Stamey of the North Carolina band the dB's on their 2009 duo album Here and Now.

== Charts ==
Chart (1972)	Peak position
UK Albums (Official Charts)	15
US Billboard 200	183
