= Axis Point =

English rock band (1978–1980)

- Origin: England
- Genres: Rock, blues rock, melodic rock
- Years active: 1978–1980
- Label: RCA
- Past members: John "Charlie" Whitney; Eddie Hardin; Charlie McCracken; Les Binks; Rob Townsend; Bobby Tench

Axis Point/Boast of the Town
- Axis Point/Boast of the Town re-issue 2003

Studio album by Axis Point
- Released: 2003
- Recorded: 1979
- Genre: Rock
- Labels: RCA, BGO
- Producer: Axis Point

Axis Point chronology
Boast of the Town (1980)	''Axis Point/Boast of the Town'' (2003)

Professional ratings
Review scores
Source	Rating
Allmusic	(4.25/5)

Axis Point was an English rock band. The band signed to RCA and released two albums in a twelve-month period, with a line-up including an eclectic mix of well known musicians of that time. They disbanded in 1980, after releasing their second album.

== History ==
The original line-up of Axis Point included, guitarist John "Charlie" Whitney, keyboardist Eddie Hardin, bassist Charlie McCracken and drummer Les Binks. They recorded Axis Point (1979). The songwriting on the album is split between Hardin and Whitney with McCraken co-writing "Woman of the world" and "Fire it up". After the recording of this album, Binks left and was replaced by Rob Townsend, who had been the drummer for Family. They recorded their second album Boast of the Town (1980). On this album Hardin and Whitney collaborate on most of the songs and added guitarist and vocalist Bobby Tench, who had previously been a member of Streetwalkers.

== Band members ==
Axis Point #1

- Charlie Whitney (guitar)
- Charlie McCracken (bass)
- Eddie Hardin (keyboards, vocals)
- Les Binks (drums)

Axis Point #2

- Charlie Whitney (guitar)
- Charlie McCracken (bass)
- Eddie Hardin (keyboards, vocals)
- Rob Townsend (drums)

=== Additional musicians ===
- Bobby Tench (on Boast of the Town) – Guitar, vocals
- Colin Horton Jennings – backing vocals
- Ron Asprey – sax
- Tony Cox – String Arrangements

== Discography ==
Original releases

- Axis Point RCA 30039 (1978)
- Boast of the Town RCA 25277 (1980)

=== Re-issues ===
Axis Point/Boast of the Town compilation

- BGO 576 (2002)
- BGO Records 576 (2003)
