= Chappo =

Chappo may refer to:

- Chappo, son of Apache leader Geronimo
- James Chapman (rower), Australian rower
- John Chapman (evangelist), Australian preacher
- Mark Chapman (cricketer), Hong Kong cricketer
- Mitchell Chapman, Australian rugby player
- Roger Chapman, English rock vocalist
  - Chappo (album), first album by Roger Chapman
- Chappo (band), an indie rock band signed with Majordomo Records
- Chappo, California 92055, place in San Diego County
