= Fearless (Family album) =

Studio album by Family
- Released: 29 October 1971
- Recorded: 1971
- Studios: Olympic Studios, London
- Genres: Progressive rock, psychedelic rock
- Length: 38:06
- Labels: Reprise (UK), United Artists (US)
- Producers: Family, George Chkiantz

Family chronology
| Old Songs New Songs (1971) | Fearless (1971) | Bandstand (1972) |

Professional ratings
Review scores
| Source | Rating |
|---|---|
| AllMusic | 3.5/5 stars |
| Christgau's Record Guide | B |
| Encyclopedia of Popular Music | 4/5 stars |
| Hi-Fi News & Record Review | A:1/2 |
| Uncut | 4/5 stars |

Fearless is the fifth album by the British progressive rock band Family, which was released on 29 October 1971, on Reprise Records in the UK and United Artists Records in the US. It is known for its innovative cover design by John Kosh, using layered-page album headshots of the band's members melding into a single blur.

== Background ==
After completing their second US tour in mid 1971, John Weider left the band and was replaced by John Wetton on bass and vocals. The band's direction was notably changed with Wetton bringing along his trademark propulsive performance style, as evidenced on the album opener "Between Blue and Me". After only a year and one more album, Wetton left to join the latest line-up of King Crimson and was replaced by Jim Cregan. Fearless was the first Family album to chart in the United States, reaching No. 177 on the Billboard 200 in March 1972, and staying on the charts for seven weeks.

A three-disc expanded edition, was released in September 2023. It includes tracks drawn from the "In My Own Time" single, period BBC Radio sessions (Bob Harris, Top Gear) and a BBC Radio One In Concert performance recorded on 28 December 1970.

== Reception ==
Writing in the US rock magazine Creem, reviewer Ed Ward, after admitting that he had not liked Family, called Fearless "a good, strong album, loaded with some of the most intense, high energy British rock and roll being made these days", but still rated it "not quite as good as Anyway" (which had not been released in the United States at that time). He dismissed tracks "Spanish Tide" and "Children" as "filler", but concluded that "what's left is fine indeed".

Jack Breschard, writing in Crawdaddy, went further and declared the album to be "nothing less than brilliant." He singled out Side One for particular praise, "being the catchiest album side I've heard in a very long time." He thought that much of the album's strength lay in "the multi-instrumentality of the band", adding that although the band's range was wide "no-one gets hung up in a bunch of musical pretensions."

AllMusic deemed the album "uneven", but noted that it had some strong highlights, such as "Spanish Tide", "Save Some for Thee", and "Take Your Partners", the last of which saw "the bandmembers maneuver their interaction with an aptitude and skill that would arguably best any jam-based aggregate of the day".

The New Musical Express authors Nick Logan and Bob Woffinden termed the album "peerless" among the competition of 1971, and their best since the second album, Entertainment.

== Track listing ==
All selections are by Roger Chapman and Charlie Whitney except where noted.

| No. | Title | Writer(s) | Length |
|---|---|---|---|
| 1. | "Between Blue and Me" | | 4:58 |
| 2. | "Sat'd'y Barfly" | | 4:02 |
| 3. | "Larf and Sing" | Palmer | 2:45 |
| 4. | "Spanish Tide" | | 4:00 |
| 5. | "Save Some for Thee" | | 3:45 |
| 6. | "Take Your Partners" | Whitney, Chapman, Palmer | 6:25 |
| 7. | "Children" | | 2:20 |
| 8. | "Crinkly Grin" (instrumental) | Palmer | 1:05 |
| 9. | "Blind" | | 4:02 |
| 10. | "Burning Bridges" | Whitney, Chapman, Palmer | 4:44 |

== Personnel ==
Family

- Roger Chapman – lead vocals, guitars, percussion
- Charlie Whitney – guitars, mandolin, percussion
- John "Poli" Palmer – keyboards, backing vocals, vibes, flute, percussion
- John Wetton – bass, backing and lead vocals, guitars, contracts, keyboards
- Rob Townsend – drums, paiste cymbals, percussion

Additional musicians

- The Ladbroke Horns – brass

Technical

- Family – producer
- George Chkiantz – producer

== Charts ==
| Chart (1971) | Peak position |
|---|---|
| UK Albums (Official Charts) | 14 |
| US Billboard 200 | 177 |
