= Bandstand (disambiguation) =

A bandstand is a circular or semi-circular structure.

Bandstand may also refer to:

- Bandstand (album), an album by the British band Family
- Bandstand (TV program), an Australian music television show which broadcast from 1958 to 1972
- Bandstand (musical), a Broadway musical which premiered in 2015
- "The Bandstand", a song on the 2009 album Foot of the Mountain by a-ha

== See also ==
- American Bandstand, an American music television show which broadcast from 1952 to 1989
- Bandstand Promenade, a popular seaside promenade in Bandra, a suburb of Mumbai
