= Mistreat (disambiguation) =

To mistreat is to abuse.

Mistreat and similar may also refer to:

- "Mistreated" (song), a song by Deep Purple from their 1974 album Burn
- "Mistreater", a song by Grace Slick from her 1981 album Welcome to the Wrecking Ball!
- "Mistreated", a song by Robert Chapman from his 1996 album Kiss My Soul
- Mistreatment (film), a 1969 Swedish film
