= Red Card (album) =

Studio album by Streetwalkers
- Released: May 1976
- Recorded: 1976
- Studio: Scorpio Sound, London
- Genre: Blues rock; hard rock
- Label: Vertigo (UK); Mercury (USA)
- Producer: Streetwalkers

Streetwalkers chronology
Downtown Flyers (1975)	Red Card (1976)	Vicious But Fair (1977)

Professional ratings
Review scores
Source	Rating
AllMusic	4.5/5 stars
Christgau's Record Guide	B
Martin C. Strong	5/10

Red Card was the third and most successful studio album by the UK rock group Streetwalkers, which made the Top 20 in the UK album charts. The album features the lineup of Roger Chapman, Charlie Whitney, Bobby Tench of the Jeff Beck Group and Hummingbird, Nicko McBrain, who later played drums with Iron Maiden, and bassist Jon Plotel. This groove-heavy album was released in the UK by Vertigo and in the United States by Mercury during 1976 and remains a much respected album by many.

== Track listing ==
All tracks composed by Roger Chapman and John "Charlie" Whitney; except where indicated

No.	Title	Writer(s)	Length
1.	"Run for Cover"		5:50
2.	"Me an' Me Horse an' Me Rum"	Roger Chapman, John "Charlie" Whitney, Bobby Tench	4:06
3.	"Crazy Charade"	Roger Chapman, John "Charlie" Whitney, Bobby Tench	5:32
4.	"Daddy Rolling Stone"	Otis Blackwell	3:17
5.	"Roll Up, Roll Up"		3:34
6.	"Shotgun Messiah"	Roger Chapman, John "Charlie" Whitney, Bobby Tench	4:52
7.	"Between Us"		3:52
8.	"Decadence Code"		6:41/ 9:11
Total length:			41:26

== Personnel ==
- Roger Chapman - lead and backing vocals, harmonica, percussion
- Charlie Whitney - guitar, keyboards, slide guitar
- Bob Tench (credited courtesy of A&M Records) - guitars, backing and lead vocals, keyboards, percussion
- Jon Plotel - bass, backing vocals
- Nicko McBrain - drums, percussion
- Uncle Al's Pals Choir - choir and chorus
- Wilfred Gibson - string arrangements on "Between Us"
