= It's Only a Movie =

Studio album by Family
- Released: 7 September 1973
- Recorded: Summer 1973
- Studios: Knowle Hall, Somerset, Olympic Studios, Air Studios
- Genres: Progressive rock, psychedelic rock
- Length: 39:06
- Labels: Raft Records (UK), United Artists (US)
- Producer: Family

Family chronology
Bandstand (1972)	It's Only a Movie (1973)

Professional ratings
Review scores
Source	Rating
AllMusic	3/5 stars
Christgau's Record Guide	B+
Hi-Fi News & Record Review	A:1
The Rolling Stone Record Guide	5/5 stars
Uncut	3/5 stars

It's Only a Movie is the seventh and final studio album by the British progressive rock band Family, released in 1973, and their last original studio album before they disbanded that year.

== Track listing ==
All selections by Whitney and Chapman except "Check Out" by Whitney, Chapman and Cregan.

Side one
No.	Title	Length
1.	"It's Only a Movie"	5:08
2.	"Leroy"	5:43
3.	"Buffet Tea for Two"	5:23
4.	"Boom Bang"	3:06

Side two
No.	Title	Writer(s)	Length
5.	"Boots 'n' Roots"		5:00
6.	"Banger" (instrumental)		3:07
7.	"Sweet Desiree"		3:47
8.	"Suspicion"		3:20
9.	"Check Out"	Whitney, Chapman, Cregan	4:34

- Note: 2 track timings are incorrectly listed on the original LP label. "Boom Bang" is listed as 3:30 and "Check Out" as 4:45. Above timings are correct.

The CD release on Mystic Records also contains the following bonus tracks:
No.	Title	Length
10.	"Hometown"
11.	"Holding the Compass" (live)
12.	"The Weaver's Answer" (live)
13.	"Dim" (live)
14.	"Procession / No Mule's Fool" (live)

== Personnel ==
Family

- Roger Chapman – lead vocals
- John "Charlie" Whitney – guitar, banjo
- Tony Ashton – keyboards, backing vocals
- Jim Cregan – bass
- Rob Townsend – drums, percussion

Additional Personnel

- Peter Hope-Evans – harmonica (2)
- Del Newman – string and horn arrangements

== Charts ==
Chart (1973)	Peak position
UK Albums (Official Charts)	30
