= Anyway (Family album) =

Studio album / Live album by Family
- Released: November 1970
- Recorded: July 26, 1970 live tracks
- Venues: Fairfield Halls, Croydon
- Studios: Olympic Sound Studios, London
- Genres: Progressive rock, hard rock, psychedelic rock
- Length: 40:18
- Labels: Reprise (UK), United Artists (U.S.)
- Producers: Family for Bradgate Bush, Ltd.

Family chronology
A Song for Me (1970)	Anyway (1970)	Old Songs New Songs (1971)

Professional ratings
Review scores
Source	Rating
AllMusic	3/5 stars
Christgau's Record Guide	C+

Anyway is the fourth album by the British progressive rock band Family. Side one was recorded at a concert at Fairfield Halls in Croydon, south London; side two is a collection of new studio recordings.

== Background ==
Anyway is Family's follow-up album to their Top 5 UK charting album, A Song for Me. It peaked at No. 7 on the UK Albums Chart, and remained on the charts for eight weeks.

Production credit for the album was attributed to Family (for their company Bradgate Bush Ltd) and Tony Gourvish (manager) was credited as 'Co-ordination'. Gourvish is credited between live tracks by singer Roger Chapman as 'shining in his new Kings Road suit'.

The album was released on the Reprise label (RSX 9005) as a stereo pressing. Editions are known to have been released in France (gatefold card sleeve, no bag SRV 6120 and later in a stouter card sleeve with a greyer coloured illustration) and Canada and the US (single-pocket card sleeve with "In My Own Time" – a later single, – added as first track on the studio side with the track "Normans" severely edited to make room). The band was moving from US Reprise to US United Artists, and the album was not issued in the US initially. When it did get issued, it initially had the same tracks as the UK album did, but was quickly replaced with "In My Own Time" and "Normans" being edited. The Canadian edition was released on the United Artists label after Family had delivered Bandstand the following album, and had an explanatory sticker on the shrink-wrap.

The UK edition of the album came housed in a plastic see-through sleeve with a gatefold non-pocket inner card design by Hamish and Gustav. The outer illustration was licensed from Biblioteca Ambrosiana, Milan and was titled 'Mortars With Explosive Projectiles' by Leonardo da Vinci. No track listing was printed on the outside of the sleeve.

The track "Normans" was named after a light-hearted band name for people who were deemed idiotic. Radio One disc jockey John Peel rated "Lives And Ladies" as one of the most powerful anti-war songs he had ever heard, and he was known to play the track long after 1970.

== Critical reception ==
Writing for New Musical Express, Nick Logan provided a highly favorable review of Anyway, describing it as a "superb" release that functioned effectively "on all counts." Logan highlighted the album's unique hybrid structure, noting that despite drummer Rob Townsend's caution against comparing the live and studio sides, both halves demonstrated the band's strengths.

The live first side, recorded at Fairfield Halls, was praised for capturing the "schizophrenic excitement" and "screeching feeling" characteristic of Family’s onstage identity. Logan drew comparisons between the instrumental synergy of "Good News-Bad News" and the musicianship of Cream "at their best." He also commended the driving intensity of "Strange Band," emphasizing John Weider’s violin performance and the "relentless fury" of the instrumentation.

While Logan noted that the studio side lacked some of the raw energy of the live performance, he concluded that it compensated with "some of the nicest songs" the band had produced. He lauded Roger Chapman’s vocal performance on "Part of the Load" and identified "Lives and Ladies" as the album's most immediate and illustrative track, praising its controlled instrumental movement and anti-war sentiment. Ultimately, Logan viewed the album as a successful documentation of the band's touring lifestyle and musical evolution.

== Track listing ==
All tracks written by John "Charlie" Whitney and Roger Chapman, except where noted.

Side One: Fairfield Halls, Croydon
No.	Title	Writer(s)	Length
1.	"Good News - Bad News"		7:48
2.	"Willow Tree"		4:48
3.	"Holding the Compass"		4:15
4.	"Strange Band"	Whitney, Chapman, Jim Williamson	4:12

Side Two: Olympic Studios
No.	Title	Writer(s)	Length
1.	"Part of the Load"		4:38
2.	"Anyway"		3:40
3.	"Normans" (instrumental)	Palmer, Whitney, Weider	4:28
4.	"Lives and Ladies"		6:29

- Note: timings on the LP label side 1 (live side) do not include applause and song introductions. The above timings are correct breaks when the applause ends and Roger Chapman's spoken song intro commences.

== Personnel ==
=== Musicians ===
- Roger Chapman – vocals (instrumental vocals on track 7), percussion (track 5)
- Charlie Whitney – electric guitars (tracks 1, 4–8), amplified acoustic guitar (track 3), bass (tracks 2, 6)
- John Weider – bass (tracks 1, 4–5, 7–8), violin (tracks 2, 4, 7), amplified acoustic guitar (track 3), percussion (track 6)
- Poli Palmer – percussion (tracks 3, 6), vibraphone (tracks 1, 4–6), electric piano (track 4), piano (tracks 2, 5, 7–8), flute (track 7), drums (track 5)
- Rob Townsend – drums (tracks 1–2, 4–5, 7–8), percussion (tracks 3, 6)

=== Technical ===
- Family – producer
- George Chkiantz – engineer

== Charts ==
Chart (1970–71)	Peak position
Norwegian Albums (VG-lista)	18
UK Albums (Official Charts)	7
