= A Song for Me =

Studio album by Family
- Released: 23 January 1970
- Recorded: 1969
- Studios: Olympic Studios, London
- Genres: Progressive rock, psychedelic rock, folk rock
- Length: 38:25
- Label: Reprise
- Producer: Family

Family chronology
Family Entertainment (1969)	A Song for Me (1970)	Anyway (1970)

Professional ratings
Review scores
Source	Rating
AllMusic	3/5 stars

A Song for Me is the third album by the British progressive rock band Family, released on 23 January 1970 on Reprise Records.

== Background ==
The album was recorded in late 1969 at Olympic Studios in London. It was their first album with new members John Weider on bass and Poli Palmer on keyboards, flute and vibraphone. The past several months had been full of setbacks for Family. Rick Grech left for Blind Faith, Jim King was forced to leave for getting too deep into drug addiction, and their first U.S. tour proved to be a disaster.

Although many of the songs had been written with King's saxophone in mind, Charlie Whitney and Roger Chapman were able to rework them with Palmer's instruments, and Palmer quickly made himself integral to Family's sound. Because some of these songs had been debuted in live performances in the previous year, many Family fans found themselves getting accommodated to arrangements that sounded radically different from what they expected.

Much of A Song for Me shows Family exploring various popular forms, from jazz and blues to folk and country.

== Track listing ==
All tracks written by John "Charlie" Whitney and Roger Chapman, except where noted.

Side one
No.	Title	Writer(s)	Length
1.	"Drowned in Wine"		4:08
2.	"Some Poor Soul"		2:44
3.	"Love Is a Sleeper"		4:00
4.	"Stop for the Traffic – Through the Heart of Me"		2:09
5.	"Wheels"	Whitney, Chapman, Ric Grech	4:38

Side two
No.	Title	Writer(s)	Length
1.	"Song for Sinking Lovers"		4:04
2.	"Hey – Let It Rock"		1:02
3.	"The Cat and the Rat"		2:30
4.	"93's O.K. J" (instrumental)	Whitney, John Weider	3:57
5.	"A Song for Me"	Whitney, Chapman, Weider, Rob Townsend	9:13

Additional tracks on the February 2007 re-release
No.	Title	Length
1.	"No Mule's Fool"
2.	"Good Friend of Mine"
3.	"Drowned in Wine" (Live)
4.	"Cat and the Rat" (Live)
5.	"Wheels" (Live)
6.	"Song for Me" (Live)

U.S. Vinyl track listing (All CD issues contain the UK track listing)

Side one
No.	Title	Writer(s)	Length
1.	"No Mule's Fool"
2.	"Drowned in Wine"
3.	"Love is a Sleeper"
4.	"Some Poor Soul"
5.	"Wheels"	Whitney, Chapman, Ric Grech

Side two
No.	Title	Writer(s)	Length
1.	"Hey – Let It Rock"
2.	"Stop for the Traffic - Through the Heart of Me"
3.	"Song for Sinking Lovers"
4.	"93's O.K. J" (instrumental)	Whitney, John Weider
5.	"A Song for Me"	Whitney, Chapman, Weider, Rob Townsend

== Personnel ==
=== Family ===
- Roger Chapman – vocals, percussion
- John "Charlie" Whitney – guitars, banjo, organ
- John Weider – guitars, bass, violin, dobro
- John "Poli" Palmer – vibes, piano, flute
- Robert Townsend – drums, percussion, harp

=== Additional musicians ===
- George Bruno – organ (3)

== Technical ==
- Family – producer
- George Chkiantz – engineer
- Dave Bridges – assistant engineer
- Keith Harwood – assistant engineer
- Roger Beale – assistant engineer

== Charts ==
Chart (1970)	Peak position
UK Albums (Official Charts)	4
