= Mail Order Magic =

Studio album by Roger Chapman and the Shortlist
- Released: 1980
- Recorded: Portland, Pebble Beach & Matrix Studios
- Genre: Rock
- Length: 41:26
- Label: Kamera
- Producer: Terry Barham, Paul Smykle

Roger Chapman and the Shortlist chronology
Live in Hamburg (1979)	Mail Order Magic (1980)	Hyenas Only Laugh for Fun (1981)

Professional ratings
Review scores
Source	Rating
AllMusic	4.5/5 stars

Mail Order Magic is the second solo album by singer Roger Chapman and his then band the Shortlist, released in 1980. The production of this album was somewhat troublesome and difficult, but in the end a convincing and powerful album was released.

== Track listing ==
=== Side one ===
No.	Title	Length
1.	"Unknown Soldier"	3:47
2.	"He Was, She Was"	4:48
3.	"Barman"	5:28
4.	"Right to Go"	4:06
5.	"Ducking Down"	3:56

=== Side two ===
No.	Title	Length
6.	"Making the Same Mistake"	4:59
7.	"Another Little Hurt"	3:54
8.	"Mail Order Magic"	4:29
9.	"Higher Ground"	4:16
10.	"Ground Floor"	1:57
Total length:		41:26

== Personnel ==
- Roger Chapman — harmonica, vocals
- Geoff Whitehorn — guitar
- Tim Hinkley — keyboards
- Poli Palmer — synthesizer
- John Wetton — bass
- Jerome Rimson — bass, vocals
- Les Binks — drums
- Mitch Mitchell — drums
- John Halsey — drums
