= Chappo (album) =

Studio album by Roger Chapman
- Released: March 1979
- Studio: Startling (Ascot, Berkshire, England); Marquee (London)
- Genre: Rock
- Length: 47:57
- Label: Arista
- Producer: David Courtney

Roger Chapman chronology
Chappo (1979)	Live in Hamburg (1979)

Professional ratings
Review scores
Source	Rating
AllMusic	3/5 stars
Smash Hits	4/10

Chappo is the debut solo album of singer Roger Chapman, released in 1979.

== Track listing ==
=== Side one ===
No.	Title	Music	Length
1.	"Midnite Child"	Roger Chapman	3:49
2.	"Moth to a Flame"	Roger Chapman	4:57
3.	"Keep Forgettin'"	Leiber & Stoller, Gilbert Garfield	4:21
4.	"Shape of Things"	Roger Chapman, Brian Tench	3:49
5.	"Face of Stone"	Roger Chapman	4:04

=== Side two ===
No.	Title	Music	Length
6.	"Who Pulled the Nite Down"	Roger Chapman	3:48
7.	"Always Gotta Pay in the End"	Jeremy Baines, Roger Chapman	4:25
8.	"Hang on to a Dream"	Tim Hardin	3:35
9.	"Pills"	Roger Chapman, Charlie Whitney	4:29
10.	"Don't Give Up"	Roger Chapman	7:03
Total length:			47:57

== Personnel ==
Musicians

- Roger Chapman – Harmonica, Vocals
- Dave Markee – Bass
- Brian Odgers – Bass
- Billy Livsey – Keyboards
- Geoff Whitehorn – Guitar
- Micky Moody – Guitar
- Henry Spinetti – Drums
- Simon Morton – Percussion
- Ray Cooper – Percussion
- Ron Aspery – Saxophone
- Poli Palmer – Synthesizer
- Peter Hope-Evans – Harmonica
- Joy Yates – Backing Vocals
- Vicki Brown – Backing Vocals
- Jimmy Chambers – Backing Vocals
- George Chandler – Backing Vocals

Additional personnel

- David Courtney – producer
- David Tickle, Steve Churchyard – engineer
- Cameron McVey – photography

== Releases ==
- CD Chappo Polydor 1990
- CD Chappo Essential Records / Castle Music Ltd. 1999
