= Markthalle Hamburg =

Concert hall and convention center in Hamburg, Germany

Coordinates: 53°32′56″N 10°00′21″E

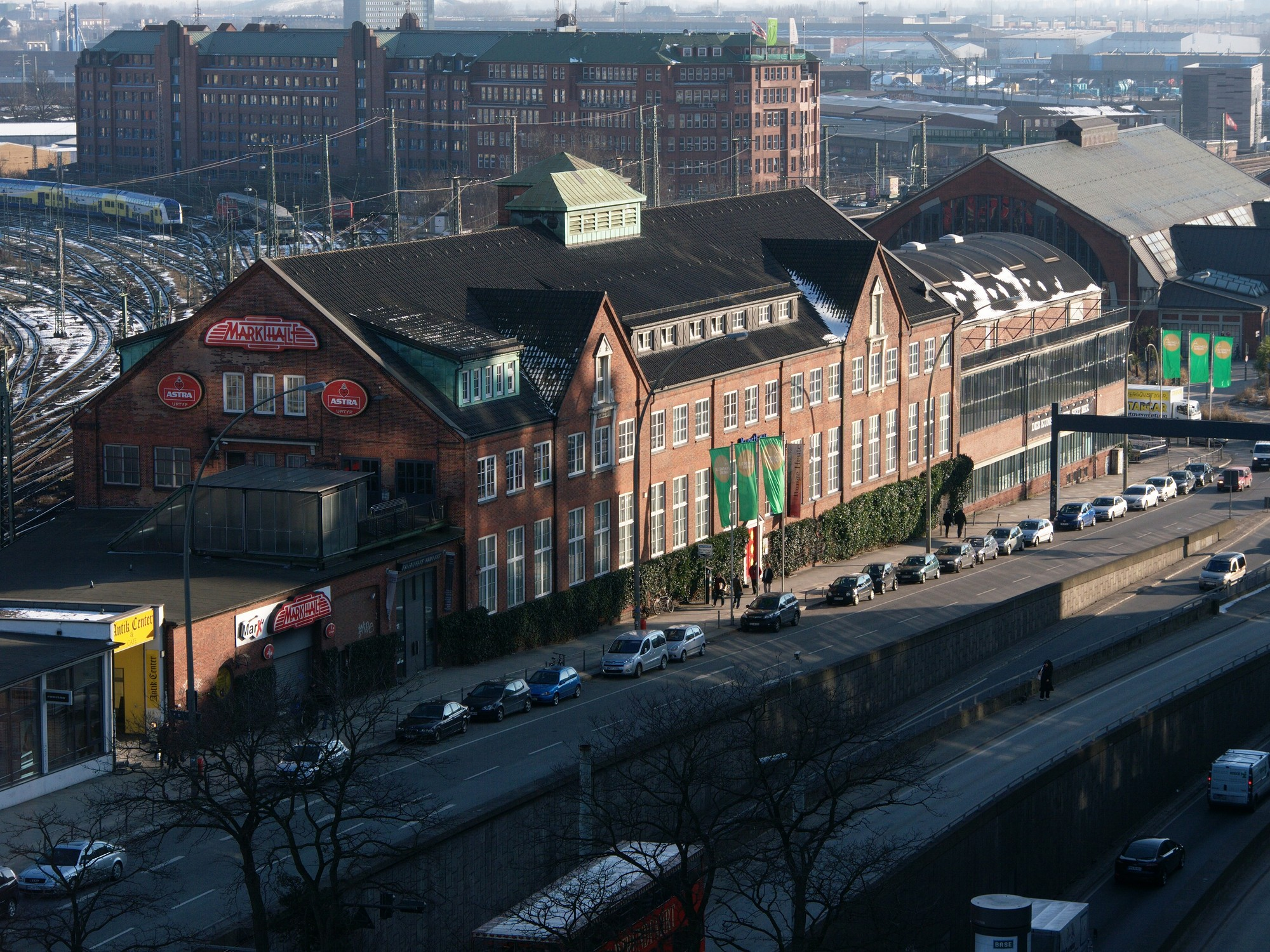
Markthalle Hamburg

Markthalle Hamburg is a convention center located at Klosterwall in the Hammerbrook quarter of Hamburg, Germany. It was designed by the architect Fritz Schumacher and built in 1913.

The main hall can hold up to 1,000 people. Many notable artists have performed in the main hall including AC/DC, Iggy Pop, Toy Dolls, Ramones, Motörhead, Iron Maiden, Judas Priest, The Police, INXS, The Smiths, The Clash, The Cure, Depeche Mode, Nirvana, Soundgarden, Pearl Jam, Guns N' Roses and Beastie Boys.

On May 18, 1978 American poet Charles Bukowski, did his only performance in Europe in Markthalle.

Four live albums have been recorded at the venue:

- Live in Hamburg by Roger Chapman (1979)
- The Hamburg Tapes by Gotthard (1996)
- No Holds Barred by Biohazard (1997)
- Slip Stitch and Pass by Phish (1997)
