= Mango Crazy =

Studio album by Roger Chapman and the Shortlist
- Released: 1983
- Studio: The Point (London)
- Genre: Rock
- Label: RCA, Instant
- Producer: Geoff Whitehorn, Roger Chapman

Roger Chapman and the Shortlist chronology
Swag (1983)	Mango Crazy (1983)	The Shadow Knows (1984)

Mango Crazy is the fourth studio album by singer Roger Chapman and his band the Shortlist. The album was released in 1983.

== Track listing ==
All songs have been composed by Roger Chapman.

=== Side one ===
1. "Mango Crazy" – 4:19
2. "Toys: Do You?" – 4:06
3. "I Read Your File" – 4:00
4. "Los Dos Bailadores" – 3:44
5. "Blues Breaker" – 4:14
6. "Turn It Up" – 4:05

=== Side two ===
1. "Let Me Down" – 3:21
2. "Hunt The Man" – 6:03
3. "Rivers Run Dry" – 4:07
4. "I Really Can't Go Straight" – 4:14
5. "Room Service" – 2:56
6. "Hegoshegowegoamigo" – 0:56

== Personnel ==
- Roger Chapman – vocals
- J. Lawrence Cook – keyboards
- Duncan Mackay – keyboards
- Ronnie Leahy – keyboards
- Geoff Whitehorn – guitars
- Steve Simpson – violin, mandolin, guitar, vocals
- Boz Burrell – bass guitar
- Alan Coulter – drums
- Nick Pentelow – saxophone
