= Kiss My Soul =

Studio album by Roger Chapman and the Shortlist
- Released: 1996
- Genre: Rock
- Length: 53:03
- Label: Essential
- Producer: Dieter Falk

Roger Chapman and the Shortlist chronology
Under No Obligation (1992)	Kiss My Soul (1996)	A Turn Unstoned? (1998)

Kiss My Soul is a 1996 album by Roger Chapman, the former lead singer of the 1970s British progressive rock band Family.

== Track listing ==
No.	Title	Music	Length
1.	"Into the Bright"	Chapman/Wetton/Marlette	4:03
2.	"Habits of a Lifetime"	Chapman/Wisefield	4:26
3.	"A Kat Kalled Kokomo"	Chapman/Simpson	4:03
4.	"One More Whisky"	Chapman/Moody	4:17
5.	"Kiss My Soul"	Chapman/Simpson	4:06
6.	"Outside Looking In"	Chapman	4:40
7.	"Beautiful Dreamers"	Chapman/Cregan	6:06
8.	"It's All Over Now, Baby Blue"	Dylan	4:34
9.	"Mistreated"	Ballard	3:52
10.	"Song of Desire"	Chapman/Simpson	4:32
11.	"Two Pieces of Silver"	Chapman/Moody	4:29
12.	"Really Started Something"	Chapman	3:55
Total length:			53:03

== Personnel ==
- Roger Chapman — harmonica, Vocals
- Joe Chemay — bass guitar
- Geoff Dugmore — drums
- Steve Simpson — guitar
- Jay Stapley — guitar
- Carol Thompson — background vocals
- Juliet Roberts — background vocals
