= Welcome to the Canteen =

Live album by Traffic
- Released: 10 September 1971
- Recorded: Fairfield Halls, Croydon, 6 June 1971; The Oz Benefit Concert, London, July 1971
- Genre: Rock
- Length: 39:21
- Label: United Artists/Island

Traffic chronology
John Barleycorn Must Die (1970)	Welcome to the Canteen (1971)	The Low Spark of High Heeled Boys (1971)

Welcome to the Canteen is the first live album by English rock band Traffic. It was recorded live at Fairfield Halls, Croydon and the Oz Benefit Concert in the canteen of the Polytechnic of Central London London, on 3 July 1971 and released in September of that year. It was recorded during Dave Mason's third stint with the band, which lasted only six performances.

The track list includes one song each from the first three Traffic albums; two songs from Mason's first solo album, Alone Together; and "Gimme Some Lovin'" from Steve Winwood's former band, the Spencer Davis Group. Winwood's organ and Mason's rhythm guitar are conspicuously out of sync for part of "Gimme Some Lovin'".

In the United Kingdom, the album was a surprise flop, the first in a series of albums by the group that would fail to make an appearance in the charts. In the US, however, it was a success, hitting number 26 in the charts and yielding the single "Gimme Some Lovin' (live)", which reached number 68 in the Billboard Hot 100.

Although regarded as a Traffic album, it was originally released without the name "Traffic" anywhere on it; credited instead to the seven individual musicians. Nonetheless, the Traffic logo appeared on the cover (on the back, in this case) as on all of their albums. Most later issues retain the original front cover with its individual crediting, but credit the album to Traffic on the spine.

== Background ==
In 1970, Traffic toured in support of their comeback album John Barleycorn Must Die, with a quartet line-up of Steve Winwood, Chris Wood, Jim Capaldi, and Ric Grech. In November, the group played a series of concerts at the Fillmore East, and recordings from these concerts were compiled into a live album, to be called Live Traffic, consisting of "Who Knows What Tomorrow May Bring", "Glad", "Pearly Queen", "40,000 Headmen", "Dear Mr. Fantasy", and "Can't Find My Way Home". This album was set for release in early 1971, but cancelled for unknown reasons, though Side A eventually appeared as bonus tracks on the 1999 reissue of John Barleycorn Must Die.

By the time of their next tour, Traffic had expanded with the additions of Dave Mason, Jim Gordon, and Reebop Kwaku Baah. The band only performed six dates, two of which – their opening performance at Fairfield Hall, Croydon and a London benefit for Oz – were recorded and mixed to become Welcome to the Canteen. Mason was keen to take this version of Traffic to the United States, but Winwood was only interested in doing the six dates. Mason said, "It's Stevie's band, so it's up to him."

Welcome to the Canteen was the last album Traffic released under the band's North American distribution contract with United Artists Records. Their next album, The Low Spark of High Heeled Boys, was issued by Island Records, who released Traffic's records in the U.K. and who (in late 1971) had recently established operations in North America.

== Release and reception ==
Retrospective professional reviews
Review scores
Source	Rating
AllMusic	4/5 stars
Christgau's Record Guide	B−
The Great Rock Discography	5/10
The Rolling Stone Record Guide	3/5 stars

Welcome to the Canteen was released in September 1971. Reviewing for Rolling Stone in October, Ed Leimbacher regarded most of the songs as "near duplicates" of their original studio versions, but found the performances of the musicians redeeming. He was particularly impressed by "Dear Mr. Fantasy" (calling it "eleven swirling, blending, building, wondrous minutes of 'Fantasy' with Winwood as pensive/yearning/mournful as ever") and "Gimme Some Lovin'" (calling it "a nine-minute eternal experience" rendered from the "all time great three minute single"). The album was included in The Villanovan critic Fred Trietsch's ballot in the first annual Pazz & Jop critics poll of the year's top albums, published by The Village Voice in February 1972. Robert Christgau, the poll's creator and supervisor, was indifferent in his appraisal, published later in Christgau's Record Guide: Rock Albums of the Seventies (1981). He found the album "lax at times, but not bad for live jazziness—Stevie Winwood and Dave Mason play as engagingly as Mike Ratledge and Elton Dean, say, and in a genuine rock style." He appreciated how much "more aggressive" it sounded compared to the band's studio recordings, adding that "the double percussion of Jim Gordon and Rebop Kwaku Baah driving pretty hard at times. Even the lackadaisical 'Gimme Some Lovin' doesn't seem like a desecration." Martin C. Strong was more critical, writing in The Great Rock Discography (1998) that the album is "fairly heavy going but no less self-indulgent than your average early 70's live effort".

The album was reissued on CD by Island Records, on 19 March 2002, in the United States, and on 22 April 2002, in the United Kingdom. Reviewing the rerelease for PopMatters, Ronnie D. Lankford Jr. was somewhat disappointed by the relatively inessential, two-track second half and the lack of bonus tracks typically found on reissues, but felt the first-half "exceeds expectations" and the album ultimately "offers a close facsimile of what the original Traffic sounded like live, and that's reason enough to add it to your collection." AllMusic's William Ruhlmann expressed even more enthusiasm about the release, saying it serves as an overview of "the Winwood/Mason/Traffic musical world" and shows "how good a contractual obligation album could be ... the playing was exemplary, and the set list was an excellent mixture of old Traffic songs and recent Mason favorites."

== Track listing ==
Side one
No.	Title	Writer(s)	Length
1.	"Medicated Goo"	Jimmy Miller, Steve Winwood	3:34
2.	"Sad and Deep as You"	Dave Mason	3:48
3.	"Forty Thousand Headmen"	Winwood, Jim Capaldi	6:21
4.	"Shouldn't Have Took More Than You Gave"	Mason	5:39
Total length:			19:22

Side two
No.	Title	Writer(s)	Length
5.	"Dear Mr. Fantasy"	Capaldi, Winwood, Chris Wood	10:57
6.	"Gimme Some Lovin'"	Winwood, Muff Winwood, Spencer Davis	9:02
Total length:			19:59 (39:21)

== Personnel ==
- Steve Winwood – lead vocals (1, 3, 5, 6), organ, electric piano, acoustic guitar (3), electric guitar (5)
- Jim Capaldi – vocals, tambourine, percussion
- Dave Mason – lead vocals (2, 4), electric guitar (1, 4, 5, 6), acoustic guitar (2)
- Chris Wood – saxophone, flute, electric piano, organ
- Ric Grech – electric bass
- Jim Gordon – drums
- Rebop Kwaku Baah – congas, timbales, bongos

== Charts ==
Chart (1971–72)	Peak position
Australian Albums (Kent Music Report)	49
Canada Top Albums/CDs (RPM)	23
Italian Albums (Musica e Dischi)	20
US Billboard 200	26
