= Hyenas Only Laugh for Fun =

Studio album by Roger Chapman and the Shortlist
- Released: December 1981
- Studios: Jacobs (Farnham, Surrey)
- Genre: Rock
- Label: Sanctuary
- Producers: Terry Barham and Paul Smykle

Roger Chapman and the Shortlist chronology
Mail Order Magic (1980)	Hyenas Only Laugh for Fun (1981)	The Riffburglar Album (1982)

Hyenas Only Laugh for Fun is the third solo album by singer Roger Chapman and his band the Shortlist. The album was released 1981.

== Track listing ==
All lyrics by Roger Chapman

=== Side one ===
1. "Prisoner" (Chapman, Tim Hinkley, Geoff Whitehorn) – 5:38
2. "Hyenas Only Laugh for Fun" (Chapman, Hinkley, Whitehorn, Jerome Rimson) – 3:10
3. "Killing Time" (Chapman) – 5:35
4. "Wants Nothing Chained" (Chapman, Whitehorn)– 3:00
5. "The Long Goodbye" (Chapman) – 4:39

=== Side two ===
1. "Blood and Sand" (Chapman, Whitehorn) – 4:55
2. "Common Touch" (Chapman) – 5:10
3. "Goodbye Reprise" (Chapman) – 1:10
4. "Hearts On The Floor" (Chapman) – 4:30
5. "Step Up – Take A Bow" (Chapman, Whitney) – 3:30
6. "Jukebox Mama" (Chapman, Troy Seals) – 1:22

== Personnel ==
- Roger Chapman – Harmonica, vocals
- Tim Hinkley – Keyboards
- Geoff Whitehorn – Guitars
- Steve Simpson – Violin, mandolin, slide guitar
- Jerome Rimson – Bass guitar
- John Wetton – Bass guitar
- Leonard "Stretch" Stretching – Drums
- Alan Coulter – Drums
- Nick Pentelow – Saxophones
- Poli Palmer – Synthesisers, programming
- Raymond Burrell – Editing blocks
- Duncan Kinnell – Percussion
- Jill Mumford - sleeve design
