= The Weaver's Answer =

Song by Family

from the album Family Entertainment
- Released: March 1969
- Recorded: 1968–1969
- Genre: Progressive rock, hard rock
- Length: 5:00
- Label: Reprise
- Songwriters: Roger Chapman, John "Charlie" Whitney
- Producers: Glyn Johns, John Gilbert

"The Weaver's Answer" is a song by the British progressive rock band Family. It is the first track on their 1969 album Family Entertainment and became the band's signature song in concert.

== History ==
"The Weaver's Answer" was composed by the two leaders of Family, guitarist Charlie Whitney and lead vocalist Roger Chapman. It was performed live frequently before being properly recorded in the studio. Family also performed "The Weaver's Answer" for BBC Radio 1 in July 1968, broadcast that September. A studio version was recorded for the album Family Entertainment, issued the following February.

Once it was widely available, "The Weaver's Answer" became Family's signature song, becoming their most popular stage number. When the band performed their final concert on 13 October 1973, "The Weaver's Answer" was the last song in the set.

== Lyrics ==
"The Weaver's Answer" is one of Family's more straightforward songs; it's about an old man asking for the "weaver of life" to show him "the patterns of my life gone by upon your tapestry". As the song gets underway, the old man recounts his childhood, his first love, and the day he took a wife; he wonders aloud how it looks on the fabric from the weaver's loom. He goes on to ruminate about his sons and how they grew into adulthood to take wives of their own.

After an instrumental break (see below), the old man grows more sorrowful, remembering the day his wife died and being unable to see his grandchildren after age has robbed him of his sight. Suddenly, he regains his sight to see the weaver's loom drawing closer. Realizing that he's about to see his life as a tapestry, the old man understands the reason why - because he's about to die.

Commenting on the meaning in his own web guestbook, Roger Chapman said "The 'Weaver' in question comes from mythology, folklore and a bit of acid! Include any Marvel hero, Aesop's Fables, anything simply written with a moral and a story I could understand and make sense of. All the stuff I was interested in as a kid, read about and later included in my story telling."

== Live performances ==
Whitney and Chapman were unsatisfied with the studio arrangement of "The Weaver's Answer". When bassist/violinist John Weider and multi-instrumentalist John "Poli" Palmer respectively replaced Grech and King, Family re-arrangedThe Weaver's Answer as a loud, violent song in concert. Palmer offered a flute solo in the instrumental break that replaced King's saxophone, and Whitney's guitar became more vicious. The most notable differences were Chapman's voice, as he punctuated his delivery with bloodcurdling screams, while Townsend's drum patterns became more devastating. A live performance from 1970 was used in the documentary Message to Love. Subsequent personnel changes after 1971 forced Family to alter this arrangement slightly - Weider's departure that June precluded them from employing the violin that had become integral to the song - but "The Weaver's Answer" never lost its popularity with Family fans.

In June 2006 Roger Chapman performed the song with a new orchestral arrangement. It was specially written by the German composer and arranger Ingo Laufs for the open-air concert Bridges to Classic at Haendel-Festival in Halle/Germany.
