= One More Time for Peace =

Studio album by Roger Chapman
- Released: 16 April 2007
- Studio: Liscombe Park, Leighton Buzzard, England; Bucks & C.M.S., Esher, Surrey, England
- Genre: Rock
- Label: Mystic

Roger Chapman chronology
Chappo-The Loft Tapes, Volume 4 (2006)	One More Time for Peace (2007)	Hide Go Seek (2009)

One More Time for Peace is a studio album by the British singer Roger Chapman. The album was released in April 2007.

== Track listing ==
1. "One More Time for Peace!" (Roger Chapman) – 4:05
2. "Heading Back to Storyville" (Chapman) – 6:22
3. "All Too Soon" (Chapman) – 5:07
4. "Oh Brother, Take Me!" (Chapman, Steve Simpson) – 6:00
5. "Hell of a Lullaby" (Chapman) – 4:59
6. "All Night Paradise" (Chapman) – 3:35
7. "Naked Hearts" (Chapman, Jim Cregan) – 3:47
8. "Sweet Bird" (Chapman) – 3:48
9. "Devil Got a Son" (Chapman) – 4:38
10. "The Same Old Loving Feeling" (Chapman, Simpson) – 4:14
11. "Jerusalem" (Trad. arranged by Chapman & Cregan) – 3:14

== Personnel ==
- Roger Chapman – vocals
- Jim Cregan – producer, electric and acoustic guitars, background vocals, programming
- Steve Simpson – electric, slide & acoustic guitars, mandolin, fiddle, background vocals
- Micky Moody – electric, slide, acoustic & dobro guitars
- Ian Gibbons – organ
- Henry Spinetti – drums
- Tim Harries – bass
- Max Middleton – piano
- Sonny Spider – harmonica and background vocals
- Roger Cotton – organ at "One More Time for Peace!"
- Bobby Tench – backing vocals
