= Music in a Doll's House =

Studio album by Family
- Released: 19 July 1968
- Recorded: December 1967 – early 1968
- Studios: Olympic Studios, London
- Genres: Progressive rock; psychedelia
- Length: 37:00
- Label: Reprise
- Producer: Dave Mason

Family chronology
Music in a Doll's House (1968)	Family Entertainment (1969)

Professional ratings
Review scores
Source	Rating
AllMusic	4/5 stars
Rolling Stone	(neutral)
Encyclopedia of Popular Music	5/5 stars

Music in a Doll's House is the debut album by English progressive rock group Family, released on 19 July 1968. The album, co-produced by Dave Mason of Traffic, features a number of complex musical arrangements contributing to its ambitious psychedelic sound.

== Background ==
The Beatles had originally intended to use the title A Doll's House for the double album they were recording during 1968. The release of Family's similarly titled debut prompted them to adopt the minimalist title The Beatles for what is now commonly referred to as the "White Album" due to its plain white sleeve.

"Old Songs, New Songs" features a cameo from the Tubby Hayes group, arranged by 18-year-old Mike Batt. Hayes played the tenor sax solo at the end of the track (uncredited). Batt also arranged and conducted other strings and brass for the album, notably "The Chase" and "Mellowing Grey" but was not credited.

The album was the first by an English rock group to be released on the US Reprise label (which had originally been set up by Frank Sinatra but was now owned by Warner Bros). It was licensed to the label by Dukeslodge Enterprises, a company run by the band's manager, John Gilbert, who was credited as 'executive producer' of the album. The album was released on vinyl in mono (RLP6312), stereo (RSLP6312) and on Stereo 8 Track Cartridge. In an interview for ZigZag magazine, Whitney reported that due to only having four track recording equipment final overdubs were done live during the mix so mono vinyl copies had a different mix than the stereo version; due to a pressing error, the record would jump the grooves during playback so the mono release was withdrawn.

This album was initially issued in the US using the UK import and sold in the US as a domestic album with an extra piece of cardboard to stiffen the sleeve (as they essentially had the same catalog number in both countries). Around the time the second album was issued in the US, US pressings of this album started to appear. (The album also initially had a 12" black and white photo of the group included as an insert.)

== Reception ==
In the Q & Mojo Classic Special Edition Pink Floyd & The Story of Prog Rock, the album ranked number 30 in its list of "40 Cosmic Rock Albums". It was voted number 606 in the third edition of Colin Larkin's All Time Top 1000 Albums (2000).

== Track listing ==
All tracks written by John Whitney and Roger Chapman, except as noted.

Side A
No.	Title	Writer(s)	Length
1.	"The Chase"		2:13
2.	"Mellowing Grey"		2:48
3.	"Never Like This"	Dave Mason	2:18
4.	"Me My Friend"		2:01
5.	"Variation on a Theme of Hey Mr. Policeman" (instrumental)		0:23
6.	"Winter"		2:26
7.	"Old Songs, New Songs"		4:17
8.	"Variation on a Theme of The Breeze" (instrumental)		0:40
Total length:			17:14

Side B
No.	Title	Writer(s)	Length
9.	"Hey Mr. Policeman"	Whitney, Ric Grech, Chapman	3:13
10.	"See Through Windows"		3:43
11.	"Variation on a Theme of Me My Friend" (instrumental)	Whitney	0:22
12.	"Peace of Mind"		2:22
13.	"Voyage"		3:35
14.	"The Breeze"		2:50
15.	"3 x Time"		3:34
16.	"God Save the Queen" (hidden track)		0:14
Total length:			19:57

== Personnel ==
=== Family ===
- Roger Chapman – vocals, harmonica, tenor saxophone
- John "Charlie" Whitney – lead and steel guitars
- Jim King – tenor and soprano saxophones, vocals, harmonica
- Ric Grech – bass guitar, vocals, violin, cello
- Rob Townsend – drums, percussion

=== Technical ===
- Dave Mason – producer, Mellotron
- Jimmy Miller – co-producer on "The Breeze" and "Peace of Mind"
- John Gilbert – executive producer
- Eddie Kramer – engineer
- George Chkiantz – second engineer
- Peter Duval – album design
- Julian Cottrell – front cover photography
- Jac Remise – back cover photography

== Charts ==
Chart (1968)	Peak position
UK Albums (Official Charts)	35
