= Live in Hamburg (Roger Chapman album) =

Live album by Roger Chapman and the Shortlist
- Released: December 1979
- Recorded: August 28, 1979
- Venue: Markthalle Hamburg, Germany
- Genre: Rock
- Length: 49:11
- Label: Acrobat

Roger Chapman and the Shortlist chronology
Chappo (1979)	Live in Hamburg (1979)	Mail Order Magic (1980)

Professional ratings
Review scores
Source	Rating
AllMusic	4.5/5 stars

Live in Hamburg is a live album by singer Roger Chapman and his then band the Shortlist, released in 1979. It was recorded on August 28, 1979, at the Markthalle Hamburg, Germany.

== Track listing ==
All tracks composed by Roger Chapman; except where indicated

=== Side one ===
No.	Title	Writer(s)	Length
1.	"Moth to a Flame"		5:49
2.	"Keep Forgettin'"	Jerry Leiber, Mike Stoller	5:01
3.	"Midnite Child"		5:25
4.	"Who Pulled The Night Down"		5:55
5.	"Talking About You"	Chuck Berry	2:37

=== Side two ===
No.	Title	Writer(s)	Length
6.	"Shortlist"	Mickey Jupp	6:45
7.	"Can't Get In"	Chapman, Bobby Tench	6:41
8.	"Keep A Knockin'"		1:06
9.	"I'm Your Hoochie Coochie Man"	Willie Dixon	3:57
10.	"Let's Spend The Night Together"	Mick Jagger, Keith Richards	5:59
Total length:			49:11

The 2005 CD reissue includes the bonus track "Hey Mr Policeman".

== Personnel ==
- Roger Chapman – vocals
- Geoff Whitehorn – guitar
- Tim Hinkley – keyboards
- Jerome Rimson – bass, vocals
- Mel Collins – saxophone
- Leonard "Stretch" Stretching – drums
- Helen Hardy & Kathy O'Donaghue – backing vocals
