= Ric Grech =

British musician (1946–1990)

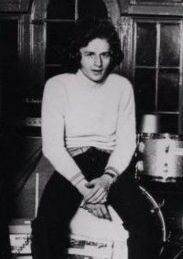
- Grech in 1969

Background information
- Born: Richard Roman Grechko; 1 November 1946; Bordeaux, France
- Died: 17 March 1990 (aged 43) Leicester, England
- Genres: Rock; jazz fusion; progressive rock
- Instruments: Bass guitar; violin
- Years active: 1965–1977
- Formerly of: Family; Blind Faith; Ginger Baker's Air Force; Traffic; KGB; The Crickets

Richard Roman Grechko (1 November 1946 – 17 March 1990), better known as Ric Grech, was a British rock musician. He is best known for playing bass guitar and violin with the rock band Family as well as in the supergroup Blind Faith and later Traffic. He also played with ex-Cream drummer Ginger Baker.

== Education ==
He was born in Bordeaux, France. He was educated at Corpus Christi RC School, Leicester, after attending Sacred Heart Primary School. He played violin in the school orchestra.

== Career ==
Grech originally gained notice in the United Kingdom as the bass guitar player for the progressive rock group Family. He joined the band when it was a largely blues-based live act in Leicester known as the Farinas. He became their bassist in 1965, replacing Tim Kirchin. Family released their first single, "Scene Through The Eye of a Lens," in September 1967 on the Liberty label in the UK, which got the band signed to Reprise Records. The group's 1968 debut album, Music in a Doll's House, was an underground hit that highlighted the songwriting talents of Roger Chapman and John "Charlie" Whitney as well as Chapman's unique vocal delivery, but Grech also stood out with his rhythmic, thundering bass work on songs such as "Old Songs New Songs" and "See Through Windows," along with his aptitude on cello and violin.

Released in March 1969, the group's second album, Family Entertainment was a major turning point for Grech personally. In addition to playing bass and violin, he wrote three of the album's songs: "How-Hi-The-Li", "Face In the Cloud" and "Second Generation Woman", which was first released as a single in Britain in November 1968. This song featured Grech on lead vocals, leading Family through a cheeky lyric about a woman who "looks good to handle from a personal angle," with an arrangement that recalled the Beatles' "Paperback Writer" and owed an obvious debt to Chuck Berry.

In early 1969, former Cream guitarist Eric Clapton and former Traffic frontman Steve Winwood formed the supergroup Blind Faith; in need of a bassist, they immediately recruited Grech, with whom they had both jammed when Clapton was in John Mayall's Bluesbreakers and Winwood was in the Spencer Davis Group. However, Grech failed to tell Chapman and Whitney before Family left in April for a US tour with The Nice and Ten Years After. "He and [manager John] Gilbert obviously knew before we got to America", said Chapman later. "They didn't tell us until the day before we opened at the Fillmore East, where we died." Reportedly, Grech was so intoxicated he could barely play and was shipped back home, to be replaced by John Weider.

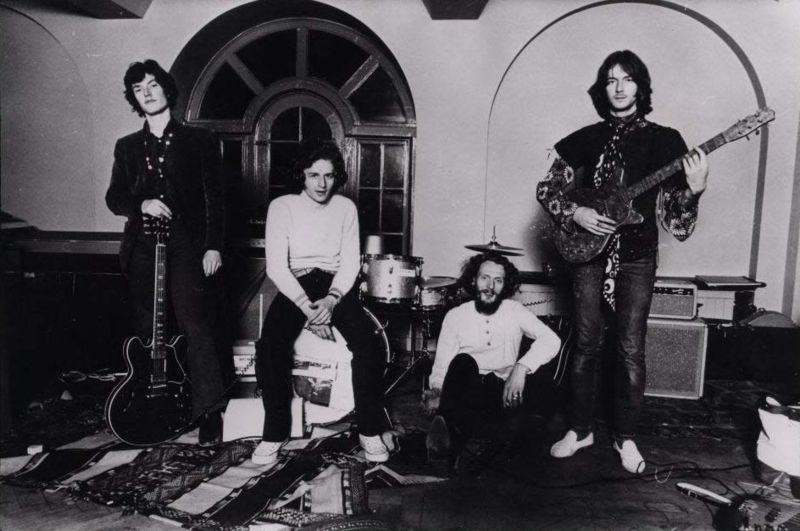
Grech (second from left) with Blind Faith in 1969

Returning to England, Grech recorded Blind Faith's eponymous album with Clapton, Winwood and drummer Ginger Baker, a former Clapton bandmate in Cream. The quartet toured the US to support it but Clapton was disappointed with the quality of the music and performances, so the group disbanded. Grech and Winwood stayed with Baker to form Ginger Baker's Air Force, a supergroup that also included Denny Laine (ex-Moody Blues and future-Paul McCartney and Wings) on guitar, Chris Wood (ex-Traffic) on saxophone and flute, and several other musicians. Also, after Blind Faith ended, Winwood reformed Traffic with original members Wood and Jim Capaldi; and, following the recording of John Barleycorn Must Die, Grech joined as their bassist.

In October 1969, between Blind Faith and Traffic, Grech recorded two tracks for an unfinished solo project, "Spending All My Days" and "Exchange And Mart". Among the participants in the session was George Harrison. In 1970, Grech appeared on Graham Bond's album Holy Magick.

As in Family, Grech lasted two albums with Traffic — the live Welcome to the Canteen and the well-received The Low Spark of High Heeled Boys. Along with drummer Jim Gordon, Grech co-wrote the minor hit "Rock N Roll Stew." Drugs, however, remained a problem, and Winwood and his bandmates eventually decided they had no alternative but to dismiss him.

Grech remained active in session work, playing with Rod Stewart, Ronnie Lane, Vivian Stanshall and Muddy Waters. He also worked with Rosetta Hightower, the Crickets, Bee Gees and Gram Parsons. In January 1973, he performed in Eric Clapton's Rainbow Concert, and he reunited with Roger Chapman and Charlie Whitney when the duo recorded an album in 1974 after Family's breakup. Grech was one of many special guests on that record, which led Chapman and Whitney to form the group Streetwalkers. Grech, however, was not in that band.

Grech made at least two reported attempts to start a new rock group in the 1970s but both failed. During 1973–74, he played in one of numerous versions of the late Buddy Holly backing band The Crickets.

In 1973, RSO Records released the only album under his own name, credited to "Rick" Grech. The album was titled The Last Five Years. It contained songs that Grech wrote and recorded with Family, Gram Parsons, Blind Faith, Traffic, and Ginger Baker's Airforce between 1968 and 1973. One track, "Just a Guest", was written by Grech and sung by Rosetta Hightower. It is apparently exclusive to this album.

In 1974, Grech joined KGB. Consisting of Grech on bass, Mike Bloomfield (ex-Paul Butterfield Blues Band and Electric Flag) on guitar, Carmine Appice (ex-Vanilla Fudge, Cactus and Beck, Bogert & Appice) on drums, Barry Goldberg on keyboards, and Ray Kennedy (co-writer of "Sail On, Sailor") on vocals, the group released its eponymous (KGB, for Kennedy Grech Bloomfield) debut album that year. Grech and Bloomfield immediately quit after its release, stating they never had faith in the project. The album was not critically well received.

In 1976 he formed Ric Grech's SDM (Square Dance Machine) to perform country music in a Gram Parsons style, but proved unsuccessful as punk rock grew in popularity.

Grech retired from music in 1977.

== Death ==
Grech died on 17 March 1990, aged 43, of liver failure as a result of alcoholism.

== Discography ==
=== as band member ===
with Family:

- Music in a Doll's House (Reprise, 1968)
- Family Entertainment (Reprise, 1969)
- A Song For Me (Reprise, 1970)
- Old Songs New Songs (compilation, Reprise, 1971)

with Blind Faith:

- Blind Faith (Polydor (UK), Atco (US), 1969)

with Ginger Baker's Air Force:

- Ginger Baker's Air Force (Polydor (UK), Atco (US), 1970)
- Ginger Baker's Air Force 2 (Polydor (UK), Atco (US), 1970)

with Traffic:

- The Low Spark of High Heeled Boys (Island, 1971)
- Welcome to the Canteen (United Artists, 1971) (Recorded live in London)

with KGB:

- KGB (MCA, 1975)
- MOTION (MCA, 1976)

=== as session artist ===
with Gram Parsons:

- GP (Reprise, 1973)

with Muddy Waters:

- The London Muddy Waters Sessions (Chess, 1972)

with Eric Clapton:

- Eric Clapton's Rainbow Concert (Polydor, 1973) (Recorded live in London)

with Eddie Harris:

- E.H. in the U.K. (one track) (Atlantic, 1973)
