= Family Entertainment =

Studio album by Family
- Released: March 1969
- Recorded: 1968–1969
- Studios: Olympic Studios, London
- Genres: Progressive rock, art rock, folk rock
- Length: 39:38
- Label: Reprise
- Producers: Glyn Johns, John Gilbert

Family chronology
Music in a Doll's House (1968)	Family Entertainment (1969)	A Song for Me (1970)

Professional ratings
Review scores
Source	Rating
Allmusic	4/5 stars
Encyclopedia of Popular Music	4/5 stars

Family Entertainment is the second album by the British progressive rock band Family, released in March 1969. The cover of the album was a takeoff from the sleeve of the Doors' second album, Strange Days, as Family admitted.

== Background ==
The album was released on Reprise Records (RSLP6340) in stereo pressings, no mono pressings are known, in the USA, England and Germany. Initial UK pressings came with a black and white poster/lyric sheet inside. The original inner bags were the gold-on-white 'Egyptian' poly-lined Reprise house bags. The band were on tour in America and their manager hastily mixed and released the album without their approval. This proved to be the end of their relationship with manager John Gilbert (who retained the rights to the album via his Dukeslodge production deal which, by now, was registered in the Bahamas, the address of which was proudly printed on the album sleeve).

String arrangements were by Tony Cox, played by the Heavenly Strings, and Nicky Hopkins played the piano on some tracks. Alan Aldridge was the album designer with photos taken by Rodger Phillips.

Family Entertainment was the last album from the group's original lineup.

Family's momentum was almost derailed by the departure of bassist Ric Grech for Blind Faith two months after Family Entertainment's UK release, which caused their first US tour to founder, and Jim King only worsened the situation with his departure later in 1969.

== Track listing ==
All selections are by Roger Chapman and John "Charlie" Whitney except where noted.

Side one
No.	Title	Writer(s)	Length
1.	"The Weaver's Answer"		5:00
2.	"Observations from a Hill"		3:11
3.	"Hung Up Down"		3:12
4.	"Summer '67" (instrumental)	Whitney	3:19
5.	"How-Hi-the-Li"	Ric Grech	5:00

Side two
No.	Title	Writer(s)	Length
1.	"Second Generation Woman"	Grech	3:13
2.	"From Past Archives"		3:21
3.	"Dim"		2:31
4.	"Processions"	Whitney	2:48
5.	"Face in the Cloud"	Grech	2:53
6.	"Emotions"	Whitney, Grech, Chapman	5:10

== Personnel ==
=== Family ===
- Roger Chapman – lead (1, 3, 5, 7–9, 11) and backing vocals, percussion
- John "Charlie" Whitney – guitars, organ, piano
- Jim King – saxophone, backing and lead (2) vocals, piano
- Ric Grech – bass, backing and lead (6, 10) vocals, violin
- Rob Townsend – drums, percussion
- sitar on track 10 probably played by Dave Mason

=== Additional personnel ===
- Nicky Hopkins – piano

=== Technical ===
- Glyn Johns – producer, engineer
- John Gilbert – producer

== Charts ==
Chart (1969)	Peak position
UK Albums (Official Charts)	6
