= Streetwalkers =

English rock band (1974–1977)

Background information
- Origin: England
- Genres: Blues rock; hard rock
- Years active: 1974–1977
- Labels: Mercury; Reprise; Vertigo; BGO; Swan Song

Streetwalkers were an English rock band formed in late 1973 by two former members of rock band Family, vocalist Roger Chapman and guitarist John "Charlie" Whitney. They were a five-piece band which evolved from the Chapman Whitney Band.

The band were managed by Michael Alphandary and Harvey Goldsmith and were best known for their live performances and their album Red Card (1976).

The band's potential was commented on by former Sounds magazine staff writer and later successful publicist Barbara Charone who stated that “Roger Chapman, Charlie Whitney, and Bobby Tench have been one step away from the big time for so long now that it makes you wonder what the problem is. Everyone knows Family should have made it, that Chapman/Whitney should have made it and that now Streetwalkers should make it. They certainly deserve to", after she saw them performing in support of The Who in 1976.

By 1977 the possibility of becoming more important in UK rock history was diminished by changing musical taste, due to the growing influence of punk rock and new wave music on European culture. The band had successes in the United States and Europe, particularly Germany.

== History ==
=== 1973 Chapman Whitney Streetwalkers the album ===
Chapman and Whitney signed to the Reprise label in 1973 and recorded Chapman Whitney Streetwalkers (1974) with a lineup including other members of Family (co-founder Ric Grech on bass, former bassists John Wetton and Jim Cregan providing bass and backing vocals respectively) and King Crimson (Wetton, plus saxophonist Mel Collins, drummers Ian Wallace and Michael Giles). When writing about the album for Allmusic, Patrick Little commented:

The mixture of rockers and ballads was not Family; yet there was added depth to the music, stemming from the evolved songwriting and from the involvement of so many musicians. "Roxianna" and "Showbiz Joe" were part New Orleans jazz, continuing the Americana feel of Family's last album. "Systematic Stealth" a lovely textured ballad and the slunky "Creature Feature" demonstrate the range of Roger Chapman's unusual voice, from gravelly crooning to just plain gravel. The album's most stunning moments, "Parisienne High Heels" and "Hangman" are brooding and hair raising in their energy and dark themes.

During this period keyboard player Blue Weaver appeared with them at concerts, such as the Reading Festival in the summer of 1974. Bobby Tench from the Jeff Beck Group and Hummingbird was also featured in their fluid, informal touring band line up and appeared at concerts such as in Hyde Park, London, the same year

=== Concert billing, Rockpalast, Streetwalkers formation and Downtown Flyers ===
After recording the album Chapman Whitney Streetwalkers, Chapman and Whitney changed the name of their band to Streetwalkers and Tench joined them as an official band member, when they signed to Phonogram Inc. in 1975. Tench was joined by drummer Nicko McBrain (who would later join Iron Maiden) and bass player Jon Plotel. They had previously appeared on a European broadcast for the German TV show Rockpalast with Chapman and Whitney earlier the same year, billed as the Chapman Whitney Streetwalkers. The band's first album, Downtown Flyers (1975) was released in both USA and Europe but did not achieve the anticipated success in USA, although interest in Europe was more encouraging.

=== Red Card, stadium concerts ===
Their second studio album, the groove-heavy album Red Card (1976) reached #16 in UK album charts and remains a much respected album. The band performed at a series of concerts entitled Who Put the Boot In appearing at UK Football stadiums, during May and June 1976, supporting the Who. The billing for these concerts included the Sensational Alex Harvey Band, Little Feat, Outlaws, and Widowmaker (UK). Streetwalkers were the second act to appear. The band also toured the U.S supporting others such as Wings, 10cc and Joe Cocker.

=== John Peel sessions, final Rockpalast appearance ===
On 12 June 1976 they made their first appearance for John Peel on his "Peel Sessions" recorded by BBC radio, with the line-up of Chapman, Whitney, Tench, Plotel and McBrain and were featured by Peel once more as a "Peel session", on 14 March 1977. On 19 April the same year, they made their final appearance on Rockpalast, with a line-up which included Chapman, Whitney, Tench, keyboardist Brian Johnston, bassist Mickey Feat and drummer David Dowle who later joined Whitesnake.

=== Vicious But Fair and breakup of band ===
By the time their third and final studio album Vicious But Fair (1977) was released, Vertigo had shifted their commercial emphasis to the musical trends of punk rock and new wave music. The euphoria surrounding the band began to diminish and the potential of becoming more established in Europe evaporated. Streetwalkers Live (1977) was their final album and included a rough and ready compilation of poorly recorded tracks, probably released to comply with contractual obligations. In his review of this album for Allmusic, John Dougan mentions the poor quality of the recording and states that: "Chapman tears off a few soulful moments and it can rock". By now the band had broken up and Tench moved on to work with Van Morrisson, along with Feat.

== Band members ==
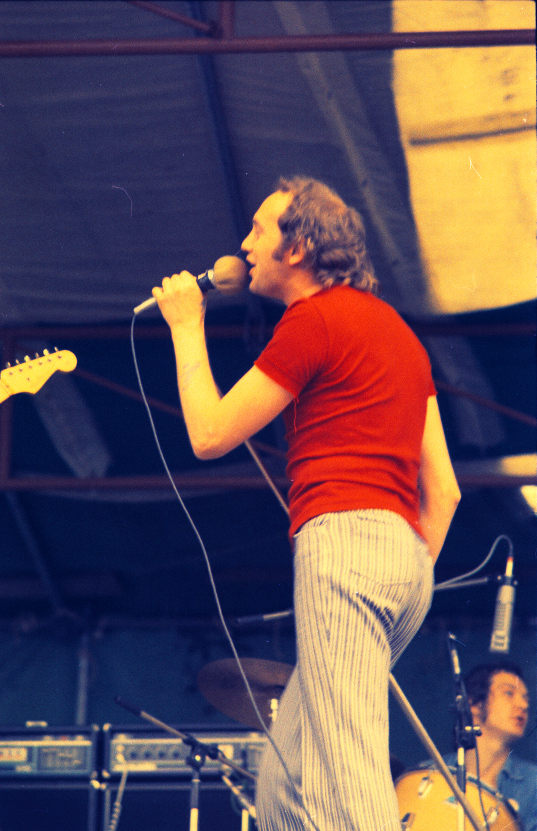
Roger Chapman in 1974

=== Chapman Whitney Streetwalkers musicians 1973-1974 ===
- Roger Chapman - vocals, harmonica and percussion
- Boz Burrell - vocals
- Jim Cregan - vocals
- Linda Lewis - background vocals
- Charlie Whitney - guitar and steel guitar
- Neil Hubbard - guitar
- Bobby Tench - guitar, vocals, percussion, keyboards
- Ric Grech - bass
- John Wetton - bass and vocals
- Blue Weaver - keyboards
- Tim Hinkley - keyboards and vocals
- Max Middleton - keyboards
- Mel Collins - saxophone, clarinet, bass clarinet
- Michael Giles - drums
- Ian Wallace - drums
- Poli Palmer - vibraphone and background vocals
- Godfrey McLean - percussion

=== Streetwalkers musicians 1975-1977 ===
- Roger Chapman - vocals, harmonica and percussion
- Charlie Whitney - guitar, keyboards, slide guitar
- Bobby Tench - guitar, vocals, percussion, keyboards
- Jon Plotel - bass and background vocals
- Mickey Feat - bass
- Brian Johnston - keyboards
- Nicko McBrain - percussion and drums
- David Dowle - drums

== Albums ==
- Chapman Whitney Streetwalkers Reprise K 54017UK/Mercury USA (May 1974)
- Downtown Flyers Vertigo 6360 123 (October 1975)
- Red Card Vertigo 9102 010 UK/Mercury USA (May 1976). Reached #16 in UK album chart
- In Concert BBC (1975)
- Vicious But Fair Vertigo 9102 013UK/Mercury USA (January 1977)
- Live Streetwalkers Vertigo 6641 703 (December 1977)
- Best of Streetwalkers Vertigo 846 661 2(1991)

=== Re-issues ===
- Red Card Repertoire REP 4147-WP CD (2002)
- Downtown Flyers BGO (2002)
- Vicious but Fair See for Miles SEECD 352(1994)
- Live at the BBC Windsong 61 (1994)
- Streetwalkers Live BGO (2004)

=== Compilations ===
- Red Card/Vicious but Fair BGO BGOCD 606 (2005)

=== Singles ===
- "Roxianna"/"Crack" Reprise K14357 (1974) taken from Chapman-Whitney Streetwalkers album
- "Raingame"/"Miller" Vertigo 6059 130 (1975) taken from Downtown Flyers album
- "Daddy Rolling Stone"/"Hole In Your Pocket" Vertigo 6059 144 (1976) taken from Red Card album
- "Chilli Con Carne"/"But You're Beautiful" Vertigo Europe from Vicious but Fair album
