= Jim King (saxophonist) =

British musician and singer (1942–2012)

Alec Woodburn (5 May 1942 in Kettering, Northamptonshire, England – 6 February 2012 in Middlewich, England), known professionally as Jim King, was an original member of the British rock band Family. He played saxophone and harmonica, and sang occasional lead vocals on the band's first two albums, Music in a Doll's House and Family Entertainment. King also sang the entire lead vocal on "Observations From a Hill", a song on the latter album.

Jim, as he became known, formed James King and the Farinas (later just The Farinas), a blues based rock and roll group, with guitarist Charlie Whitney in Leicester in 1962. He sang the lead vocal on the group's single "You Better Stop" b/w "I Like it Like That". When Roger Chapman joined as vocalist in 1966, the group had begun to perform under the name The Roaring Sixties. The name Family was decided upon later.

King left Family in October 1969 owing to health problems and 'musical disagreements'. In addition to session work for Dave Mason and Gordon Jackson, he joined the jazz-rock band Ring of Truth for a brief period, doing a few gigs, then concentrated on composing and playing solo concerts, mostly classical sax with some jazz. In February 2012, he died while living in Cheshire, at the age of 69.
