= John Palmer (musician) =

British rock musician (1943–2025)

John "Poli" Palmer
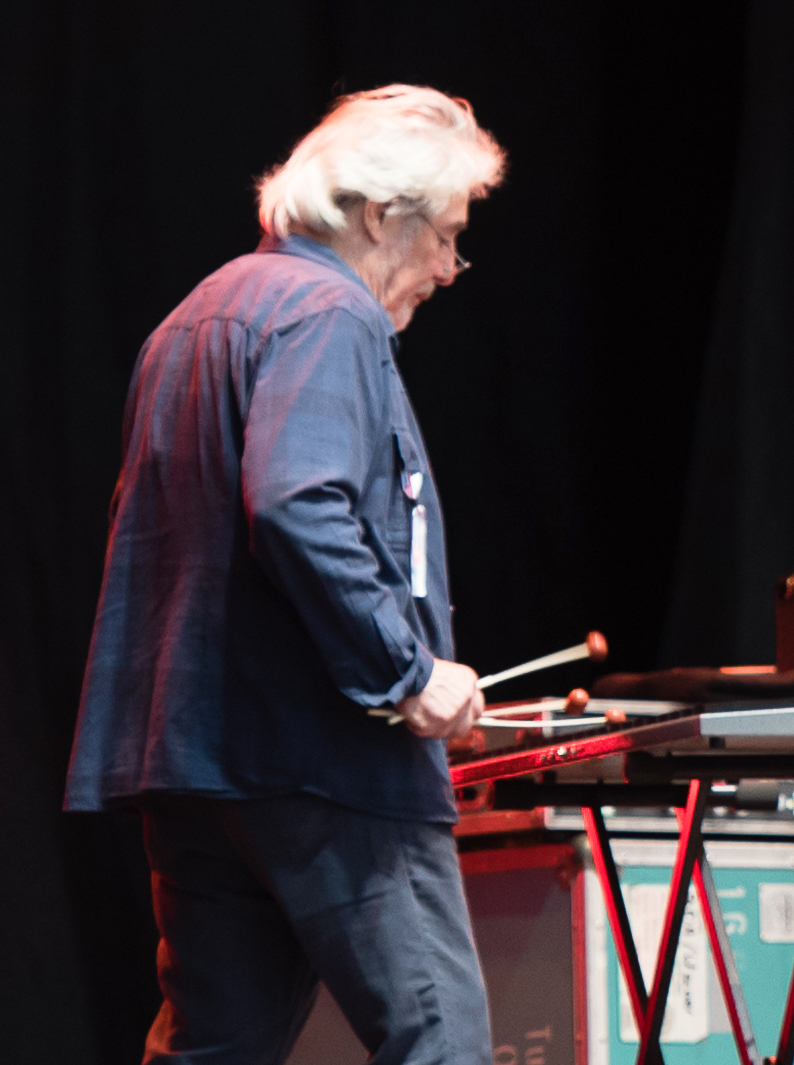
- Palmer performing with Roger Chapman in 2018

Background information
- Born: John Michael Palmer; 26 May 1943; Worcester, England
- Died: 21 July 2025 (aged 82)
- Instruments: Vibraphone; keyboards; flute; drums
- Years active: 1960s–2025
- Formerly of: Blossom Toes; Bakerloo; Family

John Michael "Poli" Palmer (26 May 1943 – 21 July 2025) was an English rock musician who was a key member in the progressive rock band Family. Though he was not an original member, he was regarded as being integral to the group's sound. He played the vibraphone, flute, piano, synthesizers and occasional drums, and he was with the band from late 1969 until late 1972.

== Life and career ==
Palmer originally played in a group called The Hellions, which featured future Traffic members Jim Capaldi and Dave Mason, Capaldi and Palmer later formed Deep Feeling, which also included future Spooky Tooth member Luther Grosvenor. Palmer was briefly involved later with acts such as the Blossom Toes, Bakerloo and Ian Matthews' Southern Comfort, formed by the former Fairport Convention frontman of that name. He was in the folk rock band Eclection with whom he performed at the 1969 Isle of Wight Festival, before joining Family.

Palmer replaced Jim King in Family and immediately went to work on the group's third album, A Song For Me. Many of that album's songs had to be re-arranged, as they were written with King's saxophone and harmonica in mind. Palmer rose to the challenge, transforming songs with his different instruments. "Drowned in Wine" became a full-blown rocker with his overamplified flute, and his vibraphones added a jazz touch to the blues number "Love Is a Sleeper." A Song For Me was released in January 1970 to rave reviews, and Family seemed re-invigorated by Palmer's arrival.

Palmer contributed to the next two Family albums, Anyway and Fearless. On the latter album, released in 1971, Palmer contributed the jazz instrumental "Crinkly Grin" and the song "Larf and Sing," which he sang lead on himself. After 1972's Bandstand and a U.S. tour as the warmup act for Elton John, Palmer left Family to form a group with fellow Family alumnus Ric Grech and Mitch Mitchell, but that effort never got anywhere.

Palmer's other credits include work on two albums from British soul singer Linda Lewis, 1972's Lark and 1973's Fathoms Deep. He also worked with Peter Frampton, and Elkie Brooks, he made guest appearances on albums from the post-Family band Streetwalkers and on solo albums from former Family lead singer Roger Chapman. Palmer contributed tuned percussion on Pete Townshend's 1982 solo album All the Best Cowboys Have Chinese Eyes.

He wrote the music for the rock opera Hero, produced in 1976 by the Australian Opera in Sydney.

In 1985, Palmer released Human Error, a solo record featuring King Crimson and Bad Company alumnus Boz Burrell and Mel Collins also of King Crimson fame. It featured the Fairlight CMI synthesizer extensively and was recorded in Burrell's studio. In 1986, he produced and provided Fairlight programming to the Kevin Ayers release As Close as You Think, recorded at the same studio.

In his later years, Palmer split time between gigging and music computer work. He died on 21 July 2025, at the age of 82.

== Sources ==
- "News, pictures, reviews, biography, videos, best songs, discography, etc". NME. 1 August 2009. Archived from the original on 1 August 2009.
