= Family (British band) =

English rock band

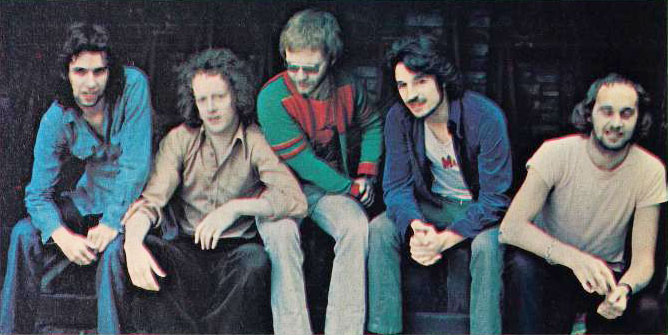
- Family in 1972. Left to right: John "Charlie" Whitney, Jim Cregan, Rob Townsend, John "Poli" Palmer, Roger Chapman

Background information
- Origin: Leicester, England
- Genres: Progressive rock; hard rock; psychedelic rock; jazz rock
- Years active: 1966–1973; 2013–2016
- Labels: Liberty; Reprise; Raft; United Artists
- Spinoffs: Streetwalkers
- Past members: Roger Chapman; John "Charlie" Whitney; Jim King; Ric Grech; Harry Ovenall; Rob Townsend; John Weider; John "Poli" Palmer; John Wetton; Jim Cregan; Tony Ashton

Family were an English rock band, active from late 1966 to October 1973, and again from 2013 to 2016 for a series of live shows. Their style has been characterised as progressive rock, as their sound often explored other genres, incorporating elements of styles such as folk, psychedelia, acid rock, jazz fusion, and rock and roll. The band achieved recognition in the United Kingdom through their albums, club and concert tours, and appearances at festivals.

Family's rotating membership during their relatively short existence led to a diversity of sound on their various albums, with lead vocalist Roger Chapman the only member who stayed in the band throughout its existence. The group have been described as an "odd band loved by a small but rabid group of fans".

== History ==
=== Early years (1966–1969) ===
Family formed in late 1966 in Leicester, England, from the remaining members of a group that was previously known as The Farinas and later briefly The Roaring Sixties, whose sound was grounded in rhythm and blues though they did not record under that name. The Farinas originally consisted of John "Charlie" Whitney, Tim Kirchin (born around 1944, Birstall, Leicestershire died circa 2000), Harry Ovenall (born Richard Harry Ovenall, 12 September 1943, Peterborough, Cambridgeshire), and Jim King, forming at Leicester Art College in 1962. Ric Grech replaced Kirchin on bass in 1965 and Roger Chapman joined the following year on vocals. The American record producer Kim Fowley suggested they call themselves "The Family" as they regularly wore double-breasted suits in performances, giving themselves a mafia style appearance, a look they soon abandoned in favour of a more casual dress code.

The group played the music club The Marquee regularly and other London clubs including The 100 Club and Sybilla's in Swallow Street. Through their friend, Mim Scala, they arranged Jimmy Miller to produce their first single and met manager John Gilbert. Because of their association with Miller, Steve Winwood helped with the recording. Shortly afterwards, Ovenall became disillusioned with the group's move away from soul music towards psychedelia and was concerned about the management. He subsequently decided to leave the band. Family's debut single "Scene Through The Eye of a Lens/Gypsy Woman" was released by Liberty Records in October 1967 but was not a success. Ovenall was replaced by Rob Townsend.

Family in 1968. Left to right: John "Charlie" Whitney (top), Jim King (bottom), Rob Townsend (centre), Ric Grech (bottom), Roger Chapman (top)

The band signed with the Reprise Records label (the first UK band signed directly to UK and US Reprise) and their debut album Music in a Doll's House, was recorded during early 1968. Miller was originally slated to produce it, but he was tied up with production of the Rolling Stones' album Beggars Banquet and he is credited as co-producer on only two tracks, "The Breeze" and "Peace of Mind". The bulk of the album was produced by former Traffic member Dave Mason, and recorded at London's Olympic Studios with engineers Eddie Kramer and George Chkiantz. 18 year old Mike Batt arranged string and brass overdubs, notably on "The Chase", "Mellowing Grey" and "Old Songs, New Songs" but was uncredited. "Old Songs, New Songs" also included an uncredited tenor sax solo from Tubby Hayes. Mason also contributed one composition to the album, "Never Like This", the only song recorded by Family not written by a band member, and the group also backed Mason on "Little Woman", the B side of his February 1968 single "Just For You". Alongside Pink Floyd, Soft Machine, The Move, and The Nice, Family quickly became one of the premier attractions on the burgeoning UK psychedelic/progressive "underground" scene. Their lifestyle and exploits during this period provided some of the inspiration for the 1969 novel Groupie by Jenny Fabian (who lived in the group's Chelsea house for some time) and to Johnny Byrne. Family featured in the book under the pseudonym, 'Relation'.

Music in a Doll's House was released in July 1968 and charted at number 35 in the UK, thanks to strong support from BBC Radio 1's John Peel. Now widely acknowledged as a classic of British psychedelic rock, it showcased many of the stylistic and production features that are archetypal of the genre. The album's highly original sound was characterised by Chapman's vocals, rooted in the blues and R&B, combined with several unusual instruments for a rock band, courtesy of the presence of multi-instrumentalists Grech and King, including saxophones, violin, cello, and harmonica.

Family's 1969 follow-up, Family Entertainment, toned down the psychedelic experimentation of their previous offering to some extent, reaching number six in the UK Albums Chart, and featured the single "The Weaver's Answer", although the group reportedly had no control over the mixing and choice of tracks, or the running order of the songs.

With the UK success of Family's first two albums, the band undertook a tour of the United States in April 1969, but it was beset by problems. Halfway through the tour, Grech unexpectedly left the band to join the new supergroup Blind Faith; on the recommendation of tour manager Peter Grant, Grech was replaced by John Weider, previously of Eric Burdon and The Animals. A further setback occurred during their first concert at Bill Graham's Fillmore East, whilst sharing the bill with Ten Years After and The Nice – during his stage routine, Chapman lost control of his microphone stand, which flew in Graham's direction, an act Graham took to be deliberate; Chapman performed the following shows with his hands by his sides, and by the end of the tour, he had lost his voice; Family's reputation in the US never recovered and they ultimately never achieved great recognition there. Returning to the UK, the band performed at The Rolling Stones' Hyde Park gig and the Isle of Wight Festival that summer. In late 1969, Jim King was asked to leave Family due to "erratic behaviour" and was replaced by multi-instrumentalist John "Poli" Palmer.

=== Later years (1970–1973) ===
In 1970, Family played a few more gigs in the United States, appearing in San Francisco and Boston. In early 1970, they released their third studio album, A Song for Me; produced by the band, it became the highest-charting album the band had released, reaching No. 4 on the UK Albums Chart. The album itself was a blend of hard rock and folk rock. Family's new line-up played at major rock festivals that summer, including the Kralingen Music Festival in the Netherlands and the Isle of Wight Festival for the second year in a row. The band appeared in the documentary film Message to Love about the latter festival.

Family's follow-up album Anyway, released in late 1970, had its first half consist of new material recorded live at Fairfield Halls in Croydon, England, with the second half a set of new songs recorded in the studio, and reached number seven on the UK chart. In March 1971 the compilation album, Old Songs New Songs, (which contained remixes and rare tracks) was released, but in June Weider left Family to join Stud. He was replaced by former Mogul Thrash bassist John Wetton, who had just declined an invitation from Robert Fripp to join King Crimson. The band performed at the Glastonbury Free Festival 1971, filmed by Nicolas Roeg for the 1972 documentary Glastonbury Fayre.

As with Grech in Family's original line-up, Wetton also shared vocal duties with Chapman, and this line-up soon released Family's highest-charting single "In My Own Time/Seasons" which reached number four, and the album Fearless in October 1971, which charted in both the UK and the US. In 1972, another album, Bandstand was released, which leaned more towards hard rock than art rock, featuring the singles "Burlesque" in late 1972, and "My Friend the Sun", which was released in early 1973.

In mid-1972, John Wetton left Family to join a new line-up of King Crimson and was replaced by bassist Jim Cregan, and at the end of that year, John "Poli" Palmer also left the band and was replaced by keyboardist Tony Ashton, previously of Ashton, Gardner and Dyke. After Wetton's departure (but before Palmer's exit), Family toured the United States and Canada as the support act for Elton John, but their performances were often greeted with silence and Poli Palmer later recalled that "the only clapping in this huge stadium would be the guys doing the PA".

In 1973, Family released the largely ignored It's Only a Movie (and on their own label, Raft, distributed by Warner/Reprise), which would be their last studio album, followed by another tour.

Family gave their final concert at the Hawthorn Building of Leicester Polytechnic on 13 October 1973. Many of its members went on to different musical projects; Roger Chapman and John "Charlie" Whitney formed the band Streetwalkers; John Wetton played with King Crimson and eventually became the lead singer of the band Asia. Rob Townsend was a member of Medicine Head between 1973 and 1975. He has been a member of The Blues Band since 1979 and of The Manfreds since 1991. Ric Grech died of kidney and liver failure in 1990 at the age of 43, as a result of alcoholism. Tony Ashton died in 2001 at the age of 55 of cancer. Jim King died on 6 February 2012 in Middlewich, Cheshire, at the age of 69. Wetton died on 31 January 2017, at the age of 67.

=== Reunion performances (2013–2016) ===
In September 2012 the band announced a one-off reunion gig on 2 February 2013 at the O2 Shepherds Bush Empire, London featuring Roger Chapman, Poli Palmer, Rob Townsend and Jim Cregan Demand for tickets was so great that an extra show was scheduled for the previous night as well and an expanded line-up of the band (also featuring Chapman's regular back-up musicians Paul Hirsh, John Lingwood, Nick Payn, Gary Twigg and Geoff Whitehorn, billed as "The In Laws") played to sell-out audiences. The setlist on both nights included: Top of the Hill, Drowned in Wine, Holding the Compass, Part of the Load, Ready to Go, Crinkly Grin, Burning Bridges, No Mule's Fool, Sat'dy Barfly, Between Blue and Me, Hung Up Down, Burlesque, In My Own Time. Encore 1: Weaver's Answer; Encore 2: My Friend the Sun, Sweet Desiree. During these performances Chapman paid warm tributes to absent band members Ric Grech, Tony Ashton, Jim King, John Weider, John Wetton and Charlie Whitney during the band's performance. The band went on to appear at the Rockin' the Park Festival at Clumber Park in Notts on 16 August 2013.

The limited edition Family box set Once Upon a Time, won the Storm Thorgerson Grand Design award at the 2013 Progressive Music Awards.

Family again played gigs in the UK in 2014 and 2015. In 2016 they appeared at festivals in England and Italy, as well as two gigs in London on 17 and 18 December and one in Leicester on 22 December, which were billed as the band's last shows. For these gigs, Chapman, Palmer and Cregan were joined by five other musicians.

== Artistry ==
Family's sound was distinguished by several factors. The vocals of Roger Chapman, described as a "bleating vibrato" and an "electric goat", were considered unique, although Chapman was trying to emulate the voices of R&B and soul singers Little Richard and Ray Charles, with some reviewers noting however that Chapman's voice could be grating and irritating occasionally. John "Charlie" Whitney was an accomplished and innovative guitarist, and Family's often complex song arrangements were made possible through having multi-instrumentalists like Ric Grech, Jim King and Poli Palmer in the band and access to keyboards such as the Hammond organ, the new Mellotron, violin, flute and vibraphone. The band's sound has been variously described as progressive rock, psychedelic rock, acid rock, folk rock, jazz fusion, not to mention "British art rock," and hard rock.

Family were particularly known for their live performances; one reviewer describing the band as "one of the wildest, most innovative groups of the underground rock scene", noting that they produced "some of the rawest, most intense performances on stage in rock history" and "that the Jimi Hendrix Experience were afraid to follow them at festivals".

Family was an influence on Jethro Tull, with Ian Anderson noting that the band were particularly underrated. Both in his vocal sound and style and his dramatic stage presentation, Chapman was also a strong early influence on Peter Gabriel.

== Personnel ==
=== Members ===
Final members

- Roger Chapman – vocals, harmonica, saxophones, percussion (1966–1973, 2013–2016)
- Rob Townsend – drums, percussion (1967–1973, 2013–2016)
- John "Poli" Palmer – keyboards, flute, vibraphone, synthesisers, backing vocals (1969–1972, 2013–2016; died 2025)
- Jim Cregan – bass, guitars, backing vocals (1972–1973, 2013–2016)

Former members

- John "Charlie" Whitney – guitars, banjo, keyboards (1966–1973)
- Jim King – saxophones, harmonica, tin whistle, piano, vocals (1966–1969; died 2012)
- Ric Grech – bass, violin, cello, vocals (1966–1969; died 1990)
- Harry Ovenall – drums, percussion (1966–1967)
- John Weider – bass, guitar, violin, backing vocals (1969–1971; died 2025)
- John Wetton – bass, guitar, keyboards, vocals (1971–1972; died 2017)
- Tony Ashton – keyboards, accordion, mellotron, backing vocals (1972–1973; died 2001)

=== Guest musicians ===
- Dave Mason – mellotron (on Music in a Doll's House)
- Nicky Hopkins – piano (on Family Entertainment)
- George Bruno – organ (on A Song for Me)
- Linda Lewis – backing vocals (on Bandstand)
- Peter Hope-Evans – harmonica (on It's Only a Movie)
- Geoff Whitehorn – guitar, backing vocals (2013)
- John Lingwood – drums, percussion (2013)
- Gary Twigg – bass (2013)
- Paul Hirsh – keyboards (2013)
- Nick Payn – saxophone, harmonica (2013)

=== Producers ===
- John Gilbert – Music in a Doll's House and Family Entertainment (executive producer)
- Dave Mason – Music in a Doll's House
- Jimmy Miller – Music in a Doll's House
- Glyn Johns – Family Entertainment
- George Chkiantz – A Song for Me, Anyway, Fearless, Bandstand, It's Only a Movie

=== Lineups ===
Late 1966 – October 1967	October 1967 – April 1969	April 1969 – Late 1969	Late 1969 – June 1971
Roger Chapman – lead vocals, harmonica, percussion; Jim King – saxophones, backing and lead vocals, harmonica, keyboards; John "Charlie" Whitney – guitars, keyboards; Ric Grech – bass, backing and lead vocals, violin, cello; Harry Ovenall – drums, percussion	Roger Chapman – lead vocals, harmonica, percussion; Jim King – saxophones, backing and lead vocals, harmonica, keyboards; John "Charlie" Whitney – guitars, keyboards; Ric Grech – bass, backing and lead vocals, violin, cello; Rob Townsend – drums, percussion	Roger Chapman – lead vocals, percussion; Jim King – saxophones, backing and lead vocals, harmonica, keyboards; John "Charlie" Whitney – guitars, keyboards; Rob Townsend – drums, percussion; John Weider – bass, backing vocals, guitars, violin	Roger Chapman – lead vocals, percussion; John "Charlie" Whitney – guitars, keyboards; Rob Townsend – drums, percussion; John Weider – bass, backing vocals, guitars, violin; John "Poli" Palmer – keyboards, backing vocals, flute, vibes
June 1971 – Mid-1972	Mid-1972 – End 1972	End 1972 – Late October 1973	Late October 1973 – September 2012
Roger Chapman – lead vocals, percussion; John "Charlie" Whitney – guitars, keyboards; Rob Townsend – drums, percussion; John "Poli" Palmer – keyboards, backing vocals, flute, vibes; John Wetton – bass, backing and lead vocals, guitars, keyboards	Roger Chapman – lead vocals, percussion; John "Charlie" Whitney – guitars, keyboards; Rob Townsend – drums, percussion; John "Poli" Palmer – keyboards, backing vocals, flute, vibes; Jim Cregan – bass, guitars	Roger Chapman – lead vocals; John "Charlie" Whitney – guitars; Rob Townsend – drums, percussion; Jim Cregan – bass, guitars; Tony Ashton – keyboards, backing vocals	Disbanded
September 2012 – December 2016
Roger Chapman – lead vocals; Rob Townsend – drums, percussion; Jim Cregan – guitars; John "Poli" Palmer – vibes; With: Nick Payn – saxophones, harmonica; Geoff Whitehorn – guitars, backing vocals; Paul Hirsh – keyboards; Gary Twigg – bass; John Lingwood – drums, percussion

== Discography ==
=== Studio albums ===
- Music in a Doll's House (UK & US Reprise, 1968)
- Family Entertainment (UK & US Reprise, 1969)
- A Song for Me (UK & US Reprise, 1970)
- Anyway (UK Reprise & US United Artists, 1970)
- Fearless (UK Reprise & US United Artists, 1971)
- Bandstand (UK Reprise & US United Artists, 1972)
- It's Only a Movie (UK Raft & US United Artists, 1973)
