= John "Charlie" Whitney =

English rock guitarist

- Born: Richard John Whitney; 24 June 1944 (age 82); Skipton, West Riding of Yorkshire, England
- Genres: Rock, blues-rock
- Occupation: Musician
- Instruments: Guitar, piano, violin, keyboards, accordion, mellotron, sitar, banjo
- Years active: 1964–present
- Labels: Reprise, RCA, Hux, Windsong, Vertigo, Mystic (UK), Castle
- Formerly of: The Farinas, Family, Axis Point, Streetwalkers, Los Racketeeros, The Roaring Sixties

Richard John Whitney, also known as John "Charlie" Whitney, John Whitney and Charlie Whitney, is an English rock musician and a founder member of the bands Family, Streetwalkers and Axis Point.

== Career ==
Whitney was born in Skipton, West Riding of Yorkshire. He attended Leicester Art College in 1962. His first appearance was at Fleckney village hall, near Leicester, with his mates from Great Glen, Alistair Sutton, Tony Wilson and Arthur Sloper. Their second gig was cancelled due to snow and they never reformed. He then formed his own band known as the Farinas. They played rhythm and blues, and featured Jim King on saxophone and vocals, bassist Tim Kirchin and drummer Harry Overnall. They performed songs by Chuck Berry and the Coasters before releasing the single "You'd Better Stop" in August 1964. Later, Ric Grech replaced Tim Kirchin and Roger Chapman joined as the principal lead singer, giving a heavier blues sound before renaming the band the Roaring Sixties.

During 1966, the Roaring Sixties were renamed Family and they replaced their drummer Overnall with Rob Townsend. The band issued their first single as Family, titled "Scene Through The Eye Of A Lens/Gypsy Woman" in 1967 and their debut album Music in a Doll's House followed in July 1968. Family's heavy, experimental rock music gained them a reputation as a progressive underground band. By 1970, with the release of their albums A Song For Me and Anyway, they made an appearance at the third Isle of Wight Festival on 28 August 1970. Although Family proved to be popular in the UK and continental Europe, success in the US eluded them, and in 1973 the group broke up.

Whitney and Chapman wrote most of Family's songs together as a team. Whitney also composed two tracks, the instrumental "Summer '67" and the childlike folk song "Processions", about a small boy enjoying a day at the seashore.

Whitney then formed Streetwalkers with Chapman in 1973. This new band included vocalist and guitarist Bobby Tench, from the Jeff Beck Group and Hummingbird, and future Iron Maiden drummer Nicko McBrain, who later moved on to play with Pat Travers and bassist Jon Plotel. They signed to the Vertigo label, recording an album titled Streetwalkers (1974). The band broke up in 1977, ending eleven years of the Whitney-Chapman musical partnership.

Whitney remained active in rock music. He reunited with Rob Townsend, his bandmate from Family, to form Axis Point in 1978. The line-up for this band included piano player Eddie Hardin, vocalist and guitarist Bobby Tench from Streetwalkers and former Taste bassist Richard McCracken. When Axis Point broke up in 1980, Whitney formed Los Racketeeros, a live unit which played blues and bluegrass music. Los Racketeeros recorded a debut album in 1995 with a line-up including Alan Rogers, Pete Tomlyn, and Tony Taylor. Whitney released a solo album in 1999, and played concerts with Robert A. Roberts, a singer-songwriter, vocalist, harmonica player and guitarist, who had been a founding member of the London Bluesband Roadhouse. They released a CD as The Whitney-Roberts Combo experimenting with folk music.

== Discography ==
=== Family ===
==== Albums ====
- Music in a Doll's House, Reprise (1968)
- Family Entertainment, Reprise (1969)
- A Song For Me, Reprise (1970)
- Anyway, Reprise (1971) US (United Artists Records)
- Fearless, Reprise (1971) US (United Artists Records)
- Bandstand, Reprise (1972) US (United Artists Records)
- It's Only a Movie, Raft (1973) US (United Artists Records)
- Peel Sessions, Strange Fruit (1989) US (United Artists Records)
- BBC Radio 1 In Concert, Windsong (1991)
- Family Live Mystic, (2003)
- BBC Volume 1: 1968–1969, Hux (2004)
- BBC Volume 2: 1970–1973, Hux (2004)

==== Singles ====
- "Scene Through The Eye of A Lens" / "Gypsy Woman", Liberty (1967)
- "Me My Friend" / "Hey Mr. Policeman", Reprise (1968)
- "Second Generation Woman" / "Hometown", Reprise (1968)
- "No Mules Fool" / "Good Friend Of Mine", Reprise (1969)
- "Today" / "Song For Lots Reprise", Reprise (1970)
- "Strange Band" / "The Weaver's Answer" / "Hung Up Down", Reprise (1970)
- "In My Own Time" / "Seasons", Reprise (1971) (US b/w "Anyway" United Artists (1971))
- "Burlesque" / "The Rockin' R's", Reprise (1972)
- "My Friend The Sun" / "Glove", Reprise (1973)
- "Boom Bang" / "Sweet Desiree", Raft (1973)
- "Sweet Desiree" / "Drink To You", Raft (1973)

==== Compilation albums ====
- Old Songs New Songs, Reprise (1971)
- Best Of Family, Reprise (1974)
- From Past Archives, Teldec (1980)
- Best Of Family, Castle (1990)
- A's & B's, Castle (1992)
- A Family Selection, Castle (2000)
- Roger Chapman, Family & Friends (5-CD boxset), Mystic (2006)

=== Chapman-Whitney ===
- Streetwalkers, Reprise, K 54017 (1974)

=== Streetwalkers ===
==== Albums ====
- Downtown Flyers, Mercury LP SRM-1-1060 (US), Vertigo 6360 123 (1975)
- Red Card, Mercury SMR-1-1083 (US), Vertigo 9102 010, Repertoire REP 4147-WP (CD) (1976)
- Vicious But Fair, Mercury LP SRM-1-1135 (US), Vertigo, 9102 012 (1977)
- Streetwalkers Live, Vertigo, 6641-703 (1977)
- Best of Streetwalkers, Vertigo, CD, CA, LP, 846-661 (1990)
- BBC Radio One Live, Windsong, CD (1995)

==== Singles ====
- "Roxianna" / "Crack", Reprise (1974)
- "Raingame" / "Miller", Vertigo (1975)
- "Daddy Rolling Stone" / "Hole In Your Pocket", Vertigo (1976)
- "Chilli Con Carne" / "But You're Beautiful", Vertigo (1977)

=== Axis Point ===
- Axis Point, RCA (1979)
- Boast of the Town, RCA (1980)
