= George Chkiantz =

British audio engineer

George Ervand Chkiantz (March 1944 - 2024) was a British recording engineer, based in London, who has been responsible for the engineering on a number of well-known albums, many of which are considered classics, owing in part to the quality of the recordings.

== Career ==
Chkiantz was the recording engineer of the Small Faces self-titled second album (1967), recorded for Andrew Loog Oldham's Immediate Records label. Chkiantz was a staff engineer at Olympic Studios at the same time that the Jimi Hendrix Experience was recording Axis: Bold as Love. During the session with the Small Faces, Chkiantz engineered the song "Green Circles", which represented the first use of mono flanging on a pop record; he subsequently perfected the technique on their landmark 1967 single "Itchycoo Park".

Upon hearing the result, Jimi Hendrix and his engineer, Eddie Kramer, applied Chkiantz's concepts, creating stereo phasing on the songs "Bold as Love" and "Little Wing". Deciding to utilize his abilities more fully, Hendrix hired Chkiantz to customise the studio's equipment for Axis. Chkiantz was credited in the production as "tape operator." Hendrix used to refer to Chkiantz and Kramer's stereo phasing technique as the sound he had been "hearing in his dreams".

Chkiantz also worked with the group Family, who appeared on the bill with the Rolling Stones at Hyde Park in July 1969, before assisting Glyn Johns on the Stones' album Let It Bleed. In the late 1960s and throughout the 1970s, he worked with the Soft Machine, Savoy Brown, Ten Years After, King Crimson and Led Zeppelin.

== Selective discography ==
As engineer unless otherwise specified:

- The Beatles: "All You Need Is Love" (second engineer)
- Blind Faith: Blind Faith
- Family: A Song for Me
- Focus: Focus 3
- Hawkwind: In Search of Space; Masters of the Universe (both as co-producer)
- High Tide: High Tide
- King Crimson: Starless and Bible Black; Red; USA; The Night Watch
- Led Zeppelin: II; IV; Houses of the Holy; Physical Graffiti
- Rolling Stones: It's Only Rock 'N Roll (overdub engineer)
- Savoy Brown: Street Corner Talking
- Slade: Old, New, Borrowed and Blue
- Small Faces: Small Faces
- Soft Machine: Volume Two
- Ten Years After: Ssssh; Cricklewood Green; Anthology 1967-1971
- The Master Musicians of Joujouka: Brian Jones Presents the Pipes of Pan at Joujouka
