= Rob Townsend =

English rock and blues drummer (born 1947)

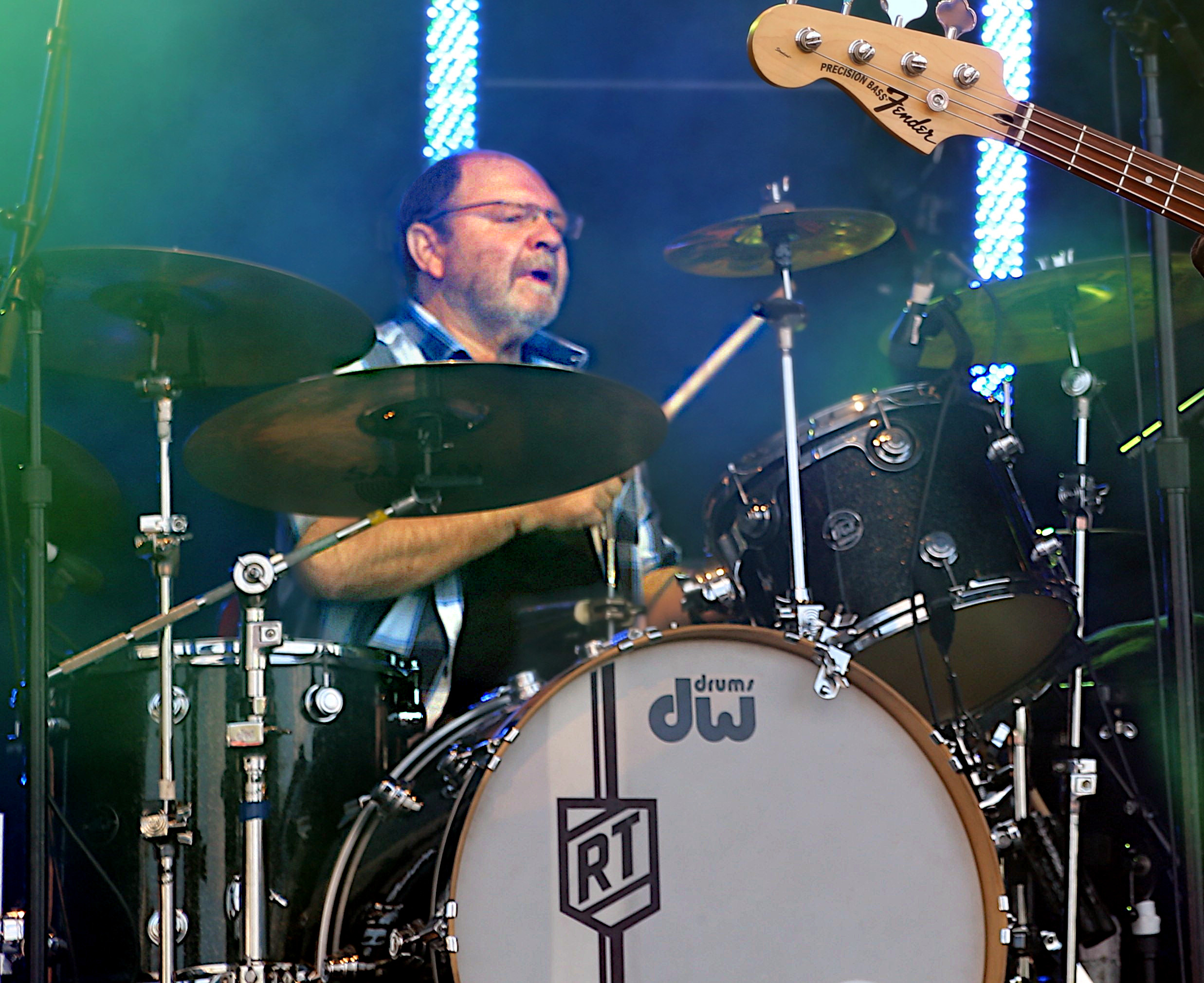
- Townsend with The Blues Band in 2013

Background information
- Born: Robert Townsend; 7 July 1947 (age 79); Leicester, England
- Genre: Rock
- Occupation: Musician
- Instrument: Drums
- Years active: 1967–present
- Labels: Arista, Polydor, RCA

Rob Townsend (born 7 July 1947) is an English rock and blues drummer. He was the drummer for progressive rock band Family and later The Blues Band.

== Biography ==
Townsend was born near Frog Island, Leicester, England, where he spent his teenage years playing in various bands, such as the Beatniks, Broodly Hoo and Legay. He became drummer for Family, replacing Harry Overnall in 1967. Family broke up in 1973 and Townsend joined Medicine Head. After eighteen months he left Medicine Head and spent much of the late 1970s as freelance session drummer for Peter Skellern, George Melly and Bill Wyman amongst others. During this time he played drums for Kevin Ayers and Charlie Whitney's Axis Point.

In 1982 Townsend joined The Blues Band, in a line up including Paul Jones, guitarists Dave Kelly and Tom McGuinness also bassist Gary Fletcher. In 1991 he also joined Jones and McGuinness as part of the Manfred Mann splinter band The Manfreds, recording and touring, as well as backing other performers including Georgie Fame, Colin Blunstone, Long John Baldry, and Chris Farlowe.

Townsend once said in an interview:

I have come home from tours absolutely dead on my feet and I will get a call to go and play at a local pub because their regular drummer can't do it and I say yes…When I am not playing I go to drum shops or music shows. I just love it. I feel so lucky to be able to be doing something I love to do and to be able to earn a living from it.

Townsend mentioned jazz greats Buddy Rich and Gene Krupa as influences in the same interview.
