= Roger Chapman =

English rock vocalist (born 1942)

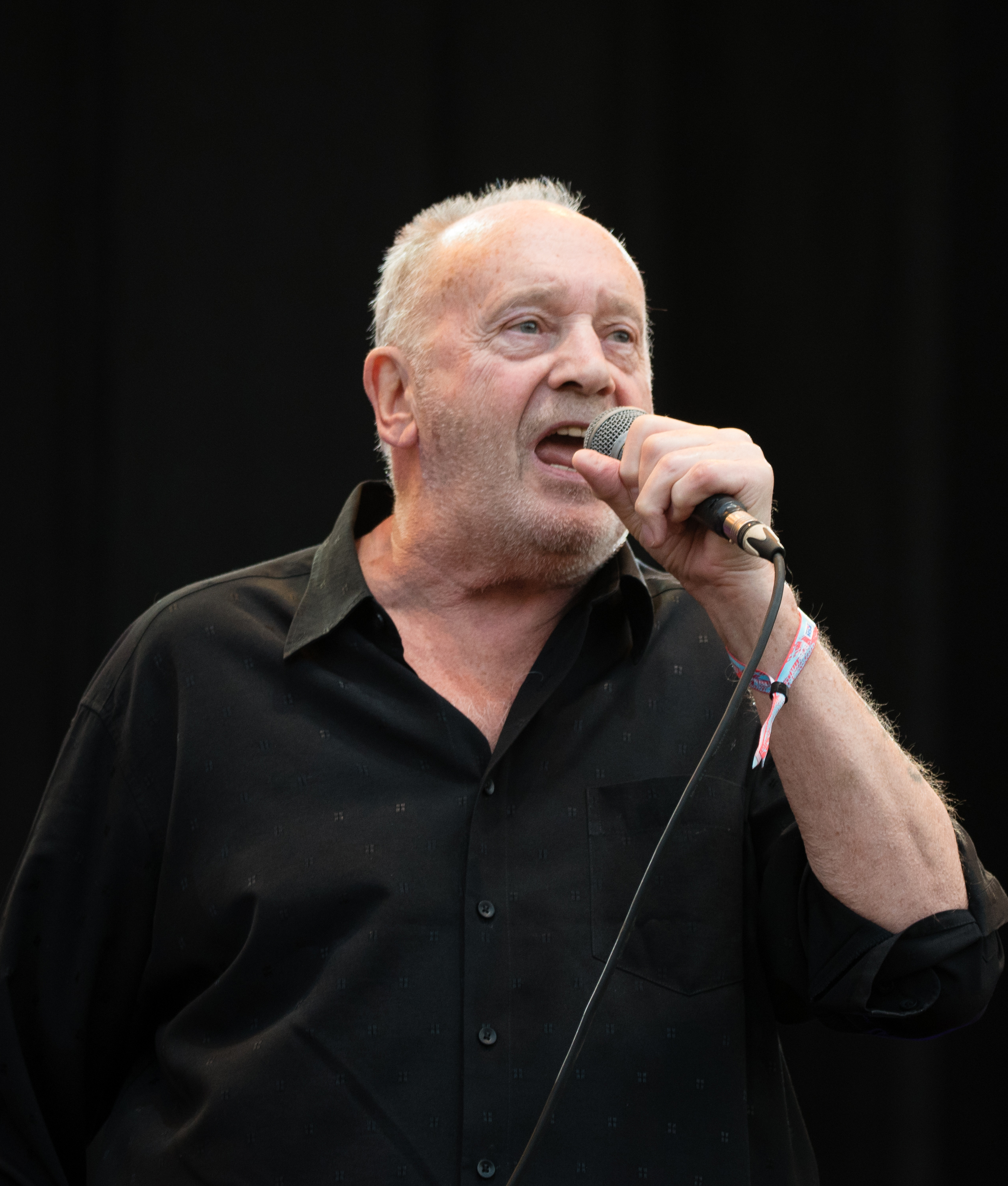
- Chapman in 2018

Background information
- Also known as: Chappo
- Born: Roger Maxwell Chapman; 8 April 1942 (age 84); Leicester, England
- Origin: English
- Genres: Rock, blues rock, art rock, progressive rock
- Occupations: Musician; singer
- Instruments: Vocals; harmonica; saxophone
- Labels: Liberty; Vertigo; Reprise; Windsong; Mystic (UK); Castle

Roger Maxwell Chapman (born 8 April 1942 in Leicester), also known as Chappo, is an English rock vocalist. He is best known as a member of the progressive rock band Family, which he joined along with Charlie Whitney in 1966, and also the rock and R&B band Streetwalkers formed in 1974. His idiosyncratic brand of showmanship when performing and vocal vibrato led him to become a cult figure on the British rock scene. Chapman is claimed to have said that he was trying to sing like both Little Richard and his idol Ray Charles. Since the early 1980s he has spent much of his time in Germany and has made occasional appearances there and elsewhere.

In Germany, he was awarded an Artist of the Year award during the 1980s, followed by a Lifetime Achievement Award in 2004.

== Career ==
Chapman was originally the vocalist for Farinas, who released the single "You'd Better Stop" b/w "I Like It Like That" in August 1964. However, lead vocals on that single were performed by Jim King. He moved on to join The Roaring Sixties who were renamed Family in 1966.

== Family ==
In 1967 Family released their first single "Scene Through The Eye of a Lens", which became a psychedelic favorite. Chapman wrote most of Family's songs with Charlie Whitney and their debut album Music in a Doll's House was released in 1968. Their bluesy, experimental rock music gained them a reputation as a progressive underground band.

The release of Family Entertainment (1969), A Song for Me (1970) and Anyway (1970) established Family as a fast and loud rock band also capable of producing the most intense acoustic music in the British underground music scene at that time. Their single "The Weaver's Answer" from the Family Entertainment album was a hit in 1969. On 28 August 1970 they appeared at the third Isle of Wight Festival. Although the band was popular in U.K and Europe, success in the U.S. eluded them and in 1973 the band broke up.

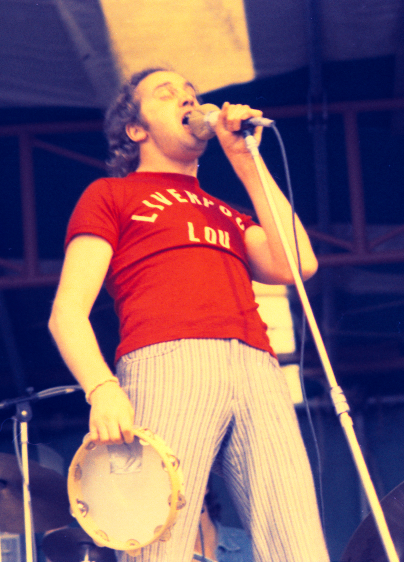
Roger Chapman performing in 1974

== Chapman-Whitney and Streetwalkers band ==
Chapman formed Chapman-Whitney with Whitney at the end of 1973. They signed to the Vertigo label and recorded the album Chapman Whitney Streetwalkers (1974) with a line-up including other members of Family and King Crimson, as well as future Iron Maiden member Nicko McBrain.

Chapman-Whitney morphed their band into Streetwalkers, a polished album-oriented rock band who played white soul, taking a different direction to Family. The band released Downtown Flyers (1975) and then recorded the groove-heavy album Red Card (1976), which was released in the U.K in 1976, the album remaining much-respected by music fans and the music press. Two more albums followed before the band broke up in 1977, ending eleven years of the Whitney-Chapman musical partnership.

== Solo ==
In 1979 Chapman began a solo career and recorded his first solo album Chappo. His backing band became known as 'The Shortlist' and he toured Europe extensively. Mike Oldfield's song "Shadow on the Wall" from the album Crises (1983) featured Chapman on vocals and became a hit. He appeared as a guest artist on the second Box of Frogs album, Strange Land (1986), singing lead vocals on two songs. Chapman went on to record Walking the Cat (1989) and Hybrid and Low Down (1990).

During the next years eleven more studio and live recordings were released. His album Hide Go Seek was produced by former Family bassist Jim Cregan and released in May 2009. He appeared at the Rhythm Festival on Saturday 21 August 2010 with his performance billed as 'The farewell performance from Roger Chapman & The Shortlist'.

== Discography ==
=== Streetwalkers ===
==== Albums ====
- Streetwalkers, Reprise K 54017 (1974)
- Downtown Flyers, Vertigo 6360 123, Mercury LP SRM-1-1060 (US) (1975)
- Red Card, Vertigo 9102 010, Mercury SMR-1-1083 (US), Repertoire REP 47-WP (CD) (1976)
- Vicious But Fair, Vertigo 9102 012, Mercury LP SRM-1-1135 (US) (1977)
- Streetwalkers Live, Vertigo 6641-703 (1977)
- Best of Streetwalkers CD, CA, LP Vertigo 846-661 (1990)
- BBC Radio One Live, CD Windsong (1995)

==== Singles ====
- "Roxianna" b/w "The Crack", Reprise K 14357 (1974) – released as Chapman Whitney Streetwalkers
- "Raingame" b/w "Miller", Vertigo 6059 130 (1975)
- "Daddy Rolling Stone" b/w "Hole in Your Pocket", Vertigo 6059 144 (1976)
- "Chilli Con Carne" b/w "But You're Beautiful", Vertigo 6059 169 (1977)

=== Solo ===
==== Albums ====
- Chappo (1979)
- Live in Hamburg (1979)
- Mail Order Magic (1980)
- Hyenas Only Laugh For Fun (1981)
- The Riffburglar Album (Funny Cider Sessions) (1982)
- He Was... She Was... You Was... We Was... (Double, Live) (1982)
- Swag (as the Riffburglars) (1983)
- Mango Crazy (1983)
- The Shadow Knows (1984)
- Zipper (1986)
- Techno Prisoners (1987)
- Live in Berlin (1989)
- Walking The Cat (1989)
- Strong Songs – The Best Of ... (1990)
- Hybrid and Lowdown (1990)
- Kick It Back (UK compilation) (1990)
- Under No Obligation (1992)
- King of the Shouters (1994)
- Kiss My Soul (1996)
- A Turn Unstoned? (1998)
- Anthology 1979–98 (1998)
- In My Own Time (live) (1999)
- Rollin' & Tumblin (live) Mystic (2001)
- Chappo-The Loft Tapes, Volume 1: Manchester University 10.3.1979, Mystic (2006)
- Chappo-The Loft Tapes, Volume 2: Rostock 1983, Mystic (2006)
- Chappo-The Loft Tapes, Volume 3: London Dingwalls 15 April 1996, Mystic (2006)
- Chappo-The Loft Tapes, Volume 4: Live at Unca Po's Hamburg 5.3.1982, Mystic (2006)
- One More Time For Peace, Mystic (2007)
- Hide Go Seek, Hypertension Records (2009)
- First Cut: Chapman-Whitney Streetwalkers, digital rerelease, Mystic Records (2010)
- Live at Rockpalast Markthalle Hamburg 1979 (2014)
- Live at Grugahalle Essen 1981 (2014)
- Maybe the last time (live 2012)
- Life in the Pond (2021)

==== Singles ====
- "Imbecile" (1979), Mike Batt with Roger Chapman. From the album Tarot Suite.
- "Shadow on the Wall" (1983), Mike Oldfield with Roger Chapman
- "How How How" (1984)

== DVDs ==
- At Rockpalast Wienerworld (2004)
- Family & Friends Angel Air (2003)
