= Best of Vanilla Fudge =

Greatest hits album by Vanilla Fudge
- Released: 1982
- Genre: Psychedelic rock
- Label: Atco
- Producer: Shadow Morton, Vanilla Fudge, Adrian Barber

Vanilla Fudge chronology
Rock & Roll (1969)	Best of Vanilla Fudge (1982)	Mystery (1984)

Professional ratings
Review scores
Source	Rating
Allmusic	4.5/5 stars

Best of Vanilla Fudge is a best-of album by the American psychedelic rock band Vanilla Fudge. It was released by Atco Records in 1982.

== Track listing ==
=== Side 1 ===
1. "Illusions of My Childhood (Part One)" (from Vanilla Fudge)
2. "You Keep Me Hanging On" (from Vanilla Fudge)
3. "Illusions of My Childhood (Part Two)" (from Vanilla Fudge)
4. "Shotgun" (from Near the Beginning)
5. "Some Velvet Morning" (from Near the Beginning)

=== Side 2 ===
1. "Ticket to Ride" (from Vanilla Fudge)
2. "Take Me for a Little While" (from Vanilla Fudge)
3. "Illusions of My Childhood (Part Three)" (from Vanilla Fudge)
4. "Where Is My Mind" (from Atco single 6554)
5. "Season of the Witch" (from Renaissance)

The album is currently out of print.
