= The Age of Atlantic =

Compilation album by various artists
- Released: 1970
- Genre: Rock
- Label: Atlantic 2464 013
- Producer: Various

Series chronology
Atco Blockbusters (1969)	The Age of Atlantic (1970)	The New Age of Atlantic (1972)

The Age of Atlantic is the second in a series of rock music samplers released by the Atlantic label in the UK. The compilation is credited to Janet Martin. Issued at a budget price of UK £0.99, the album was for many an inexpensive introduction to new rock acts and was one of the earliest samplers of "progressive" or "underground" music.

The gatefold's front was a photo of a display modelled in plasticine showing the logos or punning representations of the featured bands, the album covers being depicted on the interior. The back features a photo of the track listing scratched into a flattened layer of plasticine. The design is credited to Hamish & Gustav.

== Track listing ==
=== Side One ===
1. "Comin' Home" (Bramlett/Clapton) - Delaney & Bonnie (with Eric Clapton)
2. "Tonight" (MC5) - MC5
3. "Black Hearted Woman" (Allman) - Allman Brothers Band
4. "Survival" (Anderson) - Yes
5. "I'm a Good Woman" (Ozen) - Cold Blood
6. "Whole Lotta Love" (Page/Plant/Jones/Bonham) - Led Zeppelin

=== Side Two ===
1. "Termination" (Brann/Dorman) - Iron Butterfly
2. "The Last Time" (Jagger/Richards) - Dada
3. "Communication Breakdown" (Page/Plant/Jones/Bonham) - Led Zeppelin
4. "Wash Mama Wash" (Rebennack) - Dr John
5. "Need Love" (Stein/Bogert/Martell/Appice) - Vanilla Fudge
6. "Broken Arrow" (Young) - Buffalo Springfield
