= Paul Hanson (guitarist) =

American guitarist

Paul Hanson (born January 17, 1957) is an American guitarist. He started playing guitar at the age of 8. He formed bands in his hometown of Seattle, Washington, most notably Krakatoa, Silverload and Max. He is best known for his instructional series of books, CDs and videos.

2008

== 1980s ==
Hanson moved to Los Angeles in 1980 and attended GIT (part of Musicians Institute) in Hollywood, California. After graduating he joined the Brooklyn Brats, a popular band in the Hollywood club circuit.

Hanson began working at Musicians Institute and taught a performance class with Tim Bogert the legendary bassist who was also a teacher at MI. In 1984 he created an instructional audio tape series called "Hard Rock Solos for Guitar" on REH Publishing. It was hugely successful and advertised with full page ads in the guitar magazines for years.

In 1986 Hanson was asked to tour with Tim Bogert's band The Vanilla Fudge along with Carmine Appice and Mark Stein. During the tour, an album entitled "The Best of Vanilla Fudge Live" was recorded at the Hollywood Palace and released on Rhino Records.

Hanson was featured in a guitar instructional video directed by Don Mock called Metal and Rock Improvising (Video, REH). He then toured as lead guitarist on Andy Taylor's Thunder World tour and appeared on the music video of "Don’t Let me Die Young". On the Japanese leg of the tour, a concert at NHK Hall in Tokyo was recorded and broadcast live in Japan.

In Hollywood, Hanson became a notable guitar coach teaching actors George Clooney, Michael J. Fox, Eric Stoltz, Mitch Pileggi (X-files), María Conchita Alonso and Charlotte Ross. Hanson had a small role as one of the "Pinheads" in the film Back to the Future.

In 1988 Hanson signed with MGI records in Germany and recorded his first solo album The Visitor. He also became a clinician for Ampeg, Crate and Westone guitars and toured the US doing guitar clinics. His neighbor in LA was a retired music fan of the Big Band era, and Hanson became fascinated with music from the 1930s and 1940s and began working on an album of big band music played with heavy metal guitar.

== 1990s and 2000s ==
In 1990 Hanson served as the head of the Rock Department at American Institute of Music in Vienna, Austria. During this time he finished his second solo album The Paul Hanson Orchestra, all big band standards with metal guitar now available on iTunes from Across The Sound Music. He met the German bass player Ralf Meyer. They played together a show on MTV Hungary.

Hanson returned to the US in 1992 and taught at Musicians Institute and recorded jingles and music for film. A good example of his music "Conquest of Truth" can be heard on the main menu of the first The Matrix DVD. In addition, he has composed numerous music cues for TV and movie trailers including recent releases, The Fantastic Four and Talladega Nights: The Ballad of Ricky Bobby.

In the mid 1990s Hanson wrote the best-selling guitar instructional book and CD set Shred Guitar published by Warner Bros., and now available from Alfred Publishing. He also created Arpeggios for Lead Guitar (Video, Hal Leonard). In 1999 he started working for Roland and Boss giving music clinics.

== 2000 and later ==
Relocating back to his home state of Washington he released his third solo album entitled Rain Dancer featuring all acoustic instrumentation.

As Product and Marketing Specialist for Boss U.S., in 2006 Hanson began producing and hosting a guitar talk radio podcast called Boss Tone Radio. Guests so far include Paul Gilbert, Frank Gambale, Marty Friedman, Steve Stevens, Rusty Anderson (Paul McCartney's band), Scott Henderson, Will Ray, Oz Noy, Michael Ward, Dave Navarro, Jeff Baxter and many others.

Hanson is also responsible for the "Pedals That Make the Tone" feature in Guitar World magazine and can be seen at http://www.BossUS.com/tone replicating the tones of the featured song transcriptions each month in the magazine.

In 2010 Hanson started a guitar lessons website called www.ShredGuitarOnline.com as a companion to his book Shred Guitar.
