= Steph Honde =

French musician

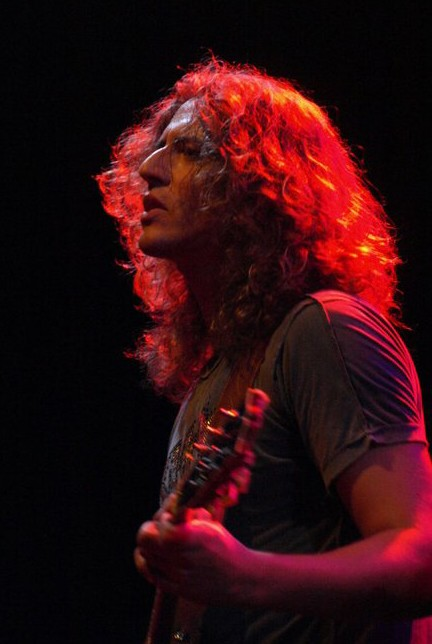

Background information
- Born: Stéphane Alexander Andre Honde; 5 September 1975 (age 50); Manosque, France
- Genres: hard rock, progressive rock, heavy metal
- Occupations: Singer-Songwriter, Musician, Movie Soundtrack Artist, Sketch Artist, Wine Sommelier, Holistic Practitioner
- Instruments: Vocals, Guitar, Piano, Bass Guitar
- Years active: 2003–Present
- Labels: Mausoleum Records, Rock N Growl Records, Universal Music, Artie Dillon, Vallis Lupi Productions
- Website: facebook.com/HollywoodMonsters

Steph Honde (born Stéphane Honde; 5 September 1975) is a French singer, songwriter and multi-instrumentalist (vocals, guitar, piano, bass guitar). Honde is most famous for being the frontman and songwriter of the American hard rock supergroup, Hollywood Monsters which he founded in 2013. Before Hollywood Monsters, Honde was the guitarist of the French rock band Café Bertrand from 2004 to 2010, when he resigned from the band and joined Paul Di'Anno band as the guitarist on tour across France.

== Early life ==
Steph Honde's love for music developed in his early years. His first musical instrument was the drums and later he started to play guitar in order to achieve his goal to become a songwriter. Honde started his music career as the frontman with the French band Mamooth.

== Music career ==
=== Café Bertrand ===
Honde achieved great success in France as a guitarist. He garnered a well-deserved reputation as a guitar virtuoso when playing in the French hard rock band Café Bertrand in 2004–2010. In 2006 Café Bertrand was chosen to be the opening band for the Deep Purple European leg of the Rapture of the Deep tour which included 36 dates across Europe in October and November 2006 and another 12 dates in France in March 2007. Café Bertrand played at giant stadiums such as Stade de France, with an audience capacity in excess of 80,000. In 2009 Café Bertrand was the support band for two AC/DC shows in France during the Black Ice World Tour: on 9 June 2009 at Stade Vélodrome in Marseille and on 12 June 2009 at Stade de France in Paris. In July 2009 Café Bertrand played at the Montreux Jazz Festival. Honde left Café Bertrand in 2010.

=== Paul Di'Anno and The Stars ===
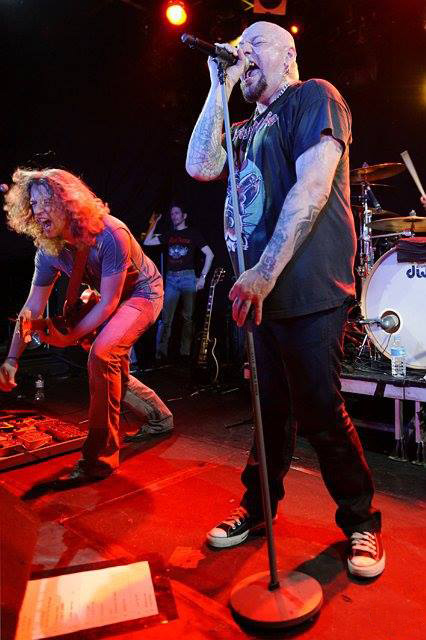
Steph Honde and Paul Di'Anno live in 2010

In 2010, after leaving the band Café Bertrand, Steph Honde toured with Paul Di'Anno (the original vocalist of Iron Maiden) and The Stars across France. Later in 2014, Di'Anno made a guest appearance on the album Big Trouble by Hollywood Monsters on bonus track "Fuck You All". Di'Anno chose the song himself from the number of songs suggested to him by Steph Honde.

=== Hollywood Monsters ===
In 2012 Steph Honde emigrated to California, U.S. and started working on his own project, the band Hollywood Monsters which features guest musicians. Steph Honde created the project in 2013 and is the only songwriter of the project, including the band's debut album Big Trouble. The band members are: Steph Honde (vocals, guitars), Don Airey (keyboards) (Deep Purple, previously played in Whitesnake, Gary Moore, Ozzy Osbourne, Michael Schenker Group and others), Vinny Appice (drums) (previously played in DIO, Black Sabbath, Heaven & Hell, Kill Devil Hill and others), Tim Bogert (bass) (previously played in Vanilla Fudge, Cactus, and Beck, Bogert & Appice).

Steph Honde met Don Airey in 2006 when Honde's then-current band Café Bertrand was the opening band for the Deep Purple European leg of the Rapture of the Deep tour. Tim Bogert appreciated the demo recordings suggested to him by Steph Honde and agreed to play on three tracks of the album despite the fact he had been in retirement for several years prior to the recording of the album Big Trouble. Vinny Appice plays drums on most of the tracks on the album. Steph Honde wrote the song "Village Of The Damned" as an homage to Vinny Appice before even meeting him.

== Style and Influences ==
The music genre of Steph Honde is commonly referred to as hard rock reminiscent of the 1970s, yet his songwriting was also inspired by progressive rock and heavy metal. Honde listed among his influences Iron Maiden, along with Pink Floyd, Frank Zappa, The Who, Deep Purple, Marillion, Led Zeppelin.

Steph Honde's vocals and guitar playing style have become a distinctive feature of Hollywood Monsters. In his songs Honde fuses elements of hard rock, progressive rock and metal, and employs different arranging techniques (e.g. use of classical instruments in the song "The Ocean" from Hollywood Monsters' album Big Trouble).

== Guest Appearances & Special Projects ==
- In February 2015 Steph Honde made a guest appearance as a guitarist on the song "Ole Blood & Guts" (in memory of general George S. Patton) by the American metal band Age of Liberty. The song also features Darren Crisp on vocals, Tony Franklin on bass and Vinny Appice on drums.
- Honde also appeared on the single Streets of Anger by AraPacis on their album System Deceive in 2015, and on the single Translucidity by AraPacis from their album Obsolete Continuum in 2017. The song also features Vinny Appice on drums. He also appears on the same band's song Paradox of Denial from the 2019 album with the same title.
- In April 2019, Honde collaborated with Micki Milosevic under the band name of "Unprotected Innocence" creating an approved cover of a Spanish version of "Rock You Like a Hurricane" by the hard rock band Scorpions for the opening scene and soundtrack CD of the 2019 movie Hellboy, elevating Honde as an instrumental and vocal soundtrack artist.

== Discography ==
=== Café Bertrand ===
- Les Airs Empruntés (2005)
- L'Art délicat du Rock'N'Roll (2008). (He was the sole songwriter of the latter. Both albums were critically acclaimed and commercially successful.)

=== Hollywood Monsters 2013-2019 ===
- Big Trouble (released in 2014 on Mausoleum Records and is being promoted by Rock N Growl Records. The release dates are: 23 May 2014 in the U.S., 8 July 2014 rest of the world (except Canada), 14 October 2014 in Canada (under the Universal Music label). The album Big Trouble features 10 tracks and a bonus track, all of which were written by Steph Honde.)
- Capture the Sun (2016)
- Thriving on Chaos (2019)

Steph's Solo

- Steph Honde "Covering The Monsters" (2017, released only in Brazil )

=== Jim Crean 2019 ===
- The London Fog (Steph plays Guitars, Keyboards and bass)
- Greatest Hits (Steph plays guitar and keyboard in the song "Scream Taker" and "Conflicted", featuring Vinny Appice on drums and Rudy Sarzo on bass)

=== HellBoy Soundtrack 2019 ===
Steph Honde and Micki Milosevic under band name: Unprotected Innocence

- Rock You Like a Hurricane (Scorpions Cover/Spanish Version) Sony Music Entertainment

=== NoN (Formally "Now or Never") 2020 ===
- In 2019, Steph joined the Swiss Rock Band NoN, which was founded in 2012 by guitarist Ricky Marx (ex-Pretty Maids) and initial bass player Kenn Jackson (also ex-Pretty Maids) along with Swiss drummer Ranzo (Sultan), and newest addition Claudio Nasuti, Italian Bassist. As the new front man, in the Spring of 2019 he finished recording powerhouse vocals for the III album released in 2020. Despite having received numerous well-favored reviews, the band had to cancel or postpone all live venues due to the Pandemic Outbreak which eventually led to Steph's departure from the band.

=== Sunroad 2021 ===
- In 2021, after the pandemic annihilated most live music venues, Steph continued to collaborate with Fred Mika, the leader of the Brazilian Rock Band Sunroad. The two had conceived "Walking The Hemispheres" the ninth studio album from Sunroad featuring Vinny Appice and Don Airey) on several songs. Steph's Coverdale style vocals and Mika's ideas blended a mix of classic hard rock groups such Deep Purple, Whitesnake and U.F.O. with a touch of Brazilian groove. Mika wrote all the lyrics and explains that the isolation time was an experience for him whereas Steph reflected hiw own experience through the heartfelt lyrics. The title track is about the earth's hemispheres.

=== Frédéric Slama’s AOR 2021-2022 ===
- For Steph, the year 2021 continued to be a busy year for musical networking. He joined forces with AOR Frederic Slama with the result in the cover album 'L.A. Suspicion' (2022) which features major artists of the eighties. The album was covered and collaborated by Steph along with other lead & backing Vocals: Steve Overland, Paul Sabu, Robbie Lablanc, Bill Kelly, Markus Nordenberg, and Michael Stosic while Frédéric Slama & Tommy Denander covered the instrumental arrangements.

=== Scream Taker 2021-2022 ===
- As the Covid pandemic neared its end, Steph continued to work with Buffalo Music Hall of Fame vocalist Jim Crean and legendary drummer Vinny Appice (Dio, Black Sabbath), each recording music from their home studios. The trio had brainstormed and shared their ideas with each other until eventually a classic hard rock album 'Kill the Breautiful' was conceived and then released on September 30, 2022, featuring the hit tracks “Stone Cold” and “Shattered Mirror”.

=== Alpha Mountain 2022 ===
- Also in 2022, Steph united with his French counterparts, creating the supergroup Alpha Mountain. The first album 'All in Vain' showcases 11 tracks echoing the sounds of Deep Purple, Pink Floyd, Dio, Thunder, and Joe Walsh. Along with Butcho Vukovic (Watcha, Last Temptation), drummer Eric Lebailly (Adagio, Louis Bertgnac), and bassists Pascal Baron (Sloane Square Band) and Fred Schneider (Lag I Run, Adrian Byron Burns) the album is due to release September 2022 via Vallis Lupi Productions.

== See also ==
- Steph Honde interview at Metal-temple.com by Jeff Legg, 21 June 2014.
- Stephane Honde (Hollywood Monsters) interview on Rock Overdose: "I took a chance on doing something a little bit different from what we hear these days".| at Rockoverdose.gr by Michael Spiggos, 10 June 2014.
- Steph Honde interview at Neoprog.eu by Togo Chubb, 23 August 2014.
- Steph Honde interview at Via Nocturna by Pedro Carvalho, 11 June 2014.
- Steph Honde interview at Arte Metal by Victor Hugo Franceschini, 12 December 2014.
- Official press release by the record label Mausoleum Records
- Video of the song "Ole Blood & Guts" by Age of Liberty on Youtube. The video features Steph Honde on guitars.
- Movie Kill The Nazi at Action-Prod company website: teaser, plot, crew.
- Lageat, Philippe, Brelet, Baptiste (2014). AC/DC Tours De France 1976-2014. Éditions Point Barre. p. 712. ISBN 978-2-7466-7071-6. - The book features Café Bertrand as support band in 2009.
- AC/DC Tours De France - book overview on Youtube by the authors. The book features Café Bertrand as support band in 2009.
- Hollywood Monsters – Big Trouble. Album review by G.W. Hill at Music Street Journal, 29 September 2014.
- Hollywood Monsters – Big Trouble. Album review by Jeb Wright at classicrockrevisited.com 29 September 2014.
- Hollywood Monsters: Big Trouble. Album review by Craig Hartranft at Dangerdog Music Reviews, 14 May 2014.
- Chronique de Big Trouble. Album review by Togo Chubb at Neoprog, 23 June 2014.
- Hollywood Monsters – Big Trouble. Album review by Oshyrya at metalchroniques.fr 1 June 2014.
