= Hyades =

Hyades may refer to:

- Hyades (band)
- Hyades (mythology)
- Hyades (star cluster), an open star cluster in the constellation Taurus
