= Psychedelic Sundae – The Best of Vanilla Fudge =

Greatest hits album by Vanilla Fudge
- Released: 1993
- Genre: Psychedelic rock
- Label: Rhino
- Producer: David McLees, Bill Inglot

Vanilla Fudge chronology
| The Best of Vanilla Fudge – Live (1991) | Psychedelic Sundae – The Best of Vanilla Fudge (1993) | The Return / Then And Now (2002) |

Professional ratings
Review scores
| Source | Rating |
|---|---|
| Allmusic | 4.5/5 stars |

Psychedelic Sundae – The Best of Vanilla Fudge is a best-of album by the American psychedelic rock band Vanilla Fudge. It was released by Rhino Records in 1993 and featured songs from their first five albums. It also featured various singles and non-album tracks.

== Track listing ==
1. "You Keep Me Hangin' On" (single version)
2. "Where Is My Mind" (non-LP single)
3. "The Look of Love" (B-side of "Where Is My Mind")
4. "Ticket to Ride" (previously unissued single mix)
5. "Come by Day, Come by Night" (non-LP B-side of "You Keep Me Hangin' On")*
6. "Take Me for a Little While" (single remix)
7. "That's What Makes a Man" (from the album Renaissance)
8. "Season of the Witch" (from the album Renaissance)
9. "Shotgun" (single version)
10. "Thoughts" (B-side of "Take Me for a Little While")
11. "Faceless People" (from the album Renaissance)*
12. "Good Good Lovin'" (non-LP B-side of "Shotgun")
13. "Some Velvet Morning" (from the album Near the Beginning)
14. "I Can't Make It Alone" (B-side of "Need Love")
15. "Lord in the Country" (single version)
16. "Need Love" (from the album Rock & Roll)
17. "Street Walking Woman" (from the album Rock & Roll)*
18. "All in Your Mind" (previously unreleased)*

[*] only available as bonus track on CD
