= Another Step (Closer to You) =

Single by Kim Wilde and Junior

from the album Another Step
- B-side: "Hold Back" (Kim Wilde solo)
- Released: 16 March 1987
- Recorded: 1986
- Genre: Synth-rock; pop
- Length: 3:23 (album version); 3:33 (7-inch version)
- Label: MCA
- Songwriters: Kim Wilde; Steve Byrd
- Producer: Ricki Wilde

Kim Wilde singles chronology
"You Keep Me Hangin' On" (1986)	"Another Step (Closer to You)" (1987)	"Say You Really Want Me" (1987)

Music video
- "Another Step (Closer to You)" on YouTube

"Another Step (Closer to You)" is a song from the Kim Wilde album Another Step, performed as a duet with Junior Giscombe. It was released as the third single from the album.

Wilde co-wrote the song with Steve Byrd, who originally sang the male part on the demo. However, they decided the vocals would be better suited to someone with a more soulful voice and chose Giscombe. "Another Step" was not originally intended for release as a single; however, when trying to follow up "You Keep Me Hangin' On", producer Ricki Wilde decided that it was the best selection from the album, but needed remixing first. He kept the original vocals and a couple of the overdubs, but completely re-recorded the rest of the song.

It became another top 10 hit for Wilde in the UK, peaking at No. 6, as well as the same ranking in Ireland, where it also reached No. 6 on the Irish charts

== Charts ==
Chart (1987)	Peak position
Australia (Kent Music Report)	88
Luxembourg (Radio Luxembourg)	5
Netherlands (Single Top 100)	95
UK Singles (OCC)	6
Irish Singles Chart	6
