= Another Step =

Studio album by Kim Wilde
- Released: 3 November 1986
- Recorded: 1985–1986
- Studios: Select Sound (Knebworth, England); Westlake (Los Angeles); Larrabee (West Hollywood)
- Genre: Pop
- Length: 52:07
- Label: MCA
- Producers: Ricky Wilde; Richard James Burgess; Reinhold Heil; Richard Rudolph; Rod Temperton; Bruce Swedien; Kim Wilde

Kim Wilde chronology
Teases & Dares (1984)	Another Step (1986)	Close (1988)

Singles from Another Step
- 1. "Schoolgirl" Released: 8 June 1986; 2. "Say You Really Want Me" Released: 1 July 1986; 3. "You Keep Me Hangin' On" Released: 19 September 1986; 4. "Another Step (Closer to You)" Released: 16 March 1987

Alternative cover
- North American cover

Professional ratings
Review scores
Source	Rating
AllMusic	2/5 stars
Record Mirror	3/5 stars
Sounds	2.5/5 stars

Another Step is the fifth studio album by the English pop singer Kim Wilde, released on 3 November 1986 by MCA Records. The album contained her comeback worldwide hit "You Keep Me Hangin' On", which reached No. 1 in the US, as well as the UK top 10 hit "Another Step (Closer to You)" and "Say You Really Want Me".

== Overview ==
The album contained 12 tracks (13 on the CD and cassette) and a varied team of songwriters, as well as Wilde herself co-writing more than half of the tracks. The first half was uptempo, whereas the second consisted of ballads. Most of the tracks were produced by Ricky Wilde, but there were also production duties fulfilled by Rod Temperton and Bruce Swedien known for working with Michael Jackson and there were also Reinhold Heil, Richard James Burgess and Dick Rudolph.

The album's first single was "Schoolgirl", which was released only in Australia and several European countries (although not the UK). This single was the first Kim Wilde had co-written herself. The first single released globally was a cover version of the Supremes hit "You Keep Me Hangin' On". In the United States it became Wilde's first number one on the Billboard Hot 100 chart, in the summer of 1987. It also reached No. 1 in Canada and Australia, and was almost equally successful in the UK, where it peaked at no. 2.

The next single was "Another Step (Closer to You)", a duet with English R&B singer Junior Giscombe, which went to top 10 in the UK. The third globally and final single off the album was "Say You Really Want Me", which caused a minor controversy when the video was banned from children's programming because it showed Kim writhing on a bed having fun with a pearl necklace. Despite the raunchy image and publicity which accompanied the specially-remixed song, it didn't set the charts alight and the album saw no further single releases. The album reached US No. 40, her only album to do better in America than in the UK, where it only hit No. 88 on the first release. Elsewhere, the album was a massive success in Norway, where it hit No. 2, and in Canada, where it hit No. 11, and selling Gold.

All of the tracks on Another Step were a departure from the synth-pop sound of the previous studio albums. There were more guitars than before: "The Thrill of It" and "I've Got So Much Love" had a distinctive 'rock' feel. The final five songs were ballads, the most noteworthy being Kim's self-penned and produced "Don't Say Nothing's Changed" which closed the album.

A re-package of this album was released a few months after the initial launch, with a new sleeve design and the addition of bonus tracks, and this time the album made it to number 73 on the UK Albums Chart. Although this failed to reignite interest, it has since become a collector's item for fans.

Kim Wilde cemented her reputation as a singles artist with this album, as again overall sales were disappointing despite the huge success of the songs released from it. She has since voiced her regret that she did not put more effort into cracking the US market after she had scored her first number one hit there.

== Critical response ==
Writing for Melody Maker, Caroline Sullivan called Another Step "her best LP ever" and praised Wilde for embracing her camp appeal. Comparing "Missing" to the work of Kathy Kirby, Sullivan elaborated; "side two in its entirity [sic] could have been airlifted directly from 1962, when a song was a song and, as such, afforded properly melodramatic treatment." More praise was reserved for the "tenderness and poignancy" in her voice, a quality the reviewer compared to that of Marie Osmond. A second review for Melody Maker (this time by Mick Mercer) was less positive, describing her "small voice and very limited range" as "hopelessly unconvincing when approaching anything remotely resembling balladeering territory". The Age praised "You Keep Me Hangin' On" and "Hit Him" but found the rest of the first half of the album to be "quite undistinguishable." Side two was described as "much more appealing", with the self-written and jazz-influenced "Don't Say Nothing's Changed" singled out for praise along with the preceding "How Do You Want My Love". Northamptonshire Evening Telegraph found Wilde's vocals "attractive rather than arresting" and singled out "I've Got So Much Love" as a Sheena Easton-style soaring ballad. A reviewer for the Manchester Evening News unfavorably compared "I've Got So Much Love" to the work of Pat Benatar but found the "sugary soul" of tracks like "She Hasn't Got Time for You" and "Brothers" slightly more pleasing. Despite comparing Wilde's bared midriff on the front cover to Madonna and noting the influence of Michael Jackson in "The Thrill of It", Smash Hits found the sound on the album to be "firmly entrenched in her old "Kids in America" style" and described "You Keep Me Hangin' On" as a "brutal massacre of the old Supremes classic". A short review in Just Seventeen described the singer as "The girl who was Madonna before Madonna ever thought about making records". Q described the first track as "a remarkably drab version" and said of the sound of the record – "if you've followed her career to date you've practically heard this album already -bassy synths, crunching guitars and the rebel-by-numbers yell you'd expect to hear emanating from a leather clad blonde."

== Track listing ==
Side one

1. "You Keep Me Hangin' On" (Holland-Dozier-Holland) – 4:10
2. "Hit Him" (O.S. Blandamer) – 3:32
3. "Another Step (Closer to You)" (Kim Wilde, Steve Byrd) – 3:18
4. "The Thrill of It" (Kim Wilde, Steve Byrd) – 3:51
5. "I've Got So Much Love" (Kim Wilde, Marty Wilde, Ricky Wilde) – 2:55
6. "Victim" (Kim Wilde, Marty Wilde, Ricky Wilde) – 4:01
7. "Schoolgirl" (Kim Wilde, Marty Wilde, Ricky Wilde) – 3:35

Side two

1. "Say You Really Want Me" (Danny Sembello, Donnell Spencer, Jr., Richard Rudolph) – 3:40
2. "She Hasn't Got Time for You" (Kim Wilde, Marty Wilde, Ricky Wilde) – 4:12
3. "Brothers" (Marty Wilde, Ricky Wilde) – 4:44
4. "Missing" (Kim Wilde, Steve Byrd) – 4:23
5. "How Do You Want My Love" (Kim Wilde, Ricky Wilde) – 3:53
6. "Don't Say Nothing's Changed" (Kim Wilde) – 3:53
- "Victim" only included on the Cassette and Compact disc versions

Bonus tracks (2010 remastered CD edition)

14. "Songs About Love" (Kim Wilde) ("Schoolgirl" B-side) – 4:55
15. "Loving You" (Kim Wilde, Ricky Wilde) ("You Keep Me Hangin' On" B-side) – 4:56
16. "Hold Back" (Ricky Wilde, Marty Wilde) ("Another Step (Closer to You)" B-side) – 3:58
17. "Another Step (Closer to You)" (7" version) – 3:30
18. "Say You Really Want Me" (7" version) – 4:03

Bonus CD (2010 remastered CD edition)

1. "Schoolgirl" (Head Master Mix) – 6:33
2. "You Keep Me Hangin' On" (W.C.H Club Mix) – 6:27
3. "You Keep Me Hangin' On" (W.C.H Mix) – 9:06
4. "Another Step (Closer To You)" (Extended Mix) – 5:53
5. "Say You Really Want Me" (Extended Version) – 6:34
6. "Say You Really Want Me" (The Video Remix) – 9:47
7. "Say You Really Want Me" (David Todd Remix) – 5:44
8. "Say You Really Want Me" (Radio Edit) – 5:09
9. "Say You Really Want Me" (Instrumental) – 4:22
10. "Say You Really Want Me" (7" US Version) – 3:30
11. "Say You Really Want Me" (7" Promo/North American Album Version) (Incorrectly labelled as Urban Version) – 3:57
12. "Megamix" (You Keep Me Hangin' On / Another Step (Closer to You) / Say You Really Want Me) – 8:05

== Personnel ==
- Kim Wilde – lead and backing vocals, synthesizers (11), drum programming (11)
- Ricky Wilde – synthesizers (1–5, 7, 9, 10, 11, 13), Fairlight III programming (1–5, 7, 9, 10, 11, 13), backing vocals (2, 9), guitars (10)
- Paul Fox – synthesizers (6, 12), synthesizer programming (6, 12), additional arrangements (6, 12)
- Reinhold Heil – keyboards (7), Fairlight III programming (7)
- Danny Sembello – keyboards (8), arrangements (8)
- Guy Fletcher – keyboards (10), synthesizers (10)
- Steve Byrd – guitars (1–7, 9, 11, 13), backing vocals (2)
- Gary Twigg – bass (3, 4, 5, 9, 10, 11, 13)
- Matt Letley – drums (3, 4, 5, 9, 11, 13)
- Richard James Burgess – drums (6, 12), drum programming (6, 12), percussion (6, 12)
- Pete Schweir – drum programming (11)
- Simon Clarke – alto saxophone (2), baritone saxophone (2)
- Tim Sanders – tenor saxophone (2)
- Roddy Lorimer – trumpet (2)
- The Kick Horns – horn arrangements (2)
- Oscar Blandamer – horn arrangements (2)
- Junior Giscombe – guest vocals (3)
- Don Haywoode – backing vocals (7)
- Emma Haywoode – backing vocals (7)
- Lisa Fischer – backing vocals (12)
- Paulette McWilliams – backing vocals (12)
- Myrna Smith-Schilling – backing vocals (12)

== Production ==
- Ricky Wilde – producer (1–5, 7, 9, 10, 11, 13), remixing (5)
- Richard James Burgess – producer (6, 12)
- Reinhold Heil – producer (7)
- Richard Rudolph – producer (8)
- Bruce Swedien – producer (8), recording (8), mixing (8)
- Rod Temperton – producer (8)
- Kim Wilde – producer (11)
- Pete Schweir – engineer (1–5, 7, 9, 10, 11, 13)
- Frank Roszak – engineer (6, 12)
- Phill Brown – remixing (6)
- Simon Marsh – art direction, design, photography
- Jeff Adamoff – art direction (CD)
- Dick Bouchard – artwork and design (CD)
- Jeff Lancaster – artwork and design (CD)

== Charts ==
=== Weekly charts ===
Chart (1986–1987)	Peak position
Australia (Kent Music Report)	31
Canada Top Albums/CDs (RPM)	12
Dutch Albums (Album Top 100)	70
European Albums (Music & Media)	49
German Albums (Offizielle Top 100)	41
Norwegian Albums (VG-lista)	2
Swedish Albums (Sverigetopplistan)	49
Swiss Albums (Schweizer Hitparade)	5
UK Albums (Official Charts)	73
US Billboard 200	40

=== Year-end charts ===
Chart (1987)	Position
Canada Top Albums/CDs (RPM)	48

== Certifications and sales ==
Region	Certification	Certified units/sales
Canada (Music Canada)	Gold	50,000^{^}
Norway (IFPI Norway)	Gold	50,000
Switzerland (IFPI Switzerland)	Gold	25,000^{^}
^{^} Shipments figures based on certification alone.
