= Pete Bremy =

American rock bass player

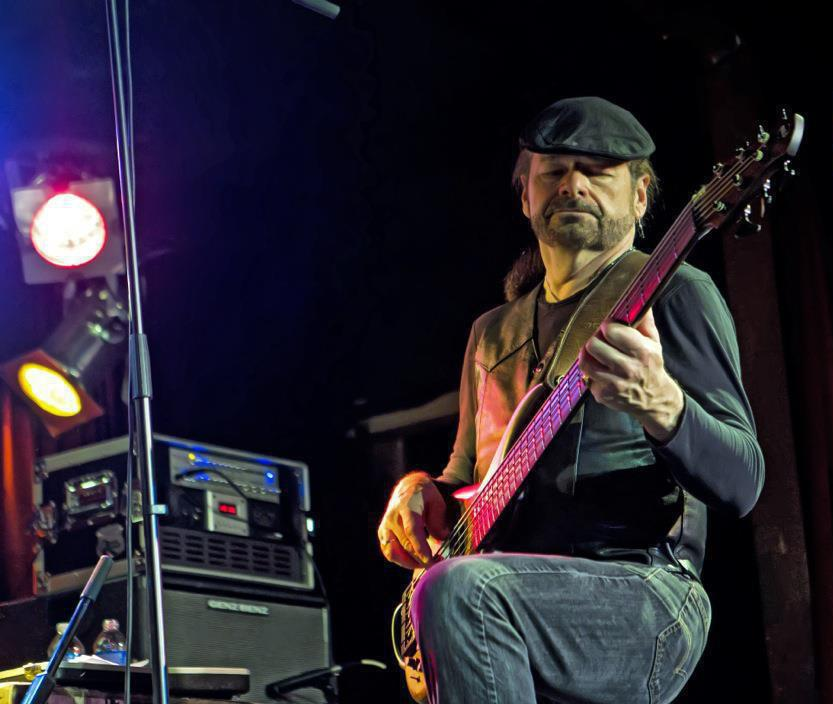

Background information
- Birth name: Peter Edward Bremy
- Born: October 15, 1952 (age 72); Paterson, New Jersey, U.S.
- Genres: Hard rock, psychedelic rock, blues rock, country, folk
- Occupation: Musician
- Instrument(s): Bass, keyboards, vocals
- Years active: 1969–present
- Website: petebremy.com

Pete Bremy (born October 15, 1952) is an American rock bass player. He is best known for his associations with Vanilla Fudge and Cactus.

== Biography ==
Originally from Paterson, Bremy is a lifelong resident of New Jersey. He started singing at a very early age, and when his mother's friend, opera singer Lupe Landin, heard him sing she encouraged his mother to provide him with music lessons. He played music on and off through school. He got serious about music when he, as so many others, heard the Beatles. Ringo Starr inspired him to play drums and Bremy became a drummer for some local garage bands. He also took up bass in his early teens, inspired by Paul McCartney and Vanilla Fudge bassist, Tim Bogert. He received formal music training at William Paterson University. Here he met jazz great Thad Jones from whom he received more training.

Bremy spent most of his career as a local New Jersey musician, but got a break in 1997 when he met original Vanilla Fudge lead guitarist Vince Martell and in 1999 was recruited for the Vince Martell band where he has been a member ever since.

In January 2002, as Vanilla Fudge was set to embark on tour, Fudge bassist Tim Bogert suddenly became ill and Bremy was called to sub for him on less than 24 hours' notice. As Bogert remained ill for many months, Bremy continued to tour with Vanilla Fudge for most of the year.

In 2004, Bremy toured with singer/songwriter Essra Mohawk. Her album Primordial Lovers was rated by Rolling Stone as one of the top 25 albums of all time. He toured again with Mohawk in 2005.

In 2008, Tim Bogert once again became ill and Bremy substituted for him once again, but this time it was with Cactus.

In 2010, Bremy became a member of Vanilla Fudge when Bogert retired. The next year, a reunited Cactus, which is the band Vanilla Fudge drummer Carmine Appice and bassist Tim Bogert formed after Vanilla Fudge broke up in 1970, also featured Bremy. Bremy is the only non-original member that played in both bands. Cactus released Black Dawn, its first studio album in ten years in 2016. In 2016, after five years in the band touring the USA, Europe and Japan, Bremy, along with original guitarist Jim McCarty, left Cactus.

Vanilla Fudge released its first studio album in ten years also in 2015, Spirit of '67 with Bremy on bass and background vocals. Vanilla Fudge is still touring.

Since 2000, Bremy has also been a member of Vanilla Fudge lead guitarist Vince Martell's band.

=== Albums ===
- Vince Martell of Vanilla Fudge – Vince Martell
- Psychedelic Cymbals – Vince Martell
- Vince Martell Live – Vince Martell
- Where Broken Hearts Go – Bill Pascali Project
- Adopted Son – Jeff Guenther
- Mud and Stone – Loretta Hagen
- TKO Tokyo: Live in Japan – Cactus
- An Evening in Tokyo – Cactus
- Spirit of '67 – Vanilla Fudge
- Black Dawn – Cactus

=== Singles ===
- "You've Lost That Lovin' Feeling" – Pete Bremy
- "Above the Storm" – Pete Bremy
- "Freedom" – Billy Killoran
- "Harley Chick" – Justin Jaymes
