= Capture the Sun =

Capture the Sun may refer to:

- Capture the Sun (Illogic and Blockhead album)
- Capture the Sun (Hollywood Monsters album)
- Capture the Sun, a novel by Jo Ann Algermissen
- Capture the Sun, a novel by Shirl Henke
