= Hollywood Monsters (band) =

American rock band

- Origin: Los Angeles, California, U.S.
- Genres: Hard rock; progressive rock; heavy metal
- Years active: 2013–2021
- Labels: Cleopatra Records; Deadline Music; Mausoleum Records; Rock N Growl Records; Universal Music
- Past members: Steph Honde; Ronnie Robson; Don Airey; Vinny Appice; Tim Bogert; Neil Murray; Pascal Mulot; Tracy G Janita Haan; Darren Crisp; Andreas "Habo" Johansson
- Website: Facebook account

Hollywood Monsters was an American hard rock supergroup from Los Angeles, California, formed in 2013. The band members include Steph Honde (vocals, guitars), Don Airey (keyboards; Deep Purple, previously played in Whitesnake, Gary Moore, Ozzy Osbourne, Michael Schenker Group), Danko Jones (vocals), Ronnie Robson (bass), Vinny Appice (drums; previously played in Dio, Black Sabbath, Heaven & Hell, Kill Devil Hill, and others), and Tim Bogert (bass; previously played in Vanilla Fudge, Cactus, and Beck, Bogert & Appice).

The band's music genre is commonly referred to as hard rock reminiscent of the 1970s, yet their sound was also influenced by progressive rock and heavy metal. The band's most distinctive features are the vocals and guitar of Steph Honde, as well as his melodic and versatile approach to songwriting which add a modern touch to the classic hard rock sound.

== History ==
The band was formed in 2013 by the frontman, Steph Honde, a French singer, songwriter and multi-instrumentalist (vocals, guitar, piano, bass guitar). Stéphane Honde (known professionally as Steph Honde) was born on 5 September 1975 in Manosque, France. Honde achieved great success in France as a guitarist. He started his musical career as the frontman of the French band Mamooth. Later Honde garnered a reputation as a guitar virtuoso when playing in the French hard rock band Café Bertrand in 2004–2010. Honde recorded two albums with Café Bertrand: Les Airs Empruntés (2005) and L'Art délicat du Rock'N'Roll (2008). He was the sole songwriter of the latter. Both albums were critically acclaimed and commercially successful. Café Bertrand was chosen to be the opening band for the Deep Purple European leg of the Rapture of the Deep tour which included 36 dates across Europe in October and November 2006 and another 12 dates in France in March 2007. Café Bertrand played at giant stadiums such as Stade de France, with an audience capacity in excess of 80,000. In 2009 Café Bertrand was the support band for two AC/DC shows in France during the Black Ice World Tour: on 9 June 2009 at Stade Vélodrome in Marseille and on 12 June 2009 at Stade de France in Paris. In July 2009 Café Bertrand played at the Montreux Jazz Festival.

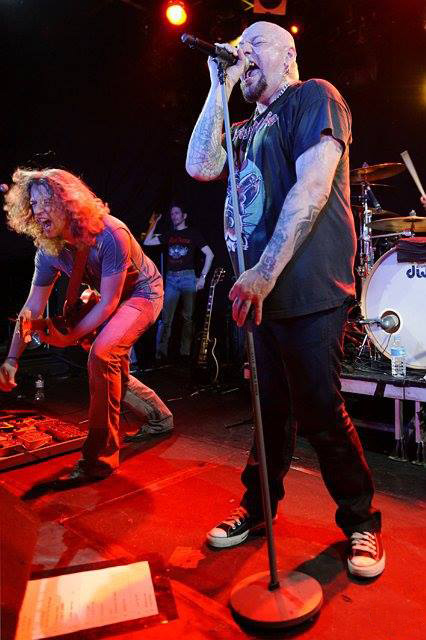
Steph Honde and Paul Di'Anno live in 2010

In 2010, after leaving the band Café Bertrand, Steph Honde toured with Paul Di'Anno (the original vocalist of Iron Maiden) and The Stars. In 2012 Steph Honde emigrated to California, U.S. and started working on his own project, the band Hollywood Monsters which features legendary guest musicians. Steph Honde created the project in 2013 and is the only songwriter of the project, including the band's debut album Big Trouble.

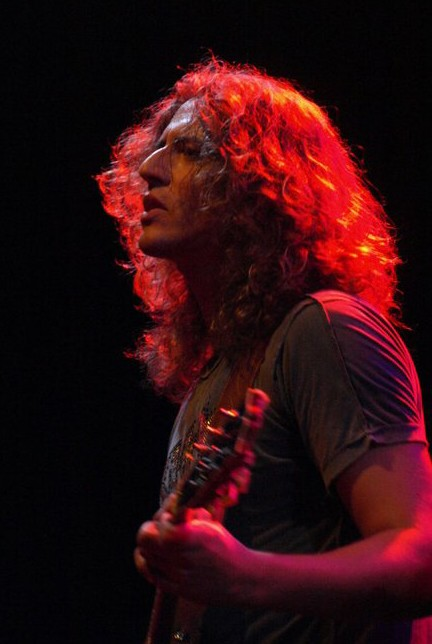
Steph Honde live in France, 2010

Steph Honde met Don Airey in 2006 when Honde's then-current band Café Bertrand was the opening band for the Deep Purple European leg of the Rapture of the Deep tour. Tim Bogert appreciated the demo recordings suggested to him by Steph Honde and agreed to play on three tracks of the album despite the fact he had been in retirement for several years prior to the recording of the album Big Trouble. Vinny Appice plays drums on most of the tracks on the album. Steph Honde wrote the song "Village of the Damned" as an homage to Vinny Appice before even meeting him. Paul Di'Anno (lead vocals on bonus track "Fuck You All") chose the song himself from the number of songs suggested to him by Steph Honde. They met in 2010 when Honde's then-current band The Stars accompanied Paul Di'Anno on tour across France.

Hollywood Monsters were working on their third album called Thriving on Chaos. The album would have featured Steph Honde, Vinny Appice, Tim Bogert, Ronnie Robson, Danko Jones, Blitz from the band Overkill among others.

Thriving on Chaos was an eleven track release; it also included a nine track bonus album titled A State of Nature, which is an acoustic album that includes songs from the earliest band's catalogue, new songs, and a few cover songs. Another bonus album called Isolated Incidents will be available, and contains various demos, isolated tracks, and more.

== Members ==
- Steph Honde (lead vocals, guitar) (2013–2021)
- Danko Jones (vocals) (2013–2021)
- Ronnie Robson (bass guitar) (2017–2021)
- Vinny Appice (drums) (2013–2021)
- Tim Bogert (bass guitar) (2013–2016; died 2021)
- Jim Crean (vocals) (2018–2021)
- Bobby "Blitz" Ellsworth (vocals) (2016–2021)
- Alexis Von Kraven (drums) (2016–2021)

== Discography ==
=== Big Trouble (2014) ===
The debut album Big Trouble was released in 2014 on Mausoleum Records and is being promoted by Rock N Growl Records. The release dates are: 23 May 2014 in the U.S., 8 July 2014 rest of the world (except Canada), 14 October 2014 in Canada (under the Universal Music label). The album Big Trouble features 10 tracks and a bonus track, all of which were written by Steph Honde.

Album track listing:

- 01. Another Day In Grey – Part 1 (music & lyrics: Steph Honde)
- 02. Move On (music & lyrics: Steph Honde)
- 03. Big Trouble (music & lyrics: Steph Honde)
- 04. The Only Way (music & lyrics: Steph Honde)
- 05. The Cage (lyrics: Steph Honde, music: D. Baruta)
- 06. The Ocean (music & lyrics: Steph Honde)
- 07. Oh Boy! (music & lyrics: Steph Honde)
- 08. Underground (music & lyrics: Steph Honde)
- 09. Village of the Damned (music & lyrics: Steph Honde)
- 10. Song For a Fool (music & lyrics: Steph Honde)
- 11. Fuck You All (bonus track) (lyrics: Steph Honde, music: Steph Honde, E. Lamic, A. Perusini, W. Gallay)

==== Studio Personnel on "Big Trouble" ====
- Steph Honde – vocals, guitars, piano, bass
- Paul Di'Anno – vocals (track 11)
- Denis Baruta – guitars (tracks 5, 9 & 11)
- Tim Bogert – bass (tracks 1, 2 & 10)
- Olivier Brossard – bass (track 11)
- Vinny Appice – drums (all tracks except 7, 10 & 11)
- Don Airey – Hammond B3 (track 2)
- Emmanuel Lamic – drums (tracks 10 & 11)
- Laetitia Gondran – drums (track 7)
- Scott Tenzer – orchestral arrangement (track 6)

=== Capture the Sun (2016) ===
The band then released its second album Capture the Sun on Cleopatra Records in 2016, with 12 brand new tracks and a bonus track included. Album track listing:

- 1 Mysteries of Life 0:48
- 2 Evilution 2:47
- 3 Always Crashing the Same Car 4:53
- 4 It's a Lie 2:49
- 5 Waiting 5:54
- 6 Don't Let it Happen 3:21
- 7 Another Day in Grey, Pt. 2 3:49
- 8 Everything is Going To Be Alright 3:08
- 9 Dreams 4:52
- 10 King For A Day 3:48
- 11 Capture The Sun 4:18
- 12 Sweet Thing / Candidate / Sweet Thing 8:19 (David Bowie)
- Bonus Track: Fool for Your Loving (Coverdale/Moody/Marsden) 4:30

==== Studio personnel on "Capture the Sun" ====
- Steph Honde: vocals, guitars, keyboards, bass
- Vinny Appice: drums
- Neil Murray: bass
- Pascal Mulot: bass
- Tony Franklin: bass
- Tim Bogert: bass
- Danko Jones: vocals
- Jenny Haan: vocals
- Tracy G: guitar
- Craig Goldy: guitar
- Alessandro Bertoni: keyboard
- Eric Lebailly: drums on "Fool For Your Loving"
- Andreas Johansson: drums on "King For a Day"
- Darren Crisp: vocals

== See also ==
- Steph Honde interview at Metal-temple.com by Jeff Legg, 21 June 2014.
- Stephane Honde (Hollywood Monsters) interview on Rock Overdose: "I took a chance on doing something a little bit different from what we hear these days".| at Rockoverdose.gr by Michael Spiggos, 10 June 2014.
- Steph Honde interview at Neoprog.eu by Togo Chubb, 23 August 2014.
- Steph Honde interview at Via Nocturna by Pedro Carvalho, 11 June 2014.
- Steph Honde interview at Arte Metal by Victor Hugo Franceschini, 12 December 2014.
- Official press release by the record label Mausoleum Records
- Movie Kill The Nazi at Action-Prod company website: teaser, plot, crew.
- Lageat, Philippe, Brelet, Baptiste (2014). AC/DC Tours De France 1976-2014. Éditions Point Barre. p. 712. ISBN 978-2-7466-7071-6. - The book features Café Bertrand as support band in 2009.
- AC/DC Tours De France - book overview on Youtube by the authors. The book features Café Bertrand as support band in 2009.
- Hollywood Monsters – Big Trouble. Album review by G.W. Hill at Music Street Journal, 29 September 2014.
- Hollywood Monsters – Big Trouble. Album review by Jeb Wright at classicrockrevisited.com 29 September 2014.
- Hollywood Monsters: Big Trouble. Album review by Craig Hartranft at Dangerdog Music Reviews, 14 May 2014.
- Chronique de Big Trouble. Album review by Togo Chubb at Neoprog, 23 June 2014.
- Hollywood Monsters – Big Trouble. Album review by Oshyrya at metalchroniques.fr 1 June 2014.
