= Black Lace (disambiguation) =

Black Lace are a British pop band, known for their 1984 single "Agadoo".

Black Lace may also refer to:

- Black Lace, an erotic fiction imprint of Virgin Books
- Black Lace, an erotic magazine for women, sister publication of BLK (magazine)
- BlackLace (band), an American heavy metal band

== See also ==
- Lace (disambiguation)
