= Custard (German band) =

German power metal band

Custard is a German power metal band.

== Discography ==
- Kingdoms of Your Life (1999, Point Music Distribution)
- For My King (2000, B.O. Records)
- Wheels of Time (2005, Mausoleum Records)
- Forces Remain (2008, Dr. Music Records)
- Infested by Anger (2012, Pure Steel Records)
- A Realm of Tales (2017, Pure Steel Records)
- Imperium Rapax (2021, Pure Steel Records)
