= Stormhammer =

German metal band

Stormhammer, stylized StormHammer, is a power metal group from Munich, Germany. Active since 1993, they notably released two albums on Century Media Records, one on Mausoleum Records and three on Massacre Records.

== Reception ==
Their debut album Fireball received several negative reviews. Metal.de bestowed 4 of 10 points upon the record, stating that Stormhammer brought little new besides "the typical standard power metal cliches". Only two of the eleven songs stuck in the memory, those being "Holy Wars" and "Possibilities". Paul Schwarz of the web zine Chronicles of Chaos similarly lamented the lack of innovation, save for "a decent lick here and there". "I find Stormhammer hard enough to tolerate for a few songs; listening to all 55 minutes of this creative dinosaur gives me the martyred feeling of suffering for my art". The grade was 3 out of 10. Borås Tidning in Sweden called Stormhammer a "shit band" and their album "excrement". The singer barely hit any tones, the musicians were mediocre and had "no songwriting talent whatsoever". However, Rockhard.de gave the album 8 out of 10. The specialist website Powermetal.de also found that Fireball would "definitely hit most true metal lovers", and that "one probably shouldn't miss" Steamhammer's autumn 2000 tour with Morgana Lefay, Steel Prophet and Angel Dust.

== Discography ==
- Fireball (2000, Century Media)
- Cold Desert Moon (2001, Century Media)
- Lord of Darkness (2004, Mausoleum)
- Signs of Revolution (2009, Silverwolf-Productions)
- Echoes of a Lost Paradise (2015, Massacre)
- Welcome to the End (2017, Massacre)
- Seven Seals (2019, Massacre)
- Wrath of the Hammer (2026, ROAR!)
