= Gods of Silence =

Swiss metal band

Gods of Silence is a Swiss melodic metal band. Initially named Kirk, they released two albums under that name and one as Gods of Silence.

== Kirk era ==
Kirk was founded in 1994 and consisted of vocalist Thomi Rauch, guitarist Sammy Lasagni, bass player Daniel Pfister, keyboardist Bruno Berger and drummer Vito Cecere. Their first album was called The Final Dance and came out through Point Music Distribution in 2003.Rock Hard only gave it 5 out of 10 points.

Following Cecere's departure, the band went on hiatus until 2009, when drummer Philipp Eichenberger of Legenda Aurea was recruited. The band also signed for Mausoleum Records. Kirk's second album Masquerade was produced by Dennis Ward and released in 2014.

Rock Hard this time improved their rating to 7 out of 10 points. Norway's Scream Magazine gave 4 out of 6 points. Following a "stylistically anonymous" opening track, Kirk improved with several "euphonous" tunes, especially the title track. "At times it is a little boring, but the album has its bright sides as well". Powermetal.de rated it even higher, at 8.5/10. "The album is a complete success and boasts several memorable tunes"; though it also featured "rather unusual cover art", the production was "fantastic" and the musicianship solid. The highest possible score was given by Craig Hartranft of Dangerdog.

== Gods of Silence era ==
After singer Thomi Rauch left and was replaced by Gilbi Meléndez, the name change to Gods of Silence came about. The first album under this moniker followed soon, 2017's Neverland on Rock of Angels Records.

Powermetal.de gave the same score as on Masquerade, 8.5 points. The new singer was "talented" and "sounds like Jorn Lande", there were "convincing, powerful riffs", a "knack for catchy melodies and choruses" and the "production is top-notch". Metal Hammer Germany also praised the band for playing "melodic, but mostly hard-hitting heavy metal without any hint of kitsch", scoring it 5 out of 7. Craig Hartranft gave a slightly lower review than last time with 4.5 points, whereas Metal Express Radio stopped on a 7/10.

Gods of Silence members Sammy Lasagni and Philipp Eichenberger also played in Panorama, together with Christian Palin, Ben Varon and Dennis Ward, releasing Around the World in 2018.

== Discography ==
As Kirk

- The Final Dance (2003, Point Music Distribution)
- Masquerade (2014, Mausoleum Records)

As Gods of Silence

- Neverland (2017, Rock of Angels Records)
