= Rock & Roll (Vanilla Fudge album) =

Studio album by Vanilla Fudge
- Released: September 1969
- Recorded: Atlantic Studios, New York City
- Genres: Hard rock, psychedelic rock
- Length: 39:44 (original LP); 48:07 (1991 CD); 1:00:01 (1998 CD); 52:02 (2013 CD)
- Label: Atco
- Producer: Adrian Barber

Vanilla Fudge chronology
Near the Beginning (1969)	Rock & Roll (1969)	Best of Vanilla Fudge (1982)

Professional ratings
Review scores
Source	Rating
Allmusic	2.5/5 stars

Rock & Roll is the fifth album by American psychedelic rock band Vanilla Fudge, released in September 1969. It peaked at No. 34 on the Billboard album charts in October of that year. The album was the band's last studio album prior to their initial break-up in the spring of 1970.

== Track listing ==
Side one
No.	Title	Writer(s)	Length
1.	"Need Love"	Carmine Appice; Tim Bogert; Vince Martell; Mark Stein	4:57
2.	"Lord in the Country"	Stein	4:30
3.	"I Can't Make It Alone"	Gerry Goffin; Carole King	4:45
4.	"Street Walking Woman"	Appice; Bogert; Martell; Stein	6:00

Side two
No.	Title	Writer(s)	Length
5.	"Church Bells of St. Martins"	Stein	4:40
6.	"The Windmills of Your Mind"	Alan Bergman; Marilyn Bergman; Michel Legrand	8:52
7.	"If You Gotta Make a Fool of Somebody"	Rudy Clark	6:00
Total length:			39:44

== Personnel ==
- Carmine Appice – drums, lead vocals on track 7
- Tim Bogert – bass guitar, backing vocals
- Vince Martell – guitar, lead vocals on track 1, 4
- Mark Stein – keyboards, lead vocals on track 2, 3, 5, 6, 7
