= Renaissance (Vanilla Fudge album) =

Studio album by Vanilla Fudge
- Released: June 14, 1968
- Recorded: Ultra-Sonic Studios, Hempstead, L.I.
- Genre: Psychedelic rock, acid rock
- Length: 40:59 (original LP); 52:02 (1991 CD); 50:06 (1998 CD)
- Label: Atco
- Producer: Shadow Morton

Vanilla Fudge chronology
The Beat Goes On (1968)	Renaissance (1968)	Near the Beginning (1969)

Renaissance (Atco Records catalog no. [SD] 33-244; originally available in both mono and stereo) is the third album by rock band Vanilla Fudge, released in June 1968. It was their first album to feature mostly original material, with five of its seven tracks penned by band members.

In addition to the band's original songs, Renaissance also included "The Spell That Comes After" (written by Frank Zappa's and Herb Cohen's protege Essra Mohawk, but erroneously credited on original pressings of the LP to Zappa's art director Cal Schenkel), and a cover version of "Season of the Witch", originally written and performed by Scottish folk singer Donovan. The band also interpolates lyrics from a second Essra Mohawk song, "We Never Learn", into their rendition of "Season of the Witch".

CD reissues of Renaissance include three additional songs that were originally released as non-LP singles concurrently with the album.

Renaissance peaked at #20 on the Billboard album charts in July 1968. It also reached #8 in Finland.

The single, Season Of The Witch, PT. 1, reached #52 in Canada.

Professional ratings
Review scores
Source	Rating
Allmusic	2/5 stars

== Track listing ==
Side 1
No.	Title	Writer(s)	Length
1.	"The Sky Cried/When I Was a Boy"	Mark Stein, Tim Bogert	7:36
2.	"Thoughts"	Vince Martell	3:28
3.	"Paradise"	Stein, Carmine Appice	5:59
4.	"That's What Makes a Man"	Stein	4:28

Side 2
No.	Title	Writer(s)	Length
5.	"The Spell That Comes After"	Essra Mohawk	4:29
6.	"Faceless People"	Appice	5:55
7.	"Season of the Witch"	Donovan Leitch; interpolating "We Never Learn" by Essra Mohawk	8:40

1991 Repertoire Records CD bonus tracks
No.	Title	Writer(s)	Length
8.	"You Keep Me Hanging On" (7" version)	Brian Holland, Lamont Dozier	2:50
9.	"Come By Day Come By Night"	Stein	2:53
10.	"People"	Appice, Stein, Bogert, Martell	5:16

1998 Sundazed Music CD bonus tracks
No.	Title	Writer(s)	Length
8.	"All in Your Mind"	Appice, Bogert, Martell, Stein	2:58
9.	"The Look of Love"	Burt Bacharach, Hal David	2:49
10.	"Where Is My Mind"	Stein	2:44

== Charts ==
Chart (1968/70)	Position
Australia (Kent Music Report)	32
United States (Billboard 200)	20

== Personnel ==
- Carmine Appice - drums, backing vocals, lead vocal (track 6)
- Tim Bogert - bass guitar, backing vocals, co-lead vocal (track 1)
- Vince Martell - electric guitar, backing vocals, co-lead vocal (track 2), lead vocal (track 7)
- Mark Stein - keyboards, lead vocals (tracks 3, 4 & 5), co-lead vocals (tracks 1 & 2)
