= Darxon =

German heavy metal band

- Also known as: Noxrad (2006–present)
- Origin: Dortmund, Germany
- Genre: Heavy metal
- Years active: 1983–1989, 1992, 2006–present
- Labels: Wishbone, Rockport, Mausoleum
- Members: Jens Frank; Jochen Fünders; Conny Beck; Thilo Voiss
- Past members: Massimo DeMatteis; Markus Szart; Peter Schmidt; Dominik Hulshorst; Wolfgang "Wolly" Böhm; Michael Habestadt; Thomas Smuszysnki; Ingo Pluss; Klaus Lemm; Herbert Dreger; Frank Dielewski; Thomas Thanscheidt; Ingo "Pink" Geiger; Jan Yildiral

Darxon is a German heavy metal band formed in Dortmund in 1983. Their debut album, Killed in Action, was recorded as a quartet of vocalist Massimo DeMatteis, guitarist Markus Szarf, bassist Peter Schmidt, and drummer Dominik Hulshorst, produced by Ferdinand Kother at the Tonstudio Cooperative GmbH in Bochum. A four track EP, Tokyo, was released in 1985, with a 7" vinyl single, Holding On, following in 1986.

Their 1987 No Thrills album, on new label Rockport Records, featured Darxon's new line-up, including: guitarists Wolfgang Böhm and Michael Habestadt, bassist Thomas Smuszynski, and drummer Ingo Plass. Darxon supported Zed Yago in Germany in 1988. That year the band changed again, keeping Böhm with singer Klaus Lemm, and introducing: guitarist Jens Frank, Jochen Fünders and Herbert Dreger. This line-up disbanded in 1989.

Darxon re-assembled once again for a third album, from Belgian label Mausoleum Records. Massimo DeMatteis was joined by guitarists Frank Dielewski and Thomas Thanscheidt, bassist Ingo "Pink" Geiger, and Steeler drummer Jan Yildiral. The band then went into hiatus.

Darxon was recreated for live work by Jens Frank in 2006, and renamed Noxrad. The band now included former bassist Jochen Fünders, singer Conny Beck (of Belda Beast, Fyre, Riccochet, and Second Sight), with Thilo Voiss (from Aardvarks and Riccochet) on drums.

== Current members ==
- Jens Frank – guitars (1988–1989) (2006–present)
- Jochen Fünders – bass (1988–1989) (2006–present)
- Conny Beck – vocals (2006–present)
- Thilo Voiss – drums (2006–present)

== Former members ==
- Massimo DeMatteis – vocals (1983–1988) (1992)
- Markus Szarf – lead guitar (1983–1987)
- Peter Schmidt – bass (1983–1987)
- Dominik Hulshorst – drums (1983–1987)
- Wolfgang Bohm – lead guitar (1987–1989)
- Michael Hebestadt – rhythm guitar (1987–1989)
- Klaus Lemm – vocals (1988–1989)
- Thomas Smuszynski – bass (1987)
- Ingo Plass – drums (1987)
- Herbert Dreger – drums (1988–1989)
- Frank Dielewski – lead guitar (1992)
- Thomas Thanscheidt – rhythm guitar (1992)
- Ingo "Pink" Geiger – bass (1992)
- Jan Yildiral – drums (1992)

== Discography ==
=== Studio albums ===
- Killed in Action (1984)
- No Thrills (1987)
- Shout! (1992)

=== EPs ===
- Tokyo (1985)

=== Singles ===
- "Holding On" (1986)
