= Even Vast =

Italian gothic metal band

Even Vast is an Italian gothic metal band.

The band was founded in Italy, but was later based in England.

== Discography ==
- Hear Me Out (1999, Black Lotus Records)
- "Dawning Gloom" (single, 2001, Painkiller Records)
- Outsleeping (2003, Mausoleum Records)
- Teach Me How to Bleed (2007, My Kingdom Music)
- Warped Existence (2019, The Goatmancer Records)
