= The Beat Goes On (Vanilla Fudge album) =

Studio album by Vanilla Fudge
- Released: February 1968
- Studio: Ultra-Sonic Studios, Hempstead, Long Island
- Genre: Psychedelic rock; proto-prog; sound collage
- Length: 44:06 (original LP); 52:00 (CD reissue)
- Label: Atco
- Producer: John Linde, Shadow Morton

Vanilla Fudge chronology
Vanilla Fudge (1967)	The Beat Goes On (1968)	Renaissance (1968)

Professional ratings
Review scores
Source	Rating
AllMusic	3/5 stars

The Beat Goes On (Atco Records 33-237/mono, SD 33-237/stereo) is the second album by the American psychedelic rock band Vanilla Fudge, released in early 1968. The album doesn't contain any actual "songs", but rather a sound collage featuring many different elements: the voices of world leaders past and present, the band reciting pre-written mantras and reflections, and excerpts of songs (done "Vanilla Fudge style") by The Beatles and Sonny Bono.

== Recording ==
The group was at odds with producer George "Shadow" Morton during recording, as Morton made his own concept album without significant input from them. In the liner notes of Sundazed Music' 1990 CD reissue, the band denounces it as a failed experiment on the producer's part. The Fudge's third album, Renaissance, released quickly after The Beat Goes On, would be Morton's last collaboration with the band.

In his autobiography Stick It!, Vanilla Fudge drummer Carmine Appice declares: "Even listening to it now – which, let me tell you, I rarely fucking do – The Beat Goes On sounds like an album that Spinal Tap would be wary of making."

== Reception ==
While not as successful as their debut album, The Beat Goes On was a moderate hit despite the band's reservations, peaking at #17 on the Billboard album charts in March 1968. It reached number 9 in Finland in April 1968. Music author Christian Matijas-Mecca describes the album as an "experimental and pretentious album" that, similarly to Frank Zappa's album Lumpy Gravy, does not live up to its meticulous collage creation.

Vanilla Fudge's The Beat Goes On is used as bumper music in the Pop Chronicles music documentary.

== Track listing ==
=== Side one ===
1. "Sketch" (Appice, Bogert, Martell, Stein) - 2:55

Phase One

2. "Intro: The Beat Goes On" (Sonny Bono) - 1:57
  1. Eighteenth Century: Variations on a Theme by Mozart: "Divertimento No. 13 In F Major" (Wolfgang Amadeus Mozart) - 0:46
  2. Nineteenth Century: "Old Black Joe" (Stephen Foster) - 0:46
  3. Twentieth Century - 3:09
    1. "Don't Fence Me In" (Cole Porter) - 0:52
    2. "12th Street Rag" (Euday L. Bowman) - 0:49
    3. "In The Mood" (Garland, Razaf) - 0:45
    4. "Hound Dog" (Jerry Leiber, Mike Stoller) - 0:43
  4. The Beatles - 1:45
    1. "I Want To Hold Your Hand" (John Lennon, Paul McCartney)
    2. "I Feel Fine" (Lennon, McCartney)
    3. "Day Tripper" (Lennon, McCartney)
    4. "She Loves You" (Lennon, McCartney)
    5. "Hello Goodbye" (Lennon, McCartney)

Phase Two

4. "The Beat Goes On" - 1:32
5. Beethoven: "Fur Elise" & "Moonlight Sonata" (Ludwig van Beethoven) - 6:33
6. "The Beat Goes On" - 1:05

=== Side two ===
7. "The Beat Goes On" - 1:00

Phase Three

8. "Voices in Time": Neville Chamberlain, Winston Churchill, Franklin Delano Roosevelt, Harry S. Truman, John F. Kennedy and Other Voices - 8:09

Phase Four

9. "The Beat Goes On" - 1:50
10. "Merchant/The Game Is Over" - 8:57
  1. "Merchant" (Appice, Bogert, Martell, Stein)
  2. "The Game Is Over" (Bourtayre, Bouchety): Vinnie
  3. "Merchant"
  4. "The Game Is Over": Tim
  5. "Merchant"
  6. "The Game Is Over": Carmine
  7. "Merchant"
  8. "The Game Is Over": Mark
  9. "Merchant"
11. "The Beat Goes On" - 2:20

Bonus Phase [CD release only]

12. "You Can't Do That" (Lennon, McCartney) - 4:27
13. "Come By Day, Come By Night" (Appice, Bogert, Martell, Stein) - 3:27

== Personnel ==
- Carmine Appice - drums, vocals
- Tim Bogert - bass, vocals
- Vince Martell - guitar, vocals
- Mark Stein - lead vocals, keyboards
