= Out Through the In Door =

Studio album by Vanilla Fudge
- Released: June 2007
- Recorded: July 2006 at the Underground, North Hollywood, California
- Genre: Psychedelic rock; hard rock
- Label: Escapi Music Group AB, Bianic Music
- Producer: Carmine Appice

Vanilla Fudge chronology
The Return (2002)	Out Through the In Door (2007)	Spirit of '67 (2015)

Out Through the In Door is the eighth album by Vanilla Fudge, released in June 2007, with the US finally following in August 2009. According to the band's official webpage, it originally was to be released in February 2007. The album title is a play on words of the 1979 Led Zeppelin album In Through the Out Door.

The following statement was taken from their website:

Coming in February, 2007... A New Album! It's true! Mark, Vince, Tim, and Carmine were in California in July recording an album of Led Zeppelin covers. Mark said, "Basically, we rearranged some songs — we're doing a lot of their stuff Vanilla Fudge style. Some of the arrangements are slowed down, and some speeded up but I think we've done the songs justice."

In September 2022, a remastered reissue of the album, titled Vanilla Zeppelin, was released with an altered track listing and new cover art by Australian label Golden Robot Records.

Professional ratings
Review scores
Source	Rating
Allmusic	3.5/5 stars
Terrorizer Magazine	6/10 stars

== Track listing ==
1. "Immigrant Song" (Jimmy Page, Robert Plant)
2. "Ramble On" (Page, Plant)
3. "Trampled Under Foot" (John Paul Jones, Page, Plant)
4. "Dazed and Confused" (Page)
5. "Black Mountain Side" (Page)
6. "Fool in the Rain" (Jones, Page, Plant)
7. "Babe I'm Gonna Leave You" (Anne Bredon)
8. "Dancing Days"* (Page, Plant)
9. "Moby Dick" (John Bonham, Jones, Page)
10. "All My Love" (Jones, Plant)
11. "Rock and Roll" (Bonham, Jones, Page, Plant)
12. "Your Time Is Gonna Come" (Jones, Page, Plant)

== Personnel ==
Vanilla Fudge

- Carmine Appice – drums, vocals, lead vocals on "Trampled Under Foot"
- Tim Bogert – bass guitar, vocals
- Vince Martell – guitar, vocals, lead vocals on "Rock and Roll"
- Mark Stein – lead vocals, keyboards

Additional personnel

- Teddy (Zig Zag) Andreadis – backing vocals
- Tom Vitorino – backing vocals, vocal production, outside inspiration
- Chris Morrison – recording engineer
- Pat Regan and Carmine Appice – mixing
- Brad Vance at Red Mastering – mastering
- Vince Wasilewski – recording engineer (lead vocals on "Immigrant Song" and "Ramble On" at Otherworld Studios – Fort Lauderdale, FL)
- Chuck Wright – layout, design
