= The New Age of Atlantic =

Compilation album by Various Artists
- Released: March 1972
- Genre: Rock
- Length: 45:19
- Label: Atlantic K20024
- Producer: Various

Series chronology
The Age of Atlantic (1970)	The New Age of Atlantic (1972)

The New Age of Atlantic, released in 1972, was the third in a series of rock music samplers released by the Atlantic label in the UK. The collection is notable for its inclusion of two tracks, those by Yes and Led Zeppelin, unavailable in the UK at the time. It reached no. 25 on the UK album charts in 1972.

== Track listing ==
=== Side one ===
1. Led Zeppelin: "Hey, Hey, What Can I Do" (John Bonham, John Paul Jones, Jimmy Page, Robert Plant) – 3:53 (from "Immigrant Song" US single B-side, cat. no. 2777, 1970)
2. Loudon Wainwright III: "Motel Blues" (L. Wainwright) – 2:43 (from Album II, cat. no. K40272, 1971)
3. Gordon Haskell: "Sitting by the Fire" (Haskell) – 3:41 (from It Is and It Isn't, cat. no. K40311, 1972)
4. Dr. John: "Where Ya at Mule" (Mac Rebennack) – 4:55 (from The Sun, Moon & Herbs, cat. no. K40250, 1971)
5. Buffalo Springfield: "Bluebird" (Stephen Stills) – 4:28 (from Buffalo Springfield Again, cat. no. K40014, 1967)
6. Delaney, Bonnie & Friends: "Only You Know And I Know" (Dave Mason) – 3:24 (from D&B Together, cat. no. CBS KC 31377, 1972)

=== Side two ===
1. Cactus: "Long Tall Sally" (Robert "Bumps" Blackwell, Enotris Johnson, Richard Penniman) – 3:03 (from One Way... or Another, cat. no. K12345, 1971)
2. Jonathan Edwards: "Everybody Knows Her" (Edwards) – 1:53 (from Jonathan Edwards, cat. no. K40282, 1971)
3. The J. Geils Band: "I Don't Need You No More" (Peter Wolf, Seth Justman) – 2:35 (from The Morning After, cat. no. K40293, 1971)
4. John Prine: "Sam Stone" (Prine) – 4:14 (from John Prine cat. no. K40357, 1971)
5. Yes: "America" (Paul Simon) – 10:30 (previously unreleased)
