= Steve Byrd =

- Birth name: Stephen John Byrd
- Born: 25 September 1955; Sheffield, England
- Died: 2 October 2016 (aged 61)
- Occupation: Guitarist
- Instrument: Guitar
- Years active: 1975–2016
- Formerly of: Kim Wilde; Ian Gillan

Stephen John "Steve" Byrd (25 September 1955 – 2 October 2016) was an English guitarist and session musician who has worked with artists including Kim Wilde (from 1982–95), Ian Gillan of Deep Purple, ZZebra and many others.

Initially a self-taught guitarist born in Sheffield, England, Byrd joined the band Zzebra for their second album Panic, after his old friend Tommy Eyre had recommended him for the job. With Zzebra he played the Reading Festival in 1975 and recorded another album, Take It or Leave It

In 1978 he replaced Robin Simon in Ian North's band Neo, a new wave band formed in 1977. Neo recorded an album in Ian Gillan's studio, and after Gillan had heard them he hired Byrd and bassist John McCoy for his own band, which was also called Gillan.

The band recorded their first album Gillan in September 1978. It was not released in the UK but sold well as an import.

In 1982, Byrd auditioned for pop singer Kim Wilde and became a long-term member of Kim's backing band. With Kim, he co-wrote "Another Step (Closer to You)", "Hey Mister Heartache" and many other songs as well as played on some of her albums. He toured with Kim Wilde until the mid-1990s

In the 1990s, he was also a member of 4 Bills And A Ben, a band with flexible line-up formed by Johnny Warman which also included Jeff Rich and John Edwards from Status Quo.

In 2001, he played in 'The Mods' at the Steve Marriott tribute.

Other acts Byrd toured with were The Buggles, Martha and the Muffins, Billy Ocean, Ruby Turner, Samantha Fox, A Flock of Seagulls, Pet Shop Boys, Erasure, Bonnie Tyler, Alec Mansion, Shakin' Stevens, Heartbeat UK and Kim Appleby. He was the MD of the Byrdsongs record label. In 2014 he formed "Steve Byrds Ethnic Soup" along with drummer Dave Layton and singer Rosanna J Eastman.

Steve Byrd died of a heart attack in Munich, Germany on 2 October 2016 aged 61. Both remaining members of Steve Byrds Ethnic Soup, Dave Layton and Rosanna J Eastman carried on with the band in his honour shortening the name to "Ethnic Soup" (the name came from an instrumental of the same name which is the accompanying music on the Far Cry 4 game.) The pair also named the band's first album "Byrdsongs Jukebox" as a tribute to Steve, "Byrdsongs" being his record label. Two tracks "Legacy" and "Broken" from the album feature Steve on instruments and backing vocals.
