= Say You Really Want Me =

1986 single by Kim Wilde

Single by Kim Wilde

from the album Running Scared soundtrack and Another Step
- B-side: "She Hasn't Got Time For You"
- Released: 1 July 1986
- Genre: Dance pop, freestyle
- Length: 4:31 (Running Scared album version); 3:59 (Another Step album version); 3:29 (7-inch version)
- Label: MCA
- Songwriters: Danny Sembello; Dick Rudolph; Donnell Spencer, Jr.
- Producers: Rod Temperton; Dick Rudolph; Bruce Swedien

Music video
- "Say You Really Want Me" on YouTube

"Say You Really Want Me" is a song by Kim Wilde from the film soundtrack Running Scared and later included in edited form on Wilde's own album Another Step. In the US and Canada, it was released as a single in July 1986 from the film soundtrack. In 1987, it was released as the third and fourth single respectively in the U.K. and Australia from the Another Step album. In the U.S. & Canada, the single's cover art were featured in purple and mint colors. But in Europe, a different picture was done for the cover art with Kim laying down in a gold silk nightgown.

== North American issue ==
"Say You Really Want Me" was first issued in the US and Canada in several commercial and promotional 7" and 12" singles in July 1986 having been used in the film Running Scared. On its first release it peaked at No. 32 on Billboard's Dance Chart in December 1986.

It was later re-released there in summer 1987 on the back of Wilde's success with "You Keep Me Hangin' On." Several different versions of the song were released promotionally and commercially, making it hard for collectors to find every version. The single reached UK #29, #44 on US Billboard Hot 100 and #56 on US Cash Box Top 100 in 1987.

"Say You Really Want Me"

Single by Kim Wilde

from the album Another Step
- B-side: "Don't Say Nothing's Changed"
- Released: 27 July 1987
- Genre: Pop
- Length: 4:13 (Original album version); 3:40 (Album version); 4:02 (7-inch version)
- Label: MCA
- Songwriters: Danny Sembello; Dick Rudolph; Donnell Spencer, Jr.
- Producers: Rod Temperton; Dick Rudolph; Bruce Swedien

== UK and Australian release ==
"Say You Really Want Me" was released as a single in the UK and Australia in July 1987, hitting UK #29.

Newly remixed versions (different from any released in the US and Canada) by Wilde's brother Ricki Wilde were used for the 7" and 12" singles. Two videos were made for this release – firstly one to accompany the 7" version, and a second extended one to accompany the original U.S. 1986 12" extended remix (now known as the "video remix"). This version was also released in the UK on a 2nd 12" single separate to the one containing the new Ricki Wilde 12". "Say You Really Want Me" also marked Wilde's first cassette-single release in her home country (it contained the video remix, the 7" version and the B-side).

== Music video ==
The raunchy video was famously banned from children's television by presenter Timmy Mallett. An edited version of a music video for the song was made for MTV, where it cut some of the parts where the men and Kim touch on themselves, replacing it with scenes of Kim singing in a black and white striped crop top.

== Official versions ==
1986:

- Running Scared soundtrack album version (4:31)
- Another Step 1st pressing album version (4:13) [Edit of Running Scared soundtrack album version]
- Another Step 2nd pressing album version (3:40) [Edit of Running Scared soundtrack album version]
- Original 7" promo version A.K.A. Another Step North American album version (3:55) [Edit of Running Scared soundtrack album version]
- Original 7" version A.K.A. CHR version (3:29) [Edit of Running Scared soundtrack album version]
- Instrumental version (4:20) [Edit of Running Scared soundtrack album version with no vocals]
- Extended version A.K.A. The video mix (9:50) [Remixed by Louil Silas, Jr.]
- Radio edit (5:13) [Edit of extended version]
- David Todd remix (5:43) [Remixed by David Todd]

1987:

- U.K. 7" version (4:02) [Remixed by Ricki Wilde]
- U.K. 12" version A.K.A. Extended version (6:34) [Remixed by Ricki Wilde]
- Urban version (3:58) [Edit of The video mix]

== Track listings ==
1986:

U.S. 7" promo (MCA-52925)
No.	Title	Length
1.	"Say You Really Want Me (Original 7" promo version)"	3:55
2.	"Say You Really Want Me (Original 7" promo version)"	3:55

Canada 7" promo (MCA-52952)
No.	Title	Length
1.	"Say You Really Want Me (Original 7" promo version)"	3:55
2.	"Say You Really Want Me (Instrumental version)"	4:20

U.S. 7" promo (MCA-52952)
No.	Title	Length
1.	"Say You Really Want Me (Original 7" version)"	3:29
2.	"Say You Really Want Me (Original 7" version)"	3:29

U.S./Canada 7" (MCA-52952)
No.	Title	Length
1.	"Say You Really Want Me (Original 7" version)"	3:29
2.	"Say You Really Want Me (Radio edit)"	5:13

U.S./Canada 12" (MCA-23678)
No.	Title	Length
1.	"Say You Really Want Me (Extended version)"	9:50
2.	"Say You Really Want Me (David Todd remix)"	5:43
3.	"Say You Really Want Me (Radio edit)"	5:13

1987:

U.S. promo 7" (MCA-53130)
No.	Title	Length
1.	"Say You Really Want Me (CHR version)"	3:29
2.	"Say You Really Want Me (Urban version)"	3:58

U.S./Canada 7" (MCA-53130)
No.	Title	Length
1.	"Say You Really Want Me (CHR version)"	3:29
2.	"She Hasn't Got Time For You"	4:14

U.K./Australia 7" (MCA KIM 6/MCA 7-53130)
No.	Title	Length
1.	"Say You Really Want Me (U.K. 7" version)"	4:02
2.	"Don't Say Nothing's Changed"	3:54

U.K. promo/U.K./Australia 12" (MCA WKIMT 6/MCA KIMT 6/MCA 0-23678) (Regular U.K. 12" included poster)
No.	Title	Length
1.	"Say You Really Want Me (Extended version)"	6:34
2.	"Say You Really Want Me (U.K. 7" version)"	4:02
3.	"Don't Say Nothing's Changed"	3:54

U.K. 12"/Cassette single (MCA KIMX 6/MCA KIMC 6)
No.	Title	Length
1.	"Say You Really Want Me (The video mix)"	9:50
2.	"Say You Really Want Me (U.K. 7" version)"	4:02
3.	"Don't Say Nothing's Changed"	3:54
