= Vanilla Fudge (album) =

Studio album by Vanilla Fudge
- Released: August 1967
- Recorded: 1967
- Genres: Psychedelic rock; acid rock; proto-prog
- Length: 42:41
- Labels: Atco (US); Atlantic (UK)
- Producer: Shadow Morton

Vanilla Fudge chronology
Vanilla Fudge (1967)	The Beat Goes On (1968)

Vanilla Fudge is the debut studio album by the American psychedelic rock band Vanilla Fudge. Released in summer 1967 as Atco 33-224/mono, SD 33-224/stereo, it consists entirely of half-speed covers and three short original instrumental compositions.

The album was Vanilla Fudge's most successful, peaking at #6 on the Billboard album charts and number #8 in Finland in November 1967. Parts of the original stereo LP were actually mixed in mono, including the entire track "You Keep Me Hangin' On". An edited version of "You Keep Me Hangin' On" was released as a single and also charted.

== Music ==
According to Classic Rock Magazine, the album's cover tracks "were all slowed down to near doom pace, and given a hard-style treatment."

== Reception and legacy ==
Professional ratings
Review scores
Source	Rating
Allmusic	4/5 stars

AllMusic's Paul Collins retrospectively rated Vanilla Fudge four out of five stars some time in the 2000s. He stated that "nobody could accuse Vanilla Fudge of bad taste in their repertoire" and that most of the tracks "share a common structure of a disjointed warm-up jam, a Hammond-heavy dirge of harmonized vocals at the center, and a final flat-out jam." However, he also said that "each song still works as a time capsule of American psychedelia."

The staff of Classic Rock Magazine wrote in 2021: "Released a year before Led Zeppelin blasted into action, the Fudge are one of those crucial bands who mixed heavy blues, psychedelia and raucously progressive musicianship in a way that helped pioneer what we now regard as metal."

== Track listing ==
Side one
No.	Title	Writer(s)	Length
1.	"Ticket to Ride"	John Lennon, Paul McCartney	5:40
2.	"People Get Ready"	Curtis Mayfield	6:30
3.	"She's Not There"	Rod Argent	4:55
4.	"Bang Bang"	Sonny Bono	5:20

Side 1 of the album ends with: "The following is a series of high-frequency tones..."

Side two
No.	Title	Writer(s)	Length
5.	"Illusions of My Childhood-Part One"	Carmine Appice, Tim Bogert, Vince Martell, Mark Stein	0:20
6.	"You Keep Me Hanging On"	Brian Holland, Lamont Dozier, Eddie Holland	7:26
7.	"Illusions of My Childhood-Part Two"	Appice, Bogert, Martell, Stein	0:23
8.	"Take Me for a Little While"	Trade Martin	3:27
9.	"Illusions of My Childhood-Part Three"	Appice, Bogert, Martell, Stein	0:22
10.	"Eleanor Rigby"	Lennon, McCartney	8:24

CD reissues have a modified track listing for the tracks on side 2 of the LP:

No.	Title	Writer(s)	Length
5.	"STRA (Illusions of My Childhood-Part One)"	Appice, Bogert, Martell, Stein	0:20
6.	"You Keep Me Hanging On"	Holland, Dozier, Holland	7:26
7.	"WBER (Illusions of My Childhood-Part Two)"	Appice, Bogert, Martell, Stein	0:23
8.	"Take Me for a Little While"	Martin	3:27
9.	"RYFI (Illusions of My Childhood-Part Three)"	Appice, Bogert, Martell, Stein	0:22
10.	"Eleanor Rigby"	Lennon, McCartney	8:03
11.	"ELDS"	Appice, Bogert, Martell, Stein	0:21

The text in all uppercase letters in the CD reissue track listing spells out "STRAWBERRYFIELDS".

== Personnel ==
- Carmine Appice — drums, vocals
- Tim Bogert — bass, vocals
- Vince Martell — guitar, vocals
- Mark Stein — lead vocals, keyboards

== Certifications ==
Region	Certification	Certified units/sales
United States (RIAA)	Gold	500,000^{^}
^{^} Shipments figures based on certification alone.
