= Near the Beginning =

Studio album by Vanilla Fudge
- Released: February 1969
- Studios: Mirasound (New York); Record Plant (New York); Shrine Auditorium
- Genre: Psychedelic rock
- Length: 44:10 (original LP); 46:56 (1991 CD); 57:44 (1998 CD)
- Label: Atco
- Producer: Vanilla Fudge

Vanilla Fudge chronology
Renaissance (1968)	Near the Beginning (1969)	Rock & Roll (1969)

Professional ratings
Review scores
Source	Rating
Allmusic	3/5 stars
Džuboks	(Mixed)

Near the Beginning (ATCO Records 33–278) is the fourth album by the American psychedelic rock band Vanilla Fudge. It was released early 1969 and featured a cover of the Jr. Walker & the All Stars song "Shotgun".

The album peaked at #16 on the Billboard album charts in March 1969.

== Track listing ==
Side 1
No.	Title	Writer(s)	Length
1.	"Shotgun"	Autry DeWalt	6:10
2.	"Some Velvet Morning"	Lee Hazlewood	7:34
3.	"Where Is Happiness"	Carmine Appice	6:59

Side 2
No.	Title	Writer(s)	Length
4.	"Break Song" (Live at the Shrine Auditorium, Los Angeles)	Carmine Appice, Tim Bogert, Vince Martell, Mark Stein	23:27

1991 Repertoire Records CD bonus track
No.	Title	Writer(s)	Length
5.	"The Look of Love"	Burt Bacharach, Hal David	2:46

1998 Sundazed Music CD bonus tracks
No.	Title	Writer(s)	Length
5.	"Good Good Lovin'" (Unedited version)	Carmine Appice, Tim Bogert, Vince Martell, Mark Stein	5:45
6.	"Shotgun" (Single version)	Autry DeWalt	2:33
7.	"People" (Single)	Carmine Appice, Tim Bogert, Vince Martell, Mark Stein	5:20

== Personnel ==
- Carmine Appice - drums, vocals
- Tim Bogert - bass, vocals
- Vince Martell - guitar, vocals
- Mark Stein - lead vocals, keyboards

== Charts ==
Chart (1969)	Peak position
Italian Albums (HitParadeItalia)	1
