= Hyades (band) =

- Origin: Lombardy, Italy
- Genres: Thrash metal Crossover thrash
- Years active: 1996–present
- Labels: Punishment18 Records, Mausoleum Records
- Members: Lorenzo Testa; Marco Negonda; Rob Orlando; Marco Colombo; Rodolfo Ridolfi
- Past members: Jerico Biagiotti; Mauro De Brasi
- Website: www.hyades.us

Hyades is a thrash metal band from Busto Arsizio, Italy, formed in 1996.

== History ==
Hyades was formed in 1996 by Lorenzo Testa. After eight years in the metal underground and releasing self-produced demos, the band signed with Belgian label Mausoleum Records and released their debut album, Abuse Your Illusions, gaining worldwide attention. A few years before the thrash metal revival, Hyades produced a blend of European and old-school US thrash metal with fast drumming, mosh guitar riffing, old-school vocals, and socially critical lyrics with a sense of humor.

After the release of Abuse Your Illusions in 2004, Hyades toured Europe with Omen, playing for the first time in Germany, Denmark, Austria, Belgium, Netherlands and Switzerland.
The band released their second full-length album, And the Worst is yet to Come, in 2007, and continued to play all over Europe, sharing the stage with Onslaught, Sinister, Helstar, Tankard, Violator and others. Cover artwork was designed by Ed Repka, known for creating Megadeth's mascot Vic Rattlehead and Dark Angel's logo.
Following a show with Tankard, the band took part in Best Case Scenario: 25 Years in Beers, Tankard compilation/tribute album released by AFM Records in 2007, with a cover of Tankard's "Alien", originally on the Alien EP (1989).

In 2008, Metal Hammer UK (Thrash Metal Collector's Special 2008) listed Hyades among the most representative 30 active thrash metal bands, with Exodus, Forbidden and others.
Hyades released the third album, The Roots of Trash, in 2009, and toured Europe. After releasing three albums in a short period, the band took a break to concentrate on other projects.

At the end of 2014, Hyades signed with Italian record label Punishment18 and started recording an album in January 2015 at Studio Decibel in Busto Arsizio, Italy. The album, The Wolves Are Getting Hungry, mastered by Andy Classen at Stage One Studio, was released on 29 June 2015.

== Line-up ==
=== Current line-up ===
- Lorenzo Testa - guitar
- Marco Negonda - guitar
- Rob Orlando - bass
- Marco Colombo - vocals
- Rodolfo Ridolfi - drums

=== Past members ===
- Omar Ceriotti - drums (1996–2002)
- Jerico Biagiotti - bass (2008–2009)
- Mauro De Brasi - drums (2003–2005)

== Discography ==
- 2002 - No Bullshit, Just Metal Ep
- 2005 - Abuse Your Illusions
- 2007 - And the Worst is Yet to Come
- 2009 - The Roots of Trash
- 2015 - The Wolves Are Getting Hungry

=== Demo ===
- 1999 - Princess of The Rain
- 2000 - MCLXXVII
- 2001 - No Bullshit, Just Metal
- 2002 - Hyades
