= Capture the Sun (Hollywood Monsters album) =

Studio album by Hollywood Monsters
- Released: October 7, 2016
- Genre: hard rock
- Length: 53:16
- Label: Deadline, Cleopatra

Hollywood Monsters chronology
| Big Trouble (2014) | Capture the Sun (2016) |

Capture the Sun is the second studio album of the American hard rock supergroup Hollywood Monsters. This album features Steph Honde and Vinny Appice (Black Sabbath) and includes 12 brand new tracks with a bonus track Fool For Your Loving.

== Track listing ==
Tracks:-

| No. | Title | Length |
|---|---|---|
| 1. | "Mysteries of Life" | 0:48 |
| 2. | "Evilution" | 2:47 |
| 3. | "Always Crashing the Same Car" | 4:53 |
| 4. | "It's a Lie" | 2:49 |
| 5. | "Waiting" | 5:54 |
| 6. | "Don't Let it Happen" | 3:21 |
| 7. | "Another Day in Grey, Pt. 2" | 3:49 |
| 8. | "Everything is Going To Be Alright" | 3:08 |
| 9. | "Dreams" | 4:52 |
| 10. | "King For A Day" | 3:48 |
| 11. | "Capture The Sun" | 4:18 |
| 12. | "Sweet Thing / Candidate / Sweet Thing" | 8:19 |
| 13. | "Fool for Your Loving" | 4:30 |

== Personnel ==
- Hollywood Monsters
