= BlackLace =

American heavy metal band

- Origin: New York City, US
- Genre: Heavy metal
- Years active: 1982–1987, 2004–present
- Label: Mausoleum Records

BlackLace is an American, female-fronted heavy metal band from New York City, US, formed in 1981. The band has released two studio albums.

The track "Run for Your Life" drew a little attention, but not enough to keep the band going. After the split they reformed as Damn Cheetah.

The band are not to be confused with the British novelty band Black Lace.

== Band members ==
- Maryann Scandiffio – lead vocals
- Carlo Fragnito – guitars
- Anthony Fragnito – bass, vocals
- Steve Werner – drums

== Discography ==
Year	Title	Label
1983	Out on the Attack (demo)	self-released
1984	Unlaced	Mausoleum Records
1985	Get It While It's Hot	Mausoleum Records
1985	Demo 1985 (demo)	self-released
2002	Unlaced & Get It While It's Hot (compilation)	Mausoleum Records

== External; links ==
- Metal Archives
- BlackLace discography at Discogs
- Metal Maidens
- Metallian
- The BNR Metal Pages
