= Mark Stein (musician) =

American singer-songwriter

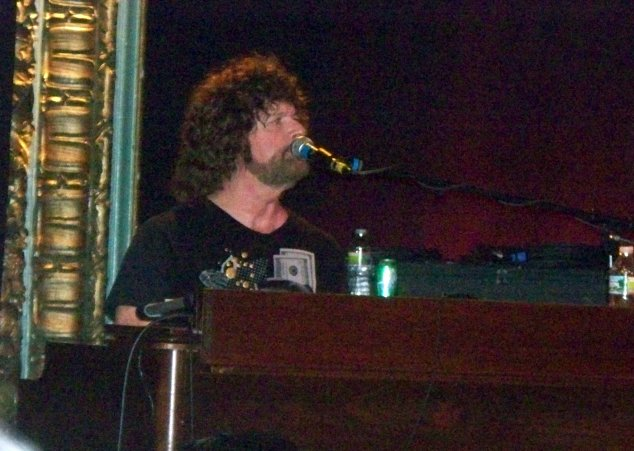
- Stein performing at the Regent Theater in Arlington, Massachusetts on March 26, 2011

Background information
- Also known as: Mark Stevens
- Born: March 11, 1947 (age 79); Bayonne, New Jersey, U.S.
- Genres: Rock, psychedelic rock, hard rock
- Occupations: Musician, composer, arranger
- Instruments: Vocals; keyboards; guitar
- Years active: 1958–present
- Member of: Vanilla Fudge
- Website: Mark Stein's official website

Mark Stein (born March 11, 1947) is an American keyboardist, composer and arranger best known for co-founding the psychedelic rock group Vanilla Fudge. He also worked briefly in the Tommy Bolin band and with Alice Cooper. Stein has guest appeared on stage with Deep Purple, Steve Miller Band and Carl Palmer. For a number of years, he also worked with Dave Mason and toured in his backing band. Stein is known for his use of the Hammond B-3 organ.

== Early life ==
Stein was born and raised in Bayonne, New Jersey. He used to watch his uncle play an upright piano that he owned, and would often play short, one finger melodies when his uncle left. His family saw he had a natural talent for the piano and started providing lessons for him at an early age, which included ones on the accordion.

== Career ==
=== 1950s & 1960s ===
Upon being exposed to rock and roll in the 1950s, Stein next took up the guitar. He worked his way through various bands in high school. In 1958, at age eleven, his local band cut a record for a small New York label. That same year, he appeared on television in Washington, D.C. on the same episode as Sam Cooke. While at Bayonette High School, he was in a band called The Charmers using the name "Mark Stevens".

Stein formed Vanilla Fudge in 1967 with Vince Martell, Carmine Appice and former bandmate Tim Bogert. The band's self-titled debut album was released in August 1967 and attained Gold Record status. Their cover of The Supremes' "You Keep Me Hangin' On" remains their signature track. Vanilla Fudge has been described by music critic Steve Huey as "one of the few American links between psychedelia and what soon became heavy metal."

=== 1970s ===
From 1970 to 1974, Stein was a member of Boomerang, a hard rock band based in New York. He was joined by Jo Casmir on bass, James Galluzi on drums and Richard Ramirez on guitar. The group released two albums under the RCA label: Boomerang (1971) and Two (1973).

Stein met Tommy Bolin in February 1976 while Bolin was a member of Deep Purple, and became a member of the first incarnation of the Tommy Bolin Band. Bolin died in December 1976, which ended the band. In 1977, Stein auditioned to be the new keyboardist for Rainbow but lost to David Stone. Later that year, Mark toured briefly with Alice Cooper during his Australian Welcome To My Nightmare Tour.

He then joined Dave Mason as a keyboardist and backing vocalist, and can be heard on Mason's Mariposa de Oro project released in 1978.

=== 1980s to present ===
Stein also contributed to Mason's Old Crest on a New Wave album from 1980, writing multiple songs and performing on the track "Save Me" which featured Michael Jackson on backing vocals. In 1986, Stein and Carmine Appice took part in Hear 'n Aid, a heavy metal supergroup who recorded an album for charity, with its proceeds helping raise over $3 million for famine relief in Africa.

Mark published his autobiography, You Keep Me Hangin’ On, in 2011. Stein also released a solo album, There's A Light, on November 26, 2021. During the pandemic of 2020, he wrote, recorded and released the single "We Are One", a reflection on the Black Lives Matter movement.

As of March 2023, Stein, Appice and Martell still continue to tour as Vanilla Fudge. He is also a touring member of the Dave Mason Band.

== Influences ==
Stein's keyboard playing was influenced by Felix Cavaliere of The Rascals, who also influenced Vanilla Fudge's style of playing of slow organ fueled rock. His vocal influences include Dusty Springfield and Wilson Pickett.

Stein himself influenced organist Jon Lord of the band Deep Purple. In a 1989 interview, Lord said: "I also used to listen to Mark Stein of Vanilla Fudge in the late sixties. He was a useful source of tricks on the Hammond."

== Discography ==
=== Vanilla Fudge ===
- Vanilla Fudge (1967)
- The Beat Goes On (1968)
- Renaissance (1968)
- Near the Beginning (1969)
- Rock & Roll (1969)
- Mystery (1984)
- The Return (2002)
- Out Through the In Door (2007)

=== Boomerang ===
- Boomerang (1971)
- Two (1973)

=== Solo ===
- White Magik (2003)
- There’s A Light (2021)

=== Other ===
- Private Eyes - Tommy Bolin (1976)
- Master's Brew - Tim Bogert (1983)

== Bibliography ==
- You Keep Me Hangin’ On (released 2011)
