= You Keep Me Hangin' On =

1966 single by the Supremes

- Picture sleeve for US vinyl single

Single by the Supremes

from the album The Supremes Sing Holland–Dozier–Holland
- B-side: "Remove This Doubt"
- Released: October 12, 1966
- Recorded: 1966
- Studio: Hitsville U.S.A. (Studio A), Detroit, Michigan
- Genre: Rock; pop; psychedelic soul
- Length: 2:40
- Label: Motown
- Songwriter: Holland–Dozier–Holland
- Producers: Brian Holland; Lamont Dozier

The Supremes singles chronology
"You Can't Hurry Love" (1966)	"You Keep Me Hangin' On" (1966)	"Love Is Here and Now You're Gone" (1967)

The Supremes Sing Holland–Dozier–Holland track listing
- 12 tracks Side one: 1. "You Keep Me Hangin' On"; 2. "You're Gone, But Always in My Heart"; 3. "Love Is Here and Now You're Gone"; 4. "Mother You, Smother You"; 5. "I Guess I'll Always Love You"; 6. "I'll Turn to Stone"; Side two: 7. "It's the Same Old Song"; 8. "Going Down for the Third Time"; 9. "Love is in Our Hearts"; 10. "Remove This Doubt"; 11. "There's No Stopping Us Now"; 12. "(Love Is Like a) Heat Wave"

"You Keep Me Hangin' On" is a song written and composed by Holland–Dozier–Holland. It was first recorded in 1966 by American Motown group the Supremes, reaching number one on the Billboard Hot 100.

The song has since been interpreted by many performers. American rock band Vanilla Fudge released a cover version in June the following year, which reached number six on the Billboard Hot 100. Wilson Pickett recorded it in 1969. English singer Kim Wilde covered "You Keep Me Hangin' On" in 1986, reaching number one on the Billboard Hot 100 in June 1987. In 1996, a version recorded by American country singer Reba McEntire reached number two on the US Billboard Hot Dance Club Play chart.

In the first 32 years of the Billboard Hot 100 rock era, "You Keep Me Hangin' On" became one of the six songs to reach number one by two different musical acts: The Supremes and Kim Wilde. The BBC ranked the Supremes' original song at number 78 on The Top 100 Digital Motown Chart, which ranks Motown releases by their all-time UK downloads and streams.

== Background ==
"You Keep Me Hangin' On" was originally recorded in 1966 by the Supremes for the Motown label. The single is rooted in proto-funk and rhythm and blues, compared to the Supremes' previous single, "You Can't Hurry Love", which uses the call and response elements akin to gospel. The song's signature guitar part is said to have originated from a Morse code–like radio sound effect, typically used before a news announcement, heard by Lamont Dozier. Dozier collaborated with Brian and Eddie Holland to integrate the idea into a single.

Many elements of the recording, including the guitars, the drums, and Diana Ross's vocals were multitracked, a production technique which was established and popularized concurrently by Holland–Dozier–Holland (H–D–H) and other premier producers of the 1960s such as Phil Spector (see Wall of Sound) and George Martin. H–D–H recorded the song in eight sessions with the Supremes and session band the Funk Brothers before settling on a version deemed suitable for the final release.

== Release ==
"You Keep Me Hangin' On" was the first single released from the Supremes' tenth studio album The Supremes Sing Holland–Dozier–Holland (1967). The song became the group's eighth number-one single when it topped the Billboard Hot 100 for two weeks from November 19 to 26, 1966. It was also a top 10 hit in Canada, Iceland, Malaysia, Singapore and the United Kingdom

== Critical reception ==
"You Keep Me Hangin' On" was ranked number 339 on Rolling Stone's The 500 Greatest Songs of All Time. It was voted number 43 on Detroit's 100 Greatest Songs, a Detroit Free Press poll in 2016. Billboard described the song as a "pulsating rocker with the trio in top form" with an "interesting, driving guitar figure throughout." Cash Box said that it is "another in [the Supremes'] long-line of strong 'Detroit' offerings" that "is bound to follow in footsteps of the group’s previous winners." Record World described it as "a driving nifty with distinctive sound."

"You Keep Me Hangin' On" is one of the most often covered songs in the Supremes canon. The group performed the song on the ABC variety program The Hollywood Palace on October 29, 1966. In 1999, the single was inducted into the Grammy Hall of Fame.

== Personnel ==
- Diana Ross – lead vocals
- Florence Ballard – backing vocals
- Mary Wilson – backing vocals
- The Funk Brothers – instrumental accompaniment

== Charts ==
=== Weekly charts ===
Chart (1966–1967)	Peak position
Australia (Go-Set)	27
Australia (Kent Music Report)	29
Belgium (Ultratop 50 Wallonia)	12
Canada Top Singles (RPM)	3
Iceland (Íslenski Listinn)	9
Ireland (IRMA)	16
Malaysia (Billboard)	9
Netherlands (Dutch Top 40)	26
New Zealand (Listener)	18
Singapore (Billboard)	2
UK Singles (Official Charts)	8
UK R&B (Record Mirror)	1
US Billboard Hot 100	1
US Hot R&B/Hip-Hop Songs (Billboard)	1
US Cash Box Top 100	1
US Cash Box R&B	2
US Record World 100 Top Pops	1
US Record World Top 50 R&B	1

Chart (1986)	Peak position
UK Singles (Official Charts)	91

Chart (2010)	Peak position
Norway (VG-lista) Superstars feat. The Supremes	8

== Sales ==
Region	Certification	Certified units/sales
United States	—	1,000,000

== Certifications ==
Region	Certification	Certified units/sales
United Kingdom (BPI)	Silver	200,000^{‡}
^{‡} Sales+streaming figures based on certification alone.

== Vanilla Fudge version ==
"You Keep Me Hanging On"
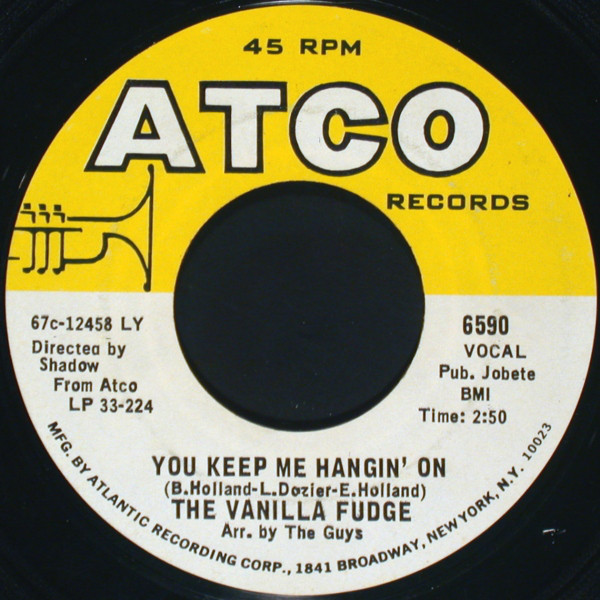

Single by Vanilla Fudge

from the album Vanilla Fudge
- B-side: "Take Me for a Little While"
- Released: June 1967
- Recorded: 1967
- Genre: Psychedelic rock; acid rock; progressive rock
- Length: 2:50 (single edit); 7:26 (album version)
- Label: Atco
- Songwriter: Holland-Dozier-Holland
- Producer: Shadow Morton

Vanilla Fudge singles chronology
"You Keep Me Hanging On" (1967)	"Eleanor Rigby" (1967)

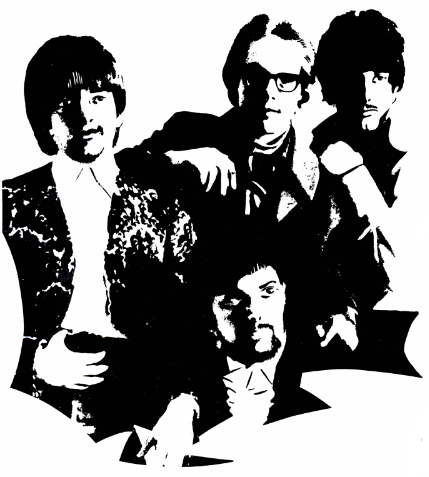
Vanilla Fudge (1968)

=== Background ===
In 1967, the American rock band Vanilla Fudge included a psychedelic rock cover of "You Keep Me Hanging On" on their self-titled debut album. The recording, done in one take, is a slower and more aggressive take on the song. While the album version is seven minutes and 26 seconds, the edited version released as Vanilla Fudge's debut single is under three minutes. It reached number six on the Billboard Hot 100, a year after the release of the Supremes' recording.

Vanilla Fudge drummer Carmine Appice talked about the band's decision to record the song in a 2014 interview:

That was Mark and Timmy [the band's keyboardist and bassist]. We used to slow songs down and listen to the lyrics and try to emulate what the lyrics were dictating. That one was a hurtin' song; it had a lot of emotion in it. "People Get Ready" was like a Gospel thing. "Eleanor Rigby" was sort of eerie and church-like ... like a horror movie kind of thing. If you listen to "Hangin' On" fast ... by the Supremes, it sounds very happy, but the lyrics aren't happy at all. If you lived through that situation, the lyrics are definitely not happy.

The Vanilla Fudge version appears in the series finale of the television show The Sopranos (2007), at the conclusion of episode 1 of season 7 of the television series Mad Men (2015), the film War Dogs (2016), the video game Mafia III (2016), the film Once Upon a Time in Hollywood (2019) and its soundtrack, and over the closing credits of the "Intervention" (2022) episode of That Damn Michael Che. It Also appears in the snowboarding film by Burton "One World" (2020).

=== Personnel ===
- Carmine Appice – drums, vocals
- Tim Bogert – bass, vocals
- Vince Martell – guitar, vocals
- Mark Stein – lead vocals, keyboards

=== Charts ===
Chart (1967–1968)	Peak position
Belgium (Ultratop 50 Wallonia)	50
Netherlands (Dutch Top 40)	13
New Zealand (Listener)	13
Netherlands (Single Top 100)	11
UK Singles (Official Charts)	18
US Billboard Hot 100	6

== Kim Wilde version ==
"You Keep Me Hangin' On"
- 7-inch vinyl variant of the standard cover; the North American variant used different colours

Single by Kim Wilde

from the album Another Step
- B-side: "Loving You"
- Released: September 19, 1986
- Recorded: 1986
- Studio: Westlake, Los Angeles
- Genre: Hi-NRG; dance-pop
- Length: 4:15
- Label: MCA
- Songwriter: Holland-Dozier-Holland
- Producer: Ricky Wilde

Kim Wilde singles chronology
"Say You Really Want Me" (1986)	"You Keep Me Hangin' On" (1986)	"Another Step (Closer to You)" (1987)

Music video
- "You Keep Me Hangin' On" on YouTube

=== Background ===
"You Keep Me Hangin' On" was covered by English singer Kim Wilde in 1986. Wilde's version was a total re-working of the original, completely transforming the Supremes' Motown Sound into a hi-NRG song. On December 6, 1986, Wilde performed the song on Peter's Popshow.

=== Reception ===
It was released as the second single from Wilde's fifth studio album, Another Step (although "You Keep Me Hangin' On" was the LP's first worldwide single, as the first single had been released only in selected countries). The song reached number two in Wilde's native United Kingdom, and number one in Australia. It also became Wilde's second and last top-40 entry in the United States following "Kids in America" (1981), as well as her most successful song in that country to date, reaching number one on the Billboard Hot 100 chart for one week in June 1987. It later ranked as the 34th best-selling song of 1987 on Billboard's Hot 100 year-end chart that year. "You Keep Me Hangin' On" was certified silver by the British Phonographic Industry (BPI) for UK sales in excess of 250,000 copies.

In 2006, Wilde performed a new version of the song with German singer Nena for her Never Say Never album.

=== Music video ===
Wilde filmed a music video to promote the song. Directed by Greg Masuak, the video shows Wilde in a dark room lying on a large bed. She then rises from the bed as she sings the song and finds herself being "threatened" by a strange man who is breaking down the walls around her.

=== Charts ===
==== Weekly charts ====
Chart (1986–1987)	Peak position
Australia (Kent Music Report)	1
Austria (Ö3 Austria Top 40)	20
Belgium (Ultratop 50 Flanders)	16
Canada (The Record)	1
Canada Top Singles (RPM)	1
Denmark (Tracklisten)	3
Europe (European Hot 100 Singles)	3
France (SNEP)	6
Ireland (IRMA)	2
Luxembourg (Radio Luxembourg)	3
Netherlands (Dutch Top 40)	17
Netherlands (Single Top 100)	17
New Zealand (Recorded Music NZ)	12
Norway (VG-lista)	1
Portugal (AFP)	9
Switzerland (Schweizer Hitparade)	2
UK Singles (Official Charts)	2
US Billboard Hot 100	1
US Adult Contemporary (Billboard)	30
US Dance Club Songs (Billboard)	6
US Dance Singles Sales (Billboard)	5
US Cash Box Top 100	2
West Germany (GfK)	8

==== Year-end charts ====
Chart (1986)	Position
UK Singles (OCC)	34

Chart (1987)	Position
Australia (Australian Music Report)	6
Canada Top Singles (RPM)	24
US Billboard Hot 100	34
US Hot Crossover Singles (Billboard)	21
US Dance Singles Sales (Billboard)	12
US Cash Box Top 100	17

=== Certifications ===
Region	Certification	Certified units/sales
Canada (Music Canada)	Gold	50,000^{^}
United Kingdom (BPI)	Silver	250,000
^{^} Shipments figures based on certification alone.

== Reba McEntire version ==
"You Keep Me Hangin' On"

Single by Reba McEntire

from the album Starting Over
- Released: April 1996
- Genre: Dance
- Length: 3:44
- Label: MCA
- Songwriter: Holland–Dozier–Holland

Reba McEntire singles chronology
"Starting Over Again" (1996)	"You Keep Me Hangin' On" (1996)	"The Fear of Being Alone" (1996)

American country singer Reba McEntire covered "You Keep Me Hangin' On" in 1995 for her 22nd studio album Starting Over (1996). Released as the album's fourth single in 1996 on MCA Nashville Records, it was co-produced by Tony Brown and Michael Omartian. Although not released to country radio, McEntire's rendition was her only dance hit, reaching number two on the US Billboard Hot Dance Club Play chart.

=== Reception ===
Larry Flick from Billboard wrote, "A Reba McEntire dance record? On paper, such an idea seems frighteningly incongruous. But in the hands of British production team Love to Infinity, the concept works like gangbusters. Playfully digging into the Supremes' pop classic, McEntire has a saucy style that is well-suited to the track's storm of bright pop/house percussion and sugary synths. Her country base may find this a tad hard to swallow, but it is so darn good that you'll be wishing for another romp in the disco round ASAP." Dan Glaister from The Guardian said songs like "You Keep Me Hanging On" are "safe, solid, and destined for a marketing megablitz. They're huge, but hardly country."

=== Track listing ===
- 12-inch vinyl, 1996 (US)

A1. "You Keep Me Hangin' On" (Classic Paradise mix) – 7:46
A2. "You Keep Me Hangin' On" (Classic Paradise instrumental) – 7:47
B1. "You Keep Me Hangin' On" (Deep Love mix) – 8:55
B2. "You Keep Me Hangin' On" (Aphrodisiac mix) – 7:12

- CD maxi-single, 1996 (US)
1. "You Keep Me Hangin' On" (Classic Paradise radio mix) – 3:44
2. "You Keep Me Hangin' On" (Classic Paradise mix) – 7:46
3. "You Keep Me Hangin' On" (Classic Paradise instrumental) – 7:47
4. "You Keep Me Hangin' On" (Deep Love mix) – 8:55
5. "You Keep Me Hangin' On" (Aphrodisiac mix) – 7:12

=== Charts ===
Chart (1996)	Peak position
US Hot Dance Club Play (Billboard)	2

== Other notable versions ==
In 1969, Mary McCaslin released a cover version. According to The New York Times, it "transforms the tune from an urban teen-oriented lament into a mountain-flavored folk song of quiet, adult desperation."

R&B singer Wilson Pickett recorded a version of the Vanilla Fudge cover which was released as a single in 1969 and included on his 1970 album Right On. Pickett's version reached number 16 on the US R&B chart and 92 on the Billboard Hot 100.

Rod Stewart recorded a version on his 1977 album “Footloose and Fancy Free” with Holland/Dozier/Holland listed as writers.

English DJ and producer Mark Ronson covered the Smiths' controversial 1987 hit "Stop Me If You Think You've Heard This One Before" under the shortened title of "Stop Me" featuring Australian singer and frequent collaborator Daniel Merriweather for his 2007 album of cover versions, Version, and was released as the album's lead single in the weeks up to its release and was a hit throughout the US and Europe. Ronson and Merriweather's version contains additional lyrics from "You Keep Me Hangin' On", where Holland–Dozier–Holland are credited as co-writers alongside the existing co-writers of the Smiths' Morrissey and Johnny Marr.

Dianna Agron as Quinn Fabray performed the song in the Glee episode "Throwdown". Raymund Flandez for The Wall Street Journal was critical of this cover, which he called "thin and jarring", while in 2015 The A.V. Club described it as "one of the best numbers in Glee history" and Mashable ranked it in the show's top 50 songs. The version peaked at number 166 on the UK Singles Chart for the week ending February 27, 2010.

== See also ==
- List of Billboard Hot 100 number ones of 1966
- List of Billboard Hot 100 number ones of 1987
