= Mausoleum Records =

- Parent company: Music Avenue Group
- Founded: 1982
- Founder: Alfie Falckenbach
- Distributor: Music Avenue Group
- Genre: Heavy metal
- Country of origin: Belgium
- Location: Brussels

Mausoleum Records was a Belgian-based heavy metal record label, once considered by Billboard as "one of Europe's premier hard rock labels".

Alfie Falckenbach founded the Mausoleum Records label in 1982 (he also founded the Music Avenue label, and the blues label Blues Boulevard Records). Bands releasing material on the label included Anvil, Faithful Breath, Great White, Killer, L.A. Guns, Nazareth, Omen, Ostrogoth, Ian Gillan Band and Warlock. Celebrating its 30th anniversary this year, Mausoleum Records was still going strong, and the artist roster consisted of established acts such as Molly Hatchet and Cinderella, in addition to new artists from around the world, including Hyades (Italy), Always Fallen (Belgium), Hills of Kings (Germany), Awaken (USA) and Grenouer (Russia).

The label folded upon Falckenbach's death in 2016.

== Recording artists ==
- Ace Lane
- Achyronthia
- Adam Bomb
- After All
- Always Fallen
- Andralls
- Angel Witch
- Anvil
- Arrest
- Atlain
- Awaken
- Axe Victims
- Bad Steve
- Barón Rojo
- Beast
- Belladonna
- Blacklace
- Bloody Six
- Brainfever
- Ceremony
- Chariot
- Chasar
- Chinawhite
- Cinderella
- Courageous
- Crackmind
- Crossfire
- Crucifixion
- Custard
- Cutty Sark
- Danger
- Dark Wizard
- Darxon
- Dead On
- Donor
- Double Diamond
- Dygitals
- E.F. Band
- E-Force
- Ekpyrosis
- Electric Earth
- Enertia
- Even Vast
- Everfest
- Expect No Mercy
- Fact
- Faithful Breath
- Fisc
- Flotsam and Jetsam
- Frost
- The Ghost Next Door
- GMT
- Godiva
- Graveshadow
- Grenouer
- Gust of Anger
- Hades
- Hardline
- Hawkwind
- Hazzard
- Herman Rarebell
- Hermetic Brotherhood
- Highway Chile
- Hirax
- Hollywood Monsters
- Human Factor
- Hyades
- Imagika
- Imago Mortis
- Jerusalem
- K-West
- Killer
- Killing Machine
- King Karma
- Kirk
- Kyrbgrinder
- L.A. Guns
- Legen Beltza
- Limelight
- Lion's Pride
- Living Death
- Mad Axeman
- Magic Kingdom
- Maggie's Madness
- Max Pie
- McCoy
- Megasonic
- Merendine Atomiche
- Molly Hatchet
- Mystery Blue
- Native Instinct
- Necromancia
- Nitro
- Nordheim
- Obsession
- Obus
- Omen
- Ostrogoth
- Panzer
- Phantom-X
- Prey
- Raven Lord
- Reaper
- Reign
- Richie Kotzen
- Rise to Addiction
- Rivera/Bomma
- Rough Silk
- Runamok
- Saints' Anger
- Scavenger
- Schubert
- Sergeant
- Sinner
- Sledgehammer
- Snowblind
- Sphinx
- Spirit Web
- Starstruck
- Steeler
- Steelover
- Steeltower
- Stormbringer
- Stormhammer
- Stream
- Suicide Watch
- Swarm
- Syar
- System Shock
- Tails Blue
- Tank Buster Jack
- Technocracy
- The Ordeal
- Together
- Torch
- Tormentor
- Tox
- Trance
- TSA
- Tuff
- Tush
- Tyrant
- Underdog
- Vanadium
- Villain
- Versover
- Voivod
- Warhead
- Warlock
- Warning SF
- Waxface
- White Heat
- Wicked Maraya
- Wicked Mystic
- Wildfire
- Wolf
- Witchfynde
- Wrekking Machine
