= Tim Bogert =

American musician (1944–2021)

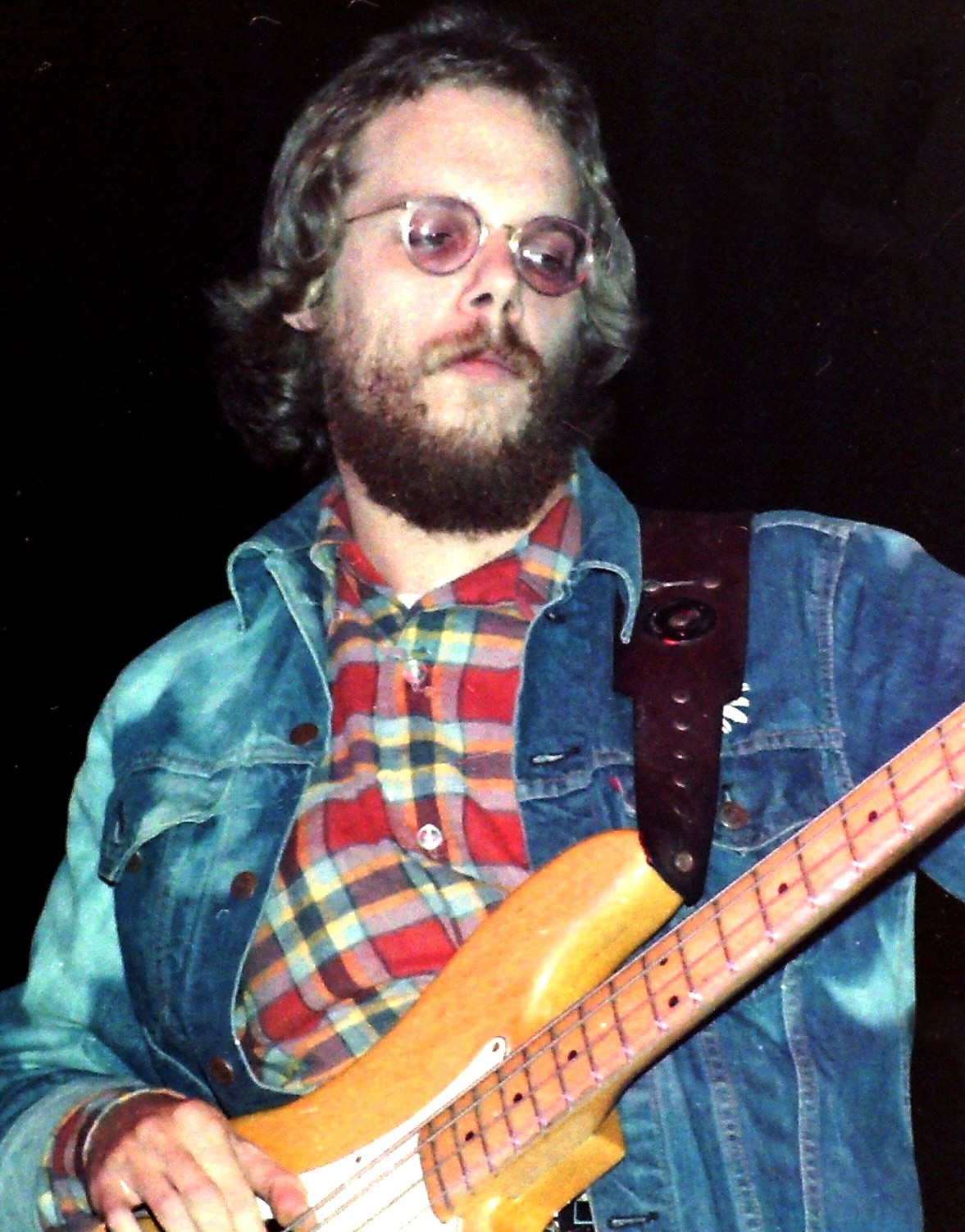
- Bogert with Beck, Bogert & Appice, 1972

Background information
- Born: John Voorhis Bogert III; August 27, 1944; New York City, New York, U.S.
- Died: January 13, 2021 (aged 76) Simi Valley, California, U.S.
- Genres: Blues rock; hard rock; psychedelic rock; heavy metal
- Occupations: Musician, songwriter
- Instruments: Bass, vocals
- Years active: 1965–2021
- Labels: Atlantic; Atco; Epic; Grooveyard Records; Repertoire
- Formerly of: Beck, Bogert & Appice; Vanilla Fudge; Cactus; Bobby and the Midnites; Pappo; Jake E. Lee; DBA; The McGrath Project; Hollywood Monsters
- Website: Tim Bogert.com

John Voorhis "Tim" Bogert III (August 27, 1944 – January 13, 2021) was an American multi-instrumentalist musician and frequent collaborator with drummer Carmine Appice; the duo performed in such bands as Vanilla Fudge, Cactus, and the power trio Beck, Bogert & Appice. As a bass guitarist and vocalist he was best known for his powerful vocal ability and his fast runs, fluid agility and ground-breaking sound on his Fender Precision Bass. He was one of the pioneers of using distortion with his bass to help it cut through the mix with the low-powered amps of his time, which also imparted a very sharp-edged sound to it.

== Early life ==
John Voorhis Bogert III was the only child born to a family of bankers, John Voorhis Jr. (1898–1984) and Christine Caroline Bach (1909–2000). He graduated in 1963 from Ridgefield Memorial High School in his hometown of Ridgefield, New Jersey.

== Career ==
=== 1960s ===
In 1965, Bogert, who was born John, chose to go by the nickname "Tim" in 1965 when his career performing on stage started.

Vanilla Fudge was formed by Tim Bogert along with Mark Stein, Vince Martell, and Carmine Appice. They recorded five albums during the years 1967–69, before disbanding in 1970. Their only hit song was a cover of "You Keep Me Hangin' On" by The Supremes. The band has reunited in various configurations over the years, with Bogert returning to the band on multiple occasions until 2010.

=== 1970s ===
In 1970, Bogert formed the hard rock band Cactus with drummer Carmine Appice, guitarist Jim McCarty and lead vocalist Rusty Day. He then played with guitarist Jeff Beck, after the second Jeff Beck Group had disbanded in 1972 and eventually became a member of the power trio Beck, Bogert & Appice, late in 1972. As a member of the post-second Jeff Beck Group, also known as Jeff Beck Group, he toured Europe, Japan and the U.S. from January 1972 until January 1974. In late 1975, he played bass guitar on Bo Diddley's The 20th Anniversary of Rock 'n' Roll all-star album.

Bogert then joined up with Bobby and the Midnites, a musical side project assembled by guitarist and vocalist Bob Weir of The Grateful Dead. Despite touring with the group, Bogert left before their eponymous album was released and was replaced by Alphonso Johnson. He then joined UK group Boxer and played on their final album "Absolutely" in 1977 – he had co-writing credits on three tracks on this album. The album and subsequent tour met with an indifferent response and the band had folded by 1978.

=== 1980s & 1990s ===
During 1981 Bogert toured with guitarist Rick Derringer and released an album Progressions. He recorded his second album Master's Brew in 1983 and recorded Mystery with Vanilla Fudge in 1984. In 1981 Bogert became a faculty member at the Musicians Institute in Hollywood. In 1993 he worked with Pata, recording the guitarist's self-titled album and joining Tommy Aldridge and James Christian on a November 1993 tour of Japan supporting the album.

In early 1999, The Hollywood Rock Walk of Fame recognised Tim Bogert's contribution to rock history. That year, he teamed up with Appice and Char to tour Japan in a unit called CB&A, with a live album released the following year. Later in 1999 Bogert worked with Triality, and Shelter Me. In 2000, Bogert and Carmine Appice formed the power trio DBA with Rick Derringer and toured with Vanilla Fudge.

=== 2000s & 2010s ===
During 2009, Bogert joined blues rock trio Blues Mobile Band and recorded Blues Without Borders (2009) in Los Angeles.

In 2010, Bogert, with Mike Onesko on guitar and vocals and Emery Ceo on drums (both from the Blindside Blues Band) recorded Big Electric Cream Jam, a 10-track live tribute to Cream Live at The Beachland Ballroom Euclid Ohio.

Tim Bogert was a part of the then Los Angeles–based The McGrath Project, featuring Gary McGrath (Grammy Award–winning producer), Chet McCracken (Doobie Brothers and America), Dean Minnerly (Three Dog Night and Aretha Franklin touring member) and Ann-Marita. They did three records, self-titled, “Love is a Four-Letter Word” and “Phoenix” released under 4818 Records.

In early 2014, Bogert joined hard rock band Hollywood Monsters, where he played on the album Big Trouble (on three tracks) which was released in 2014 on Mausoleum Records. The album features Steph Honde on vocals and guitars, Vinny Appice (Carmine's brother) on drums, Don Airey on keyboards (on one track) and Paul Di'Anno on lead vocals on the bonus track.

== Personal life and death ==
Bogert located to California in the 1980s where he remained until he died.

In 2010, Bogert "reluctantly" retired from touring due to a motorcycle accident. He died on January 13, 2021, from cancer. He is survived by his wife, Veda Vaughn Bogert, and their only child John Voorhis Bogert IV, who's known by the name "Freddy". Tributes were made by Carmine Appice and Paul Stanley of Kiss.

== Legacy ==
Bogert has been listed as an important influence on other renowned rock bassists. In 2025, Billy Sheehan called him "probably the biggest influence on me bass-wise" and said "He just had a take on it that was unlike anyone else, and he just created this integral melodic move that was reminiscent of Motown, only way wilder."

== Discography ==
=== Solo ===
- Progressions (1981)
- Master's Brew (1983)

=== With Vanilla Fudge ===
- Vanilla Fudge (1967)
- The Beat Goes On (1968)
- Renaissance (1968)
- Near the Beginning (1969)
- Rock & Roll (1969)
- Mystery (1984)
- The Return (2002)
- Out Through the In Door (2007)

=== With Beck, Bogert & Appice ===
- Beck, Bogert & Appice (1973)
- Beck, Bogert & Appice Live (in Japan) (1973)

=== With Cactus ===
- Cactus (1970)
- One Way... or Another (1971)
- Restrictions (1971)
- 'Ot 'N' Sweaty (1972)
- Cactus V (2006)
