= Vince Martell =

American guitarist

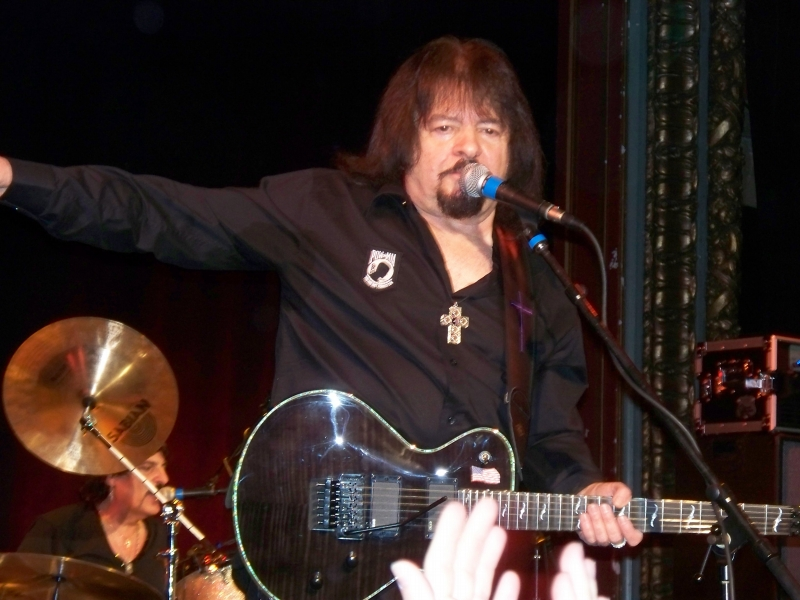
- Martell performing at the Regent Theater in Arlington, Massachusetts on March 26, 2011

Background information
- Born: November 11, 1945 (age 81); New York City, New York, U.S.
- Genres: Hard rock, psychedelic rock, rock and roll, blue-eyed soul
- Occupation: Musician
- Instruments: Guitar, vocals
- Years active: 1966–present
- Labels: Rhino, Atco, Spectra
- Website: Official Vince Martell web site

Vince Martell (born Vincent James Martemucci, November 11, 1945) is an American guitarist best known as the lead guitarist for Vanilla Fudge.

== Early life ==
Martell was born in the Bronx to parents who played the guitar and encouraged him to play as well. He comes from an Italian American family. While in his teens, Martell joined the Navy, where he discovered his skills as a guitarist. Martell first played classical and jazz on the guitar, switched to rock and roll in the late '50s, learning how to play "Honky Tonk", "Hideaway", "Green Onions" and other rock and roll standard songs.

== Career ==
=== 1960s–1980s ===
In 1963, Martell moved with his family to Florida and soon joined a band called Ricky T & The Satans Three that played in Miami blues clubs and bars in Key West. In 1966, he formed the band The Pigeons with organist Mark Stein, bassist Tim Bogert and drummer Joe Brennan. After Brennan was replaced by Carmine Appice and a record deal forced the band to change its name, the band became Vanilla Fudge.

After the breakup of Vanilla Fudge in 1970, Martell continued to perform until Vanilla Fudge reunited for another album in 1984 called Mystery.

=== 2000s–present ===
In 2000, he released his first solo CD, Endless High, followed in 2001 by a self-titled CD, Vince Martell. In 2002, he recorded a third solo CD as a tribute to Jimi Hendrix, whom Martell had befriended when Vanilla Fudge and Hendrix toured together. In 2005, Vanilla Fudge reformed with all the original members including Martell, Mark Stein, Tim Bogert and Carmine Appice, for a tour with The Doors and Steppenwolf. In July 2006, Vanilla Fudge recorded a tribute to Led Zeppelin, Out Through the in Door.

Vince along with fellow original members Bogert, Stein and Appice opened for Deep Purple (at the band's request) on August 7, 2007 at Radio City Music Hall, continuing to tour in this lineup in early 2008. As of 2023, Martell continues to tour with Vanilla Fudge, and his own band, the Vince Martell Band with Peg Pearl (keyboards/vocals), Pete Bremy (Bass/vocals), Russ T. Blades (drums) and TigerBill Meligari (drums).

== Personal life ==
Martell was raised Catholic and still identifies with the religion. He is married to Peg Pearl, who is also a musician.

== Discography ==
=== Vanilla Fudge ===
- 1967: Vanilla Fudge
- 1968: The Beat Goes On
- 1968: Renaissance
- 1969: Near the Beginning
- 1970: Rock & Roll
- 1984: Mystery
- 2000: The Return / Then And Now
- 2005: Out Through The In Door

=== Solo ===
- 2000: Endless High
- 2001: Vince Martell: Lead Guitarist of Vanilla Fudge
- 2002: Pyschedlic Cymbals
- 2009: Vince Martell – Comin' to Get Ya
