= Vanilla Fudge =

American rock band

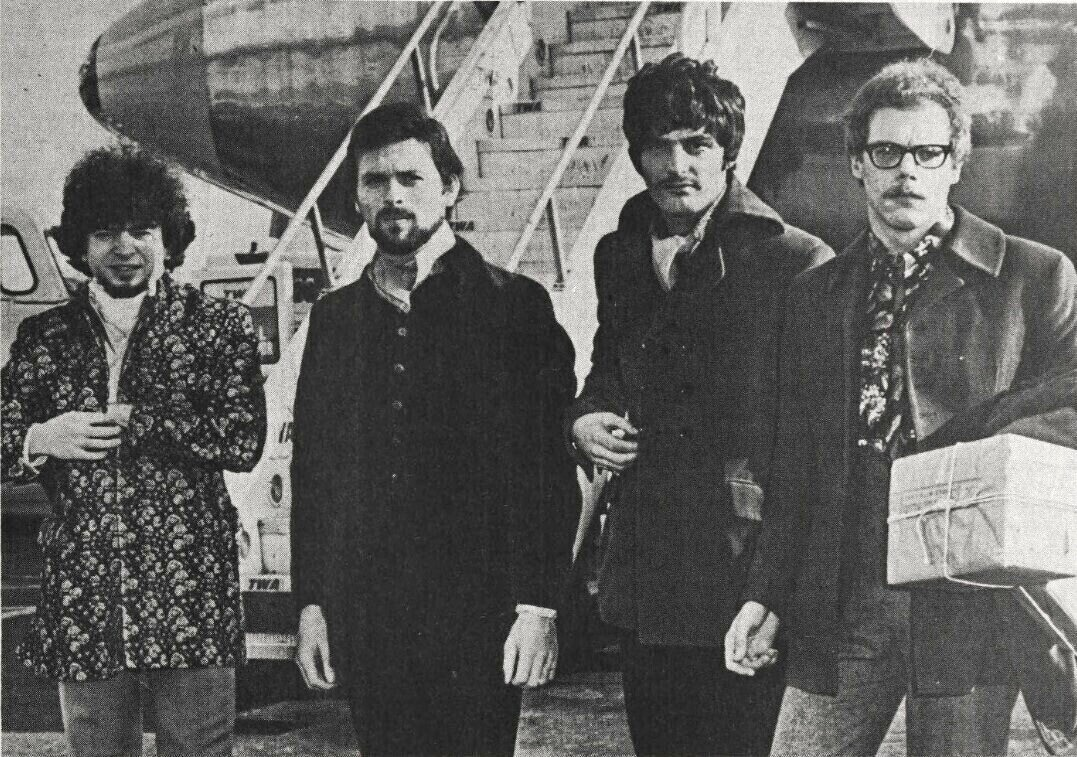
- Vanilla Fudge in early 1968. From left: Vince Martell, Mark Stein, Carmine Appice, Tim Bogert

Background information
- Origin: Long Island, New York, U.S.
- Genres: Psychedelic rock; acid rock; hard rock; proto-prog
- Years active: 1967–1970; 1982–1984; 1987–1988; 1991; 1999–present
- Labels: Atco; Rhino; WorldSound; Escapi; Cleopatra; Golden Robot Records
- Members: Mark Stein; Vince Martell; Carmine Appice; Pete Bremy
- Past members: Tim Bogert
- Website: vanillafudge.com

Vanilla Fudge is an American rock band from New York City formed in 1966 and originally active until 1970, during which time they released five albums. They became known for their hard rock arrangements of contemporary pop songs, particularly with their cover of "You Keep Me Hangin' On", a Motown song originally recorded by the Supremes, which became a hit single in 1968. After occasional reunions during the 1980s and early 1990s, the band reformed full time in 1999.

The group's foundational lineup remained consistent during 1967–1970, comprising vocalist/organist Mark Stein and bassist/vocalist Tim Bogert, who left another band to form The Pigeons (later renamed Vanilla Fudge), guitarist/vocalist Vince Martell, and drummer/vocalist Carmine Appice. Bogert retired from live music in 2010, whereafter Pete Bremy joined on bass; Bogert died from cancer in 2021. "The Fudge", as members call the group, with Stein, Martell, Appice, and Bremy, have scheduled concerts for September and October 2026.

Vanilla Fudge has been cited as "one of the few American links between psychedelia and what soon became heavy metal" and as a proto-prog band.

== History ==
Mark Stein and Tim Bogert had played in a local band called Rick Martin & the Showmen. The pair were so impressed by the swinging, organ-heavy sound of the Rascals they decided to form their own band in 1965 with Martell and Rick Martin's drummer, Mark Dolfen, who was quickly replaced by Joey Brennan. Originally calling themselves the Electric Pigeons, they soon shortened the name to the Pigeons. In December 1966, Brennan moved on to the Younger Brothers Band and Bogert became impressed with a young drummer named Carmine Appice he had heard playing at the Headliner Club on 43rd Street in a cover band called Thursday's Children. Appice was asked to join the Pigeons and in his 2016 autobiography, Stick It!, Carmine explained the name change to 'Vanilla Fudge':

In April 1967 the Pigeons got signed to Atlantic Records. But there was one drawback, however: Atlantic didn't want to sign a band called the Pigeons. Ahmet Ertegun, the label's founder and president, didn't like that name and told us we had to change it. We didn't mind, in fact, I had always thought the Pigeons was a weird thing to be called but had just gone with it. We tried to think up a new name but were getting nowhere until we played a gig at the Page 2 club on Long Island and ended up talking to a chick named Dee Dee who worked there. She told us how her grandfather used to call her Vanilla Fudge. Then she looked at us and added "Maybe you guys should call yourselves that—you're like white soul music". We liked it. We told our manager, Phil Basile. He liked it. We told Atlantic and they liked it, too. So Vanilla Fudge it was.

A recording of the Pigeons, "While the World Was Eating Vanilla Fudge", was released by Scepter/Wand in 1970.

Vanilla Fudge was managed by Phillip Basile, a reputed Lucchese crime family member, who operated several popular clubs in New York. Their first three albums (Vanilla Fudge, The Beat Goes On, and Renaissance) were produced by Shadow Morton, whom the band met through the Rascals. When Led Zeppelin first toured the United States in early 1969, they opened for Vanilla Fudge on some shows.

The band's biggest hit was its cover of "You Keep Me Hangin' On," a slowed-down, hard rocking version of a song originally recorded by the Supremes. This version featured Stein's psychedelic-baroque organ intro and Appice's energetic drumming. It was a Top 10 hit in Canada, the United States, and Australia, and a Top 20 hit in the UK in 1967.

The members of Vanilla Fudge were great admirers of the Beatles, and covered several of their songs including "Ticket to Ride", "Eleanor Rigby", and "You Can't Do That". Their debut album quotes "Strawberry Fields Forever" at the end, with the lines "Nothing is real; Nothing to get hung about".

According to Ritchie Blackmore and Jon Lord, Vanilla Fudge's organ-heavy sound was a large influence on the British band Deep Purple, with Blackmore even stating that his band wanted to be a "Vanilla Fudge clone" in its early years.

=== Breakup and reunions ===
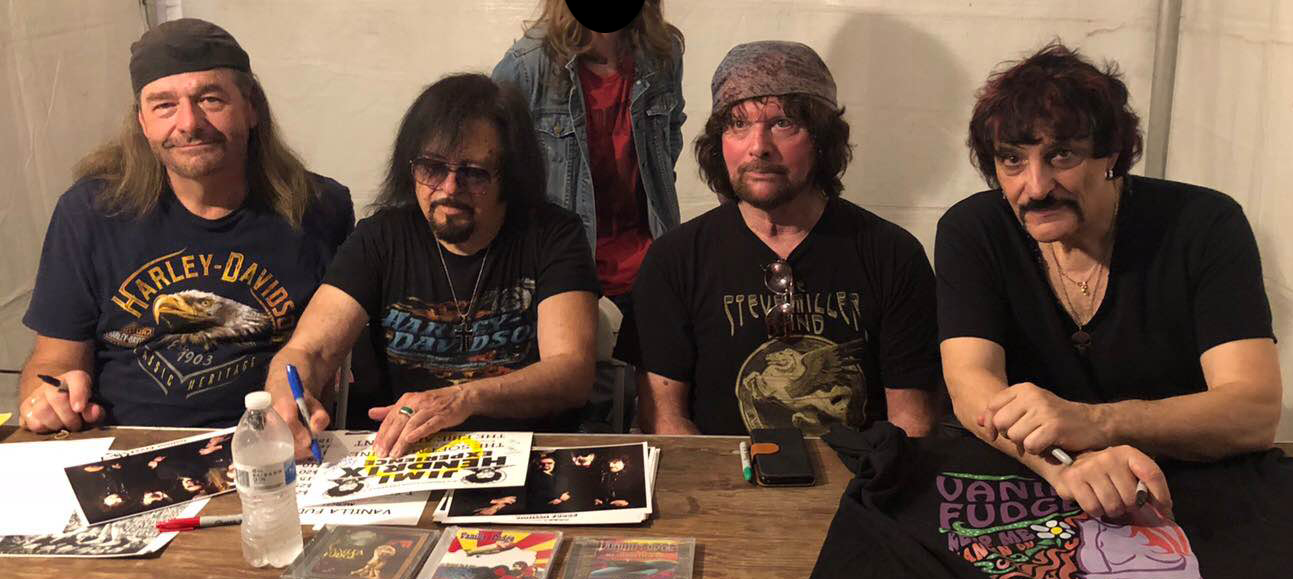
Vanilla Fudge in 2018. L to R: Pete Bremy, Vince Martell, Mark Stein, Carmine Appice

Vanilla Fudge played a farewell concert at the Phil Basile's Action House on March 14, 1970. After that, Bogert and Appice departed to form another group, Cactus, that they had been planning since late 1969. They ended up leaving Cactus and formed Beck, Bogert & Appice with guitarist Jeff Beck in 1972. Stein, left on his own, tried to keep Vanilla Fudge afloat with two new players, Sal D'Nofrio (bass) and Jimmy Galluzi (drums), both of whom had been members of a Poughkeepsie, New York, group known as the Dirty Elbows. But when nothing came from this, Stein ended up forming a new group, Boomerang, with Galluzi.

Since the band's breakup in 1970, Vanilla Fudge has reunited several times. They reunited in support of the Atco Records release Best of Vanilla Fudge in 1982. This resulted in Mystery, another album of new material, released in 1984. Martell was not included in this initial reunion and Ron Mancuso played guitar on Mystery instead, along with Jeff Beck, who guested under the moniker "J. Toad". Two reunion tours followed in 1987/1988, with Paul Hanson on guitar. Lanny Cordola was guitarist when the band took the stage on May 14, 1988, for Atlantic Records' 40th anniversary celebration. After that, band members went their own ways once again to pursue separate projects.

In 1991, Appice revived the Vanilla Fudge name for a tour with Ted Nugent's former band members Derek St. Holmes (guitar, vocals), Martin Gerschwitz (keyboards, vocals), and Tom Croucier (bass, vocals), which resulted in the album The Best of Vanilla Fudge – Live.

Three of the original members, Appice, Bogert, and Martell, reunited in 1999 with vocalist/organist Bill Pascali replacing Mark Stein to record a "greatest hits" album, The Return / Then And Now (2001), with new recordings of previous songs and three new songs. 2002 had Pete Bremy and T. M. Stevens subbing on bass for an ill Bogert and 2003 saw a release of Vanilla Fudge's live album, The Real Deal – Vanilla Fudge Live, recorded on tour in 1987 with Paul Hanson on guitar. Martell overdubbed his guitar and vocals later. In 2003–2005, the group toured with Teddy Rondinelli standing in on guitar for Martell.

In 2005, all four original Vanilla Fudge members reunited for a tour with members of the Doors (touring as Riders on the Storm) and Steppenwolf. Pascali returned in place of Stein for some 2005 and 2006 shows before leaving to join the New Rascals. Vanilla Fudge was inducted into the Long Island Music Hall of Fame on October 15, 2006, with Billy Joel, Joan Jett, and producer Shadow Morton. Fellow Long Islander Felix Cavaliere of the Rascals inducted them.

In the summer of 2007, HBO's final episode of The Sopranos featured "You Keep Me Hangin' On" (with Pascali's lead vocals) as a theme for their cliffhanger. The band also went back into the studio to record Out Through the In Door, a Led Zeppelin cover album released in 2007 only in Europe. Also, the band (Stein & Martell with Steve Argy on bass and Jimmyjack Tamburo on drums) performed "You Keep Me Hangin' On" for the PBS fundraising program My Music: My Generation – The '60s for the March 2008 pledge drive.

In March 2008, the original lineup of Vanilla Fudge embarked on a tour of the United States (mostly in New England). But in the summer of that year, Bogert and Appice left to concentrate on Cactus, which they had reformed in 2006. Stein and Martell continued on in 2008 and 2009 as Mark Stein and Vince Martell of Vanilla Fudge with a tour that was called "Let's Pray For Peace," with Jimmyjack Tamburo on drums and Pete Bremy returning on bass. Out Through the In Door was released in the US in 2008. Stein and Martell also performed shows during this period with Steve Argy and Jimmyjack Tamburo again as the rhythm section.

In 2010 Tim Bogert announced his retirement from touring and was replaced by Pete Bremy.

In early 2011, Vanilla Fudge embarked on what was announced as their farewell tour. The lineup for the tour included Carmine Appice, Mark Stein, Vince Martell, and Pete Bremy (bass). On March 29, 2011, the band appeared on Late Night with Jimmy Fallon and performed "You Keep Me Hangin' On". This lineup has continued to tour since.

In 2015 Vanilla Fudge released its first album in ten years, Spirit of '67.

As of 2021, Vanilla Fudge was still performing concerts regularly. On January 13, 2021, Tim Bogert died at the age of 76 after a long battle with cancer. The band did release (on September 6, 2021) a cover version of "Stop! in the Name of Love" as digital streaming content and with an official music video on YouTube, dedicated to Tim Bogert.

== Personnel ==
=== Current members ===
- Mark Stein – lead vocals, keyboards (1966–1970, 1982–1984, 1987–1988, 2005, 2006–present)
- Vince Martell – guitar, vocals (1966–1970, 1982–1984 (guest), 1999–2003, 2005–present)
- Carmine Appice – drums, vocals (1966–1970, 1982–1984, 1987–1988, 1991, 1999–2008, 2009–present)
- Pete Bremy – bass, vocals (2002, 2010–present)

=== Former members ===
- Tim Bogert – bass, vocals (1966–1970, 1982–1984, 1987–1988, 1999–2002, 2003–2008, 2009–2010, died 2021)
- Ron Mancuso – guitars (1982–1984)
- Paul Hanson – guitar, vocals (1987–1988)
- Lanny Cordola – guitar, vocals (1988)
- Derek St. Holmes – lead vocals, guitar (1991)
- Teddy Rondinelli – guitar, vocals (2003–2005)
- Martin Gerschwitz – keyboards, vocals (1991)
- Bill Pascali – lead vocals, keyboards (1999–2005, 2005–2006)
- T.M. Stevens – bass (2002; died 2024)
- Joe Brennan – drums, vocals (1966)
- Mark Dolfen – drums, vocals (1966–1967)
- Jimmyjack Tamburo – drums, vocals (2008–2009)
- Steve Argy – bass, vocals (2008–2009)
- Jack Corcoran – bass (2021)

== Discography ==
=== Studio albums ===
Title	Year	Peak chart positions					Certifications
Title	Year	US	AUS	CAN	GER	UK	Certifications
Vanilla Fudge	1967	6	—	12	—	31	RIAA: Gold
The Beat Goes On	1968	17	—	—	31	—	
Renaissance	1968	20	32	—	—	—	
Near the Beginning	1969	16	—	10	—	—	
Rock & Roll	1969	34	—	24	—	—	
Mystery	1984	—	—	—	—	—	
The Return	2002	—	—	—	—	—	
Out Through the In Door	2007	—	—	—	—	—	

=== Collections and live albums ===
- Vanilla Fudge – The Fantastic Vanilla (1969). This compilation was released as double LP in special gatefold/ poster cover and only in Italy, to celebrate the first rock band to be awarded the prestigious Golden Gondola Award.
- Best of Vanilla Fudge (1982)
- The Best of Vanilla Fudge – Live/Alive-Back on Stage/Golden Age Dreams (1991 under different titles)
- Psychedelic Sundae – The Best of Vanilla Fudge (1993)
- Then and Now (2002)
- The Return – Live in Germany Part 1 (2003)
- The Real Deal – Vanilla Fudge Live (2003)
- Rocks the Universe – Live in Germany Part 2 (2003)
- Good Good Rockin' – Live at Rockpalast (2007)
- Orchestral Fudge (live) (2008)
- When Two Worlds Collide (live) (2008)
- Box of Fudge – Rhino Handmade (2010)
- The Complete Atco Singles (2014)
- Live at Sweden Rock 2016: The 50th Anniversary (live) (2017)

=== Singles ===
Title (Note: Both sides from same LP except where indicated)	Year	Peak chart positions				Album
Title	Year	US	AUS	CAN	UK	Album
"You Keep Me Hangin' On" b/w "Take Me for a Little While"	1967	6	—	72	18	Vanilla Fudge
"Eleanor Rigby Part 1" (UK-only release) b/w "Eleanor Rigby Part 2"	1967	—	—	—	53 (Note: Chart position is from the official UK "Breakers List".)	Vanilla Fudge
"Where Is My Mind" b/w "The Look of Love" (Non-album track)	1968	73	—	—	—	The Best of Vanilla Fudge
"Season of the Witch, Pt. 1" b/w "Season of the Witch, Pt. 2"	1968	65	—	52	—	Renaissance
"You Keep Me Hangin' On" b/w "Come by Day, Come by Night" (Non-album track)	1968	6	—	2	—	Vanilla Fudge
"Shotgun" b/w "Good Good Lovin'" (Non-album track)	1968	68	—	59	—	Near the Beginning
"Take Me for a Little While" b/w "Thoughts" (from Renaissance)	1968	38	—	45	—	Vanilla Fudge
"Some Velvet Morning" b/w "People" (Non-album track)	1969	103	—	69	—	Near the Beginning
"Need Love" b/w "I Can't Make It Alone"	1969	111	—	—	—	Rock & Roll
"Lord in the Country" b/w "The Windmills of Your Mind"	1970	—	—	—	—	Rock & Roll
"Mystery" b/w "The Stranger"	1984	—	—	—	—	Mystery

== Sources ==
- Borthwick, Stuart; Moy, Ron (2004). Popular Music Genres: An Introduction. Edinburgh: Edinburgh University. ISBN 0-7486-1745-0.
- Rees, Dafydd; Crampton, Luke (1989). Rock Movers & Shakers (1st. ed). Billboard Publishing. ISBN 0-8230-7609-1.
