= Jeff Beck discography =

Musical Recordings by guitarist Jeff Beck

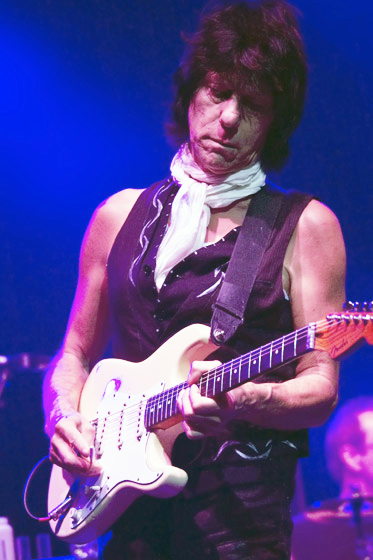
- Studio albums: 17
- Soundtrack albums: 1
- Live albums: 11
- Compilation albums: 3
- Singles: 22
- Video albums: 4

English rock guitarist Jeff Beck played with multiple groups, including the Yardbirds, the Jeff Beck Group and Beck, Bogert & Appice. He released numerous studio, live, compilation, video and soundtrack albums during his career, as well as over twenty singles.

== Albums ==
=== Studio albums ===
Title	Year	Peak chart positions										Certifications
Title	Year	UK	AUS	CAN	FRA	GER	JPN	KOR	NL	SWE	US	Certifications
Truth	1968	—	—	37	—	—	—	—	—	—	15	RIAA: Gold
Beck-Ola	1969	39	—	22	—	—	—	— (Note: Beck-Ola did not enter the Gaon Album Chart, but it peaked at number 33 on the component overseas album chart in 2014.)	—	—	15	RIAA: Gold
Rough and Ready	1971	—	—	34	—	—	56	—	—	—	46	
Jeff Beck Group	1972	—	46	15	—	—	—	—	—	—	19	RIAA: Gold
Beck, Bogert & Appice	1973	28	45	10	—	—	22	—	—	—	12	RIAA: Gold
Blow by Blow	1975	—	28	5	—	—	27	— (Note: Blow by Blow did not enter the Gaon Album Chart, but it peaked at number 30 on the component overseas album chart in 2010.)	—	—	4	MC: Gold; RIAA: Platinum
Wired	1976	38	17	14	—	—	7	—	—	—	16	MC: Gold; RIAA: Platinum
There & Back	1980	38	95	34	—	—	15	—	—	36	21	
Flash	1985	83	36	39	—	60	13	—	43	27	39	
Jeff Beck's Guitar Shop	1989	—	97	75	—	—	9	—	—	—	49	RIAJ: Gold
Crazy Legs	1993	—	190	—	—	—	51	—	—	—	171	
Who Else!	1999	74	—	—	—	—	19	—	—	—	99	
You Had It Coming	2001	—	—	—	123	96	14	—	—	—	110	
Jeff	2003	—	—	—	92	—	24	—	—	—	122	
Emotion & Commotion	2010	21	49	9	74	30	9	46	77	35	11	
Loud Hailer	2016	27	38	95	77	23	14	85	42	—	41	
18 (with Johnny Depp)	2022	38	—	—	—	13	—	—	—	—	185	
"—" denotes releases that did not chart.

=== Live albums ===
Title	Year	Peak chart positions							Certifications						
Title	Year	AUS	CAN	FRA	GER	JPN	KOR	US	Certifications						
Live in Japan	1973	—	—	—	—	21	—	—							
Jeff Beck with the Jan Hammer Group Live	1977	—	24	—	—	9	—	23	RIAA: Gold						
Live At BB King Blues Club	2006	—	—	—	—	—	—	—	—	—	—	—	—	—	—
Official Bootleg USA '06	2006	2007	—	—	—	—	24	—	—						
Performing This Week: Live at Ronnie Scott's	2008	10	—	160	71	15	—	—							
Live and Exclusive from the Grammy Museum	2010	—	—	—	—	144	—	—							
Rock & Roll Party: Honoring Les Paul	2011	199	—	—	96	81	—	54							
Live+	2015	169	—	—	—	34	— (Note: Live+ did not enter the Gaon Album Chart, but it peaked at number 39 on the component overseas album chart in 2015.)	148							
Live at the Hollywood Bowl	2017	—	—	—	—	38	—	—							
"—" denotes releases that did not chart.

=== Compilation albums ===
Title	Year	Peak chart positions
Title	Year	KOR
The Best of Jeff Beck (1967–69)	1985	—
Beckology	1991	—
The Best of Beckology	1992	89
Best of Beck	1995	—
"—" denotes releases that did not chart.

=== Soundtrack albums ===
Title	Year
Frankie's House (with Jed Leiber)	1992

=== Video albums ===
Title	Year	Peak chart positions	Certifications
Title	Year	JPN	Certifications
Performing This Week... Live at Ronnie Scott's	2008	15	BPI: Gold; MC: 2× Platinum; RIAA: Platinum
Rock & Roll Party: Honoring Les Paul	2011	33	MC: Platinum; RIAA: Gold
Live In Tokyo	2014	30	
Live at the Hollywood Bowl	2017	52	

== Singles ==
Year	Title	UK
1967	"Hi Ho Silver Lining"	14
1967	"Tallyman"	30
1968	"Love Is Blue (L'amour est bleu)"	23
1969	"Goo Goo Barabajagal (Love Is Hot)" (with Donovan & Jeff Beck Group)	12
1972	"Hi Ho Silver Lining" (re-issue)	17
1973	"I've Been Drinking" (with Rod Stewart)	27
1975	"She's a Woman"	―
1975	"Cause We've Ended as Lovers"	―
1975	"You Know What I Mean"	―
1976	"Come Dancing"	―
1980	"The Final Peace"	―
1982	"Hi Ho Silver Lining" (2nd re-issue)	62
1985	"Gets Us All in the End"	―
1985	"Stop, Look and Listen"	―
1985	"Ecstasy"	―
1985	"Ambitious"	―
1985	"People Get Ready" (with Rod Stewart)	49
1986	"Wild Thing"	―
1989	"Stand on It"	―
1989	"Guitar Shop" (with Terry Bozzio and Tony Hymas)	―
1993	"Manic Depression" (with Seal)	―
2014	"No Man's Land (Green Fields of France)" (with Joss Stone)	49
2022	"This Is a Song for Miss Hedy Lamarr" (with Johnny Depp)	—
2022	"Patient Number 9" (with Ozzy Osbourne)	—
2023	"A Thousand Shades" (with Ozzy Osbourne)	—
"—" denotes releases that did not chart.

== Guest appearances ==
Beck has appeared as a guest artist on many recordings, including the following:

- Donovan's 1968 album Barabajagal on the title track and "Trudi"
- The GTOs' 1969 album Permanent Damage on the tracks "Eureka Springs Garbage Lady", "Shock Treatment" and "Captain Fat's Theresa Shoes"
- Stevie Wonder's 1972 album Talking Book on the track "Lookin' for Another Pure Love"
- Badger's song "White Lady" from the 1974 album White Lady
- Stanley Clarke's 1975 album Journey to Love on the title track and "Hello Jeff"
- Narada Michael Walden's 1976 album Garden of Love Light on the track "Saint and the Rascal"
- Stanley Clarke's 1978 album Modern Man on the song "Rock 'N' Roll Jelly"
- Stanley Clarke's 1979 album I Wanna Play For You on the song "Jamaican Boy"
- Folkways Records' 1980 album Candy Band Sings Going Home (New Songs For Children & Parents)
- Cozy Powell's 1981 album Tilt on the songs "Cat Moves" and "Hot Rock"
- Rod Stewart's album Camouflage (on three tracks)
- Tina Turner's album Private Dancer
- Diana Ross's album Swept Away
- The Honeydrippers's 1984 mini album The Honeydrippers: Volume One on the songs "I Got a Woman and "Rockin' at Midnight"
- Mick Jagger's 1985 album She's the Boss, and his 1987 album Primitive Cool
- Various Artists 1986 compilation album Live! For Life on the song "I Been Down So Long" with Sting
- Malcolm McLaren's 1989 album Waltz Darling, on the tracks "House of the Blue Danube" and "Call a Wave"
- Buddy Guy's 1991 album Damn Right, I've Got the Blues on the tracks "Mustang Sally" and "Early in the Morning"
- Moodswing´s 1992 album Moodfood on the instrumental track "Skinthieves"
- Kate Bush's 1993 album The Red Shoes
- Jimi Hendrix's song "Manic Depression" from the 1993 album Stone Free: A Tribute to Jimi Hendrix with Seal
- Duff Mckagan's 1993 solo album Believe in Me on the tracks "(Fucked Up) Beyond Belief" and "Swamp Song"
- Seal's 1994 album Seal(Bring it on)
- John McLaughin's 1995 album The Promise on the song "Django"
- Instrumental version of "A Day in the Life" on the 1998 album In My Life by George Martin
- ZZ Top's 1999 release XXX on the track "Hey Mr. Millionaire"
- Beverley Craven's 2007 album Love Scenes (3 tracks)
- ZZ Top's 2016 live album Live: Greatest Hits from Around the World on the songs "Rough Boy" and "Sixteen Tons"
- Joe Cocker's Heart & Soul album on the track "I (Who Have Nothing)"
- Brian May's song "The Guv'nor" from the album Another World
- Pretenders' song "Legalise Me" from the 1999 album Viva El Amor
- Chrissie Hynde's song "Mystery Train" from the 2001 album Good Rockin' Tonight: The Legacy of Sun Records
- Roger Taylor's song "Say It's Not True" from the album Fun on Earth
- Vanilla Fudge's album Mystery (credited as J. Toad)
- Roger Waters' album Amused to Death
- Cozy Powell's album Tilt on the tracks "Cat Moves" and "Hot Rock"
- Jon Bon Jovi's solo album Blaze of Glory
- Paul Rodgers' Muddy Water Blues: A Tribute to Muddy Waters on the songs "Good Morning Little School Girl" and "I Just Want To Make Love To You"
- Morrissey's album Years of Refusal on the song "Black Cloud"
- Imelda May's album Life Love Flesh Blood on the song "Black Tears"
- The Yardbirds' 2003 album Birdland on the song "My Blind Life"
- Van Morrison's 2017 album Roll With The Punches on the tracks "Bring It On Home To Me". "Ordinary People", "Transformation", "I Can Tell"
- Ruth Lorenzo's 2018 album Loveaholic on the song "Another Day"
- Hollywood Vampire's 2019 album Rise on the song “Welcome to Bushwackers”
- Dion´s 2020 album Blues with Friends on the song "Can't Start Over Again"
- Ozzy Osbourne's 2022 album Patient Number 9 on the songs "Patient Number 9" and "A Thousand Shades"
- Van Morrison's 2023 album Accentuate The Positive on the song "Lonesome Train"
