= Hammerhead (Jeff Beck song) =

2010 instrumental by Jeff Beck

Instrumental by Jeff Beck

from the album Emotion & Commotion
- Released: 13 April 2010
- Genre: Hard rock, instrumental rock
- Length: 4:15
- Label: Atco
- Composers: Jeff Beck, Jason Rebello
- Producer: Steve Lipson

Emotion & Commotion track listing
- 10 tracks: 1. "Corpus Christi Carol"; 2. "Hammerhead"; 3. "Never Alone"; 4. "Over the Rainbow"; 5. "I Put a Spell on You"; 6. "Serene"; 7. "Lilac Wine"; 8. "Nessun Dorma"; 9. "There's No Other Me"; 10. "Elegy for Dunkirk"

"Hammerhead" is the second track from Jeff Beck's 2010 album Emotion & Commotion. The instrumental track features Beck on guitar, Jason Rebello on keyboards, Tal Wilkenfeld on bass guitar and Alessia Mattalia on drums. It was written by Beck and Rebello and was produced by Steve Lipson. It won the 2011 Grammy Award for Best Rock Instrumental Performance.

== Overview ==
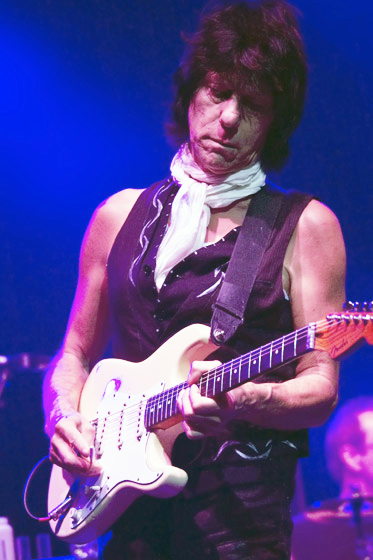
Jeff Beck playing his guitar

Beck credited composer Jan Hammer for the inspiration for the track. Whereas much of Emotion & Commotion contains orchestral accompaniment, "Hammerhead" is an uptempo rock track reminiscent of Beck's work with The Yardbirds and his 1974 album Blow by Blow. He employs wah-wah pedal and whammy bar effects on his guitar and Wilkenfeld’s bass is distorted.

== Grammy Award ==
It just proves if you keep going you just might get there

— Jeff Beck on his 2011 Grammy wins.

In February 2011 "Hammerhead" won the Grammy Award for Best Rock Instrumental Performance, he had five previous Grammy Awards in this same category. The other nominees were "Black Mud" by The Black Keys, "Do the Murray" by Los Lobos, "Kundalini Bonfire" by Dave Matthews and Tim Reynolds, and "The Deathless Horsie" by Dweezil Zappa. It was one of three awards Beck received that night also winning Best Pop Instrumental Performance for "Nessun Dorma" and Best Pop Collaboration with Vocals for his contribution to "Imagine" from Herbie Hancock's The Imagine Project.

== Personnel ==
- Jeff Beck – guitar
- Jason Rebello – keyboards
- Tal Wilkenfeld – bass
- Alessia Mattalia – drums
- Steve Lipson – producer

== Beyond original version ==
Two live versions of the song have also been commercially released. It is the second track on Beck's Live and Exclusive from the Grammy Museum. On this version drummer Narada Michael Walden and bassist Rhonda Smith join Beck and Rebello. The other live version was recorded live by Beck at the June 2010 Crossroads Guitar Festival and is available on the CD and DVD Crossroads Eric Clapton Guitar Festival 2010. He also played the tune with The Who's touring band at the Killing Cancer benefit concert at the Hammersmith Apollo on 13 January 2011.
