= 18 (Jeff Beck and Johnny Depp album) =

Studio album by Jeff Beck and Johnny Depp
- Released: 15 July 2022
- Recorded: 2019–2022
- Genre: Rock
- Length: 55:14
- Label: Rhino

Jeff Beck chronology
Loud Hailer (2016)	18 (2022)

Singles from 18
- 1. "This Is a Song for Miss Hedy Lamarr" Released: 9 June 2022

18 is a collaborative studio album by musicians Jeff Beck and Johnny Depp. Released on 15 July 2022 on Rhino Records, it is Beck's final studio album released before his death in January 2023.

The 13-track collection features two Depp-penned originals and a selection of cover songs by Killing Joke, the Beach Boys, Marvin Gaye, the Miracles, the Velvet Underground, the Everly Brothers and Janis Ian. Upon release, the album received mixed reviews from music critics.

== Background and release ==
Beck and Depp first met in 2016 and quickly got along very well, forming a close friendship. According to Beck, he found a "kindred spirit" in Depp and the two bonded over "cars and guitars and spent most of their time together trying to make each other laugh". Beck was convinced they should record music together and began to do so in 2019. Beck and Depp felt that them playing together "ignited their youthful spirit and creativity" and according to Beck, both of them would joke about how they felt 18 again, hence their decision for the album title. Depp added: "It's an extraordinary honour to play and write music with Jeff, one of the true greats and someone I am now privileged enough to call my brother." In September 2019, Depp joined Beck on stage for some concerts of the latter's US tour and they performed the song "Isolation" live for the first time.

"Isolation" would later be officially released, as Beck and Depp's debut single, on 16 April 2020. Beck said in a statement that the decision to release this song early, before finishing the album, was made due to the fact that many people were still self-quarantining amid the COVID-19 pandemic. Beck stated: "We weren't expecting to release it so soon, but given all the hard days and true 'isolation' that people are going through in these challenging times, we decided now might be the right time to let you all hear it."

On 29 May 2022, Depp, who was still awaiting a verdict in his highly publicised defamation trial against ex-wife Amber Heard, made a surprise appearance at a Jeff Beck gig in Sheffield, playing guitar along with Beck to three classic songs from Lennon, Gaye and Hendrix. Depp joined Beck for the rest of the shows in the U.K. and Europe during June and July.

On 9 June 2022, the duo released the first official single from the album, the song "This Is a Song for Miss Hedy Lamarr", which has been described as an ode to Austrian-American actress and inventor Hedy Lamarr. Ten days later, on 19 June 2022, another cover from the album was released, this time a cover of the Velvet Underground's "Venus in Furs", followed shortly by an instrumental cover of the Beach Boys' "Caroline, No" on 24 June. The last song to be released before the album's release was a cover of Killing Joke's "The Death and Resurrection Show" on 7 July 2022.

On October 5, 2022, Depp joined Beck for a joint American tour which kicked off in Washington D.C. and ended in early November.

== Songs ==
We were going to call the album 'Kitchen Sink' because we threw everything in it. The only game plan we had was to play songs we like and see where they took us. We suggested songs the other might not think of. It pushed both of us out of our comfort zones. Johnny got me excited about 'Venus In Furs,' and I persuaded him to try 'Ooo Baby Baby.' Interesting things happen when you're open to trying something different.

— Jeff Beck talking about the song selection for 18,

== Critical reception ==
Professional ratings
Aggregate scores
Source	Rating
Metacritic	47/100
Review scores
Source	Rating
AllMusic	2/5 stars
American Songwriter	3/5 stars
Classic Rock	2/5 stars
Financial Times	1/5 stars
The Independent	2/5 stars
The Guardian	2/5 stars
Rolling Stone	2.5/5 stars
The Telegraph	3/5 stars

18 received generally mixed reviews from music critics. At Metacritic, which assigns a normalised rating out of 100 to reviews from mainstream publications, the album received an average score of 47, based on 8 reviews, indicating "mixed or average reviews".

In a positive review, Doug Collette of Glide magazine wrote that the duo's alliance on 18 benefits both men creatively and otherwise. Collette found that, whilst this project has given Depp the chance to progress as a musician and vocalist, "he sounds like any fledgling musician still in the process of finding his own style."

Neil McCormick of The Telegraph felt that 18, showcases Beck's playing, who, according to McCormick, hadn't played so well in decades. He wrote that Depp is back doing what he loves, singing and playing the guitar, and in doing so, he "conjures a crunchy lyrical psychodrama about the high price of fame."

== Plagiarism allegation and lawsuit ==
In August 2022, Bruce Jackson, an American folklorist, accused Depp and Beck of stealing a toast poem titled "Hobo Ben" for the verses of the song "Sad Motherfuckin' Parade". Jackson had included the poem, as recited by Missouri State Penitentiary inmate Slim Wilson, in his book 'Get Your Ass in the Water and Swim Like Me': Narrative Poetry from Black Oral Tradition. Jackson said Depp and Beck should give due copyright credit to Wilson for the song, and also requested any profits made from sales of the album be donated to organizations that aid African Americans.

Depp and Beck sued Jackson, claiming that "Sad Motherfuckin' Parade" is an "original work of authorship and creativity" because "Hobo Ben" has uncertain authorship and was passed and shared freely within the African American community. They said Jackson had no copyright interest with respect to either "Hobo Ben" or "Sad Motherfuckin' Parade", and alleged that Jackson's accusation amounted a cash grab. Jackson responded by saying he never made any "formal financial demands" from either Depp or Beck. The lawsuit is still ongoing.

== Track listing ==
18 track listing
No.	Title	Writer(s)	Length
1.	"Midnight Walker"	Davy Spillane	3:05
2.	"Death and Resurrection Show"	Jaz Coleman; Geordie Walker; Martin Glover; Andy Gill	5:31
3.	"Time"	Dennis Wilson; Karen Lamm	3:39
4.	"Sad Motherfuckin' Parade"	Jeff Beck; Johnny Depp	3:32
5.	"Don't Talk (Put Your Head on My Shoulder)"	Brian Wilson; Tony Asher	3:12
6.	"This Is a Song for Miss Hedy Lamarr"	Depp; Tommy Henriksen	4:34
7.	"Caroline No"	Brian Wilson; Tony Asher	2:16
8.	"Ooo Baby Baby"	Warren "Pete" Moore; Smokey Robinson	3:38
9.	"What's Going On"	Renaldo Benson; Marvin Gaye; Al Cleveland	4:26
10.	"Venus in Furs"	Lou Reed	4:53
11.	"Let It Be Me"	Gilbert Bécaud; Pierre Delanoë; Manny Curtis	4:42
12.	"Stars"	Janis Ian	6:36
13.	"Isolation"	John Lennon	5:12
Total length:			55:14

== Personnel ==
- Jeff Beck – lead guitar (all tracks), rhythm guitar (tracks 8, 9, 13), acoustic guitar (track 5), bass (tracks 3, 8), drums (track 8), producer
- Johnny Depp – lead vocals (tracks 2–4, 6, 8–13), backing vocals (track 8), rhythm guitar (tracks 2, 4, 6, 10, 13), acoustic guitar (tracks 6, 10, 12), baritone guitar (track 11), bass (tracks 1, 2, 4, 6, 10–12), drums (tracks 6, 10), percussion (track 9), keyboards (track 4), producer

Additional musicians

- Vinnie Colaiuta – drums (tracks 2–4, 9, 11–13)
- Rhonda Smith – bass (tracks 7, 13)
- Pino Palladino – bass (track 9)
- Robert Adam Stevenson – keyboards (tracks 1, 3, 9, 11, 12), piano (tracks 11, 12), strings (tracks 1, 9, 11, 12)
- Tommy Henriksen – keyboards, strings (track 6)
- Ben Thomas – keyboards (track 3)
- James Pearson – keyboards (track 7)
- Jason Rebello – piano (track 3)
- Vanessa Freebairn-Smith – cello (track 1)
- Olivia Safe – vocals (track 5)

Additional personnel

- Barry Grint – mastering
- Shon Hartman – product manager
- Mike Engstrom – project manager
- Allison Boron, Hugh Gilmour, Jason Etzy, Kent Liu, Kevin Gore, Lisa Gilnes, Matthew Taoatao, Paul Bromby, Rachel Gutek, Sheryl Farber, Susanne Savage – project manager assistants
- Colin Newman – project manager supervisor
- Sandra Beck – album cover

== Charts ==
Chart performance for 18
Chart (2022)	Peak position
Austrian Albums (Ö3 Austria)	19
Belgian Albums (Ultratop Flanders)	51
Belgian Albums (Ultratop Wallonia)	47
French Albums (SNEP)	111
German Albums (Offizielle Top 100)	13
Japanese Hot Albums (Billboard Japan)	48
Scottish Albums (Official Charts)	12
Swiss Albums (Schweizer Hitparade)	3
UK Albums (Official Charts)	38
US Billboard 200	183
