= Loud Hailer =

Loud Hailer may refer to:

- Megaphone
- Loud Hailer (album)
