= Live At BB King Blues Club =

Live At BB King Blues Club may refer to:

- Live: B.B. King Blues Club & Grill, New York (Jeff Beck), released 2006, recorded in 2003
- Live at B.B. King Blues Club, a 2007 live album by The Yardbirds
