= Emotion & Commotion =

Studio album by Jeff Beck
- Released: 10 April 2010
- Genre: Instrumental rock; blues rock; soul; classical
- Length: 40:19
- Label: Atco
- Producer: Steve Lipson, Trevor Horn

Jeff Beck chronology
Jeff (2003)	Emotion & Commotion (2010)	Loud Hailer (2016)

Professional ratings
Review scores
Source	Rating
AllMusic	3.5/5 stars
Chicago Tribune	3/4 stars
The Independent	4/5 stars
Los Angeles Times	(ambivalent)
PopMatters	7/10 stars

Emotion & Commotion is the tenth studio album by guitarist Jeff Beck, released in April 2010 on Atco Records. In addition to featuring vocal performances by Joss Stone, Imelda May, and Olivia Safe, the album showcases a 64-piece orchestra on several tracks, and includes covers of well-known songs such as "Over the Rainbow", "Corpus Christi Carol", "Lilac Wine", and other rock and classical works.

== Chart performance ==
The album debuted at No. 11 on the Billboard 200 in the US, with sales of 26,000, Beck's highest debut in his 45-year career. His highest-charting album is Blow by Blow produced by George Martin, which peaked at No. 4 in 1975 on the US Billboard album chart. The album has sold 123,000 copies in the US as of July 2016.

The album reached No. 21 in the UK and debuted at No. 9 in Canada. The album debuted at No. 1 in Japan on the Weekly International Album Sales Chart. It charted at No. 49 on the Australian charts, marking the first time Jeff Beck has appeared on the Australian album charts since Jeff Beck's Guitar Shop reached No. 99 in 1989.

The song "Hammerhead" won the 2011 Grammy Award for Best Rock Instrumental Performance. The track "Nessun Dorma" won a Grammy Award for Best Pop Instrumental Performance.

== Track listing ==
No.	Title	Writer(s)	Length
1.	"Corpus Christi Carol"	Benjamin Britten	2:40
2.	"Hammerhead"	Jeff Beck, Jason Rebello	4:15
3.	"Never Alone"	Rebello	4:22
4.	"Over the Rainbow"	Harold Arlen	3:10
5.	"I Put a Spell on You" (featuring Joss Stone)	Screamin' Jay Hawkins	2:59
6.	"Serene" (featuring Olivia Safe)	Beck, Rebello	6:05
7.	"Lilac Wine" (featuring Imelda May)	James Shelton	4:44
8.	"Nessun Dorma"	Giacomo Puccini	2:56
9.	"There's No Other Me" (featuring Joss Stone)	Rebello, Joss Stone	4:05
10.	"Elegy for Dunkirk" (featuring Olivia Safe)	Dario Marianelli	5:03
Total length:			40:19

iTunes bonus track/Japanese bonus track
No.	Title	Writer(s)	Length
11.	"Poor Boy" (featuring Imelda May)	Traditional	4:42

Japanese bonus track
No.	Title	Writer(s)	Length
12.	"Cry Me a River"	Arthur Hamilton	4:31

== Personnel ==
- Jeff Beck – electric guitar
- Joss Stone – vocals (tracks 5, 9)
- Imelda May – vocals (track 7, 11)
- Olivia Safe – vocals (track 6, 10)
- Jason Rebello – keyboard
- Pete Murray – keyboard, orchestral arrangement
- Vinnie Colaiuta – drums, percussion (tracks 2, 3, 6, 9)
- Clive Deamer – drums
- Earl Harvin – drums
- Alessia Mattalia – drums
- Luís Jardim – percussion
- Chris Bruce – bass guitar (track 7)
- Pino Palladino – bass guitar (track 5)
- Tal Wilkenfeld – bass guitar (tracks 2, 3, 6, 9)

Technical

- Steve Lipson – production
- Trevor Horn – executive production

== Charts ==
Chart (2010)	Peak position
Australian Albums (ARIA)	49
Austrian Albums (Ö3 Austria)	44
Belgian Albums (Ultratop Wallonia)	87
Canadian Albums (Billboard)	9
Dutch Albums (Album Top 100)	77
Finnish Albums (Suomen virallinen lista)	35
French Albums (SNEP)	74
German Albums (Offizielle Top 100)	30
Greek Albums (IFPI Greece)	17
Italian Albums (FIMI)	56
Japanese Albums (Oricon)	9
Norwegian Albums (VG-lista)	17
Scottish Albums (Official Charts)	25
Swedish Albums (Sverigetopplistan)	35
Swiss Albums (Schweizer Hitparade)	40
UK Albums (Official Charts)	21
US Billboard 200	11
US Top Rock Albums (Billboard)	3
