= You Had It Coming =

Studio album by Jeff Beck
- Released: 15 November 2000
- Genre: Instrumental rock; electronica
- Length: 35:55
- Label: Epic
- Producer: Andy Wright

Jeff Beck chronology
Who Else! (1999)	You Had It Coming (2000)	Jeff (2003)

Professional ratings
Review scores
Source	Rating
AllMusic	3/5 stars
Rolling Stone	3/5 stars

You Had It Coming is the eighth studio album by guitarist Jeff Beck, released in December 2000 through Epic Records. The album reached No. 17 and 110 on the Billboard Top Internet Albums and Billboard 200 charts respectively, as well as No. 96 and 123 on the German and French albums chart. "Dirty Mind", went on to win the award for Best Rock Instrumental Performance at the 2002 Grammys; this being Beck's third such award, after the albums Flash (1985) and Jeff Beck's Guitar Shop (1989). Singer Imogen Heap is featured on "Dirty Mind" and "Rollin' and Tumblin'", and would later tour with Beck in 2004.

== Track listing ==
No.	Title	Writer(s)	Length
1.	"Earthquake"	Jennifer Batten	3:18
2.	"Roy's Toy"	Jeff Beck, Aidan Love, Andy Wright	3:35
3.	"Dirty Mind"	Beck, Love, Wright	3:50
4.	"Rollin' and Tumblin'"	Muddy Waters	3:12
5.	"Nadia"	Nitin Sawhney	3:50
6.	"Loose Cannon"	Beck, Batten, Wright	5:17
7.	"Rosebud"	Beck, Randy Hope-Taylor, Wright	3:44
8.	"Left Hook"	Beck, Steve Alexander, Wright	4:22
9.	"Blackbird"	Beck	1:27
10.	"Suspension"	Beck, Wright	3:20
Total length:			35:55

== Personnel ==
- Jeff Beck – guitars
- Jennifer Batten – guitars
- Imogen Heap – vocals (tracks 3, 4)
- Aidan Love – programming
- Steve Alexander – drums
- Randy Hope-Taylor – bass

Technical

- Matt Tait – audio engineering
- Kevin Metcalfe – mastering
- Andy Wright – production

== Charts ==
Chart (2000–2001)	Peak position
French Albums (SNEP)	123
German Albums (Offizielle Top 100)	96
Japanese Albums (Oricon)	14
UK Rock & Metal Albums (OCC)	14
US Billboard 200	110

== Awards ==
Event	Title	Award	Result
2002 Grammys	"Dirty Mind"	Best Rock Instrumental Performance	Won
