= Live and Exclusive from the Grammy Museum =

Live album by Jeff Beck
- Released: October 2010
- Venue: Grammy Museum
- Label: Atco

Live and Exclusive from the Grammy Museum is a live album by Jeff Beck, which was released in October 2010. The album contains performance from April 22, 2010 at the Grammy Museum in front of an intimate crowd of 200.

== Track listing ==
1. "Corpus Christi Carol" (Benjamin Britten)
2. "Hammerhead" (Jeff Beck, Jason Rebello)
3. "Over the Rainbow" (E.Y. Harburg, Harold Arlen)
4. "Brush With the Blues" (Jeff Beck, Tony Hymas)
5. "A Day in the Life" (John Lennon, Paul McCartney)
6. "Nessun Dorma" (Giacomo Puccini, Giuseppe Adami, Renato Simoni)
7. "How High The Moon" (Morgan Lewis, Nancy Hamilton)
8. "People Get Ready" (Curtis Mayfield)

== Personnel ==
- Jeff Beck - guitar
- Jason Rebello - keyboards
- Rhonda Smith - bass
- Narada Michael Walden - drums
