= Bones UK =

British rock band

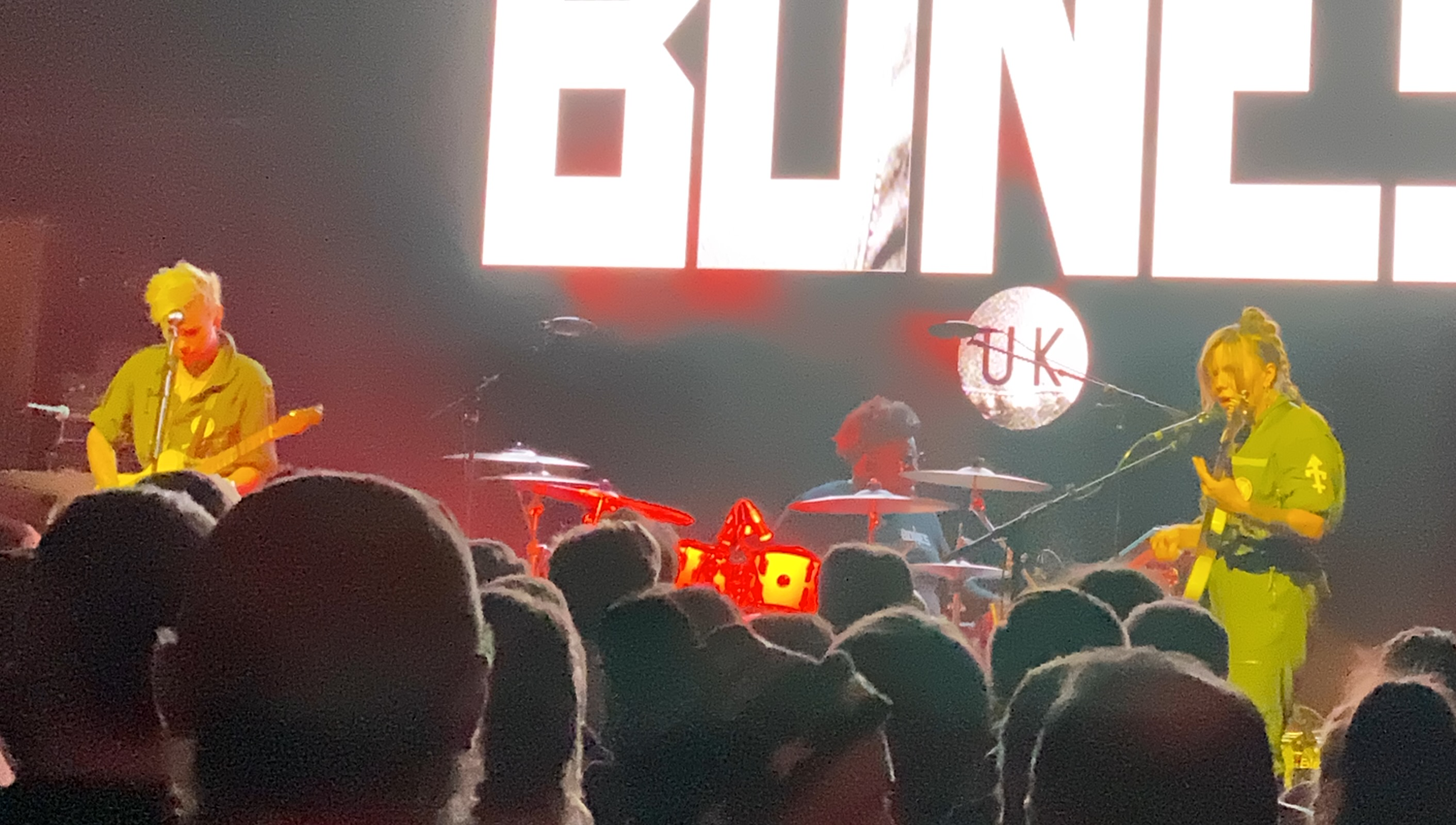
- Bones UK performing in 2019

Background information
- Origin: Camden Town, London
- Genres: Rock
- Years active: 2014–present
- Label: Sumerian
- Members: Rosie Bones; Carmen Vandenberg
- Website: Bones UK

Bones UK (stylised as BONES UK) is a rock band from Camden Town, London, consisting of Rosie Bones as lead vocalist/rhythm guitarist and lead guitarist Carmen Vandenberg.

Bones and Vandenberg met each other at the Blues Kitchen in Camden Town, and were in the all-girl band Fake Club from 2012 to 2014 before forming Bones UK later that year. They caught the attention of musician Jeff Beck early on in their career, who asked the band to cowrite his 2016 album, Loud Hailer, and to perform with him on tour. Since then, Bones UK relocated to Los Angeles, California.

The band has put out multiple singles independently before releasing their debut, self-titled album in July 2019 via Sumerian Records. On it, produced by Filippo Cimatti, Bones UK confront everything from the "beauty industrial complex" to toxic masculinity, to sexism within the music scene, and also includes a cover of David Bowie's "I'm Afraid of Americans" after being asked by Howard Stern to record the song for a Bowie tribute album. Loudwire named the album one of the 50 best rock efforts of 2019.

Following the success of "Pretty Waste", the single became nominated for a Grammy Award for Best Rock Performance in November 2019. In January 2020, Bones UK released an EP titled Unplugged and a short film of their performance online. In 2021, a single was released for the animated TV series Arcane, titled "Dirty Little Animals".

== Discography ==
Studio albums

- Bones UK (2019)
- Soft (2024)

Singles

- "Fat" (2016)
- "Beautiful is Boring" (2017)
- "Pretty Waste" (2019) – No. 27 Mainstream Rock Songs
- "Filthy Freak" (2019)
- "Choke" (2019)
- "Dirty Little Animals" (from the TV series Arcane) (2021)
- "Boys Will Be Girls" (2021)

Music videos

- "Beautiful Is Boring" – directed by Alex Warren
- "Creature" – directed by Rosie Bones and Gille Klabin
- "Filthy Freaks" – directed by Ryan Valdez
- "Choke" – directed by Gille Klabin
- "I'm Afraid of Americans" – directed by Alice Thirteen

Covers

- "Cherub Rock" (2026) for Sending Hearts To All My Dearies: A Tribute To The Smashing Pumpkins
