= Brian Wilson and Jeff Beck Tour 2013 =

2013 concert tour by Brian Wilson and Jeff Beck

- U.S. tour by Brian Wilson and Jeff Beck
- Start date: September 27, 2013
- End date: October 30, 2013
- Legs: 1
- No. of shows: 23

The Brian Wilson and Jeff Beck 2013 Tour was a 2013 tour starring Brian Wilson and Jeff Beck. The shows featured Wilson's former bandmates Al Jardine, David Marks and Blondie Chaplin.

== Background ==
Following The Beach Boys fiftieth anniversary tour, Brian Wilson, Al Jardine and David Marks decided to tour as a trio. The three played several shows in July 2013. On August 5, it was announced that Jeff Beck would accompany them for a tour in September and October, featuring Blondie Chaplin at select shows. The tour would help promote an upcoming Wilson record that featured Beck on several songs. Beck called the tour a dynamic of "classic surfing safari music and this weird stuff that I do," and promised "it will sound like it's all of one accord." Wilson remarked that Beck "brings that great guitar-player kind of thing to the picture."

"For four days," Beck later recalled, "I sat there and didn't even know Brian was in the room. He was so quiet, he never uttered a syllable. And yet they gave me these parts that allegedly he'd written. Then we were offered some shows together: 'Jeff, this is gonna be the tour of the year!' They should've got the bloody record done first, but they got excited and we ended up doing the Jeff Beck-Brian Wilson tour, prematurely."

== Tour dates ==
Date	City	Country	Venue
North America
September 27, 2013	Hollywood	United States	Hard Rock Live
September 28, 2013	Clearwater	United States	Ruth Eckerd Hall
October 1, 2013	Houston	United States	Bayou Music Center
October 3, 2013	St. Augustine	United States	St. Augustine Amphitheatre
October 4, 2013	Atlanta	United States	Chastain Park Amphitheater
October 5, 2013	Washington, D.C.	United States	Warner Theater
October 6, 2013	Bethlehem	United States	Sands Bethlehem Event Center
October 8, 2013	Albany	United States	Palace Theatre
October 9, 2013	Boston	United States	Wang Theater
October 10, 2013	New York City	United States	Late Night with Jimmy Fallon
October 11, 2013	Wallingford	United States	Toyota Presents the Oakdale Theater
October 12, 2013	Westbury	United States	NYCB Theatre
October 13, 2013	Upper Darby	United States	Tower Theatre
October 15, 2013	New York City	United States	Beacon Theatre
October 16, 2013	Montclair	United States	Wellmont Theatre
October 18, 2013	Las Vegas	United States	Pearl Concert Theater at Palms Casino Resort
October 20, 2013	Los Angeles	United States	Greek Theatre
October 22, 2013	Oakland	United States	Paramount Theatre
October 25, 2013	Detroit	United States	Fox Theatre
October 26, 2013	Toronto	Canada	Sony Centre for the Performing Arts
October 27, 2013	Akron	United States	EJ Thomas Hall
October 29, 2013	Chicago	United States	House of Blues
October 30, 2013	Milwaukee	United States	Riverside Theater
