= Gets Us All in the End =

Single by Jeff Beck

from the album Flash
- Released: 1985
- Genre: Pop rock, hard rock
- Length: 6:06
- Label: Epic
- Songwriters: Arthur Baker, Tina B.
- Producer: Arthur Baker

Jeff Beck singles chronology
"Escape" (1985)	"Gets Us All in the End" (1985)	"Stop, Look and Listen" (1985)

"Gets Us All in the End" is a single by guitarist Jeff Beck, released in 1985 through Epic Records. The song is the second track from his fourth studio album Flash, and reached No. 20 on the U.S. Billboard Mainstream Rock chart.

== Track listing ==
All tracks are written by Arthur Baker, Tina B.

No.	Title	Length
1.	"Gets Us All in the End"	6:06
Total length:		6:06
