= Who Else! =

Studio album by Jeff Beck
- Released: 16 March 1999
- Genre: Instrumental rock; electronica; techno
- Length: 53:52
- Label: Epic
- Producer: Jeff Beck, Tony Hymas

Jeff Beck chronology
Crazy Legs (1993)	Who Else! (1999)	You Had It Coming (2000)

Singles from Who Else!
- 1. "What Mama Said" Released: 1999

Professional ratings
Review scores
Source	Rating
AllMusic	4/5 stars
Rolling Stone	3.5/5 stars

Who Else! is the seventh studio album by guitarist Jeff Beck, released on 16 March 1999 through Epic Records. The album reached No. 99 on the U.S. Billboard 200 and marks the end of a decade-long absence of original material from Beck since the release of Jeff Beck's Guitar Shop in 1989. Stylistically it showcases the first addition of electronic and techno music into his repertoire, along with the blues-based instrumental rock and jazz fusion of previous albums.

Fellow guitarist Jennifer Batten, having often cited Beck's influence on her playing, is featured as a collaborator and subsequently joined him on tour for three years. The album features the collaborative songwriting of Tony Hymas. "Brush with the Blues" became a signature tune and concert staple, and along with "Angel (Footsteps)" made it onto his 2008 concert album Live at Ronnie Scott's. "What Mama Said" samples Dick Shawn's dialogue from the 1963 film It's a Mad, Mad, Mad, Mad World

== Track listing ==
No.	Title	Music	Length
1.	"What Mama Said"	Jennifer Batten, Jeff Beck, Tony Hymas	3:22
2.	"Psycho Sam"	Hymas	4:55
3.	"Brush with the Blues" (live)	Hymas, Beck	6:24
4.	"Blast from the East"	Hymas	4:46
5.	"Space for the Papa"	Hymas	7:41
6.	"Angel (Footsteps)"	Hymas	6:30
7.	"THX138"	Hymas	6:15
8.	"Hip-Notica"	Hymas, Beck	4:40
9.	"Even Odds"	Jan Hammer	3:29
10.	"Declan"	Dónal Lunny	4:02
11.	"Another Place"	Hymas	1:48
Total length:			53:52

== Personnel ==
- Jeff Beck – guitar, arrangement, producer
- Jennifer Batten – guitar, guitar synthesizer
- Mark Johns – guitar (track 10)
- Tony Hymas – keyboard (except track 9), sound effects, arrangement, production
- Jan Hammer – keyboard (track 9), drums (track 9)
- Simon Wallace – synthesizer (track 10)
- Steve Alexander – drums (except tracks 2, 9, 10)
- Manu Katché – drums (track 2), percussion (track 2)
- Randy Hope-Taylor – bass (except track 2)
- Pino Palladino – bass (track 2)
- Bob Loveday – violin (track 10)
- Clive Bell – flute (track 10)

Technical

- Simon Brint – editing (track 1), production assistance (track 10)
- Chris Sheldon – mixing
- Bob Ludwig – mastering
- Danny Clinch – cover photography

== Charts ==
Chart (1999)	Peak position
Japanese Albums (Oricon)	19
UK Albums (OCC)	74
US Billboard 200	99
