= Jeff (album) =

Studio album by Jeff Beck
- Released: 5 August 2003
- Recorded: Finished the recordings on his 59th birthday, June 24, 2003
- Studio: FRS; Metropolis Recording Studios, Apollo Control and BFD Studios in London
- Genre: Instrumental rock; electronica
- Length: 51:35
- Label: Epic
- Producer: Jeff Beck, Andy Wright, Apollo 440, Me One, Dean Garcia

Jeff Beck chronology
| You Had It Coming (2000) | Jeff (2003) | Emotion & Commotion (2010) |

Professional ratings
Review scores
| Source | Rating |
|---|---|
| AllMusic | 4/5 stars |
| Rolling Stone | 3/5 stars |

Jeff is the ninth studio album by guitarist Jeff Beck, released on 5 August 2003 through Epic Records. The album reached No. 92 on the French albums chart and No. 122 on the U.S. Billboard 200. "Plan B" won the award for Best Rock Instrumental Performance at the 2004 Grammys.

== Track listing ==
| No. | Title | Writer(s) | Length |
|---|---|---|---|
| 1. | "So What" | Dean Garcia, Jeff Beck | 4:19 |
| 2. | "Plan B" | Ron Aslan, Simon White, Beck, David Torn | 4:49 |
| 3. | "Pork-U-Pine" | Beck, Andy Wright, Paul Holroyde | 4:06 |
| 4. | "Seasons" | Ishmael Butler, Craig Irving, Maryann Viera, Syze-up, Beck, Wright, Matthew Vaughan | 3:48 |
| 5. | "Trouble Man" | Beck, Garcia, Wright | 3:34 |
| 6. | "Grease Monkey" | Howard Gray, Trevor Gray, Noko Fisher-Jones, Beck | 3:34 |
| 7. | "Hot Rod Honeymoon" | H. Gray, T. Gray, Fisher-Jones, Beck | 3:33 |
| 8. | "Line Dancing with Monkeys" | Aslan, White, Torn | 5:18 |
| 9. | "JB's Blues" | Garcia, Beck | 4:20 |
| 10. | "Pay Me No Mind (Jeff Beck Remix)" | Me One, Beck | 3:18 |
| 11. | "My Thing" | Beck, Nancy Sorrell, Wright | 4:10 |
| 12. | "Bulgaria" | trad., arr. Beck, Wright | 2:00 |
| 13. | "Why Lord Oh Why?" | Tony Hymas | 4:41 |
| Total length: | | | 51:35 |

Japanese edition bonus tracks
| No. | Title | Length |
|---|---|---|
| 14. | "Take a Ride (On My Bottleneck Slide)" | 4:54 |
| 15. | "My Thing (David Torn Remix)" | 4:27 |
| Total length: | | 60:51 |

=== Notes ===
• It’s My Thing was played on Malcolm in the Middle on Season 5, Episode 12: Softball.

== Personnel ==
- Jeff Beck – guitars, mixing (track 13), production (track 12)
- Saffron – vocals (track 3)
- Andy Wright – vocals (track 3), engineering (tracks 3–5, 11–13), production (tracks 3–5, 11, 12)
- Ronni Ancona – vocals (track 4)
- Nancy Sorrell – vocals (tracks 6, 7, 11)
- Apollo 440 – vocals (track 6), engineering (tracks 6, 7), production (tracks 6, 7)
- Baylen Leonard – vocals (track 7)
- The Beeched Boys – vocals (track 7)
- Me One – vocals (track 10), mixing (track 10), production (track 10)
- Wil Malone – orchestration arrangement (tracks 4, 12)
- London Session Orchestra – orchestration (tracks 12, 13)
- Steve Barney – drums (tracks 2, 3, 4, 5, 8, 11)
- Paul Kodish – drums (track 7)

Technical

- Dean Garcia – engineering (tracks 1, 9), mixing (tracks 1, 9), production (tracks 1, 9)
- Dave Bloor – engineering (tracks 3–5, 11, 13)
- James Brown – engineering (tracks 3–5, 11)
- Jamie Maher – engineering (track 10), mixing (track 10)
- John Hudson – additional engineering (tracks 4, 13), additional mixing (track 13)
- Ferg Peterkin – engineering assistance (tracks 3–5, 11–13)
- Ashley Krajewski – engineering assistance (tracks 6, 7)
- David Torn – mixing (tracks 2, 8), production (tracks 2, 8)
- Michael Barbiero – mixing (tracks 3–5, 11–13)
- Howard Gray – mixing (tracks 6, 7)
- Tony Hymas – mixing (track 13)

== Charts ==
| Chart (2003) | Peak position |
|---|---|
| French Albums (SNEP) | 92 |
| Japanese Albums (Oricon) | 24 |
| UK Rock & Metal Albums (OCC) | 31 |
| US Billboard 200 | 122 |

== Awards ==
| Event | Award | Result |
|---|---|---|
| 2004 Grammys | Best Rock Instrumental Performance | Won |
