= Live: B.B. King Blues Club & Grill, New York (Jeff Beck) =

Jeff Beck: Live at the B B King Blues Club is a live guitar instrumental album by Jeff Beck. Although the material was recorded in 2003, the album was not released to the general public until 2006 (although it was available exclusively through Sony Music's online store in 2004).

AllMusic described it as a "stirring set" "spinning out solid and often hauntingly beautiful instrumental versions of an eclectic array of songs."

== Track listing ==
1. "Roy's Toy"
2. "Psychosam"
3. "Big Block"
4. "Freeway Jam"
5. "Brush with the Blues"
6. "Scatterbrain"
7. "Goodbye Pork Pie Hat"
8. "Nadia"
9. "Savoy"
10. "Angel (Footsteps)"
11. "Seasons"
12. "Where Were You"
13. "You Never Know"
14. "A Day in the Life"
15. "People Get Ready"
16. "My Thing"

== Personnel ==
- Jeff Beck - guitars, bass guitar, special effects
- Terry Bozzio - drums, percussion
- Tony Hymas - keyboards, effects
