= Jeff Beck =

English guitarist (1944–2023)

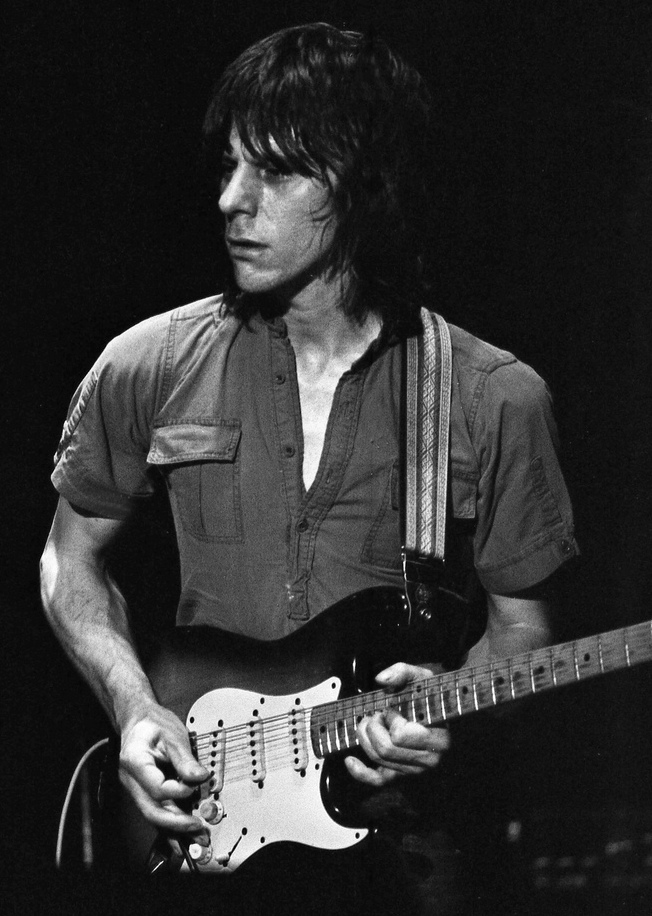
- Beck performing in Amsterdam, 1979

Background information
- Born: Geoffrey Arnold Beck; 24 June 1944; Wallington, Surrey, England
- Died: 10 January 2023 (aged 78) East Sussex, England
- Genres: Blues rock; hard rock; instrumental rock; jazz fusion; progressive rock
- Occupations: Musician
- Instruments: Guitar; talk box; vocals
- Works: Discography
- Years active: 1963–2023
- Labels: EMI; Epic
- Formerly of: The Yardbirds; The Jeff Beck Group; Beck, Bogert & Appice; The Honeydrippers
- Website: jeffbeck.com

Geoffrey Arnold Beck (24 June 1944 – 10 January 2023) was an English guitarist. He rose to prominence as a member of the rock band the Yardbirds, and afterwards founded and fronted the Jeff Beck Group and Beck, Bogert & Appice. In 1975, he switched to an instrumental style with focus on an innovative sound, and his releases spanned genres and styles ranging from blues rock, hard rock, jazz fusion and a blend of guitar-rock and electronica.

Beck has been consistently ranked in the top five of Rolling Stone and other magazines' lists of the greatest guitarists. He was often called a "guitarist's guitarist". Rolling Stone described him as "one of the most influential lead guitarists in rock". Although he recorded two successful albums (1975's Blow by Blow and 1976's Wired) as a solo act, Beck did not establish or maintain commercial success like that of his contemporaries and bandmates. He recorded with many artists.

Beck earned wide critical praise and received the Grammy Award for Best Rock Instrumental Performance six times, winning in three categories at the 2010 Grammy Awards for a career total of eight Grammies. In 2014, he received the British Academy's Ivor Novello Award for Outstanding Contribution to British Music. He was inducted into the Rock and Roll Hall of Fame twice: first as a member of the Yardbirds (1992) and secondly as a solo artist (2009).

== Early life ==
I was interested in the electric guitar even before I knew the difference between electric and acoustic. The electric guitar seemed to be a totally fascinating plank of wood with knobs and switches on it. I just had to have one.

— Jeff Beck

Geoffrey Arnold Beck was born on 24 June 1944 to Arnold and Ethel Beck at 206 Demesne Road, Wallington, Surrey (now London Borough of Sutton, Greater London). As a ten-year-old, Beck sang in a church choir. He had a sister, Annetta. He attended Sutton Manor School and Sutton East County Secondary Modern School.

Beck cited Les Paul as the first electric guitar player who impressed him. Beck said that he first heard an electric guitar when he was six years old and heard Paul playing "How High the Moon" on the radio. He asked his mother what it was. After she replied it was an electric guitar and was all tricks, he said, "That's for me". Cliff Gallup, lead guitarist with Gene Vincent and the Blue Caps, was also an early musical influence, followed by B. B. King and Steve Cropper. Beck considered Lonnie Mack "a rock guitarist [who] was unjustly overlooked [and] a major influence on him and many others."

As a teenager, he learned to play on a borrowed guitar and made several attempts to build his own instrument, first by gluing and bolting together cigar boxes for the body and an unsanded fence post for the neck with model aircraft control lines and frets simply painted on it.

After leaving school, he attended Wimbledon School of Art (now Wimbledon College of Arts). Then, he was briefly employed as a painter and decorator, a groundsman on a golf course, and a car paint sprayer. Beck's sister Annetta introduced him to Jimmy Page when both were teenagers.

== Career ==
=== Beginnings and Yardbirds: 1963–1967 ===
While attending Wimbledon College of Art, Beck played in a succession of groups. In 1963, after Ian Stewart of the Rolling Stones introduced him to R&B, he formed The Nightshift with whom he played at the 100 Club on Oxford Street. Beck joined the Rumbles, a Croydon band, in 1963 for a short period as lead guitarist, playing Gene Vincent and Buddy Holly songs, displaying a talent for mimicking guitar styles. Later in 1963, he joined the Tridents, a band from the Chiswick area. "They were really my scene because they were playing flat-out R&B, like Jimmy Reed stuff, and we supercharged it all up and made it really rocky. I got off on that, even though it was only twelve-bar blues." He was a session guitarist on a 1964 Parlophone single by the Fitz and Startz titled "I'm Not Running Away", with B-side "So Sweet". Also in 1964, Beck was part of Screaming Lord Sutch and the Savages when they recorded "Dracula's Daughter"/"Come Back Baby" for Oriole Records.

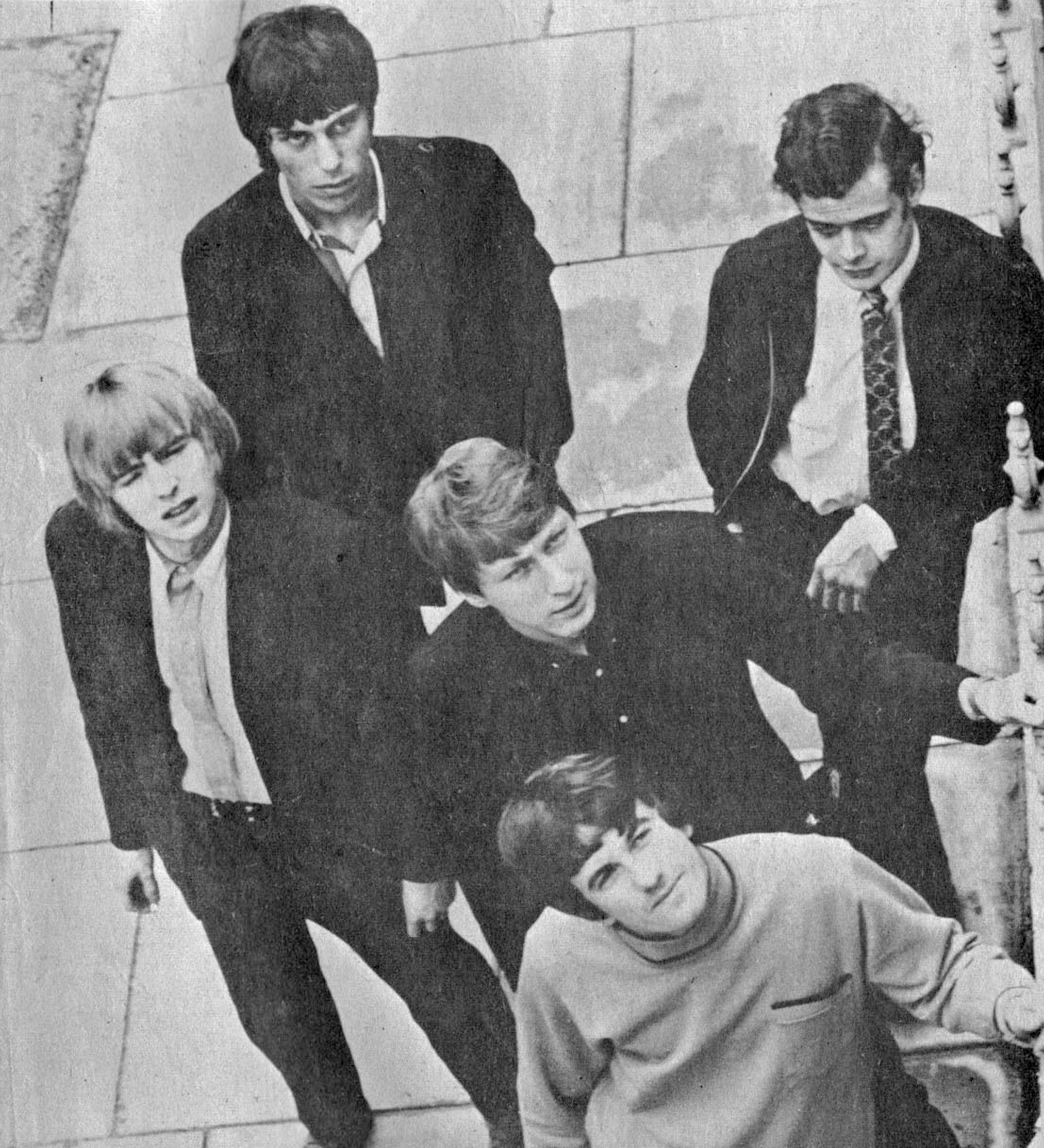
Beck (top left) in 1965 with the Yardbirds

In March 1965, Beck was recruited by the Yardbirds to succeed Eric Clapton on the recommendation of fellow session musician Jimmy Page, who had been their initial choice. The Yardbirds recorded most of their Top 40 hit songs during Beck's short but significant 20-month tenure with the band allowing him only one full album, which became known as Roger the Engineer (titled Over Under Sideways Down in the U.S.), released in 1966. In May 1966, Beck recorded an instrumental titled "Beck's Bolero". Rather than members of the Yardbirds, he was backed by Page on 12-string rhythm guitar, Keith Moon on drums, John Paul Jones on bass, and Nicky Hopkins on piano. In June, Page joined the Yardbirds, at first on bass and later on second lead guitar. This dual lead-guitar lineup was filmed performing an adaptation of "Train Kept A-Rollin'", titled "Stroll On", for the 1966 Michelangelo Antonioni film Blowup.

Beck was fired during a U.S. tour for being a consistent no-show and for difficulties caused by his perfectionism and explosive temper on stage.

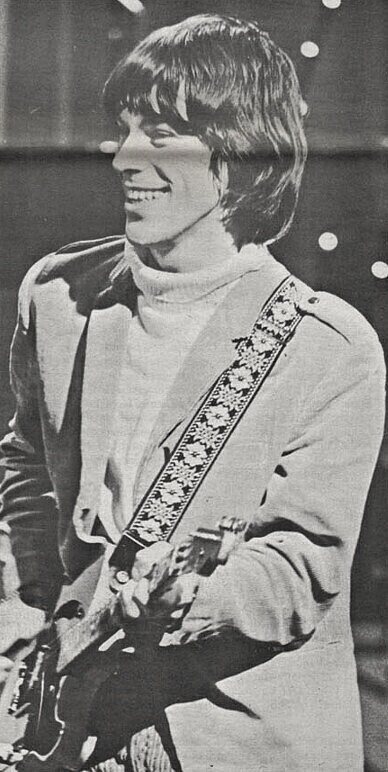
Beck playing with the Yardbirds, early 1966

=== Band leader and co-leader: 1967 to 1974 ===
In 1967, he recorded several solo singles for pop producer Mickie Most, including "Hi Ho Silver Lining" and "Tallyman", which also included his vocals. He then formed the Jeff Beck Group, which included Rod Stewart on vocals, Ronnie Wood on bass, Nicky Hopkins on piano, and Aynsley Dunbar on drums (replaced by Micky Waller).

The group produced two albums for Columbia Records (Epic in the US): Truth (as Jeff Beck, August 1968) and Beck-Ola (July 1969). Truth, released five months before the first Led Zeppelin album, features "You Shook Me", a song written by Willie Dixon and first recorded by Muddy Waters, also covered on the Led Zeppelin debut with a similar arrangement. It sold well (reaching No. 15 on the Billboard charts). Beck-Ola saw drummer Micky Waller replaced by Tony Newman, and, while well-received, was less successful both commercially and critically. Resentment, coupled with touring incidents, led the group to disband in July 1969.

In his autobiography, Nick Mason recalls that, during 1967, Pink Floyd had wanted to recruit Beck to be its guitarist after the departure of Syd Barrett, but "none of us had the nerve to ask him." In 1969, following the death of Brian Jones, Beck was approached about joining the Rolling Stones.

After the break-up of his group, Beck took part in the Music from Free Creek "super session" project, billed as "A. N. Other" and contributed lead guitar on four songs, including one co-written by him. In September 1969, he teamed with the rhythm section of Vanilla Fudge: bassist Tim Bogert and drummer Carmine Appice (when they were in England to resolve contractual issues), but when Beck fractured his skull in a car accident near Maidstone in December the plan was postponed for two-and-a-half years, during which time Bogert and Appice formed Cactus. Beck later remarked on the 1960s period of his life: "Everyone thinks of the 1960s as something they really weren't. It was the frustration period of my life. The electronic equipment just wasn't up to the sounds I had in my head."

In 1970, after Beck had regained his health, he set about forming a band with the drummer Cozy Powell. Beck, Powell, and producer Mickie Most flew to the United States and recorded several tracks at Motown's famed Studio A in Hitsville U.S.A. with the Funk Brothers, Motown's in-house band, but the results remained unreleased. By April 1971 Beck had completed the line-up of this new group with guitarist/vocalist Bobby Tench, keyboard player Max Middleton, and bassist Clive Chaman. The new band performed as "The Jeff Beck Group" but had a substantially different sound from the first line-up.

Rough and Ready (October 1971), the first album they recorded, on which Beck wrote or co-wrote six of the album's seven tracks, included elements of soul, rhythm-and-blues, and jazz, foreshadowing the direction Beck's music would take later in the decade.

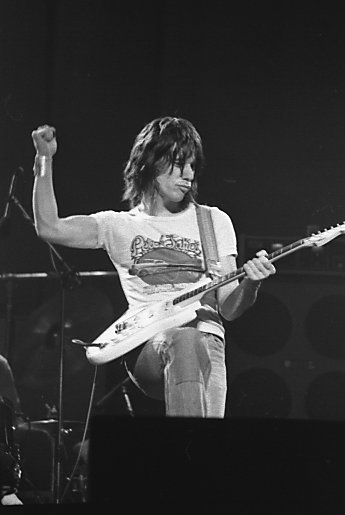
Beck in 1973

A second album, Jeff Beck Group (July 1972), was recorded at TMI studios in Memphis with the same personnel. Beck employed Steve Cropper as producer and the album displayed a strong soul influence, five of the nine tracks being covers of songs by American artists. One, "I Got to Have a Song", was the first of four Stevie Wonder compositions covered by Beck. Shortly after the release of the Jeff Beck Group album, the band was dissolved and Beck's management put out the statement that: "The fusion of the musical styles of the various members has been successful within the terms of individual musicians, but they didn't feel it had led to the creation of a new musical style with the strength they had originally sought".

Beck then started collaborating with bassist Tim Bogert and drummer Carmine Appice, who became available following the demise of Cactus but continued touring as the Jeff Beck Group in August 1972, to fulfill contractual obligations with his promoter, with a line-up including Bogert, Appice, Max Middleton and vocalist Kim Milford. After six appearances, Milford was replaced by Bobby Tench, who was flown in from the United Kingdom for the Arie Crown Theatre Chicago performance and the rest of the tour, which concluded at the Paramount North West Theatre, Seattle. After the tour, Tench and Middleton left the band and the power trio Beck, Bogert & Appice emerged. Appice took on the role of vocalist with Bogert and Beck contributing occasionally.

They were included on the bill for Rock at The Oval in September 1972, still as "The Jeff Beck Group", which marked the start of a tour schedule of the United Kingdom, the Netherlands, and Germany. Another U.S. tour began in October 1972, starting at the Hollywood Sportatorium Florida and concluding on 11 November 1972 at The Warehouse in New Orleans. In April 1973 the album Beck, Bogert & Appice was released (on Epic Records). While critics acknowledged the band's instrumental prowess the album was not commercially well received except for its cover of Stevie Wonder's hit "Superstition".

On 3 July 1973, Beck joined David Bowie onstage to perform "The Jean Genie"/"Love Me Do" and "Around and Around". The show was filmed and was finally released in the 2022 Bowie documentary Moonage Daydream. During October 1973 Beck recorded tracks for Michael Fennelly's album Lane Changer.

Early in January 1974, Beck, Bogert & Appice played at the Rainbow Theatre in London as part of a European tour. The concert was broadcast in full on the U.S. show Rock Around the World in September of the same year. This last recorded work by the band previewed material intended for a second studio album, included on the bootleg At Last Rainbow. The tracks "Blues Deluxe" and "BBA Boogie" from this concert were later included on the Jeff Beck compilation Beckology (1991).

Beck, Bogert & Appice dissolved in April 1974 before their second studio album (produced by Jimmy Miller) was finished. Their live album Beck, Bogert & Appice Live in Japan, recorded during their 1973 tour of Japan, was not released until February 1975 by Epic/Sony.

After a few months, Beck entered Underhill Studio and met with the band Upp; he recruited them to be the backing band for his appearance on the BBC TV program Guitar Workshop in August 1974. Beck produced and played on their self-titled debut album and their second album This Way Upp, though his contributions to the second album went uncredited. During 1974, he participated in recording sessions for the first album by former Jeff Beck Group member Bobby Tench's band Hummingbird' but did not contribute to the album.

=== Going solo: 1974 to 1980 ===
In October the same year, Beck began to record instrumental sessions at AIR Studios with Max Middleton who was also associated with Hummingbird, bassist Phil Chen and drummer Richard Bailey using George Martin as producer and arranger. These formed the basis for Beck's solo album Blow by Blow (March 1975) and showcased Beck's technical prowess in jazz-rock. The album reached number four in the charts and is Beck's most commercially successful release. Beck, fastidious about overdubs and often dissatisfied with his solos, often returned to AIR Studios to rework a solo. A couple of months after the sessions had finished, producer George Martin received a telephone call from Beck, who wanted to record a solo section again. Bemused, Martin replied: "I'm sorry, Jeff, but the record is in the shops!"

Beck put together a live band for a US tour, which was preceded by a small and unannounced gig at The Newlands Tavern in Peckham, London. He toured through April and May 1975, mostly supporting the Mahavishnu Orchestra, retaining Max Middleton on keyboards but with a new rhythm section of bassist Wilbur Bascomb and noted session drummer Bernard "Pretty" Purdie.

In a May 1975 show in Cleveland at the Music Hall, he became frustrated with an early version of a talk box he used on his arrangement of the Beatles' "She's a Woman", and after breaking a string, tossed his legendary Yardbirds-era Fender Stratocaster guitar off the stage. He did the same with the talk box and finished the show playing a Les Paul guitar without the box. During this tour he performed at Yuya Uchida's "World Rock Festival", playing eight songs with Purdie. In addition, he performed a guitar and drum instrumental with Johnny Yoshinaga and, at the end of the festival, joined in a live jam with bassist Felix Pappalardi of Mountain and vocalist Akira "Joe" Yamanaka from the Flower Travellin' Band. Only his set with Purdie was recorded and released.

Beck returned to the studio and recorded Wired (1976), which paired ex-Mahavishnu Orchestra drummer and composer Narada Michael Walden and keyboardist Jan Hammer. The album used a jazz-rock fusion style, which sounded similar to the work of his two collaborators. To promote the album, Beck joined forces with the Jan Hammer Group, playing a show supporting Alvin Lee at The Roundhouse in May 1976, before embarking on a seven-month-long world tour. This resulted in the live album Jeff Beck with the Jan Hammer Group Live (1977).

At this point, Beck was a tax exile and took up residency in the US, remaining there until his return to the UK in the autumn of 1977. In the spring of 1978, he began rehearsing with ex-Return to Forever bassist Stanley Clarke and drummer Gerry Brown towards a projected appearance at the Knebworth Festival, but this was cancelled after Brown dropped out. Beck toured Japan for three weeks in November 1978 with an ad hoc group consisting of Clarke and newcomers Tony Hymas (keyboards) and Simon Phillips (drums).

Work then began on a new studio album at the Who's Ramport Studios in London and continued sporadically throughout 1979, resulting in There & Back in June 1980. It featured three tracks composed and recorded with Jan Hammer, while five were written with Hymas. Stanley Clarke was replaced by Mo Foster on bass, both on the album and the subsequent tours. Its release was followed by extensive touring in the US, Japan, and the UK.

=== Collaboration years: 1980s and 1990s ===
In 1981, Beck made a series of historic live appearances with his Yardbirds predecessor Eric Clapton at the Amnesty International-sponsored benefit concerts dubbed The Secret Policeman's Other Ball shows. In that show, he appeared with Clapton on "Crossroads", "Further on Up the Road", and his arrangement of Stevie Wonder's "Cause We've Ended As Lovers". Beck also featured prominently in an all-star band finale performance of "I Shall Be Released" with Clapton, Sting, Phil Collins, Donovan, and Bob Geldof. Beck's contributions were seen and heard in the resulting album and film, both of which achieved worldwide success in 1982. Another benefit show, the ARMS Concert for multiple sclerosis, featured a jam with Beck, Eric Clapton, and Jimmy Page, during which they performed "Tulsa Time" and "Layla".

In 1985, Beck released Flash, featuring a variety of vocalists, but most notably former bandmate Rod Stewart on a rendition of Curtis Mayfield's "People Get Ready". The aforementioned cover song was also released as a single which went on to become a hit. A video was made for the track and the clip achieved heavy rotation on MTV. The two also played a few dates together during this time but a full tour in tandem never materialized. At Stewart's induction to the Rock and Roll Hall of Fame in 1992, Beck gave the induction speech saying of Stewart, "We have a love hate relationship—he loves me and I hate him." During this time, Beck made several guest appearances with other performers, including one in the 1988 movie Twins, where he played guitar with singer Nicolette Larson.

After a four-year break, he made a return to instrumental music with the 1989 album Jeff Beck's Guitar Shop, the first album to feature Beck as a fingerstyle guitarist, leaving the plectrum playing style. It was only his third album to be released in the 1980s. Much of Beck's sparse and sporadic recording schedule was due in part to a long battle with tinnitus.

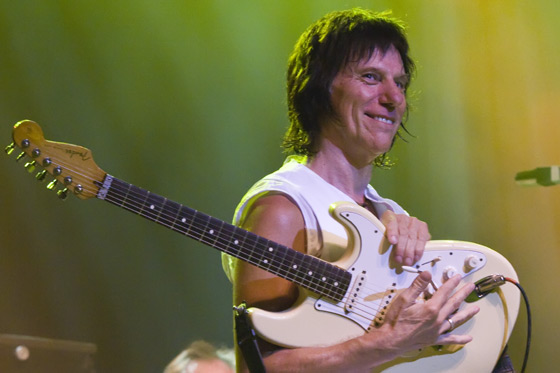
Beck at the Enmore Theatre in Sydney, 2009

In the 1990s, Beck had a higher musical output. He contributed to Jon Bon Jovi's solo debut album Blaze of Glory in 1990, playing the main solo of the album's title song, which was also the theme song to the movie Young Guns II. The same year, he was a featured performer on Hans Zimmer's score for the film Days of Thunder. He played lead guitar on Roger Waters' 1992 concept album Amused to Death, and on the 1993 albums The Red Shoes by Kate Bush and Love Scenes by Beverley Craven. He recorded the 1992 instrumental soundtrack album Frankie's House, as well as Crazy Legs (1993), a tribute album to 1950s rockabilly group Gene Vincent and the Blue Caps and their influential guitarist Cliff Gallup.

Beck rehearsed with Guns N' Roses for their concert in Paris in 1992, but did not play in the actual concert due to ear damage caused by a Matt Sorum cymbal crash, causing Beck to become temporarily deaf. The Yardbirds were inducted into the Rock and Roll Hall of Fame in 1992. In Beck's acceptance speech, he humorously noted that "Someone told me I should be proud tonight ... But I'm not, because they kicked me out ... They did ... Fuck them!"

He accompanied Paul Rodgers of Bad Company on the album Muddy Water Blues: A Tribute to Muddy Waters in 1993.

=== Solo career renewal: 1999 to 2020s ===
Beck's next release was in 1999, his first foray into guitar-based electronica, Who Else!. The album was Beck's first collaboration with a female instrumentalist, Jennifer Batten, in touring, writing, and recording as well as the first time he had worked with another guitarist on his own material since playing in the Yardbirds. Beck continued to work with Batten through the post-release tour of You Had It Coming in 2001.

Beck won his third Grammy Award, this one for "Best Rock Instrumental Performance" for the track "Dirty Mind" from You Had It Coming (2000). The song "Plan B" from the 2003 release Jeff, earned Beck his fourth Grammy Award for Best Rock Instrumental Performance, and was proof that the new electro-guitar style he used for the two earlier albums would continue to dominate. Beck was the opening act for B.B. King in the summer of 2003 and appeared at Eric Clapton's Crossroads Guitar Festival in 2004. Additionally, in 2004, Beck was featured on the song "54-46 Was My Number" by Toots and the Maytals as part of the album True Love which won the Grammy Award for Best Reggae Album.

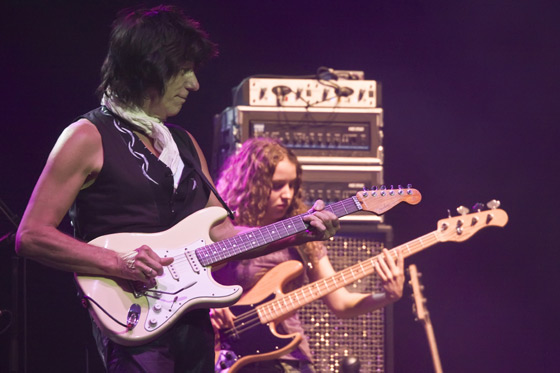
Beck with Tal Wilkenfeld on the 2007 Crossroads Guitar Festival tour

In 2007, he accompanied Kelly Clarkson for her cover of Patty Griffin's "Up to the Mountain", during the Idol Gives Back episode of American Idol. The performance was recorded live and afterward, was immediately released for sale. In the same year, he appeared once again at Clapton's Crossroads Guitar Festival, performing with Vinnie Colaiuta, Jason Rebello, and then 21-year-old bassist Tal Wilkenfeld.

Beck announced a world tour in early 2009 and remained faithful to the same lineup of musicians as in his tour two years before, playing and recording at Ronnie Scott's in London to a sold-out audience. Beck played on the song "Black Cloud" on the 2009 Morrissey album Years of Refusal and later that year, Harvey Goldsmith became Beck's manager. Beck was inducted into the Rock and Roll Hall of Fame as a solo artist on 4 April 2009; the award was presented by Jimmy Page. Beck performed "Train Kept A-Rollin'" along with Page, Ronnie Wood, Joe Perry, Flea, and Metallica members James Hetfield, Robert Trujillo, Lars Ulrich, Kirk Hammett, and Jason Newsted. On 4 July 2009, David Gilmour joined Beck onstage at the Albert Hall. Beck and Gilmour traded solos on "Jerusalem" and closed the show with "Hi Ho Silver Lining".

Beck's album Emotion & Commotion was released in April 2010. It features a mixture of original songs and covers such as "Over the Rainbow", Puccini's Nessun Dorma and Benjamin Britten's Corpus Christi Carol, interpreted through Beck's "uniquely sensitive touch". Joss Stone and Imelda May provided some of the guest vocals. Two tracks from Emotion & Commotion won Grammy Awards in 2011: "Nessun Dorma" won the Grammy Award for Best Pop Instrumental Performance, and "Hammerhead" won the Grammy Award for Best Rock Instrumental Performance. Beck collaborated on "Imagine" for the 2010 Herbie Hancock album, The Imagine Project along with Seal, P!nk, India.Arie, Konono N°1, Oumou Sangare and others and received a third Grammy in 2011 for Best Pop Collaboration with Vocals for the track.

Beck's 2010 World Tour band featured Grammy-winning musician Narada Michael Walden on drums, Rhonda Smith on bass, and Jason Rebello on keyboards. He released a live album titled Live and Exclusive from the Grammy Museum on 25 October 2010. On 9 June 2010, Beck with Imelda May's band recorded a DVD named Rock 'n' Roll Party (Honoring Les Paul), of a concert at the Iridium in NYC featuring several Les Paul songs (with Ms. May doing the Mary Ford vocals).

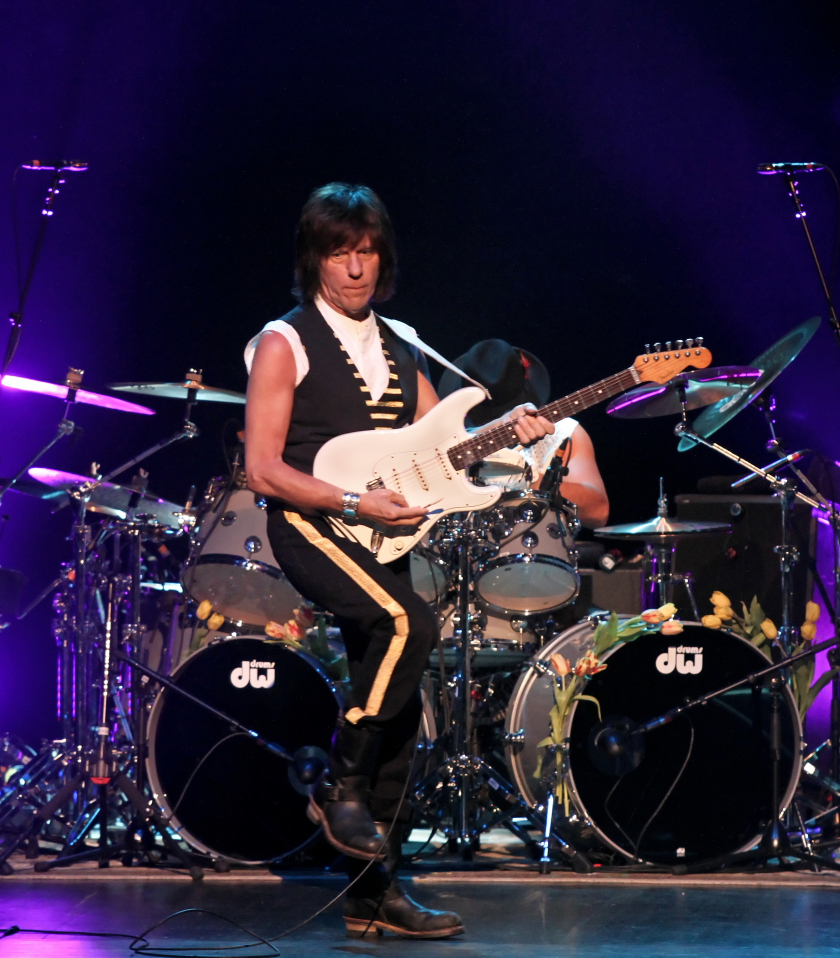
Beck performing in 2011

In 2011, Beck received two honorary degrees from British universities. On 18 July 2011, he was honoured with a fellowship from the University of the Arts London in recognition of his "outstanding contribution to the field of Music". On 21 July 2011, Beck was also presented with an honorary doctorate from the University of Sussex (by Sanjeev Bhaskar, the university's chancellor), the citation stating that the honour acknowledged "an outstanding musical career and celebrated the relationship between the university and the Brighton Institute of Modern Music (BIMM)".

In 2013, it was announced that Beck would be performing on Beach Boys founder Brian Wilson's solo album (alongside Beach Boys Al Jardine and David Marks) on Capitol Records. On 20 June, Wilson's website announced that the material might be split into three albums: one of new pop songs, another of mostly instrumental tracks with Beck, and another of interwoven tracks dubbed "the suite". Beck also accompanied Wilson (along with Jardine and Marks) on an 18-date fall 2013 tour, which started in late September and ended in late October (prior to which, Beck made clear that he regarded sharing the stage with Wilson as a complete honour for himself).

In 2014, to mark the beginning of Jeff's World Tour in Japan, a three-track CD titled Yosogai was released on 5 April; the album had yet to be finalized at the time of the tour. In November 2014, he accompanied Joss Stone at The Royal British Legion's Festival of Remembrance at the Royal Albert Hall.

For the 2016 album Loud Hailer, Beck teamed up with Carmen Vandenberg and Rosie Bones of Bones UK. The album protests the state of the world, with titles ranging from Thugs' Club via Scared for the Children to O.I.L. (Can't Get Enough of That Sticky).

On 16 April 2020, Beck released a new single, in which he collaborated with Johnny Depp to record John Lennon's song "Isolation", explaining that this was a first record release from an ongoing musical collaboration between the two men. They had been recording music together for some time, with the track being produced the year before, but Beck explained that the decision to release it was influenced by the COVID-19 pandemic lockdowns: "We weren't expecting to release it so soon but given all the hard days and true 'isolation' that people are going through in these challenging times, we decided now might be the right time to let you all hear it".

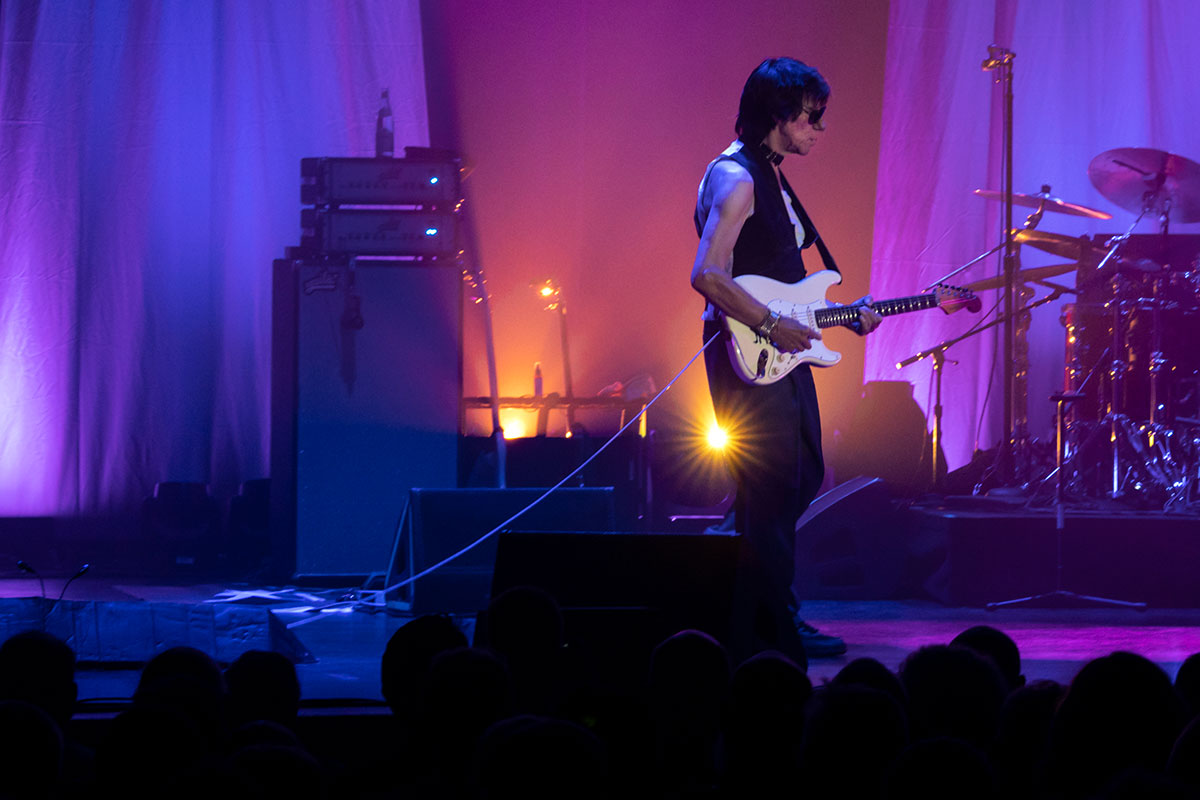
Beck performing in Denmark, 2022

On 2 June 2022, Beck was in the news after Depp appeared with him at The Sage in Gateshead, following his victory in the high-profile defamation case against his ex-wife Amber Heard. Both also had performed at the Royal Albert Hall in London earlier in the week. Beck and Depp's first single from their collaborative album 18, titled "This Is a Song for Miss Hedy Lamarr", was announced on 10 June 2022.

Beck was featured on two tracks (the title track and "A Thousand Shades") from Ozzy Osbourne's album Patient Number 9, which was released on 24 June 2022. On Dion DiMucci's 2020 album Blues with Friends he played lead guitar on "Can't Start Over Again".

Beck's final recording before his death was his contribution to a supergroup recording of "Going Home: Theme of the Local Hero" to support the Teenage Cancer Trust and Teen Cancer America.

== Style and influence ==
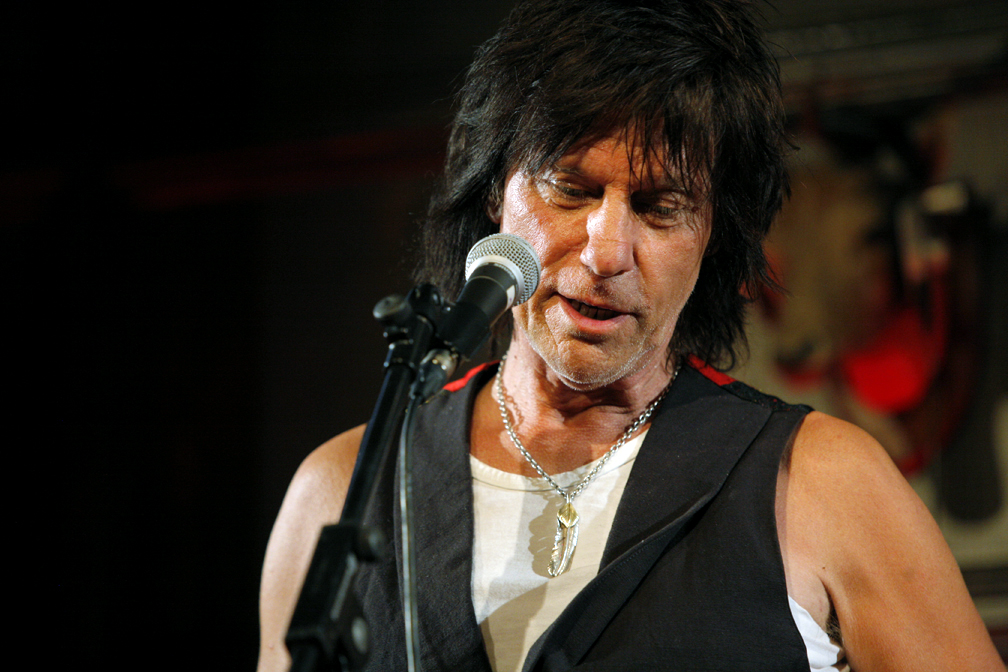
Beck at the 2009 MOJO Awards

Described by Rolling Stone magazine as "one of the most influential lead guitarists in rock", Beck cited his major influences as Les Paul, the Shadows, Cliff Gallup, Ravi Shankar, Roy Buchanan, Chet Atkins, Django Reinhardt, Steve Cropper and Lonnie Mack. Beck said John McLaughlin "has given us so many different facets of the guitar and introduced thousands of us to world music, by blending Indian music with jazz and classical. I'd say he was the best guitarist alive." McLaughlin also praised Beck, calling Beck his favorite progressive rock artist.

According to musicologist and historian Bob Gulla, Beck is credited for popularising the use of audio feedback and distortion on guitar. During his short time with the Yardbirds, Beck's experimentation with feedback, distortion, and "fuzz" tone "pushed the band into directions that would open the door for psychedelic rock" while "jolt[ing] British rock forward", according to Gulla. While Beck was not the first rock guitarist to experiment with electronic distortion, he nonetheless helped to redefine the sound and role of the electric guitar in rock music. His use of a commercial fuzz box for the Yardbirds' "Heart Full of Soul" (June 1965) has been cited as perhaps the first significant use of the effect. Beck's work with the Yardbirds and the Jeff Beck Group's 1968 album Truth were seminal influences on heavy metal music, which emerged in full force in the early 1970s. Gulla identifies one of Beck's characteristic traits to be his sense of pitch, particularly in exercising the whammy bar to create sounds ranging from "nose-diving bombs to subtle, perfectly pitched harmonic melodies".

According to guitarist and author Jack Wilkins, Beck is regarded alongside Jimi Hendrix and Eric Clapton as one of his generation's greatest guitarists, receiving praise for his technical skill and versatile playing. Stephen Thomas Erlewine finds him to be "as innovative as Jimmy Page, as tasteful as Eric Clapton, and nearly as visionary as Jimi Hendrix", although unable to achieve their mainstream success, "primarily because of the haphazard way he approached his career" while often lacking a star singer to help make his music more accessible. On his recorded output by 1991, Erlewine remarked that "never has such a gifted musician had such a spotty discography", believing Beck had largely released "remarkably uneven" solo records and only "a few terrific albums". In Christgau's Record Guide (1981), Robert Christgau essentialised Beck as "a technician" and questioned his ability to "improvise long lines, or jazz it up with a modicum of delicacy, or for that matter get funky", although he later observed a "customary focus, loyalty, and consistency of taste".

In 2015, Beck was ranked No. 5 in Rolling Stone magazine's list of the "100 Greatest Guitarists". In an accompanying essay, guitarist Mike Campbell applauded Beck for his "brilliant technique" and "personality" in his playing, including a sense of humour, expressed through the growl of his wah-wah effects. Campbell also credited Beck with expanding the boundaries of the blues, particularly in his two collaborations with Stewart.

== Technique and equipment ==
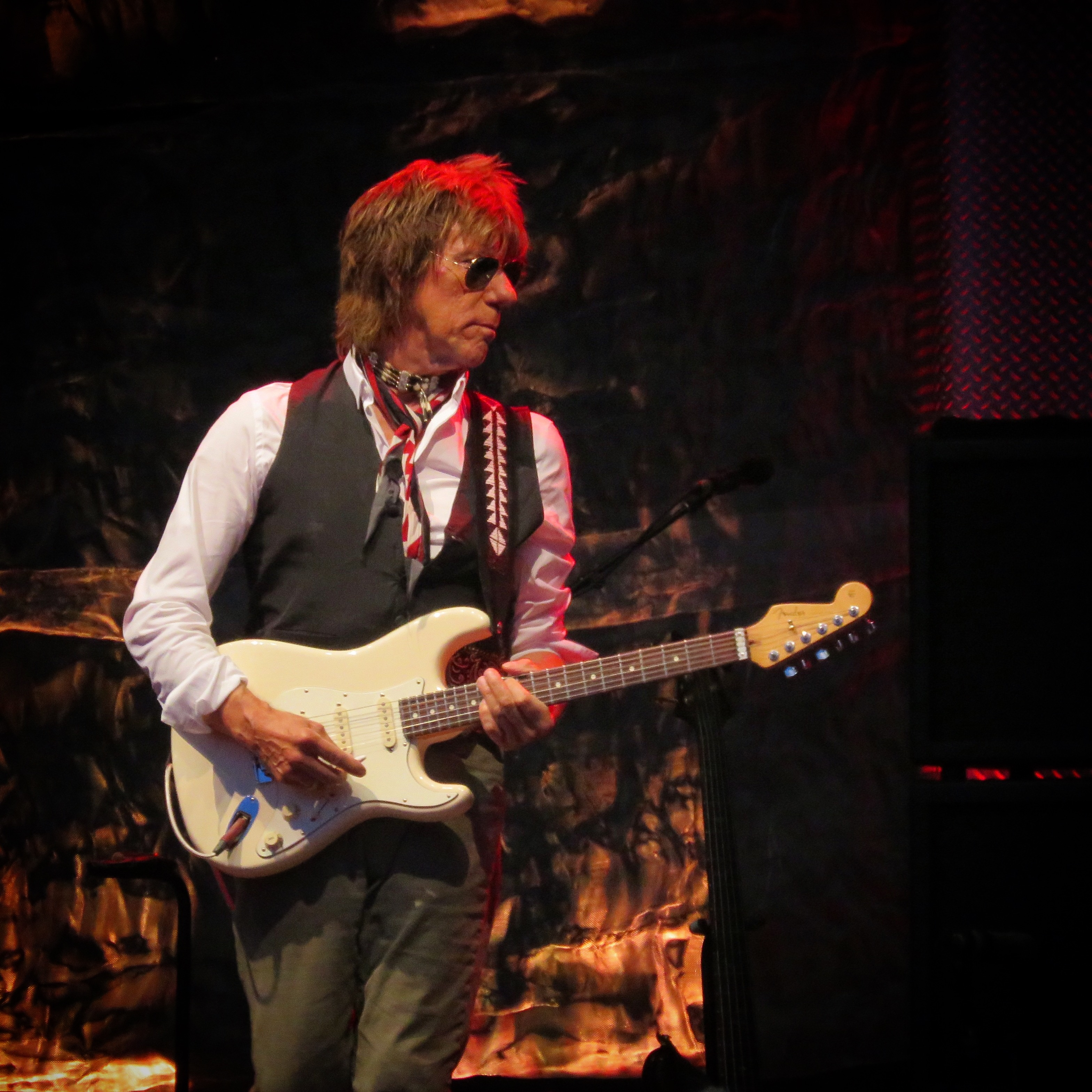
Beck performing live on a Fender Stratocaster with reversed headstock in 2016

The guitar model Beck is most associated with is the Fender Stratocaster, which he started playing in 1969. In a 2013 interview, Beck said, "The Fender Stratocaster was made for me. I believe it was. [...] It's the tool for rock'n'roll. Nothing they can do to it will make it any better than it's already been."

In 1987, Beck had asked that the newly opened Fender Custom Shop make a Stratocaster guitar to his specifications. The resulting guitar became known for its graffiti yellow colour, to match Beck's 1932 Ford Hot Rod. Based on these specifications, Fender released the "Strat Plus", as Beck had vetoed the use of his name to market that model. However, in 1991, Fender did release a Jeff Beck Stratocaster with some of those same features, which as of 2026 has been on the market continuously, with updates at various times, and particularly significant changes made in 2001. An additional Jeff Beck Custom Shop Stratocaster was released in 2004.

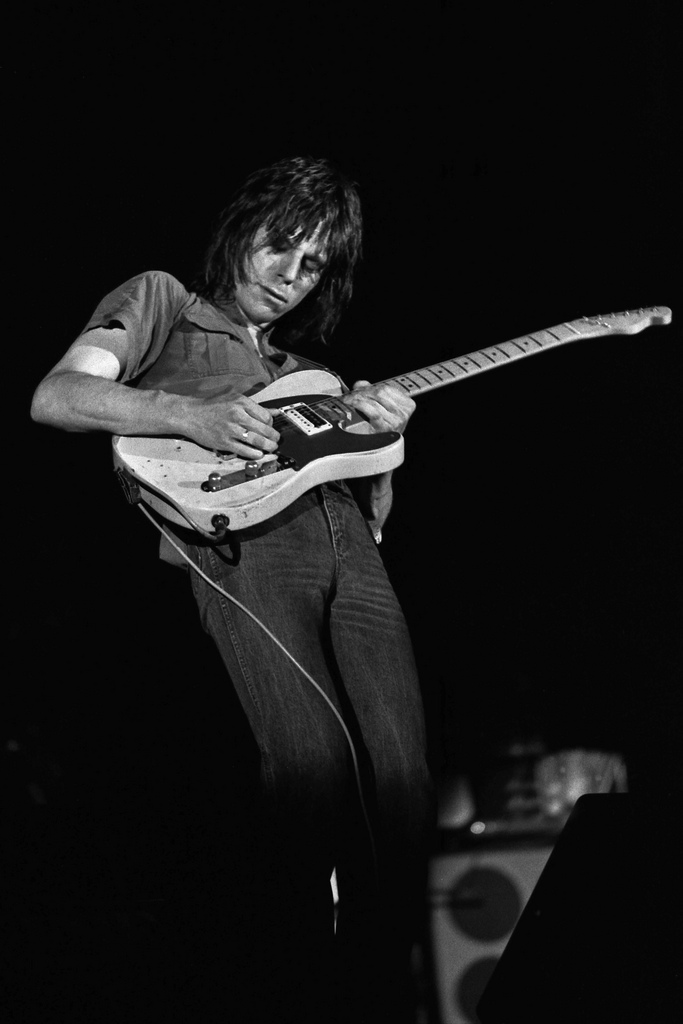
Beck playing a Fender Telecaster in 1979

Beck also played Fender Telecaster and Gibson Les Paul instruments, and continued to play these for special occasions even after the 1990s, when he had transitioned to the Stratocaster as his main instrument for live performances. Gibson released the limited edition Jeff Beck 1954 Les Paul Oxblood model in two different finishes in 2009.

Beck's amplifiers were primarily Fender and Marshall. In his earlier days with the Yardbirds, Beck also used a 1954 Fender Esquire guitar (now owned by Seymour W. Duncan and housed in the Cleveland Rock and Roll Hall of Fame) through Vox AC30s. He also played through a variety of fuzz pedals and echo units along with this set-up and used the Pro Co RAT distortion pedal. The pickup is based on a Gibson pickup rewound by Duncan and used in a salvaged Telecaster dubbed the "Tele-Gib" which he had constructed as a gift to Beck. Scott Morgan of the Rationals, who at one point shared a dressing room with the Yardbirds, recalls how Beck amplified his lead guitar through a Vox Super Beatle while using banjo strings for the unwound G string on his guitar because "they didn't make sets with an unwound G at that point."

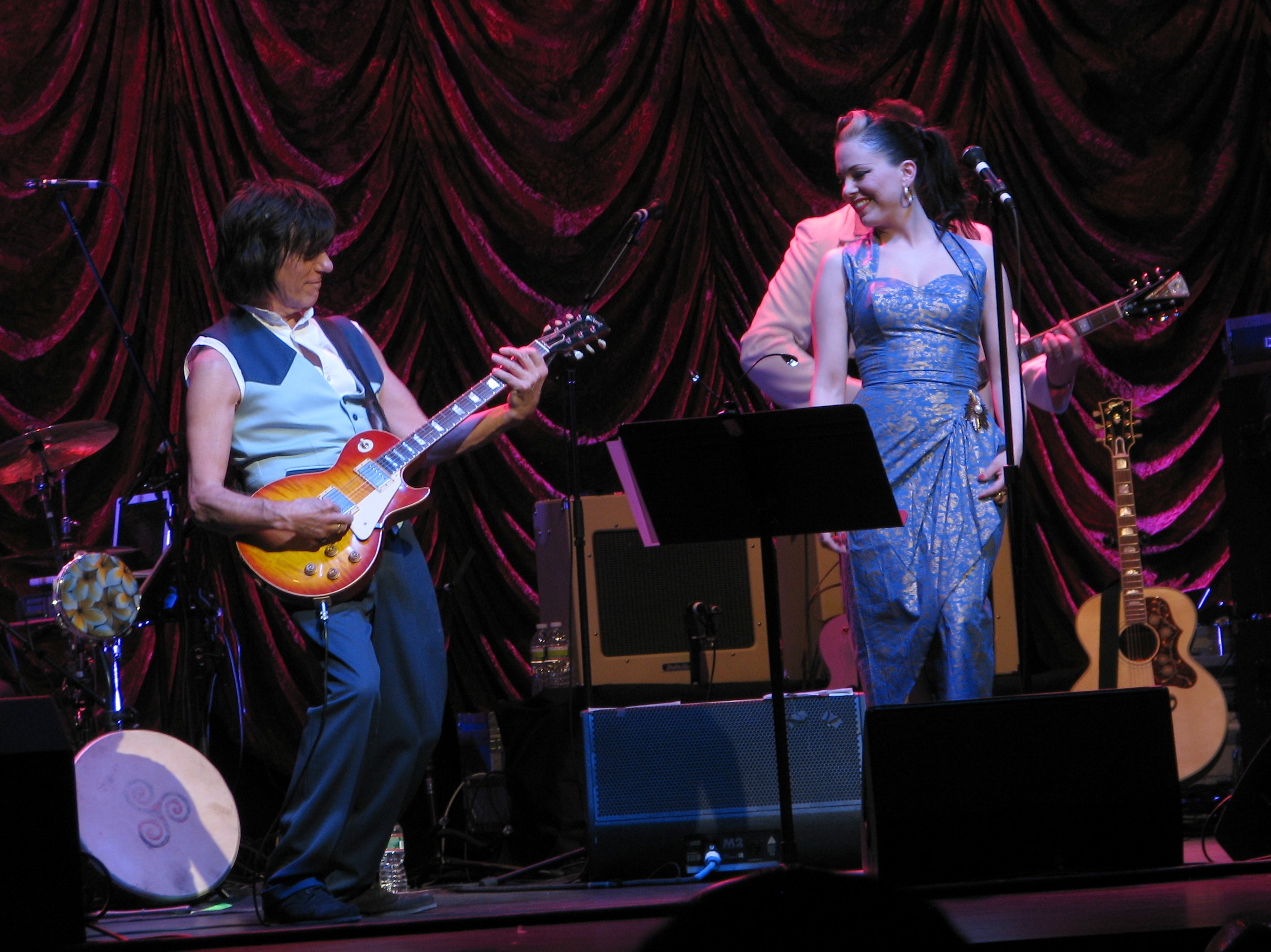
A Gibson Les Paul being played by Beck as he performs covers of Les Paul songs with Imelda May

Beck stopped the regular use of a guitar pick in the 1980s. He produced a wide variety of sounds on the Stratocaster by using his thumb to pluck the guitar strings, his ring finger on the volume knob, and his little finger on the vibrato bar. By plucking a string and then 'fading in' the sound with the volume knob he created a unique sound that can resemble a human voice, among other effects. He frequently used wah-wah pedals and slides both live and in the studio. Eric Clapton once said, "With Jeff, it's all in his hands".

Ninety of Beck's guitars were auctioned by Christie's on London on 22 January 2025, along with over 40 other items from his personal collection. Some of the auctioned items were on public display in Los Angeles and the whole set was shown in London prior to their sale.

== Long term collaborators ==
The graph below includes musicians who have worked on multiple occasions (concerts or published music) with Jeff Beck or for a long time continuously, been on more than one album with him, or have done at least quite a substantial part of a tour with him. Overlap between personnel and albums on this graph does not always mean that that personnel was present on that album as some parallel projects overlapped in time.

== Personal life ==
From 1963 to 1967, Beck was married to Patricia Brown. (Note: Biographer Carson states, "Beck's long-defunct marriage [was] officially laid to rest in 1968".) The relationship deteriorated by the time Beck joined the Yardbirds. During the Yardbirds years, Beck began an affair with American model and actress Mary Hughes, with whom he moved in when his relationship with the band broke down. In 1968, Beck entered what would be a nearly 18-year relationship with the English model Celia Hammond, whose portrait appears on the Truth album cover. In 2005, he married Sandra Cash. Beck had no children.

Beck became a vegetarian in 1969 and was a patron of the Folly Wildlife Rescue Trust.

He had an interest in classic Ford hot rods, undertaking much of the work on the exteriors and engines of the cars himself.

During the mid-1970s, Beck moved in a Grade II-listed building called Riverhall in the civil parish of Wadhurst, East Sussex, where he lived for the rest of his life.

== Death ==
Beck died from a bacterial meningitis infection at a hospital near his residence on 10 January 2023, at the age of 78.

Within minutes of his death announcement, musicians and friends began paying tribute; Jimmy Page wrote that "The six stringed Warrior is no longer here for us to admire the spell he could weave around our mortal emotions. Jeff could channel music from the ethereal. His technique unique. His imaginations apparently limitless. Jeff I will miss you along with your millions of fans." Mick Jagger expressed his condolences, writing "With the death of Jeff Beck we have lost a wonderful man and one of the greatest guitar players in the world. We will all miss him so much." Ronnie Wood, a former bandmate of Beck, stated, "Now Jeff has gone. I feel like one of my band of brothers has left this world, and I'm going to dearly miss him."

Beck's funeral service took place at St Mary's Church in Beddington, Sutton, on 3 February. Mourners included Johnny Depp, Rod Stewart, Eric Clapton, Tom Jones, Ronnie Wood, David Gilmour, Bob Geldof, Robert Plant, and Chrissie Hynde. Jimmy Page delivered a eulogy referring to Beck as "the quiet chief". A private burial, with only Beck's widow Sandra, the couple's dog, and Depp in attendance, followed at Riverhall.

== Awards and nominations ==
Beck was the winner of eight Grammy awards, the first being Best Rock Instrumental Performance for "Escape" from the album Flash at the 1986 Grammys.

The asteroid 38431 Jeffbeck is named after him.

=== Grammy Awards ===
Career Grammy Nominations/Wins
Year	Nominee / work	Award	Result
1977	Wired	Best Pop Instrumental Performance	Nominated
1986	Escape	Best Rock Instrumental Performance	Won
1990	Jeff Beck's Guitar Shop	Best Rock Instrumental Performance	Won
1993	Hound Dog	Best Rock Instrumental Performance	Nominated
1994	Hi-Heel Sneakers	Best Rock Instrumental Performance	Nominated
2000	A Day in the Life	Best Pop Instrumental Performance	Nominated
2000	What Mama Said	Best Rock Instrumental Performance	Nominated
2002	Dirty Mind	Best Rock Instrumental Performance	Won
2004	Plan B	Best Rock Instrumental Performance	Won
2010	A Day in the Life	Best Rock Instrumental Performance	Won
2011	Imagine	Best Pop Collaboration with Vocals	Won
2011	Nessun Dorma	Best Pop Instrumental Performance	Won
2011	Hammerhead	Best Rock Instrumental Performance	Won
2011	I Put a Spell on You	Best Rock Performance by a Duo or Group with Vocals	Nominated
2011	Emotion & Commotion	Best Rock Album	Nominated
2012	Rock 'N' Roll Party Honoring Les Paul	Best Rock Album	Nominated
2023	Patient Number 9	Best Rock Performance	Nominated

== Discography ==
=== Studio albums ===
- Truth (1968)
- Beck-Ola (1969) – by the Jeff Beck Group
- Rough and Ready (1971) – by the Jeff Beck Group
- Jeff Beck Group (1972) – by the Jeff Beck Group
- Blow by Blow (1975)
- Wired (1976)
- There & Back (1980)
- Flash (1985)
- Jeff Beck's Guitar Shop (1989)
- Who Else! (1999)
- You Had It Coming (2001)
- Jeff (2003)
- Emotion & Commotion (2010)
- Loud Hailer (2016)

=== Collaborative albums ===
- Beck, Bogert & Appice (1973) – by Beck, Bogert & Appice
- Jeff Beck with the Jan Hammer Group Live (1977)
- The Honeydrippers: Volume One (1984) – with the Honeydrippers
- Frankie's House (1992) – with Jed Leiber
- Crazy Legs (1993) – with the Big Town Playboys
- 18 (2022) – with Johnny Depp

== Bibliography ==
- Carson, Annette (2001). Jeff Beck: Crazy Fingers. Backbeat Books. ISBN 978-0-87930-632-8.
- Foster, Mo; Cunningham, Mark (2000) [1997]. 17 Watts?: The Birth of British Rock Guitar. Sanctuary. ISBN 978-1-86074-267-5.
- Hjort, Christopher; Hinman, Doug (2000). Jeff's Book :A Chronology of Jeff Beck's Career 1965–1980: From the Yardbirds to Jazz-Rock. Rock 'n' Roll Research Press. ISBN 978-0-9641005-3-4.
- Heslam, David (1992). The NME Rock'n'Roll Years. Hamlyn. ISBN 978-0-600-57602-0.
- Joynson, Vernon (1998). The Tapestry of Delights – The Comprehensive Guide to British Music of the Beat, R&B, Psychedelic and Progressive Eras (3rd ed.). Borderline. ISBN 978-1-899855-09-4.
- Mason, Nick; Dodd, Philip (2005). Inside Out: A Personal History of Pink Floyd. Chronicle Books. ISBN 978-0-8118-4824-4.
- Power, Martin (2012) [2011]. Hot Wired Guitar: The Life of Jeff Beck (e-book). Omnibus Press. ISBN 978-0-85712-810-2.
