= Flash (Jeff Beck album) =

Studio album by Jeff Beck
- Released: 8 July 1985
- Genres: Pop rock; dance-rock; funk rock; dance; pop; funk metal; electronic
- Length: 41:09
- Label: Epic/CBS
- Producers: Jeff Beck; Tony Hymas; Nile Rodgers; Arthur Baker

Jeff Beck chronology
There & Back (1980)	Flash (1985)	Jeff Beck's Guitar Shop (1989)

Singles from Flash
- 1. "Ambitious" / "Nighthawks" / "Escape" Released: 1985; 2. "Gets Us All in the End" Released: 1985; 3. "Stop, Look and Listen" / "You Know, We Know" Released: 1985; 4. "People Get Ready" / "Back on the Streets" Released: 1985

Flash is the fifth studio album by guitarist Jeff Beck, released in July 1985 by Epic/CBS Records. The album reached No. 39 on the U.S. Billboard 200 chart as well as reaching the top 60 in four other countries.

Two singles also charted, the first being a reunion with singer Rod Stewart (from the Jeff Beck Group) for a cover of "People Get Ready" by Curtis Mayfield/The Impressions, which reached No. 5 on Billboard's Mainstream Rock and No. 48 on the Hot 100, as well as the top 40 in four other countries. The second single, "Gets Us All in the End", reached No. 20 on Mainstream Rock. The instrumental "Escape" went on to win the award for Best Rock Instrumental Performance at the 1986 Grammys, which was to be Beck's first of many such awards.

== Overview ==
The album is unique for Beck in that it is composed mainly of songs with vocals, save for two instrumentals in the form of "Escape" and "You Know, We Know", written by his longtime collaborators Jan Hammer and Tony Hymas respectively. Designed to be a foray into pop music in order to capitalise on that sound at the time, Flash was produced by Nile Rodgers for that reason. Such was the desire by the record company to score a hit album, Beck uncharacteristically found himself singing on "Get Workin'" and "Night After Night", at the insistence of Rodgers. "Ambitious" and "People Get Ready" feature a rare instance of Beck playing a Jackson Soloist rather than his usual Fender Stratocaster. Despite its success, he has since expressed his disdain for the album, calling it a "record company goof" and "a very sad sort of time" for him.

"Ambitious" had a notable presence on MTV shortly after the album's release, primed by a phenomenon of the era that saw a brief run of multiple cameo appearances within the same video. The opening gag in the video is Donny Osmond trying to land a major audition, followed by an odd assortment of celebrities of the time singing verses or playing an instrument, including TV stars Abby Dalton, Parker Stevenson, and Herve Villechaize, and musicians Dave Alvin, Gerry Beckley, Marilyn McCoo, Jimmy Hall, and Jon Butcher. In addition, Cheech Marin and Al Kooper reprise characters created for the earlier music video for Marin's "Born in East L.A." single, and Herb Alpert appears at the very end, too late to play trumpet.

The CD edition of Flash included two bonus tracks, "Nighthawks" and "Back on the Streets", which were originally released as B-sides. Another track from the album's recording sessions, "Wild Thing" (a cover of The Troggs), was released only as a promo single and never on the album, but would later be featured on Beck's 1991 compilation album Beckology.

== Composition ==
Unlike much of Beck's work, Flash is regarded as a pop outing, and was dubbed a pop rock album by critic Glenn Astarita. According to writer Tom Harrison, the combination of Rodgers, Jimmy Hall and other outsider contributors lends Flash a "high-priced funk-rock foundation." Music writer Michael J. Smitreski wrote that the album forewent the experimental jazz of Beck's preceding work for a "mostly dance-rock" style, while writer John Herald considered the album to be Beck's "return to rock", following his jazz-rock work of the mid-1970s. David Fricke wrote that the album explores "eighties dance music". It has also been described as a work of funk metal by Fricke and Robert Christgau, the latter of whom felt the "funk-metal fusion" was derivative of Duran Duran and Foreigner. Beck described Flash as an attempt to "get commercial in a reachable way" via "decent, guitar pop". He said of his return to rockier music, "I sensed missed expectations from people coming to my concerts, and I was a bit envious of how the rock bands could hop about instead of standing there concentrating."

Several critics noted the album's eclecticism; Evelyn Erskine described it as "[surveying] the various genres Beck has covered throughout his career from jazz-fusion funk to hot guitar rock", while Richard Defendorf wrote that the album delves into "a variety of modern settings, including electronic rhythm 'n' blues, hard rock/heavy metal and funky dance-rock." Brett Millano says the album is dominated by Rodgers' synthesiser arrangements, with many songs profiling "electronic hardware" over Beck's guitar work. He writes: "[Beck] appears in the middle of each song for a guitar solo, then sinks back into the mix." The musician uses a guitar synth on the album, and many tracks are dominated by LinnDrums, which were described by Ward Wilson as "an 80s concession". Beck's guitar work, writes Rick Shefchik, forgoes typically structural notes and chords in favour of tones that "sound like a lawn mower, a jet, a dragster – just about anything that roars."

"Ambitious" – a "Rodgers' funk/strut" – features a "percolating rhythm" and "whistle-bomb squeal", and has been compared to The Fixx. Fricke, noting the basic tune and "jackhammer rhythm", added that Beck's guitar cuts through the polished production "with sawtooth distortion and heat-ray feedback." "Gets Us All in the End" is a disco song with heavy usage of keyboards and background vocals, as well as a hard funk beat and energetic lead guitar. An instrumental, "Escape" fuses the jazz fusion of Beck's earlier collaborations with Hammer with the "techno-funk inclination" of Rodgers' production, and has been dubbed a "dance-floor tune" resembling spy film soundtracks. The Curtis Mayfield cover "People Get Ready" is lent a "purely gospel feel" by Stewart's singing. "Stop, Look and Listen" is a stuttering song that showcases Beck's distorted blues motifs and "air-raid-siren vibrato work" over a Rodgers groove. The "chant-like" "Get Workin'" is one of the album's dance tracks, as is "Ecstasy", which features unpredictable guitar fills from Beck. "You Know, We Know" is an instrumental dominated by Hymas.

== Critical reception ==
Professional ratings
Review scores
Source	Rating
AllMusic	3/5 stars
The Charlotte Observer	4/10
The Encyclopedia of Popular Music	2/5 stars
The Great Rock Discography	4/10
The Rolling Stone Album Guide	3.5/5 stars
The Village Voice	B

Reviewing Flash for The Ottawa Citizen, Evelyn Erskine praised Beck for being "in fine form", highlighting the instrumentals for demonstrating Beck's guitar virtuosity and lauding the choice of singers for the songs, particularly the "tough funk voice" of Jimmy Hall. The Orlando Sentinel writer Richard Defendorf commended Beck for making an effective pop album, drawing attention to his "pretty wild and fiery" guitar parts and the "properly placed vocal backup" that ensure the Beck-sung songs work. He singled out Stewart's performance on "People Get Ready" for particular praise. In Canadian newspaper The Sunday News, Ward Wilson commented that although Flash is not Beck's "landmark LP of this decade" to follow Truth (1968) and Blow by Blow (1975), it is far superior to contemporary efforts by Beck's peers Jimmy Page and Eric Clapton. Michael J. Smitreski of The Morning Call wrote that he initially thought Beck had 'sold out', but found that the album improved with each listening, adding: "Perhaps dance rock is a step in the right direction for Beck after all."

In a more mixed commentary, David Fricke at Rolling Stone called the album "one of Beck's best ever" and praised it as having "awesome guitar prowess and startling commercial daring", but remarked that the collaborations with Rodgers and Baker "almost don't work". The Bellingham Herald writer John Herald wrote that two of the record's best guitar solos resembled Rodgers' former group Chic, while "the worst sounds like Journey". Robert Christgau at The Village Voice wrote that due to Rodgers' production on five songs, Flash is "the best LP of [Beck's] pathologically spotty career".

Writing in The Charlotte Observer, Rick Shefchik did not enjoy Beck's guitar tone nor any of the material except "People Get Ready" and the instrumental "You Know, We Know", and derided the guitarist for treating the former song "as a novelty among his power-blast material". Tom Harrison of The Province wrote that in handing over much of the album's creative control to collaborators, Beck allowed himself to again become "a sideman on his own LP," and although he praised some of the material, he criticised much of the album for sounding like outtakes from Nile Rodgers' work on Mick Jagger's She's the Boss (1985). Edmonton Journal writer James Adams writes that the album came as "something of a disappointment". While he praised Beck's guitar for being "as incendiary and innovating as ever" and highlighted several songs, he considered the heavy amount of collaborators and engineers on the album to result in a "rather cluttered, compromised, unfocused feel as Beck alternately burrows, bursts and blasts his way through vinyl." He also criticised much of the vocals for being "aural roadblocks" to the musician's "guitar pyrotechnics." Brett Milano of Valley Advocate Amherst wrote that fans of Rodgers would appreciate Flash, but fans of Beck would question the level of his input, feeling that his guitar work is compromised by Rodgers' synthesiser arrangements and adding that the album would have been superior with "less trendy dance-club production".

Among retrospective reviews, Stephen Thomas Erlewine at AllMusic described Flash as Beck's "surprisingly successful stab at a pop album" and described "People Get Ready" as "a fine performance". Alan Clayson of Rock: The Rough Guide described Flash as "an album more in keeping with passing trends". J. D. Considine of The New Rolling Stone Album Guide wrote that Rodgers and Baker were responsible for the album being "consistent and accessible", although noted that it only "threw sparks" on "People Get Ready".

== Track listing ==
Side one
No.	Title	Writer(s)	Length
1.	"Ambitious"	Nile Rodgers	4:38
2.	"Gets Us All in the End"	Arthur Baker, Tina B	6:06
3.	"Escape"	Jan Hammer	4:41
4.	"People Get Ready" (featuring Rod Stewart)	Curtis Mayfield	4:54
Total length:			20:02

Side two
No.	Title	Writer(s)	Length
5.	"Stop, Look and Listen"	Rodgers	4:27
6.	"Get Workin'"	Rodgers	3:35
7.	"Ecstasy"	David Bendeth, Simon Climie	3:31
8.	"Night After Night"	Rodgers	3:42
9.	"You Know, We Know"	Tony Hymas	5:35
Total length:			20:50

CD edition bonus tracks
No.	Title	Writer(s)	Length
10.	"Nighthawks"	Rodgers	4:48
11.	"Back on the Streets (Note: Titled "Back on the Street" on the single.)"	Fred Hostetler, Jeff Beck, Karen Lawrence	3:41
Total length:			49:38

== Personnel ==
- Jeff Beck – lead vocals (tracks 6, 8), guitars, producer (tracks 3, 4, 9, 11)
- Jimmy Hall – lead vocals (tracks 1, 2, 5, 7, 10), backing vocals
- Rod Stewart – lead vocals (track 4)
- Karen Lawrence – lead vocals (track 11)
- Jan Hammer – Fairlight CMI (track 3)
- Tony Hymas – keyboards (track 9), producer (track 9)
- Duane Hitchings – keyboards
- Robert Sabino – keyboards
- Carmine Appice – drums
- Jimmy Bralower – drums
- Barry DeSouza – drums
- Tony "Thunder" Smith – drums
- Jay Burnett – percussion
- Doug Wimbish – bass
- Tina B – backing vocals
- Curtis King – backing vocals
- David Simms – backing vocals
- Frank Simms – backing vocals
- George Simms – backing vocals
- David Spinner – backing vocals

Technical

- David Charles – engineering
- Jason Corsaro – engineering
- Eddie DeLena – engineering
- Rob Eaton – engineering
- Chris Lord-Alge – engineering
- Tom Lord-Alge – engineering
- Eric Mohler – engineering
- Tony Tavener – engineering
- Nigel Walker – engineering
- Andy Wallace – engineering
- Nile Rodgers – producer (tracks 1, 3, 5, 6, 8, 10)
- Arthur Baker – producer (tracks 2, 7)

== Charts ==
Chart (1985)	Peak position
Australian Albums (Kent Music Report)	36
Canada Top Albums/CDs (RPM)	39
Dutch Albums (Album Top 100)	43
German Albums (Offizielle Top 100)	60
Japanese Albums (Oricon)	13
New Zealand Albums (RMNZ)	34
Swedish Albums (Sverigetopplistan)	27
UK Albums (Official Charts)	83
US Billboard 200	39

== Awards ==
Event	Title	Award	Result
1986 Grammys	"Escape"	Best Rock Instrumental Performance	Won
