= Rock 'n' Roll Party (Honoring Les Paul) =

Live album by Jeff Beck
- Released: 22 February 2011
- Recorded: 9 June 2010
- Venue: Iridium Jazz Club (New York City)
- Genre: Rock and Roll, jazz
- Length: 61:44
- Label: Atlantic

Rock 'n' Roll Party (Honoring Les Paul) is a live album by Jeff Beck, recorded as a tribute album to the late guitarist Les Paul.

The album is recorded at the Iridium Jazz Club in New York City where Les Paul played almost every week until his death in August 2009. It was recorded on 9 June 2010, which would have been Les Paul's 95th birthday. The songs played were popular hits from the 1950s and 1960s, including many songs Les Paul played himself. Jeff Beck is joined by Imelda May and her band, in addition to Jason Rebello, Brian Setzer, Trombone Shorty and Gary U.S. Bonds. On some of the songs, May sings together with a pre-recorded voice of herself, imitating the recording technique used on songs sung by Les Paul's wife Mary Ford.

The DVD has been certified gold in Canada as of November 2011.

== CD track listing ==
No.	Title	Writer(s)	Length
1.	"Double Talking Baby" (feat. Darrel Higham)	Danny Wolfe	2:08
2.	"Cruisin'" (feat. Darrel Higham)	Gene Vincent, Bill Davis	2:13
3.	"The Train It Kept a Rollin'" (feat. Darrel Higham)	Tiny Bradshaw; Lois Mann; Howie Kay	2:36
4.	"Cry Me a River" (feat. Imelda May and Jason Rebello)	Arthur Hamilton	2:46
5.	"How High the Moon" (feat. Imelda May)	Nancy Hamilton; Morgan 'Buddy' Lewis	2:10
6.	"Sitting on Top of the World" (feat. Imelda May)	Raymond Brost (Ray Henderson); Joe Young; Samuel Levine (Sam M. Lewis)	2:23
7.	"Bye Bye Blues" (feat. Imelda May)	Fred Hamm; Dave Bennett; Bert Lown; Chauncey Gray	2:12
8.	"The World Is Waiting for the Sunrise" (feat. Imelda May)	Ernest Seitz	2:21
9.	"Vaya Con Dios" (feat. Imelda May)	Buddy Pepper; Inez James; Larry Russell	2:57
10.	"Mockin' Bird Hill" (feat. Imelda May)	George Vaughn Horton	2:23
11.	"I'm a Fool to Care" (feat. Imelda May)	Ted Daffan	2:59
12.	"Tiger Rag" (feat. Imelda May)	Nick LaRocca; Eddie Edwards; Henry Ragas; Tony Sbarbaro; Larry Shields; Harry DaCosta	2:22
13.	"Peter Gunn" (feat. Jason Rebello and Trombone Shorty)	Enrico Nicola "Henry" Mancini	4:49
14.	"Rocking Is Our Business" (feat Darrel Higham-Vocals, Rhythm Guitar, Jason Rebello-keys and Lou Green-sax)	Gene Gilbeaux; Don Hill; Claude Trenier; Cliff Trenier	3:38
15.	"Apache"	Jerry Lordan	3:07
16.	"Sleep Walk"	Santo Farina; Johnny Farina	2:50
17.	"New Orleans" (feat. Gary U.S. Bonds and Jason Rebello)	Frank Guida; Joseph F. Royster	4:34
18.	"Walking in the Sand" (feat. Imelda May)	George "Shadow" Morton	4:39
19.	"Please Mr. Jailer" (feat. Imelda May)	Wynona Carr	4:54
20.	"Twenty Flight Rock" (feat. Brian Setzer)	Ned Fairchild; Eddie Cochran	3:44

Japanese bonus tracks
No.	Title	Writer(s)	Length
21.	"The Girl Can't Help It" (feat. Darrel Higham and Jason Rebello)	Bobby Troup	3:29
22.	"Rock Around the Clock" (feat. Darrel Higham)	Max C. Freedman; James E. Myers (as Jimmy DeKnight)	2:32

== DVD Track listing ==
1. "Baby Let's Play House" (Feat. Darrel Higham)
2. "Double Talking Baby" (Feat. Darrel Higham) – 2:08
3. "Cruisin'" (Feat. Darrel Higham) 2:13"
4. "The Train It Kept A Rollin'" (Feat. Darrel Higham)
5. "Poor Boy" (Feat. Imelda May)
6. "Cry Me A River" (Feat. Imelda May and Jason Rebello)
7. "My Baby Left Me" (Feat. Imelda May)
8. "How High The Moon" (Feat. Imelda May)
9. "Sitting on Top of the World" (Feat. Imelda May)
10. "Bye Bye Blues" (Feat. Imelda May)
11. "The World Is Waiting for the Sunrise" (Feat. Imelda May)
12. "Vaya Con Dios" (Feat. Imelda May)
13. "Mockin' Bird Hill" (Feat. Imelda May)
14. "I'm A Fool To Care" (Feat. Imelda May)
15. "Tiger Rag" (Feat. Imelda May)
16. "Peter Gunn" (Feat. Jason Rebello and Trombone Shorty)
17. "Rocking Is Our Business" (Feat. Darrel Higham, Jason Rebello And Trombone Shorty)
18. "Apache"
19. "Sleep Walk"
20. "New Orleans" (Feat. Gary U.S. Bonds and Jason Rebello)
21. "Walking in the Sand" (Feat. Imelda May)
22. "Please Mr. Jailer" (Feat. Imelda May)
23. "Casting My Spell on You" (Feat. Imelda May and Darrel Higham)
24. "Twenty Flight Rock" (Feat. Brian Setzer)
25. "The Girl Can't Help It" (Feat. Darrel Higham and Jason Rebello)
26. "Rock Around the Clock" (Feat. Darrel Higham)
27. "Shake Rattle and Roll" (Feat. Darrel Higham, Brian Setzer, Jason Rebello and Trombone Shorty)
