= This Is a Song for Miss Hedy Lamarr =

Single by Jeff Beck and Johnny Depp

from the album 18
- Released: 9 June 2022
- Genre: Rock
- Length: 4:30
- Label: Rhino
- Songwriters: Johnny Depp; Tommy Henriksen
- Producer: Ben Findlay

"This Is a Song for Miss Hedy Lamarr" is a song by English rock guitarist Jeff Beck and American actor, producer and musician Johnny Depp released as the lead single from their collaborative studio album 18 (2022). The single was released on 9 June 2022 and was written by Depp and American musician Tommy Henriksen, who is a member of the supergroup Hollywood Vampires which was co-founded by Depp in 2012.

An accompanying music video for "This Is a Song for Miss Hedy Lamarr", was released on 9 June 2022. The song was performed by Beck and Depp during their 2022 European tour.

== Background ==
Beck and Depp first met in 2016 and quickly got along very well, forming a close friendship. They started recording music together in 2019 and released their first collaborative single, a cover version of John Lennon's "Isolation" on 11 April 2020. On 9 June 2022, nine days after the verdict in Depp's highly publicised defamation trial against Amber Heard, the duo released the first official single from the album, the song "This Is a Song for Miss Hedy Lamarr", which has been described as an ode to Austrian-American actress and inventor Hedy Lamarr. The lyrical content appears to be semi-autobiographical, resonating with Depp's own story and image in the years after his divorce from Amber Heard.
