= Loud Hailer (album) =

Studio album by Jeff Beck
- Released: 15 July 2016
- Length: 45:04
- Label: ATCO
- Producers: Jeff Beck, Filippo Cimatti

Jeff Beck chronology
Emotion & Commotion (2010)	Loud Hailer (2016)	18 (2022)

Loud Hailer is the eleventh and final studio album by guitarist Jeff Beck, released on 15 July 2016 on Atco Records.

== Reception ==
The album was positively received by critics and fans. Although it initially charted in the top 50 in many countries, sales were disappointing.

== Track listing ==
All tracks written by Jeff Beck, Carmen Vandenberg and Rosie Bones, except where noted. Vandenberg and Bones are two of the members of Bones UK.

1. "The Revolution Will Be Televised" – 3:53
2. "Live in the Dark" – 3:47
3. "Pull It" (Jeff Beck, Filippo Cimatti) – 2:09
4. "Thugs Club" – 5:15
5. "Scared for the Children" – 6:07
6. "Right Now" – 3:57
7. "Shame" – 4:40
8. "Edna" (Jeff Beck) – 1:03
9. "The Ballad of the Jersey Wives" – 3:50
10. "O.I.L. (Can't Get Enough of That Sticky)" – 4:41
11. "Shrine" – 5:47

== Personnel ==
- Jeff Beck – guitars
- Carmen Vandenberg – guitars
- Rosie Bones – vocals
- Davide Sollazzi – drums
- Giovanni Pallotti – bass

== Charts ==
Chart performance for Loud Hailer
Chart (2016)	Peak position
Australian Albums (ARIA)	38
Austrian Albums (Ö3 Austria)	25
Belgian Albums (Ultratop Flanders)	58
Belgian Albums (Ultratop Wallonia)	29
Canadian Albums (Billboard)	95
Dutch Albums (Album Top 100)	42
French Albums (SNEP)	77
German Albums (Offizielle Top 100)	23
Italian Albums (FIMI)	63
New Zealand Heatseeker Albums (RMNZ)	5
Scottish Albums (Official Charts)	15
Swiss Albums (Schweizer Hitparade)	11
UK Albums (Official Charts)	27
US Billboard 200	41
