= Isolation (John Lennon song) =

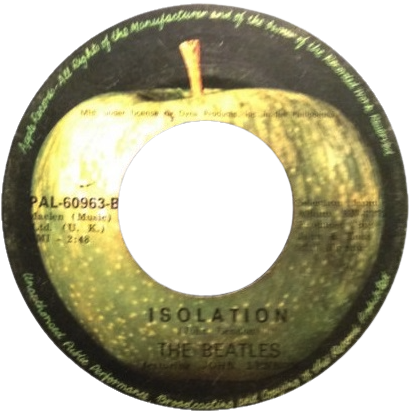
- "Isolation" was issued as the B-side to "Mother" in the Philippines

Song by John Lennon

from the album John Lennon/Plastic Ono Band
- Released: 11 December 1970
- Recorded: 6 October 1970
- Studio: EMI, London
- Genre: Blues
- Length: 2:51
- Label: Apple/EMI
- Songwriter(s): John Lennon
- Producer(s): John Lennon, Yoko Ono, Phil Spector

"Isolation" is a 1970 song appearing on John Lennon's first official solo album release, John Lennon/Plastic Ono Band. It ends side one of the album, and is the fifth track. In the Philippines, Apple Records released "Isolation" as the B-side to "Mother", the single off John Lennon/Plastic Ono Band, in contrast to most countries where the B-side was Yoko Ono's "Why". It was also released on an EP in Mexico along with "Mother", "Look at Me" and "My Mummy's Dead".

== Lyrics and music ==
At the time, Lennon began to feel disillusioned with fame and where his life was heading, with the break-up of the Beatles, the attacks he and Yoko Ono were facing at the time, as well as acute insecurity and self-doubt brought on through his extensive drug use. "Isolation" reveals Lennon's feelings of vulnerability, despite his fame and fortune. Beatles biographer John Blaney sees this as continuing the theme of the album, as Lennon strips away another layer of myth that hides the true reality. Blaney sees this revelation as being particularly painful for Lennon, for whom belonging and acceptance was very important.

The lyrics begin by stating that even though he and Ono seem to have everything, they are still as lonely and isolated as everyone else. The second verse focuses on the couple's political activism, which many oppose generating even further isolation. The third verse generalizes the situation further. Lennon acknowledges that the people who have caused his pain can't be blamed, since we are all part of the same irrational world, and thus we are all victims of the world's insanity. This verse borrows from an older song, Barrett Strong's "Oh I Apologize", the B-side to his 1959 single "Money (That's What I Want)". In "Oh I Apologize", Strong sang "I don't expect you to take me back/after I've caused you so much pain." The third verse of "Isolation" begins "I don't expect you to understand/After you caused so much pain" before noting that the listener is not to blame. The fourth and final verse puts people's fears of each other and even of the sun into the context of a universe in which the sun is permanent but our world may not be.

Musicologist Wilfrid Mellers describes "Isolation" as an "Anglicized version of Negro piano blues." The instrumentation begins with just drums and piano backing Lennon's vocals. When Lennon's vocals become more emotional, an organ is added to the instrumentation. The instrumentation also includes bass, played by Klaus Voormann. Mellers points out that the song's mood of isolation is intensified by the "bare, open fifths" played by the piano and by the silences incorporated into the sad melody. He also notes that the pain communicated by the song is enhanced by the dissonances in the music, particularly the use of semitone intervals. According to Mellers, the portion of the third verse in which Lennon sings that "You're just a human/a victim of the insane" is effectively intensified by the contrasting semitones of F♯ against F and by harmonizing F with a dominant seventh chord on C instead of with a D major chord.

== Recording ==
Recorded at EMI Studios on 6 October 1970, Lennon double-tracked his vocals for the middle section, which were panned to each side in stereo. The song's organ part is heard most clearly immediately prior to the final verses. Ringo Starr plays the drums and Klaus Voormann provides the bass guitar. An outtake of "Isolation", including a broken-down attempt, can be heard on the John Lennon Anthology box set.

== Personnel ==
- John Lennon – vocals, piano, organ
- Klaus Voormann – bass guitar
- Ringo Starr – drums

== Reception ==
Mellers regards Lennon's achievement in creating African-American-style blues as an Englishman as being equivalent to that of Bob Dylan's creating such blues songs as a white American. Ben Urish and Ken Bielen describe "Isolation" as "direct and moving" and praise Lennon's vocal as being both "animated and nuanced." Music journalist Paul Du Noyer does not rank "Isolation" among Lennon's best songs but feels that it "transcends the well-worn 'lonely at the top' trap" by generalizing the emotions to those that many people feel at times.

Stereogum contributors Timothy and Elizabeth Bracy rated it as Lennon's 6th best solo song, saying that it seems "to wearily recognize absolute loneliness as an inevitable condition of the human experience" and features a "beautiful, ascending piano line reminiscent of nothing so much as Duke Ellington's breathtaking standard 'In a Sentimental Mood'." Far Out critic Tim Coffman rated it as Lennon's 4th greatest deep cut, saying "Using a constantly shifting chord progression, Lennon takes us through the different thoughts that permeated his mind in the 1970s, being afraid of not ending up with anyone at the end of the day. While he eventually finds his bliss with Yoko, Lennon empathises with those who feel alone in the world, sounding world-weary as he delivers the main chorus line."
