= Blow by Blow =

Studio album by Jeff Beck
- Released: March 1975
- Recorded: October 1974
- Studios: AIR, London
- Genres: Jazz fusion; instrumental rock
- Length: 44:35
- Label: Epic
- Producer: George Martin

Jeff Beck chronology
Live in Japan (1973)	Blow by Blow (1975)	Wired (1976)

Professional ratings
Review scores
Source	Rating
AllMusic	4.5/5 stars
PopMatters	(positive)
Rolling Stone	(mixed)
The Rolling Stone Album Guide	4/5 stars

Blow by Blow is Jeff Beck's first album credited to him as a solo artist. It was recorded in October 1974 and released via Epic Records in 1975. An instrumental album, it peaked at No. 4 on the American Billboard 200 and was certified platinum by the RIAA.

== Background and content ==
After the dissolution of the power trio Beck, Bogert & Appice (BBA) in spring 1974, Beck took time for session work with other groups. In December, a half-hearted "audition" for The Rolling Stones took place, with Beck jamming blues with the band for one day, before realising their musical styles were not compatible. In a 2010 interview with Alice Cooper, Beck quoted; “Me and Keith (Richards) would have never got on.”

During this period, Beck decided to record an all-instrumental album, bringing back keyboardist Max Middleton from the second Jeff Beck Group. He hired George Martin to produce after hearing his work with the Mahavishnu Orchestra's 1974 album Apocalypse. According to Carmine Appice, who played with Beck in BBA, he was involved in the writing and recording process of Blow by Blow but Appice's parts were edited out after a dispute with Beck's management. The fourth key contributor to Blow by Blow after Beck, Middleton, and Martin was Stevie Wonder, who gave Beck his songs "Cause We've Ended as Lovers" and "Thelonius", with Wonder playing clavinet on the latter uncredited. The former song appeared on Wonder's 1974 album Stevie Wonder Presents: Syreeta, made with then-wife Syreeta Wright, while Wonder never recorded "Thelonius" himself. A cover of the Beatles song "She's a Woman" was selected, as well as the composition "Diamond Dust" by Bernie Holland of the group Hummingbird consisting of musicians from the second Beck Group. The other five tracks were band originals with Beck and Middleton the main writers, and the last track on each side featured string arrangements by Martin. Beck dedicated "Cause We've Ended as Lovers" to fellow guitarist Roy Buchanan, with an acknowledgement to Wonder.

== Release ==
Blow by Blow was released in March 1975. It was a hit in the US, reaching number four on the Billboard album charts, eventually selling a million copies. It remains Beck's highest-charting album.

On 27 March 2001, a remastered edition for compact disc was reissued by Legacy Records, Epic and its parent label Columbia Records now a division of Sony Music Entertainment.

A live version of the track "Scatterbrain" was featured in the video game Guitar Hero 5.

== Track listing ==
Side one
No.	Title	Writer(s)	Length
1.	"You Know What I Mean"	Jeff Beck; Max Middleton	4:02
2.	"She's a Woman"	John Lennon; Paul McCartney	4:28
3.	"Constipated Duck"	Jeff Beck	2:50
4.	"AIR Blower"	Jeff Beck; Max Middleton; Richard Bailey; Phil Chen	5:07
5.	"Scatterbrain"	Jeff Beck; Max Middleton	5:39
Total length:			22:27

Side two
No.	Title	Writer(s)	Length
1.	"Cause We've Ended as Lovers" (dedicated to Roy Buchanan and thanks to Stevie)	Stevie Wonder	5:51
2.	"Thelonius"	Stevie Wonder	3:17
3.	"Freeway Jam"	Max Middleton	4:57
4.	"Diamond Dust"	Bernie Holland	8:24
Total length:			22:41

== Personnel ==
Musicians

- Jeff Beck – guitars
- Max Middleton – keyboards, clavinet
- Phil Chen – bass (identified as "Phil Chenn")
- Richard Bailey – drums, percussion

Technical

- George Martin – production, orchestral arrangement
- Denim Bridges – engineering

Artwork

- John Berg – design
- John Collier – cover art

== Charts ==
Chart performance for Blow by Blow
Chart (1975)	Peak position
Australian Albums (Kent Music Report)	28
Canada Top Albums/CDs (RPM)	3
Japanese Albums (Oricon)	27
New Zealand Albums (RMNZ)	38
US Billboard 200	4

== Certifications ==
Certifications for Blow by Blow
Region	Certification	Certified units/sales
Canada (Music Canada)	Gold	50,000^{^}
United States (RIAA)	Platinum	1,000,000^{^}
^{^} Shipments figures based on certification alone.

== See also ==
- 1975 in music
- Jeff Beck discography

== Bibliography ==
- Cauffiel, Lowell (November 1975). "Jeff Beck: new directions new dimensions". Guitar Player. Vol. 9, no. 11. Saratoga, CA. pp. 10, 40, 42. ISSN 0017-5463.
- Costa, Jean Charles (November 1976). "Beck don't look back or progress is obsession". Hit Parader. Vol. 35, no. 148. Derby, CT. pp. 26–27, 60–61. ISSN 0162-0266.
- Hickey, Dave (22 July 1976). "Live 'Wired': The Jeff Beck Interview". Circus. No. 136. New York, NY. pp. 22–25. ISSN 0009-7365.
- Power, Martin (2014). Hot Wired: The Life of Jeff Beck (New & Updated ed.). New York: Omnibus Press. ISBN 9781783055920.
- Rohter, Larry (17 June 1977). "Jeff Beck: The Progression Of A True Progressive". DownBeat. Vol. 44, no. 12. Chicago, IL. pp. 13–14, 53. ISSN 0012-5768.
