= Jason Rebello =

British pianist, songwriter, and producer (born 1969)

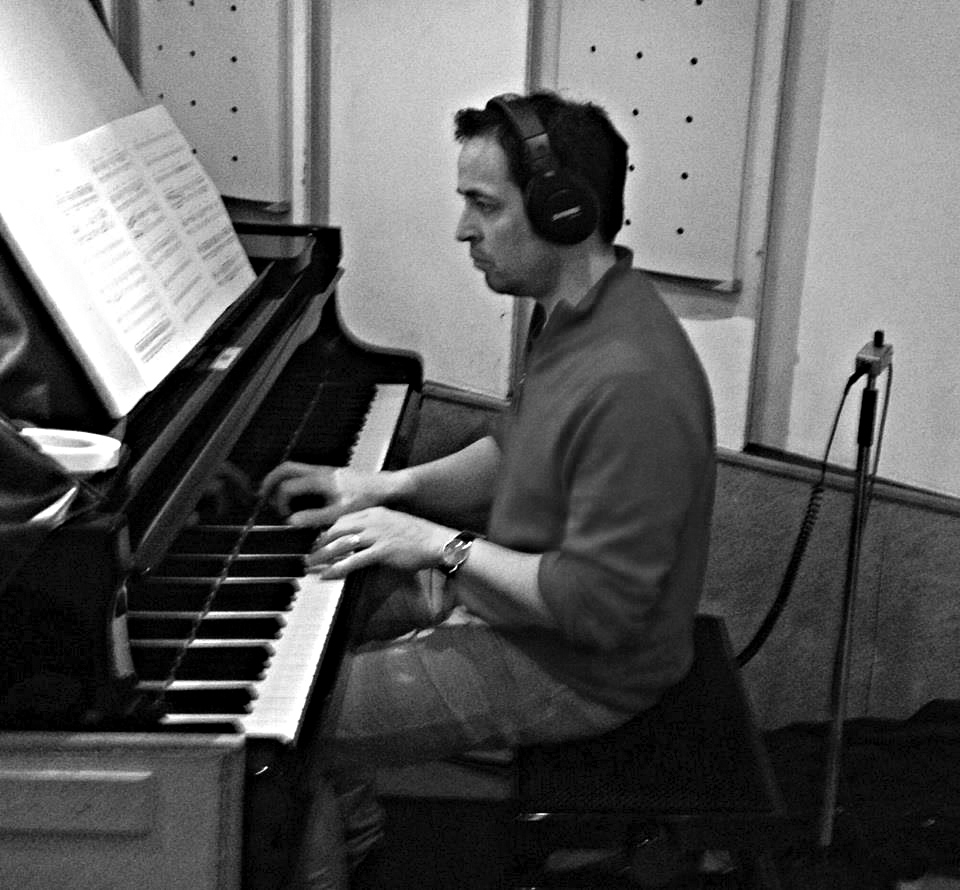

Background information
- Born: Jason Matthew Rebello; 29 March 1969 (age 57); Carshalton, Surrey, England
- Genres: Jazz, pop, rock, soul
- Occupation: Musician
- Instrument: Piano
- Years active: 1988–present
- Labels: Lyte, Sony BMG
- Website: www.jasonrebello.co.uk

Jason Matthew Rebello (born 29 March 1969) is a British pianist, songwriter, and record producer.

== Career ==
Rebello was born in Carshalton, Surrey, England. His father's family is from India. Rebello was raised a Catholic in Wandsworth, London. He was classically trained, beginning at the age of 19 at Guildhall School of Music and Drama.

He emerged in the late 1980s as a jazz pianist influenced by Herbie Hancock and McCoy Tyner. In his early 20s, Rebello recorded three solo albums, beginning with his debut album A Clearer View (1990), which was produced by Wayne Shorter and led to Rebello appearing on the cover of The Wire magazine. He also worked with Jean Toussaint, Tommy Smith, and Branford Marsalis, and presented Artrageous! on BBC television.

In 1998, Sting invited Rebello to join his band following the death of Kenny Kirkland. He toured with Sting for the next six years and recorded three albums. He then became a member of Jeff Beck's band, touring for six years and recording four albums. During these years with Sting and Beck, Rebello also worked with Chaka Khan, Des'ree, Mica Paris, Carleen Anderson, Manu Katché, Phil Collins, and Peter Gabriel.

In May 2013, Rebello told The Huffington Post that after twelve years of touring as a session musician he was now reestablishing himself as a solo artist, specifically in jazz. On 4 November 2013, he released the album Anything But Look on Lyte Records. It features Will Downing, Omar, Joy Rose, Jacob Collier, Tim Garland and Pino Palladino.

Rebello teaches music at his alma mater, Guildhall School of Music, and Bath Spa University. Additionally, he composes music for the London-based production music library, Audio Network.

== Personal life ==
In his mid-20s, Rebello took a break from music to pursue interests in Buddhism. He later stated: "I think this was because I was enjoying a level of success that made me feel increasingly alienated." He is married to long-time partner and wife Justine and has two sons, George and Jacques.

== Awards and honors ==
- Album of the Year, Held, British Jazz Awards, 2016
- British Jazz Awards (piano), 2016

== Discography ==
- A Clearer View (1990)
- Keeping Time (1993)
- Make It Real (1994)
- Last Dance (1995)
- Next Time Round (1999)
- Jazz Rainbow (2007)
- Anything But Look (2013)
- Held (2016)

With Sting

- Brand New Day (1999)
- ...All This Time (2001)
- Sacred Love (2003)

With Tommy Smith

- Peeping Tom (1990)

With Jeff Beck

- Official Bootleg USA '06 (2007)
- Performing this week ... Live at Ronnie Scott's (2008)
- Emotion & Commotion (2010)
- Rock 'n' Roll Party (Honoring Les Paul) (2011)

With Tim Garland

- Life to Life (2023)
