= Jeff Beck's Guitar Shop =

- Cover art by Mark Ryden

Studio album by Jeff Beck
- Released: 2 August 1989
- Studios: The Sol, Cookham
- Genre: Instrumental rock
- Length: 39:51
- Label: Epic
- Producers: Jeff Beck; Tony Hymas; Terry Bozzio; Leif Mases

Jeff Beck chronology
Flash (1985)	Jeff Beck's Guitar Shop (1989)	Beckology (1991)

Singles from Jeff Beck's Guitar Shop
- 1. "Day in the House" / "Guitar Shop" Released: 23 October 1989; 2. "Stand on It" Released: 1989

Professional ratings
Review scores
Source	Rating
AllMusic	4/5 stars

Jeff Beck's Guitar Shop is the sixth studio album by guitarist Jeff Beck, first released in Japan on 2 August 1989, before being released in the UK and US in October 1989 through Epic Records. The album reached No. 49 on the U.S. Billboard 200 and won the award for Best Rock Instrumental Performance at the 32nd Grammy Awards. This was Beck's second album to win that award, after Flash (1985).

"Stand on It" was released as a single and reached No. 35 on Billboard's Mainstream Rock chart. "Sling Shot" was featured in the 1990 horror comedy film Gremlins 2: The New Batch. Several other tracks were used as part of the soundtrack for the 1990 South Atlantic Raiders episodes of the British comedy series The Comic Strip Presents.

In a move away from his previous jazz fusion stylings, Beck adopted a more straightforward instrumental rock approach on Guitar Shop, save for two tracks ("Guitar Shop" and "Day in the House") on which drummer Terry Bozzio provided quirky spoken vocals.

Following Beck's death in 2023, guitarist Brian May described "Where Were You" as "possibly the most beautiful bit of guitar music ever recorded, probably alongside Jimi Hendrix's 'Little Wing'".

== Track listing ==
No.	Title	Music	Length
1.	"Guitar Shop"	Jeff Beck, Terry Bozzio, Tony Hymas	5:03
2.	"Savoy"	Beck, Bozzio, Hymas	3:52
3.	"Behind the Veil"	Hymas	4:55
4.	"Big Block"	Beck, Bozzio, Hymas	4:09
5.	"Where Were You"	Beck, Bozzio, Hymas	3:17
6.	"Stand on It"	Beck, Hymas	4:59
7.	"Day in the House"	Beck, Bozzio, Hymas	5:04
8.	"Two Rivers"	Beck, Bozzio, Hymas	5:25
9.	"Sling Shot"	Beck, Hymas	3:07
Total length:			39:51

== Personnel ==
- Jeff Beck – guitars, production
- Tony Hymas – keyboards (including keyboard bass), synthesizer, production
- Terry Bozzio – drums, percussion, spoken vocals, production

Technical

- Leif Mases – engineering, mixing, production
- Dick Beetham – engineering assistance
- Neil Amor – engineering assistance
- James Allen Jones – engineering assistance
- Chris Drohan – engineering assistance
- Ian Gillespie – mastering

== Charts ==
Chart (1989)	Peak position
Australian Albums (Kent Music Report)	97
Canada Top Albums/CDs (RPM)	75
Japanese Albums (Oricon)	9
US Billboard 200	49

== Certifications ==
Region	Certification	Certified units/sales
Japan (RIAJ)	Gold	100,000^{^}
^{^} Shipments figures based on certification alone.

== Awards ==
Event	Title	Award	Result
1990 Grammys	Jeff Beck's Guitar Shop	Best Rock Instrumental Performance	Won
