= 'Ot 'n' Sweaty =

'Ot 'N' Sweaty

Studio album / Live album by Cactus
- Released: August 28, 1972
- Recorded: 1972
- Genres: Hard rock; blues rock
- Length: 35:53
- Label: Atco
- Producer: Geoffrey Haslam

Cactus chronology
Restrictions (1971)	'Ot 'N' Sweaty (1972)	Cactus V (2006)

Professional ratings
Review scores
Source	Rating
Allmusic	link

'Ot 'n' Sweaty is the fourth album by the American rock band Cactus. It was released in 1972, and would be their last for over three decades. Original members Jim McCarty and Rusty Day had left the group, so bass guitarist Tim Bogert and drummer Carmine Appice were joined by Werner Fritzschings on guitar, Duane Hitchings on keyboards and Peter French (ex-Leaf Hound and Atomic Rooster) on vocals. This was the band's final album before their long hiatus that lasted until 2006. The first three tracks (the first side of the original LP) were recorded live on April 3, 1972, in Puerto Rico at the Mar y Sol Pop Festival, and the rest (the second side of the LP) were recorded in studio (as reflected below the band's name on the album cover: On Stage In Puerto Rico And In The Studio). The pinnacle tracks for this album are "Bad Stuff", "Bringing Me Down", "Bedroom Mazurka", "Telling You" and a live recording of "Let Me Swim", which was a song by the original Cactus on their 1970 debut album.

== Track listing ==
Side one (live tracks)
No.	Title	Writer(s)	Length
1.	"Swim (Let Me Swim)"	Appice, Bogert, Day, McCarty	4:42
2.	"Bad Mother Boogie (Big Mama Boogie – Part II)"	Appice, Bogert, French, Fritzschings, Hitchings	5:21
3.	"Our Lil Rock 'n' Roll Thing"	Appice, Bogert, French, Fritzschings, Hitchings	7:01

Side two
No.	Title	Writer(s)	Length
4.	"Bad Stuff"	French, Johnson	3:11
5.	"Bringing Me Down"	Appice, Bogert, French, Fritzschings, Hitchings	5:25
6.	"Bedroom Mazurka"	French, Hitchings	4:38
7.	"Telling You"	French, Hitchings	5:09
8.	"Underneath the Arches"	Reg Connelly, Bud Flanagan, McCarty	0:26
Total length:			18:49

== Personnel ==
Cactus

- Carmine Appice – drums, backing vocals, percussion
- Tim Bogert – bass, backing vocals
- Werner Fritzschings – guitar
- Peter French – lead and backing vocals
- Duane Hitchings – keyboards, organ, electric and acoustic pianos

Production

- Andree Buchler – Re-release coordinator
- Thierry Amsallem – Re-release coordinator
- Michael Delugg – Engineer
- Jimmy Douglass – Engineer
- Geoffrey Haslam – Producer, remixing, mixing
- Joel Kerr – Engineer
- Bernie Kirsh – Assistant engineer
- Claude Nobs – Re-release coordinator
- David Palmer – Engineer
- Buzz Richmond – Assistant engineer
- Jean Ristori – Mastering
- Tom Scott – Engineer
- Ray Thompson – Engineer
- James E. Vickers – Engineer

== Charts ==
Chart (1972)	Peak position
Canada Top Albums/CDs (RPM)	93
US Billboard 200	162
