= Fully Unleashed: The Live Gigs =

Live album by Cactus
- Released: July 13, 2004
- Recorded: 1970–1972
- Genre: Hard rock; blues rock; boogie rock
- Length: 2:38:20
- Label: Rhino Handmade

Cactus chronology
| Barely Contained: The Studio Sessions (2004) | Fully Unleashed: The Live Gigs (2004) | Fully Unleashed: The Live Gigs Vol. 2 (2007) |

Professional ratings
Review scores
| Source | Rating |
|---|---|
| AllMusic | link |

Fully Unleashed: The Live Gigs is a limited edition double-CD compilation of live material by the American rock supergroup Cactus collected and released by Rhino Handmade in 2004. The compilation includes the original lineup's final show performed in Memphis, Tennessee on December 19, 1971, in its entirety. It also includes tracks performed at the August 28, 1970 Isle of Wight Festival, a June 26, 1971 show at the Gilligan's club in Buffalo, New York, and four tracks from the later 1972 lineup performing at Mar y Sol Pop Festival in Puerto Rico on April 3, 1972. Only 5,000 copies of the compilation were made.

== Track listing ==
Disc One
| No. | Title | Writer(s) | Length |
|---|---|---|---|
| 1. | "Intro/Long Tall Sally" | Robert "Bumps" Blackwell, Enotris Johnson, Richard Penniman | 12:16 |
| 2. | "Bag Drag" | Rusty Day, Jim McCarty | 3:10 |
| 3. | "Evil" | Chester Burnett | 16:11 |
| 4. | "Parchman Farm" | Mose Allison | 6:21 |
| 5. | "Alaska" | Carmine Appice, Tim Bogert, Day | 3:56 |
| 6. | "Oleo" | Appice, Bogert, Day, McCarty | 11:20 |
| 7. | "No Need to Worry" | Appice, Bogert, Day, McCarty | 20:18 |
| 8. | "Let Me Swim" | Appice, Bogert, Day, McCarty | 5:05 |

Disc Two
| No. | Title | Writer(s) | Length |
|---|---|---|---|
| 1. | "Big Mama Boogie - Parts 1 & 2" | Appice, Bogert, Day, McCarty | 15:31 |
| 2. | "Medley: Heeby Jeebies/Money/Hound Dog/What'd I Say" | Michael James Jackson, John Marascalco, Janie Bradford, Berry Gordy Jr., Jerry Leiber, Mike Stoller, Ray Charles | 17:04 |
| 3. | "No Need to Worry" | Appice, Bogert, Day, McCarty | 5:08 |
| 4. | "Parchman Farm" | Allison | 4:30 |
| 5. | "One Way... Or Another" | Appice, Bogert, Day, McCarty | 9:14 |
| 6. | "Bro. Bill" | Appice, Bogert, Day, McCarty | 6:12 |
| 7. | "Swim" | Appice, Bogert, Day, McCarty | 4:44 |
| 8. | "Bad Mother Boogie" | Appice, Bogert, Peter French, Duane Hitchings | 5:25 |
| 9. | "Our Lil Rock-N-Roll Thing" | Appice, Bogert, French, Hitchings | 7:00 |
| 10. | "Bedroom Mazurka" | French, Hitchings | 4:58 |

- Disc 1, Tracks 1–8 and Disc 2, Tracks 1–2 recorded 12/19/1971 at the Ellis Auditorium in Memphis, TN
- Disc 2, Tracks 3–4 recorded 8/28/1970 at the Isle of Wight Festival in East Afton Farm, Isle of Wight, England
- Disc 2, Tracks 5–6 recorded 8/27/1971 at the Gilligan's club in Buffalo, NY
- Disc 2, Tracks 7–10 recorded 4/3/1972 at the Mar y Sol Pop Festival in Puerto Rico

== Personnel ==
- Carmine Appice – drums, percussion, background vocals
- Tim Bogert – bass, background vocals
- Rusty Day – lead vocals
- Jim McCarty – guitar
- Ron Leejack – guitar (Disc 2, Tracks 5–6)
- Werner Fritzsching – guitar (Disc 2, Tracks 7–10)
- Duane Hitchings – organ, piano, electric piano (Disc 2, Tracks 7–10)
- Peter French – lead vocals (Disc 2, Tracks 7–10)
