= Pete French =

British singer (born 1948)

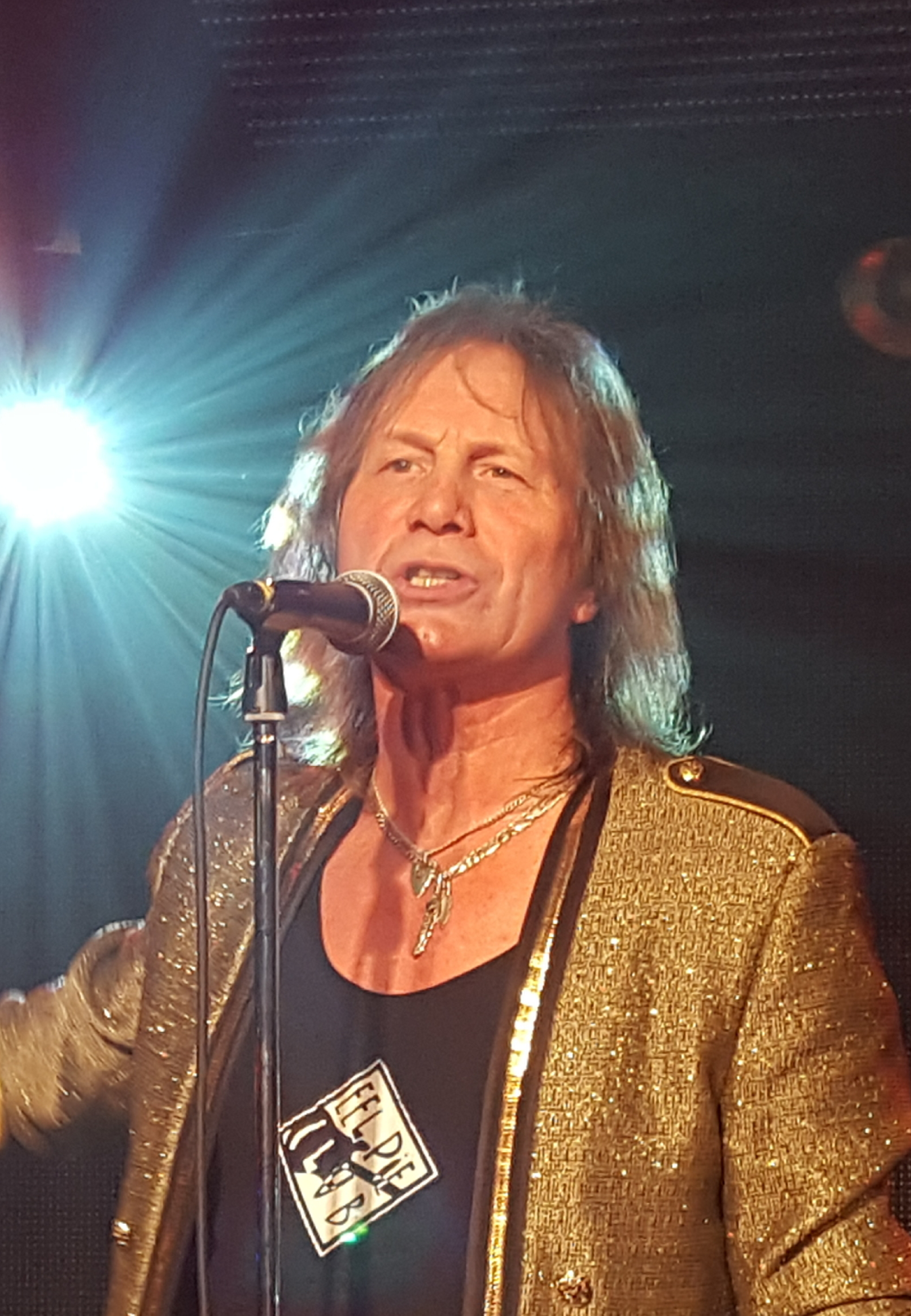
- French in 2018

Background information
- Born: 16 October 1948 (age 77); London, England
- Genre: Rock
- Instrument: Vocals
- Years active: 1960s–1981, 1999, 2004–present
- Formerly of: Leaf Hound, Atomic Rooster, Cactus

Peter French (born 16 October 1948) is a British rock singer-songwriter from London. He was the lead singer for Leaf Hound, and had short tenures in Atomic Rooster and Cactus. French has also worked with Beck, Bogert & Appice (and their drummer Carmine Appice) and Cozy Powell and has performed in bands based in the United Kingdom, United States and Germany.

== Career ==
=== Early career ===
French began his career in the mid 1960s. His first band was The Max Brown Group. Some of French's influences included Elvis Presley, Dion DiMucci, Eddie Cochran, The Beatles, and The Rolling Stones. One of French's first professional bands was a blues band called Joe Poe with his cousin Mick Halls. He sang in clubs around the UK in the mid 1960s with different blues bands including Switch, and Erotic Eel .

In 1968, French and Halls joined Bob Brunning of Fleetwood Mac to record an album as The Brunning Sunflower Band. Halls and French were also a part of Black Cat Bones, which included Paul Kossoff and Simon Kirke of Free. The bands first and only studio album had been recorded before French joined.

=== Leaf Hound ===
When Black Cat Bones disbanded in 1970, the remaining members, including Mick Halls as Pete hired him, formed Leaf Hound. The original lineup recorded their first and only album, Growers of Mushroom, which was released in October 1971, by which time they had already split up. After the band disbanded, French moved to Birmingham, and joined the band Big Bertha, which included Cozy Powell. Feeling that the band wasn't going anywhere, French and Powell both left Big Berha and moved to London, where they lived with each other.

=== Atomic Rooster ===
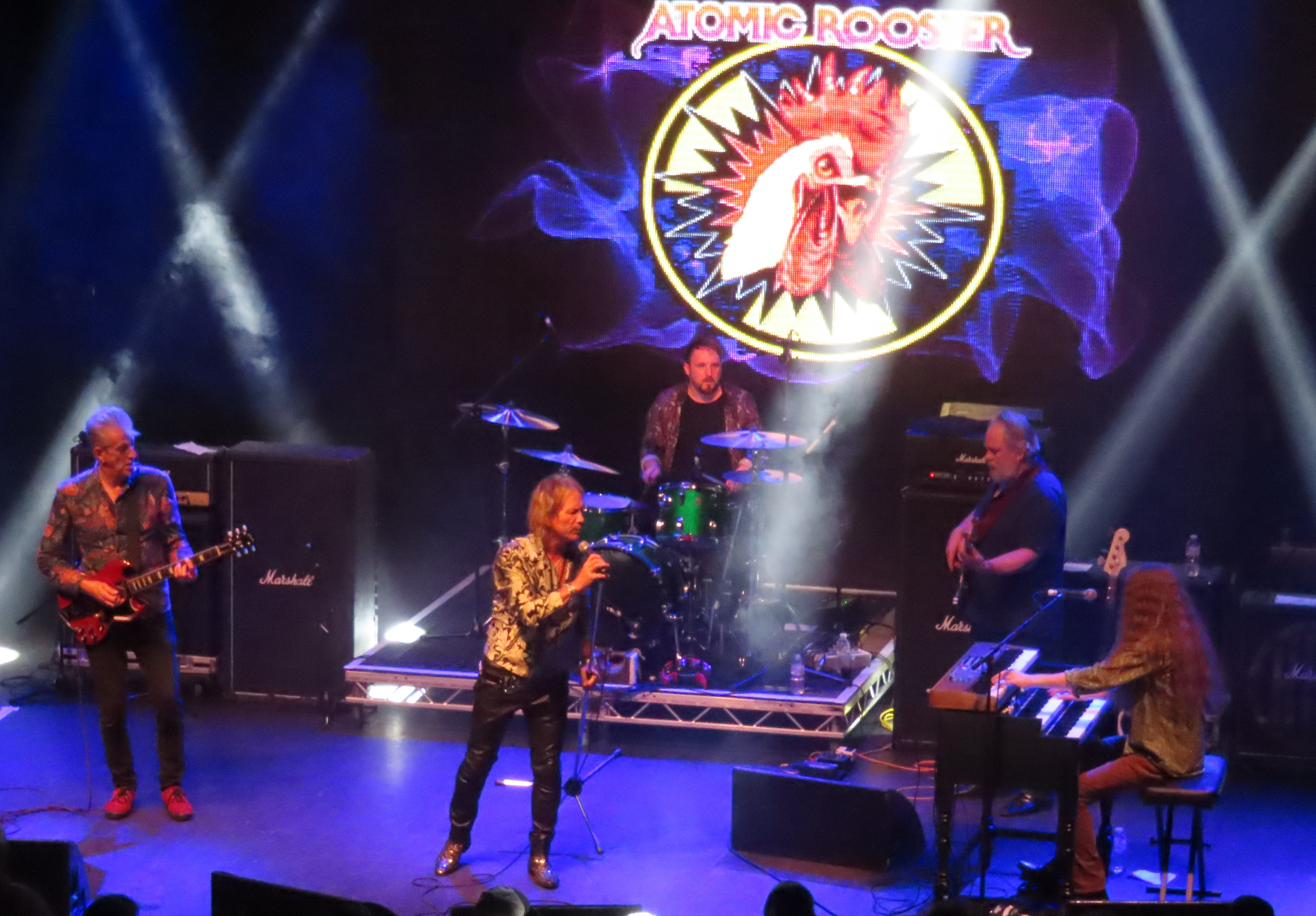
Atomic Rooster live at Shepherd's Bush Empire, 5th September 2021, Pete French stands at the microphone centre stage

In June 1971, French was asked to join Atomic Rooster while the band were in the middle of recording their album In Hearing of Atomic Rooster as Vincent Crane felt the band needed a singer who could "project" to an audience. Crane and guitarist John Du Cann had specifically chosen French as he admired Leaf Hound's album and like French's vocals.

He sang on five songs on the album, which entered the UK albums chart in the top 20. French felt "a little lost" though after the release as Crane had sacked Du Cann, and drummer Paul Hammond followed with him, so for a short time after joining he was the only other member of the band before Ric Parnell and Steve Bolton were hired. Pete was their primary lead singer for live performances, and toured Italy, Canada and the United States.

=== Cactus ===
While on a North American tour with Atomic Rooster in late 1971, Pete was approached by Tim Bogert of Cactus (a band they were touring with) and asked him to join their band in the States; he subsequently agreed after hearing them play: "I was completely knocked out by Tim Bogert and Carmine Appice's playing – to me they were to me like America's answer to Led Zeppelin's John Bonham and John Paul Jones, it was raw Rhythm and Blues with power." French left Atomic Rooster after the tour, and was replaced by Chris Farlowe in early 1972. Crane disapproved of this decision and tried to convince French to stay.

The only album French sang on with Cactus was 'Ot 'n' Sweaty, an album he chose the name for and wrote co-wrote five tracks for. After the album was released, French discovered that Bogert and drummer Carmine Appice were planning on leaving Cactus and forming Beck, Bogert & Appice, and Pete was given the opportunity to carry on a new Cactus, which he did briefly before leaving and returning to Britain, as that "was not what I signed a five year contract to do, so I was pretty pissed off and felt very badly treated by Carmine and Tim and the management for trying to double deal. I felt that it would be a complete rip off to tour with the name Cactus without the main rhythm section, so I left".

=== Randy Pie and solo album ===
Not long after French returned to Britain, he moved again, to Hamburg in Germany, where he lived for three years, and recorded an album with the band Randy Pie: "I hated the name but heard that they were terrific musicians so I gave it a shot and yes I got the audition over some three hundred other would be vocalists". When the album was recorded, members of Randy Pie branched off to other smaller bands instead of capitalising off of the albums success, so instead the label gave French a deal to record a solo album back in London.

In 1978, he recorded the solo album Ducks In Flight. The album included works from French, cousin Mick Hills who he had got back in touch with again, as well as Kenney Jones, Brian Robertson and Micky Moody. The album was well received however Polydor did not sign up French as an artist.

=== Later career ===
By the 1980s, French was back in London and was "disillusioned with the music scene" as new wave and pop had become the new mainstream music. He recorded the track "Nightmare" with Gillan as his backing band, which went unreleased as labels did not approve of the sound; Gillan frontman Ian Gillan heard the track and soon released it himself. French returned to the United States after Carmine Appice from Cactus contacted him to write a few songs for his upcoming album, Carmine Appice (album) in 1981. After this, French retired from music.

On 1 May 1999, French came out of retirement and sang at a tribute concert for Cozy Powell, who had died on 5 April. Other artists who performed at the concert included Brian May, Spike Edney, Neil Murray, Tony Martin, Mike Casswell, Johnny Marter, Darren Wharton, John Idan, Chris Thompson, Martin Chambers, Bobby Rondinelli, Clayton Moss, Denny Ball, Frank Aiello, Andy Scott, Susie Webb, Zoe Nicholas, Tony Ashton, Chris Farlowe, Russel Gilbrook, Norman Beaker Band and The Bailey Bros.

French and Bogart got in touch in the early 2000s and played a one off gig at the Underworld club; soon after this gig, French learned that musicians at this club and local artists were playing songs from Leaf Hound's album and were big fans of the group. Pete soon discovered the influence the band had on blues and rock fans, including Wolfmother and Tame Impala, and eventually in 2004, formed a new Leaf Hound band. The new Leaf Hound released a new album in 2007. In June 2006, French played a few dates with a newly reformed Cactus, featuring Bogert, Appice and Jim McCarty, including a performance at a rock festival in Sweden. Also in 2006, he performed alongside Ronnie Wood and Micky Green at the wake of Wood's brother Art.

In 2016, over thirty years after Atomic Rooster had ended, the band reformed witth blessings from member Crane's widow, Jean; French was invited back into the band, 45 years after originally leaving, along with guitarist Steve Bolton, who joined just before French left in 1971. In late 2023, French departed the group. In a 2025 interview, French said that he enjoyed touring Europe with the new Atomic Rooster, but felt that it "was never to be quite the same without Vince (Crane) and John (Du Cann)'s influence, the creativity seemed to have gone". He now devotes his career to Leaf Hound.

== Personal life ==
French was born in London. He has a son, Dominic, who is also a musician and who now plays drums with his father in Leaf Hound.

== Discography ==
=== Albums ===
| Year | Title | Notes |
|---|---|---|
| 1968 | Bullen St. Blues | Brunning Sunflowers Blues Band album |
| 1970 | Leaf Hound | Leaf Hound album |
| 1971 | Growers of Mushroom | Leaf Hound album / Growers of Mushroom is the Leaf Hound album from 1970 but with slight changes |
| 1971 | In Hearing of Atomic Rooster | Atomic Rooster album |
| 1972 | 'Ot 'n' Sweaty | Cactus album |
| 1973 | Beck, Bogert & Appice | Beck, Bogert & Appice album / credited as composer |
| 1973 | Live in Japan | Beck, Bogert & Appice live album / co-wrote two tracks |
| 1977 | Fast/Forward | Randy Pie album |
| 1978 | Ducks in Flight | Solo album |
| 1981 | Carmine Appice | Carmine Appice album |
| 2007 | Unleashed | Leaf Hound album |
| 2007 | On Top | The Amulators album |
| 2014 | Live in Japan | Leaf Hound live album |
| 2025 | Once Bitten | Leaf Hound album |

=== Singles ===
| Year | A-side | B-side | Notes |
|---|---|---|---|
| 1977 | "Stand Up!" | "Work It Out" | Randy Pie single |
| 1977 | "Give Me Your Love" | "Same Old Questions" | Solo single |
