= Atlanta International Pop Festival =

1969 rock festival in Georgia, US

The first Atlanta International Pop Festival was a rock festival held at the Atlanta International Raceway in Hampton, Georgia, twenty miles south of Atlanta, on the July Fourth (Friday) weekend, 1969, more than a month before Woodstock. Crowd estimates ranged from the high tens of thousands to as high as 150,000, with few problems reported other than those related to the hot weather.

The second Atlanta International Pop Festival was held in a soybean field adjacent to the Middle Georgia Raceway in Byron, Georgia, south of Macon, from July 3–5, 1970, although it did not finish until after dawn on the 6th. As in 1969, high temperatures were an issue, and nudity and drug use were widespread. The festival became a free event after promoters opened the gates when crowds outside threatened to overwhelm security, and estimates of the crowd ranged between 150,000 and 600,000. The festival saw rock icon Jimi Hendrix perform before his largest American audience ever and featured the up-and-coming Macon-based Allman Brothers Band.

The 1970 festival would end up being the final Atlanta International Pop Festival, with Georgia authorities passing legislation to make it more difficult for anyone to organize another such rock festival in the state. It remains one of the largest public gatherings in Georgia history and one of the largest music festivals of its era. Recordings of some of the performances have been released by some of the performers involved (e.g. Hendrix and the Allmans) and seven songs were included on the 1971 album The First Great Rock Festivals of the Seventies: Isle Of Wight / Atlanta Pop Festival.

== 1969 festival ==
Atlanta International Pop Festival
- Poster for the event
- Genre: Rock, pop, jazz, blues
- Dates: July 4–5, 1969
- Locations: Atlanta International Raceway, Hampton, Georgia, United States
- Founders: Chris Cowing, Robin Conant, Alex Cooley and 14 others.
- Attendance: 80,000-150,000 (est.)

The festival was organized by a seventeen-member promotional team that included Chris Cowing, Robin Conant and Alex Cooley. Cooley was also one of the organizers of the Texas International Pop Festival a few weeks later on Labor Day weekend, as well as the second, and last, Atlanta International Pop Festival the following summer, and the Mar Y Sol Pop Festival in Puerto Rico from April 1 to 3, 1972. The sound system for the 1969 Atlanta festival was supplied by Hanley Sound of Medford, Massachusetts, and the light show was provided by The Electric Collage of Atlanta, both of which would return for the second Atlanta Pop Festival. Although his name appeared on the promotional poster, Chuck Berry did not perform at the festival.

With temperatures nearing a hundred degrees (38 °C), local fire departments used fire hoses to create "sprinklers" for the crowd to play in and cool off. It was a peaceful, energetic, hot and loud festival with few (if any) problems other than heat related. Concession stands, however, were woefully inadequate, with attendees frequently standing in line for an hour to get a soft drink.

On the Monday following the festival, July 7, the festival promoters gave Atlanta's music fans a gift: a free concert in Atlanta's Piedmont Park featuring Chicago Transit Authority, Delaney & Bonnie & Friends, and Spirit, all of whom had played at the festival, and Grateful Dead, who had not. According to the Atlanta Journal and Constitution, the free event was the promoters' way of showing "their appreciation for the overwhelming success of the festival", although Alex Cooley has also described their motivation as simple hippie guilt at making a few-thousand-dollar profit. Piedmont Park had by then become the location of regular, free, and often impromptu rock concerts by mostly local Atlanta bands, and, beginning in mid-May 1969, by Macon's new Allman Brothers Band.

=== Lineup ===
Over twenty musical acts performed at the event:

- Blood, Sweat & Tears
- Booker T. & the M.G.'s
- The Butterfield Blues Band
- Canned Heat
- Chicago Transit Authority
- Joe Cocker
- Creedence Clearwater Revival
- The Dave Brubeck Trio w/ Gerry Mulligan
- Delaney and Bonnie and Friends
- Grand Funk Railroad
- Ian & Sylvia
- Tommy James and the Shondells
- Janis Joplin
- Al Kooper
- Led Zeppelin
- Pacific Gas & Electric
- Johnny Rivers
- Spirit
- The Staple Singers
- Sweetwater
- Ten Wheel Drive
- Johnny Winter

== 1970 festival ==
Atlanta International Pop Festival
- Promotional poster for the event. Design by Lance Bragg.
- Genre: Rock, pop, etc.
- Dates: July 3–5, 1970
- Location: United States
- Years active: 1970
- Founders: Alex Cooley

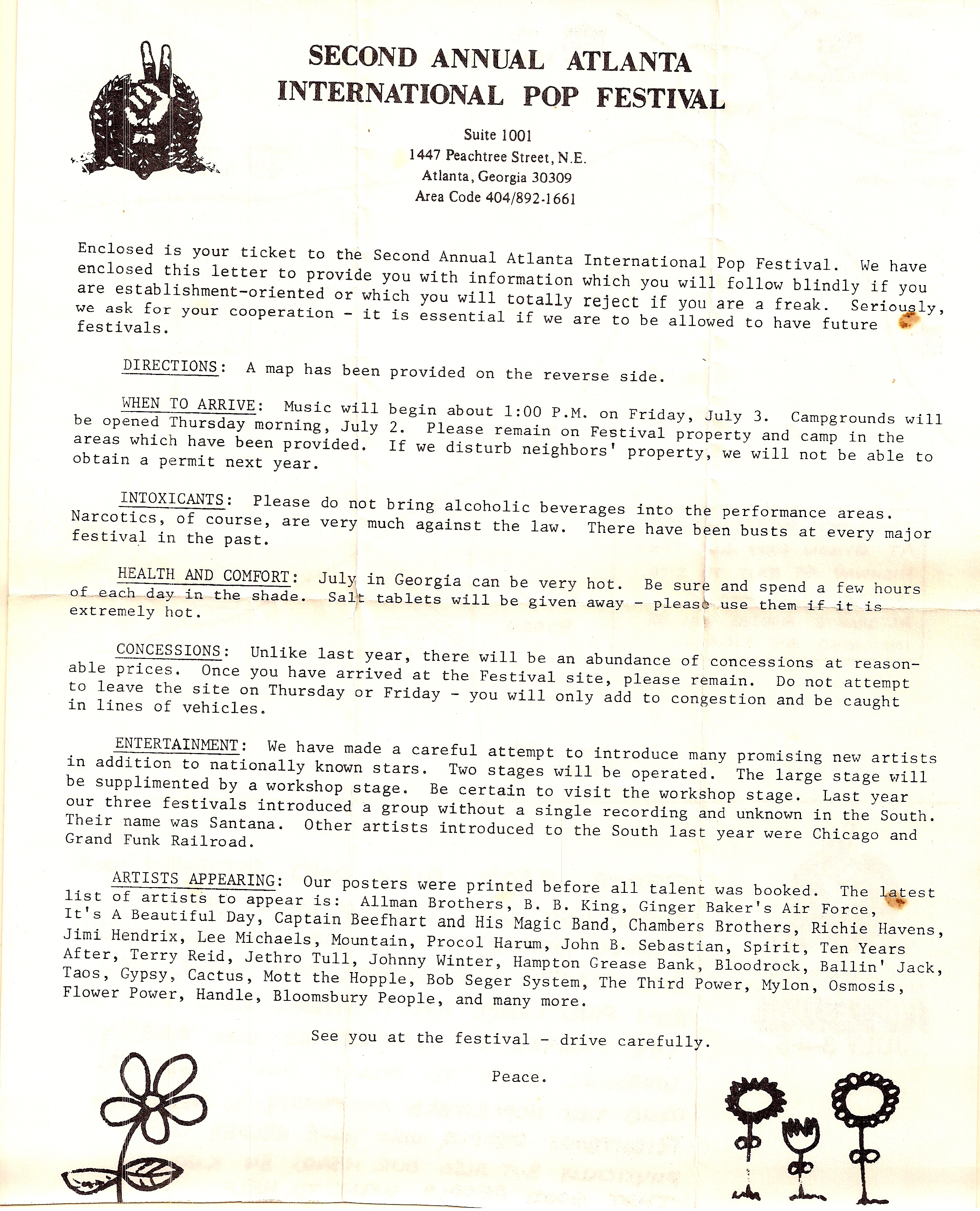
Letter to advance ticket-buyers

Like 1969's Woodstock festival, the event was promoted as "three days of peace, love and music." Tickets for the festival were priced at $14. Also like Woodstock, it became a free event when the promoters threw open the gates after large crowds outside began chanting "Free, free, free. Music belongs to the people" and threatened to overwhelm even the biker security crew the promoters had hired. Crowd estimates for the festival varied widely at the time, ranging from 150,000 to 600,000.

Construction crews worked at the festival site for over a month prior to the event's opening day building the main stage, two spotlight towers atop soaring tree-trunk tripods, an eight-foot tall plywood fence surrounding the entire 11.7-acre audience seating area, and other facilities. A separate, much smaller stage – the "Free Stage" - was also built some distance away in a wooded camping area to accommodate impromptu performances by mostly local Georgia musicians who wanted to play during the festival, and many did - including The Allman Brothers Band. During the construction phase, the band Wet Willie performed for the construction crew but did not perform during the festival itself. The festival sound system was supplied by Hanley Sound of Medford, Massachusetts, and a rear-projection light show was provided by The Electric Collage of Atlanta, both of which had provided similar services at the first Atlanta Pop Festival the previous summer.

Temperatures at the festival were sweltering, surpassing 100 degrees Fahrenheit (38 °C) every day. Although nudity and drug use were widespread, local law enforcement officials, who knew they were vastly outnumbered, stayed outside the festival gates and employed a general hands-off policy towards most festival-goers during the event's duration. However, Georgia's colorful governor, Lester Maddox, who had tried repeatedly to prevent the festival from taking place, vowed that he would do whatever it took to block any similar event in the future. The state legislature willingly complied and enacted sufficient restrictions to make it much more difficult for anyone to organize another rock festival in the state. A third Atlanta Pop Festival never took place.

=== Performers ===
Over thirty acts performed on the main stage during the course of the event:

- The Allman Brothers Band
- Ballin' Jack
- Bloodrock
- Bloomsbury People
- Cactus
- Cat Mother & the All Night Newsboys
- Chakra
- The Chambers Brothers
- Goose Creek Symphony
- Grand Funk Railroad
- Gypsy
- Memphis State University cast of "Hair"
- Hampton Grease Band
- Handle
- Richie Havens
- Hedge & Donna
- The Jimi Hendrix Experience
- It's a Beautiful Day
- Johnny Jenkins
- B.B. King
- Lee Michaels
- Mott the Hoople
- Mountain
- Poco
- Procol Harum
- Radar
- Rare Earth
- Terry Reid
- Rig
- Savage Grace
- John Sebastian
- Bob Seger System
- Spirit
- Ten Years After
- U.S. Kyds
- Johnny Winter

Jimi Hendrix performed at around midnight on the Fourth of July to the largest American audience of his career, presenting his unique rendition of the "Star-Spangled Banner" to accompany the celebratory fireworks display. The Anunga Runga Tribe of the musical HAIR, which had performed for two weeks in April 1970 on the campus of Memphis State University, were the last act to perform, following Richie Havens, who opened his set at dawn on Monday morning (July 6) with his version of "Here Comes the Sun."

Among the artists billed in various promotional materials and programs but who did not perform at the festival were: Captain Beefheart, Ginger Baker's Air Force, Taos, Jethro Tull, Ravi Shankar, Country Joe and the Fish, Judy Collins, Rotary Connection, and Sly and the Family Stone.

== Audio recordings ==
Not long after the 1970 festival, little-known country singer Paul Wilson recorded a song called "Hippie Invasion" about what he considered to be the seamier side of the festival crowds, which was released on a 45 rpm record by Country Town Records. In 1971, Savage Grace, one of the bands who performed at the festival, released their second album, Savage Grace 2, which contained "Macon, Georgia", a song they had written about some of their festival experiences. Also in 1971, Columbia Records released a triple-LP record album called The First Great Rock Festivals of the Seventies, featuring tracks by numerous artists recorded live at both the Second Atlanta International Pop Festival and the Isle of Wight Festival. The album went on to reach number 47 on the Billboard 200 album chart that same year. Jimi Hendrix's Atlanta Pop Festival performance was recorded and eleven songs from his set were later released as one of the four CDs in a 1991 box set called Stages, a release featuring one live performance from each of the four years of Hendrix's short but high-profile career. In 2003, The Allman Brothers Band released a recording of their festival opening and closing performances, Live at the Atlanta International Pop Festival: July 3 & 5, 1970. In February 2014, Columbia/Legacy released a 4-CD box set, True to the Blues: The Johnny Winter Story, which features three tracks recorded live at the festival, two of which were previously unreleased. In 2015, a more complete recording of sixteen of the songs in Jimi Hendrix's set, with improved audio quality, was released as a double CD and a separate double vinyl LP package called Freedom: Atlanta Pop Festival. The liner notes for this double album estimate attendance numbers for Hendrix's festival performance at around 200,000.

== Festival poster ==
The promotional poster for the festival was one of three such posters created by artist Lance Bragg, all featuring a similar design motif, to advertise the three successive pop festivals in which promoter Alex Cooley had been involved: the first Atlanta Pop Festival and the Texas International Pop Festival, both in 1969, and the Second Atlanta Pop Festival in 1970. The posters for both Atlanta festivals are featured in the book The Art of Rock, which states, "The success of large-scale festivals, like the two Atlanta International Pop Festivals… helped create a new image for Southern rock."

== Historical marker ==
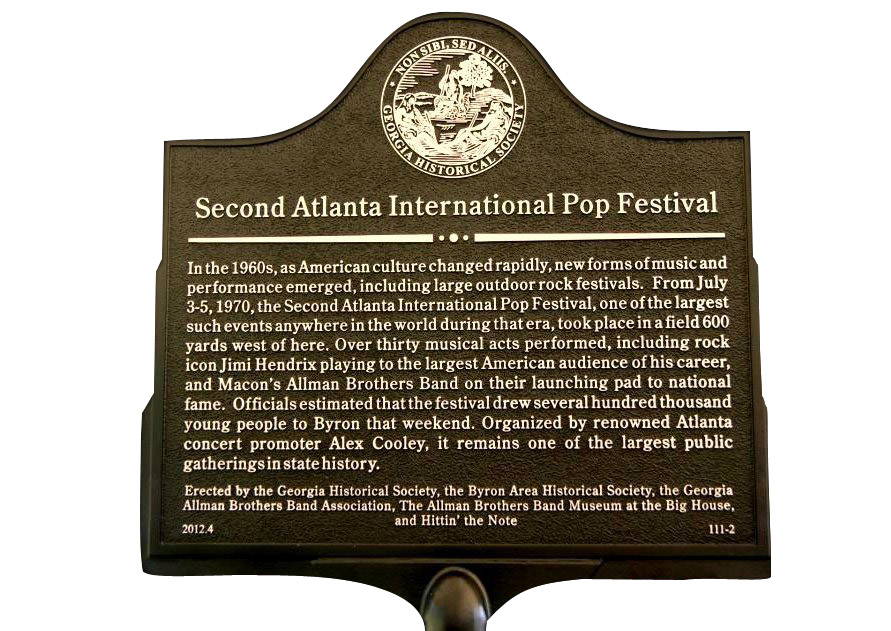
Georgia Historical Society marker.

On September 15, 2012, a ceremony was held near the site of the second festival to unveil and dedicate an official historical marker commemorating the event. The marker text reads: "In the 1960s, as American culture changed rapidly, new forms of music and performance emerged, including large outdoor rock festivals. From July 3–5, 1970, the Second Atlanta International Pop Festival, one of the largest such events anywhere in the world during that era, took place in a field 600 yards west of here. Over thirty musical acts performed, including rock icon Jimi Hendrix playing to the largest American audience of his career, and Macon's Allman Brothers Band on their launching pad to national fame. Officials estimated that the festival drew several hundred thousand young people to Byron that weekend. Organized by renowned Atlanta concert promoter Alex Cooley, it remains one of the largest public gatherings in state history." Official sponsors of the marker were the Georgia Historical Society, the Byron Area Historical Society, the Georgia Allman Brothers Band Association, The Allman Brothers Band Museum at the Big House and Hittin' the Note. The marker dedication ceremony was hosted by festival site landowner Tim Thornton, and featured Cooley, Byron Mayor Larry Collins, officials of the sponsoring organizations, and a crowd of festival attendees and fans.

== Documentary film ==
Also on September 15, 2012, the first audience test screening of a full-length documentary film on the festival was held in Macon, GA, by the film's director, Steve Rash. A second test screening was held two nights later in Atlanta. On July 30, 2014, two more test screenings were held at the Rock and Roll Hall of Fame in Cleveland, Ohio. The film features performances by most of the major musical acts appearing during the festival, as well as significant coverage of festival attendees, local residents, and the many other activities that swirled around the festival. Rash is re-editing the film based on feedback received during the screenings and plans an eventual public release.

On September 4, 2015, a feature-length documentary on Jimi Hendrix's Atlanta Pop Festival performance, "Jimi Hendrix: Electric Church", was aired on the US cable TV channel Showtime. The film not only featured substantial live footage of the performance, but interviews with Hendrix's bandmates, other musicians, those who organized the festival and shot the film, and residents of Byron, Georgia. The film was released on Blu-ray and DVD on November 6, 2015.

== See also ==
- List of music festivals
- List of historic rock festivals
- Live at the Atlanta International Pop Festival: July 3 & 5, 1970, a live album by The Allman Brothers Band released in 2003
- Freedom: Atlanta Pop Festival, a live album by The Jimi Hendrix Experience released in 2015
