= Restrictions (album) =

Studio album by Cactus
- Released: October 18, 1971
- Studio: Electric Lady (New York City)
- Genre: Hard rock; blues rock
- Length: 35:45
- Label: Atco
- Producer: Geoffrey Haslam

Cactus chronology
One Way... or Another (1971)	Restrictions (1971)	'Ot 'n' Sweaty (1972)

Professional ratings
Review scores
Source	Rating
AllMusic	2/5 stars

Restrictions is the third studio album by American rock band Cactus, released in 1971 by Atco Records. The tracks "Token Chokin'", "Evil", "Alaska" and "Sweet 16" were released as singles.

The album features heavy blues-rock originals, plus a cover of the Howlin' Wolf blues standard "Evil". Stoner rock band Monster Magnet used Cactus' arrangement of the song for their own cover, which appeared on their 1993 album Superjudge.

== Track listing ==
1. "Restrictions" (R. Day, C. Appice) – 6:16
2. "Token Chokin'" (R. Day, C. Appice) – 3:08
3. "Guiltless Glider" (R. Day, T. Bogert, C. Appice, J. McCarty) – 8:44
4. "Evil" (Willie Dixon) – 3:15
5. "Alaska" (J. McCarty, T. Bogert, R. Day) – 3:40
6. "Sweet Sixteen" (T. Bogert, R. Day, C. Appice, J. McCarty) – 3:19
7. "Bag Drag" (J. McCarty, R. Day) – 5:12
8. "Mean Night in Cleveland" (R. Day, T. Bogert, C. Appice, J. McCarty) – 2:10

== Personnel ==
Cactus

- Tim Bogert – bass guitar, backing vocals
- Carmine Appice – drums, backing vocals, percussion
- Jim McCarty – lead, rhythm and slide guitars
- Rusty Day – lead and backing vocals, harmonica, percussion

Additional personnel

- Ron Leejack – slide guitar
- Albhy Galuten – piano

== Charts ==
Chart (1971)	Peak position
US Billboard 200	155
