= Mar y Sol Pop Festival =

1972 music festival in Manatí, Puerto Rico

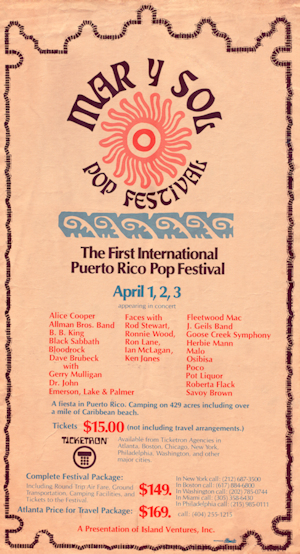
- "The hardest thing I’ve ever tried to do. It was just very difficult." – Alex Cooley
- Genre: hard rock, blues rock, folk rock, jazz, jazz fusion, progressive rock, and salsa.
- Dates: scheduled: April 1–3, 1972, but ran over to April 4
- Locations: Manatí, Puerto Rico (at the time, that area was mistakenly thought to be part of Vega Baja)
- Founders: Alex Cooley
- Attendance: 35,000
- Website: marysol-festival.com

The Mar y Sol Pop Festival (also referred to as Mar y Sol Festival or simply Mar y Sol – Sea and Sun) was a rock festival that took place in Manatí, Puerto Rico, about thirty miles west of San Juan, on April 1–4, 1972. It was held on 420 acres (1.7 km^{2}) of countryside adjacent to Los Tubos beach in Manatí on the north shore of the island. An estimated 30–35,000 people attended the festival.

Almost every review by newspapers and magazines condemned the festival as being unsuccessful and uncomfortable. These included Creem, The New York Times as well as local newspapers El Nuevo Día, El Imparcial, El Mundo and The San Juan Star. One exception was New York Times reporter Les Ledbetter who printed a column on April 9 titled "It was a success – ask the people".

Several accidental deaths at the beach and a murder were also damaging to the festival's reputation.

An arrest warrant was issued for promoter Alex Cooley, who avoided arrest by leaving the island before the festival was over.

== Preparation ==
=== First attempt ===
The festival was intended to be called the Vega Baja Music & Art Fair. It was planned to take place at Tortuguero Beach in Vega Baja during Thanksgiving college break in 1971. Acts that were signed to perform included the Chambers Brothers, the Allman Brothers, Ike & Tina Turner, the Beach Boys, Stevie Wonder, Procol Harum, Ali Akbar Khan, Ten Years After, Poco, Richie Havens, and John Mayall. The date for the festival was repeatedly postponed due to financial problems.

=== Alex Cooley ===
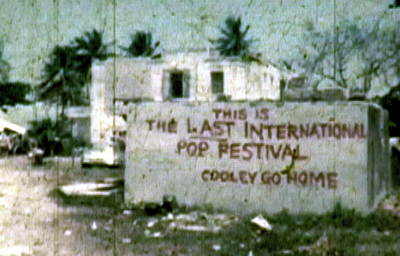
"COOLEY GO HOME" A mural was painted near the festival's office by festival protesters.

Eventually some of the promoters were able to persuade Alex Cooley (Atlanta International Pop Festival, Texas International Pop Festival and 2nd Atlanta International Pop Festival) to take over production of the festival. The dates were then finalized for April 1–3, 1972, coinciding with Holy Week. This sparked a high volume of criticism by both the government and the press of Puerto Rico. "Then the newspapers [from Puerto Rico] got a hold of it and they started just slamming it." said Cooley in a 2006 interview.

=== Venue ===
The designated area for Fiesta Del Sol/Mar y Sol was mainly in the countryside and extended to the Los Tubos beach. This area is located between the beach and the Tortuguero Lagoon and is divided by a public road (which was closed during the festival). On the side facing the beach they had the main showering area, camping areas, the infirmary and the festival's office. On the side facing the lagoon they had the stage and merchants area. The coordinates are: 18°28'20"N 66°26'46"W.

== The festival ==
=== Performers ===
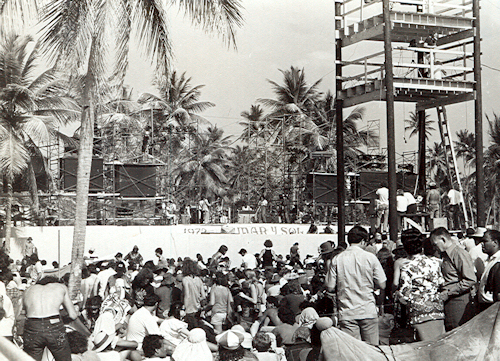
The opener of the festival was local jazz group "Rubber Band"

These are the performers for which there is evidence (audio, photos or multiple witnesses) that they did play at the festival:

- Allman Brothers Band (live material officially & unofficially released)
- Long John Baldry (live material officially released)
- Banda del K-rajo (local rock band)
- Bang
- Brownsville Station (live material unofficially released)
- Dave Brubeck with Gerry Mulligan (live material unofficially released)
- Cactus (live performance on April 3, 1972 – live material officially released)
- Alice Cooper (live material officially released)
- Jonathan Edwards (live material officially & unofficially released)
- Elephant's Memory
- Emerson, Lake & Palmer (live performance on April 2, 1972 – live material officially released)
- Faces w/ Rod Stewart (live material officially & unofficially released)
- Fran Ferrer y Puerto Rico 2010 (local salsa band) (live material unofficially released)
- J. Geils Band (live material officially & unofficially released)
- Billy Joel (live material unofficially released)
- Dr. John the Night Tripper (live material officially released)
- B. B. King (live material officially & unofficially released)
- Mahavishnu Orchestra w/ John McLaughlin (live material officially released)
- Herbie Mann (live material officially & unofficially released)
- Nitzinger (live material officially & unofficially released)
- Osibisa (last band to play) (live material officially released)
- Michael Overly (played between various acts) (live material officially released)
- David Peel and the Lower East Side (live material unofficially released)
- Potliquor (live material unofficially released)
- Rubber Band (first band to play – local jazz band)
- Stonehenge
- Roberta Flack
- Malo

=== John Lennon's recorded message ===
Segment of the message by John and Yoko. Introduced and played onstage by David Peel. Recorded from the audience by Pedro Collazo.

John Lennon wanted to attend the festival along with his wife Yoko Ono but ended up not flying down to the island due to problems he was having with the government at the time regarding their attempts to deport him. Instead he sent a recorded message with his friend David Peel who was set to perform at the festival. During his performance (April 2) and after a short introduction, David Peel played the tape to the audience which was mainly greetings from John and Yoko.

=== Billy Joel's first major performance ===
Billy Joel performing at Mar y Sol on Sunday, April 2.

One performance that stood out was Billy Joel's. At the time few knew who he was. He had only released his first album Cold Spring Harbor with a small record company called Family Productions and the album was not doing very well. But his performance at Mar y Sol electrified the crowd and gave a major boost to his career.

"His performance was brought to the attention of Clive Davis, the head of Columbia Records, who was impressed with Joel's artistry."

— Ken Bielen, The Words and Music of Billy Joel, p. 23

He was eventually signed by Columbia Records in 1973.

=== Cancelled performers ===
Some artists cancelled due to the legal problems the festival promoters were having with the government of Puerto Rico. Some were cancelled by the producer due to schedule conflicts.

- Black Sabbath – They were ready and waiting at the Cerromar hotel in Dorado the last day of the festival. However, at the moment there were no more helicopters available and it was decided that they would never make it by street due to the bad traffic caused by the festival.
- Bloodrock – They were at the festival but got cancelled by the producer.
- Flash Cadillac
- Fleetwood Mac

=== Other listed artists ===
It is unclear if the following artists performed or not. They were part of the performer's list and some were even mentioned at the beginning of the festival but there is no further information on whether they were cancelled or if they played.

- Ashton, Gardner and Dyke
- Savoy Brown
- Goose Creek Symphony
- Al Kooper
- Kenny Loggins and Jim Messina
- Poco
- Billy Preston
- Mitch Ryder and the Detroit Wheels

=== Sound / Woodstock ===
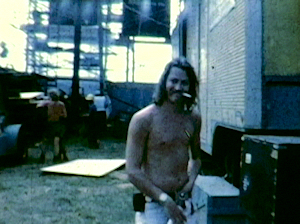
Eric Blackstead standing next to the Hanley Sound truck at Mar y Sol.

Sound for the festival was engineered by sound engineer Bill Hanley, who was also in charge of the sound at Woodstock. The speakers were also the same ones used at Woodstock.

Alex Cooley also had Eric Blackstead, producer of Woodstock: Music from the Original Soundtrack and More, as his audio consultant.

== Music albums ==
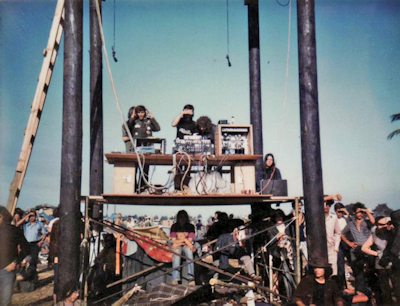
Soundboard at Mar y Sol

=== Various artists: Mar y Sol ===
The album Mar y Sol: The First International Puerto Rico Pop Festival was released in 1972 by Atco Records. It features well-known artists such as Emerson, Lake & Palmer, Dr. John, Long John Baldry and The Allman Brothers Band, as well as up-and-coming artists such as Mahavishnu Orchestra with John McLaughlin, John Nitzinger, Osibisa, Jonathan Edwards and Cactus. The album was never released on CD.

Some major performers who were not on the album include Alice Cooper, Dave Brubeck, and Faces.

=== Cactus: 'Ot 'n' Sweaty ===
That same year Cactus released the LP 'Ot 'n' Sweaty which included 3 songs from the festival on side one ("Let Me Swim", "Big Bad Mother Boogie" and "Our Li'l Rock & Roll Thing") and 5 new studio songs on side two. Although most songs were new studio recordings, the album art as well as the title were inspired by the festival. All photos used on the album were also taken at the festival during their performance.

=== ELP: Live at the Mar y Sol Festival '72 ===
In 2011 (thirty nine years later) Emerson, Lake & Palmer released Live at the Mar y Sol Festival '72 which included their entire performance at the festival. The original 16-track tapes were found by the band in 2006 and released for the first time in 2007 in the boxed set From the Beginning (on Disc 5).

=== Alice Cooper: Old School: 1964–1974 ===
Also in 2011 Alice Cooper released an instrumental version "School's Out" from their Mar y Sol performance in his boxed set "Old School: 1964–1974" (Disc 2, track 2). The entire soundboard recording of their performance at the festival was released in 2023 as an extra CD on their Killer (Deluxe Edition) release.

=== Bootlegs ===
There's other music of Mar y Sol that exists only as bootlegs. One of them is the entire set of Billy Joel which is a deteriorated version of the official soundboard recording. There's also a 3 CD series of audience recordings by attendees Pedro Collazo and Oscar Mandry (from Ponce, Puerto Rico) called "The Collazo/Mandry Tapes" which was edited and prepared by Mar y Sol Festival's historian, Reniet Ramirez, for free online distribution. This series of bootlegs include 38 songs by: Allman Brothers Band, B. B. King, Brownsville Station, Dave Brubeck (w/ Gerry Mulligan), David Peel and the Lower East Side, Faces, Fran Ferrer y Puerto Rico 2010, Herbie Mann, J. Geils Band, Jonathan Edwards, Nitzinger and Pot Liquor.

== Video ==
Mar y Sol was going to be filmed professionally but the film makers backed out due to the many legal problems the promoters were having on the island. It is believed that most, if not all, news footage has been lost. Only amateur footage exists and so far only three 8mm films have been found and published online. None of this footage contains full songs from any performer, instead they capture random footage from different areas of the festival.

== Legacy ==
=== Short story ===
In 1978 Puerto Rican poet Manuel Abreu Adorno published a 12 short story book titled "Llegaron Los Hippies" (The Hippies Came [arrived]). The main short story, also titled "Llegaron Los Hippies", was written about Mar y Sol. The book was very rare and has been out of print for decades. In 2011 it was translated and published again. The new version contains all 12 short stories in both English and Spanish.

=== Remember Mar y Sol, the concert ===
In 1982, in celebration of the 10th anniversary, a concert was held in San Juan, Puerto Rico called "Remember Mar y Sol". This concert had nothing to do with the original producer (Alex Cooley) and the only performer from the original festival was David Peel. Information about this concert is very scarce but most people remember it being a complete failure.

=== A revived subject ===
As opposed to Woodstock and other similar music festivals from those days, the subject of Mar y Sol was quickly forgotten. Most reviews (both local and in the U.S.) described the festival as a failure and a mistake. There was never a film, a documentary or book about it to prove otherwise or to at least serve as a source of information. Mar y Sol became a rare subject that through the years kept disappearing. The only souvenir available was the Mar y Sol LP which was eventually discontinued and never released on CD.

In 1993 however, Reniet Ramirez (from Puerto Rico), found out about Mar y Sol and became very interested with the subject and in 2004 decided to become the historian of Mar y Sol.

=== Mar y Sol site today ===
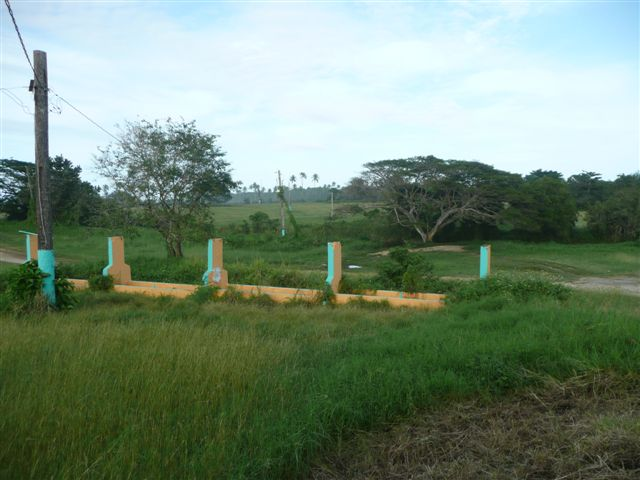
The structure for the showers at the festival is still almost intact in 2010.

- South side: The area of the festival on the side facing the lagoon (where the stage was located) was never used for anything else and was eventually made into a nature reserve.
- North side: The side facing the beach was eventually divided in two areas; one section was made into a balneario while the rest remains almost intact, including the showers structure (originally used to provide water to cows) and a water tank. This area is also used every year to hold the Festival Playero Los Tubos de Manatí.

=== 40th anniversary attendees reunion ===
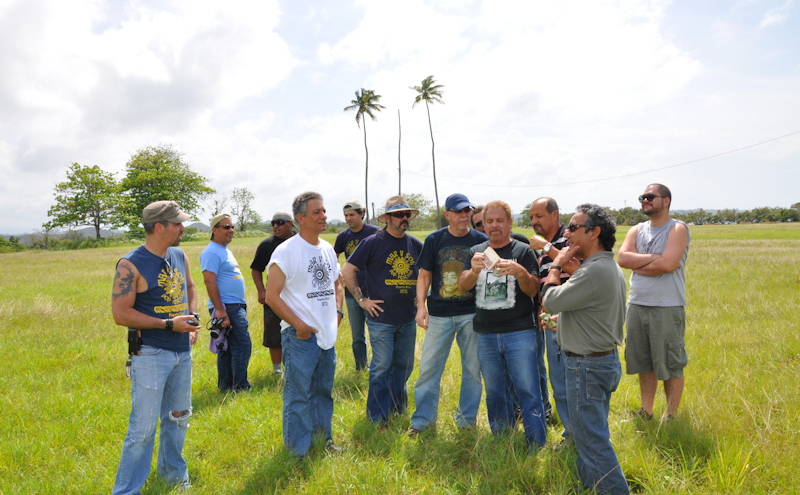
Mar y Sol attendees and other enthusiasts walk (in 2012) through what was one of the camping areas during the festival.

On Saturday March 31, 2012, while filming an amateur documentary about Mar y Sol, historian Reniet Ramirez, hosted an improvised gathering (including festival attendees as well as younger people who are enthusiasts of the subject)

== Gallery ==
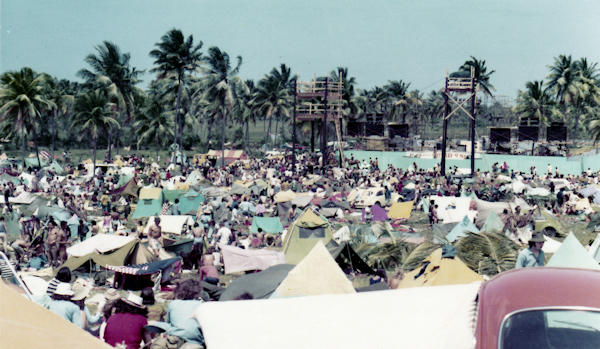
Wide shot of the stage area
(Photo: Cesar Rosa)

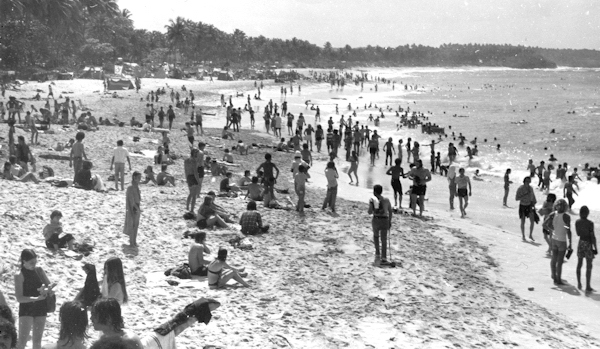
The beach was one of the main attractions at the festival
(Photo: Cesar Rosa)

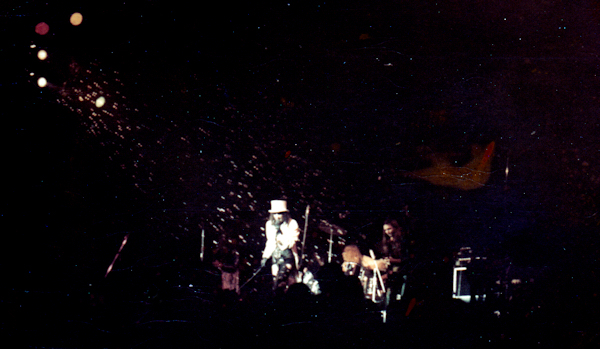
Alice Cooper performed around 5:00am on Sunday April 2
(Photo: Pedro Collazo)

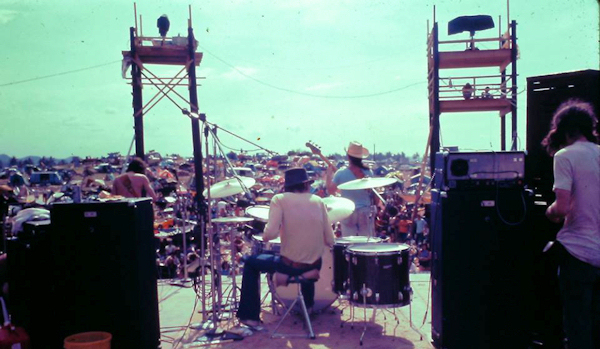
Stonehenge performed for the second time in the afternoon of Monday April 3
(Photo: Ron Cutuli)

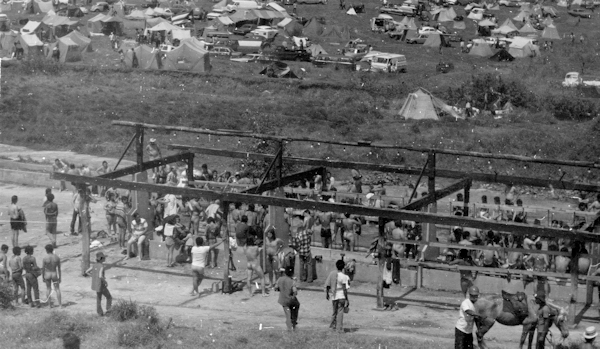
The showers area was located near the beach and next to a creek
(Photo: Cesar Rosa)

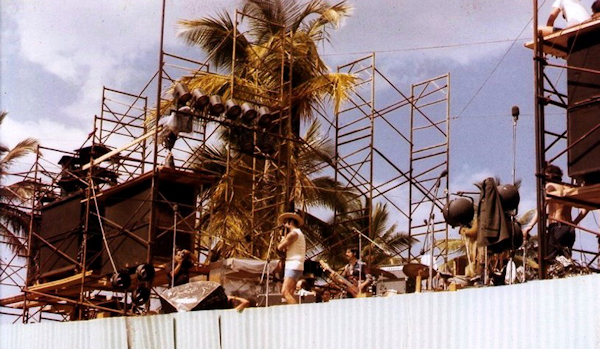
Herbie Mann performed in the morning of Sunday April 2
(Photo: Pedro Collazo)

== See also ==
- List of historic rock festivals
- List of jam band music festivals
