= Roland Robinson =

Roland Robinson may refer to:

- Roland Robinson, 1st Baron Martonmere (1907–1989), British politician; governor of Bermuda, 1964–1972
- Roland Robinson (poet) (1912–1992), Australian poet and writer
- Roland Robinson (musician) (1949–2004), American studio session bass player and songwriter
- Rollie Robinson (born 1985), Canadian curler
