= Cactus V =

Studio album by Cactus
- Released: July 18, 2006
- Studios: Electric Randyland; Sound Asylum
- Genres: Hard rock; blues rock
- Length: 62:52
- Label: Escapi Music
- Producers: Jim McCarty, Carmine Appice

Cactus chronology
| 'Ot 'n' Sweaty (1972) | Cactus V (2006) | Black Dawn (2016) |

Professional ratings
Review scores
| Source | Rating |
|---|---|
| Allmusic | 2.5/5 stars |

Cactus V is the fifth album by American rock supergroup Cactus released in 2006.

Cactus re-emerged in May 2006 in New York City for a radio broadcast on The Radiochick Show, and their first show since 1972 at B.B. King's Blues Club in Times Square on June 3. The 2006 version of Cactus saw original members Appice, Bogert and McCarty reunited and joined by former Savoy Brown frontman Jimmy Kunes on vocals, filling in for the late original Cactus singer Rusty Day. This show was a warm up for the gig which sparked the reunion, an appearance at the Sweden Rock Festival in Norje, Sweden on June 9. Randy Pratt of The Lizards joined the band in New York and Sweden on harmonica. The band went into the studio and recorded Cactus V. It was their first album together in 34 years.

== Track listing ==
All songs composed by Carmine Appice, Tim Bogert, Jimmy Kunes and Jim McCarty; except where indicated

1. "Doing Time" – 4:49
2. "Muscle and Soul" – 5:39
3. "Cactus Music" – 4:34
4. "The Groover" – 4:47
5. "High in the City" – 4:11
6. "Day for Night" – 5:49
7. "Living for Today" (Appice, McCarty, Kunes, Bogert, Peter French) – 2:58
8. "Shine" – 3:57
9. "Electric Blue" – 5:40
10. "Your Brother's Keeper" – 4:33
11. "Blues for Mr. Day" – 1:21
12. "Part of the Game" – 5:02
13. "Gone Train Gone" – 4:50
14. "Jazzed" – 4:42

== Personnel ==
Cactus

- Tim Bogert – bass guitar, backing vocals
- Carmine Appice – drums, backing vocals
- Jim McCarty – guitar
- Jimmy Kunes – lead vocals
- Randy Pratt – harmonica
