= One Way... or Another =

Studio album by Cactus
- Released: February 24, 1971
- Recorded: 1970–1971
- Studio: Electric Lady (New York City)
- Genres: Hard rock; blues rock
- Length: 41:32
- Label: Atco
- Producer: Cactus

Cactus chronology
Cactus (1970)	One Way... or Another (1971)	Restrictions (1971)

Professional ratings
Review scores
Source	Rating
AllMusic	4/5 stars

One Way... or Another is the second studio album by American rock band Cactus, released in 1971 by Atco Records. It includes several original songs as well as two cover versions: Little Richard's 1956 hit "Long Tall Sally" and Chuck Willis' "I Feel So Bad" as "Feel So Bad" (their first album contained the song "Feel So Good").

== Recording and music ==
The album was recorded at the newly opened Electric Lady Studios in New York with the renowned Eddie Kramer and his team at the engineers console. It follows the six-originals, two-covers pattern of their debut album Cactus. "Long Tall Sally", in a slower tempo than the original, opens the album with a rousing start. The album then runs through a string of original compositions, with the addition of Chuck Willis' 1954 song "Feel So Bad" in the middle. Also included is the short instrumental "Song for Aries", which showcases McCarty's underrated lead guitar. The album was released in February 1971, just seven months after their first album.

== Track listing ==
All titles by Appice, Bogert, Day, McCarty except where noted.

1. "Long Tall Sally" (Robert "Bumps" Blackwell, Enotris Johnson, Richard Penniman) – 5:54
2. "Rockout Whatever You Feel Like" – 4:00
3. "Rock N' Roll Children" – 5:44
4. "Big Mama Boogie – Parts I & II" – 5:29
5. "Feel So Bad" (Chuck Willis) – 5:31
6. "Song for Aries" (Appice, Day, McCarty) – 3:05
7. "Hometown Bust" – 6:39
8. "One Way... or Another" – 5:06

== Personnel ==
Cactus

- Tim Bogert – bass, backing vocals, lead vocals (2)
- Carmine Appice – drums, backing vocals, percussion
- Jim McCarty – guitar
- Rusty Day – lead vocals (all but 2), harmonica

Technical

- Cactus – producer, design
- Edwin H. Kramer – engineer
- Dave Palmer, John Jansen – assistant engineers
- Alan Azzolino – cover photo
- Jim Cummins – sleeve and poster photography

== Charts ==
Chart (1971)	Peak position
Canada Top Albums/CDs (RPM)	69
US Billboard 200	88
