= Linear drumming =

Drum set playing style

Linear drumming is a drum kit playing style in which no drum, cymbal, or other drum component hits simultaneously. Unlike other forms of time keeping and fills, there is no layering of parts. For example, if playing a cymbal, no other drum set voice, such as a snare or bass drum, would be hit at the same time. Various cymbal ostinatos and other stickings can be used, but are not required. Linear drumming does not refer to any specific function of playing; rather, it applies to grooves, rhythms, and embellishments designed to create musical phrases. The drum kit voices can be combined in any order. One common fill application uses the combination of double stroke rudiments and single stroke rudiments between the hands and feet in a succession of sixteenth notes or triplets.

Linear drum beats have appeared in various formats, ranging from shuffle feels, 4/4 feels, double-time feels, half-time feels, swing, and odd time meters. The playing style has steadily gained popularity amongst professional artists worldwide. It has been applied by drummers such as Jeff Porcaro (“Rosanna”), David Garibaldi (“What is Hip”, “Down to the Nightclub”, “Soul Vaccination”, and “Oakland Stroke”), and Steve Gadd (“50 Ways to Leave Your Lover”). Steve Gadd has been associated with a signature drum lick that uses linear playing methods to create a thirty-second note half-time feel. Electronic and hip hop artists have also applied the linear time keeping concept using drum machines (ex. Mac Miller’s “I’m Not Real”).
