= Luke Rayner =

British musician

Luke Rayner is a British, London-based guitarist and record producer. He is best known for being part of the reformed Leaf Hound. Since joining Leaf Hound his guitar style and ability have been praised by the music press; Classic Rock calling him, "a real discovery" and Metal Hammer, "a guitar hero in the making". He is the older brother of the fashion photographer Ben Rayner.

== Production work ==
Rayner was introduced to original vocalist Peter French in 2004, they began a songwriting partnership that would create the songs for Unleashed, a Leaf Hound album released in 2007. Rayner produced Unleashed and was credited with, "retaining an enviable 1970s authenticity and spirit". He also produced the debut album for the London-based metal band 9 Days Down.
