= Cactus (Cactus album) =

Studio album by Cactus
- Released: July 1, 1970
- Recorded: October–December 1969
- Studios: Ultra-Sonic Recording, Hempstead, New York
- Genres: Hard rock; blues rock; heavy metal
- Length: 40:16
- Label: Atco
- Producer: Cactus

Cactus chronology
Cactus (1970)	One Way... or Another (1971)

Professional ratings
Review scores
Source	Rating
AllMusic	4.5/5 stars

Cactus is the debut studio album by American rock band Cactus, released on July 1, 1970, by Atco Records. The eight tracks consist of six original songs written by the band, plus covers of Mose Allison's version of blues standard "Parchman Farm", and Willie Dixon's "You Can't Judge a Book by the Cover". The introduction to the track "Let Me Swim" loosely inspired the first few seconds of the 1978 instrumental "Eruption" by Van Halen.

== Track listing ==
All titles written and arranged by Appice, Bogert, Day and McCarty, except where noted.

1. "Parchman Farm" (Mose Allison) – 3:06
2. "My Lady from South of Detroit" – 4:26
3. "Bro. Bill" – 5:10
4. "You Can't Judge a Book by the Cover" (Willie Dixon) – 6:30
5. "Let Me Swim" – 3:50
6. "No Need to Worry" – 6:14
7. "Oleo" – 4:51
8. "Feel So Good" – 6:03

== Personnel ==
Cactus

- Rusty Day – lead vocals, harmonica
- Jim McCarty – guitar
- Carmine Appice – drums
- Tim Bogert – bass

Production

- Bill Stahl – recording engineer
- Gene Paul – remix engineer
- Mark L. Rollins, Jr. – art direction, photography

== Charts ==
Chart (1970)	Peak position
Canada Top Albums/CDs (RPM)	43
US Billboard 200	54
