= Caley Picture House =

Cinema in Edinburgh, Scotland

Coordinates: 55°56′53.63″N 3°12′22.24″W

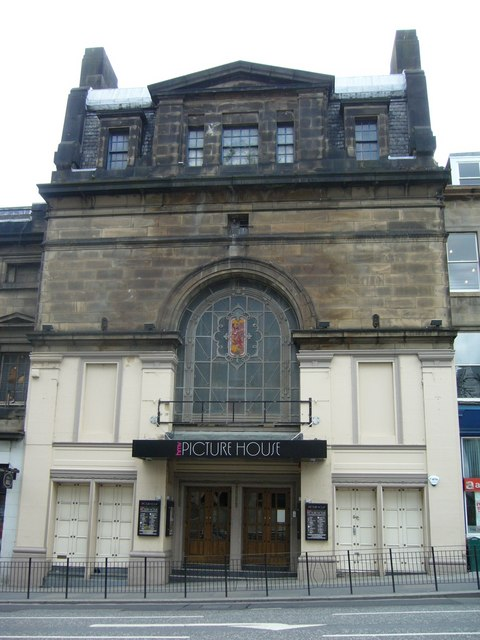
Former Picture House, Edinburgh

Caley Picture House was a cinema and concert venue located in Edinburgh, Scotland.

== History ==
The auditorium, which opened in 1923, originally seated 900, and was later increased to 1,900 in 1928. The cinema was closed in 1984 and was converted into a discothèque in 1986. Notable past performers include Robin Trower, Wishbone Ash, Uriah Heep, Hawkwind, Rory Gallagher, Queen, Beck, Bogert & Appice, Gentle Giant and AC/DC.

The building became a Wetherspoons pub in 2016.
