= Beck, Bogert & Appice =

Hard rock supergroup

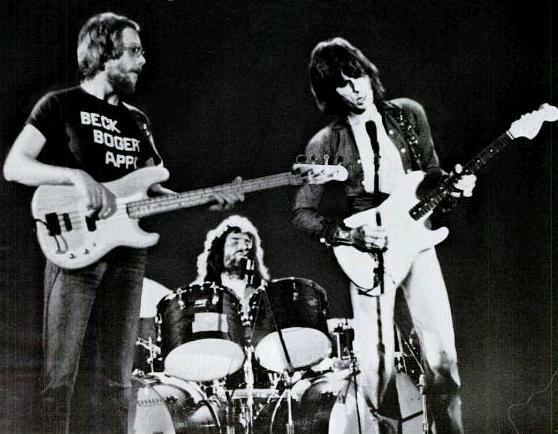
- BB&A in May 1973. Left to right: Tim Bogert, Carmine Appice and Jeff Beck.

Background information
- Also known as: The Jeff Beck Group (1972), BB&A
- Origin: Pittsburgh, Pennsylvania, U.S.
- Genres: Hard rock; blues rock
- Years active: 1972–1974
- Label: Epic
- Spinoff of: Vanilla Fudge; Cactus; The Jeff Beck Group; Boxer
- Past members: Jeff Beck; Tim Bogert; Carmine Appice; Bobby Tench; Kim Milford

Beck, Bogert & Appice was a rock supergroup and power trio formed by English guitarist Jeff Beck, evolving from the Jeff Beck Group. It included bassist Tim Bogert and drummer Carmine Appice, Americans who had played together in Vanilla Fudge and Cactus.

== History ==
Beck had been keen to work with Tim Bogert and Carmine Appice after encountering the two in 1967 and after subsequent meetings and sessions such as those which took place between July 6 and 10, 1969. In early August 1969, Beck commented to Alan Smith from New Musical Express:

...two name faces to join the group. They're going to be news when they happen, and if I only had the griff on it, if only I had it signed and sealed, I'd tell you. But until then I'm afraid it's all sham. You see, both these name faces are under recording contracts at the moment.

On September 13, 1969, Melody Maker reported in its "Raver" column that Beck had added Carmine Appice and Tim Bogert to his band. Beck and his manager Peter Grant arranged to finalize contracts with Bogert and Appice in November 1969. On November 12, 1969, Beck crashed his car, and all future plans were put on hold. Beck soon recovered from his accident, and in early March 1971, he formed the Jeff Beck Group.

The official demise of the second Jeff Beck Group was announced on July 24, 1972. On the next day Jeff Beck met with keyboardist Max Middleton, Tim Bogert and Carmine Appice. He also brought in Kim Milford as vocalist. Rehearsals at the Rolling Stones' rehearsal rooms in Bermondsey began in preparation for an imminent tour of the U.S., originally arranged for the Jeff Beck Group. In an interview with Danny Holloway from New Musical Express on July 8, 1972, Beck stated:

We've never played what the people wanted to hear in America. They expect vicious, violent rock and roll. That's what I'm known for, but I was avoiding all that in the previous band. I was trying to play subtle rock and roll. That stuff was more suitable for clubs, not big stages. This new group will play much heavier music.

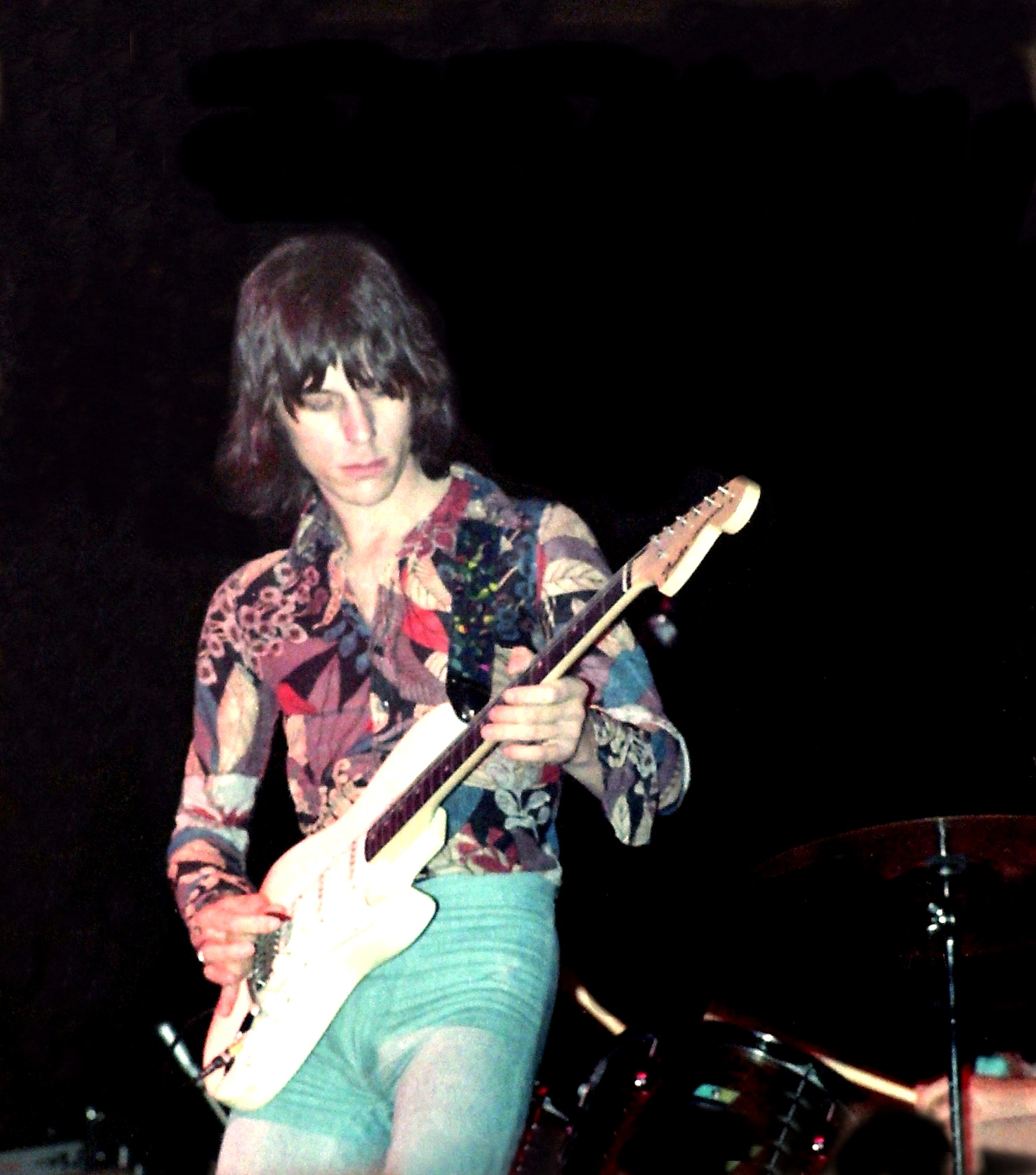
Beck performing with Beck, Bogert & Appice in 1972

On August 1, 1972, the band appeared at the Stanley Theater in Pittsburgh as Jeff Beck Group. After only six appearances, Milford was replaced by Bobby Tench, who was flown in from the UK after the performance at the Arie Crown Theatre in Chicago, and who appeared with the band for the rest of the tour. The tour concluded at the Paramount Theatre in Seattle on August 19, 1972. After this U.S. tour, Tench and Middleton left the band and Beck formed a power trio with Appice and Bogert. Appice and Bogert then split lead vocal duties. Still billed as Jeff Beck Group, the trio was included on the bill for Rock at The Oval (held at The Oval) on September 16, which marked the start of a tour schedule of the UK, Netherlands, and Germany. On Friday October 20, 1972, a U.S. tour began at the Hollywood Sportatorium in Florida and concluded on November 11, 1972, at The Warehouse in New Orleans.

Beck, Bogert & Appice started work on its eponymous debut album Beck, Bogert & Appice at Chess Studios on December 11, 1972, with sessions continuing until December 22. Recording sessions resumed on January 2, 1973, with producer Don Nix, and the trio transferred to The Village in Los Angeles. Don Nix told John Tobler from the magazine ZigZag: "I don't know how I got the job, but I'd sure like to get out of it". The album was released in the U.S. on March 26, 1973, and on April 6 the same year in the UK. It reached No. 12 on the U.S. album chart and No. 28 on the UK album chart on May 10, 1973. James Isaacs, from Rolling Stone wrote:

The band's debut LP is surprisingly docile, when compared to their live show that summons recollections of the Fudge's savage version of "Shotgun" united with Beck's swooping leads. Always a master of unrestraint, Jeff is often subdued here, depending far less on the sound effects and whooshing runs that dominated the two albums with Rod. Good drummer Appice is the designated singer on the remainder of the tunes. While he can at least carry a tune (even if at times he sounds like he's carrying it in a satchel), his [Jack] Bruce-like tenor possesses little flair and scant individuality. Still, it's good to hear stripped-down rock like "Lady", with its Creamy vocal and Whoish crescendos, the boogie lick-trading on "Livin' Alone" and the almost ludicrous sincerity with which Carmine renders Curtis Mayfield's "I'm So Proud".

On February 1, 1973, the trio embarked on a UK tour that took in concert halls and university campus venues, and ended at the Top Rank in Cardiff on February 18, 1973. On February 20, the group appeared on the French TV show Pop Deux in front of 2,000 fans. On March 28, 1973, the band started its U.S. tour at the Music Hall, and Beck unveiled a new effect by using the Talk box for the first time. The trio finished the first part of its tour on April 16, 1973, at Winterland in San Francisco, having played 18 venues. After another tour break the band resumed its tour of the U.S., starting at the Seattle Center Arena on April 26 and finishing at the Honolulu International Centre on May 8; it flew on to a Japanese tour which started at Nippon Budokan on May 14 and ended five days later on May 19, 1973, at Koseinenkin Hall in Osaka.

A tour of Europe started on June 8, 1973 at Hamburg’s Musikhalle and took in the annual European rock festival circuit. The group traveled to venues in West Germany (Summer Rock Festival Berlin June 9, Summer Rock Festival Frankfurt June 10) and the Netherlands (Pinkpop June 11), then arrived in Paris to conclude the tour on June 12, 1973. Another U.S. tour hastily was arranged to cover the East Coast and Southern states, such as Pennsylvania, North Carolina, Florida, Maryland, and Georgia. The tour started on July 11, 1973, and came to an abrupt end when Beck left on July 17.

Live in Japan was released on October 21, 1973. This album was a compilation of performances recorded in Osaka during the May tour in Japan. On November 21, 1973, the band traveled to France to start its second European tour as Beck, Bogert & Appice. After a Christmas break, the band started a British tour, which began at Newcastle on January 10. Fourteen shows followed, taking them to Brighton, Leeds, Liverpool, Sheffield, Bristol, London, Glasgow and Edinburgh. The tour ended on January 29 at the Caley Picture House in Edinburgh.

On January 26, 1974, the band played at the Rainbow Theatre as part of a European tour. This concert was broadcast in full on the U.S. show Rock Around the World on September 9, 1974. This was the last recorded work by the band, and previewed songs intended for a second studio album were included on the bootleg At Last Rainbow. A medley with "You Shook Me" and "BBA Boogie" was included on the Jeff Beck compilation Beckology (1991). Recording sessions for a second studio album began in January 1974. On May 18, 1974, New Musical Express wrote "Rumours concerning an imminent split in BBA, which have been rife for several weeks, were confirmed by bassist Tim Bogert". Melody Maker also reported the breakup of the band at that time. The band dissolved before the completion of a second studio album.

At Last Rainbow song list

- "Laughin' Lady" (5:53)
- "Lady" (7:05)
- "Morning Dew" (12:22)
- "Superstition" (6:07)
- "(Get Ready) Your Lovemaker's Comin' Home" (7:40)
- "Blues De Luxe – You Shook Me" (5:34)
- "Rainbow Boogie" (11:32) ["BBA Boogie"]

== Musicians ==
=== Band members ===
- Jeff Beck – guitar, occasional vocals
- Tim Bogert – bass guitar, lead and backing vocals
- Carmine Appice – drums, lead and backing vocals

=== Vocalists ===
- Kim Milford for six live shows. August 4 to 7, 1972 with Beck, Bogert and Appice, billed as Jeff Beck Group. Milford left the band after the Majestic Theater concert in Dallas.
- Bobby Tench for thirteen live shows. August 8 to September 19, 1972, with Beck, Bogert and Appice, billed as Jeff Beck Group. Tench joined the band for The Arie Crown Theater concert, in Chicago.

=== Keyboardist ===
- Max Middleton for all 19 live shows. Left the group with Bobby Tench.

=== Guest appearances ===
- Danny Hutton and Jimmy Greenspoon on track "Three Dog Night" in backing vocals and keyboards respectively.
- Pete French and Duane Hitchings on track "Lady" as co-writers.

== Discography ==
Studio albums

- Beck, Bogert & Appice (1973) US No. 12, RIAA certification Gold

Live albums

- Beck, Bogert & Appice Live (in Japan) (1973)

Compilation albums

- BBA tracks appear on Beckology (1991)

Box Sets

- Live in Japan 1973/Live in London 1974

Singles

- "Black Cat Moan" / "Livin' Alone" (UK, February 16, 1973)
- "I'm So Proud" / "Oh to Love You" (U.S., May 28, 1973)
- "Lady" / "Oh to Love You" (U.S., July 16, 1973)
