= Carmine Appice (album) =

Studio album by Carmine Appice
- Released: 1981
- Recorded: 1980–1981
- Genre: Rock
- Label: Pasha
- Producer: Richard Podolor

Carmine Appice chronology
| Carmine Appice (1981) | Carmine Appice's Guitar Zeus (1995) |

Rockers is a 1981 album by Carmine Appice and was released on the Pasha Records label.

== Track listing ==
1. "Have You Heard" 4:08 (Carmine Appice, Duane Hitchings, Pete French)
2. "Keep On Rolling" 4:24 (Appice, Danny Johnson)
3. "Paint It Black" 3:44 (Mick Jagger, Keith Richards)
4. "Blue Cafe" 4:03 (Appice, James Ciamond)
5. "Sweet Senorita" 3:04 (Appice, French, Johnson)
6. "Drum City Rocker (Ballad of Drum City Surfer Girls)" 3:20 (Appice, Vinnie Cusano)
7. "Hollywood Heartbeat" 3:58 (Appice, Cyril Cianflone)
8. "Be My Baby" 3:52 (Jeff Barry, Ellie Greenwich, Phil Spector)
9. "Am I Losing You" 3:50 (Appice, French, Ron Leejack)
10. "Drums, Drums, Drums" 3:13 (Appice, Richard Podolor)

== Personnel ==
- Carmine Appice - Drums, Percussion, Lead Vocals
- Danny Johnson - Guitars
- Duane Hitchings - Keyboards
- Jay Davis - Bass
- The Rockers - Background Vocals

Source: Carmine Appice "Carmine Appice" album cover

== Credits ==
- Engineer - Bill Cooper
- Producer - Richard Podolor

== Reception ==
Professional ratings
Review scores
| Source | Rating |
|---|---|
| AllMusic | 3/5 stars |

== Chart performance ==
| Chart (1982) | Peak position |
|---|---|
| US (Billboard Rock Albums) | 38 |
