= Infatuation (Rod Stewart song) =

Single by Rod Stewart

from the album Camouflage
- B-side: "She Won't Dance With Me" (US) "Three Time Loser" (UK)
- Released: May 1984
- Recorded: 1984
- Genre: Rock
- Length: 5:13 (album); 4:03 (single)
- Label: Warner Bros.
- Songwriters: Rod Stewart, Duane Hitchings, Roland Robinson
- Producer: Michael Omartian

Rod Stewart singles chronology
"That's What Friends Are For" (1983)	"Infatuation" (1984)	"Some Guys Have All the Luck" (1984)

Music video
- "Infatuation" on YouTube

"Infatuation" is a 1984 song by Rod Stewart from his thirteenth studio album Camouflage, written by Stewart, Duane Hitchings and Roland Robinson released as the first single from the album.

It features Jeff Beck on guitar, who makes a cameo in the video. It had two different B-sides. The US B-side was "She Won't Dance With Me", which is from his 1980 album Foolish Behaviour while the UK B-side, "Three Time Loser", is from his 1975 album Atlantic Crossing.

== Music video ==
The song's video, directed by Jonathan Kaplan, is a story filmed mostly in black in white. According to VH1's Pop-Up Video, the clip was inspired by the Hitchcock mystery movie Rear Window. In the video, a woman (played by Kay Lenz) moves into an apartment complex where Stewart lives. Shortly after she settles in, Stewart is accosted by the woman's bodyguard (played by Mike Mazurki) asking about her, showing him a picture of her with two mobsters, one of the faces covered by the bodyguard's thumb; Stewart denies knowing the woman, though his apartment walls are covered with numerous pictures he took of the woman in various stages of dress (and undress), mainly at the complex's pool; he is constantly snapping additional pictures or peering into the woman's apartment with his binoculars.

Eventually Stewart's obsession with the woman gets him in trouble; he is caught with his binoculars by the woman's bodyguard, who punches him in the face. After Stewart falls back on his pillow the film changes from black and white to colour, suggesting a dream sequence. The last scene takes a surreal turn, showing Stewart standing at a moving carousel with Lenz trapped in the center while one of the two mobsters (Dick Miller), riding a mount, taunts Stewart.

The video has two different endings. One ending shows the woman waving goodbye to Stewart as she and the other mobster (the one whose face was covered by the bodyguard's thumb in the picture) drive away in a blue convertible, leaving Stewart riding the carousel alone. The other has the mobster driving away alone as Stewart and Lenz ride the carousel together in each other's arms.

Mazurki later said that he got more fame in the making of this video, than in any of the feature films or TV shows in which he had starred.

== Charts ==
The song reached No. 6 on Billboard's Hot 100 chart. On the US dance charts, "Infatuation" was the last of five entries to make the chart, peaking at No. 19.

== Chart history ==
Chart (1984)	Peak position
Paraguay (UPI)	8
Peru (UPI)	1
UK Singles (OCC)	27
U.S. Billboard Hot 100	6
U.S. Billboard Hot Dance/Disco	19
West Germany (GfK)	27

Year-end chart (1984)	Rank
US Top Pop Singles (Billboard)	58

== Parody ==
In the season 29 episode "Springfield Splendor" of The Simpsons, Kipp Lennon sings "Collaboration".
