= Growers of Mushroom =

Studio album by Leaf Hound
- Released: October 1971
- Recorded: 1970
- Studios: Spot Studios (Mayfair, London, England)
- Genres: Hard rock; heavy metal; stoner rock
- Length: 37:10
- Label: Decca
- Producer: Paul Lynton

Leaf Hound chronology
| Growers of Mushroom (1971) | Unleashed (2007) |

Growers of Mushroom is the debut studio album by English hard rock band Leaf Hound. It was originally released in 1970 as Leaf Hound by Telefunken in Germany only. It was re-released in 1971 in the UK by Decca as Growers of Mushroom. It is the only album by the original line-up of the band. Consisting of original material, the album is often cited as a pioneering example of heavy metal, hard rock, psychedelic rock and stoner rock.

Professional ratings
Review scores
| Source | Rating |
|---|---|
| AllMusic | 3/5 stars |

== History ==
Leaf Hound came together in 1970. They signed a contract with management agency Lynton Maitland, who arranged an album deal with Decca and one day of studio recording time. Growers of Mushroom was recorded in one 11-hour session at Spot Studios in Mayfair, London.

All but one of the tracks were composed by members of the band. Most of the material was written by vocalist Pete French and lead guitarist Mick Halls, who were cousins. According to French, late in the recording session they realised that they had run out of songs and time was limited, so he and Halls composed "With a Minute to Go" on the spot. According to an interview with French in 2019, the impromptu composition was "Sawdust Caesar". Another telling has it that "With a Minute to Go" and "Sawdust Caesar" had their titles mistakenly swapped on the record, and were left that way. The title track "Growers of Mushroom" was named after a story from the Pan Book of Horror Stories, about a woman slowly poisoning her husband with toadstools, although the lyrics were more about having a hallucination. The song not composed by the band was "Drowned My Life in Fear", written by Peter Ross.

Following the recording session, Halls told French that they did not need rhythm guitarist Derek Brooks any more, as Halls could do all the guitar playing, so they asked him to leave the band. Bass guitarist Stuart Brooks, his brother, soon left as well, and was replaced by Ron Thomas.

The album was first released in Germany by Decca's licensee Telefunken in 1970 as the self-titled Leaf Hound, comprising just seven tracks, omitting "Freelance Fiend" and "Growers of Mushroom". They also released a single of "Drowned My Life in Fear" with a B-side of "It's Gonna Get Better", a non-album song recorded earlier, with Madeline Bell as backing singer. The band (with Thomas, not the Brooks brothers) did a short tour of Germany and on return to the UK were told by their agency that the album was no longer going to be released there. Disheartened, the band broke up.

Nearly a year later, in October 1971, Decca did release Growers of Mushroom, but with the group already disbanded and not able to promote it, there was little interest from record buyers. Decca themselves knew nothing of the band, even mistakenly thinking they were American. The album cover was created by an artist who, according to French, portrayed the band as "hippie druggies", having only the title of the album to work from. French said the band members were not drug users – "We were quite naive. The most we had was half a pint of lager!"

The album was released on CD in Germany by Walhalla Records with "It's Gonna Get Better" as a bonus track. It was re-released by See For Miles Records in 1994 with two bonus tracks, "It's Gonna Get Better" and "Hipshaker". Akarma Records re-released the vinyl version in 2003 with the one bonus track "It's Gonna Get Better." The band reformed in 2004 and the album was re-released on CD a third time in 2005 by Repertoire Records featuring the two bonus tracks on the See For Miles release as well as a third bonus track, "Too Many Rock 'n' Roll Times", a new recording that later also appeared on Unleashed (2007).

The Decca release is very rare and much sought after by collectors. A copy sold for £11,000 in 2021. It was voted the number one most collectible rock album in Q magazine.

== Track listing ==
1. "Freelance Fiend" (Pete French, Michael Halls) 3:11
2. "Sad Road to the Sea" (French, Halls) 4:16
3. "Drowned My Life in Fear" (Peter Ross) 3:00
4. "Work My Body" (French, Derek Brooks, Stuart Brooks) 8:12
5. "Stray" (French, Halls) 3:48
6. "With a Minute to Go" (French, Halls, S. Brooks, D. Brooks, Keith Young) 4:19
7. "Growers of Mushroom" (French, Halls) 2:17
8. "Stagnant Pool" (French, S. Brooks) 3:59
9. "Sawdust Caesar" (French, Halls, S. Brooks) 4:30

Bonus tracks on 2005 reissue

10. "It's Gonna Get Better" (French, Halls) 3:06
11. "Hip Shaker" (French, Halls) 3:32
12. "Too Many Rock 'n' Roll Times" 3:56

== Personnel ==
- Pete French – vocals
- Michael "Mick" Halls – lead guitar, keyboards
- Derek Brooks – rhythm guitar
- Stuart Brooks – bass guitar
- Keith Young – drums
