= Alex Cooley's Electric Ballroom =

Former music venue in Atlanta, Georgia, USA

Coordinates: 33°46′20.39″N 84°23′5.57″W

Alex Cooley's Electric Ballroom was a music venue located in Atlanta, Georgia that existed between 1974 and 1979. The original owners were Alex Cooley and Mark Golob. It was located in the Grand Ballroom of the Georgian Terrace Hotel at 663 Peachtree Street NE. It became the Agora Ballroom before closing in 1983. The structure burned down in 1987.

The 1969 Atlanta International Pop Festival was organized by a promotional team that included Chris Cowing, Robin Conant and Alex Cooley. Cooley was also one of the organizers of the Texas International Pop Festival a few weeks later on Labor Day weekend, as well as the second, and last, Atlanta International Pop Festival the following summer, and the Mar Y Sol Pop Festival in Puerto Rico from April 1–3, 1972.

Alex Cooley died on December 1, 2015, at the age of 75. A photo of the stage at Alex Cooley's Electric Ballroom featuring Ted Nugent performing appears on the back cover of his first solo album, Ted Nugent.
