= Leaf Hound =

English hard rock band

- Origin: London, England
- Genres: Hard rock; heavy metal; acid rock; blues rock; psychedelic rock
- Years active: 1970–1971; 2004–present
- Spinoff of: Black Cat Bones
- Members: Peter French; Luke Rayner; Pete Herbert; Dominic French
- Past members: Mick Halls; Derek Brooks; Stuart Brooks; Keith George Young; Ron Thomas; Ed Pearson; Jimmy Rowland

Leaf Hound is an English hard rock band established in 1970 by former members of the blues rock band Black Cat Bones. Their 1971 debut album, Growers of Mushroom, is cited as a mixture of hard rock, heavy metal, psychedelic rock and stoner rock, and they are regarded as pioneers of those genres.

== 1970–1971: Original run ==
Leaf Hound was established from a reformed lineup of blues rock band Black Cat Bones, who had released their only album, Barbed Wire Sandwich, in February 1970. The British blues boom was fading by 1970 and the album had not sold well. The band's vocalist left shortly after the release and was replaced by Peter French. Guitarist Rod Price departed soon after to join Foghat, and French added his cousin Mick Halls on guitar. Keith George Young joined on drums. Soon afterwards, French changed the band's name to Leaf Hound, a reference to a Ray Bradbury horror story titled "The Emissary" about a dog that returned from the dead covered in leaves. At this point, the band consisted of French on vocals, Halls on lead guitar, brothers Derek Brooks and Stuart Brooks on rhythm guitar and bass respectively, and Young on drums.

The band recorded Growers of Mushroom at Spot Studios in Mayfair, London, in one single eleven-hour session in late 1970. Soon after, Halls told French that they did not need rhythm guitarist Derek Brooks any more, as Halls could do all the guitar playing, so they asked Brooks to leave the band. His brother Stuart soon left as well, being replaced by Ron Thomas on bass. The band toured Europe as a four-piece and released the "Drowned My Life in Fear" single and the Leaf Hound album in Germany on Telefunken. The Growers of Mushroom album (featuring every track from the self-titled album plus additional tracks) was released on Decca shortly after, but by this time French had already departed the band to join Atomic Rooster for their album In Hearing of. French would also later join to write and record on Atlantic Records the 'Ot 'n' Sweaty album with American hard rock band Cactus. Growers of Mushroom became a collector's item in the years to come and was voted the number one most collectable rock album in Q magazine.

== 2004–present: Re-formation and new music ==
French reformed the band with a new lineup, including Luke Rayner on guitar, in 2004. They released a limited 7" single on Rise Above Records in 2006, featuring a live version of "Freelance Fiend" recorded in Soho, London, in September 2005. The B-side was taken from the same recording.

Leaf Hound released their second studio album, Unleashed, on 12 November 2007 on R.A.R.E. Records. It features eight new compositions and a reworking of Atomic Rooster's "Breakthrough". The album met with critical acclaim from the music press with Kerrang! calling it "as good a rock album as you could hope to hear" and Classic Rock describing it as "an unpretentious hard rock record, relying on strong songs and powerful performances."

The band released Leaf Hound Live in Japan, a live album recorded at a 2012 concert in Tokyo, as a special limited run of 500 copies, consisting of a green-coloured vinyl LP, CD, DVD, and a hand-printed poster album cover. The LP was later released in 2013 featuring a different album cover design on Ripple Music, released on either black vinyl or a CD/DVD package; there was also a limited distribution issued of the vinyl in a yellow-and-black mottled design.

French reformed Atomic Rooster in 2016 with Steve Bolton and performed with them for seven years before leaving the band and reforming Leaf Hound once more in early 2024. The updated lineup, including Pete French on vocals, Luke Rayner on guitar, Pete Herbert on bass, and Dominic French on drums, released their third studio album Once Bitten in May 2025 on Repertoire Records and continued touring soon after.

Wolfmother and Tame Impala have listed the group as an influence.

== Band members ==
=== Current lineup ===
- Peter French – vocals
- Luke Rayner – guitar
- Pete Herbert – bass
- Dominic French – drums

=== Classic lineup ===
- Peter French – vocals
- Mick Halls – lead guitar
- Derek Brooks – rhythm guitar
- Stuart Brooks – bass
- Keith George Young – drums

== Discography ==
- Leaf Hound (Telefunken, 1970, LP)
- Growers of Mushroom (Decca Records, 1971, LP) – same as Leaf Hound, but with additional tracks
- Unleashed (R.A.R.E. Records, 2007, CD)
- Live in Japan (Ripple Music, 2014, CD/DVD)
- Once Bitten (Repertoire Records, 2025, CD/LP)
