= Cactus (American band) =

American rock band

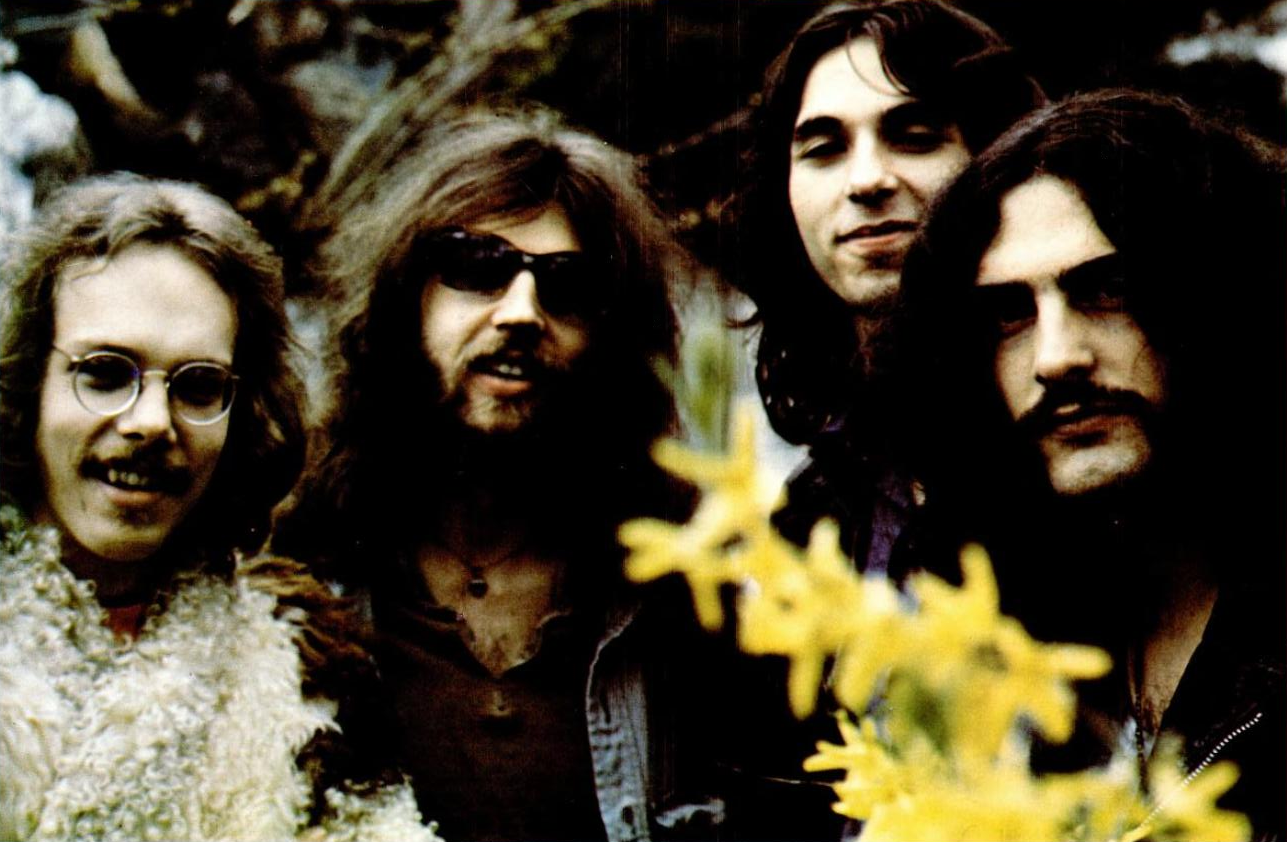
- Cactus in 1970. From left: Tim Bogert, Rusty Day, Jim McCarty, & Carmine Appice

Background information
- Origin: Long Island, New York, U.S.
- Genres: Hard rock; blues rock
- Years active: 1969–1972; 1976–1979; 2006–present
- Labels: Atco, Atlantic
- Members: Carmine Appice; Paul Warren; Jimmy Kunes; Randy Pratt; Jimmy Caputo
- Past members: Jim McCarty; Rusty Day; Tim Bogert; Ron Leejack; Peter French; Werner Fritzsching; Duane Hitchings; Mike Pinera; Roland Robinson; Jerry Norris; Bobby Caldwell; Charlie Souza; Steve Dansby; John Sauter; Gary Moffatt; Elliot Dean Rubinson; Pete Bremy
- Website: cactusrocks.net

Cactus is an American rock band formed in 1969. The lineup of 1970 and 1971, consisting of bassist Tim Bogert, drummer Carmine Appice, guitarist Jim McCarty and singer Rusty Day, released three albums. A new lineup of Bogert, Appice, guitarist Werner Fritzschings, keyboardist Duane Hitchings on keyboards and singer Peter French released the band's fourth album in 1972. The band currently comprises Jimmy Kunes as lead singer, guitarist Paul Warren, drummer Appice, bassist Jimmy Caputo and Randy Pratt on harmonica.

== History ==
=== Original lineup and initial run (1969–1972) ===
Cactus was conceived in late 1969 by former Vanilla Fudge members bassist Tim Bogert and drummer Carmine Appice, after plans to team up with guitarist Jeff Beck were canceled when Beck had an automobile accident and was out of the music scene for over a year. In early 1970, Bogert and Appice brought in blues guitarist Jim McCarty from Mitch Ryder's Detroit Wheels and the Buddy Miles Express, and singer Rusty Day (born Russell Edward Davidson) from the Amboy Dukes.

This lineup released three albums on Atco Records, Cactus (1970), One Way... or Another (1971), and Restrictions (1971), before intraband troubles led to McCarty quitting at the end of 1971. Day was fired from the group shortly afterwards. The fourth and last original Cactus album, 'Ot 'n' Sweaty (1972), featured rhythm section Bogert and Appice joined by Werner Fritzschings on guitar, Duane Hitchings on keyboards and Peter French (ex-Leaf Hound and Atomic Rooster) on vocals. Shortly before the final breakup, guitarist Ricky Ramirez replaced Fritzschings.

=== Disbanding (1972) ===
After Cactus's dissolution in 1972, Bogert and Appice finally joined with Jeff Beck to form Beck, Bogert & Appice. After one studio album, the self-titled Beck, Bogert & Appice (1973) and one live album, Beck, Bogert & Appice Live (in Japan) (1973, released only in Japan), the band dissolved. Their second album remains unreleased to this day, along with recordings of the band's last concert at the Rainbow Theatre in London on January 26, 1974.

Rusty Day, having made a name for himself as a force to be reckoned with in Detroit's rock scene, worked to restore one of Detroit's most legendary bands, the band Detroit, to the national stage. The band Detroit was formed as an offshoot of the Detroit Wheels by members Steve Gaines, Ted "T-Mel" Smith, Nathaniel Peterson, Terry Emery, Bill Hodgeson, and others. The band's initial flame burned out quickly due to many different issues going on at once. A recording exists of Rusty Day, Steve Gaines, and the rest of the band performing in 1973 called The Band Detroit – The Driftwood Tapes.

The New Cactus Band, formed by Duane Hitchings, released one album, Son of Cactus (1973), which featured none of the original Cactus members. Mike Pinera, formerly of Blues Image and Iron Butterfly, came in on guitar, along with Roland Robinson on bass and Jerry Norris on drums. The band then toured live in the Midwest and on the East Coast in mid 1973 with Captain Beyond drummer Bobby Caldwell and former Gregg Allman bass player Charlie Souza. The New Cactus Band soon disbanded. Their sole album peaked at No. 183 on the US Billboard Top 200 Albums chart.

=== Rusty Day's reformed Cactus (1976–1979) ===
In 1976, Rusty Day formed another version of Cactus in Longwood, Florida, where he had relocated. This version of Cactus featured Steve "Kahoutek" Dansby on guitar, John "Soybean Slim" Sauter (who later played on Ted Nugent's Weekend Warriors) on bass guitar and Gary "Madman" Moffatt (who currently plays in .38 Special) on drums. This was the longest lasting 1970s lineup of the band, which ended around 1979. Although this lineup was rumored to have recorded some demos and possibly attempted to record an album, no studio recordings of Rusty Day's Cactus lineup from Florida have ever surfaced. A few live recordings, however, have circulated online.

On June 3, 1982, Rusty Day was murdered at his own house in Longwood, Florida. He and his son were shot to death by one or more unknown drug dealers. The case has never been solved and remains open.

=== Re-formation (2006–present) ===
Cactus re-emerged in June 2006, in New York City: a radio broadcast on The Radiochick Show and their first show since 1972 at B.B. King's Blues Club in Times Square on June 3. This show was a warm up for the gig which sparked the reunion, an appearance at the Sweden Rock Festival in Norje, Sweden on June 9. The 2006 version of Cactus saw original members Appice, Bogert and McCarty reunited and joined by former Savoy Brown frontman Jimmy Kunes on vocals. Randy Pratt joined the band in New York and Sweden on harmonica. The group also released a new album, Cactus V (2006).

In 2008, McCarty left the band and was once again replaced by Werner Fritzchings. Elliot Dean Rubinson replaced Tim Bogert, who retired from touring due to health issues.

In 2011, McCarty returned to the band with Pete Bremy taking over on bass. Bremy also took over for Bogert in Vanilla Fudge and is the only non-original member who has played for both bands. The 2012 lineup was Jim McCarty, Carmine Appice, Jimmy Kunes, Pete Bremy and Randy Pratt.

In early 2016, Carmine Appice announced on his Twitter and Facebook pages that Cactus was coming out with a new album at the end of May that year, "Black Dawn". In early June, Jim McCarty was interviewed on a podcast show, and he said that due to some complications, the release date of Black Dawn had been held up and that it would definitely be out by September (which it was), when the band would be touring for the album, the first show of which would be called the Cactus CD Release Party. McCarty also revealed that the album contained eight brand new songs as well as two never before heard songs by the original band that had recently been unearthed by Carmine Appice.

In 2017, Jimmy Caputo was announced as the band's new bassist and Paul Warren (formerly with Rare Earth, Richard Marx and Rod Stewart) was brought in on guitar, after Jim McCarty was forced to step away from touring due to health issues.

On January 13, 2021, Tim Bogert died at the age of 76 after a long battle with cancer.

== Discography ==
Studio albums

Year of release	Title	US 200	Label
1970	Cactus	54	Atco
1971	One Way... or Another	88	Atco
1971	Restrictions	155	Atco
1972	'Ot 'N' Sweaty	162	Atco
2006	Cactus V	—	Escapi
2016	Black Dawn	—	Sunset Blvd Records
2021	Tightrope	—	Cleopatra Records
2024	Temple Of The Blues: Influences And Friends	—	Cleopatra Records

Live albums

- Tokyo Nights (2014)
- The Birth Of Cactus - 1970 (2022)

DVD

- TKO Tokyo: Live in Japan (2014)

Compilation albums

Year of release	Title	Label
1996	Cactology: The Cactus Collection	Rhino
2004	Barely Contained: The Studio Sessions	Rhino Handmade
2004	Fully Unleashed: The Live Gigs	Rhino Handmade
2007	Fully Unleashed: The Live Gigs Vol. 2	Rhino Handmade
2010	Ultra Sonic Boogie: Live 1971	Purple Pyramid
2013	Cactus/One Way... or Another	Hear No Evil
2013	Restrictions/'Ot 'N' Sweaty	Hear No Evil

Singles

Year of release	Title	Label
1970	"You Can't Judge a Book by the Cover"	Atco
1971	"Long Tall Sally"	Atco
1971	"Token Chokin'"	Atco
1972	"Evil"	Atco
1972	Bringing Me Down	Atco

None of the above listed singles charted in Billboard.

== Bibliography ==
- The New Musical Express Book of Rock, 1975, Star Books, ISBN 0-352-30074-4
