= Beck, Bogert & Appice (album) =

1973 studio album by Beck, Bogert & Appice

Studio album by Beck, Bogert & Appice
- Released: March 26, 1973 (US); April 6, 1973 (UK)
- Recorded: December 1972 – January 1973
- Genres: Hard rock; blues rock
- Length: 36:57
- Label: Epic
- Producers: Don Nix, Beck, Bogert & Appice

Jeff Beck chronology
Jeff Beck Group (1972)	Beck, Bogert & Appice (1973)	Live in Japan (1973)

Professional ratings
Review scores
Source	Rating
AllMusic	2.5/5 stars
Christgau's Record Guide	C
The Rolling Stone Album Guide	2/5 stars

Beck, Bogert & Appice is the only studio album by the rock band Beck, Bogert & Appice, released on March 26, 1973. The group was a power trio featuring guitarist Jeff Beck (who had already been a member of The Yardbirds), bassist Tim Bogert, and drummer Carmine Appice (both formerly with Vanilla Fudge and Cactus).

The album contains Beck's version of the song "Superstition" which was written by Stevie Wonder. The song had grown out of a jam session between Beck and Wonder, with Beck introducing Wonder to the song's iconic opening drum part. In return for Beck's work on Talking Book, Wonder had given the song to Beck to record and release as his own single. Delays in the release of the Beck, Bogert & Appice album, however, meant that Wonder's version was released first.

Beck, Bogert & Appice was released in both conventional 2-channel stereo and 4-channel quadraphonic versions. This was the band's only studio album, as Beck's departure forced a sudden dissolution in 1974.

== Track listing ==
Side one
No.	Title	Writer(s)	Lead vocals	Length
1.	"Black Cat Moan"	Don Nix	Beck	3:47
2.	"Lady"	Jeff Beck; Tim Bogert; Carmine Appice; Pete French; Duane Hitchings	Appice	5:33
3.	"Oh to Love You"	Beck; Bogert; Appice	Appice	4:05
4.	"Superstition"	Stevie Wonder	Bogert	4:19
Total length:				17:45

Side two
No.	Title	Writer(s)	Lead vocals	Length
5.	"Sweet Sweet Surrender"	Nix	Appice	3:58
6.	"Why Should I Care"	Raymond Louis Kennedy	Bogert	3:33
7.	"Lose Myself with You"	Beck; Bogert; Appice; French	Bogert	3:18
8.	"Livin' Alone"	Beck; Bogert; Appice	Appice	4:13
9.	"I'm So Proud"	Curtis Mayfield	Appice	4:11
Total length:				19:19

== Personnel ==
- Jeff Beck – guitars, lead vocals on "Black Cat Moan"
- Tim Bogert – bass guitar, lead vocals (on "Superstition", "Why Should I Care", "Lose Myself with You"), backing vocals
- Carmine Appice – drums, lead vocals (on "Lady", "Oh to Love You", "Sweet Sweet Surrender", "Livin' Alone", "I'm So Proud"), backing vocals

with:

- Jimmy Greenspoon – piano on "Sweet Sweet Surrender"
- Duane Hitchings – piano and mellotron on "Oh to Love You"
- Danny Hutton – backing vocals on "Sweet Sweet Surrender"

== Charts ==
Chart (1973)	Peak position
Australian Albums (Kent Music Report)	45
Canada Top Albums/CDs (RPM)	10
Japanese Albums (Oricon)	22
UK Albums (Official Charts)	28
US Billboard 200	12

== Certifications ==
Region	Certification	Certified units/sales
United States (RIAA)	Gold	500,000^{^}
^{^} Shipments figures based on certification alone.
