= Roland Robinson (musician) =

Roland Robinson (1949, Detroit, Michigan – November 8, 2004, Memphis, Tennessee) was an American longtime Memphis studio session bass player and songwriter.

== Life and career ==
Robinson was a cousin and close friend of Teenie Hodges, Al Green's lead guitarist in the 1970s. For several years, he played with Stax musicians such as Eddie Floyd.

In 1969, Robinson jammed with Jimi Hendrix, Buddy Miles Express' guitarist Jim McCarty, and Hendrix's drummer Mitch Mitchell, a heavily edited recording of which was released as "Jimi/Jimmy Jam" on the posthumous Hendrix compilation album Nine to the Universe. For a few years, Robinson regularly performed and recorded with the late rock and funk drummer Buddy Miles.

In 1973, Robinson worked as a songwriter and performer in a group called The New Cactus Band with Duane Hitchings (an original member of Buddy Miles Express). Cactus released one album on Atco, disbanding shortly thereafter.

Robinson's rock and roll band Quo Jr., composed of veteran R&B players including The New Cactus Band drummer Jerry Norris, opened one show for the Sex Pistols' notorious first U.S. tour at the Taliesyn Ballroom in Memphis in 1978. Quo Jr. performed regularly for several years into the 1980s. Hitchings and Robinson, who also worked together in a group called Steel, later collaborated to write Rod Stewart's 1984 hit song, "Infatuation". Robinson recorded with The Mar-Keys and blues musician Willie Cobbs, among others.
