= Goose Creek Symphony =

American rock band

- Origin: Phoenix, Arizona, United States
- Genres: Country rock, acid rock, folk, surf, rock
- Years active: 1968–1976, 1985, 1990–present
- Labels: Capitol, Columbia
- Members: West Coast lineup Charlie Gearheart (acoustic guitar-percussion-vocals); Paul "Pearl" Spradlin (electric & acoustic guitars-Jew's harp-vocals); Bob "Willard" Henke (electric & acoustic guitars-bass-keyboards-percussion-Jew's harp-vocals); Jon Parry (fiddle); Pat Moore (bass); Dennis Kenmore (drums) East Coast lineup Charlie Gearheart (acoustic guitar-percussion-vocals); Paul "Pearl" Spradlin (electric & acoustic guitars-Jew's harp-vocals); Bob "Willard" Henke (electric & acoustic guitars-bass-keyboards-percussion-Jew's harp-vocals); Jon Parry (fiddle); Dan McGlamery (electric & acoustic guitars-mandolin); David Heyer (drums-percussion); Doug Habbena (bass-vocals)
- Past members: Rick Gilbreath (piano-dec.); Bob James (bass); Paul Byes (drums-vocals-dec.); Dave Birkett (bass); Mickey McGee (drums-dec.); Mike McFadden (guitar-vocals); Doug Haywood (bass-vocals); Fred Weisz (fiddle-banjo-dec.); Ed Black (bass-pedal steel-vocals-dec.); Chris Lockheed (drums); Jim Tolles (fiddle-mandolin-vocals); Harold Williams (alto-tenor-baritone sax-dec.); Randall Bramlett (soprano-alto-tenor sax); Gene Elders (fiddle); Ellis Schwied (fiddle); Chris Mostert (sax-flute); Clarke Pierson (drums); Jack Schroer (sax-dec.); Ray Trainer (bass-guitar-dec.); Cleon Nalley (bass-vocals-dec.); Matt McClure (drums); Scott Carter (bass); Vince Micko (guitar-vocals); Gary Mackey (fiddle-dec.); Sid Walker (fiddle); Gary Oleyar (fiddle); Eric Day (guitar-dobro); Dave Duncan (guitar); Roy Agee (trombone-comedic relief); Howard Naughton (fiddle); Tim Lorsch (fiddle)
- Website: goosecreeksymphony.com

The Goose Creek Symphony is an American rock band with roots in Arizona and Kentucky. It was formed in 1968 in Phoenix, Arizona, as an outlet for the songs of Charlie Gearheart (aka Ritchie Hart).

== Career ==
The band recorded their first album at Audio Recorders in 1968–1969 and was subsequently signed to Capitol Records in 1970. The band continued recording until 1976 and then reformed in 1990. The band is considered one of the tightest, musically, of its genre, and has continued touring to popular acclaim.

The band appeared on The Ed Sullivan Show with Bobbie Gentry. They shared the stage with Jimi Hendrix and The Allman Brothers Band, among others, at the 1970 Atlanta Pop Festival. Charlie Gearheart performed on American Bandstand as Ritchie Hart in 1959. The Goose Creek Symphony was inducted into the Arizona Music and Entertainment Hall of Fame in 2011.

In the 1970s, the band fit into a country rock mode but was more esoteric than many of its contemporaries, and had a rawer, less commercial sound. The band recorded three eclectic albums for Capitol, Goose Creek Symphony Est. 1970 (1970), Welcome to Goose Creek (1971), and Words of Earnest (1972). All three were moderately successful, with the last containing a hit-single cover of Janis Joplin's "Mercedes Benz." Remastered versions of these discs are available on the group's website. In 1974, the band moved to Columbia Records and recorded, to less success, Do Your Thing But Don't Touch Mine. Shortly thereafter, the band took a hiatus that lasted almost 17 years.

In the years since it resurfaced, the band has played many festivals and released several albums, including a live set, The Goose Is Loose, in 1995, which highlights its extended jamming, including the meandering 20 minutes or so of “Talk About Goose Creek and Other Important Places.” Also released was the Acoustic Goose live album, as well as studio albums, including Going Home (1998) and I Don't Know (2003). The band has also released a couple of lost albums, such as Head For the Hills (recorded in 1975—1976, and released in 1997) and recently The Same Thing Again (one music CD and a bonus DVD). The latter was recorded in the mid-1970s and essentially forgotten for three decades. Ironically, the title cut has Gearheart singing “If I could live my life over, I'd do the same thing again. For 20 long years, I’ve picked, and I’ve sung.”

== Discography ==
- Goose Creek Symphony Est. 1970 (1970, Capitol)
- Welcome to Goose Creek (1971, Capitol)
- Words of Earnest (1972, Capitol) Platinum
- Do Your Thing But Don't Touch Mine (1974, Columbia)
- Head For The Hills (never released album from 1975—1976, bootlegged 1977, 1997 CD release, 2009 CD re-release w/bonus track)
- Oso Special (recorded 1985, released 1990, June Appal)
- Live at Appal Shop (1991, June Appal, limited edition release, re-released 1997 as "Acoustic Goose")
- The Goose Is Loose (1995, 2-CD private pressing release, 1996 single-CD release, Winter Harvest, 2007 2-CD re-release)
- Goin' Home (2002)
- I Don't Know (2003)
- Goose on the Lake 2004 (2004)
- Live at the Mountain Arts Center (2004)
- Goose on the Lake 2007 (2007)
- The Same Thing Again (recorded 1977, released 2008)

== Radio and television appearances ==
Goose Creek's mixed-genre versatility is demonstrated in its 2003 appearance as sole guest on Show 259 of the WoodSongs Old-Time Radio Hour. The WoodSongs Archive has both the radio program and a 111-minute video of the show, which includes 20 minutes of performance not included in the hour-long radio show.
