= Live in Japan (Beck, Bogert & Appice album) =

Live album by Jeff Beck
- Released: October 1973 (Japan)
- Recorded: May 18 & 19, 1973
- Venues: Koseinenkin Hall (Osaka, Japan)
- Genres: Blues rock, hard rock
- Length: 87:42
- Label: Epic
- Producers: The Boys (Beck, Bogert & Appice)

Jeff Beck chronology
Beck, Bogert & Appice (1973)	Live in Japan (1973)	Blow by Blow (1975)

Live in Japan is a 1973 release by the rock supergroup power trio Beck, Bogert & Appice. The album, although initially called Beck, Bogert & Appice Live, was only issued in Japan and is also known as Live in Japan. It is generally considered rare due to the fact of it being manufactured in only limited numbers in Japan. Live in Japan was the last LP by Beck, Bogert & Appice and their only live album. Within months of the album's release the band would dissolve after Jeff Beck suddenly decided to leave.

On this record, Beck can be heard heavily using a Heil Talkbox, two years before the release of Peter Frampton's landmark album, Frampton Comes Alive! (1976). The album also contains renditions of songs originally recorded by the Jeff Beck Group, "Plynth", "Going Down", and "Morning Dew" and one Yardbirds number "Jeff's Boogie".

== Reception ==
Stephen Thomas Erlewine in a retrospective review for AllMusic felt the live album worked better than the studio album, but that the music has an appeal only to "diehards".

== Track listing ==
=== 1973 original LP ===
Side one
No.	Title	Length
1.	"Superstition" (Stevie Wonder)	5:17
2.	"Lose Myself with You" (Jeff Beck, Carmine Appice, Tim Bogert, Pete French)	10:49
3.	"Jeff's Boogie" (Beck, Chris Dreja, Jim McCarty, Keith Relf, Paul Samwell-Smith)	3:33

Side two
No.	Title	Length
1.	"Going Down" (Don Nix)	3:32
2.	"Boogie" (Beck, Appice, Bogert)	4:58
3.	"Morning Dew" (Bonnie Dobson, Tim Rose)	14:11

Side three
No.	Title	Length
1.	"Sweet Sweet Surrender" (Nix)	4:43
2.	"Livin' Alone" (Beck, Appice, Bogert)	6:11
3.	"I'm So Proud" (Curtis Mayfield)	5:42
4.	"Lady" (Beck, Appice, Bogert, French)	6:16

Side four
No.	Title	Length
1.	"Black Cat Moan" (Nix)	9:13
2.	"Why Should I Care" (Raymond Louis Kennedy)	7:20
3.	"Plynth/Shotgun (Medley)" (Nicky Hopkins, Rod Stewart, Ronnie Wood, Autry (Junior Walker) DeWalt)	5:57

=== 40th anniversary edition ===
Disc one
No.	Title	Length
1.	"Superstition" (Stevie Wonder)	5:21
2.	"Livin' Alone" (Jeff Beck, Carmine Appice, Tim Bogert)	6:11
3.	"I'm So Proud" (Curtis Mayfield)	5:42
4.	"Lady" (Beck, Appice, Bogert, Pete French)	6:18
5.	"Morning Dew" (Bonnie Dobson, Tim Rose)	14:08
6.	"Sweet Sweet Surrender" (Don Nix)	4:39
7.	"Lose Myself with You" (Beck, Appice, Bogert, French)	10:43
8.	"Black Cat Moan" (Nix)	9:16
9.	"Jeff's Boogie" (Beck, Chris Dreja, Jim McCarty, Keith Relf, Paul Samwell-Smith)	3:32
10.	"Why Should I Care" (Raymond Louis Kennedy)	7:23

Disc two
No.	Title	Length
1.	"Going Down" (Nix)	3:44
2.	"Plynth/Shotgun (Medley)" (Nicky Hopkins, Rod Stewart, Ronnie Wood, Dewalt)	5:30
3.	"Boogie" (Beck, Appice, Bogert)	4:57

== Personnel ==
- Jeff Beck – guitar, talkbox; lead vocals (track 8)
- Tim Bogert – bass guitar, vocals; lead vocals (tracks 1, 7, 10, 11, 12)
- Carmine Appice – drums, vocals; lead vocals (tracks 2, 3, 4, 5, 6, 12)

== Charts ==
Chart performance for Live in Japan
Chart (1973)	Peak position
Japanese Albums (Oricon)	21
Chart (2013) (Note: 40th anniversary edition.)	Peak position
Japanese Albums (Oricon)	32
Chart (2023) (Note: Two-in-one reissue with previously unreleased Live in London 1974 recorded at the Rainbow Theatre on January 26.)	Peak position
Japanese Albums (Oricon)	23
Japanese Hot Albums (Billboard Japan)	27
Swiss Albums (Schweizer Hitparade)	75
