= Jim McCarty (guitarist) =

American guitarist (born 1945)

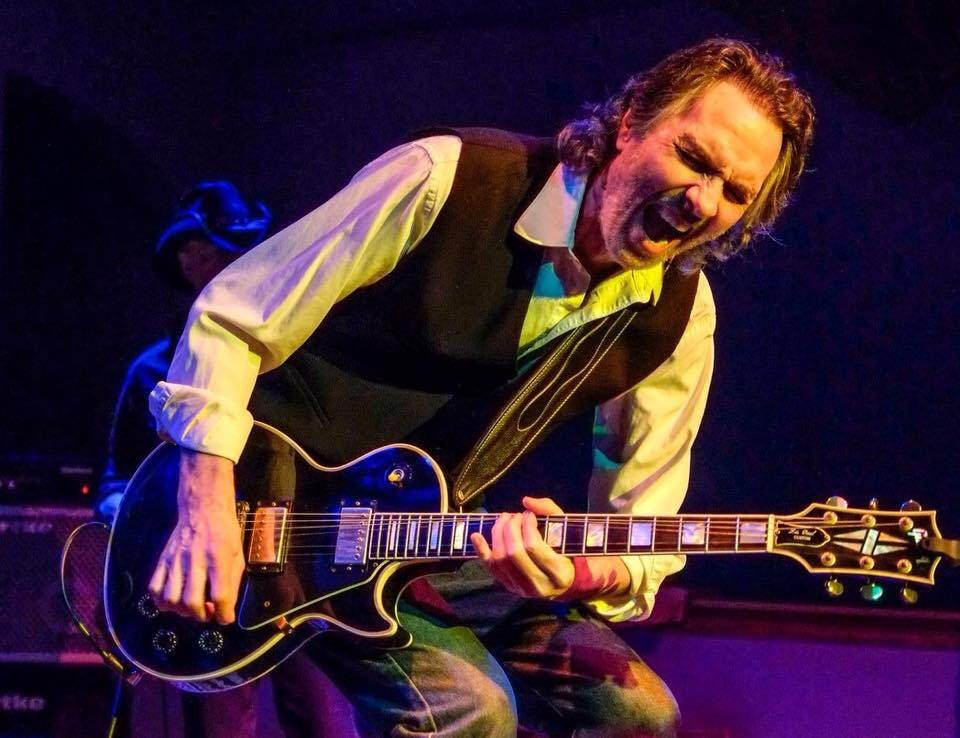
- McCarty in 2016

Background information
- Born: James William McCarty; June 1, 1945 (age 81)
- Genres: Hard rock; blues rock; funk rock; psychedelic rock; rhythm and blues
- Occupation: Guitarist
- Years active: 1960s–present

James William McCarty (born June 1, 1945) is an American blues rock guitarist from Detroit, Michigan. He has performed with Mitch Ryder and the Detroit Wheels, the Buddy Miles Express, Cactus, The Rockets, the Detroit Blues Band, and more recently, Mystery Train. Since about 2014 Jim McCarty has joined forces with Detroit blues guitarist/songwriter Kenny Parker in The Kenny Parker Band along with several other veteran Detroit blues/rock musicians. He also makes guest appearances with other Detroit bands.

He also recorded with Jimi Hendrix and Bob Seger. He plays in a heavy blues-rock style that has inspired fledgling guitar players for more than 40 years.

In an August 2006 interview on VH1 Classic, Ted Nugent remarked "I'm the only guy in rock'n'roll that plays that hollow body jazz guitar (a Gibson Byrdland) and it's because in 1960 I saw Jimmy McCarty creating those big fat full chords like I do on "Stranglehold"; I learned that from Jimmy McCarty. Remember the name Jimmy McCarty. He is as important as Bo Diddley and Chuck Berry and Les Paul...a god on guitar."

== Biography 2006 – present ==
In 2005, Les Paul recorded Les Paul and Friends: American Made, World Played, with an all-star band. He covered "69 Freedom Special", an instrumental tune co-written by McCarty and recorded while in the Buddy Miles Express. In February 2006, Les Paul won a Grammy for his cover of the song, thus propelling McCarty into another award-winning arena as songwriter.

In 2006, he participated in a Cactus reunion, performing in New York City, Sweden, Philadelphia, and Washington, D.C. It coincided with the release of a new Cactus album, Cactus V. In 2007, Cactus played a Detroit date, a McCarty homecoming, to a sold-out, standing-room-only house. After two years in Cactus he left the band: "There were some great moments, but then there was a lot of banging heads together. Eventually I left because it was a frustrating experience for me"

In 2009, a new band, the Hell Drivers, was created. The members are Jim McCarty, Johnny "Bee" Badanjek, Marvin Conrad (bass), and Jim Edwards (vocals). They play a variety of Detroit rock and roll from Iggy Pop, The Rockets, Mitch Ryder, Alice Cooper, Bob Seger and more.

On September 25, 2010, Jim McCarty was inducted into the Canada South Blues Society "Living Blues Museum" located in Windsor, Ontario.

Jim McCarty and Carmine Appice reunited Cactus once again in 2011. This line up included singer Jimmy Kunes, bassist Pete Bremy from Vanilla Fudge, and Randy Pratt on harmonica. This incarnation lasted five years producing two live albums, TKO Tokyo: Live in Japan, An Evening in Tokyo, and a studio album, Black Dawn. They toured the United States, Europe and Japan. McCarty and Bremy left the band in late 2016.

== Selective discography ==
=== Buddy Miles Express ===
• Expressway to Your Skull (1968) Mercury Records, BGO Records

Tracks:

1. Train
2. Let Your Love Light Shine
3. Don't Mess with Cupid
4. Funky Mule
5. You're the One (That I Adore)
6. Wrap It Up
7. Spot on the Wall

• Electric Church (1969) Mercury Records; BGO Records

Tracks:

1. Miss Lady
2. 69 Freedom Special
3. Cigarettes & Coffee
4. Destructive Love
5. Texas
6. My Chant
7. Wrap It Up

Several tracks of Electric Church were produced by Jimi Hendrix including McCarty's Grammy winning song, "69 Freedom Special".

=== Freedom Express ===
. Easy Ridin' (1969) Mercury Records

Tracks:

1. Got to Get Your Lovin'
2. Who Can We Depend On?
3. 7-1/2
4. I Just Started Livin'
5. I Just Want to Be Me
6. You Never Get Too Big
7. Born to Be Wild
8. Tomorrow is Promised (To No One)
9. Don't Bogart Me
10. The Pusher

=== Cactus ===
• Cactus (1970) Atco Records; Wounded Bird Records

Tracks:

1. Parchman Farm
2. My Lady from South of Detroit
3. Bro. Bill
4. You Can't Judge a Book by the Cover
5. Let Me Swim
6. No Need to Worry
7. Oleo
8. Feel So Good

• One Way... or Another (1971) Atco; Wounded Bird

Tracks:

1. Long Tall Sally
2. Rockout, Whatever You Feel Like
3. Rock 'N' Roll Children
4. Big Mama Boogie, Pt. 1 & 2
5. Feel So Bad
6. Song for Aries
7. Hometown Bust
8. One Way... Or Another

• Restrictions (1972) Atco; Wounded Bird

Tracks:

1. Restrictions
2. Token Chokin'
3. Guiltless Glider
4. Evil
5. Alaska
6. Sweet Sixteen
7. Bag Drag
8. Mean Night in Cleveland

• Cactus V (2006) Escapi Records

Tracks:

1. Doing Time
2. Muscle and Soul
3. Cactus Music
4. The Groover(
5. High in the City
6. Day for Night
7. Living for Today
8. Shine
9. Electric Blue
10. Your Brother's Helper
11. Blues for Mr. Day
12. Part of the Game
13. Gone Train Gone
14. Jazzed

• Black Dawn (2016) Sunset Blvd. Records

Tracks

1. Black Dawn
2. Mama Bring It Home
3. Dynamite
4. Juggernaut
5. Headed For a Fall
6. You Need Love
7. The Last Goodbye
8. Walk a Mile
9. Another Way or Another
10. C-70 Blues

Jimi Hendrix

• Nine To The Universe (1980) Reprise Records

Tracks played on: "Jimi/Jimmy Jam"

=== The Rockets ===
• Rockets (1977) Guinness Records

Tracks:

1. Lufrania
2. Juke-Box Daddy
3. Rocket Car Wash Blues
4. Feel Alright
5. Rock 'N' Roll
6. Working Man Blues
7. Thing In "D"

• Love Transfusion (1977) Tortoise International/RCA Records

Tracks:

1. Fast Thing In "D"etroit
2. Fell Out Of Love
3. My Heart Needs You
4. Lookin' For Love
5. I Got To Move
6. Ramona
7. Fly Little Bird
8. Love Transfusion
9. She's A Pretty One

• Rockets (Turn Up the Radio) (1979) RSO Records

Tracks:

1. Can't Sleep
2. Turn Up The Radio
3. Oh Well
4. Lost Forever, Left For Dreaming
5. Long Long Gone
6. Love Me Once Again
7. Something Ain't Right
8. Lucille
9. Feel Alright

• No Ballads (1980) RSO Records

Tracks

1. Desire
2. Don't Hold On
3. Restless
4. Sally Can't Dance
5. Takin' It Back
6. Time After Time
7. Sad Songs
8. I Want You To Love Me
9. Is It True
10. Troublemaker

• Back Talk (1981) Elektra Records

Tracks:

1. Back Talk
2. Jealous
3. Lift You Up
4. Shanghaied
5. Love For Hire
6. I Can't Get Satisfied
7. Tired Of Wearing Black
8. I'll Be Your Lover
9. American Dreams
10. Lie To Me

• Rocket Roll (1982) Elektra Records

Tracks:

1. Rollin' By The Record Machine
2. Rock 'N Roll Girl
3. Gonna Crash
4. (I Wanna) Testify
5. Gimme Your Love
6. Born In Detroit
7. All Night Long
8. Kid With The Heart
9. Rollin' And Tumblin'
10. Mean Streets

• Live Rockets (1983) Capitol Records

Tracks:

1. Rollin' By The Record Machine
2. Desire
3. Can't Sleep
4. Sally Can't Dance
5. Takin' It Back
6. Open The Door To Your Heart
7. Oh Well
8. Turn Up The Radio
9. Born In Detroit

=== Detroit Blues Band ===
• Real Life (1990) Blues Factory Records

Tracks:

1. Back On my Feet Again
2. My Life Is Ruined
3. Luann
4. Go Downtown
5. She Knows It
6. Goin' back to Memphis
7. Scandalous Behavior
8. Walkin Out The Door
9. Treat Me Right

• Can't Get You Off My Mind (1995) No Cover Productions

Tracks:

1. Sister's Got a Lover
2. Tell Me
3. Every Day I Have the Blues
4. Won't You Consider
5. Missing You
6. She Winked Her Eye
7. Too Close for Comfort
8. East Side Gal
9. Tears from My Eyes
10. Can't Get You off My Mind

=== Mystery Train ===
• Love Lost (1998) No Cover Productions

Tracks:

1. I Need You
2. Your Loss Now
3. I'm all alone
4. Where were you baby?
5. Allman Joy
6. Hold it right there
7. Love is a Rough Business
8. Come back to me
9. I'll never turn my back on you
10. Cold wind

• Lexus: Live at the Detroit International Auto Show (2002)

Tracks:

1. Rock with Me
2. Honey Hush
3. Need Your Love So Bad
4. T-Bone shuffle
5. As the years go passing by
6. Help Me
7. Standing on shaky ground
8. Oh Well

• Kenny Parker: Hellfire (2019) Rock-a-While Records

Tracks:

1. I've Got My Eye On You
2. Baby Come Back To Me
3. Blind And Paralyzed
4. Bye Bye Baby
5. Hellfire
6. Goin In Circles
7. Dance With Me
8. I'm Missing You
9. But Then We Danced
10. Half Crazy
11. Back Up Plan
12. Hard Times In The Land Of Plenty
