= Rusty Day =

American singer (1945–1982)

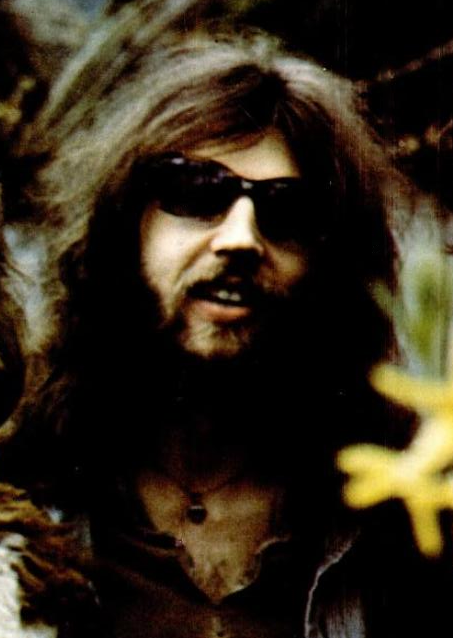
- Day in 1970

Background information
- Born: Russell Edward Davidson; December 29, 1945; Garden City, Michigan, U.S.
- Died: June 3, 1982 (aged 36) Longwood, Florida, U.S.
- Genres: Hard rock; blues rock
- Occupation: Singer
- Instruments: Vocals; harmonica; percussion; drums
- Years active: 1966–1982
- Formerly of: The Amboy Dukes; Cactus; Rusty Day & the Midnighters; Detroit; Uncle Acid and the Permanent Damage Band; The Rusty Day Band

Rusty Day (born Russell Edward Davidson; December 29, 1945 – June 3, 1982) was an American rock singer who worked with Cactus, the Amboy Dukes, and Steve Gaines.

== Career with the Amboy Dukes ==
Day joined the Amboy Dukes in 1969 after their former vocalist was fired. Day had just quit his own band, Rusty Day & the Midnighters. He stayed only for one album, Migration.

== Career with Cactus ==
Cactus was conceived in late 1969 as a supergroup of the Vanilla Fudge rhythm section, bassist Tim Bogert and drummer Carmine Appice, plus guitarist Jeff Beck and singer Rod Stewart. However, Beck had an automobile accident and Stewart joined Ronnie Wood in Faces. Out of frustration, Bogert and Appice formed what became Cactus in early 1970. The cast was complete when Day joined them on vocals and Jim McCarty joined on lead guitar.

Having made a name for himself in Detroit's rock scene, Day worked to restore the Band Detroit to national prominence. The Band Detroit was formed as an offshoot of the Detroit Wheels by members Steve Gaines (who later joined Lynyrd Skynyrd), Teddy "T-Mel" Smith, Nathaniel Peterson, Terry Emery, Bill Hodgeson, and others. There is a recording of Rusty Day, Steve Gaines, and the rest of the band performing in 1973 called The Band Detroit – The Driftwood Tapes, which was released as a Lynyrd Skynyrd bootleg in 1998.

In 1976, Day re-incarnated Cactus by placing an ad in Rolling Stone which stated that he needed exceptionally good guitar, bass, and drums. This lineup lasted from 1976 until 1979, and featured Gary "Madman" Moffatt, who plays drums for .38 Special.

Day claimed to have turned down AC/DC's request to have him join their band to replace Bon Scott, and Rossington-Collins's request to have him replace Ronnie Van Zant. He eventually formed the Uncle Acid & the Permanent Damage Band, which gained him a deal with Epic Records.

Rusty Day formed his last band, the Rusty Day Band, in 1979 and hired Jacksonville guitarist Mike Owings. Owings had just left the Jacksonville, Florida band Lizzy Borden with Steve Gaines' brother, Bob Gaines, as drummer. Owings was then 20 years old.

== Death ==
Day was fatally shot at his home in Longwood, Florida on June 3, 1982, along with is 12-year-old son Russell Davidson, Jr., his dog, and a friend, Garth McRae, 33. The triple murder officially remains unsolved, although the Seminole County Sheriff's Office believes the victims may have known the perpetrator, and that the killings may have been drug-related. In 2011 and 2015, it was asserted that Ron Sanders, guitarist and bandmate in Uncle Acid & the Permanent Damage Band, was the perpetrator of the shooting. Sanders shot himself six weeks after the murders, when police surrounded his home on other matters.

== See also ==
- List of unsolved murders (1980–1999)

== Sources ==
- Knight, K. J. Knight Moves: The K. J. Knight Story. S.l.: Trafford On Demand Pub, 2011. Print.
- Miller, Steve. Detroit Rock City: The Uncensored History Of Rock & Roll In America's Loudest City, 2013, ISBN 978-0306820656
- Simmonds, Jeremy (2012). "Rusty Day". The Encyclopedia of Dead Rock Stars: Heroin, Handguns, and Ham Sandwiches. Chicago Review Press. pp. 163–164. ISBN 978-1556527548.
