= Burning Cats and Amputees =

Greatest hits album by BulletBoys
- Released: April 11, 2000
- Genre: Hard rock
- Length: 51:18
- Label: Cleopatra
- Producer: BulletBoys

BulletBoys chronology
Acid Monkey (1995)	Burning Cats and Amputees (2000)	Sophie (2003)

Professional ratings
Review scores
Source	Rating
AllMusic	link

Burning Cats and Amputees is the first greatest hits album by American rock band BulletBoys.

== Track listing ==
No.	Title	Length
1.	"Hard as a Rock"	3:15
2.	"Smooth Up"	5:05
3.	"Shoot the Preacher"	3:50
4.	"Money"	4:54
5.	"F#9"	3:30
6.	"When Pigs Fly"	4:38
7.	"Thrill That Kills"	3:38
8.	"Talk to Daughter"	3:33
9.	"St. Christopher"	4:56
10.	"THC Groove"	4:21
11.	"Slow and Easy"	2:33
12.	"Rock Candy"	4:48
13.	"Something Good"	2:17
Total length:		51:18

== Personnel ==
- Marq Torien – lead vocals
- Mick Sweda – guitars, backing vocals
- Lonnie Vencent – bass, backing vocals
- Jimmy D'Anda – drums
- BulletBoys – producer
- Barry Conley – engineering, mixing
- Mick Sweda – CD layout
