= Behind the Orange Curtain =

Live album by BulletBoys
- Released: April 3, 2007
- Recorded: 2002–2003
- Genre: Hard rock
- Length: 54:44
- Label: Crash Music Inc.
- Producer: Carlos Bernal, Marq Torien

BulletBoys chronology
Smooth Up in Ya: The Best of the Bulletboys (2006)	Behind the Orange Curtain (2007)	10¢ Billionaire (2009)

Professional ratings
Review scores
Source	Rating
AllMusic	3.5/5 stars

Behind the Orange Curtain is a live album by American rock band BulletBoys. It was recorded in 2002 or 2003.

== Track list ==
No.	Title	Length
1.	"Hard as a Rock"	3:23
2.	"Hell on My Heels"	3:59
3.	"Shoot the Preacher"	4:41
4.	"For the Love of Money"	5:48
5.	"Hang On St. Christopher"	5:11
6.	"THC Groove"	4:10
7.	"When Pigs Fly"	5:08
8.	"Walls"	3:08
9.	"F#9"	4:07
10.	"Toy"	3:39
11.	"Shake Me Awake"	5:48
12.	"Smooth Up in Ya"	5:42
Total length:		54:44

== Personnel ==
- Carlos Bernal – executive producer
- Ryan Hafer – engineer, mixing
- Marq Torien – vocals, producer
- Tommy Pittman – guitar
- Jimmy Nelson – bass
- Pete Newman – drums
