= King Kobra II =

Studio album by King Kobra
- Released: 5 July 2013
- Genre: Hard rock, heavy metal
- Length: 61:47
- Label: Frontiers Records
- Producer: Dave Henzerling, Paul Shortino, Carmine Appice

King Kobra chronology
King Kobra (2011)	King Kobra II (2013)

King Kobra II (or II) is a 2013 album by the hard rock band King Kobra. It was the second release by the band King Kobra since its reformation by founding member Carmine Appice (of Rod Stewart, Ozzy Osbourne and Blue Murder).

It features most of the original lineup, with the exception of new member Paul Shortino on vocals; Shortino had previously appeared on the band's 2011 self-titled reunion album. Shortino and Appice are joined by original members Johnny Rod, Mick Sweda, and David Henzerling.

== Track list ==
1. Hell On Wheels
2. Knock 'Em Dead
3. Have A Good Time
4. The Ballad Of Johnny Rod
5. Take Me Back
6. When The Hammer Comes Down
7. Running Wild
8. The Crunch
9. Got It Comin'
10. Deep River
11. Don't Keep Me Waiting
12. We Go Round

== Personnel ==
- Paul Shortino – lead vocals
- David Michael-Philips – guitars, backing vocals, keyboards
- Mick Sweda – guitars
- Johnny Rod – bass
- Carmine Appice – drums, backing vocals, percussion
