= King Kobra (album) =

Studio album by King Kobra
- Released: April 4, 2011 (Japan); April 15, 2011 (Europe); May 5, 2011 (North America)
- Genre: Hard rock
- Length: 52:03
- Label: Rubicon Records, JAPAN; Frontier Label
- Producer: Dave Henzerling, Paul Shortino, Carmine Appice

King Kobra chronology
Number One (2005)	King Kobra (2011)	King Kobra II (2013)

King Kobra is the fourth studio album by American hard rock band King Kobra. It was released on April 4, 2011 in Japan with 13 tracks and on April 15, 2011 in Europe and May 5, 2011 in North America with only 12 tracks. It is the first album to feature vocalist Paul Shortino and the first since 1986 to feature Johnny Rod, Mick Sweda, and Dave Henzerling (formerly David Michael-Philips) on bass and guitars, respectively.

== Track listing ==
1. "Rock This House" - 4:33
2. "Turn Up the Good (Times)" - 4:41
3. "Live Forever" - 4:21
4. "Tear Down the Walls" - 3:55
5. "This Is How We Roll - 3:42
6. "Midnight Woman" - 4:15
7. "We Got a Fever" - 4:03
8. "Top of the World" - 4:10
9. "You Make It Easy" - 4:40
10. "Cryin' Turns to Rain" - 4:19
11. "Screamin' for More" - 4:38
12. "Fade Away" - 4:46
13. "Red Flags" (Japan Only)

== Lineup ==
- Paul Shortino - Lead and background vocals, guitar
- Dave Henzerling - Lead and rhythm guitars, keyboards, background vocals
- Johnny Rod - Bass
- Mick Sweda - Lead and rhythm guitars
- Carmine Appice - Drums and percussion, background vocals
