= Rocked and Ripped =

Studio album of cover songs by BulletBoys
- Released: August 31, 2011
- Genre: Hard rock, glam metal
- Label: Cleopatra, Deadline

BulletBoys chronology
10¢ Billionaire (2009)	Rocked and Ripped (2011)	Elefante (2015)

Rocked and Ripped is the seventh studio album by the American rock band BulletBoys. The album was released August 31, 2011, on Cleopatra Records. The album consists entirely of cover songs. In addition to the 15 cover songs, the album also features a re-recorded version of the band's 1988 hit "Smooth Up in Ya".

== Track listing ==
Track listing adopted from Discogs:

1. Dr. Feelgood (Mötley Crüe)
2. Livin' On a Prayer (Bon Jovi)
3. Take Me Home Tonight (Eddie Money)
4. Faithfully (Journey)
5. Balls To the Wall (Accept)
6. Free Fallin' (Tom Petty)
7. Renegade (Styx)
8. Falling in Love (Scorpions)
9. Fuckin' Perfect (Pink)
10. The Rover (Led Zeppelin)
11. I'll See You in My Dreams (Giant)
12. Colder Weather (Zac Brown Band)
13. Rehab (Amy Winehouse)
14. Broken Wings (Mr. Mister)
15. Tiny Dancer (Elton John)
16. Smooth Up in Ya (re-recording)

== Personnel ==
- Marq Torien – vocals, rhythm guitar, congas, percussion
- Lonnie Vencent – bass
- Greg Gatti – lead guitar
- Don "Dish" Bish – drums
- Christ Turbis – keyboards
