= Smooth Up in Ya: The Best of the Bulletboys =

Greatest hits album by BulletBoys
- Released: July 18, 2006
- Genre: Hard rock
- Length: 54:44
- Label: Cleopatra

BulletBoys chronology
Sophie (2003)	Smooth Up in Ya: The Best of the Bulletboys (2006)	Behind the Orange Curtain (2007)

Professional ratings
Review scores
Source	Rating
AllMusic	3.5/5 stars

Smooth Up in Ya: The Best of the Bulletboys is the second greatest hits album by American rock band BulletBoys.

== Track listing ==
No.	Title	Length
1.	"Smooth Up in Ya"	5:05
2.	"Hard as a Rock"	3:14
3.	"THC Groove"	4:21
4.	"For the Love of Money"	4:54
5.	"Hang On St. Christopher"	4:55
6.	"Talk to Your Daughter"	3:33
7.	"When Pigs Fly"	4:37
8.	"Slow and Easy"	2:32
9.	"Diss"	4:26
10.	"Toy"	3:20
11.	"Neighborhood"	3:41
12.	"Kiss the Lizard"	3:29
13.	"Amazing"	2:54
14.	"Can I Show You"	3:27
15.	"All Day and All of the Night"	2:36
16.	"Outta Here"	2:55

== Personnel ==
- Anthony Focx – mastering, mixing
