= King Kobra III =

Studio album by King Kobra
- Released: 1988
- Recorded: American Recording, Woodland Hills, Los Angeles; The Edge Studios, Pasha Music House, Baby-O Studios, Record Plant, Hollywood, California; Sound City Studios, Van Nuys, Los Angeles
- Genre: Heavy metal, glam metal
- Length: 39:21
- Label: Rocker Records/New Renaissance
- Producer: Carmine Appice, David Michael-Phillips, Alex Woltman

King Kobra chronology
Thrill of a Lifetime (1986)	King Kobra III (1988)	The Lost Years (1999)

King Kobra III, released in 1988 on New Renaissance Records, was the first and last album by the Edwards, Michael-Phillips, Northrup, Hart and Appice line-up of King Kobra. After the demise of the original line-up, remaining members Carmine Appice and David Michael-Phillips teamed up with Johnny Edwards, Jeff Northrup and Larry Hart, all 3 members of the Sacramento, CA band Northrup at the time.

The album featured a strong selection of 1980s-style mainstream metal. However, a lack of album sales resulted in the dissolution of the band. Bassist Johnny Rod, who appeared on the first two albums as bassist, does not play here. However, he does contribute backing vocals.

The model posing on the album cover is Carmine's then wife, Sarah Appice, who also makes a cameo appearance in the "Take It Off" promotional video.

== Contemporary reviews ==
In the June 1988 issue of Circus magazine, music critic Paul Gallotta noted that following the commercial disappointment of Thrill of a Lifetime (1986), the formation returned to their traditional stylistic strengths, which he characterized as anthemic arena-style rock directed at a younger audience. The review emphasized that the material reached its highest creative points when the vocal harmonies and overall musicianship coalesced effectively. Gallotta singled out the track "Legends Never Die", co-written by Gene Simmons and Paul Stanley of Kiss, alongside the more pop-oriented "Walls of Silence," as standout examples where the record achieved maximum impact.

== Track listing ==
1. "Mean Street Machine" (David Michael-Phillips, Carmine Appice, Bryson Jones) - 4:26
2. "Take It Off" (Phillips, Mark Free, Appice) - 3:58
3. "Walls of Silence" (Jeff Northrup) - 5:23
4. "Legends Never Die" (Gene Simmons, Micki Free, Adam Mitchell) - 5:04
5. "Redline" (Phillips, Appice, Jones) - 4:07
6. "Burning in Her Fire" (Northrup) - 3:33
7. "Perfect Crime" (Northrup, Johnny Edwards, Glenn Hicks, Larry Hart) - 3:56
8. "It's My Life" (Simmons, Paul Stanley) - 3:40
9. "#1" (Phillips, Appice, Jones) - 5:08

== Personnel ==
Band members

- Johnny 'Boy' Edwards – vocals
- David Michael-Phillips – lead and rhythm guitars, acoustic and slide guitars, bass, backing vocals, co-producer
- Jeff Northrup – lead and rhythm guitars, backing vocals
- Larry Hart – bass guitar
- Carmine Appice – drums, backing vocals, producer

Additional musicians

- Johnny Rod, Steve Sacchi, Mark Olsen, Bryson Jones, Peter Criss, Sarah Appice, Bob Spinella, Dave Flynn - backing vocals

Production

- Alex Woltman - engineer, co-producer
- Elliot Solomon - engineer and co-producer on "Take It Off"
- Mark Paladino, Duane Baron, Rick Clifford, Angelo Arcuri, Bret Newman - additional engineering
