= BulletBoys (album) =

Studio album by BulletBoys
- Released: September 20, 1988
- Recorded: One On One Studios, North Hollywood, California, 1988
- Genres: Hard rock, glam metal
- Length: 34:03
- Label: Warner Bros.
- Producer: Ted Templeman

BulletBoys chronology
BulletBoys (1988)	Freakshow (1991)

Singles from BulletBoys
- 1. "Smooth Up in Ya" Released: 1988; 2. "For the Love of Money" Released: 1989

Professional ratings
Review scores
Source	Rating
AllMusic	3.5/5 stars
Kerrang!	4.5/5 stars
The Rolling Stone Album Guide	2.5/5 stars

BulletBoys is the debut album by the American rock band BulletBoys, released in 1988. The cover art is a copy of ".30 Bullet Piercing an Apple" by Harold Eugene Edgerton. The album features the hit "Smooth Up in Ya" as well as a cover of the O'Jay's song "For the Love of Money". The album reached No. 34 in the Billboard 200 chart and was certified gold in 1989 selling over 500,000 copies.

UK-based Rock Candy Records reissued the album on CD in 2014.

== Track listing ==
1. "Hard as a Rock" – 3:03
2. "Smooth Up in Ya" – 4:23
3. "Owed to Joe" – 2:45
4. "Shoot the Preacher Down" – 3:37
5. "For the Love of Money" (The O'Jays cover) – 3:44
6. "Kissin' Kitty" – 3:06
7. "Hell on My Heels" – 3:22
8. "Crank Me Up" – 3:37
9. "Badlands" – 3:07
10. "F#9" – 3:19

== Singles ==
- "Smooth Up in Ya" (US Hot 100 No. 71, US Mainstream Rock No. 23)
- "For the Love of Money" (US Hot 100 No. 78, US Mainstream Rock No. 38)

== Personnel ==
Band members

- Marq Torien – lead vocals
- Mick Sweda – guitar, backing vocals
- Lonnie Vincent – bass, backing vocals
- Jimmy D'Anda – drums

Production

- Ted Templeman – producer
- Jeff Hendrickson – engineer, associate producer
- Toby Wright – engineer
- George Marino – mastering

== Charts ==
Chart (1988–89)	Peak position
US Billboard 200	34

== Certifications ==
Region	Certification	Certified units/sales
United States (RIAA)	Gold	500,000^{^}
^{^} Shipments figures based on certification alone.
