= I'll See You in My Dreams (Giant song) =

Single by Giant

from the album Last of the Runaways
- Released: 1990
- Recorded: March–May 1989
- Studio: Ridge Farm Studio, Rusper, England
- Genre: AOR, hard rock, pop metal
- Length: 4:46
- Label: A&M
- Songwriters: Alan Pasqua, Mark Spiro
- Producer: Terry Thomas

Giant singles chronology
"Innocent Days" (1990)	"I'll See You in My Dreams" (1990)	"Chained" (1992)

"I'll See You in My Dreams" is a power ballad by the American rock band Giant from their debut studio album, Last of the Runaways (1989). It was written by Giant keyboardist Alan Pasqua and independent singer/songwriter Mark Spiro and sung by Dann Huff. The song peaked at numbers 18 and 20 on the US Cash Box Top 100 and Billboard Hot 100. It is also their only Top 40 hit on the Hot 100 chart. The American glam metal band BulletBoys covered the song on their 2011 album Rocked and Ripped, which was a collection of cover songs.

== Personnel ==
- Dann Huff – vocals, guitars
- Alan Pasqua – keyboards, backing vocals
- Mike Brignardello – bass guitar, backing vocals
- David Huff – drums, backing vocals

== Charts ==
Chart (1990)	Peak position
US Billboard Hot 100	20
US Cash Box Top 100	18
