= Icon (band) =

American rock band

- Origin: Phoenix, Arizona, U.S.
- Genres: Hard rock; glam metal; heavy metal
- Years active: 1979–1990; 2008–present
- Labels: Capitol; Atlantic
- Members: Dan Wexler; Stephen Clifford; Tracy Wallach; John Aquilino; Pat Dixon
- Past members: John Covington; Dave Henzerling; Jerry Harrison; Kevin Stoller; Drew Bollmann; David Lauser; Scott Hammons; Sheldon Tarsha; Gary Bruzzese

Icon is an American rock band that formed in 1979 and initially disbanded in 1990, but later reformed in 2008. As of 2024, Icon currently consists of all five members of the classic lineup: Dan Wexler (guitar), Stephen Clifford (lead vocals), John Aquilino (guitar), Tracy Wallach (bass) and Pat Dixon (drums).

== History ==
=== Formation ===
Icon was formed in 1981 in Phoenix, Arizona, by high school friends Dan Wexler (guitar), Stephen Clifford (lead vocals) and Tracy Wallach (bass).

Wallach, Clifford and Wexler started playing together in 1973 in a cover band called Ice that played parties locally

In 1979 they changed their name to Schoolboys and were joined by Dave Henzerling (guitar) and John Covington (drums) from a band initially called Driver (which also had Jim Seagraves on vocals. Schoolboys independently released an EP Singin' Shoutin' in 1980 and had a few songs on local compilation albums. Mike Varney of Shrapnel Records discovered the band through the EP and contacted Wexler for a possible album recording in 1982. In September 1983, they were still going by the Schoolboys name and prepared to record their debut album in San Francisco, produced by Varney and on the Shrapnel label.

With the help of Varney, the band was signed to Capitol Records in 1984 and changed their name first to Martial Arts and finally Icon. By this point, Henzerling and Covington had left the band and were replaced by John Aquilino (guitar) and Pat Dixon (drums) (former drummer for Loosely Tight).

=== Background ===
In 1984, Icon released their self-titled debut, Icon, recorded in the Summer of 1983 and produced by Shrapnel Records owner Mike Varney, and toured to support it. The tour set list featured quite a few new songs intended for the next album as well as a few Deep Purple ("Highway Star") and Judas Priest covers.

In 1985, Night of the Crime was released, produced by Eddie Kramer, mixed by Ron Nevison and featuring the songwriting talent of Bob Halligan Jr. During the mixing of the album, vocalist Stephen Clifford decided to leave the band for personal reasons. Regrouping, the band tried out a few different vocalists, lost their record deal and released a local-only cassette; More Perfect Union, featuring a polished pop-rock sound, a new singer (Jerry Harrison) and a keyboardist (Kevin Stoller). Although it was only released locally, it garnered enough attention to renew major-label interest in the group.

In 1989, Right Between the Eyes was released on Atlantic/Megaforce, with Jerry Harrison on vocals and Drew Bollmann on second guitar. A video for "Taking My Breath Away" was played on MTV's Headbangers' Ball. Following the release of Right Between the Eyes and a supporting tour in the US opening for Ace Frehley and in the UK for King's X, the later included David Lauser on drums (currently Sammy Hagar's drummer) replacing Dixon, Icon disbanded.

In 1994, (An Even) More Perfect Union—an expanded version of A More Perfect Union, including tracks recorded for potential release on Right Between the Eyes—was released on CD. In 1999, a full live concert from 1984 was released on CD and video under the name Icon - 1984: Live Bootleg.

Both the original self-titled album Icon and Night of the Crime were remastered and re-released in 2000 by French hard rock label AxeKiller. "Night of the Crime" was remastered again in 2009 by UK label Rock Candy Records who later also remastered the debut album.

=== Reunion ===
In August 2008, Icon celebrated their reunion with a re-issue of the 1984 Bootleg Concert on DVD. Original members Wexler, Aquilino and Dixon, along with former member Dave Henzerling and new singer Scott Hammons had plans to record new material potentially for a new album.

On November 29, 2008, Icon opened up for Tesla at the Dodge Theatre in their home town of Phoenix, Arizona. They received a very warm reception. Copies of their 1984 DVD were signed and sold and the band promised that new material was on the way. 93.3 KDKB, the local rock station, plugged Icon as a band they love yet rarely play.

In May 2009, singer Scott Hammons decided to pursue a solo career so he decided to leave the band and was replaced with former Adler's Appetite vocalist Sheldon Tarsha, with whom the band played at Rocklahoma and opened for Queensrÿche in 2010. Previous plans to record new songs—possibly for a new album—still existed. However, Tarsha has left the band and original singer Stephen Clifford has been with the band since 2011.

Icon is still active as of 2025. Their current lineup is the same as the one that recorded their first two albums, Icon and Night of the Crime—vocalist Stephen Clifford, guitarists Dan Wexler and John Aquilino, bassist Tracy Wallach and drummer Pat Dixon—and the band is currently working on a new album.

=== Side projects ===
Wexler participated in other musical projects after Icon's disbandment, most notably co-writing several tracks with Alice Cooper, playing guitar on the "Self-titled" album by Stephen Christian and releasing an album with the band Thieves in the Temple.

After Icon disbanded, Harrison recorded an album with a new project called Harlequin.

Henzerling was one of the guitarists for Carmine Appice's band King Kobra; played on the Lizzy Borden album Master of Disguise; and later joined forces with Wexler and Dixon (and Asphalt Ballet singer Tommy Dean) in the band Tomcats. Several Icon members and Surgical Steel drummer Bob Milan backed Arizona vocalist Lydian on her 1990 album With a Vengeance.

Covington played with early Mötley Crüe and Dokken guitarist Greg Leon in the Greg Leon Invasion before joining Henzerling in the band Big Cock who released three albums from 2005 to 2007.

Icon also did a project together with lead singer Randy Baker, founder of the original Strange Daze a Tribute to the Doors band which included a four-song demo and performing live. According to Baker, "I was never a member of Icon we did a project together as suggested by mutual management."

Clifford self-released an album called Search for the Truth in 1994. Icon members Wexler, Aquilino and Dixon performed on this album.

== Members ==
Current

- Dan Wexler – guitar, backing vocals (1979–1990, 2008–present)
- Stephen Clifford – lead vocals (1979–1985, 2010–present)
- Tracy Wallach – bass, backing vocals (1979–1990, 2024–present)
- John Aquilino – guitar, backing vocals (1981–1987, 2008–present)
- Pat Dixon – drums (1981–1989, 2008–2010, 2024-present)

Former

- Dave Henzerling – guitar, backing vocals (1979–1981); bass, backing vocals (2008–2024)
- John Covington – drums (1979–1981)
- Jerry Harrison – lead vocals (1985–1990)
- Kevin Stoller – keyboards (1987–1989)
- Drew Bollmann – guitar, backing vocals (1989–1990)
- David Lauser – drums (1989–1990)
- Scott Hammons – lead vocals (2008–2009)
- Sheldon Tarsha – lead vocals (2009–2010)
- Gary Bruzzese – drums (2010–2024)

Session

- Mark Prentice – keyboards on More Perfect Union (1987); keyboards on "Forever Young" from Right Between the Eyes (1989)
- Mark Seagraves – keyboard programming on More Perfect Union (1987)
- John Aquilino – guitar on More Perfect Union (1987)
- Alice Cooper – vocals on "Two for the Road" and featured character on "Holy Man's War" from Right Between the Eyes (1989)
- Kevin Stroller – keyboards on Right Between the Eyes (1989)

Timeline

== Discography ==
=== Studio albums ===
- Icon (1984)
- Night of the Crime (1985)
- More Perfect Union (1987)
- Right Between the Eyes (1989)

=== Live albums ===
- 1984: Live Bootleg CD and VHS (1999)

Video and live sound recording by Paul Gasparola

=== Compilation albums ===
- An Even More Perfect Union (1995)

=== Music videos ===
- On Your Feet (1984)
- Danger Calling (1985)
- Taking My Breath Away (1989)
