= Right Between the Eyes =

Right Between the Eyes may refer to:

- Right Between the Eyes (album), a 1989 album by Icon, or the title song
- "Right Between the Eyes" (Wax song), 1986
- "Right Between the Eyes" (Tom Dice song), 2016
