= Thrill of a Lifetime =

Thrill of a Lifetime may refer to:

- Thrill of a Lifetime (TV series), a Canadian television reality series
- Thrill of a Lifetime (film), a 1937 American comedy film
- Thrill of a Lifetime (album), a 1986 album by King Kobra
