= Ready to Strike =

Studio album by King Kobra
- Released: February 28, 1985
- Recorded: 1984
- Studio: Pasha Music House Hollywood, California
- Genres: Heavy metal; glam metal
- Length: 39:18
- Label: Capitol/EMI
- Producers: Spencer Proffer; Carmine Appice

King Kobra chronology
Ready to Strike (1985)	Thrill of a Lifetime (1986)

Singles from Ready To Strike
- 1. "Hunger" / "Attention" Released: 1985; 2. "Tough Guys" Released: 1985

Professional ratings
Review scores
Source	Rating
Allmusic	3/5 stars

Ready to Strike is the debut studio album by American heavy metal band King Kobra, released in 1985 by Capitol Records.

The single "Hunger" was written by members of the Canadian metal band Kick Axe and was released by them in 1986 in The Transformers: The Movie soundtrack album, under the alias Spectre General.

== Track listing ==
1. "Ready to Strike" (King Kobra, H. Banger, Spencer Proffer) - 5:20
2. "Hunger" (Proffer, Larry Gillstrom, Brian Gillstrom, Victor Langen, George Criston, Raymond Harvey) - 3:26
3. "Shadow Rider" (King Kobra, H. Banger, Proffer) - 4:04
4. "Shake Up" (King Kobra, H. Banger, Proffer) - 3:29
5. "Attention" (King Kobra, H. Banger, Proffer) - 3:43
6. "Breakin' Out" (King Kobra) - 3:59
7. "Tough Guys" (King Kobra, H. Banger, Proffer) - 4:21
8. "Dancing with Desire" (King Kobra, H. Banger, Proffer) - 5:36
9. "Second Thoughts" (King Kobra, Proffer) - 3:47
10. "Piece of the Rock" (Proffer, L.Gillstrom, B.Gillstrom, Langen, Criston, Harvey) - 3:33

== Personnel ==
Production and performance credits are adapted from the album liner notes.

Band members

- Mark Free – lead and backing vocals
- David Michael-Philips – lead and rhythm guitars, guitar synthesizer, backing vocals
- Mick Sweda – lead and rhythm guitars, guitar synthesizer, backing vocals
- Johnny Rod – bass, backing vocals
- Carmine Appice – drums, electric and acoustic percussion, backing vocals, associate producer

Production

- Spencer Proffer – producer (for Pasha), additional engineer, arrangements
- King Kobra – arrangements, cover concept
- Duane Baron – engineer
- Alex Woltman – assistant engineer
- Hanspeter Huber – additional engineer
- George Marino – mastering at Sterling Sound, New York
- Vigon Seireeni – art direction, design
- Ray Tusken – A&R coordination for Capitol
- Carol Peters – coordination for Pasha
- Cathy Goodman – coordination for Miller Management
- Allan Miller – management for Miller Management

== Charts ==
Chart (1985)	Peak position
US Billboard 200	136
