= Mick Sweda =

American guitarist

- Born: April 18, 1960 (age 65); Gowanda, New York, U.S.
- Occupation(s): Musician, songwriter
- Instrument(s): Guitar, synthesizers
- Years active: 1980–present
- Formerly of: King Kobra, BulletBoys

Mick Sweda (born April 18, 1960) is an American guitarist, best known as a former member of the rock bands King Kobra and BulletBoys.

== Early life ==
Mick Sweda began playing guitar at age 17. He attended community college in Jamestown, New York on a drama scholarship while simultaneously touring the East Coast of the United States with a band covering various acts such as ZZ Top and Cheap Trick.

== Career ==
In 1980, Sweda and a few friends formed a band called The Pedestrians that leaned towards punk rock. A year later, they moved to Los Angeles, where Sweda got involved in various musical projects. In 1984, he was approached by Carmine Appice to join his new band King Kobra, which had been signed to Capitol Records. Sweda recorded two records with King Kobra (Ready to Strike and Thrill of a Lifetime) and toured extensively, opening for bands such as Iron Maiden, Kiss and Ted Nugent. Sweda left the band in 1987 and started BulletBoys with Marq Torien, who had briefly served as King Kobra's lead singer. The band signed to Warner Bros. Records in 1988. Upon the release of their eponymous debut, the band toured extensively opening for bands such as Cheap Trick, Bon Jovi, Ozzy Osbourne, Cinderella and others, as well as headlining theaters. BulletBoys recorded two more records for Warner Bros., Freakshow and Za-Za. Sweda said that inspiration for the former came from taking in the scene at truck stops while the band was on tour. Sweda supported both records with tours before he left the band.

=== Solo work ===
In 1993, Sweda started recording music of his own, which varied between hard rock, blues and jazz, amounting to six albums. After recording demos for a wide range of artists in his studio and doing some session work, Sweda formed a band called Brain Stem Babies which included Jason Hook and Jeremy Spencer. They played scattered shows but spent the majority of their time recording records which Sweda made available on his Monsters Making Music label. The band parted ways in 1996 and Sweda, along with BSB bassist Jon Winquist, recruited Troy Patrick Farrell of White Lion to form Lolligag. They played occasionally in Los Angeles but again spent more time recording and disbanded in 1998.

Sweda continued to record with John Porter and Marty Horenburg at Cello Studios in Hollywood, but began to concentrate more on family matters after he moved to Merced, California in 2002 to be closer to his wife Shellie's family. After forming Mick Sweda and the Candy Bar Band in 2007, he released Songs in the Key of Cool, a record geared towards kids and parents alike. Shellie came up with two of the songs on the album, "Only Monster In My Room Is Me" and "Nothing To Do".

Sweda played guitar on two more King Kobra records released on Frontier Records. He co-wrote an original Christmas song with Tilli Tills called "Merry Christmas, little baby!", which was featured on Rodney Bingenheimer's radio show on KROQ. He released The Hot Summers album with Shane Tassart.

== Personal life ==
Sweda lives in Los Angeles, where he is still active, and works in his own studio, Redcake Digital. He is married to Shellie and has a son, Wyatt. He also has a son by the name of Easton Rocket Sweda, who is an actor on General Hospital.
