= Icon (Icon album) =

Studio album by Icon
- Released: 1984
- Studio: Prairie Sun (Cotati, California)
- Genre: Heavy metal
- Length: 36:49
- Label: Capitol
- Producer: Mike Varney

Icon chronology
Icon (1984)	Night of the Crime (1985)

Singles from Icon
- 1. "On Your Feet" / "Hot Desert Night" Released: 1984; 2. "(Rock On) Through the Night" / "World War" Released: 1984

Professional ratings
Review scores
Source	Rating
AllMusic	4/5 stars
Collector's Guide to Heavy Metal	7/10
Kerrang!	(very favorable)

Icon is the debut studio album by American rock band Icon, released in 1984 by Capitol Records. It included their biggest metal radio hit song, "On Your Feet". It is considered a dynamic record in the same melodic heavy metal vein traditional of Dokken. The album debuted on the Billboard 200 chart on June 9, 1984, at #194, and reached #190 on June 16, 1984, a week later.

The album was recorded mostly in the summer of 1983, with three additional songs "World War", "Killer Machine" and "Rock'N Roll Maniac" recorded in the winter to replace the two "weakest" songs to make a stronger album.

The band toured the United States extensively to support the album, mainly headlining big clubs but also playing with other bands such as Accept and Autograph.

The album was re-released the same year with songs 1 and 3 remixed, and a video was made for the remix of "On Your Feet". The album has seen multiple re-releases on CD, in Japan and on the European labels Bear Tracks, AxeKiller and Rock Candy.

== Track listing ==
Side one

1. "(Rock On) Through the Night" (Dan Wexler, Stephen Clifford, John Aquilino) – 3:31
2. "Killer Machine" (Aquilino, Wexler) – 3:31
3. "On Your Feet" (Aquilino, Clifford) – 3:22
4. "World War" (Wexler, Tracy Wallach, Clifford) – 4:30
5. "Hot Desert Night" (Wexler, Clifford) – 3:49

Side two

6. "Under My Gun" (Wexler) – 3:30
7. "Iconoclast" (Wexler, Aquilino) – 1:26
8. "Rock n' Roll Maniac" (Wexler, Clifford, Aquilino, Wallach, Pat Dixon) – 3:58
9. "I'm Alive" (Wexler) – 4:08
10. "It's Up to You" (Wexler, Clifford, Wallach) – 5:05

== Personnel ==
Icon

- Stephen Clifford – vocals
- John Aquilino – guitars
- Dan Wexler – guitars, vocals
- Tracy Wallach – bass, vocals
- Pat Dixon – drums

Production

- Mike Varney – producer
- Allen Sudduth – engineer
- Stephen Marcussen – mastering at Precision Lacquer, Hollywood, California
- Roy Kohara – art direction
- James Dowlen – cover illustration
- John O'Brien – logo design
- Rick Monzon – logo illustration
- Karen Filter – photography
- Volker Kurze – re-issue producer
- Peter Morticelli – manager

== Charts ==
Chart (1984)	Peak position
US Billboard 200	190
