= Last of the Runaways =

Studio album by Giant
- Released: 1989
- Recorded: March–May 1989
- Studios: Ridge Farm, Rusper, England; Farmyard, Master Rock
- Genres: AOR; hard rock; pop metal
- Length: 55:16
- Labels: A&M; CD 5272
- Producer: Terry Thomas

Giant chronology
| Last of the Runaways (1989) | Time to Burn (1992) |

Last of the Runaways is the debut 1989 studio album by American rock band Giant. It included the hit "I'm a Believer" along with the band's biggest hit, "I'll See You in My Dreams".

== Critical reception ==
Professional ratings
Review scores
| Source | Rating |
|---|---|
| AllMusic | 3.5/5 stars |

The Washington Post concluded: "The Top 40 strategies of industry vets Dann and David Huff's quartet are so airtight they're suffocating; Latest of the Pop-Metal Careerists would be a more appropriate title."

== Track listing ==
1. "I'm a Believer" (Dann Huff, David Huff, Alan Pasqua, Mark Spiro, Phil Naish) – 5:45
2. "Innocent Days" (Dann Huff, Spiro) – 5:15
3. "I Can't Get Close Enough" (Dann Huff, Spiro) – 6:06
4. "I'll See You in My Dreams" (Pasqua, Spiro) – 4:46
5. "No Way Out" (Dann Huff, Terry Thomas, Pasqua, David Huff) – 4:04
6. "Shake Me Up" (Dann Huff, Pasqua, Mike Brignardello, Thomas) – 4:16
7. "It Takes Two" (Pasqua, Spiro) – 4:59
8. "Stranger to Me" (Dann Huff, Brignardello, Thomas) – 5:56
9. "Hold Back the Night" (Dann Huff, Spiro, Pasqua) – 4:11
10. "Love Welcome Home" (Dann Huff, Spiro, Naish) – 4:51
11. "The Big Pitch" (Dann Huff, Thomas, Pasqua) – 5:07

== Personnel ==
Giant

- Dann Huff – lead, rhythm and acoustic guitars, vocals
- Alan Pasqua – keyboards and backing vocals
- Mike Brignardello – bass guitar and backing vocals
- David Huff – drums and backing vocals

Additional personnel

- Lea Hart, Peter Howarth, Terry Thomas – backing vocals

Production

- Produced by Terry Thomas
- Recorded by Rafe McKenna
- Mixed by Rafe McKenna and Terry Thomas
- Mix assistants on tracks 1, 2, 5 and 7-11: Jon Mallison; mix assistant on tracks 3, 4 and 6: Mark Willie
- Mastering: Arnie Acosta
