= More Perfect Union (album) =

- Cover of the 1995 CD re-issue

Studio album by Icon
- Released: 1987
- Recorded: Chaton Studios, Phoenix, Arizona
- Genre: Hard rock, glam metal
- Length: 36:44; 70:16 (re-issue)
- Label: Independently released, Epilogue Entertainment (re-issue)
- Producer: Dan Wexler, Steve Escallier

Icon chronology
Night of the Crime (1985)	More Perfect Union (1987)	Right Between the Eyes (1989)

More Perfect Union is a 1987 release by American rock band Icon. The album, initially released on cassette only, featured a Capitol Records logo like their previous two major label albums, but was in essence an independent release as guitarist Dan Wexler states that, "We lost the deal from Capitol in October/November 1985." After losing the deal and frontman Stephen Clifford, the band played a few shows with new singer Steven Young. However, before starting work on this album, he was replaced by Jerry Harrison, as guitarist John Aquilino was replaced by keyboardist Kevin Stoller, known for his work with Stevie Nicks among others. The cassette originally contained ten tracks, sold out quickly and became a sought-after collectible due to the band's worldwide cult status. Due to fan demand, the album was re-released in 1995 on CD with the title An Even More Perfect Union and included seven bonus tracks, selling initially as a limited numbered edition autographed by Dan Wexler. The later printings are easily identified as they have the logo and title in a different color.

== Track listing ==
No.	Title	Length
1.	"In Your Eyes"	3:56
2.	"Local Heroes"	4:47
3.	"One Step Behind"	3:42
4.	"Walk Away"	3:42
5.	"Forever Young"	3:49
6.	"Lost Love"	2:50
7.	"Eyes of a Prisoner"	4:31
8.	"Better Left Unsaid"	4:29
9.	"Left to Be Alone"	4:58
10.	"Hold On"	4:35

1995 CD reissue bonus tracks
No.	Title	Length
11.	"Way Back to My Heart"	4:08
12.	"Stranger Things"	4:02
13.	"Strong Love"	3:58
14.	"Second Hand People"	4:44
15.	"Sweet Young Sinner"	4:29
16.	"Gold Bullets"	3:51
17.	"Little Drummer Boy"	3:45

== Personnel ==
Band members

- Jerry Harrison – vocals
- Dan Wexler – guitars
- Kevin Stoller – keyboards, synthesizers
- Tracy Wallach – bass, backing vocals
- Pat Dixon – drums, electronic drums

Additional musicians

- Mark Prentice – keyboards
- Mark Seagraves – keyboard programming
- John Aquilino – guitars
- Steven Escallier – tambourine, handclaps

Production

- Mixed at Chaton Studios, Phoenix, Arizona and Prairie Sun Studios, Cotati, California
- Produced by Dan Wexler and Steve Escallier
- Arranged by: Pat Dixon, Dan Wexler, Jerry Harrison & Tracy Wallach
- Additional engineering: Andy Seagle, Bob Frasier
- Remixed by: Dan Wexler
- Coordinator: Nu Media Music Film, S. "Tito" Bombaci
