= Night of the Crime =

Studio album by Icon
- Released: September 20, 1985
- Studio: Bearsville Studios, Bearsville, New York and Chaton Studios, Phoenix, Arizona
- Genre: Glam metal; hard rock
- Length: 41:00
- Label: Capitol
- Producer: Eddie Kramer

Icon chronology
Icon (1984)	Night of the Crime (1985)	More Perfect Union (1987)

Professional ratings
Review scores
Source	Rating
AllMusic	3/5 stars
Collector's Guide to Heavy Metal	4/10
Kerrang!	5/5 stars

Night of the Crime is the second album by American rock band Icon. It was far more polished than their self-titled debut and forayed into areas of glam only previously alluded to on their debut. It was produced and engineered by Eddie Kramer.

Around 30 songs were demoed for the album, and Kramer's version included one more finished track, "Hang Tough" (later covered by Pretty Maids). Ron Nevison mixed the album and "Hang Tough" did not make it to the final release. The band collaborated with Bob Halligan Jr. to complete three of their own songs and recorded three more that he wrote.

The album has, like the debut, been remastered and re-released several times on CD. Night of the Crime was voted third best AOR album of all time by Kerrang! magazine readers in 1988, behind multimillion-selling classic albums by Journey and Michael Bolton.

== Track list ==
Side one

1. "Naked Eyes" (Bob Halligan Jr., John Aquilino) – 4:04
2. "Missing" (Halligan Jr.) – 4:30
3. "Danger Calling" (Halligan Jr., Dan Wexler) – 3:39
4. "(Take Another) Shot at My Heart" (Wexler, Stephen Clifford) – 3:23
5. "Out for Blood" (Wexler, Aquilino) – 5:40

Side two

6. "Raise the Hammer" (Halligan Jr.) – 3:33
7. "Frozen Tears" (Halligan Jr.) – 4:00
8. "Whites of Their Eyes" (Halligan Jr., Wexler) – 3:43
9. "Hungry for Love" (Wexler, Clifford) – 4:17
10. "Rock My Radio" (Wexler, Clifford, Mike Varney) – 4:14

== Personnel ==
Icon

- Stephen Clifford – vocals, backing vocals
- Dan Wexler – guitars
- John Aquilino – guitars
- Tracy Wallach – bass, backing vocals
- Pat Dixon – drums, percussion

Production

- Eddie Kramer – producer for Remarkable Productions Inc., engineer
- Mark McKenna – engineer
- Bill Scheniman – additional engineer
- Chris Isca – additional engineer
- Steve Escallier – additional engineer
- Ron Nevison – mixing at The Record Plant, Los Angeles
- Dan Wexler – mixing assistant
- Mike Clink – mixing assistant
- Mike Reese – mastering
- Tom Muller – CD mastering
- Stan Watts – illustrations
- Klee Shea – design
- Karen Filter – photography
- Norman Seeff – photography
- Volker Kurze – reissue producer for ATM Records
