= Time to Burn (Giant album) =

Studio album by Giant
- Released: March 31, 1992
- Recorded: 1991–1992
- Studio: Kiva Recording Studios, Memphis, Tennessee; Omni Sound Studios, Dugout Studio and Javelina Studios, Nashville, Tennessee; Unique Recording Studios, New York City
- Genre: Hard rock; AOR
- Length: 58:08
- Label: Epic; EK 48509
- Producer: Terry Thomas

Giant chronology
| Last of the Runaways (1989) | Time to Burn (1992) | III (2001) |

Professional ratings
Review scores
| Source | Rating |
|---|---|
| AllMusic | 3.5/5 stars |

Time to Burn is the second studio album by American hard rock band Giant, released on March 31, 1992, by Epic Records.

Vocalist/guitarist Dann Huff had proven his guitar-playing chops as a studio musician on hit albums and singles across the popular music spectrum throughout the 1980s before starting a band with brother David on drums, Mike Brignardello on bass and Alan Pasqua on keyboards and scoring a hit of their own with "I'll See You In My Dreams" in 1989-1990. For the follow-up the band was joined in the writing process on two songs by Jim Vallance and on four by Van Stephenson, the latter of whom also guested on background vocals in the studio. Huff had previously done guitar work on Stephenson's solo albums. It was produced by Terry Thomas, a former member of the band Charlie who had previously produced albums for such rock notables as Bad Company and Foreigner.

The album's most successful single was "Chained", which peaked at No. 16 on the Billboard Mainstream Rock Tracks chart, although the second single "Stay" received some airplay as well.

== Track listing ==
1. "Thunder and Lightning" (Dann Huff, Van Stephenson) - 4:23
2. "Chained" (Huff, Alan Pasqua, Michael Brignardello) - 7:19
3. "Lay It on the Line" (Huff, Brignardello) - 5:22
4. "Stay" (Huff, Pasqua, Stephenson) - 4:46
5. "Lost in Paradise" (Pasqua, Stephenson) - 5:11
6. "Smoulder" (instrumental) (Huff) - 0:29
7. "Time to Burn" (Huff, Pasqua, Brignardello) - 4:49
8. "I'll Be There (When It's Over)" (Huff, Terry Thomas, Jim Vallance) - 4:29
9. "Save Me Tonight" (Huff, Pasqua, Brignardello, Todd Cerney) - 6:00
10. "Without You" (Huff, Brignardello, Vallance) - 4:26
11. "Now Until Forever" (Huff, Robert White Johnson) - 5:44
12. "Get Used to It" (Huff, Phil Naish, Stephenson) - 4:50

== Personnel ==
Band members

- Dann Huff – vocals, guitars and keyboards
- Alan Pasqua – keyboards and backing vocals
- Mike Brignardello – bass guitar and backing vocals
- David Huff – drums, percussion and backing vocals

Additional musicians

- Robert Johnson, Van Stephenson, Terry Thomas, Anthony Zecco – backing vocals

== Production ==
- Mixing – Terry Thomas and Rafe McKenna
- Engineer – Andrew Scarth, Patrick Kelly and Anthony Zecco (Dugout Studios)
- Recorded at: Kiva Recording Studio, Omni Sound Studio, Javelina Studio, Dugout Studio & Unique Recording Studio
