= Za-Za =

Studio album by BulletBoys
- Released: 1993
- Genre: Hard rock
- Length: 36:40
- Label: Warner Bros.
- Producer: Ted Templeman

BulletBoys chronology
Freakshow (1991)	Za-Za (1993)	Acid Monkey (1995)

Singles from Za-Za
- 1. "Mine" Released: 1993; 2. "Laughing with the Dead" Released: 1993

Professional ratings
Review scores
Source	Rating
AllMusic	2.5/5 stars

Za-Za is the third studio album by American rock band BulletBoys, released in 1993. It was their last album released by Warner Bros. Records, and the final one produced by Ted Templeman.

== Track listing ==
All tracks are written by the BulletBoys.

No.	Title	Length
1.	"When Pigs Fly"	3:59
2.	"Slow and Easy"	2:11
3.	"The Rising"	2:09
4.	"Sing a Song"	3:48
5.	"Mine"	4:08
6.	"1-800-Goodbye"	3:26
7.	"The Show"	3:02
8.	"For the Damned"	4:12
9.	"Laughing with the Dead"	3:12
10.	"Fess"	3:05
11.	"Crosstop"	3:21

== Personnel ==
- Marq Torien – lead vocals
- Mick Sweda – guitar, backing vocals
- Lonnie Vencent – bass, backing vocals
- Jimmy D'Anda – drums, percussion, backing vocals
