= Elefante (album) =

Studio album by BulletBoys
- Released: June 9, 2015
- Genre: Hard rock
- Label: Cleopatra; Deadline

BulletBoys chronology
Rocked and Ripped (2011)	Elefante (2015)	From Out of the Skies (2018)

Elefante is the eighth studio album by the American rock band BulletBoys. The album was released June 9, 2015, on Cleopatra Records. A music video was made for the track "Rollover".

== Reception ==
Professional ratings
Review scores
Source	Rating
Metal-Temple.com	10/10 stars

Jeff Legg of Metal-Temple.com deemed the album a "masterpiece", giving it a perfect 10/10 rating.

== Track listing ==
Track listing adopted from Discogs. Note: Tracks 10 and 11 were pressed the wrong way around.

No.	Title	Length
1.	"Rollover"	3:08
2.	"Tsunami"	4:15
3.	"Symphony"	3:33
4.	"The Villain"	3:16
5.	"Kin Folk"	4:00
6.	"Saving You From Me"	3:32
7.	"As Dumb As"	4:34
8.	"Superhuman Girl"	4:02
9.	"Drop Your Weapon"	4:16
10.	"The Bitch Is Back"	4:01
11.	"Elefante"	1:47

== Personnel ==
- Marq Torien – vocals, lead guitar
- Nick Rozz – guitar
- Chad MacDonald – bass
- Shawn Duncan – drums
