= BulletBoys =

American hard rock band

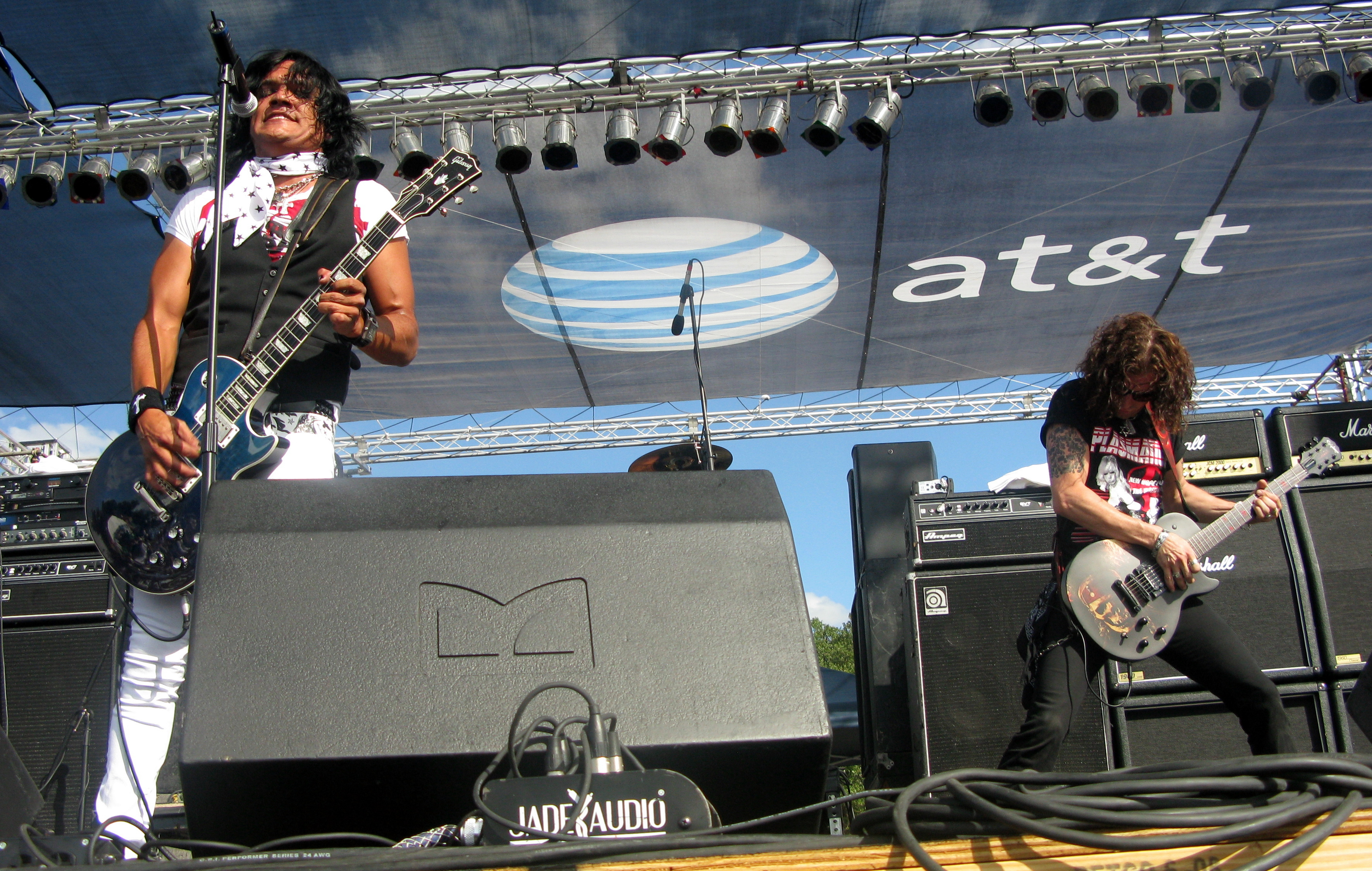
- BulletBoys performing in 2008; group leader Marq Torien at left

Background information
- Origin: Los Angeles, California, U.S.
- Genres: Hard rock, glam metal
- Years active: 1987–1995, 1998–present
- Labels: Warner Bros.; Wounded Bird; Swordholio; Perris; Crash Music; Cleopatra; Deadline; Chavis
- Members: Marq Torien; Lonnie Vencent; Mick Sweda; Jimmy D'Anda
- Past members: See List of former members

BulletBoys is an American hard rock/glam metal band formed in Los Angeles in 1987. The group's original lineup was composed of singer Marq Torien (formerly of Ratt, King Kobra, and Kagny & the Dirty Rats), guitarist Mick Sweda (formerly of King Kobra), bassist Lonnie Vencent (formerly of King Kobra), and drummer Jimmy D'Anda. The group released two successful albums and had a number of singles featured on MTV between 1988 and 1991. From the 1990s onward, the group went through numerous lineup changes, with Torien as the only consistent member. Their most recent album From Out of the Skies was released in 2018. The original lineup reunited for one-off shows in 2011 and 2019.

The group were strongly influenced by AC/DC and Van Halen, with Torien drawing comparisons to Van Halen singer David Lee Roth.

== History ==
Platinum-selling artists BulletBoys were formed in 1987 in Los Angeles, California, by former King Kobra members Marq Torien (also formerly of Ratt) on vocals, Mick Sweda on guitar, Lonnie Vencent on bass and Jimmy D'Anda on drums. After signing a deal with Warner Bros., the group released their debut album BulletBoys in 1988 with the album peaking at number 34 on the Billboard 200. The group released two singles, a cover of the classic O'Jays tune, "For the Love of Money" (which peaked at number 30 on the Mainstream Rock Chart and number 78 on the Billboard Hot 100), and "Smooth Up in Ya" (which peaked at number 23 on the Mainstream Rock Chart and number 71 on the Billboard Hot 100), with both receiving airplay on MTV. They released their second album, Freakshow, in 1991; however, the album only peaked at number 69 on the Billboard 200. The single "Hang On St. Christopher", a cover of the Tom Waits song, peaked at number 22 on the Mainstream Rock Chart. The group released their final album with Warner Bros., titled Za-Za, a name suggested by D'Anda taken from The Godfather Part III character Joey Zasa, in 1993, but it failed to chart, as well as the album's singles. Both Sweda and D'Anda left the group the same year. The group continued and released Acid Monkey in 1995 through Swordholio/Perris Records however they disbanded soon after.

In 1998, the group reformed, with Torien and Vencent adding former Guns N' Roses drummer Steven Adler and future Guns N' Roses guitarist DJ Ashba briefly, with a tour of the US planned with Faster Pussycat, Bang Tango and Enuff Z'nuff. In 1999, Ashba left the group to form Beautiful Creatures with Bang Tango singer Joe Lesté while Adler left also sometime after, going on to form Adler's Appetite in 2003. A compilation album, titled Burning Cats and Amputees, was released in 2000, through Deadline Records.

In 2002, Vencent was rumored to be involved in a tour of Europe with former Anthrax members Joey Belladonna, Dan Spitz and former W.A.S.P. drummer Stet Howland while former drummer Jimmy D'Anda formed the group Zen Lunatic with John Corabi (formerly of The Scream and Mötley Crüe) and Stevo Bruno (formerly of Revel 8). D'Anda went on to tour with George Lynch as part of Lynch Mob and opening up for Dio around the states during 2001. In 2009, D'Anda played drums for former Warrant singer Jani Lane doing shows in California, New Mexico and Nevada. In September 2010, Jimmy performed at the Groove Remains the Same, a tribute to John Bonham.

The BulletBoys cover of The O'Jay's R&B song from 1973 entitled "For the Love of Money" appears briefly in the 2003 TV movie Behind the Camera: The Unauthorized Story of 'Three's Company'.

Remaining members Torien and Vencent, released the group's fifth album (their first in seven years), titled Sophie, in 2003 which featured a guest appearance by former Skid Row singer Sebastian Bach. A tour was to follow, with L.A. Guns, however this was soon canceled after an incident with the group's bus driver. Guitarist Keri Kelli, who was filling for Tracii Guns in L.A. Guns, performed with BulletBoys before leaving at the insistence of L.A. Guns drummer Steve Riley. Jason Hook was briefly a member of BulletBoys during this time. In 2004, Torien was in line to tour with Stephen Pearcy (formerly of Ratt), Joey Belladonna (formerly of Anthrax), Ron Keel (Keel, IronHorse) and Jason McMaster (Dangerous Toys, Watchtower) as part of the "Bastards of Metal" tour. However, this tour never came to pass.

In January 2006, the group was announced as support, along with Bang Tango, to Stephen Pearcy on his tour, however they soon pulled out while they performed at the Raven's Heart benefit concert, which featured members of Guns N' Roses, Queens of the Stone Age and Dio among others performing also. Torien also announced that BulletBoys were to reunite and record a new album stating:

"In 2006 there will be a BulletBoys reunion and I wanted to let you know that on your show. The powers that be are working on it right now, so you will be seeing the BulletBoys out there. But, I wanted to let everyone out there know that we will be coming back out and that we are coming back out for our fans as well as for rock 'n' roll. But I don't really feel that I should be out there touring if I don't have anything new to offer to the musical community like a new fresh record. So that will be happening. A new BulletBoys record will be coming out this year. It's time to go at it and it's time to get it back together again..."

Drummer Jimmy D'Anda stated that none of the original members were involved in the reunion album soon after, while Torien stated that only D'Anda was "resistant to the idea" with the other former members (Sweda and Vincent) willing to return. However, a reunion failed to materialize. BulletBoys went on to tour with the Tracii Guns-led L.A. Guns and announced plans for a live album as well as an album of new material in 2007. The group released the live album, titled Behind the Orange Curtain, on April 3, 2007, through Crash Music while they were one of the confirmed acts for Rocklahoma in July of the same year. Also in 2006, the song "Hard as a Rock" appeared briefly in the movie Beerfest.

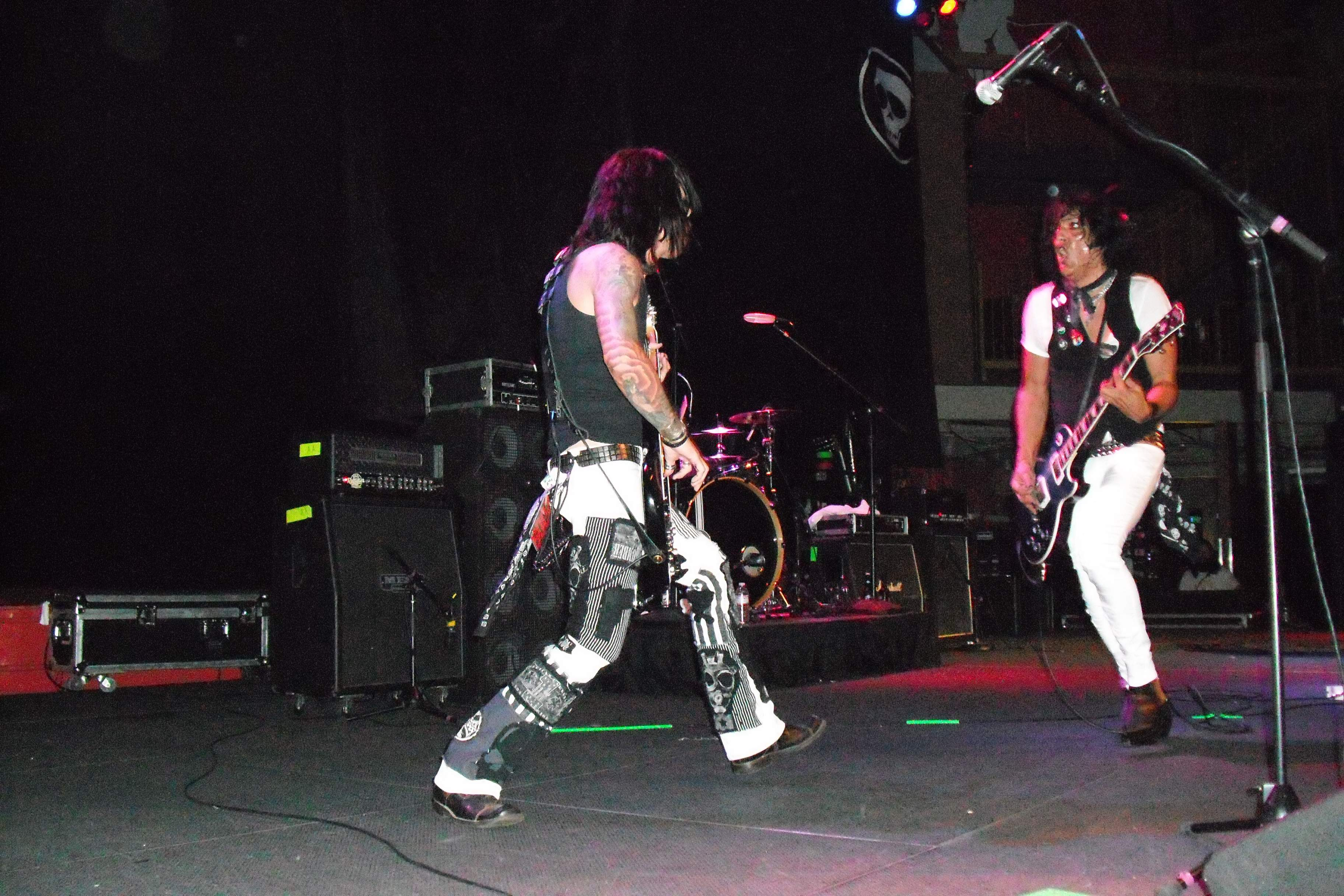
The band performing in 2009

In 2009, they released their sixth album, titled 10c Billionaire, on Chavis Records. The material was originally written in 2006 with plans, by Torien, for a new project using the same name. However, they eventually released it under the BulletBoys moniker. In October, original bassist Lonnie Vincent returned to the group while guitarist Tony Marcus (XYZ, Arcade, Vicious Delite) was also added to the lineup with a tour of the US announced soon after.

In January 2010, the group was confirmed to play the Stockholm Rock Out Festival on April 30 of the same year. In March, the song "Smooth Up In Ya" appeared briefly in the movie Hot Tub Time Machine. In April, they were confirmed to play another Festival, Rock N America, that took place July 23–25.

On August 28, 2011, former drummer Johnny Giosa died in a car accident in Los Angeles at the age of 42.

On December 12, 2019, BulletBoys announced that their original lineup would be reuniting. The reunion kicked off with a hometown gig on December 30, 2019, at the Whisky a Go Go. The reunion lasted until January 2022 when drummer Jimmy D'Anda and guitarist Mick Sweda left the band due to "toxicity" within the band. The newest lineup of the band was announced shortly after, which would consist of guitarist Ira Black, bassist Brad Lang, and drummer Fred Aching, thus alleging original bassist Lonnie Vencent had also left the band.

On December 10, 2024, it was announced that original bassist Lonnie Vencent had returned to the band to replace Brad Lang, and Jake Faun had joined the band to replace Ira Black. On October 13, 2025, it was announced original drummer Jimmy D'Anda had rejoined the band, and that guitarist Frankie Lindia had joined the band to replace Jake Faun, while D'Anda stating that original guitarist Mick Sweda had no desire to return to the band. However, two months later, it was announced Mick Sweda had rejoined the band, reestablishing another reunion of the band's classic lineup.

== Musical style and influences ==
According to AllMusic, BulletBoys' style was heavily influenced by AC/DC and Van Halen, before later taking a bluesier direction. Vocalist Marq Torien has been compared to Van Halen frontman David Lee Roth. In his review of the debut album, Oliver Klemm (Metal Hammer) also highlighted the similarity to AC/DC, which he considered striking. An example of Van Halen similarity on the debut album is the track "Crank Me Up". According to Markus Baro (Break Out), passages of the follow-up album Freakshow also sound like Van Halen's Fair Warning. In his book HAIRcyclopedia Vol. 1 – The Legends, Taylor T. Carlson said BulletBoys were "unfairly" described as Van Halen clones. Werner Theurich, on the other hand, considers BulletBoys "quite rightly reviled as Van Halen clones".

The band compared themselves to early Montrose and Van Halen, but more in terms of attitude than music. However, the debut albums of both bands were the sonic model for the production, which is why Ted Templeman was chosen. The blues was added because it increased the chances of being played on the radio.

== Personnel ==
=== Current members ===
- Marq Torien – lead vocals, rhythm guitar, congas (1987–present)
- Lonnie Vencent – bass, backing vocals (1987–2000, 2006, 2009–2014, 2019–2022, 2024–present)
- Mick Sweda – lead guitar, backing vocals (1987–1993, 1999–2000, 2011, 2019–2022, 2025–present)
- Jimmy D'Anda – drums, backing vocals (1987–1993, 1999–2000, 2011, 2019–2022, 2025–present)

=== Former members ===
- Tommy Pittam – lead guitar (1993–1998)
- Robby Karras – drums (1993–1998) (died 2012)
- Tony Marcus – lead guitar (1993, 2009–2010)
- DJ Ashba – lead guitar (1998–1999)
- Steven Adler – drums (1998–1999)
- Jason Hook – lead guitar (2000–2002)
- Brent Fitz – drums (2000–2001)
- Vikki Foxx – drums (2000)
- Scott Taylor – bass (2002–2006)
- Keri Kelli – lead guitar (2002–2004)
- Ryche Green – drums (2005–2010, 2012–2013)
- Michael Thomas – lead guitar (2006, 2007–2008)
- Scott Griffin – bass (2007)
- Don "Dish" Bish – drums (2007)
- Rob Lane – bass (2008–2009)
- Tory Stoffregen – lead guitar (2009)
- Nick Rozz – guitars (2010–2011, 2012–2019)
- Troy Patrick Farrell – drums (2010–2011)
- Johnny Giosa – drums (2010) (died 2011)
- Chad MacDonald – bass, backing vocals (2011, 2014–2019)
- Stephen Jude Mills – drums (2012–2014, 2015, 2019)
- Shawn Duncan – drums (2014–2016, 2019)
- Joaquin Revuelta – drums (2016–2018)
- Phil Varone – drums (2018)
- Anthony "Tiny" Biuso – drums (2018–2019)
- Ira Black – lead guitar (2022–2024)
- Brad Lang – bass (2022–2024)
- Fred Aching – drums (2022–2025)
- Jake Faun – lead guitar (2024–2025)
- Frankie Lindia – lead guitar (2025)

== Discography ==
=== Studio albums ===
- BulletBoys (1988)
- Freakshow (1991)
- Za-Za (1993)
- Acid Monkey (1995)
- Sophie (2003)
- 10¢ Billionaire (2009)
- Rocked and Ripped (2011)
- Elefante' (2015)
- From Out of the Skies (2018)

=== Live albums ===
- Behind the Orange Curtain (2007)

=== Compilation albums ===
- Burning Cats and Amputees (2000)
- Smooth Up in Ya: The Best of the Bulletboys (2006)

=== Box sets ===
- The Warner Albums 1988–1993 (2021)

=== Singles ===
Title	Release	Peak chart positions	
Title	Release	US	US Main
"Smooth Up in Ya"	1989	71	23
"For the Love of Money"	1989	78	30
"Hang On St. Christopher"	1990	—	22
"THC Groove"	1990	—	—
"Talk to Your Daughter"	1991	—	—
"Mine"	1993	—	—
"Laughing with the Dead"	1993	—	—
"Balls to the Wall"	2009	—	—
"Road to Nowhere"	2009	—	—
"Symphony"	2014	—	—
"D-Evil"	2018	—	—
"Holy Fuck"	2022	—	—
"—" denotes a recording that did not chart.
