= Acid Monkey =

Studio album by BulletBoys
- Released: 1995
- Recorded: 1995
- Genre: Alternative rock, hard rock
- Length: 31:38
- Label: Swordholio

BulletBoys chronology
Za-Za (1993)	Acid Monkey (1995)	Burning Cats and Amputees (2000)

Professional ratings
Review scores
Source	Rating
AllMusic	2.5/5 stars

Acid Monkey is the fourth album by the American rock band BulletBoys, released in 1995 on Swordholio Records. The album marks a change in direction and style after the breakup of the band in 1993, featuring more of an alternative rock and pop punk influence, with singer Marq Torien and bassist Lonnie Vencent continuing to release albums under the BulletBoys name. Torien and Vencent were joined by guitarist Tommy Pittam and drummer Robby Karras for this album.

== Reception ==
AllMusic rated the album 2 and a half stars out of 5, but no review is written.

== Track listing ==
All tracks are written by BulletBoys, except American Pie, which was written by Don McLean

No.	Title	Writer(s)	Length
1.	"Weazel"		2:29
2.	"Surf Dog"		2:50
3.	"Diss"		4:30
4.	"Thorn"		5:11
5.	"Alien"		3:56
6.	"Toy"		3:20
7.	"Terror Ride"		4:57
8.	"A.P." (cover of "American Pie")	Don McLean	4:25
Total length:			31:38

== Personnel ==
- Marq Torien: vocals
- Tommy Pittam: guitar
- Lonnie Vencent: bass
- Robby Karras: drums
