= From Out of the Skies =

Studio album by BulletBoys
- Released: March 23, 2018
- Recorded: Studio 606, Northridge, California
- Genre: Hard rock
- Label: Frontiers
- Producers: Marq Torien, Luke Tierny, Rick Parker

BulletBoys chronology
Elefante (2015)	From Out of the Skies (2018)

From Out of the Skies is the ninth studio album by the American hard rock band BulletBoys. The album was released March 23, 2018 on Frontiers Records. The track "D-Evil" features a guest appearance by Jesse Hughes from Eagles of Death Metal. The album was recorded at Dave Grohl's Studio 606 in Northridge, California.

== Reception ==
Vito Tanzi of Cryptic Rock rated the album 3 out of 5 stars. Marcos "Big Daddy" Garcia of Metal-Temple.com called the album "excellent", rating it an 8/10.

Professional ratings
Review scores
Source	Rating
Cryptic Rock	3/5 stars
Metal Temple	8/10 stars

== Track listing ==
The track listing was adopted from iTunes. All songs written and composed by Marq Torien unless noted.

No.	Title	Writer(s)	Length
1.	"Apocalyptico"		3:42
2.	"D-Evil"		3:13
3.	"From out of the Skies"		4:09
4.	"Hi-Fi Drive By"		3:57
5.	"Losing End Again"		4:10
6.	"What Cha Don't"		5:00
7.	"P.R.A.B."		4:06
8.	"Sucker Punch"		3:56
9.	"Switchblade Butterfly"		3:18
10.	"Once Upon a Time"	Marq Torien, Johnny Matthew Coppolino	4:29
