= Thrill of a Lifetime (album) =

Studio album by King Kobra
- Released: 1986
- Studios: American Recording Company, Woodland Hills, California; Pasha Music House Hollywood, California
- Genre: Hard rock
- Length: 40:42
- Label: Capitol
- Producers: Carmine Appice, Duane Hitchings and Spencer Proffer

King Kobra chronology
Ready to Strike (1985)	Thrill of a Lifetime (1986)	King Kobra III (1988)

Singles from Thrill of a Lifetime
- 1. "Iron Eagle (Never Say Die)" Released: 1986; 2. "Home Street Home" / "Raise Your Hands to Rock" Released: 1986; 3. "Dream On" Released: 1986

Professional ratings
Review scores
Source	Rating
Allmusic	(mediocre)

Thrill of a Lifetime is the second album (and the last to feature Mark Free on vocals) by the American hard rock band King Kobra, released in 1986 by Capitol Records. The album features "Iron Eagle (Never Say Die)", the theme song of the 1986 film Iron Eagle. The music video of the song features Louis Gossett Jr. as Charles "Chappy" Sinclair from the film as the band members (dropping their glam rock looks) going through vigorous boot camp training.

== Track listing ==
All tracks by King Kobra, except where indicated

1. "Second Time Around" - 4:08
2. "Dream On" (Russ Ballard) - 4:29
3. "Feel the Heat" (King Kobra, Scott St. Clair Sheets) - 3:58
4. "Thrill of a Lifetime" - 4:12
5. "Only the Strong Will Survive" (King Kobra, St. Clair Sheets) - 4:00
6. "Iron Eagle (Never Say Die)" (Duane Hitchings, Jake Hooker) - 3:32
7. "Home Street Home" - 4:20
8. "Overnight Sensation" - 4:19
9. "Raise Your Hands to Rock" - 3:47
10. "Party Animal" - 3:57

== Personnel ==
Production and performance credits are adapted from the album liner notes.

=== King Kobra ===
- Mark Free – lead vocals, backing vocals
- David Michael-Philips – lead and rhythm guitars, guitar synthesizer and backing vocals
- Mick Sweda – lead and rhythm guitars, guitar synthesizer and backing vocals
- Johnny Rod – bass guitar, backing vocals
- Carmine Appice – drums, electric and acoustic percussion, backing vocals

=== Additional musicians ===
- Duane Hitchings – keyboards

=== Production ===
- Mixed at Pasha Music House, North Hollywood, California
- Produced by Carmine Appice and Duane Hitchings with Spencer Proffer for Pasha
- Arranged by King Kobra & Duane Hitchings
- Jake Hooker – production on "Iron Eagle (Never Say Die)"
- Ritchie Podolor – mixing on "Iron Eagle (Never Say Die)"
- Bill Cooper – engineer, mixing on "Iron Eagle (Never Say Die)"
- Hanspeter Huber – engineer
- Spencer Proffer, Alex Woltman – additional engineering
- Steve Hall – mastering at Future Disc, Hollywood, California
- Ted Raess – art direction and design for Raess Design
- King Kobra, Alan Miller – cover concept
- Von Thomas – photography
- Digital Art – computer graphics
- Carol Peters – coordination for Pasha
- Ray Tusken – A&R coordination
- Alan Miller – management for Miller Management
