= Freakshow (BulletBoys album) =

Studio album by BulletBoys
- Released: March 12, 1991
- Recorded: 1991
- Genres: Hard rock, glam metal
- Label: Warner Bros.
- Producer: Ted Templeman

BulletBoys chronology
BulletBoys (1988)	Freakshow (1991)	Za-Za (1993)

Singles from Freakshow
- 1. "THC Groove" Released: 1991; 2. "Hang On St. Christopher" Released: 1991; 3. "Talk to Your Daughter" Released: 1991

Alternative cover
- The cover sleeve seen on different releases

Professional ratings
Review scores
Source	Rating
AllMusic	3/5 stars
Chicago Tribune	3/4 stars
The Encyclopedia of Popular Music	3/5 stars
Entertainment Weekly	C+
MusicHound Rock: The Essential Album Guide	2/5 stars
The Rolling Stone Album Guide	2.5/5 stars

Freakshow is the second album by American rock band BulletBoys. It was released in 1991 by Warner Bros. Records. It is the follow-up to their successful self-titled debut.

The album peaked at Number 69 on the Billboard 200. Their cover of Tom Waits's "Hang On St. Christopher" reached 22 on the Mainstream Rock chart. Videos were made for "THC Groove", "Hang On St. Christopher", and "Talk to Your Daughter".

In 2005, Wounded Bird Records re-released the album along with the follow-up, Za-Za, on a single disc.

== Critical reception ==
Entertainment Weekly thought that "the problem is that all [the band's] charm has no foundation to stand on; there are no hooks or memorable melodies here." The Chicago Tribune wrote: "Their cover of Tom Waits' 'Hang On St. Christopher' might make a few cringe-but then again, why would a Waits fan be listening to these guys?"

== Track listing ==
All tracks are written by the BulletBoys, unless otherwise noted.

No.	Title	Length
1.	"Hell Yeah!"	3:24
2.	"THC Groove"	3:42
3.	"Thrill That Kills"	3:10
4.	"Hang On St. Christopher" (Tom Waits cover)	3:56
5.	"Talk To Your Daughter" (J.B. Lenoir cover)	3:35
6.	"Freakshow"	4:28
7.	"Goodgirl"	3:27
8.	"Do Me Raw"	3:11
9.	"Ripping Me"	2:56
10.	"Say Your Prayers"	3:15
11.	"O Me O My"	3:00
12.	"Huge"	3:05

=== Additional track listings ===
Some versions have a very different track listing, which reads as follows:

Additional versions
No.	Title	Length
1.	"Hang On St. Christopher" (Tom Waits cover)	3:56
2.	"Do Me Raw"	3:11
3.	"Thrill That Kills"	3:10
4.	"Ripping Me"	2:56
5.	"Say Your Prayers"	3:15
6.	"Hell Yeah!"	3:24
7.	"THC Groove"	3:42
8.	"O Me O My"	3:00
9.	"Freakshow"	4:28
10.	"Huge"	3:05
11.	"Goodgirl"	3:27
12.	"Talk To Your Daughter" (J.B. Lenoir cover)	3:35

== Singles ==
Promotional singles and videos were released for the songs "THC Groove", "Hang On St. Christopher", and "Talk To Your Daughter". Their cover of Tom Waits' "Hang On St. Christopher" would go on to peak at Number 22 on the US Mainstream Rock Chart in 1991.

== Personnel ==
Band members

- Marq Torien: Lead Vocals
- Mick Sweda: Guitar
- Lonnie Vencent: Bass
- Jimmy D'Anda: Drums
- Bobby LaKind: Congas on "Hang On St. Christopher"
- Art Direction and Design: Kim Champagne
- Cover Painting: David B. McMacken

== Charts ==
Chart (1991)	Peak position
US Billboard 200	69
