= King Kobra =

American heavy metal band

- Origin: Los Angeles, California, U.S.
- Genres: Heavy metal, glam metal
- Years active: 1983–1989; 2000–2001; 2010–present
- Labels: Capitol, New Renaissance, Frontiers
- Members: Carmine Appice; Johnny Rod; Paul Shortino; Carlos Cavazo; Rowan Robertson
- Past members: Marcie Free; Mick Sweda; Johnny Edwards; David Michael-Philips; Jeff Northrup; Larry Hart; Kelly Keeling; Steve Fister

King Kobra is an American heavy metal band founded by drummer Carmine Appice after his tenure with Ozzy Osbourne from 1983 to 1984.

== History ==
For their first two albums, the band consisted of Appice with four relatively unknown musicians: vocalist Mark Free, guitarist David Michael-Philips, guitarist Mick Sweda, and bassist Johnny Rod. After two albums on Capitol Records—Ready to Strike (November 9, 1985) and Thrill of a Lifetime (1986)—and the independent release King Kobra III in 1988, Appice decided to dissolve the band and join guitarist John Sykes for his Blue Murder project in 1989.

A new King Kobra emerged in 2010 with Carmine Appice on drums, Paul Shortino taking over vocal duties, Mick Sweda on guitar, David Henzerling (a.k.a. David Michael-Philips) on guitar, and Johnny Rod on bass. This lineup released the self-titled album King Kobra in 2011 on Frontiers Records and another album in 2013, titled King Kobra II.

The band went on hiatus following the release of their 2013 album, largely due to the other commitments of the individual band members, They played live gigs again in 2016 without Mick Sweda.

On July 18, 2023, the band announced their new album, We Are Warriors, will be released on August 11. The title track was also released as a single. The line up features new guitarists Carlos Cavazo and Rowan Robertson, formerly of Quiet Riot and Dio respectively.

Original King Kobra vocalist Marcie Free experienced alcoholism but became sober around 2008, crediting her "close personal relationship with God" for her sobriety; she died on October 23, 2025 at age 71.

== Band members ==
=== Current ===
- Carmine Appice – drums, backing vocals (1983–1989, 2000–2001, 2010–present)
- Johnny Rod – bass, backing vocals (1983–1986, 2010–present)
- Paul Shortino – lead vocals, guitar (2010–present)
- Carlos Cavazo – guitar (2021–present)
- Rowan Robertson – guitar (2021–present)

=== Former ===
- David Michael-Phillips – guitar, backing vocals, keyboards, synthesizers (1983–1989, 2010–2021)
- Marcie Free – lead vocals (1983–1986, died 2025)
- Mike Wolf – guitar (1983)
- Mick Sweda – guitar, backing vocals, synthesizers (1983–1987, 2000–2001, 2010–2016)
- Lonnie Vencent – bass (1986–1987)
- Larry Hart – bass (1987–1989)
- Jeff Northrup – guitar, backing vocals (1987–1989)
- Johnny Edwards – lead vocals (1987–1989)
- Marq Torien – lead vocals (1987)
- Kelly Keeling – bass, lead vocals, guitars, keyboards (2000–2001)
- Steve Fister – guitar (2000–2001)

== Discography ==
=== Studio albums ===
- Ready to Strike (1985)
- Thrill of a Lifetime (1986)
- King Kobra III (1988)
- King Kobra (2011)
- King Kobra II (2013)
- We Are Warriors (2023)

=== Compilation albums ===
- The Lost Years (1999)
- Hollywood Trash (2001)
- Number One (2005 - Re-release of The Lost Years)

=== Soundtrack appearances ===
- "Iron Eagle (Never Say Die)" was included in the soundtrack album from the movie Iron Eagle (1986).
  - Song credits: Jake Hooker-Duane Hitchings - 1986 - Capitol Records.
- "Hunger", covered by King Kobra but written by Kick Axe (listed as "Spectre General"), was featured in The Transformers: The Movie (1986), and included on the soundtrack album.
- "Mean Street Machine" and "Redline", were featured in the video game RoadKill (2003) on the radio station 69.3 QQQQ.

=== Music videos ===
- "Hunger" (1985)
- "Breakin' Out" (1985)
- "Iron Eagle (Never Say Die)" (1986)
- "Take It Off" (1988)
- "Turn Up The Good (Times)" (2011)
- "Have a Good Time" (2013)
- "We Are Warriors" (2023)

== Notes ==
- Rod departed from the band and joined W.A.S.P. in 1986.
- Torien, Sweda, and Vincent left to play together in the band BulletBoys.
- Free went onto form the bands known as Signal (EMI Records), and Unruly Child (Atlantic/Interscope Records). After coming to terms with her gender dysphoria in 1993 she was known as Marcie Free.
