= 10¢ Billionaire =

Studio album by BulletBoys
- Released: 2009
- Genre: Hard rock
- Label: Chavis Records
- Producer: Brent Woods

BulletBoys chronology
Behind the Orange Curtain (2007)	10¢ Billionaire (2009)	Rocked and Ripped (2011)

Professional ratings
Review scores
Source	Rating
AllMusic	2.5/5 stars

10¢ Billionaire is the sixth album released by the American rock band BulletBoys. It was released in the summer of 2009 on Chavis Records. The album was produced by Brent Woods and written by Marq Torien. It received limited amount of promotion as the record company ceased trading.

== Reception ==
Writing for AllMusic, Greg Prato wrote that the album "is arguably BulletBoys heaviest release yet", and gave the album 2 and 1/2 out of 5 stars.

== Track listing ==
1. Asteroid
2. Blessed by Your Touch
3. Born to Breed
4. Bringing Home the Gun
5. Girls Kissin' Girls
6. Jenna Star
7. Road to Nowhere
8. Save the World
9. Wasted
10. Witness
11. Road to Nowhere (radio remix)

== Personnel ==
- Marq Torien – vocals, guitar
- Ryche Green – drums
- Nick Rozz – guitar
- Rob Lane – bass
