= Marcie Free =

American rock singer (1954–2025)

Background information
- Born: April 12, 1954; South Bend, Indiana, U.S.
- Died: October 23, 2025 (aged 71)
- Genres: Glam metal; heavy metal; hard rock; AOR
- Occupation: Singer
- Years active: 1973–1995; 2009–2025
- Labels: Now & Then; Frontiers
- Formerly of: King Kobra; Signal; Unruly Child

Marcie Michelle Free (born Mark Edward Free; April 12, 1954 – October 23, 2025) was an American rock singer, best known as the lead singer of King Kobra, Signal and Unruly Child.

== History ==
=== Early career, King Kobra and Signal (1973–1989) ===
Free started singing professionally at the age of 19 while living in Flint, Michigan. In 1975, Free moved to Las Vegas, which eventually led to her relocating to Los Angeles in 1979.

Free met Carmine Appice in 1983, shortly before Appice was fired from Ozzy Osbourne's backing band. Appice recruited her to be the vocalist for his new project, King Kobra; while King Kobra was initially intended to be a solo project, Appice eventually decided to recruit two guitarists and a bassist to build a full band. The band was signed to Capitol Records in 1984. Free recorded two albums with King Kobra, Ready to Strike and Thrill of a Lifetime, before leaving King Kobra in November 1986 to pursue other musical interests.

In 1987, producer Peter McIan began to form a solo project called The Fugitive Kind with help from Erik Scott, a keyboardist, bassist and producer, as well as Mark Baker, a songwriter. The group also recruited drummer Jan Uvena. Free joined the group later, after which Ron Fair, then a new senior A&R representative at EMI Records, renamed the group Signal. Prior to the adoption of the name Signal, Free unsuccessfully proposed several alternate names for the group, one of which was Unruly Child, which she would use for a later group. Signal released one album on EMI, Loud and Clear, in 1989. The album featured several outside songwriters, and Free did not have much involvement in the songwriting on Loud and Clear. Signal was short-lived, as shortly after the band released their only album, EMI executives dropped Signal from the label and did not spend any money to promote the album after its release. Free left Signal in October 1990, and the band broke up shortly afterwards.

=== Unruly Child and solo career (1990–1995) ===
In 1990, Free joined up with guitarist Bruce Gowdy and keyboardist Guy Allison, forming the group Unruly Child. Unruly Child signed with Atlantic/Interscope Records in 1991 and released their self-titled debut album in 1992. In 1993, Free sang the theme song, "(To Be) The Best of the Best", for the action film Best of the Best II. Also in 1993, a solo album consisting of demos Free had sung for a mother/daughter songwriting duo named Judithe and Robin Randall was released on Now & Then Records, an independent label in the United Kingdom. The album, entitled Long Way from Love, was re-released on Frontiers Records in 1998. This album version included some of the live performances Free gave while in Manchester, England, for the first rock festival known as "The Gods of AOR" in October 1993.

Shortly after the release of Long Way from Love, Unruly Child, having lost their record deal with Atlantic/Interscope, reformed under the moniker Twelve Pound Sledge. They were writing new material in hopes of re-signing with another American label. That never happened, though songs from these sessions were later released in 1995, as a solo album Free released on independent labels in Germany and Japan, entitled Tormented.

=== Unruly Child reunion (2009–2025) ===
In September 2009, Free, Gowdy, and Allison reunited as Unruly Child and signed a recording contract with Frontiers Records. They released a new album, Worlds Collide, in 2010. Unruly Child released a new album in 2014 entitled Down the Rabbit Hole on the band's own label "Unruly Records".

== Personal life and death ==
On June 24, 1989, Free married Laurie Richardson. They later divorced.

Free came out as a trans woman in November 1993. Free experienced gender dysphoria prior to her transition and changed her name to Marcie Michelle Free. Free stated that prior to her transition, she struggled with self-harm ideation and that transitioning was a "[decision] between life and death," but "very rewarding," and that "[if she] would've continued [her] life as Mark [she] would have died for sure."

After Free came out as transgender, her career suffered and "[her] whole musical world quickly fell apart," and she cited her post-transition career struggles as one reason for the temporary dissolution of Unruly Child. Free also stated that people in the music industry with whom she had prior connections shunned her after her transition.

Between the breakup of Signal and the formation of Unruly Child, Free worked as a courier in Los Angeles. In 1995, Free temporarily retired from the music business and moved back to Michigan to be close to her family. Free stated that during Unruly Child's hiatus, she "[lived] life and [worked] as a normal person does every day."

Free experienced alcoholism but became sober around 2008, crediting her "close personal relationship with God" for her sobriety.

Free died on October 23, 2025, at the age of 71. No cause of death was publicly revealed.

== Artistry ==
Free cited Aretha Franklin as one of her greatest inspirations and included thanks to Franklin in the liner notes of some of her albums. Some of the artists Free grew up listening and singing to include The Four Seasons, The Beatles, The Beach Boys, Grand Funk Railroad, Three Dog Night, Smokey Robinson, and Led Zeppelin, as well as several big band artists.

== Discography ==
=== Studio albums ===
- Long Way from Love (1993)
- Tormented (1995)

=== with King Kobra ===
- Ready to Strike (1985)
- Thrill of a Lifetime (1986)

=== with Signal ===
- Loud & Clear (1989)
- Signal Live (2000)

=== with Unruly Child ===
- Unruly Child (1992)
- Tormented (1995) (as Marcie Free)
- Worlds Collide (2010)
- Down the Rabbit Hole (2014)
- Can't Go Home (2017)
- Big Blue World (2019)
- Our Glass House (2020)

=== Guest appearances ===
- David Cassidy – David Cassidy (1990)
- Desmond Child – Discipline (1991)
- Julio Iglesias – Crazy (1994)
- Bobby Kimball – Rise Up (1994)
- Venus & Mars – New Moon Rising (1998)
- Venus & Mars – Grand Trine (2009)
