= Marq Torien =

American singer and guitarist

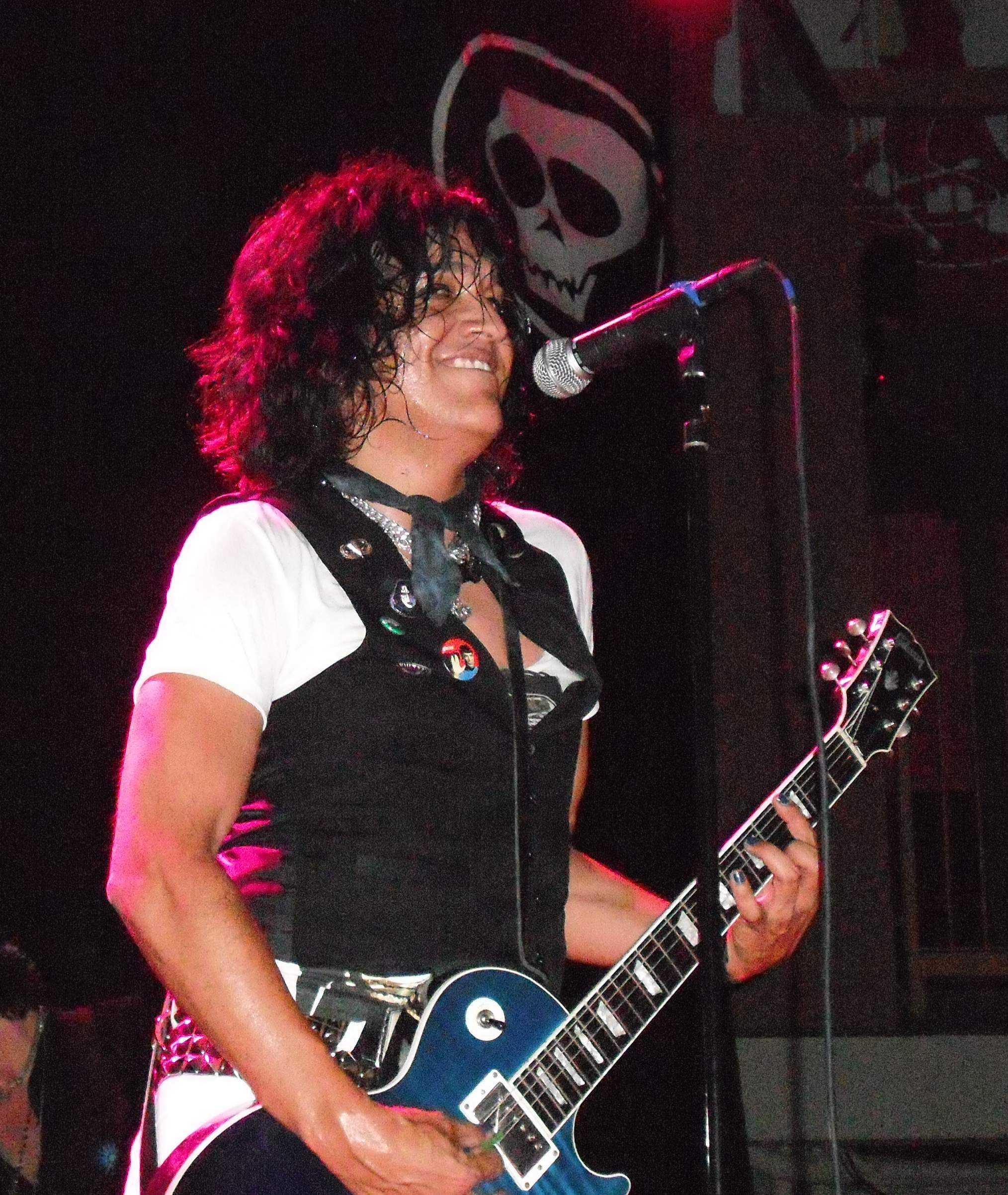
- Torien with BulletBoys in 2009

Background information
- Birth name: Mark Joseph Maytorena
- Born: September 22, 1961 (age 63); Los Angeles, California, U.S.
- Genres: Hard rock, glam metal, heavy metal
- Occupation: Musician
- Instrument(s): Vocals, guitar, congas
- Years active: 1980s–present
- Member of: BulletBoys
- Formerly of: Ratt, Hawk, King Kobra, Love/Hate

Marq Torien (born Mark Joseph Maytorena; September 22, 1961) is an American musician, best known as the lead singer of the hard rock act BulletBoys. He is the only member to have remained with the group since the release of their self-titled debut album in 1988.

== History ==
Prior to BulletBoys, Torien was a guitarist in the then-unsigned band Ratt, a guitarist for the band Hawk, a member of Motown recording artists Kagny & the Dirty Rats, a lead vocalist briefly for the band King Kobra.

In 1984, Torien formed the band Touch with multi-instrumentalist Marc Danzeisen, future Icon frontman Jerry Harrison, and future Chalk FarM bassist Orlando Sims. The group recorded a five-song demo, which was heard by Sylvester Stallone during his search for new acts to perform songs for Rocky IV. The band recorded "The Sweetest Victory" which did not appear in the film but was included on the soundtrack. The song was featured in Stallone's director's cut of the film in 2021.

In addition to periodic BulletBoys ventures, Torien's solo projects included Sexual Chocolate, Ten-Cent Billionaires, and This.

Torien added vocals on the track "Texas Lawman" from The Regulators on their 1993 self-titled album on Polygram/Polydor. Torien provided lead vocals for two tracks on Cherry St.'s second album Monroe in 1994. The tracks being "Dogtown" and "One More Tonight"

In the book Off the Rails by Rudy Sarzo, Sarzo tells a story about Torien's audition for the Ozzy Osbourne band after the death of Randy Rhoads as the group's guitarist.

== Discography ==
=== with Kagny & The Dirty Rats ===
- Kagny & the Dirty Rats (1983)

=== with Touch ===
- Rocky IV (1985)

Song: "The Sweetest Victory" (credited as Mark Torien)

=== with Bulletboys ===
- BulletBoys (1988)
- Freakshow (1991)
- Za-Za (1993)
- Acid Monkey (1995)
- Sophie (2003)
- 10¢ Billionaire (2009)
- Rocked and Ripped (2011)
- Elefante' (2015)
- From Out of the Skies (2018)

=== with King Kobra ===
- The Lost Years (1999)
