= Giant (band) =

American rock band

- Origin: Nashville, Tennessee, U.S.
- Genre: Hard rock
- Years active: 1987–1992, 2000–2002, 2009–2017, 2021–present
- Labels: A&M, Epic, Frontiers
- Members: David Huff; Mike Brignardello
- Past members: Dann Huff; Alan Pasqua; John Roth; Jeff Peterson; Mark Oakley; Larry Hall; Terry Brock; Jimmy Westerlund; Kent Hilli

Giant is an American melodic hard rock band that was formed in 1987. The band originally consisted of founding members Dann Huff (lead vocals and guitar) and Alan Pasqua (keyboard), and had Dann's brother David Huff on drums and Mike Brignardello on bass. The Huff brothers were part of the founding members of the Christian rock band White Heart.

The band scored one hit, the 1990 power ballad "I'll See You in My Dreams", written by Alan Pasqua and Mark Spiro.

Giant disbanded in the early 1990s after recording two albums, but resurfaced in 2000 minus Alan Pasqua and released the album III in late 2001.

In December 2009, Frontiers Records announced that they would release Giant's fourth studio album Promise Land in 2010. The band included Terry Brock (Strangeways, Seventh Key) on lead vocals and John Roth (Winger) on guitars. Dann Huff was not a part of the band due to his busy schedule, but he co-wrote seven songs and guested on guitar on two. The album was released on February 26, 2010, for Europe and March 9, 2010, for the US.

Giant released their first studio album in 12 years, entitled Shifting Time, on January 21, 2022. The follow-up album, Stand and Deliver, was released on May 16, 2025.

== Band members ==
=== Current ===
- David Huff – drums, backing vocals (1987–1992, 2000–2002, 2009–2017, 2021–present)
- Mike Brignardello – bass, backing vocals (1987–1992, 2000–2002, 2009–2017, 2021–present)

=== Former ===
- Dann Huff – lead vocals, guitars, keyboards (1987–1992, 2000–2002, 2017, 2026)
- Alan Pasqua – keyboards, backing vocals (1987–1992)
- Jeff Peterson – guitars, backing vocals (touring) (1987–1990)
- Mark Oakley – guitars, backing vocals (touring) (1990–1992, 2017, 2026)
- Larry Hall – keyboards, backing vocals (touring) (1992, 2026)
- John Roth - guitars, backing vocals (2009–2017, 2021–2024)
- Terry Brock – lead vocals (2009–2017)
- Kent Hilli – lead vocals (2021–2026)
- Jimmy Westerlund – guitars, backing vocals (2024–2026)

== Discography ==
=== Studio albums ===
- Last of the Runaways (1989)
- Time to Burn (1992)
- III (2001)
- Promise Land (2010)
- Shifting Time (2022)
- Stand and Deliver (2025)

=== Live albums ===
- Live and Acoustic – Official Bootleg (2003)

=== Compilation albums ===
- It Takes Two + Giant Live (1990)

=== Extended plays ===
- Don't Leave Me In Love (2001)

=== Singles ===
Title	Release	Peak chart positions		Album
Title	Release	US	US Main	Album
"I'm a Believer"	1989	56	13	Last of the Runaways
"Innocent Days"	1990	—	11	Last of the Runaways
"I'll See You In My Dreams"	1990	20	7	Last of the Runaways
"Chained"	1992	—	16	Time to Burn
"Stay"	1992	—	—	Time to Burn
"Time to Burn"	1992	—	—	Time to Burn
