= Dave Henzerling =

- Born: David Philip Henzerling; May 3, 1961 (age 64); Cincinnati, Ohio, U.S.
- Origin: Phoenix, Arizona, U.S.
- Genres: Hard rock, heavy metal, blues rock
- Occupations: Musician; Songwriter; Record producer Film producer Software engineer
- Instruments: Guitar, bass
- Years active: 1980–present
- Labels: Capitol, Metal Blade, Frontiers, EMI, Driver Wild

David Philip Henzerling (born May 3, 1961), a.k.a. David Michael-Philips, is an American musician, songwriter and producer. He has been a member of numerous hard rock bands including Schoolboys, Keel, King Kobra, Lizzy Borden, Geronimo!, Liquid Black, Big Cock, Icon, Tunnel, Steelshine and Kelly Keeling & Friends. He is the older brother of Dan Henzerling, also a musician and has two sisters (both younger). David was born in Cincinnati, Ohio and moved to Phoenix, Arizona with his family in December 1969. He claims to have been blessed with the good fortune of "...growing up in the 60s, being a teenager in the 70s, living my 20s during the big-80s and starting a family in the 90s...I think I benefited from the best that each decade had to offer..."

Although his childhood obsession had always been drawing (he was an avid comic book collector and cartoon artist), music was always his primary passion. As a guitarist, he cites Ritchie Blackmore (Deep Purple), Edward Van Halen (Van Halen), and Ace Frehley (Kiss) as his major influences. At 14, his uncle took him to his first concert – "It was Joe Walsh and Charlie Daniels in 1975", David says, "From the first note played, I was hooked! After that, I saw pretty much every show that came to (Phoenix)".

== Career ==
=== 1979–1983: Early years ===
David was a member of the Scottsdale, AZ based hard rock cover band The Schoolboys at the end of high school in 1979. In the summer of 1980, the band had decided to start writing and performing original songs, grooming themselves to be America's version of Def Leppard, a Sheffield, England band of similar musical genre who were just starting to gain international notoriety. They released a 12" EP Singin', Shoutin' and were featured on two compilation albums by local FM radio station KDKB. That lineup was short-lived however, and both David and drummer John Covington left the band in early 1981 over creative differences in musical direction and style. The remaining members formed the band Icon which released four studio albums and one live album/DVD.

"Even at 19 years old, I had already started to get tired of the late night rock 'n roll life style and wanted to just concentrate on making great music. That and the fact that the other guys wanted to go in a more heavy metal direction along the lines of Judas Priest and Iron Maiden. I always wanted to be in a more radio-friendly, melodic, AOR format and stay away from all the leather and chains..."

— David talks about his resignation from The Schoolboys

=== 1984–1988: King Kobra ===
The decision to leave The Schoolboys was an important one, because it marked the turning point that led to Henzerling's relocation to Los Angeles in 1984 to join the band Keel. Henzerling played only one show with Keel, the band's very first on April 7 1984 at Perkins Palace in Pasadena, California, where he was quickly spotted and recruited by veteran drummer Carmine Appice (Vanilla Fudge, Rod Stewart, Ozzy Osbourne) for a new band being formed called King Kobra. Shortly after joining, the band's manager suggested David change his last name from "Henzerling" to something more Hollywood-friendly, so the pseudonym "Michael-Philips" was adopted (the use of Philips came from David's middle name). King Kobra was signed by Capitol records in June 1984 and their debut LP Ready to Strike, produced by Spencer Proffer (Quiet Riot), was released in March 1985. The band's first single, "Hunger", was featured regularly on MTV, and they toured supporting the group Autograph. A second single, "Tough Guys", was remixed by Steve Thompson (Korn, Whitney Houston, Guns N' Roses), but was never released by Capitol. King Kobra released their second album, Thrill of a Lifetime, in March 1986 and followed by touring with Kiss, Iron Maiden, Queensrÿche, and Ted Nugent. The song "Never Say Die – Iron Eagle" was featured on the soundtrack of the number one movie Iron Eagle (1986), and a video was filmed with the stars Jason Gedrick and Louis Gossett Jr. at a remote airfield in Chino, California, featuring the band members playing Air Force fighter pilots. By late 1987, following their departure from Capitol Records, King Kobra had already begun to fracture and undergo numerous line-up changes so that by the time King Kobra III was released in 1988, there was no longer a band to support the album.

=== 1989–1995: Glam metal's demise and exodus from Los Angeles ===
David performed on Lizzy Borden's critically acclaimed Master of Disguise album in 1989 (Metal Blade Records). After playing a few live shows, he opted not to officially join the band and instead formed the groups Geronimo! in 1988 and Liquid Black in 1992 after a brief stint with his old Schoolboys buddy Dan Wexler in Tomcats (1990). The Liquid Black years (1992–1995) were creative and prolific ones for David and he wrote over 70 songs with his partner and co-writer Lear Black. The band caught the eye of superstar producer Roy Thomas Baker (Queen, Journey, The Cars) and they recorded a four-song demo at Baker's studio in November 1994. The demo, however, did not result in a record contract and after experiencing the Northridge earthquake on 17 January 1994 along with the concurrent shift in the public's musical taste from glam metal to the Seattle grunge sound, David moved back to Phoenix, AZ with his new wife Kathryn and their young son.

=== 1996–2004: Family years ===
David and Kathryn had three more children during the years 1996–2001 (bringing the total offspring to four). David received his Bachelor of Science in Computer Science from Arizona State University in December 1999 and began working as a software engineer at Intel Corporation in January 2000.

=== 2005–Present: Return to music ===
In early 2005, David reunited with his Schoolboys band-mate John Covington to form the band Big C**k with vocalist Robert Mason (Lynch Mob, Warrant). The band's name was meant as a satirical jab at the music business since they figured "...no label would sign and no radio station would play anything by a band called 'Big C**k'..." (note: Big C**k is obfuscated to prevent being flagged by Wikipedia as obscene). The project was released independently and without fanfare solely for the purpose of "...creating music and having some fun...". Big C**k released three albums Year of the C**k (2005), Big C**k (2006) and Motherload (2008) as well as a digital-only greatest hits compilation Got Big C**k? (2009). The albums received positive critical acclaim for both their musicianship and unapologetic swagger. In July 2010, the song "Real Man" from the album Big C**k was used by the Strongman contestant on an episode of "America's Got Talent". The band also performed at the U.S. mega-festival Rocklahoma in 2008 and 2009 along with fellow 1980s acts Warrant, Ratt and Poison. In a further ironic twist, David also played bass guitar at the 2009 Rocklahoma with his high-school and Schoolboys band-mates Icon (who had originally replaced David after his 1981 departure and changed its name from The Schoolboys to Icon). In 2010, Italian record label Frontiers Records signed the reunited King Kobra and an album of new material was released in May 2011. A follow-up album (II) was released in 2013. David continues to compose and produce original projects as well as perform locally with his Arizona-based Classic Rock cover band Trailer Park. He lives in Scottsdale, Arizona.

== Discography ==
With Schoolboys

- Singin', Shoutin' (EP) (1980)

With King Kobra

- Ready to Strike (1985)
- Thrill of a Lifetime (1986)
- King Kobra III (1988)

as David Michael-Philips

- Black Roses (movie soundtrack) (1988)

With Lizzy Borden

- Master of Disguise (1989)
- Deal with the Devil (2000)

With Big C**k

- Year of the C**k (2005)
- Big C**k (2006)
- Motherload (2008)
- Got Big C**k? (2009) – Greatest Hits

With Tunnel

- Tunnel (2009)

With King Kobra (reunion)

- King Kobra (2011)
- II (2013)

With Steelshine

- Steelshine (2013)
