= Right Between the Eyes (album) =

Studio album by Icon
- Released: August 24, 1989
- Recorded: 1989
- Studio: Chaton Recordings, Paradise Valley, Arizona
- Genre: Hard rock; glam metal
- Length: 46:24
- Label: Megaforce/Atlantic
- Producer: Dan Wexler

Icon chronology
More Perfect Union (1987)	Right Between the Eyes (1989)	An Even More Perfect Union (1995)

Singles from Icon
- 1. "Taking My Breath Away" Released: 1989 (promo); 2. "Forever Young" Released: 1990 (promo)

Professional ratings
Review scores
Source	Rating
AllMusic	3/5 stars
Collector's Guide to Heavy Metal	6/10

Right Between the Eyes is a 1989 album by American rock band Icon. It marked a number of changes for the band, including a new record label, Megaforce Worldwide/ Atlantic Records and new guitarist Drew Bollmann, who toured with Icon from 1989 to 1991. The album was produced by guitarist Dan Wexler, Dan Zelisko, and radio personality Eddie Trunk (credited as "Ed Trunk"), who worked at Megaforce at the time. The album featured a guest vocal appearance by Alice Cooper on the tracks "Two for the Road" and "Holy Man's War". For this album Icon toured with, among others, Ace Frehley of Kiss fame and Electric Angels in the US, and with King's X in the U.K. For the last part of the tour, David Lauser, of Sammy Hagar's band, replaced drummer Dixon. The video for the first single "Taking My Breath Away" was played on MTV's Headbangers Ball in Europe and in the US.

== Track list ==
1. "Right Between the Eyes" (Dan Wexler, Jerry Harrison, Pat Dixon, Tracy Wallach) – 5:13
2. "Two for the Road" (Harrison) – 3:54
3. "Taking My Breath Away" (Wexler, Harrison, Dixon, Wallach) – 4:36
4. "A Far Cry" (Wexler, Harrison, Dixon, Wallach) – 4:19
5. "In Your Eyes" (Wexler, Harrison) – 4:00
6. "Holy Man's War" (Wexler, Harrison, Dixon, Wallach) – 7:16
7. "Bad Times" (Wexler, Harrison) – 3:25
8. "Double Life" (Wexler, Harrison, Dixon, Wallach) – 4:06
9. "Forever Young" (Wexler, Harrison) – 3:50
10. "Running Under Fire" (Wexler, Harrison) – 4:26
11. "Peace & Love" (instrumental) (Wexler, Dixon, Wallach) – 1:19

== Personnel ==
Icon

- Jerry Harrison – vocals, vocal arrangements
- Dan Wexler – guitars, guitar synthesizer, producer
- Drew Bollmann – guitars (credited, not actually playing on the album)
- Tracy Wallach – bass, vocals, vocal arrangements
- Pat Dixon – drums

Additional musicians

- Alice Cooper – guest vocals on "Two for the Road", featured character on "Holy Man's War"
- Kevin Stroller – keyboards
- Mark Prentice – keyboards on "Forever Young"

Production

- Steve Escallier – engineer, vocal arrangements
- Rich Spector – 2nd engineer
- Scott Mabuchi – mixing at Sigma Sound Studios, New York
- Lolly Grodner – mixing assistant
- Ted Jensen – mastering at Sterling Sound, New York
- Ed Trunk and Dan Zelisko – executive producers
- "Alive and Well in Hell" produced and written by Tracy Wallach
