= Smooth Up in Ya =

1988 single by Bulletboys

Single by BulletBoys

from the album BulletBoys
- B-side: "Badlands"
- Released: 1988
- Recorded: 1988
- Genre: Glam metal
- Length: 4:26
- Label: Warner Bros.
- Songwriter: BulletBoys
- Producer: Ted Templeman

BulletBoys singles chronology
"Smooth Up in Ya" (1988)	"For the Love of Money" (1989)

"Smooth Up in Ya" (also released under the title "Smooth Up") is the debut single by American rock band BulletBoys, released in 1988. It is from their self-titled debut album BulletBoys. The song was a moderate commercial success, peaking at number 71 on the Billboard Hot 100, and number 23 on the Album Rock Tracks chart in 1989.

== Music video ==
The music video features the band performing the song on a darkened stage set. Various caricature illustrations are shown throughout the video, one of which was used as the cover art for the single.

Howard Johnson writing for Classic Rock ranked the song's video at No. 10 on their list of "The Top 10 Best Hair Metal Videos".

== Track listing ==
7" single

Side A
No.	Title	Writer(s)	Length
1.	"Smooth Up"	BulletBoys	4:26

Side B
No.	Title	Writer(s)	Length
1.	"Badlands"	BulletBoys	3:07

12" single

Side A
No.	Title	Writer(s)	Length
1.	"Smooth Up"	BulletBoys	4:26

Side B
No.	Title	Writer(s)	Length
1.	"Hard as a Rock"	BulletBoys	3:03
2.	"Badlands"	BulletBoys	3:07

== In other media ==
The song is featured in the 1995 film Empire Records as well as the 2010 film Hot Tub Time Machine, but does not appear on the soundtrack. It also makes an appearance in the third episode of the HBO teen drama series Euphoria.

== Charts ==
Chart performance for "Smooth Up in Ya"
Chart (1989)	Peak position
US Billboard Hot 100	71
US Album Rock Tracks (Billboard)	23
