= Hang On St. Christopher =

Single by Tom Waits

from the album Franks Wild Years
- B-side: "Hang On St. Christopher (Instrumental)"
- Released: 1987
- Recorded: Sunset Sound Factory, Los Angeles; Los Angeles, Universal Recording Corp., Chicago
- Genre: Experimental rock
- Length: 2:46
- Label: Island
- Songwriter(s): Tom Waits
- Producer(s): Tom Waits

Tom Waits singles chronology
"Downtown Train" (1985)	"Hang On St. Christopher" (1987)	"16 Shells From a Thirty-Ought-Six" (1988)

"Hang On St. Christopher" is a song by Tom Waits appearing on his 1987 album Franks Wild Years. It was released as a single in 1987 by Island Records.

== Background ==
The song centers around Frank O'Brien, a character who Waits concocted during the making of Swordfishtrombones in 1983. A series of road oriented imagery is evoked in the lyrics, which are sung from the perspective of O'Brien, a downtrodden individual who leaves behind his family and hometown in hopes of attaining a more prosperous future. During his journey, the protagonist carries a medallion dedicated to Saint Christopher, the patron saint of travel.

Greg Cohen developed the North-African influenced horn arrangement in the recording studio and also played an alto horn on the song. A set of Leslie bass pedals were placed on a kitchen table and operated by William Schimmel using his fists. Waits explained that he gravitated toward the bass pedals due to his dissatisfaction with the sonic quality of electric basses and his belief that he had excessively relied on upright basses in the past. The song was augmented by Ralph Carney on tenor saxophone, Marc Ribot on guitar, and Michael Blair on drums. To alter the timbre of his voice, Waits sang the lyrics through a bullhorn. For the extended remix of "Hang on St. Christopher", a train sound effect was added to the track, which Waits was particularly pleased with.

== Formats and track listing ==
All songs written by Tom Waits.

US 12" single (0-96750)

1. "Hang On St. Christopher" (Extended Remixed version) – 5:02
2. "Hang On St. Christopher" (Instrumental version) – 2:50

== Personnel ==
Adapted from the liner notes.

- Tom Waits – vocals, production

Musicians

- Michael Blair – drums
- Ralph Carney – tenor saxophone
- Greg Cohen – alto horn
- Mitchell Froom – keyboards
- Marc Ribot – guitar
- William Schimmel – Leslie bass pedals

Production and additional personnel

- Greg Cohen – musical arrangement
- Biff Dawes – recording, mixing
- Danny Leake – recording
- Howie Weinberg – mastering

== Accolades ==
Year	Publication	Country	Accolade	Rank
2000	Elvis Costello	United Kingdom	The Best Songs from the 500 Best Albums Ever	*
2004	Rock and Roll Hall of Fame	United States	The Songs That Shaped Rock	*
2005	Bruce Pollock	United States	The 7,500 Most Important Songs of 1944-2000	*

(*) designates unordered lists.

== Release history ==
Region	Date	Label	Format	Catalog
United States	1987	Island	LP	0-96750

== Cover versions ==
The song was covered by BulletBoys on their second album, 1991's Freakshow, and a video was made to promote the release. The song was also covered by Rod Stewart on his 1995 album A Spanner in the Works.
