= Jimmy D'Anda =

American drummer

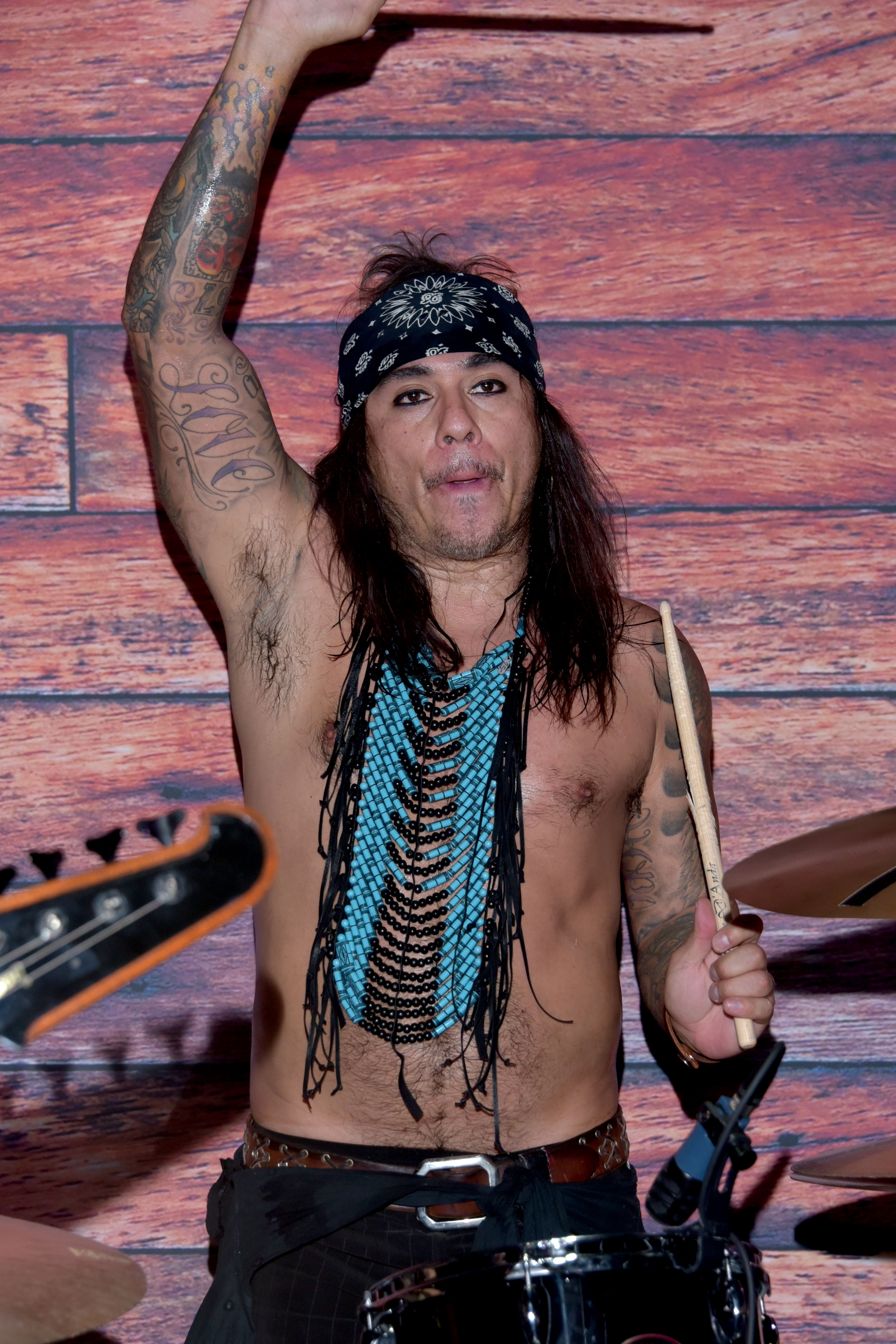
- Jimmy D'Anda performs at the NAMM Show with Gilby Clark in January 2020

Background information
- Born: Boyle Heights, Los Angeles, California, U.S.
- Genres: Glam metal, hard rock, heavy metal
- Occupation: Drummer
- Website: jimmydanda.com

Jimmy D'Anda is an American drummer who is best known as the original drummer for the Los Angeles glam metal band BulletBoys.

== Biography ==
D'Anda was born and raised in Boyle Heights, Los Angeles, California, and began playing drums at the age of 13. He created a daily drum-regimen for himself in his makeshift music room which also doubled as his bedroom. Over the next few years, D'Anda played in bands around East L.A. and the Sunset Strip until joining the band BulletBoys. The band later signed to Warner Bros. Records.

D'Anda and the band released three records with Warner Bros., performed a track featured on the Wayne's World soundtrack, and toured the world with the likes of Cheap Trick, Ozzy, Bon Jovi, Ian Hunter and Mick Ronson, Living Colour, Tesla, Cinderella, Poison and Winger. BulletBoys songs and videos are still played on outlets such as: VH-1, Sirius-XM radio, Last.fm, iLike, Yahoo Music, AOL, Pandora, Rhapsody and Music Choice. Their songs can be heard in several films and TV shows, most recently Beerfest and King of the Hill.

D'Anda was selected as the drummer to perform in a commercial for Jameson Irish Whiskey which was filmed in London and shown all around the globe. The commercial was directed by Jonas Åkerlund, who directed the movie Spun and videos for Madonna, U2, Prodigy, Metallica and The Smashing Pumpkins. D'Anda also performed on the 8th Annual Michael Douglas and Friends Celebrity Golf Tournament airing nationwide on NBC and broadcast to millions.

Over the years, Jimmy has recorded or toured with artists such as Lithium (whose songs were featured in the film Waking Up Dead), George Lynch and his band Lynch Mob, guitarist Greg Marra, frontman Jani Lane from Warrant as well as Mike Starr from Alice In Chains.

In addition to live gigs, D'Anda works in his home studio writing and recording songs for film and television. He has a master recording agreement with EMI Music Publishing where EMI has Jimmy re-record new and updated versions of selected songs from their catalog. As well, D'Anda wrote and recorded the trailer for the independent film Mexican Bloodbath.

D'Anda participated in the first major tribute for John Bonham entitled "Bonzo: The Groove Remains the Same- A Night In Honor of John Henry Bonham," which took place on September 25, 2010 – the anniversary of Bonham's death. Other notable drummers that appeared at the tribute included Steven Adler, Vinny Appice, Kenny Aronoff, Frankie Banali, Jason Bonham, Fred Coury, James Kottak, Chris Slade, Chad Smith, Brian Tichy, Joe Travers and Simon Wright, while Carmine Appice performed via video. Jimmy has also performed at all subsequent Bonzo tributes.

In 2013, Jimmy appears on the record from Doug Aldrich's band Burning Rain entitled Epic Obsession. He also toured with the band Shadow Train.

2014 – Jimmy has a couple of creative projects coming up featuring George Lynch including George's movie Shadow Nation and the band Shadow Train which recorded their album in 2013 and will be released in collaboration with the movie – Jimmy appears in the movie and is part of the Shadow Train band. Jimmy will also be recording and touring with George's Lynch Mob in 2014 featuring George Lynch and Kevin Baldes from Lit.

2015 – Jimmy has toured extensively with George Lynch and Lynch Mob featuring Oni Logan and Sean McNabb on bass. The band is currently writing a new record which will be released early 2016 where they will tour around the world in support of that record.

D'Anda endorses DW Drums, Paiste Cymbals, Vater Percussion sticks and Aquarian drum heads.
