= Carmine Appice =

American drummer (born 1946)

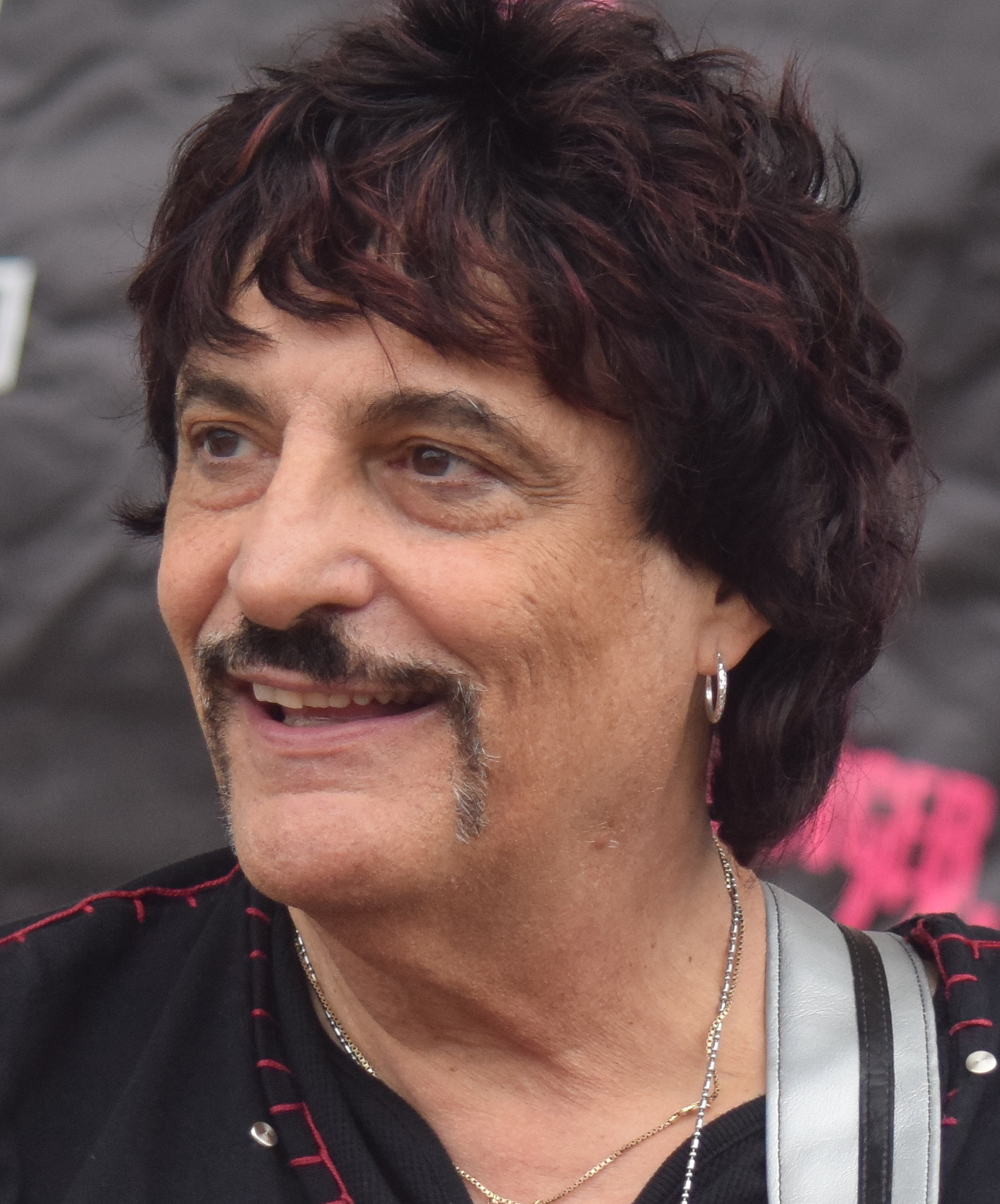
- Appice in 2015

Background information
- Born: December 15, 1946 (age 79); New York City, U.S.
- Genre: Rock
- Occupations: Musician; songwriter
- Instruments: Drums; vocals
- Years active: 1966–present
- Labels: Atlantic; Atco; Epic; Repertoire
- Member of: Vanilla Fudge; Cactus; King Kobra; Travers & Appice
- Formerly of: Beck, Bogert & Appice; Bobby and the Midnites; Blue Murder; Mother's Army; Pappo; KGB
- Website: carmineappice.net

Carmine Appice (/ˈkɑːrmaɪn æˈpiːs/; born December 15, 1946) is an American rock drummer. He is best known for his associations with Vanilla Fudge; Cactus; the power trio Beck, Bogert & Appice; Rod Stewart; King Kobra; and Blue Murder. He is the older brother of Vinny Appice. Appice was inducted into the Classic Drummer Hall of Fame in 2013 and the Modern Drummer Hall of Fame in 2014. He is also a bass player.

His best-selling drum instruction book The Realistic Rock Drum Method was first published in 1972 and has since been revised and republished as The Ultimate Realistic Rock Drum Method. It covers the basic subjects of rock rhythms and polyrhythms, linear rudiments and groupings, shuffle rhythms, hi-hat and double bass drum exercises. Appice influenced John Bonham's use of bass drum triplets and oversized drum kit. Roger Taylor, Tommy Lee, Ian Paice and Eric Singer have also credited Appice with influence on their drumming styles.

== Career ==
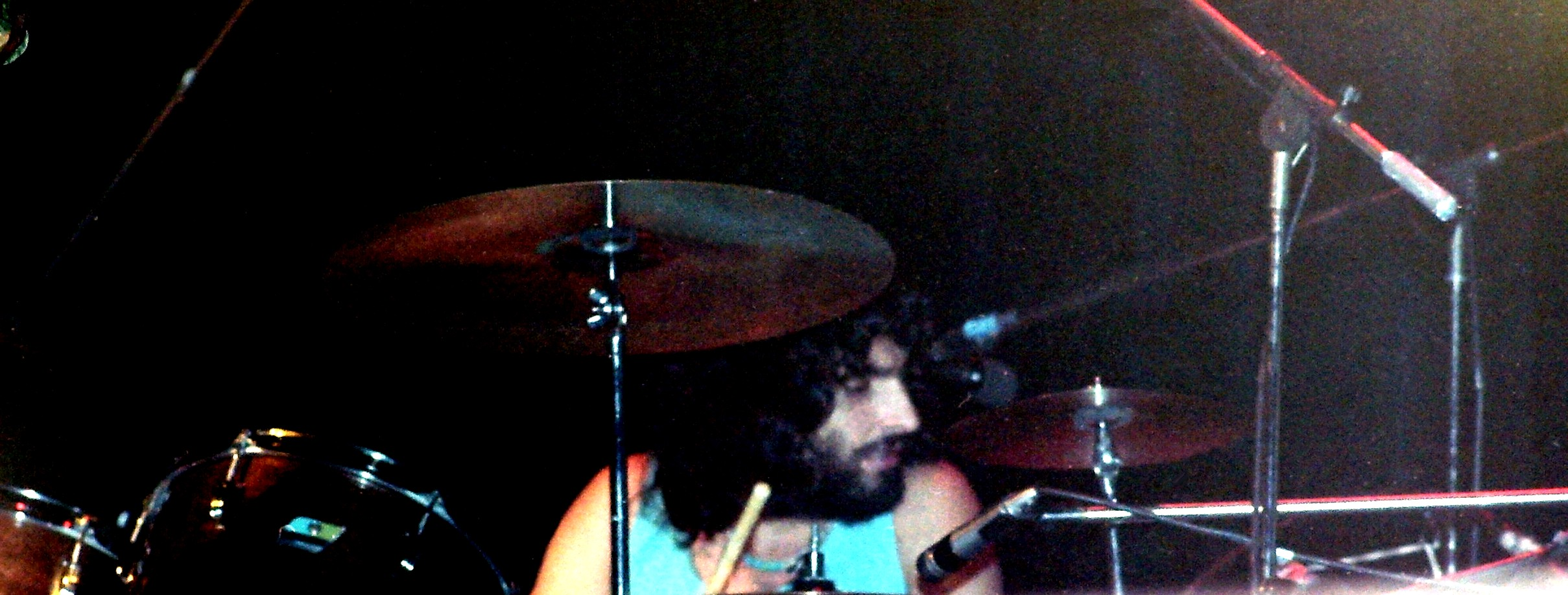
Appice performing with Beck, Bogert, and Appice, 1972

Appice received classical music training, and was influenced early on by the work of jazz drummers Buddy Rich and Gene Krupa. Appice first came to prominence as the drummer with the late 1960s psychedelic band Vanilla Fudge. He contributed distinctive background harmonies with bassist Tim Bogert. After five albums, the pair left Vanilla Fudge to form the blues rock quartet Cactus, with vocalist Rusty Day and guitarist Jim McCarty. Appice and Bogert left Cactus to join Jeff Beck in the power trio Beck, Bogert & Appice. Appice joined Rod Stewart's backing band in 1976, co-writing songs such as "Da Ya Think I'm Sexy?" and "Young Turks". He also played drums on a track on Paul Stanley's eponymous solo album (1978).

He was a member of KGB, which featured Ray Kennedy, Ric Grech, Mike Bloomfield and Barry Goldberg. Appice has recorded with artists such as Stanley Clarke, Ted Nugent and Pink Floyd. Appice and Bogert briefly joined Bob Weir's Bobby and the Midnites. He has also played with King Kobra and (alongside John Sykes) in Blue Murder. In late 1983 Appice toured with Ozzy Osbourne in support of his gold-selling Bark at the Moon album, but shortly afterward was fired from the backing group. Though Osbourne had a good relationship with him, the singer's wife and manager Sharon detested Appice, and the decision to fire him was strictly hers.

Appice recorded Caso Cerrado (1995) with the Argentine guitarist Pappo. They were also joined by bassist Tim Bogert on four songs, including "P. B. A. Boogie". He spent 1999 touring Japan with Bogert and Char in a unit called CB&A, with a live album released the following year. In 2000, Appice formed the power trio DBA with Bogert and Rick Derringer, and was reunited once again with Bogert when they reformed Vanilla Fudge.

In 2005, he became an official supporter of Little Kids Rock, a nonprofit organization that provides free musical instruments and instruction to children in less privileged public schools throughout the USA. He has personally delivered instruments to children in the program and has also performed at benefit concerts for the organization and sits on its Honorary board of directors.

In 2006, he formed the drum ensemble SLAMM in which Appice participated on drums playing alongside four young drummers; the resulting show has been described as "Stomp on steroids". The band filmed a promotional video for the Cable Network station ESPN, using a NASCAR garage as a set and mechanics' hardware as instruments. SLAMM was voted as the runner-up in the Drum magazine poll for Percussion Ensemble (2008) after a special appearance at the magazine's drum festival. The group also appears on the Modern Drummer festival DVD (2008).

He recorded Carmine Appice's Guitar Zeus: Conquering Heroes (2009). This was the third album in his Guitar Zeus series. These albums have featured guitarists such as Jennifer Batten, Brian May, Ted Nugent, Richie Sambora and Yngwie Malmsteen.

He lent his talents to the Sly Stone CD I'm Back! Family & Friends, on which he plays on the Sly classic "Stand!" It was released on August 16, 2011.

2011–2012 saw Carmine performing Drum Wars shows with his brother Vinny Appice and guitarist Michael Hund, as well a reformation of King Kobra with Johnny Rod, Mick Sweda, and David Henzerling, with Paul Shortino replacing Marcie Free on lead vocals. This lineup released an eponymous album, King Kobra, in April 2011 on the Frontiers label, which received critical acclaim. A new King Kobra album was released in 2013, titled King Kobra II, featuring the song "Have a Good Time", for which a music video was filmed in the fall of 2012 at Count's Vamp'd in Las Vegas Valley.

Appice published his memoir, Stick It!: My Life of Sex, Drums & Rock 'n' Roll, in 2016. Appice was set to play with Vinnie Vincent in a mini-reunion show slated originally for December 2018 but moved to February 2019 before ultimately being completely canceled. In 2021, Appice released Energy Overload. The album is credited to Appice Perdomo Project, which is a collaboration with multi-instrumentalist Fernando Perdomo. A second collaboration called "Running Up that Hill" was released in 2023. Appice collaborated with artist Ed Heck to create artwork to go along with the track Drum City. The artwork was animated to create a music video.

In 2024, Appice teamed with Katja Rieckermann, former saxophone player for Rod Stewart and Stewart impersonator Rob Caudill to create "Tonight's the Night: Celebrating the Music and Legacy of Rod Stewart."

== Personal life ==
On May 23, 1981, Tom Bradley, Mayor of Los Angeles, proclaimed that day as Carmine Appice Day in the city, in recognition of the drummer's charitable and educational work.

Carmine Appice lives in Florida with his longtime girlfriend, radio personality Leslie Gold, The Radio Chick.

== Pronunciation of "Appice" ==
Appice's name has been pronounced in many different ways, and both he and his brother Vinny pronounce it differently as well. The actual pronunciation is "app-uh-cee". Carmine has heard people call him "a-piece", a-pice" or "a-peach-ee". When he worked with Rod Stewart, Stewart asked him to say his surname and told Stewart everyone calls him "a-piece" but he corrects them; Stewart and Appice agreed to just go with "a-piece". An advert featuring Carmine with the text "Everyone wants a piece of the Appice" made everyone call him "a-piece" but when Vinny joined Black Sabbath he went as the correct "app-uh-cee" which according to Carmine "he (Vinny) confused everybody, and the confusion is still going on".

== Discography ==
=== Albums ===
Carmine Appice

- Rockers (1981)
- Carmine Appice's Guitar Zeus (1995)
- Carmine Appice's Guitar Zeus 2: Channel Mind Radio (1997)
- Carmine Appice's Guitar Zeus Japan (1999)
- Carmine Appice's Guitar Zeus Korea (2002)
- V8 (2008)
- Carmine Appice's Guitar Zeus: Conquering Heroes (double CD) (2009)
- Carmine Appice's Guitar Zeus 25th Anniversary (2021)

Beck, Bogert & Appice

- Beck, Bogert & Appice (1973)
- Live in Japan (1973)

Blue Murder

- Blue Murder (1989)
- Nothin' But Trouble (1993)

Cactus

- Cactus (1970)
- One Way...Or Another (1971)
- Restrictions (1971)
- 'Ot 'N' Sweaty (1972)
- Fully Unleashed: The Live Gigs (2004)
- Cactus V (2006)
- Fully Unleashed: The Live Gigs Vol. II (2007)
- Black Dawn (2016)
- Tightrope (2021)
- Temple of Blues (2024)

KGB

- KGB (1976)
- Motion (1976)

King Kobra

- Ready to Strike (1985)
- Thrill of a Lifetime (1986)
- King Kobra III (1988)
- Hollywood Trash (2001)
- King Kobra (2011)
- King Kobra II (2013)

Mother's Army

- Mothers Army (1993)
- Planet Earth (1997)

Pearl

- Pearl (1997)
- 4 Infinity (1998)

Rod Stewart

- Foot Loose & Fancy Free (1977)
- Blondes Have More Fun (1978)
- Foolish Behaviour (1980)
- Tonight I'm Yours (1981)

Travers & Appice (as duo with Pat Travers)

- It Takes A Lot of Balls (2004)
- Live at the House of Blues (2005)
- Bazooka (2006)

Vanilla Fudge

- Vanilla Fudge (1967)
- The Beat Goes On (1968)
- Renaissance (1968)
- Near the Beginning (1969)
- Rock & Roll (1969)
- Mystery (1984)
- The Best of Vanilla Fudge Live (1991)
- 2001/The Return/Then And Now (2001)
- The Real Deal – Vanilla Fudge Live (2003)
- Out Through the In Door (2007)
- Orchestral Fudge/When Two Worlds Collide (2008)
- Box of Fudge (2010)
- Spirit Of '67 (2015)

=== With others ===
- Tabernakel - Jan Akkerman (1974)
- Paul Stanley - Paul Stanley (1978)
- Night Stalker - Carmen Maki (1979)
- Nugent - Ted Nugent (1982)
- Party Tested - DNA (1983)
- Hear 'n Aid - "Stars" (1986)
- "Dogs of War" from A Momentary Lapse of Reason - Pink Floyd (1987)
- Brad Gillis - Gilrock Ranch (1993)
- Caso Cerrado - Pappo's Blues (1995)
- True Obsessions - Marty Friedman (1996)
- Cozy Powell Tribute – Cozy Powell Forever (1998)
- Live in Japan - Char, Bogart & Appice (1999)
- Doin' Business As… - Derringer, Bogart & Appice (2001)
- Moonstone Project – Time to Take a Stand/Hidden in Time (2006)
- Temple of Rock - Michael Schenker (2011)
- I'm Back! Family & Friends – Sly Stone (2011)
- Javier Vargas, Tim Bogert, Carmine Appice: Featuring Paul Shortino - Vargas, Goert & Appice (2011)
- Seeking Major Tom - William Shatner (2011)
- Who Are You – An All-Star Tribute to the Who (2012)
- Rated X - Rated X (2014)
- The Rod Experience – Rod Stewart Tribute Band, including original RS band members (2014)
- Pat Travers - The Balls (2016)
- Sinister – Appice (duo with Vinny) (2017)
- Chris Catena's Rock City Tribe – Truth in Unity (2020)
- Energy Overload - Appice Perdomo Project (dyo with Fernando Perdomo) (2021)
- Running Up That Hill - Appice Perdomo Project (dyo with Fernando Perdomo) (2023)

== Awards ==
- Hollywood's Rockwalk
- Modern Drummer: Best Rock Drummer – Editors' award (lifetime achievement)
- Sabian Cymbals: Best Rock Drummer – lifetime achievement
- Guitar Center: Legends' Award
