= Johnny Rod =

American bassist (born 1957)

- Born: John Tumminello; December 8, 1957 (age 68)
- Origin: St. Louis, Missouri, U.S.
- Genres: Heavy metal; glam metal; hard rock
- Occupation: Bassist
- Years active: 1983–present
- Member of: King Kobra
- Formerly of: W.A.S.P.

John Tumminello (born December 8, 1957), better known as Johnny Rod, is an American musician, best known as a former bassist of the heavy metal band W.A.S.P.

== Biography ==
Tumminello grew up in St. Louis, Missouri. According to his own statements, he started performing at the age of 11. One of the bands he played with was King Kobra from 1983 to 1986.

In 1986, Rod received an offer to join W.A.S.P. His main bass at that time was a yellow B.C. Rich Ironbird. He played on the albums Inside the Electric Circus (1986), Live... in the Raw (1987) and The Headless Children (1989) and accompanied the band on their 1992 farewell tour. Later attempts for a reunion of the classic lineup failed, mainly due to singer Blackie Lawless, according to Rod, as well as the rest of the members of W.A.S.P. during that era.

In 2010, Rod reunited with King Kobra. The band went on hiatus after two album releases in 2013, and reunited again in 2016 for several live performances.

In 2017, Rod collaborated with Carmine Appice on "Monsters and Heroes", a tribute cover song to Ronnie James Dio.

Rod has used both Fender and B.C. Rich basses during his career. He lists the Fender Precision bass is his all-time favorite guitar.

Rod is a registered sex offender and was arrested in 2022 for failing to register as required in Florida.
