= For the Love of Money =

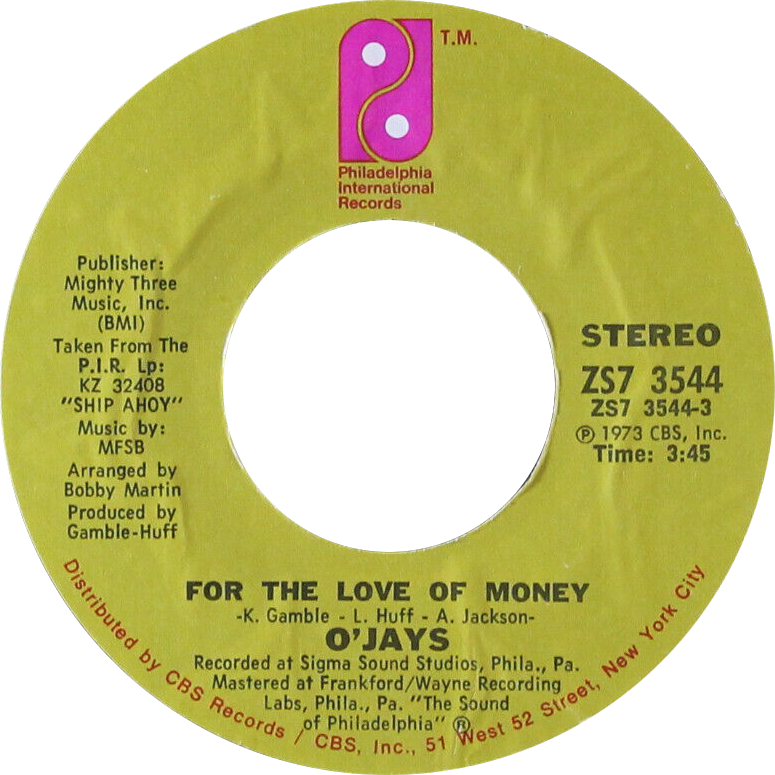
- Side A of the US single

Single by The O'Jays

from the album Ship Ahoy
- B-side: "People Keep Tellin' Me"
- Released: April 1974 (US)
- Recorded: October 3, 1973
- Studio: Sigma Sound, Philadelphia, Pennsylvania
- Genre: Progressive soul; Proto-Disco
- Length: 3:42 (single version); 7:14 (album version)
- Label: Philadelphia International; 3544
- Songwriters: Kenneth Gamble; Leon Huff; Anthony Jackson
- Producer: Gamble and Huff

The O'Jays singles chronology
"Christmas Ain't Christmas New Year's Ain't New Year's Without The One You Love" (1973)	"For the Love of Money" (1974)	"Sunshine" (1974)

Audio
- "For the Love of Money" (album version) on YouTube

"For the Love of Money" is a soul, R&B, proto-disco song that was written and composed by Kenneth Gamble, Leon Huff, and Anthony Jackson; it was recorded by Philadelphia soul group the O'Jays for the album Ship Ahoy. Produced by Gamble and Huff for Philadelphia International Records, "For the Love of Money" was issued as a single in late 1973, with "People Keep Tellin' Me" as its B-side. The single peaked at number three on the U.S. Billboard R&B chart, and at No. 9 on Billboard's Pop Singles chart in spring 1974. Though the album version of the song was over seven minutes long, it received substantial radio airplay.

The song's title comes from a well-known Bible verse, 1 Timothy 6:10: "For the love of money is the root of all evil: which while some coveted after, they have erred from the faith, and pierced themselves through with many sorrows." (This translation is from the King James Version of the Bible.) The lyrics, which refer to the poor "really need[ing]" money and describe the various things people will do for money, are a condemnation of greed and materialism. The song was also used as the opening theme song for NBC's The Apprentice as well as Donald Trump's WWE entrance music.

== Production ==
Anthony Jackson played bass guitar on the song. One day during fall 1973, producer/keyboardist Leon Huff was leading the members of the MFSB rhythm section and Jackson through a rehearsal. Sigma Sound Studios owner/engineer Joe Tarsia noticed that Jackson had a wah-wah pedal attached to his Fender Precision Bass. Tarsia decided to run Jackson's bassline through a phaser, giving it a swishing sound and later mixed in echo. During the final mixing of the track, Kenny Gamble impulsively reached over to the echo button and added echo to Jackson's opening riffs.

== Credits ==
- Eddie Levert – vocals
- William Powell – vocals
- Walter Williams – vocals
- Leon Isley Brooks – keyboards
- Anthony Jackson – bass, composer, lyricist
- MFSB – orchestra, various instruments
- Lenny Pakula – arranger
- Joe Tarsia – engineer
- Kenny Gamble – producer, composer, lyricist
- Leon Huff – producer, composer, lyricist

== Awards and accolades ==
"For the Love of Money" was nominated for the 1975 Grammy Award for Best R&B Vocal Performance – Duo, Group or Chorus, losing to "Tell Me Something Good" by Rufus.

In 2016, "For the Love of Money" was inducted into the Grammy Hall of Fame.

== Chart history ==
=== Weekly charts ===
Chart (1974)	Peak position
Canada RPM Top Singles	29
US Billboard Hot 100	9
US Billboard R&B	3
US Cash Box Top 100	7

=== Year-end charts ===
Chart (1974)	Rank
US Billboard Hot 100	75

== Sources ==
- Jisi, Chris: "The Anthony Jackson Interview." Bass Player Magazine, Spring 1990.
- Jisi, Chris: "The Anthony Jackson Interview." Bass Player Magazine, Summer 1990.
- Jisi, Chris: "Spontaneous Combustion: Anthony Jackson & Michel Camilo." Bass Player Magazine, May 2002.
