= In the Land of the Rising Sun: Live in Japan 2001 =

Live album by Renaissance
- Released: 2 July 2002 (Japan); 14 October 2002 (UK)
- Recorded: 16 March 2001
- Venue: Koseinenkin Hall, Tokyo, Japan
- Genre: Progressive rock
- Length: 104:45
- Label: EMI Music Japan; Giant Electric Pea (UK)
- Producer: Rave Tesar; Annie Haslam; Masa Matsuzaki; Takayuki Watanabe

Renaissance chronology
Tuscany (2000)	In the Land of the Rising Sun: Live in Japan 2001 (2002)	Grandine il vento (2013)

Professional ratings
Review scores
Source	Rating
AllMusic	3.5/5 stars
Classic Rock	6/10 stars

In the Land of the Rising Sun: Live in Japan 2001 is a live album by the English progressive rock band Renaissance. It was released in 2002 by Giant Electric Pea. The album was recorded in Tokyo, Japan in 2001.

== Track listing ==
=== Disc one ===
1. "Carpet of the Sun" (Michael Dunford, Betty Newsinger) - 3:49
2. "Opening Out" (Jon Camp, Dunford) - 4:24
3. "Midas Man" (Dunford, Newsinger) - 6:31
4. "Lady from Tuscany" (Dunford, Annie Haslam) - 7:07
5. "Pearls of Wisdom" (Dunford, Haslam) - 4:41
6. "Dear Landseer" (Dunford, Haslam) - 5:40
7. "Northern Lights" (Dunford, Newsinger) - 4:21
8. "Moonlight Shadow" (Mike Oldfield) - 4:08
9. "Precious One" (Dunford, Haslam) - 4:48
10. "Ananda" (Haslam, Rave Tesar) - 5:42

=== Disc two ===
1. "Mother Russia" (Dunford, Newsinger) - 10:31
2. "Trip to the Fair" (Dunford, Newsinger, John Tout) - 11:53
3. "One Thousand Roses" (Dunford, Haslam) - 7:53
4. "I Think of You" (Dunford, Newsinger) - 3:20
5. "Ashes Are Burning" (Dunford, Newsinger) - 19:57

== Personnel ==
=== Renaissance ===
- Annie Haslam - lead vocals, producer
- Michael Dunford - acoustic guitar, backing vocals
- Mickey Simmonds - keyboards, backing vocals
- Rave Tesar - piano, keyboards, producer, mixing, mastering
- David J. Keyes - bass, backing vocals
- Terence Sullivan - drums, percussion

=== Production ===
- Yoshiuki Tsuboi - recording engineer
- Tomomi Shimura - assistant engineer
- Masa Matsuzaki, Takayuki Watanabe - recording producers
- Ken DiMaio, Live Sound Engineer
