= Nevada (British band) =

British folk/progressive rock band

Nevada were a British folk/progressive rock band and a spin-off from Renaissance, featuring Annie Haslam on vocals and Mick Dunford on guitar. Their Christmas single, "In the Bleak Midwinter", reached the lower edges of the UK singles chart in 1983.

== Background ==
Renaissance had been moderately successful during the 1970s, having a top ten UK singles chart hit in 1978 with "Northern Lights", but were better known as an album band, and for their live performances, particularly at Carnegie Hall. In 1979, the band had taken a less symphonic/orchestral and more electronically based turn with the album Azure d'Or, which resulted in disappointing sales and resultant dropping by their label, Warner Bros. Records. Meanwhile, the line-up of Renaissance was in flux, as John Tout and Terry Sullivan left for varying reasons.

== Nevada ==
"In The Bleak Midwinter"
- Picture sleeve of the single

Single by Nevada
- Recorded: 1982
- Genre: Folk rock
- Label: Polydor
- Songwriter: Holst/Rossetti

Nevada singles chronology
| "In The Bleak Midwinter" | ""You Know I Like It"" |

The reduced version of Renaissance then took stock; according to the sleeve notes to their CD, "It was time to stand back, take a breather, experiment, and to embark on a new working relationship with their fellow countryman Peter Gosling". Gosling had been in the 1960s band "Moon's Train" which had been managed and produced by Bill Wyman, played keyboards on the Renaissance album Camera Camera and later on Time-Line. The single "In the Bleak Midwinter", a version of the Christmas carol by Gustav Holst and Christina Rossetti was released for the 1982 Christmas market, but did not enter the UK singles chart until 8 January 1983. It spent one week on the chart at number 71. Their second single, "You Know I Like It" did not trouble the charts and the project went no further. Renaissance finally folded in 1987; Haslam and Dunford embarked on solo careers, and Gosling wrote music for television and film.

== Pictures in the Fire ==
Pictures in the Fire

Compilation album by Nevada
- Released: 2000
- Recorded: 1981–1982
- Genre: Folk rock/progressive rock
- Label: Mooncrest

This was a compilation CD of Nevada's material, released in 2000 by Mooncrest Records; as well as the four single tracks, it included six other songs, and five bonus tracks recorded by Renaissance. The versions of the tracks released as singles are different on this compilation, possibly due to licensing issues, and the recording quality varies greatly.

=== Track listing ===
All tracks credited to "Dunford/Gosling" except where noted

1. "Pictures in the Fire" - 3:19
2. "You Know I Like It" - 4:46
3. "Once In a Lifetime" - 3:44
4. "Star of the Show" - 4:03
5. "Fairies" - 4:44 (a precursor to "Faeries (Living At The Bottom Of The Garden)" which appeared on Camera Camera in 1981)
6. "Lady of the Sea" - 3:06
7. "Mr Spaceman" (Jim McGuinn) - 4:32
8. "Tokyo" - 3:01 (written as a candidate for the Eurovision Song Contest)
9. "In the Bleak Midwinter" - 3:44
10. "Motorway Madness" - 4:16

Renaissance bonus tracks

All tracks credited to "Dunford/Newsinger" except where noted; Newsinger is the birth name of Renaissance lyricist Betty Thatcher

1. "Love Is a State of Mind" - 3:30
2. "I Am a Stranger" - 4:16
3. "On and On" - 4:15
4. "No Beginning No End" - 4:15
5. "Mother Russia" - 10:21

== Discography ==
Singles

- 1980: "In The Bleak Midwinter"/"Pictures In The Fire"- Polydor POSP 203
- 1981: "You Know I Like It"/"Once In A Lifetime"- Polydor POSP 229

Album

- 2000: Pictures In The Fire Mooncrest Records CREST CD 054

== Personnel ==
- Annie Haslam - vocals
- Mick Dunford - guitar
- Peter Gosling - keyboards, vocals
- Raphael Rudd - keyboards
- Mark Lambert - guitars
