= Novella (album) =

Studio album by Renaissance
- Released: January 1977 (North America); August 1977 (UK)
- Recorded: November 1976
- Studios: De Lane Lea Studios, Wembley, UK
- Genre: Progressive rock
- Length: 40:15
- Labels: Sire (US/Canada); Warner Bros. (UK)
- Producer: Renaissance

Renaissance chronology
Live at Carnegie Hall (1976)	Novella (1977)	A Song for All Seasons (1978)

1st (ABC Distribution) US release cover

Professional ratings
Review scores
Source	Rating
AllMusic	2/5 stars

Novella is the seventh studio album by the English progressive rock band Renaissance, released in 1977. Bassist Jon Camp began working as a lyricist for this album, making it the first Renaissance album since Illusion (1971) to include songs written entirely by the band members themselves.

== Background and recording ==
For Novella Renaissance returned to De Lane Lea Studios, where they had recorded Ashes Are Burning and Turn of the Cards, wanting to again work with the studio's engineer, Dick Plant. Though Renaissance are credited with producing the album by themselves, the band members have said that Plant essentially co-produced the album, as he did with Ashes Are Burning and Turn of the Cards.

With Novella bassist Jon Camp wrote lyrics for the group for the first time, usually with guitarist Michael Dunford collaborating with him on the music. Camp recalled, "Micky [Dunford] used to come along with the sort of main body of the song and then I used to go and stay at his house in Surrey. We'd spend 2-3 weeks together and then we’d extend the song, we'd write some music to go into it and then we'd take it to rehearsals ..."

The band had done virtually no pre-production or rehearsals of the material before entering the studio, or even worked out the arrangements. As a result, recording the album took two months.

To achieve the percussive effect on "Can You Hear Me?", drummer Terence Sullivan ran a gong through a flanger, while for "Midas Man" he shook a bag filled with coins. While recording "Touching Once (Is so Hard to Keep)", Richard Hewson, who handled the string arrangements for the album, suggested that a member of the orchestra perform a saxophone solo during the song; though Sullivan described the solo as "brilliant", the saxophonist was not credited for this contribution, and none of the members of Renaissance knew his name.

== Release history and cover art ==
Due to the bankruptcy of the band's UK label BTM, Renaissance had no UK record deal at the time Novella was completed. In the USA, however, they were still under contract to Sire Records, so Pamela Brown, an in-house artist for Sire, painted a cover for Novella, and the album was released in the USA in January 1977. At the time of this original issue, Sire was distributed in the USA by ABC Records.

Though Renaissance selected the design for the cover art from several sketches Brown showed them, they were dismayed when they saw the completed version, according to vocalist Annie Haslam, because "the woman on the cover looks like a nun, or someone symbolic of Mother Mary, which was very misleading." Meanwhile, getting a UK release for the album proved a struggle. CBS Records expressed interest, and even did test pressings of Novella, but ultimately Warner Bros. Records were the label to sign the band. With the UK release not arriving until September, a number of UK fans imported copies of the USA release. Renaissance still wanted the cover art altered to eliminate the nun resemblance, and persuaded Warner Bros. that producing an alternate cover for the UK release could help offset the loss of sales to fans importing the USA version. Accordingly, the UK version used new cover art, again painted by Pamela Brown and still using the same design sketch, but addressing Renaissance's complaints with the original version. Shortly thereafter, Sire changed distribution in the USA to Warner Bros. Records, and the cover artwork was revised to use the same painting as that employed in its UK issue. The 2nd USA issue can most easily be identified by the rendering of the band which takes up the entire back cover; the original ABC-distributed cover features a much smaller painting of the band on the back.

In the USA the album was initially released with unique cover art by Sire Records in March 1977 under its distribution deal with ABC Records, and was assigned the catalog number SA-7526. It was subsequently re-released with revised cover artwork with the catalog number SR-6024 after Sire moved its distribution to Warner. In the UK it was given a scheduled release in the same month by CBS with the catalog number S CBS 82137 and although some test pressings were made, the release did not go ahead. The album was eventually released by Warner Bros. in the UK on 2 September 1977 with the catalog number K 56422. It was also released in Japan in 1978 on the Warner Brothers / Pioneer label, catalog number WB P10492W.

The album charted at No. 46 in the Billboard 200 chart in the USA, being the band's highest charting album in that country.

The song "Can You Hear Me?" was sampled in the Deep Puddle Dynamics' We Ain't Fessin' (Double Quotes), and Blockheads' Music by Cavelight track "Sunday Seance".

Esoteric Recordings released a re-mastered, three CD expanded edition of the album on 5 July 2019.

== Track listing ==
Side one
No.	Title	Writer(s)	Length
1.	"Can You Hear Me? (Note: The album's lyrics sheet identifies the song as "Can You Hear Me Call Your Name"; the band also often introduced the song under this longer, unpunctuated title in concerts.)"	Jon Camp, Michael Dunford, Betty Thatcher	13:39
2.	"The Sisters"	Dunford, Thatcher, John Tout	7:14

Side two
No.	Title	Writer(s)	Length
3.	"Midas Man"	Dunford, Thatcher	5:45
4.	"The Captive Heart"	Camp, Dunford	4:12
5.	"Touching Once (Is So Hard to Keep)"	Camp, Dunford	9:25

=== Expanded edition ===
2019 re-issue Disc one - re-mastered & expanded edition
No.	Title	Writer(s)	Length
1.	"Can You Hear Me?"	Jon Camp, Michael Dunford, Betty Thatcher	13:39
2.	"The Sisters"	Dunford, Thatcher, John Tout	7:14
3.	"Midas Man"	Dunford, Thatcher	5:45
4.	"The Captive Heart"	Camp, Dunford	4:16
5.	"Touching Once (Is So Hard to Keep)"	Camp, Dunford	9:25
6.	"Can You Hear Me?" (single edit (Note: This track was actually assembled specifically for the expanded edition; "Can You Hear Me?" was never released on a single, and in fact this "single edit" is too long to fit onto one side of a 7 inch 45 RPM disc, which was the universal format for singles at the time. The "single edit" designation is seemingly meant as a joke.))	Jon Camp, Michael Dunford, Betty Thatcher	8:08
7.	"Midas Man" (single edit)	Dunford, Thatcher	3:32

2019 re-issue Disc two - Live at the Royal Albert Hall, London, 14 October 1977
No.	Title	Writer(s)	Length
1.	"Prologue"	Dunford
2.	"Can You Understand"	Dunford, Thatcher, Maurice Jarre (Note: Many earlier releases of the song credit only Dunford and Thatcher, since the band mistakenly thought the section taken from Jarre's work was in the public domain.)
3.	"Carpet of the Sun"	Dunford, Thatcher
4.	"Can You Hear Me?"	Camp, Dunford, Thatcher
5.	"Song of Scheherazade" a. "Fanfare" (John Tout) b. "The Betrayal" (Jon Camp, Tout, Dunford) c. "The Sultan" (Dunford, Thatcher) d. "Love Theme" (Camp) e. "The Young Prince and Princess as told by Scheherazade" (Dunford, Thatcher) f. "Festival Preparations" (Camp, Tout, Dunford) g. "Fugue for the Sultan" (Tout) h. "The Festival" (Dunford, Thatcher) i. "Finale" (Camp, Tout, Dunford)"

2019 re-issue Disc three - Live at the Royal Albert Hall, London, 14 October 1977
No.	Title	Writer(s)	Length
1.	"Running Hard"	Dunford, Thatcher
2.	"Midas Man"	Dunford, Thatcher
3.	"Mother Russia"	Dunford, Thatcher
4.	"Touching Once (Is So Hard to Keep)"	Camp, Dunford
5.	"Ashes Are Burning"	Dunford, Thatcher

== Personnel ==
=== Renaissance ===
- Annie Haslam – lead and backing vocals
- Michael Dunford – acoustic guitars, backing vocals
- John Tout – piano, analogue synthesizers, Hohner D6 clavinet
- Jon Camp – bass, acoustic guitars, co-lead vocals on "The Captive Heart", backing vocals, Moog bass pedals, cello on "The Sisters"
- Terence Sullivan – drums, percussion, backing vocals

=== Additional musicians ===
- Richard Hewson - orchestral arrangements & conductor
- uncredited - saxophone solo on "Touching Once"

=== Production ===
- Dick Plant - engineer, co-producer [uncredited]
- Barry Kidd - assistant engineer
