= Mother Russia (Renaissance song) =

Single by Renaissance

from the album Turn of the Cards
- B-side: "I Think of You"
- Released: 7 October 1974 (US)
- Genre: Progressive rock
- Length: 9:30 (album); 3:07 (single)
- Label: BTM; Sire; RCA
- Songwriters: Michael Dunford (music); Betty Thatcher (lyrics)
- Producers: Richard Gottehrer; Dick Plant

Renaissance singles chronology
"Carpet of the Sun" (1973)	"Mother Russia" (1974)	""Carpet of the Sun" (live)" (1976)

"Mother Russia" is the closing song on Renaissance's 1974 album Turn of the Cards. It also appears on the 1976 live album Live at Carnegie Hall, the compilation Tales of 1001 Nights, Vol. 1, and several other Renaissance concert albums.

The song is a tribute to Russian fiction writer Aleksandr Solzhenitsyn, who had been forced by the USSR government to leave the Soviet Union earlier in 1974. Written as usual by poet Betty Thatcher, the lyrics are based on Solzhenitsyn's famous fiction novel about Soviet repression, One Day in the Life of Ivan Denisovich. Because fans of the band were surprised at the move into topical songwriting, singer Annie Haslam has had often to point out to interviewers that "Mother Russia" really refers to Solzhenitsyn.

Musically, the full version of "Mother Russia" begins with a sparse, string-driven introduction marked by occasional piano crescendos. Around two minutes into the song, Haslam's voice enters, and the next three minutes of the song contain six verses in three pairs describing Solzhenitsyn's plight, in between which are short interludes of strings and acoustic guitar.

The last five minutes of the full song consist of a three-minute instrumental interlude with the full band performing over wordless vocals by Haslam, followed by a repeat of the last two verses to finish. Recording engineer and co-producer Dick Plant stated:

I think that the real thrust of the music came from John Tout's piano. I don't think Renaissance ever wanted to do anything that they couldn't reproduce on stage.

The music to "Mother Russia" is credited to Michael Dunford, but the song is cited by Renaissance bassist Jon Camp as being a case where he made major compositional contributions without being credited for them; he claims authorship of the instrumental interlude.

== Personnel ==
Renaissance

- Annie Haslam – lead vocals
- Michael Dunford – acoustic guitar
- Jon Camp – bass, backing vocals
- John Tout – keyboards
- Terence Sullivan – drums, percussion

Additional personnel

- Jimmy Horowitz – orchestral arrangements

== Single ==
A version of "Mother Russia" edited down to three minutes and seven seconds was released as a single in the United States only. Although its parent album, Turn of the Cards, peaked at #94 on Billboard, the single did not go anywhere near the Billboard Hot 100.
