= Northern Lights (Renaissance song) =

- 7" picture disc. Clockwise from upper left: Terry Sullivan, Michael Dunford, John Tout, Annie Haslam, and Jon Camp.

Single by Renaissance

from the album A Song for All Seasons
- B-side: "Opening Out"
- Released: 26 May 1978
- Recorded: November 1977 – January 1978, London
- Genre: Progressive rock
- Length: 4:06 (Album version); 4:06 (Picture disc); 3:29 (Single version)
- Label: Warner Bros.; Sire
- Songwriters: Michael Dunford (music); Betty Thatcher-Newsinger (lyrics)
- Producer: David Hentschel

Renaissance singles chronology
"Back Home Once Again" (1977)	"Northern Lights" (1978)	"The Winter Tree" (1979)

Audio sample
- "Northern Lights": file; help

"Northern Lights" is a song by the English progressive rock band Renaissance, released in 1978 from their album A Song for All Seasons. It was the band's only hit single, reaching No. 10 on the UK Singles Chart.

== Composition ==
There is no actual reference to the Aurora Borealis in the lyrics; it is merely a play on words in the title. The first verse begins with: "Destination outward bound, I turn to see the northern lights behind the wing..." suggesting a different meaning. Songfacts.com quoted lead singer Annie Haslam as commenting:

The song is about leaving the Northern Lights of England... and Roy Wood behind, when I was working over in the U.S.

Wood is known for having been a founding member of The Move, the Electric Light Orchestra (ELO), and Wizzard. Haslam and Wood had a four-year relationship. Lyricist Betty Thatcher-Newsinger wrote about the feelings of loneliness and separation Haslam was experiencing whilst she was on tour, based on the personal conversations between the two. Hence, the lines "though it's hard away from you" and "I'm missing you near me" accentuate the theme. Earlier songs such as "Ocean Gypsy" and "Trip to the Fair" were similarly founded in Haslam's life experiences and friendships, the latter also involving Wood.

== Charts ==
"Northern Lights" entered the UK singles charts on 15 July 1978 and remained there for 11 weeks, peaking at No. 10. It was at No. 7 on Melody Maker's Top 30 Singles chart on 19 August 1978. Renaissance performed "Northern Lights" live on The Mike Douglas Show on 4 May 1978 in the U.S. The single was featured on Top of the Pops on 13 July 1978, and 10 August 1978. It was awarded a Silver disc on 1 September 1978 by the British Phonographic Industry (BPI).

== Personnel ==
- Annie Haslam — lead and backing vocals
- Jon Camp — bass, backing vocals
- Michael Dunford — acoustic guitar (6 and 12 string), electric guitar
- John Tout — keyboards
- Terry Sullivan — drums, percussion
- Royal Philharmonic Orchestra
- Harry Rabinowitz — conductor
- Barry Griffiths — leader of the orchestra
