= Annie in Wonderland =

Studio album by Annie Haslam
- Released: 1977
- Studios: De Lane Lea Music Centre, Wembley, UK
- Genres: Symphonic rock, progressive rock
- Length: 41:06
- Labels: Warner Bros. K56453 (UK); Sire SP 6046 (US)
- Producer: Roy Wood

Annie Haslam chronology
Annie in Wonderland (1977)	Still Life (1985)

Annie in Wonderland is the first solo album by Annie Haslam, vocalist with the 1970s band Renaissance. It was produced by Roy Wood, who also wrote some of the material, arranged all the songs, played nearly all of the instruments (including an uncredited lead vocal on "I Never Believed in Love"), and illustrated the cover. The album features a range of musical styles enabling Haslam to experiment with vocal styles outside the ethos of Renaissance. The range for which Haslam is well-known is still apparent, however, especially in the showcase number "Rockalise". The album peaked at No. 167 on the Billboard "pop albums" chart.

== Album cover ==
Annie in Wonderland was originally released in a gatefold sleeve featuring original artwork by Roy Wood. Many of John Tenniel's characters from Lewis Carroll's Alice In Wonderland appear, in particular the Knave of Hearts (as a teddy boy), the March Hare (as a football supporter), and the caterpillar (as Wood himself) - the caricatures are reasonably faithful to the original illustrations. The interior features photographs of the performers, friends and family as well as the track listing and credits.

== Reception ==
Professional ratings
Review scores
Source	Rating
AllMusic	3/5 stars

Allmusic's reviewer retrospectively described the album as "whimsical, fanciful, and verging on precious". They did, however, praise "If I Loved You" and, referring to "Nature Boy", comment that "Haslam gets right to the heart of this beautifully soulful song".

Annie Haslam "Rockalise" (1977)
30 second sample from Annie Haslam's "Rockalise" illustrating her soprano voice with accompaniment by Roy Wood

== Track listing ==
Side one

1. "Introlise" – 0:30
2. "If I Were Made of Music" (Jon Camp) – 4:29
3. "I Never Believed in Love" (Roy Wood) – 3:38
4. "If I Loved You" (Richard Rodgers, Oscar Hammerstein II) – 4:38
5. "Hunioco" (Wood) – 7:32

Side two

1. "Rockalise" (Wood) – 6:08 – to alison (refers to WNEW-FM radio personality Alison Steele)
2. "Nature Boy" (Eden Ahbez) – 4:53
3. "Inside My Life" (Camp) – 4:50
4. "Going Home" (Antonín Dvořák, William Arms Fisher) – 5:06

== Personnel ==
=== Musicians ===
- Annie Haslam - lead vocals, backing vocals
- Roy Wood - electric and acoustic guitars, bass guitar, string bass, mandolin, cello, balalaikas, saxophones, drums, bass clarinet, trumpet, African drums, percussion, string ensemble, Moog, piano, clavinet, backing vocals, co-lead vocals on "I Never Believed in Love"
- Jon Camp - bass guitar on "I Never Believed in Love", "Nature Boy" and "Inside My Life"; bass pedals and acoustic guitar on "If I Were Made of Music"; backing vocals on "Inside My Life"
- Dave Donovan - drums on "Nature Boy" and "If I Were Made of Music"
- Louis Clark - polymoog and string arrangements on "Rockalise", brass and choir arrangements and flute on "Going Home"

=== Production ===
- Roy Wood - producer
- Dick Plant - engineering, backing vocals
- Barry Kidd - assistant engineer
- Tim Young - mastering
