= Still Life (Annie Haslam album) =

Studio album by Annie Haslam
- Released: 1985
- Recorded: 1984–85
- Genre: Symphonic rock
- Length: 39:05
- Label: Spartan Music (UK); One Way Records (US)
- Producer: Louis Clark

Annie Haslam chronology
Annie in Wonderland (1978)	Still Life (1985)	Annie Haslam (1989)

Still Life is the second solo album by Renaissance vocalist Annie Haslam, recorded with Louis Clark and the Royal Philharmonic Orchestra in 1985. The album consists of popular classical tunes set to the lyrics of poet and Renaissance lyricist Betty Thatcher. A remastered two-disc edition was released on April 25, 2011, with the second disc offering an instrumental version of each song.

== Reception ==
Professional ratings
Review scores
Source	Rating
Allmusic	4.5/5 stars

The Bolton News described Still Life as the marriage of classical and popular music at its very best. Allmusic's Tomas Mureika retrospectively called it "one of Haslam's career highlights: a gorgeous, lyrical, and endlessly listenable collection of classical pop nuggets, topped off with brilliant—often profound—lyrics."

== Track listing ==
1. "Forever Bound" (Adagio cantabile from Symphony No. 5, Tchaikovsky)
2. "Still Life" (Air from Suite No. 3 in D major, J. S. Bach)
3. "One Day" (Berceuse from Dolly, Fauré)
4. "Ave Verum" (Mozart)
5. "Shine" (Gymnopédie No. 2, Satie) (Note: Actually based on Gymnopédie No. 1, but incorrectly identified on all releases of the album.)
6. "Careless Love" (Étude Op. 10 No. 3, Chopin)
7. "Glitter and Dust" (Swan Lake, Tchaikovsky)
8. "The Day You Strayed" (Pavane, Fauré)
9. "Save Us All" (Adagio in G minor, Giazotto)
10. "Skaila" (La Calinda, Delius)
11. "Bitter Sweet" (The Swan from Carnival of the Animals, Saint-Saëns)
12. "Chains and Threads" (Tannhäuser, Wagner)

== Additional musicians ==
- Skaila Kanga - harp
- Trevor Bastow - piano
- Andy Pask - bass guitar
- Barry de Souza - drums
