= Tuscany (album) =

Studio album by Renaissance
- Released: 25 October 2000 (Japan); 2001 (UK)
- Recorded: 1987, 1999
- Studio: Astra Studio, Monks Horton, Kent, England
- Genre: Progressive rock
- Length: 49:23
- Label: EMI Music Japan; Giant Electric Pea (UK)
- Producer: Michael Dunford; Annie Haslam; Roy Wood

Renaissance chronology
Time-Line (1983)	Tuscany (2000)	In the Land of the Rising Sun: Live in Japan 2001 (2002)

Professional ratings
Review scores
Source	Rating
AllMusic	3/5 stars
Classic Rock	5/10 stars

Tuscany is the 12th album by the English progressive rock band Renaissance, released in 2001. After a lengthy hiatus, former members Annie Haslam, Michael Dunford, Terence Sullivan and John Tout came together to record a new album, assisted by Roy Wood; Tout was unavailable for the later sessions and was replaced by Mickey Simmonds.

Although the album led to one London date on 9 March 2001 followed by a short tour of Japan, with Haslam, Dunford, Sullivan and Simmonds augmented by Rave Tesar (keyboards) and David J. Keyes (bass, vocals), Annie Haslam subsequently announced that the band was again disbanding.

== Track listing ==
All tracks are written by Michael Dunford and Annie Haslam.

No.	Title	Length
1.	"Lady from Tuscany"	6:41
2.	"Pearls of Wisdom"	4:25
3.	"Eva's Pond"	3:42
4.	"Dear Landseer"	5:21
5.	"In the Sunshine"	4:25
6.	"In My Life"	5:26
7.	"The Race"	5:00
8.	"Dolphin's Prayer"	3:22
9.	"Life in Brazil"	3:43
10.	"One Thousand Roses"	7:12

== Personnel ==
=== Renaissance ===
- Annie Haslam - lead and backing vocals, producer
- Michael Dunford - guitars, backing vocals, producer
- Terence Sullivan - drums, percussion
- Mickey Simmonds - keyboards, backing vocals, orchestral arrangements

=== Guest musicians ===
- John Tout - piano on tracks 2 and 4, harpsichord on track 4, keyboards on track 8
- Roy Wood - bass on tracks 4 and 5, keyboards and orchestral arrangements on track 5, backing vocals on track 8, percussion on track 9, producer on track 5
- Alex Caird - bass guitar on tracks 1, 2, 6, 7, 9 and 10

=== Production ===
- Rob Williams, David Woolgar - engineers and mixing
- David Ivory & Cheek - mastering at Sigma Sound Services, Philadelphia, PA
- Hal Jay Greene, Jim Wood - executive producers
