= Live at Carnegie Hall (Renaissance album) =

- Cover art by Fred Marcellino

Live album by Renaissance
- Released: June 1976 (US)
- Recorded: June 20–22, 1975 with Record Plant Remote
- Venue: Carnegie Hall, New York City, New York
- Genre: Progressive rock
- Length: 103:16
- Label: BTM (UK); Sire (North America); RCA (Europe and Japan)
- Producer: Renaissance

Renaissance chronology
Scheherazade and Other Stories (1975)	Live at Carnegie Hall (1976)	Novella (1977)

Professional ratings
Review scores
Source	Rating
AllMusic	4/5 stars

Live at Carnegie Hall is a 1976 live double album by the English progressive rock band Renaissance. It presented songs from all of the band's Annie Haslam-era studio albums thus far, including the forthcoming (at the time of the concerts) Scheherazade and Other Stories.

== Expanded 2019 edition ==
In 2019 Esoteric Recordings announced a re-mastered and 3 CD expanded edition of the album which was released on 31 May 2019.

== Track listing ==
All songs by Michael Dunford and Betty Thatcher, except where noted.

Side A

1. "Prologue" (Dunford (Note: The original LP and CD releases mistakenly credit this track to Dunford-Thatcher.)) - 7:35
2. "Ocean Gypsy" - 7:48
3. "Can You Understand?" - 10:41

Side B

4. "Carpet of the Sun" - 4:15
5. "Running Hard" - 9:43
6. "Mother Russia" - 10:48

Side C

7. "Song of Scheherazade" - 28:50 (Note: This album does not list the parts of the suite or their individual writers, but simply credits the track to Camp-Dunford-Thatcher-Tout.)
  a. "Fanfare" (John Tout)
  b. "The Betrayal" (Jon Camp, Tout, Dunford)
  c. "The Sultan"
  d. "Love Theme" (Camp)
  e. "The Young Prince and Princess as told by Scheherazade"
  f. "Festival Preparations" (Camp, Tout, Dunford)
  g. "Fugue for the Sultan" (Tout)
  h. "The Festival"
  i. "Finale" (Camp, Tout, Dunford)

Side D

8. "Ashes Are Burning" - 23:50

=== Expanded edition ===
CD 1 - 2019 re-mastered & expanded edition
No.	Title	Writer(s)	Length
1.	"Prologue"	Michael Dunford	7:35
2.	"Ocean Gypsy"	Dunford, Betty Thatcher	7:55
3.	"Kiev" (Previously unreleased - as "Snow Fell in Kiev")	McCarty, Thatcher	8:09
4.	"Can You Understand?"	Dunford, Thatcher	10:20
5.	"Carpet of the Sun"	Dunford, Thatcher	4:15
6.	"Running Hard"	Dunford, Thatcher	9:43
7.	"Mother Russia"	Dunford, Thatcher	10:48

CD 2 - 2019 re-mastered & expanded edition
No.	Title	Length
1.	"Song of Scheherazade" a. "Fanfare" (John Tout) b. "The Betrayal" (Jon Camp, Tout, Dunford) c. "The Sultan" (Dunford, Thatcher) d. "Love Theme" (Camp) e. "The Young Prince and Princess as told by Scheherazade" (Dunford, Thatcher) f. "Festival Preparations" (Camp, Tout, Dunford) g. "Fugue for the Sultan" (Tout) h. "The Festival" (Dunford, Thatcher) i. "Finale" (Camp, Tout, Dunford)"	28:50
2.	"Ashes Are Burning"	23:50

CD 3 - 2019 re-mastered & expanded edition - BBC Radio One "In Concert" - 25 March 1976
No.	Title	Writer(s)	Length
1.	"Prologue" (BBC Radio One "In Concert" - 25 March 1976)	Michael Dunford	8:02
2.	"Running Hard" (BBC Radio One "In Concert" - 25 March 1976)	Dunford, Thatcher	10:13
3.	"Ocean Gypsy" (BBC Radio One "In Concert" - 25 March 1976)	Dunford, Betty Thatcher	5:46
4.	"Mother Russia" (BBC Radio One "In Concert" - 25 March 1976)	Dunford, Thatcher	10:25
5.	"Song of Scheherazade" a. "Fanfare" (John Tout) b. "The Betrayal" (Jon Camp, Tout, Dunford) c. "The Sultan" (Dunford, Thatcher) d. "Love Theme" (Camp) e. "The Young Prince and Princess as told by Scheherazade" (Dunford, Thatcher) f. "Festival Preparations" (Camp, Tout, Dunford) g. "Fugue for the Sultan" (Tout) h. "The Festival" (Dunford, Thatcher) i. "Finale" (Camp, Tout, Dunford)" (BBC Radio One "In Concert" - 25 March 1976)		25:30

== Personnel ==
=== Renaissance ===
- Annie Haslam – lead and backing vocals
- Michael Dunford – acoustic guitars, electric guitar, backing vocals
- John Tout – keyboards, backing vocals
- Jon Camp – bass, lead vocals on "The Sultan" and "Kiev", backing vocals
- Terence Sullivan – drums, backing vocals, percussion

=== Additional musicians ===
- New York Philharmonic and choir with Tony Cox, orchestra conductor

=== Production ===
- Carmine Rubino - recording engineer
- Dick Plant - mixing at De Lane Lea Studios, Wembley, UK
- Barry Kidd - mixing assistant
