= Grandine il vento =

Studio album by Renaissance
- Released: June 1, 2013
- Recorded: June 2012–January 2013
- Studio: Studio X, Ridgewood, New Jersey, USA
- Genre: Progressive rock
- Length: 54:16
- Label: Symphonic Rock Recordings; Red River Entertainment; Avalon Records (Japan)
- Producer: Rave Tesar, Annie Haslam, Kevin Culligan

Renaissance chronology
In the Land of the Rising Sun: Live in Japan 2001 (2002)	Grandine il vento (2013)	Symphony of Light (2014)

Grandine il vento is the 13th studio album by the English progressive rock band Renaissance, first released in 2013 and re-released as Symphony of Light in 2014. It was financed through a Kickstarter campaign.

== Background ==
After the band's split in 2002, the band reunited and performed in 2009. In November 2012, the band's guitarist and composer, Michael Dunford died from a cerebral haemorrhage. One month later, the band's vocalist, Annie Haslam stated that the band would continue to perform. In 2013, it was announced that the new guitarist of the band was Ryche Chlanda. In April 2013, the band released the album first on the internet, and then in a CD format. It was dedicated on the inside sleeve to Michael Dunford. The album cover features a painting by Annie Haslam. Two guests played on this album: John Wetton (who had performed with Renaissance in 1971) and Ian Anderson (of Jethro Tull). The Japanese bonus track, "Carpet of the Sun," was recorded at NEARfest Apocalypse in June 2012. The album was reissued 15 April 2014 by Red River Entertainment as Symphony of Light with three additional tracks. These included the remaining two tracks from the 2010 3-song EP The Mystic and the Muse (the title track was already included) and the new song "Renaissance Man" written in honour of Michael Dunford.

== Track listing ==
All songs by Michael Dunford and Annie Haslam, except "Carpet of the Sun" by Dunford/Betty Thatcher-Newsinger

1. "Symphony of Light" - 12:09
2. "Waterfall" - 4:44
3. "Grandine il vento" - 6:13
4. "Porcelain" - 6:41
5. "Cry to the World" - 5:44
6. "Air of Drama" - 5:21
7. "Blood Silver Like Moonlight" - 5:16
8. "The Mystic and the Muse" - 7:48
9. "Carpet of the Sun" (live) - 3:28 (Japan only)

== 2014 Re-release as Symphony of Light ==
Cover art from Symphony of Light Painting by Annie Haslam. © 2014 Annie Haslam

1. "Symphony of Light"
2. "Waterfall"
3. "Grandine il vento"
4. "Porcelain"
5. "Cry to the World"
6. "Air of Drama"
7. "Blood Silver Like Moonlight"
8. "The Mystic and the Muse"
9. "Tonight"
10. "Immortal Beloved"
11. "Renaissance Man"

All songs by Dunford/Haslam except 11 by Tesar/Haslam.

== Personnel ==
=== Renaissance ===
- Annie Haslam - lead and backing vocals, co-producer
- Michael Dunford - acoustic guitars, backing vocals, arrangements
- Rave Tesar - piano, keyboards, arrangements
- Jason Hart - keyboards, accordion, backing vocals, arrangements
- David J. Keyes - bass, double bass, backing vocals, 2nd lead vocal on track 6
- Frank Pagano - drums, percussion, backing vocals

=== Additional musicians ===
- Ian Anderson - flute on track 5
- John Wetton - vocals on track 7
- Tom Brislin - additional keyboards on track 8
- Andy Spiller - arrangements on track 8

=== Production ===
- Rave Tesar - producer, engineer, mixing and mastering
- Kevin Culligan - executive producer
