= Turn of the Cards =

- Cover design by Hipgnosis, tarot cards by Joe Petagno

Studio album by Renaissance
- Released: July 1974
- Recorded: 1974
- Studio: De Lane Lea Music Centre, Wembley, UK
- Genre: Progressive rock
- Length: 40:54
- Label: BTM; Sire; RCA
- Producer: Renaissance; Dick Plant; Richard Gottehrer

Renaissance chronology
Ashes Are Burning (1973)	Turn of the Cards (1974)	Scheherazade and Other Stories (1975)

Professional ratings
Review scores
Source	Rating
AllMusic	4.5/5 stars

Turn of the Cards is the fifth studio album by the English progressive rock band Renaissance, released in July 1974. It was the last Renaissance studio album to include excerpts from existing classical pieces. It was also the first album recorded by the group after Michael Dunford, who had written songs for their previous three albums, joined the group as an acoustic guitarist.

In the UK, this was the first release on Miles Copeland's fledgling label, BTM Records (British Talent Managers). In 1977, after releasing a total of 10 albums, including two more by Renaissance (Scheherazade and Other Stories and the double LP Live at Carnegie Hall), the label folded due to bankruptcy.

== Cover art ==
Hipgnosis, who had previously designed the covers to the band's albums Prologue and Ashes Are Burning, designed the cover. After producing a storyboard of ideas, they visited the recording studio to get a feel for the music, then produced the final artwork. The castle in the background is Warwick Castle. The first BTM UK pressings had an alternate back cover, with a close-up portrait of Annie Haslam framed in one of the 'cards'.

== Background and recording ==
For Turn of the Cards, Renaissance again made use of De Lane Lea Studios and co-producer/engineer Dick Plant. Richard Gottehrer, co-founder of Renaissance's new American record label Sire Records, is also credited as co-producer of the album, but according to drummer Terry Sullivan, Gottehrer never set foot inside De Lane Lea Studios and his sole involvement with the album was collaborating on the final remix of "Things I Don't Understand", which was done at Record Plant Studios in the U.S.

"Running Hard" quotes a melodic phrase first used in "Mr. Pine" from the Illusion album, as well as the piece "Litanies" by French composer Jehan Alain, both at keyboardist John Tout's suggestion.

In 1993, Betty Thatcher said that "I Think Of You" means that "you can love everybody, in every way, even the unlovable..."

"Things I Don't Understand" was founder member Jim McCarty's last released contribution to the band. However, it was an old Renaissance song; bassist/vocalist Jon Camp said that when he joined Renaissance back in 1972, it was already a part of the band's set list. Prologue was the last time McCarty actively wrote songs for Renaissance, rather than simply allowing them to use material he had already written.

"Things I Don't Understand" was a problematic track from the beginning. During the first take the band went into a spontaneous instrumental jam that they were all very pleased with, but after returning from a break they found that the tape op had accidentally erased the entire recording. The producers did numerous mixes of the song in a struggle to find a sound that everyone could be satisfied with.

In 1993, Betty Thatcher said that "Black Flame" (inspired by the Vietnam War) was about the human potential for wrongdoing: "We're all capable of doing [bad] things if we think it's right. And it might be wrong." Sullivan said he was present when Thatcher wrote the lyrics to "Black Flame", which she did while seated in a special writing chair in her house.

The music to "Cold Is Being" is taken from "Adagio in G minor" (attributed to Tomaso Albinoni, but actually composed by Remo Giazotto); it was credited in the back notes ("Thanks to Jehan Alain for the opening piece of RUNNING HARD and Albinoni for COLD IS BEING").

"Mother Russia" is cited by Jon Camp as being a case where he made major compositional contributions without being credited for them. Betty Thatcher wrote the lyrics, which are based on the famous novel One Day in the Life of Ivan Denisovich, before Renaissance had any music for the song, breaking from the band's usual pattern of only using Thatcher's lyrics when she wrote them for a piece of music they had given her.

Jimmy Horowitz did the orchestral arrangements on the album. Sullivan recalled, "He was a true gentleman and a total professional. His approach was to have a soft touch on the strings, which was exactly what we were looking for."

The album's title was inspired by the cover art Hipgnosis created.

Some credits on the original album were later inexplicably cropped: "Many thanks to Miles Copeland, Julian, Shirley" had originally read, "Many thanks to Miles Copeland, Julian, Shirley, Richard and Natalie Halem."

== Expanded 2020 edition ==
In 2019 Esoteric Recordings announced a re-mastered and 4 disc (3 CD plus 1 DVD-audio) expanded edition of the album which was released on 20 March 2020.

== Track listing ==
All tracks are written by Michael Dunford and Betty Thatcher, except where noted.

Side one
No.	Title	Writer(s)	Length
1.	"Running Hard"	Dunford, Thatcher (Note: The introduction to the song is borrowed from "Litanies" by Jehan Alain.)	9:37
2.	"I Think of You"		3:07
3.	"Things I Don't Understand"	Dunford, Jim McCarty	9:29

Side two
No.	Title	Writer(s)	Length
4.	"Black Flame"		6:23
5.	"Cold Is Being"	Dunford, Thatcher (Note: The music to this song taken from Adagio in G minor" by Remo Giazotto.)	3:00
6.	"Mother Russia"		9:18

=== Expanded edition ===
Bonus Tracks for 2020 re-mastered & expanded edition
No.	Title	Writer(s)	Length
7.	"Everybody Needs A Friend" (Previously unreleased - recorded De Lane Lea Studios, Wembley - 23 March 1974)	Andy Powell, Ted Turner, Martin Turner, Steve Upton
8.	"Mother Russia" (Single edit for a U.S.-only single - Previously unreleased on CD)
9.	"Things I Don't Understand" (New stereo mix)	Dunford, McCarty
10.	"Black Flame" (New stereo mix)
11.	"Mother Russia" (New stereo mix)

2020 re-issue Disc two - Live at the Academy of Music, 17 May 1974
No.	Title	Writer(s)	Length
1.	"Can You Understand"
2.	"Black Flame"
3.	"Carpet of the Sun"
4.	"Cold is Being"
5.	"Things I Don't Understand"	Dunford, McCarty
6.	"Running Hard"

2020 re-issue Disc three - Live at the Academy of Music, 17 May 1974
No.	Title	Writer(s)	Length
1.	"Ashes Are Burning"
2.	"Mother Russia"
3.	"Prologue"	Dunford (Note: This release credits Annie Haslam as co-writer. Earlier releases of the song credit either Dunford alone or Dunford and Thatcher.)

2020 re-issue Disc four - "Turn of the Cards" 5.1 Surround sound & High-resolution stereo mixes
No.	Title	Writer(s)	Length
1.	"Running Hard"	Dunford, Thatcher (Note: The introduction to the song is borrowed from "Litanies" by Jehan Alain.)
2.	"I Think of You"	Michael Dunford and Betty Thatcher
3.	"Things I Don't Understand"	Dunford, Jim McCarty
4.	"Black Flame"	Michael Dunford and Betty Thatcher
5.	"Cold Is Being"	Dunford, Thatcher (Note: The music to this song taken from Adagio in G minor" by Remo Giazotto.)
6.	"Mother Russia"	Michael Dunford and Betty Thatcher

== Personnel ==
=== Renaissance ===
- Annie Haslam – lead and backing vocals
- Michael Dunford – acoustic guitar, backing vocals
- Jon Camp (listed as "John Camp") – bass, co-lead vocals on track 3, backing vocals
- John Tout – keyboards, backing vocals
- Terence Sullivan – drums, backing vocals, percussion

=== Additional musicians ===
- Jimmy Horowitz – orchestral arrangements

=== Production ===
- Dick Plant - producer, engineer
- Richard Gottehrer - producer
- Douglas Bogie, Mike Pela - assistant engineers
- Jeffrey Lesser - remix engineer at Mediasound Studios, New York
- Hipgnosis - cover design
