= Prologue (Renaissance album) =

- Cover design by Hipgnosis

Studio album by Renaissance
- Released: October 1972
- Recorded: June–July 1972
- Studio: Nova Sound (London)
- Genre: Progressive rock
- Length: 41:03
- Label: Sovereign
- Producers: Miles Copeland; Renaissance

Renaissance chronology
Illusion (1971)	Prologue (1972)	Ashes Are Burning (1973)

Professional ratings
Review scores
Source	Rating
AllMusic	4/5 stars

Prologue is the third studio album by the English progressive rock band Renaissance, released in October 1972.

== Overview ==
In 1972, Renaissance's then-new management disbanded the then current line-up (one of several short-lived transitional line-ups), retaining only ex-The Gentle People singer Annie Haslam and former Rupert's People keyboard player John Tout to build a new band around. The new members added at this point were bassist Jon Camp, drummer Terence Sullivan and guitarist Mick Parsons. Shortly thereafter, Parsons died in a car accident. Electric guitarist Rob Hendry was brought in at the last minute to replace him for the recording sessions of June and July 1972, and left the band soon after the album was completed.

Because Prologue was a new start for the band, with a line-up that now included none of the original members, it would frequently be referred to as their "first" album (for example, on the Live at Carnegie Hall album, both in a song intro and on the inside cover).

Though all the songs are Renaissance originals, they were not written by any current members of the band but by former members Jim McCarty (from the first line-up) and Michael Dunford (ex-Nashville Teens, from the transitional line-ups), along with lyricist Betty Thatcher. Dunford would become part of the band again after Hendry's departure, but was not officially a band member during the recording of Ashes Are Burning in 1973.

As was common for the genre—and Renaissance especially—this album featured quotations from Classical music. The title track uses Chopin's "Revolutionary" from 12 Études, Op. 10. On the second track, "Kiev," the band references Rachmaninoff's Prelude in C Sharp Minor.

== In The Beginning reissue ==
In 1978 Prologue was reissued, together with the following album Ashes Are Burning, as a double album called In the Beginning (Capitol Records, USA). The original double LP with gatefold sleeve included the complete Prologue, but one song from Ashes was edited. The 1988 CD version of In the Beginning (on one disc) had edited versions of "Rajah Khan" and of two songs from Ashes Are Burning. Prologue was re-issued on CD in its original form by Repertoire Records in 1995.

== 2018 expanded edition ==
In 2018 Esoteric Recordings announced a re-mastered and expanded edition of the first Haslam era album which was released on the 28 September 2018.

== Track listing ==
Side one
No.	Title	Writer(s)	Length
1.	"Prologue"	Michael Dunford (Note: The introduction to the song is borrowed from the beginning of Frédéric Chopin's Revolutionary Etude.)	5:39
2.	"Kiev"	Jim McCarty, Betty Thatcher	7:39
3.	"Sounds of the Sea"	Dunford, Thatcher	7:09

Side two
No.	Title	Writer(s)	Length
4.	"Spare Some Love"	Dunford, Thatcher	5:05
5.	"Bound for Infinity"	McCarty, Thatcher	4:17
6.	"Rajah Khan"	Dunford	11:14

=== Additional tracks ===
Bonus Track for 2018 re-mastered & expanded edition
No.	Title	Length
7.	"Spare Some Love" (Single Version - previously unreleased on CD)

== Personnel ==
Credits are adapted from the album's liner notes.

- Annie Haslam - lead vocals (all except track 2), backing vocals, percussion
- Rob Hendry - electric and acoustic guitars, mandolin, chimes, backing vocals
- John Tout - acoustic and electric keyboards, backing vocals, arrangements
- Jon Camp (listed as "John Camp") - electric bass guitar, lead vocals (track 2), backing vocals, tampoura, arrangements (uncredited)
- Terence Sullivan - drums, percussion
- Michael Dunford - arrangements, Music (1, 3, 4, 6)

=== Additional musicians ===
- Francis Monkman - VCS3 synthesizer solo on track 6

=== Production ===
- Miles Copeland - producer, live photos
- Mike Weighell, Mick Glossop - engineers
- Hipgnosis and Ronchetti & Day - cover art
