= A Song for All Seasons =

- Cover design by Hipgnosis

Studio album by Renaissance
- Released: 3 March 1978
- Recorded: November 1977 – January 1978
- Studios: Advision, CTS and Trident Studios, London
- Genre: Progressive rock
- Length: 44:31
- Labels: Warner Bros. (UK); Sire (North America)
- Producer: David Hentschel

Renaissance chronology
Novella (1977)	A Song for All Seasons (1978)	Azure d'Or (1979)

Singles from A Song for All Seasons
- 1. "Back Home Once Again" Released: 16 September 1977; 2. "Northern Lights" Released: 26 May 1978

Professional ratings
Review scores
Source	Rating
AllMusic	4/5 stars

A Song for All Seasons is the eighth studio album by the English progressive rock band Renaissance, released in 1978. It marked the return of electric guitars to the band's music after several years of absence. "Northern Lights" from the album reached the top ten on the UK Singles Chart and is the band's only UK chart single.

== Overview ==
A shortened recording of "Back Home Once Again" was used as the theme song for the short-lived 1977 British TV series The Paper Lads.

"She Is Love", sung by Jon Camp, was meant to be sung by Annie Haslam, but the orchestral backing track turned out to have been recorded in the wrong key for her.

"Kindness (At the End)" is both written and sung by Jon Camp.

Drummer Terry Sullivan had his first songwriting credit with the band on the title track. He was responsible for the basic tune to the song's extended instrumental intro. This was based on a song he wrote on guitar in 1971.

== Expanded 2019 edition ==
In 2019 Esoteric Recordings announced a re-mastered and 3 CD expanded edition of the album which was released on 29 March 2019.

== Track listing ==
Side one
No.	Title	Writer(s)	Length
1.	"Opening Out"	Jon Camp, Michael Dunford	4:14
2.	"Day of the Dreamer"	Camp, Dunford	9:43
3.	"Closer than Yesterday"	Camp, Dunford	3:18
4.	"Kindness (At the End)"	Camp	4:51

Side two
No.	Title	Writer(s)	Length
5.	"Back Home Once Again"	Camp, Dunford	3:15
6.	"She Is Love"	Dunford, Betty Thatcher	4:11
7.	"Northern Lights"	Dunford, Thatcher	4:06
8.	"A Song for All Seasons"	Camp, Dunford, Terence Sullivan, Thatcher, John Tout	10:53

Bonus Tracks for 2019 re-mastered & expanded edition
No.	Title	Writer(s)	Length
9.	"Northern Lights" (Promotional single edit - previously unreleased on CD)	Dunford, Thatcher
10.	"Day of the Dreamer" (BBC Radio One session - 19 August 1978)	Camp, Dunford
11.	"Midas Man" (BBC Radio One session - 19 August 1978)
12.	"The Vultures Fly High" (BBC Radio One session - 19 August 1978)
13.	"Northern Lights" (Top of the Pops version - previously unreleased)	Dunford, Thatcher

2019 re-issue Disc two - Live at the Tower Theater, Philadelphia, 12 April 1978
No.	Title	Length
1.	"Can You Hear Me"
2.	"Carpet of the Sun"
3.	"Things I Don't Understand"
4.	"Opening Out" (Previously unreleased)
5.	"Day of the Dreamer"
6.	"Midas Man"

2019 re-issue Disc three - Live at the Tower Theater, Philadelphia, 12 April 1978
No.	Title	Length
1.	"Northern Lights"
2.	"A Song for All Seasons" (Previously unreleased)
3.	"Touching Once is So Hard to Keep" (Previously unreleased)
4.	"Ashes Are Burning" (Previously unreleased)

== Personnel ==
=== Renaissance ===
- Annie Haslam – lead vocals on tracks 1–3, 5, 7, 8
- Michael Dunford – 6 & 12-string acoustic guitars, electric guitar
- John Tout – keyboards
- Jon Camp – bass, bass pedals, electric guitar, lead vocals on tracks 4 and 6
- Terence Sullivan – drums, percussion

=== Additional musicians ===
- Royal Philharmonic Orchestra
- Harry Rabinowitz – conductor, arrangements on track 6
- Louis Clark – orchestral arrangements

=== Production ===
- David Hentschel – producer, engineer
- Barry Kidd, Declan O'Doherty, Dick Plant, Steve Short – assistant engineers
- Hipgnosis – album cover design

== Charts ==
=== Album ===
Year	Chart	Position
1978	UK Albums Chart	35
1978	RPM100 Albums (Canada)	45
1978	Billboard 200 (USA)	58

=== Singles ===
Year	Single	Chart	Position
1978	"Northern Lights"	UK Singles Chart	10

== Certifications ==
Country	Organization	Year	Sales
UK	BPI	1979	Silver (+ 60,000)
