= Camera Camera (Renaissance album) =

Studio album by Renaissance
- Released: October 1981
- Recorded: June 1981
- Studio: Herne Place Studios, Sunningdale, Berkshire, England
- Genre: Progressive rock, new wave
- Length: 45:01
- Label: Illegal (UK); I.R.S. (US); RCA (Italy); Line (Germany)
- Producer: Renaissance

Renaissance chronology
Azure d'Or (1979)	Camera Camera (1981)	Time-Line (1983)

Singles from Camera Camera
- 1. "Faeries (Living at the Bottom of the Garden)" Released: 2 October 1981; 2. "Bonjour Swansong" Released: 12 February 1982

Professional ratings
Review scores
Source	Rating
AllMusic	3.5/5 stars

Camera Camera is the tenth studio album by the English progressive rock band Renaissance, released in 1981.

After losing two of their five members and being dropped from their label, Renaissance signed on to Miles Copeland's I.R.S. Records. The departed members were replaced by keyboardist/singer Peter Gosling and drummer Peter Barron (neither of whom is included in the album's band photos). Between the previous Renaissance album and Camera Camera, Annie Haslam and Michael Dunford had worked with Gosling as a trio called Nevada, releasing two singles and recording several demos. Nevada's somewhat new wave sound strongly influenced Camera Camera. One of the Camera Camera songs, "Faeries", had previously been recorded (but not released) by Nevada.

The original 1981 UK release of Camera Camera did not include the single "Bonjour Swansong"; but the song has been included on all releases of the album since 1982.

This was the last Renaissance studio album to include lyrics by the band's longtime lyricist Betty Thatcher. She wrote the words to "Bonjour Swansong" as "a private goodbye to the group."

== Track listing ==
Side one
No.	Title	Writer(s)	Length
1.	"Camera Camera"	Jon Camp, Michael Dunford	6:01
2.	"Faeries (Living at the Bottom of the Garden)"	Dunford, Peter Gosling	3:45
3.	"Remember"	Dunford, Betty Thatcher	4:33
4.	"Bonjour Swansong" (not included in the British 1981 release)	Dunford, Thatcher	3:32
5.	"Tyrant-Tula"	Camp, Dunford	5:58

Side two
No.	Title	Writer(s)	Length
6.	"Okichi-San"	Dunford, Thatcher	6:00
7.	"Jigsaw"	Dunford, Thatcher	5:00
8.	"Running Away from You"	Camp	3:35
9.	"Ukraine Ways"	Camp, Dunford	6:37

== Personnel ==
Renaissance

- Annie Haslam - lead and backing vocals
- Michael Dunford - guitars, backing vocals
- Peter Gosling - keyboards, backing vocals
- Jon Camp - bass, backing vocals, guitars
- Peter Barron - drums, backing vocals, percussion

Production

- John Acock - engineer
