= Michael Dunford (musician) =

English guitarist (1944-2012)

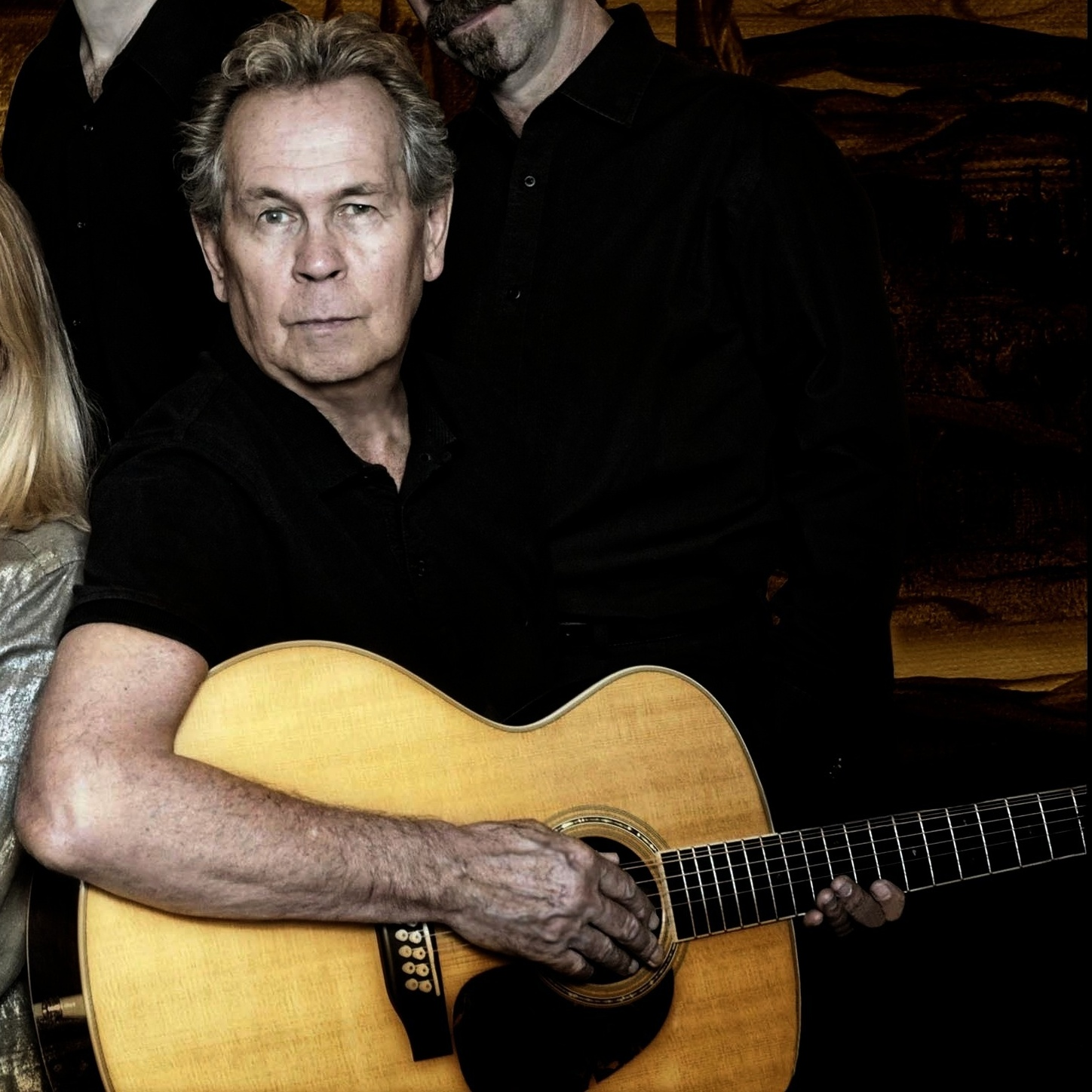
- Dunford in 2012

Background information
- Born: 8 July 1944; Surrey, England, UK
- Died: 20 November 2012 (aged 68) Surrey, England, UK
- Genres: Progressive rock
- Occupations: Musician, songwriter
- Instrument: Guitar
- Years active: 1962–2012
- Formerly of: The Nashville Teens, Renaissance

Michael Dunford (8 July 1944 – 20 November 2012) was an English rock guitarist and songwriter. He was best known for being the guitarist for Renaissance from 1970 until his death in 2012.

== Early life ==
Dunford was born in Surrey in 1944. His first job was selling clothing in a local shop, then later working at Heathrow Airport.

== Career ==
Dunford was in The Nashville Teens from 1962 to 1963, leaving shortly before they released their biggest hit "Tobacco Road". In 1970, Dunford replaced Keith Relf in Renaissance. Former Renaissance member Jim McCarty, who was a friend of Dunford, told him to carry on the band and recruit new members, and would hire an entirely new lineup of the band, including singer Annie Haslam and keyboardist John Hawken, the latter he had worked with in the Nashville Teens.

Michael first left Renaissance in June 1972, missing out on their album Prologue, although he is credited for arranging the album.

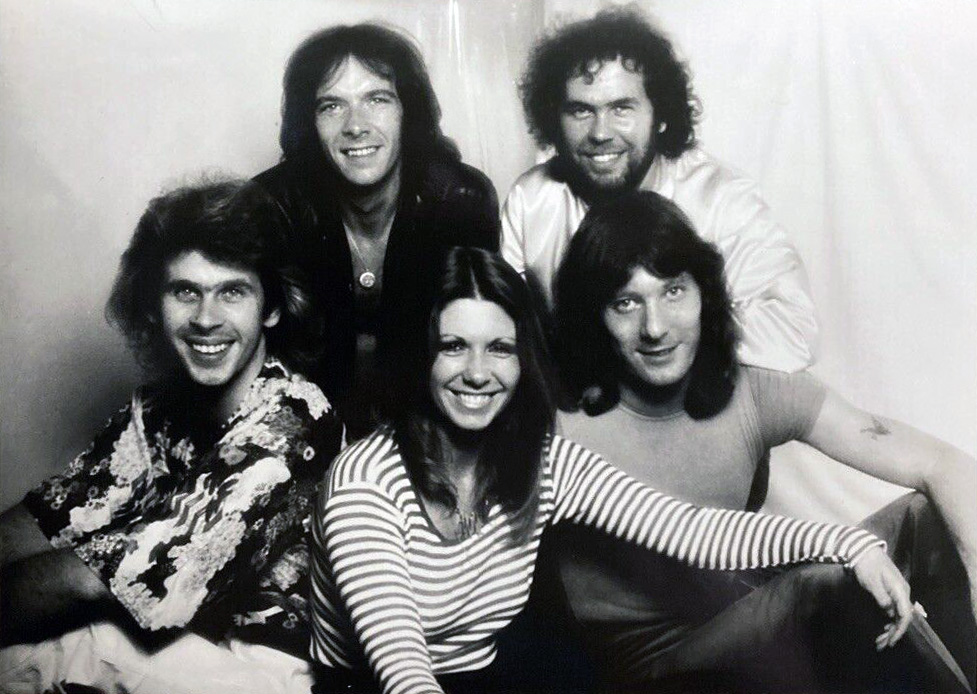
Renaissance in 1979: Michael Dunford sits at the top right

He returned to Renaissance in 1974, completing what most fans regard as the classic five-piece line-up, which would remain together through five studio albums. Dunford would also appear on the albums Camera Camera (1981) and Time-Line (1983), both of which were recorded by a three-piece Renaissance following the departures of keyboardist John Tout and drummer Terry Sullivan.

In the 1980s, he formed Nevada with Haslam, and had a minor hit in 1983 with "In the Bleak Midwinter". Dunford co-wrote the theme song for the television show The Paper Lads with Renaissance bassist Jon Camp. Dunford and Camp were the main songwriting duo for the band.

In 1994, he formed "Michael Dunford's Renaissance" after meeting jazz singer Stephanie Adlington. They toured for four years, ending when the real Renaissance was reformed.

== Death ==
Dunford died on 20 November 2012, aged 68. He was said to have suffered a massive cerebral hemorrhage while dining at his home in Surrey. He was rushed to hospital, where he died surrounded by his family without having regained consciousness. A few days before his death, he had returned home after a North American tour.

At the time of his death, Michael was married to Clare Dunford, and had two children, aged ten and thirteen. His funeral was held at Woking Crematorium.

== Discography ==
Renaissance

- Illusion (1971)
- Prologue (1972; credited as arranger)
- Ashes Are Burning (1973)
- Turn of the Cards (1974)
- Scheherazade and Other Stories (1975)
- Novella (1977)
- A Song for All Seasons (1978)
- Azure d'Or (1979)
- Camera Camera (1981)
- Time-Line (1983)
- Tuscany (2001)
- Grandine il vento (2013; released after his death)

Other

Unless noted, Dunford was a composer on these albums

- Fortune His Sleep — Faith & Disease — 1994
- Out of the Mist/Illusion — Illusion — 1994
- Blessing in Disguise — Annie Haslam — 1995
- Face of Rock — Vouts — credited as drummer/percussionist — 1996
- Livesongs: Third Body — Faith & Disease — 1996
- Out with a Vout — Vouts — 1996
- Sin Cigarros — Kenny Chambers — credited as drummer/percussionist — 1996
- Motorbaby — Motorbaby — 1997
- Ocean Gypsy — Michael Dunford's Renaissance — credited as composer and performer: Guitars, accordion, piano, keyboards, vocals — 1997
- Live Under Brazilian Skies — Annie Haslam — 1998
- Shadow of the Moon — Blackmore's Night — 1998
- Melvyn Flynt — Da Hustler — Noreaga Track 7 contains a re-play of "Can You Understand", written by Dunford and Betty Thatcher — 1999
- Pictures in — Nevada — 2000
- The Dawn Of Ananda — Annie Haslam — 2000
- Minstrels and Ballads — Blackmore's Night — 2001
- Live Studio Concert Philadelphia 1997 — Annie Haslam — 2006
- A Complete Collection 1969—1995 — Jane Relf credited as a composer and performer: Guitars — 2008
- Green Fields — The Beverley Sisters — 2008
