= Betty Thatcher =

- Also known as: Betty Thatcher
- Born: Betty Mary Newsinger; 16 February 1944; Westminster, London, England
- Died: 15 August 2011 (aged 67) Hayle, Cornwall, England
- Occupations: Writer, lyricist
- Years active: 1969–2011

Betty Newsinger (16 February 1944 – 15 August 2011), known for much of her career as Betty Thatcher, was an English lyricist who wrote many of the lyrics for the progressive rock band Renaissance.

== Early life ==
Betty Mary Newsinger was born in Great Titchfield Street, central London. She was taught to read newspapers at home, started conventional school at the age of eight, and became a fast and prolific reader. After passing the Eleven-plus exam, she won a scholarship to a grammar school, where she refused to take part in any examinations. After two years excelling in English and art, she transferred to a school that accepted difficult students.

== Career ==
Thatcher's friend Liz Kellett introduced her to Kellett's school friend Jane Relf, the younger sister of ex-Yardbirds singer Keith Relf. When Keith and Jane formed Renaissance, they asked her to be the lyricist, Relf having read Thatcher's letters to Jane. When Betty moved to St Ives, Cornwall, she sent her lyrics from there to Jim McCarty who would write songs around them, including "Love Is All" and "Past Orbits of Dust" from the album Illusion, produced by Paul Samwell-Smith and released in Germany in 1971, but not released in the UK until 1976.

After many personnel changes, the Renaissance lineup finally stabilised from 1972 to 1980, featuring Annie Haslam (vocals), John Tout (keyboards), Michael Dunford (guitar), Jon Camp (bass guitar/vocals) and Terence Sullivan (drums). Dunford sent tapes of his compositions to her when it was inconvenient to play through his ideas in person and said that "she writes amazingly quickly... three days later I get these stunning lyrics back in the post!"

During this period, Thatcher wrote most of the band's lyrics for the studio albums Prologue (1972), Ashes Are Burning (1973), Turn of the Cards (1974), Scheherazade and Other Stories (1975), Novella (1977), A Song for All Seasons (1978) and Azure d'Or (1979). She wrote the lyrics to their 1978 UK top 10 hit single "Northern Lights". Her lyrics for the 1981 album Camera Camera were her final contributions to the band, other than a few lyrics written several years later. (Note: Her only Renaissance lyrics after 1981 were those for four demos that were recorded in about 1986. These remained unreleased until they appeared as bonus tracks on the 2000 CD Pictures in the Fire, a collection of tracks recorded in the early 1980s by Renaissance offshoot Nevada.) She wrote the words to the Camera Camera track "Bonjour Swansong" as "a private goodbye to the group."

In 1973, McCarty formed the group Shoot, whose only album, On the Frontier, featured the McCarty/Thatcher-composed title track that Renaissance recorded for Ashes Are Burning (1973).

During the 1970s, Thatcher wrote English lyrics for German and Spanish hits. In 1985, she wrote the lyrics to Annie Haslam's Still Life album, which was recorded with Louis Clark and the Royal Philharmonic Orchestra. Thatcher and Clark also recorded an album entitled The Life of Dorian Gray, which was never released. She contributed lyrics to the Don Airey's 1989 album K2. In 1998, Thatcher wrote the words for a Japanese commercial for Nikka Whiskey which won five awards.

In 1994, Thatcher wrote the lyrics for the album The Other Woman by Michael Dunford's Renaissance, which featured singer Stephanie Adlington. These were written "during the painful period when a relationship was coming to an end... during which I was unable to speak, so I tried to put some of my feelings to song".

In 2004, Thatcher wrote lyrics for the album South of Winter by Terry Sullivan's group Renaissant, which featured John Tout on keyboards, Sullivan's wife Christine on most of the vocals and Sullivan singing lead on two songs.

== About the lyrics ==
John Tout described Thatcher's lyrics as "reclusive, almost. They're not drawn from the normal sort of thing that people write about in a rock band", and Jon Camp opined, "What she's written has always been correct for the group. It fits very well with what we've tried to do musically."

"Carpet of the Sun" conveys Thatcher's "joy of being alive, and seeing the grass grow", and "Ashes Are Burning" relates "a near death experience." "Running Hard" tells of "a long dark cliff path, that if you miss the last bus from Hayle to St. Ives, you have to walk...the sea's at one side of you and there's a train the other side...the trees looked like webs and the stars and the moon looked like mirrors." "I Think of You" conveys how "you can love everybody, in every way, even the unlovable." “Black Flame” (inspired by the Vietnam War) considers the human potential for wrongdoing: Thatcher observes that “We're all capable of doing [bad] things if we think it's right. And it might be wrong.”

"Mother Russia" was inspired by Alexander Solzhenitsyn's book One Day in the Life of Ivan Denisovich. About "Ocean Gypsy" Thatcher "always thought the sun was the man and the moon was the woman...it's like they're lovers and they never really meet." "The Vultures Fly High" was "actually written for Wishbone Ash and it had even darker words...so I tried to make it a little lighter." Thatcher said she "always regretted writing 'Sounds of the Sea' because I felt that it was such a personal thing...every time I heard it for the first five years I cringed and thought, oh my God, everyone can see into my brain." Interpretations of "Can You Hear Me?" vary; Annie Haslam felt it was "about the city and people", while Jon Camp said that "It's about people hiding behind their social facades, I think ... people are never actually saying what they mean, never meaning what they say." Thatcher herself has declined to explain "Can You Hear Me?", preferring that each listener view it through their own individual understanding.

== Personal life ==
In 1972, she married at the Kensington and Chelsea Register Office and became Betty Brown. The marriage ended in divorce in 1976. In the 1980s she changed her name back to Newsinger.

She was a private person and lived most of her life in St. Ives and then in Hayle.

In her late years she suffered from emphysema. She died of lung cancer on 15 August 2011, in Hayle.
