= Scheherazade and Other Stories =

- Cover design by Hipgnosis

Studio album by Renaissance
- Released: July 1975
- Recorded: May 1975
- Studio: Abbey Road Studios, London, UK
- Genre: Progressive rock
- Length: 45:39
- Label: BTM (UK); Sire (North America); RCA (Europe and Japan)
- Producer: David Hitchcock and Renaissance

Renaissance chronology
Turn of the Cards (1974)	Scheherazade and Other Stories (1975)	Live at Carnegie Hall (1976)

Scheherazade and Other Stories is the sixth studio album by the English progressive rock band Renaissance, released in 1975. Some critics consider it their best album, although others prefer earlier albums. This is the first album in which Renaissance (the Jon Camp/Annie Haslam/Terence Sullivan/John Tout version) did not use quotes from actual classical pieces and the first not to feature any songwriting credits from the original members. Contrary to popular belief, "Song of Scheherazade" is not based on Nikolai Rimsky-Korsakov's Scheherazade, but does have a brief recurring motif that alludes to that work.

== Background and recording ==
The suite "Song of Scheherazade", which occupies most of the album's running time, was originally conceived by Renaissance guitarist Michael Dunford as the score for a theatrical musical. He and bassist Jon Camp would work on the musical during lulls in their Renaissance songwriting sessions at Dunford's house in Windlesham. Eventually Renaissance decided to use an abridged form of the planned musical for the second side of their next album, and keyboardist John Tout joined in on songwriting sessions for the piece at Renaissance's usual rehearsal hall in Longcross. Since vocalist Annie Haslam had no songwriting role in the band, during these sessions she would simply sit and listen with a cup of tea and a packet of crisps.

Renaissance's first choice to produce the album was David Hentschel, but he was unavailable. They took David Hitchcock as their second choice because they were impressed with his work on In the Land of Grey and Pink, and because he and Renaissance were both being managed by Miles Copeland III. Though Hitchcock and Renaissance got along well, both parties later remarked that they never creatively gelled during the recording sessions, and that the album would probably have turned out better with Hentschel producing. Moreover, for a stretch of several days Hitchcock was simultaneously producing Scheherazade and Other Stories and Cunning Stunts, so that he would have to work on Cunning Stunts at Tollington Park Studios during the day and on Scheherazade and Other Stories at Abbey Road Studios at night, an arrangement which Hitchcock felt negatively impacted both albums.

Though the entire album is credited as being recorded at Abbey Road Studios, both Haslam and drummer Terrance Sullivan have maintained that the band recorded the track "The Vultures Fly High" at Air Studios in Central London before going to Abbey Road to record the rest of the album. The London Symphony Orchestra recorded their parts for the album in Studio 1, while most of Renaissance's parts were recorded in Studio 3.

"Trip to the Fair" was inspired by Annie Haslam's first date with Roy Wood. Haslam recounted, "As we drove up to Hampstead to drop me off, we remembered the fairground had come to Hampstead Heath, I think it was Easter, so we all got excited about that. It would be a perfect ending to a wonderful dinner and first date. Sadly, on arrival it was closed down for the night, all in darkness. ... The next day, as planned, I called Betty Thatcher, my friend and our lyricist, to tell her about my date with Roy, including going to the fair and that no one was there." While recording the song, Haslam kept making the same mistake at the same part of the song, prompting her to break into laughter each time. The other members of the band came up with the idea of dubbing together all the different laughter takes in a staggered form, resulting in the madcap laughter on the track.

The song "The Vultures Fly High" was written about the negative treatment Renaissance received from music critics.

"Ocean Gypsy" has since been covered by Blackmore's Night.

For most of the album's production, the planned title was simply Scheherazade; appending "and Other Stories" was a last minute decision.

== Cover art ==
The cover art was designed by Hipgnosis, who were planning to do a series of paintings around the theme arranged into a tapestry. However, the painter died after completing just one painting in the series, so this was used as the cover.

== Song content ==
There is confusion over where the sections of "Song of Scheherazade" begin and end. This was caused by the fact that "Fanfare" and "The Betrayal" together sound like a single section, while "Festival Preparations" has two distinct parts of its own (4:00 and 1:11 in length). This confusion was reflected in the packaging and labels of original LP copies of this album, and in the mis-titling of "Festival Preparations" (part 1) as "The Young Prince and Princess" on the 1990 Tales of 1001 Nights, Volume I compilation.

Also, as has been admitted by the administrators of the official Renaissance site, Northern Lights, assigning exact composing credits to the individual sections is difficult, since the composers borrowed themes from each other. For example, based on the official credits, which differ slightly between the actual album package and the official Renaissance site, a particular melodic phrase ends up being attributed to both Dunford ("The Sultan") and Tout ("Fugue for the Sultan"); lyricist Betty Thatcher is not credited for her lyrics on "Finale" (which are repeated from "The Sultan").

== Reception ==
Professional ratings
Review scores
Source	Rating
AllMusic	4.5/5 stars

In a retrospective review, Bruce Eder of Allmusic summarized that "This album was the group's magnum opus in the perception of many onlookers and fans, and it still plays well, though its flaws are more evident than they were at the time." He described "Song of Scheherazade" as having a strong continuity throughout the work and a number of genuinely beautiful and powerful passages, but also as being pretentious and repetitive, and judged the other three songs on the album as more completely successful.

== Track listing ==
Side one

1. "Trip to the Fair" (Michael Dunford, Betty Thatcher, John Tout) (Note: Official songwriting credits for "Trip to the Fair" are inconsistent. The back cover and label of the original album both credit Michael Dunford, Betty Thatcher, and John Tout, but the inner sleeve and BMI records (see BMI Work #2014030) both credit only Dunford and Thatcher.) - 10:50
2. "The Vultures Fly High" (Dunford, Thatcher) - 3:07
3. "Ocean Gypsy" (Dunford, Thatcher) - 7:06

Side two

4. "Song of Scheherazade" - 24:38
  a. "Fanfare" (Tout) - 0:38
  b. "The Betrayal" (Jon Camp, Dunford, Tout) - 2:05
  c. "The Sultan" (Dunford, Thatcher) - 4:45
  d. "Love Theme" (Camp) - 2:42
  e. "The Young Prince and Princess as told by Scheherazade" (Dunford, Thatcher) - 2:29
  f. "Festival Preparations" (Camp, Dunford, Tout) - 5:10
  g. "Fugue for the Sultan" (Tout) - 2:10
  h. "The Festival" (Dunford, Thatcher) - 2:10
  i. "Finale" (Camp, Dunford, Tout) - 2:29

== Personnel ==
=== Renaissance ===
- Annie Haslam – lead and backing vocals
- Michael Dunford – acoustic guitars, backing vocals
- John Tout – keyboards, backing vocals
- Jon Camp – bass, bass pedals, lead vocals on track 4c, backing vocals
- Terence Sullivan – drums, percussion, backing vocals

=== Additional musicians ===
- Tony Cox : orchestral arrangements
- London Symphony Orchestra : orchestrations

=== Production ===
- David Hitchcock - producer
- John Kurlander - engineer
- Patrick Stapley - assistant engineer
- Hipgnosis - cover design
- W.T. (Terry) Penman - keyboards/stage manager
