= Time-Line =

Studio album by Renaissance
- Released: April 1983
- Recorded: July–August 1982
- Studios: Herne Place Studios, Sunningdale, Berkshire, England
- Genre: Pop rock
- Length: 41:54
- Label: Illegal / I.R.S.
- Producer: Renaissance

Renaissance chronology
Camera Camera (1981)	Time-Line (1983)	Tuscany (2001)

Time-Line the eleventh studio album by the English progressive rock band Renaissance, released in April 1983. It was the last album released by Renaissance before they disbanded in 1987.

With this album, Renaissance departed from their signature sound and toward 1980s pop, a change which had begun on their previous album, Camera Camera. It was a commercial failure and received the worst reviews of the band's career. It was followed by a band hiatus of 11 years.

While Camera Camera's sound was influenced by the band members who had played as Nevada (Annie Haslam and Michael Dunford, along with keyboardist Peter Gosling), on Time-Line Jon Camp took charge of the musical tone and direction. He wrote all the lyrics, strongly influenced the musical style, and went so far as to call this the band's "best album."

== Reception ==
Professional ratings
Review scores
Source	Rating
AllMusic	2.5/5 stars

In a retrospective review, Allmusic called Time-Line "the same kind of new wave-prog hybrid as Camera Camera, with anachronistic -- but irresistible -- little numbers like 'Richard the IX'" and "An enjoyably peppy record."

== Track listing ==
All tracks are written by Jon Camp and Michael Dunford, except where noted.

Side one
No.	Title	Lead vocals	Length
1.	"Flight"	Annie Haslam and Camp	4:09
2.	"Missing Persons" (Camp)	Haslam	3:36
3.	"Chagrin Boulevard"	Haslam and Camp	4:23
4.	"Richard IX" (Camp)	Haslam	3:40
5.	"The Entertainer"	Haslam	4:45

Side two
No.	Title	Lead vocals	Length
6.	"Electric Avenue"	Haslam and Camp	4:57
7.	"Majik"	Haslam	3:10
8.	"Distant Horizons" (Camp)	Haslam	3:58
9.	"Orient Express" (Camp)	Haslam	3:55
10.	"Auto-Tech"	Camp	5:21

== Personnel ==
=== Renaissance ===
- Annie Haslam - lead and backing vocals
- Jon Camp - bass, backing, co-lead and lead vocals, guitars
- Michael Dunford - guitars, backing vocals

=== Additional musicians ===
- Peter Gosling, Nick Magnus, Eddie Hardin - keyboards
- Peter Barron, Ian Mosley - drums
- Bimbo Acock - saxophone
- Dave Thomson - trumpet

=== Production ===
- John Acock - engineer
- Kevin Metcalfe - mastering at Utopia Studios, London
