= The Paper Lads =

British children's TV series (1977–1979)

- Written by: Ian Cullen
- Directed by: Derek Martinus
- Starring: Tony Neilson; John Bowler; Andrew Edwards; Peter Younger; Glynn Edwards; Anne Jameson
- Theme music composer: Jon Camp; Michael Dunford
- Opening theme: "Back Home Once Again" performed by Renaissance
- Country of origin: United Kingdom
- Original language: English
- No. of series: 2
- No. of episodes: 14

Production
- Producer: John K Cooper
- Production company: Tyne Tees Television

Original release
- Network: ITV
- Release: 24 August 1977 – 22 January 1979

The Paper Lads is a children's television series produced by Tyne Tees Television and broadcast nationally on ITV from 24 August 1977 to 22 January 1979. It was set in the northern industrial city of Newcastle upon Tyne, although much of the series was filmed in Gateshead, and recounted the adventures of a group of newspaper delivery boys and a girl.

There were two series made, each of seven episodes. William Corlett's four scripts for the series won him the Writer's Guild Award for Best Children's Writer.

The signature tune of the series, "Back Home Once Again", was performed by progressive rock band Renaissance, and it appears (re-recorded) as a full-length song on their 1978 album A Song for All Seasons.

The full series was released on DVD by Network in July 2013.

Two novels by William Humble based on the series were released by children's paperback publisher Target Books.
