= Azure d'Or =

Studio album by Renaissance
- Released: May 1979
- Recorded: November 1978 – February 1979
- Studio: Maison Rouge Studios, London
- Genre: Progressive rock
- Length: 42:55
- Label: Warner Bros. (UK); Sire (North America)
- Producer: David Hentschel

Renaissance chronology
A Song for All Seasons (1978)	Azure d'Or (1979)	Camera Camera (1981)

Singles from Azure d'Or
- 1. "The Winter Tree" Released: 20 April 1979; 2. "Jekyll and Hyde" Released: June 1979

Professional ratings
Review scores
Source	Rating
AllMusic	3/5 stars

Azure d'Or is the ninth studio album by the English progressive rock band Renaissance, released in May 1979.

== Overview ==
With this album the band stopped using an orchestra, choosing instead to overdub multiple instruments themselves in an attempt to emulate an orchestral sound. It was also the band's first album to exclusively feature short songs with no long "epic" pieces.

"Forever Changing" was the only Renaissance song on which drummer Terry Sullivan wrote all the music. His only other writing credit with the band was on the title track of the preceding album, A Song for All Seasons.

A pre-release track listing, published in the Renaissance Appreciation Society newsletter, included the song "Island of Avalon". This song ended up being omitted from the album; the band members weren't sufficiently pleased with it, having not invested their usual amount of time in it. It was ultimately used as the non-album B-side to "The Winter Tree" in April 1979; it was the only such B-side of the Haslam era of the band. It was released on CD in 1997 on the compilation Songs from Renaissance Days.

Following this album's release, Renaissance underwent major changes that left it with a very uncertain future. In 1980, following a short tour of Israel, both John Tout and Terry Sullivan left the band. Tout (who was dealing with some personal stress due to the death of his sister) had made a major mistake during a concert and walked offstage. After this it was mutually decided that he should leave the band. Terry Sullivan, a longtime friend of Tout's, then left the band as well on principle. On top of all this, the band's label, Warner Brothers/Sire, dropped the group due to disappointing sales of Azure d'Or.

== Track listing ==
Side one
No.	Title	Lyrics	Music	Length
1.	"Jekyll and Hyde"	Betty Thatcher	Michael Dunford	4:39
2.	"The Winter Tree"	Thatcher	Dunford	3:03
3.	"Only Angels Have Wings"	Jon Camp	Camp	3:41
4.	"Golden Key"	Thatcher	Dunford	5:12
5.	"Forever Changing"	Thatcher	Terence Sullivan	4:48

Side two
No.	Title	Lyrics	Music	Length
6.	"Secret Mission"	Camp	Camp	5:00
7.	"Kalynda (A Magical Isle)"	Camp	Camp	3:42
8.	"The Discovery" (Instrumental)	–	Camp	4:24
9.	"Friends"	Thatcher	Dunford	3:31
10.	"The Flood at Lyons"	Camp	Dunford	4:55

== Personnel ==
=== Renaissance ===
- Annie Haslam – lead (1–2, 4–7, 9–10) and backing vocals
- Michael Dunford – electric guitar (1, 5–6, 8–10), 12 string acoustic guitar (1–2, 4–9), classical guitar (5, 8), mandolin (4), autoharp (5, 10)
- John Tout – piano (1–2, 4–7, 9–10), Yamaha CS-80 (1–6, 8–10), Yamaha CS30 (1–2, 6, 8, 10), ARP String Ensemble (1–4, 6–7, 10), ARP Pro Soloist (4–5), ARP 2600 (8), Hammond B3 (8), Yamaha electric piano CP 70 (8), Mellotron (9–10)
- Jon Camp – backing and lead (3) vocals, bass (1–2, 4–10), bass pedals (4–10), cello (1), 12 string acoustic guitar (5), electric guitar (6–8)
- Terence Sullivan – drums (1–2, 4–10), percussion (1–2, 4, 6–9), timpani (5–6, 10), glockenspiel (5), gong (6), chimes (6, 10), xylophone (10), backing vocals (4)

=== Production ===
- David Hentschel – producer, engineer
- David Bascombe – assistant engineer
- Dick Plant – vocals recording
- Gered Mankowitz – art direction and photography
