= Ashes Are Burning =

- Cover design by Hipgnosis

Studio album by Renaissance
- Released: October 1973
- Recorded: April–August 1973
- Studios: De Lane Lea Studios, Wembley, UK
- Genre: Progressive rock
- Length: 40:39
- Labels: Sovereign (UK); Sovereign/Capitol (North America); Sovereign/Harvest (Germany); Regal Zonophone (Italy); EMI (rest of Europe and Japan)
- Producers: Dick Plant and Renaissance

Renaissance chronology
Prologue (1972)	Ashes Are Burning (1973)	Turn of the Cards (1974)

US release cover

Professional ratings
Review scores
Source	Rating
AllMusic	4/5 stars

Ashes Are Burning is the fourth studio album by the English progressive rock band Renaissance, released in 1973 (see 1973 in music). It was the first of several Renaissance albums to feature (on some songs) an orchestra playing along with the band. It was the band's first album to make the Billboard 200 album chart, peaking at No. 171. The front album cover features Annie Haslam (left) and Terence Sullivan (right); the back album cover similarly features John Tout (left) and Jon Camp (right).

== Background and recording ==
With Ashes Are Burning Renaissance made a deliberate choice to head in a more acoustic direction, in order to accommodate their folk-influenced style and differentiate themselves from the many electric guitar-dominated bands on the scene. Because Renaissance were between guitarists at the time, bassist Jon Camp played most of the guitars on the album. Michael Dunford, who had been working with Renaissance in a composer-only role, also played acoustic guitar on a few tracks. He later rejoined the band, but only after Ashes Are Burning had been released, so he is accordingly listed as a guest musician.

Most of the songwriting for the album was handled through the mail. Dunford would send a tape containing a melody line to Betty Thatcher, who composed the lyrics, and Dunford then mailed a tape of himself singing the completed song to Renaissance, who put together the arrangements in the studio.

After setting up to record at De Lane Lea Studios, the band brought on Dick Plant, an engineer at the studios, as co-producer. The band were impressed with his work on the album, leading them to retain him as co-producer for their next album.

== Songs ==
The song "Can You Understand?" uses a quote from "Tonya and Yuri Arrive at Varykino", a theme from Maurice Jarre's score for Doctor Zhivago. According to David Samuel Barr, a friend of the band who wrote the liner notes for the Tales of 1001 Nights compilation, Dunford had thought this melody to be a public domain Russian folk tune. Because of confusion over the Jarre quote, some live collections (including Live at the Royal Albert Hall : King Biscuit Flower Hour Vol. 1 and some unauthorised releases) mistakenly credit "Can You Understand?" entirely to Jarre.

"Can You Understand?" is also cited by Jon Camp as being a case where he and John Tout made major compositional contributions - Camp describes this as “probably our greatest opening instrumental piece” - without being credited for them. Terry Sullivan has corroborated that the intro to "Can You Understand?" was composed by Camp and Tout, not Dunford. This intro is approximately 2:38 long, and this same composition resumes later as an outro; combining the two, this Camp/Tout instrumental accounts for approximately 3:52 (40%) of the song's total time.

The song "On the Frontier" was previously released (also in 1973) by former Renaissance member Jim McCarty's band Shoot. It was the title track of their only album.

An early demo of "Carpet of the Sun," with a vocal by Jane Relf, was released in 2008 on the compilation Jane's Renaissance: The Complete Jane Relf Collection, 1969-1995. This demo version includes a verse which is not heard in the final version; however this verse is printed on the Ashes Are Burning LP's inner sleeve. (The verse begins with "Come along and try, looking into ways of giving. Maybe we will try, find a dream that we will live in".)

== Release ==
=== In the Beginning reissue ===
In 1978 Ashes Are Burning was reissued, together with the preceding album Prologue, as a double album called In the Beginning. While Prologue was reissued in complete form, the Ashes Are Burning song "At the Harbour" was edited down to 3:07. This was because a change in copyright laws in the interim had changed the status of certain early 20th century works, including Claude Debussy's La cathédrale engloutie, excerpts of which begin and end the full version of "At the Harbour". The 1988 CD version of In the Beginning (on one disc) had edited versions not only of this song, but also of "Ashes Are Burning" and of one Prologue song. The early-1990s CD reissue of "Ashes are Burning," on One Way Records, contains the full-length version of "At the Harbour". The album was re-issued on CD in its original form by Repertoire Records in 1995.

=== Expanded 2019 edition ===
In 2018 Esoteric Recordings announced a re-mastered and expanded edition of the album, which was released on 22 February 2019.

== Track listing ==
Side one
No.	Title	Writer(s)	Length
1.	"Can You Understand?"	Dunford, Thatcher	9:51
2.	"Let It Grow"	Dunford, Thatcher	4:14
3.	"On the Frontier"	Jim McCarty, Thatcher	4:55

Side two
No.	Title	Writer(s)	Length
4.	"Carpet of the Sun"	Dunford, Thatcher	3:31
5.	"At the Harbour"	Dunford, Thatcher	6:48
6.	"Ashes Are Burning"	Dunford, Thatcher	11:20

Bonus Tracks for 2019 re-mastered & expanded edition
No.	Title	Length
7.	"Can You Understand" (BBC Radio One "In Concert" - Recorded 3 January 1974 at the Paris Theatre in London)
8.	"Let it Grow" (BBC Radio One "In Concert" - Recorded 3 January 1974 at the Paris Theatre in London)
9.	"Ashes are Burning" (BBC Radio One "In Concert" - Recorded 3 January 1974 at the Paris Theatre in London)

== Personnel ==
Renaissance

- Annie Haslam – lead and backing vocals
- John Tout – keyboards, backing vocals
- Jon Camp (listed as "John Camp") – bass, electric and acoustic guitars, co-lead vocals on track 3, backing vocals
- Terence Sullivan – drums, backing vocals, percussion

Additional musicians

- Michael Dunford – acoustic guitar
- Andy Powell – electric guitar solo on track 6
- Richard Hewson – strings arrangements on tracks 1 and 4

Production

- Dick Plant – producer, engineer
- Richard Goldblatt – assistant engineer
- Hipgnosis – cover design
