= Terry Sullivan (drummer) =

British drummer (1938–2026)

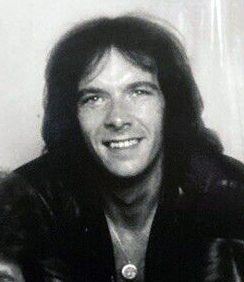
- Sullivan in 1979

Background information
- Born: 22 July 1938; Stepney, London, England, UK
- Died: 9 January 2026 (aged 87)
- Genres: Progressive rock
- Instruments: Drums, vocals
- Years active: 1960s–2026
- Formerly of: Renaissance

Terence Sullivan (22 July 1938 – 9 January 2026) was a British drummer. He is best known for being a member of the classic lineup of progressive rock band Renaissance.

== Career ==
In the 1960s, Sullivan was a member of the psych rock band Dry Ice, who toured with The Who, Pink Floyd, Spooky Tooth, King Crimson and The Groundhogs. They released one single in 1969. Sullivan cited Ringo Starr, Keith Moon and Mitch Mitchell as influences.

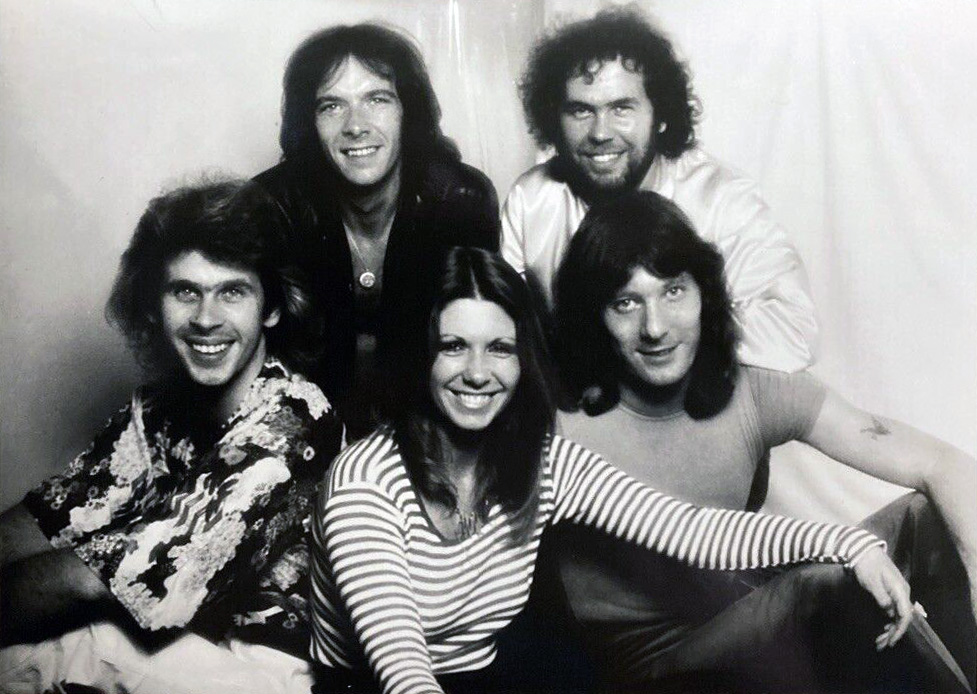
Renaissance in 1979, Sullivan sits at the top left

Sullivan joined Renaissance in 1972. He played on seven albums before he and John Tout left in 1980, after the release of Azure d'Or. For a few years afterwards, he kept a low profile and spent more time with his children, before forming the Good ol' Boys with Nick Simper from Deep Purple, Peter Parks from Warhorse and Ali McKenzie from The Birds.

Sullivan reformed Renaissance with Annie Haslam and Michael Dunford in 1998, and remained in this incarnation until it ended in 2002. In 2005, he released a solo album, South of Winter, under the name Renaissant, which featured lyrics by Renaissance lyricist Betty Newsinger, keyboards by John Tout, and vocals by Terry's wife Christine.

== Death ==
Terry died after a short illness on 9 January 2026, aged 87. At the time of his death, Sullivan was married to his wife, Christine, and had two children and a grandchild. His son, Lee, is also a drummer.

His death was announced by Renaissance singer Annie Haslam, who is now the only living member of the classic lineup.

== Discography ==
Renaissance

- Prologue (1972)
- Ashes Are Burning (1973)
- Turn of the Cards (1974)
- Scheherazade and Other Stories (1975)
- Novella (1977)
- A Song for All Seasons (1978)
- Azure d'Or (1979) - includes the Sullivan/Thatcher composition "Forever Changing", which was also released as the B-side of the single "Jekyll and Hyde"
- Tuscany (2001)

Renaissant

- South of Winter (2005)

Track listing:

Title	Lyrics	Music	Vocals
"Carry Me Home"	Betty Newsinger	Terence Sullivan/Lee Sullivan/John Tout	Christine Sullivan
"Alone"	Terence Sullivan	Terence Sullivan	Christine Sullivan
"Burning Bridges"	Betty Newsinger	Terence Sullivan/John Tout	Christine Sullivan
"Cold flames"	Betty Newsinger	Terence Sullivan	Terence Sullivan
"Dove"	Terence Sullivan	Terence Sullivan	Christine Sullivan
"Morning"	Terence Sullivan	Terence Sullivan	Christine Sullivan
"Careless"	Terence Sullivan	Terence Sullivan	Terence Sullivan
"The sun also sets"	Betty Newsinger	Terence Sullivan/John Tout	Christine Sullivan
"South of winter"	Betty Newsinger	Terence Sullivan/John Tout	Christine Sullivan
