= Renaissance (band) =

English progressive rock band

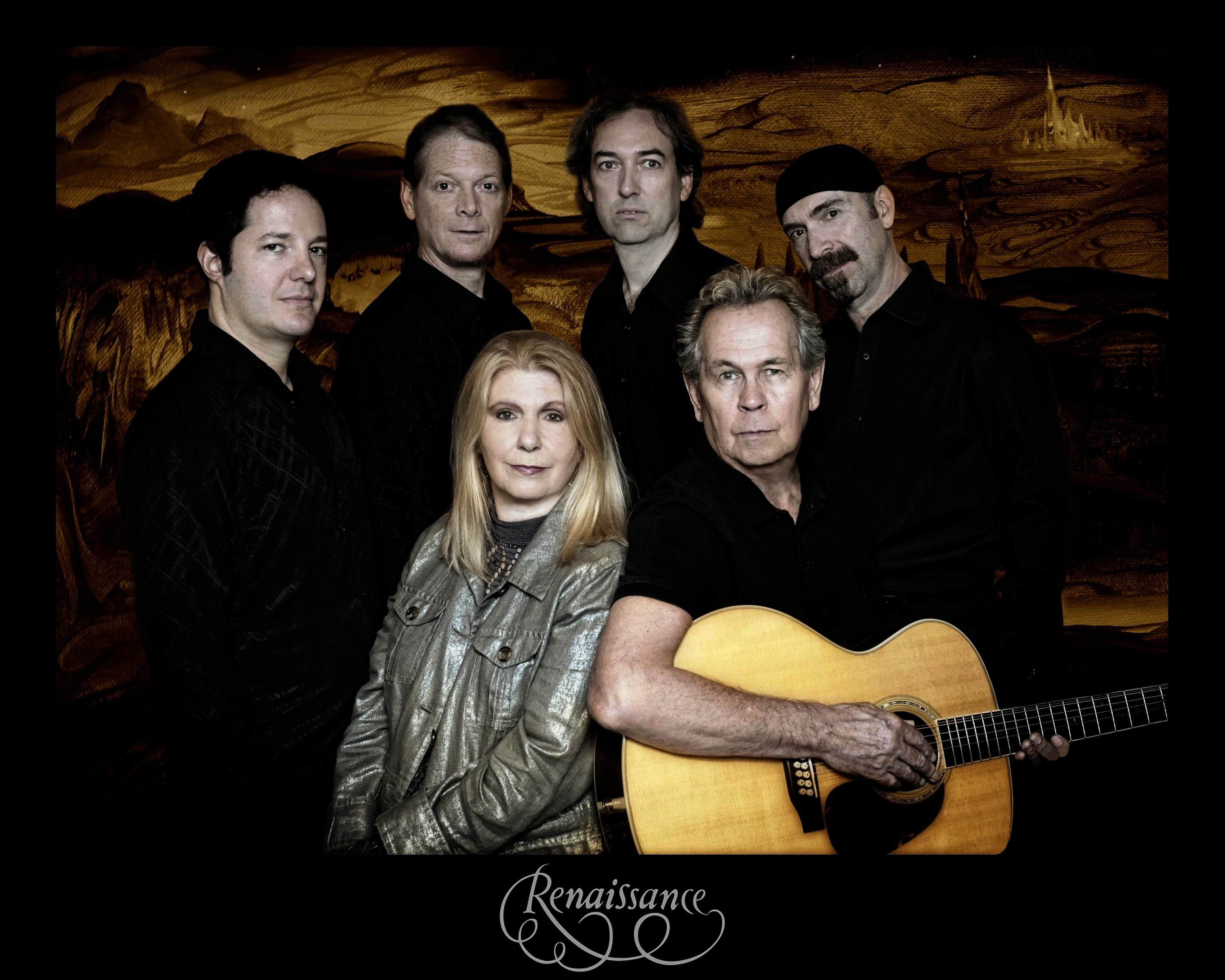
- Renaissance, 2012. Clockwise from upper left: Jason Hart, David J. Keyes, Rave Tesar, Frank Pagano, Michael Dunford, and Annie Haslam

Background information
- Origin: London, United Kingdom
- Genre: Progressive rock
- Years active: 1969–1987; 1998–2002; 2009–present
- Labels: Island; Sire (US); Warner Bros.; Elektra (US); BTM Records; I.R.S.; Giant Electric Pea; Illegal Records; Repertoire Records; HTD Records; Friday Music
- Members: Annie Haslam; Rave Tesar; Mark Lambert; Frank Pagano; John Galgano; Geoffrey Langley
- Past members: Keith Relf; Jane Relf; John Hawken; Louis Cennamo; Jim McCarty; Michael Dunford; John Tout; Jon Camp; Terry Sullivan
- Website: Official website

Renaissance are an English progressive rock band, best known for their 1978 UK top 10 hit "Northern Lights" and progressive rock classics like "Carpet of the Sun", "Mother Russia", and "Ashes Are Burning". They developed a unique sound, combining a female lead vocal with a fusion of classical, folk, rock, and jazz influences. Characteristic elements of the Renaissance sound are Annie Haslam's wide vocal range, prominent piano accompaniment, orchestral arrangements and vocal harmonies.

The band was founded by vocalist Keith Relf and drummer Jim McCarty, formerly of the Yardbirds; along with John Hawken, Louis Cennamo and Relf's sister Jane Relf. They intended to put "something together with more of a classical influence". Lyricist Betty Thatcher attributed the classical influence specifically to Keith Relf: " I think it was mainly Keith. He always loved classical music, Keith, it was Canon [by] Pachelbel that was his favourite piece of music. He played it all the time, and he always thought that we should merge everything… and he did." Renaissance released their self-titled debut album in 1969, but fell apart during the sessions for their follow-up, Illusion (1971). New musicians were brought in to complete the record, and Renaissance was kept active through a period of fluctuating personnel until none of the original lineup remained, although McCarty continued providing compositions for the band to record for several more years. By 1973, a stable lineup consisting of Annie Haslam, Michael Dunford, John Tout, Jon Camp, and Terry Sullivan solidified. Aside from McCarty, they were assisted with lyrics on many songs from Cornish poet Betty Thatcher-Newsinger. From 1972 to 1979 Renaissance released seven studio albums, toured extensively, and sold out three nights in a row at Carnegie Hall with Tony Cox conducting the New York Philharmonic. The band's success was largely concentrated in the United States, where they built a cult following.

Renaissance struggled through the 1980s with personnel changes and two relatively unsuccessful studio albums, leading to disbandment in 1987. Two different offshoots of the band existed at the same time at one period in the mid-1990s. The band re-formed in 1998 to record Tuscany, which was eventually released in 2001; however, they broke up again the next year. A new iteration of Renaissance, led by Haslam and Dunford, debuted in 2009, and since then the band has continued to record and tour. Dunford died in November 2012. Later, Haslam stated that the band would continue touring. In 2013, they released the studio album Grandine il Vento, re-released the following year under the title Symphony of Light.

The band performed a farewell tour in October 2024.

== Original incarnation (1969–1970) ==
As the Yardbirds were transforming into the New Yardbirds (with Jimmy Page) in 1968 and then Led Zeppelin, the departing founding members of the Yardbirds, Keith Relf and Jim McCarty, formed an acoustic duo called Together. They released "Henry's Coming Home" b/w "Love Mum and Dad" as a single on Columbia Records in November 1968 without chart success.

In January 1969, Relf and McCarty organized a new group devoted to experimentation with rock, folk, and classical forms. In his book Mountains Come Out of the Sky: An Illustrated History of Prog Rock, Will Romano quoted McCarty: "Toward the end of the Yardbirds we wanted to do something a bit more poetic, if you like, not so heavy. A bit more folky... We had had enough of heavy rock." This quintet—Relf on guitar and vocals, McCarty on drums and vocals, plus bassist Louis Cennamo, pianist John Hawken, and Relf's sister Jane Relf as an additional vocalist—released a pair of albums on Elektra (US) and Island (UK-ILPS 9114), the first one, titled simply Renaissance (1969), being produced by fellow ex-Yardbird Paul Samwell-Smith.

The band had begun performing in May 1969, before recording had commenced for the debut LP, mostly in the UK, but with occasional forays abroad, including festivals in Belgium (Amougies, October 1969) and France (Operation 666 at the Olympia in January 1970, and Le Bourget in March 1970, both in Paris). In February 1970, they embarked on a North American tour, but that month-long trek proved only marginally successful. Because of their Yardbirds credentials, they found themselves paired with bands such as the Kinks and their new classically-oriented direction did not always go down well because audiences were expecting rock/blues-based material.

Beginning in the late spring of 1970 as touring began to grind on them, the original band gradually dissolved. Keith Relf and McCarty decided to quit performing, and Cennamo joined Colosseum. Hawken organized a new line-up to fulfill contractual obligations to Island Records and complete the band's second album, Illusion (1971) which had been left unfinished.

== Transition (1970–71) ==
Apart from Jane Relf, the new band consisted mostly of former members of Hawken's previous band, the Nashville Teens – guitarist Michael Dunford, bassist Neil Korner and singer Terry Crowe, plus drummer Terry Slade. This line-up recorded one track, "Mr Pine", a Dunford composition, and played a few gigs during the summer of 1970. Meanwhile, a final recording session brought together the original line-up minus Hawken, with Don Shin sitting in on keyboards, and produced the album's closing track "Past Orbits of Dust". The now completed Illusion was released in Germany in 1971, although it was not released in the UK until 1976 (Island HELP 27). The album marked the beginning of Renaissance's long-standing collaboration with poet Betty Thatcher-Newsinger as lyricist when she co-wrote two songs with Relf and McCarty.

The two remaining original members left in late 1970; Jane Relf was replaced by American folk singer Anne-Marie "Binky" Cullom, then John Hawken left to join Spooky Tooth and pianist John Tout replaced him. There is an extant video (released on the DVD "Kings & Queens" in 2010) of that line-up performing five songs on a German TV program (Muzik-Kanal). The plan at the time was that Relf and McCarty would remain involved as non-performing members – Relf as a producer and McCarty as a songwriter. Both were present when singer Annie Haslam successfully auditioned in January 1971 to replace the departing Cullom (who would later marry drummer Terry Slade and retire from the music scene). While McCarty would go on to write songs for the new band, Relf's involvement would be short-lived. Dunford soon emerged as a prolific composer, and continued the writing partnership with Thatcher, who would go on to write most of the lyrics for the band's 1970s albums.

== Second incarnation (1971–1980) ==
Sometime in 1971, new manager Miles Copeland III decided to re-organize the band, focusing on what he felt were Renaissance's strong points – Haslam's voice and Tout's piano. Will Romano in Mountains Come Out of the Sky explained that "unlike many of the artists to which they were compared Renaissance allowed the piano and female voice to come to the forefront". Until then Haslam had shared vocals with Terry Crowe, who was in effect the band's chief vocalist. Crowe and Korner went, the former not replaced, the latter replaced by a succession of bass players, including John Wetton (later of King Crimson, U.K., and Asia), Frank Farrell (formerly of Supertramp) and Danny McCulloch (formerly of the Animals and a former bandmate of Dunford and Crowe in the Plebs), until the position settled with the inclusion of Jon Camp. It was also decided that Dunford would now concentrate on composing, and a new guitar player, Mick Parsons, was brought in for live work. In 1972, shortly before recording sessions for the new band's debut LP, drummer Terence Sullivan joined after Slade's initial replacement, Ginger Dixon, was deemed unsuitable following a European tour. Parsons died in a car accident and was replaced at short notice by Rob Hendry. The resulting line-up entered the studio having played only a dozen gigs together.

Prologue was released later in 1972 on EMI-Sovereign Records in the UK and on Capitol-Sovereign in North America. Prologue's music was, except for two songs by McCarty, composed by Dunford, with all lyrics by Thatcher-Newsinger. Rock radio stations (particularly in the northeast US and Cleveland) gave the song "Spare Some Love" significant airplay for a few months after the album's release, and fans of Yes and Emerson, Lake & Palmer in particular, took notice of the band. Francis Monkman, of the group Curved Air (another group managed by Copeland), was a guest on VCS3 synthesizer on the final track "Rajah Khan".

Hendry left (Note: In 1974, after leaving Renaissance, Hendry briefly joined The Nashville Teens, which four other Renaissance members had previously belonged to. See The Nashville Teens - Former members.) and was replaced for the Prologue tour by Peter Finberg, but Finberg was already committed to another band and so could not be a permanent replacement. This left Camp to play most of the guitar on their next album, Ashes are Burning, released in 1973. Though the band were trying to transition to a more acoustic sound, Andy Powell, of the group Wishbone Ash (yet another group managed by Copeland), was brought in for an electric guitar solo on the final track "Ashes are Burning", which became the band's anthem piece, often extended in live performances to over twenty minutes with a long bass solo and other instrumental workouts. The album became the band's first to chart in the US, where it reached No. 171 on the Billboard 200. Shortly after the album's release, Michael Dunford returned as (acoustic) guitarist, completing what most fans regard as the classic five-piece line-up, which would remain together through five studio albums. The band played their first US concerts during this period, enjoying success on the East Coast in particular, which soon resulted in a special orchestral concert at New York's Academy of Music in May 1974. Soon Renaissance would choose to concentrate on the US market, as the UK press virtually ignored them.

=== Joining BTM label ===
The band left Sovereign Records and joined Miles Copeland's new prog rock stable and label BTM (for British Talent Management). The label's first release was Turn of the Cards in 1974. With a larger budget, the album went from folk-flavoured to a more dark, lush, orchestral rock sound. One of the album's songs, "Things I Don't Understand", which clocked in at 9:30, was Jim McCarty's last co-writing credit with the group (although it was actually in the band's live repertoire for years). A lengthy tribute to Aleksandr Solzhenitsyn, called "Mother Russia", closed out the album, with lyrics inspired by his autobiographical novel, One Day in the Life of Ivan Denisovich. Turn of the Cards was first issued in the United States on Sire Records in August 1974, where it reached No. 94, some months before an official UK release. It remained in the Billboard 200 for 21 weeks. Although Renaissance's fan base was relatively small, its following was heavily concentrated in the large cities of the northeast US. The album was eventually released in the UK in March 1975.

It was soon followed by Scheherazade and Other Stories, released on both sides of the Atlantic in September 1975. The album, whose second side was taken up with the epic tone-poem "Song of Scheherazade" based on stories from One Thousand and One Nights, peaked at No. 48 in the United States. There is "no musical connection to the well-known classical work Scheherazade by Nikolai Rimsky-Korsakov", but the track does have a recurring six-note motif that alludes to that work.

A double live album, Live at Carnegie Hall, followed in 1976. Despite criticisms that much of the album was little more than a note for note reproduction of highlights from their previous four studio albums, the album reached No. 55 in the US. Renaissance were the first British band to sell out three consecutive nights at Carnegie Hall. They were joined on stage by the New York Philharmonic Orchestra. While introducing the song "Ashes Are Burning", Haslam refers to it as the title track from the group's second album, rather than their fourth, suggesting that the Haslam-led lineup by this point considered themselves a distinct band from Keith Relf's incarnation of the group. (This point is further underscored by the band's including an album discography in the gatefold of LP copies of Live at Carnegie Hall, which lists only the four albums from Prologue forward.)

Live at Carnegie Hall's follow-up, Novella, saw more chart success in the US, peaking at No. 46 in 1977, although its UK release was delayed by yet another label change. Will Romano in Mountains Come Out of the Sky describes the band: "Renaissance was at an all-time popularity high, finding themselves playing to sold-out audiences ... in the U.S., particularly in the northeastern part of the country, in Pennsylvania and New York."

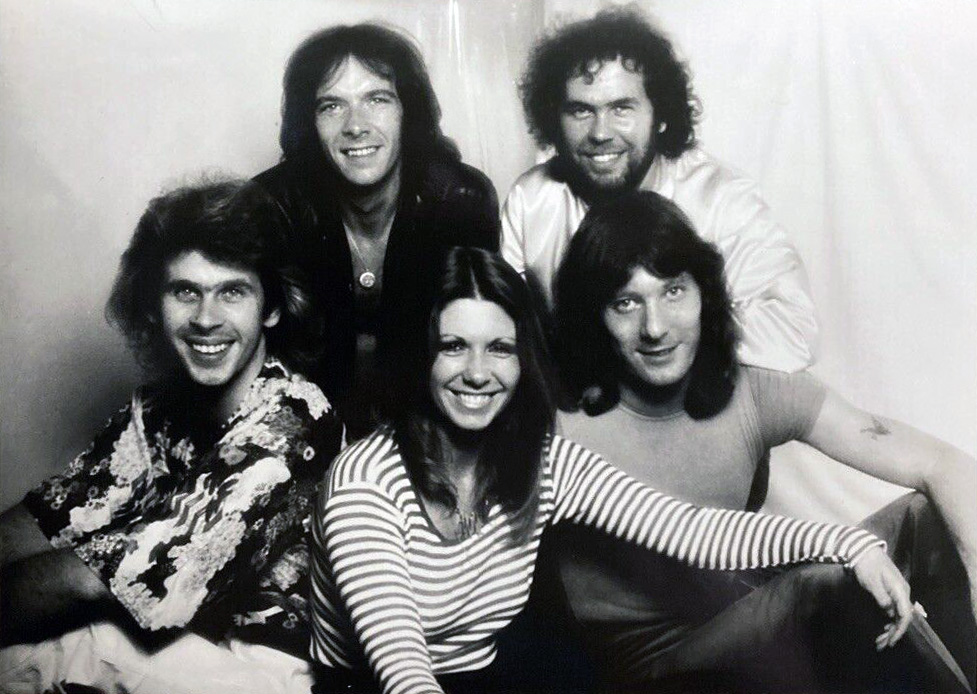
Renaissance, 1979. Clockwise from upper left: Terry Sullivan, Michael Dunford, John Tout, Annie Haslam, and Jon Camp.

=== UK hit single ===
Although commercial success was limited during this period, Renaissance scored a hit single in Britain with "Northern Lights", which reached No. 10 during the summer of 1978. The single was taken from the album A Song for All Seasons (a No. 58 album in the US), and received significant airplay in the US on both AOR and on radio stations adapting to a new format known as "soft rock", now known as adult contemporary. The band performed on a modestly successful tour of the US east of the Mississippi and drew significant crowds in State College, Pennsylvania and Cleveland in May and June 1979, promoting both A Song for All Seasons and a mix of old and new tracks. Additionally, the band gained exposure via US television; performing "Carpet of the Sun" in 1977 on The Midnight Special, and appearing as guests on the May 4, 1978, edition of the Mike Douglas Show, where they played "Northern Lights".

Renaissance floundered following 1979's Azure d'Or, as many fans could not relate to a largely synthesizer-oriented sound. As a result, the band's fan base began to lose interest and the album only reached No. 125. Dunford and Camp assumed most of the band's songwriting.

In the 1970s, Renaissance defined their work with folk rock and classical fusions. Their songs include quotations from and allusions to such composers as Jehan Alain, Johann Sebastian Bach, Frédéric Chopin, Claude Debussy, Remo Giazotto, Maurice Jarre, Sergei Rachmaninoff, Nikolai Rimsky-Korsakov, Sergei Prokofiev and Dmitri Shostakovich. Renaissance records, especially Ashes Are Burning, were frequently played on American progressive rock radio stations such as WNEW-FM, WHFS-FM, WMMR-FM, WJUL-FM, KSHE 95 and WVBR.

=== Critical reaction to the "classic line-up" ===
Reviewers were deeply divided in their reactions to the "classic" period of Renaissance, and their style of music. Some critics saw little value in their music, like Wayne King's entry in The New Rolling Stone Record Guide describing the period 1974 to 1983: "Their inability to compose songs that would allow for any fluidity or improvisation meant that Renaissance's appeal, nonexistent in their native England and cultish at best in America, declined ... and the remainder of the Sire material matches this commercial decline with an artistic one. The comeback attempt on IRS ... was a ludicrous failure." Progressive rock reviewers were much more supportive, such as Charles Snider in The Strawberry Bricks Guide to Progressive Rock evaluating the album Scheherazade and Other Stories, who describes:

Renaissance "Trip to the Fair" (1975)
John Tout playing piano on "Trip to the Fair" from the album Scheherazade and Other Stories.

"Annie Haslam's crystal clear five-octave voice high in the mix, supported by the virtuoso talents of pianist John Tout and Jon Camp's distinctive Rickenbacker bass, and orchestral arrangements by Tony Cox."

== 1980–1998 ==
After the Azure d'Or tour, Tout left the group for personal reasons, quickly followed by Sullivan. Subsequent albums Camera Camera (1981) and Time-Line (1983) brought Renaissance more into the contemporary synthpop and new wave genre, but neither garnered enough commercial interest to make a viable future for the band. Camera Camera was the band's final album to chart in the US where it reached No. 196 in late 1981.

New members Peter Gosling (keyboards, synthesizers) and Peter Barron (drums, percussion) appeared on Camera Camera and the band's followup 1981 and 1982 tours, but were replaced respectively for 1983's Time-Line by Mike Taylor and Gavin Harrison. But in 1985 Camp left to join another group called Cathedrale and Haslam and Dunford led an acoustic version of the band that included keyboard player Raphael Rudd and bassist/guitarist Mark Lampariello, both from the US, and performed occasional shows from 1985 until their break up in August 1987.

In 1988 Sire issued a two-part compilation, Tales of 1001 Nights, focusing on the band's 1972–79 period. In the 1990s most of their catalogue appeared on CD from reissue record labels such as Repertoire Records (Germany). In 2006 Repertoire issued remastered versions of Ashes are Burning, Turn of the Cards and Scheherezade and Other Stories.

In the mid-1990s, both Haslam (who had released a self-titled solo album in 1989) and Dunford (who had been working on a proposed musical based on the Scheherazade storyline) formed their own bands, each using the name Renaissance and releasing albums with different line-ups.

== Third incarnation ==
Renaissance partially re-formed in 1998 around a nucleus of Haslam, Dunford and Sullivan, plus Tout and several new musicians, most notably Roy Wood and Mickey Simmonds, to record the CD Tuscany. In 1999, Haslam, Dunford and Simmonds played a one-off trio concert at London's Astoria supporting Caravan.

In March 2001, following the delayed release of Tuscany, a full band tour was organised, with a line-up of Haslam, Dunford, Sullivan, Simmonds, Rave Tesar (keyboards) and David J. Keyes (bass and vocals), who played one London concert on 9 March (again at the Astoria) and three dates in Japan – Osaka on the 13th, Nagoya on the 14th and Tokyo on the 16th. The Tokyo concert was recorded and released as In the Land of the Rising Sun: Live in Japan 2001. (Tout, although in the audience at the Astoria, did not perform on this tour.) Haslam, who had become the band's spokesperson, said that several factors made further touring and recording impractical. The band's short third incarnation was soon over.

Terry Sullivan recorded an album called South of Winter in 2004, with a studio group he named Renaissant. It is evocative of Renaissance's music, with lyrics by Thatcher-Newsinger and keyboard contributions by John Tout.

On 20 September 2008, John Tout made his first public appearance in the US in over 25 years, with Annie Haslam and the Jann Klose band, at the Sellersville Theatre 1894 in Sellersville, Pennsylvania. In 2009, Tout suffered a heart attack.

In August 2009, Haslam announced that she and Dunford were commemorating the 40th anniversary of Renaissance with a re-formed band, called Renaissance 2009 (including no other members of the "classic" line-up, but with musicians from the 2001 incarnation of the band), and a concert tour.

A tour in Eastern North America and Japan was undertaken in 2010, together with a three-song EP release and a new official website. Renaissance headlined the sold-out final edition of the North East Art Rock Festival, entitled NEARfest Apocalypse, on 23 June 2012.

In 2019 the band played its 50th Anniversary tour, joined onstage by founder Jim McCarty at their performance at Keswick Theater in Glenside, Pennsylvania on 12 October 2019.

In 2024 the group announced its farewell tour, called "In Gratitude".

But then, bowing to a special request, Annie and the group returned in the fall of 2025, bringing back Jim McCarty for a special tour presenting the History of Renaissance. This show featured a talk of the group's beginnings by Annie and Jim, followed by performances with Jim, then Annie with the rest of the Renaissance band Rave Tesar (keyboards), Mark Lambert (guitars, backing vocals), Geoffrey Langley (keyboards, synthesizers, backing vocals), John Galgano (bass, backing vocals) and Frank Pagano (drums, percussion, backing vocals).

== Deaths of former members ==
Keith Relf (born 22 March 1943), the band's original lead singer, died on 12 May 1976, electrocuted while playing a poorly-earthed guitar.

Betty Thatcher (born 16 February 1944), the band's non-performing lyricist who wrote most of the lyrics for the band (mostly for the second 'classic' lineup, but starting with the original Relf-led version), died on 15 August 2011.

Michael Dunford (born 8 July 1944) died from a cerebral hemorrhage on 20 November 2012 at his home in Surrey, England. A few weeks later, Haslam stated that the band would continue touring in the future, despite losing "her guiding light". In February 2013, it was announced that Ryche Chlanda would be the guitarist on their 2013 tour.

John Tout (born 2 September 1944) died of lung failure on 1 May 2015 at the Royal Free Hospital in Hampstead, London. The band paid tribute to their former keyboardist on their Facebook page, saying "He was an amazing musician, highly contributing to the unique sound of the band from 1970–1980."

David J. Keyes, the band's latter-day bassist and vocalist, died in July 2019 from leiomyosarcoma.

John Hawken (born 9 May 1940), the band's original keyboardist, died on May 15, 2024, at the age of 84.

Jon Camp (born 9 October 1949) died on December 13, 2024, at the age of 75. Annie Haslam paid tribute to Camp on the RenaissanceTouring Facebook page:

"It is with great sadness that Jon Camp our incomparable bass player has passed away. Jon played a huge role in the band with his unique powerful yet emotional bass playing, occasional acoustic guitar parts, singing and of course songwriting. Terence Sullivan and I had a long conversation, both of us stunned by the news. We talked about the early days in the band, the fun we had together but more importantly creating unique, dramatic and the most beautiful music one could ever wish for. Then we had all the excitement of touring especially performing at Carnegie Hall and then at the Royal Albert Hall with all our parents having their own 'boxes', our hit single Northern Lights! many priceless memories with Jon.

His favourite song was Ashes are Burning which Terry and I have chosen as a tribute. AMAZING bass solo !!!! https://www.youtube.com/watch?v=R1ULz9nLgaE Jon we will see you again somewhere out there and make more heavenly music.

Love, Annie Haslam and Terry"

Terry Sullivan (born 22 July 1938) died in January 2026, at the age of 87.

== Symphony of Light ==
In April 2013 a new Renaissance album, Grandine il Vento, was released. It was dedicated on the inside sleeve to Dunford. This album was reissued as Symphony of Light in April 2014 with three bonus tracks.

Renaissance "The Mystic and the Muse" (2014)
30 second sample of Renaissance playing "The Mystic and the Muse"

Symphony of Light follows a similar path to the band's early work with a combination of shorter songs, and longer, more progressive tracks such as the title track, and "The Mystic and the Muse". The band were joined by well-known guest musicians Ian Anderson playing the flute on "Cry to the World", and John Wetton performing a duet with Haslam on "Blood Silver Like Moonlight". All the music was written by Dunford, except "Renaissance Man" (dedicated to Dunford) which was written by Rave Tesar. All the lyrics were written by Haslam, and the artwork featured a painting 'Symphony of Light' also by Haslam.

Ralph Greco, Jr. in vintagerock.com observed that "Symphony of Light thrives on lush production, evocative lyrics, excellent playing and that superlative voice that could only belong to Annie Haslam."

The current line-up is not as English as the band's early period with five U.S. born members, and one English born member who lives in the U.S.

== Personnel ==
Current members

- Annie Haslam – vocals, percussion (1971–1987, 1998–2002, 2009–present)
- Rave Tesar – keyboards, piano (2001–2002, 2009–present)
- Mark Lambert – guitar, backing vocals (2015–present); bass (1985–1987)
- Frank Pagano – drums, percussion, backing vocals (2009–2017, 2018–present)
- John Galgano – bass, backing vocals (2023–present)
- Geoffrey Langley – keyboards, backing vocals (2016–present)

== Discography ==
=== Studio albums ===
Year	Title	Chart positions				Comments
Year	Title	UK	US	NL	CAN	Comments
1969	Renaissance	60	―	10	―	
1971	Illusion	―	―	―	―	1977 (UK)
1972	Prologue	―	―	―	―	
1973	Ashes Are Burning	―	171	―	―	
1974	Turn of the Cards	―	94	―	95	
1975	Scheherazade and Other Stories	―	48	―	―	
1977	Novella	―	46	―	―	
1978	A Song for All Seasons	35	58	―	45	BPI: Silver
1979	Azure d'Or	73	125	―	―	
1981	Camera Camera	―	196	―	―	
1983	Time-Line	―	207	―	―	
2001	Tuscany	―	―	―	―	
2013	Grandine il vento	―	―	―	―	Reissued in 2014 as Symphony of Light with bonus tracks
"―" denotes releases that did not chart or were not released in that territory.

=== Live albums ===
Year	Title	Chart positions			Comments
Year	Title	UK	US	CAN	Comments
1976	Live at Carnegie Hall	―	55	44	
2002	In the Land of the Rising Sun: Live in Japan 2001	―	―	―	
2011	Renaissance Tour 2011 – Turn of the Cards and Scheherazade & Other Stories Live in Concert (DVD and double CD set)	―	―	―	
2016	Renaissance 2012 (recorded April 16, 2015) – Renaissance Live at the Union Chapel (DVD and digital only audio set)	―	―	―	
2016	Renaissance Live at the BBC Sight & Sound (DVD and 3-CD set)	―	―	―	Contains radio/television broadcasts of three live concerts, one each from the years 1975-77. The DVD contains the video of the televised concert in London on 8 January 1977.
2018	A Symphonic Journey (recorded October 27, 2017) – Live In Concert (DVD and double CD set)	―	―	―	
2021	Renaissance 50th Anniversary: Ashes Are Burning - An Anthology - Live in Concert (Blu-ray/DVD/2CD Box)	―	―	―	2019 lineup performing 12 October 2019 in Glenside, PA.
2023	The Legacy Tour 2022 (2CD)	―	―	―	Recorded on 21 October 2022, at the Keswick Theatre, Glenside, PA.
2025	Renaissance In Gratitude Farewell Tour Live (2CD)	―	―	―	Recorded in October 2024 at the Scottish Rite Auditorium, Collingswood, NJ.
"―" denotes releases that did not chart or were not released in that territory.

=== Other releases ===
- In the Beginning (compilation double-album of Prologue and Ashes are Burning), 1978
- Tales of 1001 Nights (compilation in two volumes), 1990
- Da Capo (Repertoire Germany compilation), 1995 (2 CDs) (Limited Edition in tall digipak with a much more concise, detailed booklet)
- Live at the Royal Albert Hall: King Biscuit Flower Hour, 1997 (live performance recorded 1977; two volumes)
- Songs from Renaissance Days, 1997 (compilation of out-takes, including one B-side and two Haslam solo tracks, 1979–88)
- The BBC Sessions 1975–1978, 1999 (2 CDs)
- Day of the Dreamer, 2000 (live performance recorded 1978)
- Live at the Academy of Music, Philadelphia, 2000 (live performance recorded 1985) (Note: The title of this CD is not given consistently in the CD package. The title listed here is the one given on the spine of the CD package. However, the text on the front cover and physical CD reads: "Unplugged" "Live" at the Academy of Music, Philadelphia USA.)
- Live + Direct, 2002 (edited 1970 live recording plus demos and miscellany, by Renaissance and related artists, from 1968 to 1976)
- Innocents and Illusions, 2004 (compilation double CD of Renaissance and Illusion from the original incarnation)
- Dreams & Omens, 2008 (live performance recorded 1978)
- Live in Chicago, 2010 (live performance recorded 1983)
- The Mystic and the Muse (three-track EP of new songs), 2010
- Past Orbits of Dust, 2012 (live performances, plus one remastered studio track, from 1969 to 1970)
- Symphony of Light, 2014 (includes all songs from Grandine il vento and The Mystic and the Muse plus one new track)
- DeLane Lea Studios 1973, 2015 (live performance recorded 1973)
- Academy of Music, 2015 (live performance recorded 1974)
- Can You Hear Me? Broadcasts 1974-1978, 2024 (2 CDs, 1 Blu-ray)

=== Singles ===
Year	Title	UK	Certifications
1970	"Island" / "The Sea"	―	
1972	"Spare Some Love" / "Prologue"	―	
1973	"Carpet of the Sun"	―	
1974	"Mother Russia"	―	
1977	"Back Home Once Again" / "The Captive Heart"	―	
1977	"Midas Man"	―	
1978	"Northern Lights" / "Opening Out"	10	BPI: Silver
1979	"The Winter Tree" / "Island of Avalon"	―	
1979	"Jekyll and Hyde" / "Forever Changing"	―	
1981	"Faeries (Living at the Bottom of My Garden)" / "Bonjour Swansong"	―	
1981	"Bonjour Swansong"	―	
1983	"Richard IX"	―	
2010	"The Mystic and the Muse" (EP)	―	
"–" denotes releases that did not chart.

=== Michael Dunford's Renaissance ===
These albums were essentially collaborations between Dunford and singer Stephanie Adlington.

- The Other Woman, 1994 (originally issued as by "Renaissance")
- Ocean Gypsy, 1997 (mostly new versions of past Renaissance songs)
- Trip to the Fair, 1998 (compilation of tracks from the previous two releases)

=== Annie Haslam's Renaissance ===
This album was essentially an Annie Haslam solo release (one of several).

- Blessing in Disguise, 1994.

=== Renaissant ===
This album was essentially a Terry Sullivan solo release with lyrics by Betty Thatcher-Newsinger and keyboards by John Tout. Terry's wife Christine did most of the vocals, with Terry himself taking lead on two songs.

- South of Winter (2005)

=== Major television appearances ===
- Don Kirshner's Rock Concert

Multi-artist television programme with Renaissance performing "Can You Understand" and "Black Flame". Syndicated (USA), 1974. 11 minutes, original running time unknown.

- The Midnight Special

Multi-artist television programme with Renaissance performing "Carpet of the Sun" and "Midas Man". NBC (USA), 1976. 5 minutes, original running time unknown.

- Sight and Sound in Concert

First in a series of programmes consisting of artists performing live with the first performance broadcast simultaneously on BBC TV and FM radio, hosted by DJ Alan Black. Songs performed were: "Carpet of the Sun", "Mother Russia", "Can You Hear Me?", "Ocean Gypsy", "Running Hard", "Touching Once" and "Prologue". Originally broadcast on 8 January 1977. BBC (UK), 1977. Approximately 50–55 minutes.

- The Mike Douglas Show

Television talk show features Renaissance performing "Northern Lights" and "Day of the Dreamer" on 4 May 1978.

- MTV Interview

Interview by J.J. Jackson with Annie Haslam and Jon Camp on the Time Line album Tour. MTV (USA), April 1983. 10 minutes.

=== Illusion ===
Shortly prior to his death (May 1976), Keith Relf wanted to try to reform the original Renaissance. Since the name Renaissance was now firmly in the hands of the Haslam lineup, he chose the tentative band name "Now". Jim McCarty was not involved at this point. After Relf's death (May 1976), the surviving four formed a new band (along with two new musicians) and named it Illusion after Renaissance's second album. Illusion released two albums for Island Records before splitting, while a third made up of unreleased demos appeared years later. The demos were recorded in 1979 but no label was interested in them which caused Illusion to break up. The original four reformed again for the production of Through the Fire which was released under the bandname of Renaissance-Illusion. There are two second albums entitled Illusion: the second album of the original Renaissance (1971); and the eponymous second album of their reunion band, Illusion (1978).

- Out of the Mist (1977) produced by Paul Samwell-Smith (original bass player of the Yardbirds)
- Illusion (1978) produced by Douglas Bogie (recording engineer)
- Enchanted Caress: Previously Unreleased Material (1990) produced by Jim McCarty
- Illusion: The Island Years (2003) 2-CD compilation of Out of the Mist/Illusion with unreleased track by Keith Relf

=== Renaissance-Illusion ===
- Through the Fire (2001) produced by Jim McCarty

=== Covers of Renaissance songs ===
This list does not include Renaissance songs performed by individual former members of the band.

- "Ashes Are Burning" on the Faith & Disease albums Fortune His Sleep (1995) and Livesongs: Third Body (1996).
- "Ocean Gypsy" on the Blackmore's Night album Shadow of the Moon (1997 – a ballad version).
- "Northern Lights" on the Judith Durham album Mona Lisas (1996)
- In the Mists of Time, a 2020 Renaissance tribute album by the Brazilian crossover duo Fleesh.
