= Jon Camp =

English musician (1949–2024)

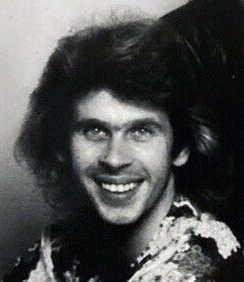
- Camp in 1979

Background information
- Born: 9 October 1949; Winchmore Hill, London, England
- Died: 13 December 2024 (aged 75)
- Instruments: Bass, guitar, vocals
- Years active: 1967–2024
- Formerly of: Renaissance

Jon Camp (9 October 1949 — 13 December 2024) was an English musician. He was the bassist for Renaissance from 1972 to 1985. He, along with Chris Squire, have been quoted as pioneers of the Rickenbacker bass sound.

== Early life ==
Jon Camp, born in Winchmore Hill, London, went to Edmonton County Grammar School until he was eighteen. Camp's parents bought him his first guitar, a Selmer 555 acoustic guitar, for his tenth birthday. After leaving school his father, who worked in insurance, gave him three months to make a living as a musician or work in insurance.

== Career ==
His main influences were instrumental groups such as The Shadows, The Outlaws, The Ventures and The Tornados. Jon's first group, which had him on lead guitar, was called 7th Dimension. He soon joined another group, Pepper, who were looking for a bassist; Camp stole his friends bass, auditioned, and got the part, despite the fact Jon could not play the bass. Pepper became known for backing American soul artists who toured in the UK, including Ben E. King, Clyde McPhatter, the Drifters, the Three Degrees, Gary U.S. Bonds and Four Tops. He was also in The Nocturnes, which featured Lyn Paul and Eve Graham of The New Seekers.

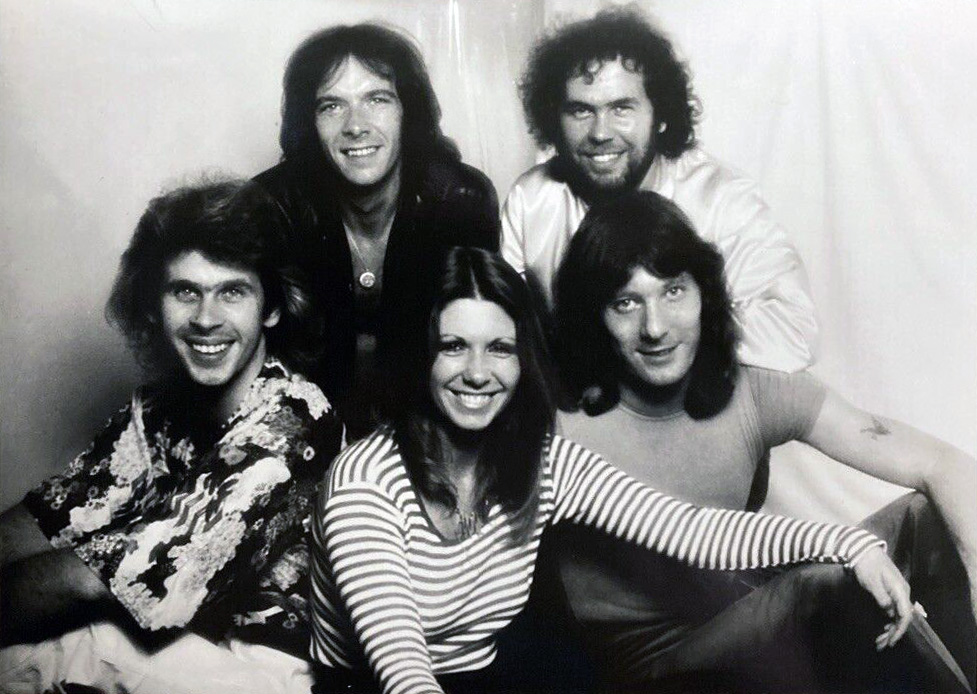
Renaissance in 1979: Jon Camp sits at the bottom left

In 1972, Camp answered an ad in an issue of Melody Maker about a band looking for a bass player. This band was Renaissance, who had already had a rotation of different bass players since forming in 1969. Camp played in Renaissance from 1972 to 1985, during which he played on nine albums, performed both bass and guitar, and was a primary songwriter in the band's later half of the 70s. Camp was the male lead on the song "Song of Scheherazade" from the album Scheherazade and Other Stories. Camp left Renaissance in 1985.

For many years, Camp was the touring bassist for Roy Wood and played in a band with him called Helicopters. Through Wood, Camp met Robin George, who he toured with on a world tour featuring REO Speedwagon. Camp moved to Shropshire where he built a home studio. There he met keyboardist John Young and they formed the band Cathedrale with guitarist Brett Wilde, drummer Tony Bodene and vocalist Mark Goddard-Parker. Their only album was released in 2017.

He joined forces with Maurice Douglas to form the duo Mojo, whose album was released in 2017.

== Personal life and death ==
Jon was close friends with Roy Wood, who is the godfather to Camp's daughters. Camp died on 13 December 2024 at the age of 75. A cause of death was not revealed but he did have Huntington's disease at the time of his death.

== Discography ==
Renaissance

- Prologue (1972)
- Ashes Are Burning (1973)
- Turn of the Cards (1974)
- Scheherazade and Other Stories (1975)
- Novella (1977)
- A Song for All Seasons (1978)
- Azure d'Or (1979)
- Camera Camera (1981)
- Time-Line (1983)

Others

- Annie in Wonderland — Annie Haslam (1977)
- Live Under Brazilian — Annie Haslam (1998)
- Things Are Getting Stranger on the Shore — Mordecai Smyth
- J2-B2 (Cathedrale) - recorded 1989-1991, released by Angel Air Records 2017
- Urgent Delivery (Mojo) released by Repertoire Records 2017
