= John Tout =

English musician (1944–2015)

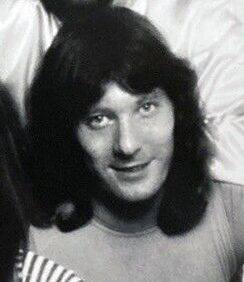
- Tout in 1979

Background information
- Born: 2 September 1944; Hackney, England
- Died: 1 May 2015 (aged 70) Royal Free Hospital, Hampstead, England
- Genres: Progressive rock, psychedelic pop
- Instrument: Keyboards
- Years active: 1962–1980, 1990s–2015
- Formerly of: Renaissance, Rupert's People

John Tout (2 September 1944 – 1 May 2015) was an English musician. He was the keyboardist for the progressive rock band Renaissance from 1970 to 1980, and played the piano on two tracks of John Lennon's Imagine album in 1971.

== Early life ==
John Tout was born in Hackney in 1944 to a father who played violin. John first took piano lessons at age eight. He had been wanting to play since he was four but his family could not afford a piano; finally for his eighth birthday his dad bought a mahogany piano for £20 and started paying for lessons. When he was sixteen, he and his friend Robert Allen started jamming with each other, with Allen on drums. His favourite music from the early 60s was blues, particularly Georgie Fame and Zoot Money as he loved the organ sound, especially the Hammond organ.

== Career ==
John joined his first band at eighteen or nineteen, as the Hammond organist in a band called The Walkers. In the late 1960s Tout was a member of the psychedelic pop band Rupert's People. On two occasions, Tout nearly died while on tour with the band when they were involved in two traffic collisions. They spent six months on tour in Beirut.

Tout joined Renaissance in 1970, replacing John Hawken, who had left to join Spooky Tooth. Their manager, Miles Copeland III, wanted to build the band around Annie Haslam's vocals and Tout's keyboard, which he thought was the strong points of the band. The following year Tout played piano on two tracks ("Crippled Inside" and "How Do You Sleep?") of John Lennon's album Imagine, but he is incorrectly credited as playing acoustic guitar. In 1972, he played the organ on "Throw Down The Sword" on the Wishbone Ash album Argus.

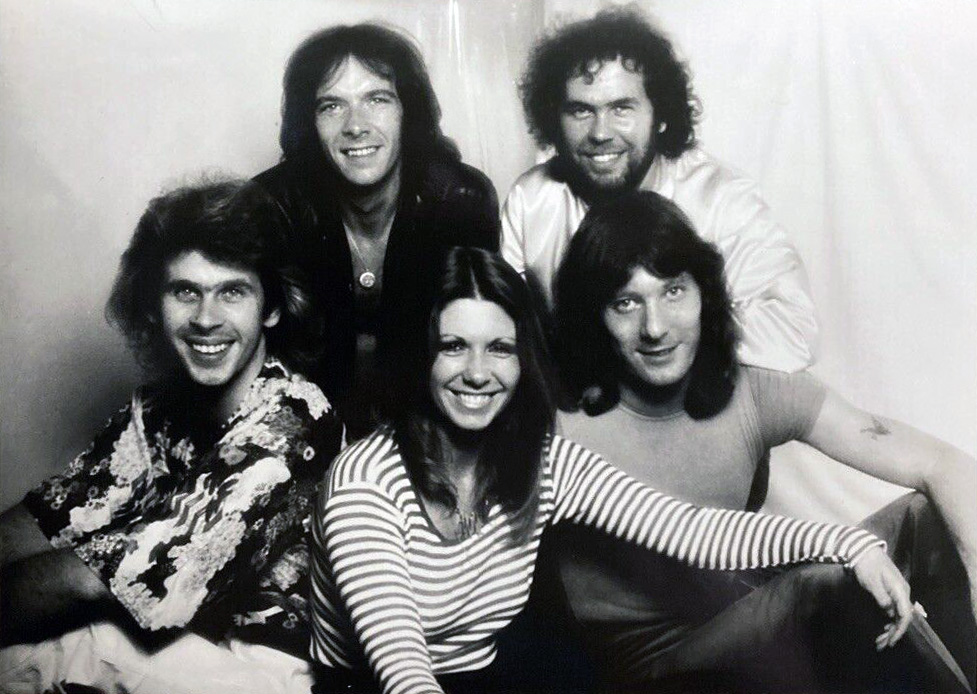
Renaissance in 1979 John Tout sits in the bottom right

After a tour promoting their 1979 album Azure d'Or, Tout left Renaissance for personal reasons, as he was greiving the passing of his sister, who had died from many years of narcotic abuse; Tout was close to his sister, who also played piano, and spent the first ten years after her death not playing music at all and for a while John lived in seclusion, but after therapy and help from others started performing again.

Tout returned to Renaissance in 1998 to work on a new album, Tuscany, but during the recording Tout was replaced by Mickey Simmonds.

In 2004 he played on the album South of Winter with former Renaissance colleague Terry Sullivan under the name Renaissant. Lyricist Betty Newsinger (formerly Thatcher) also contributed to the album.

He appeared with Annie Haslam and the Jann Klose band, at the Sellersville Theatre 1894 in Sellersville, Pennsylvania on 20 September 2008. A year later, Tout suffered a heart attack.

== Death ==
Tout died of lung failure at the Royal Free Hospital in Hampstead at 4:30pm on 1 May 2015. He was 70. The bands facebook posted a tribute to him. His mother had died not long before him.

== Discography ==
Renaissance

- Illusion (1971)
- Prologue (1972)
- Ashes Are Burning (1973)
- Turn of the Cards (1974)
- Scheherazade and Other Stories (1975)
- Novella (1977)
- A Song for All Seasons (1978)
- Azure d'Or (1979)
- Tuscany (2001)

Others

- Imagine — John Lennon — 1971
- Argus — Wishbone Ash — 1972
- On the Frontier — Shoot — 1973
- Per-Spek-Tiv — Louis Clark — 1979
- Ocean Gypsy — Michael Dunford's Renaissance — 1997
- South of Winter - Renaissant - 2004
