= Annie Haslam =

English singer and painter (born 1947)

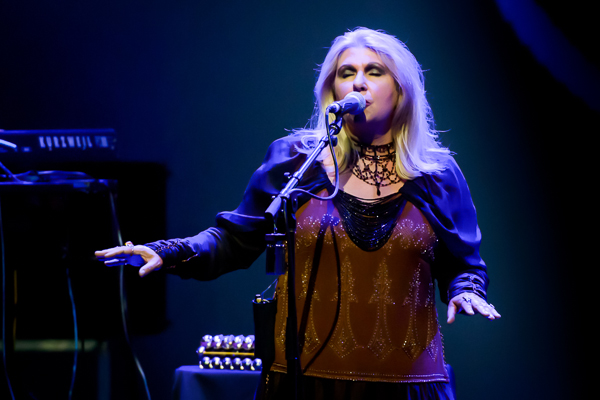
- Annie Haslam with Renaissance headlining North East Art Rock Festival (NEARfest) on 23 June 2012

Background information
- Born: Ann Haslam; 8 June 1947 (age 79)
- Origin: Bolton, Lancashire, England
- Genres: Progressive rock; pop; folk; classical
- Occupations: Singer; painter; songwriter; arranger
- Instruments: Vocals; percussion
- Years active: 1971–present
- Labels: White Dove; Sire; Warner Bros.; Epic; Epic (Japan); Voiceprint; Transatlantic; Cherry Red
- Website: anniehaslam.com

Annie Haslam (born 8 June 1947) is an English vocalist, songwriter and painter. She is best known as the lead singer of progressive rock band Renaissance since 1971, and for her long and diverse solo singing career. She has a five-octave vocal range. In 2026, Loudwire ranked her as the 3rd greatest progressive rock singer of all time.

From 2002, Haslam has developed a parallel career as a visual artist, producing paintings on canvas, painted musical instruments and giclées.

== Early history ==
At the age of ten, Haslam's parents enrolled her in elocution lessons, which Haslam cites as being the foundation of her singing career.

After studying fashion at Redruth Art School in Cornwall, Haslam began working as an assistant at fashion company Jaeger and then became an apprentice at David Coombs, a Savile Row tailor in London. There, she overheard the Beatles' 1969 rooftop concert while on the street during her lunch break. Haslam then briefly worked for fashion company Windsmoor, which asked her to create a book containing her ideas for dress designs and then fired her immediately after she completed it. Haslam believes that Windsmoor "stole [her] designs"; this caused her to lose interest in dressmaking.

Haslam's boyfriend, Eric Peacock, heard her singing along with other people at a party and started entering her into vocal talent competitions, which she "kept winning". Sonia,who was girlfriend of Haslam's brother Michael urged Haslam to take voice lessons from teacher Harold Miller. Miller liked her voice, but because Haslam had a day job and Miller did not offer evening lessons, Miller referred Haslam to opera singer Sybil Knight. Haslam spent nine months taking voice lessons with Knight in 1970.

As her first professional singing job, Haslam spent a year singing at a dinner/cabaret club named Showboat in the Strand in London's West End with the band The Gentle People. Guitarist David Gardner then told Haslam that her potential was being wasted in cabaret and he showed Haslam an advertisement in Melody Maker: 'International pop group looking for female singer'. Haslam called to find out the name of the group (it was Renaissance) and she bought its first album Renaissance. Haslam quickly learned every song in preparation for her audition on 31 December 1970. For her audition, Haslam was asked to sing the song "Island". The next day, Haslam joined Renaissance, and she went on tour with the band in Germany three weeks later.

== Career with Renaissance ==
In 1971, Haslam became the new lead singer of Renaissance after answering an advertisement in the British periodical Melody Maker and auditioning for the band in Surrey. Charles Snider stated: "Annie Haslam's voice, soaring high along with the melody, is the big news. Far more West End than Carnaby Street, it would come to define the band."

With Renaissance, Haslam was lead vocalist on seven studio albums during their classic period (1972–1979), four studio albums from 1981–present, and a number of live albums. In August 1978 the band's single "Northern Lights" reached the top 10 in the UK singles chart.

In 2018, Haslam provided her perspective on her work with Renaissance: "I love all the albums from Prologue to A Song for All Seasons [including Ashes Are Burning, Turn of the Cards, Scheherazade and Other Stories, Live at Carnegie Hall, and Novella]. I think they are masterpieces. Azure d'Or is okay, the changes within the band and sound started with this album... I felt we were going in the wrong direction and away from our roots... Jon Camp led us into another style of music taking us away from our identity along the way. These were the [albums] Camera Camera and Time-Line. Personally, I feel we shouldn't have abandoned who we were and our heritage".

== Solo career ==
In 1977, Haslam began her solo career with her album Annie in Wonderland, produced by Roy Wood, who played most of the musical instruments and duetted with her on one track. The same year she performed on one track from the Intergalactic Touring Band album. She has since released eight studio albums, three of which were released through her own record label, White Dove. Haslam has also collaborated with Steve Howe on a number of projects. Her 2006 Live Studio Concert, was also released as her first solo DVD. Haslam released an EP called Night and Day, her first solo recording for some years, with Welsh rock band Magenta in 2006.

== Visual arts ==
"Haslam as few among us, is blessed to channel her muse in a variety of ways" wrote Melinda Rizzo in Fine Art Magazine. One of these is visual arts:

- her paintings have been used as cover art on the albums:
  - One Enchanted Evening, by Annie Haslam
  - Woman Transcending by Annie Haslam –
  - Night and Day by Annie Haslam with Magenta
  - Grandine il Vento / Symphony of Light by Renaissance
  - Speak by I and Thou
  - Song of Times by Starcastle
- she has helped others to design her on-stage clothing
- she has painted musical instruments including guitars, and violins
- she has created giclées of many of her paintings
- in 1975 she artistically hand-lettered the lyrics to "Mother Russia" for a British tour program.

== Festive season concert ==
Starting in 1999, Haslam has, each year, performed a Christmas show called In the Spirit of the Holidays, originally at the Upper Tinicum Lutheran Church, and then at the larger Sellersville Theatre in Sellersville, Pennsylvania, since 2006. The Christmas show has been held every year except 2012, due to the death of her friend and colleague, Michael Dunford, in November of that year. Haslam stated that "there was just too much sadness at the time". Included in the program are secular, and religious Christmas carols, as well as her own compositions, and some Renaissance songs.

== Personal life ==
Regarding her first name, Haslam said in 1993 that "I was 'our Anne' to my Mum and Dad, but to everyone else I was Annie".

Haslam grew up in a working-class family. Her father, an amateur comedian-singer, died of cancer.

Haslam's brother Keith Haslam was a graphic designer who lived in Toronto.

Michael Haslam, also Haslam's brother, was also a successful singer. Michael had been discovered and signed by Brian Epstein and released his first single "Gotta Get a Hold of Myself", before performing as an opening act for the Beatles in December 1964.

Haslam has been a vegetarian since the late 1980s. In 1993, Haslam was diagnosed with breast cancer, which she survived and which became the inspiration for her 1994 album, Blessing in Disguise.

Haslam was engaged to musician Roy Wood for four years, which she later described as "four of the funniest years of my life". In 1991, Haslam married Marc I. Hoffman of North Wales, Pennsylvania. The marriage ended in divorce, but Haslam says "I believe my ex-husband came into my life to save it, because I had breast cancer after we were married and was immediately taken care of so well". She now resides in Bucks County, Pennsylvania.

== Solo discography ==
- Annie in Wonderland (1977)
- Still Life (1985)
- Annie Haslam (1989)
- Blessing in Disguise (1994)
- Supper's Ready: (Genesis tribute Album) (guest vocalist on "Ripples") (1995)
- Tales From Yesterday (Yes tribute Album) (guest vocalist on "Turn Of The Century") (1995)
- Live Under Brazilian Skies (1998)
- The Dawn of Ananda (1999)
- Portraits of Bob Dylan by Steve Howe (album) (guest vocalist on "It's All Over Now Baby Blue") (1999)
- It Snows in Heaven Too (2000)
- One Enchanted Evening (2002)
- Icon by John Wetton & Geoff Downes (album) (guest vocalist) (2005)
- Miles of Music by Bob Miles (guest vocalist) (2006)
- Live Studio Concert (2006)
- Night and Day EP with Magenta written for Haslam by Rob Reed and Christina Booth (2006)
- Woman Transcending (2007)
- Hurry Up And Smell The Roses by Tom Brislin (guest vocalist on "I Hold A Candle") (2012)
- Songs of the Century (Supertramp tribute album) (guest vocalist on "Dreamer") (2012)
- 'Live' Studio Concert Philadelphia 1997 (Re-release) (2014)
- "Don't Give Up" (single), (duet with Jann Klose) (2017)
