= The Best of Rod Stewart (1976 album) =

Greatest hits album by Rod Stewart
- Released: 1976
- Recorded: 1969–1974
- Genres: Rock, pop
- Length: 80:16 (LP) 76:56 (CD)
- Label: Mercury Records
- Producers: Rod Stewart & Ron Wood

Rod Stewart chronology
Atlantic Crossing (1975)	The Best of Rod Stewart (1976)	A Night on the Town (1976)

Professional ratings
Review scores
Source	Rating
AllMusic	4.5/5 stars
Christgau's Record Guide	B+
The Rolling Stone Album Guide	3/5 stars

The Best of Rod Stewart is a compilation album of songs by Rod Stewart released on Mercury Records in 1976 to complete Stewart’s contract before switching labels to Warner Bros. and moving to The United States. It includes tracks from all his Mercury albums and some non-album singles from the same time period.

== Release ==
The Best of Rod Stewart was released as a double album. It was re-released on Compact Disc in 1998 with all 18 tracks on a single disc. In order to fit the album onto one 80-minute CD, "Maggie May" was edited from 5:46 to 5:14, and the album version of "It's All Over Now" (6:23) was replaced with the single version (3:35).

"Oh! No Not My Baby" and was originally released, with its B-side "Jodie" being credited to Stewart's band Faces. All other tracks were from previously released Rod Stewart solo albums. The original compilation reached #18 in the UK and #19 on the US charts.

== Track listing ==
1. "Maggie May" (previously released on Every Picture Tells a Story) – 5:14
2. "Cut Across Shorty" (previously released on Gasoline Alley) – 6:30
3. "An Old Raincoat Won't Ever Let You Down" (previously released on An Old Raincoat Won't Ever Let You Down) – 3:30
4. "(I Know) I'm Losing You" (previously released on Every Picture Tells a Story) – 5:21
5. "Handbags and Gladrags" (previously released on An Old Raincoat Won't Ever Let You Down) – 4:24
6. "It's All Over Now" (single released in support of Gasoline Alley; the album cut of this song is longer) – 3:35
7. "Street Fighting Man" (previously released on An Old Raincoat Won't Ever Let You Down) – 5:05
8. "Gasoline Alley" (previously released on Gasoline Alley) – 4:02
9. "Every Picture Tells a Story" (previously released on Every Picture Tells a Story) – 5:57
10. "What's Made Milwaukee Famous (Has Made a Loser Out of Me)" (previously released as the UK B-side of "Angel") – 3:24
11. "Oh! No Not My Baby" (previously released as a non-album single) – 3:38
12. "Jodie" (previously released as the B-side of "Oh! No Not My Baby," by the Faces) – 3:09
13. "You Wear It Well" (previously released on Never a Dull Moment) – 4:22
14. "Let Me Be Your Car" (previously released on Smiler) – 4:57
15. "Pinball Wizard" (previously released on Sing It Again Rod) – 3:10
16. "Sailor" (previously released on Smiler) – 3:34
17. "Angel" (previously released on Never a Dull Moment) – 4:03
18. "Mine for Me" (previously released on Smiler) – 4:00

== Personnel ==
- Produced by Rod Stewart, Ron Wood, and Lou Reizner
- Mastering by Suha Gur
- Artwork by Joe Kotleba
- Photography by Aaron Sixx
- Illustrations by John Youssi
- See original releases for more personnel

== Charts ==
=== Weekly charts ===
Chart (1977)	Peak position
New Zealand Albums (RMNZ)	9
UK Albums (Official Charts)	21
Chart (1992)	Peak position
New Zealand Albums (RMNZ)	19

=== Year-end charts ===
Chart (1977)	Position
UK Albums (OCC)	41
