= Sing It Again Rod =

Compilation album by Rod Stewart
- Released: 10 August 1973
- Studio: Olympic Studios, London; Lansdowne Studios, London; Morgan Studios, London
- Genre: Rock; pop; folk rock; blue-eyed soul
- Length: 51:54
- Label: Mercury
- Producer: Rod Stewart

Rod Stewart chronology
Never a Dull Moment (1972)	Sing It Again Rod (1973)	Smiler (1974)

Professional ratings
Review scores
Source	Rating
AllMusic	3/5 stars
Christgau's Record Guide	B+
Rolling Stone	(favourable)

Sing It Again Rod is the first compilation album by Rod Stewart released in 1972. The album is notable for its Peter Corriston-designed die-cut album sleeve (shaped like an old fashioned glass, and through which a smiling Stewart can be seen).

== Track listing ==
1. "Reason to Believe" (Tim Hardin) from the album Every Picture Tells A Story
2. "You Wear It Well" (Rod Stewart, Martin Quittenton) from the album Never a Dull Moment
3. "Mandolin Wind" (Rod Stewart) from the album Every Picture Tells A Story
4. "Country Comfort" (Elton John, Bernie Taupin) from the album Gasoline Alley
5. "Maggie May" (includes "Henry" instrumental intro) (Rod Stewart, Martin Quittenton) from the album Every Picture Tells A Story
6. "Handbags and Gladrags" (Mike d'Abo) from the album An Old Raincoat Won't Ever Let You Down
7. "Street Fighting Man" (Mick Jagger, Keith Richards) from the album An Old Raincoat Won't Ever Let You Down
8. "Twistin' the Night Away" (Sam Cooke) from the album Never a Dull Moment
9. "Lost Paraguayos" (Rod Stewart, Ron Wood) from the album Never a Dull Moment
10. "(I Know) I'm Losing You" (Norman Whitfield, Eddie Holland, Cornelius Grant) from the album Every Picture Tells A Story
11. "Pinball Wizard" (Pete Townshend) from the album Tommy
12. "Gasoline Alley" (Rod Stewart, Ron Wood) from the album Gasoline Alley

== Personnel ==
- Album design – "Shakey Pete Corriston" (Peter Corriston)
- Photography – Cosimo Scianna, Emerson, Loew and Steve Azzara

== Charts ==
Chart (1973)	Peak position
Australian Albums (Kent Music Report)	11
United Kingdom (UK Albums Chart)]	1

== Certifications ==
Region	Certification	Certified units/sales
New Zealand (RMNZ)	Gold	7,500^{^}
United Kingdom (BPI)	Gold	100,000^{^}
United States (RIAA)	Gold	500,000^{^}
^{^} Shipments figures based on certification alone.
