= Unplugged...and Seated =

Live album by Rod Stewart
- Released: 24 May 1993
- Recorded: 5 February 1993, Universal Studios, Los Angeles, California
- Genres: Rock; pop
- Length: 69:57
- Label: Warner Bros.
- Producer: Patrick Leonard

Rod Stewart chronology
Lead Vocalist (1993)	Unplugged...and Seated (1993)	A Spanner in the Works (1995)

Professional ratings
Review scores
Source	Rating
AllMusic	3/5 stars
Calgary Herald	C
Entertainment Weekly	B+
Q	3/5 stars
Robert Christgau	(3-star Honorable Mention)
Rolling Stone	3/5 stars
Select	2/5 medals

Unplugged...and Seated is a live album released by British musician Rod Stewart on 24 May 1993 by Warner Bros. Records. It is Stewart's second live album and his first (and only) appearance on MTV Unplugged. The unplugged versions of "Have I Told You Lately" by Van Morrison, "Reason to Believe", "Having a Party", and "People Get Ready" were released as singles, with "Have I Told You Lately" and "Having a Party" reaching success as singles. A special collector's edition was released in March 2009 on Rhino Records. This two-disc package included a DVD of the performance with 13 songs while the CD contained 17 tracks including two songs ("Gasoline Alley" and "Forever Young") not on the original 1993 release.

== Album information ==
The album was recorded on 5 February 1993 at Universal Studios, Los Angeles as part of MTV's Unplugged series. The event aired on television on 5 May of the same year. Unplugged finds Stewart reunited, for the first time in nearly twenty years, with Ronnie Wood, a fellow Faces band member. Stewart performs some of the classics from his repertoire such as "Tonight's the Night" and "Maggie May", but also adds some new material such as "Having a Party" and "Highgate Shuffle". The album title comes from a joke Stewart made during the taping about "Stay with Me" being difficult to perform while sitting down. Four songs were taped but not included on the subsequent album release although "It's All Over Now" was included as the B-side to the single for "Reason to Believe".

== Track listing ==
=== CD release ===
1. "Hot Legs" (Rod Stewart, Gary Grainger) – 4:25
  - (studio version previously released on Foot Loose & Fancy Free)
2. "Tonight's the Night" (Stewart) – 4:04
  - (studio version previously released on A Night on the Town)
3. "Handbags and Gladrags" (Mike d'Abo) – 4:25
  - (studio version previously released on An Old Raincoat Won't Ever Let You Down)
4. "Cut Across Shorty" (Wayne Walker, Marijohn Wilkin) – 4:58
  - (studio version previously released on Gasoline Alley)
5. "Every Picture Tells a Story" (Stewart, Ron Wood) – 4:45
  - (studio version previously released on Every Picture Tells a Story)
6. "Maggie May" (Stewart, Martin Quittenton) – 5:45
  - (studio version previously released on Every Picture Tells a Story)
7. "Reason to Believe" (Tim Hardin) – 4:07
  - (studio version previously released on Every Picture Tells a Story)
8. "People Get Ready" (Curtis Mayfield) – 4:59
  - (studio version previously released as a single with Jeff Beck)
9. "Have I Told You Lately" (Van Morrison) – 4:08
  - (studio version previously released on Vagabond Heart)
10. "Tom Traubert's Blues (Waltzing Matilda)" (Tom Waits) – 4:40
  - (studio version previously released on Lead Vocalist)
11. "The First Cut Is the Deepest" (Cat Stevens) – 4:12
  - (studio version previously released on A Night on the Town)
12. "Mandolin Wind" (Stewart) – 5:23
  - (studio version previously released on Every Picture Tells a Story)
13. "Highgate Shuffle" (arrangement by Stewart) – 3:54
  - (previously unreleased)
14. "Stay with Me" (Stewart, Wood) – 5:27
  - (studio version previously released on A Nod Is as Good as a Wink...To a Blind Horse by Faces)
15. "Having a Party" (Sam Cooke) – 4:44
  - (previously unreleased)
16. "Gasoline Alley" (Stewart, Wood)
  - (bonus track on the "Unplugged…and Seated Collector’s Edition")
  - (studio version previously released on Gasoline Alley)
17. "Forever Young" (Stewart, Jim Cregan, Kevin Savigar)
  - (bonus track on the "Unplugged…and Seated Collector’s Edition")
  - (studio version previously released on Out of Order)

=== Live performance ===
1. "Hot Legs"
2. "Tonight's the Night"
3. "Cut Across Shorty" (feat. Ron Wood)
4. "Reason to Believe" (feat. Ron Wood)
5. "It's All Over Now" (Bobby Womack, Shirley Womack) (feat. Ron Wood)
  - (studio version previously released on Gasoline Alley)
6. "Every Picture Tells a Story" (feat. Ron Wood)
7. "Maggie May" (feat. Ron Wood)
8. "People Get Ready" (feat. Ron Wood)
9. "Handbags and Gladrags"
10. "The Killing of Georgie" (Stewart)
  - (studio version previously released on A Night on the Town)
11. "Have I Told You Lately" (Van Morrison)
12. "Tom Traubert's Blues (Waltzing Matilda)"
13. "Forever Young" (Stewart, Jim Cregan, Kevin Savigar)
14. "First Cut Is the Deepest"
15. "I Was Only Joking" (Stewart, Grainger)
  - (studio version previously released on Foot Loose & Fancy Free)
16. "Gasoline Alley" (Stewart, Wood) (feat. Ron Wood)
17. "Highgate Shuffle" (feat. Ron Wood)
18. "Sweet Little Rock 'n' Roller" (Chuck Berry) (feat. Ron Wood)
  - (studio version previously released on Smiler)
19. "Mandolin Wind" (feat. Ron Wood)
20. "Stay with Me" (feat. Ron Wood)
21. "Having a Party" (feat. Ron Wood)

== Personnel ==
- Rod Stewart – lead vocals, banjo
- Ronnie Wood – guitar
- Jeff Golub – guitar
- Jim Cregan – guitar
- Don Teschner – guitar, mandolin, violin
- Carmine Rojas – bass guitar
- David Palmer - drums
- Charles Kentiss III – piano, organ
- Kevin Savigar – piano, organ, accordion
- Phil Parlapiano – accordion, mandolin
- Dorian Holley, Darryl Phinnessee, Fred White – backing vocals
- Strings arranged and conducted by Jeremy Lubbock
- Additional members of the band: Marilyn Baker, Haim Shtrum, Mari Tsumura, Jay Rosen, Kwihee Shamban, Miran Kojian, Brian Leonard, Jean Hugo, Joel Derouin, Bruce Dukov, Joseph Meyer, Ronald Clark, Joan Elardo, David Shostac, Norman Ludwin, Drew Dembowski, David Shamban, Suzie Katayama, James Ross, Larry Corbett.

=== Production ===
- Michael Ostin – executive production
- Joel Stillerman – executive production
- Patrick Leonard – music producer
- Alex Coletti – production
- Audrey Johns – production
- Milt Lage – directing
- Jerry Jordan – engineering
- Charlie Bouis – assistant engineering
- David Gallo – assistant engineering
- Marc Moreau – assistant engineering
- Doug Sax – mastering
- Neal Preston – photography
- Greg Ross – design

== Charts ==
=== Weekly charts ===
Chart (1993)	Peak position
Australian Albums (ARIA)	4
Austrian Albums (Ö3 Austria)	7
Canada Top Albums/CDs (RPM)	1
Dutch Albums (Album Top 100)	17
German Albums (Offizielle Top 100)	15
New Zealand Albums (RMNZ)	13
Swedish Albums (Sverigetopplistan)	8
Swiss Albums (Schweizer Hitparade)	16
UK Albums (Official Charts)	2
US Billboard 200	2

=== Year-end charts ===
Chart (1993)	Position
Australian Albums (ARIA)	35
Canada Top Albums/CDs (RPM)	6
Dutch Albums (Album Top 100)	65
German Albums (Offizielle Top 100)	59
US Billboard 200	22

== Certifications ==
Region	Certification	Certified units/sales
Argentina (CAPIF)	Gold	30,000^{^}
Australia (ARIA)	Platinum	70,000^{^}
Canada (Music Canada)	3× Platinum	300,000^{^}
Germany (BVMI)	Gold	250,000^{^}
Japan (RIAJ)	Gold	100,000^{^}
New Zealand (RMNZ)	Gold	7,500^{^}
Spain (Promusicae)	Gold	50,000^{^}
United Kingdom (BPI)	Platinum	300,000^{^}
United States (RIAA)	3× Platinum	3,000,000^{^}
^{^} Shipments figures based on certification alone.
