= Every Picture Tells a Story (song) =

Single by Rod Stewart

from the album Every Picture Tells a Story
- B-side: "Reason to Believe"
- Released: 1972
- Genre: Rock
- Length: 5:59
- Label: Mercury
- Songwriters: Rod Stewart; Ronnie Wood
- Producer: Rod Stewart

Rod Stewart singles chronology
"Reason to Believe" (1971)	"Every Picture Tells a Story" (1972)	"(I Know) I'm Losing You" (1971)

"Every Picture Tells a Story" is a song written by Rod Stewart and Ronnie Wood and initially released as the title track of Stewart's 1971 album Every Picture Tells a Story. It has since become one of Stewart's signature songs and released on numerous Stewart compilation and live albums, including The Best of Rod Stewart, Storyteller – The Complete Anthology: 1964–1990 and Unplugged...and Seated. It was released as a single in Spain, Portugal and Japan, backed with "Reason to Believe". It has also been covered by the Georgia Satellites on their 1986 album Georgia Satellites and by Robin McAuley on Forever Mod: A Tribute to Rod Stewart.

== Background and structure ==
The lyrics of "Every Picture Tells a Story" form a first-person narrative of the singer finding adventures with women all over the world but eventually returning home after having learned some moral lessons. Locations of his adventures include Paris, Rome and Peking.

In his review of the album in Rolling Stone, John Mendelsohn noted that this song "does rock with ferocity via a simple but effective seven-note ascension/five-note descension riff that Waller cleverly punctuates with a halved-time bass-drum-against-snare lick." The rhythm is loose throughout most of the song, although it tightens in the coda. Stewart biographers Tim Ewbank and Stafford Hildred describe the music as "a mess — unbalanced and shoddily thrown together," although the "vocals pull the song out of trouble." Despite being a hard rock song, the song primarily uses acoustic instruments, although guitarist Ron Wood does use an electric guitar occasionally. Pete Sears played the acoustic piano. The song's music incorporates many elements. Toby Creswell describes the opening guitar theme as reflective and melancholy. As the guitar opening fades, the drums played by Micky Waller crash primitively before Stewart begins to sing. Greil Marcus also praises the acoustic guitar parts that are played after each verse and the drum roll after the first verse.

According to Stewart, he found the mandolin and violin players for this song and for "Maggie May" in a restaurant in London. Maggie Bell and Long John Baldry provide energetic harmony vocals, including the line "She claimed that it just ain't natural" in response to Stewart's line "Shanghai Lil never used the pill." Allmusic's Sullivan describes the song as "just plain visceral -- so much so that [it is] better heard than described" and that it represents six minutes of "defining rock & roll."

The song's lyrics are entirely free-form in that they do not follow any consistent rhythmic meter and read almost like prose. Rhyming only appears occasionally and irregularly, sometimes as internal rhymes within a line ("On the Peking ferry I was feeling merry", "Shanghai Lil never used the pill"). There are somewhat more near-rhymes between lines (inferior/mirror, ways/same, stampede/tea, funk/luck, attraction/sanction), but these too are unpredictable and occasional. The lyrics even exhibit occasional elements of subtle vowel alliteration ("I firmly believed that I didn't need anyone but me"). Stewart's confident performance, however, renders these shortcomings of rhyme and rhythm unnoticeable to the listener; the song sounds like it does have lyrical rhyme and rhythm.

== Analysis and reception ==
In the Rolling Stone Album Guide, critic Paul Evans described "Every Picture Tells a Story" and "Maggie May", another song off the Every Picture Tells a Story album, as Rod Stewart's and Ron Wood's "finest hour—happy lads wearing their hearts on their sleeves." Music critic Greil Marcus regards the song as "Rod Stewart's greatest performance."

Allmusic critic Denise Sullivan commented that some of the lyrics are racist and sexist (e.g., describing an Asian woman as a "slit-eyed lady"), and that the song "is a real nugget from a brief period in time when rock singers didn't worry about what it meant to be rude -- in fact, the ruder and cruder, the better."

However, a live version of the song performed by Stewart in 1992, 21 years after the original album version was released, skips a complete verse containing some particularly unkind and crude references to women, as well as a self-deprecating reference: "I firmly believed that I/Didn't need anyone but me/I sincerely felt I was so complete/Look how wrong you can be/The women I've known I wouldn't let tie my shoe/They wouldn't give you the time of day/But the slit-eyed lady knocked me off my feet/God I was so glad I found her".

Allmusic editor Stephen Thomas Erlewine praised the song as "devilishly witty." The lyrics begin with a reference to the theme of self-discovery:

Spent some time feeling inferior
Standing in front of my mirror
Combed my hair in a thousand ways
But I came out looking just the same

== In other media ==
"Every Picture Tells a Story" was used in the Cameron Crowe movie Almost Famous in a scene where main characters William and Penny walk through the halls of a hotel. It was also included in the opening scene of the third episode of Mayor of Kingstown and was also featured on the soundtrack of the video game Grand Theft Auto IV: The Lost and Damned.

The song was also referenced in Jayne Anne Phillips' short story "What It Takes to Keep a Young Girl Alive." While the story's character Sue is lying in bed in the dark "Rod Stewart, scratchy and loud, combed his hair in a thousand different ways and came out looking just the same." Greil Marcus uses the reference to the song in "What It Takes to Keep a Young Girl Alive" to muse on what makes a good record and why "Every Picture Tells a Story" is a good record, i.e., a good record is one that "entering a person's life, can enable that person to live more intensely — as, whatever else it does, 'Every Picture Tells a Story' does for Jayne Anne Phillips' Sue."

== Personnel ==
- Rod Stewart – lead vocals, backing vocals
- Ronnie Wood – electric guitar, twelve-string guitar, bass guitar, backing vocals
- Pete Sears – piano
- Micky Waller – drums
- Ian McLagan – Hammond organ, backing vocals
- Long John Baldry, Maggie Bell, Mateus Rose, Kenney Jones, Ronnie Lane – backing vocals
