= Methuselah (disambiguation) =

Methuselah, a Biblical figure, was known for living a long time.

Methuselah may also refer to:

== Arts, entertainment, and media ==
=== Fictional characters and creatures ===
- Methuselah (Redwall), a character in the Redwall novels by Brian Jacques
- Methuselah (Trinity Blood), a fictional offshoot of humanity that appear in the anime Trinity Blood
- Methuselah (World of Darkness), a vampire at least a millennium old in White Wolf's novels, RPGs and playable cards
- Methuselah, the nickname of Rain Jewlitt, a 624-year-old character in the Immortal Rain manga
- Methuselah, the Price family's pet parrot in Barbara Kingsolver's The Poisonwood Bible
- Methuselah, a Titan from the MonsterVerse film Godzilla: King of the Monsters

=== Music ===
- Methuselah (band), an English 1960s rock band
- Methuselah (album), a 1969 rock album by Methuselah
- Methuselah, the sixth track on San Fermin's 2013 album San Fermin

== Science and technology ==
- Methuselah (cellular automaton), a long-surviving pattern in Conway's Game of Life
- Methuselah-like proteins, insect proteins that extend the life span of the animal
- Methuselah Nebula, nickname for MWP 1, a large planetary nebula
- Methuselah (planet), nickname for PSR B1620-26 b, one of the oldest exoplanets
- Methuselah Star, nickname for HD 140283, one of the oldest stars known
- The Methuselah Foundation, a biomedical charitable organization dedicated to extending healthy life

== Long-lived organisms ==
- Methuselah (lungfish), the oldest living fish in captivity
- Methuselah (Judean date palm), a palm tree grown from a 2000-year-old seed at Ketura, Israel
- Methuselah (pine tree), the second oldest known Great Basin bristlecone pine tree in the White Mountains of California, the second oldest known living tree
- Methuselah (sequoia tree), the 27th largest tree in the world, in Sequoia National Forest, California

== Other uses ==
- Methuselah (bond), a financial instrument with a 50-year maturity
- Methuselah (unit), a UK bottle size for wine

== See also ==
- Methuselah's Children, Robert A. Heinlein science fiction novel featuring a long-lived family
- "Requiem for Methuselah", Star Trek television episode featuring a long-lived character whose many identities include the biblical Methuselah
