= Mk II (album) =

Studio album by Steamhammer
- Released: February 1970
- Recorded: 1969
- Genre: Progressive; jazz fusion; blues
- Label: CBS
- Producer: Fritz Fryer & John Hawkins

Steamhammer chronology
| Steamhammer (1969) | Mk II (1970) | Mountains (1970) |

Professional ratings
Review scores
| Source | Rating |
|---|---|
| Allmusic | 4/5 stars |

Mk II was the second album of the British rock band Steamhammer.

== Background ==
For this LP, drummer Michael Ruston was replaced by Mick Bradley (who stayed with the band through to their final LP in 1972, Speech). Guitarist Martin Quittenton had also departed, to focus on songwriting (primarily with Rod Stewart) and sax and flute player Steve Jolliffe was added to the lineup (he later joined Tangerine Dream).

== Track listing ==
Side one
| No. | Title | Writer(s) | Length |
|---|---|---|---|
| 1. | "Supposed to Be Free" | Kieran White | 5:59 |
| 2. | "Johnny Carl Morton" | Steve Jolliffe | 4:38 |
| 3. | "Sunset Chase" | Martin Pugh | 3:02 |
| 4. | "Contemporary Chick Con Song" | Steamhammer | 3:49 |
| 5. | "Turn Around" | Jolliffe | 3:36 |
| 6. | "6/8 for Amiran" | White, Jolliffe | 3:04 |

Side two
| No. | Title | Writer(s) | Length |
|---|---|---|---|
| 7. | "Passing Through" | White | 5:17 |
| 8. | "Down Along the Grove" | White | 0:47 |
| 9. | "Another Travelling Tune" | White, Pugh | 16:23 |
| 10. | "Fran and Dee Take a Ride" | White | 2:58 |

Bonus tracks on CD releases
| No. | Title | Writer(s) | Length |
|---|---|---|---|
| 11. | "Junior's Wailing" | White, Pugh | 3:30 |
| 12. | "Windmill" | White, Martin Quittenton | 4:28 |
| 13. | "Autumn Song" | White, Jolliffe | 4:09 |
| 14. | "Blues for Passing People" | Steamhammer | 6:26 |

== Personnel ==
=== Band members ===
- Kieran White - vocals, acoustic guitar, harmonica, jew's harp
- Steve Jolliffe - soprano and alto flutes, alto and tenor saxophones, harpsichord, vocals
- Martin Pugh - electric and acoustic guitar
- Steve Davy - bass
- Mick Bradley - drums, percussion, conga

=== Additional personnel ===
- Fritz Fryer - Producer
- John Hawkins - Producer
- Paul Tregurtha - Engineer
- Mike Bobak - Engineer

== Product details ==
- Audio CD (July 18, 2006)
- Original release date: 1969
- Number of discs: 1
- Format: Import
- Label: Repertoire
- ASIN: B000025R1K
