= Speech (Steamhammer album) =

Studio album by Steamhammer
- Released: Early 1972
- Recorded: Winter 1971
- Genre: Progressive rock
- Labels: Brain; Metronome
- Producers: Steamhammer; Keith Relf

Steamhammer chronology
Mountains (1970)	Speech (1972)	Wailing Again (2022)

Professional ratings
Review scores
Source	Rating
Allmusic	3.5/5 stars

Speech is the fourth album by the British rock band Steamhammer.

In 1971, bassist Steve Davy left the band, and Louis Cennamo was recruited as his replacement - then, vocalist/guitarist Kieran White also left after a summer tour. Guitarist Martin Pugh, drummer Mick Bradley and Cennamo (with guest vocalist Garth Watt-Roy, of Fuzzy Duck) then went in the studio to record Speech, which was released in 1972.

Bradley died from leukemia shortly before the album's mixing was completed (the album is dedicated to him on the inside album cover). The band continued with American singer/guitarist Bruce Payne and drummer John Lingwood, touring in Germany in support of the album, where they were more popular than back home in England.

After Steamhammer wound down, Pugh and Cennamo joined up with former Yardbirds vocalist Keith Relf (who had provided production assistance on Speech, as well as contributing background vocals) and drummer Bobby Caldwell, formerly of Johnny Winter's band and Captain Beyond, to form Armageddon.

== Track listing ==
Side 1
No.	Title	Writer(s)	Length
1.	"Penumbra": "Entrance"; "Battlements"; "Passage to Remorse"; "Sightless Substance"; "Mortal Thought"	Martin Pugh, Louis Cennamo, Mick Bradley; lyrics by Elizabeth Romilly	22:42

Side 2
No.	Title	Writer(s)	Length
2.	"Telegram (Nature's Mischief)"	Pugh, Cennamo, Bradley; lyrics by Karl Williams	12:00
3.	"For Against"	Pugh, Cennamo, Bradley	10:58

== Personnel ==
- Martin Pugh - guitar, vocals
- Louis Cennamo - bass, bowed bass, vocals
- Mick Bradley - percussion
- Garth Watt-Roy - lead vocals

Technical

- Keith Relf - backing vocals, production assistance
- Pete Booth - engineer
- Paul Whitehead - cover art

== Product details ==
- Audio CD (1991)
- Original release date: 1972
- Number of discs: 1
- Format: Import
- Label: Repertoire (CD reissue)
- ASIN: B00000743R

Also:

- Audio CD (October 11, 2005)
- Original release date: 1972
- Number of discs: 1
- Label: Akarma Italy
- ASIN: B00009Y34Y
