= Fuzzy Duck =

Fuzzy Duck may refer to:

- Fuzzy Duck (band), a progressive rock band from the UK
  - Fuzzy Duck (album), their self-titled sole album
- Fuzzy duck, a drinking game
