= Mountains (Steamhammer album) =

Studio album by Steamhammer
- Released: November 1970
- Recorded: 1970
- Genre: Progressive rock; hard rock
- Length: 41:27
- Label: B&C Records
- Producer: Fritz Fryer

Steamhammer chronology
Mk II (1969)	Mountains (1970)	Speech (1972)

Professional ratings
Review scores
Source	Rating
AllMusic	2/5 stars

Mountains is the third album by British rock band Steamhammer. Steamhammer recorded this album as a quartet, Kieran White (vocals, guitar, harmonica), Martin Pugh (guitar), Steve Davy (bass) and Mick Bradley (drums) in mid-1970.

"Riding on the L&N" and "Hold That Train" were recorded live at the Lyceum Theatre in London.

== Track listing (original release) ==
All songs written by Kieran White, except where noted.

1. "I Wouldn't Have Thought (Gophers Song)" (White, Martin Pugh)
2. "Levinia"
3. "Henry Lane"
4. "Walking Down the Road"
5. "Mountains"
6. "Leader of the Ring"
7. "Riding on the L&N"* (Dan Burley, Lionel Hampton)
8. "Hold That Train"* (White, Pugh, Mick Bradley, Steve Davy)

*Recorded live at the Lyceum Theatre, London.

== Personnel ==
=== Band members ===
- Kieran White - lead vocals, acoustic and rhythm guitar, harmonica
- Martin Pugh - lead, acoustic and slide guitars
- Steve Davy - bass, backing vocals, organ
- Mick Bradley - drums, percussion

=== Additional musicians ===
- Keith Nelson - banjo (3)

=== Additional personnel ===
- Fritz Fryer - producer.
- Martin Birch - recording and mixing engineer.
