= Steamhammer =

Steamhammer may refer to:

- Steam hammer, an industrial steam-powered hammer
- Steam hammer, a phenomenon related to water hammer
- Steamhammer (band), an English rock band
  - Steamhammer (album) a 1969 album by Steamhammer
- Steamhammer (Transformers), a fictional character in the Transformers franchise
- Steamhammer Records, a subsidiary of the German record label SPV GmbH
