= The Best of Rod Stewart =

The Best of Rod Stewart may refer to:

- The Best of Rod Stewart (1976 album)
- The Best of Rod Stewart (1989 album)
