= Martin Pugh =

Martin Pugh may refer to:

- Martin Pugh (musician)
- Martin Pugh (historian)
