= Never a Dull Moment (Rod Stewart album) =

Studio album by Rod Stewart
- Released: 21 July 1972
- Recorded: March–May 1972
- Studios: Morgan and Olympic, London
- Genres: Rock and roll; blue-eyed soul; folk rock
- Length: 32:55
- Label: Mercury
- Producer: Rod Stewart

Rod Stewart chronology
Every Picture Tells a Story (1971)	Never a Dull Moment (1972)	Sing It Again Rod (1973)

Singles from Never a Dull Moment
- 1. "You Wear It Well" Released: August 1972; 2. "Angel" / "What's Made Milwaukee Famous" Released: November 1972; 3. "Twistin' the Night Away" Released: May 1973 (EU)

Never a Dull Moment is the fourth solo album by rock musician Rod Stewart. It was released on 21 July 1972; that year it became a UK number-one album (for two weeks) and reached number two on the US Album chart. The track "You Wear It Well", co-written by Stewart and classical guitarist Martin Quittenton, was a smash hit (another UK No. 1; in US No. 13), as well as "Twisting the Night Away", a song originally recorded (and written) by Sam Cooke.

== Recording ==
The album was recorded at Morgan and Olympic, London between March and May 1972.

Like many of Stewart's albums from the era, Never a Dull Moment features significant musical contributions from the members of the band Faces. Other guest musicians included Ray Jackson of the band Lindisfarne on mandolin, Spike Heatley on upright bass, Gordon Huntley on steel guitar, Dick Powell on violin and Pete Sears on piano and bass.

"Mama You Been on My Mind" is a cover version of a Bob Dylan song. Stewart's version is one of the songs featured in Nick Hornby's book 31 Songs.

"Angel" was written by Jimi Hendrix as a tribute to his mother. Hendrix and Ronnie Wood had shared a flat in the late 1960s, and were both at a Soho club on the night he died.

== Release ==
Never a Dull Moment was released on vinyl by Mercury Records on 21 July 1972.

On the 8-track tape and Cassette releases of the album the song "What Made Milwaukee Famous (Has Made a Loser Out of Me)" was on programme 2 following "Twistin' the Night Away", but it was not mentioned in the song listing.

== Reception ==
Professional ratings
Review scores
Source	Rating
AllMusic	5/5 stars
Christgau's Record Guide	A−
The Rolling Stone Album Guide	4/5 stars

== Track listing ==
Side one
No.	Title	Writer(s)	Length
1.	"True Blue"	Rod Stewart, Ronnie Wood	3:32
2.	"Lost Paraguayos"	Stewart, Wood	3:57
3.	"Mama, You Been on My Mind"	Bob Dylan	4:29
4.	"Italian Girls"	Stewart, Wood	4:54

Side two
No.	Title	Writer(s)	Length
1.	"Angel"	Jimi Hendrix	4:04
2.	"Interludings"	Art Wood	0:40
3.	"You Wear It Well"	Stewart, Martin Quittenton	4:22
4.	"I'd Rather Go Blind"	Billy Foster, Ellington Jordan	3:53
5.	"Twistin' the Night Away"	Sam Cooke	3:13
Total length:			32:55

== Personnel ==
- Rod Stewart – vocals, acoustic guitar
- Ronnie Wood – electric guitar, acoustic guitar, slide guitar, pedal steel guitar, bass guitar
- Ronnie Lane – bass guitar on "True Blue", and "Angel"
- Micky Waller – drums all songs except "True Blue"
- Kenney Jones – drums on "True Blue"
- Ian McLagan – Hammond organ, piano
- Neemoi "Speedy" Aquaye – congas
- Pete Sears – piano on “Italian Girls”, “What Made Milwaukee Famous” (single), bass guitar on “I’d Rather Go Blind”.
- Brian – piano
- Spike Heatley – upright bass
- Dick Powell – violin
- Martin Quittenton – acoustic guitar
- Gordon Huntley – steel guitar
- Ray Jackson – mandolin
- Arrangeables on "Twistin' the Night Away" by Jimmy Horowitz

== Charts ==
=== Weekly charts ===
Chart (1972–73)	Peak position
Australian Albums (Kent Music Report)	3
Canada Top Albums/CDs (RPM)	1
Finnish Albums (The Official Finnish Charts)	8
German Albums (Offizielle Top 100)	37
Italian Albums (Musica e Dischi)	22
Japanese Albums (Oricon)	56
Dutch Albums (Album Top 100)	2
Norwegian Albums (VG-lista)	8
Swedish Albums (Sverigetopplistan)	4
UK Albums (Official Charts)	1
US Billboard 200	2

=== Year-end charts ===
Chart (1972)	Position
Australian Albums (Kent Music Report)	18
Dutch Albums (Album Top 100)	15
UK Albums (OCC)	4

== Certifications ==
Region	Certification	Certified units/sales
New Zealand (RMNZ)	2× Gold	15,000^{^}
United Kingdom (BPI)	Gold	100,000^{^}
United States (RIAA)	Gold	500,000^{^}
^{^} Shipments figures based on certification alone.
