= Michael Rushton =

British drummer and vocalist (born 1950)

- Born: 1950 (age 75–76); Worthing, West Sussex, England
- Genres: Blues rock
- Instruments: Drums, vocals
- Years active: 1968–present

Michael Rushton (born 1950 in Worthing, West Sussex, England) is a British drummer and vocalist, known for being a member of the blues-rock band Steamhammer and later indie bands.

Rushton was a member of several rock and blues bands in the mid to late 1960s. Steamhammer was formed in 1968 in Worthing, Rushton's birthplace. He played drums on the debut 1969 Steamhammer album, a.k.a. Reflection.

Rushton is said to have been sacked from Steamhammer and Mick Bradley took over as the drummer for the band after him. Rushton went to France and joined The Holly Guns, which disbanded in 1971. Later he played in various indie bands during the 1980s onwards. He has been a drummer for Kids, drummer and vocalist for Baroque Bordello and Les Innocents. He is sometimes credited as "Michaël Rushton".
