= L'Autre Finistère =

1993 single by Les Innocents

Single by Les Innocents

from the album Fous à lier
- B-side: "En tapant du poing"
- Released: 1993
- Recorded: 1992
- Genre: Pop, chanson
- Length: 4:05
- Label: Virgin
- Songwriter(s): Les Innocents
- Producer(s): Philippe Delettrez

Les Innocents singles chronology
"Mon Dernier Soldat" (1992)	"L'Autre Finistère" (1993)	"Un Homme extraordinaire" (1993)

"L'Autre Finistère" is a 1992 pop song recorded by French act Les Innocents. Written and composed by the band members, it was the lead single from their second studio album Fous à lier, on which it appears as the fourth track, and was released in February 1993. Although it was difficult to write and to record, it achieved success in France where it was a top ten hit and became Les Innocents' one of the most well-known songs.

== Background and writing ==
Initially, Virgin, the record company, showed little interest in the first model of the song, titled "Jérémie le sacristin", so that the band members were demoralized and thought to withdraw their singing career, as Virgin expected for a hit. Lyricist Jean-Philippe Nataf, a band member, explained that he wrote a new version of the song in Charente, sitting in front of the sea, and kept the word "Finistère" in the title as it reminded him of his childhood holidays in this French department; additionally, he wanted to write a song about modest love. Thus "L'Autre Finistère" does not deal with Brittany, but has a universal significance as it refers to "a place that is specific to everyone [...] and where one can live in peace with the loving person". The recording was difficult because of conflicts with producer Philippe Delettrez and lack of time and money, so that the band members deemed the song as unfinished.

== Critical reception ==
"L'Autre Finistère" helped to increase the sales of the parent album, Fous à lier, which achieved Platinum status; moreover, French radios much played the song and the band's concert tour was more successful in terms of audience figures. Retrospectively, in 2002, Elia Habib, an expert of French charts, considered the song as marked by a "musical maturity". In 2009, François Gorin of Télérama spoke of the song as "something stuck in [his] memory like an old chewing gum", and considered that "the beginning of the song, the verses, is Cabrel on the accordion and Les Négresses Vertes. But this refrain, as soon as it comes, everything is saved". In 2019, according to Rebecca Manzoni of France Inter, "L'Autre Finistère" appeared as "an anomaly or a miracle" when it was released in 1993, as the song has obsolete words or grammatical syntax, deals with the theme of courtly love, uses a 1960s-like vocal harmonies and outdated instruments like guiro and accordion; however, she added that the song testifies to "a concern for the beautiful work".

== Chart performance ==
In France, "L'Autre Finistère" debuted at number 22 on the chart edition of 27 February 1993, which was the highest debut that week; however, it dropped the two weeks later until reaching number 39, but climbed the following weeks and eventually peaked at number ten for a sole week in its 11th week. It remained for 17 weeks in the top 50, nine of them in the top 20. On the European Hot 100, it started at number 100 on 3 April 1993, reached a peak of number 54 in its eighth week and fell off the chart after ten weeks of presence.

== Track listings ==
- CD single
1. "L'Autre Finistère" — 4:05
2. "En tapant du poing" — 5:09
- CD maxi
1. "L'Autre Finistère" — 4:05
2. "En tapant du poing" — 5:09
3. "Le monde dort" (démo) — 3:46
- 7" single
1. "L'Autre Finistère" — 4:05
2. "En tapant du poing" — 5:09
- Cassette
1. "L'Autre Finistère" — 4:05
2. "En tapant du poing" — 5:09

== Personnel ==
- Mixing — Dominique Blanc-Francard
- Producer — Philippe Delettrez
- Recording — Dominique Ledudal

== Charts ==
Chart (1993)	Peak position
Europe (Eurochart Hot 100)	54
France (Airplay Chart [AM Stations])	15
France (SNEP)	10

== Release history ==
Country	Date	Format	Label
France	1993	CD single	Virgin
France	1993	CD maxi	Virgin
France	1993	7" single	Virgin
France	1993	Cassette	Virgin
