= Les Innocents =

French rock band

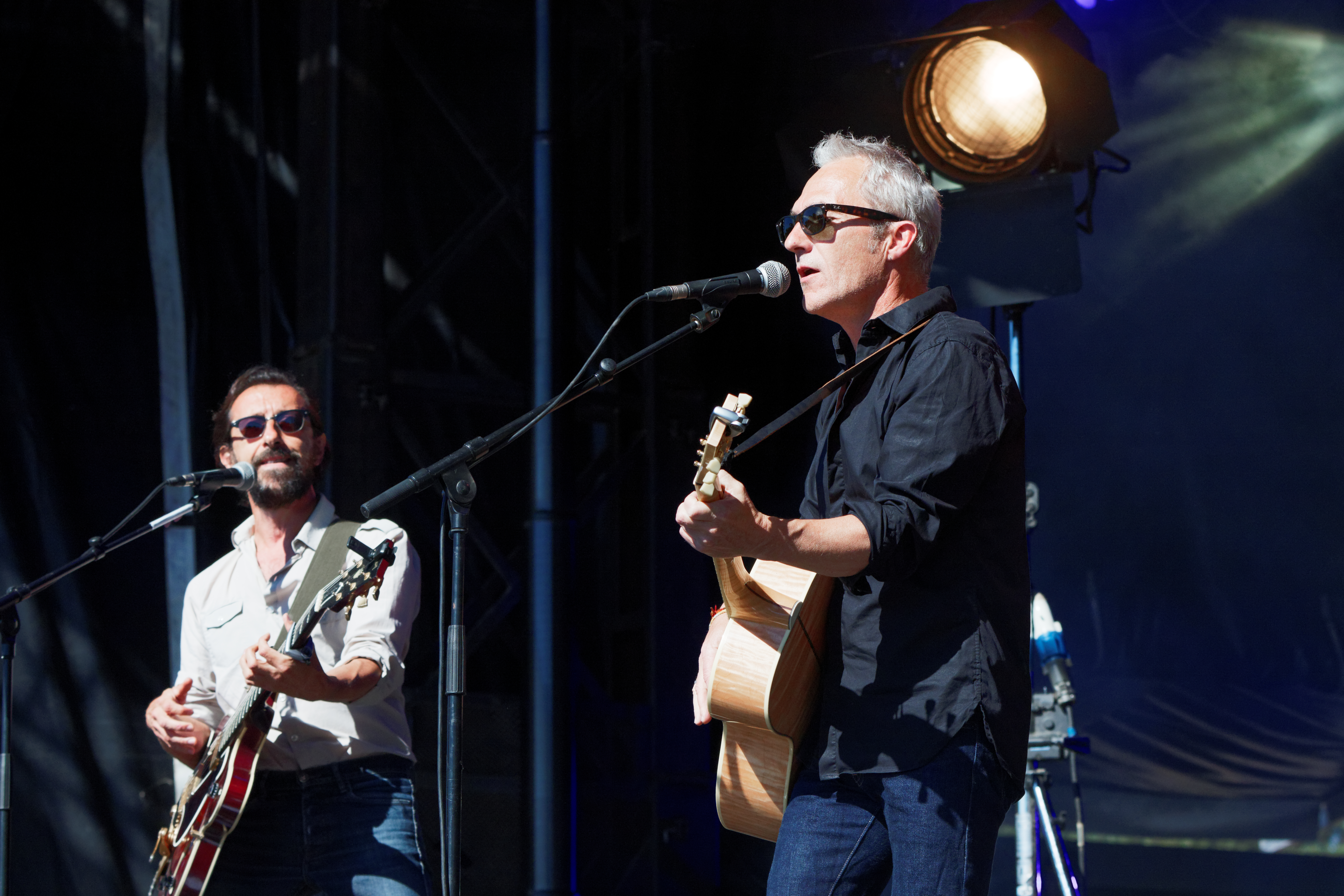
- Les Innocents in 2016

Background information
- Origin: Lille, France
- Genres: Rock, pop
- Years active: 1982–1999; 2013–present
- Label: Virgin
- Members: Jean-Philippe Nataf; Jean-Christophe Urbain
- Past members: Michael Rushton; Bernard Viguié; Christopher Board; Pierre Morin
- Website: www.lesinnocents.fr

Les Innocents is a French rock and pop duo consisting of Jean-Philippe Nataf (nicknamed Jipé, vocals, guitar) and Jean-Christophe Urbain (nicknamed Jean-Chri, vocals, guitar, keyboards) from 1982 to 1999 and 2013 onwards. Former members include Michael Rushton (drums), Bernard Viguie (bass), Rico (bass) and Pierre Morin (drums).

== Biography ==
The band was founded in 1982 in Lille and had their initial success with the single "Jodie" (1987), and their first album Cent Mètres au Paradis (1989). In 1992, they produced their album Fous à lier, which became their first major success. "L'Autre Finistère", the main single of the album, was extensively played by French radios in 1992. The next album, Post Partum, confirmed their talent and popularity, and took them to the peak of their fame. "Colore" was one of the most aired singles of 1996.

They released a self-titled album in 1999, which ultimately led to their separation in 2000, in part because of mediocre sales, as well as some internal musical differences. JP Nataf continued a solo career, while Jean-Christophe Urbain focused on producing and writing for other artists. The pair eventually met again in 2003 for the release of their best of named "Meilleurs Souvenirs".

Jean-Philippe Nataf and Jean-Christophe Urbain are close friends of the singer Jil Caplan, with whom they have worked. Jean-Christophe Urbain eventually became her life partner.

The duo reformed in 2013 and have been performing at small concerts on a regular basis since then. They eventually recorded a new album, named "Mandarine", released in 2015.

== Members ==
- from 1982 to June 1988: JP Nataf (Jipé), Rico, Bertrand Sansonetti (Tramber), Pierre Morin
- from June 1988 to 1990: JP Nataf (Jipé), Rico, Jean-Christophe Urbain (Jean-Chri)
- from 1990 to 1995: JP Nataf (Jipé), Rico, Jean-Christophe Urbain (Jean-Chri), Michael Rushton
- from 1996 to 1999: JP Nataf (Jipé), Jean-Christophe Urbain (Jean-Chri), Michael Rushton, Bernard Viguié, Christopher Board.
- after 2013: JP Nataf (Jipé), Jean-Christophe Urbain (Jean-Chri).
- Bertrand Sansonetti has released one album in 1991, Saint-Lazare, which features Le carrousel.
- Pierre Morin has released two albums: La Fidélité mon amour in 1991 and Free Vol in 1995.

== Discography ==
=== Studio albums ===
- Cent Mètres Au Paradis (1989)
- Fous à lier (1992)
- Post-Partum (1995)
- Les Innocents (1999)
- Mandarine (2015)
- 6 1/2 (2019)

=== Compilation ===
- Meilleurs Souvenirs (2003)

=== Singles and EPs ===
With peak positions in French SNEP Singles Chart:

- "Pamela" (1985)
- "Jodie" (1987) - #34
- "Et le Temps n'attend pas" (1988)
- "Les Innocents chantent Noël" (1989)
- "Miss Monde pleure" (1990)
- "Mon Dernier Soldat" (1991)
- "L'Autre Finistère" (1992) - #10
- "Un Homme extraordinaire" (1993) - #27
- "Fous à lier" (1993)
- "Je vais à Bang Bang" (1993)
- "Un Monde parfait" (1995)
- "Colore" (1996) - #31
- "Des jours adverses" (1996)
- "Dentelle" (1996)
- "Raide raide raide" (1997)
- "Le Cygne" (1999)
- "Danny Wilde" (2000)
- "Une Vie moins ordinaire" (2000)
- "Un Homme extraordinaire" (2013) - #125
- "Les philharmonies martiennes" (2015)
- "Love qui peut" (2015)
