= Steve Jolliffe =

English musician (born 1949)

Steve Jolliffe (born 28 April 1949) is an English musician.

After meeting Rick Davies (Supertramp) in the late 1960s Jolliffe played with him in a band called the Joint. He left the Joint to study music at the Berlin Konservatorium. There he met Edgar Froese and played with one of the earliest incarnations of Tangerine Dream. He subsequently joined the band Steamhammer, a blues-rock outfit that experienced moderate success in the early 1970s, touring extensively and played on their Mk II album, as well as co-writing "Autumn Song", which topped the French charts. After leaving the band, Jolliffe composed the music for John Samson's 1973 documentary Tattoo.

Jolliffe rejoined Tangerine Dream in the late 1970s, recording the album Cyclone with the band in 1978. A European tour followed the release of Cyclone. On return to the UK after touring, Jolliffe released a solo album titled Earth in 1978, following this with the release of solo albums at the rate of approximately one per year, including The Bruton Suite, Journeys Out of the Body, Alien and Zanzi. To date Jolliffe has released more than 40 solo albums and performed with artists including Eat Static.

Jolliffe is a multi-instrumentalist, playing, among others, the keyboard, flute and piccolo.
