= Steve Davy =

British bass guitarist and vocalist

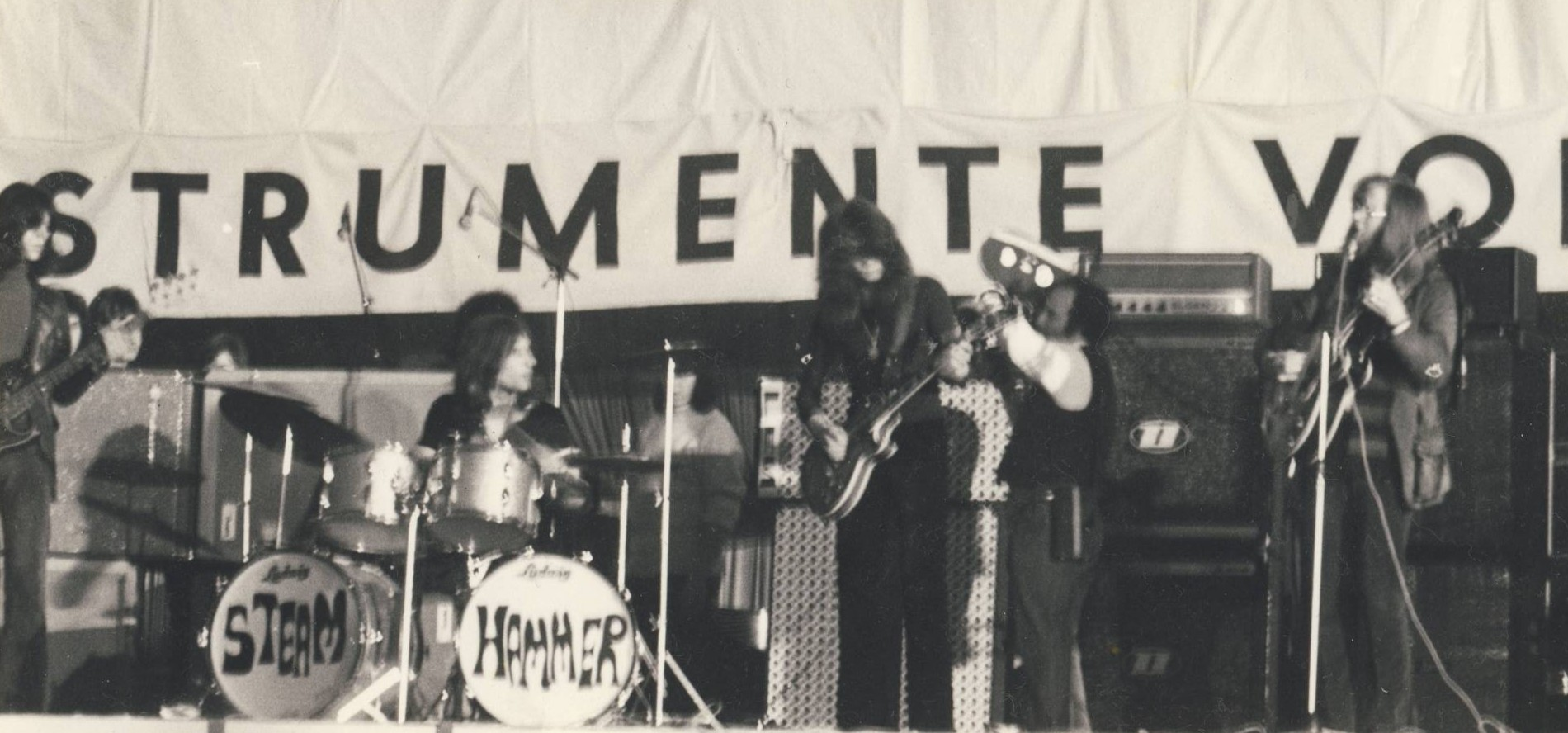
- Steamhammer in concert, Hamburg, West Germany, Easter 1970. Steve Davy is on the far left.

Background information
- Born: United Kingdom
- Genres: Blues rock
- Instrument: Bass guitar
- Years active: 1968–1970

Steve Davy is a British bass guitarist and vocalist, known for being a member of the blues-rock band Steamhammer. He played on the first three Steamhammer albums. Subsequently, he left the band and was replaced by Louis Cennamo.

On the Steamhammer (also known as Reflection) and Mk II albums of 1969, Davy played bass guitar and sang backing vocals. On the 1970 Mountains album he also played organ.

In 2005 and 2008 he was credited with photography for the Language and Dooji Wooji albums by Lorraine Feather.
