= Mick Bradley =

British musician

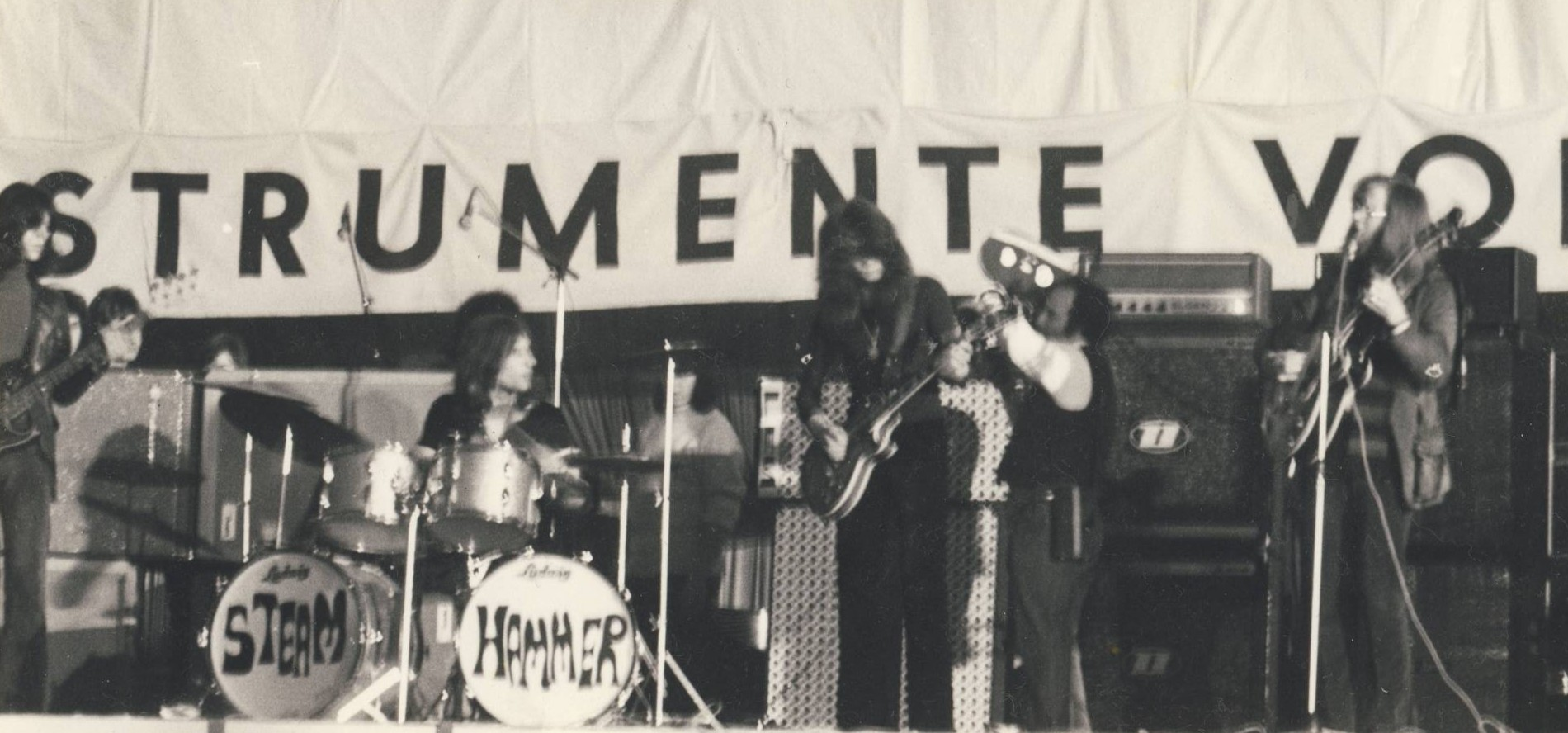
- Steamhammer in concert, Hamburg, West Germany, Easter 1970. Mick Bradley is on the centre left.

Background information
- Born: 1947; United Kingdom
- Died: 8 February 1972 (aged 24–25)
- Genres: Blues rock
- Instrument: Drums
- Years active: 1969–1972
- Formerly of: Steamhammer; Methuselah

Mick Bradley (1947 – 8 February 1972) was a British drummer and vocalist, known for being a member of the blues-rock band Steamhammer. He played on three Steamhammer albums.

In 1969, Bradley played drums on the Methuselah album by the late 1960s band Methuselah. He then joined Steamhammer, taking over from Michael Rushton, and played drums on the Mk II (1969), Mountains (1970), and Speech (1972) albums. He also played percussion and conga.

Bradley died on 8 February 1972, aged 25. He died from undiagnosed leukemia shortly before the mixing of the Speech album was completed. The album is dedicated to him on the inside album cover and the band dissolved the following year, making Speech the final Steamhammer album. A memorial concert took place at the Marquee Club in London on 14 March 1972, with appearances by the bands Atomic Rooster, Beggars Opera, If, and Gringo.
