= Micky Waller =

English drummer (1941–2008)

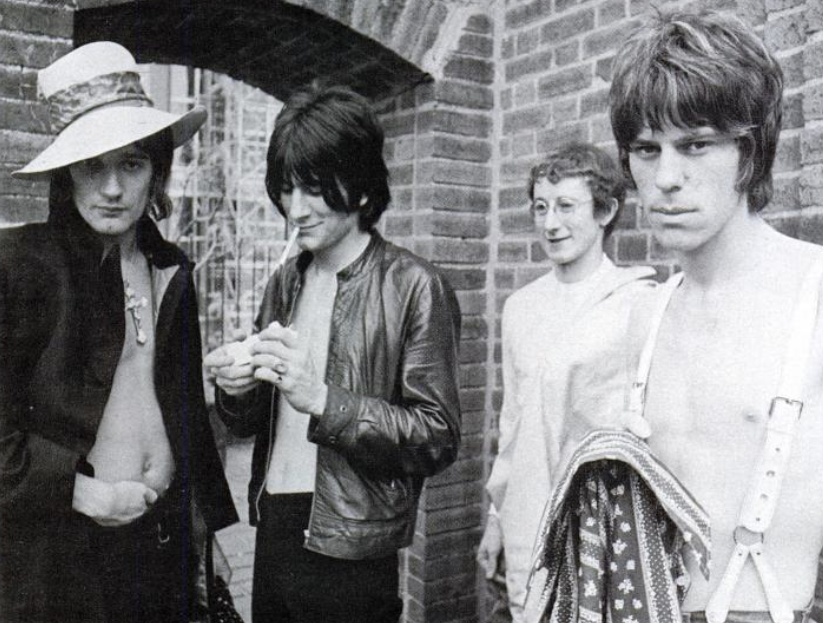
- Micky Waller (second from right) as part of The Jeff Beck Group in 1968 (photo by Don Hunstein)

Background information
- Born: Michael Waller; 6 September 1941; Hammersmith, London, England
- Died: 29 April 2008 (aged 66) London, England
- Instrument: Drums
- Years active: 1960–2008

Michael Waller (6 September 1941 – 29 April 2008) was an English drummer, who played with many of the biggest names on the UK rock and blues scene, after he became a professional musician in 1960. In addition to being a member, albeit sometimes briefly, of some of the seminal bands of the 1960s, Waller played as a session musician with a host of UK and US artists.

== Biography ==
Waller was born in Hammersmith, London. Waller's first professional band, The Flee-Rekkers, had a No. 23 hit in the UK Singles Chart in 1960, with their recording of "Green Jeans" produced by Joe Meek. He soon left to join a well-known band of the day, Joe Brown and the Bruvvers.

In July 1963, he joined the Cyril Davies R&B All Stars, a band with a volatile line-up, replacing the band's original drummer Carlo Little. At that time the line-up was:

- Cyril Davies (vocals, harmonica)
- Long John Baldry (vocals)
- Geoff Bradford (guitar)
- Cliff Barton (bass)
- Keith Scott (piano)
- Micky Waller (drums)

Davies died on 7 January 1964, and Waller left as the band was changed by Long John Baldry to become the Hoochie Coochie Men. Waller went on to play with Marty Wilde as one of the Wildecats. While with Wilde, Waller played on two tours with Little Richard around the UK.

Like many musicians of the day, Waller moved frequently from band to band, or as was often the case, the band he was in metamorphosed into another. After a short stint with Georgie Fame and the Blue Flames, a band he was to rejoin several times, he joined Brian Auger to become part of The Trinity, and was soon followed by Long John Baldry. In April 1965, the group was expanded by Rod Stewart and Julie Driscoll, and evolved into a new band, Steampacket, featuring:

- Long John Baldry (vocals)
- Rod Stewart (vocals)
- Julie Driscoll (vocals)
- Vic Briggs (guitar)
- Brian Auger (keyboards)
- Rick Brown (bass)
- Micky Waller (drums)

In April 1966, Rod Stewart left, followed by Long John Baldry. The remaining members formed the nucleus of a new band, Brian Auger, Julie Driscoll & The Trinity:

- Julie Driscoll (vocals)
- Vic Briggs (guitar)
- Rick Brown (bass)
- Brian Auger (keyboards)
- Micky Waller (drums)

Waller subsequently joined John Mayall's Bluesbreakers for a few gigs in April 1967, while Mayall looked for a permanent drummer, and was soon replaced by Keef Hartley.

- John Mayall (vocals, guitar, keyboards)
- Peter Green (guitar, vocals)
- John McVie (bass)
- Micky Waller (drums)

In August 1967, Waller joined the Jeff Beck Group, with former bandmate Rod Stewart:

- Rod Stewart (vocals)
- Jeff Beck (guitar)
- Ron Wood (bass)
- Micky Waller (drums)

The group produced two albums. Truth in 1968 saw the four piece play a mixture of blues with guitar riffs. The instrumental, "Beck's Bolero", with Jimmy Page on rhythm guitar, The Who's Keith Moon on drums, and bassist John Paul Jones; combined with Waller's playing on the remake of The Yardbirds' hit "Shapes of Things"; set the template for a heavier blues style. The following year, a second album from the band was Beck-Ola. But by this point Waller had already departed the band, to be replaced by Tony Newman. The mercurial Beck had decided he wanted a "heavier" drummer, and on 11 February 1969 manager Peter Grant fired Waller and Wood - although Wood was retained per Beck's wishes.

In 1969, Waller flew to Venice Beach Los Angeles to form the band "Silver Metre" with guitarist Leigh Stephens of Blue Cheer fame, fellow Brit Pete Sears on bass and keyboards, and Jack Reynolds (singer). They recorded one album at Trident Studios in London, England (one track, "Gang Bang", containing an extended drum solo) which was released on the National General label, produced by their manager, FM rock radio pioneer Tom Donahue.

The same year, Waller sat in on An Old Raincoat Won't Ever Let You Down, Rod Stewart's first solo album (known as The Rod Stewart Album in the US). The backing band on the album also included Ron Wood, Ian McLagan, Keith Emerson, and guitarists Martin Pugh (of Steamhammer, and later Armageddon and 7th Order) and Martin Quittenton (also from Steamhammer). Waller's relationship with Stewart and Wood served him well, as he would go on to join them on the next three Stewart solo albums, Gasoline Alley, Every Picture Tells a Story and Never A Dull Moment The coupling meant that Waller played percussion on Stewart's transatlantic chart topping hit single, "Maggie May". Waller also shared drum duties on Stewart's Smiler album - the opening song of which contained Waller's dog making noises.

In 1971, Waller joined the Long John Baldry blues band for Baldry's first tour of the United States. The band included Ian Armitt on piano, and fellow Stewart session men, Sam Mitchell on guitar, and Pete Sears on bass. Waller continued to work regularly in both rock and blues bands, and joined the original line-up of the Deluxe Blues Band, with Dick Heckstall-Smith, and bassist Bob Brunning.

- Danny Adler (vocal, guitar)
- Bob Brunning (bass)
- Bob Hall (piano)
- Dick Heckstall-Smith (sax)
- Micky Waller (drums)

Deluxe Blues Band, 1988

In the early 1980s, Waller was a member of the Terry Smith Blues Band, with Jo Ann Kelly (vocals) and Tony Ashton (organ). Over the intervening years Waller's playing experience included credits with The Walker Brothers, Cat Stevens, Eric Clapton, Bo Diddley, Dusty Springfield, Paul McCartney and Billy Bragg. In the early 1980s, Waller also played in the Sam Mitchell Band.

Brunning subsequently hung onto the Deluxe Blues band name, reusing it for a number of line-ups, whilst Waller went to play in Italy for a period. Upon his return to London, Waller briefly joined a revived Deluxe Blues Band that reunited him with Heckstall-Smith and Brunning, along with new members Dave Beaumont, Alan Vincent and Phil Taylor. He continued to play intermittently with a number of blues bands in the London area, including the eponymous Micky Waller Band. In his later years, he took a degree in law, and used his gained knowledge to win court claims for unpaid royalties.

Waller died of liver failure in London on 29 April 2008, aged 66.
