= Farewell (Rod Stewart song) =

Single by Rod Stewart

from the album Smiler
- B-side: "Bring It On Home to Me/You Send Me"
- Released: 27 September 1974
- Genre: Folk rock
- Length: 4:34
- Label: Mercury
- Songwriter(s): Martin Quittenton, Rod Stewart

Rod Stewart singles chronology
"Oh! No Not My Baby" (1973)	"Farewell" (1974)	"Mine for Me" (1974)

"Farewell" is a song written by Martin Quittenton and Rod Stewart. Stewart released it on his 1974 album Smiler. Among the musicians featured were Ray Jackson of Lindisfarne on mandolin, and Ric Grech on violin.

When released as a single in the United Kingdom in September 1974, the song became a Top 10 hit (No. 7) as part of a double A-side with his medley "Bring It On Home to Me/You Send Me". In the United States, this song was released as a single but its flip side, "Mine For Me," was the track that charted.

Billboard praised the story told by the lyrics, which it described as being "about a young man leaving home to make it in the world of show business."
