= Methuselah (band) =

English rock band founded and active in the 1960s

- Origin: England
- Genres: Folk rock, gospel rock
- Years active: 1960s
- Labels: Elektra Records
- Past members: Craig Austin, Mick Bradley, John Gladwin, Les Nicol, Terry Wincott

Methuselah was an English rock band, founded and active in the 1960s.

== Overview ==
The line-up included Mick Bradley (drums), who came from The Sorrows and left to join Steamhammer in 1969. John Gladwin and Terry Wincott were school friends from Scunthorpe.

The origins of the band were in two earlier 1960s bands, The Dimples and Gospel Garden. The group renamed itself to Methuselah. Influences included folk music and gospel music. The band were signed to Elektra Records in the late 1960s, with a three-LP contract. John Gladwin and Terry Wincott were later in the folkband Amazing Blondel.

== Members ==
The quintet consisted of:

- Craig Austin – bass, vocals
- Mick Bradley – drums (died 1972)
- John Gladwin – vocals, vibes
- Les Nicol – guitar, vocals
- Terry Wincott – guitar, vocals

== Discography ==
Albums

- Methuselah (1969)
- Matthew Mark Luke & John (1969, unreleased)
