= Steamhammer (band) =

English rock band

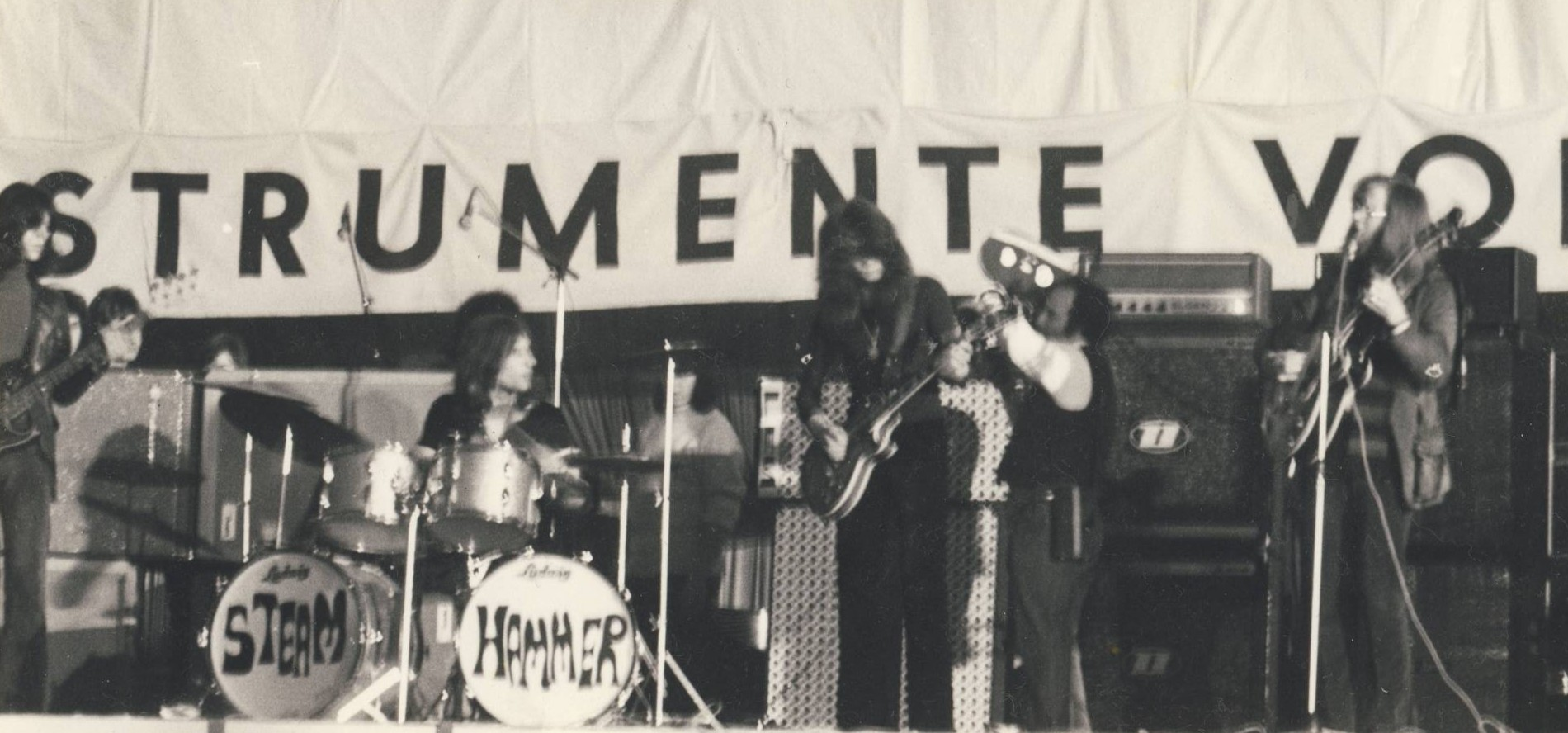
- Steamhammer in concert, Hamburg, West Germany, Easter 1970

Background information
- Origin: England
- Genres: Blues rock; progressive rock
- Years active: 1968–1973, 2020–present
- Members: Martin Pugh; Pete Sears; John Lingwood; Phil Colombatto
- Past members: Steve Davy; Kieran White; Martin Quittenton; Michael Rushton; Mick Bradley; Steve Jolliffe; Louis Cennamo; Ian Ellis; Bruce Michael Paine; Micky Waller
- Website: Steamhammer.com

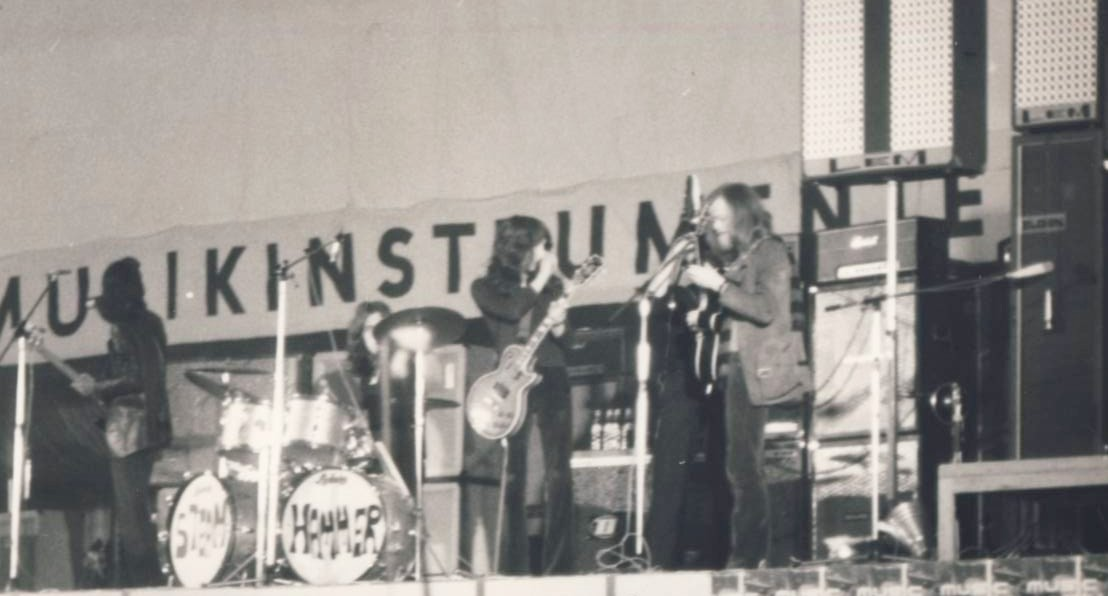
Steamhammer in 1970

Steamhammer are an English rock band from Worthing, England, formed in 1968 by vocalist Kieran White, guitarists Martin Quittenton and Martin Pugh, bassist Steve Davy, and drummer Michael Rushton.

== Career ==
Steamhammer's first line-up acted as backing band for Freddie King on two of his tours of England in 1968–1969. Like many of their peers, the band experimented with instrumental passages, introspective lyrics, and ultrasonic guitar effects, along with folk, jazz and classical influences. After playing in English pubs in the late 1960s, Steamhammer's self-titled album Steamhammer (aka Reflection) debuted on Columbia Records in 1968, featuring their single, "Junior's Wailing", and including covers of "You'll Never Know" by B. B. King and "Twenty Four Hours" by Eddie Boyd as well as original songs by White, Quittenton, and Pugh. Guest session musicians Harold McNair (flute) and Pete Sears (piano) also played on the album. While the album was not commercially successful, the band's sound became popular live, especially in West Germany.

In the summer of 1969, Quittenton and Rushton left the band, and Steve Jolliffe (saxophone, flute) and Mick Bradley (drums) joined. This line-up recorded the album Mk II, released in 1969. It consisted entirely of original songs, and the musical style had more jazz and progressive rock influences. Jolliffe left the band in 1970. The remaining band members recorded the album Mountains, which was released in 1970. This album included a cover of "Riding on the L & N" by Lionel Hampton and seven original songs.

In 1971, Davy left the band, and Louis Cennamo (formerly of the original line-up of Renaissance) was recruited as his replacement. After a European tour in the summer of 1971, White left the band, and the remaining trio of Pugh, Bradley and Cennamo began recording a new album. This line-up, along with guest vocalist Garth Watt-Roy (of Fuzzy Duck), recorded the album Speech, which was released in 1972. It consisted of three long, mostly instrumental songs, in a heavier progressive-rock vein than the basic blues and jazz/folk influences of their previous albums.

Bradley died of undiagnosed leukemia on 8 February 1972, aged 25. A memorial concert took place at London's Marquee Club on 14 March that year, with appearances by fellow bands Atomic Rooster, Beggars Opera, If, and Gringo. Steamhammer carried on for a while with a new drummer, John Lingwood, and lead singer, Ian Ellis (ex-Clouds). The new line-up debuted at London's Imperial College on 3 May, followed by a European tour in May and UK tour in June with American vocalist/guitarist Bruce Michael Paine replacing Ellis. In June 1973, Paine left and Martin Quittenton rejoined. This new line-up changed their name to Axis, playing their first gig under that name at the Marquee on 15 June, but the band split towards the end of 1973.

== Post breakup ==
In 1974, two years after drummer Bradley's death, Keith Relf, who had helped produce Speech, sought Cennamo and Pugh out to form a band in California. Armageddon emerged in late 1974, and Rolling Stone magazine ran two articles on them before they had a drummer, a contract, or even a name for themselves. Relf brought in Bobby Caldwell on drums, and introduced the band to A&M Records producer Jerry Moss. Half a song into a set at the Charlie Chaplin Sound Stage in Hollywood, Moss signed Armageddon – they then released a self-titled effort in 1975. The band never toured, although the record was doing fairly well. Relf (and Cennamo) had returned to England while the rest of the band was still in LA, and had been considering a new band with other former Renaissance members – but died after being shocked by his own guitar in May 1976. Pugh and Caldwell tried to reassemble Armageddon in the early 1980s, producing a number of songs for a second LP for Capitol Records with singer Jeff Fenholt (of Jesus Christ Superstar), and were close to signing contract – but the project never got past the demo/rehearsal stage. Caldwell eventually returned to Captain Beyond, Cennamo later rejoined the original Renaissance line-up (then known as Illusion) and later worked with Jim McCarty in Stairway. Pugh left the music business but stayed in California, eventually emerging from retirement to sit in with US-based rock and roll band 7th Order in 2002–2003.

After leaving Steamhammer, White recorded a solo album, Open Door, which was released in 1975 – he later emigrated to the US (specifically Oregon), where he worked as a truck driver until dying in 1995 (cancer). Quittenton played guitar and co-wrote songs, including "Maggie May" and "You Wear It Well" on albums by Rod Stewart. Jolliffe joined Tangerine Dream in 1978, and played on the album Cyclone.

== Reformation ==
In 2020, Pugh, along with Pete Sears and John Lingwood, plus vocalist/guitarist Phil Colombatto, reformed Steamhammer, and released the band's fifth album, Wailing Again, in early 2022.

== Members ==
- Martin Pugh – lead guitar (1968–1973, 2020–present)
- Steve Davy – bass (1968–1971), backing vocals, keyboards (1970–1971)
- Kieran White – lead vocals, harmonica (1968–1971; died 1995), rhythm guitar (1969–1971)
- Martin Quittenton – guitar (1968–1969, 1973; died 2015)
- Michael Rushton – drums (1968–1969)
- Mick Bradley – drums (1969–1972; died 1972)
- Steve Jolliffe – saxophone, flute, backing vocals, keyboards (1969–1970)
- Louis Cennamo – bass (1971–1973)
- John Lingwood – drums (1972–1973, 2020–present)
- Ian Ellis – lead vocals, guitar (1972)
- Bruce Michael Paine – lead vocals, guitar (1972–1973)
- Pete Sears — bass, backing vocals, keyboards (2020–present)
- Phil Colombatto — lead vocals, guitar, harmonica (2020–present)
Timeline

== Discography ==
=== Singles ===
- "Junior's Wailing" (single version)/ "Windmill" (1969)
- "Autumn Song" / "Blues For Passing People" (1969)
- "Mountains" / "I Wouldn't Have Thought" (1971)

=== Albums ===
- Steamhammer (June 1969)
- Mk II (February 1970)
- Mountains (December 1970)
- Speech (1972)
- Wailing Again (2022)

=== Compilations ===
- This is ... Steamhammer (1974) – 2×LP
- Riding on the L&N – The Anthology (2012) – 2×CD
