= Steamhammer (album) =

Studio album by Steamhammer
- Released: June 1969
- Recorded: Pan Sound Studios, London, England
- Genres: Heavy metal; blues
- Label: Bellaphon / CBS
- Producer: Michael Vestey

Steamhammer chronology
Steamhammer (1969)	Mk II (1970)

Professional ratings
Review scores
Source	Rating
Allmusic	4/5 stars

Steamhammer is the debut album by the British rock band Steamhammer, issued in March 1969. Steamhammer was American blues guitarist Freddy King's backing band whenever he toured England. The musicians in the band were Martin Quittenton (guitar), Kieran White (vocals, guitar, harmonica), Martin Pugh (guitar), Steve Davy (bass), and Michael Rushton (drums). The album includes classic blues numbers by B.B. King ("You'll Never Know") and Eddie Boyd ("Twenty-four Hours"), as well as compositions by band members White, Quittenton, and Pugh. The session musicians Harold McNair (flute) and Pete Sears (piano) also appear on the album.

The song "Junior's Wailing" was recorded by Status Quo on their album Ma Kelly's Greasy Spoon in 1970.

== Track listing ==
Side 1

1. "Water (Part One)" — (Martin Quittenton, Martin Pugh) 0:52
2. "Junior's Wailing" — (Kieran White, Martin Pugh) 3:18
3. "Lost You Too" — (Martin Quittenton, Kieran White) 3:28
4. "She is the Fire" — (Martin Quittenton, Kieran White) 3:10
5. "You'll Never Know" — (B.B. King) 3:27
6. "Even the Clock" — (Martin Quittenton, Kieran White, Berkeley Graham) 3:49

Side 2

1. "Down the Highway" — (Martin Quittenton, Kieran White) 4:28
2. "On Your Road" — (Kieran White) 2:43
3. "Twenty-Four Hours" — (Eddie Boyd) 7:28
4. "When All Your Friends are Gone" — (Martin Quittenton, Kieran White) 3:49
5. "Water (Part Two)" — (Martin Quittenton, Martin Pugh) 1:44

== Release history ==
Steamhammer was released in 1969 (CBS 63611). "Junior's Wailing" was issued as a single.

== Personnel ==
Band members

- Kieran White – vocals, harmonica
- Martin Pugh – lead guitar
- Martin Quittenton – rhythm guitar
- Steve Davy – bass guitar
- Michael Rushton – drums

Session musicians

- Harold McNair – flute
- Pete Sears – piano

Others

- Producer: Michael Vestey
- Executive Producer: Andrew Cameron Miller
- Recording Engineers: Michael Cooper and Henry Aubrey-Fletcher
- Co-ordination: Barry Taylor
- Photographs: Clive Barda
- Design: Bob Priest
- Clothes: Take Six
- Recorded in Pan Sound Studios (London) Ltd
- Devised and Produced by Artists Musical Productions Limited, 46 Curzon Street, London
- Published by Franklyn Boyd Music (except Twenty-four Hours)
