= Fuzzy Duck (album) =

Studio album by Fuzzy Duck
- Released: 1971
- Recorded: Olympic Studios, London
- Genres: Progressive rock, hard rock
- Length: 40:51
- Label: MAM
- Producer: Fuzzy Duck

Professional ratings
Review scores
Source	Rating
Allmusic	link

Fuzzy Duck is the self-titled album by London-based progressive rock band Fuzzy Duck. When it was originally released, only 500 pressings were made, making the original vinyl LP extremely rare.

The song "Time Will Be Your Doctor" was written by Paul Francis along with two of his Tucky Buzzard bandmates, Nicky Graham and David Leonard Brown. Tucky Buzzard recorded their own version of the song for their self-titled album.

== Track listing ==
No.	Title	Writer(s)	Lead vocals	Length
1.	"Time Will Be Your Doctor"	Paul Francis, Nicky Graham, David Leonard Brown	White	5:09
2.	"Mrs. Prout"	Paul Francis, Roy Sharland	White	6:47
3.	"Just Look Around You"	Mick Hawksworth	Hawksworth	4:20
4.	"Afternoon Out"	Paul Francis, Roy Sharland	White	4:57
5.	"More Than I Am"	Mick Hawksworth	Hawksworth	5:30
6.	"Country Boy"	Paul Francis, Roy Sharland, Grahame White	White	6:00
7.	"In Our Time"	Mick Hawksworth	Hawksworth	6:39
8.	"A Word From Big D"	Grahame White, Mick Hawksworth	Sharland	1:39

Bonus tracks on CD release
No.	Title	Writer(s)	Lead vocals	Length
9.	"Double Time Woman"	Garth Watt-Roy	Watt-Roy	2:58
10.	"Big Brass Band"	Timothy Martin, Walt Meskell	Watt-Roy	2:56
11.	"One More Hour"	Garth Watt-Roy, Paul Francis, Hawksworth, Sharland	Watt-Roy	3:58
12.	"No Name Face"	Garth Watt-Roy, Paul Francis, Hawksworth, Sharland	Watt-Roy	3:05

- "Double Time Woman" released as a single in August 1971 (b/w "Just Look Around You")
- "Big Brass Band"/"One More Hour" released as a single in November 1971
- "No Name Face" previously unreleased

== Personnel ==
Fuzzy Duck

- Mick "Doc" Hawksworth – bass, vocals, 12-string acoustic guitar (7), electric cello (7)
- Roy "Daze" Sharland – organ, "ducking" vocals (8), electric piano (3)
- Paul Francis – drums, percussion
- Grahame White – electric (1–8) and acoustic (2) guitars, vocals (1–8)
- Garth Watt-Roy – electric guitar (9–12), vocals (9–12)

Technical

- Keith Harwood – engineer
- Jonathan Xavier Coudrille – artwork
- David Reed – photography
