= Mine for Me =

Single by Rod Stewart

from the album Smiler
- B-side: "Farewell"
- Released: 4 November 1974
- Length: 4:34
- Label: Mercury
- Songwriter(s): Paul McCartney, Linda McCartney

Rod Stewart singles chronology
"Farewell" (1974)	"Mine for Me" (1974)	"Sailing" (1975)

"Mine for Me" is a song written by Paul and Linda McCartney. It was recorded by Rod Stewart as a track for his 1974 album Smiler. When released as a single that year, the track became a minor hit in the United States, reaching number 91 on the Billboard Hot 100.

Cash Box said that "the song is a sensitive tune and Rod’s interpretation is excellent" and that "the instrumentation is mellow and Rod’s vocal textures do much to bring life to this vibrant tune." Record World said that the song "breezes along with tropical climes suggested by steel drums."
