= Smiler (album) =

Studio album by Rod Stewart
- Released: 27 September 1974
- Recorded: November 1973-May 1974
- Studios: Morgan Studios, London and The Wick, Richmond
- Genres: Rock; British folk rock
- Length: 42:24
- Label: Mercury
- Producer: Rod Stewart

Rod Stewart chronology
Sing It Again Rod (1973)	Smiler (1974)	Atlantic Crossing (1975)

Singles from Smiler
- 1. "Farewell" Released: 27 September 1974 (UK); 2. "Mine for Me" Released: November 1974 (US)

Smiler is the fifth solo album by English rock singer-songwriter Rod Stewart. It was released on 27 September 1974 by Mercury Records. It reached number 1 in the UK album chart, and number 13 in the US.

The album includes the UK top ten single "Farewell", co-written by Stewart and long time collaborator Martin Quittenton. While the single was also released in the US, it was its B-side "Mine for Me", a song written for Stewart by Paul and Linda McCartney that became a minor hit there, reaching number 91 on the Billboard Hot 100.

The album also includes covers of Chuck Berry, Sam Cooke and Bob Dylan songs, as well as a duet with Elton John of John's song "Let Me Be Your Car". Stewart also covered Carole King's "(You Make Me Feel Like) A Natural Woman" where 'Woman' is switched to 'Man'. The release of the album was held up for five months due to legal problems between Mercury Records and Warner Bros. Records.

Musicians appearing on the album included members of Stewart's band Faces, as well as frequent collaborators Martin Quittenton (guitars), Pete Sears (bass & keyboards), and Mickey Waller (drums).

== Reception ==
Professional ratings
Review scores
Source	Rating
AllMusic	2/5 stars
Christgau's Record Guide	B−
Rolling Stone	(mixed)
Džuboks	(mixed)

== Track listing ==
1. "Sweet Little Rock 'n' Roller" (Chuck Berry) – 3:43
2. "Lochinvar" (Pete Sears) – 0:25
3. "Farewell" (Rod Stewart, Martin Quittenton) – 4:34
4. "Sailor" – (Stewart, Ronnie Wood) 3:35
5. "Bring It On Home to Me/You Send Me" (Sam Cooke) – 3:57
6. "Let Me Be Your Car" (Elton John, Bernie Taupin) – 4:56
7. "(You Make Me Feel Like) A Natural Man" (Gerry Goffin, Carole King, Jerry Wexler) – 3:54
8. "Dixie Toot" – (Stewart, Ronnie Wood) 3:27
9. "Hard Road" (Harry Vanda, George Young) – 4:27
10. "I've Grown Accustomed to Her Face" Instrumental (Alan Jay Lerner, Frederick Loewe) – 1:32
11. "Girl from the North Country" (Bob Dylan) – 3:52
12. "Mine for Me" (Paul McCartney, Linda McCartney) – 4:02

A 1991 CD compilation called 'back 2 back – 2 for 1' combined Smiler with Gasoline Alley. However, tracks 2, 9 and 10, were left out on this release.

== Personnel ==
- Rod Stewart – vocals
- Ronnie Wood – acoustic & electric guitar, bass guitar
- Martin Quittenton – acoustic guitar
- Spike Heatley, Willie Weeks – bass guitar
- Elton John – piano and vocals on "Let Me Be Your Car"
- Pete Sears – piano, harpsichord, celeste
- Ian McLagan – Hammond organ
- Ray Jackson – mandolin
- Ric Grech, Dick Powell – violin
- The Memphis Horns – horns
- Paul McCartney – backing vocals on "Mine for Me"
- Irene Chanter – backing vocals
- Doreen Chanter – backing vocals
- Ray Cooper – percussion
- Tropic Isles Steel Band – drums
- Micky Waller, Andy Newmark, Kenney Jones – drums
- Chris Barber's Jazz Band
- Mike Bobak – engineering
- Bob Ludwig – mastering

== Charts ==
Chart (1974–75)	Peak position
Australian Albums (Kent Music Report)	8
Canada Top Albums/CDs (RPM)	11
Finnish Albums (The Official Finnish Charts)	28
Japanese Albums (Oricon)	65
New Zealand Albums (RMNZ)	29
Norwegian Albums (VG-lista)	19
UK Albums (Official Charts)	1
US Billboard 200	13

== Certifications ==
Region	Certification	Certified units/sales
United Kingdom (BPI)	Gold	100,000^{^}
^{^} Shipments figures based on certification alone.
