= Methuselah =

Longest-lived Biblical figure

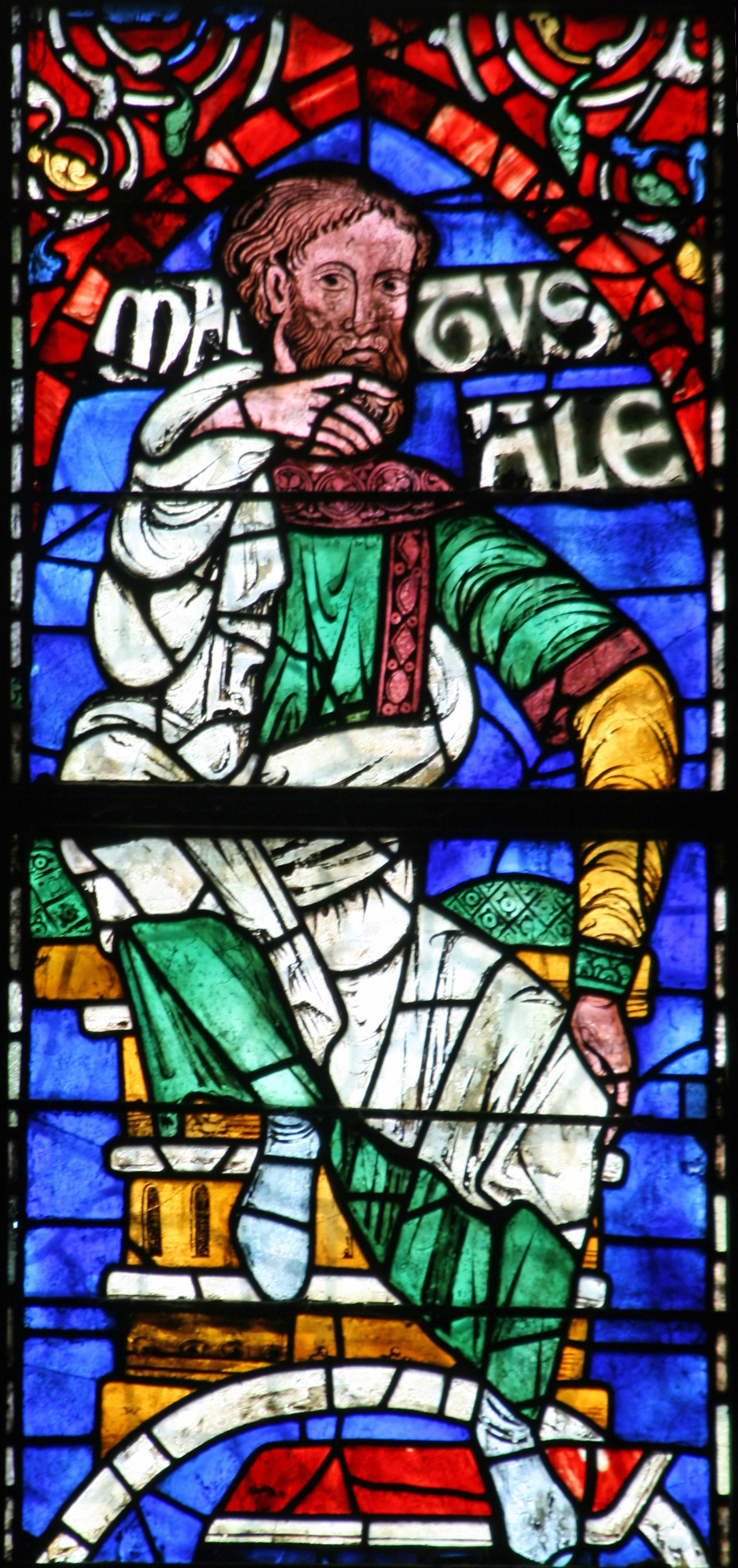
- Stained glass window of Methuselah from the southwest transept of Canterbury Cathedral in Kent, England
- Died: Died the year of the flood before it started, allegedly aged 969
- Known for: Exceptionally long life
- Children: Lamech and other sons and daughters
- Father: Enoch

Methuselah (US: /məˈθuzələ/; UK: /məˈθjuːzələ/; Hebrew: מְתוּשֶׁלַח, romanized: Məṯūšélaḥ, in pausa Hebrew: מְתוּשָׁלַח, romanized: Məṯūšālaḥ, 'his death shall send' or 'man of the javelin' or 'death of sword'; Greek: Μαθουσάλας Mathousalas) was a biblical patriarch and a figure in Judaism, Christianity, and Islam. He is claimed to have lived to 969 years of age, the longest lifespan claimed in the Bible. According to the Book of Genesis, Methuselah was the son of Enoch, the father of Lamech, and the grandfather of Noah. Elsewhere in the Bible, Methuselah is mentioned in genealogies in 1 Chronicles and the Gospel of Luke.

His life is described in further detail in other texts such as the Book of Enoch, Slavonic Enoch, and the Book of Moses. Bible commentators have offered various explanations as to why the Book of Genesis describes him as having died at such an advanced age: myth, mistranslation, or giving the impression that part of Genesis takes place in a very distant past. Methuselah's name has become synonymous with longevity, and he has been portrayed and referenced in film, television and music.

== In the Bible ==
Methuselah is a biblical patriarch mentioned in Genesis 5:21–27, as part of the genealogy linking Adam to Noah. The following is taken from the New Revised Standard Version of the Bible:

When Enoch had lived sixty-five years, he became the father of Methuselah. Enoch walked with God after the birth of Methuselah three hundred years, and had other sons and daughters. Thus all the days of Enoch were three hundred sixty-five years. Enoch walked with God; then he was no more, because God took him. When Methuselah had lived one hundred eighty-seven years, he became the father of Lamech. Methuselah lived after the birth of Lamech seven hundred eighty-two years, and had other sons and daughters. Thus all the days of Methuselah were nine hundred sixty-nine years; and he died. 5:21–27

According to the Hebrew Bible, Methuselah begets Lamech and then lives 782 more years. When Lamech is 182, he begets Noah, and the Genesis Flood comes when Noah is 600 years old. This would imply that Methuselah dies the year of the Flood. (In the Septuagint, most of the ages in this section are different. Lamech begets Noah at age 188, and Methuselah lives 802 years after begetting Lamech.) He was also the oldest of all the figures mentioned in the Bible. Methuselah is mentioned once in the Hebrew Bible outside of Genesis, in 1 Chronicles 1:3. Methuselah is mentioned a single time in the New Testament, when the Gospel of Luke traces Jesus' lineage back to Adam in Luke 3.

== In other religious texts ==
=== Judaism ===
The apocryphal Book of Enoch claims to be revelations of Enoch, transcribed by him and entrusted to be preserved for future generations by his son, Methuselah. In this book, Enoch recounts two visions he has had to Methuselah. The first is about the Flood, and the second chronicles the history of the world from Adam to the Last Judgment. In the latter vision, men are represented as animals – the righteous are white cattle and sheep, the sinners and enemies of Israel are black cattle and wild animals. Following his father's death in the Book of Enoch, Methuselah is designated by God as a priest, while Methuselah's grandson, Noah's brother Nir, is designated by God as his successor. In Slavonic Enoch, Methuselah asks his father for a blessing, and is given instructions on how to live righteously. After their father ascends into heaven, Methuselah and his brothers build an altar and make "a great festivity, praising God who had given such a sign by means of Enoch, who had found favor with Him."

The Book of Jubilees presents itself as "the history of the division of the days of the Law, of the events of the years, the year-weeks, and the jubilees of the world" and claims to be a revelation of God to Moses, given through the Angel of the Presence in addition to the written Law received by Moses on Mount Sinai; and, while the written Law was to be imparted to all, this was to be a secret tradition entrusted only to the saints of each generation, to Enoch, Methuselah, Noah, and Shem, then to Abraham, Isaac, Jacob, and Levi, and finally to the priests and scribes of the latter times.

Rabbinic literature states that when Noah was 480 years old, all the righteous men were dead—except Methuselah and himself. At God's command, they both announced that 120 years would be given to men for repentance; if, in that time, they had not mended their evil ways, the earth would be destroyed. But their plea was in vain; even while Noah was engaged in building the ark, the wicked—who were of immense stature as they were descended from the sons of God—made sport of him and his work, saying: "If the Flood should come, it could not harm us. We are too tall; and, moreover, we could close up with our feet [which were of monstrous size] the springs from below." They resorted to these tactics; but God heated the water, and their feet and the flesh of their bodies was scalded.

The 17th-century midrashic Sefer haYashar ("Book of Jasher") describes Methuselah with his grandson Noah attempting to persuade the people of the earth to return to godliness. All other very long-lived people died, and Methuselah was the only one of this class left. God planned to bring the flood after all the men who walked in the ways of the Lord had died (besides Noah and his family). Methuselah lived until the ark was built but died before the flood, since God had promised he would not be killed with the unrighteous. The Sefer haYashar gives Methuselah's age at death as 960.

=== Islam ===
Methuselah (Arabic: Matūshalaḥ) is also mentioned in Islam in the various collections of stories of the pre-Islamic prophets, which also say he was an ancestor of Noah. Furthermore, early Islamic writers like Ibn Ishaq and Ibn Hisham always included his name in the genealogy of Muhammad.

=== Mormonism ===
The Book of Moses, a 19th-century Mormon text, says that after Enoch and the City of Zion were taken up to heaven, Methuselah stayed behind; this was so that God's promises to Enoch – that he would always have descendants on earth and that he would be an ancestor of Noah – would be fulfilled. The Church of Jesus Christ of Latter-day Saints further teaches that Methuselah was a prophet.

== Interpretations ==
=== Literal ===
Some biblical literalists claim that Methuselah's long lifespan can be explained by a better diet, or a hypothetical "water vapor canopy" protected the earth from radiation before the Flood. Others claim theological causes: humans were originally to have everlasting life, but sin was introduced into the world by Adam and Eve, and its influence became greater with each generation, before God progressively shortened human life, particularly after the Flood. The Catholic Encyclopedia says "Certain exegetes solve the difficulty to their own satisfaction by declaring that the year meant by the sacred writer is not the equivalent of our year."

=== Mistranslation ===
Some believe that Methuselah's extreme age is the result of an ancient mistranslation that converted "months" to "years", producing a more credible 969 lunar months, or 78½ years, however this would also mean Enoch fathered Methuselah at the age of 5 using numbers from the Masoretic Text. Donald V. Etz suggested that the Genesis 5 numbers "might for convenience have all been multiples of 5 or 10".

Ellen Bennet argued that the Septuagint Genesis 5 numbers are in tenths of years, which "will explain how it was that they read 930 years for the age of Adam instead of 93 years, and 969 years for Methuselah instead of 96 years, and 950 years for that of Noah instead of 95 years"... "Surely it is much more rational to conclude that Noah lived 50 years instead of 500 years before he took a wife and begat Shem, Ham, and Japheth..." and then lists the Septuagint total ages with decimal points: 93.0 for Adam, 91.0 for Cainan, 96.9 for Methuselah, 95.0 for Noah, etc. As mentioned this would mean that Enoch became a father at the age of 6.5 and that the other antediluvian patriarchs did so at implausibly young ages.

=== Myth ===
Yigal Levin states that these long lifespans are intended simply to speed the reader from Adam to Noah. Claus Westermann states they are intended to create the impression of a distant past.

Some versions of the Sumerian King List mention a character named Ubara-Tutu who seems almost identical to Methuselah. He was the son of En-men-dur-ana, a Sumerian mythological figure often compared to Enoch, as he entered heaven without dying. Ubara-Tutu was the king of Sumer until a flood swept over his land. Although the ages of Methuselah and Ubara-Tutu are different, they both died in a Great Flood. Babylonian writer Berossus also claims that, prior to the events of Babylon's flood myth, kings could live for tens of thousands of years, which bears some similarity to Genesis 5. In Forever Young: A Cultural History of Longevity, Lucian Boia says that the Bible's portrayal of Methuselah and other long-lived figures features "traces of the Mesopatamian legends" found in the Epic of Gilgamesh, where Gilgamesh rules Uruk for 126 years, and his ancestors are said to have ruled for several hundred years each. Boia also notes that tales of kings who lived for thousands of years can be found in both Hindu and Chinese mythology, and that the Bible is comparatively "restrained" in depicting early humans as being able to live for hundreds of years, rather than thousands.

Boia notes that following the Flood, the Bible depicts its characters' lifespans as gradually diminishing; Noah's sons lived between 400 and 500 years, while Abraham died at 175, Moses died at 120, and David died at 70, an age that the Bible portrays as old for David's time. Boia compares early biblical figures and their vast lifespans to the people of the Golden Age in Hesiod's poem Works and Days, whose bodies are perpetually youthful.

=== Symbolic ===
Methuselah's father Enoch, who does not die but is taken by God, is the seventh patriarch, and Methuselah, the eighth, dies in the year of the Flood, which ends the ten-generational sequence from Adam to Noah, in whose time the world is destroyed. Boia believes that Methuselah serves the symbolic function of linking the Creation and the Flood, as Adam would have died during Methuselah's lifetime and Methuselah could have learned about the Garden of Eden from Adam. The kings of the Sumerian King List lived for over a thousand years, and Mesopotamians believed both that living over a thousand years made someone divine or somewhat divine, and that their contemporary kings were descended from the kings of the Sumerian King List. Robert Gnuse hypothesizes that the author of Genesis made all of its characters die before they turned one thousand as a polemic against these Mesopotamian beliefs, as well as any claim that a king is divine. Gnuse also believes that the author of Genesis said that Methuselah died before he lived a thousand years to show that he was not divine.

== Cultural influence ==
Methuselah's name "has become a synonym for longevity". Saying that someone is "as old as Methuselah" is a humorous way of saying that someone is very elderly. In this context, dogs which have lived long lives have been described as "Methuselah dogs".

The word "Methuselarity", a blend of Methuselah and singularity, was coined in 2010 by the biomedical gerontologist Aubrey de Grey to mean a future point in time where people are expected not to die from age-related causes anymore, however long they live.

=== Biblical character ===
The lyrics of Ira Gershwin's song "It Ain't Necessarily So" (1935) cast doubt on the idea that Methuselah lived so long.

Methuselah appeared in Darren Aronofsky's 2014 film Noah, with Thor Kjartansson playing him as a youth and Anthony Hopkins playing the elderly character. In the film, Noah's adopted daughter Ila (played by Emma Watson) is infertile until Methuselah blesses her. Aronofsky's version of Methuselah is an eccentric but virtuous hermit who lives on a mountaintop and is friends with Watchers. In this retelling of the Genesis flood, Methuselah dies during the deluge.

=== Plants and animals ===
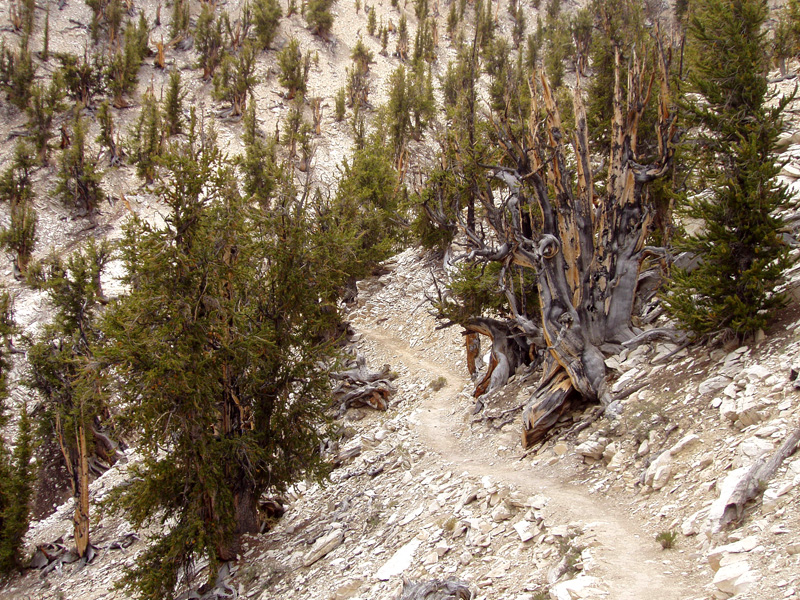
The tree Methuselah

A 4,858-year-old Great Basin bristlecone pine (Pinus longaeva) tree growing high in the White Mountains of Inyo County in eastern California is called Methuselah.

A Judean date palm grown from an ancient seed has been dubbed Methuselah.

The Steinhart Aquarium in the California Academy of Sciences has an Australian lungfish named Methuselah. It is the world's oldest aquarium fish with an estimated age of 93 years old (± 9 years).

=== Science ===
In the 1970s, mathematician John Conway introduced the Game of Life, a cellular automaton. In cellular automata, methuselahs refer to a small initial state of cells that continue to grow for a large number of generations.

The subgiant star HD 140283, believed to be the oldest extant star discovered, is often nicknamed "The Methuselah Star" after the ancient biblical figure. The name is also used to refer to the exoplanet PSR B1620−26 b, which is one of the oldest known exoplanets with an estimated age of 12.7 billion years old.

=== Fictional characters ===
The Robert A. Heinlein novel Methuselah's Children (1958) uses Methuselah's proverbial age as its title reference. The novel deals with a colony of long-lived people including Lazarus Long, who reappears in later Heinlein novels.

The character Flint from the Star Trek: The Original Series episode "Requiem for Methuselah" is a nearly immortal man from Earth. one of several identities he claims to have lived in his long life was that of Methuselah, as well as Lazarus, Alexander the Great, and Leonardo da Vinci.

In the TV series Altered Carbon, based on Richard K. Morgan's 2002 novel of the same name, a class of people who can afford to live forever by transferring their consciousness into cloned bodies are called "Meths" or "Methuselahs".

In the children's literature series Redwall, Brian Jacques has multiple anthropomorphic characters named after several biblical figures, one of which is an old abbey mouse named Methuselah, who is described to be the oldest mouse to have ever lived in Redwall Abbey.

A giant monster or "Titan" named Methuselah appears in the 2019 film Godzilla: King of the Monsters, residing in Monarch Outpost 67 in Munich, Germany. In the film, it is woken up by King Ghidorah alongside the other Titans. It also makes an appearance in the 2021 graphic novel Godzilla Dominion.

== Gallery ==
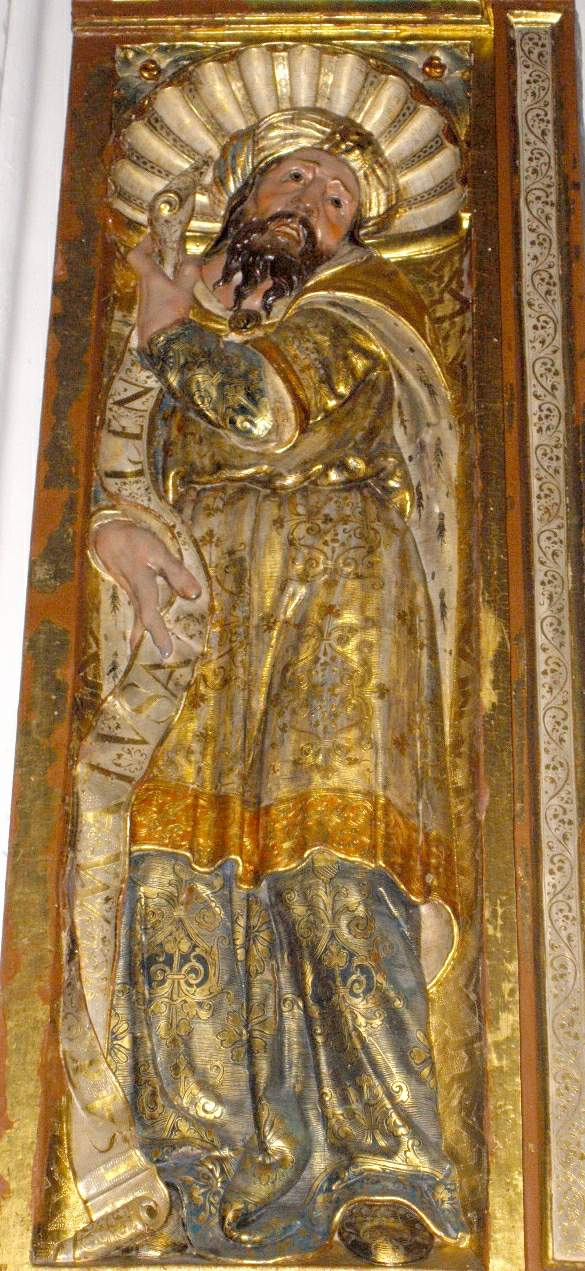
A depiction of Methuselah at the Church of San Juan Bautista in Carbonero el Mayor, Segovia Province, Spain

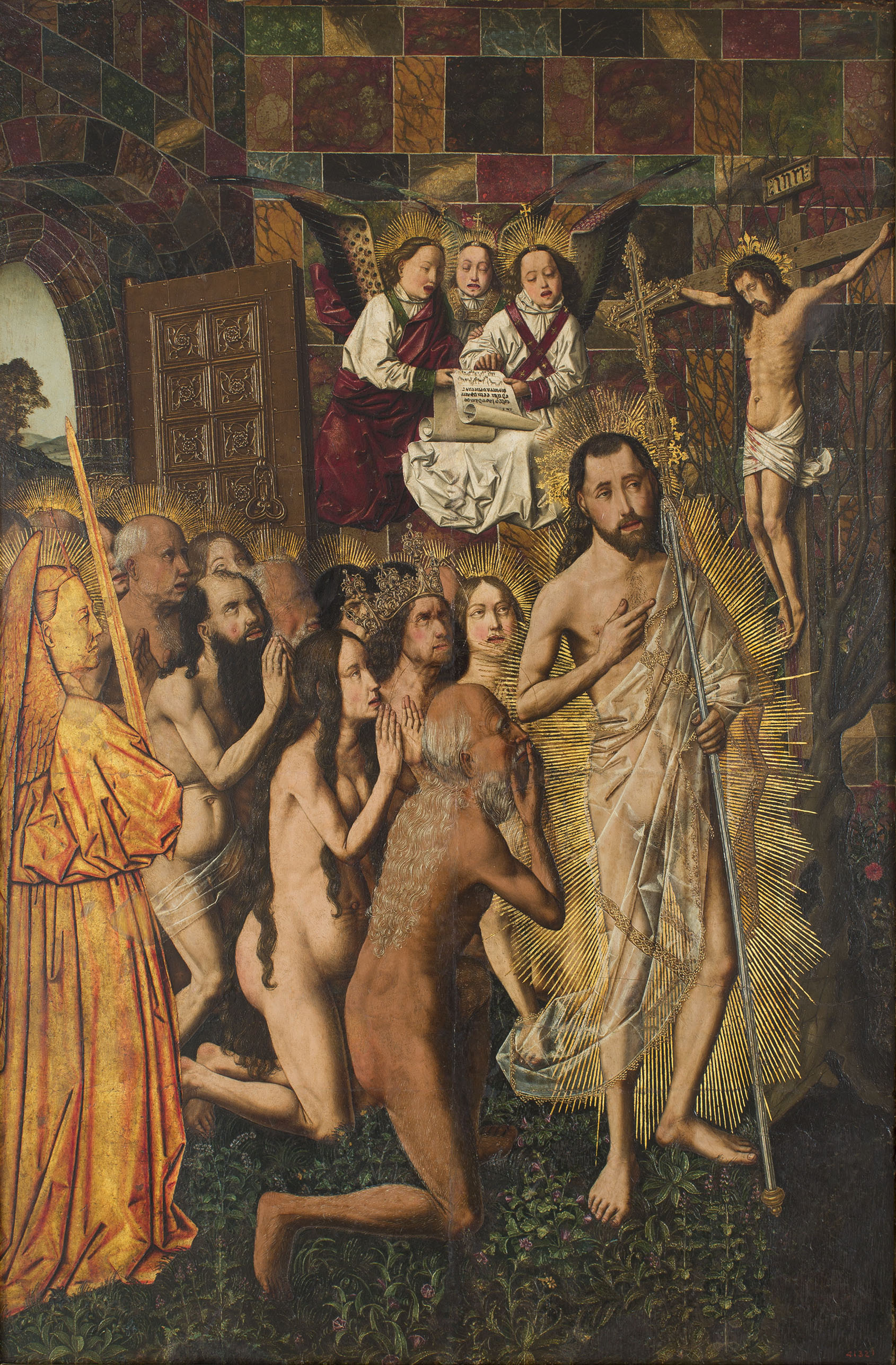
Bartolomé Bermejo, Christ Leading the Patriarchs to Paradise, c. 1480. In this depiction of the Harrowing of Hell, Methuselah is portrayed as leading the procession of the righteous behind Jesus, along with Solomon, the Queen of Sheba, and Adam and Eve.

== Family tree ==
Adam (Note: Genesis 4:1)	Eve
Cain	Abel (Note: Genesis 4:2)	Seth (Note: Genesis 4:25; 5:3)
Enoch (Note: Genesis 4:17)	Enos (Note: Genesis 4:26; 5:6–7)
Irad (Note: Genesis 4:18)	Kenan (Note: Genesis 5:9–10)
Mehujael	Mahalalel (Note: Genesis 5:12–13)
Methushael	Jared (Note: Genesis 5:15–16)
Adah (Note: Genesis 4:19)	Lamech	Zillah	Enoch (Note: Genesis 5:18–19)
Jabal (Note: Genesis 4:20)	Jubal (Note: Genesis 4:21)	Tubal-Cain (Note: Genesis 4:22)	Naamah	Methuselah (Note: Genesis 5:21–22)
Lamech (Note: Genesis 5:25–26)
Noah (Note: Genesis 5:28–30)
Shem (Note: Genesis 5:32)	Ham	Japheth

== See also ==
- Aging
- Jeanne Calment
- Genealogies of Genesis
- Longevity
- Longevity myths
- Maximum life span
- Oldest people

== Bibliography ==
- Boia, Lucian (1998), Forever Young: A Cultural History of Longevity, 79 Farringdon Rd, London: Reaktion Books Ltd, ISBN 1-86189-154-7
- Gnuse, Robert (2014), Misunderstood Stories: Theological Commentary on Genesis 1-11, Eugene, Oregon: Cascade Books, ISBN 978-1-62564-007-9
