= Fuzzy Duck (band) =

English progressive rock group

- Origin: London, England
- Genres: Progressive rock; hard rock
- Years active: 1970–1971
- Labels: MAM; Repertoire
- Past members: Mick Hawksworth; Roy Sharland; Paul Francis; Grahame White; Garth Watt Roy

Fuzzy Duck were an English progressive rock/ hard rock group from London, formed in 1970.

== Career ==
The group's self-titled studio album Fuzzy Duck was released in 1971 on the MAM label. It featured bassist/vocalist Mick Hawksworth of Five Day Week Straw People, Killing Floor and Andromeda, as well as Crazy World of Arthur Brown keyboardist Roy Sharland and drummer Paul Francis of Tucky Buzzard (and later of Tranquility).

The group disbanded soon after the release of their album, but enduring interest in the band led to reissues on CD by Akarma, Esoteric and Repertoire Records.

Additionally, in 1971 vocalist Garth Watt-Roy (the elder brother of bass player Norman Watt-Roy) was asked by the band Steamhammer to provide vocals for their album, Speech (released in 1972 and produced by former Yardbirds vocalist Keith Relf). He also played guitar and sang with East of Eden and, in the 1980s, he played guitar on the Goodbye to the Island album by Bonnie Tyler, as well as with Paul Young and the Q-Tips.

== Discography ==
=== Singles ===
- "Double Time Woman" / "Just Look Around You" (1971)
- "Big Brass Band" / "One More Hour" (1971)

=== Albums ===
- Fuzzy Duck (1971)
