= Methuselah (cellular automaton) =

Type of pattern that takes many generations to stabilize

The "die hard" methuselah lives for 130 generations before all cells die.

In cellular automata, a methuselah is a small "seed" pattern of initial live cells that take a large number of generations in order to stabilize. More specifically, Martin Gardner defines them as patterns of fewer than ten live cells which take longer than 50 generations to stabilize, although some patterns that are larger than ten cells have also been called methuselahs. Patterns must eventually stabilize to be considered methuselahs. The term comes from the Biblical Methuselah, who lived for 969 years.

== In Conway's Game of Life ==

R-pentomino to stability in 1103 generations

In Conway's Game of Life, one of the smallest methuselahs is the R-pentomino, a pattern of five cells first considered by Conway himself, that takes 1103 generations before stabilizing with 116 cells. The acorn, a pattern of only seven live cells developed by Charles Corderman, takes 5206 generations to stabilize and produce a 633-cell pattern referred to as its "oak". Some other examples of methuselahs are called bunnies and rabbits.
