= An Old Raincoat Won't Ever Let You Down =

Studio album by Rod Stewart
- Released: November 1969 (US); February 1970 (UK)
- Recorded: June–August 1969
- Studios: Lansdowne and Olympic Studios, London
- Genre: British folk rock
- Length: 32:47
- Labels: Vertigo, Mercury, Fontana
- Producers: Rod Stewart, Lou Reizner

Rod Stewart chronology
An Old Raincoat Won't Ever Let You Down (1969)	Gasoline Alley (1970)

U.S. release title / cover
- The Rod Stewart Album (Mercury)

Singles from An Old Raincoat Won't Ever Let You Down
- 1. "Street Fighting Man" Released: December 1969; 2. "Handbags and Gladrags" Released: May 1970 (US)

An Old Raincoat Won't Ever Let You Down is the debut solo studio album by Rod Stewart. First released in the United States in November 1969 as The Rod Stewart Album, the album peaked at No. 139 on the US Billboard 200 album chart. It was released in the United Kingdom with the modified title in February 1970. Stewart's Faces bandmates Ronnie Wood and Ian McLagan also appear on the album, along with Keith Emerson, Jeff Beck Group drummer Micky Waller and guitarists Martin Pugh (of Steamhammer, and later Armageddon and 7th Order) and Martin Quittenton (also from Steamhammer).

== Reception ==
Professional ratings
Review scores
Source	Rating
Allmusic	4.5/5 stars
Rolling Stone	(favorable)
Robert Christgau	A−

The album received positive reviews from Fusion, Rolling Stone, and Robert Christgau. Christgau felt the album was "superb", the same wording as used by Greil Marcus in his Rolling Stone review.

In a retrospective summary for Rolling Stone, a staff writer felt that Stewart's solo debut showed him as a "highly original interpreter" of other people's songs, and that his own compositions indicated he was "capable of startlingly bare emotion and compassion".

== Track listing ==
All tracks are written by Rod Stewart, except where indicated.

Side one
No.	Title	Writer(s)	Length
1.	"Street Fighting Man"	Mick Jagger, Keith Richards	5:05
2.	"Man of Constant Sorrow"	Traditional; arranged by Stewart	2:30
3.	"Blind Prayer"		4:36
4.	"Handbags and Gladrags"	Mike d'Abo	4:24

Side two
No.	Title	Writer(s)	Length
1.	"An Old Raincoat Won't Ever Let You Down"		3:05
2.	"I Wouldn't Ever Change a Thing"		4:44
3.	"Cindy's Lament"		4:26
4.	"Dirty Old Town"	Ewan MacColl	3:42
Total length:			32:47

== Personnel ==
- Rod Stewart – vocals, guitars on "Man of Constant Sorrow"
- Ronnie Wood – guitars (including bottleneck slide), bass, harmonica on "Dirty Old Town"
- Martin Pugh – guitars
- Martin Quittenton – acoustic guitar
- Ian McLagan – piano, organ
- Micky Waller – drums
- Mike d'Abo – piano on "Handbags and Gladrags"
- Lou Reizner – vocals on "I Wouldn't Ever Change a Thing"
- Keith Emerson – organ on "I Wouldn't Ever Change a Thing"

== Technical ==
- Keith "Marcus Keef" MacMillan – design, photography

== Charts ==
Chart (1969–70)	Peak position
Australian Albums (Kent Music Report)	31
US Billboard 200	139
