= Reason to Believe =

Single of Rod Stewart

"Reason to Believe" is a song written, composed, and first recorded by American folk singer Tim Hardin in 1965. The song, a post-breakup reminiscence, has since been recorded by many artists, most notably by the Carpenters on their album Close to You in 1970, and Rod Stewart first for his album Every Picture Tells a Story in 1971 and again for the live album Unplugged...and Seated in 1993. Other artists who recorded notable cover versions include Karen Dalton, The Youngbloods, Bobby Darin, Glen Campbell, Johnny Cash ,Marianne Faithfull, Peter, Paul and Mary, Damita Jo DeBlanc, Vince Guaraldi, Anne Murray and Wilson Phillips. A lesser-known cover version was recorded by Mason Williams on his 1970 album Hand Made.

== Tim Hardin version ==
After having had his recording contract terminated by Columbia Records, Tim Hardin achieved some success in the 1960s as a songwriter based in Greenwich Village. The original recording of "Reason to Believe" comes from Hardin's debut album, Tim Hardin 1, recorded in 1965 and released on the Verve Records label in 1966 when he was 25. Hardin's original recording of the song is also on the soundtrack to the 2000 film Wonder Boys.

== The Carpenters version ==
The Carpenters recorded "Reason to Believe" for their second LP, Close to You, in 1970. On television, the duo performed their version on The 5th Dimension Travelling Sunshine Show on August 18, 1971 and Make Your Own Kind of Music on September 7, 1971. Richard Carpenter remixed the song for the release of the 1995 compilation, Interpretations: A 25th Anniversary Celebration.

== Rod Stewart versions ==
"Reason to Believe"
- German picture sleeve

Single by Rod Stewart

from the album Every Picture Tells a Story
- B-side: "Maggie May"
- Released: July 1971
- Length: 4:10
- Label: Mercury
- Songwriter: Tim Hardin
- Producer: Rod Stewart

Rod Stewart singles chronology
"It's All Over Now" (1970)	"Reason to Believe" (1971)	"(I Know) I'm Losing You" (1971)

"Reason to Believe (live)"

Single by Rod Stewart

from the album Unplugged...and Seated
- B-side: "It's All Over Now" (live)
- Released: August 9, 1993
- Length: 4:07
- Label: Warner Bros.
- Songwriter: Tim Hardin
- Producer: Patrick Leonard

Rod Stewart singles chronology
"Have I Told You Lately (live)" (1993)	"Reason to Believe (live)" (1993)	"People Get Ready (live)" (1993)

=== Background ===
British singer and songwriter Rod Stewart's version of "Reason to Believe" appeared as the first single from his 1971 album, Every Picture Tells a Story, with "Maggie May" as the B-side. "Reason to Believe" reached No. 62 on the Billboard Hot 100 on its own before the more popular B-side overtook it on its way to No. 1 on the chart. The Hot 100 listed "Reason To Believe" as the flip side for the remaining 16 weeks of that run. Stewart's double-sided hit, which topped the Hot 100 during all five chart weeks of October 1971, held the Carpenters' "Superstar" at No. 2 during the third and fourth of those weeks.

Stewart's version is noted for its instrumentation, featuring a piano, which is heard playing the slow introduction, before Stewart's voice is heard singing. This is followed by an electric organ, drums, and an acoustic guitar. It also features a solo violin, which is heard during the instrumental break of the bridge. The piano, along with the organ, play the outro. There is a 2-second pause, before Stewart's vocal is heard singing the bridge in a cappella, ("Someone like you"), before the piano enters, followed by the violin, the drums and the guitar, featuring a rhythm change from 2/4 to 3/4 for a few measures, before reverting to the 2/4 rhythm, with Stewart repeating the bridge before he stops singing, with the instruments carrying on the melody to through the song's fade. The organist was not present during the repeated bridge session.

A live version was released in 1993 on the album Unplugged...and Seated. Released as the second single from the album in August 1993 and entering the Hot 100 on August 14, 1993, twenty-two years to the date when it was last listed as the front side in 1971, it reached No. 19 on the Billboard Hot 100 and No. 3 on the Canadian RPM Top Singles chart. The 1993 single includes a live version of "It's All Over Now", which was recorded during the MTV Unplugged performance but does not appear on the album.

Altogether, the two versions of "Reason to Believe" logged a total of 41 weeks on the Hot 100, just behind the 42 weeks total for "Have I Told You Lately" for most weeks by a Rod Stewart song.

=== Charts ===
==== Weekly charts ====
Original version

Chart (1971)	Peak position
Belgium (Ultratop 50 Flanders)	24
Canada Top Singles (RPM)	24
UK Singles (Official Charts); Double A-side with "Maggie May"	1
US Billboard Hot 100	62
US Cash Box Top 100	80
US Record World Singles Chart	29

Live version

Chart (1993)	Peak position
Canada Retail Singles (The Record)	9
Canada Top Singles (RPM)	3
Canada Adult Contemporary (RPM)	1
Germany (GfK)	79
Iceland (Íslenski Listinn Topp 40)	15
UK Singles (Official Charts)	51
UK Airplay (Music Week)	35
US Billboard Hot 100	19
US Adult Contemporary (Billboard)	2
US Pop Airplay (Billboard)	24
US Cash Box Top 100	10

==== Year-end charts ====
Live version

Chart (1993)	Position
Canada Top Singles (RPM)	22
Canada Adult Contemporary (RPM)	3
US Billboard Hot 100	90
US Adult Contemporary (Billboard)	23

Chart (1994)	Position
US Adult Contemporary (Billboard)	44

== Certifications ==
Region	Certification	Certified units/sales
New Zealand (RMNZ)	Gold	10,000^{*}
^{*} Sales figures based on certification alone.
