= Every Picture Tells a Story =

Studio album by Rod Stewart
- Released: 28 May 1971
- Recorded: November 1970−January 1971
- Studios: Morgan, London
- Genres: Folk rock; roots rock
- Length: 40:31
- Label: Mercury
- Producer: Rod Stewart

Rod Stewart chronology
Gasoline Alley (1970)	Every Picture Tells a Story (1971)	Never a Dull Moment (1972)

Singles from Every Picture Tells a Story
- 1. "Reason to Believe" / "Maggie May" Released: July 1971 (US); 2. "(I Know) I'm Losing You" Released: October 1971; 3. "Every Picture Tells a Story" Released: 1972

Every Picture Tells a Story is the third studio album by British singer-songwriter Rod Stewart, released on 28 May 1971, by Mercury Records. It incorporates hard rock, folk, and blues styles. It went to number one on both the UK and US charts and finished third in the Jazz & Pop critics' poll for best album of 1971. It has been an enduring critical success, including being ranked number 172 on Rolling Stone's 2003 list of the "500 Greatest Albums of All Time", repositioned to number 177 in the 2020 revision.

== History ==
This album is a mixture of rock, country, blues, soul, and folk, and includes Stewart's breakthrough hit, "Maggie May", as well as "Reason to Believe", a song from Tim Hardin's debut album of 1966. "Reason to Believe", with Pete Sears on piano, was released as the first single from the album with "Maggie May" as the B-side; however, "Maggie May" became more popular and was a No. 1 hit in both the UK and US.

The album includes a version of Arthur Crudup's "That's All Right (Mama)" (the first single for Elvis Presley) and a cover of the Bob Dylan song "Tomorrow Is a Long Time", which was first released on 1971's Bob Dylan's Greatest Hits Vol. II).

All five members of the Faces (with whom Stewart at that time was lead vocalist) appear on the album, with guitarist/bassist Ronnie Wood and keyboardist Ian McLagan on Hammond B3 organ being employed most. Due to contractual restrictions, the personnel listings were somewhat vague, and it was unclear that the full Faces line-up recorded the version of the Motown hit "(I Know) I'm Losing You". Stewart expressly acknowledged at the 2015 Hurtwood Park reunion that on the album the song was performed by the Faces. Other contributors included Ray Jackson on mandolin (though Stewart allegedly forgot his name and merely mentioned "the mandolin player in Lindisfarne" on the sleeve), Martin Quittenton on acoustic guitar, and Micky Waller on drums. Maggie Bell performed backing vocals (mentioned on the sleeve as "vocal abrasives") on the title track, and Madeline Bell sang backup on the next track, "Seems Like A Long Time". Pete Sears played all the piano on the album except for one track, "I'm Losing You", which had Ian McLagan on piano, along with the Faces as a band.

The album reached the number-one position in both the UK (for six weeks) and the US (four weeks) at the same time that "Maggie May" was topping the singles charts in both territories.

The Temptations cover, "I Know I'm Losing You" reached the top 40 at No. 24 on the Billboard Hot 100 in the US.

== Critical reception and legacy ==
Professional ratings
Review scores
Source	Rating
AllMusic	5/5 stars
Christgau's Record Guide	A+
The Encyclopedia of Popular Music	4/5 stars
The Great Rock Discography	9/10
Pitchfork	9.4/10
The Rolling Stone Album Guide	5/5 stars

In his original Rolling Stone review, John Mendelsohn wrote: "Boring as half of it may be, there's enough that is unqualifiedly magnificent on the other half." However, Village Voice critic Robert Christgau gave the album a glowing review, writing: "Rod the Wordslinger is a lot more literate than the typical English bloozeman, Rod the Singer can make words flesh, and though Rod the Bandleader's music is literally electric it's the mandolin and pedal steel that come through sharpest."

A retrospective review by Pitchfork's Tal Rosenberg called it "a rollicking and surprisingly grounded document of early '70s folk-rock".

The album has been an enduring critical success, including a number 172 ranking on Rolling Stone's 2003 list of the 500 greatest albums of all time, maintaining the rating in a 2012 revised list, dropping slightly in a 2020 revised list to number 177. In 1992, the album was awarded the number-one spot in Jimmy Guterman's book The Best Rock 'N' Roll Records of All Time: A Fan's Guide to the Stuff You Love. It was ranked 99th in a 2005 survey held by British television's Channel 4 to determine the 100 greatest albums of all time.

In a retrospective review for AllMusic, Stephen Thomas Erlewine wrote: "Without greatly altering his approach, Rod Stewart perfected his blend of hard rock, folk, and blues on his masterpiece, Every Picture Tells a Story." Writing in The Rough Guide to Rock (1999), Nicholas Oliver wrote that Stewart broke through commercially on "an artistic high", adding that it features well-chosen covers and strong original material. Martin C. Strong of The Great Rock Discography (2006) described the album as the creative pinnacle of Stewart's career, naming it "a masterclass in roots rock." "Mandolin Wind" was highlighted as the best original song by both Oliver and Strong, with Oliver calling it "peerless" and Strong naming it one of Stewart's "most perfectly conceived originals". Tony Parsons of The Observer named it his favourite British album, writing that Stewart "made the best records that Seventies teenagers had ever heard. Great voice, great songs, great haircuts and acoustic guitars that were played like electric guitars."

== Track listing ==
Side one
No.	Title	Writer(s)	Length
1.	"Every Picture Tells a Story"	Rod Stewart, Ronnie Wood	6:01
2.	"Seems Like a Long Time"	Theodore Anderson	4:02
3.	"That's All Right / Amazing Grace"	Arthur Crudup / traditional; arranged by Stewart	6:02
4.	"Tomorrow Is a Long Time"	Bob Dylan	3:43

Side two
No.	Title	Writer(s)	Length
1.	"Henry"	Martin Quittenton	0:32
2.	"Maggie May"	Stewart, Quittenton	5:15
3.	"Mandolin Wind"	Stewart	5:33
4.	"(I Know) I'm Losing You"	Norman Whitfield, Eddie Holland, Cornelius Grant	5:23
5.	"(Find a) Reason to Believe"	Tim Hardin	4:05
Total length:			40:31

Notes

- "Henry" was only printed on the label of the original British and international releases, not on the sleeve. It was omitted in the track listing of some CD versions, as in some pressings of the album and most Stewart compilations, the "Henry" intro is incorporated into the full "Maggie May" track.
- "Amazing Grace" is not listed on the label on most editions, and on some CDs is part of "That's All Right". Played by Sam Mitchell.

== Personnel ==
- Rod Stewart – lead vocals, acoustic guitar
- Ronnie Wood – guitar, pedal steel guitar, bass guitar
- Martin Quittenton – acoustic guitar
- Ray Jackson ("the mandolin player in Lindisfarne") – mandolin
- Sam Mitchell – slide guitar
- Andy Pyle – bass guitar
- Ronnie Lane – bass guitar and backing vocals on "(I Know) I'm Losing You" (uncredited)
- Danny Thompson – upright bass
- Dick Powell – violin
- Ian McLagan – Hammond organ, piano on "(I Know) I'm Losing You"
- Pete Sears – piano, celeste
- Long John Baldry – vocals on "Every Picture Tells a Story"
- Maggie Bell – "vocal abrasives" on "Every Picture Tells a Story"
- Madeline Bell and friends – "vocal abrasives" on "Seems Like a Long Time"
- Micky Waller – drums
- Kenney Jones – drums on "(I Know) I'm Losing You" (uncredited)
- Spike Heatley – double bass on “Reason to Believe”

On the album's liner notes, the names of two alcoholic beverages (Martell Cognac and Mateus Rosé) are interspersed amongst the personnel credits.

Technical

- Desmond Strobel – art direction
- John Craig – design, illustration
- Lisa Margolis – front cover photo
- Aaron Sixx – back cover photo

== Charts ==
=== Weekly charts ===
Chart (1971–73)	Peak position
Australian Albums (Kent Music Report)	1
Canada Top Albums/CDs (RPM)	1
Finnish Albums (The Official Finnish Charts)	8
German Albums (Offizielle Top 100)	23
Italian Albums (Musica e Dischi)	20
Japanese Albums (Oricon)	84
Dutch Albums (Album Top 100)	2
Norwegian Albums (VG-lista)	9
Spanish Albums (AFYVE)	4
Swedish Albums (Sverigetopplistan)	5
UK Albums (Official Charts)	1
US Billboard 200	1

=== Year-end charts ===
Chart (1971)	Position
Australian Albums Kent Music Report	17
Dutch Albums (Album Top 100)	5
UK Albums (OCC	2
US Billboard 200	34

Chart (1972)	Position
Australian Albums Kent Music Report	23
Dutch Albums (Album Top 100)	47
US Billboard 200	65

== Certifications ==
Region	Certification	Certified units/sales
New Zealand (RMNZ)	2× Gold	15,000^{^}
United Kingdom (BPI)	Gold	100,000^{‡}
United States (RIAA)	Platinum	2,500,000
^{^} Shipments figures based on certification alone.^{‡} Sales+streaming figures based on certification alone.
