= You Wear It Well =

Single by Rod Stewart

from the album Never a Dull Moment
- B-side: "Lost Paraguayos"
- Released: August 1972
- Genre: Folk rock
- Length: 4:09 (Single Version); 4:25 (Album Version); 5:04 ("Storyteller" Version)
- Label: Mercury
- Songwriters: Rod Stewart, Martin Quittenton

Rod Stewart singles chronology
"Handbags and Gladrags" (1972)	"You Wear It Well" (1972)	"Angel" (1972)

Official audio
- "You Wear It Well" on YouTube

"You Wear It Well" is a song written by Rod Stewart and Martin Quittenton, performed by Stewart. It has been seen as an arrangement of "Maggie May", one of Stewart's hits from the previous year.

Stewart recorded "You Wear It Well" for the 1972 album Never a Dull Moment, and released it as a single on 12 August. The song became an international hit, reaching number one on the UK Singles Chart. In the US, it peaked at number 13 on the Billboard Hot 100.

Upon the release of the single, Record World felt that it "could equal ['Maggie May''s] phenomenal success."

Stewart performed the song live on BBC's Top of the Pops with the full lineup of Faces, along with Quittenton on classical guitar and Dick "Tricky Dicky" Powell on fiddle joining them. A live version of the song from his 2013 performance at the Troubadour, West Hollywood was included on the deluxe edition of the album Time.

== Chart performance ==
=== Weekly charts ===
Chart (1972)	Peak position
Australia Kent Music Report	13
Canada RPM Top Singles	7
Germany	35
Ireland	2
New Zealand (Listener)	4
South Africa	19
UK Singles Chart	1
US Billboard Hot 100	13
US Cash Box Top 100	14

=== Year-end charts ===
Chart (1972)	Rank
Australia	76
UK	14
U.S. (Joel Whitburn's Pop Annual)	120

== Cover versions ==
- The 1999 compilation album I Have Been To Heaven And Back: Hen's Teeth and Other Lost Fragments of Unpopular Culture Vol. 1 by the Mekons includes a cover of the song.
- Ali Campbell covered the song on his 2010 album Great British Songs.
- In 2016 Dexys featuring Kevin Rowland covered the song on their album Let The Record Show: Dexys Do Irish And Country Soul
- A cover by Hurricane No. 1 is included in their compilation Step into My World.
- In 2022 The Black Crowes covered the song on their 1972 EP.
