= Gasoline Alley (album) =

1970 studio album by Rod Stewart

Studio album by Rod Stewart
- Released: 12 June 1970
- Recorded: February–April 1970
- Studios: Morgan Studios, London
- Length: 42:30
- Labels: Mercury, Vertigo
- Producers: Rod Stewart, Lou Reizner

Rod Stewart chronology
An Old Raincoat Won't Ever Let You Down (1969)	Gasoline Alley (1970)	Every Picture Tells a Story (1971)

Gasoline Alley is the second solo studio album by the British singer-songwriter Rod Stewart. It was released on 12 June 1970 by Vertigo Records. It is a collection of covers combined with Stewart's own compositions. Like many of Stewart's solo albums from the period, it featured significant musical contributions from the other members of his band Faces.

== Reception ==
Professional ratings
Review scores
Source	Rating
AllMusic	5/5 stars
Christgau's Record Guide	A−
Rolling Stone	(favourable)
The Rolling Stone Album Guide	4.5/5 stars
The Village Voice	B+

The album was well received, with Langdon Winner of Rolling Stone feeling that Stewart had "a rare sensitivity for the delicate moments in a person's existence", and that this, Stewart's second solo album, was the work "of a supremely fine artist".

== Track listing ==
No.	Title	Writer(s)	Length
1.	"Gasoline Alley"	Stewart, Ronnie Wood	4:02
2.	"It's All Over Now"	Bobby Womack, Shirley Jean Womack	6:22
3.	"Only a Hobo"	Bob Dylan	4:13
4.	"My Way of Giving"	Ronnie Lane, Steve Marriott	3:55
5.	"Country Comfort"	Elton John, Bernie Taupin	4:42
6.	"Cut Across Shorty"	Wayne P. Walker, Marijohn Wilkin	6:28
7.	"Lady Day"	Stewart	3:57
8.	"Jo's Lament"	Stewart	3:24
9.	"You're My Girl (I Don't Want to Discuss It)"	Dick Cooper, Beth Beatty, Ernie Shelby	4:27

CD bonus track
No.	Title	Writer(s)	Length
10.	"It's All Over Now" (single version)	Bobby Womack, Shirley Jean Womack	3:35

== Personnel ==
- Rod Stewart – lead vocals, acoustic guitar on "Jo's Lament"
- Ronnie Wood – guitar, acoustic guitar, bass guitar
- Martin Quittenton – acoustic guitar
- Stanley Matthews – mandolin
- Ronnie Lane – bass on "My Way Of Giving" and "You're My Girl", backing vocals on "My Way Of Giving"
- Pete Sears – piano on "Country Comfort", bass on "Cut Across Shorty".
- Ian McLagan – piano, Hammond organ (the UK credit list notes: "Mac not available due to bus strike", while the US release credits him)
- Mick Waller – drums
- Kenney Jones – drums on "My Way Of Giving" and "You're My Girl"
- William Gaff – whistle
- Dennis O'Flynn, Dick Powell – violin
- Jack Reynolds – backing vocals on "Country Comfort"

== Production ==
- Producers – Rod Stewart and Lou Reizner
- Mastering – Gilbert Kong at Masterdisk (New York, NY)
- Album Design and Photography – Marcus Keef at Colbeck Mews, Kensington

== Notable covers by other artists ==
- Elkie Brooks later achieved a hit with a version of the title track in 1983.

Chart (1983)	Peak position	Ref.
UK Top 100 Airplay	12	
UK Singles Charts	52	
Irish Singles Charts	15	

- Long John Baldry (with whom Stewart had previously worked in the bands Hoochie Coochie Men and Steampacket) covered the title song for his 1973 album Good To Be Alive.

== Charts ==
Chart (1970–71)	Peak position
Australian Albums (Kent Music Report)	24
Canada Top Albums/CDs (RPM)	32
UK Albums (Official Charts)	62
US Billboard 200	27
