= Kieran White =

Blues-rock musician, vocalist

Kieran Raymond White (July 27, 1948 – August 9, 1995) was an English baritone rock vocalist and guitarist. He sang and played in the blues-rock band Steamhammer, formed in 1968. Their debut album, Steamhammer. was released in 1969, on which White co-wrote many of the songs and played harmonica.

White left Steamhammer in 1971 and recorded a solo album, Open Door (released in 1975). He also worked for Gull Records as a staff songwriter, and later sang for the jazz-rock band Nucleus. After this period, he emigrated to the United States and became a truck driver, settling in Oregon. He died there in 1995 from cancer.
