= Maggie May =

1971 single by Rod Stewart

- German picture sleeve

Single by Rod Stewart

from the album Every Picture Tells a Story
- A-side: "Reason to Believe"
- Released: July 1971
- Recorded: 1970
- Genre: Folk rock; soft rock
- Length: 5:50 (album version w/ Henry intro); 5:14 (single version)
- Label: Mercury
- Songwriters: Rod Stewart; Martin Quittenton
- Producer: Rod Stewart

Rod Stewart singles chronology
"It's All Over Now" (1970)	"Reason to Believe" / "Maggie May" (1971)	"(I Know) I'm Losing You" (1971)

"Maggie May" is a song co-written by singer Rod Stewart and Martin Quittenton, performed by Stewart for his album Every Picture Tells a Story, released in 1971. In 2004, Rolling Stone ranked it number 130 in The 500 Greatest Songs of All Time. In 2017, the Mercury Records single was inducted into the Grammy Hall of Fame. The song is regarded as Stewart's signature song.

== Background ==
Written from Stewart's personal experience, "Maggie May" expresses the ambivalence and contradictory emotions of a boy involved in a relationship with an older woman. In the January 2007 issue of Q magazine, Stewart recalled: "Maggie May was a true story, about the first woman I had sex with, at the 1961 Beaulieu Jazz Festival." The woman's name was not "Maggie May"; Stewart has stated that the name was taken from "an old Liverpudlian song about a prostitute".

The song was recorded in just two takes in one session. Drummer Micky Waller often arrived at recording sessions with the expectation that a drum kit would be provided and, for "Maggie May", it was – except that no cymbals could be found. The cymbal crashes had to be overdubbed separately some days later.

The song was released as the B-side of the single "Reason to Believe", but soon radio stations began playing the B-side and "Maggie May" became the more popular side. The song was Stewart's first substantial hit as a solo performer and launched his solo career. It remains one of his best-known songs. A 1971 performance of the song on Top of the Pops saw the Faces joined onstage by DJ John Peel, who pretended to play the mandolin. The mandolin player on the actual recording was Ray Jackson of Lindisfarne. Jackson wrote and developed the mandolin piece at the start and middle of the song, but got no recognition, nor royalties from Stewart other than £15.00 for the recording session, and a mention on Stewart's Every Picture Tells a Story album, which famously reads: “The mandolin was played by the mandolin player in Lindisfarne. The name slips my mind.”

The album version of "Maggie May" incorporates a 30-second solo guitar intro, "Henry", composed by Martin Quittenton.

The original recording has appeared on almost all of Rod Stewart's compilations, and even appeared on the Ronnie Wood retrospective Ronnie Wood Anthology: The Essential Crossexion. A version by the Faces recorded for BBC Radio appeared on the four-disc box set Five Guys Walk into a Bar.... A live version recorded in 1993 by Stewart joined by Wood for a session of MTV Unplugged is included on the album Unplugged...and Seated.

== Chart performance ==
In October 1971, the song went to number one on the UK Singles Chart (for five weeks), and simultaneously topped the charts in Australia (four weeks), Canada (one week), and the United States (five weeks). It was the No. 2 record for 1971 on both the US Billboard Hot 100 and UK singles charts.

The song re-entered the UK chart in December 1976, but only reached number 31.

At first, I didn't think much of "Maggie May". I guess that's because the record company didn't believe in the song. I didn't have much confidence then. I figured it was best to listen to the guys who knew better. What I learned is sometimes they do and sometimes they don't.

— Rod Stewart, 2015

=== Weekly charts ===
Chart (1971)	Peak position
Australia Go-Set National Top 40	1
Canada	1
Germany	11
Ireland	2
Netherlands (Dutch Top 40)	3
Netherlands (Single Top 100)	3
New Zealand	3
Switzerland	5
UK Singles Chart	1
US Billboard Hot 100	1
US Cash Box Top 100	1
Zimbabwe (ZIMA)	8

Chart (1976)	Peak position
Ireland	13
UK	31

=== Year-end charts ===
Chart (1971)	Rank
Canada	19
Netherlands (Dutch Top 40)	21
Netherlands (Single Top 100)	13
UK	2
US Billboard Hot 100	2
US Cash Box Top 100	23

=== All-time charts ===
Chart (1958–2018)	Position
US Billboard Hot 100	182

== Certifications ==
Region	Certification	Certified units/sales
New Zealand (RMNZ)	3× Platinum	90,000^{‡}
United Kingdom (BPI)	Platinum	600,000^{‡}
United States (RIAA)	2× Platinum	2,000,000^{‡}
^{‡} Sales+streaming figures based on certification alone.

== Personnel ==
- Rod Stewart – lead vocals
- Ronnie Wood – electric guitar, twelve-string guitar, bass guitar
- Martin Quittenton – acoustic guitar
- Micky Waller – drums, cymbals
- Ian McLagan – Hammond organ
- Ray Jackson – mandolin (listed on the album as "The mandolin was played by the mandolin player in Lindisfarne. The name slips my mind.")
- Pete Sears – celesta

== Blur cover ==
The English alternative rock band Blur released a cover of "Maggie May" in 1993, for a CD given away with UK rock magazine Q.

== See also ==
- Maggie May (folk song)
