= Martin Quittenton =

British guitarist and composer

Martin Quittenton (22 April 1945 – 16 April 2015) was a British guitarist and composer. He played in the blues rock band Steamhammer, formed in 1968. Their debut album Steamhammer was released in 1969.

Quittenton also worked with Rod Stewart, along with Pete Sears, Micky Waller, and fellow Steamhammer guitarist Martin Pugh. In collaboration with Stewart, Quittenton co-wrote the international hit singles "Maggie May" and "You Wear It Well", along with the British top ten single "Farewell", from Stewart's 1974 album Smiler. Stewart invited Quittenton to join his group The Faces, but Quittenton was not attracted by the wild off-stage antics for which the Faces were notorious.

In 1973, Quittenton formed an instrumental band with Pete Sears, Manfred Mann drummer John Lingwood and keyboardist Max Middleton. The band never got beyond the rehearsal stage.

Suffering from mental health problems, Quittenton left the music business and moved to Llanrhyddlad, on the isle of Anglesey, Wales.
