= Martin Pugh (musician) =

British guitarist

Martin John Pugh
- Born: Martin John Pugh; England
- Genres: Rock, blues, blues rock, rock and roll, psychedelic rock, hard rock
- Instrument: Guitar
- Years active: 1968–1976, 2002–03
- Labels: Bellaphon; CBS; A&M

Martin John Pugh is a British guitarist who came to prominence after joining blues-rock band Steamhammer in 1968, staying with that band through 5 years and 4 albums. The debut Steamhammer album, also known as Steamhammer, was released in 1969 and yielded a minor hit record in Europe, "Junior's Wailing". Pugh also played on the first Rod Stewart solo album, An Old Raincoat Won't Ever Let You Down (aka The Rod Stewart Album).

Following the dissolution of Steamhammer in 1973, Pugh and Steamhammer bassist Louis Cennamo joined up with former the Yardbirds vocalist Keith Relf (who had played with Cennamo in Renaissance and had helped produce the final Steamhammer LP) and drummer Bobby Caldwell to form Armageddon in 1975. According to liner notes of a CD re-release of their only album on the Repertoire Records label in 1999, drug problems interfered with the band's work ethic - although the record had received favorable reviews and significant radio airplay upon its release. Their demise was finalized after the untimely death of Relf in May 1976.

While he appears to have retired from music after 1975, he did emerge to play guitar (alongside Geoff Thorpe of Vicious Rumors) on studio sessions in Seattle with the Hawaii-based rock and roll band, 7th Order on their debut CD, The Lake of Memory - released on the Big Island Sounds label in 2007.
