= Moments (Mark Holden album) =

Greatest hits album by Mark Holden
- Released: 1979
- Recorded: 1975–1977
- Genre: Pop, Pop rock
- Length: 37:46
- Label: EMI Music
- Producer: Peter Dawkins

Mark Holden chronology
| Encounter (1977) | Moments (1979) | Mark Holden (1983) |

Alternative cover
- 1995 re-release art work

Moments is the first greatest hits album by Australian singer songwriter Mark Holden. The album was released in 1979. It includes tracks from his first three studio albums, Dawn in Darkness, Let Me Love You and Encounter.

The album was released on CD in 1995.

== Track listing ==
Side one
| No. | Title | Writer(s) | album | Length |
|---|---|---|---|---|
| 1. | "Carry Me Down" | Mark Holden | Dawn in Darkness | 2:05 |
| 2. | "Never Gonna Fall in Love Again" | Eric Carmen | Let Me Love You | 3:17 |
| 3. | "I Wanna Make You My Lady" | Gary Osborne, Kenneth Gärdestad, Ted Gärdestad | Let Me Love You | 2:40 |
| 4. | "Last Romance" | Beeb Birtles | Let Me Love You | 2:50 |
| 5. | "Hey, My Love" | Mark Radice | non-album single | 3:05 |
| 6. | "Took My Heart to the Party" | Holden, Peter Threlfall | Encounter | 4:07 |

Side two
| No. | Title | Writer(s) | album | Length |
|---|---|---|---|---|
| 1. | "Reach Out for the One Who Loves You" | Peter Hawkins | Encounter | 2:55 |
| 2. | "Let's Go Dancing" | Joan Armatrading | Encounter | 3:26 |
| 3. | "Where Are You Girl" | Holden, Threlfall, Dominic Bugatti, Frank Musker | Encounter | 3:26 |
| 4. | "Sweet Morning Smile in Your Eyes"/"You Set My Dreams to Music" | Molly Ann Leikin, Steve Dorff | new recording | 3:34 |
| 5. | "Firefly" | Holden | Let Me Love You | 3:16 |
| 6. | "Let Me Love You Once Before You Go" | Leikin, Dorff | Let Me Love You | 2:52 |
