= So Much More =

So Much More may refer to:

- "So Much More" (song), a single released by American rapper Fat Joe from his 2005 album All or Nothing
- So Much More (Brett Dennen album), a 2006 album by American singer-songwriter Brett Dennen
- So Much More (Judith Durham album), a 2018 album by Australian Judith Durham
- "So Much More", a song by Big Sean from his 2011 album Finally Famous
