= Here Am I (Judith Durham album) =

Compilation album by Judith Durham
- Released: 27 October 1972
- Recorded: 1969–1971
- Genre: Folk, world
- Label: A&M

Judith Durham chronology
Australia's Own Judith Durham (1971)	Here Am I (1972)	Judith Durham and The Hottest Band in Town (1973)

Here Am I is the first international compilation album by Australian recording artist Judith Durham. The album contains tracks from Durham's two studio album, Gift of Song and Climb Ev'ry Mountain both on A&M Records. The album was released in October 1972.

== Track listing ==
LP/ Cassette

- A1 "I Wish I Knew" (B. Taylor/D.Dallas)
- A2 "Skyline Pigeon" (E. John/B. Taupin)
- A3 "Wailing of the Willow" (Harry Nilsson)
- A4 "I'm Old Fashioned" (J. Kerr/J.Mercer)
- A5 "Kaleidoscope" (R.McKuen)
- A6 "Here Am I" (Mason Williams)
- B1 "The Light is Dark Enough" (Maitland/Kerr)
- B2 "Do You Believe" (Da Lema/C Baldwin)
- B3 "Gift of Song" (Patti Ingalle)
- B4 "Your Heart Is Free" (Le Vent et La Jeunese) (C.Chevallier, J.Shakespeare)
- B5 "I Can Say" (David Reilly)
- B6 "Climb Ev'ry Mountain" (R. Rodgers/O. Hammerstein II)
