= Let Me Find Love =

Studio album by Judith Durham
- Released: 18 April 1994
- Genre: Easy listening, folk, world, country
- Label: EMI Records
- Producer: Michael Cristiano

Judith Durham chronology
| A Carnival of Hits (1994) | Let Me Find Love (1994) | Mona Lisas (1996) |

Judith Durham albums chronology
| 1968 BBC Farewell Spectacular (1999) | Hold On to Your Dream (2000) | Live in Concert (2002) |

Alternate cover
- Hold On to Your Dream (2000)

Let Me Find Love is the sixth studio album by Australian recording artist Judith Durham. The album was released in Australia in April 1994 and peaked at number 8 on the ARIA Charts in its second week. The album was released in the United Kingdom in October 1994. It was Durham's first studio album since Judith Durham and The Hottest Band in Town Volume 2 in 1974.

The album was re-released in December 2000, under the title Hold On to Your Dream, and with an alternate track listing.

== Track listing ==
Let Me Find Love

1. "In Your Love" (R. Edgeworth/J. Durham)
2. "No Mother Could Be Lovelier" (J. Durham)
3. "Coulda Woulda Shoulda" (J. Durham/S. Testro)
4. "Hold on to Your Dream" (J. Durham)
5. "It's Hard to Leave" (J. Durham)
6. "The Migrant (O Matanastis)" (J. Durham/A.Delonas)
7. "Let Me Find Love" (J. Durham/R. Edgeworth)
8. "When Starlight Fades" (J. Durham/H. Cock/R.Edgeworth)
9. "We Must Teach Our Children" (J. Durham/T. Perry/Chief Seattle)
10. "My Father's Last Words" (J. Durham/R. Curteis/ M. Curteis)
11. "Hold on Tight" (L. Jager)
12. "Slowly, Gently" (R. Edgeworth/J. Durham)

Hold On to Your Dream

1. "Hold On to Your Dream"
2. "Australia Land of Today"
3. "Let Me Find Love"
4. "When Starlight Fades"
5. "Coulda Woulda Shoulda"
6. "It's Hard to Leave"
7. "The Migrant (O Metanastis)"
8. "We Must Teach Our Children"
9. "Hold On Tight"
10. "No Mother Could Be Lovelier (Than You)"
11. "Slowly Gently"
12. "In Your Love" (Remix)
13. "My Father's Last Words"

== Weekly charts ==
| Chart (1994) | Peak position |
|---|---|
| Australian Albums (ARIA) | 8 |
