= It's Christmas Time (Judith Durham album) =

Studio album by Judith Durham
- Released: 8 November 2013
- Recorded: 1968, 2013
- Genre: Easy listening, Christmas music
- Label: Decca, Universal

Judith Durham chronology
The Platinum Album (2013)	It's Christmas Time (2013)	Live in London (2014)

It's Christmas Time is a 2013 Christmas album by Australian recording artist Judith Durham. The album was released in November 2013.

Tracks 5–9 and 11–16 were lifted from her 1968 album, For Christmas With Love. "It's Christmas Time" is a new composition written by Durham. It was her last studio album.

== Reception ==
Paul Barber from The Music AU gave the album 3 out of 5 saying; "Unfortunately for baby boomers Judith Durham's It's Christmas Time offers nothing particularly new this Festivus. The newer tracks here are pretty good, like "Hark The Herald Angels Sing", "O Happy Day" and the mariachi-flavoured album highlight, "Bambino". But 13 of the 17 tracks come off Durham's 1968 post-Seekers album, For Christmas With Love, although fortunately, her youthful voice smashes out these Chrissy favourites, especially a sensational version of "Amazing Grace".

== Track listing ==
1. "Hark, the Herald Angels Sing" - 2:51
2. "Bambino" - 3:41
3. "O Happy Day" - 4:33
4. "It's Christmas Time" - 2:45
5. "White Christmas" - 2:42
6. "Mary's Boy Child" - 2:54
7. "Go Tell It On a Mountain" - 1:54
8. "Lullaby For Christmas Eve" - 2:26
9. "The Lord's Prayer" - 2:11
10. "Amazing Grace" - 3:36
11. "My Faith" - 2:35
12. "Come On Children Let's Sing" - 2:08
13. "The Christmas Song (Chestnuts Roasting on an Open Fire)" - 2:27
14. "Just a Closer Walk With Thee" - 2:40
15. "Silent Night" - 2:04
16. "Joy to the World" - 1:53
17. "Somewhere a Child is Sleeping" - 4:29

== Charts ==
=== Weekly charts ===
Chart (2013)	Peak Position
Australian (ARIA) Jazz and Blues Chart	9

=== Year-end charts ===
Chart (2013)	Position
Australian Jazz and Blues Albums (ARIA)	41
