= Live in London (Judith Durham album) =

Live album by Judith Durham
- Released: 10 October 2014
- Recorded: 3 July 2003, Royal Festival Hall, London.
- Genre: Easy listening, folk, pop
- Length: 84:30
- Label: Decca Records / Universal Music Australia
- Producer: Michael Cristiano

Judith Durham chronology
It's Christmas Time (2013)	Live in London (2014)	An A Cappella Experience (2016)

Live in London is a 2014 live album by Australian recording artist Judith Durham. The album was recorded in London in 2003 to celebrate Durham's 60th birthday. The album was released on CD and digitally in October 2014.

The album reached number 16 in New Zealand in May 2016 following a tour by Durham in that country. It was Durham's first New Zealand tour in 25 years.

== Track listing ==
CD1

1. "This Is My Song" (Charlie Chaplin)
2. "Join In The Journey"
3. "You've Got a Friend" (Carole King)
4. "Let Me Find Love" (J. Durham/R. Edgeworth)
5. "No Mother Could Be Lovelier (Than You)" (Durham)
6. "50s Medley"
7. "After You've Gone" (Turner Layton, Henry Creamer)
8. "Just a Closer Walk with Thee" (trad.)
9. "Gospel Medley"
10. "Walk With Me" (Tom Springfield)
11. "Georgy Girl" (Springfield, Jim Dale)
12. "Banana Rag" (Piano Solo)
13. "Maple Leaf Rag" (Piano Solo)

CD2

1. "The Olive Tree" (Diane Lampert, Springfield)
2. "Colours of My Life"
3. "Coulda Woulda Shoulda" (Durham, S. Testro)
4. "My Father's Last Words" (J. Durham, R. Curteis, M. Curteis)
5. "I Wanna Dance to Your Music" (Durham)
6. "Body and Soul" (Edward Heyman, Robert Sour, Frank Eyton, Johnny Green)
7. "My Buddy" (Walter Donaldson, Gus Kahn)
8. "When Starlight Fades" (Durham, H. Cock, Ron Edgeworth)
9. "All Over the World" (Françoise Hardy, Julian More)
10. "When the Stars Begin to Fall"
11. "I'll Never Find Another You" (Springfield)
12. "It's Hard to Leave" (Durham)
13. "The Carnival is Over" (Springfield)

== Charts ==
=== Weekly charts ===
Chart (2014–16)	Peak position
Australian (ARIA) Jazz and Blues Chart	5
New Zealand Albums (RMNZ)	16

=== Year-end charts ===
Chart (2014)	Position
Australian Jazz and Blues Albums (ARIA)	21
