= Epiphany (Judith Durham album) =

Studio album by Judith Durham
- Released: 28 October 2011
- Recorded: 2011
- Studio: Soundplant, Melbourne
- Genre: Easy listening, folk, pop
- Label: Decca, Universal
- Producer: Michael Cristiano

Judith Durham chronology
| Up Close and Personal (2009) | Epiphany (2011) | Colours of My Life (2012) |

Epiphany is the tenth studio album (eleventh included the co-credit on Future Road) by Australian recording artist Judith Durham. The album was released in October 2011 and first to be released under Decca Records / Universal Music Australia.

In a December 2011 interview with 'Beauty and Lace' Durham said "Epiphany is an album of music and lyrics I’ve composed – some in collaboration – on inspirational topics." adding it "would appeal to people who appreciate musical theatre and songs with emotional content and inspirational concepts which have informed me and raised my awareness in the process of composing and recording the songs."

== Track listing ==
1. "Stop and Care (Hey! Hey! Hey!)" (Heather Field, Judith Durham, Robert Parde) - 3:56
2. "I Celebrate Your Life My Baby" (Rachel Stansfield Porter, Simon Barnett, Durham) - 5:03
3. "Clancy" (Banjo Paterson, Durham) - 5:23
4. "All in Good Time" (Shelley Bovey, Durham) - 2:39
5. "Phone, Love" (John Kovac, Durham) - 2:44
6. "Starting All Over Again" (featuring Mark Holden) (Mark Holden, Durham) - 3:19
7. "Let Them Leave in Peace" (Chief Seattle, Ted Perry, Durham) - 3:58
8. "So Easy to Love" (Graham Simpson, Durham) - 3:48
9. "The Hand That Rocks the World" (Diana Abruzzi, Simpson, Shelley Bovey, Durham) - 4:39
10. "André" (Frank Howson, Durham) - 3:02
11. "The Hand That Rocks the World" - Affirmation (Live) (Abruzzi, Simpson, Bovey, Durham) - 2:09

== Charts ==
=== Weekly charts ===
| Chart (2011/12) | Peak Position |
|---|---|
| Australian (ARIA) Jazz and Blues Chart | 4 |

=== Year-end charts ===
| Chart (2011) | Position |
|---|---|
| Australian Jazz and Blues Albums (ARIA) | 13 |
