= Louisville Lou (That Vampin' Lady) =

Song written by Ager & Yellen

- Sheet music, 1923

Song
- Published: 1923
- Genre: Blues
- Composer(s): Milton Ager
- Lyricist(s): Jack Yellen

Audio sample
- Recording of Louisville Lou, performed by Ruth Roye (1923): file; help

"Louisville Lou (That Vampin' Lady)" is the title of a popular song by American composer Milton Ager with lyrics by Jack Yellen. Written in 1923, it is an example of the Tin Pan Alley "vamp" style of music.

Also known and listed with ASCAP under the titles of "Stay Away From Louisville Lou" or simply "Louisville Lou", the song tells in lighthearted fashion the tale of the "scandalous vamp" Louisville Lou, "the most heart-breakin'est, shimmy shakin'est that the world ever knew."

== Song content ==
The opening lines stake the author's or singer's claims for Louisville Lou's superiority as a vamp or femme fatale: "History is full of love-makin' champs / But if you want a brand new thrill, come and meet the vamp of Louisville" while enticing the listener further about Louisville Lou's prowess - "Until you're vamped by this brunette…you ain't had no vampin' yet."

After continuing the review of her wiles and the havoc she wreaks upon innocent men ("even Deacon Jones, who is old and bent, sold his crutches just to pay her rent"), the listener is given a final warning to "stay away from Louisville Lou."

== Recorded versions ==
The song was recorded no less than nine times in the first year of its release:

- The Original Indiana Five on April 1 in Long Island City, New York for Olympic Records;
- Ladd's Black Aces on April 9 in New York, New York for Gennett and Starr;
- The Dixie Daisies again in April in New York for the Cameo label,;
- on April 24 by Arthur Gibbs and His Gang in New York for the Victor label;
- released April 30 by Margaret Young for the Brunswick label;
- in May, also in New York, by Guyon's Paradise Orchestra for Okeh;
- in June by Billy Arnold's Novelty Jazz Band, recording in Paris for Pathé;
- in August by Ted Lewis and His Band for Columbia
- and also by the Georgia Jazz Band recording in New York for the New York Federal label (recording month in 1923 unknown).

The recording by Arthur Gibbs and His Gang went to #7 on the pop charts.

Other notable recordings by Pee Wee Hunt, Sophie Tucker, Johnny Mercer on the Capitol Records label, Ted Heath, and Peggy Lee have kept the song in the public consciousness.

Peggy Lee became particularly associated with the song through her single, recorded in New York for Capitol Records in 1952, which was released again in 1960 on her album All Aglow Again!. Lee continued to sing the song in her live appearances over the years and included it in her 1983 Broadway show Peg: A Musical Autobiography.

Judith Durham recorded the song on her album, Judith Durham and The Hottest Band in Town Volume 2 (1974). Cabaret artists Julie Wilson and Joyce Moody have included the song in their nightclub acts and have also made memorable recordings of it: Wilson in 1995 in Julie Wilson (Live From the Russian Tea Room) and Moody in 2007 in her tribute (with Earl Wentz) to Milton Ager, Vampin' Lady, which takes its name from the song.
