= Live at the George Ballroom =

EP by Mark Holden
- Released: September 2005
- Recorded: 20 July 2004
- Venue: George Ballroom, St Kilda, Victoria
- Length: 79 mins
- Label: Thames/Thompson
- Producer: Drew Thompson, Em Rose, Steve Scanlon

Mark Holden chronology
A Tribute to Tex Morton (1999)	Live at the George Ballroom (2005)	The Holden Brothers Travelling Circus (2014)

Live at the George Ballroom is a live recording by Australian singer and songwriter, Mark Holden. It was recorded in July 2004 and released on DVD in September 2005. A digital extended play was released a few weeks later.

In April 2026, the EP was released in full for the first time. Paul Cashmere from Noise11 called the release "significant" as it release five years before "his 2010 thyroid cancer surgery that impacted his vocal cords".

== Track listing ==
DVD

1. Intro (including "I Wanna Make You My Lady" (from Countdown) - 1:20
2. "Never Gonna Fall in Love Again" (Eric Carmen, Sergei Rachmaninoff)- 5:00
3. "It's All in the Game" (Carl Sigman, Carl Sigman) - 2:44
4. "Honey Do's" (Holden) - 2:26
5. "Don't Give Up On Me" (Dan Penn, Carson Whitsett, Hoy Lindsey)- 3:22
6. "Starting Over Again" (Holden, Judith Durham) - 3:26
7. Football Show Piece "Yoghurt with Paul Harrigan"
8. "Shine" (Holden, Vanessa Amorosi, Robert Parde) - 4:22
9. "Lady Soul" (Holden) - 3:59
10. "Short Term Memory Loss Blues" (Bill Putt) - 4:27
11. "Dreams of Silver and Memories of Gold" (Lincoln) - 5:00
12. "Just Plain Folks" (Maurice Stonehill) - 4:09
13. "End of the Line" (Traveling Wilburys) - 3:31
14. End credits with Paul Harrigan "I Wanna Make You My Lady" via The Footy Show)
15. "Building Lady Soul" (Bonus)
16. "I Wanna Make You My Lady" (from Countdown) (Ted Gärdestad, Kenneth Gärdestad, Gary Osborne) (Bonus)
17. "Never Gonna Fall in Love Again" (Promotional Clip) (Carmen) (Bonus)
18. Interview with George Negus (Bonus)
19. Photogallery (Bonus)

2005 digital release

1. "Never Gonna Fall in Love Again" – 5:00
2. "Don't Give Up On Me" – 3:23
3. "Shine" – 4:23
4. "Short Term Memory Loss Blues" – 4:27
5. "Dreams of Silver and Memories of Gold" – 5:00

2026 digital release

1. "Never Gonna Fall in Love Again" - 5:00
2. "All in the Game" - 2:44
3. "Honey Dos" - 2:26
4. "Don't Give Up On Me" - 3:22
5. "Starting Over Again" 3:26
6. "Shine" - 4:22
7. "Lady Soul" 3:59
8. "Short Term Memory Loss Blues" - 4:27
9. "Dreams of Silver and Memories of Gold" - 5:00
10. "Just Plain Folks" - 4:09
11. "End of the Line" - 3:31

== Personnel ==
Adapted from AllMusic.

- Mark Holden – vocals, guitar
- Jeff Burstin – musical director, guitar
- Gary Young – drums
- Helen Mountford – cello
- George Butrumlis – accordion, mandolin
- Joel Turner – beat box, guitar
- Brucie Haymes – organ
- Steve Wade – backing vocals
- Gary Pinto – backing vocals
- Jo Creighton – backing vocals
- Roger Treble – guitar
- Dallas Holden – vocals
- Ross Ryan – vocals
- Mike Rudd – harp, vocals
- Bill Putt – slide, bass

== Release history ==
Date	Release format	Label	Catalogue
12 September 2005	DVD	Thompson Records	TMM178
1 October 2005	Digital Download	Thompson Records	
24 April 2026	Digital Download	Dream Dealers / MGM Distribution	D-9324690447206
