= Mark Holden (album) =

Studio album by Mark Holden
- Released: 1983
- Recorded: Los Angeles
- Genre: Pop, Pop rock
- Label: Casablanca
- Producer: Chris Brunt, Mark Holden, Peter Hamilton

Mark Holden chronology
Moments (1979)	Mark Holden (1983)	Live at the George Ballroom (2005)

Singles from Mark Holden
- 1. "For You" Released: March 1983; 2. "Who Do You Love?" Released: August 1983; 3. "Alice" Released: November 1983

Mark Holden is the fourth studio album by Australian singer-songwriter Mark Holden and first on new American label Casablanca Records.

The album was recorded in Los Angeles using session musicians. The lead single, "For You" appeared on the 1984 film, Lovelines.

The album was promoted with Holden hosting Australian music TV show Countdown on 21 August 1983.

== Track listing ==
Side one
No.	Title	Writer(s)	Length
1.	"For You"	Mark Holden, Peter Hamilton	4:14
2.	"Who Do You Love?"	Gary Pickus, Holden, Hamilton	3:38
3.	"Alice"	Holden, Hamilton, Steve LeGassick	4:14
4.	"Sittin' Pretty"	Holden, Hamilton	3:54
5.	"I'll Rock You To Sleep Tonight"	Holden, Hamilton	3:22

Side two
No.	Title	Writer(s)	Length
1.	"Exposed"	Holden, Hamilton, Phil Chen	3:26
2.	"Hey, Little Girl"	Holden, Hamilton	1:54
3.	"Who'd Be Fool Enough"	Holden, Hamilton, Chen	3:52
4.	"I'll Dance Alone"	Holden, Hamilton	3:27
5.	"Count to Ten"	Gloria Sklerov, Holden, Hamilton	3:27
