= The Platinum Album =

The Platinum Album may refer to:

- The Platinum Album (Vengaboys album)
- The Platinum Album (Judith Durham album)

== See also ==
- Platinum album
