= Basin Street Blues =

1928 song by Dixieland jazz bands

- Columbia Records 78 by the Charleston Chasers with additional lyrics by Jack Teagarden and Glenn Miller, 1931

Song
- Published: 1928 by Mayfair Music
- Songwriter: Spencer Williams

Audio sample
- First eight bars of the jazz standard "Basin Street Blues" on tenor sax: file; help

"Basin Street Blues" is a song often performed by Dixieland jazz bands, written by Spencer Williams in 1928 and recorded that year by Louis Armstrong. The verse with the lyric "Won't you come along with me / To the Mississippi..." was later added by Glenn Miller and Jack Teagarden.

The Basin Street of the title refers to the main street of Storyville, the red-light district of early 20th-century New Orleans, north of the French Quarter. It became a red light district in 1897.

== Other recordings ==
- Benny Goodman & His Orchestra with Joe Harris in 1935
- Bob Wills and his Texas Playboys with Tommy Duncan
- The Mills Brothers, first recorded in 1939 where they utilised their famous mouth trumpet/trombone trademark.
- Margie Rayburn on 1956 single "Can I Tell Them That You're Mine?"
- Shirley Bassey, on her 1957 album Born To Sing The Blues
- The Hi-Lo's on their 1957 album Suddenly It's the Hi-Lo's
- Louis Prima on his 1957 album The Wildest!
- Dave Brubeck on his 1959 album Gone with the Wind
- Ray Charles recorded this song for his 1960 record, The Genius Hits the Road.
- Ace Cannon for his debut 1962 album Tuff Sax
- Miles Davis on his 1963 album Seven Steps to Heaven
- Carol Burnett and Dinah Shore on The Carol Burnett Show in 1976.
- Sam Cooke recorded a version in 1963 with different lyrics. He performed the song live on The Tonight Show and The Mike Douglas Show.
- Oscar Peterson for his 1970 album Tracks
- Judith Durham for her 1974 album Judith Durham and The Hottest Band in Town Volume 2
- Dr. John on his 1992 album Goin’ Back to New Orleans
- Bing Crosby and Connee Boswell for Decca Records on September 25, 1937 and it charted at the No. 12 position.
- Ella Fitzgerald with the Sy Oliver Orchestra, Lullabies of Birdland
- Bing Crosby and Ella Fitzgerald sang it on his radio show
- Jo Stafford with Frankie Laine
- Julie London (About the Blues, Liberty Records)
- Liza Minnelli performed the number at her 2008-9 concert Liza's at The Palace...!
- The Curious Case of Benjamin Button
- In 2008, saxophonist David Sanborn covered the song from his album Here & Gone
- The song was re-imagined by Canadian turntablist Kid Koala by manipulating the vinyl live.
- In his live recording made at the Monterey Jazz festival in 1963, Jack Teagarden claims that the words we usually associate with the song were written by him and Glenn Miller when they were asked to arrange the song for an early Ben Pollack recording. Neither name appears on the song credits.
- Dick Stabile and his orchestra with Dean Martin
- The Brazilian band Fizz Jazz recorded in 2017.
- Cab Calloway recorded a rendition with his Orchestra. The piece was mainly instrumental with some scatting by Calloway.
- Harry Connick, Jr. on his 1988 album, 20.
- The swing revival band Big Bad Voodoo Daddy included a version of this song on their Louie Louie Louie album released in 2017.

== See also ==
- List of 1920s jazz standards
