= Hold On to Your Dream =

Hold On to Your Dream may refer to:

- "The Dream (Hold On to Your Dream)", a 1983 song by Irene Cara
- Hold On to Your Dream, a 1987 album by Steve "Silk" Hurley
- "Hold On to Your Dream", a song by Billy Thorpe from his 1982 album East of Eden's Gate
- "Hold On to Your Dream", a song by Judith Durham from her 1994 album Let Me Find Love
- "Hold On To Your Dream" (Unplugged)", a 1998 music video by Stratovarius

== See also ==
- "Hold On to Your Dreams", a song by The Twins
- Hold On to Your Dreams: Arthur Russell and the Downtown Music Scene, a 2009 biography of Arthur Russell
