= Encounter (Mark Holden album) =

Studio album by Mark Holden
- Released: September 1977
- Genre: Pop, Pop rock
- Label: EMI Music
- Producer: Richard Lush

Mark Holden chronology
Let Me Love You (1976)	Encounter (1977)	Moments (1979)

Singles from Encounter
- 1. "Reach Out for the One Who Loves You" Released: August 1977; 2. "Let's Go Dancing" Released: November 1977; 3. "First Thing in the Morning" Released: February 1978

Encounter is the third studio album by Australian singer-songwriter Mark Holden. The album was released in September 1977 and peaked at number 40 on The Australian charts where it was certified 2× gold.

== Track listing ==
Side one
No.	Title	Writer(s)	Length
1.	"Reach Out for the One Who Loves You"	P.Hawkins	2:55
2.	"Love Enough"	Moore	2:58
3.	"Sweat and the Steam"	Holden	3:41
4.	"Easy Street"	Burt, Holden, Threlfall	3:06
5.	"First Thing in the Morning"	Bias Boshell	3:40

Side two
No.	Title	Writer(s)	Length
1.	"Let's Go Dancing"	Joan Armatrading	3:22
2.	"Where Are You Girl"	Dominic Bugatti, Frank Musker	3:23
3.	"This Time Around"	Holden, Threlfall	3:45
4.	"Stay With Me"	Holden, Threlfall	3:02
5.	"Took My Heart to the Party"	Holden, Threlfall	4:04

== Charts ==
Chart (1977/78)	Peak position
Australian Albums (Kent Music Report)	40

== Certifications ==
Region	Certification	Certified units/sales
Australia (ARIA)	2× Gold	40,000^{^}
^{^} Shipments figures based on certification alone.
