= Up Close and Personal (Judith Durham album) =

- Album cover for 2016 re-release titled An A Cappella Experience

Studio album by Judith Durham
- Released: May 2009
- Genre: Easy listening, acoustic
- Label: Musicoast
- Producer: Michael Cristiano

Judith Durham chronology
The Australian Cities Suite (2008)	Up Close and Personal (2009)	Epiphany (2011)

Judith Durham albums chronology
Live in London (2014)	An A Cappella Experience (2016)	So Much More (2018)

Up Close and Personal is the ninth studio album (tenth included the co-credit on Future Road) by Australian recording artist Judith Durham. The album was released in Australia in May 2009.

== Background and release ==
In July 2006, Durham was asked to sing a short set of spiritual songs a cappella for a gathering in Sydney. Durham said; "I had certainly never thought of singing 'a cappella' in a large auditorium before. The purity of the simple presentation seemed to engender a very peaceful environment and for me the lyrics became more like prayers." Following this experience, Durham spent two years recording an a cappella album, focussing on a repertoire of spiritually focussed material.

The album was launched with a one-off concert at the Melbourne Recital Centre on 23 May 2009.

The album was re-released in November 2016 under the title An A Cappella Experience with a bonus DVD of the recital which had been recorded.

== Track listing ==
1. "I'll Never Find Another You" (Tom Springfield) - 1:56
2. "Just Do Your Best (And Leave The Rest To Him)" (Judith Durham) - 2:39
3. "His Eye Is on the Sparrow" (Charles H. Gabriel, Civilla Martin) - 3:23
4. "Calling Me Home" (Jeff Vincent, Durham) - 3:29
5. "Breathe On Me, Breath of God" (Edwin Hatch, Robert Jackson) - 4:27
6. "Nobody But You" (Springfield) - 1:39
7. "Precious Lord, Take My Hand" (George Allen, Rev. Thomas A. Dorsey) - 3:01
8. "In the Garden" (C. Austin Miles) - 3:08
9. "Make Me an Instrument of Your Peace" (Springfield) - 1:58
10. "Colours Of My Life" (David Reilly, Durham) - 2:06
11. "Oh Lord, Take Me Home" (Durham) - 4:36
12. "Land Of Peace" (Bruce Woodley, Durham) - 2:52
13. "Let Me Find Love" (Durham) - 3:07
14. "Your Time is Now" (Ken Pearlman) - 2:01
15. "I Cannot Cross This Wide Ocean" (Scott Dufault) - 2:12
16. "Speak to the Sky" (Rick Springfield) - 2:09
17. "Any Road You Choose" (Jeff Vincent, Durham) - 2:46
18. "Kumbaya" (Marvin V. Frey) - 2:29
19. "Walk With Me" (Springfield) - 2:29
20. "Walking Side By Side" (Judy Wall, Pearlman) - 1:56
21. "Anchor of My Life" (John Durrell, Durham) - 1:56
22. "There He Is" (Peter Pye) - 2:02
23. "Abide with Me" (Henry Francis Lyte) - 2:28
24. "The Lord's Prayer" (Albert Hay Malotte) - 1:31

== Weekly charts ==
Chart (2016)	Peak Position
Australian (ARIA) Jazz and Blues Chart	8

== Release history ==
Region	Date	Format	Label	Catalogue
Australia	May 2009	CD	Musicoast	
Australia	4 November 2016	CD/DVD	Decca Records	3717961
