= Judith Durham and The Hottest Band in Town =

Studio album by Judith Durham
- Released: 1974; 3 June 1974 (UK)
- Recorded: Roy Chen Studio, San Francisco; February/ March 1973
- Genre: Jazz, folk, world music
- Label: Pye Records
- Producer: Ron Edgeworth

Judith Durham chronology
Here Am I (1972)	Judith Durham and The Hottest Band in Town (1974)	Judith Durham and The Hottest Band in Town Volume 2 (1974)

Judith Durham and The Hottest Band in Town is the fourth studio album from Australian recording artist Judith Durham. The album was Durham's first released via Pye Records in June 1974.

The album was re-released on CD and for digital download in 2012.

== Reception ==
Bruce Eder from AllMusic gave the album 4 1/2 out of 5 saying; "Former The Seekers lead singer Judith Durham returned to her jazz roots with this extraordinary album of big-band blues and jazz standards, augmented by three excellent originals by the singer herself. Durham belts these numbers out like a latter-day Ethel Merman, only bigger voiced and with an excellent feel for the genre and the sound in which she's working. The album is also a dazzling showcase for the Hottest Band in Town, who display a love and familiarity with this repertory the equal of Durham's. There's not a weak moment on the album, which is a must-own for fans of big-band jazz or blues vocals."

== Track listing ==
LP/ Cassette

1. "I Wanna Dance to Your Music" (Judith Durham)
2. "Am I Blue" (Harry Akst/Grant Clarke)
3. "Gimme a Pigfoot and a Bottle of Beer" (Wesley Wilson)
4. "Body and Soul" (Edward Heyman/Robert Sour/Frank Eyton/Johnny Green)
5. "After You've Gone" (Henry Creamer/Turner Layton)
6. "Cakewalking Babies From Home" (Smith/Troy/Williams)
7. "I Wish I Could Shimmy Like My Sister Kate" (Armand Piron/Clarence Williams)
8. "Mama's Got the Blues" (Judith Durham)
9. "The World's Jazz Crazy" (Huft/Blythe/Arr. Ron Edgeworth)
10. "Can't Help Lovin' That Man of Mine" (Jerome Kern/Oscar Hammerstein II)
11. "I've Got What It Takes" (Harold Jenkins/Clarence Williams)
12. "Oh Daddy Blues" (Ed Herbert/Will Russell)
13. "Alexander's Ragtime Band" (Irving Berlin)
