= Colours of My Life =

Greatest hits album by Judith Durham
- Released: 7 November 2011
- Genre: Easy listening, folk, pop
- Label: Decca Records, Universal Music Australia

Judith Durham chronology
Epiphany (2011)	Colours of My Life (2011)	The Australian Cities Suite (2012)

Colours of My Life is a 2011 compilation album by Australian recording artist Judith Durham. The album was released in November 2011. A DVD was also included featuring an interview with Judith Durham by Peter Thompson.

In a December 2011 interview with 'Beauty and Lace' Durham said "Colours of My Life is a retrospective of all the albums I’ve recorded in 50 years. There are all styles of songs and composing, even me playing ragtime piano." adding it "would appeal to anyone who wants to share my musical journey through all the different styles."

== Track listing ==
1. "Colours of My Life"
2. "Moan You Mourners" (Bessie Smith)
3. "Georgy Girl" (Tom Springfield, Jim Dale)
4. "The Olive Tree" (Diane Lampert, Tom Springfield)
5. "Maple Leaf Rag" (Scott Joplin) (Live at The Talk of the Town)
6. "Just a Closer Walk with Thee" (trad.)
7. "The Light is Dark Enough" (Maitland, Kerr)
8. "Skyline Pigeon" (Elton John, Bernie Taupin)
9. "I Wanna Dance to Your Music" (Judith Durham)
10. "Body and Soul" (Edward Heyman, Robert Sour, Frank Eyton, Johnny Green)
11. "What'll I Do" (Irving Berlin)
12. "My Buddy" (Walter Donaldson, Gus Kahn)
13. "Australia Land of Today" (Durham)
14. "When Starlight Fades" (Durham, H. Cock, Ron Edgeworth)
15. "It's Hard to Leave" (Durham)
16. "End of the World" (Skeeter Davis)
17. "Far Shore"
18. "Fifties Medley" (made up of "You Belong To Me", "It’s Impossible" and "Wonderful! Wonderful!")
19. "The Carnival is Over" (Springfield)
20. "His Eye is on the Sparrow" (Civilla D. Martin, Charles H. Gabriel)
21. "I Celebrate Your Life My Baby" (Durham)
22. "Climb Ev'ry Mountain" (Oscar Hammerstein II, Richard Rodgers)

== Charts ==
=== Weekly charts ===
Colours of My Life debuted at number 57 and peaked at 40 the following week.

Chart (2011/12)	Peak Position
Australian (ARIA)	40
Australian (ARIA) Jazz and Blues Chart	1
Australian (ARIA) Artist Chart	8

=== Year-end charts ===
Chart (2011)	Position
Australian Jazz and Blues Albums (ARIA)	4
Australian Artist Albums (ARIA)	42
Chart (2012)	Position
Australian Jazz and Blues Albums (ARIA)	12

== Tour ==
In April 2012, Durham announced dates for the Colour of My Life tour. This was her first solo tour since 2001.

- June 30: Riverside Theatre, Perth
- July 3: Adelaide Entertainment Centre, Adelaide
- July 5: Derwent Entertainment Centre, Hobart
- July 7: Her Majesty's Theatre, Melbourne
- July 8: Her Majesty's Theatre, Melbourne
- July 11: Brisbane Convention & Exhibition Centre, Brisbane
- July 13: Concert Hall, Sydney Opera House, Sydney
- July 14: Concert Hall, Sydney Opera House, Sydney
- July 16: Royal Theatre, National Convention Centre, Canberra
