= Pretty Eyes =

Studio album by Peggy Lee
- Released: August 1960
- Recorded: February 15, 18, 19, 1960
- Studio: Capitol (Hollywood)
- Genre: Vocal jazz
- Length: 32:44
- Label: Capitol
- Producer: Dave Cavanaugh

Peggy Lee chronology
| All Aglow Again! (1960) | Pretty Eyes (1960) | Christmas Carousel (1960) |

Pretty Eyes is a 1960 studio album by Peggy Lee that was arranged by Billy May.

== Reception ==
Professional ratings
Review scores
| Source | Rating |
|---|---|
| AllMusic | 3/5 stars |

The AllMusic review by Dave Nathan awarded the album three stars and commented that "There's no brass in the orchestra, just flutes, woodwinds, and strings. The result is that the arrangements are tame compared to charts May turned out when he had trumpets and trombones to work with. On some tracks, one gets the impression that Lee got bored with some of the complacent arrangements and shows her indifference by having a bit of fun using overly broad vowel pronunciations on such tunes as "Pretty Eyes." But on the better stuff, such as the swinging "It Could Happen to You," "Too Close for Comfort," and "Fly Me to the Moon" done as a slow ballad, she holds nothing back. Although her bountiful vocal gifts are occasionally held somewhat in check, there's still enough here to satisfy Lee and vocal fans alike".

== Track listing ==
1. "As You Desire Me" (Allie Wrubel) - 2:53
2. "It Could Happen to You" (Johnny Burke, Jimmy Van Heusen) - 2:27
3. "Pretty Eyes" (J. Milton Reddie, Ona P. Welsh) - 2:37
4. "Moments Like This" (Burton Lane, Frank Loesser) - 1:57
5. "Remind Me" (Dorothy Fields, Jerome Kern) - 4:24
6. "You Fascinate Me So" (Cy Coleman) - 2:12
7. "I Wanna Be Loved" (Johnny Green, Edward Heyman, Billy Rose) - 3:05
8. "I'm Walking Through Heaven with You" (Jimmie Lunceford, Joe Turner) - 2:41
9. "I Remember You" (Johnny Mercer, Victor Schertzinger) - 2:32
10. "Too Close for Comfort" (Jerry Bock, Larry Holofcener, George David Weiss) - 2:34
11. "In Other Words" (Bart Howard) (after the album was released this song became better known as "Fly Me to the Moon") - 2:23
12. "Because I Love Him So" (Peggy Lee, Milt Raskin) - 2:59

== Personnel ==
- Peggy Lee - vocals
- Billy May - arranger, conductor
