= The Platinum Album (Judith Durham album) =

Greatest hits album by Judith Durham
- Released: 5 July 2013
- Recorded: 1963–2013
- Genres: Easy listening, folk, pop
- Length: 76:42
- Label: Decca Records / Universal Music Australia

Judith Durham chronology
The Australian Cities Suite (2012)	The Platinum Album (2013)	It's Christmas Time (2013)

The Platinum Album is a 2013 compilation album by Australian recording artist Judith Durham. The album was released on 5 July 2013.

== Background ==
Durham suffered a brain haemorrhage on May 14, 2013 after coming off stage in Melbourne with her band The Seekers, just two months short of her 70th birthday.

To celebrate her recovery, her 70th birthday and 50 years in the industry, it was announced The Platinum Album would be released, including her solo songs and hits with The Seekers.

The album includes notes by Judith herself, her biographer Graham Simpson, and the celebrated writer/musician Chris Patrick, and includes rare and vintage photographs.

== Reception ==
Mark Walker of ClassikOn reviewed the album positively, stating "Judith's voice shows little of the passage of her 70 years and is at the heart of what makes this album special." He further said "Resembling many of her post-Seekers releases, it contains a few jazzy numbers, one or two of a blues persuasion, a few covers, and two of The Seekers most popular numbers, "Morningtown Ride" and "The Carnival is Over"."

== Track listing ==
All tracks were personally selected by Judith. Many available for the first time on compact disc. The album includes two tracks that were recorded especially for the album. The tracks are in alphabetical order.

No.	Title	Artist	Length
1.	"After You've Gone"	Judith Durham	3:52
2.	"Always There"	Judith Durham	3:58
3.	"Australia's Canberra"	Judith Durham	3:21
4.	"A Bonny Face"	Judith Durham	2:20
5.	"Clancy"	Judith Durham	5:27
6.	"Forever and Ever"	Judith Durham	2:44
7.	"The Gift of Song"	Judith Durham	3:12
8.	"Gloryland"	Judith Durham & The Hottest Band in Town	2:13
9.	"He Will Remember Me"	Judith Durham & Ron Edgeworth	2:54
10.	"I Am Australian"	Judith Durham featuring Russell Hitchcock and Mandawuy Yunupingu	4:55
11.	"I Love You"	Judith Durham & The Hottest Band in Town	2:41
12.	"If You Go Away"	The Seekers featuring Judith Durham	4:03
13.	"It's Goin' to Be a Beautiful Day"	Judith Durham & The Hottest Band in Town	4:06
14.	"Jelly Bean Blues"	Judith Durham	3:39
15.	"Memories"	Judith Durham	2:35
16.	"Morningtown Ride"	The Seekers	2:41
17.	"Northern Lights"	Judith Durham	5:09
18.	"The Carnival Is Over"	The Seekers	3:06
19.	"This Is My Song"	The Seekers featuring Judith Durham	2:54
20.	"Wailing of the Willow"	Judith Durham	2:32
21.	"We Must Teach Our Children"	Judith Durham	3:12
22.	"What Could Be a Better Way"	Judith Durham	3:02
23.	"(When You Come to the End Of) A Perfect Day"	Judith Durham	1:52
Total length:			76:42

== Charts ==
The Platinum Album debuted and peaked at number 36 on the ARIA Albums Chart.

=== Weekly charts ===
Chart (2013)	Peak position
Australian Albums (ARIA)	36

=== Year-end charts ===
Chart (2013)	Position
Australian Jazz and Blues Albums (ARIA)	8
