= Latin ala Lee! =

Latin a la Lee!

Studio album by Peggy Lee
- Released: January 1960
- Recorded: August 1959
- Genre: Vocal jazz; traditional pop; Latin jazz; lounge music
- Length: 36:11
- Label: Capitol
- Producer: Dave Cavanaugh

Peggy Lee chronology
Beauty and the Beat! (1959)	Latin a la Lee! (1960)	All Aglow Again! (1960)

Professional ratings
Review scores
Source	Rating
AllMusic	3/5 stars

Latin a la Lee! is a 1960 album by Peggy Lee that was arranged by Jack Marshall.

Marvin Schwartz won the Grammy Award for Best Album Cover at the 2nd Annual Grammy Awards in 1959 for his work on Latin a la Lee!.

== Track listing ==
1. "Heart" (Richard Adler, Jerry Ross) - 1:57
2. "On the Street Where You Live" (Alan Jay Lerner, Frederick Loewe) - 2:12
3. "Till There Was You" (Meredith Willson) - 2:30
4. "I Am in Love" (Cole Porter) - 2:17
5. "Hey There" (Adler, Ross) - 2:10
6. "I Could Have Danced All Night" (Lerner, Loewe) - 2:10
7. "The Surrey With the Fringe on Top" (Oscar Hammerstein II, Richard Rodgers) - 1:59
8. "The Party's Over" (Betty Comden, Adolph Green, Jule Styne) - 3:19
9. "Dance Only with Me" (Comden, Green, Styne) - 2:29
10. "Wish You Were Here" (Harold Rome) - 2:48
11. "C'est Magnifique" (Porter) - 2:07
12. "I Enjoy Being a Girl" (Rodgers, Hammerstein) - 2:17

== Personnel ==
- Peggy Lee – vocals
- Jack Marshall – arranger, conductor, ensemble leader
