= Danny Spooner =

Danny Spooner (16 December 1936 – 3 March 2017) was an Australian traditional folk singer and social historian. Born in England, he left school at the age of 13 and worked as a salvage tug and trawler skipper before moving to Australia in 1962. He rapidly became involved in the Melbourne folk revival centred on Frank Traynor's folk club, and was a major figure in the Australian folk scene thereafter.

== Awards and honours ==
Danny Spooner was the Port Fairy Folk Festival artist of the year in 1995.

== Discography ==
=== LPs ===
- 1965: A Wench and a Whale and a Pint of Good Ale, Discurio
- 1966: Soldiers and Sailors, Discurio
- 1977: Canterbury Fair, Anthology AR 001
- 1978: Danny Spooner and Friends, Anthology AR 002
- 1978: Limbo, Anthology AR 003
- 1978: Revived and Relieved (with Gordon McIntyre), Larrikin LRF 016
- 1986: I Got This One From..., Sandstock Music SSM 017
- 1987: When a Man's in Love, Sandstock Music, SSM 021
- 1988: We'll Either Bend or Break 'Er, Sandstock Music SSM 027
- 1989: All Around Down Under, Sandstock Music SSM 036 (with Martyn Wyndham-Read)

=== CDs ===
- 2002: When a Man's in Love (love songs from a man’s point of view)
- 2002: We'll Either Bend or Break 'Er (shanties)
- 2002: Launch Out on the Deep (sea songs)
- 2016: Home
- 2017: Enchanted (live in Concert with Mike Kerin, Richard Tognetti and the Australian Chamber Orchestra)

=== Folk Trax ===
- 2004: ‘ard Tack, (traditional Australian songs of work)
- 2006: The Great Leviathan, traditional songs of whaling
- 2007: Years of Spooner, (compilation of songs Danny has sung 1965-2007)
- 2007: Emerging Tradition, (fairly) contemporary Australian songs
- 2008: Brave Bold Boys
