= Capitol Collectors Series (The Seekers album) =

Compilation album by The Seekers
- Released: 28 July 1992
- Recorded: 1962–1967
- Genre: Folk, world, country
- Length: 55:24
- Label: Capitol Records

The Seekers chronology
Ideal (1990)	Capitol Collectors Series (1992)	The Silver Jubilee Album (1993)

Capitol Collectors Series is a 1992 compilation of 23 tracks recorded by Australian band The Seekers. This release was the first time that many of these songs were available on compact disc. The CD contained studio recording, live tracks and radio jingles. The compilation was part of the Capitol Collectors Series.

== Reception ==
Professional ratings
Review scores
Source	Rating
AllMusic	4/5 stars

Greg Adams from AllMusic wrote, "The Seekers' folk-pop sound formed a bridge between The Kingston Trio and The Association, putting the Australian quartet in the same international quasi-folk neighborhood as The Sandpipers and Peter and Gordon. "Georgy Girl" and "I'll Never Find Another You" were the group's two big hits, but their repertoire included everything from traditional folk songs and spirituals to pure pop. With strummy acoustic guitars and intricate vocal arrangements, the Seekers paved the way for the folk-oriented pop vocal groups that followed. Capitol Collectors Series is a 23-track anthology that presents their hits and more, with several excellent tracks among the obscurities."

== Track listing ==
1. "I'll Never Find Another You" - 2:41
2. "Open Up Them Pearly Gates" - 2:13
3. "This Little Light of Mine" - 2:14
4. "A World Of Our Own" - 2:57
5. "Sinner Man" - 2:25
6. "The Carnival Is Over" - 3:15
7. "We Shall Not Be Moved" - 2:39
8. "Someday, One Day" - 2:33
9. "Walk With Me" - 3:12
10. "Georgy Girl" - 2:19
11. "Morningtown Ride" - 2:37
12. "Come The Day" - 2:11
13. "On The Other Side" - 2:11
14. "I Wish You Could Be Here" - 2:14
15. "When Will The Good Apples Fall (On The Other Side Of My Fence) - 2:36
16. "Cloudy" - 2:15
17. "Rattler" - 2:48
18. "All Over the World" - 2:37
19. "Emerald City" - 2:40
20. "Love Is Kind, Love Is Wine" - 2:36
21. "All I Can Remember" - 1:54
22. "Island Of Dreams" - 2:27
23. "Red Rubber Ball" - 2:27
24. The Seekers radio commercial for Coca-Cola - 1:31
