= 25 Year Reunion Celebration =

Live album by Judith Durham and The Seekers
- Released: 29 November 1993
- Recorded: Sunday, 22 August 1993 Melbourne Concert Hall
- Genre: Folk music, Swing music
- Length: 66:09
- Label: EMI Music

Judith Durham and The Seekers chronology
The Silver Jubilee Album (1993)	25 Year Reunion Celebration (1993)	A Carnival of Hits (1994)

Alternative cover
- 2016 re-release

25 Year Reunion Celebration is a live album credited to Judith Durham and The Seekers. It celebrates the 25th anniversary of the band's final performance in 1968. The concert was recorded at the Melbourne Concert Hall and released on 29 November 1993 and peaked at number 9 on the ARIA Charts in January 1994. The success led to a sell-out UK tour across 1994 and 1995 at London's 'Royal Albert Hall' and 'Wembley Arena'.

The album was released in Europe in 1995 and in the US in 1999. The album was re-released in Australia with Decca Records on CD, DVD and Digitally in March 2016.

== Track listing ==
1. "When the Stars Begin to Fall" (Athol Guy, Keith Potger, Bruce Woodley) - 3:50
2. "With the Swag All on My Shoulder" - 2:28
3. "Plaisir d'amour" (Jean-Paul-Égide Martini, Jean-Pierre Claris de Florian) - 3:22
4. "Morningtown Ride" (Malvina Reynolds) - 3:58
5. "You're My Spirit" (Athol Guy, Keith Potger) - 2:43
6. "Kumbaya" (Athol Guy, Keith Potger, Bruce Woodley) - 3:31
7. "Gospel Medley": This Little Light of Mine/Open Up Them Pearly Gates/We Shall Not Be Moved - 4:11
8. "Come the Day" (Bruce Woodley) - 3:09
9. "One World Love" (Judith Durham, John Young) - 3:12
10. "When Will the Good Applies Fall" (Kenny Young) - 3:26
11. "Devoted to You" (Boudleaux Bryant) - 2:31
12. "Colours of My Life" (Judith Durham, David Reilly) - 2:43
13. "Time and Again" (Bruce Woodley) - 3:28
14. "Red Rubber Ball" (Paul Simon, Bruce Woodley) - 2:49
15. "I Am Australian" (Dobe Newton, Bruce Woodley) - 4:41
16. "I'll Never Find Another You" (Tom Springfield) - 3:04
17. "Georgy Girl" (Jim Dale, Tom Springfield) - 2:26
18. "A World of Our Own" (Tom Springfield) - 2:54
19. "The Carnival Is Over" (Tom Springfield) - 3:52
20. "Keep a Dream in Your Pocket" (Bruce Woodley) - 3:51

== Charts ==
Chart (1993–95)	Peak position
Australian Albums (ARIA)	9
New Zealand Albums (RMNZ)	22
UK Albums (OCC)	93

== Certification ==
Region	Certification	Certified units/sales
Australia (ARIA)	Platinum	70,000^{^}
^{^} Shipments figures based on certification alone.
