= The Australian Cities Suite =

- Album cover from 2012 re-release

Studio album by Judith Durham
- Released: October 2008
- Recorded: ABC Iwaki Auditorium, Melbourne,
- Genre: Easy listening, folk
- Label: Musicoat, Decca, Universal
- Producer: Michael Cristiano

Judith Durham chronology
Live in Concert (2002)	The Australian Cities Suite (2008)	Up Close and Personal (2009)

Judith Durham albums chronology
Colours of My Life (2011)	The Australian Cities Suite (2012)	The Platinum Album (2013)

The Australian Cities Suite is an album by Australian recording artist Judith Durham with Orchestra Victoria. The album is a collection of songs she wrote about each capital city in Australia and was released in October 2008.

The album was re-released on 27 April 2012 and peaked at number 81 on the ARIA Chart in May 2012.

== Background and release ==
In 2006, the Seekers were given the "Key to the City" of Melbourne. where Durham sang her song "Seldom Melbourne Leaves My Mind" as part of her speech in tribute to her home town. Durham accepted an invitation by Orchestra Victoria to record an album that would be titled The Australian Cities Suite with all royalties benefiting 400 charities. The album was released in October 2008.

== Track listing ==
1. "Judith Durham's Advance Australia Fair - Opening Chorus" - 1:21
2. "Overture" - 3:41
3. "Australia Land Of Today" - 3:01
4. "Seldom Melbourne Leaves My Mind" - 3:49
5. "Meet Me in the Mall in Brisbane" - 2:15
6. "Australia's Canberra" - 3:20
7. "Happy Years I Spent in Hobart" - 3:14
8. "Darwin is Da Winner" - 2:40
9. "Adelaide You're Beautiful" - 3:30
10. "When Perth is on the East Side" - 2:07
11. "Sydney, Girl of My Dreams" - 3:01
12. "Our Town" - 2:37
13. "Advance Australia Fair" 2012 re-release only - 3:30
14. "Australia Land of Today" - 1:45

== Charts ==
=== Weekly charts ===
Chart (2012)	Peak position
Australian Albums (ARIA)	81
Australian (ARIA) Jazz and Blues Chart	1
Australian (ARIA) artist Chart	19

=== Year-end charts ===
Chart (2012)	Position
Australian Jazz and Blues Albums (ARIA)	12

== Release history ==
Region	Date	Format	Label	Catalogue
Australia	October 2008	Compact Disc	Musicoat	
Australia	27 April 2012	Digital download, CD	Decca Records	2797918
