= A Carnival of Hits =

Compilation album by Judith Durham and The Seekers
- Released: April 1994 GBR
- Genre: Folk, pop
- Label: EMI Music

Judith Durham albums chronology
25 Year Reunion Celebration (1994)	A Carnival of Hits (1994)	Let Me Find Love (1994)

The Seekers chronology
25 Year Reunion Celebration (1994)	A Carnival of Hits (1994)	This Is The Seekers (1994)

A Carnival of Hits is a compilation album credited to Judith Durham and the Seekers. It was released in the United Kingdom in April 1994 to coincide with the Seekers reunion tour.

== Track listing ==
CD (EMI – 724382915126)

1. "Morningtown Ride" – 2:40
2. "A World of Our Own" – 2:41
3. "Island of Dreams" – 2:24
4. "Red Rubber Ball" – 2:12
5. "Colours of My Life" – 2:32
6. "Georgy Girl" – 2:15
7. "This Land Is Our Land" – 2:35
8. "The Carnival is Over" – 3:14
9. "When Will the Good Apples Fall" – 2:35
10. "Someday One Day" – 2:33
11. "Kumbaya" – 2:31
12. "The 59th Street Bridge Song (Feelin' Groovy)" – 2:15
13. "Walk with Me" – 3:13
14. "The Leaving of Liverpool" – 2:53
15. "I'll Never Find Another You" – 2:42
16. "This Little Light of Mine" – 2:14
17. "The Times They are A-Changin'" – 2:34
18. "We Shall Not Be Moved" – 2:22
19. "One World Love" – 3:09
20. "Keep a Dream in Your Pocket" – 3:17

== Charts ==
Chart (1994)	Peak position
UK Albums (OCC)	7
