= All Aglow Again! =

All Aglow Again

Compilation album by Peggy Lee
- Released: January 1960
- Recorded: August 1959
- Genre: Traditional pop
- Length: 36:11
- Label: Capitol
- Producer: Dave Cavanaugh

Peggy Lee chronology
Latin ala Lee! (1960)	All Aglow Again (1960)	Pretty Eyes (1960)

Professional ratings
Review scores
Source	Rating
AllMusic	3.5/5 stars

All Aglow Again! is a 1960 compilation album by Peggy Lee, arranged by Jack Marshall.

== Track listing ==
1. "Fever" (Eddie Cooley, John Davenport)
2. "Where Do I Go from Here?" (Jerry Bock, Sheldon Harnick)
3. "Whee Baby" (Alice Larson, Peggy Lee)
4. "My Man" (Jacques Charles, Channing Pollock, Albert Willemetz, Maurice Yvain)
5. "You Deserve" (Kenny Jacobson, Rhoda Roberts)
6. "Mañana (Is Soon Enough for Me)" (Dave Barbour, Lee)
7. "Hallelujah, I Love Him So" (Ray Charles)
8. "You Don't Know" (Walter Spriggs)
9. "Louisville Lou" (Milton Ager, Jack Yellen)
10. "I'm Lookin' Out the Window" (Traditional)
11. "It Keeps You Young" (Larry Coleman)
12. "Let's Call It a Day" (Ray Henderson, Lew Brown)

== Personnel ==
- Peggy Lee - vocals
