= Mark Radice =

American musician

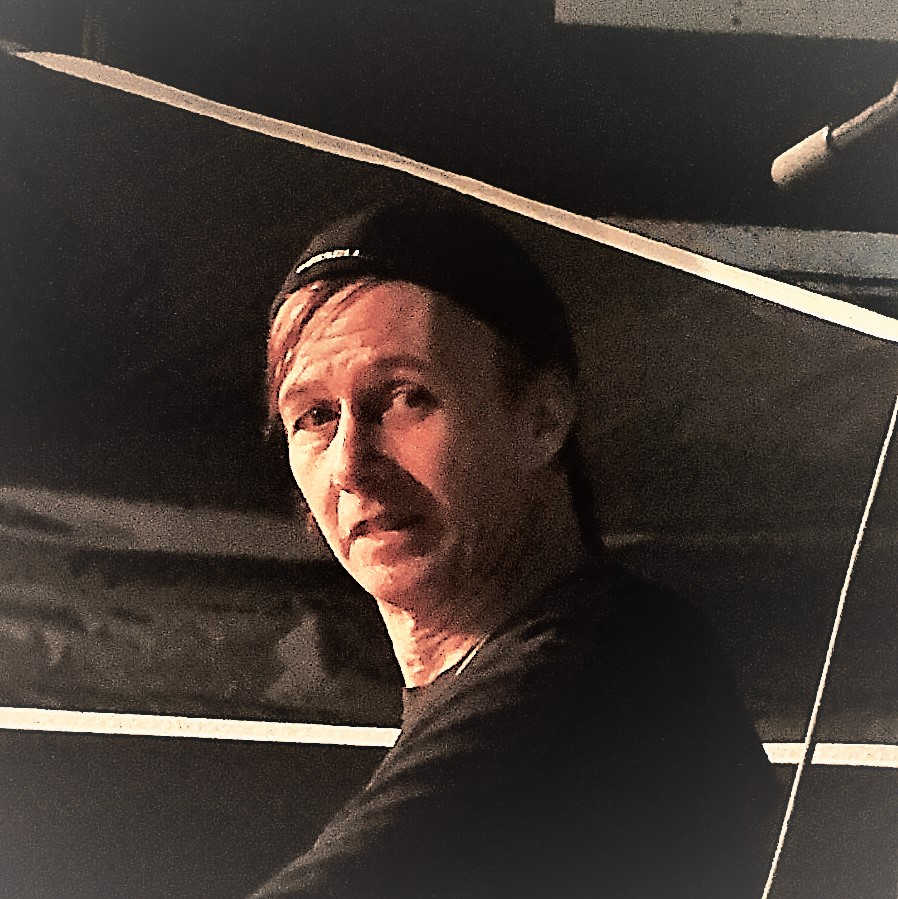

Background information
- Born: November 23, 1957 (age 68); Newark, New Jersey, United States
- Occupations: Musician, songwriter, producer
- Instruments: Keyboards, guitar, vocals
- Years active: 1964–present
- Labels: RCA, Decca, Paramount, United Artists
- Website: markradice.150m.com

Mark Radice (born November 23, 1957) is an American singer, musician, songwriter, and producer. Since the early 1970s he has worked with a variety of different artists while also achieving success with his own material. He is a multi-instrumentalist and is credited with writing more than 5,500 songs.

== Early life ==
Mark Radice was born in Newark, New Jersey in 1957, and from 1968 to 1982 he lived in nearby Nutley, where he was inducted into the Nutley Hall of Fame in 2019. His father Gene Radice was a well-known recording engineer who worked with Jimi Hendrix, Velvet Underground, Lovin' Spoonful, Janis Ian, the Four Seasons, Cowsills, Mamas & the Papas, The Tokens, Vanilla Fudge, and many more. Mark Radice began writing songs, after teaching himself guitar while listening to Beatles albums, at the age of seven.

== Career ==
In 1964, at age of seven, Radice was signed to RCA Records. His single "Natural Morning" was later covered by Frankie Valli. In 1967 while signed to Decca Records he released "10,000 Year Old Blues", which featured the 20-year-old Steven Tyler. His first full-length self-titled LP was released in 1971 on Paramount Records. The song "Hey, My Love" was later covered by Dion and Mark Holden.

In 1973 Radice was invited by Donovan to move to England, where he would contribute to Donovan's album 7-Tease album and the associated tour. In 1976, Radice released his second solo album Ain't Nothin' But A Party, featuring Brass Construction. The album included the hit single "If You Can't Beat 'Em Join 'Em."

As a writer for EMI Publishing in the 1970s, he collaborated with artists such as Michael Bolton, Eddie Money, Dave Edmunds, Barbra Streisand, Barry Manilow, Johnny Mathis, Helix, Cheap Trick, Aldo Nova, Deodato, Phyllis Hyman, Jetboy, Box of Frogs, Gene Simmons, Shark Island, Jennifer Rush, and The Muppets. In a chance encounter in a Los Angeles hotel lobby, Radice ran into Steven Tyler who asked him to tour with Aerosmith on keyboards and backing vocals. Radice appeared on Aerosmith's 1978 live album Live! Bootleg. In the mid-1980s Radice toured with Cheap Trick and appeared on their album Standing on the Edge. In the 1990s he toured with blues musician Matt "Guitar" Murphy.

Radice was introduced to Jim Henson by Phil Ramone and wrote 50-plus songs for The Muppets franchise over eight years, including for the film Elmo's Christmas Countdown. From 2005 to 2011 Radice wrote 160 songs for Sesame Street, including rearranging the original theme in 2008. Radice was nominated for three Emmy Awards for his work on Sesame Street.

In 2012 he moved to Tennessee where he became involved with the Children's Media Studio and wrote 27 songs, one for each letter of the alphabet plus a "new" alphabet song, for the Sing and Spell Learning Letters project. In 2019, that project became an animated television show currently showing regionally in various test areas. Radice has also been employed DigiTrax Entertainment in Knoxville since 2013. In 2016 Radice released the limited-edition Audio Quicksand compilation spanning his songwriting career.

== Solo discography ==
=== Albums ===
- Mark Radice (1971)
- Ain't Nothin' but a Party (1976)
- Intense (1977)
- Store in a Cool Dry Place (1993)
- Generation Why (2004)
- Stay Tuned (2007)
- Generation Why (2008)
- Sing and Spell Learning Letters (2013)
- Audio Quicksand (2016)

=== Singles ===
- "Natural morning" / "You Took the Words Right Out of My Mouth" (1968)
- "10,000 Year Old Blues" / "Three Cheers (for the Sad Man)" (1968)
- "Richest Man in the World" / "Girl by the Meter" (1969)
- "Save Your Money" / "Wooden Girl" (1972)
- "Your Love is Like Fire" / "Hey My Love" (1972)
- "Hey My Love" / "Your Love is Like Fire" (1972)
- "New Day" / "Take Me to the Park" (1972)
- "If You Can't Beat 'em, Join 'em" / "The Whole Wide World Ain't Nothin' But a Party" (1976)
- "The Answer is You" / "Monkey See Monkey Do" (1976)
- "It's You My Love" / "Love is Free" (1977) United Artists 5C 006-60377
