= Frank Traynor =

- Born: Thomas Francis Traynor; 8 August 1927; Melbourne, Victoria, Australia
- Died: 22 February 1985 (aged 57) Melbourne, Victoria, Australia
- Genre: Jazz
- Occupations: Musician, entrepreneur
- Instrument: Trombone
- Years active: 1949–1985

Frank Traynor (8 August 1927 – 22 February 1985) was an Australian jazz musician, trombonist and entrepreneur based in Melbourne. He led Australia’s longest continuously running jazz band, the Jazz Preachers, from 1956 until his death in 1985. He founded the Melbourne Jazz Club in 1958. He founded and ran Frank Traynor's Folk and Jazz Club (1963–75), which played a central role in the Australian folk revival. The club featured performers including Martyn Wyndham-Read, Danny Spooner, Brian Mooney, David Lumsden, Trevor Lucas and Margret RoadKnight.

Traynor formed his first band, the Black Bottom Stompers, in 1949. In 1951 he joined the Len Barnard Band and that same year was voted best trombonist in the "Make Way for the Bands" poll. He also made his first recordings with this band. He and his band were also a regular feature at Athol's Abbey, an underground bar and grill on the corner of St Kilda Road and Park Street (known now as the "Domain" beneath the late Domain Hotel, now a commercial complex during the 1970s. In 1963, Traynor recorded an EP with Judith Durham titled, Judy Durham. Frank and the Jazz Preachers were also a prominent feature of the Melbourne City Council's FEIP program – Free Entertainment in the Parks lunchtime activities during the '70s under the MC of Mr Robert King Crawford, with sound (amplification provided by H. C. McLean and Son Public Address.

In 1972, Traynor was part of the Fable Singers recording session, which saw the theme songs for the 12 then-VFL clubs recorded under the musical direction of channel 7's Ivan Hutchinson, alongside other Australian jazz musicians such as Smacka Fitzgibbon. Most of these recordings are still played at AFL matches today; Traynor's trombone playing can be prominently heard at the start of the Carlton football club song "We Are the Navy Blues".

Another regular venue during this period was the Dick Whittington Tavern in Hotham Street, St Kilda, on a Saturday afternoon. Frank Traynor was diagnosed with leukaemia and died in 1985. He was survived by his wife and their daughter, and two sons from a previous marriage.
