= The Silver Jubilee Album =

Greatest hits album by Judith Durham and The Seekers
- Released: 29 March 1993
- Recorded: 1964–1968, 1992
- Genre: Folk music, folk-rock, pop
- Label: EMI Music Australia
- Producer: Cyril Ornadel, Tom Springfield

Judith Durham albums chronology
| The Hot Jazz Duo (1979) | The Silver Jubilee Album (1993) | 25 Year Reunion Celebration (1993) |

The Seekers chronology
| Capitol Collectors Series (1992) | The Silver Jubilee Album (1993) | 25 Year Reunion Celebration (1993) |

The Silver Jubilee Album is a compilation album credited to Judith Durham and The Seekers. It celebrates the 25th anniversary of the band's final performance in 1968. "Keep A Dream In Your Pocket" and "One World Love" are new tracks recorded in December 1992. All other tracks were recorded between 1964 and 1968.

== Track listing ==
1. "I'll Never Find Another You" (Tom Springfield) – 2:48
2. "A World of Our Own" (Tom Springfield) – 2:40
3. "We Shall Not Be Moved" (trad.) – 2:46
4. "When the Stars Begin to Fall" (Athol Guy / Keith Potger / Bruce Woodley) – 3:07
5. "Someday One Day" – 2:32
6. "Colours of My Life" (Judith Durham / David Reilly) – 2:39
7. "Red Rubber Ball" (Paul Simon / Bruce Woodley) – 2:48
8. "Walk with Me" (Tom Springfield) – 3:00
9. "Kumbaya" (Athol Guy / Keith Potger / Bruce Woodley) – 2:34
10. "Island of Dreams" (Tom Springfield) – 2:27
11. "The Times They Are a-Changin'" (Bob Dylan) – 2:24
12. "Morningtown Ride" (Malvina Reynolds) – 2:39
13. "This Land Is Your Land" (Woody Guthrie) – 2:42
14. "This Little Light of Mine" (Avis Burgeon Christiansen, Harry Dixon Loes) – 2:15
15. "Keep a Dream in Your Pocket" (Bruce Woodley) – 3:16
16. "One World Love" (Judith Durham) – 3:09
17. "Love Is Kind, Love Is Wine" – 2:25
18. "Georgy Girl" (Jim Dale / Tom Springfield) – 2:19
19. "On the Other Side" (Tom Springfield, Gary Osbourne, Bob Sage) – 2:11
20. "When Will the Good Applies Fall" (Kenny Young) – 2:25
21. "Emerald City" (Keith Potger, Kim Fowley) – 2:37
22. "All I Can Remember" (Keith Potger) – 2:00
23. "Myra" – 1:57
24. "Isa Lei (Fijian Farewell)" (Caten) – 3:41
25. "The Carnival Is Over" (Tom Springfield) – 3:09

== Charts ==
=== Weekly charts ===
| Chart (1993) | Peak position |
|---|---|
| Australian Albums (ARIA) | 3 |
| New Zealand Albums (RMNZ) | 3 |

=== Year-end charts ===
| Chart (1993) | Position |
|---|---|
| Australian Albums (ARIA) | 21 |
| Australian Artists Albums (ARIA) | 3 |
| New Zealand Albums (RMNZ) | 35 |

== Certifications ==
| Region | Certification | Certified units/sales |
|---|---|---|
| Australia (ARIA) | Platinum | 70,000^{^} |
| New Zealand (RMNZ) | Gold | 7,500^{^} |
^{^} Shipments figures based on certification alone.
