= Mona Lisas =

1996 album by Judith Durham

Studio album by Judith Durham
- Released: March 1996 (U.K.)
- Recorded: Abbey Road Studios
- Genre: Easy listening, folk, world, country
- Label: EMI Records
- Producer: Gus Dudgeon

Judith Durham chronology
Let Me Find Love (1994)	Mona Lisas (1996)	Future Road (1997)

Australian re-release
- Always There cover

Mona Lisas is the seventh studio album by Australian recording artist Judith Durham. The album consists of mainly 1960s and 1970s covers. It was released in the United Kingdom in March 1996 and debuted and peaked at 46. The album was released in Australia on 16 September 1996 in its original form before being repackaged in September 1997 under the title Always There and included a slightly altered track listing, including the ARIA top twenty single, "I Am Australian".

== Track listing ==
Mona Lisas track listing

1. "Catch the Wind" (Donovan) - 3:12
2. "Love Song" (Lesley Duncan) - 4:34
3. "Someone Out There" (Charlie Dore and Barbara Dickson) - 3:57
4. "Heart On My Sleeve" (Gallagher and Lyle) - 3:27
5. "Turn, Turn, Turn (To Everything There is a Season)" (Traditional and Pete Seeger) - 3:52
6. "Adios Amor" (Tom Springfield and Norman Newell) - 2:44
7. "Saltwater"(Julian Lennon, Mark Spiro and Leslie Spiro) - 3:43
8. "Northern Lights" (Betty Thatcher and Michael Dunford) - 5:07
9. "Put a Little Love in Your Heart" (Jimmy Holiday, Jackie DeShannon and Randy Myers) - 3:01
10. "Morning Has Broken" (Traditional, Eleanor Farjeon Music Arranged Ian Lynn) - 4:52
11. "Mona Lisas and Mad Hatters" (Elton John and Bernie Taupin) - 5:10
12. "You've Got a Friend" (Carole King) - 4:36
13. "End of the World" (Sylvia Dee and Arthur Kent) - 4:05

Always There track listing

1. "Always There" (Terry McArthur, John Kane and Genni Kane)
2. "Catch the Wind"
3. "Love Song"
4. "Someone Out There"
5. "Northern Lights"
6. "Adios Amor"
7. "Morning Has Broken"
8. "Put a Little Love in Your Heart"
9. "Saltwater"
10. "Mona Lisas and Mad Hatters"
11. "You've Got a Friend"
12. "I Am Australian" (Bruce Woodley) (with Russell Hitchcock & Mandawuy Yunupingu)
13. "End of the World"

== Charts ==
Chart (1996)	Peak position
UK Albums (OCC)	46
