= The Hot Jazz Duo =

Live album by Ron Edgeworth and Judith Durham
- Released: 11 April 1979
- Recorded: ABC Odeon Theatre, Hobart, Australia, 30 March 1978; Newport Jazz Festival, Newport, USA, 25 June 1978
- Genre: Jazz music, Swing music
- Length: 35:17
- Label: Goodyear, Columbia Records, EMI Music
- Producer: Ron Edgeworth and Judith Durham

Judith Durham albums chronology
Judith Durham and The Hottest Band in Town Volume 2 (1974)	The Hot Jazz Duo (1979)	The Silver Jubilee Album (1993)

The Hot Jazz Duo is a live album by pianist Ron Edgeworth and vocalist Judith Durham. The album was recorded in Hobart and Newport in March and June 1978 and released in April 1979.

The album was re-released on CD in 2003.

== Background ==
Durham and Edgeworth began performing jazz covers as The Hot Jazz Duo in 1976 and over the next few years, the duo performed across USA, UK and Australia. Steve Flemming said, "Durham and Edgeworth are not, thank god, traditional jazz purists.. but they are purists just the same, pure here meaning clean, clear and unembellished. Ron's piano always interesting often amazing in its fullest and Judy's voice sparkly and brassy."

== Track listing ==
LP/ Cassette

- A1 "My Buddy" (Walter Donaldson, Gus Kahn) - 4:49
- A2 "Nobody Knows You When You're Down and Out" (Jimmy Cox) - 4:01
- A3 "Open Up Them Pearly Gates" (traditional) - 1:55
- A4 "A Good Man is Hard to Find" - 3:13
- A5 "Body and Soul" (Edward Heyman, Robert Sour, Frank Eyton, Johnny Green) - 5:27
- B1 "Just a Closer Walk with Thee" (traditional) - 4:47
- B2 "Ain't Misbehavin''" (Andy Razaf, Fats Waller, Harry Brooks) - 3:02
- B3 "Mood Indigo" (Duke Ellington, Barney Bigard, Irving Mills) - 5:07
- B4 "He Will Remember Me" - 2:57
