= Live in Concert (Melbourne Welsh Male Choir album) =

Live album by Melbourne Welsh Male Choir with Judith Durham
- Released: September 2002
- Recorded: Melbourne Concert Hall, 3 March 2002
- Genre: Easy listening, folk, pop

Judith Durham albums chronology
| Hold On to Your Dream (2000) | Live in Concert (2002) | The Australian Cities Suite (2008) |

Live in Concert is a live album credited to Melbourne Welsh Male Choir with Judith Durham. The album was recorded in Melbourne Concert Hall in March 2002 under the direction of Doug Heywood with a 70-man Melbourne Welsh Choir and the 50-piece Camerata symphony orchestra. Excerpts of the concert were released on CD in September 2002.

== Track listing ==
1. "Fantasia On Welsh Airs: "The Bells of Aberdovery" (Trad.); "Forth to Battle" (Rhuddian); "The Gentle Dove" (Trad.); "March of the Men of Harlech" (Trad.)
2. "Blaenwern" (Welsh Hymn)
3. "This Is My Song" (Charles Chaplin)
4. "Suo Gân" (Trad. Welsh lullaby)
5. "Seventeen Come Sunday" (Vaughan Williams)
6. "When Starlight Fades" (Judith Durham, Hazel Cock, Ron Edgeworth)
7. "Let Me Find Love" (Judith Durham, Ron Edgeworth)
8. "Gwahoddiad" (Trad.)
9. "Llanfair" (Trad.)
10. "It's Hard to Leave" (Judith Durham)
11. "Deus Salutis"(Trad.)
12. "Folk Songs From Somerset"(Vaughan Williams)
13. "Wales You're a Dreamland" (Judith Durham)
14. "My Father's Last Words" (Judith Durham, Ronald Curteis, Marie Curteis)
15. "Australia Land of Today" (Judith Durham)
16. "I Still Call Australia Home" (Peter Allen)
17. "Hen Wlad Fy Nhadau" (Welsh National Anthem) (Trad.)
