= For Christmas with Love =

Studio album by Judith Durham
- Released: 10 November 1968
- Recorded: October 1968
- Studio: Capitol Records, Hollywood, California
- Genre: Easy listening, Christmas music
- Label: Goodyear, Columbia Records, EMI Music
- Producer: Bill Miller

Judith Durham chronology
Judy Durham (1963)	For Christmas with Love (1968)	Gift of Song (1970)

Alternative cover
- 2002 re-release

For Christmas with Love is a 1968 Christmas album by Australian recording artist Judith Durham. It was her first solo studio album after leaving the Seekers in July 1968. The album was recorded in Hollywood and Judith subsequently headlined her own concert tours across New Zealand and Australia.

The album was re-released on CD in 2002.

== Track listing ==
LP/ Cassette

1. "White Christmas" – 2:42
2. "Mary's Boy Child" – 2:54
3. "Go Tell It on a Mountain" – 1:54
4. "Lullaby for Christmas Eve" – 2:26
5. "The Lord's Prayer" – 2:11
6. "My Faith" – 2:35
7. "Come On Children Let's Sing" – 2:08
8. "The Christmas Song (Chestnuts Roasting on an Open Fire)" – 2:27
9. "Silent Night" – 2:04
10. "Joy to the World" – 1:53
