= Climb Ev'ry Mountain (album) =

Studio album by Judith Durham
- Released: 1 February 1971
- Studio: Abbey Road Studios, London
- Genre: Folk, world, country
- Label: A&M
- Producer: Ron Richards, Judith Durham, Richard Clements, Ron Edgeworth

Judith Durham chronology
Gift of Song (1970)	Climb Ev'ry Mountain (1971)	Australia's Own Judith Durham (1971)

Climb Ev'ry Mountain is the third studio album released in 1971 by Australian recording artist Judith Durham. The album produced one single, "Climb Ev'ry Mountain"/"What Could Be a Better Way", which was released in April 1971.

The album was re-released on CD and digitally in 2015. It debuted on the ARIA Albums Chart at number 44.

== Track listing ==
1. "Do You Believe" (D. Lema, C. Balwin) – 3:10
2. "There He Is" (Peter Pye) – 3:05
3. "Kaleidoscope" (Rod McKuen) – 2:30
4. "Mama Packed a Picnic Tea" (Peter Warne, David Matthews) – 3:45
5. "Your Heart is Free" (Christian Chevallier, Joan Shakespeare) – 2:45
6. "I'm Old Fashioned" (Jerome Kern, Johnny Mercer) – 2:30
7. "What Could Be a Better Way?" (Judith Durham, Ron Edgeworth) – 3:01
8. "Skyline Pigeon" (Elton John, Bernie Taupin) – 3:27
9. "The Ones Who Really Care" (Barbara Keith) – 3:24
10. "It Doesn't Cost Very Much" (Thomas A. Dorsey) – 2:34
11. "Ferris Wheel" (Barbara Keith) – 1:58
12. "Climb Ev'ry Mountain" (Richard Rodgers, Oscar Hammerstein II) – 3:26

== Charts ==
The album's original Go-Set chart position is unknown. Climb Ev'ry Mountain debuted at number 44 in 2015 after the album was re-released on Decca Records.

Chart (2015)	Peak Position
Australian Albums (ARIA)	44
Australian Artist Albums (ARIA)	13
