= The Troubadour, Melbourne =

Former music venue in Melbourne, Australia

The Troubadour
- Address: Bowen Crescent, St Kilda; 386-388 Brunswick Street, Fitzroy 3056 Australia
- Opened: August 1978
- Closed: March 1990

The Troubadour was a music venue in Melbourne, Australia, which operated from 1978 to 1990. It featured performances by folk, blues and country musicians.

== History ==
The Troubadour was opened by Andrew Pattison in August 1978 as a sixty-two seat coffee house on Bowen Crescent, St Kilda. The name was borrowed from similar music venues such as The Troubadour in London and the Troubadour in Los Angeles. Four years later it relocated to a larger location on Brunswick Street, Fitzroy which could seat over 100 people. The new venue was BYOB (bring your own bottle), and billed itself as a restaurant-music venue, with Patrick Hayes of The Herald writing their menu was limited, but better than most theatre-restaurants. Pattison sold the business to radio presenter Ray Mow, who took over in February 1988.

After closing for three months of refurbishments, on 22 March 1989 a large fire in the kitchen caused extensive damage to the venue and it was forced to close. Mow estimated the fire's damage meant the venue would be closed a further three months and costing $70–80,0000 on top of lost revenue. The venue officially closed in March 1990 after financial difficulties due to the fire, with several musicians who had performed at the venue returning for The Troubadour's final week. These included Joe Dolce, Rank Strangers, Rod Quantock, Mike Rudd, Bob Sedergreen, and Venetta Fields.

In 1998 The Troubadour's 20th anniversary was celebrated by previous performers and fans, hosted by Pattison in The Troubadour's former home at 388 Brunswick Street. Pattison later reused the Troubadour name for a Troubadour Wine Bar beginning at 1992's Port Fairy Folk Festival, and later as the Troubadour Weekend folk festival. The Troubadour archive is held by Australian Performing Arts Collection as part of the Raymond Mow collection.
