= Gift of Song =

Studio album by Judith Durham
- Released: 15 February 1970
- Studios: Western Recorders, Hollywood, California
- Genres: Folk, Pop, Gospel, Baroque Pop
- Label: A&M
- Producer: Chad Stuart

Judith Durham chronology
For Christmas with Love (1968)	Gift of Song (1970)	Climb Ev’ry Mountain (1971)

Alternative cover
- Australian 1973 re-release

Gift of Song is the second studio album released in 1970 by Australian recording artist Judith Durham.

The album was re-released in 1973 and again on CD and digitally in 2012.

The album produced the singles, "The Light Is Dark Enough"/"Wanderlove" which was released in January 1970 and "Take Care of My Brother".

== Reception ==
Richie Unterberger from AllMusic gave the album 3 out of 5 saying "This seems to be A&M's (unsuccessful) attempt to break ex-Seeker Judith Durham into the American pop market. Not much of The Seekers' folk-pop is left on this heavily, though tastefully, orchestrated production. Durham and her handlers seem to be aiming for a Judy Collins-like Baroque-folk on many cuts, and (in other parallel with Collins) some theatrical art song-informed songs. Durham's voice is not as good or expressive as Collins', and her material isn't as stellar either. For all that, this isn't a bad record, particularly when it does get into its most melancholy classical-Baroque arrangements on "Wanderlove," "There's a Baby," and similar numbers. A couple of Mason Williams songs, "Wanderlove" and "Here Am I," are among the better offerings, and there's also a relatively little-known Harry Nilsson song, "Wailing of the Willow"."

== Track listing ==
LP/ Cassette

1. "Wanderlove" (Mason Williams) - 2:35
2. "I Wish I Knew" (Roger Nichols, Hal Levy) - 2:50
3. "There's a Baby" (Alan Bernstein, Vic Millrose) - 2:52
4. "That's How My Love Is" (Clive Westlake) - 3:10
5. "I Can Say" (David Reilly) - 3:38
6. "Gift of Song" (Patti Ingalls) - 3:08
7. "Wailing of the Willow" (Harry Nilsson) - 2:29
8. "The Light Is Dark Enough" (Jean Maitland, Richard Kerr) - 2:39
9. "Take Care of My Brother" (Art Podell) - 3:00
10. "God Bless the Child" (Arthur Herzog, Jr., Billie Holiday) - 2:49
11. "Here Am I" (Mason Williams) - 2:33

== Personnel ==
- Guitar: Michael Anthony, David Blue, Dennis Budimir
- Bass guitar: Steven LaFever
- Keyboards: Larry Knechtel, Lincoln Mayorga, Michel Rubini, Joe Sample
- Drums: Hal Blaine
- Percussion: Larry Bunker, Gene Estes, Victor Feldman, Ken Watson
- Saxophone, flute: Gene Cipriano, Bud Shank, June Russo, Tom Scott
- French horn: Vincent DeRosa, Richard Perissi
- Trumpet: John Andino, Buddy Childers, Maurice Harris, Tony Terran, Graham Young
- Trombone: Gilbert Falco, Dick Nash, George Roberts, Lloyd Ulyate
- Harp: Catherine Gotthoffer
- Concert Master: Erno Neufeld
