= Reach Out for the One Who Loves You =

Single by Mark Holden

from the album Encounter
- B-side: "Stay With Me"
- Released: August 1977
- Recorded: Studios 301
- Genre: soft rock, Pop rock
- Label: EMI Music
- Songwriter(s): P. Hawkins
- Producer(s): Richard Lush

Mark Holden singles chronology
"Hey, My Love" (1977)	"Reach Out for the One Who Loves You" (1977)	"Let's Go Dancing" (1977)

"Reach Out for the One Who Loves You" is a song by Australian singer songwriter Mark Holden. It was released as the lead single from Holden's third studio album, Encounter (1977). The song peaked at number 17 on the Kent Music Report.

== Track listing ==
7"/ Cassette (EMI 11481)

Side A

1. "Reach Out for the One Who Loves " - 2:50

Side B

1. "Stay With Me" - 3:37

== Charts ==
Chart (1977)	Peak position
Australia KMR	17
