= Judith Durham and The Hottest Band in Town Volume 2 =

Studio album by Judith Durham
- Released: 10 September 1974
- Recorded: Intervision
- Genre: Jazz, big band
- Label: Pye Records
- Producer: Ron Edgeworth

Judith Durham chronology
Judith Durham and The Hottest Band in Town (1974)	Judith Durham and The Hottest Band in Town Volume 2 (1974)	The Hot Jazz Duo (1979)

Judith Durham and The Hottest Band in Town volume 2 is the fifth studio album from Australian recording artist Judith Durham. The album was released in September 1974. The album was Durham's second album released via Pye Records.

The album was re-released on CD and Digital download in 2012.

== Track listing ==
LP/ Cassette

- A1 "Basin Street Blues" (Spencer Williams)
- A2 "Papa If You Can't Do Better" (Ron Edgeworth)
- A3 "The Man I Love" (George Gershwin/Ira Gershwin)
- A4 "Nobody's Blues But Mine" (Clarence Williams)
- A5 "The Hottest Band In Town" (Judith Durham)
- A6 "Coney Island Washboard" (Hampton Durand/Jerry Adams/Ned Nester/Claude Shugart)
- B1 "Down by the Riverside" (Traditional)
- B2 "What'll I Do" (Irving Berlin)
- B3 "Louisville Lou" (Milton Ager/Jack Yellen)
- B4 "It's Going to Be a Beautiful Day" (Judith Durham/Stephen Eldridge)
- B5 "The Entertainer" (Scott Joplin)
- B6 "Chase the Blues Away" (Judith Durham)
- B7 "On Revival Day" (Andy Razaf)
