= After You've Gone (song) =

1918 song

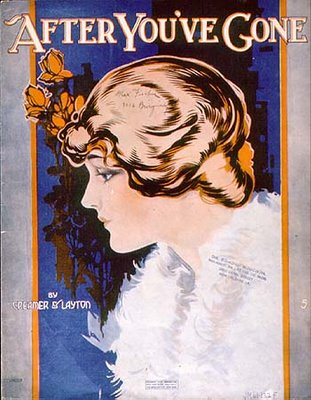
- Sheet music cover (1918)

Song
- Published: 1918 by Broadway Music Corp.
- Composer: Turner Layton
- Lyricist: Henry Creamer

Audio sample
- Recording of After You've Gone, performed by Marion Harris (1918): file; help
- Instrumental performance by musicians from the U.S. Coast Guard Band: file; help

"After You've Gone" is a 1918 popular song and jazz standard composed by Turner Layton with lyrics by Henry Creamer.

== History ==
It was recorded by Marion Harris on July 22, 1918, and released by Victor Records.

After the song became popular, the sheet music was decorated with tiny photographs of forty-five men who had helped to make it famous, including Paul Whiteman, Rudy Vallée, B.A. Rolfe, Guy Lombardo, and Louis Armstrong.

== Composition ==
The chorus adheres to a standard ABAC pattern but is only 20 measures long. There are four 4-bar phrases, followed by a 4-measure tag. The song is harmonically active, with chord changes in almost every measure. The opening four notes to the chorus are identical to the opening notes of "Peg o' My Heart" (1912) — at the time songwriters often borrowed the first few notes of a hit melody.

== Notable recordings ==
Year	Performer	Work	Source
1918	Marion Harris		
1918	Henry Burr and Albert Campbell		
	Billy Murray and Gladys Rice		
1927	Sophie Tucker		
1927	Bessie Smith		
1927	Ruth Etting		
1929	Louis Armstrong		
1929	Miff Mole And His Little Molers	OKeh 41445 (78); recorded 1929-09-24	
1929, 1946	Bing Crosby with Paul Whiteman		
1930	Red Nichols with Jack Teagarden		
1930	Fats Waller with Benny Payne		
1931	Eddie Lang, Joe Venuti, Jack Teagarden, Benny Goodman		
1933	Duke Ellington		
1934	Gene Austin, Candy Candido, Otto Heimel	Sadie McKee	
1935	Benny Goodman	Make Mine Music	
1935	Coleman Hawkins		
1936, 1949	Django Reinhardt/Stephane Grappelli		
1937	Roy Eldridge		
1937	Lionel Hampton		
1937	Quintette du Hot Club de France		
1941	Gene Krupa with Roy Eldridge		
1942	Judy Garland	For Me and My Gal	
1943	Sidney Bechet		
1944	Art Tatum		
1944	Charlie Parker	Jazz at the Philharmonic	
1949	Al Jolson		
1953	Turk Murphy		
1953	Frankie Laine		
1954	Cal Tjader		
1955	Judy Garland	Miss Show Business	
1957	Toshiko Akiyoshi	The Many Sides of Toshiko	
1957	Eydie Gorme	Eydie Swings the Blues	
1957	The Dukes of Dixieland	The Phenomenal Dukes of Dixieland - You Have To Hear It To Believe It! Vol. 2	
1958	Dinah Washington	Dinah Sings Bessie Smith	
1959	Johnny Hartman	And I Thought About You	
1959	Joni James	Joni Sings Sweet	
1959	Sonny Stitt	The Hard Swing	
1960	Tony Bennett	Alone Together	
1961	Judy Garland	Judy at Carnegie Hall	
1961	Helen Shapiro	Helen	
1961	Louis Prima	Return of the Wildest	
1962	Brook Benton	There Goes That Song Again	
1962	Ella Fitzgerald	Rhythm Is My Business	
1963	Alice Babs		
1963	Shirley Horn	Shirley Horn with Horns	
1963	Rita Reys	Jazz Sir, That's Our Baby	
1964	Peggy Lee	In the Name of Love	
1965	Bobby Darin	Bobby Darin Sings The Shadow of Your Smile	
1973	Judith Durham	Judith Durham and The Hottest Band in Town	
1974	Nina Simone		
1975	Anita O'Day	My Ship	
1978	Max Bygraves	LingaLongaMax	
1979	Leland Palmer, Ann Reinking, Erzsebet Foldi	All That Jazz	
1984	Frank Sinatra	L.A. Is My Lady	
1989	Charly Antolini & Dick Morrissey	Cookin'	
1991	Mel Tormé & Cleo Laine	Nothing Without You	
1994	Chet Atkins & Suzy Bogguss	Read My Licks	
1995	Nicholas Payton	Gumbo Nouveau	
1996	Phil Collins	live at Montreux Jazz Festival	
1998	Wynton Marsalis	Standard Time, Vol. 5: The Midnight Blues	
1999	Joscho Stephan	Swinging Strings	
2003	Anthony Braxton	23 Standards	
2004	Anne Murray	I'll Be Seeing You	
2004	Loudon Wainwright III	The Aviator	
2004	James Gelfand		
2006	Bireli Lagrene		
2007	Rufus Wainwright & Lorna Luft	Rufus Does Judy at Carnegie Hall	
2007	Jamie Cullum		
2010	Cécile McLorin Salvant	Cécile & the Jean-François Bonnel Paris Quintet	
2011	Hugh Laurie, Dr. John	Let Them Talk	
2013	Jessy Carolina	BioShock Infinite	
2014	Mackenzie Davis	That Awkward Moment	
2016	Salvador Sobral	Excuse Me	
2020	Curtis Stigers	Gentleman	
2020	Victoria Pedretti	Amazing Stories	
2020	Jane Bordeaux	Songs of Others	
2020	The Oxcentrics		
2021	Patrick Bartley & Emmet Cohen		

== See also ==
- List of pre-1920 jazz standards
