= Let Me Love You (album) =

Studio album by Mark Holden
- Released: October 1976
- Genre: Pop, Pop rock
- Label: EMI Music

Mark Holden chronology
Dawn in Darkness (1975)	Let Me Love You (1976)	Encounter (1977)

Singles from Let Me Love You
- 1. "Never Gonna Fall in Love Again" Released: April 1976; 2. "I Wanna Make You My Lady" Released: August 1976; 3. "Last Romance" Released: November 1976

Let Me Love You is the second studio album by Australian singer-songwriter Mark Holden. The album was released in October 1976 and peaked at number 20 on The Australian Charts. The album was certified double gold in Australia.

== Background and release ==
In early 1976, Holden received a call from Colin Petersen, EMI Music Australia's A&R representative, who suggested he cover Eric Carmen's "Never Gonna Fall in Love Again". In his 2017 autobiography, Holden said "This was a watershed moment, the opportunity to do covers versus originals. I didn't have a lot of new material. I was a greasy-haired folkie hippie, and the first album had sucked up everything I'd done... Recording "Never Gonna Fall in Love Again" was a chance for me to have a hit". The song peaked at number 13 on the Australian Kent Music Report, which was followed up by "I Wanna Make You My Lady", an English-version of the Swedish song "Jag ska fånga en ängel" by Ted Gärdestad, which peaked at number 11.

== Track listing ==
Side one
No.	Title	Writer(s)	Length
1.	"I Wanna Make You My Lady"	Ted Gärdestad, Ken Gärdestad, Gary Osborne
2.	"Let Me Forgive You, You Forgive Me"	Ian Mason
3.	"You"	Randy Edelman
4.	"Firefly"	Holden
5.	"White Sport Coat (And a Red Carnation)"	Robbins
6.	"Never Gonna Fall in Love Again"	Eric Carmen

Side two
No.	Title	Writer(s)	Length
1.	"Hurricane Rider"	Holden
2.	"Never Ever Monday"	Holden
3.	"Last Romance"	Beeb Birtles	2:50
4.	"Let Me Love You Once Before You Go"	Molly-Ann Leikin, Stephen Doff
5.	"Favourite Entertainer"	Phil Cody, Neil Sedaka
6.	"Millicent"	Holden

== Charts ==
Chart (1976/77)	Peak position
Australian Albums (Kent Music Report)	20

== Certifications ==
Region	Certification	Certified units/sales
Australia (ARIA)	2× Gold	40,000^{^}
^{^} Shipments figures based on certification alone.
