= Dawn in Darkness =

Studio album by Mark Holden
- Released: 1975
- Recorded: Sydney, Australia
- Genre: Pop, Pop rock
- Label: EMI Music
- Producer: Peter Dawkins

Mark Holden chronology
Dawn in Darkness (1975)	Let Me Love You (1976)

Dawn in Darkness is the debut studio album by Australian singer and songwriter Mark Holden. The album was recorded and released in 1975.

In an interview on the ABC TV program Talking Heads, Holden said that it sold about 2,000 copies only and was a "big flop", adding: "It was entirely original, all the songs I wrote as a kid. But it took me, got me out into the world. It got me into the game."

== Background and release ==
In 1974, Holden entered Showcase '74, a television talent show on Network 9, on which he sang original folky songs. He ultimately placed fifth, performing "Tap Dancing Down Easy Street" in the final. John Bromwell, from Essex Music of Australia, saw his performances and brought Holden to Sydney. Bromwell arranged an audition with Peter Dawkins, a record producer with EMI Music, who signed Holden. The album is a collection of songs Holden had written leading up to Showcase '74.

== Track listing ==
Side one
No.	Title	Writer(s)	Length
1.	"Summer Rain"	Mark Holden	2:57
2.	"Till Summers Fade"	Holden, Craig Holden	2:07
3.	"Mike's Song To The Sea"	Holden, Michael Bond	2:52
4.	"There'll Come a Day"	Holden,	2:19
5.	"Dawn in Darkness"	Holden	2:54
6.	"Hello Sunshine"	Holden	2:36

Side two
No.	Title	Writer(s)	Length
1.	"Carry Me Down"	Holden	2:05
2.	"Blue Jean Dream"	Holden	3:20
3.	"Feeling Happy"	Holden	2:02
4.	"Chasing Rainbows"	Holden	2:31
5.	"Clear and Cold"	Holden	2:44
6.	"Finale"	Holden, Peter Martin	2:26
