= Hey, My Love =

Single by Mark Holden
- B-side: "We Have Love"
- Released: 7 February 1977
- Genre: pop music
- Length: 3:04
- Label: EMI Music
- Songwriter(s): Mark Radice
- Producer(s): Richard Lush

Mark Holden singles chronology
"Last Romance" (1976)	"Hey, My Love" (1977)	"Reach Out for the One Who Loves You" (1977)

"Hey, My Love" is a song by Australian singer songwriter Mark Holden. It was released in February 1977 and peaked at number 32 on the Kent Music Report.

Holden performed the song live on Countdown during its 100th episode on 3 April 1977.

== Track listing ==
7"/ Cassette (EMI 11367)

Side A

1. "Hey, My Love" - 3:04

Side B

1. "We Have Love" - 3:47

== Charts ==
Chart (1977)	Peak position
Australia (Kent Music Report)	32
