= Last Romance =

Single by Mark Holden

from the album Let Me Love You
- B-side: "Hurricane Rider"
- Released: November 1976
- Genre: soft rock, Pop rock
- Length: 2:50
- Label: EMI Music
- Songwriter(s): Beeb Birtles
- Producer(s): Richard Lush

Mark Holden singles chronology
| "I Wanna Make You My Lady" (1976) | "Last Romance" (1976) | "Hey, My Love" (1977) |

"Last Romance" is a song by Australian singer songwriter Mark Holden. It was released in November 1976 as the third and final single from Holden's second studio album, Let Me Love You (1976). The song was a commercial success peaking at number 11 on the Kent Music Report.

== Track listing ==
7"/ Cassette (EMI 11304)

Side A

1. "Last Romance" - 2:50

Side B

1. "Hurricane Rider" - 3:37

== Charts ==
=== Weekly charts ===
| Chart (1976/77) | Peak position |
|---|---|
| Australia (Kent Music Report) | 11 |

=== Year-end charts ===
| Chart (1977) | Position |
|---|---|
| Australia (Kent Music Report) | 99 |
