= So Much More (Judith Durham album) =

Compilation album by Judith Durham
- Released: 26 June 2018
- Recorded: various
- Label: Decca; Universal Music Australia
- Producer: Mark Holden

Judith Durham chronology
An a Cappella Experience (2016)	So Much More (2018)

So Much More is a compilation album of previously unreleased tracks by Australian recording artist Judith Durham. The album was released in June 2018.

Upon release, Durham confirmed she would not tour, saying: "I won't be on the stage. No, I'm telling everyone I'm singing for them virtually now. I don't think I'll be touring again."

So Much More was Durham's final release before her death in 2022.

== Background and release ==
So Much More is a collection of 14 previously unreleased tracks, some of whose origins date back decades and were all written (or co-written) by Durham. Durham told The Australian: "I was always doing other projects, and never quite got back to this material. The Seekers toured, Judith toured, broken hips — God knows what. It's amazing I'm still alive. There's always too much to do. I just can't keep track because it's a very creative life."

The title track "So Much More" was a previously unreleased 1967 recording. The album includes tracks co-written by fellow Seeker Keith Potger, Adam Thompson of Chocolate Starfish and Mark Holden (who was an executive producer of the album, along with Graham Simpson and Mahlia Simpson). The album was released to celebrate Durham's 75th birthday on 3 July.

== Track listing ==
1. "It Takes What It Takes" – 3:59
2. "You Are My Star" – 4:12
3. "Time Has Come to Part" – 5:00
4. "Bluer Than Blue" – 4:14
5. "We're Back Together Again" – 3:47
6. "Follow Me" – 2:51
7. "Anchor of My Life" – 3:35
8. "Seven Bridges Road" – 3:50
9. "Walk On" – 4:46
10. "Under the Southern Cross" – 4:01
11. "Come on Over to Our House" – 3:39
12. "I Never Knew My Daddy" – 3:05
13. "All You Have to Do" – 4:04
14. "So Much More" – 2:16

== Charts ==
Chart (2018)	Peak position
Australian Albums (ARIA)	46
Australian (ARIA) Jazz and Blues Chart	1

== Release history ==
Region	Date	Format(s)	Label	Catalogue
Australia	29 June 2018	CD, digital download	Musicoast, Universal Music Australia, Decca	6772420
