= I Wanna Make You My Lady =

Single by Mark Holden

from the album Let Me Love You
- B-side: "Never Ever Monday"
- Released: August 1976
- Genre: Soft rock, pop rock
- Length: 2:39
- Label: EMI
- Songwriter(s): Ted Gärdestad; Kenneth Gärdestad; Gary Osborne
- Producer(s): Richard Lush

Mark Holden singles chronology
"Never Gonna Fall in Love Again" (1976)	"I Wanna Make You My Lady" (1976)	"Last Romance" (1976)

"I Wanna Make You My Lady" is a song by Australian singer songwriter Mark Holden. It was recorded and released as the second single from Holden's second studio album, Let Me Love You (1976). The song was a commercial success in Australia, peaking at number 11 on the Kent Music Report.

The song is an English translation of the Swedish song "Jag ska fånga en ängel", originally written by Swedish singer-songwriters Ted and Kenneth Gärdestad, with English lyrics written by Gary Osborne.

== Track listing ==
7"/ Cassette (EMI-11195)

Side A

1. "I Wanna Make You My Lady" - 2:39

Side B

1. "Never Ever Monday" - 2:26

== Charts ==
=== Weekly charts ===
Chart (1976)	Peak position
Australia (Kent Music Report)	11

=== Year-end charts ===
Chart (1976)	Rank
Australia (Kent Music Report)	73
