= Australian Welsh Male Choir =

- Origin: Frankston, Victoria, Australia
- Genre: Choral
- Years active: 1974–present
- Website: www.awmc.org.au

The Australian Welsh Male Choir is a Welsh male voice choir from Frankston in Melbourne, Victoria, Australia.

== History ==
Originally known as the Frankston Welsh Male Choir its first performance was the dedication of the chapel at the Victoria Police Academy on 20 October 1974, which was broadcast on television by the Australian Broadcasting Corporation. In 1980, it changed its name to the Victoria Welsh Male Choir.

In 1984, it toured the United Kingdom and became the first choir outside of Wales to sing as part of the 1000 Voice Festival of Male Choirs at the Royal Albert Hall in London. It was invited to join the Welsh Association Of Male Choirs during this tour, becoming the first choir outside Wales to be offered such membership, and remains its only Australian member. Upon returning to Australia, in 1985, it changed its name to the Australian Welsh Male Choir.

The choir was invited to sing again at the 1000 Voice Festival in 1988. At the festival, in celebration of the Australian bicentenary year, it gave a solo performance of “I Still Call Australia Home” by Peter Allen. To date, it remains the only choir to have performed solo at the festival.

== Discography ==
Title	Album details
Songs of Christmas and Beyond	Released: 2002; Format: CD
Heart and Soul	Released: 2004; Format: CD
From Showtime to Opera	Released: 2005; Format: CD
Far Away a Voice is Calling	Released: 2008; Format: CD
Australian Welsh in the Land of the Long White Cloud	Released: 2008; Format: CD
Moments	Released: 2010; Format: CD
By Request	Released: 20 November 2012; Label: Move Records; Formats: CD, digital download
Celebrate (40 Years)	Released: 24 October 2013; Label: Move Records; Formats: CD, digital download

== Patrons ==
- Tammy Fraser AO
- Haydn James
