= Judith Durham =

Australian singer, songwriter and musician (1943–2022)

Judith Durham AO
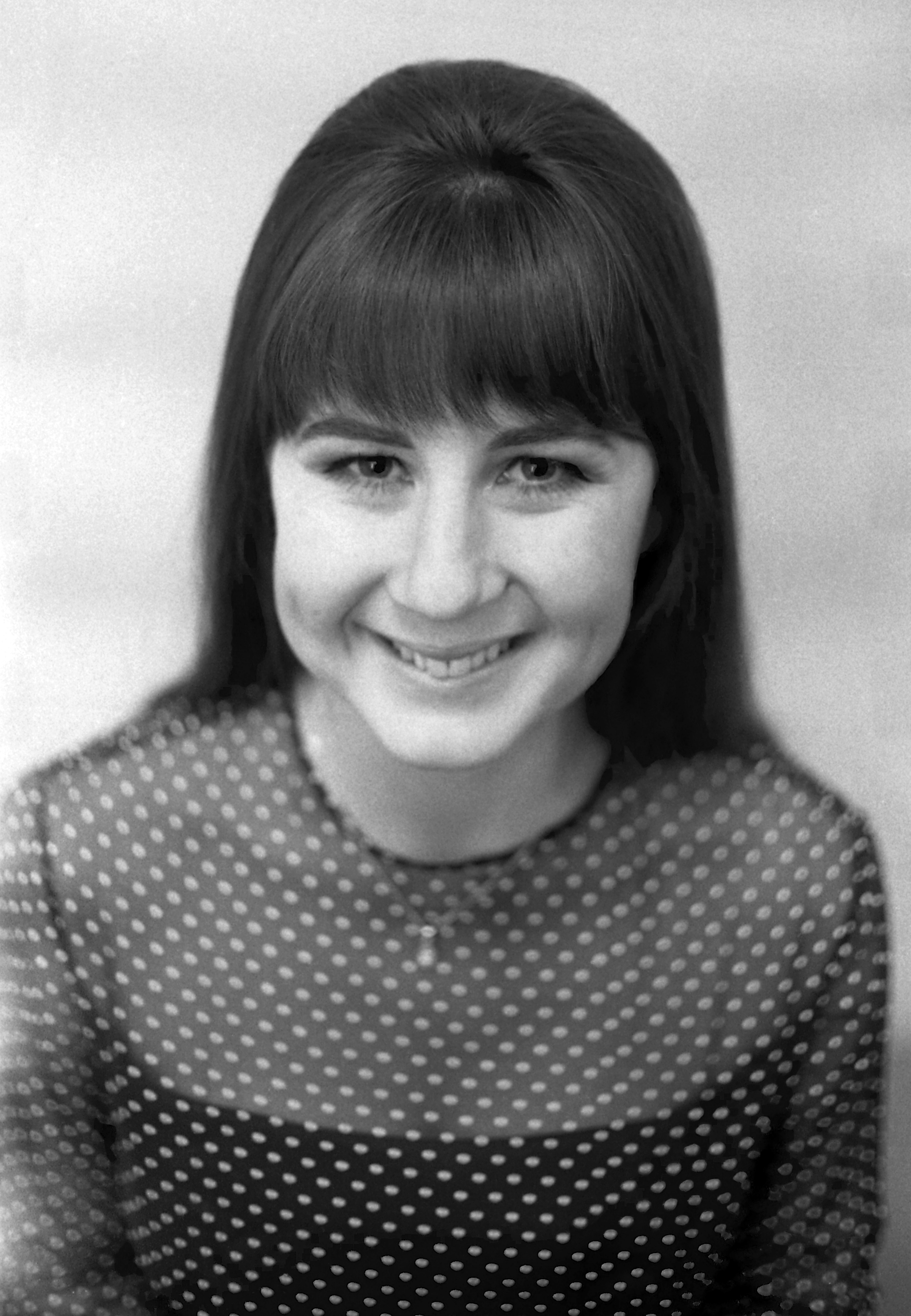
- Durham in 1970

Background information
- Born: Judith Mavis Cock; 3 July 1943; Essendon, Victoria, Australia
- Died: 5 August 2022 (aged 79) Prahran, Victoria, Australia
- Genres: Folk; Jazz; Gospel
- Occupations: Singer; songwriter; musician
- Instruments: Vocals; piano; tambourine
- Years active: 1961–2022
- Labels: Columbia, A&M, Pye, EMI, Decca
- Website: judithdurham.com

Judith Durham (born Judith Mavis Cock; 3 July 1943 – 5 August 2022) was an Australian singer, songwriter and musician who became the lead singer of the Australian folk music group the Seekers in 1962.

The Seekers became the first Australian pop music group to achieve major chart and sales success in the United Kingdom and the United States and have sold over 50 million records worldwide. Durham left the group in mid-1968 to pursue her solo career. From 1993, she began to make sporadic recordings and performances with the Seekers, though she remained primarily a solo performer. On 1 July 2015, during the annual Victoria Day celebrations, she was named Victorian of the Year for her services to music and a range of charities.

== Early life ==
Durham was born Judith Mavis Cock on 3 July 1943 in Essendon, Victoria, to William Alexander Cock, a navigator and World War II pathfinder, and his wife, Hazel (née Durham). From her birth until 1949, she lived on Mount Alexander Road, Essendon. She spent summer holidays at her family's weatherboard house (which since has been demolished) on the west side of Durham Place in Rosebud.

Her father accepted work in Hobart, Tasmania, in 1949. From early 1950, the family lived in Taroona, a suburb of Hobart, where Durham attended the Fahan School before moving back to Melbourne, residing in Georgian Court, Balwyn, in 1956. She was educated at Ruyton Girls' School in Kew and then enrolled at RMIT.

Durham at first planned to be a pianist and gained the qualification of Associate in Music, Australia (AMusA), in classical piano at the University of Melbourne Conservatorium. She had some professional engagements playing piano, had classical vocal training as a soprano, and performed blues, gospel, and jazz pieces. Her singing career began one night at the age of 18 when she asked Nicholas Ribush, leader of the Melbourne University Jazz Band, at the Memphis Jazz Club in Malvern, whether she could sing with the band. In 1963, she began performing at the same club with Frank Traynor's Jazz Preachers, using her mother's maiden name of Durham. In that year she also recorded her first EP, Judy Durham, with Frank Traynor's Jazz Preachers for W&G Records.

== The Seekers ==
The Seekers consisted of Durham, Athol Guy, Bruce Woodley and Keith Potger, an ABC (Australian Broadcasting Corp.) radio producer. Through Potger's position the three were able to make a demo tape in their spare time. This was given to W&G Records, which wanted another sample of Durham's voice before agreeing to record a Jazz Preachers' album. W&G instead signed the Seekers for an album, Introducing the Seekers, in 1963. Durham, however, recorded two other songs with the Jazz Preachers, "Muddy Water" (which appeared on their album Jazz from the Pulpit) and "Trombone Frankie" (an adapted version of Bessie Smith's "Trombone Cholly").

In early 1964, the Seekers sailed to the United Kingdom on SS Fairsky on which the group provided the musical entertainment. Originally, they had planned to return after 10 weeks, but they received a steady stream of bookings through the Grade Agency because they had sent the agency a copy of their first album. On 4 November 1964 at EMI's Abbey Road Studios, the Seekers recorded "I'll Never Find Another You", written and produced by Tom Springfield. In February 1965, the song reached number one in the UK and Australia. The group had further Top 10 hits with "A World of Our Own", "Morningtown Ride" and "Someday, One Day". "Georgy Girl" reached number two (Billboard chart) and number one (Cashbox chart) in the United States. "The Carnival Is Over" is still one of the top 50 best-selling singles in the UK.

On 12 March 1967, the Seekers set an official all-time Australian record when more than 200,000 people (nearly one tenth of the city's entire population at that time) flocked to their performance at the Sidney Myer Music Bowl in Melbourne. Their TV special The Seekers Down Under scored the biggest TV audience ever (with a 67 rating), and early in 1968 they were all awarded the nation's top honour as "Australians of the Year 1967". On a tour of New Zealand in February 1968, Durham advised the group that she was leaving the Seekers to pursue a solo career. In a 2016 interview on ABC’s One Plus One, she explained that she also wished to marry before the age of 25 and anticipated that marriage and family responsibilities would limit her ability to continue performing. This, along with her desire to pursue her passion of jazz and gospel music, led her to decide to go solo. Their last concert before Durham left the group was on a live BBC production on 7 July when they performed many of their hits.

== Solo career ==
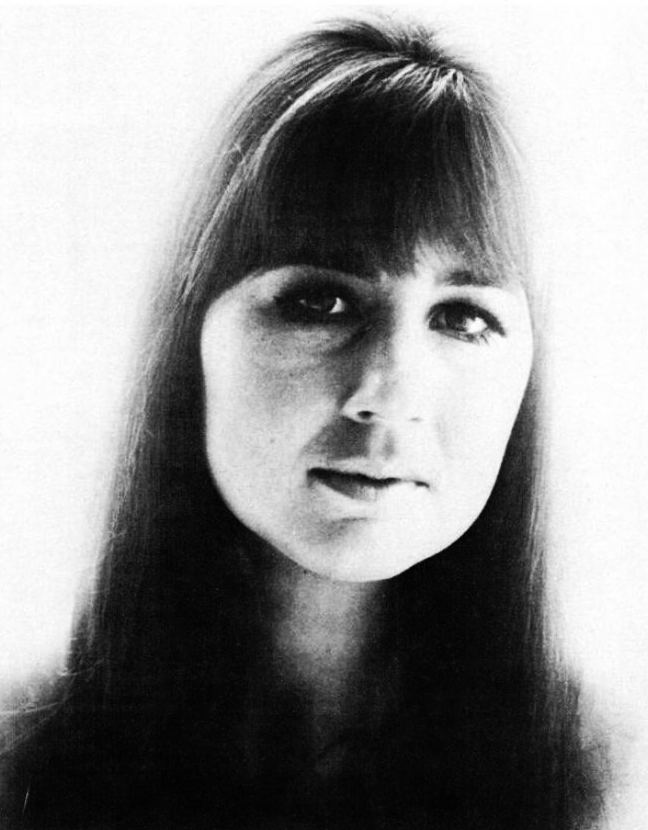
Promotional photo for Durham's solo album Gift of Song, 1970

Durham returned to Australia in August 1968 and her first solo television special, An Evening with Judith Durham, screened on the Nine Network in September. During her solo career, she released albums titled For Christmas with Love, Gift of Song and Climb Ev'ry Mountain. In 1970, she made the television special Meet Judith Durham in London, ending with her rendition of "When You Come to the End of a Perfect Day" by Carrie Jacobs-Bond.

In 1975, Durham guest starred in "The Golden Girl", an episode of the Australian television series Cash and Company. Along with husband Ron Edgeworth on piano, she performed six songs; "Oh Susanna", "When Starlight Fades", "Maggie Mae", "Rock of Ages", "There's No Place Like Home" and "The Lord Is My Shepherd".

Durham staged a series of concerts at The Troubadour, Melbourne, in 1987 with Edgeworth, performing originals the two had written. They returned the following year.

In January 1992, Durham released "Australia Land of Today" which peaked at number 124 on the ARIA charts."

In 2003, Durham toured the UK in "The Diamond Tour" celebrating her 60th birthday. The tour included the Royal Festival Hall and a CD and DVD of the concert were issued.

In 2006, Durham started modernising the music and phrases of "Advance Australia Fair", the Australian national anthem; the Aboriginal singer-songwriter Kutcha Edwards also contributed lyrics. Durham first performed it in May 2009 at Federation Hall, St Kilda Road. It was released as a CD single.

Durham recorded The Australian Cities Suite album with all proceeds to go to the charitable sector. The album was released in October 2008. This project was to benefit charities working with the Lord Mayor's Charitable Fund, including Orchestra Victoria and the Motor Neuron Disease Association of Australia (Durham was national patron).

On 13 February 2009, Durham made a surprise return to the Sydney Myer Music Bowl when she performed the closing number at the RocKwiz Salutes the Bowl – Sidney Myer Music Bowl 50th Anniversary with "The Carnival Is Over". On 23 May 2009, she performed a one-hour a cappella concert in Melbourne as a launch for her album Up Close and Personal.

In October 2011, Durham signed an exclusive international deal with Decca Records. George Ash, president of Universal Music Australasia, said that "It is an honour to have Judith Durham join Decca's wonderful roster of artists. When you think of the legends that have graced the Decca Records catalogue it is the perfect home to welcome Judith to, and we couldn't be more excited to work with Judith on not only her new recordings but her incredible catalogue as well."

In June 2018, to celebrate Durham's 75th birthday, a collection of 14 previously unreleased songs was released on the album So Much More.

== Personal life ==
On 21 November 1969, Durham married her musical director, British pianist Ron Edgeworth, at Scots' Church, Melbourne. Edgeworth had been with a group, the Trebletones, on the same tour.

Durham and her husband were vegetarian; she became a vegan after 2015. She also abstained from alcohol and caffeine.

They felt satisfied with each other and did not pursue having children. However, in a TV Interview of March 2010, she stated: "But, if children had come along, we always said we would have had them." They lived in the UK and Switzerland until the mid-1980s, when they bought property in Maleny near Nambour, Queensland. In 1990, Durham, Edgeworth and their tour manager, Peter Summers, were involved in a car accident on the Calder Freeway. The driver of the other car died at the scene and Durham sustained a fractured wrist and leg. The response from her fans led to Durham deciding to get back with the other members of the Seekers for a silver jubilee show in 1993. During this reunion, Edgeworth was diagnosed with motor neurone disease, also known as ALS. While the diagnosis was hard for both of them, and caused him to become disabled, they both tried to keep a positive outlook. In March 2010, Judith remarked: "Once he realized that death was inevitable for him, his attitude was very positive. (In) that he was looking towards after this life, focusing very strongly on that, as a positive thing. And, that helped me enormously, as I was already going through grief from the time of his diagnosis to a large extent." He died from the disease on 10 December 1994 with Durham by his side.

After the death of Edgeworth, Durham underwent anxiety and dealt with the feelings of grief while trying to cope with his loss. "I used to worry a lot about everything, in those days because I felt I was the doer. Now, I’ve relinquished all responsibility for anything! And, it’s much better. I think everyone should do that in their lives, you know. That’s changed my life. As they say - 'let go and let God'… And that’s the perfect expression. That’s what I have to do. There is no way around that. The day he doesn’t want me to be doing it I won’t be doing it obviously. But, at the moment, that’s the way I approached just about everything."

In the late 1990s, Durham was stalked by a former president of a Judith Durham fan club, a woman who sent her over 40 doormats as an admonishment for perceived ingratitude. She also sent Durham numerous abusive faxes, one threatening another doormat delivery worth over $45,000. The woman was subsequently prosecuted, and she was later imprisoned for other serial crimes.

In 2000, Durham broke her hip and was unable to sing "The Carnival Is Over" at the closing ceremony of the 2000 Olympic Games in Sydney with the Seekers. However, she sang it from a wheelchair at the 2000 Paralympics shortly thereafter.

In May 2013, during the Seekers' golden jubilee tour, Durham suffered a stroke that diminished her ability to read and write both visual language and musical scores. During her convalescence, she made progress to rebuild those skills. Her singing ability was not affected by the stroke.

== Religious faith ==
Durham was a devout Christian who had originally been hesitant about secular music. She frequently sang gospel and jazz songs which reflected this trait. She also followed other teachings that provided a moral and ethical framework for how she lived. In the Salvation Army's War Cry magazine of 12 November 2016, she revealed more information on her beliefs and spirituality and said that her "love songs were for the Lord". The article stated that "Judith describes herself as a deeply spiritual person with a proud belief in the love of God and Jesus Christ, and feels that many of the songs of her long career reflect that reality. The spirituality of the lyrics crosses over from being not just love songs, but love songs for the Lord - songs like "I'll Never Find Another You", "Walk with Me" and many others." Other songs that were published on the album Up Close and Personal with the same purpose included "Calling Me Home", "Colours of My Life", "Nobody but You", "Let Me Find Love", "Land of Peace" (the original version of "Carry Me"), "There He Is", among others. In the same article, she commented: "On my recent tour of New Zealand, there wasn't a moment on stage when I wasn't focused on the spiritual context of these songs."

On 22 December 2016, Durham posted a message on her official Facebook page. It gave an explanation of her concept of God to her followers. Part of it includes: "When I was just a child, growing up with dear Mum and Dad and sister Beverley, we were wisely taught to say our prayers each night, feeling protected and loved ... I never questioned any of it. For me, to this day, God and the Lord are real and I feel safe and nurtured by that ever-present reality."

She also posted: "A couple of years later, after we moved to Hobart, we started going to 'Sunday School' and I learned to sing: 'Jesus loves me this I know for the Bible tells me so.' Through the years I have a deeper spiritual understanding. There is a multi cultural, global truth for so many billions of loving souls. We all love the Lord God and God Incarnate according to many different pathways all over the world, and that the spirit of Christmas celebrations always bring that same joyous message. We were taught from our early age to honour our father and mother, and to live in love, peace and humility in the spirit of giving. Let us all be thankful for the food we eat this Christmas and all the blessings showered upon us everyday."

Durham felt that the values that were instilled in her since her youth had been still imprinted in her. She also stated that she had a very wide perception and that she had begun feeling interested in esoteric things.

== Health and death ==
Durham was born with asthma (which her mother also had), and at age four caught measles, which left her with a lifelong chronic lung disease, bronchiectasis. Along with that, she also had emphysema. As mentioned above, she broke her hip in 2000 and suffered a stroke in 2013.

Durham died from bronchiectasis at the Alfred Hospital in Melbourne on 5 August 2022, at age 79. She was given a state memorial service by the state of Victoria on 6 September 2022 at Hamer Hall. Durham is interred with her husband, Ron Edgeworth, at Springvale Botanical Cemetery, Springvale.

== Discography ==
=== Solo ===
==== Studio albums ====
List of studio albums with selected chart positions
Title	Album details	Peak chart positions			Certifications
Title	Album details	AUS	NZ	UK	Certifications
For Christmas with Love	Released: November 1968; Label: Goodyear, Columbia	—N/a	—	—	
Gift of Song	Released: 1970; Label: A&M Records	—	—	—	
Climb Ev'ry Mountain	Released: 1971; Label: A&M Records	44	—	—	
Judith Durham and The Hottest Band in Town	Released: June 1974; Label: Pye Records	—	—	—	
Judith Durham and The Hottest Band in Town Volume 2	Released: September 1974; Label: Pye Records	—	—	—	
Let Me Find Love	Released: April 1994; Label: EMI Records; Note: Re-released as Hold On to Your Dream in 2000	8	—	—	
Mona Lisas	Released: March 1996; Label: EMI Records; Note: Re-released as Always There in 1997	—	—	46	
Future Road (with The Seekers)	Released: October 1997; Label: EMI Records	4	13	—	ARIA: Platinum
The Australian Cities Suite	Released: October 2008; Label: Musicoat	81	—	—	
Up Close and Personal	Released: May 2009; Label: Musicoat; Note: Re-released as An Acappella Experience in 2016	—	—	—	
Epiphany	Released: October 2011; Label: Decca, UMA	—	—	—	
It's Christmas Time	Released: November 2013; Label: Decca, UMA	—	—	—	

=== Live albums ===
List of live albums with selected chart positions
Title	Album details	Peak chart positions			Certification
Title	Album details	AUS	NZ	UK	Certification
The Hot Jazz Duo (with Ron Edgeworth)	Released: April 1979; Label:	—	—	—	
25 Year Reunion Celebration (with The Seekers)	Released: November 1993; Label: EMI Music	9	22	93	ARIA: Platinum
1968 BBC Farewell Spectacular (with The Seekers)	Released: November 1999; Label: Mushroom	12	—	—	ARIA: Gold
Live in Concert (Melbourne Welsh Male Choir with Judith Durham)	Released: September 2002	—	—	—	
Live in London	Released: October 2014; Label: Decca, UMA	—	16	—	

=== Compilation albums ===
List of compilation albums with selected chart positions
Title	Album details	Peak chart positions			Certification
Title	Album details	AUS	NZ	UK	Certification
Australia's Own Judith Durham	Released: 1971 (Australian release); Label: Summit Records Australia	—	—	—	
Here Am I	Released: 1972 (international release); Label: A&M Records	—N/a	—	—	
The Silver Jubilee Album (with The Seekers)	Released: March 1993; Label: EMI Records	3	3	—N/a	ARIA: Platinum
A Carnival of Hits (with The Seekers)	Released: April 1994; Label: EMI Records	—N/a	—N/a	7	
Colours of My Life	Released: November 2011; Label: Decca, UMA	40	—	—	
The Platinum Album	Released: July 2013; Label: Decca, UMA	36	—	—	
So Much More	Released: 29 June 2018; Label: Decca, UMA	46	—	—	

=== Extended plays ===
List of extended plays with selected details
Title	Details
Judy Durham (with Frank Traynor's Jazz Preachers)	Released: 1963; Label: W&G

=== Charting singles ===
List of singles as lead artist, with selected chart positions, certifications, year released and album name
Title	Year	Peak chart positions	
Title	Year	AUS	UK
"The Olive Tree"	1967	—	33
"A World of Our Own" (with the Seekers)	1994	—	76
"Georgy Girl" (with the Seekers)	1994	—	79
"I Am Australian" (with Russell Hitchcock and Mandawuy Yunupingu)	1997	17	—

== Notable performances ==
- 1965 – The Seekers won the Best New Group in the New Musical Express Poll Winners Awards and performed on 11 April at the Wembley Empire Pool, on a bill that included the Beatles, the Rolling Stones, Cliff Richard and Dusty Springfield. Archive footage from this show was included in the Seekers' 2014 50th anniversary tour.
- 1965 – In June the Seekers performed in the United States on The Ed Sullivan Show singing "A World of Our Own" and "You Can Tell The World".
- 1966 – In November the Seekers performed at a Royal Command Performance at the London Palladium before the Queen Mother.
- 1967 – The Seekers made another appearance on The Ed Sullivan Show singing "Georgy Girl".
- 1967 – The Seekers represented Australia at Expo 67 in Montreal, Quebec, Canada (when they appeared on television in Australia via the first satellite transmission from the United States to Australia).
- 1967 – Melbourne, 12 March, Sidney Myer Music Bowl. The Seekers played to an estimated 200,000 people in a televised concert celebrating their overseas success.

== Honours and awards ==
=== ARIA Music Awards ===
The ARIA Music Awards are annual ceremonies presented by the Australian Recording Industry Association (ARIA) which recognise excellence, innovation and achievement across all genres of the music of Australia. They commenced in 1987. At the 2022 ARIA Music Awards a special tribute in her honour had "I'll Never Find Another You" performed by Casey Donovan and "The Carnival Is Over" by Dami Im.

Year	Nominee / work	Award	Result
1995	Judith Durham (and the Seekers)	Hall of Fame	Inducted

=== APRA Awards ===
These annual awards were established by Australasian Performing Right Association (APRA) in 1982 to honour the achievements of songwriters and music composers and to recognise their song writing skills, sales and airplay performance, by its members annually.

Year	Nominee / work	Award	Result
2013	Judith Durham (and the Seekers)	Ted Albert Award for Outstanding Services to Australian Music	awarded

=== Australian Women in Music Awards ===
The Australian Women in Music Awards is an annual event that celebrates outstanding women in the Australian Music Industry who have made significant and lasting contributions in their chosen field. They commenced in 2018.

Year	Nominee / work	Award	Result
2019	Judith Durham	AWMA Honour Roll	inducted

=== Music Victoria Awards ===
The Music Victoria Awards are an annual awards night celebrating Victorian music. They commenced in 2005.

Year	Nominee / work	Award	Result
2015	Judith Durham (and the Seekers)	Hall of Fame	inductee
