= List of Renaissance band members =

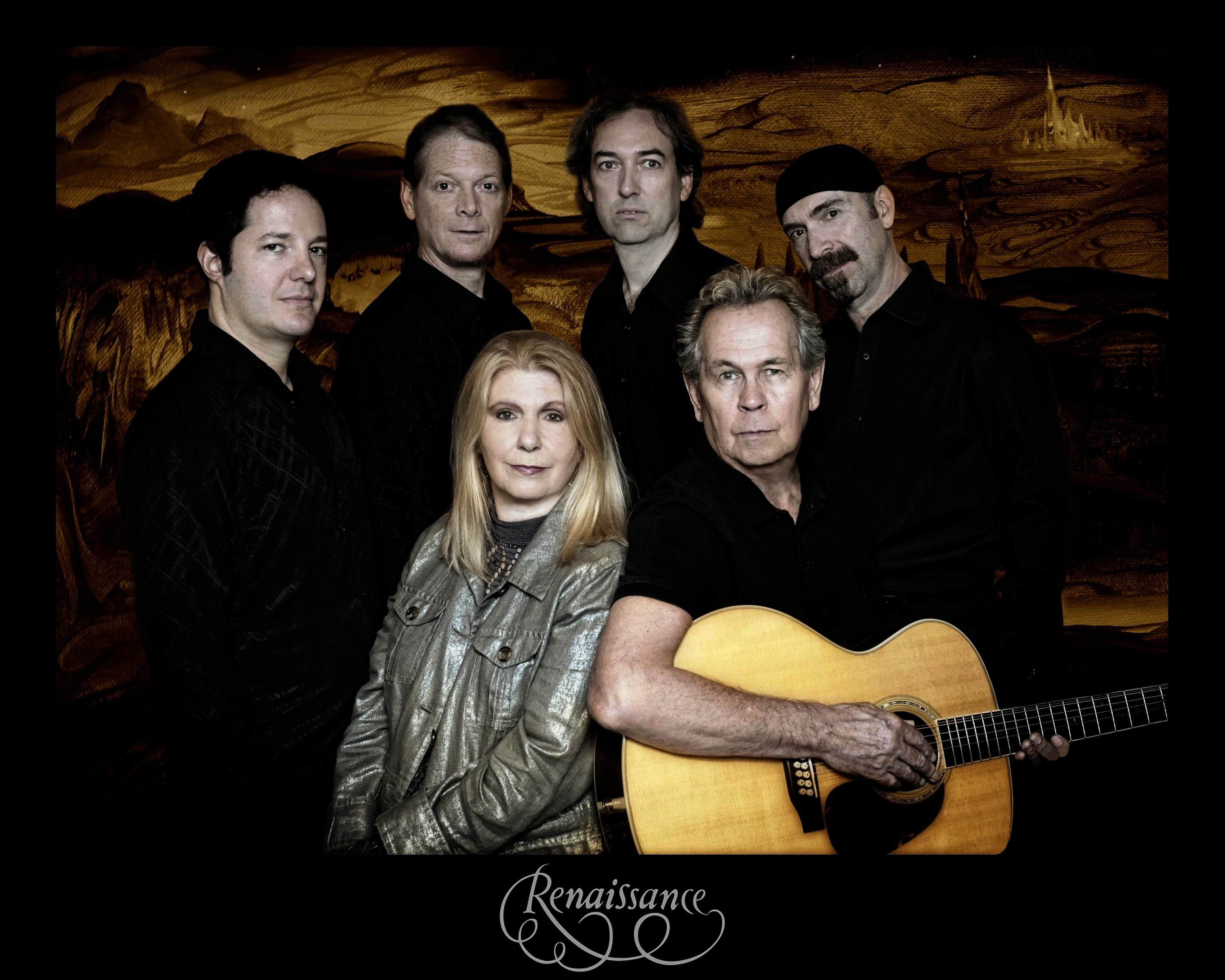
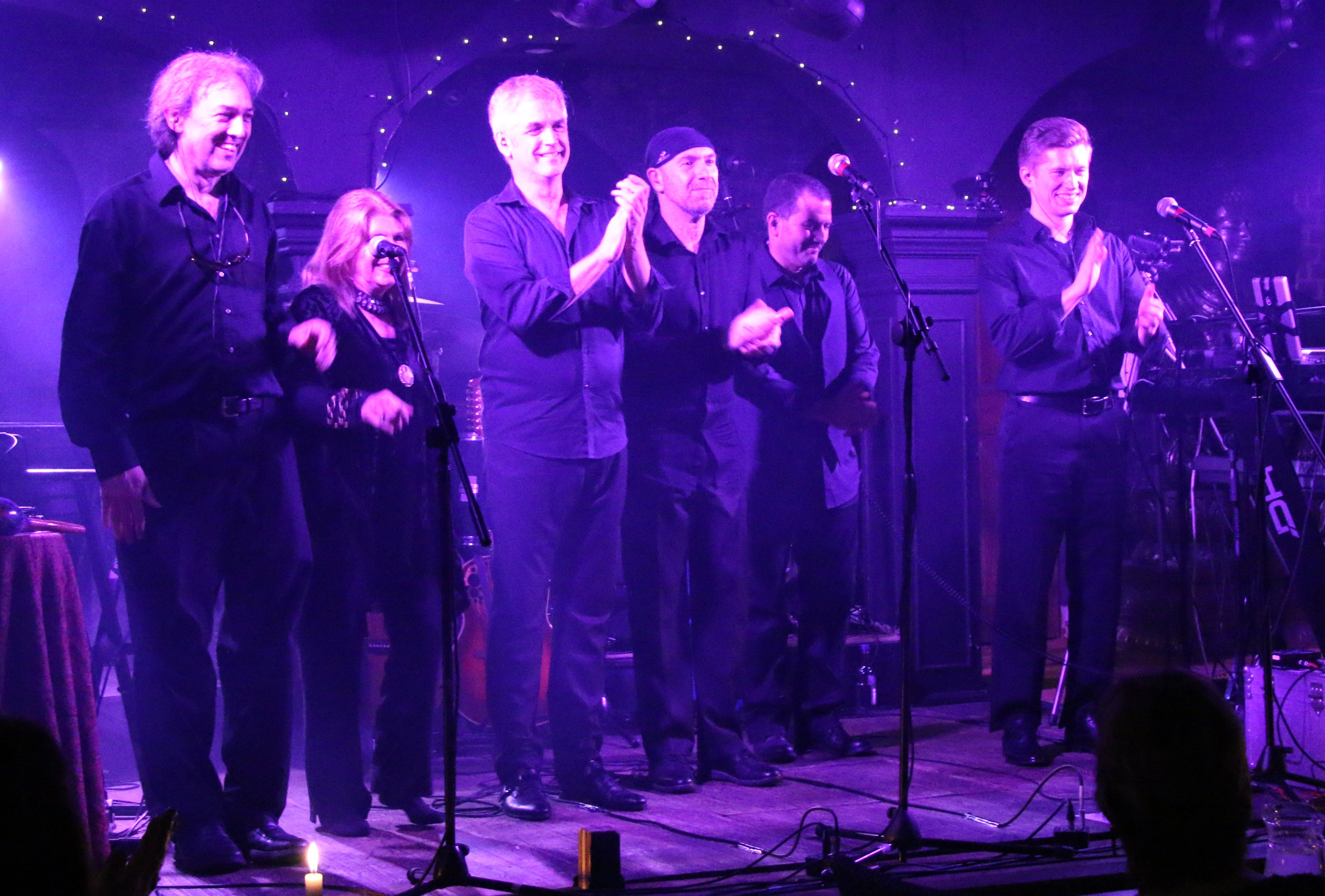
Two lineups of Renaissance in 2012 and 2016.

Renaissance are an English progressive rock band from London. Formed in spring 1969, the group originally consisted of lead vocalist Jane Relf, guitarist and vocalist Keith Relf, bassist Louis Cennamo, drummer and vocalist Jim McCarty, and keyboardist John Hawken. The band has been through many lineup changes, and currently includes lead vocalist Annie Haslam (since 1971), guitarist and vocalist Mark Lambert (from 1985 to 1987, and since 2015), keyboardist Rave Tesar (since 2001), drummer and vocalist Frank Pagano (since 2009), keyboardist and vocalist Geoffrey Langley (since 2016), and bassist and vocalist John Galgano (since 2023).

== History ==
=== 1969–1987 ===
Renaissance were formed in the spring of 1969 by former Yardbirds members Keith Relf (guitar, harmonica, vocals) and Jim McCarty (drums, percussion, vocals), who enlisted Relf's sister Jane on lead vocals and percussion, session bassist Louis Cennamo, and former Nashville Teens keyboardist John Hawken. After releasing just one self-titled album, however, the group's lineup fell apart – McCarty was first to leave due to illness, followed by Keith Relf and Cennamo. Hawken and Jane Relf completed Illusion with vocalist Terry Crowe, guitarist Michael Dunford, bassist Neil Korner and drummer Terry Slade. By October, Hawken and Slade had also left the group. They were replaced by John Tout and Anne-Marie "Binky" Cullom, respectively. Annie Haslam took over from Cullom in January 1971.

A few months into 1971, the band's manager Miles Copeland III decided to rebuild Renaissance around Haslam and Tout. Crowe departed and Korner was replaced a number of times, starting with Danny McCulloch, followed by Frank Farrell and later John Wetton. In 1972, Dunford stepped back from performing duty and was replaced by Mick Parsons, Ginger Dixon took over from Slade, and Wetton made way for Jon Camp. Just before recording for the band's next album Prologue began, Parsons died in a car accident and was replaced by Rob Hendry, while Dixon was replaced with Terry Sullivan. Hendry was replaced by Pete Finberg for a string of tour dates, before Dunford rejoined the band in time to record Ashes Are Burning. This lineup remained stable for seven years, releasing five more albums.

After the tour in promotion of 1979's Azure d'Or, Tout and Renaissance parted ways by mutual consent. In response, Sullivan also chose to leave the band. The group briefly disbanded, but returned with Camera Camera in 1981 and Time-Line in 1983, which featured session musicians Peter Barron (drums) and Peter Gosling (keyboards). In 1983, the band expanded again with the addition of drummer Gavin Harrison and keyboardist Mike Taylor, although they were replaced by Greg Carter and Raphael Rudd, respectively, a year later. Camp left in 1985, at which point Haslam and Dunford opted to tour as an acoustic quintet with Rudd, bassist Mark Lambert and percussionist Charles Descarfino. Renaissance eventually disbanded after a final touring cycle which ended in June 1987.

=== 1998 onwards ===
Haslam and Dunford reformed Renaissance in 1998 with former drummer Sullivan and keyboardist Tout, beginning work on new album Tuscany the next year. After the first recording session, Tout was replaced by Mickey Simmonds, who completed the rest of the album. Bass was recorded by guest contributors Roy Wood and Alex Caird. For the album's promotional tour, the group added bassist David J. Keyes and second keyboardist Rave Tesar, before they disbanded for a second time in 2002. In August 2009, Haslam and Dunford announced that Renaissance would be returning for a third time, touring in commemoration of the band's 40th anniversary. The group's lineup for the tour included returning members Keyes and Tesar, as well as drummer Frank Pagano and second keyboardist Tom Brislin.

By October 2010, Brislin had been replaced by Jason Hart. On 20 November 2012, Dunford died after suffering a cerebral hemorrhage. Despite the loss of a central member, Haslam assured that Renaissance would continue, and the following February it was announced that Ryche Chlanda would take over as the band's guitarist. Grandine il vento, a new studio album recorded prior to Dunford's death, was released a few months later. In 2015, Chlanda, Keyes and Hart were replaced by Mark Lambert, Leo Traversa and Tom Brislin, respectively. The following year, Brislin was replaced again by Geoffrey Langley. Charles Descarfino replaced Pagano in 2017 for an orchestral tour, although by 2018 the drummer had returned to the band. Later in the year, John Arbo replaced Traversa on bass, but only for shows that year. John Galgano of the band IZZ played bass with Renaissance during Cruise to the Edge in February 2023. He is touring with Renaissance in 2024.

== Members ==
=== Current ===
Image	Name	Years active	Instruments	Release contributions
	Annie Haslam	1971–1987; 1998–2002; 2009–present	lead and backing vocals; occasional percussion	all Renaissance releases from Prologue (1972) onwards, except Live+Direct (2002) and Past Orbits of Dust (2012)
	Mark Lambert	1985–1987; 2015–present	guitar and backing vocals (2015 onwards); bass (1985–1987)	Unplugged Live at the Academy of Music, Philadelphia USA (2000); Live at the Union Chapel (2015); A Symphonic Journey: Live in Concert (2018)
	Rave Tesar	2001–2002; 2009–present	keyboards; piano	In the Land of the Rising Sun: Live in Japan 2001 (2002); The Mystic and the Muse (2010); Tour 2011: Live in Concert (2012); Grandine il vento (2013); Live at the Union Chapel (2015); A Symphonic Journey: Live in Concert (2018)
	Frank Pagano	2009–2017; 2018–present	drums; percussion; backing vocals	The Mystic and the Muse (2010); Tour 2011: Live in Concert (2012); Grandine il Vento (2013); Live at the Union Chapel (2015)
	Geoffrey Langley	2016–present	keyboards; backing vocals	A Symphonic Journey: Live in Concert (2018)
	John Galgano	2023–present	bass; backing vocals	Renaissance In Gratitude Farewell Tour Live 2CDs (2025)

=== Former ===
Image	Name	Years active	Instruments	Release contributions
	John Hawken	1969–1970 (died 2024)	keyboards; piano	Renaissance (1969); Illusion (1971); Live+Direct (2002); Past Orbits of Dust (2012); Renaissance 50th Anniversary: Ashes Are Burning - An Anthology - Live in Concert (Blu-ray/DVD/2CD Box) (2021)
	Jane Relf	1969–1970	lead and backing vocals; occasional percussion	Renaissance (1969); Illusion (1971); Live+Direct (2002); Past Orbits of Dust (2012); Renaissance 50th Anniversary: Ashes Are Burning - An Anthology - Live in Concert (Blu-ray/DVD/2CD Box) (2021)
	Keith Relf	1969–1970 (died 1976)	guitar; harmonica; backing and lead vocals	Renaissance (1969); Illusion (1971); Live+Direct (2002); Past Orbits of Dust (2012); Renaissance 50th Anniversary: Ashes Are Burning - An Anthology - Live in Concert (Blu-ray/DVD/2CD Box) (2021)
	Louis Cennamo	1969–1970; 2019; 2025	bass	Renaissance (1969); Illusion (1971); Live+Direct (2002); Past Orbits of Dust (2012); Renaissance 50th Anniversary: Ashes Are Burning - An Anthology - Live in Concert (Blu-ray/DVD/2CD Box) (2021)
	Jim McCarty	1969–1970; 2019; 2025	drums; percussion; backing and occasional lead vocals	Renaissance (1969); Illusion (1971); Live+Direct (2002); Past Orbits of Dust (2012); Renaissance 50th Anniversary: Ashes Are Burning - An Anthology - Live in Concert (Blu-ray/DVD/2CD Box) (2021)
	Michael Dunford	1970–1972; 1973–1987; 1998–2002; 2009–2012 (until his death)	guitar; backing vocals	Illusion (1971) – one track only; all Renaissance releases from Ashes Are Burning (1973) to Live at the BBC: Sight & Sound (2016), except Live+Direct (2002) and Past Orbits of Dust (2012)
	Terry Slade	1970–1972	drums; percussion	Illusion (1971) – one track only
	Neil Korner	1970-71	bass	Illusion (1971) – one track only
	Terry Crowe	1970-71 (died 1999)	lead and backing vocals; occasional percussion	Illusion (1971) – one track only
	John Tout	1970–1980; 1998–1999 (died 2015)	keyboards; backing vocals	all Renaissance releases from Prologue (1972) to Azure d'Or (1979); At the Royal Albert Hall (1997); BBC Sessions (1999); Day of the Dreamer (2000); British Tour '76 (2006); Dreams & Omens (2008); DeLane Lea Studios 1973 (2015); Academy of Music 1974 (2015); Live at the BBC: Sight & Sound (2016)
	Anne-Marie "Binky" Cullom (Note: Although Cullom does not appear on any of the band's albums or compilations, she does appear on the 2010 DVD "Kings & Queens" which features the band performing five songs on a German TV program (Musik-Kanal) in 1970. Besides Cullom, the featured lineup included Dunford, Slade, Korner, Crowe and Tout.)	1970	lead and backing vocals; occasional percussion	none
	Danny McCulloch	1971 (died 2015)	bass	none
	Frank Farrell	1971 (died 1997)	bass	none
	John Wetton	1971–1972 (died 2017)	bass	Grandine il Vento (2013) – guest appearance on one track
	Jon Camp	1972–1985 (died 2024)	bass; backing and occasional lead vocals; occasional guitars	all Renaissance releases from Prologue (1972) to Day of the Dreamer (2000); British Tour '76 (2006); Dreams & Omens (2008); Live in Chicago (2010); DeLane Lea Studios 1973 (2015); Academy of Music 1974 (2015); Live at the BBC: Sight & Sound (2016)
	Ginger Dixon	1972	drums	none
	Mick Parsons	1972 (until his death)	guitar	none
	Rob Hendry	1972–1973	guitar; mandolin; backing vocals; percussion	Prologue (1972)
	Terry Sullivan	1972–1980; 1998–2002; (died 2026)	drums; percussion; backing vocals	all Renaissance releases from Prologue (1972) to Azure d'Or (1979); At the Royal Albert Hall (1997); BBC Sessions (1999); Day of the Dreamer (2000); Tuscany (2000); In the Land of the Rising Sun: Live in Japan 2001 (2002); British Tour '76 (2006); Dreams & Omens (2008); DeLane Lea Studios 1973 (2015); Academy of Music 1974 (2015); Live at the BBC: Sight & Sound (2016)
	Pete Finberg	1973	guitar	none
	Gavin Harrison	1983–1984	drums; percussion	Songs from Renaissance Days (1997); Live in Chicago (2010)
	Mike Taylor	1983–1984	keyboards	Songs from Renaissance Days (1997); Live in Chicago (2010)
	Raphael Rudd	1984–1987 (died 2002)	keyboards; harmonica	Unplugged Live at the Academy of Music, Philadelphia USA (2000)
	Greg Carter	1984–1985	drums; percussion	none
	Charles Descarfino	1985–1987; 2017–2018	percussion; drums and backing vocals (2017–2018)	Unplugged Live at the Academy of Music, Philadelphia USA (2000); A Symphonic Journey: Live in Concert (2018)
	Mickey Simmonds	1999–2002	keyboards; backing vocals	Tuscany (2000); In the Land of the Rising Sun: Live in Japan 2001 (2002)
	David J. Keyes	2001–2002; 2009–2015 (died 2019)	bass; backing and occasional lead vocals	In the Land of the Rising Sun: Live in Japan 2001 (2002); The Mystic and the Muse (2010); Tour 2011: Live in Concert (2012); Grandine il Vento (2013)
	Tom Brislin	2009–2010; 2015–2016	keyboards; backing vocals	The Mystic and the Muse (2010); Grandine il Vento (2013) – guest appearance on one track; Live at the Union Chapel (2015)
	Jason Hart	2010–2015	keyboards; accordion; backing vocals	Tour 2011: Live in Concert (2012); Grandine il Vento (2013)
	Ryche Chlanda	2013–2015	guitar; backing vocals	none
	Leo Traversa	2015–2023	bass; backing vocals	Live at the Union Chapel (2015); A Symphonic Journey: Live in Concert (2018)
	John Arbo	2018	bass; backing vocals	none

== Lineups ==
Period	Members	Studio albums	Live albums
Spring 1969 – summer 1970	Jane Relf – vocals, percussion; Keith Relf – guitar, harmonica, vocals; Louis Cennamo – bass; Jim McCarty – drums, percussion, vocals; John Hawken – keyboards, piano	Renaissance (1969); Illusion (1971)	Live+Direct (2002); Past Orbits of Dust (2012)
Summer – October 1970	Jane Relf – vocals, percussion; John Hawken – keyboards, piano; Terry Crowe – vocals, percussion; Michael Dunford – guitar, vocals; Neil Korner – bass; Terry Slade – drums, percussion	Illusion (1971) – one track only	none
October 1970 – January 1971	Terry Crowe – vocals, percussion; Michael Dunford – guitar, vocals; Neil Korner – bass; Terry Slade – drums, percussion; Binky Cullom – vocals, percussion; John Tout – keyboards, vocals	none	
January – spring 1971	Terry Crowe – vocals, percussion; Michael Dunford – guitar, vocals; Neil Korner – bass; Terry Slade – drums, percussion; John Tout – keyboards, vocals; Annie Haslam – vocals, percussion	none	
Spring 1971	Michael Dunford – guitar, vocals; Terry Slade – drums, percussion; John Tout – keyboards, vocals; Annie Haslam – vocals, percussion; Danny McCulloch – bass	none	
Spring – June 1971	Michael Dunford – guitar, vocals; Terry Slade – drums, percussion; John Tout – keyboards, vocals; Annie Haslam – vocals, percussion; Frank Farrell – bass	none	
June 1971 – early 1972	Michael Dunford – guitar, vocals; Terry Slade – drums, percussion; John Tout – keyboards, vocals; Annie Haslam – vocals, percussion; John Wetton – bass	none	
Early 1972	John Tout – keyboards, vocals; Annie Haslam – vocals, percussion; Mick Parsons – guitar; Jon Camp – bass, vocals; Ginger Dixon – drums	none	
June 1972 – early 1973	John Tout – keyboards, vocals; Annie Haslam – vocals, percussion; Jon Camp – bass, vocals; Rob Hendry – guitar, vocals; Terry Sullivan– drums, percussion, vocals	Prologue (1972)	none
Early 1973	John Tout – keyboards, vocals; Annie Haslam – vocals, percussion; Jon Camp – bass, vocals; Terry Sullivan – drums, percussion, vocals; Pete Finberg – guitar	none	
Spring 1973 – 1980	John Tout – keyboards, vocals; Annie Haslam – vocals, percussion; Jon Camp – bass, vocals; Terry Sullivan – drums, percussion, vocals; Michael Dunford – guitar, vocals	Ashes Are Burning (1973); Turn of the Cards (1974); Scheherazade and Other Stories (1975); Novella (1977); A Song for All Seasons (1978); Azure d'Or (1979)	Live at Carnegie Hall (1976); At the Royal Albert Hall (1997); Day of the Dreamer (2000); British Tour '76 (2006); Dreams & Omens (2008); Academy of Music 1974 (2015)
1980–1983	Annie Haslam – vocals, percussion; Michael Dunford – guitar, vocals; Jon Camp – bass, vocals	Camera Camera (1981); Time-Line (1983)	none
1983–1984	Annie Haslam – vocals, percussion; Michael Dunford – guitar, vocals; Jon Camp – bass, vocals; Gavin Harrison – drums, percussion; Mike Taylor – keyboards	Songs from Renaissance Days (1997)	Live in Chicago (2010)
1984–1985	Annie Haslam – vocals, percussion; Michael Dunford – guitar, vocals; Jon Camp – bass, vocals; Greg Carter – drums, percussion; Raphael Rudd – keyboards, harmonica	none	
1985–1987	Annie Haslam – vocals, percussion; Michael Dunford – guitar, vocals; Raphael Rudd – keyboards, harmonica; Mark Lambert – bass; Charles Descarfino – percussion	none	Unplugged: Live at the Academy of Music, Philadelphia USA (2000)
Band inactive 1987 – 1998
1998–1999	Annie Haslam – vocals, percussion; Michael Dunford – guitar, vocals; Terry Sullivan – drums, percussion, vocals; John Tout – keyboards, vocals	Tuscany (2000) – two tracks only	none
1999–2001	Annie Haslam – lead vocals, percussion; Michael Dunford – guitar, vocals; Terry Sullivan – drums, percussion, vocals; Mickey Simmonds – keyboards, vocals	Tuscany (2000)	none
2001–2002	Annie Haslam – lead vocals, percussion; Michael Dunford – guitar, vocals; Terry Sullivan – drums, percussion, vocals; Mickey Simmonds – keyboards, vocals; David J. Keyes – bass, vocals; Rave Tesar – piano, keyboards	none	In the Land of the Rising Sun: Live in Japan 2001 (2002)
Band inactive 2002 – 2009
August 2009 – October 2010	Annie Haslam – lead vocals, percussion; Michael Dunford – guitar, vocals; David J. Keyes – bass, vocals; Rave Tesar – piano, keyboards; Frank Pagano – drums, percussion, vocals; Tom Brislin – keyboards, vocals	The Mystic and the Muse EP (2010)	none
October 2010 – November 2012	Annie Haslam – lead vocals, percussion; Michael Dunford – guitar, vocals; David J. Keyes – bass, vocals; Rave Tesar – piano, keyboards; Frank Pagano – drums, percussion, vocals; Jason Hart – keyboards, vocals	Grandine il vento (2013)	Tour 2011: Turn of the Cards Scheherazade and Other Stories Live in Concert (2012)
February 2013 – spring 2015	Annie Haslam – lead vocals, percussion; David J. Keyes – bass, vocals; Rave Tesar – piano, keyboards; Frank Pagano – drums, percussion, vocals; Jason Hart – keyboards, vocals; Ryche Chlanda – guitar, vocals	none	
Spring 2015 – spring 2016	Annie Haslam – lead vocals, percussion; Rave Tesar – piano, keyboards; Frank Pagano – drums, percussion, vocals; Mark Lambert – guitar, vocals; Leo Traversa – bass, vocals; Tom Brislin – keyboards, vocals	none	Live at the Union Chapel (2015)
Spring 2016 – late 2017	Annie Haslam – lead vocals, percussion; Rave Tesar – piano, keyboards; Frank Pagano – drums, percussion, vocals; Mark Lambert – guitar, vocals; Leo Traversa – bass, vocals; Geoffrey Langley – keyboards, vocals	none	
Late 2017 – mid-2018	Annie Haslam – lead vocals, percussion; Rave Tesar – piano, keyboards; Charles Descarfino – drums, percussion, vocals; Mark Lambert – guitar, vocals; Leo Traversa – bass, vocals; Geoffrey Langley – keyboards, vocals	none	A Symphonic Journey: Live in Concert (2018)
Late 2018 – present	Annie Haslam – lead vocals, percussion; Rave Tesar – piano, keyboards; Mark Lambert – guitar, vocals; Geoffrey Langley – keyboards, vocals; John Arbo – bass, vocals; Frank Pagano – drums, percussion, vocals	none	
