= Armageddon (Armageddon album) =

Studio album by Armageddon
- Released: July 1975
- Recorded: Autumn 1974
- Studio: Olympic Studios, Barnes
- Genre: Hard rock, heavy metal, progressive rock
- Length: 41:02
- Label: A&M SP-4513 (original vinyl); Repertoire PMS-7089-WP (1998 CD reissue); Esoteric ECLEC2150 (2009 CD reissue)
- Producer: Armageddon

Professional ratings
Review scores
Source	Rating
AllMusic	4.5/5 stars

Armageddon was the only album released by British/American progressive rock group Armageddon in 1975. It features vocalist Keith Relf (of The Yardbirds and Renaissance), Martin Pugh (lead guitarist for Rod Stewart's An Old Raincoat Won't Ever Let You Down and Steamhammer), Louis Cennamo (bassist and bandmate of Relf's in Renaissance and Pugh's in Steamhammer), and Bobby Caldwell (drummer for Captain Beyond and Johnny Winter).

== History ==
Armageddon was the last band to feature The Yardbirds' (the band that launched Eric Clapton, Jeff Beck and Jimmy Page) vocalist Keith Relf. He had founded Renaissance after the dissolution of The Yardbirds in 1968, and left Renaissance after two albums (actually half way through the second album) - to produce bands like Medicine Head (for whom he also played bass), Hunter Muskett and Saturnalia.

Pugh and Cennamo had broken up Steamhammer in 1973 - they then decided, with Relf (who had assisted them in the production of the final Steamhammer LP), to leave England for L.A. They tried out a few drummers in California, and decided upon drummer Bobby Caldwell to complete the Armageddon lineup.

According to the booklet in the Repertoire Records CD reissue of the album in 2001, Frampton and Dee Anthony recommended Armageddon to A&M Records, and it is likely that because he was their top selling artist at the time, they agreed to sign the band.

Although the group's self-titled album was well received by critics and fans, the band did not tour to support it - consequently, sales suffered, and Relf returned to England due to poor health shortly after the album was released. He died shortly after returning to England, when he was electrocuted while playing guitar, although he did record one more song "All the Falling Angels" that is included on an album by Illusion called Enchanted Caress. (Illusion was the name the original members of Renaissance chose when they reunited, as the Annie Haslam incarnation of that band was still active at that time). After Armageddon folded, bassist Cennamo reunited with his Renaissance bandmates (the aforementioned Illusion), and later worked with Jim McCarty in the bands "Stairway" and "Renaissance Illusion". Drummer Caldwell returned to Captain Beyond for an album and tour - and although guitarist Pugh appears to have retired from music after 1975, he did emerge to play guitar on sessions alongside legendary American rock guitarist Geoff Thorpe (of Vicious Rumors) in American rock and roll band, 7th Order on their debut CD, The Lake of Memory, released on the Big Island Sounds label in 2007.

== Track listing ==
Armageddon
No.	Title	Writer(s)	Length
1.	"Buzzard"	Caldwell, Pugh, Relf	8:16
2.	"Silver Tightrope"	Caldwell, Pugh, Relf	8:23
3.	"Paths and Planes and Future Gains"	Caldwell, Pugh, Relf	4:30
4.	"Last Stand Before"	Caldwell, Cennamo, Pugh, Relf	8:23
5.	"Basking in the White of the Midnight Sun: a) Warning Coming On - (1:00); b) Basking in the White of the Midnight Sun (3:03); c) Brother Ego - (5:10); d) Basking in the White of the Midnight Sun (Reprise) - (2:18)"	Caldwell, Pugh, Relf	11:30

== Personnel ==
Armageddon

- Keith Relf - lead vocals, harmonica
- Martin Pugh - electric and acoustic guitars
- Louis Cennamo - bass, electric bowed bass
- Bobby Caldwell - drums, percussion, piano, backing vocals
