= Alan Clayson =

British singer (born 1951)

Alan Clayson (born 3 May 1951, Dover, Kent) is an English singer-songwriter, author and music journalist. He gained popularity in the late 1970s as leader of the band Clayson and the Argonauts. In addition to contributing to publications such as Record Collector, Mojo and Folk Roots, he subsequently established himself as a prolific writer of music biographies. Among his many books are Backbeat, which details the Beatles' early career in Germany, Ringo Starr: Straight Man or Joker?, and biographies of Jacques Brel, the Yardbirds, Serge Gainsbourg and Edgard Varèse. Clayson has also contributed to The Guardian, The Sunday Times, The Independent and Rock 'n' Reel.

== Career ==
=== As a musician ===
According to Clayson, his first band was Ace and the Crescents, which he formed in the mid-1960s with fellow students from "a truly desperate grammar school for boys near Aldershot [in Hampshire]". He recalls visiting the Beatles' Apple Corps headquarters in 1968, in an unsuccessful attempt to have Apple publish his poetry. Inspired in part by Frank Zappa's work as an artist and performer, he formed Clayson and the Argonauts in the late 1970s. The band received some highly favourable reviews in the UK music press, attaining what Melody Maker termed "a premier position on rock's Lunatic Fringe", yet only achieved minor commercial success in Northern Europe.

Following the disbandment of the Argonauts in 1986, Clayson continued as a recording artist and solo performer. The Village Voice described his act as "more than just a performance; an experience". Since 2011, he has presented a show titled Clayson Sings Chanson.

Clayson's songs have been covered by Dave Berry (in whose backing group Clayson played keyboards in the mid-1980s), Stairway and Jane Relf. He has also worked with the Portsmouth Sinfonia, Wreckless Eric, Jim McCarty, Dick Taylor and Screaming Lord Sutch, among others.

In 2005, Clayson and the Argonauts re-formed. In 2017, they released the album This Cannot Go On ... Ancient And Modern: Highlights Of Half-A-Century, a CD retrospective attributed to Clayson alone, was issued in 2024, and There's Still Time in 2026.

=== As journalist and author ===
Having contributed to Schoolkids OZ during his adolescence, Clayson went on to write regularly for a wide range of publications, including Record Collector, Mojo, The Guardian, The Independent, Folk Roots and Mediaeval World. His work has also appeared in Hello!, The Sunday Times, The Daily Telegraph and Ugly Things.

As a pop music historian, Clayson has written over thirty books. The English newspaper Western Morning News once labelled him "the AJP Taylor of pop", with reference to the historian of twentieth-century European politics. Clayson's bestsellers include Backbeat (subsequently made into a film by director Iain Softley); Beat Merchants; and an authorised biography of the Yardbirds.

In addition to Backbeat, he has written books on each of the four Beatles, beginning with the 1990 publication of The Quiet One: A Life of George Harrison. The four titles were re-released as a box set in 2003 by Sanctuary Publishing. Clayson's volume on Ringo Starr, subtitled Straight Man or Joker?, remains a rare work dedicated to the drummer's career. In his overview of the most popular Beatles books, for Rough Guides, Chris Ingham writes that the four volumes "have been described as Beatles-flavoured teabags in a cup full of Clayson", due to the author's tendency to refer to his own musical career and insert his "harmless prejudices" in the narrative. Ingham concedes, however, that "as a second-generation veteran of the British beat scene, [Clayson's] point of view usually contains a certain authenticity and authority."

Clayson has also written English-language studies of the French singer and actor Serge Gainsbourg, French composer Edgard Varèse and Belgian chansonnier Jacques Brel. His other subjects include Led Zeppelin, Mick Jagger, Brian Jones, Charlie Watts, Keith Richards, Keith Moon, Roy Orbison, Yoko Ono and the Troggs.

Aside from his writing on popular music, Clayson has presented radio programs and lectured on music in Britain and the United States. He has also contributed liner notes and commentary to CD and DVD releases by artists such as Elvis Presley, the Rolling Stones, Édith Piaf, Peter Frampton, Matt Monro, Buddy Holly, Jimi Hendrix, Steve Harley, the Animals and Mungo Jerry.
