= 7th Order =

American rock & roll band

- 7th Order "The Initiate's Journey, 2003-13"

Background information
- Origin: United States
- Genres: Rock and roll, blues rock, progressive rock, indie rock
- Years active: 2001–present
- Label: Big Island Sounds
- Website: 7thorder.com

7th Order is an American rock & roll band whose debut extended play CD release, The Lake of Memory, was issued on the Big Island Sounds label in 2007 (although 7th Order had been in existence for several years by that time). The band is led by vocalist, guitarist and main songwriter Daniel Jones and is notable for having been assisted by veteran British guitarist Martin Pugh (of Steamhammer, Armageddon and "The Rod Stewart Album"), drummer Tim Kelliher, (of Randy Hansen's Machine Gun), and guitarist Geoff Thorpe (of Vicious Rumors). Reviewers have recognized their particular sound as reminiscent of blues-rock bands like The Rolling Stones and The Yardbirds, with progressive undertones ala Led Zeppelin.

As of October 16, 2015 – 7th Order was the number one Rock & Roll artist for the State of Hawaii on the Reverb Nation web site.

== History ==
7th Order's pre-history began in Hawaii, on the Honolulu rock & roll club scene. Jones (who was born in Page, Arizona and spent the early part of his childhood in Fresno, California) and Thorpe (who was born and spent the early part of his childhood in Los Angeles, California) had met in a Honolulu elementary school in the 1960s, where they developed an interest in the rock & roll music of the era. After spending some time in the late 70's on the local club circuit, they separately undertook music careers that eventually took them to various parts of North America (and in Thorpe's case, resulted in significant worldwide success with his band, Vicious Rumors).

7th Order later evolved from studio sessions Jones had organized in California/Washington beginning in the 1990s. In various radio interviews, Jones has identified the band's musical influences to be the blues/rock and roll innovators of the 1950s and 1960s. In one particular interview on the Netherlands' Radio Heemskerk, in August 2003, Jones discussed spending several years playing in various bands around the US, prior to 7th Order's formation, and having crossed paths with established members of the rock and roll scene like Jesse Ed Davis, Randy California, Mick Taylor, B.B. King, Peter Green, Stevie Ray Vaughan, Roger McGuinn, Eric Clapton and others. With Jones acting as band leader, songwriter, and producer – Thorpe and Pugh flew in from California to help out with the very first 7th Order demo recording sessions in Seattle, WA. in December 2001 (and were possibly considered band members during the early stages of the band's development).

== The Lake of Memory, Road to Yerevan and Voyager ==
While 7th Order had received worldwide recognition via radio and TV exposure since their August 2003 radio debut (on "The Mickster's Dangerous Rock & Roll Show" on WNTI-FM in Hackettstown, NJ), their progress may have been impacted by several non-band related matters. Jones once commented in a radio interview: "My 23 year old son passed away in November of 2004...and that is something you don't just bounce back from in a few weeks. I then returned to Hawaii, and the band was just going to have to wait until I could deal with a few things". Consequently, 7th Order appears to have then decided to delay release of their debut CD, The Lake of Memory (the title song reportedly having been inspired by the writings of Austrian philosopher Rudolf Steiner), but they also had to withstand yet another tragic setback when their management consultant and longtime friend, Steven B. Williams, was murdered on a boat off of Santa Catalina Island, California in May 2006 (Williams had previously been a successful rock radio DJ on stations such as Denver's KBPI and Honolulu's KIKI (AM)) – the CD release eventually took place in October 2007. The one constant, as far as personnel was concerned, was Jones (who wrote and sang all of the band's material) – with guests Pugh and Thorpe on guitars & bass, Tim Kelliher on drums, and various session players.

Upon having changed their home base to the Hawaiian Islands, the band has shown some interest in supporting benefits and community causes. A broadcast in May 2009 originating from KKCR radio on the Hawaiian island of Kauai featured several station ID promos (done by band founder Jones, who was introduced as "...of 7th Order"), recorded for one of the station's yearly "fund drives". Members also autographed and donated copies of The Lake of Memory CD for attendees of a benefit motorcycle run for Aseltine School, a school that "helps meet the educational needs of emotionally disturbed and learning disabled students from throughout San Diego County" in San Diego, California – held on July 22, 2011. Additionally, after the death of guitarist Ronnie Montrose in 2012, the 7th Order home page encouraged fans to support the "Concert For Ronnie Montrose" – a memorial concert event (featuring a re-formed Montrose) held at The Grand Ballroom at the Regency Center, San Francisco, CA, USA on April 27, 2012. The band has also recently posted on Facebook that they are releasing their own tribute to guitarist Montrose, a cover of a song titled "Voyager" (written by Montrose and vocalist Davey Pattison) – to benefit Sweet Relief Musicians Fund.

The title track from the second 7th Order "extended play" CD single release, 2011's Road to Yerevan (a band original written by Jones/Pugh), was played and discussed extensively on radio shows on RTRFM in Perth, Australia:, CKWR in Ontario, Canada, FM 93.8 in Johannesburg, South Africa and WNTI-FM in Hackettstown, NJ (US).

== Current activities ==
The ASCAP database may show evidence of what the future may hold for the band, as it lists several Jones compositions that are not on any 7th Order CDs. It therefore seems possible that these previously unknown songs may be destined for a future 7th Order release (as mentioned on DJ Stan Hilborn's show on CKWR Radio in March 2012).

In May 2015, the 7th Order web site announced a new compilation/career retrospective "mixed media" CD (audio and video) release titled The Initiate's Journey, 2003–13, which has been available worldwide since June 2015. The new CD subsequently received regular airplay on numerous radio stations around the world, including Radio Italia (Milan, Italy), KKUP Radio (Cupertino, California), KWTF 88.1 FM in Bodega Bay, California, WPIR at Pratt Institute in Brooklyn, NY, WVPH 90.3 in Piscataway, New Jersey, Channel Radio (Kent, England) and Radio Marabu (Berlin, Germany).

On December 17, 2016, the "Adventures in Plasticland" radio show on 98.5 CKWR-FM in Ontario, Canada featured a 7th Order 15th anniversary special, that included an interview as well as an airing of the band's first ever demo recording session in Seattle, December 2001. The press release on 7th Order's Facebook page stated that this would be a one time only opportunity for followers of the band to hear these sessions.

During the last week of September 2017, 7th Order's Facebook, Instagram and Twitter pages began announcing that the band would be acknowledging the 10th anniversary of the release of their "The Lake of Memory" CD (which was released on October 1, 2007) by temporarily posting a downloadable, free version of the entire CD (with a bonus track, a studio outtake of the 7th Order song "Lazarus") – available from their Facebook page.

On a radio broadcast on Nyack College's WNYK Radio in Nyack, New York in December 2017, the announcer stated that new music from 7th Order was being worked on for a 2019 release. New music from the band was also discussed in an interview with band leader Jones in an interview on England's Channel 1 Radio on February 3, 2018.

== The Volcano Chronicles radio show ==
On October 8, 2019, the band posted an announcement about new personnel on their Facebook page, and referenced delays in getting new music out due in part to the 2018 lower Puna eruption near their homes on the Big Island of Hawaii – as well as issues with their performing rights organization, ASCAP. Other Social Media posts in 2019 and 2020 on the band's pages indicate that band leader Jones has been hosting a weekly Rock and Roll radio show called "The Volcano Chronicles" (which has on occasion featured special guests like Charlie Musselwhite, Jon Anderson of Yes, Gene Parsons, Linda Gail Lewis, Deborah Bonham, Richie Furay, Rick Wakeman, Fito de la Parra of Canned Heat, Dave Mason, Jim McCarty of The Yardbirds and other well known artists) on KNKR 96.1 FM on the Big Island of Hawaii. – in addition to his having done some production work with well known British bassist Louis Cennamo (of The Herd, Renaissance, Colosseum, Steamhammer, Armageddon, Illusion).

== Discography ==
The Lake of Memory (EP)

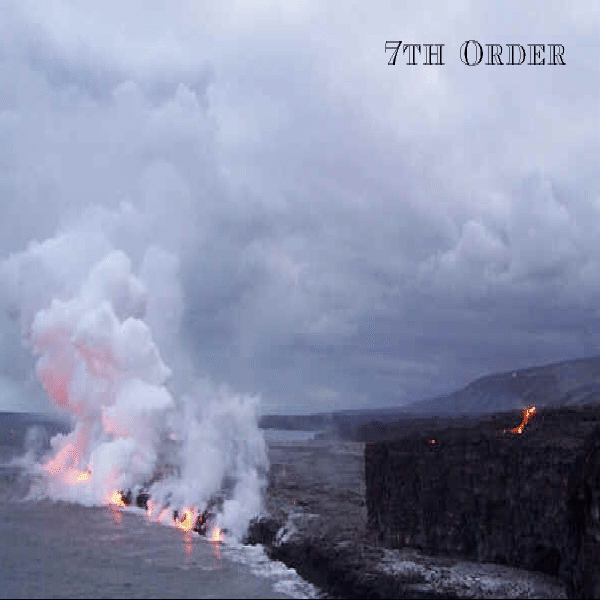
7th Order: "The Lake of Memory" CD

1. "The Lake of Memory" – 7:38
2. "Lazarus" – 4:48
3. "Force of Nature Comes Down" – 3:40
- All titles: (Jones) 2003-05©7th Order Songs ASCAP
- Produced by 7th Order, assisted by Martin Pugh and Geoff Thorpe
- A "limited edition" release (only 300 copies pressed)
- 2007℗Big Island Sounds

Road to Yerevan (EP)

7th Order: "Road to Yerevan" CD

1. "Road to Yerevan" (Jones, Pugh) – 8:08
2. "Powderkeg" (Jones) – 3:15
3. "Live Acoustic Medley" – 2:58
- Produced by 7th Order, assisted by Martin Pugh
- 2011℗Big Island Sounds

The Initiate's Journey, 2003–13 (career retrospective, enhanced "mixed media" CD)

1. "Force of Nature Comes Down" (Jones) (Orig. Studio Mix) 3:43
2. "Lazarus" (Jones) (Orig. Studio Mix) 4:52
3. "Hats Off" (Pugh, 7th Order) (Studio Outtake) 4:34
4. "The Lake of Memory" (Jones) (Alternate Mix) 7:39
5. "Throwing Fate The Slip" (Jones) (Studio Outtake) 2:39
6. "Powderkeg" (Jones) 3:12
7. "Road to Yerevan" (Pugh, Jones) 8:08
8. "100 Year Rain" (Jones) (live) 2:30
- Produced by 7th Order, assisted by Martin Pugh and Geoff Thorpe
- 2015℗Big Island Sounds
