= Illusion (Renaissance album) =

Studio album by Renaissance
- Released: 1971
- Recorded: Spring/Summer 1970
- Studio: Olympic, London; Island, London
- Genre: Progressive rock
- Length: 42:31
- Label: Island
- Producer: Keith Relf

Renaissance chronology
Renaissance (1969)	Illusion (1971)	Prologue (1972)

Original UK release cover

Illusion is the second studio album by the English progressive rock band Renaissance, released in 1971. A series of lineup changes began during the recording sessions, leading to Illusion being the final Renaissance album by the original lineup, and ultimately to a completely different lineup emerging by the time of their next album, Prologue. However, the original lineup later reunited and recorded a series of albums under the band name Illusion. Illusion was originally released only in Germany and did not receive a wider release until 1973. It was first released in the UK in 1977, with a cover that had the original front and rear cover artwork swapped.

== Background and recording ==
Following European and American tours to support their first album, Renaissance turned to writing material for a second album, and returned to the studio in May 1970 to record it. Illusion was the first Renaissance album to feature lyrics by Betty Thatcher, who would work with the band until 1981. Thatcher was brought to the band by her friend Jane Relf at the suggestion of Renaissance's drummer/vocalist Jim McCarty, who was experiencing difficulty writing lyrics for himself. Though Paul Samwell-Smith had produced the first album, Renaissance's guitarist/vocalist Keith Relf opted to produce Illusion himself. Samwell-Smith publicly expressed bitterness at this, since in addition to producing the first album he had handled much of the business dealings that allowed it to be recorded and released.

The band recorded "Love Goes On", "Golden Thread", "Love Is All", and "Face of Yesterday" in between continued extensive touring in both the UK and mainland Europe, a schedule that was so physically taxing that McCarty became ill while on the road, leading him to announce in July 1970 that he was leaving Renaissance in order to focus exclusively on songwriting. Keith Relf was not immune to the stresses and personal conflicts of the band's nonstop schedule, and with McCarty gone, he shortly after announced that he was quitting Renaissance as well, though he continued to be present for the recording sessions in his capacity as producer. John Hawken recruited singer Terry Crowe and guitarist Michael Dunford (both from Hawken's previous band The Nashville Teens), as well as session drummer Terry Slade to replace Relf and McCarty. Louis Cennamo nonetheless was skeptical of the band's future in the light of the departure of both their primary songwriters, so when the band Colosseum contacted him with an invitation to become their new bassist, he accepted. Bassist Neil Korner, another former member of The Nashville Teens, replaced him.

This new six-person line-up recorded a Dunford composition, "Mr. Pine". However, due to a lack of material for the album, the original line-up reassembled, minus Hawken and plus guest keyboardist Don Shinn, to record "Past Orbits of Dust".

"Mr. Pine" is the only track on a Renaissance album where members of the original line-up (John Hawken, Jane Relf) are heard together with a member of the classic line-up (Michael Dunford). It includes a theme that was later used in the Renaissance song "Running Hard" (from Turn of the Cards, 1974).

One track recorded during the Illusion sessions, a fairly short song called "Statues", was not used on the album. It was eventually released in 2002 on the album Live + Direct. The original album was reissued on CD in 1995 by Repertoire Records.

== Reception ==
Professional ratings
Review scores
Source	Rating
AllMusic	3/5 stars

Allmusic's retrospective review described Illusion as "a much less bold, more smoothly commercial album" than Renaissance's self-titled debut, as well as being lighter and more acoustically driven, and concluded it would appeal more to fans of the Renaissance lineup that came after than to those who liked the debut album.

== Aftermath ==
Shortly after recording was complete, the new six-piece lineup of Renaissance (John Hawken, Jane Relf, Terry Crowe, Michael Dunford, Neil Korner, and Terry Slade) went on a European tour to promote Illusion, at the end of which Relf left the band. She later explained, "We were playing a horrible festival somewhere and I realized that I was just with a bunch of people who happened to be on a stage together at the same time. Being in a band should feel like being part of a family and that feeling wasn't there for me as I had no connection with them, so I left soon after." She was replaced by Anne-Marie "Binky" Cullom, but by Fall 1970 the only remaining original member, John Hawken, had left Renaissance to join Spooky Tooth.

When the five members of the original Renaissance reunited in 1976, the Renaissance name was still being used by their successors in the band. Henceforth they named the reformed band "Illusion", alluding to the album they had recorded as the previous group. They recorded a series of demos prior to Keith Relf's death on 14 May 1976, one of which "All the Final Angels", was released as a bonus track on a reissue of Renaissance's debut album under the title Innocence, and later as a bonus track on CD issues of Illusion. The surviving members resolved to continue without Keith Relf, and their first album under the new band name, entitled Out of the Mist, included a reworking of the song "Face of Yesterday". Their second album was eponymously titled Illusion.

== Track listing ==
Songwriting credits per the 2010 CD issue on Esoteric Recordings; the original issue on Island Records credits songwriters by last name only, and so does not differentiate between Keith and Jane Relf. Songwriting credits are otherwise consistent between the two releases.

Side one
No.	Title	Writer(s)	Lead vocals	Length
1.	"Love Goes On"	Keith and Jane Relf	Jane Relf	2:51
2.	"Golden Thread"	Jim McCarty, K. Relf	Jim McCarty and Jane Relf	8:15
3.	"Love Is All"	McCarty, Betty Thatcher	Keith Relf	3:40
4.	"Mr. Pine"	Michael Dunford	Terry Crowe	7:00

Side two
No.	Title	Writer(s)	Lead vocals	Length
5.	"Face of Yesterday"	McCarty	Jane Relf	6:06
6.	"Past Orbits of Dust"	K. Relf, McCarty, Thatcher	Jane and Keith Relf	14:39

== Personnel ==
=== Renaissance ===
- Jane Relf – vocals (1–6), percussion (1–6)
- John Hawken – keyboards (1–5)
- Keith Relf – guitars (1–3, 5, 6), vocals (1–3, 5, 6)
- Louis Cennamo – bass (1–3, 5, 6)
- Jim McCarty – drums (1–3, 5, 6), vocals (1–3, 5, 6), percussion (1–3, 5, 6)
- Terry Crowe – vocals (4)
- Michael Dunford – guitars (4)
- Neil Korner – bass (4)
- Terry Slade – drums, percussion (4)

=== Additional musician ===
- Don Shinn – keyboards (6)

=== Production ===
- Keith Relf – producer
- Andy Johns, Phil Ault – engineers
