= Armageddon (British band) =

English hard rock band

- Origin: England
- Genres: Hard rock, progressive rock, heavy metal
- Years active: 1974–1976
- Label: A&M
- Spinoff of: The Yardbirds; Renaissance; Steamhammer; Captain Beyond
- Past members: Bobby Caldwell; Louis Cennamo; Martin Pugh; Keith Relf

Armageddon were an English hard rock band formed in 1974. Their self-titled debut, Armageddon, was recorded in England and released in the United States on A&M Records. The albums' original liner notes use the term "supergroup", as their personnel were drummer Bobby Caldwell (previously a member of Captain Beyond), singer Keith Relf (who had fronted the band the Yardbirds and was a co-founder of Renaissance), guitarist Martin Pugh (from Steamhammer), and bassist Louis Cennamo (also formerly of Renaissance and Steamhammer).

== History ==
Keith Relf had helped with post production of the final Steamhammer LP, Speech, in 1971/72. Steamhammer's dissolution took place the same year of the album's release, as they had undergone numerous personnel changes since their inception, not the least of which was the death of drummer Mick Bradley in February 1972. The remaining Steamhammer alumni, Pugh and Cennamo, shared a flat and were asked by Keith Relf to move to Los Angeles with him early in 1974 with a view of forming a new band. They set out to recruit a drummer and happened across Bobby Caldwell (who had also been suggested to the band by Aynsley Dunbar) at The Rainbow in Hollywood; they began rehearsing together in late 1974/early 1975. Cennamo's old friend, Peter Frampton, was also now in Los Angeles and helped them to make contact with his management and record label.

Armageddon was managed initially by Dee Anthony (Peter Frampton, Humble Pie, and Emerson, Lake & Palmer) and later Jerry Weintraub (Frank Sinatra, Bob Dylan), but the band never toured (a July 1975 tour supporting Eric Clapton was announced and promoted, but cancelled at the last minute) so it is likely they were negatively impacted by the consequent reduced exposure level and record sales.

=== Break-up ===
In a 2001 interview, drummer Caldwell mentioned that the band's management became increasingly more difficult to communicate with; consequently they were not being promoted properly. Bassist Cennamo stated in liner notes of the CD re-release of the album on the Repertoire label in 1999 that Caldwell and Pugh's drug problems (heroin) had created difficulties within the band, which ran at cross purposes with the fact that the record received good reviews and significant FM radio attention, and was selling reasonably well. Cennamo also states that Relf's long-time asthma problems were turning into emphysema (making it increasingly hard for Relf to draw air into his lungs to sing), and the band had dissolved many months prior to the sudden death of Keith Relf in May 1976.

=== Post-Armageddon ===
After Armageddon folded, Relf and Cennamo reunited with their Renaissance bandmates under the name Illusion, and Cennamo worked with Jim McCarty in the bands Stairway and Renaissance Illusion. Caldwell returned to Captain Beyond for an album and tour.

There was an attempt in the 1980s by Pugh and Caldwell to re-form the band, as they had secured some interest from Capitol Records — vocalist Jeff Fenholt was auditioned for the band, but was eventually found to be musically unsuitable. Further auditions did not result in an acceptable replacement, and the idea to reform was shelved. Apart from that, Pugh appears to have retired from music after 1975, though he did emerge to play guitar on sessions alongside American rock guitarist Geoff Thorpe of Vicious Rumors in American band 7th Order on their debut CD, The Lake of Memory, released on the Big Island Sounds label in 2007.

== Discography ==
- Armageddon - A&M Records, 1975
