= Torment =

Torment may refer to:

- The feeling of pain or suffering
- Causing to suffer, torture

== Films ==
- Torment (1924 film), a silent crime-drama
- Torment (1944 film) (Hets), a Swedish film
- Torment (1950 British film), a British thriller film
- Torment (1950 Italian film), an Italian drama film
- Torment (1986 film), an American horror film
- Torment (1994 film), or Hell, French drama film
- Torment (2013 film), a Canadian horror film

== Novels ==
- Torment (1951), title of the republished novel Better Angel (1933)
- Torment (novel) (2010), by Lauren Kate
- Torment, a 1999 novel set in the Planescape realm of Dungeons & Dragons

== Albums ==
- Torment (Six Feet Under album), 2017
- Torment (Zoogz Rift album), 1989
- The Torment, a 1990 album by Seventh Angel

== Other ==
- Planescape: Torment, a 1999 computer role-playing game
- Torment: Tides of Numenera, a 2017 computer role-playing video game
- Mount Torment, in the U.S. state of Washington
- Torment (comics), storyline for Peter Parker: Spider-Man
- Torment (Magic: The Gathering) (2002), set of cards in the card game Magic: The Gathering

== See also ==
- Tormento (disambiguation)
- Tormentor (disambiguation)
