= Seventh Angel =

British metal band

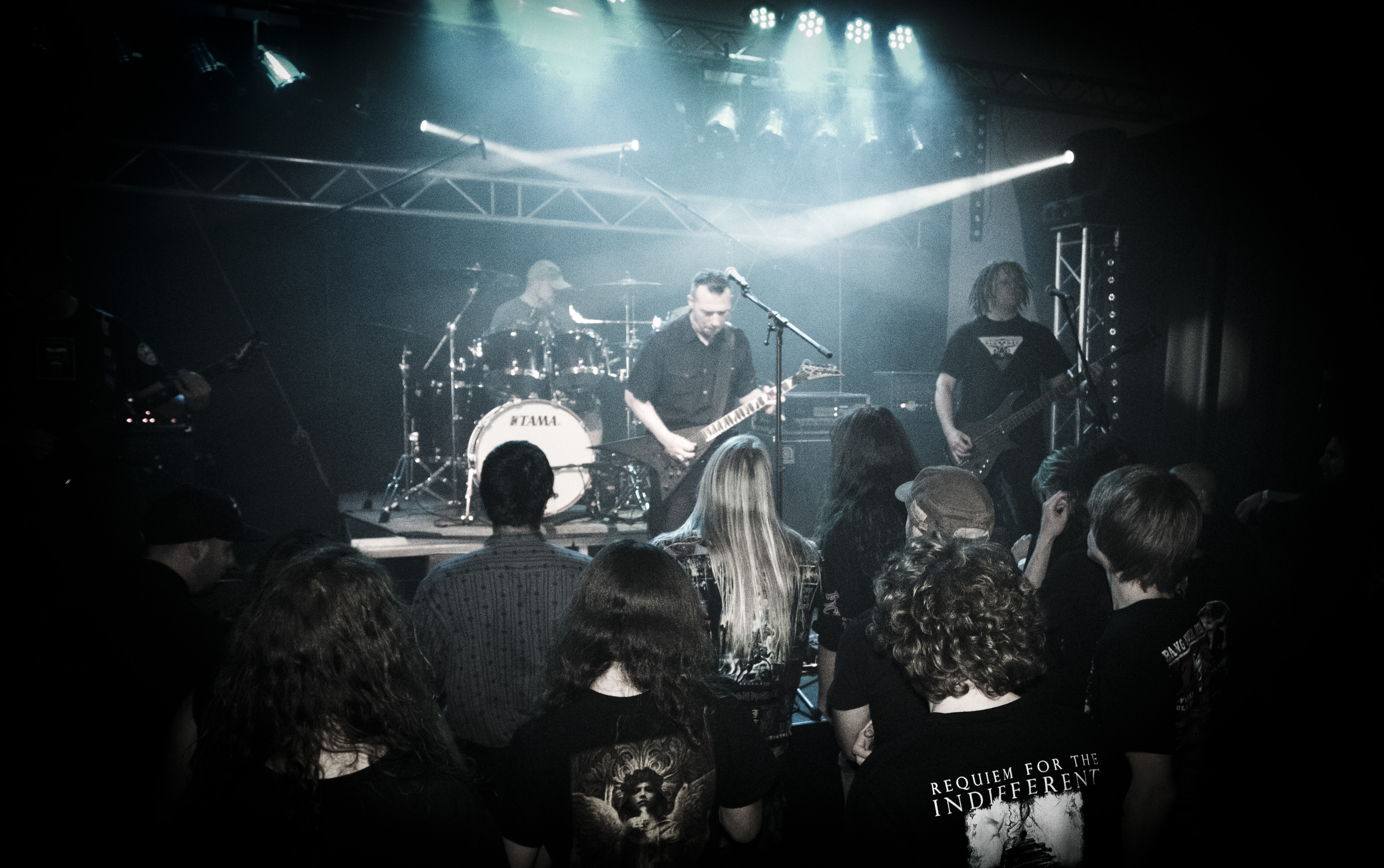
- Seventh Angel at Blast of Eternity 2012

Background information
- Origin: Halesowen, West Midlands, England
- Genres: Christian metal, death metal, doom metal, thrash metal
- Years active: 1987–1993, 2008–present
- Labels: Bombworks Records; Under One Flag / Music For Nations
- Members: Ian Arkley; Andrew "Tank" Thompson; Simon Bibby; Mark Broomhead

Seventh Angel are an English former Christian metal band formed in 1987 in Halesowen, West Midlands. The band was known for combining doom metal and thrash metal. The band released two albums, The Torment (1990) and Lament for the Weary (1992), before disbanding. Music for Nations distributed these records, making Seventh Angel label mates with Metallica, Slayer and Megadeth. The Daily Telegraph called Seventh Angel "one of the leading Christian thrash metal bands in Great Britain."

The band headlined the Metal Meltdown festival in 1990, played concerts in Germany and the Netherlands, and were featured on Channel 4 and BBC TV for several live performances of their Greenbelt Festival concerts. Guitarist/vocalist Ian Arkley later formed doom metal bands Ashen Mortality and My Silent Wake. In May 2008, the group reformed. The current line-up consists of original members Ian Arkley (guitars, vocals), Simon Bibby (guitar), Andrew "Tank" Thompson (drums) and Mark Broomhead (bass). The band released their third album, The Dust of Years, in 2009.

== History ==
=== Demo era (1987–1989) ===
Seventh Angel was formed in 1987 by Ian Arkley and Andrew (Andi) Blount with Scott Rawson joining very soon afterwards. In August 1988, the first drummer Andrew Blount left to start college and was replaced by Andy Hopkins who played with the band until December. Stuart Benton was trialled as the vocalist for a brief period in 1988.

In early 1989, Mark Ruff joined the band as their drummer. Seventh Angel's self-titled demo, sometimes referred to as the "Red" demo, was produced in 1989 with Ian playing lead guitar, bass (as Neil A Kray) as well as vocals. A few days later, Simon Bibby joined as the bassist and the band began to play local concerts around the West Midlands. The band played its first concert in May 1989 in Netherton, West Midlands.

In August 1989, Seventh Angel performed their fifth concert at the Greenbelt Festival, supporting American rock band One Bad Pig. Afterwards, Mark Ruff left and Seventh Angel toured the United Kingdom, including Ireland, with the American Christian metal band Whitecross. Colin Brookes played drums during the tour. Andrew "Tank" Thompson replaced Colin on drums. Seventh Angel's second demo, The Rehearsal Demo, was recorded whilst Scott Rawson had a short break away from the band.

=== Channel 4, The Daily Telegraph and The Torment (1990) ===
On 25 January 1990, Seventh Angel appeared on Channel 4's Not on Sunday programme which featured a performance of "Divine Takeover" and a band interview with Brian Redhead. Later that year, The Daily Telegraph described Seventh Angel as "one of Britain's leading Christian thrash metal bands." The demos received positive reviews in various magazines.

On 14 February, Ian Arkley and Simon Bibby were involved in a car crash in which Bibby broke his arm and Ian damaged several of his teeth. However, the band was able to play their confirmed concerts. Simon took over on vocal duties and Scott played bass for the gig following the accident.

Between 12 and 14 March 1990, the third demo titled Heed the Warning was recorded and mixed at White Rabbit Studios in Bridgnorth with Paul Hodson. Afterwards, the band recorded their debut album entitled The Torment at Mad Hat Studios in Wolverhampton by the same producer; the album was released that year. The British fantasy artist Rodney Matthews painted the cover painting for the album.

Over the next few months, Seventh Angel played at local venues around Dudley and Stourbridge, including five performances at The Rock Tavern in Brierley Hill. The band headlined Metal meltdown in November, which was Simon Bibby's last concert as he left the band in February. The band also contributed to the Just Be Sure It's Pure split EP in 1990 with American Christian metal bands Bride, Seraiah and Xalt, German Christian metal band Creed, and Jeff Scheetz.

=== BBCTV and Lament for the Weary (1991–1992) ===
In February, Seventh Angel appeared on BBC TV four times with footage recorded at their Greenbelt festival concert; "Forbidden Desires" was the featured song.

Simon Jones joined in to play bass and Seventh Angel performed concerts around Horsham and Stourbridge during the spring. The band played festivals including Harry and Crossfire. Seventh Angel toured the UK with Toranaga from 21 March to 7 April, playing eleven concerts.

Seventh Angel's second album, Lament for the Weary, was recorded in ICC studios, Eastbourne, with Roy Rowland from 4 to 16 July 1991; it was released in 1992. The album saw the band combine doom metal elements with progressive thrash metal. The album received positive reviews. The band contributed to a second split EP, White Metal Warriors – Last Ship Home in 1991 with the bands Detritus, Lazarus, Maverick and Stairway.

Seventh Angel performed on the mainstage of the Greenbelt festival on 23 August, sharing the stage with the American progressive metal group Galactic Cowboys. In October 1991, after a concert in Croydon, Scott left the band, as did Simon Jones after the Greenbelt festival concert. The band continued with only Tank and Ian Arkley as permanent members.

=== Foreign concerts and disbandment (1992–1993) ===
On 7 December 1991, the band played a concert at Christmas Rock Night in Ennepetal, Germany. Jon Willis played bass on this occasion. Also filling in for bass during the next few months were Earl Morris of Detritus and Nic White.

Over the next few months, the band played at festivals and concerts around the UK, the Netherlands and Germany. On 30 May, Seventh Angel played in Utrecht, Netherlands. Mark Broomhead of the fellow thrash metal band Detritus played bass at the time for Seventh Angel, and the band played a concert at Greenbelt festival on 28 August, sharing stage with the reputive Swedish progressive doom metal group Veni Domine.

Seventh Angel toured the Netherlands from 9 September to 12 October and from 12 November until 12 December. Mark Broomhead became a permanent member of the band. Despite work towards a new album for the now three piece group, 12 December 1992 saw Seventh Angel's last gig in Utrecht, Netherlands. The band split up the following year.

Ian Arkley went on to form the doom metal bands Ashen Mortality in 1993 and My Silent Wake in 2005, the former of which disbanded in 2005, and was also the guitarist in the Australian Christian doom metal band Paramaecium in 1999; Tank formed the rap metal group Freekspert and later SukMunki; Mark joined with other former Seventh Angel bassist Simon Bibby on the epic doom project Amaranth and later the experimental rock band Fire Fly.

=== Heed the Warning, comeback and The Dust of Years (2005–present) ===
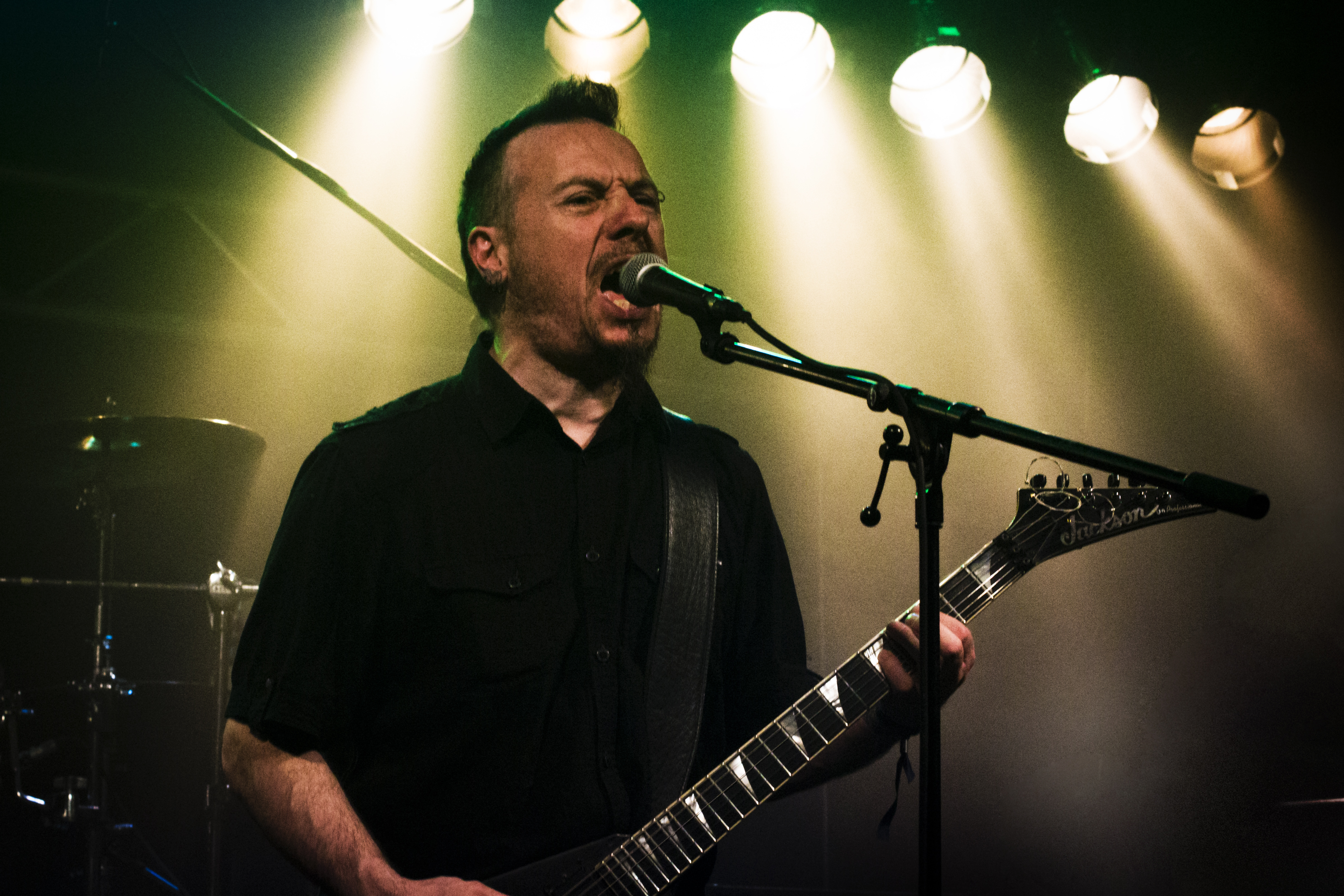
Frontman Ian Arkley in 2012

In 2005, a compilation album titled Heed the Warning: Live & Demo Recordings was released by Bombworks Records, containing Seventh Angel's demo of the same name as well as live recordings of songs from the band's studio albums. On 23 May 2008, Seventh Angel announced they were reforming. They also announced the release of a new album. The band had written half the song material for their new album, according to the press release. The re-issue of Lament for the Weary includes a newly recorded bonus track titled "The Turning Tide". The song features similar thrash/doom style the band is known for, albeit with death growl vocals as opposed to the previous thrash shouting. In late 2008, the band performed concerts in Brainstorm festival, Netherlands and Nordic Fest, Norway. In March 2009, Blabbermouth.net reported that the band would enter studio The Priory in Birmingham with Greg Chandler of Esoteric to record their new album. The cover art was provided by Matt Vickerstaff of Darkwave Art. It was also announced that the band had signed with Bombworks Records to release the album. As reported via their Myspace, during 19–23 March the band recorded the album, entitled The Dust of Years, which was released on 24 June 2009.

Seventh Angel's official Facebook page was launched in 2012. The band's second compilation album, the Demo Collection, was released in 2017 and contains material from their three demos. In 2018, remasters of both The Torment and Lament for the Weary were released. On 20 May 2019, the band posted on Facebook, "We have not split SA as we see no need; we probably never will. We hope to record again one day but there are no immediate plans."

== Members ==
Current

- Ian Arkley – guitars, vocals (1987–1991, 1991–1993, 2008–present) (My Silent Wake, ex-Ashen Mortality, ex-Paramaecium)
- Simon Bibby – guitars (1987–1993, 2008–present) (My Silent Wake)
- Andrew "Tank" Thompson – drums (1989, 1989–1993, 2008–present) (ex-My Silent Wake)
- Mark Broomhead – bass (1992–1993, 2008–present) (Detritus)

Former

- Scott A. Rawson – guitar, bass (1987–1989, 1990–1991)
- Andrew "Andi" Blount – drums (1987–1988) (prior to the first recordings or live performances)
- Andy Hopkins – drums (1988) (prior to the first recordings or live performances)
- Stuart Benton – vocals (1988) (prior to the first recordings or live performances)
- Mark Ruff – drums (1989)
- Colin Brookes – drums (1989)
- Simon Jones – bass (1991)
- Earl Morris – bass (ex-Detritus) (1991)
- Nic White – bass (1991)
- Jon Willis – bass (1991, 1992)

== Discography ==
Studio albums

- The Torment (1990)
- Lament for the Weary (1992)
- The Dust of Years (2009)

Compilation albums

- Heed the Warning: Live & Demo Recordings (2005)
- Demo Collection (2017)

Extended plays

- Just Be Sure It's Pure (1990, split with Bride, Creed, Jeff Scheetz, Seraiah, Xalt)
- White Metal Warriors – Last Ship Home (1991, split with Detritus, Lazarus, Maverick, Stairway)

Demo albums

- Seventh Angel (1989)
- The Rehearsal Demo (1989)
- Heed the Warning (1990)
