= Detritus (disambiguation) =

Detritus is dead or waste organic material.

Detritus may also refer to:

- Detritus (geology), the particles of rock produced by weathering
- Detritus (band), a European thrash metal band
- "Detritus", an episode of Nagi-Asu: A Lull in the Sea
- Detritus the troll, a character in the series Discworld
