= Mr. Zero =

Mr. Zero may refer to:

- Mr. Freeze or Mr. Zero, a character in comic books published by DC Comics
- "Mr. Zero" (song), a song by Keith Relf
- Mr. Zero, an alias of Urbain Ledoux (1874-1941), activist for the unemployed
- Mister Zero, pseudonym of John Picard, guitarist in the Canadian band The Kings
- Mr. Zero, the protagonist of the play The Adding Machine by Elmer Rice
- Mr. 0, an alias of Sir Crocodile, an antagonist from the manga One Piece

== See also ==
- Mr. O, a Canadian children's music television series
