= Renaissance (Renaissance album) =

Studio album by Renaissance
- Released: November 1969
- Recorded: 1969
- Studios: Olympic Sound Studios, London, UK
- Genre: Progressive rock
- Length: 39:21
- Labels: Island (Europe); Elektra (US)
- Producer: Paul Samwell-Smith

Renaissance chronology
Renaissance (1969)	Illusion (1971)

Singles from Renaissance
- 1. "Island" Released: January 1970

Original US release cover

Innocence reissue

Renaissance is the debut album by the English progressive rock band Renaissance, released in November 1969. It established the template which would be followed by the band for the next several years, even through a complete changeover in lineup: progressive rock songs heavily rooted in folk, but with prominent classical and jazz influences. It was a moderate success in the UK, reaching No. 60 on the album charts, yet was a bigger hit in The Netherlands, peaking there at No. 10.

== Background and recording ==
Jim McCarty, the drummer of Renaissance, recalled of writing the songs for Renaissance: "Keith [Relf] and I used to share a room whilst on tour in The Yardbirds and we used to listen to all sorts of different styles of music from Classical to John Cage, Frank Zappa and the Mothers of Invention and so on. These diverse tastes made us want to write songs that were different from the Yardbirds".

The band signed a contract with Island Records in September 1969, and in October they started recording their first album at Olympic Studios. Recording was done with an 8-track mixing table, an upgrade from the 4-track mixing used by the Yardbirds. Paul Samwell-Smith, Relf and McCarty's former bandmate in The Yardbirds who was then still early in his successful career as a producer, produced the album. The sessions were fit in between live dates as the band continued to tour.

== Releases ==
Renaissance was initially released in the UK in 1969 by Island Records as catalogue ILPS-9114; it was also released in America on Elektra as EKS-74068, and by Island in Germany as 87 609 ET. The Elektra issue came in a different cover sleeve.

In 1998, Renaissance was reissued by Mooncrest Records in the UK as Innocence. This reissue included six bonus tracks, but the packaging included no explanation of what they were. Besides "Island" (single version) and "The Sea" (see below), there were the following:

- "Shining Where the Sun Has Been": pre-Renaissance demo (1968) recorded by Keith Relf and Jim McCarty under the name "Together."
- "Prayer for Light" and "Walking Away": tracks recorded, post-Renaissance, by Relf and McCarty (written & sung by Jim) for the unreleased 1971 film Schizom.
- "All the Falling Angels": Demo, 1976. Keith's final recorded performance. Also released on the album Enchanted Caress (1979), under the name Illusion.

On 29 November 2010, Esoteric Recordings released a remastered and expanded edition (including both sides of the band's first single).

== Reception ==
Professional ratings
Review scores
Source	Rating
AllMusic	3/5 stars

A brief retrospective review in Allmusic said that the album, though "a little clunky by today's standards," was groundbreaking for its time and remained somewhat appealing due to its classic and jazz influences and Jane Relf's "striking individual style".

== Tour ==
The album was supported with an extensive tour of Europe and the United States. Jim McCarty recalled of the tour, "The audiences in the UK and Europe seemed to accept that Renaissance wasn't the same sort of band as The Yardbirds had been. The album market was dominating music and groups such as Jethro Tull were making their mark and audiences seemed to appreciate what we were doing. We were particularly popular in Germany. In America it was a different story. We played on really heavy bills with people like Paul Butterfield and Savoy Brown and didn't fit in at all." The setlist consisted of all five songs from Renaissance and a never-recorded, Santana-style song called "McKay's Rave".

== Track listing ==
The single version of "Island" (a different recording from the album version, with faster tempo, more overdubbed backing vocals, and no classical themes at the end) was backed with a non-LP B-side, "The Sea." Some CD editions of the album include both of these tracks.

All tracks are written by Keith Relf and Jim McCarty, except where noted. (Note: Per the original Island release and BMI records (e.g. BMI Work # 11214604). Some later issues, such as the 2008 CD release on Repertoire Records, additionally credit John Hawken and Louis Cennamo as co-writers of all the songs except "Wanderer" and "The Sea", possibly because the sleeve notes of the original Island release include the credits "All basic melodies and lyrics: Keith Relf, Jim McCarty Classical interpretation, riffs: John Hawken, Louis Cennamo".)

Side one
No.	Title	Lead vocals	Length
1.	"Kings and Queens"	Keith Relf	10:55
2.	"Innocence"	Keith Relf and Jim McCarty	7:05

Side two
No.	Title	Writer(s)	Lead vocals	Length
3.	"Island (Note: This track borrows heavily from Beethoven's Pathetique Sonata (Piano Sonata No.8 In C Minor Op.13, 'Pathétique' : I. Grave. Allegro di molto e con brio and III. Rondo. Allegro))"		Jane and Keith Relf	5:57
4.	"Wanderer"	John Hawken, McCarty	Jane Relf	4:00
5.	"Bullet"		Keith Relf	11:24

Bonus tracks on CD
No.	Title	Lead vocals	Length
6.	"The Sea"	Jane Relf	3:00
7.	"Island (single version)"	Jane and Keith Relf	3:37

== Personnel ==
=== Renaissance ===
- Jane Relf - vocals, percussion
- Keith Relf - guitar, harmonica, vocals
- John Hawken - piano, harpsichord
- Louis Cennamo - bass
- Jim McCarty - drums, percussion, vocals

=== Production ===
- Paul Samwell-Smith - producer
- Andy Johns - engineer

== Notes and references ==
Notes
