= The Dust of Years =

Studio album by Seventh Angel
- Released: 24 June 2009
- Recorded: 19 March – 1 April 2009, The Priory, Sutton Coldfield, UK
- Genres: Doom metal, thrash metal, death metal
- Label: Bombworks Records
- Producer: Greg Chandler

Seventh Angel chronology
| Heed the Warning: Live & Demo Recordings (2005) | The Dust of Years (2009) | Demo Collection (2017) |

Professional ratings
Review scores
| Source | Rating |
|---|---|
| Cross Rhythms | 9/10 stars |
| The Phantom Tollbooth | 3.5/5 stars |

The Dust of Years is the third studio album by the British Christian metal band Seventh Angel, released on 24 June 2009 on Bombworks Records. A comeback album, The Dust of Years is the band's first studio album since 1992's Lament for the Weary. While the style continues on Seventh Angel's trademark thrash and doom metal sound, the vocals are death growls as opposed to the previous thrash metal shouts. The album was produced by Esoteric member Greg Chandler who also contributed some growls. The cover art was done by Matt Vickerstaff of Darkwave Art.

== Track listing ==
1. "Chaos of Dreams" – 5:08
2. "The Turning Tide" – 4:59
3. "Exordium" – 6:05
4. "Weep Not for Us" – 6:10
5. "Abélard and Heloise" – 6:30
6. "In Ruins" – 7:10
7. "Lamentations" – 7:33
8. "The Raven Sky" – 10:04
9. "Oświęcim" – 5:28

== Personnel ==
Seventh Angel

- Ian Arkley: Vocals, guitars
- Tank (aka Andrew Thompson): Drums
- Simon Bibby: Guitar, vocals, keyboard
- Mark Broomhead: Bass, narration on "Abélard and Heloise"

Additional musicians

- Cat Brazier: Flute on "The Raven Sky"
- Peter Spencer: Narration on "Oświęcim"
- Kate Hamilton (My Silent Wake): Narration on "Abélard and Heloise"
- Greg Chandler (Esoteric): Guest growls
