= Jane Relf =

- Born: Jane Relf; 7 March 1947 (age 79); Richmond, Surrey, England
- Genre: Progressive rock
- Occupation: Singer
- Instruments: Vocals; percussion
- Years active: 1969–2001

Jane Relf (born 7 March 1947) is a British singer, best known as the original vocalist for the progressive rock band Renaissance. She is the younger sister of Keith Relf of the Yardbirds.

== Renaissance ==
In January 1969 Keith Relf and Jim McCarty of the Yardbirds formed Renaissance with pianist John Hawken and bassist Louis Cennamo. Despite having no previous experience, Jane was invited by her brother to be the new band's vocalist. She subsequently appeared on the band's self-titled debut album later that year.

After Keith Relf, McCarty, and Cennamo left during the recording of the band's second album Illusion in 1970, Jane and John Hawken briefly continued Renaissance with a new lineup including Terry Crowe, Michael Dunford, Neil Korner, and Terry Slade. Jane also introduced lyricist Betty Thatcher to the band, who would continue to write songs for Renaissance until 1981. After the recording of Illusion and the completion of a European tour in the autumn of 1970, Jane left the band and was replaced in the band by American singer Binky Cullom.

== Solo work and Illusion ==
In 1971 Jane released a solo single "Without a Song From You" b/w "Make My Time Pass By" and afterwards recorded many songs for use in commercials, including a promotional single "The Fishermen" for Findus Frozen Foods.

In 1976, Keith Relf was in the process of re-forming the original lineup of Renaissance, including Jane. Following Keith's accidental death by electrocution, Jane and the other surviving original members of Renaissance proceeded with the project and formed Illusion, with new members John Knightsbridge and Eddie McNeil, and Jane and McCarty as lead vocalists. Illusion recorded two albums, Out of the Mist and Illusion, before disbanding in 1979.

== Projects since Illusion ==
Since the dissolution of Illusion, Jane Relf has sung on various Renaissance/Illusion related projects including two albums by McCarty and Cennamo's band Stairway and McCarty's solo album Out of the Dark. In 1990, a collection of Illusion demos was released as the album Enchanted Caress, and in 2001, Jane along with the three other original members of Renaissance recorded the album Through the Fire under the name "Renaissance Illusion".

== Discography ==
Solo

- Jane's Renaissance The Complete Jane Relf Collection: 1969-1995 (2003)

With Renaissance

- Renaissance (1969)
- Illusion (1971)

With Illusion

- Out of the Mist (1977)
- Illusion (1978)
- Enchanted Caress (recorded 1979, released 1990)
- Through the Fire (2001, released under the name "Renaissance Illusion")

With Stairway

- Moonstone (1988)
- Raindreaming (1995)

Other appearances

- Colin Scot - Colin Scot (1971)
- Jim McCarty - Out Of The Dark (1994)
