= Ashen Mortality =

British doom metal band

- Tim Cooper, Ian Arkley, Melanie Bolton and Ben Jones

Background information
- Origin: Halesowen/Birmingham, England
- Genres: Doom metal, gothic metal, black metal
- Years active: 1993–2005
- Label: Forsaken Records
- Spinoffs: My Silent Wake
- Past members: Ian Arkley; Melanie Bolton; Tim Cooper; Ben Jones; Andi Lee; Jasen Whyte; Neil Shilvock; George Aytoun

Ashen Mortality were a British doom metal band formed in 1993 by Ian Arkley (Seventh Angel) and Melanie Bolton. They recorded two demos, and two albums, and played gigs in England, the Netherlands and Germany. Featuring clean and growled male vocals, and female vocals, their music was heavy, slow to mid-paced, and influenced by medieval music, black, doom, death and goth. The band split up in 2005, when Arkley went on to form My Silent Wake.

== Career ==
The first demo tape, Ashen Mortality, was recorded at The Wall, Birmingham, England, from 9–11 October 1993, and engineered by Andy Wickett. The band's first gig was with Rez Band, during November 1993 in Salford, England. During 1994, Ashen Mortality played gigs around the United Kingdom, including a show at the Brixton Academy, London, on 14 May. The second demo was recorded between 16–18 July 1994 at Attic Studios, shortly after which, Jones left the band. On 24 August, Ashen Mortality played at the Greenbelt festival with stand-in drummer, Neal Harris. Harris also played with the band during the tour of Holland and Germany from 2–29 September.

Three tracks from the second demo, "Separation", "Sleepless Remorse" and "Imprisoned", were remixed, and four new songs recorded in 1995 to form Sleepless Remorse, the band's first album. Harris played drums on the new tracks, although Jones can be heard on the remixed demo songs. The album was recorded at Attic Studios (now closed), and was produced for £400. Sleepless Remorse was released in 1996 on Forsaken Records, set up by Bolton. Neil Shilvock joined the band on drums. Ashen Mortality played many gigs in England during the year, playing with bands including: At the Gates, Serenade, Acrimony and Hecate Enthroned.

After a mini-tour to support the release of Sleepless Remorse in 1997, Shilvock left the band, and George Aytoun stepped in to help out. Ashen Mortality played at the Greenbelt festival over the August bank holiday weekend. Aytoun officially joined the band in 1998, and recorded Your Caress. The recording process took place in April 1998. The album was recorded in two days, and mixed in one by Dan Sprigg at Dep International. Shortly after this recording the band relocated to Weston-super-Mare. The band started to play local gigs again in 1999, and their website was constructed by Aytoun, and launched over the summer. Ashen Mortality appeared at the Greenbelt festival at the beginning of August. The band obtained worldwide distribution for Your Caress through Plastic Head. With the exception of a few local gigs, there was little band activity in 2000. Plans to record a third album faded away. After several years of inactivity, the band re-emerged in 2004. Having recruited a new drummer and bassist, they began rehearsing again, and played 2 live gigs.

Due to illness, Cooper was unavailable for the band's final appearances in Norway and the United Kingdom. The last performances featured Andi Lee on bass guitar and Jasen Whyte on drums. A double CD reissue of the two albums, remastered with extra tracks, was released in 2005. The band finally split up, with the original band members going their separate ways in April 2005. Ian subsequently formed My Silent Wake with ex-Ashen Mortality musicians Andi Lee and Jason Whyte, Century Sleeper with James Allin of Visionaire, and played in The Other Window with Alan Southorn. A few years later, Ian also reformed Seventh Angel. In August 2006, Tim Cooper died of leukemia.

== Members ==
=== Last Known Lineup ===
- Ian Arkley - guitar and vocals (1993-2005)
- Melanie Bolton - vocals and keyboard (1993-2005)
- Tim Cooper - bass guitar (1993-2005) (died 2006)
- Jasen Whyte - drums (2004-2005)

=== Former members ===
- Ben Jones - drums (1993-1994)
- Neil Shilvock - drums (1996-1997)
- George Aytoun - drums (1998-2001)
- Marcelo Lopes - drums (2001-2004)

=== Touring members ===
- Neal Harris - drums (1994-1995)
- Andi Lee - bass guitar (2004)

== Discography ==
Studio albums

- Sleepless Remorse (1996)
- Your Caress (1998)

Demos

- Ashen Mortality (1993)
- Separation (1994)
