= Hunter Muskett =

English folk-rock band

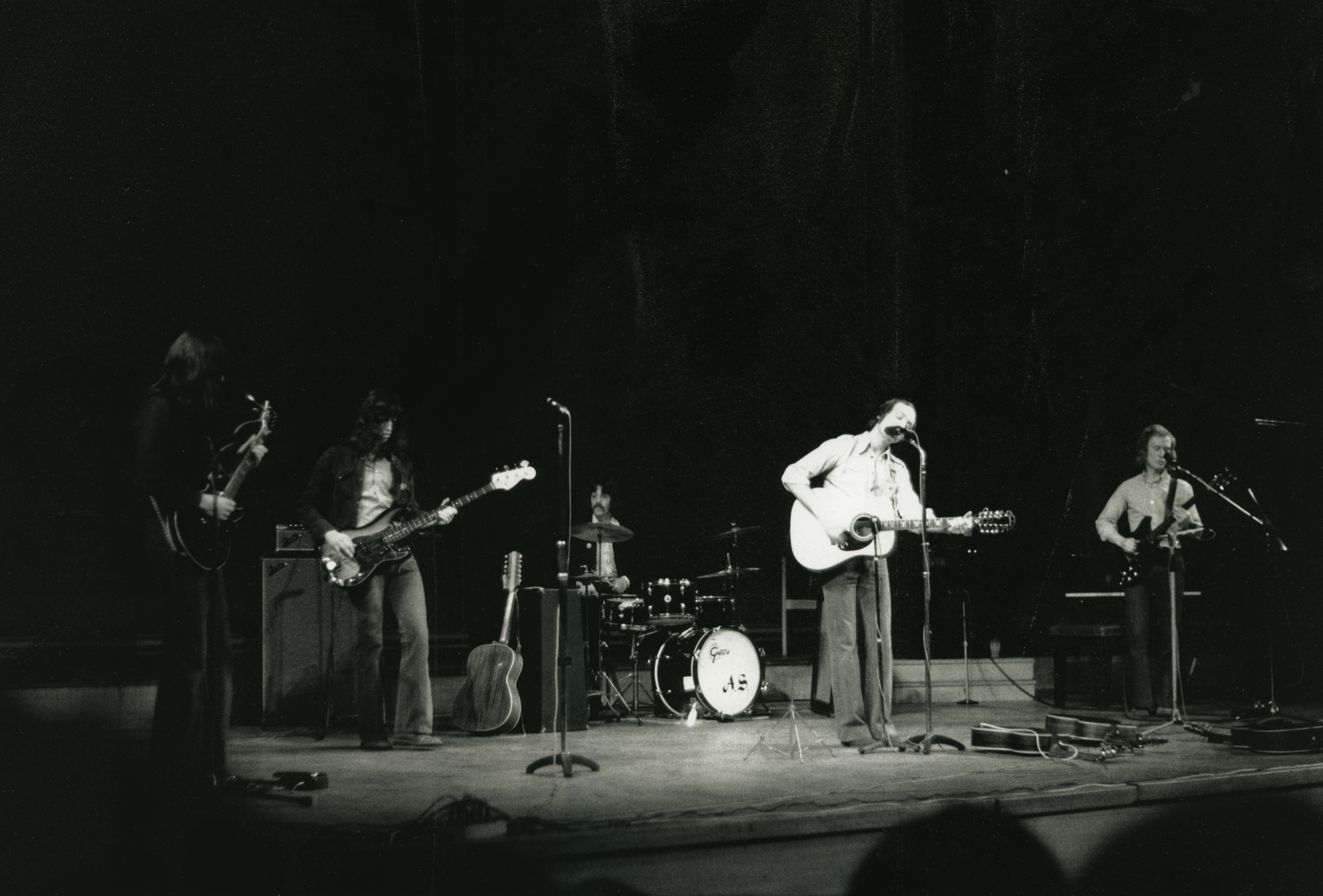
- Hunter Muskett at the Royal Festival Hall, London (May 1973)

Background information
- Origin: Avery Hill College, London, England
- Genres: Folk-rock
- Years active: 1968–1974, 2010-
- Labels: Decca Nova, Bradley's Records, Cherry Tree Records, Limefield, SPC, Wasabi Records (Japan)
- Members: Terry Hiscock; Doug Morter; Rog Trevitt
- Past members: Chris George (left September 2021)

Hunter Muskett is an English folk-rock band, that first existed between 1968 and 1974, and reformed in 2010.

== Beginnings ==
The group was formed at Avery Hill College in South London, when Terry Hiscock and Chris George were joined by fellow student Doug Morter. The band's name was taken from an anecdote about an eccentric Cornishman.

Hunter Muskett began by playing in London folk-clubs and colleges mixing original songs with acoustic folk and blues. Unusually for the time they used a pa system and some electric instruments in folk clubs.

== Recording and touring ==
The band signed to Decca Nova after being spotted playing at The Troubadour in London's Earls Court. On the resulting album, ‘Every Time You Move’ (1970), produced by Kim Margolis, the trio's acoustic sound was augmented by Danny Thompson (uncredited) on double bass and orchestration arranged by Richard Hewson. Bass-player Rog Trevitt joined shortly after the album's release. The Decca Nova label lasted less than a year.

From 1971 to 1974 the band toured the UK and on the continent, also making one trip to Morocco. Although mainly working the folk/college/ circuit, they also played festivals (Cambridge, St Albans, Laycock, Norwich) and major venues, notably as support to Dutch singer-songwriter Lenny Kuhr (Holland and Belgium in 1972), Ralph McTell (UK Spring Tour 1973) and Amon Düül (Belgium and Northern France in autumn 1973). Radio appearances included Radio Hilversum, and the BBC's: Country Meets Folk, Pete Drummond’s Night Ride and Sounds on Sunday.

In 1973 managers Mike Hutson and George Fenton (then working as George Howe) signed the band to Derek Johns at Bradley's Records where they became one of three acts (alongside Paul Brett and Kala ) in a label launch involving considerable promotional expenditure. The album ‘Hunter Muskett’ (1973) produced by Keith Relf also featured Michael Giles on drums, Jim McCarty on percussion, Ken Freeman and John ‘Rabbit’ Bundrick (uncredited) on synthesiser.

Plans to add a permanent drummer were never realised although Andrew Steele played at the Royal Festival Hall (May 1973) and worked on demos for a projected second Bradley's album, whilst Roger Swallow came in for Pete Drummond's Night Ride (autumn 1973).

== Break-up and re-form ==
In 1974, a change of musical policy at Bradleys (now under ex-Mojo Stuart Slater) resulted in the label parting with all three of its original acts in a quest for hit singles. With no record label and finding the economics of keeping on the road increasingly difficult the band decided to split.

Of the four members only Doug Morter continued to work as a professional musician combining a solo career with band and duo work. Now based in Denmark his credits include: Richard Digance, Magna Carta, The Albion Band, Maddy Prior Band, Then Came The Wheel, Jerry Donahue, The Backroom Boys and The Gathering Britannia. Chris George, who had built instruments for Hunter Muskett, became a highly regarded luthier.

Following the official re-release of ‘Everytime You Move' in 2010 Hunter Muskett reformed for a reunion performance. The band now tours again and in 2013 released a CD of new material, 'That Was Then This Is Now', produced by John Ellis and Bill Leader. Two further CDs have followed: 'Unafraid and Sober', featuring contributions from Jacqui McShee and George Fenton, released in 2016 and 'Roll On', including the last known recorded work by US guitarist Jerry Donahue, in 2024.

== Discography ==
Title	Label	Year	Notes
Every Time You Move	Decca Nova Cherry Red	1970 2009	LP CD
Hunter Muskett	Bradleys Self-release Wasabi Records, Japan	1973 2020 2023	LP CD CD
John Blair	Bradleys	1973	Single
Bradleys Roadshow Live At The Marquee	Bradleys	1973	LP (2 Hunter Muskett tracks)
That Was Then This Is Now	Limefield	2013	CD
Unafraid And Sober	SPC	2016	CD
Roll On	Self Release	2024	CD

== Hunter Muskett songs recorded by other artists ==
Silver Coin (Terry Hiscock) appears on the following:

- Thank You For (1972), Dandelion Albums and BBC Collection (2015) - Bridget St John
- Sunsets I've Galloped Into (1995), Windward Away (2008) - Archie Fisher
- All Those Songs (1997) - Derek Brimstone
- Hand Pict (1998) - Ken Campbell

Leave It With Mine (Terry Hiscock) appears on the following:

- The Best Of All Times (2019) - Archie Fisher and Garnet Rogers
