= Detritus (band) =

British thrash metal band

- Origin: Bristol, England
- Genres: Thrash metal, Christian metal, pirate metal
- Years active: 1989–1993, 2019–present
- Labels: R.E.X. Under One Flag, Edge Records
- Members: Mark Broomhead; Andy Bright; Andy Neal; Paul Newington Wise; Michael Bryzak
- Past members: Earl Morris
- Website: https://embryoindustries.com/detritus

Detritus are an English thrash metal band formed in Bristol in 1989. The band consists of two current and former members of the British Christian metal band Seventh Angel. Detritus disbanded in October 1993. Vocalist/bassist Mark Broomhead formed Fire Fly and joined Seventh Angel. The band teased a potential reunion, stating the following: "So first Detritus practice for 26 years, went quite well. Maybe we might do it again sometime." On 9 December 2018, Mark Broomhead confirmed that Detritus' reunion concert would be at the Alive festival in the Netherlands, which was held from 17 to 19 May 2019. Detritus' first studio album in 28 years, Myths, was released on 19 February 2021.

== Members ==
Current

- Mark Broomhead – vocals, bass (Seventh Angel)
- Andy Neal – guitars
- Andy Bright – drums
- Paul Newington Wise – guitars
- Michael Bryzak – guitars

Former

- Earl Morris – guitars (ex-Seventh Angel)

== Discography ==
Demo

- A Taste of Reality (1990)

EP

- White Metal Warriors – Last Ship Home (1991; Split w/ Seventh Angel, Stairway, Lazarus, Maverick)

Studio albums

- Perpetual Defiance (1990)
- If But for One (1993)
- Myths (2021)
