= Tormento =

Tormento may refer to:

- Tormento (1950 film), Italian film by Raffaello Matarazzo
- Tormento (1974 film), Spanish film by Pedro Olea
- Tormento (rapper) (born 1975), Italian rapper

== See also ==
- Torment (disambiguation)
- Tormentor (disambiguation)
