= Tormentor =

A tormentor is someone or something that causes great physical or mental pain or distress to another.

Tormentor may also refer to:

- Tormentor (band), a Hungarian black metal band
- Tormentor (musician), a Norwegian black metal musician
- "Tormentor" (song), a 1990 single by the Canadian electro-industrial band Skinny Puppy
- "Tormentor", a song by Slayer from the album Show No Mercy, 1983
- "Tormentor", a song by W.A.S.P. from the album W.A.S.P., 1984
- Tormentor, an extreme horror video game from Madmind Studio

== See also ==
- Torment (disambiguation)
- Tormento (disambiguation)
