= The Torment =

Studio album by Seventh Angel
- Released: 1990
- Recorded: 16 April–11 May 1990
- Studio: Mad Hat Studios in Wolverhampton, England
- Genre: Christian metal, thrash metal
- Length: 47:56
- Label: Edge Records, Under One Flag (Music for Nations), Metal Mind Productions, Retroactive Records
- Producer: Paul Hodson

Seventh Angel chronology
Heed the Warning (1990)	The Torment (1990)	Lament for the Weary (1992)

Professional ratings
Review scores
Source	Rating
Cross Rhythms	8/10 stars
Rock Hard	8/10 stars
Sea of Tranquility	3.5/5 stars

The Torment is the debut studio album by the British Christian thrash metal band Seventh Angel, released on Music for Nations in 1990. The album established the band as "one of England's leading thrash metal bands" by The Daily Telegraph. In 2010, HM Magazine ranked it number 51 on the Top 100 Christian Metal Albums of All Time list.

== Recording ==
After signing with Under One Flag, a subsidiary label of Music for Nations, Seventh Angel recorded the debut at Mad Hat Studios, Wolverhampton, with producer Paul Hodson. The cover art was done by Rodney Matthews. The album features plenty of tempo changes, progressive elements and considerable amount of death/thrash leanings. Several songs from two of Seventh Angel's three demos were re-recorded for The Torment. The album cover, created by Rodney Matthews, directly references Revelation 9 in the New Testament.

The Torment has been reissued on various record labels. In 2008, a remaster was released by Polish label Metal Mind Productions, which was limited to 2,000 copies and included the demo song "Lamentations" as a bonus track. In 2005 and 2018, American label Retroactive Records released remasters of the album, the latter being part of the "Legends Remastered" series of reissues.

== Reception ==
In a review published on 1 September 1990, Brian Hoff of Cross Rhythms magazine gave the album 8 points out of 10, stating that he was particularly impressed by the music and lyrics. Hoff wrote that, "There can be no doubt about it, this album is going to offend, shock, worry and disgust some people." In reference to the lyrics, he promised they would, "...smack you straight between the eyes and tell it as it is."

For example, "Dr. Hatchet" is a song which accuses those in the medical profession who perform abortions of being cold-blooded murderers. According to Hoff, the song caused "much controversy amongst certain so-called Christian event organizers." Musically, Hoff felt that the only thing that needed criticism was Ian Arkleys vocals: "These are excellent for the thrash numbers, but unlike his guitar work, lack the range, imagination and musicality to cope with a track like 'Katie' where some real vocal dexterity is called for, Ian sounds more like he's talking or doing a 'Make Way' chant than singing." After the release, the British newspaper The Daily Telegraph wrote that Seventh Angel is one of England's leading Christian thrash metal bands. The Torment achieved notable mainstream distribution.

In the 2018 reissue liner notes, Ian Arkley describes the songs on The Torment as "heartfelt", though he states his own lyrics as currently being "a million miles away from my thoughts", while speaking positively about Simon Bibby's lyrics due to him being able to "write in a more poetic way". Eventually, the lyrical style would become more subtle on Lament for the Weary, the band's second studio album.

== Tour ==
During the months following the album's release, the band played concerts in Dudley and Stourbridge, five times in Brierley Hill's The Rock Tavern club. In November 1990, Seventh Angel headlined the Metal Meltdown festival.

In February 1991, Seventh Angel appeared on BBC TV four times with video material recorded at the Metal Meltdown festival. "Forbidden Desires" was the selected song.

== Track listing ==
No.	Title	Lyrics	Music	Length
1.	"Tormented Forever^{[a]}"	Ian Arkley	Arkley	4:21
2.	"The Charmer"	Simon Bibby	Arkley; Bibby	7:17
3.	"Forbidden Desires^{[b]}"	Bibby	Arkley; Scott A. Rawson; Bibby	3:45
4.	"I of the Needle^{[b]}"	Bibby	Arkley; Bibby	5:39
5.	"Expletive Deleted"	Arkley	Arkley	3:25
6.	"Dr. Hatchet^{[a]}^{[c]}"	Arkley	Arkley; Bibby	6:04
7.	"Locked Up in Chains^{[c]}"	Arkley	Arkley	5:09
8.	"Acoustic Interlude" (Instrumental)		Arkley	0:42
9.	"Katie^{[a]}"	Bibby	Arkley	9:44
10.	"Epilogue"	Bibby	Arkley	1:50
Total length:				47:56

^{a} live version appears on Heed the Warning: Live & Demo Recordings (2005)
^{b} songs re-recorded from the Heed the Warning demo (1990)
^{c} songs re-recorded from The Rehearsal Demo (1989)

2008 reissue bonus track
No.	Title	Length
11.	"Lamentations (2008 Demo)^{[d]}"	7:55
Total length:		55:51

^{d} appears on the Demo Collection (2017)

== Personnel ==
Seventh Angel
- Ian Arkley – vocals, guitars
- Scott A. Rawson – rhythm guitar
- Simon Bibby – bass guitar, narration on "The Charmer", duet vocals with Arkley on "Epilogue"
- Andrew "Tank" Thompson – drums

Production

- Paul Hodson – producer, engineer (1990 version)
- Roy M. Rowland – producer (2005 version), engineer (2005 and 2018 versions)
- Matthew B. Hunt – executive producer (2018 version)
Additional personnel
- Rodney Matthews – artwork
- Paul Hodson – additional instruments
- Nick Capewell, Wayne Jukes, Lynn Williams, and Seventh Angel – backing vocals
- Rev – remastering at Creation Station Media (2005 version)
- Jeff Mortimer – remastering at JM Mastering in London, England (2008 version)
- Rob Colwell – remastering at Bombworks Sound in McKinney, Texas (2018 version)
- Scott Waters (Ultimatum) – design, layout (2018 version)
