= Lament for the Weary =

Studio album by Seventh Angel
- Released: 1991
- Recorded: 4–16 July 1991
- Studios: ICC Studios in Eastbourne, England
- Genres: Christian metal, thrash metal, doom metal
- Length: 55:45
- Labels: Edge Records, Under One Flag (Music for Nations), Metal Mind Productions, Retroactive Records
- Producer: Roy M. Rowland

Seventh Angel chronology
The Torment (1990)	Lament for the Weary (1991)	Heed the Warning: Live & Demo Recordings (2005)

Professional ratings
Review scores
Source	Rating
Cross Rhythms	8/10 stars
Rock Hard	8.5/10 stars
Sea of Tranquility	4/5 stars
The Phantom Tollbooth	3/5 stars
The Whipping Post	9.7/10 stars

Lament for the Weary is Christian thrash metal band Seventh Angel's second studio album, released in late 1991 on Music for Nations. The album saw the band incorporating doom metal elements to thrash. The album garnered generous reviews from British music press at the time. Lament for the Weary is a concept album about a man who suffered abuse during childhood and struggles with depression and suicidal thoughts in adulthood. On his deathbed, the man gets his childhood faith back and is not afraid to die anymore.

== Recording history ==
The album was recorded during 4–16 July 1991 at ICC Studios with producer Roy Rowland. The album was mixed during 1–10 August 1991. John 10:10, from the New Testament, is written on the back cover of the album. The cover art for the album was done by British artist Rodney Matthews.

On the album, the style changed to a more progressive and atmospheric combination of doom metal and thrash. The guitars were tuned down to D, and the compositions include acoustic passages such as on the title track, driven with a samples of raining to create a melancholic atmosphere. The drummer Tank's musicianship is more varied compared to that on The Torment (1990). The album begins with a mid-tempo instrumental. The tempo increases as "Life in All Its Emptiness" begins. Arkley plays curbed yet intimidating solos and melodies on technical rhythm guitar riffs.

Lament for the Weary has been reissued on various record labels. In 2008, a remaster was released by Polish label Metal Mind Productions, which was limited to 2,000 copies and included the demo song "The Turning Tide" as a bonus track. In 2005 and 2018, American label Retroactive Records released remasters of the album, the latter being part of the "Legends Remastered" series of reissues.

== Reception ==
Lynn Williams of UK magazine Cross Rhythms wrote in an issue published on 1 July 1992 that Lament for the Weary is a clear improvement over The Torment and called Lament "superior thrash". In a 2005 review of the album's reissue, The Whipping Post's Matt Morrow states that Lament for the Weary belongs to one of the very best albums of heavy metal music in general and that the album is "a classic in every sense of the word". In the 2005 reissue edition's liner notes, Nick Bolton writes that "the guitar work led one reviewer to declare that the album contains some of the best guitar solos he had ever heard". After the release, the band played concerts in Germany and the Netherlands.

In the 2018 reissue liner notes for Lament for the Weary, Ian Arkley writes: "The recordings we ended up with are something I am still very proud of."

== Track listing ==
No.	Title	Lyrics	Music	Length
1.	"Recollections of a Life Once Lived" (Instrumental)		Andrew "Tank" Thompson; Scott A. Rawson; Ian Arkley	2:53
2.	"Life in All Its Emptiness^{[a]}"	Arkley	Arkley	5:12
3.	"No Longer a Child^{[a]}"	Arkley	Rawson; Arkley; Simon Bibby	5:55
4.	"Full of Blackness"	Arkley	Arkley; Rawson; Bibby	6:02
5.	"Lament for the Weary" (Instrumental)		Arkley	2:18
6.	"Woken by Silence^{[a]}"	Arkley	Arkley; Bibby	6:19
7.	"Falling Away from Reality"	Arkley	Arkley; Rawson	4:54
8.	"Dark Shadows^{[a]}"	Arkley	Tank; Bibby; Arkley	5:34
9.	"Passing of Years" (Instrumental)		Arkley; Simon B. Jones	4:14
10.	"Secure in Eternity"	Rawson	Arkley; Rawson	6:05
11.	"Farewell to Human Cries"	Arkley; Rawson; Tank	Arkley; Bibby; Rawson	6:19
Total length:				55:45

^{a} live version appears on Heed the Warning: Live & Demo Recordings (2005)

2008 reissue bonus track
No.	Title	Length
12.	"The Turning Tide (2008 Demo)^{[b]}"	5:09
Total length:		60:54

^{b} appears on the Demo Collection (2017)

== Personnel ==
Seventh Angel
- Ian Arkley – vocals, lead and acoustic guitars
- Scott A. Rawson – rhythm and acoustic guitars
- Andrew "Tank" Thompson – drums
- Simon Brynmawr Jones – bass guitar

Production

- Roy M. Rowland – producer, engineer, mixer
- Steve "The Rock" Rispin – assistant mixing engineer
- Matthew B. Hunt – executive producer (2018 version)
Additional personnel
- Rodney Matthews – artwork
- Bob Underhill – photography
- Seventh Angel and Roy M. Rowland – arrangements
- Nick Capewell and Wayne Jukes – road crew
- Jeff Mortimer – remastering at JM Mastering in London, England (2008 version)
- Rob Colwell – remastering at Bombworks Sound in McKinney, Texas (2018 version)
- Scott Waters (Ultimatum) – design, layout (2018 version)
