= Mr. Zero (song) =

Single by Keith Relf
- Released: 1966
- Recorded: 1966
- Genre: Psychedelic rock
- Label: Columbia Records
- Songwriter(s): Bob Lind
- Producer(s): Paul Samwell-Smith, Simon Napier-Bell

Mr. Zero is a song by Yardbirds vocalist Keith Relf. It charted at No. 50 on the UK Singles Chart.
