= Keith Relf =

English musician (1943–1976)

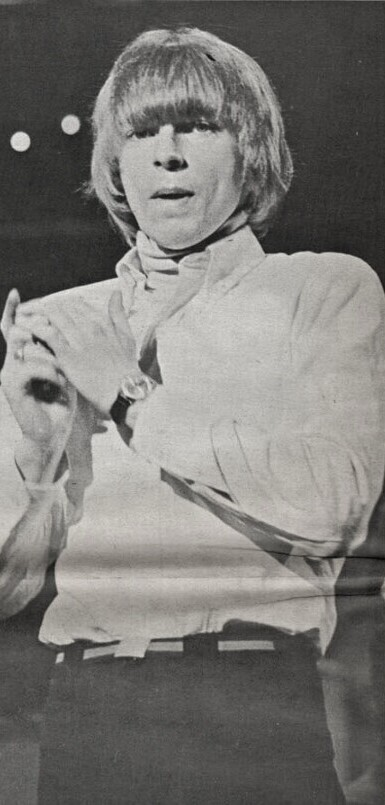
- Relf in January 1966

Background information
- Born: William Keith Relf; 22 March 1943; Richmond, England
- Died: 12 May 1976 (aged 33) Hounslow, Greater London, England
- Genres: Blues rock; hard rock; psychedelic rock; folk rock; progressive rock
- Occupations: Musician; singer; songwriter; producer
- Instruments: Vocals; guitar; harmonica; percussion; bass
- Years active: 1956–1976
- Formerly of: The Yardbirds; Renaissance; Medicine Head; Armageddon
- Website: keithrelf.com

William Keith Relf (22 March 1943 – 12 May 1976) was an English musician, best known as the lead vocalist and harmonica player for rock band the Yardbirds. He then formed the band Renaissance with his sister Jane Relf, the Yardbirds ex-drummer Jim McCarty and ex–The Nashville Teens keyboardist John Hawken.

== Early life ==
Relf was born in the Richmond Institution on 22 March 1943 to Mary Elsie Vickers and William Arthur Percy Relf. Keith had a sister Jane. His father was a builder, while his mother was a housewife.

== Musical career ==
=== The Yardbirds ===
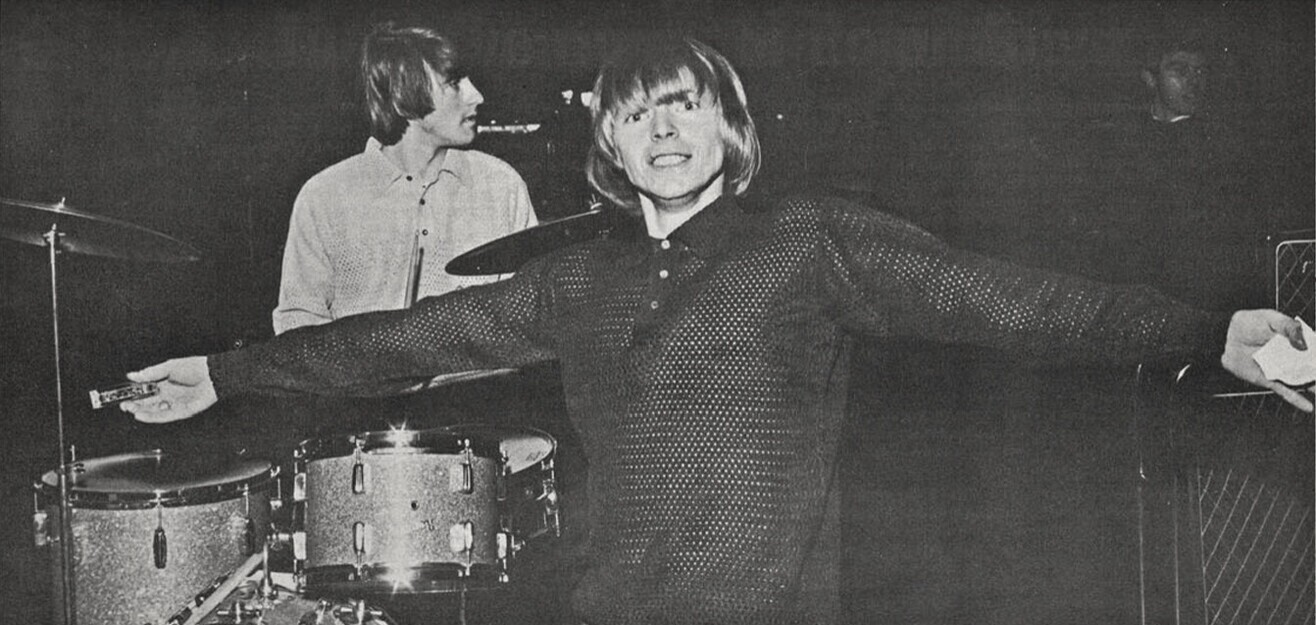
Relf and Jim McCarty, early 1966

Relf started playing in bands around the summer of 1956 as a singer, guitarist, and harmonica player. He was in a band with Paul Samwell-Smith called The Metropolitan Blues Quartet. They met Chris Dreja, Jim McCarty and Top Topham and backed Cyril Davies at Kingston Art School, which led to the forming of The Yardbirds in 1963, the name which was apparently first chosen by Relf according to McCarty which he likely chose from Jack Kerouac's novel On the Road, where it referred to railroad yard hobos.

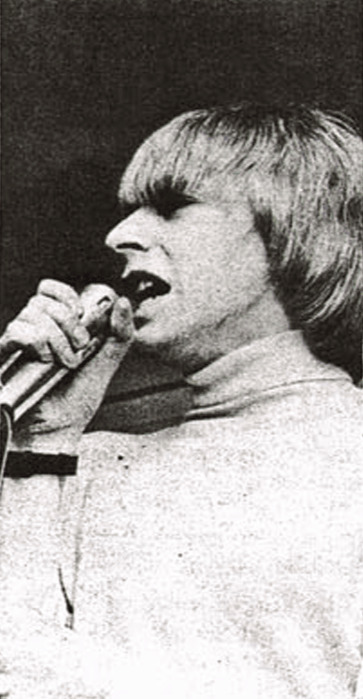
Keith Relf singing in mid-1966

Relf co-wrote many of the original Yardbirds songs ("Shapes of Things", "I Ain't Done Wrong", "Over Under Sideways Down", "Happenings Ten Years Time Ago"), later showing a leaning towards acoustic/folk music as the sixties unfolded ("Only the Black Rose"). He also sang an early version of "Dazed and Confused" in live Yardbirds concerts, after hearing musician Jake Holmes perform the song, which was later recorded by the band's successor group Led Zeppelin.

His debut solo single, "Mr. Zero", peaked at No. 50 in the UK Singles Chart in May 1966.

=== 1970s ===
After the Yardbirds broke up in July 1968, Relf formed the acoustic duo Together, with fellow Yardbird Jim McCarty, followed immediately by Renaissance (which also featured his sister Jane Relf). After leaving Renaissance in 1970, he started producing other artists: Steamhammer, folk rock band Hunter Muskett, the acoustic world music group Amber, psychedelic band Saturnalia, and blues rock band Medicine Head (with whom he also played bass guitar).

In 1974, he formed progressive/rock group Armageddon. Their self-titled debut, Armageddon, was recorded in England and released in the United States on A&M Records. The album's original liner notes used the term "supergroup"; their personnel (besides Relf) included drummer Bobby Caldwell (previously a member of Captain Beyond and Johnny Winter's band), guitarist Martin Pugh (from Steamhammer, The Rod Stewart Album, and later of 7th Order), and bassist Louis Cennamo (also formerly of Renaissance and Steamhammer).

Following the breakup of Armageddon, Relf and Cennamo reassembled the original line-up of Renaissance, now under the name Illusion because a new line-up of Renaissance was still using the original name. Relf's final recordings before his death were a series of demos by Illusion. Illusion went on to record a series of albums after Relf died, with Cennamo later commenting, "In some way, we did so as a tribute to Keith."

== Personal life and death ==
Relf was a lifelong chronic asthmatic and nearly died on three occasions as a child during a bad asthma attack. His respiratory problems led to him losing a lung; in 1964, Relf passed out during the Yardbirds' first U.S. tour after a lung collapsed, resulting in the lung being removed. In his last years he developed emphysema.

In 1966, he married April Liversidge. They had two sons, Danny and Jason.

On 12 May 1976, Relf died in the basement of his home at age 33 from electrocution while playing an electric guitar. He was discovered by his son Daniel. He may have been taking medications such as theophylline, commonly used to treat respiratory diseases at the time, and these drugs may have led to tachycardia and/or arrhythmia which possibly contributed to his inability to survive the electric shock. It is believed that his guitar amplifier's wall plug was inverted when he stepped on a copper pipe, completing a circuit through his body. His death was announced two days later on 14 May, which is sometimes erroneously listed as the date of his death.

He was buried in Richmond Cemetery.

== Legacy ==
Relf's posthumous 1992 Rock and Roll Hall of Fame induction with the Yardbirds was represented by his widow April, and sons Danny and Jason ("Jay").

== Solo singles discography ==
Most of Relf's recordings were released under the name of the group he was in at the time. However, an early attempt was made to establish him as a solo musician, and two singles came out under his own name in 1966.

- "Mr. Zero" / "Knowing" – UK Columbia DB7920 / U.S. Epic 10044 (May 1966)

A-side written by Bob Lind

- "Shapes in My Mind" / "Blue Sands" – UK Columbia DB8084 / US Epic 10110 (November 1966)

B-side is an instrumental credited to Relf, but actually performed by the Outsiders (not to be confused with the US band, the Outsiders, who performed "Time Won't Let Me"). The US single featured the same version as the UK single; US promotional copies (on red vinyl) featured a complete re-edit of the song.

A further single appeared in 1989:

- "Together Now" / "All The Falling Angels" – MCCM 89 002 (1989)

US release only. The A-side was originally recorded in 1968 by Together. The B-side was recorded on 2 May 1976, ten days before Relf's death.
