= KNKR-LP =

- Hawi, Hawaii; United States
- Frequency: 96.1 MHz
- Branding: Kohala Radio KNKR 96.1 FM

Programming
- Format: Variety
- Affiliations: National Federation of Community Broadcasters

Ownership
- Owner: Kohala Radio

History
- First air date: 2015

Technical information
- Licensing authority: FCC
- Facility ID: 192387
- Class: L1
- ERP: 100 watts
- HAAT: 28 metres (92 ft)
- Transmitter coordinates: 20°14′22.80″N 155°50′1.50″W

Links
- Public license information: LMS
- Website: Official Website

KNKR-LP (96.1 FM) is a community radio station licensed to Hawi, Hawaii. The station is owned by Kohala Radio and airs a variety radio format.

The station was assigned the KNKR-LP call letters by the Federal Communications Commission on March 10, 2014.
