= WNYK =

Nyack, New York; United States
- Frequency: 88.7 MHz

Programming
- Format: Variety

Ownership
- Owner: Nyack College

History
- First air date: 1983
- Last air date: 2022
- Call sign meaning: Nyack

Technical information
- Licensing authority: FCC
- Facility ID: 49883
- Class: D
- ERP: 10 watts
- HAAT: 17 meters (56 ft)
- Transmitter coordinates: 41°4′59.3″N 73°55′43.4″W

Links
- Public license information: Public file; LMS

WNYK (88.7 FM) was a radio station broadcasting a variety format. Licensed to Nyack, New York, United States, the station was owned by Nyack College.

Dr. Charles Beach's show "Memory Lane", which started in 1994, was the longest running WNYK program.

The station's license was cancelled on June 2, 2022, due to Nyack College failing to file a license renewal application.
