= Stairway (band) =

Stairway were an English new-age music band, who have released a total of five albums and cassette tapes between 1986 and 1995.

== History ==
After The Yardbirds' mid-1980s reunion project (known as "Box of Frogs"), drummer Jim McCarty reunited with bassist Louis Cennamo (a colleague from McCarty's days with his post-Yardbirds bands, Renaissance and Illusion), to form "Stairway", a duo which would record largely instrumental and "atmospheric" music. In a departure from their usual roles in bands, for this project McCarty played keyboards and Cennamo (who is credited on Stairway releases as "Loui") played guitar.

Stairway were signed with Colin Wilcox of New World Cassettes, a UK-based independent record label that specialized in "healing music". Their first releases were two cassette tape albums: Aquamarine (1987) and Moonstone (1988), a mixture of songs and instrumentals. Additional musicians on these releases included keyboardist Clifford White, and another colleague from Renaissance and Illusion, vocalist Jane Relf. Although only available as cassette tapes initially, Stairway’s "New World Cassettes" albums were eventually both released in Compact Disc format.

These releases were subsequently followed by two albums with the Psychologist and "Spiritual Healer", Malcolm Stern: Chakra Dance (1989) and Medicine Dance (1992), which they promoted through a few live performances, mainly at St James's Church, Piccadilly (London)

After a few years between releases, Stairway resurfaced once more as "James McCarty/Louis Cennamo" on Canadian flute player Ron Korb’s Oasis label, releasing the Raindreaming CD in 1995.

There have been no new releases by Stairway since 1995. McCarty has more recently been active with a re-formed version of The Yardbirds, and Cennamo has returned to playing bass and doing sessions, in addition to having begun a writing career. In 2015, Angel Air Records released a Stairway "best of" compilation, titled "Pearls Of The Deep".

=== Discography ===
- Aquamarine (1987) ¤

No.	Title	Length
1.	"Dolphin Sounds"
2.	"Ultra Waves"
3.	"Satie"
4.	"Pearl of the Deep"
5.	"Aquamarine"
6.	"Island of Jewels"
7.	"Ship of Happiness"
8.	"Dolphin Sounds"

All music composed and performed by James McCarty and Loui Cennamo (except Satie and Pearl of the Deep composed by Loui Cennamo). James on Keyboards and Percussion. Loui on Guitars and Bass. Vocal on Aquamarine by Jane Relf.

- Moonstone (1988) ¤
- Chakra Dance (1989)
- Medicine Dance (1992)
- Raindreaming (1995)

¤ Note: These two releases were initially available as cassette tapes only. A CD that included tracks from both tapes was later released as Aquamarine.

- Pearls of the Deep (Best Of) (2015)

No.	Title	Length
1.	"The Lovers (vocals Jane Relf)"
2.	"Eagle"
3.	"Light on a Dark Road"
4.	"Moonlight Skater (vocals Jane Relf)"
5.	"Looking Inside"
6.	"Beautiful Changes"
7.	"Base Chakra"
8.	"Lavender Down"
9.	"Deer"
10.	"Aquamarine (vocals Jane Relf)"
11.	"Bird of Paradise (vocals Jane Relf)"
12.	"Sunset Point"
13.	"Wolf"
14.	"Blue Pool"

=== Personnel ===
- Louis Cennamo – guitar
- Jim McCarty – keyboards
- Jane Relf – vocals
- Clifford White – keyboards
- Dave Balen – Percussion and tablas on Medicine Dance
- Andy Portman - keyboards on Base Chakra
