= Louis Cennamo =

British musician

- Born: Louis David Cennamo; 5 March 1946 (age 80); London, England
- Genres: Rock; blues; blues rock; rock and roll; psychedelic rock; hard rock; progressive rock
- Instruments: Bass; guitar
- Years active: 1962–present
- Labels: Pye Records, Parlophone Records, Elektra Records, Island Records, A&M Records

Louis David Cennamo (born 5 March 1946) is an English bass guitarist, who has recorded and/or toured with a number of important British rock/blues/progressive bands, including The Herd, Renaissance and Colosseum.

== Career ==
Cennamo left school at 16 and undertook his earliest important musical project (1962–65) as a founding member of the popular London-based blues/rock band, Jimmy Powell and the Five Dimensions (a band that also included Rod Stewart). They signed a recording deal with Pye Records and released "That's Alright" (written by Powell) as a single in June 1964, and were also hired to provide backing for Jamaican singer Millie Small on her recording of "My Boy Lollipop" (which was a No. 2 hit in both the UK and the US, selling upwards of six million copies). In June 1964, The 5 Dimensions appeared on the bill at the All Night Rave at the Alexandra Palace with headlining act The Rolling Stones (as well as Alexis Korner, John Lee Hooker and John Mayall & the Bluesbreakers), and they further galvanized their place in rock and roll history with performances on Granada TV (with Sonny Boy Williamson and Sister Rosetta Tharpe), Ready Steady Go! and Thank Your Lucky Stars. In 1965, the band was asked to back up Chuck Berry on both his Chuck Berry in London LP and on his three-week tour of England.

Upon leaving the band, Cennamo spent late 1965 to late 1966 as the bass guitarist for The Herd (with Peter Frampton). Cennamo's sole released recording with the band was a cover of a Mick Jagger/Keith Richards song, "So Much In Love" (b/w "This Boy's Always Been True") on the Parlophone Records label. Upon leaving The Herd, Cennamo played briefly with Tim Hinkley, Viv Prince and Mike Patto in the group Patto's People (née Chicago Blue Line) - recording and releasing one single, "Shimmy Shimmy Ko Ko Bop" / "Jump Back", in late 1966.

During the late 1960s, Cennamo also played bass on several recording sessions. Some well documented projects included James Taylor's 1968 self-titled LP and Al Stewart's Zero She Flies.

In 1969, along with Keith Relf and Jim McCarty (formerly of The Yardbirds), Cennamo co-founded the original lineup of the progressive rock band Renaissance. Cennamo played a key role in working up the band's classically influenced song arrangements, and one highlight of Renaissance live performances through this era was his use of the violin bow on his bass on the song "Bullet", which was often the final number of the set. He would continue to use the violin bow on his bass with later bands, on certain numbers. This incarnation of the band recorded two LPs, but a busy touring schedule began to wear on members of the band, and they decided to go their separate ways in the spring of 1970. Cennamo then began recording and performing with British jazz-rock band Colosseum. It was during Cennamo's involvement that Colosseum recorded Daughter of Time (1970).

Cennamo was then recruited by progressive/blues/rock band Steamhammer (1970–72). The band subsequently toured Europe extensively, and recorded the experimental Speech in 1971.

After Steamhammer folded in 1973, Cenammo co-founded Armageddon (1974–75) with American drummer Bobby Caldwell, Steamhammer guitarist Martin Pugh, and "Speech" co-producer (and former Renaissance bandmate) Keith Relf. The band was based in California, but recorded their debut album, Armageddon, at Olympic Studios in London. It was released on A&M Records in the late spring of 1975. Relf's death (by electrocution) in May 1976 effectively ended the band.

Back in England after Armageddon's dissolution, Cennamo then co-founded Illusion with the members of the original Renaissance (minus the late Keith Relf), remaining with the band for two albums (from 1977 to 1979).

== 1980s and beyond ==
Upon the folding of Illusion in 1979, Cennamo began to spend less time on music, and more on his "spiritual development" (although he did release an Album called Diamond Harbour in 1982 with Eugene Romain).

Between 1986 and 1995, Cennamo was involved with a part-time music project called Stairway (which featured Cennamo playing guitar), with his colleague from Renaissance and Illusion, Jim McCarty. Additional Stairway participants included psychotherapist Malcolm Stern, Clifford White on keyboards and Jane Relf (their former Renaissance and Illusion bandmate) contributed some vocals. A primarily instrumental project, the intentions of McCarty and Cennamo were to release music of a "healing" and "meditative" nature, and a total of four full-length tapes and CDs had been released by Stairway on the New World Music label, and one on the Canada-based Oasis Productions label.

In 2001, the four surviving members of the original Renaissance and Illusion issued the album Through the Fire under the band name Renaissance Illusion. The CD continued the keyboard-driven melodic musical style of their previous Illusion records, and opened with Cennamo's bass-led introduction to "One More Turn of the Wheel".

On 3 April 2014, he performed a one-off gig at the Eel Pie Club in Twickenham with Jim McCarty's band Flip Side, which included songs from the first two Illusion albums, as well as the Renaissance Illusion Through the Fire CD.

== Writing career ==
Special Edition as a jazz band came about as a result of Cennamo's jamming with various jazz musicians in North London - they recorded an album called Get This with writer Angela Elliott, which included jazz poetry. According to Cennamo's Facebook page, Daniel Jones of Hawaii based rock and roll band 7th Order has been enlisted as a co-producer for videos of jazz bands (i.e. Special Edition) he had been performing with in recent years. Cennamo also appears to have been writing poetry and short stories more recently and has had several published - in addition to having been very involved in the compilation of recent CD box sets by his previous bands Illusion and Renaissance. Additionally, Cennamo's frequently updated blog on medium.com appears to reference an autobiography currently in the works.

== See also ==
- James Taylor, a 1968 album by James Taylor
- Renaissance, a 1969 album by Renaissance
- Daughter of Time, a 1970 album by Colosseum
- Speech, a 1972 album by Steamhammer
- Armageddon, a 1975 album by Armageddon
