= Illusion (band) =

British progressive rock band

- Origin: London, England
- Genre: Progressive rock
- Years active: 1977–1979
- Labels: Island Records; Edsel Records; Brisk Production; Promised Land
- Past members: Jane Relf; Jim McCarty; John Hawken; Louis Cennamo; Keith Relf; John Knightsbridge; Eddie McNeill

Illusion were a British progressive rock band formed in 1977. They released two albums, Out of the Mist (1977) and Illusion (1978) on Island Records, before folding in 1979. A third release, Enchanted Caress (made up of demos for a proposed 3rd album, from the late 1970s), was released in 1990.

Illusion were intended to be a reunion of the original line-up of Renaissance (whose 1971 album was titled Illusion), but because Renaissance was still active with a new line-up, they could not use the same name. Illusion recorded a series of demos (one of which, "All the Falling Angels", has since been released both on Enchanted Caress and as a bonus track on various Renaissance releases) before their singer and guitarist Keith Relf died from electrocution in the basement of his home at age 33 while playing an electric guitar. Rather than being demoralized, the surviving band members said they were invigorated and inspired by Relf's death, redoubling their efforts to fulfill the band's creative potential. John Knightsbridge (from Third World War, and later of Ruthless Blues) replaced Keith Relf on guitar, and Eddie McNeill was brought in on drums, enabling Jim McCarty to switch from drums to acoustic guitar and vocals. Remaining at their original stations were Louis Cennamo on bass and John Hawken on keyboards, while Jane Relf, who had played both vocals and percussion with Renaissance, now focused solely on vocals.

In 2001, McCarty, Cennamo, Hawken and Jane Relf reunited once again to record Through the Fire, an album of new material, under the bandname Renaissance Illusion.

== Members ==
- Jane Relf – vocals
- Jim McCarty – vocals, acoustic guitar, percussion
- John Knightsbridge – guitars
- John Hawken – keyboards
- Louis Cennamo – bass
- Eddie McNeill – drums

== Discography ==
=== Out of the Mist (1977) ===

No.	Title	Writer(s)	Length
1.	"Isadora"	Jim McCarty	6:56
2.	"Roads to Freedom"	McCarty, John Hawken	3:53
3.	"Beautiful Country"	McCarty, Hawken	4:21
4.	"Solo Flight"	McCarty, Hawken	4:23
5.	"Everywhere You Go"	McCarty	3:18
6.	"Face of Yesterday"	McCarty	5:45
7.	"Candles Are Burning"	McCarty	7:10
Total length:			35:55

Personnel

- Jane Relf – vocals
- Jim McCarty – vocals, acoustic guitar, percussion
- John Knightsbridge – electric and acoustic guitar
- John Hawken – piano, synthesizers, Mellotron, Hammond organ, Fender Rhodes electric piano, harpsichord
- Louis Cennamo – bass guitar
- Eddie McNeil – drums, percussion

Notes

- "Face of Yesterday" was a remake of a song from Renaissance's Illusion album (1971)

=== Illusion (1978) ===

No.	Title	Writer(s)	Length
1.	"Madonna Blue"	McCarty	6:46
2.	"Never Be the Same"	McCarty	3:18
3.	"Louis' Theme"	Louis Cennamo, Jane Relf	7:41
4.	"Wings Across the Sea"	McCarty	4:49
5.	"Cruising Nowhere"	McCarty	5:01
6.	"Man of Miracles"	Keith Relf, McCarty, Hawken	3:27
7.	"The Revolutionary"	McCarty, Hawken	6:15
Total length:			37:28

Personnel

- Jane Relf – vocal
- Jim McCarty – vocal, acoustic guitar, percussion
- John Knightsbridge – electric and acoustic guitar
- John Hawken – piano, synthesizers, Mellotron, Hammond organ, Fender Rhodes electric piano, harpsichord
- Louis Cennamo – bass guitar
- Eddie McNeil – drums, percussion

=== Enchanted Caress (1979) ===
No.	Title	Writer(s)	Length
1.	"Nights in Paris"	McCarty	3:13
2.	"Walking Space"	McCarty	3:58
3.	"The Man Who Loved the Trees"	McCarty	3:28
4.	"Getting into Love Again"	McCarty	3:32
5.	"As Long as We're Together"	McCarty	3:41
6.	"Slaughter on Tenth Avenue"	Richard Rodgers	3:30
7.	"Living Above Your Head"	McCarty	2:53
8.	"Crossed Lines"	McCarty	3:18
9.	"You Are the One"	McCarty	4:00
10.	"All the Falling Angels"	K. Relf	5:27

Personnel

- Jane Relf – vocal, percussion
- Jim McCarty – vocal, acoustic guitar, percussion
- John Knightsbridge – electric and acoustic guitars
- John Hawken – piano, analogue synthesizers (Moog/ARP), Mellotron (original), Hammond organ, Fender Rhodes electric piano, harpsichord
- Louis Cennamo – bass guitar (1–5), (7–10)
- Eddie McNeil – drums, percussion (1–5), (7–9)
- Keith Relf – vocals, acoustic guitar (10) (See Notes below)

Session personnel

- Chas Cronk – bass (6)
- Tony Fernandez – drums (6)

Notes

- Recorded in 1979 but was released as an album in 1990. Contains demos for a planned third album, plus a 1976 Keith Relf demo and a John Knightsbridge solo instrumental.
- "Slaughter on Tenth Avenue" features John Knightsbridge, with Chas Cronk on bass and Tony Fernandez on drums.
- "All the Falling Angels" features Keith Relf, with other musicians including Louis Cennamo on bass. It was Keith's last recording before his death (May 1976).
- See YouTube video (JimMcCarty and Co) for original Home Demo version of "All the Falling Angels".

=== Through the Fire (2001) ===
No.	Title	Writer(s)	Length
1.	"One More Turn of the Wheel"	McCarty
2.	"Good Heart"	McCarty
3.	"Glorious One"	McCarty
4.	"Through the Fire"	McCarty
5.	"Blowing Away"	McCarty
6.	"Mystery of Being"	McCarty
7.	"Beat of the Earth"	McCarty
8.	"Beyond the Day"	McCarty
9.	"My Old Friend"	McCarty
10.	"Through the Fire (reprise)"	McCarty

Personnel

- Jane Relf – vocals
- Jim McCarty – lead vocals, drums, percussion
- John Idan – acoustic guitar
- John Hawken – piano, keyboards
- Louis Cennamo – bass
- Ravi – percussion
- Jackie Rawe – vocals
- Mandy Bell – vocals
- Emily Burridge – cello
- Dzal Martin – acoustic guitar
- Gary Le Port – acoustic guitar
- Jonathan Digby – acoustic guitar
- Danny Relf – synthesizer programming
- Ron Korb – vocals, flute
