= Jim McCarty =

English drummer (born 1943)

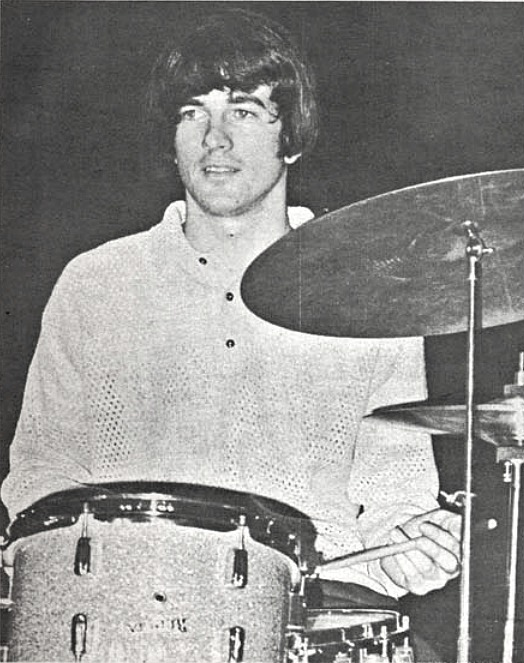
- McCarty in January 1966

Background information
- Born: James Stanley McCarty; 25 July 1943 (age 82); Liverpool, England
- Genres: Blues rock; psychedelic rock; progressive rock; hard rock; folk rock
- Occupations: Musician; songwriter
- Instruments: Drums; vocals; guitar; keyboards
- Years active: 1960s–present
- Member of: The Yardbirds
- Formerly of: Together; Renaissance; Shoot; Box of Frogs; Stairway; Pilgrim

James Stanley McCarty (born 25 July 1943) is an English drummer, best known as a member of the Yardbirds and Renaissance. McCarty has performed and recorded as a drummer and occasional singer with the Yardbirds, Together, Renaissance, Shoot, Illusion, Box of Frogs, the British Invasion All-Stars, and Pilgrim. He was also a keyboardist for Stairway and, under his own name, a guitarist in the Jim McCarty Band.

Since 1992 he has been playing with the reformed Yardbirds. Following Chris Dreja's departure from the Yardbirds in 2013, McCarty became the only founding member to still tour in the band. He was inducted into the Rock and Roll Hall of Fame in 1992 as a member of the Yardbirds. McCarty has released three solo albums : Out of the Dark (1994), Sitting on the Top of Time (2009), and Walking in the Wild Land (2018) as well as two books.

McCarty has contributed to four Yardbird books: Yardbirds (1983. ISBN 0-283-98982-3) / Yardbirds : The Ultimate Rave-Up (1997. ISBN 0-9648157-8-8) / The Yardbirds (2002. ISBN 0-87930-724-2) / Nobody Told Me: My Life with the Yardbirds, Renaissance and Other Stories (2018. ISBN 0244966508).

== Life and career ==
James Stanley McCarty was born at Walton Hospital in Liverpool, England on 25 July 1943. His family moved to Teddington, London when he was two years old. He attended Hampton School in Hampton where Paul Samwell-Smith was a fellow pupil. The first record McCarty bought was either "Bad Penny Blues" by Humphrey Lyttelton or "Born Too Late" by The Poni-Tails.

When playing with the early Yardbirds, he worked as a clerk for the stockbroking firm Phillips & Drew in the City of London. McCarty admitted that addiction to LSD in the 1960s negatively affected his mental health. McCarty's wife, Elisabeth, died from cancer on 7 June 2020, which got McCarty interested in Mediumship. McCarty released a book, She Walks In Beauty, which his wife suggested him to do just before her death.
