= Live the Life (disambiguation) =

Live the Life is a 1998 Michael W. Smith album, or the title track.

Live the Life may also refer to:

- Live the Life, a 1997 live album by Otis Spann with Muddy Waters
- "Live the Life" (Fundisha song), 2004
- "Live the Life", a song by Rod Stewart from Time
- Live the Life Tour, a concert tour by Rod Stewart

== See also ==
- "Live Life", a 1978 song by The Kinks
