= Phil Sawyer =

English musician (born 1947)

- Also known as: Beautiful World
- Born: 8 March 1947 (age 79)
- Origin: London, England
- Occupations: Musician, writer, record producer
- Years active: 1960s–present
- Website: musicbyphilsawyer.com

Philip Sawyer (born 8 March 1947, London) is an English musician who was a member of the Spencer Davis Group in the 1960s and later recorded under the alias Beautiful World.

== Biography ==
Sawyer who attended the Guildhall School of Music and Drama began his musical career as lead guitarist and vocalist in various bands (Les Fleur de Lys, The Cheynes, with a 15-year-old Mick Fleetwood on drums, and Shotgun Express which also included Fleetwood and an aspiring Rod Stewart). In May 1967, at the age of 18, he was one of the two replacements for vocalist, guitarist, keyboardist Steve and bassist Muff Winwood in the Spencer Davis Group, the other being another 18-year-old prodigy, Eddie Hardin on keyboards, bass pedals and vocals,. That lineup debuted May 1967 at London's Marquee Club. Its debut single of July that year, "Time Seller" featured Sawyer singing and playing guitar on the B-side, "Don't Want You No More", a Davis and Sawyer composition. After tour dates in America, Sawyer opted to leave the band in November. The band's spring 1968 album, With Their New Face On, retained his guitar parts for "Time Seller" and "Don't Want You No More", though his vocal on the former was replaced by Hardin and on the latter it was new guitarist Ray Fenwick. "Don't Want You No More" was covered by the Allman Brothers on their 1969 debut album.

After working as a songwriter and record producer for various artists (Florie Palmer, Sandie Shaw) he began writing music for television and radio commercials, corporate films, documentaries and feature films.

Following the success of two songs Sawyer wrote for Timotei commercials in 1992, in 1993 he worked under the artistic name 'Beautiful World': the albums In Existence and Forever have been sold internationally. The Beautiful World albums were regarded as New Age music, and featured vocalists such as Cori Josias, Ella Harper, Russian Roulette (aka Rush Winters), Sawyer's former Shotgun Express colleague Beryl Marsden and Miriam Stockley amongst others.

== Beautiful World discography ==
=== Albums ===
- In Existence (1994)
- Forever (1996)
- In Existence [Re-Release Remastered] (2005)

=== Singles ===
- "Wonderful World" used in the Timotei Honey Shampoo advertisement. Vocals: Cori Josias & Ella Harper
- "In Existence" (1994), WEA – used in the Timotei Almond Milk advertisement
- "In the Beginning" (1993), Warner Music
- "I Know" (1994)
- "Love Is Everything" / "Africa" (1996), WEA
- "Children of the Future" (1996)

=== Videos ===
- In Existence (1994)
- Children of the Future (1996)
