= The Shotgun Express =

Short-lived British R&B band formed in London in May 1966

- Shotgun Express in 1966 (L–R): Rod Stewart, Beryl Marsden and Peter Bardens

Background information
- Origin: London, England
- Genres: Rhythm and blues, soul
- Years active: 1966–1967
- Label: Columbia
- Past members: Peter Bardens; Peter Green; Mick Fleetwood; David Ambrose; Rod Stewart; Beryl Marsden; John Mooreshead; Phil Sawyer

The Shotgun Express was a short-lived British R&B band formed in London in May 1966. Although it achieved little success at the time, it is notable for having briefly included such subsequently famous musicians as Rod Stewart, Mick Fleetwood, Peter Green and Peter Bardens.

The band emerged when Peter Bardens' instrumental group, Peter B's Looners, which included Bardens on keyboards, Peter Green on guitar, Dave Ambrose (who went on to become an A&R man, signing the Sex Pistols and Duran Duran) on bass and Mick Fleetwood on drums, decided to change styles and add vocalists. They were joined by Rod Stewart and Beryl Marsden – who had been the leading female singer on the Liverpool club scene – and took the name Shotgun Express.

The band played London clubs, and focused on performing soul classics. Green left the band in late 1966 to join John Mayall's Bluesbreakers, and was replaced by, first, John Mooreshead and then Phil Sawyer. The group released their first single, "I Could Feel The Whole World Turn Round" (Columbia DB 8025), in October 1966, but it was regarded as over-orchestrated by the band's followers and was not successful.

Shotgun Express split up in early 1967 after Stewart left the band to join the Jeff Beck Group in February 1967. Fleetwood joined Green in John Mayall's band before the two left to found Fleetwood Mac. Marsden joined The She Trinity, Ambrose joined Brian Auger, Sawyer joined Spencer Davis, and Bardens later formed prog-rock band Camel.
