= Hits 2016 =

2016 concert tour by Rod Stewart

Rod Stewart: Hits 2016
- Tour by Rod Stewart
- Poster with the UK tour dates
- Location: Europe; North America
- Associated album: Another Country
- Start date: 14 May 2016
- End date: 1 September 2016
- Legs: 2
- No. of shows: 24 in Europe; 3 in North America; 27 in total

Rod Stewart concert chronology
- Hits 2015 (2015); Hits 2016 (2016); From Gasoline Alley to Another Country (2016–2017)

Rod Stewart: Hits 2016 was a concert tour by British musician Rod Stewart, traveling throughout Europe, in support of his twenty-ninth studio album Another Country.

== Background ==
The tour will begin on 14 May 2016, in Amsterdam, the Netherlands at the Ziggo Dome and will continue throughout Europe and the United Kingdom before concluding on 9 July 2016, in Cap Roig, Spain at the Jardines de Cap Roig. Currently, the tour is planned to travel across Europe and the United Kingdom with a total of twenty-four shows.

== Shows ==
Date	City	Country	Venue	Tickets sold / available	Revenue
Europe
14 May 2016	Amsterdam	Netherlands	Ziggo Dome	11,857 / 11,857	$939,239
15 May 2016	Antwerp	Belgium	Sportpaleis	6,436 / 7,671	$598,515
17 May 2016	Düsseldorf	Germany	ISS Dome	—	—
20 May 2016	Munich	Germany	Olympiahalle	—	—
22 May 2016	Leipzig	Germany	Arena Leipzig	—	—
25 May 2016	Stockholm	Sweden	Ericsson Globe	—	—
26 May 2016	Malmö	Sweden	Malmö Arena	9,675 / 9,675	$967,133
28 May 2016	Łódź	Poland	Atlas Arena	10,478 / 10,478	$794,227
31 May 2016	Berlin	Germany	Mercedes-Benz Arena	—	—
4 June 2016	Norwich	England	Carrow Road	—	—
7 June 2016	Plymouth	England	Home Park	17,528 / 17,528	$2,032,670
10 June 2016	Hampshire	England	Ageas Bowl	26,213 / 26,213	$2,935,400
11 June 2016	Cardiff	Wales	Cardiff City Stadium	21,912 / 21,912	$2,647,720
14 June 2016	Hull	England	KC Stadium	23,778 / 23,778	$2,810,690
17 June 2016	Kilmarnock	Scotland	Rugby Park	19,765 / 19,765	$2,336,940
18 June 2016	Inverness	Scotland	Caledonian Stadium	15,072 / 15,072	$1,773,450
21 June 2016	Carlisle	England	Brunton Park	14,131 / 14,131	$1,749,720
23 June 2016	Nottingham	England	Motorpoint Arena	7,854 / 7,854	$1,180,250
25 June 2016	Kilkenny	Ireland	Nowlan Park	22,603 / 22,603	$2,172,201
1 July 2016	Zürich	Switzerland	Hallenstadion	7,099 / 9,500	$791,699
2 July 2016	Monte Carlo	Monaco	Salle des Étoiles	— (Note: The 2 July 2016 concert in Monte Carlo is part of Monte-Carlo Sporting Summer Festival.)	
5 July 2016	Madrid	Spain	Teatro Real	— (Note: The 5 July 2016 concert in Madrid is part of the Universal Music Festival.)	
6 July 2016	Lisbon	Portugal	MEO Arena	13,619 / 13,619	$919,603
9 July 2016	Calella	Spain	Jardín Botánico del Cap Roig	— (Note: The 9 July 2016 concert in Calella is part of the Festival Jardins de Cap Roig.)	
North America
26 August 2016	Bethlehem	United States	Sands Bethlehem Event Center	1,862 / 1,862	$816,550
27 August 2016	Atlantic City	United States	The Arena at Trump Taj Mahal	4,453 / 4,453	$808,891
1 September 2016	Gilford	United States	Bank of New Hampshire Pavilion	—	—
TOTAL				147,642 / 148,877 (98%)	$16,062,534

=== Cancellations and rescheduled shows ===
1 June 2016	Stuttgart	Hanns-Martin-Schleyer-Halle	Rescheduled to 4 November 2016.
