= Rod Stewart: The Hits =

Rod Stewart concert residency in Las Vegas

- Residency by Rod Stewart
- Promotional poster for the residency
- Location: Paradise, Nevada, U.S.
- Venue: The Colosseum at Caesars Palace
- Start date: August 24, 2011
- End date: August 7, 2024
- Legs: 19
- No. of shows: 154
- Box office: $53,911,159 (93,57%)

Rod Stewart concert chronology
- Heart & Soul Tour (2011–2012); Rod Stewart: The Hits (2011–2018); Live the Life Tour (2013)

Rod Stewart: The Hits was a concert residency performed by singer Rod Stewart at the Colosseum at Caesars Palace on the Las Vegas Strip in Paradise, Nevada from August 2011 to August 2024.

== Background ==
Rod Stewart signed on for a two-year residency at the Colosseum at Caesars Palace, Las Vegas, commencing on August 24, 2011. Performing his greatest hits, the residency also saw him perform selected tracks from his upcoming, untitled blues album. Stewart said the show will be "90 percent songs that people know," including "Maggie May," "The First Cut Is the Deepest" and "You're In My Heart." The songs were performed at the Colosseum when he played at the 4,100-seat venue in November.

"It's a rock 'n' roll show," Stewart told Billboard, "We'll try to give the people what they want, which are the songs that made me famous, plus a few surprises. There won't be any magicians or midgets, just a good rock show."

== Set list ==
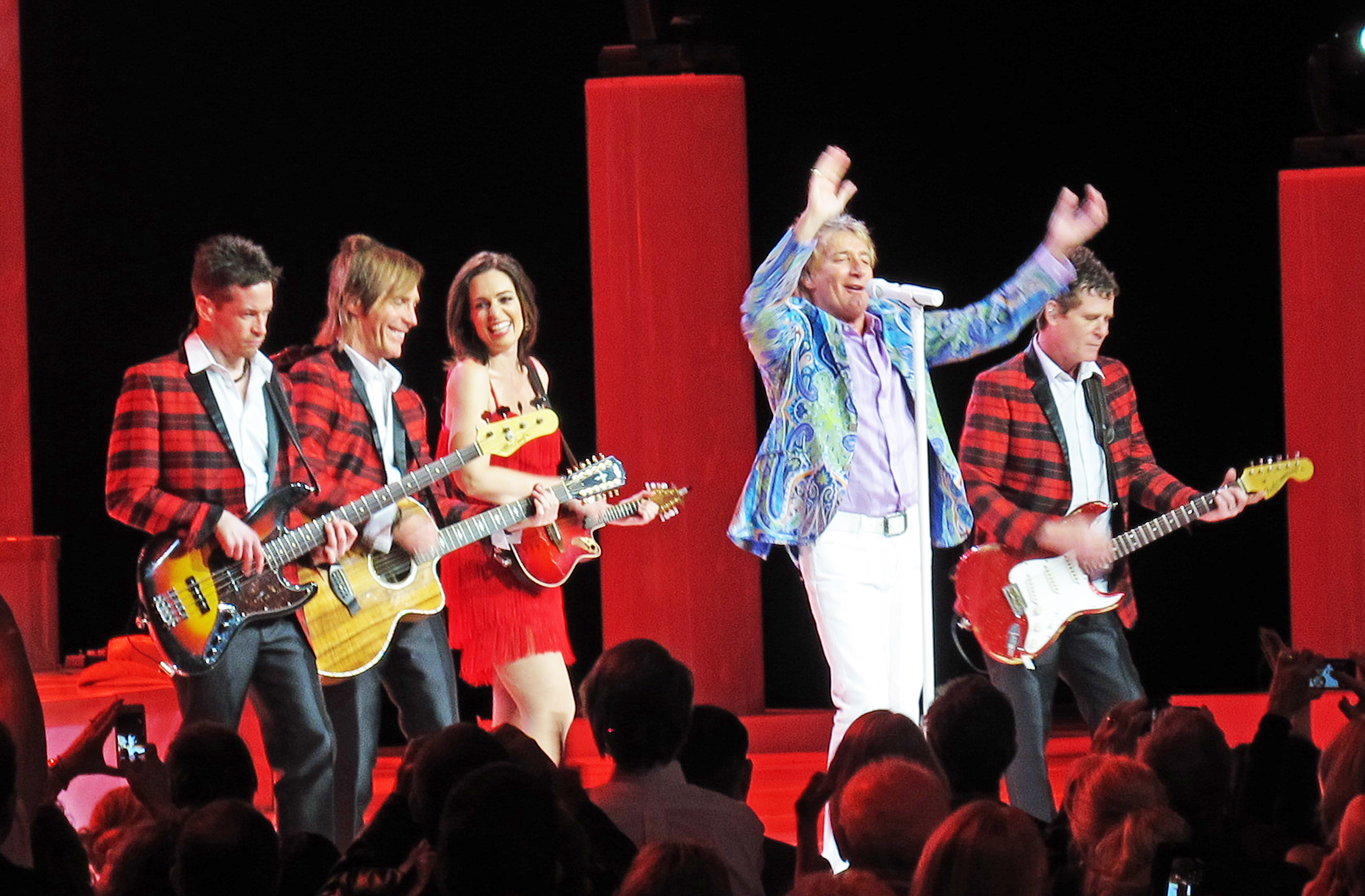
Rod Stewart with musician J'anna Jacoby during Rod Stewart: The Hits in 2013

This set list is representative of the performance on August 25, 2011. It does not represent all concerts for the duration of the residency.

1. "Infatuation"
2. "Tonight's the Night (Gonna Be Alright)"
3. "Forever Young"
4. "Having a Party" (Sam Cooke)
5. "You're in My Heart (The Final Acclaim)"
6. "Some Guys Have All the Luck"
7. "Twistin' the Night Away" (Sam Cooke)
8. "Downtown Train" (Tom Waits)
9. "Broken Arrow" (Robbie Robertson)
10. "The Killing of Georgie (Part I and II)"
11. "Chapel of Love" (The Dixie Cups)
12. "Reason to Believe" (Tim Hardin)
13. "Sweet Little Rock 'n' Roller" (Chuck Berry)
14. "Every Picture Tells a Story"
15. "Proud Mary" (Creedence Clearwater Revival) (Sung by backup singers)
16. "Rhythm of My Heart"
17. "The First Cut Is the Deepest"
18. "Hot Legs"
19. "Maggie May"

Encore

20. "Da Ya Think I'm Sexy?"
Note

Note
In different shows were including new songs like:

- "Angel" - (Jimi Hendrix)
- "It's a Heartache" - (Bonnie Tyler)
- "You Wear It Well"
- "Ooh La La" - (Faces)
- "(I Know) I'm Losing You"
- "Gasoline Alley"
- "Have I Told You Lately" - (Van Morrison)
- "Rollin' and Tumblin'" - (Hambone Willie Newbern)
- "Stay with Me" - (Faces)
- Also they included Christmas songs in the last quarter of the year.

== Shows ==
Date	Attendance	Revenue
Leg 1
24 August 2011	32,862 / 34,114	$4,244,625
25 August 2011	32,862 / 34,114	$4,244,625
27 August 2011	32,862 / 34,114	$4,244,625
28 August 2011	32,862 / 34,114	$4,244,625
31 August 2011	32,862 / 34,114	$4,244,625
3 September 2011	32,862 / 34,114	$4,244,625
4 September 2011	32,862 / 34,114	$4,244,625
7 September 2011	32,862 / 34,114	$4,244,625
10 September 2011	32,862 / 34,114	$4,244,625
11 September 2011	32,862 / 34,114	$4,244,625
Leg 2
3 November 2011	37,141 / 37,141	$5,098,770
5 November 2011	37,141 / 37,141	$5,098,770
6 November 2011	37,141 / 37,141	$5,098,770
9 November 2011	37,141 / 37,141	$5,098,770
12 November 2011	37,141 / 37,141	$5,098,770
13 November 2011	37,141 / 37,141	$5,098,770
16 November 2011	37,141 / 37,141	$5,098,770
19 November 2011	37,141 / 37,141	$5,098,770
20 November 2011	37,141 / 37,141	$5,098,770
Leg 3
24 March 2012	30,946 / 33,163	$4,054,515
25 March 2012	30,946 / 33,163	$4,054,515
28 March 2012	30,946 / 33,163	$4,054,515
31 March 2012	30,946 / 33,163	$4,054,515
1 April 2012	30,946 / 33,163	$4,054,515
4 April 2012	30,946 / 33,163	$4,054,515
6 April 2012	30,946 / 33,163	$4,054,515
7 April 2012	30,946 / 33,163	$4,054,515
Leg 4
19 September 2012	36,804 / 37,521	$5,022,032
22 September 2012	36,804 / 37,521	$5,022,032
23 September 2012	36,804 / 37,521	$5,022,032
26 September 2012	36,804 / 37,521	$5,022,032
29 September 2012	36,804 / 37,521	$5,022,032
30 September 2012	36,804 / 37,521	$5,022,032
3 October 2012	36,804 / 37,521	$5,022,032
6 October 2012	36,804 / 37,521	$5,022,032
7 October 2012	36,804 / 37,521	$5,022,032
Leg 5
23 January 2013	33,796 / 36,691	$4,241,693
26 January 2013	33,796 / 36,691	$4,241,693
27 January 2013	33,796 / 36,691	$4,241,693
30 January 2013	33,796 / 36,691	$4,241,693
1 February 2013	33,796 / 36,691	$4,241,693
2 February 2013	33,796 / 36,691	$4,241,693
6 February 2013	33,796 / 36,691	$4,241,693
8 February 2013	33,796 / 36,691	$4,241,693
9 February 2013	33,796 / 36,691	$4,241,693
Leg 6
20 July 2013	26,538 / 27,854	$3,317,004
21 July 2013	26,538 / 27,854	$3,317,004
24 July 2013	26,538 / 27,854	$3,317,004
27 July 2013	26,538 / 27,854	$3,317,004
28 July 2013	26,538 / 27,854	$3,317,004
31 July 2013	26,538 / 27,854	$3,317,004
3 August 2013	26,538 / 27,854	$3,317,004
4 August 2013	26,538 / 27,854	$3,317,004
Leg 7
6 November 2013	33,213 / 36,533	$4,091,540
9 November 2013	33,213 / 36,533	$4,091,540
10 November 2013	33,213 / 36,533	$4,091,540
13 November 2013	33,213 / 36,533	$4,091,540
16 November 2013	33,213 / 36,533	$4,091,540
17 November 2013	33,213 / 36,533	$4,091,540
20 November 2013	33,213 / 36,533	$4,091,540
23 November 2013	33,213 / 36,533	$4,091,540
24 November 2013	33,213 / 36,533	$4,091,540
Leg 8
30 April 2014	33,359 / 36,998	$4,340,238
2 May 2014	33,359 / 36,998	$4,340,238
3 May 2014	33,359 / 36,998	$4,340,238
6 May 2014	33,359 / 36,998	$4,340,238
10 May 2014	33,359 / 36,998	$4,340,238
11 May 2014	33,359 / 36,998	$4,340,238
14 May 2014	33,359 / 36,998	$4,340,238
16 May 2014	33,359 / 36,998	$4,340,238
17 May 2014	33,359 / 36,998	$4,340,238
Leg 9
20 September 2014	33,149 / 34,578	$4,176,721
21 September 2014	33,149 / 34,578	$4,176,721
24 September 2014	33,149 / 34,578	$4,176,721
26 September 2014	33,149 / 34,578	$4,176,721
27 September 2014	33,149 / 34,578	$4,176,721
30 September 2014	33,149 / 34,578	$4,176,721
2 October 2014	33,149 / 34,578	$4,176,721
4 October 2014	33,149 / 34,578	$4,176,721
5 October 2014	33,149 / 34,578	$4,176,721
Leg 10
5 November 2014	-	-
8 November 2014	-	-
9 November 2014	-	-
12 November 2014	-	-
15 November 2014	-	-
16 November 2014	-	-
19 November 2014	-	-
22 November 2014	-	-
23 November 2014	-	-
Leg 11
25 January 2015	-	-
30 January 2015	-	-
31 January 2015	-	-
3 February 2015	-	-
6 February 2015	-	-
7 February 2015	-	-
10 February 2015	-	-
14 February 2015	-	-
15 February 2015	-	-
Leg 12
31 July 2015	26,501 / 30,751	$3,386,067
1 August 2015	26,501 / 30,751	$3,386,067
5 August 2015	26,501 / 30,751	$3,386,067
8 August 2015	26,501 / 30,751	$3,386,067
9 August 2015	26,501 / 30,751	$3,386,067
12 August 2015	26,501 / 30,751	$3,386,067
15 August 2015	26,501 / 30,751	$3,386,067
16 August 2015	26,501 / 30,751	$3,386,067
Leg 13
19 March 2016	36,716 / 37,873	$4,924,530
20 March 2016	36,716 / 37,873	$4,924,530
23 March 2016	36,716 / 37,873	$4,924,530
25 March 2016	36,716 / 37,873	$4,924,530
26 March 2016	36,716 / 37,873	$4,924,530
29 March 2016	36,716 / 37,873	$4,924,530
1 April 2016	36,716 / 37,873	$4,924,530
2 April 2016	36,716 / 37,873	$4,924,530
5 April 2016	36,716 / 37,873	$4,924,530
Leg 14
3 August 2016	-	-
6 August 2016	-	-
7 August 2016	-	-
10 August 2016	-	-
13 August 2016	-	-
14 August 2016	-	-
17 August 2016	-	-
20 August 2016	-	-
21 August 2016	-	-
Leg 15
15 March 2017	27,810 / 29,433	$3,750,249
17 March 2017	27,810 / 29,433	$3,750,249
18 March 2017	27,810 / 29,433	$3,750,249
21 March 2017	27,810 / 29,433	$3,750,249
22 March 2017	27,810 / 29,433	$3,750,249
31 March 2017	27,810 / 29,433	$3,750,249
1 April 2017	27,810 / 29,433	$3,750,249
Leg 16
18 August 2017	26,997 / 31,755	$3,263,175
19 August 2017	26,997 / 31,755	$3,263,175
22 August 2017	26,997 / 31,755	$3,263,175
26 August 2017	26,997 / 31,755	$3,263,175
27 August 2017	26,997 / 31,755	$3,263,175
29 August 2017	26,997 / 31,755	$3,263,175
2 September 2017	26,997 / 31,755	$3,263,175
3 September 2017	26,997 / 31,755	$3,263,175
Leg 17
12 June 2018	—	—
15 June 2018	—	—
16 June 2018	—	—
19 June 2018	—	—
22 June 2018	—	—
23 June 2018	—	—
29 June 2018	—	—
30 June 2018	—	—
Leg 18
21 November 2018	—	—
23 November 2018	—	—
24 November 2018	—	—
28 November 2018	—	—
1 December 2018	—	—
2 December 2018	—	—
Leg 19
18 September 2019	—	—
20 September 2019	—	—
21 September 2019	—	—
24 September 2019	—	—
30 September 2019	—	—
2 October 2019	—	—
4 October 2019	—	—
5 October 2019	—	—
Leg 20
6 March 2020	—	—
7 March 2020	—	—
11 March 2020	—	—
13 March 2020	—	—
14 March 2020	—	—
Leg 21
6 October 2021	-	-
8 October 2021	-	-
9 October 2021	-	-
13 October 2021	-	-
15 October 2021	-	-
16 October 2021	-	-
20 October 2021	-	-
22 October 2021	-	-
23 October 2021	-	-
Leg 22
13 May 2022	-	-
14 May 2022	-	-
18 May 2022	-	-
20 May 2022	-	-
21 May 2022	-	-
Leg 23
23 September 2022	-	-
24 September 2022	-	-
28 September 2022	-	-
30 September 2022	-	-
1 October 2022	-	-
Leg 24
3 May 2023	-	-
5 May 2023	-	-
6 May 2023	-	-
10 May 2023	-	-
12 May 2023	-	-
13 May 2023	-	-
15 May 2023	-	-
Leg 25
10 November 2023	-	-
11 November 2023	-	-
15 November 2023	-	-
17 November 2023	-	-
18 November 2023	-	-
22 November 2023	-	-
Leg 26
24 July 2024	-	-
26 July 2024	-	-
27 July 2024	-	-
31 July 2024	-	-
2 August 2024	-	-
3 August 2024	-	-
7 August 2024	-	-
Total	415,832 / 444,405 (93,57%)	$53,911,159

== Cancelled Shows ==
Date	Reason
18 March 2020	COVID-19 Pandemic
19 March 2020	COVID-19 Pandemic
20 March 2020	COVID-19 Pandemic
21 March 2020	COVID-19 Pandemic
18 September 2020	COVID-19 Pandemic
19 September 2020	COVID-19 Pandemic
22 September 2020	COVID-19 Pandemic
24 September 2020	COVID-19 Pandemic
25 September 2020	COVID-19 Pandemic
30 September 2020	COVID-19 Pandemic
2 October 2020	COVID-19 Pandemic
3 October 2020	COVID-19 Pandemic

== See also ==
- List of most-attended concert series at a single venue
