= Out of Order Tour =

1988–89 concert tour by Rod Stewart

- Tour by Rod Stewart
- Poster and tickets to the concert in Landover, Maryland
- Associated album: Out of Order
- Start date: 1 July 1988
- End date: 13 August 1989
- Legs: 3
- No. of shows: 136 in North America; 6 in South America; 142 in total

Rod Stewart concert chronology
- Every Beat of My Heart Tour (1986); Out of Order Tour (1988–1989); Vagabond Tour (1991–1992)

The Out of Order Tour was a 1988–89 worldwide tour held by British singer Rod Stewart to promote his album at that time, Out of Order. The tour visited the Americas. It began on July 1, 1988, in San Juan, Puerto Rico and ended on August 13, 1989, in St. John's, Canada.

== Setlist ==
Standard setlist
1. The Stripper (Intro)
2. Lost in You
3. Infatuation
4. Tonight's The Night (Gonna Be Alright)
5. Hot Legs
6. Young Turks
7. Some Guys Have All The Luck (The Persuaders cover)
8. The First Cut Is The Deepest
9. You’re in My Heart (The Final Acclaim)
10. Dynamite
11. Forever Young
12. People Get Ready (The Impressions cover)
13. Da Ya Think I’m Sexy?
14. Passion
15. Maggie May
16. Stay With Me (Faces song)

== Tour dates ==
| Date | City | Country | Venue | Tickets sold / available | Revenue |
North America
| 1 July 1988 | San Juan | Puerto Rico | Hiram Bithorn Stadium | | |
| 2 July 1988 | Tampa | United States | Tampa Stadium | 38,122 / 45,000 | $762,440 |
| 3 July 1988 | Miami Gardens | United States | Joe Robbie Stadium | 33,850 / 50,000 | $677,000 |
| 6 July 1988 | Pensacola | United States | Pensacola Civic Center | | |
| 8 July 1988 | Charlotte | United States | Charlotte Coliseum | 9,400 / 9,400 | $163,000 |
| 9 July 1988 | Chapel Hill | United States | Dean Smith Center | 10,294 / 14,004 | $170,275 |
| 10 July 1988 | Norfolk | United States | Norfolk Scope | | |
| 12 July 1988 | Antioch | United States | Starwood Amphitheatre | 11,000 / 17,000 | |
| 13 July 1988 | Pelham | United States | Oak Mountain Amphitheatre | | |
| 15 July 1988 | St. Louis | United States | St. Louis Arena | 12,539 / 13,110 | $212,380 |
| 16 July 1988 | Little Rock | United States | Barton Coliseum | 8,858 / 8,858 | $145,146 |
| 17 July 1988 | Shreveport | United States | Hirsch Memorial Coliseum | | |
| 20 July 1988 | New Orleans | United States | Lakefront Arena | 10,319 / 10,319 | $176,176 |
| 21 July 1988 | Houston | United States | The Summit | | |
| 23 July 1988 | Dallas | United States | Coca-Cola Starplex Amphitheatre | | |
| 24 July 1988 | Austin | United States | Frank Erwin Center | | |
| 26 July 1988 | Norman | United States | Lloyd Noble Center | | |
| 27 July 1988 | Bonner Springs | United States | Sandstone Amphitheater | | |
| 29 July 1988 | Greenwood Village | United States | Fiddler's Green Amphitheatre | | |
| 30 July 1988 | Salt Lake City | United States | Salt Palace | | |
| 1 August 1988 | Seattle | United States | Seattle Center Coliseum | | |
| 3 August 1988 | Reno | United States | Lawlor Events Center | | |
| 5 August 1988 | Paso Robles | United States | Mid State Fair | | |
| 7 August 1988 | San Diego | United States | Devore Stadium | | |
| 9 August 1988 | Inglewood | United States | The Forum | | |
| 10 August 1988 | Inglewood | United States | The Forum | | |
| 11 August 1988 | Inglewood | United States | The Forum | | |
| 14 August 1988 | Mountain View | United States | Shoreline Amphitheatre | 9,436 / 15,000 | $170,628 |
| 16 August 1988 | Concord | United States | Concord Pavilion | | |
| 20 August 1988 | Vancouver | Canada | Pacific Coliseum | 12,444 / 12,444 | $251,148 |
| 22 August 1988 | Calgary | Canada | The Saddledome | 15,625 / 15,625 | $310,541 |
| 27 August 1988 | Ottawa | Canada | Lansdowne Park | 10,428 / 15,842 | $207,257 |
| 28 August 1988 | Toronto | Canada | CNE Grandstand | 24,721 / 24,721 | $518,259 |
| 29 August 1988 | Saratoga Springs | United States | Saratoga Performing Arts Center | | |
| 31 August 1988 | Montreal | Canada | Montreal Forum | 14,215 / 15,327 | $282,502 |
| 1 September 1988 | Hamilton | Canada | Copps Coliseum | 8,707 / 17,000 | $171,081 |
| 3 September 1988 | Charlevoix | United States | Castle Farms | | |
| 17 September 1988 | Wantagh | United States | Jones Beach Theater | 20,000 / 20,000 | $450,000 |
| 18 September 1988 | Wantagh | United States | Jones Beach Theater | 20,000 / 20,000 | $450,000 |
| 19 September 1988 | Portland | United States | Cumberland County Civic Center | | |
| 22 September 1988 | Worcester | United States | Worcester Centrum | 12,131 / 12,131 | $224,423 |
| 23 September 1988 | Providence | United States | Providence Civic Center | 13,397 / 13,397 | $234,447 |
| 24 September 1988 | Boston | United States | Boston Garden | 14,140 / 14,140 | $254,520 |
| 26 September 1988 | New York City | United States | Madison Square Garden | 22,782 / 22,782 | $678,120 |
| 27 September 1988 | New York City | United States | Madison Square Garden | 22,782 / 22,782 | $678,120 |
| 30 September 1988 | Philadelphia | United States | Spectrum | 18,379 / 18,379 | $305,042 |
| 1 October 1988 | Richmond | United States | Richmond Coliseum | | |
| 2 October 1988 | Knoxville | United States | Thompson–Boling Arena | | |
| 18 October 1988 | Auburn Hills | United States | The Palace of Auburn Hills | 29,606 / 29,606 | $547,711 |
| 19 October 1988 | Auburn Hills | United States | The Palace of Auburn Hills | 29,606 / 29,606 | $547,711 |
| 20 October 1988 | Lexington | United States | Rupp Arena | 10,248 / 13,200 | $171,654 |
| 22 October 1988 | Rosemont | United States | Rosemont Horizon | | |
| 30 October 1988 | Atlanta | United States | Omni Coliseum | 13,988 / 13,988 | $258,778 |
| 2 November 1988 | Savannah | United States | Civic Center | | |
| 5 November 1988 | Honolulu | United States | Neal S. Blaisdell Center | | |
| 11 November 1988 | Costa Mesa | United States | Pacific Amphitheatre | | |
| 12 November 1988 | Phoenix | United States | Arizona Veterans Memorial Coliseum | 10,170 / 12,985 | $178,699 |
| 14 November 1988 | Sacramento | United States | ARCO Arena | | |
| 18 November 1988 | Edmonton | Canada | Northlands Coliseum | 13,581 / 15,000 | $271,479 |
| 20 November 1988 | Saskatoon | Canada | Saskatchewan Place | | |
| 22 November 1988 | Winnipeg | Canada | Winnipeg Arena | | |
| 24 November 1988 | Toronto | Canada | Maple Leaf Gardens | 16,403 / 16,403 | $373,502 |
| 25 November 1988 | Montreal | Canada | Montreal Forum | 14,221 / 15,327 | $314,170 |
| 27 November 1988 | Philadelphia | United States | Spectrum | 17,379 / 17,379 | $288,779 |
| 29 November 1988 | Hartford | United States | Hartford Civic Center | | |
| 30 November 1988 | East Rutherford | United States | Brendan Byrne Arena | 19,550 / 19,550 | $390,560 |
| 2 December 1988 | Pittsburgh | United States | Civic Arena | 13,654 / 13,654 | $243,768 |
| 3 December 1988 | Richfield | United States | Richfield Coliseum | 14,230 / 14,230 | $249,025 |
| 4 December 1988 | Indianapolis | United States | Market Square Arena | 10,082 / 18,154 | $166,320 |
| 7 December 1988 | Cincinnati | United States | Riverfront Coliseum | 10,004 / 17,000 | |
| 8 December 1988 | Louisville | United States | Freedom Hall | 7,356 / 14,900 | $121,374 |
| 10 December 1988 | Charleston | United States | Charleston Civic Center | | |
| 11 December 1988 | Landover | United States | Capital Centre | 14,766 / 17,009 | $273,171 |
South America
| 25 February 1989 | Mar del Plata | Argentina | Estadio José María Minella | | |
| 28 February 1989 | Montevideo | Uruguay | Estadio Centenario | | |
| 3 March 1989 | Buenos Aires | Argentina | River Plate Stadium | | |
| 7 March 1989 | Santiago | Chile | Estadio Nacional | | |
| 23 March 1989 | Florianópolis | Brazil | Estádio Orlando Scarpelli | | |
| 26 March 1989 | Porto Alegre | Brazil | Estádio Olímpico Monumental | | |
| 28 March 1989 | São Paulo | Brazil | Olympia | | |
| 29 March 1989 | São Paulo | Brazil | Olympia | | |
| 31 March 1989 | Rio de Janeiro | Brazil | Praça da Apoteose | | |
| 2 April 1989 | São Paulo | Brazil | Estádio Palestra Itália | | |
North America
| 7 April 1989 | Monterrey | Mexico | Estadio Universitario | | |
| 9 April 1989 | Querétaro | Mexico | Estadio Corregidora | | |
| 10 April 1989 | Querétaro | Mexico | Estadio Corregidora | | |
| 12 April 1989 | Guadalajara | Mexico | Estadio Jalisco | | |
| 14 April 1989 | Costa Mesa | United States | Pacific Amphitheatre | 37,282 / 37,282 | $813,470 |
| 15 April 1989 | Costa Mesa | United States | Pacific Amphitheatre | 37,282 / 37,282 | $813,470 |
| 19 April 1989 | Tulsa | United States | Tulsa Convention Center | | |
| 21 April 1989 | Dallas | United States | Coca-Cola Starplex Amphitheatre | | |
| 22 April 1989 | Lafayette | United States | Cajundome | 10,933 / 10,933 | $187,110 |
| 23 April 1989 | Houston | United States | The Summit | 13,592 / 13,592 | $240,685 |
| 26 April 1989 | New Orleans | United States | Lakefront Arena | 10,375 / 10,375 | $184,815 |
| 27 April 1989 | Tampa | United States | USF Sun Dome | 10,149 / 10,149 | $182,682 |
| 28 April 1989 | Orlando | United States | Orlando Arena | | |
| 30 April 1989 | Miami | United States | Miami Arena | | |
| 4 May 1989 | Chattanooga | United States | UTC Arena | 10,767 / 10,767 | $181,335 |
| 6 May 1989 | Greensboro | United States | Greensboro Coliseum | 12,294 / 12,494 | $218,411 |
| 7 May 1989 | Charlotte | United States | Charlotte Coliseum | 16,157 / 16,695 | $283,365 |
| 9 May 1989 | Troy | United States | Houston Field House | 7,404 / 7,404 | $133,829 |
| 10 May 1989 | Ottawa | Canada | Ottawa Civic Centre | 9,273 / 9,500 | $200,392 |
| 12 May 1989 | Montreal | Canada | Montreal Forum | 11,188 / 12,500 | $250,619 |
| 13 May 1989 | Quebec City | Canada | Colisée de Québec | 8,163 / 11,200 | $177,681 |
| 23 May 1989 | Halifax | Canada | Halifax Metro Centre | 29,415 / 30,000 | $759,993 |
| 24 May 1989 | Halifax | Canada | Halifax Metro Centre | 29,415 / 30,000 | $759,993 |
| 25 May 1989 | Halifax | Canada | Halifax Metro Centre | 29,415 / 30,000 | $759,993 |
| 28 May 1989 | Mansfield | United States | Great Woods | 28,955 / 30,000 | $540,771 |
| 29 May 1989 | Mansfield | United States | Great Woods | 28,955 / 30,000 | $540,771 |
| 31 May 1989 | Philadelphia | United States | Mann Music Center | 21,601 / 26,200 | $383,364 |
| 1 June 1989 | Philadelphia | United States | Mann Music Center | 21,601 / 26,200 | $383,364 |
| 2 June 1989 | Uniondale | United States | Nassau Coliseum | 17,000 / 17,000 | $340,000 |
| 5 June 1989 | Sydney | Canada | Sydney Center | 5,925 / 5,925 | $160,871 |
| 16 May 1989 | Moncton | Canada | Moncton Coliseum | 7,668 / 8,300 | $208,719 |
| 8 June 1989 | Toronto | Canada | Skydome | 33,437 / 33,437 | $759,562 |
| 9 June 1989 | Hershey | United States | Hersheypark Stadium | 15,193 / 15,193 | $281,071 |
| 10 June 1989 | Columbia | United States | Merriweather Post Pavilion | | |
| 13 June 1989 | Holmdel Township | United States | Garden State Arts Center | | |
| 14 June 1989 | Holmdel Township | United States | Garden State Arts Center | | |
| 16 June 1989 | Buffalo | United States | Buffalo Memorial Auditorium | | |
| 17 June 1989 | Cuyahoga Falls | United States | Blossom Music Center | | |
| 18 June 1989 | Noblesville | United States | Deer Creek Music Center | 10,085 / 12,000 | $162,076 |
| 27 June 1989 | St. Louis | United States | The Muny | 9,915 / 9,915 | $180,698 |
| 28 June 1989 | Memphis | United States | Mid-South Coliseum | 10,149 / 11,000 | $172,533 |
| 30 June 1989 | Jackson | United States | Mississippi Coliseum | 9,434 / 9,434 | $160,378 |
| 2 July 1989 | Cincinnati | United States | Riverbend Music Center | | |
| 3 July 1989 | Atlanta | United States | Six Flags Over Georgia | Sold Out | Sold Out |
| 5 July 1989 | Clarkston | United States | Pine Knob Music Theatre | | |
| 6 July 1989 | Clarkston | United States | Pine Knob Music Theatre | | |
| 7 July 1989 | Milwaukee | United States | Marcus Amphitheater | 24,869 / 24,869 | |
| 9 July 1989 | Chapel Hill | United States | Dean Smith Center | | |
| 10 July 1989 | Winnipeg | Canada | Winnipeg Arena | | |
| 11 July 1989 | Saskatoon | Canada | Saskatchewan Place | 10,569 / 10,569 | $240,813 |
| 12 July 1989 | Calgary | Canada | Olympic Saddledome | | |
| 15 July 1989 | George | United States | The Gorge Amphitheatre | 11,763 / 12,000 | $210,240 |
| 16 July 1989 | Vancouver | Canada | BC Place | 20,283 / 27,000 | $475,550 |
| 21 July 1989 | Mountain View | United States | Shoreline Amphitheatre | 12,885 / 20,000 | $243,089 |
| 22 July 1989 | Sacramento | United States | Cal Expo Amphitheatre | 9,343 / 10,000 | $182,596 |
| 23 July 1989 | Concord | United States | Concord Pavilion | | |
| 31 July 1989 | Los Angeles | United States | Hollywood Bowl | 17,959 / 17,959 | $439,890 |
| 1 August 1989 | San Diego | United States | Sports Arena | | |
| 3 August 1989 | Atlantic City | United States | Bally's Grandstand | 7,600 / 7,600 | $218,696 |
| 4 August 1989 | Atlantic City | United States | Bally's Grandstand | 7,600 / 7,600 | $218,696 |
| 5 August 1989 | Boston | United States | Wang Theatre | | |
| 8 August 1989 | Old Orchard Beach | United States | The Ball Park | 12,714 / 15,000 | $257,459 |
| 10 August 1989 | Bristol | United States | | | |
| 11 August 1989 | East Rutherford | United States | Brendan Byrne Arena | 19,300 / 19,300 | $386,000 |
| 13 August 1989 | St. John's | Canada | Quidi Vidi Park | 30,000 | |

== Personnel ==
- Rod Stewart – vocals
- Stevie Salas – guitars (first North American leg)
- Jeff Golub – guitars (both North American legs)
- Steve Farris – guitars, backing vocals (South American leg)
- Todd Sharp – guitars, backing vocals (South American and second North American legs)
- Carmine Rojas – bass, backing vocals
- Tony Brock – drums
- Chuck Kentis – keyboards
- Jimmy Roberts – saxophone
- Nick Lane – trombone
- Rick Braun – trumpet, keyboards
