= Beryl Marsden =

English R&B and pop singer (born 1947)

- Born: Beryl Hogg; 10 June 1947 (age 78); Toxteth, Liverpool, Lancashire, England
- Genres: R&B, beat music, pop
- Years active: 1962–1980s

Beryl Marsden (born 10 June 1947) is a British R&B and pop singer, who first came to notice on the Liverpool club scene of the early 1960s. She recorded a number of "powerful and soulful", but unsuccessful, records, and has been described as "undeservedly neglected".

== Life and career ==
She was born Beryl Hogg in the Toxteth area of Liverpool, Lancashire, England, one of a family of 10 children. She began singing as a child, and at the age of 14 won a local talent competition. She was invited to join local band the Undertakers, but was too young to travel with them to club dates in Hamburg. Instead, she started singing with local group Howie Casey and the Crew, often performing at the Cavern Club. Although she took the stage name Beryl Marsden, she was not related to musician Gerry Marsden.

In 1963 she started appearing at the Star Club in Hamburg, and on her return to Britain moved to London, where she was managed by Tony Stratton Smith and was signed as a solo singer by Decca Records. She recorded two singles for them, a cover of Barbara George's "I Know (You Don't Love Me No More)", followed by a version of the Supremes' "When the Lovelight Starts Shining Through His Eyes". However, neither was successful.

She supported the Beatles on their last UK tour in 1965 and in that same year was signed to the Columbia label. There, she released two singles that year, "Who You Gonna Hurt?", and "Music Talk". The B-side of the latter was a version of the Irma Thomas song "Breakaway" (later a hit for Tracey Ullman), arranged and produced by Ivor Raymonde. Her final solo single, "What’s She Got", was issued in April 1966.

In May 1966 she joined a new group, Shotgun Express, whose members also included Rod Stewart, Mick Fleetwood and guitarist Peter Green. After that group split up in early 1967, she joined all-female band The She Trinity before linking up with Liverpool musician Paddy Chambers to form the band Sinbad. In the 1970s, she also performed as a member of a group called Gambler, before forming the Beryl Marsden Band. She also worked as a session singer, recorded with former Shotgun Express member Phil Sawyer, and in the 1980s performed on stage with Martha Reeves and the Vandellas.

She released an album, One Dream in 2004, the single "Baby It's You" in 2007, and another single "Too Late" in 2008. Some of her 1960s recordings have also been reissued on compilation albums.

On 10 and 11 June 2013, a musical, One Dream: The Beryl Marsden Story was staged at the Cavern Club, only the second time that a theatrical show had been performed at the club. The musical ran for two nights, with Marsden performing at the end of the show.

In 2014, she was portrayed by Gemma Sutton in Cilla, a three-part television drama series about Cilla Black.

== Discography ==
=== Singles ===
- "I Know (You Don't Love Me No More)" / "I Only Care About You", Decca F11707, 1963
- "When the Lovelight Starts Shining Through His Eyes" / "Love Is Going To Happen To Me", Decca F11818, 1964
- "Who You Gonna Hurt?" / "Gonna Make Him My Baby", Columbia DB 7718 (Capitol 5552 in the U.S), 1965 (A-side reached the NME Top 30)(#15 in Canada)
- "Music Talk" / "Break-A-Way", Columbia DB7797, 1965
- "What’s She Got?" / "Let’s Go Somewhere", Columbia DB 7888, 1966
- "I Video" / "Hungry For You", PVK Records PV107, 1981
- "Baby It's You", Lone Boy Records LBMCD08, 2007
- "Too Late / Everything I Need", Lone Boy Records, 2008
