= Every Beat of My Heart Tour =

1986 concert tour by Rod Stewart

- Tour by Rod Stewart
- Poster to the concert in Ostend, Belgium
- Location: Europe
- Associated album: Every Beat of My Heart
- Start date: 26 June 1986
- End date: 6 November 1986
- Legs: 1
- No. of shows: 64

Rod Stewart concert chronology
- Camouflage Tour (1984–1985); Every Beat of My Heart Tour (1986); Out of Order Tour (1988–1989)

The Every Beat of My Heart Tour was a European concert tour by British singer-songwriter Rod Stewart to promote his album Every Beat of My Heart. The tour began on 26 June 1986 in Belfast and ended on 6 November 1986 in Brighton with the 64th performance.

== Tour dates ==
Date	City	Country	Venue
Europe
26 June 1986	Belfast	Northern Ireland	King's Hall
27 June 1986	Belfast	Northern Ireland	King's Hall
30 June 1986	Glasgow	Scotland	Scottish Exhibition and Conference Centre
1 July 1986	Glasgow	Scotland	Scottish Exhibition and Conference Centre
2 July 1986	Birmingham	England	National Exhibition Centre
3 July 1986	Birmingham	England	National Exhibition Centre
5 July 1986	London	England	Wembley Stadium
7 July 1986	Paris	France	Hippodrome de Vincennes
8 July 1986	Bordeaux	France	Patinoire de Mériadeck
10 July 1986	Lorient	France	Stade du Moustoir
12 July 1986	Dortmund	West Germany	Westfalenhallen
13 July 1986	Stuttgart	West Germany	Hanns-Martin-Schleyer-Halle
17 July 1986	Rome	Italy	Stadio Flaminio
1 August 1986	Montpellier	France	Zénith de Montpellier
5 August 1986	Annecy-le-Vieux	France	Stade Annecy-le-Vieux
6 August 1986	Nice	France	Stade de l'Ouest
8 August 1986	Klagenfurt	Austria	Wörthersee Stadion
10 August 1986	Ostend	Belgium	Ostend Lunchtaven (Beach Belga Festival)
12 August 1986	Hamburg	West Germany	Alsterdorfer Sporthalle
13 August 1986	Hamburg	West Germany	Alsterdorfer Sporthalle
15 August 1986	Copenhagen	Denmark	Idrætsparken
16 August 1986	Stockholm	Sweden	Råsunda Stadium
17 August 1986	Budapest	Hungary	Népstadion
23 August 1986	Gothenburg	Sweden	Scandinavium
26 August 1986	Hanover	West Germany	Eilenriedehalle
28 August 1986	Berlin	West Germany	Waldbühne
30 August 1986	Sankt Wendel	West Germany	Bosenbach Stadion (Open Air St. Wendel)
31 August 1986	Lausanne	Switzerland	CIG de Malley
2 September 1986	Rotterdam	Netherlands	Rotterdam Ahoy
3 September 1986	Rotterdam	Netherlands	Rotterdam Ahoy
5 September 1986	Munich	West Germany	Olympiahalle
6 September 1986	Vienna	Austria	Wiener Stadthalle
10 September 1986	Turin	Italy	Stadio Comunale di Torino
11 September 1986	Milan	Italy	Palatrussardi
12 September 1986	Verona	Italy	Verona Arena
15 September 1986	Birmingham	England	National Exhibition Centre
16 September 1986	Birmingham	England	National Exhibition Centre
18 September 1986	London	England	Wembley Arena
19 September 1986	London	England	Wembley Arena
21 September 1986	Dublin	Ireland	RDS Arena
22 September 1986	Dublin	Ireland	RDS Arena
24 September 1986	London	England	Wembley Arena
25 September 1986	London	England	Wembley Arena
5 October 1986	San Sebastián	Spain	Velódromo de Anoeta
7 October 1986	Madrid	Spain	Las Ventas
9 October 1986	Barcelona	Spain	La Monumental
11 October 1986	Marbella	Spain	Estadio Municipal de Marbella
13 October 1986	Toulouse	France	Palais des Sports de Toulouse
16 October 1986	Zurich	Switzerland	Hallenstadion
17 October 1986	Heidelberg	West Germany	Rhein-Neckar-Halle
19 October 1986	Brussels	Belgium	Forest National
20 October 1986	Paris	France	Palais Omnisports de Paris-Bercy
21 October 1986	Frankfurt	West Germany	Eissporthalle Frankfurt
23 October 1986	Bremen	West Germany	Stadthalle Bremen
24 October 1986	Berlin	West Germany	Deutschlandhalle
25 October 1986	Kassel	West Germany	Eissporthalle Kassel
27 October 1986	Kiel	West Germany	Ostseehalle
28 October 1986	Düsseldorf	West Germany	Philips Halle
30 October 1986	Würzburg	West Germany	Carl-Diem-Halle
31 October 1986	Stuttgart	West Germany	Hanns-Martin-Schleyer-Halle
2 November 1986	Bournemouth	England	Bournemouth International Centre
3 November 1986	Bournemouth	England	Bournemouth International Centre
5 November 1986	Brighton	England	Brighton Centre
6 November 1986	Brighton	England	Brighton Centre

Rescheduled and cancelled shows

19 July 1986	Milan	Velodromo Vigorelli	Rescheduled to 11 September 1986 and moved to Palatrussardi.
20 July 1986	Genoa	Palasport di Genova	Cancelled.
23 July 1986	Barcelona	Plaza de Toros Monumental	Rescheduled to 9 October 1986.
25 July 1986	Madrid	Plaza de Toros de Las Ventas	Rescheduled to 7 October 1986.
27 July 1986	Marbella	Estadio Municipal de Marbella	Rescheduled to 11 October 1986.
30 July 1986	Bilbao	Pabellón Municipal de Deportes La Casilla	Rescheduled to 5 October 1986 and moved to Velódromo de Anoeta in San Sebastián.

== Set list ==
1. She Won't Dance with Me
2. Hot Legs
3. Tonight I'm Yours
4. Tonight's the Night (Gonna Be Alright)
5. Passion
6. Some Guys Have All the Luck (The Persuaders cover)
7. I Don't Want to Talk About It
8. You're in My Heart (The Final Acclaim)
9. Young Turks
10. Infatuation
11. (Sittin' On) The Dock of the Bay (Otis Redding cover)
12. Love Touch
13. Maggie May
14. Every Beat of My Heart
15. Da Ya Think I'm Sexy?
16. Baby Jane
17. Sailing (Sutherland Brothers cover)

Encore:

18. Sweet Little Rock and Roller (Chuck Berry cover)
19. Twistin' the Night Away (Sam Cooke cover)
20. We'll Meet Again (Vera Lynn cover)
21. Stay with Me (The Faces cover)

== Personnel ==
- Rod Stewart – vocals
- Jim Cregan – guitars, vocals
- Robin Le Mesurier – guitars, vocals
- John Corey – guitars and keyboards
- Charlie Harrison – bass, vocals
- Tony Brock – drums
- Kevin Savigar – keyboards
- Jimmy Roberts – saxophone
- Nick Lane – trombone
- Michael Chichowicz – horns
