= In Existence =

Studio album by Beautiful World
- Released: 1994
- Recorded: 1994
- Genre: New-age
- Length: 73:47
- Label: Warner
- Producer: Phil Sawyer

Beautiful World chronology
In Existence (1994)	Forever (1996)

In Existence is an album by English new-age musician Phil Sawyer under the artistic name Beautiful World.

== Track listing ==
No.	Title	Length
1.	"In the Beginning" (5)	3:57
2.	"In Existence" (1)	4:17
3.	"Evolution" (4)	5:49
4.	"Magicien du Bonheur" (3)	5:48
5.	"I Know" (2)	5:06
6.	"The Silk Road" (4)	6:05
7.	"Love Song" (1)	6:05
8.	"Journey of the Ancestors" (4)	8:26
9.	"Revolution of the Heart" (2)	5:42
10.	"The Coming of Age" (4)	6:08
11.	"Spoken Word" (2)	7:34
12.	"Wonderful World" (1)	3:39
13.	"The Final Emotion" (4)	4:46

Notes:

^{1} lyrics in Swahili
^{2} lyrics in English
^{3} lyrics in French
^{4} instrumental
^{5} lyrics in Hopi

== Production ==
- Producer: Phil Sawyer
- Programmer: Andy Gray
- Publisher: EMI-Music Publishing

== Charts ==
=== Weekly charts ===
Chart (1994)	Peak position
German Albums (Offizielle Top 100)	9
Swiss Albums (Schweizer Hitparade)	35

=== Year-end charts ===
Chart (1994)	Position
German Albums (Offizielle Top 100)	69

== Certifications ==
Region	Certification	Certified units/sales
Poland (ZPAV)	Gold	50,000^{*}
^{*} Sales figures based on certification alone.
