= Forever (Beautiful World album) =

Studio album by Beautiful World
- Released: 1996
- Recorded: 1996
- Genre: New-age
- Length: 62:35
- Label: Warner
- Producer: Phil Sawyer

Beautiful World chronology
In Existence (1994)	Forever (1996)

Forever is an album by English new-age musician Phil Sawyer, working together with the Malcolm Sargent Festival Choir under the artistic name Beautiful World.

The album received a 1.5 star rating from AllMusic.

== Track listing ==
No.	Title	Length
1.	"Pepo Iko"	5:12
2.	"Children of the Future"	4:38
3.	"Eternally"	5:41
4.	"Fearless"	4:37
5.	"Love Is Everything"	4:57
6.	"Pana Kama Dunia"	5:22
7.	"Oh Beautiful Paradise"	5:23
8.	"Forever"	4:44
9.	"Hell Bent on Misery"	4:23
10.	"I'll Be There"	4:16
11.	"Africa"	5:09
12.	"The Healing"	8:04
Total length:		63:46

Notes

- Tracks 1–3, 5–7 — in Swahili
- Tracks 4, 8–11 — in English
- Track 12 — instrumental

== Production ==
- Producer: Phil Sawyer
- Programmer: Andy Gray
- Publisher: Accorder Music Publishing
