= From Gasoline Alley to Another Country: Hits 2016 =

2016–17 concert tour by Rod Stewart

- Tour by Rod Stewart
- Location: Europe
- Associated album: Another Country
- Start date: 4 November 2016
- End date: 27 February 2017
- Legs: 1
- No. of shows: 20

Rod Stewart concert chronology
- Hits 2016 (2016); From Gasoline Alley to Another Country: Hits 2016 (2016–2017); Summer Tour 2017 (2017)

From Gasoline Alley to Another Country: Hits 2016 was a concert tour by British musician Rod Stewart in support of his twenty-ninth studio album Another Country.

== Background ==
The tour began on 7 November 2016, in Prague, Czech Republic at the O_{2} Arena and continued throughout Europe, the United Kingdom and Ireland before concluding on 16 December 2016, in Glasgow, Scotland at the SSE Hydro Arena. Currently, the tour is planned to travel across Europe, the United Kingdom and Ireland with a total of sixteen shows.

== Shows ==
Date	City	Country	Venue	Attendance	Box Office
Europe
4 November 2016	Stuttgart	Germany	Hanns-Martin-Schleyer-Halle	—	—
7 November 2016	Prague	Czech Republic	O_{2} Arena	—	—
9 November 2016	Vienna	Austria	Wiener Stadthalle	—	—
12 November 2016	Liverpool	England	Echo Arena Liverpool	—	—
14 November 2016	Belfast	Northern Ireland	SSE Arena Belfast	15,478 / 15,478	$1,486,890
15 November 2016	Belfast	Northern Ireland	SSE Arena Belfast	15,478 / 15,478	$1,486,890
18 November 2016	Dublin	Ireland	3Arena	17,032 / 17,032	$1,967,170
19 November 2016	Dublin	Ireland	3Arena	17,032 / 17,032	$1,967,170
29 November 2016	Sheffield	England	Sheffield Arena	10,825 / 10,825	$980,343
2 December 2016	Birmingham	England	Barclaycard Arena	25,267 / 25,267	$2,320,100
3 December 2016	Birmingham	England	Barclaycard Arena	25,267 / 25,267	$2,320,100
6 December 2016	Leeds	England	First Direct Arena	11,137 / 11,137	$966,451
8 December 2016	Manchester	England	Manchester Arena	14,120 / 14,120	$1,270,890
10 December 2016	Nottingham	England	Motorpoint Arena Nottingham	—	—
12 December 2016	London	England	The O_{2} Arena	—	—
13 December 2016	Glasgow	Scotland	The SSE Hydro	22,166 / 22,509	$2,009,040
16 December 2016	Glasgow	Scotland	The SSE Hydro	22,166 / 22,509	$2,009,040
18 December 2016	Liverpool	England	Echo Arena Liverpool	—	—
26 February 2017	London	England	The O_{2} Arena	29,427 / 31,359	$2,695,020
27 February 2017	London	England	The O_{2} Arena	29,427 / 31,359	$2,695,020
TOTAL				145,392 / 147,727 (97%)	$13,695,904

=== Cancellations and rescheduled shows ===
22 November 2016	London	The O_{2} Arena	Rescheduled to 12 December 2016.
25 November 2016	London	The O_{2} Arena	Rescheduled to 26 February 2017.
26 November 2016	London	The O_{2} Arena	Rescheduled to 27 February 2017.
