= The Voice, The Guitar, The Songs Tour =

2014 concert tour by Santana and Rod Stewart

- Tour by Santana & Rod Stewart
- Start date: May 23, 2014
- End date: August 20, 2014
- Legs: 2
- No. of shows: 18
Santana tour chronology
Corazón Tour (2014)	The Voice, The Guitar, The Songs Tour (2014)	Corazón Tour (2014–2015)
Rod Stewart tour chronology
Live the Life Tour (2013)	The Voice, The Guitar, The Songs Tour (2014)	The Hits Tour (2014–2015)

The Voice, The Guitar, The Songs Tour was a co-headlining concert tour by Latin rock band Santana and Rod Stewart. The tour began on May 23, 2014, and ended on August 20, 2014, with a time-out for most of the month of June, during which Stewart headlined the Rod Stewart Live tour which played five United Kingdom venues, and for all but the last day of July. The tour had $6,100,000 in sales.

== Tour dates ==
Date	City	Country	Venue	Tickets sold / Available	Revenue
North America
May 23, 2014	Albany	United States	Times Union Center		
May 25, 2014	Uncasville	United States	Mohegan Sun Arena		
May 27, 2014	Pittsburgh	United States	Consol Energy Center	13,000 / 13,000	
May 31, 2014	Buffalo	United States	First Niagara Center		
June 3, 2014	Louisville	United States	KFC Yum! Center		
June 6, 2014	St. Louis	United States	Scottrade Center		
June 7, 2014	Lincoln	United States	Pinnacle Bank Arena		
July 31, 2014	Eugene	United States	Matthew Knight Arena		
August 2, 2014	Vancouver	Canada	Rogers Arena	12,191 / 12,191	$1,093,946
August 4, 2014	Calgary	Canada	Scotiabank Saddledome	10,771 / 10,771	$949,822
August 5, 2014	Edmonton	Canada	Rexall Place	11,760 / 11,760	$1,040,421
August 8, 2014	Winnipeg	Canada	MTS Centre	10,621 / 10,621	$916,953
August 10, 2014	Saint Paul	United States	Xcel Energy Center		
August 12, 2014	Greenwood Village	United States	Fiddler's Green Amphitheatre		
August 14, 2014	Kansas City	United States	Sprint Center		
August 16, 2014	Rosemont	United States	Allstate Arena	11,852 / 11,852	$1,206,697
August 19, 2014	Washington, D.C.	United States	Verizon Center	12,155 / 12,155	$977,806
August 20, 2014	Wantagh	United States	Nikon at Jones Beach Theater		

Cancellations and rescheduled shows

May 30, 2014	Charlottesville	United States	John Paul Jones Arena	Cancelled
