= Live the Life (Fundisha song) =

Single by Fundisha

from the album Lessons
- Released: 2002
- Label: So So Def Recordings
- Songwriter(s): Fundisha Johnson, Jermaine Dupri.
- Producer(s): Jermaine Dupri

"Live the Life" is a 2002 song and debut single by Fundisha Johnson and features Jermaine Dupri. Co-written by Johnson and Dupri, Billboard called the song an "inspirational ditty about the ups and downs of life" with "a feel-good sound that is awfully catchy."

The song was first featured on the soundtrack to the film Hardball. It is also featured on her album Lessons, which was released by So So Def/Columbia Records.
