= Rod Stewart =

British singer-songwriter (born 1945)

Sir Rod Stewart CBE
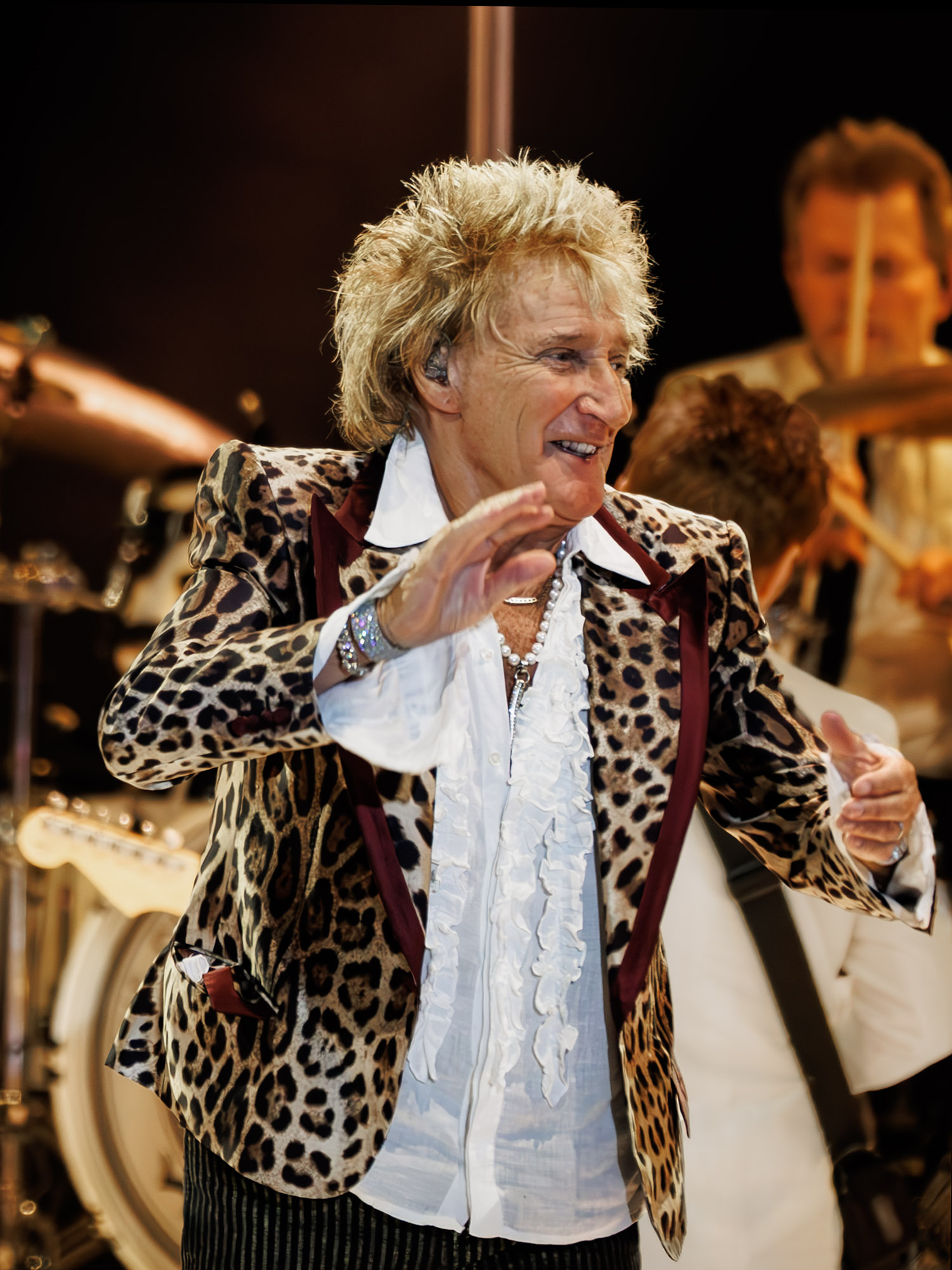
- Stewart in 2025
- Born: Roderick David Stewart; 10 January 1945 (age 81); Highgate, London, England
- Other name: Rod the Mod
- Occupations: Singer; songwriter; record producer; musician
- Years active: 1961–present
- Spouses: Alana Collins (m. 1979; div. 1984); Rachel Hunter (m. 1990; div. 2006); Penny Lancaster (m. 2007)
- Partners: Susannah Boffey (1963–1964); Jennie Rylance (1965–1967); Dee Harrington (1971–1975); Britt Ekland (1975–1977); Kelly Emberg (1983–1990)
- Children: 8; including Kimberly, Sean and Ruby
- Musical career
- Genres: Rock; pop
- Labels: Mercury; Warner Bros.; J; Universal; Capitol
- Member of: Faces
- Formerly of: The Jeff Beck Group; Shotgun Express; Steampacket
- Website: rodstewart.com

Sir Roderick David Stewart (born 10 January 1945) is a British singer and songwriter. Known for his distinctive raspy singing voice, Stewart is among the best-selling music artists of all time, having sold more than 120 million records worldwide. His music career began in 1962 when he took up busking with a harmonica. He was a member of various bands before joining the Jeff Beck Group in 1967. Joining Faces in 1969, he also launched a solo career, releasing his debut album, An Old Raincoat Won't Ever Let You Down, that year. Stewart's early albums were a fusion of rock, folk music, soul music, and R&B. His third album, 1971's Every Picture Tells a Story, was his breakthrough, topping the charts in the UK, US, Canada and Australia, as did its single "Maggie May". His 1972 follow-up album, Never a Dull Moment, also reached number one in the UK and Australia, while going top three in the US and Canada. Its single, "You Wear It Well", topped the UK chart and was a moderate hit elsewhere.

After Faces broke up in 1975, Stewart's commercial success continued, starting with the UK number-one album Atlantic Crossing and the ballad "Sailing". A Night on the Town (1976), his fifth straight chart-topper in the UK, began a three-album run of going number one or top three in the US, Canada, the UK and Australia with each release. That album's "Tonight's the Night (Gonna Be Alright)" spent almost two months at number one in the US and Canada, and made the top five in other countries. Foot Loose & Fancy Free (1977) contained the hit "You're in My Heart (The Final Acclaim)" as well as the rocker "Hot Legs". Blondes Have More Fun (1978) and its disco-tinged "Da Ya Think I'm Sexy?" both went to number one in Canada, Australia and the US, with "Da Ya Think I'm Sexy?" also hitting number one in the UK and the top ten in other countries. Stewart's albums regularly hit the upper levels of the charts in the Netherlands in the 1970s and in Sweden from 1975 onward.

After a disco and new wave period in the late 1970s and early 1980s, Stewart's music turned to a soft rock/middle-of-the-road style, with most of his albums reaching the top ten in the UK, Germany and Sweden, but faring less well in the US. The single "Rhythm of My Heart" was a top five hit in the UK, US and other countries, with its source album, 1991's Vagabond Heart, becoming, at number ten in the US and number two in the UK, his highest-charting album in a decade. In 1993, he collaborated with Bryan Adams and Sting on the power ballad "All for Love", which went to number one in many countries. In the early 2000s he released a series of successful albums which interpreted the Great American Songbook.

In 2008, Billboard magazine ranked Stewart the 17th most successful artist on the "Billboard Hot 100 All-Time Top Artists". A Grammy and Brit Award recipient, he was voted at No. 33 in Q Magazine's list of the Top 100 Greatest Singers of all time. As a solo artist, Stewart was inducted into the US Rock and Roll Hall of Fame in 1994 and the UK Music Hall of Fame in 2006, and he was inducted a second time into the Rock and Roll Hall of Fame in 2012 as a member of Faces. He has had 10 number-one albums and 31 top-ten singles in the UK, six of which reached number one. Stewart has had 16 top-ten singles in the US, with four reaching number one on the Billboard Hot 100. He was knighted in Britain's 2016 Birthday Honours for services to music and charity. Guitarist Steve Cropper said Stewart ranked alongside Otis Redding as "the finest singer with whom he had ever worked".

== Early life ==
Roderick David Stewart was born at 507 Archway Road, Highgate, North London, on 10 January 1945, the youngest of five children of Robert Joseph Stewart and Elsie Rebecca Gilbart. His father was Scottish and had been a master builder in Leith, Edinburgh. Elsie was English and had grown up in Upper Holloway, north London. Married in 1928, the couple had two sons and two daughters while living in Scotland and then moved to Highgate. Stewart's parents are buried in Highgate Cemetery.

Stewart was born at home during the Second World War, eight years after his nearest sibling. (Note: For many years it was said that Stewart had been born half an hour after a German V-2 missile warhead fell on the local Highgate police station. In his 2012 autobiography, Stewart said that was "just one of those legends, fables, and downright lies told in the name of publicity" and that the V-2 hit and his birth were separated by some weeks. There was a deadly V-2 strike very near the southern end of the Archway Road on 5 November 1944, some two miles from the Stewart domicile.) The family was neither affluent nor poor; Stewart was spoiled as the youngest, and has called his childhood "fantastically happy". He had an undistinguished record at Highgate Primary School and failed the eleven-plus exam. He then attended the William Grimshaw Secondary Modern School (later Fortismere School), Muswell Hill. When his father retired from the building trade he bought a newsagent's shop on the Archway Road and the family lived over the shop. Stewart's main hobby was railway modelling.

The family was mostly focused on football; Stewart's father had played in a local amateur team and managed some teams as well, and one of Stewart's earliest memories was of the pictures of Scottish players such as George Young and Gordon Smith that his brothers had on the wall. Stewart was the most talented footballer in the family and was a supporter of Arsenal at the time. Combining natural athleticism with near-reckless aggression, he became captain of the school football team and played for Middlesex Schoolboys as centre-half.

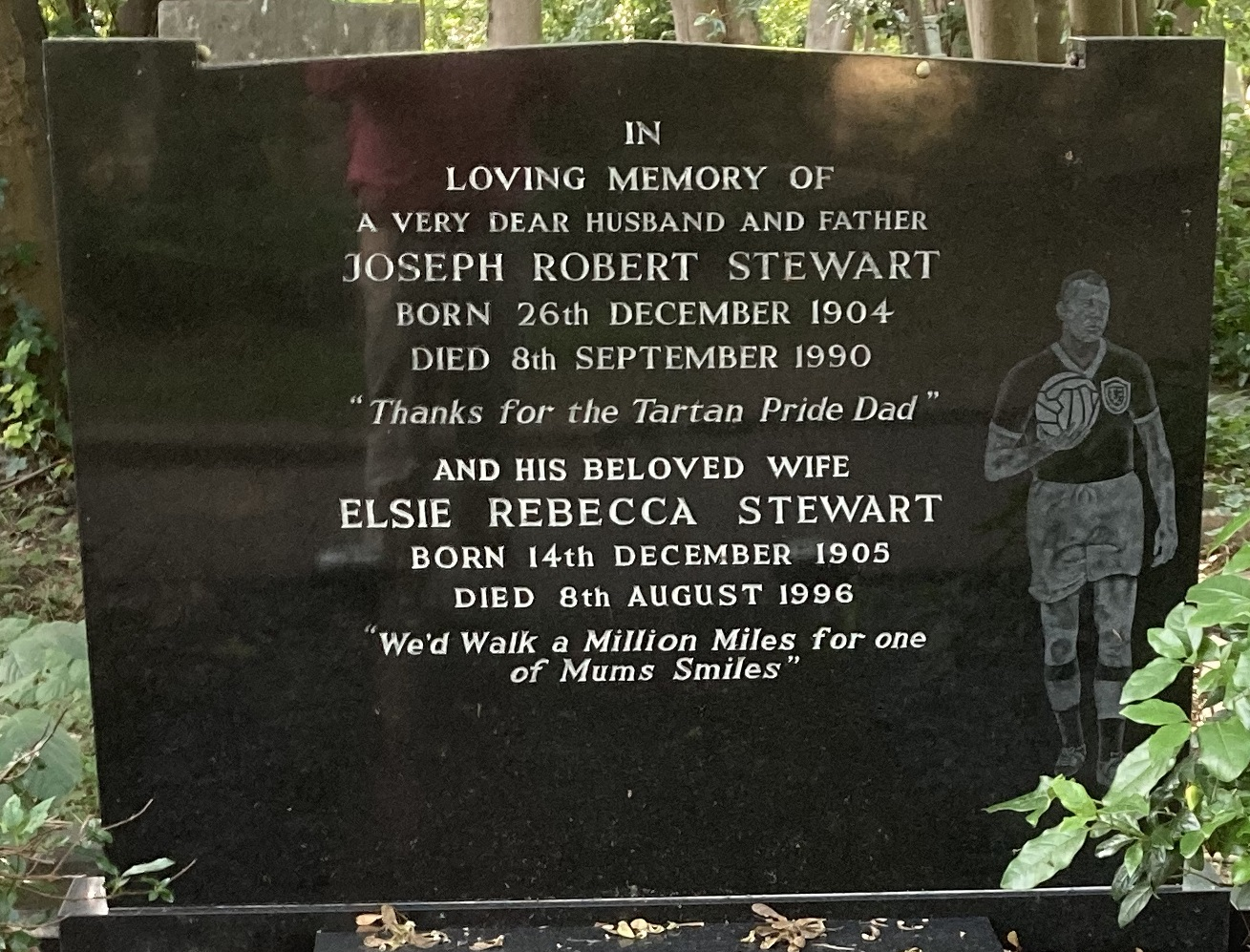
Grave of Stewart's parents in Highgate Cemetery

The family were also great fans of the singer Al Jolson and would sing and play his hits. Stewart collected his records and saw his films, read books about him, and was influenced by his performing style and attitude towards his audience. His introduction to rock and roll was hearing Little Richard's 1956 hit "The Girl Can't Help It", and seeing Bill Haley & His Comets in concert. His father bought him a guitar in January 1959 and the first song he learned was the folk tune "It Takes a Worried Man to Sing a Worried Song". The first record he bought was Eddie Cochran's "C'mon Everybody". In 1960, he joined a skiffle group with school friends called the Kool Kats, playing Lonnie Donegan and Chas McDevitt hits.

Stewart left school at the age of 15 and worked briefly as a silk-screen printer. Spurred on by his father, his ambition was to become a professional footballer. In summer 1960 he went for trials at Brentford, a Third Division club at the time. Contrary to some longstanding accounts, Stewart states in his 2012 autobiography that he was never signed to the club and that the club never called him back after his trials. (Note: Over the years, considerable backstory has accumulated about Stewart's involvement with Brentford F.C. It was said that he joined on as an apprentice with them, but disliked the early morning travel to West London and the daily assignment to clean the first team's boots. His playing effectiveness at centre-half was supposedly hindered by his slight build – 5 feet 11 inches (1.80 m) but only 9 stone (126 lb; 57 kg) – and he pushed himself so much that he occasionally vomited at the side of the pitch. One biography claimed he was there for two months including pre-season fixtures, that he left the team to the great disappointment of his father, and that he later reflected, "I had the skill but not the enthusiasm." Another biography gave an undated Stewart quote saying he was there for three weeks, paid £8 per seven-day week, but never played in any form. In a 2004 Rolling Stone interview, Stewart said he went three or four times a week and did play. In 1995, Brentford Deputy President Eric White was quoted as saying, "He trained with us for a week or two, and he may even have kicked a ball around with the juniors, but there is no record of Rod Stewart ever having signed to Brentford. Unfortunately, nobody at the club remembers his time here." In his 2012 autobiography, Stewart attributes all of this to a tale that took on its own life, partly and deliberately helped by statements he made in interviews, such as to talk show host Michael Parkinson.) Regarding possible career options, Stewart concluded, "Well, a musician's life is a lot easier and I can also get drunk and make music, and I can't do that and play football. I plumped for music ... They're the only two things I can do actually: play football and sing."

== Music career ==
=== 1961–1963: Early work and The Dimensions ===
Stewart worked in the family shop and as a newspaper delivery boy. He then worked briefly as a labourer for Highgate Cemetery, which became another part of his biographical lore. (Note: For many years it was said that Stewart had been a gravedigger at Highgate, partly to face a childhood fear of death. In his 2012 autobiography he said that was a tale he had gone along with, but that in fact he had only measured out plots with string during a couple of Saturdays.) He worked in a North Finchley funeral parlour and as a fence erector and sign writer. In 1961, he went to Denmark Street with the Raiders and got a singing audition with well-known record producer Joe Meek, but Meek stopped the session with a rude sound. Stewart began listening to British and American topical folk artists such as Ewan MacColl, Alex Campbell, Woody Guthrie, Ramblin' Jack Elliott, and especially Derroll Adams and the debut album of Bob Dylan.

Stewart became attracted to beatnik attitudes and left-wing politics, living for a while in a beatnik houseboat at Shoreham-by-Sea. He was an active supporter of the Campaign for Nuclear Disarmament at this time, joining the annual Aldermaston Marches from 1961 to 1963 and being arrested on three occasions when he took part in sit-ins at Trafalgar Square and Whitehall for the cause. He also used the marches as a way to meet and bed girls. In 1962, he had his first serious relationship, with London art student Suzannah Boffey (a friend of future model and actress Chrissie Shrimpton); he moved to a bed-sit in Muswell Hill to be near her. She became pregnant, but neither Rod nor his family wanted him to enter marriage; the baby girl was given up for adoption and Rod and Suzannah's relationship ended.

In 1962, Stewart began hanging around folk singer Wizz Jones, busking at Leicester Square and other London spots. Stewart took up playing the then-fashionable harmonica. On several trips over the next 18 months Jones and Stewart took their act to Brighton and then to Paris, sleeping under bridges over the River Seine, and then finally to Barcelona, from where he was deported from Spain for vagrancy in 1963. At this time, Stewart, who had been at William Grimshaw School with three of the members of the embryonic Kinks, was briefly considered as their singer.

In 1963, Stewart adopted the Mod lifestyle and look, and began fashioning the spiky rooster hairstyle that would become his trademark (it was made possible with sugar water or large amounts of his sisters' hair lacquer, backcombing, and his hands holding it in place to protect it from the winds of Highgate Underground station).) Disillusioned by rock and roll, he saw Otis Redding perform in concert and began listening to Sam Cooke records; he became fascinated by rhythm and blues and soul music.

After returning to London, Stewart joined a rhythm and blues group, the Dimensions, in October 1963, as a harmonica player and part-time vocalist. It was his first professional job as a musician, although he was still living at home and working in his brother's painting and picture-frame shop. A somewhat more established singer from Birmingham, Jimmy Powell, hired the group a few weeks later, and it became known as Jimmy Powell & the Five Dimensions (which also included bassist Louis Cennamo), with Stewart as harmonica player. The group performed weekly at the famed Studio 51 club on Great Newport Street in London, where the Rolling Stones often headlined; this was Stewart's entrée into the thriving London R&B scene, and his harmonica playing improved in part from watching Mick Jagger on stage. Relations soon broke down between Powell and Stewart over roles within the group and Stewart departed. Contrary to popular legend, during this time Stewart probably did not play harmonica on Millie Small's 1964 hit "My Boy Lollipop"; that was probably Peter Hogman of the Dimensions, although Powell has also claimed credit. Powell did record and release a single during this period, though Stewart did not appear on it.

=== 1964–1967: Steampacket and "Rod the Mod" image ===
In January 1964, (Note: A much-written-about happenstance, some sources give the date of the Stewart–Baldry rail station meeting as 5 January, some as 7 January (but that may be confusing it with the date of Cyril Davies' death), some imply that it is after 7 January, while some sources give no specific date.) while Stewart was waiting at Twickenham railway station after having seen Long John Baldry and the All Stars at Eel Pie Island, Baldry heard him playing "Smokestack Lightnin'" on his harmonica, and invited him to sit in with the group; when Baldry discovered Stewart was a singer as well, he offered him a job for £35 a week, after securing the approval of Stewart's mother. Quitting his day job at the age of nineteen, Stewart gradually overcame his shyness and nerves and became a visible enough part of the act that he was sometimes added to the billing as "Rod the Mod" Stewart, the nickname coming from his dandyish style of grooming and dress. Baldry touted Stewart's abilities to Melody Maker magazine and the group enjoyed a weekly residence at London's fabled Marquee Club. In June 1964, Stewart made his recording debut (without label credit) on "Up Above My Head", the B-side to a Baldry and Hoochie Coochie Men single. While still with Baldry, Stewart embarked on a simultaneous solo career. He made some demo recordings, (Note: The demo recordings were later released in 1976, against Stewart's wishes.) was scouted by Decca Records at the Marquee Club, and signed to a solo contract in August 1964. He appeared on several regional television shows around the country and recorded his first single in September 1964.

Turning down Decca's recommended material as too commercial, Stewart insisted that the experienced session musicians he was given, including John Paul Jones, learn a couple of Sonny Boy Williamson songs he had just heard. The resulting single, "Good Morning Little Schoolgirl", was recorded and released in October 1964. Stewart performed it on the popular television show Ready Steady Go!, but it did not enter the charts. Also in October, Stewart left the Hoochie Coochie Men after having a row with Baldry.

Stewart played some dates on his own in late 1964 and early 1965, sometimes backed by the Southampton R&B outfit the Soul Agents. The Hoochie Coochie Men broke up, Baldry and Stewart patched up their differences (and became lifelong friends), and music manager Giorgio Gomelsky put together Steampacket, with Baldry, Stewart, Brian Auger, Julie Driscoll, Micky Waller, Vic Briggs and Ricky Fenson; their first appearance was in support of the Rolling Stones in July 1965. The group was conceived as a white soul revue, analogous to The Ike & Tina Turner Revue, with multiple vocalists and styles ranging from jazz to R&B to blues. Steampacket toured with the Stones and the Walker Brothers that summer, ending in the London Palladium; seeing the audience react to the Stones gave Stewart his first exposure to crowd hysteria. Stewart, who had been included in the group upon Baldry's insistence, ended up with most of the male vocal parts. Steampacket was unable to enter the studio to record any material because its members all belonged to different labels and managers, although Gomelsky did record one of their Marquee Club rehearsals. (Note: These later surfaced in 1971 as part of Gomelsky's Rock Generation releases on BYG Records; the poorly recorded material has been repackaged as Rod Stewart and Steampacket many times since.)

Stewart's "Rod the Mod" image gained wider visibility in November 1965, when he was the subject of a 30-minute Rediffusion, London television documentary titled "An Easter with Rod" that portrayed the Mod scene. His parallel solo career attempts continued on EMI's Columbia label with the November 1965 release of "The Day Will Come", a more heavily arranged pop attempt, and the April 1966 release of his take on Sam Cooke's "Shake", with the Brian Auger Trinity. Both failed commercially, and neither gained positive notices. Stewart had spent the better part of two years listening mostly to Cooke; he later said, "I didn't sound like anybody at all ... but I knew I sounded a bit like Sam Cooke, so I listened to Sam Cooke." This recording solidified that singer's position as Stewart's idol and most enduring influence; he called it a "crossing of the water".

Stewart left Steampacket in March 1966, with Stewart saying he had been sacked and Auger saying he had quit. Stewart then joined a somewhat similar outfit, Shotgun Express, in May 1966 as co-lead vocalist with Beryl Marsden. The other members included Mick Fleetwood and Peter Green (who went on to form Fleetwood Mac), and Peter Bardens. Shotgun Express released one unsuccessful single in October 1966, the orchestra-heavy "I Could Feel The Whole World Turn Round", before disbanding. Stewart later disparaged Shotgun Express as a poor imitation of Steampacket and said, "I was still getting this terrible feeling of doing other people's music. I think you can only start finding yourself when you write your own material." By now, Stewart had bounced around without achieving much success, with little to distinguish himself among other aspiring London singers other than the emerging rasp in his voice.

=== 1967–1969: Jeff Beck Group period ===
Guitarist Jeff Beck recruited Stewart for his new post-Yardbirds venture, and in February 1967, Stewart joined the Jeff Beck Group as vocalist and sometime songwriter. This would become the big break of his early career. There he first played with Ronnie Wood whom he had first met in a London pub in 1964; the two soon became fast friends. During its first year, the group experienced frequent changes of drummers and conflicts involving manager Mickie Most wanting to reduce Stewart's role. They toured the UK and released a couple of singles that featured Stewart on their B-sides. Stewart's sputtering solo career also continued with the March 1968 release of non-hit "Little Miss Understood" on Immediate Records.

The Jeff Beck Group toured Western Europe in spring 1968, recorded, and were nearly destitute. Then assistant manager Peter Grant booked them on a six-week tour of the United States starting in June 1968 with the Fillmore East in New York. Stewart, on his first trip to America, suffered terrible stage fright during the opening show and hid behind the amplifier banks while singing. Only a quick shot of brandy brought him out front. Nevertheless, the show and the tour were a big success, with Robert Shelton of The New York Times calling the group exciting and praising "the interaction of Mr. Beck's wild and visionary guitar against the hoarse and insistent shouting of Rod Stewart", and New Musical Express reporting that the group was receiving standing ovations and pulling receipts equal to those of Jimi Hendrix and the Doors.

In August 1968, their first album, Truth, was released, and by October, it had risen to number 15 on the US albums chart but failed to chart in the UK. The album featured Beck's masterly guitar technique and manipulated sounds as Stewart's dramatic vocalising tackled the group's varied repertoire of blues, folk, rock, and proto-heavy metal. Stewart also co-wrote three of the songs and credited the record for helping to develop his vocal abilities and the sandpaper quality in his voice. The group toured America again at the end of the year to a strong reception, then suffered from more personnel upheaval (something that would continue throughout Beck's career). In July 1969, Stewart left following his friend Wood's departure. Stewart later recalled, "It was a great band to sing with, but I couldn't take all the aggravation and unfriendliness that developed.... In the two and a half years I was with Beck I never once looked him in the eye – I always looked at his shirt or something like that."

The group's second album, Beck-Ola, was released in June 1969 in the US and in September 1969 in the UK, bracketing the time the group was dissolving; it also made number 15 in the US albums chart and reached number 39 in the UK albums chart. During his time with the group, Stewart initially felt overmatched by Beck's presence, and his style was still developing; but later Stewart felt the two developed a strong musical, if not personal, rapport. Much of Stewart's sense of phrasing was developed during his time with the Jeff Beck Group. Beck sought to form a new supergroup with Carmine Appice and Tim Bogert (of the similarly just-breaking-up Vanilla Fudge) joining him and Stewart, but Stewart had other plans.

=== 1969–1975: Solo career established and Faces albums ===
Mercury Records A&R man Lou Reizner had seen Stewart perform with Beck, and on 8 October 1968 signed him to a solo contract; but contractual complexities delayed Stewart's recording for him until July 1969. Meanwhile, in May 1969, guitarist and singer Steve Marriott left English band the Small Faces. Ron Wood replaced him as guitarist in June and on 18 October 1969, Stewart followed his friend and became the band's new singer. The two joined existing members Ronnie Lane, Ian McLagan, and Kenney Jones, who soon decided to call the new line-up Faces.

An Old Raincoat Won't Ever Let You Down became Stewart's first solo album in 1969 (it was known as The Rod Stewart Album in the US). It established the template for his solo sound: a heartfelt mixture of folk, rock, and country blues, inclusive of a British working-class sensibility, with both original material ("Cindy's Lament" and the title song) and cover versions (Ewan MacColl's "Dirty Old Town" and Mike d'Abo's "Handbags and Gladrags"). The backing band on the album included Wood, Waller and McLagan, plus Keith Emerson and guitarists Martin Pugh (of Steamhammer, and later Armageddon and 7th Order) and Martin Quittenton (also from Steamhammer).

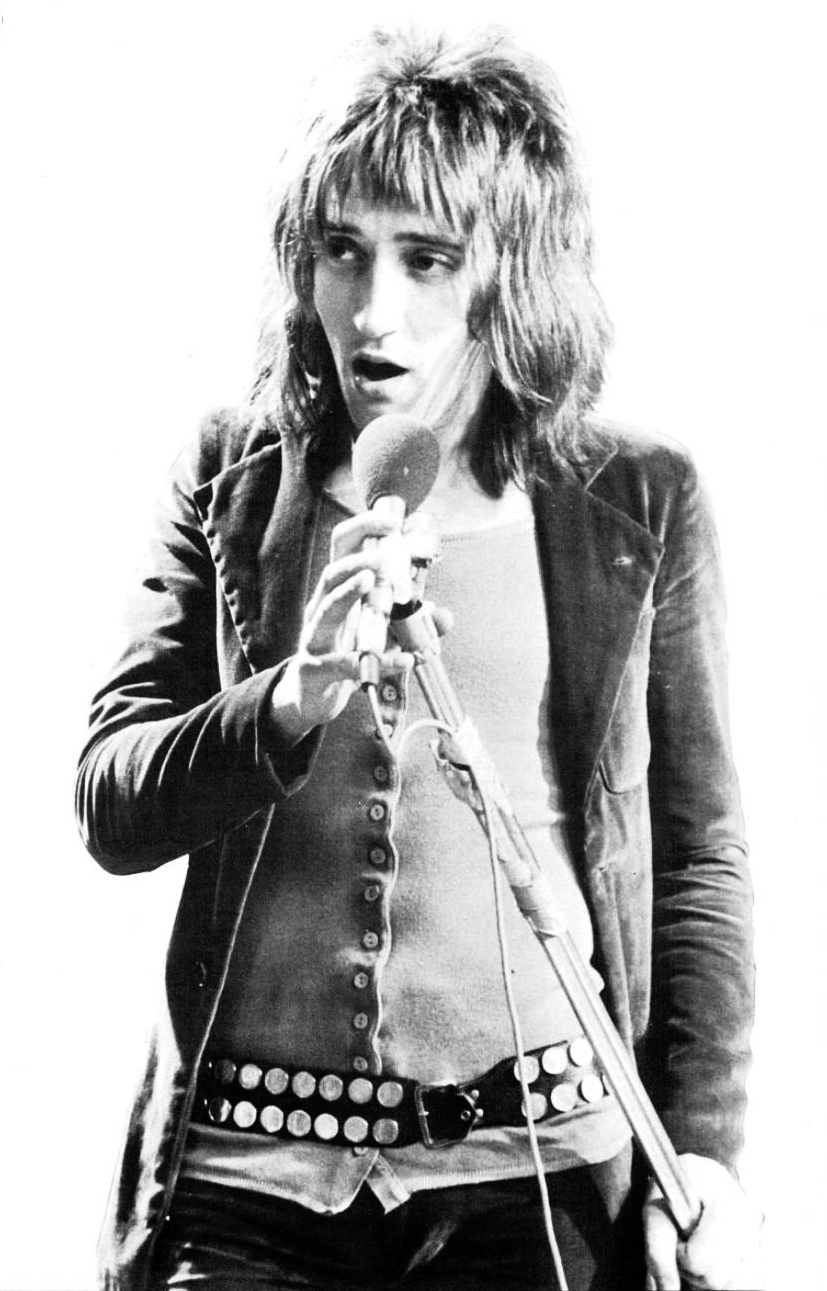
Stewart in a trade advert for his 1971 album Every Picture Tells A Story

Faces released their debut album, First Step, in early 1970 with a rock and roll style similar to the Rolling Stones. While the album did better in the UK than in the US, the Faces quickly earned a strong live following. Stewart released his second album, Gasoline Alley that autumn. Stewart's approach was similar to his first album and mandolin was introduced into the sound. He then launched a US tour with the Faces. Stewart sang guest vocals for the Australian group Python Lee Jackson on "In a Broken Dream", recorded in April 1969 but not released until 1970. His payment was a set of seat covers for his car. It was re-released in 1972 to become a worldwide hit.

Stewart's 1971 solo album Every Picture Tells a Story made him a household name when the B-side of his minor hit "Reason to Believe", "Maggie May", (co-written with Martin Quittenton) started to receive radio play. The album and the single occupied the number one chart position simultaneously in the UK, US, Canada and Australia, a chart first, in September. Maggie May topped the single chart for five weeks in the US, and the UK and four weeks in Australia. Set off by a striking mandolin part (by Ray Jackson of Lindisfarne), "Maggie May" was also named in The Rock and Roll Hall of Fame's 500 Songs that Shaped Rock and Roll. The rest of the album was equally strong, with "Mandolin Wind" again showcasing that instrument; "(I Know) I'm Losing You" adding hard-edged soul to the mix; and "Tomorrow Is a Long Time", a cover of a Bob Dylan song. But the ultimate manifestation of the early Stewart solo style was the Stewart-Wood-penned "Every Picture Tells a Story" itself: powered by Mick Waller's drumming, Pete Sears's piano and Wood's guitar work in a largely acoustic arrangement; it is a song relating to the picaresque adventures of the singer.

The second Faces album, Long Player, was released in early 1971 and enjoyed greater chart success than First Step. Faces also got their only US Top 40 hit with "Stay With Me" from their third album A Nod Is as Good as a Wink...To a Blind Horse released in late 1971. This album reached the Top 10 on both sides of the Atlantic on the back of the success of Every Picture Tells A Story. Steve Jones from The Sex Pistols regarded the Faces highly and named them as a main influence on the British punk rock movement.

The Faces toured extensively in 1972 with growing tension in the band over Stewart's solo career enjoying more success than the band's. Stewart released Never a Dull Moment in the same year. Repeating the Every Picture formula, for the most part, it reached number two on the US album charts and number one in the UK, and enjoyed further good notices from reviewers. "You Wear It Well" was a hit single that reached number 13 in the US and went to number one in the UK, while "Twisting the Night Away" made explicit Stewart's debt to Sam Cooke.

For the body of his early solo work Stewart earned tremendous critical praise. Rolling Stone's 1980 Illustrated History of Rock & Roll includes this in its Stewart entry:

Rarely has a singer had as full and unique a talent as Rod Stewart; rarely has anyone betrayed his talent so completely. Once the most compassionate presence in music, he has become a bilious self-parody – and sells more records than ever [... A] writer who offered profound lyricism and fabulous self-deprecating humour, teller of tall tales and honest heartbreaker, he had an unmatched eye for the tiny details around which lives turn, shatter, and reform [...] and a voice to make those details indelible. [... His solo albums] were defined by two special qualities: warmth, which was redemptive, and modesty, which was liberating. If ever any rocker chose the role of everyman and lived up to it, it was Rod Stewart.

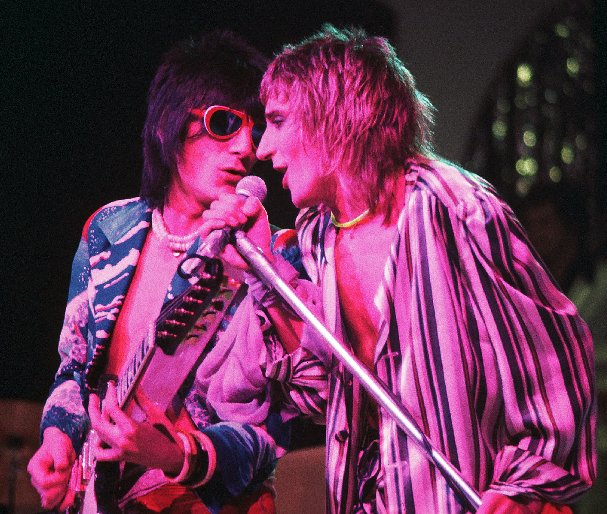
Stewart (right) while in Faces, with Ronnie Wood (left)

The Faces released their final album Ooh La La, which reached number one in the UK and number 21 in the US in 1973. During the recording of the album, the rift between Stewart and the rest of the Faces grew further, as (according to Ian McLagan), Stewart did not participate until two weeks into the sessions, "and then complained that some songs were in the wrong key for him. So we recorded them again and waited a week for him to come back. We cut the track for 'Ooh La La' three times before he eventually passed on it, leaving it for Woody to sing. [...] The week the album came out he did all he could to scuttle it and told anyone who would listen how useless it was." The band toured Australasia, Japan, Europe and the UK in 1974 to support the album and the single "Pool Hall Richard".

In late 1974, Stewart released his Smiler album. In Britain, it reached number one, and the single "Farewell" number seven, but only number 13 on the Billboard pop album charts and the single "Mine for Me" only number 91 on the Billboard pop singles charts. It was his last original album for Mercury Records. After the release of the double album compilation The Best of Rod Stewart he switched to Warner Bros. Records and remained with them throughout the vast majority of his career (Faces were signed to Warner Bros., and Stewart's solo releases in the UK appeared on the Riva label until 1981). In 1975, Faces toured the US twice (with Ronnie Wood joining the Rolling Stones' US tour in between). With Ronnie Wood having released his second solo album in 1975 and also having joined the Rolling Stones (first as a temporary replacement for the departing Mick Taylor, and later as a permanent member), as well as Stewart's own burgeoning solo career, it became impossible to maintain the Faces as a viable band, so the Faces broke up at the end of the year.

=== 1975–1988: Height of fame and critical reaction ===
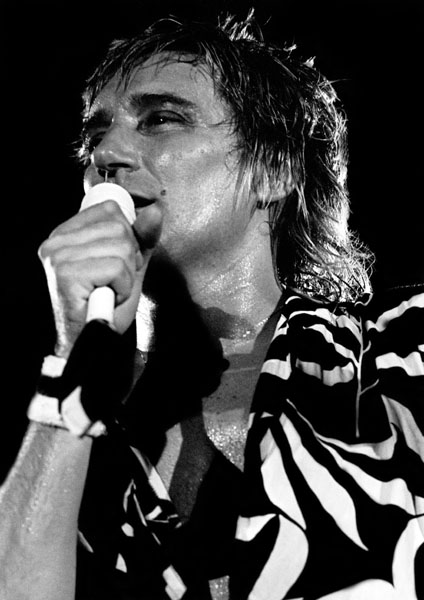
On stage in Dublin, 1981

In 1975, Stewart moved to Los Angeles; that year, he released the Atlantic Crossing album for his new record company, using producer Tom Dowd and a different sound based on the Muscle Shoals Rhythm Section. Atlantic Crossing marked both a return to form and a return to the Top 10 of the Billboard album charts. The first single, a cover of the Sutherland Brothers song "Sailing", was a number-one hit in the UK, charted high in other European countries and in Australia, but only reached the Top 60 of the US and Canadian charts. The single returned to the UK Top 10 a year later when used as the theme music for a BBC documentary series about HMS Ark Royal. Having been a hit twice over, "Sailing" became, and remains, Stewart's biggest-selling single in the UK. His Holland-Dozier-Holland cover "This Old Heart of Mine" was also a Top 100 hit in 1976. In 1976, Stewart covered the Beatles' song "Get Back" for the musical documentary All This and World War II.

Later in 1976, Stewart topped the US Billboard Hot 100 for eight weeks and the Australian ARIA chart with the ballad "Tonight's the Night", with an accompanying music video featuring actress Britt Ekland. It came from the A Night on the Town album, which went to number two on the Billboard album charts and was Stewart's first album to go platinum. By explicitly marking the album as having a "fast side" and a "slow side", Stewart continued the trend started by Atlantic Crossing. "The First Cut Is the Deepest", a cover of a Cat Stevens song, went number one in the UK in 1977, and top 30 in the US. "The Killing of Georgie (Part 1 and 2)", about the murder of a gay man, was also a Top 40 hit for Stewart during 1977.

Foot Loose & Fancy Free (1977) featured Stewart's own band, the original Rod Stewart Group that featured Carmine Appice, Phil Chen, Jim Cregan, Billy Peek, Gary Grainger and John Jarvis. It continued Stewart's run of chart success, reaching number two. "You're in My Heart" was the hit single, reaching number four in the US.

"Hot Legs" achieved a lot of radio airplay as did the confessional "I Was Only Joking". In appearance, Stewart's look had evolved to include a glam element, including make-up and spandex clothes. Stewart scored another UK number one and US number one single with "Da Ya Think I'm Sexy?", which was a crossover hit reaching number five on the Billboard black charts due to its disco sound. This was the lead single from 1978's Blondes Have More Fun, which went to number one on the Billboard album charts and sold three million albums.

A focal point of criticisms about this period was his biggest-selling 1978 disco hit "Da Ya Think I'm Sexy?", which was atypical of his earlier output, and disparaged by critics. In interviews, Stewart, while admitting his accompanying look had become "tarty", has defended the lyrics by pointing out that the song is a third-person narrative slice-of-life portrayal, not unlike those in his earlier work, and that it is not about him. The song's refrain was identical to Brazilian Jorge Ben Jor's earlier "Taj Mahal" and a lawsuit ensued. Stewart donated his royalties from "Da Ya Think I'm Sexy?" to UNICEF, and he performed it with his band at the Music for UNICEF Concert at the United Nations General Assembly in 1979.

Stewart moved to a more new wave direction in 1980 by releasing the album Foolish Behaviour. The album produced one hit single, "Passion", which reached No. 5 on the US Billboard Charts. In August 1981, MTV was launched in the US with several of Stewart's videos in heavy rotation. Later in 1981, Stewart added further elements of new wave and synthpop to his sound for the Tonight I'm Yours album. The title song reached No. 20 in the US, while "Young Turks" reached the Top 5 with the album going platinum. On 18 December 1981, Stewart played the Los Angeles Forum, along with Kim Carnes and Tina Turner, in a concert broadcast worldwide via satellite.

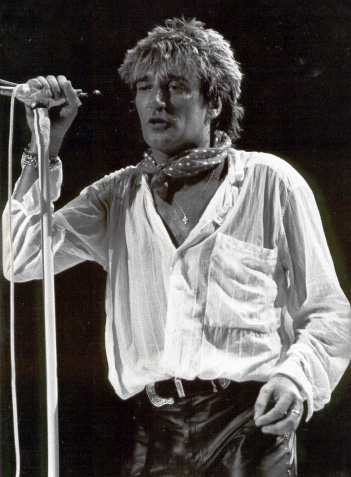
Stewart performing in Paris, 1986

Stewart was criticised by the anti-apartheid movement for breaking a widely observed cultural boycott of apartheid South Africa by performing at the Sun City resort complex in Bophuthatswana as part of his Body Wishes (1983) and Camouflage (1984) tours.

Stewart had four US Top 10 singles between 1982 and 1988; "Young Turks" (No. 5, carrying over from 1981 into 1982), "Some Guys Have All the Luck" (No. 10, 1984), "Infatuation" (No. 6, 1984) and "Love Touch" (No. 6, 1986, a Holly Knight/Mike Chapman collaboration). "Baby Jane" reached No. 14 in 1983, but went to No. 1 in the UK, his final chart-topping single there to date. The corresponding Camouflage album went gold in the UK, and the single "Infatuation" (which featured his old friend Jeff Beck on the guitar) received considerable play on MTV. The second single "Some Guys Have All The Luck" reached No. 15 in the UK and No. 10 in the US.

A reunion with Jeff Beck produced a successful take on Curtis Mayfield's "People Get Ready", but an attempt to tour together fell apart after a few dates. In the UK, "Every Beat of My Heart" reached number two in 1986. In January 1985, Stewart performed to a large audience at the Rock in Rio festival in Rio de Janeiro.

=== 1988–1994: Out of Order Tour, Vagabond Heart and Rock and Roll Hall of Fame ===
In 1988, Stewart returned with Out of Order, produced by Duran Duran's Andy Taylor and by Bernard Edwards of Chic. "Lost in You", "Forever Young", "Crazy About Her", and "My Heart Can't Tell You No" from that album were all top 15 hits on the Billboard Hot 100 and mainstream rock charts, with the latter even reaching the Top Five. "Forever Young" was an unconscious revision of Bob Dylan's song of the same name; the artists reached an agreement about sharing royalties. The song reached No. 12 in the US. In September 1988, Stewart performed "Forever Young" at the 1988 MTV Video Music Awards at the Universal Amphitheatre in Los Angeles, and in 1989 he received a Grammy Award nomination for Best Male Rock Vocal Performance for the song.

In January 1989, Stewart set out on the South American leg of the Out of Order Tour playing to sell-out audiences throughout Americas. There were 80,000 people at his show at Corregidora Stadium, Querétaro, México (9 April), and 50,000 at Jalisco Stadium, Guadalajara, Jalisco (12 April). In Buenos Aires, the audience at the River Plate Stadium, which seats 70,000+, was at over 90,000, with several thousand outside the stadium. Firehoses were sprayed on the crowd to avoid heat prostration.

Stewart's version of the Tom Waits song "Downtown Train" went to number three on the Billboard Hot 100 in 1990. This song was taken from a four-CD compilation set called Storyteller – The Complete Anthology: 1964–1990.

Released in 1991, the Vagabond Heart album continued Stewart's renewal and inspiration. The lead single, "It Takes Two", with Tina Turner, was released in 1990 in advance of the full album's release, and reached number five on the UK charts, but did not chart in the US. The follow-up songs from Vagabond Heart both reached the Billboard Hot 100 in 1991, with "Rhythm of My Heart" peaking at No. 5 and "The Motown Song" peaking at No. 10.

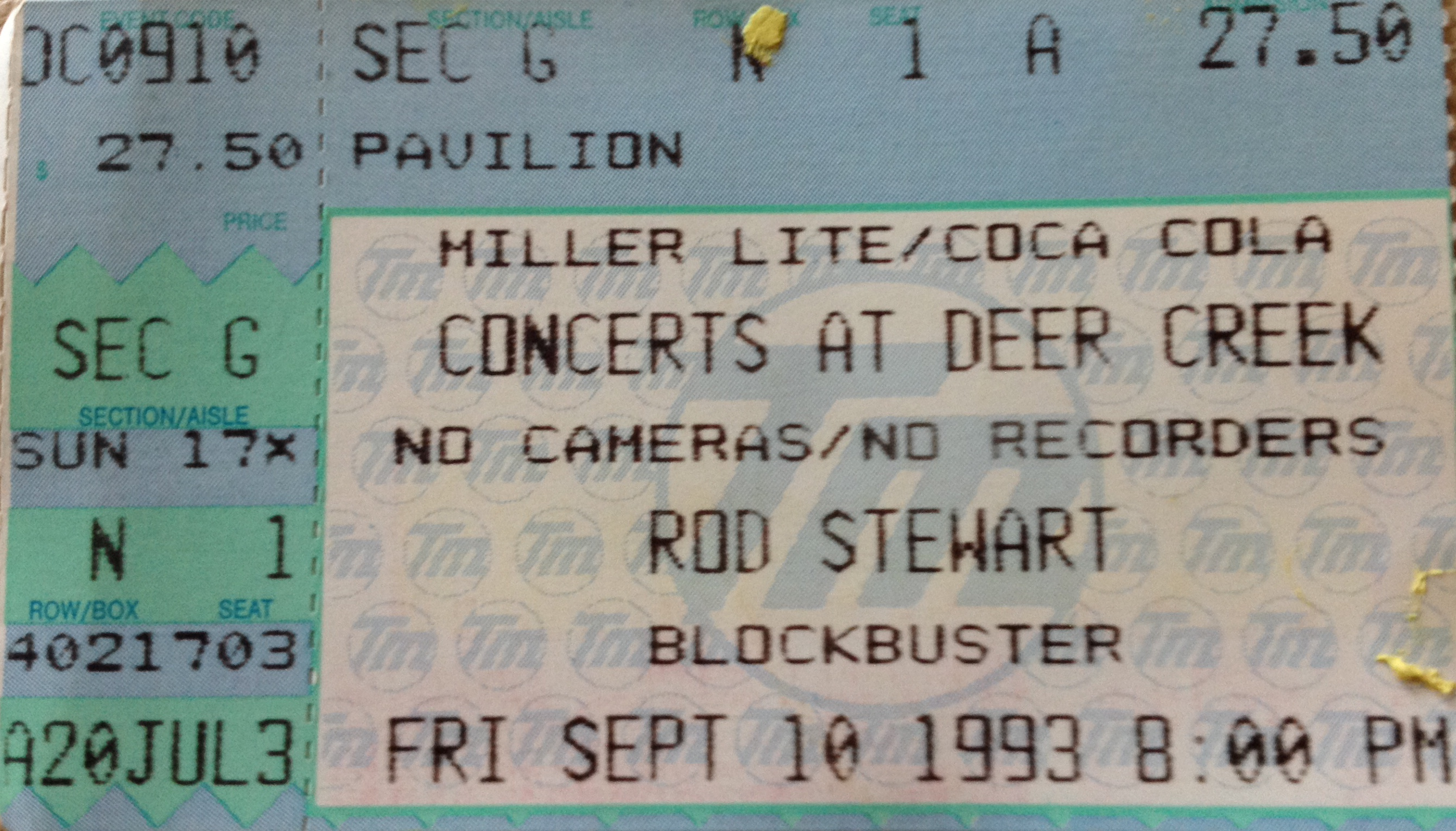
Concert ticket, 1993

At the 1993 Brit Awards in London, Stewart picked up the prize for Outstanding Contribution to Music. Stewart brought back the Faces on stage for an impromptu reunion. In 1993, Stewart recorded "All For Love" with Sting and Bryan Adams for the soundtrack to the movie The Three Musketeers; the single reached number one in the US and number two in the UK. Also in 1993, he reunited with Ronnie Wood to record an MTV Unplugged special that included "Handbags and Gladrags", "Cut Across Shorty", and four selections from Every Picture Tells a Story. The show featured an acoustic version of Van Morrison's "Have I Told You Lately", which topped the Billboard adult contemporary chart and No. 5 on the Billboard Hot 100. A rendition of "Reason to Believe" also garnered considerable airplay. The resulting Unplugged...and Seated album reached number two on the Billboard 200 album charts.

Stewart was inducted into the Rock and Roll Hall of Fame in 1994, presented by Jeff Beck. On 31 December 1994, Stewart played in front of 3.5 million people on Copacabana beach in Rio, and made it into the Guinness Book of World Records for staging the largest free rock concert attendance in history.

=== 1995–2001: New ventures and record labels ===
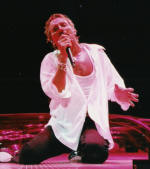
Stewart in Paris, 1995

By the early 1990s, Stewart had mostly abandoned creating his own material, saying that he was not a natural songwriter and that the tepid response to his recent efforts was not rewarding. In 1995, Stewart released A Spanner in the Works containing a single written by Tom Petty, "Leave Virginia Alone", which reached the Top 10 of the adult contemporary charts. The latter half of the 1990s was not as commercially successful though the 1996 album If We Fall in Love Tonight reached number 8 in the UK and went gold and hit No. 19 on the Billboard album chart. The title track, written and produced by Jimmy Jam and Terry Lewis, reached the Top 5 in the US and Canadian AC charts.

When We Were the New Boys, his final album on the Warner Bros. label released in 1998, contained versions of songs by Britpop acts such as Oasis and Primal Scream, and reached number two on the UK album charts. That same year, he recorded the song "Faith of the Heart", written by Diane Warren, for the film Patch Adams. In 2000, Stewart left Warner Bros. and moved to Atlantic Records, another division of Warner Music Group. In 2001, he released Human. The single "I Can't Deny It" went Top 40 in the UK and Top 20 in the adult contemporary. Stewart then signed to Clive Davis' new J Records label. The Story So Far: The Very Best of Rod Stewart, a greatest hits album compiled from his time at Warner Bros., is certified four times platinum in the UK with over 1.2 million copies sold and reached number one in 2001 in Belgium and France.

=== 2002–2010: The Great American Songbook series and Soulbook ===
In June 2002, Stewart performed "Handbags and Gladrags" at the Party at the Palace held at Buckingham Palace Garden, a concert which celebrated the Golden Jubilee of Elizabeth II and featured stars from five decades of music.

By 2002, Stewart had sold over 100 million records during his career. While growing up, he heard in his home classic songs written by songwriters such as Cole Porter, Gus Kahn and George and Ira Gershwin. Stewart joined others who had recorded the classic songs. He concentrated on singing 1930s and 1940s pop standards from the Great American Songbook with great popular success. These albums have been released on Clive Davis's J Records label and have seen Stewart enjoy album sales equal to the 1970s.

The first album from the songbook series, It Had to Be You: the Great American Songbook, reached number four on the US album chart, number eight in the UK and number ten in Canada when released in late 2002. The track "These Foolish Things" (which is actually a British, not American, song) reached number 13 on the Billboard adult contemporary chart, and "They Can't Take That Away From Me" went Top 20.

The second series album, As Time Goes By: the Great American Songbook 2, reached number two in the US, number four in the UK and number one in Canada. "Bewitched, Bothered and Bewildered", a duet with Cher, went Top 20 on the US adult contemporary charts. "Time After Time" was another Top 30 track on the US adult contemporary charts. A musical called Tonight's The Night, featuring many of Stewart's songs, opened 7 November 2003 at London's Victoria Palace Theatre. It is written and directed by Ben Elton, who previously created a similar production, We Will Rock You, with music by Queen. The musical tells about a "Faustian pact between Detroit gas station mechanic Stu Clutterbuck and Satan."

In 2004, Stewart reunited with Ronnie Wood for concerts of Faces material. A Rod Stewart and the Faces best of album, Changing Faces, reached the Top 20 of the UK album charts. Five Guys Walk into a Bar..., a Faces box set compilation, was released. In late 2004, Stardust: the Great American Songbook 3, the third album in Stewart's songbook series, was released. It was his first US number one album in 25 years, selling over 200,000 albums in its first week. It also debuted at number one in Canada, number three in the UK and Top 10 in Australia. His version of Louis Armstrong's "What a Wonderful World", featuring Stevie Wonder, made the Top 20 of the world adult charts. He also recorded a duet with Dolly Parton for the album – "Baby, It's Cold Outside". Stewart won his first ever Grammy Award for this album.

2005 saw the release of the fourth songbook album, Thanks for the Memory: The Great American Songbook 4; it included duets with Diana Ross and Elton John. Within weeks of its release, the CD made it to number two on the Top 200 list. In late 2006, Stewart made his return to rock music and his new approach to country music with the release of Still the Same... Great Rock Classics of Our Time, a new album featuring rock and southern rock milestones from the last four decades, including a cover of Creedence Clearwater Revival's "Have You Ever Seen the Rain?", which was released as the first single. The album debuted at number one on the Billboard charts with 184,000 copies in its first week. The number one debut was helped by a concert in New York City that was on MSN Music and an appearance on Dancing with the Stars. He performed tracks from his new album live from the Nokia Theater on 9 October. Control Room broadcast the event Live on MSN and in 117 cinemas across the country via National CineMedia. In November 2006, Stewart was inducted into the UK Music Hall of Fame.

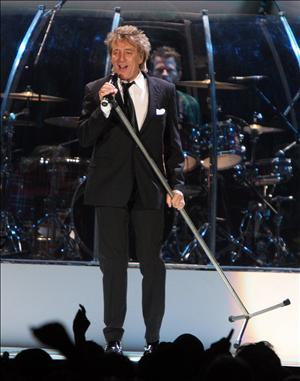
Performing in Zaragoza, Spain, November 2006

On 1 July 2007, Stewart performed at the Concert for Diana held at Wembley Stadium, London, an event which celebrated the life of Princess Diana almost 10 years after her death. He performed "Sailing", "Baby Jane" and "Maggie May". On 12 December, he performed for the first time at the Royal Variety Performance at the London Coliseum in front of HRH Prince of Wales and The Duchess of Cornwall, singing another Cat Stevens number, "Father and Son", and Bonnie Tyler's song "It's a Heartache". On 22 December 2006, Stewart hosted the 8th Annual A Home for the Holidays special on CBS at 8:00 pm (PST).

On 20 May 2009, Stewart performed "Maggie May" on the grand finale of American Idol season 8. On 2, July 2009 Stewart performed his only UK date that year at Home Park, Plymouth. On 29 September 2009 a 4-CD, 65-track compilation entitled Rod Stewart Sessions 1971–1998 was released; it is composed of previously unreleased tracks and outtakes from the bulk of his career. Stewart has also mentioned plans for a compilation of covers of soul classics, the possible release of another edition of the Great American Songbook album and a country covers album.

On 17 October 2009, Stewart released the studio album Soulbook which was composed of covers of soul and Motown songs. On 14 November 2009, Stewart recorded a TV program in the UK for ITV that was screened on 5 December 2009. The music in the programme featured tracks from his new album and some old favourites. On 14 January 2010, Rhino records released Stewart's Once in a Blue Moon, a "lost album" originally recorded in 1992, featuring ten cover songs including the Rolling Stones' "Ruby Tuesday", Bob Dylan's "The Groom's Still Waiting at the Altar" and Stevie Nicks' "Stand Back", as well as Tom Waits' "Tom Traubert's Blues". On 19 October 2010, Stewart released another edition of his Great American Songbook series titled Fly Me to the Moon...The Great American Songbook Volume V on J Records.

=== 2011–2012: Christmas album and autobiography ===
In 2011, Stewart performed with Stevie Nicks on their Heart & Soul Tour. Starting on 20 March in Fort Lauderdale, Florida, the tour visited arena concerts in North America – with performances in New York, Toronto, Los Angeles, Philadelphia, Chicago, Detroit, Tampa and Montreal, among others.

Stewart headlined the Sunday show at the 2011 Hard Rock Calling Festival on 26 June in London's Hyde Park. Stewart signed on to a two-year residency at the Colosseum at Caesars Palace, Las Vegas, commencing on 24 August. Performing his greatest hits, the residency also saw him perform selected tracks from his upcoming, untitled blues album.

On 7 June 2012, Stewart signed a recording agreement with Universal Music Group. Stewart released his first Christmas album, titled Merry Christmas, Baby, on the Verve Music Group label (a division of Universal Music Group) on 30 October 2012. The album was produced by David Foster and contained several duets, as well as an original song written by Stewart, Foster and Amy Foster called "Red-Suited Super Man". According to IFPI, Merry Christmas, Baby was the seventh best-selling album worldwide in 2012. In October 2012, Stewart's autobiography titled Rod: The Autobiography was released (exact dates vary worldwide).

In November 2012, Stewart performed "Auld Lang Syne" from his Christmas album and his hit "Sailing" at the Royal Albert Hall for the Royal British Legion Festival of Remembrance, which was attended by Queen Elizabeth II. Later that month, Stewart again performed at the Royal Albert Hall in front of the Queen during the 100th Royal Variety Performance, singing "When You Wish upon a Star". On 26 November, Stewart's recording of "Let It Snow! Let It Snow! Let It Snow!" reached the top of the Billboard Adult Contemporary Chart. Stewart had the number one song on this chart three times previously, the last being in 1993 with "Have I Told You Lately", giving him the second-largest hiatus between number ones in the history of the chart. The song remained in the No. 1 spot for five weeks, tying it for the longest-leading holiday title in the chart's 51-year history. On 10 December 2012, Stewart was a guest singer on Michael Bublé's television Home for the Holidays Christmas special. Stewart was the tenth best-selling artist in Canada in the year 2012, according to year-end sales data from Nielsen Soundscan Canada. In February 2013, Stewart was nominated for a Canadian Juno Award in the International Album of the Year category for his album Merry Christmas, Baby.

=== 2013–2015: Return to songwriting – Time and Another Country ===
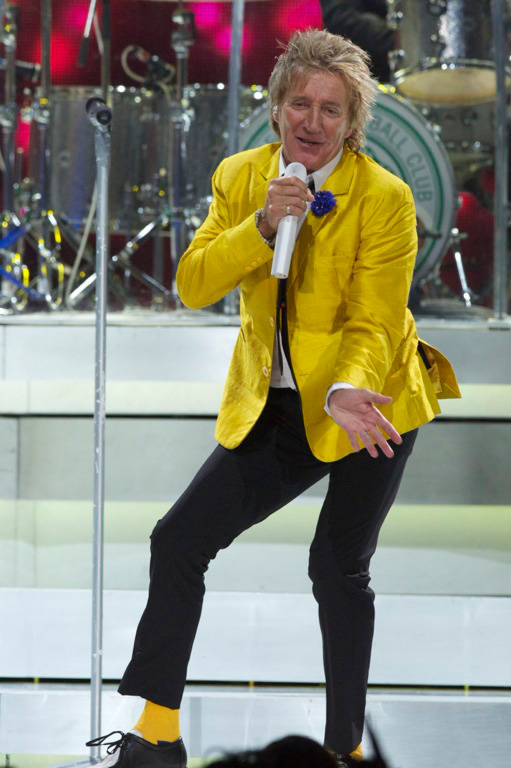
Performing in Hamburg in September 2013

In May 2013, Stewart released Time, a rock album of his own original material. It marked a return to songwriting after what Stewart termed "a dark period of twenty years"; he said that writing his autobiography gave him the impetus to write music again. The album entered the UK Albums Chart at number 1, setting a new British record for the longest gap between chart-topping albums by an artist. Stewart's last No. 1 on the chart had been Greatest Hits Volume 1 in 1979 and his last studio album to top the chart was 1976's A Night on the Town.

In September 2013, Stewart presented his friend Elton John with the first Brits Icon award in a special show at the London Palladium, recognising John's "lasting impact" on UK culture. Stewart quipped that John was "the second-best rock singer ever", before the two performed a duet on stage.

A new studio album, Another Country, was released on 23 October 2015. The video for the first single "Love Is" is available on his Vevo account.

=== 2016–present: Continuing to record – Blood Red Roses and The Tears of Hercules ===
Stewart recorded vocals with Joe Walsh on the Frankie Miller album Frankie Miller's Double Take, which was released on 30 September 2016. He sang his cover of the Beatles' "Sgt. Pepper's Lonely Hearts Club Band" as Sgt. Pepper for Beat Bugs episode 17b, which debuted 18 November 2016 on Netflix. At the same, Stewart was quoted responding to John Lennon's 1980 assertion that Stewart's hit "The Killing of Georgie (Part 1 and 2)" plagiarised his song "Don't Let Me Down", declaring to The Guardian: "It does sound like it, [...] Nothing wrong with a good steal!".

On 28 September 2018, Stewart released his 30th studio album, Blood Red Roses, on Republic Records. He duets with Welsh singer Bonnie Tyler on the track "Battle of the Sexes" from her 2019 studio album, Between the Earth and the Stars. Stewart collaborated with the Royal Philharmonic Orchestra for the release of You're in My Heart in November 2019. The album contains new versions of the hit songs "Maggie May", and "It Takes Two" with Robbie Williams.

On 22 November 2019, Stewart released You're in My Heart: Rod Stewart with the Royal Philharmonic Orchestra, produced by Trevor Horn. The album contains vocal tracks from UK number one hits "Sailing", "I Don't Want To Talk About It" and "The First Cut is the Deepest" with new arrangements performed by the Royal Philharmonic Orchestra, as well as 1971 chart toppers in both the UK and US "Maggie May" and "Reasons to Believe". The release of You're In My Heart coincided with Stewart's biggest-ever UK stadium tour throughout November and December 2019, a continuation of his successful summer stadium tour. You're In My Heart also included "Stop Loving Her Today", a new song, as well as a new recording of "It Takes Two" featuring Robbie Williams. You're in My Heart topped the UK Albums Chart, staying in the number one position for three weeks and making it his tenth UK chart-topping album. Stewart released his 31st studio album The Tears of Hercules in November 2021. Stewart is only the fifth British act in UK chart history with 10 or more number-one albums, and BPI Certified – Gold.

In June 2022, Stewart performed at the Platinum Party at the Palace. In November 2022, he said that he had refused to perform in Qatar the year before, despite an offer of "over $1m", citing the country's human rights record. In 2023, Rolling Stone ranked Stewart at No. 49 on their list of the 200 Greatest Singers of All Time. In May 2023, Stewart performed at the Jeff Beck tribute concerts held at the Royal Albert Hall, sharing the stage with Ronnie Wood, Eric Clapton, Kirk Hammett and Johnny Depp among others.

In late 2023, Warner Music announced a new album, Swing Fever, recorded with Jools Holland's Rhythm And Blues Orchestra, for 23 February 2024 release. A single from the album, "Almost Like Being in Love", was released on 5 December.

In February 2024 Irving Azoff's Iconic Artists Group acquired Stewart's catalogue for close to $100M.

In November 2024 Stewart was confirmed to play the Glastonbury Legends slot in 2025, 23 years after his last appearance at the festival. In June 2025 he cancelled a string of US concerts as he recovered from flu.

== Personal life ==
In May 2000, Stewart was diagnosed with thyroid cancer, for which he underwent surgery the same month. It had been previously reported he suffered from a benign vocal cord nodule. Besides being a major health scare, the resulting surgery also threatened his voice, and he had to re-learn how to sing. Since then he has been active in raising funds for The City of Hope Foundation charity to find cures for all forms of cancer, especially those affecting children. In September 2019, Stewart revealed that he had been diagnosed with prostate cancer in 2017, and had been given the all-clear after treatment.

Before returning to the UK, Stewart played for his LA Exiles team, made up of mostly English expatriates, plus a few celebrities, including Billy Duffy of the Cult, in a senior soccer league in Palos Verdes, California.

Despite his father having been a supporter of Hibernian, Stewart is a supporter of Celtic, which he mentions in "You're in My Heart". He supports the Scotland national football team and follows Manchester United as his English side, and he explains his love affair with both Celtic and Manchester United in Frank Worrall's book, Celtic United. Stewart clarifies this more in his 2012 book (pp. 163–64), Rod: The Autobiography, mentioning he "only had an attachment to Manchester United in the 1970s, but that was because they had so many great Scottish players in the 1970s, including Denis Law ... When I did eventually click with a team, it was Celtic". He presented Celtic with the trophy after they won the 2015 Scottish League Cup Final.

Stewart is a model railway enthusiast. His 23 ft × 124 ft (7.0 m × 37.8 m) HO scale layout in his Los Angeles home is modelled after the New York Central and the Pennsylvania Railroads during the 1940s. Called the Three Rivers City, the layout was featured in the cover story of the December 2007, December 2010, February 2014, June 2017, December 2024 and January 2025 issues of Model Railroader magazine. In the 2007 article, Stewart said that it meant more to him to be in a model railroad magazine than a music magazine. The layout, which has a mainline run of 900 ft (270 m), uses code 70 flextrack and a Digital Command Control (DCC) system made by Digitrax. Stewart has a second, smaller layout at his UK home, based on Britain's East Coast Main Line. In a sidebar to the 2014 Model Railroader article, Stewart confirmed (in an anecdote about having unwittingly mixed red scenery texturing material into a "turf" mix he used around the bases of buildings) that he is colour-blind. In a 2019 interview with Railway Modeller magazine, he said that the hobby is "addictive" for him.

Stewart has admitted to taking cocaine in the past.

A car collector, Stewart owns one of the 400 Ferrari Enzos. In 1982, Stewart was car-jacked on Los Angeles' Sunset Boulevard while he was parking his $50,000 Porsche. The car was subsequently recovered. In March 2022, Stewart and others personally filled in some potholes on the country lane near his Essex residence, claiming that an ambulance had burst a tyre and his Ferrari could not get through. Dominic Zaria, one of Stewart's neighbours, praised the singer's action and said the lane had "a massive crack" and could be dangerous when it was dark and wet. In response, the county council cautioned that potholes should be reported and repaired by professionals, adding residents making their own repairs "could become liable for any problems or accidents".

In September 2002, Stewart's son Sean was sentenced to three months in jail and required to pay compensation and attend anger management, drug and alcohol treatment courses for attacking a man outside a restaurant in Los Angeles.

Stewart was appointed Commander of the Order of the British Empire (CBE) in the 2007 New Year Honours for services to music. At his investiture in July 2007, at Buckingham Palace, Stewart commented: "It's a marvellous occasion. We're the only country in the world to honour the common man." He was knighted in the 2016 Birthday Honours for "services to music and charity".

Stewart was estimated to have a fortune of £215 million in the Sunday Times Rich List of 2021, making him the 12th wealthiest person in the British music industry. He lives with his wife in the Grade II listed Durrington House, a £4.65 million property in Essex. During his time in California, he was previously the owner of the modernist Wave House, said to have inspired Sydney Opera House.

In February 2023, it was announced that Stewart had paid for a day's worth of MRI scans for patients at Princess Alexandra Hospital in Harlow in order to aid in reducing waiting lists.

=== Political views ===
In 1970, Stewart expressed support for the anti-immigration Conservative Party politician Enoch Powell, saying that the United Kingdom was "overcrowded". In 1974, he told Melody Maker that he would leave the UK over its tax rates: "The Government thinks it'll tax us bastards right up to the hilt because we won't leave, but that's wrong because I will if I want to... with a 90 percent tax ceiling, it's just not worth living in England anymore." He moved to Los Angeles the following year, but recalled in his autobiography that this led to criticism from the British press and from his friend Elton John.

In January 2023, Stewart described himself as having been "a Tory for a long time" but called on Rishi Sunak's Conservative government to stand down and give the Labour Party "a go" at governing. He called Brexit "an enormous mistake and we're realising it too late", and said Scottish independence would be "a shame". In June 2025, he expressed support for Reform UK and its leader, Nigel Farage, having previously criticised Farage for suggesting that the West had provoked the 2022 Russian invasion of Ukraine.

=== Relationships and family ===
Stewart has eight children, by five mothers:

Duration	Partner	Child(ren)	Note
1963–1964	Susannah Boffey	Sarah Streeter (born 1964) London	Daughter Sarah was raised by her adoptive parents, Gerald and Evelyn Thubron.
1965–1967	Jennie Rylance		
1971–1975	Dee Harrington		
1975–1977	Britt Ekland		Ekland stated in 1981 that she ended her relationship with Stewart because he was unfaithful.
First marriage 1979–1984	Alana Stewart	Kimberly Alana Stewart (born 1979)	On 21 August 2011, daughter Kimberly gave birth to her first child, a daughter, with actor Benicio Del Toro.
First marriage 1979–1984	Alana Stewart	Sean Roderick Stewart (born 1980)	On 21 August 2011, daughter Kimberly gave birth to her first child, a daughter, with actor Benicio Del Toro.
1983–1990	Kelly Emberg	Ruby Stewart (born 1987)	
Second marriage 1990–2006	Rachel Hunter	Renee Cecili Stewart (born 1992)	Stewart and Hunter separated in 1999 and divorced in 2006. Son Liam played major junior ice hockey with the Spokane Chiefs of the Western Hockey League, has played in the Elite Ice Hockey League with the Coventry Blaze and Guildford Flames, and plays professional hockey with the Milton Keynes Lightning of the United Kingdom's National League.
Second marriage 1990–2006	Rachel Hunter	Liam McAlister Stewart (born 1994)	Stewart and Hunter separated in 1999 and divorced in 2006. Son Liam played major junior ice hockey with the Spokane Chiefs of the Western Hockey League, has played in the Elite Ice Hockey League with the Coventry Blaze and Guildford Flames, and plays professional hockey with the Milton Keynes Lightning of the United Kingdom's National League.
Third marriage Since 2007	Penny Lancaster-Stewart	Alastair Wallace Stewart (born 2005 in London)	The couple began dating in 1999 and married in the cloistered medieval monastery La Cervara in Portofino on 16 June 2007 and honeymooned on board the yacht Lady Ann Magee moored in the Italian port of Portofino.
Third marriage Since 2007	Penny Lancaster-Stewart	Aiden Patrick Stewart (born 2011)	The couple began dating in 1999 and married in the cloistered medieval monastery La Cervara in Portofino on 16 June 2007 and honeymooned on board the yacht Lady Ann Magee moored in the Italian port of Portofino.

In reference to his divorces, Stewart was once quoted as saying, "Instead of getting married again, I'm going to find a woman I don't like and just give her a house."

In January 2020, Stewart and his 39-year-old son Sean were arrested, and both were charged with battery following an incident at a Florida hotel. The case was resolved in 2021, with both Stewarts pleading guilty to simple battery in a plea agreement that included no jail time, no probation, and no fine.

== Awards and recognition ==
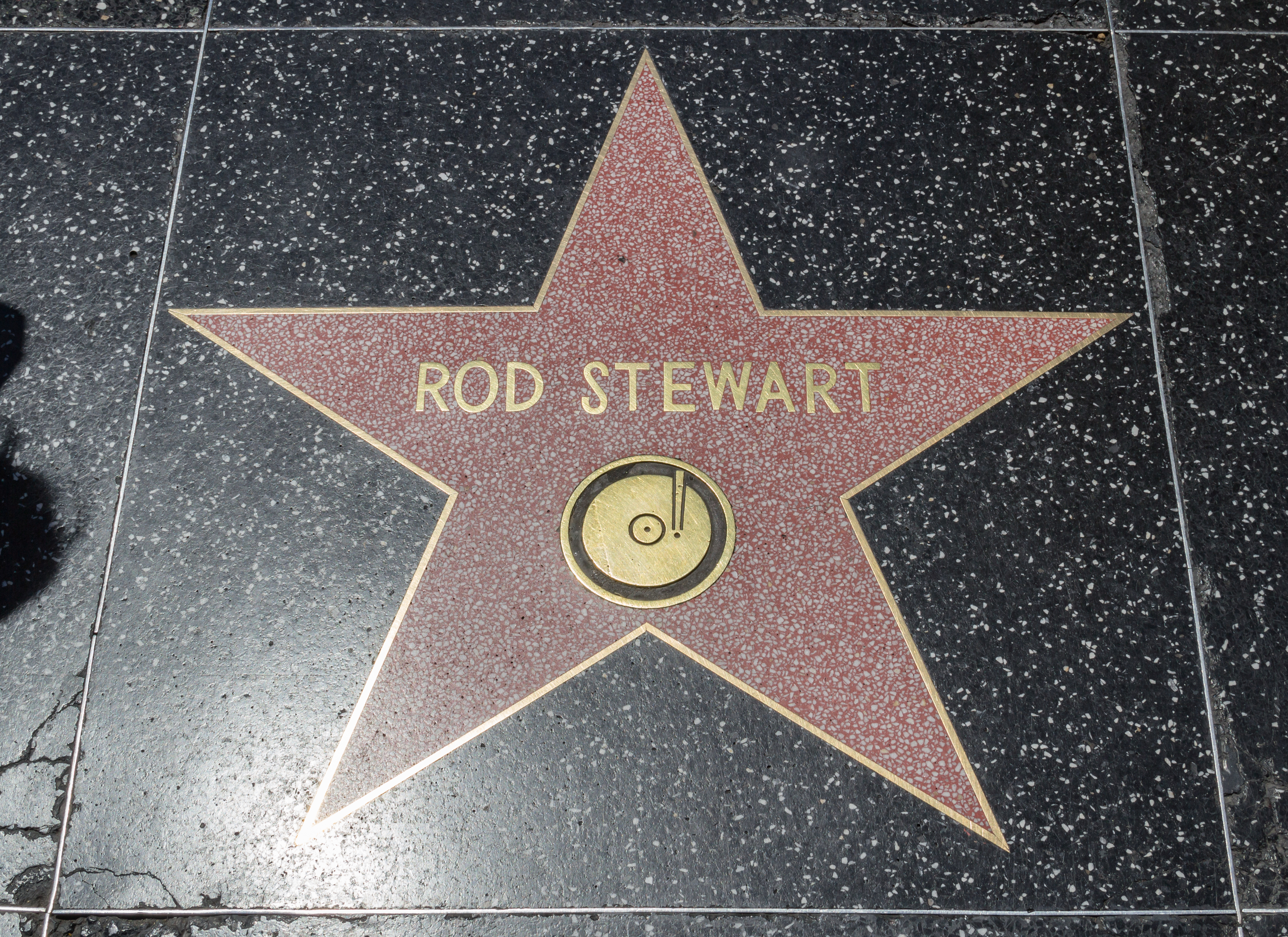
Stewart's star on the Hollywood Walk of Fame

- Silver Clef at 1991 Silver Clef Award
- Brit Award for Outstanding Contribution to Music, 1993.
- Received a Legend Award from the World Music Awards, 1993.
- Inducted into the Rock and Roll Hall of Fame, 1994 (as a solo artist).
- Received the first ever Chopard Diamond Award from the World Music Awards for over 100 million records sold worldwide, 2001.
- Grammy Award for Best Traditional Pop Vocal Album, 2005, Stardust ... The Great American Songbook Volume III.
- On 11 October 2005, Stewart received a star on the Hollywood Walk of Fame for his contributions to the music industry, located at 6801 Hollywood Boulevard.
- Inducted into the UK Music Hall of Fame, 2006.
- According to Stewart, soul singer James Brown called him music's "best white soul singer" in September 2006.
- Awarded CBE in the 2007 New Year Honours.
- Appointed Knight Bachelor in the 2016 Birthday Honours.
- Icon Award at the 2007 Silver Clef Awards.
- Received the ASCAP Founders Award in 2011.
- Inducted into the Rock and Roll Hall of Fame, 2012 (as a member of Faces).
- Inducted into the Ultimate Classic Rock Hall of Fame, 2013.
- To date, Stewart has received seven various Canadian Juno Award nominations.
- Goldene Europa 1991 Best International Singer
- American Music Awards 1994 International Artist Award
- Ivor Novello Awards 1999 Lifetime Achievement Award
- American Music Awards 2025 Lifetime Achievement Award
- Outstanding Achievement in Music award at 2022 Scottish Music Awards.

== List of bands ==
During his career, Rod Stewart has been a member of a number of groups including:

- Jimmy Powell and the Five Dimensions (1963)
- The Hoochie Coochie Men (1964–1965)
- Steampacket (1965–1966)
- Soul Agents (1965–1966)
- Shotgun Express (1966–1967)
- The Jeff Beck Group (1967–1969)
- Faces (1969–1975, 1986, 1993, 2015, 2019, 2020, 2021–present)

== Discography ==
=== Studio albums ===
- An Old Raincoat Won't Ever Let You Down (1969)
- Gasoline Alley (1970)
- Every Picture Tells a Story (1971)
- Never a Dull Moment (1972)
- Smiler (1974)
- Atlantic Crossing (1975)
- A Night on the Town (1976)
- Foot Loose & Fancy Free (1977)
- Blondes Have More Fun (1978)
- Foolish Behaviour (1980)
- Tonight I'm Yours (1981)
- Body Wishes (1983)
- Camouflage (1984)
- Every Beat of My Heart (1986)
- Out of Order (1988)
- Vagabond Heart (1991)
- A Spanner in the Works (1995)
- When We Were the New Boys (1998)
- Human (2001)
- It Had to Be You: The Great American Songbook (2002)
- As Time Goes By: The Great American Songbook, Volume II (2003)
- Stardust: The Great American Songbook, Volume III (2004)
- Thanks for the Memory: The Great American Songbook, Volume IV (2005)
- Still the Same... Great Rock Classics of Our Time (2006)
- Soulbook (2009)
- Once in a Blue Moon: The Lost Album (2010)
- Fly Me to the Moon... The Great American Songbook Volume V (2010)
- Merry Christmas, Baby (2012)
- Time (2013)
- Another Country (2015)
- Blood Red Roses (2018)
- The Tears of Hercules (2021)
- Swing Fever (with Jools Holland) (2024)

== Tours ==
- Foot Loose & Fancy Free Tour (1977)
- Blondes 'Ave More Fun Tour (1978–1979)
- Foolish Behaviour Tour (1980–1981)
- Worth Leavin' Home For Tour (1981–1982)
- Body Wishes Tour (1983)
- Camouflage Tour (1984–1985)
- Every Beat of My Heart Tour (1986)
- Out of Order Tour (1988–1989)
- Vagabond Heart Tour (1991–1992)
- A Night to Remember Tour (1993–1994)
- A Spanner in the Works Tour (1995–1996)
- All Rod, All Night, All the Hits Tour (1998–1999)
- Human Tour (2001)
- Live in Concert Tour (2002)
- From Maggie May to the Great American Songbook Tour (2004)
- Tour (2005)
- Rockin' in the Round Tour (2007)
- Rocks His Greatest Hits Tour (2008–2009)
- One Rockin' Night Tour (2009)
- Soulbook Tour (2010)
- Heart & Soul Tour (2011–2012) with Stevie Nicks
- Live the Life Tour (2013)
- The Voice, The Guitar, The Songs Tour (2014) with Santana
- The Hits Tour (2014–2015)
- Hits 2015
- Hits 2016
- From Gasoline Alley to Another Country: Hits 2016 (2016–2017)
- Summer Tour 2017 (with Cyndi Lauper)
- Summer Tour 2018 (with Cyndi Lauper)
- Blood Red Roses Tour (2019)
- Rod Stewart The Hits 2020
- Rod Stewart The Hits (2021–)
- One Last Time Tour (2025)

=== Residency show ===
- Rod Stewart: The Hits (2011–2024)

== See also ==
- Coronet Apartments
- Crooner
- List of artists who reached number one in the United States
- List of artists who reached number one on the US Dance Club Songs chart
- List of Billboard number-one dance club songs
- Lists of Billboard number-one singles

== Bibliography ==
- Bradley, Lloyd (1999). Rod Stewart: Every Picture Tells a Story: The Illustrated Biography. London: Aurum Press. ISBN 1-85410-657-0.
- Burton, Peter (1977). Rod Stewart: A Life on the Town. New English Library. ISBN 0-450-03429-1.
- Carson, Annette (2001). Jeff Beck: Crazy Fingers. Hal Leonard Corporation. ISBN 0-87930-632-7.
- Coleman, Ray (1994). Rod Stewart – The Biography. Pavilion Books. ISBN 1-85793-586-1.
- Cromelin, Richard (1976). Rod Stewart: A Biography in Words & Pictures. Sire Books.
- Ewbank, Tim; Hildred, Stafford (2005). Rod Stewart: The New Biography. Citadel Press. ISBN 0-8065-2644-0.
- Giuliano, Geoffrey (1993). Rod Stewart: Vagabond Heart. Carroll & Graf Publishers.
- Gray, John (1992). Rod Stewart: The Visual Documentary. London: Omnibus Press. ISBN 0-7119-2906-8.
- Heilemann, Wolfgang; Thomas, Sabine (2005). Rod Stewart: Live, Private, Backstage: Photos 1970–1980. Schwarzkopf & Schwarzkopf. ISBN 3-89602-647-X.
- Hinman, Doug (2004). The Kinks – All Day and All of the Night: Day-By-Day Concerts, Recordings and Broadcasts, 1961–1996. Hal Leonard Corporation. ISBN 0-87930-765-X.
- Jasper, Tony (1977). Rod Stewart. Octopus Books. ISBN 0-7064-0666-4.
- Kitts, Thomas M. (2008). Ray Davies: Not Like Everybody Else. New York: Routledge. ISBN 978-0-415-97768-5.
- Marcus, Greil (1980). "Rod Stewart". In Miller, Jim (ed.). The Rolling Stone Illustrated History of Rock & Roll (paperback) (Revised and Updated ed.). Random House/Rolling Stone Press. pp. 377–380. ISBN 0-394-73938-8.
- Marsh, Dave; Swenson, John, eds. (1983). The New Rolling Stone Record Guide. Random House/Rolling Stone Press. ISBN 0-394-72107-1.
- Melly, Jim (2003). 'Last orders, please': Rod Stewart, the Faces and the Britain we forgot. Ebury Press. ISBN 0-09-188618-X.
- Moritz, Charles, ed. (1980). Current Biography Yearbook 1979. New York: H. W. Wilson Company.
- Nelson, Paul; Bangs, Lester (1981). Rod Stewart. New York: Delilah Books. ISBN 0-933328-08-7.
- Pidgeon, John (1976). Rod Stewart and the Changing Faces. Panther Books. ISBN 0-586-04650-X.
- Stewart, Rod (2012). Rod: The Autobiography. London: Century. ISBN 978-1-78089-052-4.
- Tremlett, George (1976). The Rod Stewart Story. Futura Publications. ISBN 0-86007-351-3.
- Wooldridge, Max (2002). Rock 'n' Roll London. Macmillan Publishers. ISBN 0-312-30442-0.
