= The She Trinity =

Canadian and British pop group

The She Trinity was a Canadian and British pop group of the 1960s. The band was assembled as an all-female group who played their own instruments, a rarity in the period. The original members, Robyn Yorke, Shelley Gillespie and Sue Kirby, were Canadians who came to England around 1965. They were joined by Pauline Moran on bass and Marion "Rusty" Hill on keyboards. Eileen Woodman joined in 1967 when Rusty left, by which time Shelley and Sue had already left. The final 1967 line-up consisted of Robyn Yorke and Janet Baily on drums, Pauline Moran on bass guitar, Eileen Woodman on keyboards, Barbara Thompson on saxophone and Beryl Marsden on vocals. The final line-up was Eileen, Robyn, Pauline and a Swedish guitarist named Inger Jonnsson. The band dissolved in 1970–71.

Eileen Woodman went on to play keyboards with Billy Connolly and Gerry Rafferty in the Humblebums, Pete Brown's Flying Tigers (previously The Battered Ornaments) and also did a stint as keyboard player/vocalist with Tinkerbells Fairydust (at that time known as The Rush). Pauline Moran went on to be an actress on stage and in film and television, including playing the part of Miss Lemon in Agatha Christie's Poirot with David Suchet from 1989 to 2002, and again in 2013. Barbara Thompson, who married Jon Hiseman, became a notable jazz-rock player. Beryl Marsden still plays and has appeared in the Beatles Festival in Liverpool.

Their third release for Columbia Records bore the notable title "The Man Who Took The Valise Off The Floor Of Grand Central Station At Noon". The She Trinity would also sometimes play under the name of "British Maid" around this time, but they only ever used this name in France. In 1970 The She Trinity released the single "Hair". The B side of this, "Climb That Tree", was credited to the members of the Cornish band The Onyx who had recorded the music in 1967 as a demo.

== Discography ==
- "He Fought The Law" / "The Union Station Blues" (1966, Columbia DB7874)
- "Have I Sinned" / "Wild Flower" (1966, Columbia DB7943)
- "Wild Flower" / "The Man Who Took The Valise Off The Floor Of Grand Central Station At Noon" (1966, Columbia DB7959)
- "Yellow Submarine" / "Promise Me You'll Cry" (1966, Columbia DB7992)
- "Across The Street" / "Over And Over Again" (1967, CBS 2819)
- "Hair" / "Climb That Tree" (1969, President PT283)
