= Live the Life Tour =

2013 concert tour by Rod Stewart

- World tour by Rod Stewart
- Promotional poster for the tour
- Location: North America; Europe
- Associated album: Time
- Start date: 1 June 2013
- End date: 15 December 2013
- Legs: 2
- No. of shows: 24 in Europe; 11 in North America; 35 in total

Rod Stewart concert chronology
- Rod Stewart: The Hits (2011–2018); Live the Life Tour (2013); The Voice, The Guitar, The Songs Tour (2014)

The Live the Life Tour is a concert tour by singer Rod Stewart to promote his 2013 album, Time.

== Background ==
The Live the Life Tour was officially announced on 4 December 2012 at Stewart's official website. Seven shows were announced for the United States as well as two Canadian concerts. Shows in New York City, Newark and Greensboro were announced later. By 26 December 2012, the schedule also includes shows in England, Northern Ireland, Ireland, Sweden, Norway, the Netherlands and Germany.

Steve Winwood has been announced to be joining the tour in North America.

In Europe, Moya will be the opening act at fourteen of the fifteen shows (the exception being Oslo).

== Tour dates ==
| Date | City | Country | Venue | Tickets sold / available | Gross revenue |
|---|---|---|---|---|---|
Europe
| 1 June 2013 | Nottingham | England | Capital FM Arena | 6,562 / 6,562 | $704,373 |
| 4 June 2013 | London | England | The O_{2} Arena | 13,652 / 15,616 | $1,389,170 |
| 8 June 2013 | Manchester | England | Manchester Arena | 25,909 / 25,909 | $2,428,447 |
| 9 June 2013 | Manchester | England | Manchester Arena | 25,909 / 25,909 | $2,428,447 |
| 12 June 2013 | Amsterdam | Netherlands | Ziggo Dome | 12,099 / 12,099 | $833,468 |
| 15 June 2013 | Stockholm | Sweden | Ericsson Globe | 8,893 / 8,893 | $1,009,431 |
| 16 June 2013^{[A]} | Oslo | Norway | Frognerbadet | | |
| 19 June 2013 | Birmingham | England | LG Arena | 22,338 / 22,338 | $1,963,150 |
| 20 June 2013 | Birmingham | England | LG Arena | 22,338 / 22,338 | $1,963,150 |
| 23 June 2013 | Sheffield | England | Motorpoint Arena Sheffield | 11,494 / 11,494 | $1,174,214 |
| 26 June 2013 | Belfast | Northern Ireland | Odyssey Arena | 16,006 / 16,006 | $1,573,200 |
| 27 June 2013 | Belfast | Northern Ireland | Odyssey Arena | 16,006 / 16,006 | $1,573,200 |
| 29 June 2013 | Dublin | Ireland | RDS Arena | 25,653 / 25,653 | $2,765,196 |
| 3 July 2013 | Dortmund | Germany | Westfalenhallen | | |
| 11 July 2013 | London | England | The O_{2} Arena | 14,443 / 14,443 | $1,264,155 |
| 12 September 2013 | Hamburg | Germany | O_{2} World Hamburg | 5,703 / 6,955 | $692,068 |
| 14 September 2013 | Rybnik | Poland | Stadion Miejski Rybniku | | |
| 17 September 2013 | Liverpool | England | Echo Arena Liverpool | 9,734 / 9,734 | $985,306 |
| 20 September 2013 | London | England | The O_{2} Arena | 28,261 / 28,261 | $2,606,105 |
| 21 September 2013 | London | England | The O_{2} Arena | 28,261 / 28,261 | $2,606,105 |
| 24 September 2013 | Leeds | England | First Direct Arena | 11,050 / 11,050 | $1,032,578 |
| 27 September 2013 | Newcastle | England | Metro Radio Arena | 8,856 / 8,856 | $920,440 |
| 30 September 2013 | Glasgow | Scotland | The Hydro | 46,080 / 46,080 | $4,850,478 |
| 2 October 2013 | Glasgow | Scotland | The Hydro | 46,080 / 46,080 | $4,850,478 |
| 4 October 2013 | Glasgow | Scotland | The Hydro | 46,080 / 46,080 | $4,850,478 |
| 5 October 2013 | Glasgow | Scotland | The Hydro | 46,080 / 46,080 | $4,850,478 |
North America
| 14 October 2013 | University Park | United States | Bryce Jordan Center | | |
| 17 October 2013 | Greensboro | United States | Greensboro Coliseum | | |
| 19 October 2013 | Atlanta | United States | Philips Arena | 7,596 / 9,518 | $626,539 |
| 24 October 2013 | Chicago | United States | United Center | | |
| 26 October 2013 | Auburn Hills | United States | The Palace of Auburn Hills | | |
| 4 December 2013 | Boston | United States | TD Garden | | |
| 7 December 2013 | Newark | United States | Prudential Center | | |
| 9 December 2013 | New York City | United States | Madison Square Garden | | |
| 11 December 2013 | Philadelphia | United States | Wells Fargo Center | | |
| 14 December 2013 | Montreal | Canada | Bell Centre | | |
| 15 December 2013 | Toronto | Canada | Air Canada Centre | | |

Festivals and other miscellaneous performances
^{A} This concert was a part of "Norwegian Wood"

Cancellations and rescheduled shows

| 10 April 2013 | United Center | Chicago | Rescheduled to 24 October 2013 |
| 12 April 2013 | Wells Fargo Center | Philadelphia | Rescheduled to 11 October 2013 |
| 13 April 2013 | TD Garden | Boston | Rescheduled to 4 December 2013 |
| 16 April 2013 | Bell Centre | Montreal | Rescheduled to 14 December 2013 |
| 19 April 2013 | Madison Square Garden | New York City | Rescheduled to 9 December 2013 |
| 21 April 2013 | Prudential Center | Newark | Rescheduled to 7 December 2013 |
| 25 April 2013 | The Palace | Auburn Hills | Rescheduled to 26 October 2013 |
| 27 April 2013 | Greensboro Coliseum | Greensboro | Rescheduled to 17 October 2013 |
| 28 April 2013 | Atlanta | Philips Center | Rescheduled to 19 October 2013 |
| 1 May 2013 | Air Canada Centre | Toronto | Rescheduled to 14 December 2013 |
