= As Time Goes By: The Great American Songbook, Volume II =

As Time Goes By: the Great American Songbook, Volume II

Studio album by Rod Stewart
- Released: 14 October 2003
- Studios: Capitol Studios (Hollywood); Departure Studios (Los Angeles); Fox Founce Five (Los Angeles); Reagan's Garage (Los Angeles); Sony Music Studios (London); Hit Factory Criteria (Miami); Right Track Recording (New York); The Shed (New York); The Loft (Bronxville, New York); Simon Climie Studio (Villefranche-sur-Mer, France)
- Genre: Traditional pop
- Length: 45:57
- Label: J
- Producers: Richard Perry; Phil Ramone; Carl Sturken and Evan Rogers; Clive Davis

Rod Stewart chronology
It Had to Be You: The Great American Songbook (2002)	As Time Goes By: the Great American Songbook, Volume II (2003)	Stardust: The Great American Songbook, Volume III (2004)

Professional ratings
Review scores
Source	Rating
AllMusic	2/5 stars
Blender	3/5 stars
Robert Christgau	(2-star Honorable Mention)
The Rolling Stone Album Guide	1.5/5 stars

As Time Goes By: the Great American Songbook, Volume II is Rod Stewart's second album of pop standards, and his 21st album overall. It was released on 14 October 2003 by J Records.

== Track listing ==
No.	Title	Writer(s)	Producer(s)	Length
1.	"Time After Time"	Sammy Cahn, Jule Styne	Phil Ramone	2:58
2.	"I'm in the Mood for Love"	Dorothy Fields, Jimmy McHugh	Richard Perry	3:07
3.	"Don't Get Around Much Anymore"	Duke Ellington, Bob Russell	Ramone	2:48
4.	"Bewitched, Bothered & Bewildered" (duet with Cher)	Richard Rodgers, Lorenz Hart	Perry	4:14
5.	"Till There Was You"	Meredith Willson	Evan Rogers, Carl Sturken, Rob Mathes^{[a]}	2:51
6.	"Until the Real Thing Comes Along"	Cahn, Saul Chaplin, L.E. Freeman, Mann Holiner, Alberta Nichols	Perry	3:38
7.	"Where or When"	Rodgers, Hart	Rogers, Sturken	3:10
8.	"Smile"	Charlie Chaplin, Geoffrey Claremont Parsons, John Turner	Perry	3:13
9.	"My Heart Stood Still"	Rodgers, Hart	Ramone	3:03
10.	"Someone to Watch Over Me"	George Gershwin, Ira Gershwin	Perry	3:30
11.	"As Time Goes By" (duet with Queen Latifah)	Herman Hupfeld	Perry	3:48
12.	"I Only Have Eyes for You"	Al Dubin, Harry Warren	Ramone	3:06
13.	"Crazy She Calls Me"	Bob Russell, Carl Sigman	Perry	3:27
14.	"Our Love Is Here to Stay"	G. Gershwin, I. Gershwin	Perry	2:57

UK bonus track
No.	Title	Writer(s)	Producer(s)	Length
15.	"My Favourite Things"	Rogers, Oscar Hammerstein II	Ramone	2:55

Japanese bonus tracks
No.	Title	Writer(s)	Length
15.	"My Favourite Things"	Rogers, Hammerstein	2:55
16.	"These Foolish Things (Remind Me of You)" (live; previously issued on It Had to Be You: The Great American Songbook concert DVD)	Jack Strachey, Holt Marvell	3:47
17.	"The Way You Look Tonight" (live; previously issued on It Had to Be You: The Great American Songbook concert DVD)	Jerome Kern, Dorothy Fields	3:50

Notes

- ^a signifies an additional producer
- On the European edition, "Where or When" is a duet with Lisa Ekdahl.
- On the Spanish edition, "I Only Have Eyes for You" is a duet with Ana Belén.

== Personnel ==
Musicians

- Rod Stewart – vocals, whistle (10)
- Henry Hey – acoustic piano (1, 8, 9, 12, 14, 15)
- Rob Mathes – keyboards (1, 3, 5, 9, 12), nylon guitar (3), acoustic piano (5)
- Rob Mounsey – keyboards (1, 3, 12)
- Philippe Saisse – keyboards (1, 3, 9, 12, 15), synth strings (8, 14)
- Michael Thompson – acoustic piano (2, 4, 6, 10, 11, 13), synth strings (2, 4, 6, 8, 10, 11, 13, 14), synth vibraphone solo (14)
- Peter Nero – acoustic piano (3)
- David Spinozza – acoustic guitar (1, 3, 9, 12, 15), guitars (5, 8, 14)
- Dean Parks – guitars (2, 4, 6, 10, 11, 13, 14)
- Aaron Kaplan – guitars (4)
- Larry Koonse – guitars (4, 6, 11, 13)
- Carl Sturken – guitars (5, 7), acoustic piano (7)
- Jimmy Rip – guitars (8, 14)
- Frank Simes – guitars (10)
- David Finck – bass (1, 5, 7–9, 14, 15)
- Reggie McBride – bass (2, 4, 6, 11, 13)
- Tom Barney – bass (3, 12)
- Chris Golden – bass (10)
- Frank Vilardi – drums (1, 9)
- John Ferraro – drums (2, 6)
- Shawn Pelton – drums (3, 8, 12, 14, 15), percussion (5, 15)
- Joe LaBarbera – drums (4, 13)
- Warren Odze – drums (5, 7)
- Jimmy Paxson – drums (10)
- Kendall Kay – drums (11)
- Joe Locke – vibraphone (5)
- Arturo Sandoval – trumpet solo (1, 12)
- Doug Webb – saxophone solo (2, 4, 11), horns (4, 13), alto saxophone (6), clarinets (6), saxophones (11), woodwinds (11, 13), clarinet solo (13)
- Lawrence Feldman – clarinet solo (3)
- Dave Koz – alto saxophone (9)
- Scott Krietzer – tenor saxophone (15)
- Elena Barere – concertmaster (1, 3, 9, 12, 15)
- Ann Kim, Richard Locker and Mark Shuman – cello (1, 3, 9, 12, 15)
- Jean LeBlanc and Richard Locker – cello (5)
- Adria Benjamin, Monica Gerard, Mary Hammann and Vincent Lionti – viola (1, 3, 9, 12, 15)
- Elena Barere, Avril Brown, Cenovia Cummings, Maura Giannini, Ann Leathers, Laura McGinnis, Jan Mullen, Marti Sweet, Ricky Sortomme, Yuri Vodovoz and Carol Webb – violin (1, 3, 9, 12, 15)
- Cher – vocals (4)
- Queen Latifah – vocals (11)

Music arrangements

- Rob Mathes – rhythm arrangements (1, 3, 8, 9, 12, 14), string arrangements (5), arrangements (15)
- Rob Mounsey – string arrangements (1, 3, 12), string conductor (1, 3, 9, 12)
- Richard Perry – rhythm arrangements (2, 4, 6, 8, 10, 11, 13, 14), vocal arrangements (4)
- Michael Thompson – rhythm arrangements (2, 4, 6, 8, 10, 11, 13, 14), horn arrangements (4, 11, 13), saxophone and clarinet arrangements (6), woodwind arrangements (11, 13)
- Philippe Saisse – string arrangements (3, 9)
- Alan Broadbent – string arrangements and conductor (4)
- Arnold Stiefel – vocal arrangements (4)
- Colin Freeman – string arrangements and conductor (6)
- Lauren Wild – rhythm arrangements (8, 10)
- Mort Lindsey – string arrangements and conductor (10, 14)

== Production ==
- Steve Ferrera – A&R
- Clive Davis – album producer
- Richard Perry – album producer
- Phil Ramone – album producer
- Lauren Wild – associate producer (2, 4, 6, 8, 10, 11, 13, 14)
- Jill Dell'Abate – production manager and music contractor (1, 3, 9, 12), additional production coordinator (5)
- Ben McCarthy – production assistant (2, 4, 6, 8, 10, 11, 13, 14)
- Andrea Derby – production coordinator (5, 7)
- Alli Truch – creative director
- Jeri Heiden – art direction
- Andrew MacPherson – photography
- Lotus Donovan – project manager
- Arnold Stiefel – management

Technical credits

- Doug Sax – mastering
- Robert Hadley – mastering
- The Mastering Lab (Hollywood California) – mastering location
- Drew L. – special production support at Quality CD Duplication (Los Angeles, California) (2, 4, 6, 8, 10, 11, 13, 14)
- Joel Moss –recording (1, 3, 5, 9, 12)
- Eric Schilling – recording (1, 3, 9, 12, 15)
- Frank Filipetti – mixing (1, 3, 9, 12), recording (3, 12)
- Jason Stasium – Pro Tools operator (1, 3, 9, 12, 15), assistant engineer (5), mix assistant (5)
- Carter Humphrey – recording (2, 4, 6, 10, 11, 13), mixing (2, 4, 6, 8, 11, 13, 14), vocal recording (11)
- Bobby Ginsburg – mixing (2, 10), vocal recording (4, 11, 13)
- Jan Folkson – mixing (5), additional Pro Tools engineer (5)
- Al Hemberger – recording (5, 7), mixing (7)
- Ray Bardani – recording (8, 14)
- J.J. Blair – recording (10)
- Chris Carroll – additional engineer (1, 3, 9, 12, 15)
- Mike Gilnes – additional engineer (1, 3, 9, 12, 15)
- Pete Karam – additional engineer (1, 3, 9, 12, 15), mixing (15)
- Michael O'Reilly – additional engineer (1, 3, 9, 12, 15)
- Steve Orchard – additional engineer (1, 3, 9, 12, 15)
- Mark Gonzalez – additional engineer and Pro Tools operator (2, 4, 6, 8, 10, 11, 13, 14)
- Aaron Kaplan – additional engineer and Pro Tools operator (2, 4, 6, 8, 10, 11, 13, 14)
- Pooya Salettyar – additional engineer and Pro Tools operator (2, 4, 6, 8, 10, 11, 13, 14)
- Pablo Soloranzo – additional engineer and Pro Tools operator (2, 4, 6, 8, 10, 11, 13, 14)
- Matt Noble – additional engineer (5, 7)
- Patrick Magee – assistant engineer (1, 3, 9, 12, 15)
- Tim Olstead – assistant engineer (1, 3, 9, 12, 15)
- Jay Spears – assistant engineer (1, 3, 9, 12, 15), mix assistant (1, 3, 9, 12, 15)
- Jason Finkle – assistant engineer (5), mix assistant (5)
- Roy Matthews – assistant engineer (5, 7)

== Charts ==
=== Weekly charts ===
Chart (2003)	Peak position
Australian Albums (ARIA)	7
Belgian Albums (Ultratop Flanders)	26
Canadian Albums (Billboard)	1
Dutch Albums (Album Top 100)	35
German Albums (Offizielle Top 100)	38
Irish Albums (IRMA)	14
New Zealand Albums (RMNZ)	42
Polish Albums (ZPAV)	2
Scottish Albums (Official Charts)	6
Spanish Albums (Promusicae)	22
Swedish Albums (Sverigetopplistan)	8
Swiss Albums (Schweizer Hitparade)	79
UK Albums (Official Charts)	4
UK Jazz & Blues Albums (Official Charts)	1
US Billboard 200	2
US Top Catalog Albums (Billboard)	7

=== Year-end charts ===
Chart (2003)	Position
Australian Albums (ARIA)	61
Swedish Albums (Sverigetopplistan)	57
UK Albums (OCC)	34
US Billboard 200	116
Worldwide Albums (IFPI)	21

Chart (2004)	Position
Australian Albums (ARIA)	64
Swedish Albums (Sverigetopplistan)	83
UK Albums (OCC)	198
US Billboard 200	38

== Certifications ==
Region	Certification	Certified units/sales
Argentina (CAPIF)	Platinum	40,000^{^}
Australia (ARIA)	2× Platinum	140,000^{^}
Brazil (Pro-Música Brasil)	Platinum	125,000^{*}
Canada (Music Canada)	2× Platinum	200,000^{^}
Poland (ZPAV)	Platinum	40,000^{*}
Sweden (GLF)	Gold	30,000^{^}
United Kingdom (BPI)	2× Platinum	600,000^{^}
United States (RIAA)	2× Platinum	2,000,000^{^}
^{*} Sales figures based on certification alone.^{^} Shipments figures based on certification alone.
