= It Had to Be You: The Great American Songbook =

Studio album by Rod Stewart
- Released: 22 October 2002
- Studios: Record Plant, Signet Sound Studios, Tal2 Studios and Westlake Audio (Los Angeles, California); Conway Studios, Cello Studios, Henson Recording Studios and Tyrell Studios (Hollywood, California); Crescent Moon Studios (Miami, Florida); Right Track Recording (New York City, New York); Chicago Recording Company (Chicago, Illinois)
- Genre: Traditional pop
- Length: 49:08
- Label: J
- Producers: Clive Davis; Richard Perry; Phil Ramone

Rod Stewart chronology
The Story So Far: The Very Best of Rod Stewart (2001)	It Had to Be You: The Great American Songbook (2002)	As Time Goes By: The Great American Songbook, Volume II (2003)

Professional ratings
Aggregate scores
Source	Rating
Metacritic	42/100
Review scores
Source	Rating
AllMusic	2.5/5 stars
BBC Music	mixed
Billboard	favourable
Blender	1/5 stars
E! Online	C+
The Guardian	2/5 stars
Q	1/5 stars
Robert Christgau	(3-star Honorable Mention)
Rolling Stone	2/5 stars
Uncut	2/5 stars
The Daytona Beach News-Journal	3/5 stars
San Francisco Chronicle	4/5 stars
Philadelphia Daily News	B+

It Had to Be You: The Great American Songbook is the first album of American pop standards recorded by British musician Rod Stewart, and his 20th album overall. It was released on 22 October 2002, and became the first in a five-volume series.

The album was Stewart's first release for Sony Music imprint J Records. It included his second recording of "Ev'ry Time We Say Goodbye".

A live DVD of the same title was released on 4 February 2003, which featured performances of material from the studio album as well as Stewart's earlier material.

== Track listing ==
No.	Title	Writer(s)	Producer(s)	Length
1.	"You Go to My Head"	John Frederick Coots, Haven Gillespie	Richard Perry	4:17
2.	"They Can't Take That Away from Me"	George Gershwin, Ira Gershwin	Perry	3:25
3.	"The Way You Look Tonight"	Dorothy Fields, Jerome Kern	Perry	3:49
4.	"It Had to Be You"	Isham Jones, Gus Kahn	Phil Ramone	3:24
5.	"That Old Feeling"	Lew Brown, Sammy Fain	Ramone	2:54
6.	"These Foolish Things (Remind Me of You)"	Harry Link, Holt Marvell, Jack Strachey	Ramone	3:48
7.	"The Very Thought of You"	Ray Noble	Perry	3:20
8.	"Moonglow"	Eddie DeLange, Will Hudson, Irving Mills	Ramone	3:32
9.	"I'll Be Seeing You"	Fain, Irving Kahal	Ramone	3:51
10.	"Ev'ry Time We Say Goodbye"	Cole Porter	Ramone	3:27
11.	"The Nearness of You"	Hoagy Carmichael, Ned Washington	Perry	3:00
12.	"For All We Know"	Coots, Sam M. Lewis	Ramone	3:24
13.	"We'll Be Together Again"	Carl T. Fischer, Frankie Laine	Perry	3:54
14.	"That's All"	Alan Brandt, Bob Haymes	Ramone	3:03
Total length:				49:08

== Personnel ==
Musicians

- Rod Stewart – vocals
- Will Hollis – acoustic piano (1, 2), string synthesizers (2), synth vibraphone solo (3)
- Renato Neto – acoustic piano (1), string synthesizer (1), synth flute (13)
- Randy Kerber – acoustic piano (3, 7, 13), string synthesizer (3, 7, 13)
- Andy Chukerman – synthesizer pad (3, 7, 11, 13)
- Rob Mounsey – keyboards (4, 5, 8), acoustic piano (4, 5)
- Philippe Saisse – keyboards (4–6, 8–10, 12, 14)
- Doug Katsaros – acoustic piano (6)
- Russ Kassoff – acoustic piano (8, 10, 12, 14)
- Lee Musiker – acoustic piano intro (9)
- Don Sebesky – acoustic piano (9)
- Randy Waldman – acoustic piano (11)
- Jim Fox – guitars (1)
- Jimmy Rip – guitars (1, 2)
- Bob Mann – guitars (3, 7, 13), guitar solo (7)
- Jeff Mironov – guitars (4–6, 8–10, 12, 14), guitar solo (14)
- Dennis Budimir – guitars (11)
- Dave Carpenter – bass (1)
- Reggie McBride – bass (2)
- Bob Magnusson – bass (3, 7, 13)
- David Finck – bass (4–6, 8–10, 12, 14)
- Chuck Domanico – bass (11)
- Tal Bergman – drums (1), drum programming (1), percussion (7), kick drum programming (11)
- John Ferraro – drums (2), percussion (7)
- Allan Schwartzberg – drums (3, 7, 13)
- Shawn Pelton – drums (4–6, 8–10, 12, 14)
- Harvey Mason – drums (11)
- Dan Higgins – clarinet solo (1), alto saxophone solo (2)
- Michael Brecker – tenor saxophone solo (4)
- Dave Koz – tenor saxophone solo (6, 10)
- Arturo Sandoval – trumpet solo (5), flugelhorn solo (8)
- Chris Botti – trumpet solo (13)

Music arrangements

- Tal Bergman – arrangements (1)
- Renato Neto – arrangements (1)
- Richard Perry – arrangements (1), basic track arrangement (2)
- Will Hollis – string synthesizer and solo arrangements (2)
- Bob Mann – arrangements (3, 7, 13)
- Rob Mounsey – rhythm arrangements and conductor (4)
- Don Sebesky – orchestra arrangements and conductor (4, 8, 12), rhythm arrangements and conductor (4, 8, 12), arrangements and conductor (9)
- Doug Katsaros – rhythm arrangements (5), arrangements and conductor (6, 10, 14)
- Philippe Saisse – orchestra arrangements and conductor (5, 8, 12)
- Jeremy Lubbock – string arrangements and conductor (11), woodwind arrangements and conductor (11)

== Production ==
- Keith Naftaly – A&R
- Clive Davis – producer
- Richard Perry – producer (1–3, 7, 11, 13)
- Phil Ramone – producer (4–6, 8–10, 12, 14), vocal production (11)
- Tal Bergman – associate producer (1)
- Renato Neto – associate producer (1)
- Ben McCarthy – production coordinator (1–3, 7, 11, 13)
- Daphna Kaster –music consultant (1–3, 7, 11, 13)
- Jill Dell'Abate – production manager and music contractor (4–6, 8–10, 12, 14)
- Alli Truch – creative director
- Jeri Heiden for SMOG L.A. – art direction
- Andrew MacPherson – photography
- Rod Stewart – liner notes
- Bill Zehme – liner notes
- Annie Challis – management
- Arnold Stiefel – management

Technical credits

- Stephen Marcussen – mastering (1–3, 7, 11, 13) at Marcussen Mastering (Hollywood, California)
- Ted Jensen – mastering (4–6, 8–10, 12, 14) at Sterling Sound (New York City, New York)
- Lauren Wild – special production support at Tyrell Studios (1–3, 7, 11, 13)
- Larry Emerine and Don Tyler – additional production support at Precision Lacquer (Hollywood, California) (1–3, 7, 11, 13)
- Drew L. – additional production support at Quality CD Duplication (Los Angeles, California) (1–3, 7, 11, 13)
- Carter Humphrey – mixing (1–3, 7, 11, 13), recording (2, 3)
- Mark Valentine – recording (1)
- Jeffrey "Woody" Woodruff – recording (2, 3, 7, 11, 13), additional engineer (4–6, 8–10, 12, 14)
- Frank Filipetti – recording (4–6, 8–10, 12, 14), mixing (4–6, 8–10, 12, 14)
- J.J. Blair – additional engineer and Pro Tools technician (1–3, 7, 11, 13)
- Brian Cook – additional engineer and Pro Tools technician (1–3, 7, 11, 13)
- Steve Deutsch – additional engineer and Pro Tools technician (1–3, 7, 11, 13), Pro Tools operator (4–6, 8–10, 12, 14)
- Alex Gibson – additional engineer and Pro Tools technician (1–3, 7, 11, 13)
- Bobby Ginsberg – additional engineer and Pro Tools technician (1–3, 7, 11, 13)
- Johnny Kubelka – additional engineer and Pro Tools technician (1–3, 7, 11, 13)
- Trent Slatton – additional engineer and Pro Tools technician (1–3, 7, 11, 13)
- Joel Moss – additional engineer (4–6, 8–10, 12, 14)
- Freddy Pinero – additional engineer (4–6, 8–10, 12, 14)
- Chris Steinmetz – additional engineer (4–6, 8–10, 12, 14)
- Wade Childers – assistant engineer (4–6, 8–10, 12, 14)
- Brian Dixon – assistant engineer (4–6, 8–10, 12, 14)
- Andrew Felluss – assistant engineer (4–6, 8–10, 12, 14), mix assistant (4–6, 8–10, 12, 14), Pro Tools operator (4–6, 8–10, 12, 14)
- Nick Howard – assistant engineer (4–6, 8–10, 12, 14)
- Timothy Olmstead – assistant engineer (4–6, 8–10, 12, 14), mix assistant (4–6, 8–10, 12, 14)
- Ryan Smith – assistant engineer (4–6, 8–10, 12, 14)
- Pete Karam – Pro Tools operator (4–6, 8–10, 12, 14)

== Live DVD ==
1. "Forever Young" (Jim Cregan, Kevin Savigar, Bob Dylan, Rod Stewart)
2. "Some Guys Have All the Luck" (Jeff Fortgang)
3. "They Can't Take That Away from Me" (G. Gershwin, I. Gershwin)
4. "The Way You Look Tonight" (Fields, Kern)
5. "These Foolish Things" (Link, Marvell, Strachey)
6. "Moonglow" (DeLange, Hudson, Mills)
7. "Every Time We Say Goodbye" (Porter)
8. "The Very Thought of You" (Noble)
9. "That Old Feeling" (Brown, Fain)
10. "You Go to My Head" (Coots, Gillespie)
11. "For All We Know" (Coots, Lewis)
12. "The Nearness of You" (Carmichael, Washington)
13. "That's All" (Brandt, Haymes)
14. "We'll Be Together Again" (Fischer, Laine)
15. "Rhythm of My Heart" (Marc Jordan, John Capek)
16. "Downtown Train" (Tom Waits)
17. "Maggie May" (Stewart, Martin Quittenton)
18. "Young Turks" (Stewart, Carmine Appice, Duane Hitchings, Savigar)
19. "Hot Legs" (Stewart, Gary Grainger)
20. "Having a Party" (Sam Cooke)
21. "I'll Be Seeing You" (Fain, Kahal)
22. "It Takes Two" (William "Mickey" Stevenson, Sylvia Moy)

== Charts ==
=== Weekly charts ===
Chart (2002–2003)	Peak position
Australian Albums (ARIA)	5
Austrian Albums (Ö3 Austria)	41
Belgian Albums (Ultratop Flanders)	35
Canadian Albums (Billboard)	10
Dutch Albums (Album Top 100)	11
German Albums (Offizielle Top 100)	26
Irish Albums (IRMA)	40
New Zealand Albums (RMNZ)	46
Norwegian Albums (VG-lista)	16
Polish Albums (ZPAV)	2
Portuguese Albums (AFP)	17
Scottish Albums (Official Charts)	8
Swedish Albums (Sverigetopplistan)	24
Swiss Albums (Schweizer Hitparade)	81
UK Albums (Official Charts)	8
US Billboard 200	4

=== Year-end charts ===
Year-end chart performance for It Had to Be You: The Great American Songbook
Chart (2002)	Position
Canadian Albums (Nielsen SoundScan)	49
UK Albums (OCC)	47
Worldwide Albums (IFPI)	35
Chart (2003)	Position
Australian Albums (ARIA)	18
Dutch Albums (Album Top 100)	62
UK Albums (OCC)	135
US Billboard 200	34
Chart (2004)	Position
US Billboard 200	109

== Certifications ==
=== Album ===
Region	Certification	Certified units/sales
Argentina (CAPIF)	Platinum	40,000^{^}
Australia (ARIA)	3× Platinum	210,000^{^}
Brazil (Pro-Música Brasil)	Platinum	125,000^{*}
Canada (Music Canada)	3× Platinum	300,000^{^}
Mexico (AMPROFON)	Gold	75,000^{^}
Poland (ZPAV)	Platinum	40,000^{*}
Sweden (GLF)	Gold	30,000^{^}
United Kingdom (BPI)	2× Platinum	600,000^{*}
United States (RIAA)	3× Platinum	3,000,000^{^}
^{*} Sales figures based on certification alone.^{^} Shipments figures based on certification alone.

=== DVD ===
Region	Certification	Certified units/sales
Argentina (CAPIF)	Platinum	8,000^{^}
Australia (ARIA)	8× Platinum	120,000^{^}
Brazil (Pro-Música Brasil)	Platinum	50,000^{*}
Canada (Music Canada)	3× Platinum	30,000^{^}
Mexico (AMPROFON)	Gold	10,000^{^}
United Kingdom (BPI)	Platinum	50,000^{*}
United States (RIAA)	Platinum	100,000^{^}
^{*} Sales figures based on certification alone.^{^} Shipments figures based on certification alone.
