= Lisa Hilton =

Lisa Hilton may refer to:

- Lisa Hilton (writer) (born 1974), British writer of history books
- Lisa Hilton (musician), American jazz pianist, composer and bandleader
