= Lazarus (soundtrack) =

Lazarus (Original Cast Recording)

Soundtrack album by David Bowie and the New York cast of Lazarus
- Released: 21 October 2016
- Recorded: January – May 2015 and 11 January 2016
- Length: 81:57
- Labels: Jones Tintoretto Entertainment; Lazarus Productions; ISO; Columbia; RCA; Sony Music
- Producers: David Bowie; Henry Hey

David Bowie chronology
Who Can I Be Now? (1974–1976) (2016)	Lazarus (Original Cast Recording) (2016)	Legacy (2016)

Professional ratings
Aggregate scores
Source	Rating
Metacritic	71/100
Review scores
Source	Rating
NME	4/5 stars
The Observer	3/5 stars
Pitchfork	6.2/10
Rolling Stone	3.5/5 stars
Uncut	7/10 stars

Lazarus (Original Cast Recording) is an album by the New York cast of the musical Lazarus, which was written by David Bowie and Enda Walsh, with music by David Bowie – orchestrated by Henry Hey. The album was released on 21 October 2016. The album includes three previously unreleased songs by Bowie, "No Plan", "Killing a Little Time" and "When I Met You". The album was scheduled and recorded on 11 January 2016, which turned out to be the day after Bowie's death. The musicians and cast were notified upon arriving at the studio; their emotional performances are captured on the recording. This album was produced by David Bowie and Henry Hey and recorded and mixed by Kevin Killen.

== Track listing ==
Disc one
No.	Title	Artist(s)	Length
1.	"Hello Mary Lou (Goodbye Heart)"	Ricky Nelson	0:40
2.	"Lazarus"	Michael C. Hall and the cast of Lazarus	3:39
3.	"It's No Game"	Michael C. Hall, Lynn Craig, and the cast of Lazarus	3:53
4.	"This Is Not America"	Sophia Anne Caruso and the cast of Lazarus	4:18
5.	"The Man Who Sold the World"	Charlie Pollack	3:22
6.	"No Plan"	Sophia Anne Caruso	3:35
7.	"Love Is Lost"	Michael Esper and the cast of Lazarus	2:55
8.	"Changes"	Cristin Milioti and the cast of Lazarus	3:58
9.	"Where Are We Now?"	Michael C. Hall and the cast of Lazarus	4:22
10.	"Absolute Beginners"	Michael C. Hall, Cristin Milioti, Michael Esper, Sophia Anne Caruso, Krystina Alabado, and the cast of Lazarus	4:40
11.	"Dirty Boys"	Michael Esper	2:28
12.	"Killing a Little Time"	Michael C. Hall	3:48
13.	"Life on Mars?"	Sophia Anne Caruso	3:48
14.	"All the Young Dudes"	Nicholas Christopher, Lynn Craig, Michael Esper, Sophia Anne Caruso, and the cast of Lazarus	2:55
15.	"Sound and Vision"	David Bowie	0:40
16.	"Always Crashing in the Same Car"	Cristin Milioti	3:12
17.	"Valentine's Day"	Michael Esper and the cast of Lazarus	3:00
18.	"When I Met You"	Michael C. Hall and Krystina Alabado	3:56
19.	"Heroes"	Michael C. Hall, Sophia Anne Caruso, and the cast of Lazarus	4:47
Total length:			63:56

Disc two
No.	Title	Artist(s)	Length
1.	"Lazarus"	David Bowie	6:24
2.	"No Plan"	David Bowie	3:41
3.	"Killing a Little Time"	David Bowie	3:48
4.	"When I Met You"	David Bowie	4:08
Total length:			18:01

== Personnel ==
Cast

- Michael C. Hall as Thomas Jerome Newton
- Cristin Milioti as Newton's assistant, Elly
- Michael Esper as Valentine
- Charlie Pollock as Michael
- Sophia Anne Caruso as Girl (aka Newton's muse)
- Bobby Moreno as Zach
- Lynn Craig as Maemi
- Nicholas Christopher as Ben
- Krystina Alabado as Teenage Girl #1
- Krista Pioppi as Teenage Girl #2
- Brynn Williams as Teenage Girl #3

Band

- Henry Hey – orchestrator, musical director, pianist
- Kevin Killen - engineer and mixer
- Chris McQueen – guitar 1
- JJ Appleton – guitar 2
- Brian Delaney – drums
- Fima Ephron – bass
- Lucas Dodd – saxophones
- Karl Lyden – trombones

== Charts ==
Chart (2016)	Peak position
Australian Albums (ARIA)	57
Austrian Albums (Ö3 Austria)	51
Belgian Albums (Ultratop Flanders)	17
Belgian Albums (Ultratop Wallonia)	36
Dutch Albums (Album Top 100)	19
French Albums (SNEP)	48
German Albums (Offizielle Top 100)	62
Irish Albums (IRMA)	16
New Zealand Heatseekers Albums (RMNZ)	4
Scottish Albums (Official Charts)	8
Spanish Albums (PROMUSICAE)	39
Swiss Albums (Schweizer Hitparade)	85
UK Albums (Official Charts)	10
UK Album Downloads (Official Charts)	28
US Billboard 200	129

== Release history ==
Region	Date	Format	Label	Ref.
Worldwide	21 October 2016	Digital download	Columbia Records; Tintoretto Entertainment; Lazarus Productions	
Worldwide	21 October 2016	CD	RCA Records	
Worldwide	21 October 2016	Vinyl	RCA Records; ISO	
Worldwide	21 October 2016	Vinyl	Sony Music Entertainment (coloured vinyl)	
