= Fly Me to the Moon... The Great American Songbook Volume V =

Studio album by Rod Stewart
- Released: 19 October 2010
- Studios: Westlake Studios and Reagan's Garage (Los Angeles, California); Conway Studios and EastWest Studios (Hollywood, California)
- Genres: Jazz; traditional pop
- Length: 39:43
- Label: J
- Producers: Richard Perry; Rod Stewart; Clive Davis; Lauren Wild

Rod Stewart chronology
| Soulbook (2009) | Fly Me to the Moon... The Great American Songbook Volume V (2010) | Merry Christmas, Baby (2012) |

Professional ratings
Aggregate scores
| Source | Rating |
|---|---|
| Metacritic | 51/100 |
Review scores
| Source | Rating |
| AllMusic | 2.5/5 stars |
| American Songwriter | 2.5/5 stars |
| Mojo | 3/5 stars |
| Uncut | 2/5 stars |

Fly Me to the Moon... The Great American Songbook Volume V is the fifth title in Rod Stewart's series of covers of pop standards, released on 19 October 2010, and his 26th studio album overall. It has sold 363,000 copies as of October 2012.

== Reception ==
In 2015, Bob Dylan said of the record: "I was looking forward to hearing Rod [Stewart]'s records of standards. I thought if anybody could bring something different to these songs, Rod certainly could. But the records were disappointing. Rod's a great singer, but there's no point putting a 30-piece orchestra behind him. I'm not going to knock anybody's right to make a living, but you can always tell if somebody's heart and soul is into something, and I didn't think Rod was into it in that way. It sounds like so many records where the vocals are overdubbed, and these kind of songs don't come off well if you use modern recording techniques."

== Track listing ==
1. "That Old Black Magic" (Harold Arlen, Johnny Mercer) – 4:35
2. "Beyond the Sea" (Jack Lawrence, Charles Trenet) – 3:25
3. "I've Got You Under My Skin" (Cole Porter) – 3:50
4. "What a Difference a Day Makes" (Stanley Adams, María Grever) – 3:21
5. "I Get a Kick Out of You" (Porter) – 3:32
6. "I've Got the World on a String" (Arlen, Ted Koehler) – 2:52
7. "Love Me or Leave Me" (Walter Donaldson, Gus Kahn) – 3:07
8. "My Foolish Heart" (Ned Washington, Victor Young) – 3:37
9. "September in the Rain" (Al Dubin, Harry Warren) – 2:55
10. "Fly Me to the Moon" (Bart Howard) – 2:45
11. "Sunny Side of the Street" (Dorothy Fields, Jimmy McHugh) – 2:56
12. "Moon River" (Henry Mancini, Mercer) – 2:48

Limited edition bonus CD

1. "Bye Bye Blackbird" (Mort Dixon, Ray Henderson) – 4:09
2. "All of Me" (Gerald Marks, Seymour Simons) – 3:09
3. "She's Funny That Way" (Neil Moret, Richard A. Whiting) – 3:23
4. "Cheek to Cheek" (Irving Berlin) – 3:29
5. "Ain't Misbehavin'" (Harry Brooks, Andy Razaf, Fats Waller) – 3:48
6. "When I Fall in Love" (Edward Heyman, Young) – 3:45

== Personnel ==
Musicians

- Rod Stewart – vocals, backing vocals (11)
- Joe Sample – acoustic piano (1, 7)
- Mike Thompson – acoustic piano (1, 2, 4–6, 9, 10, 12), synth strings (11), accordion (12)
- Alex Navarro – synth strings (1–10, 12), acoustic piano (3, 8), vibraphone solo (9)
- Larry Goldings – additional synth strings (3), acoustic piano (11)
- Nick Sample – additional synth strings (4)
- Alicia Morgan – synth strings (7, 12)
- Doug Lloyd – organ (7)
- Larry Koonse – guitars (1, 2, 4, 6, 7, 9, 10, 12)
- Aaron Kaplan – guitars (3, 5, 8, 11)
- Reggie McBride – bass (1, 2)
- Chris Golden – bass (5, 6, 11), double bass (3)
- Trey Henry – bass (4, 7, 9, 10, 12)
- Joel Hamilton – bass (8)
- John Ferraro – drums
- Kalani Das – percussion (1)
- Doug Webb – tenor sax solo (1–3), "stritch" sax solo (5), flute solo (6), tenor saxophone (7, 11), "stritch" saxophone (9), flute (9, 10), clarinet (11)
- Andrew Lippman – trombone solo (2)
- Lee Thornburg – brass parts (3, 9), trumpet solo (4), trombone solo (6), flugelhorn solo (8), flugelhorn (10)
- Tom Evans – clarinet (11)
- Adrian Woods – cello (3, 6)
- Lauren Wild – backing vocals (1, 5, 7–9, 11, 12)
- Angela Michael – backing vocals (7, 9, 11, 12)
- Natasha Pierce – backing vocals (7)
- Jeffrey Purrough – backing vocals (7)

Credits (bonus tracks 1–6)

- Rod Stewart – lead vocals
- Mike Thompson – acoustic piano (1, 2, 4–6), synth strings (6)
- Alex Navarro – synth strings (1–3, 5), acoustic piano (3), vibraphone solo (5)
- Aaron Kaplan – guitars (1–4, 6)
- Larry Koonse – guitars (1, 5)
- Trey Henry – bass (1, 2, 5)
- Chris Golden – bass (4, 6)
- Reggie McBride – double bass (3)
- John Ferraro – drums
- Kalani Das – percussion (1)
- Doug Webb – clarinet solo (1), tenor sax solo (3, 6), tenor saxophone (4), clarinet (4), flute (4)
- Lee Thornburg – trumpet solo (2, 3)
- Ariana Hall – backing vocals (1)
- Anita Pointer – backing vocals (1)
- Lauren Wild – backing vocals (1, 4, 5)
- Angela Michael – backing vocals (1, 4)

Music arrangements

- Clive Davis – arrangements
- Richard Perry – arrangements
- Mike Thompson – arrangements
- Lauren Wild – arrangements, BGV arrangements
- Mike Navarro – synth string arrangements
- Alan Broadbent – live string arrangements
- Lee Thornburg – additional horn arrangements
- Doug Webb – additional horn arrangements

== Production ==
- Richard Perry – producer
- Clive Davis – co-producer
- Rod Stewart – co-producer, liner notes
- Lauren Wild – co-producer
- Jamie Leffler – production assistant
- Ben McCarthy – production assistant
- Josh Cheuse – art direction, design
- Mark Seliger – photography
- Ketil Dietrichson – inside front cover photography
- Annie Psaltiras – styling
- David Cox – grooming
- Arnold Stiefel – liner notes, management
- Lotus Donovan for Stiefel Entertainment – project manager
- Zoe Karatzaferis – executive assistant

Technical credits

- Stephen Marcussen – mastering at Marcussen Mastering (Hollywood, California)
- Carter William Humphrey – track recording, string recording
- Jeffrey Purrough – track recording, string recording, mixing
- Richard Perry – mixing
- Rob Gaudet – additional engineer, Pro Tools
- Bobby Ginsburg – additional engineer, Pro Tools
- Paul Meyer – additional engineer, Pro Tools
- Todd Steinhauer – additional engineer, Pro Tools
- Seth Waldmann – additional engineer, Pro Tools

== Charts ==
=== Weekly charts ===
| Chart (2010) | Peak position |
|---|---|
| Argentine Albums (CAPIF) | 4 |
| Australian Albums (ARIA) | 4 |
| Austrian Albums (Ö3 Austria) | 42 |
| Belgian Albums (Ultratop Flanders) | 10 |
| Belgian Albums (Ultratop Wallonia) | 15 |
| Canadian Albums (Billboard) | 4 |
| Dutch Albums (Album Top 100) | 78 |
| Finnish Albums (Suomen virallinen lista) | 50 |
| German Albums (Offizielle Top 100) | 25 |
| Hungarian Albums (MAHASZ) | 14 |
| Irish Albums (IRMA) | 20 |
| Italian Albums (FIMI) | 83 |
| Mexican Albums (Top 100 Mexico) | 10 |
| New Zealand Albums (RMNZ) | 9 |
| Polish Albums (ZPAV) | 5 |
| Portuguese Albums (AFP) | 29 |
| Scottish Albums (Official Charts) | 6 |
| Spanish Albums (Promusicae) | 9 |
| Swedish Albums (Sverigetopplistan) | 3 |
| Swiss Albums (Schweizer Hitparade) | 52 |
| UK Albums (Official Charts) | 5 |
| US Billboard 200 | 4 |

=== Year-end charts ===
| Chart (2010) | Position |
|---|---|
| Australian Albums (ARIA) | 57 |
| Swedish Albums (Sverigetopplistan) | 10 |
| UK Albums (OCC) | 50 |

| Chart (2011) | Position |
|---|---|
| Swedish Albums (Sverigetopplistan) | 82 |

== Certifications ==
| Region | Certification | Certified units/sales |
|---|---|---|
| Australia (ARIA) | Gold | 35,000^{^} |
| Canada (Music Canada) | Gold | 40,000^{^} |
| Poland (ZPAV) | Platinum | 20,000^{*} |
| Sweden (GLF) | Gold | 20,000^{‡} |
| United Kingdom (BPI) | Gold | 100,000^{^} |
^{*} Sales figures based on certification alone.^{^} Shipments figures based on certification alone.^{‡} Sales+streaming figures based on certification alone.
