= Still the Same... Great Rock Classics of Our Time =

Studio album by Rod Stewart
- Released: 10 October 2006
- Recorded: 2006
- Studios: Henson Recording Studios (Hollywood, California)
- Genre: Rock
- Length: 46:35
- Label: J
- Producers: John Shanks; Clive Davis

Rod Stewart chronology
Thanks for the Memory: The Great American Songbook 4 (2005)	Still the Same... Great Rock Classics of Our Time (2006)	Soulbook (2009)

Professional ratings
Review scores
Source	Rating
About.com	3/5 stars
AllMusic	2.5/5 stars
Entertainment Weekly	C−
The Guardian	3/5 stars
Music Box	2/5 stars
The Rolling Stone Album Guide	1/5 stars

Still the Same... Great Rock Classics of Our Time is the 24th album by Rod Stewart, released on 10 October 2006. After four years of success singing pop standards from the Great American Songbook, Still the Same was composed of classic rock covers.

The album is produced by Clive Davis and John Shanks (the former also produced the American Songbook albums) and includes rock milestones from the last four decades, including Bonnie Tyler's "It's a Heartache", Badfinger's "Day After Day" and Creedence Clearwater Revival's classic "Have You Ever Seen the Rain?", which was picked as the first single from the album.

The album debuted at number one on the Billboard 200 albums chart with 184,000 copies sold, making it his fifth top 5 and second number-one debut in three years. Stewart said he was "extremely happy" with the accomplishment. The album also reached number one on the New Zealand RIANZ albums chart and was certified 2× Platinum for sales of 30,000 copies.

== Track listing ==
1. "Have You Ever Seen the Rain?" (John Fogerty) – 3:12
2. "Fooled Around and Fell in Love" (Elvin Bishop) – 3:48
3. "I'll Stand by You" (Chrissie Hynde, Thomas Kelly, William Steinberg) – 4:29
4. "Still the Same" (Bob Seger) – 3:38
5. "It's a Heartache" (Ronnie Scott, Steve Wolfe) – 3:32
6. "Day After Day" (Peter Ham) – 3:07
7. "Missing You" (Mark Leonard, Charles Sandford, John Waite) – 4:18
8. "Father and Son" (Cat Stevens) – 3:36
9. "The Best of My Love" (Don Henley, Glenn Frey, JD Souther) – 3:44
10. "If Not for You" (Bob Dylan) – 3:36
11. "Love Hurts" (Boudleaux Bryant) – 3:47
12. "Everything I Own" (David Gates) – 3:06
13. "Crazy Love" (Van Morrison) – 2:42

UK bonus track

14. "Lay Down Sally" (Eric Clapton, Marcy Levy, George Terry) – 4:00

== Personnel ==
=== Musicians ===
- Rod Stewart – lead vocals
- Jamie Muhoberac – acoustic piano (1–7, 9–13), Hammond B3 organ (2, 4–7, 9–13), keyboards (3, 14)
- Patrick Warren – keyboards (1, 2, 5, 6, 8, 10–13)
- Mike Finnigan – Hammond B3 organ (5, 13)
- Dean Parks – acoustic guitar (1, 3, 8, 13), electric guitar (2, 4–12)
- Tim Pierce – acoustic guitar (1, 3, 8), electric guitar (2–13)
- John Shanks – acoustic guitar (1, 8), electric guitar (2–13), backing vocals (3, 6, 10, 11), keyboards (14), guitars (14), bass (14)
- Greg Leisz – pedal steel guitar (2, 10, 11), mandolin (5, 10)
- Leland Sklar – bass (1–8, 10–13)
- Paul Bushnell – bass (9)
- Kenny Aronoff – drums (1–11, 13)
- Jeff Rothschild – drums (12, 14)
- Lenny Castro – percussion (2, 4, 5, 7, 9, 10, 12, 13)
- James Grundler – backing vocals (1, 4–6, 10–12)
- Julia Tillman Waters – backing vocals (2–4, 10, 11, 13, 14)
- Maxine Waters Willard – backing vocals (2–4, 10, 11, 13, 14)

Strings (3, 5, 8, 11–13)

- David Campbell – arrangements
- Suzie Katayama – contractor
- Charlie Bisharat – concertmaster
- Dave Stone – bass (all but 8)
- Suzie Katayama, Daniel Smith and Yao Zhao – cello
- Denyse Buffum, Cheryl Kohfeld and Kazi Pitelka – viola
- Ruth Bruegger, Susan Chatman, Liliana Filipovic, Laurence Greenfield, Peter Kent, Cameron Patrick, Vladamir Polimitidl, Audrey Solomon, David Stenske, John Wittenberg and Shari Zippert – violin

=== Production ===
- Stephen Ferrera – A&R
- John Shanks – producer, studio photography
- Clive Davis – co-producer
- Jeff Rothschild – engineer
- Mark Valentine – additional engineer
- Keith Gretlein – assistant engineer
- Mike Horner – assistant engineer
- Derek Karlquist – assistant engineer
- Tom Syrowski – assistant engineer
- Lars Fox – Pro Tools editing
- John Hanes – additional Pro Tools engineer
- Serban Ghenea – mixing at MixStar Studios (Virginia Beach, Virginia)
- Kevin Mahoney – mix assistant
- Tim Roberts – mix assistant
- Ted Jensen – mastering at Sterling Sound (New York City, New York)
- Shari Sutcliffe – production coordinator, music contractor
- Jane Morledge and SMOG Design, Inc. – art direction
- SMOG Design, Inc. – design
- Simon Emmett – photography
- Anthony Harvey – concert photography
- Charlotte Cave – groomer
- Lucy Manning – stylist
- Arnold Stiefel for Stiefel Entertainment – management
- Lotus Donovan – project manager
- Jackie Oberhauser – executive assistant

== Charts ==
=== Weekly charts ===
Chart (2006)	Peak position
Australian Albums (ARIA)	16
Austrian Albums (Ö3 Austria)	11
Belgian Albums (Ultratop Flanders)	22
Belgian Albums (Ultratop Wallonia)	9
Canadian Albums (Billboard)	1
Dutch Albums (Album Top 100)	51
French Albums (SNEP)	17
German Albums (Offizielle Top 100)	8
Hungarian Albums (MAHASZ)	24
Irish Albums (IRMA)	21
New Zealand Albums (RMNZ)	1
Polish Albums (ZPAV)	15
Portuguese Albums (AFP)	28
Spanish Albums (Promusicae)	7
Swedish Albums (Sverigetopplistan)	5
Swiss Albums (Schweizer Hitparade)	19
UK Albums (Official Charts)	4
US Billboard 200	1

=== Year-end charts ===
Chart (2006)	Position
Swedish Albums (Sverigetopplistan)	71
UK Albums (OCC)	63
US Billboard 200	169
Chart (2007)	Position
US Billboard 200	180

== Certifications ==
Region	Certification	Certified units/sales
Argentina (CAPIF)	2× Platinum	80,000^{^}
Australia (ARIA)	Platinum	70,000^{^}
Brazil (Pro-Música Brasil)	Gold	30,000^{*}
Canada (Music Canada)	Platinum	100,000^{^}
Hungary (MAHASZ)	Gold	3,000^{^}
Ireland (IRMA)	2× Platinum	30,000^{^}
Mexico (AMPROFON)	Gold	50,000^{^}
New Zealand (RMNZ)	2× Platinum	30,000^{^}
Poland (ZPAV)	Gold	10,000^{*}
Spain (Promusicae)	Gold	40,000^{^}
Sweden (GLF)	Gold	30,000^{^}
United Kingdom (BPI)	Platinum	362,941
United States (RIAA)	Gold	500,000^{^}
^{*} Sales figures based on certification alone.^{^} Shipments figures based on certification alone.
