= Soulbook =

Studio album by Rod Stewart
- Released: 17 October 2009
- Recorded: 2009
- Studios: The Celtic House (Los Angeles); Bill Schnee Studios (North Hollywood); The Village Studios (Los Angeles); Capitol Studios (Hollywood); Royal Studios (Memphis, Tennessee); Germano Studios and The Hit Factory (New York City); The 4 Seasons (Palm Beach, Florida); Morrisound (Tampa, Florida)
- Genre: Soul
- Length: 47:13
- Label: J
- Producers: Steve Tyrell; Steven Jordan; Chuck Kentis

Rod Stewart chronology
Still the Same... Great Rock Classics of Our Time (2006)	Soulbook (2009)	Fly Me to the Moon... The Great American Songbook Volume V (2010)

Professional ratings
Aggregate scores
Source	Rating
Metacritic	52/100
Review scores
Source	Rating
AllMusic	2.5/5 stars
BBC Music	average
The Boston Globe	average
The Daily Telegraph	3/5 stars
Digital Spy	2/5 stars
Entertainment Weekly	C+
The Guardian	2/5 stars
The New York Times	mixed
The Rolling Stone Album Guide	1.5/5 stars
The Seattle Times	average

Soulbook is the 25th studio album by Rod Stewart. Like his previous five albums, Soulbook features Stewart singing old material; for this album he sings classic material from Motown and the soul genre. It was released on 17 October 2009 and was produced by Steve Tyrell, Steven Jordan and Chuck Kentis.

The album became Stewart's sixth consecutive album to debut in the top 5 on the US Billboard 200, peaking at number 4. It also found success in Canada and the UK, making it to number 3 on the Canadian Albums Chart and number 9 on the UK Albums Chart. Furthermore, the album featured at number 41 on the Canadian Albums year-end chart of 2010.

== Track listing ==
Standard version
No.	Title	Writer(s)	Producer(s)	Length
1.	"It's the Same Old Song"	Lamont Dozier, Brian Holland, Eddie Holland	Steve Jordan	4:15
2.	"My Cherie Amour" (featuring Stevie Wonder)	Henry Cosby, Sylvia Moy, Stevie Wonder	Jordan	3:10
3.	"You Make Me Feel Brand New" (duet with Mary J. Blige)	Thom Bell, Linda Epstein	Steve Tyrell	4:36
4.	"(Your Love Keeps Lifting Me) Higher and Higher"	Gary Jackson, Raynard Miner, Carl Smith	Jordan	3:21
5.	"Tracks of My Tears" (featuring Smokey Robinson)	Warren Moore, Smokey Robinson, Marvin Tarplin	Tyrell	3:36
6.	"Let It Be Me" (duet with Jennifer Hudson)	Gilbert Bécaud, Manny Curtis, Pierre Delanoë	Jordan, Harvey Mason Jr.^{[a]}	3:16
7.	"Rainy Night in Georgia"	Tony Joe White	Tyrell	4:13
8.	"What Becomes of the Broken Hearted"	James Dean, Paul Riser, William Weatherspoon	Jordan	3:19
9.	"Love Train"	Kenneth Gamble, Leon Huff	Chuck Kentis, Jordan, Tyrell	3:03
10.	"You've Really Got a Hold on Me"	Robinson	Jordan	3:17
11.	"Wonderful World"	Lou Adler, Herb Alpert, Sam Cooke	Jordan	3:33
12.	"If You Don't Know Me by Now"	Gamble, Huff	Tyrell	3:59
13.	"Just My Imagination"	Barrett Strong, Norman Whitfield	Tyrell	3:35
Total length:				47:13

UK version (bonus tracks)
No.	Title	Writer(s)	Producer(s)	Length
14.	"Never Give You Up"	Jerry Butler, Kenneth Gamble, Leon Huff	Tyrell	3:24
15.	"Only the Strong Survive"	Jerry Butler, Kenneth Gamble, Leon Huff	Tyrell	3:19
Total length:				53:56

Notes

- ^a signifies Jennifer Hudson vocal producer

== Personnel ==
=== Musicians ===
- Rod Stewart – vocals, backing vocals (9)
- Michael Bearden – keyboards (1), Rhodes electric piano (2), Wurlitzer electric piano (4, 11)
- Greg Phillinganes – acoustic piano (2, 4, 14), keyboards (5, 12, 13), backing vocals (5), arrangements (5, 12–14), synthesizers (14)
- Bob Mann – keyboards (3, 15), guitars (3, 7, 15), arrangements (3, 7, 15), mandolin (5)
- David Paich – keyboards (6, 8, 10)
- Henry Hey – acoustic piano (7, 15)
- Chuck Kentis – keyboards (9)
- Charles Hodges – organ (11)
- Ray Parker Jr. – guitars (1, 2, 4, 6, 8–11)
- Dean Parks – guitars (1, 2, 4, 6, 8, 10, 11)
- Paul Jackson Jr. – guitars (3, 5, 12–15)
- Michael Landau – guitars (5, 13, 15)
- Don Kirkpatrick – guitars (9)
- Paul Warren – guitars (9)
- Bob Babbitt – bass (1, 2, 4, 8, 10)
- Reggie McBride – bass (3, 5, 13, 14)
- Darryl Jones – bass (6, 11)
- Leland Sklar – bass (7)
- Conrad Korsch – bass (9)
- Nathan East – bass (12, 15)
- Steve Jordan – drums (1, 2, 4, 6, 8–11), percussion (1, 2, 4, 6, 8–11), backing vocals (9)
- Ricky Lawson – drums (3, 5, 12–15)
- Russ Kunkel – drums (7)
- David Palmer – drums (9)
- Milt Chocolate – vibraphone (2)
- Clayton Cameron – vibraphone (4)
- Lenny Castro – congas (5)
- Tom Scott – baritone saxophone (1), saxophones (8–10), alto sax solo (9)
- Lou Marini – saxophones (9)
- Jim Spake – tenor saxophone (11)
- Jeff Driskill – flute (13)
- John Yoakum – oboe (13)
- George Bohanon – trombone (8, 10)
- Larry Farrell – trombones (9)
- Jack Hale – trombone (11)
- Nick Lane – trombone (15)
- Chuck Findley – trumpet (8, 10)
- Wayne Jackson – trumpet (11)
- Matt Fronke – trumpet (15)
- Brian O'Connor – French horn (14)
- Gayle Levant – harp (6)
- Willie Mitchell – horn arrangements (11)
- Bridget Anne Cady – backing vocals (1–4, 7–11, 14, 15)
- Di Reed – backing vocals (1–4, 7–11, 14, 15)
- Dorian Holley – harmony vocals (2), backing vocals (5)
- Stevie Wonder – vocals (2)
- Mary J. Blige – vocals (3)
- Judith Hill – backing vocals (3, 12)
- Natasha Pearce – backing vocals (3, 7–10, 14, 15)
- Darryl Tookes – backing vocals (3, 5, 7, 12–15)
- Will Wheaton – backing vocals (3, 5, 12, 13)
- Smokey Robinson – vocals (5)
- Lynn Fiddmont – backing vocals (5)
- Pam Trotter – backing vocals (5)
- Lisa Vaughn – backing vocals (5, 13)
- Jennifer Hudson – vocals (6)
- Steve Tyrell – backing vocals (9)

=== String sections ===
The Los Angeles Strings (Tracks 1, 2, 6 & 8)

- Howard Drossin – string arrangements (1, 6, 8)
- Michael Bearden – string arrangements (2)
- David Low – contractor
- Steve Juliani – music copyist
- Bruce Dukov – concertmaster
- David Low and Andrew Shulman – cello
- Robert Brophy, Karen Elaine, Marlow Fisher and David Walther – viola
- Bruce Dukov, Julie Gigante, Phillip Levy, Neli Nikolaeva, Searmi Park, Mark Robertson, Anatoly Rosinsky and Roger Wilkie – violin

Tyrell String Orchestra (Tracks 3, 5, 7 & 12)

- JoAnn Tominaga – contractor
- Charlie Bisharat – concertmaster
- Matt Cooker, Tim Loo, Miguel Martinez and Giovanna Moraga-Clayton – cello
- Brian Benning, Charlie Bisharat, Mark Cargill, Susan Chatman, Nicole Garcia, Neel Hammond, Gina Kronstadt, Joel Pargman, Kathleen Robertson, John Wittenburg and Shari Zippert – violin

The New Memphis Strings (Track 4)

- Willie Mitchell – string arrangements
- Lester Snell – orchestration, music copyist
- Jonathan Kirkscey – string session leader
- Jonathan Kirkscey and Mark Wallace – cello
- Beth Luscombe and Jennifer Puckett – viola
- Roy Brewer, Barrie Cooper, Jessie Munson and Marisa Polesky – violin

== Production ==
- Keith Naftaly – A&R
- JoAnn Tominaga – production coordinator
- Josh Cheuse – art direction, design
- Mark Seliger – photography
- Rod Stewart – sleeve notes
- Loftus Donovan – project manager
- Arnold Stiefel for Stiefel Entertainment – management

Technical credits

- Greg Calbi – mastering at Sterling Sound (New York, NY)
- Niko Bolas – recording (1, 2, 4, 9, 11), mixing (1, 4, 8–10), horn recording (1, 8–10)
- Al Schmitt – string recording (1, 2, 6, 8), recording (6, 8, 10), mixing (6, 11)
- Steve Genewick – BGV recording (1, 11)
- Bill Schnee – mixing (2, 3, 5, 7, 12–15), string recording (3, 5, 7, 12), recording (14, 15)
- Jon Allen – recording (3, 5, 7, 12, 13), vocal recording (14, 15), horn recording (15)
- Lawrence "Boo" Mitchell – horn recording (4, 11), string recording (4)
- Andrew Hey – vocal recording for Jennifer Hudson (6)
- Paul Smith – BGV recording (8, 10)
- Chuck Kentis – recording (9)
- Darwin Best – additional engineer (1–13, 15)
- Kenny Moran – additional engineer (1–13, 14)
- Ryan Petrie – additional engineer (1–13)
- John Kilgore – additional engineer (15)
- Charlie Bybee – string recording assistant (3, 5, 7, 12)
- Martin Pradler – additional Pro Tools editing
- Ross Garfield – drum technician for Steve Jordan
- Chris Gott – drum technician for Steve Jordan
- Paul Jamieson – drum technician for Steve Jordan

== Charts ==
=== Weekly charts ===
Chart (2009)	Peak position
Australian Albums (ARIA)	11
Austrian Albums (Ö3 Austria)	37
Belgian Albums (Ultratop Flanders)	11
Belgian Albums (Ultratop Wallonia)	17
Canadian Albums (Billboard)	3
Dutch Albums (Album Top 100)	95
German Albums (Offizielle Top 100)	33
Irish Albums (IRMA)	17
Mexican Albums (Top 100 Mexico)	22
New Zealand Albums (RMNZ)	4
Polish Albums (ZPAV)	17
Scottish Albums (Official Charts)	7
Spanish Albums (Promusicae)	10
Swedish Albums (Sverigetopplistan)	4
Swiss Albums (Schweizer Hitparade)	46
UK Albums (Official Charts)	9
US Billboard 200	4

Chart (2010)	Peak position
Hungarian Albums Chart	12

=== Year-end charts ===
Chart (2009)	Position
Australian Albums (ARIA)	55
Belgian Albums (Ultratop Flanders)	99
Swedish Albums (Sverigetopplistan)	18
UK Albums (OCC)	31

Chart (2010)	Position
Australian Albums (ARIA)	82
Canadian Albums (Billboard)	41
US Billboard 200	162

== Certifications ==
Region	Certification	Certified units/sales
Australia (ARIA)	Platinum	70,000^{^}
Canada (Music Canada)	Platinum	80,000^{^}
Hungary (MAHASZ)	Platinum	6,000^{^}
Ireland (IRMA)	Gold	7,500^{^}
New Zealand (RMNZ)	Platinum	15,000^{^}
Poland (ZPAV)	Gold	10,000^{*}
Sweden (GLF)	Gold	20,000^{^}
United Kingdom (BPI)	2× Platinum	600,000^{*}
^{*} Sales figures based on certification alone.^{^} Shipments figures based on certification alone.
