= Stardust: The Great American Songbook, Volume III =

Stardust... The Great American Songbook, Volume III

Studio album by Rod Stewart
- Released: 19 October 2004
- Studios: Deep Diner Studios (New York City); RAK Studios (London); Olympic Studios (London); Ocean Way Recording (Hollywood); Bill Schnee Studios (Hollywood); Fox Force Five (Hollywood); Reagan's Garage (Hollywood); Record One (Los Angeles); Seventeen Grand Recording (Nashville); Gravity Studios (Chicago)
- Genre: Traditional pop
- Length: 49:15
- Label: J
- Producers: Clive Davis; Richard Perry; Steve Tyrell; Lauren Wild

Rod Stewart chronology
As Time Goes By... The Great American Songbook, Volume II (2003)	Stardust... The Great American Songbook, Volume III (2004)	Thanks for the Memory... The Great American Songbook, Volume IV (2005)

Professional ratings
Review scores
Source	Rating
AllMusic	2.5/5 stars
The Rolling Stone Album Guide	1.5/5 stars
The Village Voice	average

Stardust... the Great American Songbook, Volume III is the third studio album of pop standards by British musician Rod Stewart, released on 19 October 2004 by J Records, and his 22nd album overall. The album was dedicated to the Tartan Army.

The album was Rod Stewart's first number one on the Billboard 200 since Blondes Have More Fun in 1979. It later became the winner of the 2004 Grammy Award for Best Traditional Pop Vocal Album, giving Stewart his first and, to date, only Grammy victory in his career.

== Track listing ==
No.	Title	Writer(s)	Producer(s)	Length
1.	"Embraceable You"	George Gershwin, Ira Gershwin	Steve Tyrell, Clive Davis	3:30
2.	"For Sentimental Reasons"	William Best, Deek Watson	Tyrell, Davis	3:02
3.	"Blue Moon" (featuring Eric Clapton)	Richard Rodgers, Lorenz Hart	Tyrell, Davis	4:05
4.	"What a Wonderful World" (featuring Stevie Wonder)	Bob Thiele, George David Weiss	Tyrell, Davis	4:30
5.	"Stardust"	Hoagy Carmichael, Mitchell Parish	Richard Perry, Davis, Lauren Wild^{[a]}	4:01
6.	"Manhattan" (duet with Bette Midler)	Rodgers, Hart	Tyrell, Davis	2:53
7.	"'S Wonderful"	G. Gershwin, I. Gershwin	Tyrell, Davis	3:24
8.	"Isn't It Romantic?"	Rodgers, Hart	Tyrell, Davis	3:50
9.	"I Can't Get Started"	Vernon Duke, I. Gershwin	Tyrell, Davis	3:23
10.	"But Not for Me"	G. Gershwin, I. Gershwin	Tyrell, Davis	3:22
11.	"A Kiss to Build a Dream On"	Oscar Hammerstein II, Bert Kalmar, Harry Ruby	Tyrell, Davis	3:13
12.	"Baby, It's Cold Outside" (duet with Dolly Parton)	Frank Loesser	Tyrell, Davis	3:51
13.	"Night and Day"	Cole Porter	Perry, Davis, Wild^{[a]}	3:08
14.	"A Nightingale Sang in Berkeley Square"	Eric Maschwitz, Manning Sherwin	Tyrell, Davis	4:03
Total length:				49:15

Japanese edition bonus tracks
No.	Title	Writer(s)	Length
15.	"You Belong to Me"	Pee Wee King, Chilton Price, Redd Stewart	3:12
16.	"Smile" (previously issued on Volume II)	Charlie Chaplin, Geoffrey Claremont Parsons, John Turner	3:13
Total length:			55:40

Notes

- ^a signifies a co-producer

== Personnel ==
Musicians

- Rod Stewart – vocals
- Ken Ascher – acoustic piano (1, 2, 4, 6, 8, 10, 12–14), additional keyboards (1–4, 6–12, 14), additional synthesizers (1–4, 6–12, 14)
- Bob Mann – additional keyboards (1–4, 6–12, 14), additional synthesizers (1–4, 6–12, 14), guitar (1–4, 6–8, 10–12, 14)
- Joe Sample – acoustic piano (3)
- Mike Thompson – acoustic piano (5), synth strings (5)
- Andy Chuckerman – synth strings (5)
- Dave Grusin – acoustic piano (7, 9)
- Jon Allen – additional keyboards (7)
- Alan Pasqua – acoustic piano (11)
- Lou Forestieri – synth strings (13)
- Eric Clapton – guitar solo (3)
- Vin D'Onofrio – guitar (5, 13)
- Bob Cranshaw – bass (1–4, 7, 12)
- Russ Powell – bass (2–5)
- Chris Golden – bass (5)
- David Finck – bass (6)
- Chip Jackson – bass (8, 9, 11)
- Ed Howard – bass (10)
- Reggie McBride – bass (13)
- John Beal – bass (14)
- Allan Schwartzberg – drums (1–4, 6–12)
- John Ferraro – drums (5, 13, 14)
- Stevie Wonder – harmonica (4)
- Dave Koz – saxophone solo (2, 8)
- Bob Sheppard – clarinets (6), saxophones (6)
- Plas Johnson – saxophone solo (10)
- Tom Evans – saxophone solo (13)
- Warren Vaché Jr. – trumpet solo (1, 9)
- Lee Thornberg – trumpet solo (5)
- Warren Luening – trumpets (6), trumpet solo (7)
- Arturo Sandoval – trumpet solo (11)
- Antoine Silverman – violin solo (14)
- Dorian Holley – backing vocals (4)
- Mortonette Jenkins – backing vocals (4)
- Marlena Jeter – backing vocals (4)
- Bette Midler – vocals (6)
- Dolly Parton – vocals (12)

String sections

- Michael Markman – concertmaster (1–4, 6, 7, 9, 11, 12, 14)
- Antoine Silverman – concertmaster (8, 10)
- Stephen Erdody, Tim Landauer, David Low and Steve Richards – cello (1–4, 6, 7, 9, 11, 12, 14)
- Sarah Carter, Danny Miller and Anja Wood – cello (8, 10)
- Brian Denbow, Janet Lakatos, Jorge Moraga, Dan Neufeld, Simon Oswell, Nancy Roth and David Walther – viola (1–4, 6, 7, 9, 11, 12, 14)
- David Cresswell, Danielle Farina, Debbie Shufelt and Jessica Troy – viola (8, 10)
- Roberto Cani, Franklyn D'Antonio, Bruce Dukov, Julia Gigante, Endre Granat, Ann Landauer, Edie Markman, Michael Markman, Robert Peterson, Katia Popov, Barbara Porter, Gil Romero, Haim Shtrum and Kenneth Yerke – violin (1–4, 6, 7, 9, 11, 12, 14)
- Martin Agee, Chris Cardona, Cenovia Cummings, Jonathan Dinklage, Sylvia D'Avanzo, Max Moston, Antoine Silverman, Belinda Whitney and Paul Woodiel – violin (8, 10)

Music arrangements

- Bob Mann – arrangements and conductor (1–4, 6–12), rhythm arrangements (14)
- Richard Perry – rhythm arrangements (5, 13)
- Mike Thompson – rhythm arrangements (5, 13)
- Alan Broadbent – string arrangements and conductor (14)

== Production ==
- Steve Ferrera – A&R
- Jon Allen – production coordinator (1–4, 6–12, 14)
- Ben McCarthy – production manager (5, 13)
- Shauna Krikorian – administrative assistance (5, 13)
- Alli Truch – creative director
- Jeri Heiden – art direction, design
- John Heiden – art direction, design
- Penny Lancaster – photography
- Andrew MacPherson – photography
- Lotus Donovan – project manager
- Rod Stewart – liner notes
- Luka Scheurer – aide-de-camp to Rod Stewart
- Arnold Stiefel – management
- Jackie Oberhauser – management assistant

Technical credits

- Joe Yannece – mastering at The Hit Factory (New York, NY)
- Andy Zulla – mixing at Sound Decision Studios (New York, NY)
- Bobby Ginsburg – recording (1–4, 6–12, 14)
- Bill Schnee – string recording (1–4, 6–12, 14)
- Simon Climie – guitar solo recording (3)
- Carter Humphrey – recording (5), additional engineer (5, 13)
- Ariel Solanes – trumpet solo recording (11)
- J.J. Blair – recording (13)
- Ryan Petrie – string recording assistant (1–4, 6–12, 14)
- Joel Evenden – guitar solo recording assistant (3)
- Helen Atkinson – additional engineer (1–4, 6–12, 14)
- Darwin Best – additional engineer (1–4, 6–12, 14)
- Raj Das – additional engineer (1–4, 6–12, 14)
- Doug Epstein – additional engineer (1–4, 6–12, 14)
- Michael Teaney – additional engineer (1–4, 6–12, 14)
- Steve Tyrell – additional engineer (1–4, 6–12, 14)
- Dusk Bennett – additional engineer (5, 13)
- Adam Hawkins – additional engineer (5, 13)
- Manny Sanchez – additional engineer (5, 13)
- Nick Sample – additional engineer (5, 13)

== Charts ==
=== Weekly charts ===
Chart (2004)	Peak position
Australian Albums (ARIA)	8
Belgian Albums (Ultratop Flanders)	32
Belgian Albums (Ultratop Wallonia)	65
Canadian Albums (Billboard)	1
Dutch Albums (Album Top 100)	13
Irish Albums (IRMA)	68
New Zealand Albums (RMNZ)	20
Polish Albums (ZPAV)	3
Portuguese Albums (AFP)	13
Swedish Albums (Sverigetopplistan)	3
UK Albums (Official Charts)	3
US Billboard 200	1

Chart (2005)	Peak position
Finnish Albums (Suomen virallinen lista)	37
Norwegian Albums (VG-lista)	17

=== Year-end charts ===
Chart (2004)	Position
Australian Albums (ARIA)	62
Dutch Albums (Album Top 100)	95
Swedish Albums (Sverigetopplistan)	15
UK Albums (OCC)	42
US Billboard 200	119
Worldwide Albums (IFPI)	27

Chart (2005)	Position
Australian Albums (ARIA)	71
Swedish Albums (Sverigetopplistan)	72
UK Albums (OCC)	193
US Billboard 200	67

== Certifications ==
Region	Certification	Certified units/sales
Argentina (CAPIF)	Platinum	40,000^{^}
Australia (ARIA)	Platinum	70,000^{^}
Belgium (BRMA)	Gold	25,000^{*}
New Zealand (RMNZ)	Gold	7,500^{^}
Poland (ZPAV)	Gold	20,000^{*}
Sweden (GLF)	Platinum	60,000^{^}
United Kingdom (BPI)	Platinum	300,000^{^}
United States (RIAA)	Platinum	1,000,000^{^}
^{*} Sales figures based on certification alone.^{^} Shipments figures based on certification alone.
