= Reggie McBride =

American bass player (born 1954)

- Born: September 17, 1954 (age 72); Detroit, Michigan, U.S.
- Genres: Rock; soul; pop; fusion jazz
- Occupations: Musician; record producer
- Instruments: Bass guitar; fretless bass
- Years active: 1969–present

Reggie McBride (born September 17, 1954) is an American bassist.

== Biography ==
McBride was born and raised in Detroit, Michigan, United States; listening to Motown records, he began to play bass at the age of 8. At the age of 14, he played in local bands and by that time, he was a sought after session musician, soon to be on the road with The Dramatics, opening for James Brown. In 1973 he was called by Stevie Wonder to join his band Wonderlove, followed by recording the album Fulfillingness' First Finale in 1974.

Since then he has played, recorded, or toured with some of the most renowned names in music history, such as Elton John, Rod Stewart, Billy Ray Cyrus, Tom Jones, Van Morrison, Eric Burdon, Rick Springfield, Lyle Lovett, Ziggy Marley, Rickie Lee Jones, Ry Cooder, Keb' Mo', Cher, Queen Latifah, jazz greats Herbie Hancock and Al Jarreau, and blues greats John Lee Hooker and B.B. King. He was a member of The Tommy Bolin Band Rare Earth, Glenn Frey, and recently Steven Seagal.

In 2005, he released his first solo record, Element.

== Discography ==
- 1971 – Lazarus – Lazarus
- 1974 – Syreeta Wright – Stevie Wonder Presents: Syreeta
- 1974 – Minnie Riperton – Perfect Angel
- 1974 – Tonto – It's About Time
- 1974 – Stevie Wonder – Fulfillingness' First Finale
- 1975 – Funkadelic – Let's Take It to the Stage
- 1975 – Rare Earth – Back To Earth
- 1975 – Billy Preston – It's My Pleasure
- 1975 – Christopher Rainbow – Home of the Brave
- 1976 – Tommy Bolin – Private Eyes
- 1976 – Rare Earth – Midnight Lady
- 1976 – Phoebe Snow – It Looks Like Snow
- 1977 – Roderick Falconer – Victory in Rock City
- 1977 – Toni & Terry – The Joy
- 1977 – Robby Krieger – Robbie Krieger & Friends
- 1977 – Nacy Shanx – Nancy Shanx
- 1977 – Steve Hillage – Motivation Radio
- 1977 – Michael Quatro – Gettin' Ready
- 1977 – Danny O'Keefe – American Roulette
- 1977 – Van Morrison – A Period of Transition
- 1978 – John Palumbo – Innocent Bystander
- 1978 – Paul Cacia & Janine Cameo – Unbelievable
- 1978 – Brian Cadd – Yesterdaydreams
- 1978 – Steve Harley – Hobo with a Grin
- 1978 – Rare Earth – Grand Slam
- 1978 – Al Jarreau – All Fly Home
- 1979 – Taka Boom – Taka Boom
- 1979 – Evie Sands – Suspended Animation
- 1979 – Energetics – Come Down To Earth
- 1979 – Bill LaBounty – Rain in My Life
- 1979 – Tim Weisberg – Night Rider
- 1979 – Ry Cooder – Bop Till You Drop
- 1980 – Ry Cooder – The Long Riders
- 1980 – Tom Jones – Rescue Me
- 1980 – Ry Cooder – Borderline
- 1980 – Syreeta Wright – Syreeta
- 1980 – Elton John – 21 at 33
- 1980 – Thelma Houston – Breakwater Cat
- 1981 – Billy Preston – The Way I Am
- 1981 – Elton John – The Fox
- 1981 – David Lindley – El Rayo-X
- 1981 – Patty Brard – All This Way
- 1981 – Larry John McNally – Larry John McNally
- 1982 – Patty Brard – You're in the Pocket
- 1982 – Ry Cooder – The Slide Area
- 1982 – Stevie Wonder – Original Musiquarium I
- 1983 – Rickie Lee Jones – Girl at Her Volcano
- 1983 – Matthew Wilder – I Don't Speak the Language
- 1984 – Tina Turner – Private Dancer
- 1984 – Rick Springfield – Hard to Hold
- 1984 – Matthew Wilder – Bouncin' Off The Walls
- 1985 – Joe Lamont – Secret You Hold
- 1985 – Johnny Gill – Chemistry
- 1985 – Robert Forman – Cat Juggling
- 1986 – Larry John McNally – Fade To Black
- 1987 – Wilson Pickett – American Soul Man
- 1987 – Julie Brown – Trapped in the Body of a White Girl
- 1987 – Marc Jordan – Talking Through Pictures
- 1987 – Jessie Allen Cooper – Soft Wave
- 1987 – Dan Hill – Dan Hill
- 1988 – Michel Jonasz – La Fabuleuse Histoire De Mister Swing
- 1988 – Jacques Haurogne – Amour Potentiel
- 1990 – Bobby King – Rhythm, Blues Soul & Grooves
- 1990 – Laquan – Notes of a Native Son
- 1991 – The Don – Wake Up the Party
- 1991 – Bell Biv DeVoe – WBBD-Bootcity: The Remix Album
- 1991 – MC Lyte – Act Like You Know
- 1992 – MC Serch – Return of the Product
- 1992 – Various Artists – White Men Can't Jump
- 1993 – Blood of Abraham – Future Profits
- 1994 – Willy DeVille – Backstreets of Desire
- 1995 – Laurent Voulzy – Voulzy Tour
- 1995 – Kelley Hunt – Kelley Hunt
- 1995 – Michel-Yves Kochmann – Souchon Au Bout Des Doigts
- 1995 – Chris Thomas – 21st Century Blues...From da 'Hood
- 1996 – Thom Rotella – How My Heart Beats
- 1997 – Tommy Bolin Band – Live from Ebbets Field: May 13, 1976
- 1997 – Paul Ventimiglia – Il Bacio
- 1997 – B.B. King – Deuces Wild
- 1998 – John Lee Hooker – The Best of Friends
- 1998 – Keb' Mo' – Slow Down
- 1998 – MC Solaar – Le Tour de la Question
- 1999 – Marty Grebb – Smooth Sailin'
- 1999 – Arthur Adams – Back on Track
- 2000 – Keb' Mo' – The Door
- 2000 – Jimmy Barnes – Soul Deeper
- 2000 – Lisa Hilton – Cocktails at Eight
- 2001 – Lisa Hilton – Feeling Good
- 2001 – Lucky Peterson – Double Dealin'
- 2001 – Jimmy Smith – Dot Com Blues
- 2001 – Laurent Voulzy – Avril
- 2002 – Chris Spedding – One Step Ahead of the Blues
- 2002 – Rod Stewart – It Had To Be You: The Great American Songbook
- 2003 – Paul Cacia – The Opening Act
- 2003 – Lyle Lovett – Smile
- 2003 – Keb' Mo' – Martin Scorsese Presents the Blues: Keb' Mo'
- 2003 – Lisa Hilton – In the Mood for Jazz
- 2003 – Ziggy Marley – Dragonfly
- 2003 – Rod Stewart – As Time Goes By: The Great American Songbook, Volume II
- 2004 – Rod Stewart – Stardust: The Great American Songbook, Volume III
- 2004 – Arthur Adams – Soul of the Blues
- 2004 – Johnny Rivers – Reinvention Highway
- 2004 – Peach – Real Thing
- 2004 – Keb' Mo' – Peace...Back by Popular Demand
- 2004 – Eric Burdon – My Secret Life
- 2004 – Keb' Mo' – Keep It Simple
- 2004 – Lisa Hilton – Jazz After Hours
- 2005 – Star Academy 5 – Star Academy 5: Les Meilleurs Moments
- 2005 – Herbie Hancock – Possibilities
- 2005 – Lisa Hilton – My Favorite Things
- 2005 – Colin James – Limelight
- 2005 – Brian Simpson – It's All Good
- 2005 – Mike Costley – I Am A Singer
- 2005 – Reggie McBride – Element
- 2006 – Keb' Mo' – Suitcase
- 2006 – Eric Burdon – Soul of a Man
- 2006 – Johnny Lee Schell – Schell Game
- 2006 – Chris Thomas King – Rise
- 2006 – Lisa Hilton – Midnight in Manhattan
- 2006 – Steve Madaio – Midnight Rendezvous
- 2006 – Jimmy Barnes – JB50
- 2006 – Robin McKelle – Introducing Robin McKelle
- 2007 – Nils – Ready To Play
- 2007 – John Cruz – One of These Days
- 2007 – Ernie Halter – Congress Hotel
- 2007 – Lisa Hilton – After Dark
- 2008 – Mad Buffalo – Wilderness
- 2008 – Robin McKelle – Modern Antique
- 2008 – Dan O'Sullivan – Little Peeces
- 2008 – Kara Grainger – Grand and Green River
- 2009 – Nils – Up Close and Personal
- 2009 – Solomon King – Under The Sun
- 2009 – Jimmy Barnes – The Rhythm and the Blues
- 2009 – Arthur Adams – Stomp The Floor
- 2009 – Rod Stewart – Soulbook
- 2009 – Keb' Mo' – Live & Mo'
- 2009 – Jeffrey Osbourne – Greatest Hits Live!
- 2009 – Rickie Lee Jones – Balm in Gilead
- 2010 – Jimmy Barnes – Rage and Ruin
- 2010 – Playing For Change – Playing For Change Live
- 2010 – Mindi Abair – In Hi-Fi Stereo
- 2010 – Coco Montoya – I Want It All Back
- 2010 – Nellie McKay – Home Sweet Mobile Home
- 2010 – Rod Stewart – Fly Me to the Moon... The Great American Songbook Volume V
- 2011 – Keb' Mo' – The Reflection
- 2011 – Jeff Johnson – Shine
- 2011 – Playing For Change – PFC 2: Songs Around The World
- 2011 – Michael Grimm – Michael Grimm
- 2011 – Chris Barber – Memories of My Trip
- 2012 – Mitch Ryder – The Promise
- 2012 – Clarence Bekker – Old Soul
- 2012 – Nils – City Groove
- 2012 – Various Artists – Chimes of Freedom
- 2012 – Marek Niedzwiecki – Smooth Jazz Cafe 12
- 2012 – Billy Ray Cyrus – Change My Mind
- 2012 – Glenn Frey – After Hours
- 2013 – Marcella Detroit – The Vehicle
- 2013 – Eric Burdon 'Til Your River Runs Dry
- 2015 – Steve Tyrell – That Lovin' Feeling
