= Thanks for the Memory: The Great American Songbook, Volume IV =

Studio album by Rod Stewart
- Released: 18 October 2005
- Studios: Deep Diner Studios (New York); Capitol Studios (Hollywood); Bill Schnee Studios (North Hollywood); Larrabee Sound Studios (North Hollywood)
- Genres: Traditional pop, jazz
- Length: 43:06
- Label: J
- Producers: Clive Davis; Bob Mann; Steve Tyrell

Rod Stewart chronology
Stardust: The Great American Songbook, Volume III (2004)	Thanks for the Memory: The Great American Songbook, Volume IV (2005)	Still the Same... Great Rock Classics of Our Time (2006)

Professional ratings
Review scores
Source	Rating
AllMusic	2/5 stars
Entertainment Weekly	D
The Rolling Stone Album Guide	1/5 stars

Thanks for the Memory: The Great American Songbook, Volume IV is the fourth title in Rod Stewart's series of covers of pop standards, released on 18 October 2005 for J Records, and his 23rd album overall.

== Track listing ==
No.	Title	Writer(s)	Length
1.	"I've Got a Crush on You" (duet with Diana Ross)	George Gershwin, Ira Gershwin	3:08
2.	"I Wish You Love" (featuring Chris Botti)	Léo Chauliac, Charles Trenet, Albert A. Beach	3:38
3.	"You Send Me" (duet with Chaka Khan)	Sam Cooke	3:36
4.	"Long Ago and Far Away"	Jerome Kern, I. Gershwin	3:11
5.	"Makin' Whoopee" (duet with Elton John)	Walter Donaldson, Gus Kahn	3:44
6.	"My One and Only Love" (featuring Roy Hargrove)	Guy Wood, Robert Mellin	3:25
7.	"Taking a Chance on Love"	Vernon Duke, John Latouche, Ted Fetter	3:27
8.	"My Funny Valentine"	Richard Rodgers, Lorenz Hart	2:49
9.	"I've Got My Love to Keep Me Warm"	Irving Berlin	3:09
10.	"Nevertheless (I'm in Love with You)" (featuring Dave Koz)	Harry Ruby, Bert Kalmar	3:50
11.	"Blue Skies"	Berlin	2:43
12.	"Let's Fall in Love" (featuring George Benson)	Harold Arlen, Ted Koehler	3:15
13.	"Thanks for the Memory"	Leo Robin, Ralph Rainger	3:11
Total length:			43:06

Japanese edition bonus track
No.	Title	Writer(s)	Length
14.	"Cheek to Cheek"	Berlin	3:28
Total length:			47:34

UK edition bonus tracks
No.	Title	Writer(s)	Length
14.	"Cheek to Cheek"	Berlin	3:28
15.	"I've Grown Accustomed to Her Face"	Frederick Loewe, Alan Jay Lerner	3:14
Total length:			50:48

== Personnel ==
Musicians

- Rod Stewart – vocals
- Ken Ascher – acoustic piano, additional keyboards
- Quinn Johnson – additional keyboards
- Bob Mann – additional keyboards, guitar
- Lee Musiker – additional keyboards
- Philippe Saisse – additional keyboards
- George Benson – guitar solo (12)
- David Finck – bass (1–4, 7, 8, 10–15)
- Ed Howard – bass (5, 6, 9)
- Allan Schwartzberg – drums
- Dave Koz – saxophone solo (1), saxophone (10)
- Dan Higgins – clarinet solo (11)
- Chris Botti – trumpet (2)
- Roy Hargrove – trumpet (6)
- Warren Luening – trumpet solo (9, 14)
- Diana Ross – vocals (1)
- Chaka Khan – vocals (3)
- Elton John – vocals (5)

The Orchestra

- Alan Broadbent – arrangements and conductor
- Gene Cipriano, Dan Higgins, Greg Huckins, Bill Liston and Bob Sheppard – clarinets, saxophones
- Larry Corbett and Steve Erdody – principle cellists
- Vage Ayrikyan, Trevor Handy, Paula Hochhalter, Tim Landauer, David Low, Steve Richards and Tina Soule – cello
- Gayle Levant – harp
- Simon Oswell – principle violist
- Robert Becker, Kenneth Burwood-Hoy, Andrew Duckles, Keith Greene, Vicki Miskolczy, Dan Neufeld and David Walther – viola
- Michael Markman – concertmaster, violin
- Darius Campo, Roberto Cani, Kevin Connolly, Lisa Dodlinger, Lorenz Gamma, Armen Garabedian, Berj Garabedian, Julie Gigante, Endre Granat, Lily Ho Chen, Ana Landauer, Phillip Levy, Edith Markman, Sid Page, Melissa Phelps, Gil Romero, Anatoly Rosinsky, Haim Shtrum and Irina Voloshina – violin

== Production ==
- Steve Ferrera – A&R
- Clive Davis – album producer
- Steve Tyrell – album producer, producer
- Bob Mann – co-producer, arrangements
- Heidi Hall – production assistant
- Lewis Karpel – production assistant
- Jon Allen – album coordinator
- Jeri Heiden – art direction, design
- John Heiden – art direction, design
- John Swannell – photography
- Luka Scheurer – aide-de-camp for Rod Stewart
- Lotus Donovan – project manager
- Arnold Stiefel – management
- Jackie Oberhauser – management assistant

Technical credits

- Joe Yannece – mastering at Classic Sound (New York, NY)
- Andy Zulla – mixing
- Sara Killion – mix assistant
- Al Schmitt – recording, orchestra recording
- Doug Epstein – recording
- Bill Schnee – orchestra recording, additional engineer
- Matt Still – vocal recording for Elton John (5)
- Jon Allen – additional engineer
- Darwin Best – additional engineer
- Darius Fong – additional engineer
- Dan Garcia – additional engineer
- Bobby Ginsburg – additional engineer
- Carter Humphrey – additional engineer
- Ryan Petrie – additional engineer

== Charts ==
=== Weekly charts ===
Chart (2005)	Peak position
Australian Albums (ARIA)	15
Belgian Albums (Ultratop Flanders)	30
Belgian Albums (Ultratop Wallonia)	78
Canadian Albums (Billboard)	2
Dutch Albums (Album Top 100)	33
German Albums (Offizielle Top 100)	59
Irish Albums (IRMA)	41
Italian Albums (FIMI)	60
New Zealand Albums (RMNZ)	20
Polish Albums (ZPAV)	5
Portuguese Albums (AFP)	13
Spanish Albums (Promusicae)	42
Swedish Albums (Sverigetopplistan)	5
UK Albums (Official Charts)	3
US Billboard 200	2

=== Year-end charts ===
Chart (2005)	Position
Australian Albums (ARIA)	99
Swedish Albums (Sverigetopplistan)	51
UK Albums (OCC)	60
US Billboard 200	167
Worldwide Albums (IFPI)	38

Chart (2006)	Position
US Billboard 200	116

== Certifications ==
Region	Certification	Certified units/sales
Australia (ARIA)	Gold	35,000^{^}
Ireland (IRMA)	Gold	7,500^{^}
Poland (ZPAV)	Gold	10,000^{*}
Sweden (GLF)	Gold	30,000^{^}
United Kingdom (BPI)	Platinum	300,000^{^}
United States (RIAA)	Platinum	1,000,000^{^}
^{*} Sales figures based on certification alone.^{^} Shipments figures based on certification alone.
