= Lazarus (musical) =

Musical composed by David Bowie

- Off-Broadway promotional poster
- Music: David Bowie
- Lyrics: David Bowie
- Book: Enda Walsh
- Basis: The Man Who Fell to Earth by Walter Tevis
- Productions: 2015 Off-Broadway; 2016 Off-West End; 2018 Hamburg; 2019 Melbourne; 2019 Amsterdam; 2019 Prague; 2019 São Paulo; 2019 Bielefeld; 2019 Oslo; 2020 Rio de Janeiro; 2020 Wrocław; 2020 Gießen / Hessen; 2022 Copenhagen; 2023 Stockholm; 2023/24 Kiel; 2024 Prague; 2026 Darmstadt; Director Ivo van Hove; Musical Director Henry Hey Arranger Henry Hey

Lazarus is a jukebox musical featuring the music of David Bowie with a book by Enda Walsh. Inspired by the 1963 novel The Man Who Fell To Earth by Walter Tevis, Lazarus continues the story of Thomas Newton, a humanoid alien who is stuck on Earth, unable to die or return to his home planet. Lazarus had its world premiere Off-Broadway at the New York Theatre Workshop on 18 November 2015 and played until 20 January 2016. The show then made the transfer to the West End at King's Cross Theatre in London, playing from 25 October 2016 to 22 January 2017.

== Plot ==
The musical continues the story in Walter Tevis' 1963 novel, The Man Who Fell To Earth, following Thomas Newton, a humanoid alien stuck on Earth. When a mysterious girl arrives, identifying herself as an apparition seeking peace, he must confront his regrets and the possibility of his return home. The musical takes place across several days in Newton's New York City apartment and is set to the music of David Bowie.

== Background ==
Lazarus was one of the last works Bowie completed before his death on January 10, 2016. Bowie's last public appearance was when he attended the 7 December 2015 opening night of the off-Broadway production. The New York City Mayor's office declared 20 January 2016 – closing night of the off-Broadway production – to be David Bowie Day; the proclamation was presented to managing director Jeremy Blocker at the curtain call of the final show.

== Productions ==
=== Off-Broadway (2015) ===
The musical was staged for a limited run at New York Theatre Workshop in Manhattan, directed by Ivo van Hove. Henry Hey, who previously played keyboards on Bowie's 2013 album The Next Day, served as musical director and arranger/orchestrator for the production and worked closely with Bowie during its development. Like Bowie's contemporary album Blackstar (with which it shares the song "Lazarus"), much of the production of the musical was kept secret until its first preview in November 2015. The musical opened on 7 December 2015 with a planned run through 17 January 2016, although the production was extended to 20 January 2016. Tickets to the entire run of the musical sold out within hours of being made available.

=== West End (2016) ===
A London production of the musical ran at the King's Cross Theatre from 8 November 2016 to 22 January 2017, with previews beginning the week of 25 October. Ivo van Hove again directed the London production, and Henry Hey was the musical director and arranger/orchestrator. The London production was produced by Robert Fox Ltd. and Jones/Tintoretto Entertainment.

==== Film ====
A performance in London was recorded for a Lazarus film; the film was shown in New York for one night in May, 2018, and was later livestreamed worldwide online in January, 2021 for the fifth anniversary of David Bowie's death.

=== International productions ===
==== Denmark ====
The first Danish production of Lazarus opened August 29, 2019 at Aarhus Teater in collaboration with the Royal Danish Theatre. The production was directed by Heinrich Christensen, who also translated the book into Danish, although all songs were sung in English. The production re-opened at the Royal Danish Playhouse, Copenhagen on January 21, 2022.

==== Prague ====
A Prague production premiered on 12 October 2019 at Divadlo Komedie.

==== Amsterdam ====
An Amsterdam production of the musical premiered on 13 October 2019 at the DeLaMar Theater. Henry Hey was again musical supervisor and arranger/orchestrator. Ivo van Hove, after having directed the runs in New York and London, once again directed.

== Cast and characters ==
	Off-Broadway (2015–2016)	West End (2016–2017)
Thomas Jerome Newton	Michael C. Hall	
Valentine	Michael Esper	
Girl, later Marley	Sophia Anne Caruso	
Elly	Cristin Milioti	Amy Lennox
Teenage Girl 1	Krystina Alabado	Maimuna Memon
Teenage Girl 2	Krista Pioppi	Gabrielle Brooks
Teenage Girl 3	Brynn Williams	Sydnie Christmas
Zach	Bobby Moreno	Richard Hansell
Ben	Nicholas Christopher	Jamie Muscato
Michael	Charlie Pollock	Tom Parsons
Maemi	Lynn Craig	Julie Yammanee

== Musical numbers ==
Lazarus features a number of songs from Bowie's back catalogue as well as four new tracks ("Lazarus", "No Plan", "Killing a Little Time", "When I Met You").

- "Lazarus" – Newton
- "It’s No Game (Part 1)" – Japanese Woman, Newton, Teenage Girls
- "This Is Not America" – Teenage Girls, Girl
- "The Man Who Sold the World" – Michael
- "No Plan" – Girl
- "Love Is Lost" – Valentine, Teenage Girls
- "Changes" – Elly, Teenage Girls
- "Where Are We Now?" – Newton
- "Absolute Beginners" – Newton, Elly, Valentine, Teenage Girls, Girl
- "Dirty Boys" – Valentine
- "Killing a Little Time" – Newton
- "Life on Mars?" – Girl
- "All the Young Dudes" – Ben, Teenage Girls, Maemi
- "Sound and Vision"
- "Always Crashing in the Same Car" – Elly
- "Valentine's Day" – Valentine
- "When I Met You" – Newton, Teenage Girl 1
- "'Heroes'" – Newton, Marley

== Original cast recording ==
The original cast album was scheduled to be recorded on 11 January 2016, the day following Bowie's death. The cast and musicians were informed of his death upon arriving at studio before recording.

On 21 October 2016, the original cast recording, Lazarus, was released. The album was produced by Henry Hey, who was the musical director and arranger/orchestrator of the original New York production and subsequent productions in London and Amsterdam. The album also features three previously unreleased songs from Bowie, including the titular track, among the last he recorded prior to his death.

== Reception ==
Lazarus met with a mixed critical reception; while some critics praised the concept and performances, others found it pretentious and difficult to follow.

Ben Brantley said in his review of the production in The New York Times that "Ice-bolts of ecstasy shoot like novas through the fabulous muddle and murk of Lazarus, the great-sounding, great-looking and mind numbing new musical built around songs by David Bowie." Rolling Stone called the musical a "tour de force" and "theater at its finest."

Among the negative reviews, Ann Trenemen of The Times called the play "pretentious rubbish" and "nonsense on stilts", while Dominic Cavendish of The Telegraph wrote that he was "disappointed" in Bowie's final project, and that "it’s hard to engage head or heart when there’s so much enigma".

== Awards and nominations ==
=== Original Off-Broadway production ===
Year	Award	Category	Nominee	Outcome
2016	Drama Desk Awards	Outstanding Actor in a Musical	Michael C. Hall	Nominated
2016	Drama Desk Awards	Outstanding Sound Design in a Musical	Brian Ronan	Nominated
2016	Drama Desk Awards	Outstanding Projection Design	Tal Yarden	Nominated
2016	Drama League Awards	Distinguished Performance	Michael C. Hall	Nominated
2016	Outer Critics Circle Awards	Outstanding New Off-Broadway Musical		Nominated
2016	Outer Critics Circle Awards	Outstanding Book of a Musical	Enda Walsh	Nominated
2016	Outer Critics Circle Awards	Outstanding Featured Actor in a Musical	Michael Esper	Nominated
2016	Outer Critics Circle Awards	Outstanding Featured Actress in a Musical	Sophia Anne Caruso	Nominated
2016	Outer Critics Circle Awards	Outstanding Projection Design	Tal Yarden	Nominated
2016	Lucille Lortel Awards	Outstanding Lead Actor in a Musical	Michael C. Hall	Nominated
2016	Lucille Lortel Awards	Outstanding Lead Actress in a Musical	Sophia Anne Caruso	Nominated

=== Original West End production ===
Year	Award ceremony	Category	Nominee	Result
2017	WhatsOnStage Awards	Best Actor in a Musical	Michael C. Hall	Nominated
2017	WhatsOnStage Awards	Best Supporting Actress in a Musical	Amy Lennox	Nominated
2017	WhatsOnStage Awards	Best Supporting Actress in a Musical	Sophia Anne Caruso	Nominated
2017	WhatsOnStage Awards	Best Video Design	Tal Yarden	Nominated
