= Sophia Anne Caruso =

American actress

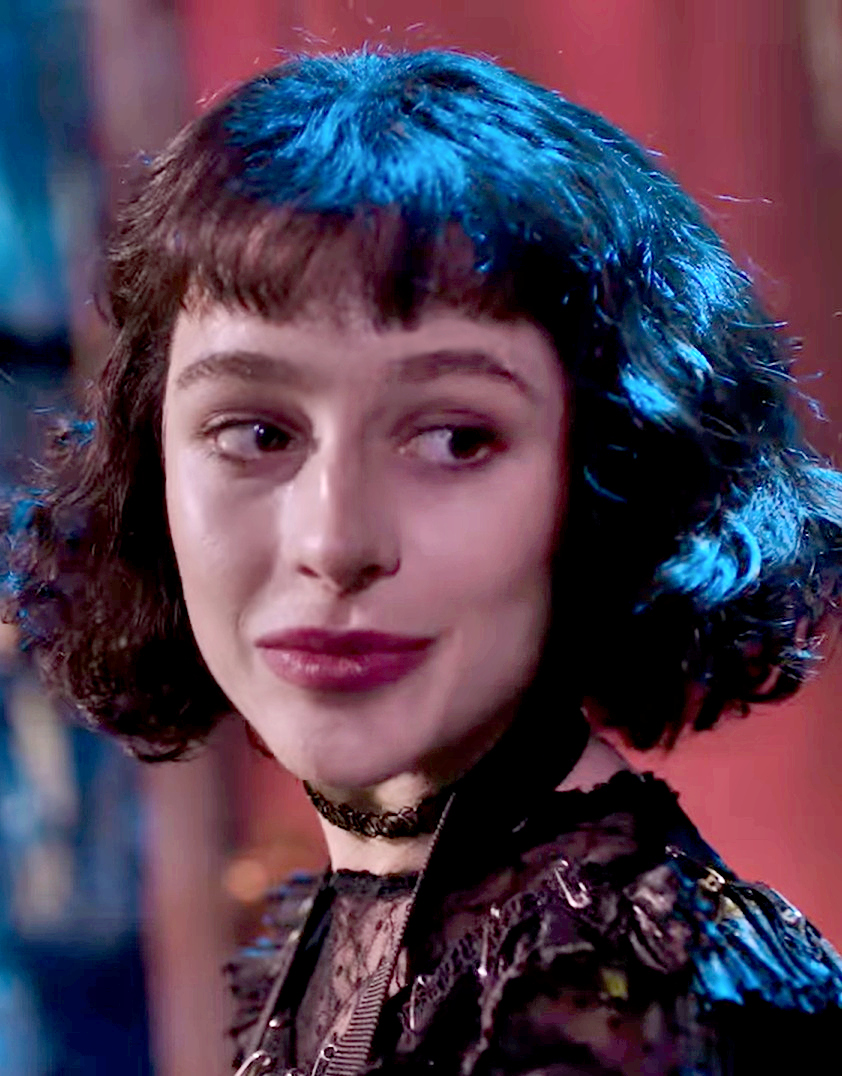
- Caruso in Beetlejuice 2019
- Born: July 11, 2001 (age 25); Spokane, Washington, United States
- Occupations: Actress; singer; dancer
- Years active: 2011–present

Sophia Anne Caruso (born July 11, 2001) is an American actress, singer, and dancer best known for originating the role of Lydia Deetz in the Broadway musical Beetlejuice, a role for which she won a Theatre World Award. She portrayed Sophie in the film The School for Good and Evil, in 2022. Other theatre credits include Girl in Lazarus (2015–2017), Iris in The Nether (2015), and Marlow in the Broadway production of the play Grey House in 2023. Caruso played Miss Goldenweek in season 2 of the Netflix adaptation of One Piece.

== Early life ==
Caruso was born on July 11, 2001 in Spokane, Washington, to Steve Caruso, a former “club pro” golf professional, and Deena Caruso, who owned several clothing and jewelry stores. She is the youngest of three children. Caruso was involved in the local Spokane Children's Theatre, starting at age 7, before transitioning to theatre at Spokane Civic Theatre and Interplayers Professional Theatre. Caruso made her professional debut in 2011 at age nine when she played Helen Keller in the Interplayers Professional Theatre production of The Miracle Worker in Spokane.

Caruso’s final role in Spokane was as Tina Denmark in Ruthless! The Musical at Interplayers in June 2012. However, it never opened because actor David Gigler collapsed on stage during rehearsal just days before opening and died.

In 2012, she and her family relocated to New York so that Caruso could pursue acting professionally.

== Career ==
=== Theatre ===
In 2014, Caruso was able to reprise her role as Tina Denmark in Ruthless! The Musical for a limited run at the Triad Theatre. The next month, she originated the role of Charlotte van Gotheem in Little Dancer at the Kennedy Center in Washington, D.C.

In 2015, Caruso appeared in the off-Broadway play The Nether at the MCC Theater, for which she received a Lucille Lortel nomination for Outstanding Featured Actress in a Play. Later that year, Caruso originated the role of "Girl" in David Bowie's musical Lazarus at New York Theatre Workshop in Manhattan.

She then made her Broadway debut as The Girl in Blackbird at the Belasco Theatre. Later that year, she appeared in the ensemble of the Encores! staged concert production of Runaways at New York City Center. In October 2016, she reprised her role as "Girl" in London in the King's Cross Theatre production of Lazarus for which she received a WhatsOnStage Award nomination for "Best Supporting Actress in a Musical".

In 2017, Caruso originated the role of Lydia Deetz in a workshop of the musical Beetlejuice, reprising the role in the musical's tryout at the National Theatre in Washington, D.C., before starring in the Broadway production beginning in March 2019. She won a Theatre World Award for the role. Caruso left the show abruptly on February 19, 2020, using her contractual out in order to pursue work in film and television.

In 2023, Caruso portrayed Marlow in the Broadway production of Grey House at the Lyceum Theatre.

=== Music ===
Caruso's debut single "Toys" was released on May 22, 2020. The song was produced by Henry Hey, who worked with Caruso as the musical director of Lazarus, and Nick Littlemore of Empire of the Sun. She planned to release an EP at the time, but no updates have come since the song's release. Caruso released the single "Goodbye" in February 2021. In July 2022, Caruso released another single, "Snow & Ice".

=== Film ===
Caruso was cast to star alongside Sofia Wylie as Sophie in the Netflix fantasy film The School for Good and Evil, an adaptation of the book series by Soman Chainani.

=== Television ===
In January 2025, was announced that Caruso was cast as Miss Goldenweek for the second season of the Netflix series One Piece, released in 2026, based on the manga of the same name by Eiichiro Oda.

== Filmography ==
=== Theatre ===
Year	Title	Role	Notes
2011	The Miracle Worker	Helen Keller	Interplayers Theatre, Spokane
2013	Secondhand Lions: A New Musical	Jane	5th Avenue Theatre, Seattle
2014	Little Dancer	Charlotte Van Goethem	Kennedy Center, Washington, D.C.
2014	Ruthless!	Tina Denmark	Triad Theatre, New York
2015	The Nether	Iris	MCC Theater, New York City
2015–16	Lazarus	Newton's Muse	New York Theatre Workshop
2016	Runaways	Ensemble	New York City Center
2016	Blackbird	The Girl	Belasco Theatre, Broadway
2016–17	Lazarus	Newton's Muse	King's Cross Theatre, London
2018	Beetlejuice	Lydia Deetz	National Theatre, Washington, D.C.
2019–2020	Beetlejuice	Lydia Deetz	Winter Garden Theatre, Broadway
2023	Grey House	Marlow	Lyceum Theatre, Broadway
2026	Memoirs of Amorous Gentlemen	Colette	Night Egg off-Broadway

=== Film ===
Year	Title	Role
2015	Jack of the Red Hearts	Bethany "Coke" Ferguson
2016	37	Lisa
2022	The School for Good and Evil	Sophie

=== Television ===
Year	Title	Role	Notes
2013	The Sound of Music Live!	Brigitta von Trapp	Television special
2013	Celebrity Ghost Stories	Young Jillian Barberie	Episode: "Jillian Barberie/Dan Cortese/Bruce Boxleitner"
2013	Smash	Young Norma Jean	Episode: "The Phenomenon"
2018	Strangers	Lily	Episode: "The Big (Gr)apple"
2019	Evil	Emma	Episode: "7 Swans a Singin"
2026	One Piece	Marianne / Miss Goldenweek	Episodes: "Big Trouble in Little Garden"; "Wax On, Wax Off"

== Discography ==
Singles

- "Toys" (2020)
- "Goodbye" (2021)
- "Snow & Ice" (2022)
- “Thing Like That” (2022)
- "Higher State" (2026)

Theatre albums

- Lazarus Original Cast Recording (2016)
- Beetlejuice Original Broadway Cast Recording (2019)
- The Liz Swados Project (2020)

== Awards and nominations ==
Year	Award	Category	Work	Result
2015	Lucille Lortel Award	Outstanding Featured Actress in a Play	The Nether	Nominated
2016	Lucille Lortel Award	Outstanding Lead Actress in a Musical	Lazarus	Nominated
2016	Outer Critics Circle Award	Outstanding Featured Performer in an Off-Broadway Musical	Lazarus	Nominated
2016	WhatsOnStage Award	Best Supporting Actress in a Musical	Lazarus	Nominated
2019	Theatre World Award	Outstanding New York City Stage Debut Performance	Beetlejuice	Won
2020	Clive Barnes Award	Theater Artist Award	Beetlejuice	Nominated
2024	Broadway.com Audience Award	Favorite Featured Actress in a Play	Grey House	Nominated
