= Jimmy Paxson =

American drummer

Jimmy Paxson is an American drummer who has toured, performed and/or recorded with Stevie Nicks, The Chicks, Keith Urban, Ben Harper, Charlie Musselwhite, Lady Blackbird, Lindsey Buckingham, Christine McVie, David Crosby, Beyoncé, Alanis Morissette, Idina Menzel, Ellen Harper, Ian Moore, Natalie Maines, Lloyd Maines, Billy Gibbons, Steve Miller, Eikichi Yazawa, Orianthi, Edgar Winter, Ronnie Montrose, Stanley Clarke, Rod Stewart, Joe Sample, Randy Crawford, Robben Ford, Philip Sayce, Waddy Wachtel, Keiko Matsui, Miss Velvet, Morgan Myles, Sophie B. Hawkins, Sub.bionic, Lady Antebellum, Don Henley, Steve Vai, Pata (X-Japan), The Immediate Family (Danny Kortchmar, Waddy Wachtel, Leland Sklar and Steve Postell), Sheryl Crow, Joseph Arthur, Roy Gaines, Rick Derringer, Ravi Coltraine, Jerry Goodman, Dave Stewart, Mike Campbell, Johnny Rivers, A Fine Frenzy, Anna Nalick, Adam Levine, Vanessa Carlton, Nancy Sinatra, Lili Haydn, Annie Clark (of St. Vincent), Larkin Poe, Ladies of the Canyon, Abandon Jalopy (with Brad Smith of Blind Melon), Philip Sayce, Shy Carter, Blondie Chaplin, Batture Boys with Tommy Malone and Ray Ganucheau, Andra Day, Sunnie Paxson, Cagnet, Barbara Morrison, Bernard Fowler, Julian Coryell, Rachael Spector, Keith Allison. Elizavetta, Ray-J. and Giorgia.

His organ trio "The Casualties of Jazz" (with bassist Chris Golden and Matt Rohde on B3 Hammond Organ) recorded a critically acclaimed record of Black Sabbath songs performed as organ jazz called Kind of Black (2004 Bel Aire Records, produced by J.J. Blair). He is the first son of Philadelphia Jazz musicians - Drummer Jimmy Paxson Sr. and Pianist Sunnie Paxson. His son Kiichi is a highly regarded Japanese Collegiate/Pro Volleyball player and his daughter Maya is a respected Artist / Illustrator / Drummer. Aside from drumming, Jimmy is an avid fisherman, inventor, chef, satirist and humanitarian who no matter where he lays his hat, still and forever will claim Ocean City N.J. as his home.
