= Henry Hey =

American musician

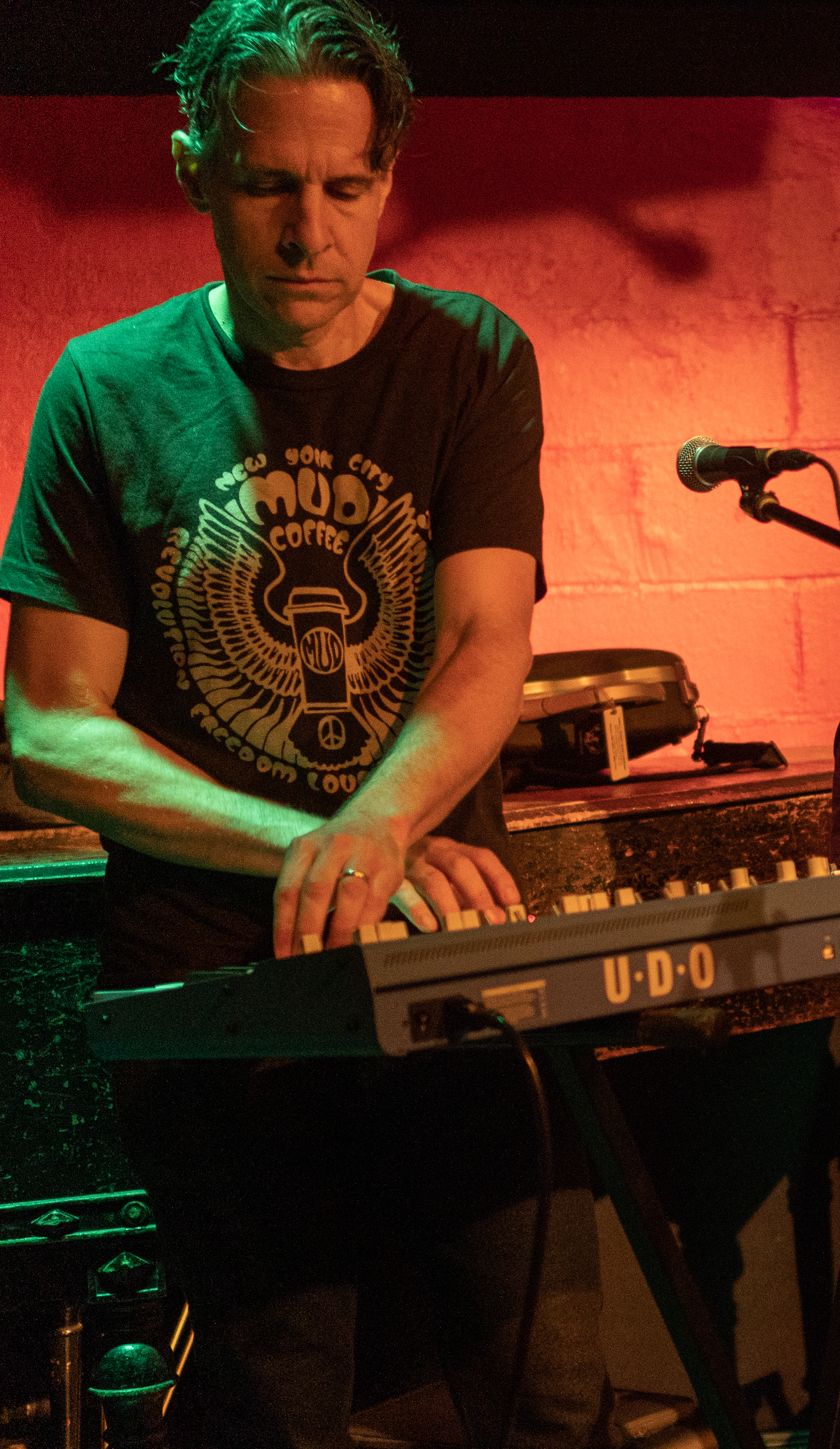
- Hey performing at Rockwood Music Hall - NYC 2022

Background information
- Genres: Jazz; Rock; Electronic
- Occupation(s): Musician, keyboardist, pianist, arranger, musical director, composer
- Instrument(s): Keyboards, piano
- Years active: 1994–present
- Labels: Columbia Records, Sony Music, GroundUP Music
- Member of: Forq
- Website: henryhey.com

Henry Hey is an American keyboardist, songwriter, producer, arranger and musical director. He has worked with artists such as David Bowie, Empire of the Sun, Rod Stewart, and George Michael. As a solo artist, he is the co-founder of the jazz fusion band Forq and a member of the band Rudder. Hey has been a producer for a number of artists including Lucy Woodward, Tony Kadleck, Shunzo Ohno, Lisa Lisa. Hey's playing can also be heard on several major motion pictures including Ocean's Twelve, The Secret Life of Walter Mitty, The Hundred-Foot Journey.

== Career ==
=== Solo career ===
Hey's debut recording as a bandleader was the Henry Hey Trio album Watershed, which was released in 2003. In addition to Hey on piano, the album included drummer Jochen Rückert and bassist John Hebert.

Hey later formed the jazz fusion band Rudder with drummer Keith Carlock, bassist Tim Lefebvre, and saxophonist Chris Cheek. The quartet released their self-titled debut album Rudder in 2007 and their follow-up album Matorning in 2009, which was met with some acclaim. Their last release was a live concert DVD in 2011 titled "Live Rockwood Music Hall NYC".

One of Hey's current projects is the jazz fusion band Forq, which he co-founded with Snarky Puppy bassist Michael League. The group has released three albums under League's label GroundUP Music, Forq in 2014, Batch in 2015, and Threq in 2017.

=== Collaborations ===
==== Rod Stewart ====
Hey first began working with British singer Rod Stewart as part of the singer's Great American Songbook series. After joining Stewart for a few TV performances, Hey played piano on the second album of the series As Time Goes By: The Great American Songbook 2, which was released in 2003. Hey then joined Stewart's band as the musical director and pianist for the Great American Songbook tour and later appeared on Stewart's 2009 album Soulbook.

==== George Michael ====
From 2011 to 2012, Hey served as the musical director and pianist for British singer-songwriter George Michael during his international orchestral Symphonica Tour. Michael's performance from this tour at the Royal Albert Hall in London, England was later released as the live album Symphonica, which included Hey along with producer Phil Ramone. Symphonica was the last album by both Ramone and Michael, who died in 2013 and 2016, respectively.

==== David Bowie ====
Hey was asked to play keyboards on British musician David Bowie's 2013 comeback album The Next Day by producer Tony Visconti. The album was later nominated in the 56th Annual Grammy Awards for the "Best Rock Album" category.

In 2014, Bowie asked Hey to serve as musical director, arranger, and keyboardist for the production of Bowie's new musical Lazarus, which included actor Michael C. Hall in the lead role. During this time, Bowie was also secretly receiving cancer treatment and working on his new album Blackstar, whose band included Hey's Rudder bandmate and bassist Tim Lefebvre. Hey assembled the seven-member house band for Lazarus, which included Hey's Forq bandmate and guitarist Chris McQueen, guitarist JJ Appleton, and drummer Brian Delaney of the New York Dolls.

The musical had a sold-out opening run in New York City as an off-Broadway production at the New York Theatre Workshop from December 2015 to January 2016. Bowie died during this production on January 10, 2016, the night before the Lazarus cast recording of the musical's soundtrack. Hey produced and performed keyboards on the cast recording, which was later released in October of that year. Lazarus was again performed in London, England, from November 2016 to January 2017. A film of the London production was screened in Brooklyn, NY at the Kings Theatre on May 2, 2017, with a live band accompaniment led by Hey as well. In December 2018, it was announced that Lazarus will premiere in Amsterdam, Netherlands at DeLaMar in October 2019.

==== Empire of the Sun ====
Hey has co-written songs with Australian electronic music duo Empire of the Sun on their 2013 album Ice on the Dune and their 2016 album Two Vines. Empire of the Sun member Nick Littlemore also released the album Every River Tells a Tale with Hey and bassist Tim Lefebvre in 2018 as part of The 2 Leaves Project.

==== Lucy Woodward ====
Hey began working with singer-songwriter Lucy Woodward as the pianist on her 2010 album Hooked!, which also included producer Tony Visconti. Hey went on to co-write with Woodward and co-produce her 2016 album 'Til They Bang on the Door with Forq bandmate Michael League. The album was also released on League's music label GroundUP Music.

==== Other Notable Projects ====
In 2012, Hey worked as an arranger with collaborator Nick Littlemore for pop singer MIKA on his album The Origin of Love. Hey and Littlemore did arranging together again for pop singer Ariana Grande on her debut album Yours Truly, which also featured a collaboration with MIKA for his song "Popular Song".

Hey also played piano on progressive rock drummer Bill Bruford & multi-instrumentalist Tim Garland's album Earthworks Underground Orchestra that was released in 2006. Around this time, Hey also played on Steely Dan guitarist Walter Becker's second and final solo album Circus Money. Hey appeared on jazz fusion guitarist Wayne Krantz's album "Howie 61" and jazz vocalist Theo Bleckmann's album Hello Earth! The Music of Kate Bush as well.

Recently, Hey wrote string arrangements on blues rock group Tedeschi Trucks Band's album Let Me Get By. Hey also played in Broadway singer and actress Vanessa Williams' touring band.

=== Films ===
Hey has also been involved in the soundtracks for numerous films. He was the keyboardist in the soundtrack for The Last Mimzy, which also included former Pink Floyd bassist Roger Waters. He also wrote songs for Dumb and Dumber To and Harold & Kumar Go To White Castle and can be heard in other films including Ocean's Twelve, Ocean's 8, Zoolander 2, and The Hundred-Foot Journey.

== Awards and honors ==
2014: The Next Day by David Bowie featuring Hey on keyboards was nominated in the 56th Annual Grammy Awards for "Best Rock Album".

== Selected Recordings ==
=== Solo career ===
- The 2 Leaves Project (Nick Littlemore & Henry Hey): Every River Tells a Tale (2017)
- Forq: Threq (2017)
- Forq: Batch (2015)
- Forq: Forq (2014)
- Rudder: Matorning (2009)
- Rudder: Rudder (2007)

=== As Arranger/Writer/Session Artist ===
- David Bowie: Lazarus (2016)
- Empire of the Sun: Two Vines (2016)
- Lucy Woodward: 'Til They Bang on the Door (2016)
- Tedeschi Trucks Band: Let Me Get By (2016)
- George Michael: Symphonica (2014)
- David Bowie: The Next Day (2013)
- Empire of the Sun: Ice on the Dune (2013)
- Ariana Grande: Yours Truly (2013)
- MIKA: The Origin of Love (2012)
- Wayne Krantz: Howie 61 (2012)
- Theo Bleckmann: Hello Earth! The Music of Kate Bush (2012)
- Lucy Woodward: Hooked! (2010)
- Rod Stewart: Soulbook (2009)
- Walter Becker: Circus Money (2008)
- Bill Bruford & Tim Garland: Earthworks Underground Orchestra (2006)
- Rod Stewart: As Time Goes By: The Great American Songbook 2 (2003)

=== Film Soundtracks ===
- Ocean's 8 (2018)
- Zoolander 2 (2016)
- The Hundred-Foot Journey (2014)
- Dumb and Dumber To (2014)
- The Last Mimzy (2007)
- Harold & Kumar Go To White Castle (2004)
- Ocean's Twelve (2004)
