= Lisa Hilton (musician) =

American jazz pianist, bandleader, and composer

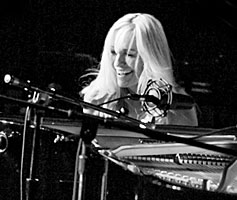
- Hilton at the Catalina Jazz Club in Hollywood; Photo: Ron Hall

Background information
- Born: San Luis Obispo, California, U.S.
- Genre: Jazz
- Occupations: Musician, composer, record producer, band leader
- Instrument: Piano
- Years active: 1997–present
- Labels: Ruby Slippers Productions, EvoSound
- Website: lisahiltonmusic.com

Lisa Kristine Hilton is an American jazz pianist, bandleader, producer, and composer based in Southern California. Her compositions blend jazz and blues with classical, and avant-garde music. Since the early 2000s she has recorded with Antonio Sánchez, Larry Grenadier, Christian McBride, Luques Curtis, J. D. Allen, Rudy Royston, Igmar Thomas, and Sean Jones.

== Early years ==
Hilton was born in San Luis Obispo, a small town on California's central coast. Her father was a college professor and her mother was an accountant. At approximately the age of six, she began playing piano, first teaching herself to play with a colored keyboard guide and composing simple songs. Later she was inspired by stories of her great-uncle, Dutch pianist Willem Bloemendaal. Although her early years were dominated by classical music and 20th-century music study, in her teens she became interested in jazz and blues. Seeing the blues duo Sonny Terry and Brownie McGhee in concert had a lasting impact, as did the music of Jelly Roll Morton, Robert Johnson, and Muddy Waters. She played piano for her grammar school glee club starting in third grade, later joining orchestra and band on flute, and performed piano scores for high school musicals.

Hilton moved to San Francisco as a college student to study piano with Carlo Bussotti. But later changed her major to complete a degree in art and design.

== Return to the piano ==
In 1997, Hilton's interest in music was reignited by a neighbor, pianist David Foster. She resumed her studies in theory and composition with composer Charles Bernstein at UCLA. Her first album, Seduction (1997), was just solo piano which Hilton also produced. Since then she has produced and recorded about one album a year. Hilton's albums primarily feature her own compositions, but also include cover songs by musicians such as Dizzy Gillespie, Miles Davis, and Bill Evans. Hilton has stated she also tries to record arrangements of music by women composers as Billie Eilish, Janis Joplin, Joni Mitchell, Lana Del Rey, and Taylor Swift, and Ann Ronell.

Hilton began working in 2005 with the multi-Grammy Award-winning engineer Al Schmitt and they continued working together until his passing in 2021. Hilton has also worked with renowned engineers Doug Sax, Gavin Lurssen, Fernando Lodeiro, Larry Mah, James Farber, Chandler Harrod, Eric Boulanger, and Jay Newland, recording 300 tracks of original compositions as well as jazz covers. Hilton has been a member of Berklee College of Music’s Presidential Advisory Council since 2010 and a voting member of the Producers and Engineers Wing of The Recording Academy since 2003.

== Compositions ==
Hilton has received acclaim for her compositions. She cites Thelonious Monk, Duke Ellington, Miles Davis, and Horace Silver as her most important compositional influences. Hilton uses improvisation, free jazz, and shifting modal key centers for impressionistic compositions like "When it Rains." She use ideas from other art forms. "French composers like Debussy used harmonic 'impressionism,' but I like to use improvisational ideas in an impressionistic way," she told Phil Freeman of Burning Ambulance. "Seurat's pointillism technique is something I have applied to music, for example." "Music feels like my first language," she added. "It feels like I can create an experience compositionally that allows others to also feel that experience, much like a good writer being able to describe love, or a painter or photographer creating an image. I think I can compose and play the sound of twilight, of a warm summer's day, of love or grief, of a subway or dolphins even. I think of my – and our – music as abstract or non-figurative paintings." Hilton ventures into longer musical forms, fusing jazz onto classical forms, as in "Midnight Sonata" from her album Nocturnal. On Escapism her arrangements paired modern jazz modalities and classical techniques with a "lofty sophistication reminiscent of classic piano music from Beethoven, Chopin, or Stravinsky."

== Later life and career ==
As a bandleader, Hilton has worked with bassists Christian McBride, Luques Curtis, and Larry Grenadier, drummers Antonio Sanchez, Nasheet Waits, Rudy Royston, Billy Hart, and Lewis Nash, trumpeters Ingmar Thomas, Sean Jones and Terell Stafford, and saxophonists J. D. Allen, Steve Wilson, Brice Winston, and Bobby Militello. On her latest album, Naturally, Hilton’s line-up included long-time bandmates Rudy Royston on drums, Luques Curtis on bass, trumpeter Igmar Thomas, and J. D. Allen on tenor sax. In the book The New Face of Jazz, author Cicily Janus writes that Hilton has been "compared to some of the best pianists in history" – comparisons often include Bill Evans and Dave Brubeck, but Hilton's compositions are also considered to be reminiscent of musical impressionism inspired by Claude Debussy and Erik Satie.

In 2026, Hilton won two World Entertainment Awards: Best Jazz Album for Lucky All Along and Best Jazz Solo Performance for the track "Hollywood Moment."

In All About Jazz, Hilton's album Lucky All Along was voted one of the Best Recordings of 2024 by Neil Duggan and, in 2021, her album Transparent Sky was included in a year's end roundup of the Best Recordings by Mike Jurkovick. Hilton’s 2025 album Extended Daydream was included in The Times of London's collection of best jazz albums of 2025.

In 1988, Price Stern Sloan published the children's book, If Dinosaurs Were Alive Today, which Hilton wrote with her sister, Sandra L. Kirkpatrick, and illustrated by Randy Chewning.

== Publishing ==
Inspired by Joni Mitchell, Hilton started a publishing company that was trademarked Lisa Hilton Music. Her record label, Ruby Slippers Productions was established in 2001. She is a voting member of the National Music Publishers Association.

== Inspiration ==
For over twenty years, Hilton has lived in Malibu, California. She has often said that the mountains, waterfalls, and beaches inspire her compositions, such as "The Sky and the Ocean" from Horizons. The daughter of a biology professor, she values nature and brings it into her compositions, as in the titles "Vapors & Shadows" from Oasis, "Mojave Moon" from Escapism, and "Sunset on the Beach" from Day and Night.

== Philanthropy ==
Hilton supports music programs for children and teens, particularly the blind or visually impaired. She has performed benefit concerts, conducted workshops, and played with young musicians at Perkins School for the Blind, Chicago Lighthouse Junior Blind of America and the Assistive Music Technology Lab at Berklee College of Music in Boston.

== Discography ==
As a leader

- Seduction (Ruby Slippers Productions, 1997)
- Playing by Heart (Ruby Slippers Productions, 1999)
- Cocktails at Eight... (Ruby Slippers Productions, 2000)
- Feeling Good (Ruby Slippers Productions, 2001)
- In the Mood for Jazz (Ruby Slippers Productions, 2003)
- Jazz After Hours (Ruby Slippers Productions, 2004)
- My Favorite Things (Ruby Slippers Productions, 2005)
- Midnight in Manhattan (Ruby Slippers Productions, 2006)
- After Dark (EvoSound, 2007)
- The New York Sessions (Ruby Slippers Productions, 2007)
- So This Is Love (EvoSound, 2008)
- Sunny Day Theory (Ruby Slippers Productions, 2008)
- Twilight & Blues (Ruby Slippers Productions, 2009)
- Nuance (Ruby Slippers Productions, 2010)
- Underground (Ruby Slippers Productions, 2011)
- American Impressions (Ruby Slippers Productions, 2012)
- Getaway (Ruby Slippers Productions, 2013)
- Kaleidoscope (Ruby Slippers Productions, 2014)
- Horizons (Ruby Slippers Productions, 2015)
- Nocturnal (Ruby Slippers Productions, 2016)
- Day & Night (Ruby Slippers Productions, 2016)
- Escapism (Ruby Slippers Productions, 2017)
- Oasis (Ruby Slippers Productions, 2018)
- Chalkboard Destiny (Ruby Slippers Productions, 2019)
- More Than Another Day (Ruby Slippers Productions, 2020)
- Transparent Sky (Ruby Slippers Productions, 2021)
- life is beautiful (Ruby Slippers Productions, 2022)
- Paradise Cove (Ruby Slippers Productions, 2022)
- Coincidental Moment (Ruby Slippers Productions, 2023)
- Lucky All Along (Ruby Slippers Productions, 2024)
- Extended Daydream (Ruby Slippers Productions, 2025)
- Naturally (Ruby Slippers Productions, 2026)

Compilations

- Oriented (New Age Music and New Sounds / Italy, 2007)
- So Jazz! la nouvelle vague volume 2 (Consort SA So Jazz / Switzerland, 2011)
- Jazz Bar 2014 (Terasima Records, Japan, 2014)
- Jazz Bar Analog Best Selection Volume 3 (Terasima Records/Japan, vinyl, 2018)
- For Jazz Ballad Fans Only Volume 2 (Terasima Records/Japan, vinyl, 2021)
- Jazz Bar 2021 (Terasima Records, Japan, 2021)
- For Jazz Ballad Fans Only Vol. 4 (Terasima Records/Japan, 2023)

== Personal ==
Hilton resides in Malibu, California with her husband Steven M. Hilton — a philanthropist and former skateboarding champion — where they raised their two children.
