= Arnold Stiefel =

American talent manager

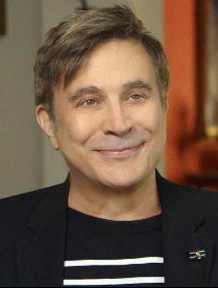
- Stiefel in 2013
- Born: Philadelphia, Pennsylvania, U.S.
- Occupations: Talent manager, film producer, television producer, entrepreneur

Arnold Stiefel, chairman and CEO of Stiefel Entertainment, is an American talent manager, film and television producer, and entrepreneur. Over the course of his career, Stiefel has worked with Bette Midler, Prince, and Toni Braxton. He is best known for his association with Rod Stewart, whom he has managed since 1983.

== Career ==
Stiefel was born in Philadelphia. There, his father, Alex Stiefel, owned the renowned Uptown Theater, the "crown jewel of the Philadelphia black entertainment scene." Stiefel developed an early interest in entertainment through exposure to classic films and to iconic rhythm and blues artists such as The Supremes, Fats Domino, Etta James, Ray Charles, and Stevie Wonder.

At 18, Stiefel moved from Philadelphia to New York City, where he joined Bantam Books in an entry-level position. He rose up the ranks, working with Jacqueline Susann, Gore Vidal, and Tom Wolfe, and when he left Bantam, at 22, he was one of book publishing's youngest directors. After he was recruited by Paul Kohner, Stiefel moved from New York to Los Angeles, where he joined the Paul Kohner Agency as a literary agent. After a year, he left Kohner to found his own company, The Stiefel Office.

His first client was the then-unknown screenwriter Bo Goldman. Shortly after signing with Stiefel, Goldman wrote the script for One Flew Over the Cuckoo's Nest, which won the Academy Award for Best Adapted Screenplay in 1975. Stiefel broadened his roster to include actors and musicians, signing Bette Midler, Natalie Wood, Robert Wagner, and Jeff Goldblum, among others. In 1978, he paired his clients Goldman and Midler for The Rose, which was nominated for four Academy Awards and won three Golden Globes. Subsequently, The Stiefel Office was acquired by ICM; after 19 months Stiefel and his clients defected to the William Morris Agency, creating front-page headlines in Hollywood trade magazines. During his two years at William Morris, Stiefel worked with Cher, Val Kilmer, Jonathan Demme, and Matthew Broderick.

In September 1983, Stiefel left William Morris to start his own management and production company, Stiefel Entertainment. He began managing Rod Stewart immediately thereafter, working to restore Stewart's credibility as a rock artist, which had suffered since the release of Stewart's disco-inflected 1978 hit, "Da Ya Think I'm Sexy?"

By 1988, Stewart had achieved an unprecedented level of success. A US tour, originally scheduled for four months, was extended to 13, grossing $50 million, and Stewart's 1988 album, Out of Order, sold more than 2 million copies in North America within months of its release. In 1994, Stewart staged a concert at Copacabana Beach in Rio de Janeiro, drawing an audience of 4.2 million people and setting a record for the largest live concert in history. To date, Stewart has sold more than 150 million albums, including the Grammy winning Great American Songbook records. Released between 2002 and 2010, the Songbook collection of five albums is the best selling series of all time.

In 1984, Stiefel expanded the management roster of Stiefel Entertainment to include Prince, The Bangles, Gene Loves Jezebel, Morrissey, Toni Braxton, and Guns N' Roses. In 1992, Stiefel co-founded Gasoline Alley Records, a joint venture with MCA, most notably releasing Sublime's multi-platinum eponymous debut.

As a motion picture producer, Stiefel's credits include the Warner Bros. film Midnight in the Garden of Good and Evil, directed by Clint Eastwood, the film rights for which Stiefel acquired prior to the book's publication. Additionally, he was a producer on Jonathan Demme's Talking Heads concert film, Stop Making Sense, and also produced Prince's Razzie award-winning Graffiti Bridge. Stiefel served as the executive producer on About Last Night..., the film adaptation of David Mamet's award-winning play, Sexual Perversity in Chicago, and has produced several television specials for Rod Stewart. He also produced Tonight's the Night, a 2003 musical based on Stewart's greatest hits, which ran for a year in London's West End. A new production of Tonight's the Night toured the UK beginning in January 2014.

In 2002, Stiefel partnered with rock promoter Andrew Hewitt to reinvent Il Sole, a restaurant on the Sunset Strip in Los Angeles. With a clientele that included celebrities and industry heavyweights, Il Sole became a "power restaurant", and retained its status until Stiefel and Hewitt sold it in 2011.
