= The Tears of Hercules =

Studio album by Rod Stewart
- Released: 12 November 2021
- Genres: Pop; Rock
- Length: 44:31
- Labels: Warner; Rhino
- Producers: Rod Stewart; Kevin Savigar

Rod Stewart chronology
You're in My Heart: Rod Stewart with the Royal Philharmonic Orchestra (2019)	The Tears of Hercules (2021)	Swing Fever (2024)

Singles from The Tears of Hercules
- 1. "One More Time" Released: 16 September 2021; 2. "Hold On" Released: 15 October 2021; 3. "I Can't Imagine" Released: 5 November 2021

The Tears of Hercules is the thirty-second studio album by British singer-songwriter Rod Stewart. It was released on 12 November 2021 through Warner and Rhino. It was produced by Stewart and Kevin Savigar.

== Background ==
Stewart began a songwriting and production partnership with Kevin Savigar in the early 2010s, and they experienced widespread commercial success with Time (2013), Another Country (2015) and Blood Red Roses (2018). Stewart then released a series of compilation albums, including You're in My Heart, Cupid and a box set of material recorded between 1975 and 1978.

== Music and lyrics ==
Stewart co-wrote nine of the album's tracks with Kevin Savigar and Emerson Swinford. "I Can't Imagine" is dedicated to Stewart's wife Penny Lancaster. "Hold On" addresses topical issues including bigotry and racism, with a reference to civil rights activist John Lewis. "Born to Boogie" is dedicated to Marc Bolan.

The title track was written by Canadian singer-songwriter Marc Jordan and composer Stephan Moccio, and originally released on Jordan's album Make Believe Ballroom (2004). Jordan had previously co-written "Rhythm of My Heart" with John Capek, a major hit for Stewart in 1991. The album also includes covers of "Some Kind of Wonderful" and the Johnny Cash song "These Are My People".

== Release and promotion ==
The Tears of Hercules was released on 12 November 2021. "One More Time" was released as the lead single on 16 September 2021 with an accompanying music video filmed in London on 21 August 2021. "Hold On" was released as the second single on 15 October 2021. "I Can't Imagine" followed as the third single on 5 November 2021, with an accompanying music video.

On the day of release, Stewart promoted the album on television shows including The Kelly Clarkson Show, The Late Show with Stephen Colbert and The Graham Norton Show.

=== Artwork ===
The photograph used for the cover artwork of The Tears of Hercules was taken by Penny Lancaster during the video shoot for "One More Time". It depicts Stewart wearing an embroidered military-style jacket and a necklace that reads "Celtic", in support of Celtic Football Club.

== Critical reception ==
Professional ratings
Aggregate scores
Source	Rating
Metacritic	57/100
Review scores
Source	Rating
AllMusic	3/5 stars
American Songwriter	2.5/5 stars
Classic Rock	4/5 stars
The Independent	1/5 stars

The Tears of Hercules was met with mixed reviews from music critics. On Metacritic, which assigns a normalised score out of 100 to ratings from publications, the album received a weighted mean score of 57 based on 5 reviews, indicating "mixed or average reviews".

Referencing Stewart's songwriting, AllMusic's Stephen Thomas Erlewine wrote that Stewart is "in a decidedly looser frame of mind" than he was on Time (2013). He described the album as "alternately baffling, absurd, sweet, and endearing". Writing for Classic Rock magazine, Paul Moody stated that Stewart has "always been a master interpreter of other people’s material", describing the title track as an "atmospheric ballad". In American Songwriter, Hal Horowitz was critical of the album's songwriting and production, but stated that "a few moments almost save this from moving into the “better luck next time” pile." In a wholly negative review for The Independent, Roisin O'Connor described the album as a "12-track cringefest" where "Stewart celebrates carnal love in between songs about his late father".

== Track listing ==
The Tears of Hercules track listing
No.	Title	Writer(s)	Length
1.	"One More Time"	Rod Stewart; Kevin Savigar	3:58
2.	"Gabriella"	Stewart; Savigar	3:33
3.	"All My Days"	Stewart; Savigar	3:37
4.	"Some Kind of Wonderful"	John Ellison	3:02
5.	"Born to Boogie (A Tribute to Marc Bolan)"	Stewart; Emerson Swinford	3:43
6.	"Kookooaramabama"	Stewart; Savigar	3:43
7.	"I Can't Imagine"	Stewart; Savigar; Swinford	3:35
8.	"The Tears of Hercules"	Marc Jordan; Stephan Moccio	4:10
9.	"Hold On"	Stewart; Savigar	4:19
10.	"Precious Memories"	Stewart; Savigar	3:59
11.	"These Are My People"	Johnny Cash	2:57
12.	"Touchline"	Stewart; Savigar	3:55
Total length:			44:31

Japanese edition bonus track
No.	Title	Length
13.	"Up All Night"	3:34
Total length:		48:05

== Personnel ==
Credits adapted from the album's liner notes.

=== Musicians ===
- Rod Stewart – vocals
- Kevin Savigar – keyboards, programming
- Emerson Swinford – guitars (2, 4–7, 9, 11), bass (5–6)
- Michael Severs – guitars (10)
- J'Anna Jacoby – violin (1), fiddles (3)
- Jimmy Roberts – saxophone (10)
- David Palmer – drums (5)
- Julia Thornton – percussion (3–5, 8–9, 11, 12)
- Amanda Miller – backing vocals (1–6, 8–10, 12)
- Holly Brewer – backing vocals (1–10, 12)
- Gemma Mewse – backing vocals (1–10)
- Harlano Weekes – backing vocals (4, 8–11)
- Adeola Shyllon – backing vocals (4, 8, 9, 11)
- Mark Agyei – backing vocals (4, 8–11)
- Melissa Veszi – backing vocals (4, 8, 9, 11)
- Sabrina Adel – backing vocals (4, 8, 9, 11)
- Taya Plant – backing vocals (4, 8, 9, 11)
- Roo Savill – backing vocals (7, 8, 12)
- Jessica Childress – backing vocals (9)
- T Jay Weekes – backing vocals (10)

=== Production ===
- Rod Stewart – producer, sleeve notes
- Kevin Savigar – producer, recording, mixing
- Joe Bozzi – mastering at Bernie Grundman Mastering (Hollywood, California)
- Sheryl Farber – project assistance
- Lisa Glines – project assistance
- Patrick Milligan – project assistance
- Susanne Savage – project assistance
- Penny Lancaster – photography
- Rory Wilson – art direction, design
- Kristin Attaway – packaging manager
- Julie Eldridge – product management, marketing
- Liuba Shapiro Ruiz – product management, marketing
- Helen Owens – global marketing

== Charts ==
=== Weekly charts ===
Weekly chart performance for The Tears of Hercules
Chart (2021)	Peak position
Australian Albums (ARIA)	39
Austrian Albums (Ö3 Austria)	23
Belgian Albums (Ultratop Flanders)	52
Belgian Albums (Ultratop Wallonia)	70
Dutch Albums (Album Top 100)	81
German Albums (Offizielle Top 100)	17
Hungarian Albums (MAHASZ)	4
Irish Albums (Official Charts)	11
Polish Albums (ZPAV)	43
Portuguese Albums (AFP)	46
Scottish Albums (Official Charts)	4
Spanish Albums (Promusicae)	48
Swedish Albums (Sverigetopplistan)	46
Swiss Albums (Schweizer Hitparade)	27
UK Albums (Official Charts)	5

=== Year-end charts ===
Year-end chart performance for The Tears of Hercules
Chart (2021)	Position
Hungarian Albums (MAHASZ)	60
UK Albums (OCC)	97

== Certifications ==
Region	Certification	Certified units/sales
United Kingdom (BPI)	Silver	60,000^{‡}
^{‡} Sales+streaming figures based on certification alone.
