= List of artists with the most UK Albums Chart number ones =

The UK Albums Chart is a weekly record chart compiled by Official Charts, which for most of its history was based on album sales from Sunday to Saturday in the United Kingdom. The chart was founded in 1956, compiling physical format album sales until 2007, after which it has included albums sold digitally. Since March 2015, it has incorporated music streaming service data. From 10 July 2015, it has been based on a Friday to Thursday album sales.

This list shows the seventeen artists with the most number ones on the UK Albums Chart. English singer-songwriter Robbie Williams has the most number one albums with sixteen. American musician Bruce Springsteen is the first male solo artist and Australian singer-songwriter Kylie Minogue is the first female solo artist to score a number one album in five consecutive decades.

== Tally ==
Artists with the most number one albums in the UK Albums Chart
Artist	Number one albums	Number one album	Record label(s)	First reached number one	Ref.
Robbie Williams	16	Life thru a Lens	Chrysalis	12 April 1998	
Robbie Williams	16	I've Been Expecting You	Chrysalis	1 November 1998	
Robbie Williams	16	Sing When You're Winning	Chrysalis	3 September 2000	
Robbie Williams	16	Swing When You're Winning	Chrysalis	25 November 2001	
Robbie Williams	16	Escapology	EMI	24 November 2002	
Robbie Williams	16	Greatest Hits	Chrysalis	24 October 2004	
Robbie Williams	16	Intensive Care	Chrysalis	30 October 2005	
Robbie Williams	16	Rudebox	Chrysalis	29 October 2006	
Robbie Williams	16	In and Out of Consciousness: Greatest Hits 1990–2010	Virgin	17 October 2010	
Robbie Williams	16	Take the Crown	Island	11 November 2012	
Robbie Williams	16	Swings Both Ways	Island	24 November 2013	
Robbie Williams	16	The Heavy Entertainment Show	Columbia	11 November 2016	
Robbie Williams	16	The Christmas Present	Columbia	6 December 2019	
Robbie Williams	16	XXV	Columbia	9 September 2022	
Robbie Williams	16	Better Man (Original Motion Picture Soundtrack)	Columbia	24 January 2025	
Robbie Williams	16	Britpop	Columbia	23 January 2026	
The Beatles	15	Please Please Me	Parlophone	5 May 1963	
The Beatles	15	With the Beatles	Parlophone	1 December 1963	
The Beatles	15	A Hard Day's Night	Parlophone	19 July 1964	
The Beatles	15	Beatles for Sale	Parlophone	13 December 1964	
The Beatles	15	Help!	Parlophone	8 August 1965	
The Beatles	15	Rubber Soul	Parlophone	19 December 1965	
The Beatles	15	Revolver	Parlophone	7 August 1966	
The Beatles	15	Sgt. Pepper's Lonely Hearts Club Band	Parlophone	4 June 1967	
The Beatles	15	The Beatles	Apple	1 December 1968	
The Beatles	15	Abbey Road	Apple	28 September 1969	
The Beatles	15	Let It Be	Apple	17 May 1970	
The Beatles	15	The Beatles at the Hollywood Bowl	Parlophone	12 June 1977	
The Beatles	15	Live at the BBC	Apple	4 December 1994	
The Beatles	15	Anthology 2	Apple	24 March 1996	
The Beatles	15	1	Apple	19 November 2000	
The Rolling Stones	15	The Rolling Stones	Decca	26 April 1964	
The Rolling Stones	15	The Rolling Stones No. 2	Decca	31 January 1965	
The Rolling Stones	15	Aftermath	Decca	24 April 1966	
The Rolling Stones	15	Let It Bleed	Decca	14 December 1969	
The Rolling Stones	15	Get Yer Ya-Ya's Out!	Decca	13 September 1970	
The Rolling Stones	15	Sticky Fingers	Rolling Stones	13 June 1971	
The Rolling Stones	15	Exile on Main St.	Rolling Stones	4 June 1972	
The Rolling Stones	15	Goats Head Soup	Rolling Stones	16 September 1973	
The Rolling Stones	15	Emotional Rescue	Rolling Stones	29 June 1980	
The Rolling Stones	15	Voodoo Lounge	Virgin	17 July 1994	
The Rolling Stones	15	Exile on Main St. (Note: Re-issue.)	Polydor	29 May 2010	
The Rolling Stones	15	Blue & Lonesome	Polydor	9 December 2016	
The Rolling Stones	15	Goats Head Soup (Note: Re-issue.)	Polydor	17 September 2020	
The Rolling Stones	15	Hackney Diamonds	Polydor	27 October 2023	
The Rolling Stones	15	Foreign Tongues	Polydor	17 July 2026	
Taylor Swift	14	Red	Mercury	3 November 2012	
Taylor Swift	14	1989	EMI	8 November 2014	
Taylor Swift	14	Reputation	EMI	23 November 2017	
Taylor Swift	14	Lover	EMI	5 September 2019	
Taylor Swift	14	Folklore	EMI	6 August 2020	
Taylor Swift	14	Evermore	EMI	24 December 2020	
Taylor Swift	14	Fearless (Taylor's Version)	EMI	22 April 2021	
Taylor Swift	14	Red (Taylor's Version)	EMI	25 November 2021	
Taylor Swift	14	Midnights	EMI	3 November 2022	
Taylor Swift	14	Speak Now (Taylor's Version)	EMI	20 July 2023	
Taylor Swift	14	1989 (Taylor's Version)	EMI	3 November 2023	
Taylor Swift	14	The Tortured Poets Department	EMI	26 April 2024	
Taylor Swift	14	Lover (Live from Paris)	EMI	14 February 2025	
Taylor Swift	14	The Life of a Showgirl	EMI	10 October 2025	
Madonna	13	Like a Virgin	Sire	15 September 1985	
Madonna	13	True Blue	Sire	6 July 1986	
Madonna	13	Like a Prayer	Sire	26 March 1989	
Madonna	13	The Immaculate Collection	Sire	18 November 1990	
Madonna	13	Evita (Note: Credited to Madonna & various artists.)	Warner Bros.	26 January 1997	
Madonna	13	Ray of Light	Maverick	8 March 1998	
Madonna	13	Music	Maverick	24 September 2000	
Madonna	13	American Life	Maverick	27 April 2003	
Madonna	13	Confessions on a Dance Floor	Warner Bros.	20 November 2005	
Madonna	13	Hard Candy	Warner Bros.	4 May 2008	
Madonna	13	Celebration	Warner Bros.	27 September 2009	
Madonna	13	MDNA	Interscope	1 April 2012	
Madonna	13	Confessions II	Warner	10 July 2026	
Elvis Presley	13	Rock 'N' Roll	His Master's Voice	4 November 1956	
Elvis Presley	13	Loving You	RCA	1 September 1957	
Elvis Presley	13	King Creole	RCA	14 September 1958	
Elvis Presley	13	Elvis Is Back!	RCA	24 July 1960	
Elvis Presley	13	G.I. Blues	RCA	1 August 1961	
Elvis Presley	13	Blue Hawaii	RCA	31 December 1961	
Elvis Presley	13	Pot Luck	RCA	22 July 1962	
Elvis Presley	13	From Elvis in Memphis	RCA Victor	24 August 1969	
Elvis Presley	13	Elvis' 40 Greatest	Arcade	4 September 1977	
Elvis Presley	13	ELV1S: 30 No. 1 Hits	RCA	29 September 2002	
Elvis Presley	13	The King	RCA	19 August 2007	
Elvis Presley	13	If I Can Dream (Note: Credited to Elvis Presley with the Royal Philharmonic Orchestra.)	RCA, Legacy Recordings	6 November 2015	
Elvis Presley	13	The Wonder of You (Note: Credited to Elvis Presley with the Royal Philharmonic Orchestra.)	RCA, Legacy Recordings	28 October 2016	
Bruce Springsteen	12	Born in the U.S.A.	CBS	16 June 1984	
Bruce Springsteen	12	Tunnel of Love	CBS	17 October 1987	
Bruce Springsteen	12	Human Touch	Columbia	4 April 1992	
Bruce Springsteen	12	Greatest Hits	Columbia	11 March 1995	
Bruce Springsteen	12	The Rising	Columbia	10 August 2002	
Bruce Springsteen	12	Devils & Dust	Columbia	7 May 2005	
Bruce Springsteen	12	Magic	Columbia	13 October 2007	
Bruce Springsteen	12	Working on a Dream	Columbia	2 July 2009	
Bruce Springsteen	12	Wrecking Ball	Columbia	11 March 2012	
Bruce Springsteen	12	High Hopes	Columbia	19 January 2014	
Bruce Springsteen	12	Western Stars	Columbia	27 June 2019	
Bruce Springsteen	12	Letter to You	Columbia	5 November 2020	
U2	12	War	Island	6 March 1983	
U2	12	The Unforgettable Fire	Island	7 October 1984	
U2	12	The Joshua Tree	Island	15 March 1987	
U2	12	Rattle and Hum	Island	16 October 1988	
U2	12	Zooropa	Island	11 July 1993	
U2	12	Pop	Island	9 March 1997	
U2	12	The Best of 1980–1990	Island	8 November 1998	
U2	12	All That You Can't Leave Behind	Island	5 November 2000	
U2	12	How to Dismantle an Atomic Bomb	Island	28 November 2004	
U2	12	No Line on the Horizon	Vertigo	8 March 2009	
U2	12	Songs of Surrender	Island	24 March 2023	
U2	12	Carnaval de Luz	Island	20 November 2026	
David Bowie	11	Aladdin Sane	RCA	5 May 1973	
David Bowie	11	Pin Ups	RCA	3 November 1973	
David Bowie	11	Diamond Dogs	RCA	8 June 1974	
David Bowie	11	Scary Monsters (and Super Creeps)	RCA	27 September 1980	
David Bowie	11	Let's Dance	EMI America	23 April 1983	
David Bowie	11	Tonight	EMI America	6 October 1984	
David Bowie	11	Changesbowie	EMI America	24 March 1990	
David Bowie	11	Black Tie White Noise	Arista	17 April 1993	
David Bowie	11	The Next Day	ISO, Columbia	23 March 2013	
David Bowie	11	Blackstar	RCA	15 January 2016	
David Bowie	11	Best of Bowie	EMI	5 February 2016	
Eminem	11	The Marshall Mathers LP	Interscope	23 May 2000	
Eminem	11	The Eminem Show	Interscope	26 May 2002	
Eminem	11	Encore	Interscope	11 December 2004	
Eminem	11	Curtain Call: The Hits	Interscope	6 December 2005	
Eminem	11	Relapse	Interscope	15 May 2009	
Eminem	11	Recovery	Interscope	18 June 2010	
Eminem	11	The Marshall Mathers LP 2	Interscope	5 November 2013	
Eminem	11	Revival	Interscope	15 December 2017	
Eminem	11	Kamikaze	Interscope	31 August 2018	
Eminem	11	Music to Be Murdered By	Interscope	17 January 2020	
Eminem	11	The Death of Slim Shady (Coup de Grâce)	Interscope	20 July 2024	
Kylie Minogue	11	Kylie	PWL	16 July 1988	
Kylie Minogue	11	Enjoy Yourself	PWL	21 October 1989	
Kylie Minogue	11	Greatest Hits	PWL	5 September 1992	
Kylie Minogue	11	Fever	Parlophone	13 October 2001	
Kylie Minogue	11	Aphrodite	Parlophone	17 July 2010	
Kylie Minogue	11	Golden	BMG Rights Management	19 April 2018	
Kylie Minogue	11	Step Back in Time: The Definitive Collection	BMG Rights Management	11 July 2019	
Kylie Minogue	11	Disco	BMG Rights Management	19 November 2020	
Kylie Minogue	11	Tension	BMG Rights Management	29 September 2023	
Kylie Minogue	11	Tension II	BMG Rights Management	25 October 2024	
Kylie Minogue	11	Kylie Christmas (Fully Wrapped)	Parlophone	12 December 2025	
Rod Stewart	11	Every Picture Tells a Story	Mercury	2 October 1971	
Rod Stewart	11	Never a Dull Moment	Philips	16 September 1972	
Rod Stewart	11	Sing It Again Rod	Mercury	1 September 1973	
Rod Stewart	11	Smiler	Mercury	19 October 1974	
Rod Stewart	11	Atlantic Crossing	Warner Bros.	30 August 1975	
Rod Stewart	11	A Night on the Town	Riva	10 July 1976	
Rod Stewart	11	Greatest Hits, Vol. 1	Riva	8 December 1979	
Rod Stewart	11	Time	Capitol	25 May 2013	
Rod Stewart	11	Blood Red Roses	Decca	11 October 2018	
Rod Stewart	11	You're in My Heart: Rod Stewart with the Royal Philharmonic Orchestra	Rhino	13 December 2019	
Rod Stewart	11	Swing Fever (Note: Credited to Rod Stewart and Jools Holland.)	Warner	1 March 2024	
ABBA	10	Greatest Hits	Epic	2 May 1976	
ABBA	10	Arrival	Epic	9 January 1977	
ABBA	10	ABBA: The Album	Epic	29 January 1978	
ABBA	10	Voulez-Vous	Epic	13 May 1979	
ABBA	10	Greatest Hits Vol. 2	Epic	11 November 1979	
ABBA	10	Super Trouper	Epic	16 November 1980	
ABBA	10	The Visitors	Epic	13 December 1981	
ABBA	10	The Singles: The First Ten Years	Epic	21 November 1982	
ABBA	10	Gold: Greatest Hits	Polydor	27 September 1992	
ABBA	10	Voyage	Universal	12 November 2021	
Coldplay	10	Parachutes	Parlophone	22 July 2000	
Coldplay	10	A Rush of Blood to the Head	Parlophone	7 September 2002	
Coldplay	10	X&Y	Parlophone	6 June 2005	
Coldplay	10	Viva la Vida or Death and All His Friends	Parlophone	18 June 2008	
Coldplay	10	Mylo Xyloto	Parlophone	5 November 2011	
Coldplay	10	Ghost Stories	Parlophone	19 May 2014	
Coldplay	10	A Head Full of Dreams	Parlophone	18 February 2016	
Coldplay	10	Everyday Life	Parlophone	5 December 2019	
Coldplay	10	Music of the Spheres	Parlophone	28 October 2021	
Coldplay	10	Moon Music	Parlophone	11 October 2024	
Michael Jackson	10	Thriller	Epic	27 February 1983	
Michael Jackson	10	18 Greatest Hits (Note: Credited to Michael Jackson Plus The Jackson 5.)	Telstar	14 August 1983	
Michael Jackson	10	Bad	Epic	6 September 1987	
Michael Jackson	10	Dangerous	Epic	24 November 1991	
Michael Jackson	10	HIStory: Past, Present and Future, Book I	Epic	18 June 1995	
Michael Jackson	10	Blood on the Dance Floor: HIStory in the Mix	Epic	18 May 1997	
Michael Jackson	10	Invincible	Epic	4 November 2001	
Michael Jackson	10	Number Ones	Epic	23 November 2003	
Michael Jackson	10	The Essential Michael Jackson	Epic	5 July 2009	
Michael Jackson	10	Xscape	Epic	18 May 2014	
Elton John	10	Don't Shoot Me I'm Only the Piano Player	DJM	4 February 1972	
Elton John	10	Goodbye Yellow Brick Road	DJM	16 December 1973	
Elton John	10	Caribou	DJM	7 July 1974	
Elton John	10	Greatest Hits	DJM	17 November 1974	
Elton John	10	Sleeping with the Past	The Rocket Record Company	22 July 1990	
Elton John	10	The Very Best of Elton John	PolyGram	4 November 1990	
Elton John	10	Good Morning to the Night (Note: Credited to Elton John and Pnau.)	Mercury	22 July 2012	
Elton John	10	The Lockdown Sessions	EMI	29 October 2021	
Elton John	10	Diamonds	The Rocket Record Company	10 January 2025	
Elton John	10	Who Believes in Angels? (Note: Credited to Elton John and Brandi Carlile.)	Interscope	11 April 2025	
Queen	10	A Night at the Opera	EMI	21 December 1975	
Queen	10	A Day at the Races	EMI	2 January 1977	
Queen	10	The Game	EMI	13 July 1980	
Queen	10	Greatest Hits	EMI	8 November 1981	
Queen	10	A Kind of Magic	EMI	8 June 1986	
Queen	10	The Miracle	Parlophone	28 May 1989	
Queen	10	Innuendo	Parlophone	10 February 1991	
Queen	10	Greatest Hits II	Parlophone	3 November 1991	
Queen	10	Made in Heaven	Parlophone	12 November 1995	
Queen	10	Live Around the World (Note: Credited to Queen + Adam Lambert.)	EMI	2 October 2020	
