= Lucy Woodward =

American singer-songwriter

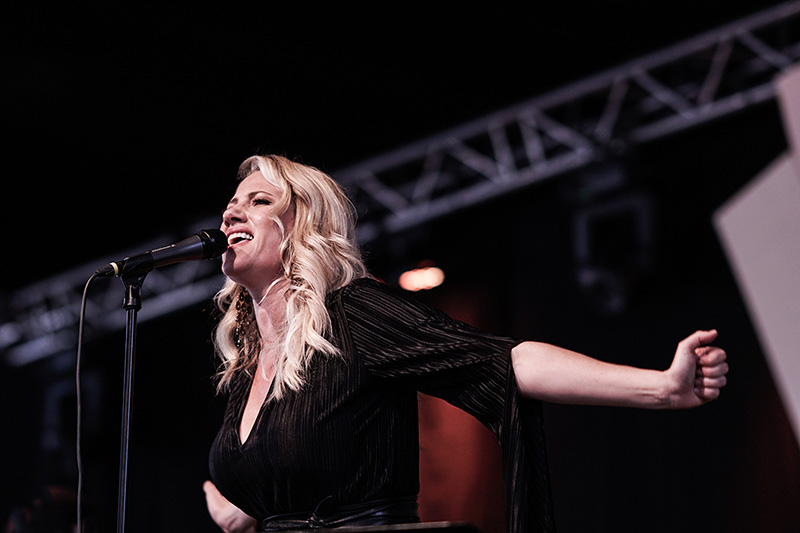
- Lucy Woodward at the Aarhus Jazz Festival in Denmark in 2017

Background information
- Born: 27 October 1977 (age 48); London, England
- Genres: Pop; rock; jazz; R&B
- Occupation: Singer
- Years active: 1999–present
- Labels: Atlantic; GroundUP; Verve
- Website: lucywoodward.com

Lucy Woodward (born 27 October 1977) is an English-American singer-songwriter. She has released records on Atlantic, Verve, and GroundUP and has sung with many artists including Rod Stewart, Barbra Streisand, Snarky Puppy, Celine Dion, Pink Martini, Gavin DeGraw, Joe Cocker, Chaka Khan, Nikka Costa, and Randy Jackson. She co-wrote Stacie Orrico's Top 40 hit "(There's Gotta Be) More to Life".

== Early life ==
A native of London, England, she is the daughter of British conductor Kerry Woodward, who conducted the BBC Singers, and his American wife Julie Woodward, who was an editor of The New Grove Dictionary of Music and Musicians. Woodward's parents mounted the first performances of Viktor Ullmann's opera Der Kaiser von Atlantis, which Ullmann composed while interned in a Nazi concentration camp. Woodward's family moved to Amsterdam when her father was appointed musical director of the Netherlands Chamber Choir. Two years later her parents separated, and she moved with her mother and brother to New York City to live with her grandparents.

Raised on classical and Middle Eastern music, Woodward studied piano and flute before receiving singing lessons at age 12. She attended high school in The Bronx and sang house music in her friends' basements. During summers she attended music camp and visited her father in the Netherlands, where she frequently locked herself in her father's studio and listened to jazz and R&B records. At the age of 16, Woodward was accepted to the Manhattan School of Music to study jazz, but after a year she decided to drop out to focus on songwriting and performing. She spent the next few years in swing organ trios, including The Sugarman 3, working as a session singer, a waitress, and singing jazz standards in restaurants in Greenwich Village.

== Career ==
Lucy Woodward performing with Snarky Puppy

Lucy Woodward with singer Rod Stewart

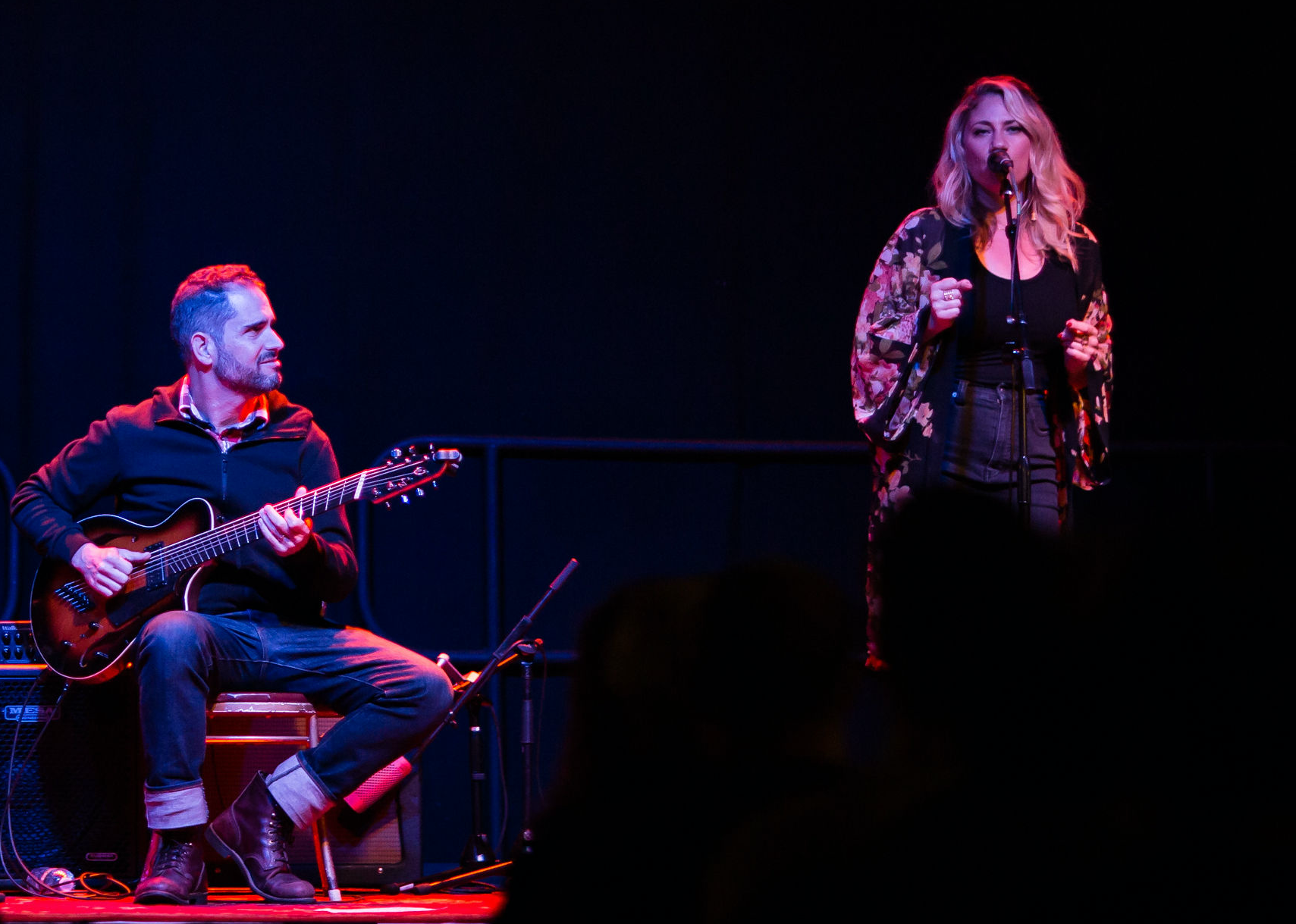
Lucy Woodward and guitarist Charlie Hunter

In 2003 Woodward signed with Atlantic Records and recorded her debut album While You Can, which entered the Top 150 on the Billboard 200. The album included Woodward's Top 40 hit "Dumb Girls", which she had written with producer Kevin Kadish before signing with Atlantic. Other songs on While You Can were produced at Jim Henson Studios by John Shanks. She toured internationally and appeared on The Tonight Show with Jay Leno.

During the following year, Woodward was asked by producer Jaime Houston to record the big-band tune "It's Oh So Quiet" for the Disney film Ice Princess; the song was later used in various TV shows, commercials, and the Birds of Prey trailer. The song was first recorded by Betty Hutton in 1948 and later covered by Björk on her 1995 album Post. Woodward considers it a turning point in her career and the inspiration for much of her second album, Lucy Woodward Is...Hot and Bothered. The album was released in 2008 and distributed exclusively by Barnes & Noble as part of its Discover Great New Music program. It was produced by Itaal Shur and Tim K. The song "Hot and Bothered" takes its melody from a Yiddish lullaby that Woodward's grandmother sang to her as a baby. Woodward appeared on Randy Jackson's 2008 album Randy Jackson's Music Club, Vol. 1, singing the duet "Willing to Try" with Richie Sambora and Travis Tritt.

Woodward also contributed songs to the soundtracks for Last Vegas, The Blind Side, Ice Princess, Music and Lyrics, What a Girl Wants, First Daughter, and Accepted. Her version of "It's Oh So Quiet" appeared in the Disney film Ice Princess. She co-wrote the Stacie Orrico Top 40 worldwide hit "There's Gotta Be More to Life", which earned her a BMI Christian Music Award in 2003 and a BMI Songwriter's Pop Award in 2004. Originally called "More to Life", the song was written with Kevin Kadish and Sabelle Breer for Woodward's 2003 Atlantic debut but was released instead on the Japanese import version of the album as a bonus track. In 2010, Woodward co-wrote and recorded "Daylight as Sunset" for Earthrise Soundsystem's debut The Yoga Sessions.

Woodward's third album Hooked! (Verve, 2010) was recorded at Stratosphere Sound in New York City and Jim Henson Studios in Hollywood. It was produced by Tony Visconti and included contributions by Tim K, Justin Stanley, and Itaal Shur. Woodward wrote much of the album with Dan Petty and Michelle Lewis, saying that she had been inspired by the music of Peggy Lee and Django Reinhardt. The album also received comparisons to Dusty Springfield and Brill Building. The song "Another Woman" was written for her by longtime inspiration Nellie McKay, who sang background vocals. Woodward toured throughout the US, including with jazz fusion band Snarky Puppy, which played on her cover version of "Be My Husband" by Nina Simone. In 2011, she was asked by Armed Forces Entertainment to perform at American military bases in Italy, Turkey, and Spain.

In 2010, Woodward collaborated with guitarist Hendrik Helmer for Verve Records, including for the music video Ragdoll.

In 2011, Woodward started working with Snarky Puppy bandleader Michael League. League performed in Woodward's touring band, and Woodward opened for Snarky Puppy with them as her backing band. She sang "Too Hot to Last" on the band's album Family Dinner - Volume 1. Woodward also appeared in the 2011 Garry Marshall film New Year's Eve where she played the backing vocalist for Jon Bon Jovi and Lea Michele. Woodward was featured in the September 2011 issue of Italian Vogue as one of the year's top up-and-coming female recording artists.

That same year, she toured with Pink Martini after the singer China Forbes had surgery. From 2012 to 2016 she worked as a background vocalist for Rod Stewart, singing on the albums Blood Red Roses, Another Country, Time, and Merry Christmas, Baby as well as touring internationally with him, including at the 2015 BBC Music Awards.

After Woodward, Holly Palmer, and songwriter Michelle Lewis first came together to sing at a Christmas Party in 2010, they decided soon after to write swing and boogie songs under the name The Goods. They released the single "I'm So Happy That It's You" in May 2013, followed by a five-song debut EP later that year and a holiday EP titled Get Your Holiday Goods! in 2018.

Woodward released her fourth album Til They Bang on the Door (GroundUP Music) in 2016. The album was co-produced by Michael League and Henry Hey, mixed by Nic Hard, and included musicians Everett Bradley, Dave Eggar, Cory Henry, Natalia 'Saw Lady' Paruz, and members of Snarky Puppy.

In 2017, she performed with the Danish group TipToe Big Band at the Aarhus Jazz Festival. A year later she worked with the WDR Big Band and Chris Walden. She has also sung with the Dave Richards Big Band in Los Angeles and with the Henry Mancini Institute Orchestra. Woodward recently performed with the hr-Bigband with arrangements and conducting by Jim McNeely.

In 2018, Woodward was asked to perform a duo tour with jazz guitarist Charlie Hunter after his original tour collaborator Silvana Estrada had to cancel last minute because of visa issues. Their resulting collaboration led to multiple international tours, including a performance on NPR Music's Mountain Stage. and two albums together: Music!Music!Music! released in 2019 and I'm a Stranger Here released in 2020. Both albums included songs by Blind Willie Johnson, Bessie Smith, En Vogue, Nina Simone, and Terence Trent D'Arby.

In 2024, Woodward released two albums: Stories From The Dust and Lucy Woordward & The Rocketeers. Stories From The Dust was recorded at Sonic Ranch in Tornillo, Texas and released in April 2024. Most of the album was co-written with and co-produced by David Garza (Fiona Apple). The album included bassist Tim Lefebvre (David Bowie, Tedeschi Trucks Band), drummer Amy Wood (Fiona Apple), and singers Gaby Moreno, Stevvi Alexander, and Holly Palmer. Lucy Woordward & The Rocketeers was released in July 2024 on GroundUP Music. This album was Woodward's first live jazz orchestra recording, and it was recorded and filmed in LantarenVenster in Rotterdam, Netherlands.

Woodward has also sung background vocals for Celine Dion, Rod Stewart, Carole King, Joe Cocker, Barbra Streisand, The Doobie Brothers, Michael Bolton, Nikka Costa, Gavin DeGraw, and Monkey House.

== Volunteering ==
A frequent visitor to Kenya and Rwanda, Woodward organizes an annual benefit concert for the Cura Orphanage outside Nairobi at Jim Henson Studios. She has performed for the UN Mine Action Service and at the Millennium Development Goals Awards. Woodward sang for Desmond Tutu at a benefit for the Desmond Tutu Peace Foundation. She also served with World Central Kitchen in Przemyśl, Poland in April 2022 to cook for Ukrainian refugees during the Russian invasion of Ukraine.

== Awards and honors ==
- BMI Christian Music Award, "There's Gotta Be More to Life", 2003
- BMI Songwriter's Pop Award, "There's Gotta Be More to Life", 2004

== Discography ==
=== Albums ===
- While You Can (Atlantic, 2003)
- Lucy Woodward Is...Hot & Bothered (Barnes & Noble, 2007)
- Hooked! (Verve, 2010)
- The Goods EP (2013)
- Get Your Holiday Goods with The Goods (2015)
- Til They Bang On the Door (GroundUP, 2016)
- Music!Music!Music! with Charlie Hunter (Mocloud, 2019)
- I'm a Stranger Here with Charlie Hunter (2020)
- Stories From The Dust (2024)
- Lucy Woodward & The Rocketeers (GroundUP, 2024)

=== As guest ===
- Groove Collective, "Up All Night" (1999)
- The Scumfrog, "Bacon" (2004)
- Home & Garden, "Domesticated" (2008)
- Randy Jackson, Randy Jackson Music Club Vol. 1, "Willing To Try" (2008)
- Earthrise Soundsystem, "Daylight as Sunset" (2009)
- Charles Walker & the Dynamites, "Love Is Only Everything" (2012)
- The Joshua Shneider Lovespeaks Orchestra, The Joshua Shneider Lovespeaks Orchestra (2013)
- Snarky Puppy, Family Dinner - Volume 1, "Too Hot To Last" (2013)
- David Ricard Big Band, Holiday Swingin (2015)
- Guilt by Association Vol. 4 (Compilation), "Shapes of Things" (2016)
- Phat Cat Swinger, The Phat Cat Swinger Christmas Album, "Frosty" (2018)
- Chris Grey & The BlueSpand, "Feed The Monkey" (2018)
- Broken Brass Ensemble, "Piece Of Your Heaven" (2019)
- Drifter, "True Love" (2021)
- Steve Shapiro, "Extremely Moderate" (2022)
- Dennis van Aarssen, "Stay For Christmas" (2022)

=== Singles ===
- "Dumb Girls" – 2003 (#112)
- "Blindsided" – 2003
- "Trouble With Me" – 2004
- "Slow Recovery" – 2007/2010
- "Ragdoll" – 2010
- "Be My Husband" – 2012
- "Happy That It's You!" – 2013
- "Kiss Me Mister Histrionics" – 2016
- "Live Live Live" – 2016
- "Can't Let Go" – 2019
- "Soul of a Man" – 2019
- "Stranger Blues" – 2020
- "My Love Will Never Die" – 2020
- "Big Bones" – 2023
- "Fray" – 2023
- "Clenched Fists" – 2023
- "Lady in Waiting" – 2023
- "When You Wish Upon a Star" – 2023
- "Plain Gold Ring" – 2024
- "Love Me Tender" – 2024
- "Tryin' Times" – 2024

=== Film & TV ===
- What a Girl Wants "What's Good for Me" (2003)
- First Daughter "Free" (2004)
- Desperate Housewives "Damsel In Distress" (2005)
- Ice Princess "It's Oh So Quiet" (2005)
- The Barbie Diaries (Movie Soundtrack) "Real Life" (2006)
- Accepted "Don't You Forget About Me" (2006)
- Music and Lyrics (2007)
- The Blind Side "Trouble with Me" (2009)
- New Year's Eve (2011)
- Footloose "Footloose Theme Song" (2011)
- The Possession "Maybe We Deserve Each Other" (2012)
- Last Vegas "Drunken Stars" (2013)
- State of Bacon "World Like This" (2014)
- Manhattan Night "If I Never Met You" (2016)
- Birds of Prey "It's Oh So Quiet" (2020)
