= Merry Christmas, Baby (album) =

Studio album by Rod Stewart
- Released: 30 October 2012
- Studios: Chartmaker Studios and Blue Studios (Malibu, California); Henson Recording Studios (Hollywood, California); The Village Recorder, Satinwood Studio and Studio City Sound (Los Angeles, California); Garage Studios (Palm Beach, Florida); Echo Beach Studios (Jupiter, Florida); Fudge Recording Studio (New Orleans, Louisiana); Orchestra recorded at Abbey Road Studios (London, England) and Angel Recording Studios (Islington, England)
- Genres: Christmas; soul; jazz
- Length: 46:04
- Label: Verve
- Producers: David Foster; Rod Stewart; Kevin Savigar

Rod Stewart chronology
Fly Me to the Moon... The Great American Songbook Volume V (2010)	Merry Christmas, Baby (2012)	Time (2013)

Merry Christmas, Baby is the first Christmas album by Rod Stewart and his 27th studio album overall, released on 30 October 2012. The album has proved to be a top 10 success in many countries including the UK, US, Canada and Australia. It was certified Platinum by the Recording Industry Association of America in November 2012 with over 1,000,000 copies sold in the US.

== Critical reception ==
Professional ratings
Aggregate scores
Source	Rating
Metacritic	53/100
Review scores
Source	Rating
AllMusic	2.5/5 stars
BBC Music	(positive)
The Guardian	3/5 stars
The Independent	3/5 stars
NME	3/10
Slant Magazine	3/5 stars

Merry Christmas, Baby received mixed reviews from music critics. At Metacritic, which assigns a normalized rating out of 100 to reviews from mainstream critics, the album received an average score of 53, which indicates "mixed or average reviews", based on 6 reviews.

== Commercial performance ==
Merry Christmas, Baby debuted at No. 3 on the Billboard 200 album sales chart, with first week sales of 117,000 copies according to Nielsen SoundScan, and spent a total of eight weeks in the top 10. With total U.S. sales of 858,000 copies in 2012 according to SoundScan, Merry Christmas, Baby was the best-selling Christmas/holiday album of the year. The album was also the year's fifteenth best-selling album in the U.S. according to Billboard and the ninth best-selling physical album in the U.S. according to the Nielsen Company's 2012 Music Industry Report.

In the UK, the album debuted at No. 2 on the Official Albums Chart and has so far spent six weeks in the top 10. It sold 421,000 copies in the UK in 2012 and its current UK sales stand at 636,000.

In Canada, the album spent eight weeks in the top ten of the Canadian Albums Chart, with three consecutive weeks at the No. 1 spot. It was the ninth best-selling album in Canada in 2012 according to year-end sales data from Nielsen SoundScan Canada with sales of 135,000.

Worldwide, the album achieved total 2012 sales of 2.6 million according to the International Federation of the Phonographic Industry, making it the seventh best-selling album of the year.

== Track listing ==
- All tracks produced by David Foster; except "Auld Lang Syne" produced by Rod Stewart and Kevin Savigar.

No.	Title	Writer(s)	Arranger(s)	Length
1.	"Have Yourself a Merry Little Christmas"	Hugh Martin, Ralph Blane		4:31
2.	"Santa Claus Is Coming to Town"	J. Fred Coots, Haven Gillespie		2:48
3.	"Winter Wonderland" (featuring Michael Bublé)	Felix Bernard, Richard B. Smith		2:26
4.	"White Christmas"	Irving Berlin		3:49
5.	"Merry Christmas, Baby" (featuring CeeLo Green & Trombone Shorty)	Johnny Moore, Lou Baxter		3:53
6.	"Let It Snow! Let It Snow! Let It Snow!" (featuring Dave Koz)	Sammy Cahn, Jule Styne		2:51
7.	"What Are You Doing New Year's Eve?" (featuring Ella Fitzgerald & Chris Botti)	Frank Loesser		3:43
8.	"Blue Christmas"	Billy Hayes, Jay W. Johnson		3:30
9.	"Red-Suited Super Man" (featuring Trombone Shorty)	Rod Stewart, David Foster, Amy Foster		3:11
10.	"When You Wish upon a Star"	Leigh Harline, Ned Washington		3:47
11.	"We Three Kings" (featuring Mary J. Blige)	John Henry Hopkins Jr.		3:27
12.	"Silent Night"	Franz Xaver Gruber, Joseph Mohr		4:24
13.	"Auld Lang Syne"	Traditional, Robert Burns	Kevin Savigar	3:45
Total length:				46:04

Deluxe edition bonus tracks
No.	Title	Writer(s)	Length
14.	"What Child Is This?"	Traditional, William Chatterton Dix	4:17
15.	"The Christmas Song (Chestnuts Roasting on an Open Fire)"	Mel Tormé, Robert Wells	3:39
16.	"Silver Bells"	Jay Livingston, Ray Evans	3:25
Total length:			57:25

Note

- "What Are You Doing New Year's Eve" uses a vocal sample of the Ella Fitzgerald recording of the same name

== Personnel ==
Musicians and Vocalists

- Rod Stewart – vocals
- David Foster – acoustic piano (1–3, 6–8, 10, 15), keyboards (5, 9, 11, 12, 14, 16)
- Jochem van der Saag – synthesizers (1–12, 14–16) programming (1–12, 14–16), sound design (1–12, 14–16)
- Kevin Savigar – keyboards (13), programming (13)
- Dean Parks – guitars (1–3, 5–9, 11, 12, 14–16), guitar solo (4, 10), mandolin (16)
- Emerson Swinford – guitars (13)
- Jorge Vivo – additional guitars (14)
- Chuck Berghofer – bass (1, 2, 6–8, 10, 14, 15)
- Peter Erskine – drums (1, 2, 7, 10, 15)
- Matt O'Connor – percussion (2, 3, 5, 6, 9), additional percussion (11, 14)
- Jeff Driskel – saxophones (2, 6, 7)
- Dan Oestreicher – baritone saxophone (5, 9)
- Tim McFatter – tenor saxophone (5, 9)
- Dave Koz – saxophone solo (6)
- Jimmy Roberts – saxophone solo (9)
- Bob McChesney – trombones (2, 6)
- Trombone Shorty – trombone (5, 9), trumpet (5, 9)
- Chris Walden – trumpets (2, 6, 7), trombones (7)
- Chris Botti – trumpet solo (7)
- J'Anna Jacoby – violin (13)
- Caroline Campbell – violin solo (14, 16)
- Michael Bublé – vocals (3)
- CeeLo Green – vocals (5)
- Bridget Cady – backing vocals (5, 9)
- Kim Johnson – backing vocals (5, 9)
- Dieyelle Reed – backing vocals (5, 9)
- Ella Fitzgerald – sampled vocals (7)
- Mary J. Blige – vocals (11)
- Page LA Children's Chorus – backing vocals (12)
- Bobbi Page – vocal contractor (12)

Choir on "Auld Lang Syne"

- Mabvuto Carpenter
- Angie Fisher (also choir contractor)
- Kim Johnson
- Krystal Johnson
- Jason Morales
- Dieyelle Reed
- Will Wheaton

Gospel Choir

- Keith Allen
- Bridget Cady
- Bryan Terrell Clark
- David Daughtry
- Angie Fisher
- Melanie Fontana
- Kim Johnson (also choir contractor)
- Michelle Lewis
- Holly Palmer
- Dieyelle Reed
- Brandon Winbush
- Lucy Woodward

Children's Choir

- Madeline Bernstein
- Carson Billingsley
- Sam Binschadler
- Jackson Hatwan
- Katherine Ho
- Brandon Large
- Karissa Lee
- Emme Lehmann-Boddicker
- Claire McNeely
- Bobbi Page
- Jordan Santamaria

Music arrangements

- David Foster – arrangements, string arrangements (1–4, 9–14), horn arrangements (2, 5, 6, 8, 9)
- William Ross – string arrangements (1, 4, 10–15)
- Chris Walden – orchestra conductor (1–4, 8–15), horn arrangements (2, 6, 7), string arrangements (3, 8, 9)
- Isobel Griffiths – orchestra contractor (1–4, 8–15)
- Nathan Kelly – horn arrangements (5)
- Rod Stewart – arrangements (11–14)
- Kevin Savigar – arrangements (13)
- Dean Parks – arrangements (14)
- Jochem van der Saag – arrangements (14)

== Production ==
- Jay Landers – A&R
- Katherine Tempesta – A&R coordinator
- Evelyn Morgan – A&R administrator
- David Hage – music copyist
- Thanh Tran – music copyist
- Jullian Peploe Studio – art direction, design
- Penny Lancaster – photography
- Arnold Stiefel – management

Technical credits

- Vlado Meller – mastering at Vlado Meller Mastering (Charleston, South Carolina)
- Jochem van der Saag – mixing, recording (1–12, 14–16), engineer (1–12, 14–16)
- Don Murray – recording (1–12, 14–16)
- Jorge Vito – recording (1–12, 14–16), engineer (1–12, 14–16)
- Kevin Savigar – engineer (13)
- Tom Weir – choir recording (13)
- Jack Miele – additional recording (1–12, 14–16)
- Jonathan Allen – orchestra recording (1–4, 8–15)
- Steve Price – orchestra recording (1–4, 8–15)
- John Barrett – orchestra Pro Tools engineer (1–4, 8–15)
- Matt O'Connor – technical assistant for Rod Stewart

== Charts ==
=== Weekly charts ===
Chart (2012)	Peak position
Australian Albums (ARIA)	3
Austrian Albums (Ö3 Austria)	5
Belgian Albums (Ultratop Flanders)	30
Belgian Albums (Ultratop Wallonia)	41
Canadian Albums (Billboard)	1
Croatian International Albums (HDU)	38
Danish Albums (Hitlisten)	33
Dutch Albums (Album Top 100)	6
German Albums (Offizielle Top 100)	22
Hungarian Albums (MAHASZ)	28
Irish Albums (IRMA)	5
Italian Albums (FIMI)	28
New Zealand Albums (RMNZ)	1
Norwegian Albums (VG-lista)	7
Polish Albums (ZPAV)	16
Portuguese Albums (AFP)	12
Scottish Albums (Official Charts)	2
Spanish Albums (Promusicae)	20
Swedish Albums (Sverigetopplistan)	2
Swiss Albums (Schweizer Hitparade)	45
UK Albums (Official Charts)	2
US Billboard 200	3

=== Year-end charts ===
Chart (2012)	Position
Australian Albums (ARIA)	20
Dutch Albums (Album Top 100)	96
Swedish Albums (Sverigetopplistan)	16
UK Albums (OCC)	14
US Billboard 200	170

Chart (2013)	Position
Canadian Albums (Billboard)	15
UK Albums (OCC)	77
US Billboard 200	26

== Certifications ==
Region	Certification	Certified units/sales
Australia (ARIA)	2× Platinum	140,000^{^}
Canada (Music Canada)	3× Platinum	240,000^{^}
Ireland (IRMA)	Platinum	15,000^{^}
New Zealand (RMNZ)	2× Platinum	30,000^{^}
Poland (ZPAV)	Gold	10,000^{*}
United Kingdom (BPI)	2× Platinum	636,000
United States (RIAA)	Platinum	1,000,000^{^}
^{*} Sales figures based on certification alone.^{^} Shipments figures based on certification alone.

== Awards and recognition ==
In February 2013, the album was nominated for a Canadian Juno Award in the International Album of the Year category.
