= Another Country (Rod Stewart album) =

Studio album by Rod Stewart
- Released: 23 October 2015
- Recorded: 2014–15
- Studios: The Celtic House (Los Angeles, California); Woodhouse Studio (Epping, Essex); Satinwood Studios (Santa Clarita, California)
- Genres: Pop; Rock
- Length: 50:10
- Label: Capitol
- Producers: Rod Stewart; Kevin Savigar

Rod Stewart chronology
Time (2013)	Another Country (2015)	Blood Red Roses (2018)

Singles from Another Country
- 1. "Love Is" Released: 23 June 2015; 2. "Please" Released: 1 September 2015; 3. "Way Back Home" Released: 16 October 2015

Another Country is the 29th studio album by British singer-songwriter Rod Stewart. It was released on 23 October 2015 through Capitol Records. It was produced by Stewart and Kevin Savigar.

== Background ==
Stewart released his twenty-eighth studio album, Time, in 2013. The album contained eleven songs written or co-written by Stewart. Commenting on Time, Stewart stated, "I've found that the only way to write songs is to be as personal and honest as possible, And when my last album was so well-received it gave me the confidence to keep on writing, and to examine and write about different things. It also gave me the freedom to experiment with different sounds like reggae, ska and Celtic melodies."

== Writing and recording ==
Stewart stated that "Batman Superman Spiderman" was written about bedtime stories that he would tell his youngest son, Aiden Patrick Stewart, about the three superheroes. The album's title track, "Another Country" was inspired by Stewart's respect for the armed forces – a respect influenced by his birth occurring shortly before the end of the Second World War – and consequent musing on life in the armed forces, particularly regarding the emotions generated by being apart from loved ones.

Recording sessions for the album took place at Stewart's home, and were produced with Pro Tools.

== Singles ==
"Love Is" was released as the lead single from Another Country on 23 June 2015. In the United States, the single peaked at no. 37 on the Adult Contemporary chart. "Please" and "Way Back Home" were released as subsequent singles on 1 September and 16 October 2015 respectively.

== Critical reception ==
Professional ratings
Aggregate scores
Source	Rating
Metacritic	57/100
Review scores
Source	Rating
American Songwriter	2/5 stars
The Arts Desk	3/5 stars
Financial Times	2/5 stars
The Independent	3/5 stars
The National	3/5 stars
The Scotsman	2/5 stars
OK! Magazine	4/5 stars
Q Magazine	3/5 stars
The Times	3/5 stars
London Evening Standard	3/5 stars
The Yorkshire Times	4/5 stars

Another Country received mixed reviews from music critics. At Metacritic, which assigns a normalized rating out of 100 to reviews from mainstream critics, the album received an average score of 57, which indicates "mixed or average reviews", based on 10 reviews. Andy Gill from The Independent gave the album a mixed review, describing it as "warmly engaging at its best", but that the quality of music dips halfway through the track list, highlighting "Way Back Home" and "Batman Superman Spiderman" as the weakest songs. Jasper Rees from The Arts Desk also gave the album a mixed review, stating that "there is the odd misstep", criticizing the choice to include an excerpt from Winston Churchill's 'We shall fight on the beaches' speech in the outro of "Way Back Home". Hal Horowitz from American Songwriter was highly critical of the album, describing the music as "[ranging from] pedestrian to forced", "excessively sentimental" in parts, and "bland". Ludovic Hunter-Tilney from Financial Times said that "dreary acoustic blandishments and plodding Celtic rock, cut from similar cloth to his 2013 album Time, leave one mourning the roaring roustabout of old." Dawn Renton of The Falkirk Herald gave the album a positive review, noting that "there’s a cosy Celtic charm to Another Country that’s warmly engaging" and concluding that "the latest offering confirms that Rod can still deliver a top notch album ... he continues to show his range and talent and [it] is a rather pleasant surprise to anyone who was never much of a fan in the past."

Kirsty Hatcher of OK! Magazine praised the album as "romantic and charming," while Fiona Shepherd of The Scotsman was critical of the album's nostalgic nature, noting "The Drinking Song" as the only non nostalgic. Noting that song, she concluded, 'Could we have more time in the company of this Rod next time please?" Stephen Thomas Erlewine of AllMusic argued that "as goofy as these numbers are, there's also something appealing about them", stating that "He's not the man he was back in 1969, when his folk was simpler and hungrier, but he's not pretending to be." Owing to his global celebrity status, the new album has been noticed in India as well. While acknowledging the uniqueness of Rod's voice, the Daily Post newspaper has given it a mixed review calling the lyrics as 'cheesy' and 'hollow'. The paper, however, recommends the album if only for the nostalgia it evokes for Rod's earlier work. John Aizlewood of London's Evening Standard stated of the album that "the legendary singer rediscovers his twinkly-eyed charm as he continues his return to form."

The album was selected as the "Album of the Week" by both The Independent and The Times newspapers. Reviews of the album consistently praised Stewart's voice and/or vocal performance, even if the reviewer was critical of other aspects of the album.

== Track listing ==
All tracks produced by Rod Stewart and Kevin Savigar; except "Hold the Line" produced by Stewart, Savigar, RedOne, and TinyIsland.

Another Country — Standard edition
No.	Title	Writer(s)	Length
1.	"Love Is"	Rod Stewart; Kevin Savigar	3:55
2.	"Please"	Stewart; Savigar	4:22
3.	"Walking in the Sunshine"	Stewart; Savigar	4:31
4.	"Love and Be Loved"	Stewart; Savigar	2:55
5.	"We Can Win"	Stewart; Chuck Kentis; Don Kirkpatrick	5:00
6.	"Another Country"	Stewart; Savigar	3:29
7.	"Way Back Home"	Stewart; Savigar	4:35
8.	"Can We Stay Home Tonight?"	Stewart; Savigar	4:04
9.	"Batman Superman Spiderman"	Stewart; Kentis; Kirkpatrick	3:34
10.	"The Drinking Song"	Stewart; Savigar; Emerson Swinford	3:38
11.	"Hold the Line"	RedOne; Tiny Island	4:05
12.	"A Friend for Life"	Steve Harley; Jim Cregan	4:42

Another Country — Deluxe version (bonus tracks)
No.	Title	Writer(s)	Producer(s)	Length
13.	"Every Rock'n'Roll Song to Me"	Stewart; Savigar; Swinford	Stewart; Savigar	3:19
14.	"One Night with You"	Stewart; Savigar; Swinford	Stewart; Savigar	3:34
15.	"In a Broken Dream" (Python Lee Jackson featuring Rod Stewart)	David Keith Bentley	Miki Dallon	4:15
16.	"Great Day"	Stewart; Savigar; Swinford	Stewart; Savigar	3:38
17.	"Last Train Home"	Stewart; Avery Kentis	Stewart; Savigar	4:36

== Personnel ==
- Rod Stewart – vocals
- Kevin Savigar – keyboards (1–14, 16, 17), programming (1–14, 16, 17), bass (2), backing vocals (5), harmonica (13)
- Chuck Kentis – keyboards (5, 9), programming (5, 9)
- Avery Kentis – keyboards (17), programming (17)
- Emerson Swinford – guitars (1–3, 5–7, 10–14, 16, 17), banjo (1), bass (3, 5, 12–14), backing vocals (5), ukulele (11), train conductor (17)
- Marcus Nand – nylon guitar solo (3)
- Mike Severs – guitars (8)
- Don Kirkpatrick – guitars (9)
- Conrad Korsch – bass (1, 2, 6–8, 10, 11, 16)
- Iggy Grimshaw – drums (1–11, 13, 14, 16, 17)
- Julia Thornton – tambourine (1, 3, 4, 13, 14, 16)
- J'Anna Jacoby – violin (1, 5, 6, 11, 16)
- Jimmy Roberts – saxophones (2, 4)
- Nick Lane – trombone (2, 14)
- Anne King – trumpet (2, 6, 14)
- Kimberly Johnson-Breaux – backing vocals (1, 3–6, 9–11, 14, 16)
- Lucy Woodward – backing vocals (1, 3, 4, 6, 9–11, 14, 16)
- Nikki Leonti – backing vocals (3)
- Windy Wagner – backing vocals (3)
- Gavin Cady – backing vocals (5)
- Lionel Conway – backing vocals (5)
- Jim Cregan – backing vocals (5)
- Paul Freeman – backing vocals (5)
- James Harrold – backing vocals (5)
- Matt O'Connor – backing vocals (5)
- Di Reed – backing vocals (5)
- Alastair Stewart – backing vocals (5)
- Winston Churchill – voiceover (7)
- Darryl Phinnessee – backing vocals (8)
- Will Wheaton – backing vocals (8)
- Fred White – backing vocals (8)

Choir (Tracks 2 & 7)

- Keith Allen (2, 7)
- Traci Brown-Bailey (2)
- David Daughtry (2, 7)
- Tia Goodrich (2)
- Nikki Grier (2)
- Kimberly Johnson-Breaux (2, 7)
- Shatisha Lawson-Aponte (2)
- Jason Morales (2, 7)
- Di Reed (2)
- Lucy Woodward (2)
- Angie Fisher (7)
- Sharon McRae (7)
- Andre Washington (7)
- Geneen White (7)

=== Production ===
- Rod Stewart – producer
- Kevin Savigar – producer, engineer, mixing
- Bernie Grundman – mastering at Bernie Grundman Mastering (Hollywood, California)
- Lotus Donovan – A&R administrator
- Nicole Franz – art direction
- Gavin Taylor – art direction, design
- Penny Lancaster Stewart – photography
- Amber Sterling – additional photography
- Arnold Stiefel for Stiefel Entertainment – management

== Charts and certifications ==
=== Weekly charts ===
Chart (2015)	Peak position
Australian Albums (ARIA)	9
Austrian Albums (Ö3 Austria)	14
Belgian Albums (Ultratop Flanders)	11
Belgian Albums (Ultratop Wallonia)	44
Canadian Albums (Billboard)	25
Czech Albums (ČNS IFPI)	18
Danish Albums (Hitlisten)	28
Dutch Albums (Album Top 100)	15
French Albums (SNEP)	159
German Albums (Offizielle Top 100)	7
Italian Albums (FIMI)	44
Irish Albums (IRMA)	4
Japanese Albums (Oricon)	103
New Zealand Albums (RMNZ)	8
Norwegian Albums (VG-lista)	20
Scottish Albums (Official Charts)	2
Spanish Albums (Promusicae)	43
Swedish Albums (Sverigetopplistan)	14
Swiss Albums (Schweizer Hitparade)	19
UK Albums (Official Charts)	2
US Billboard 200	20

=== Year-end charts ===
Chart (2015)	Position
UK Albums (OCC)	16

=== Certifications ===
Region	Certification	Certified units/sales
United Kingdom (BPI)	Platinum	300,000^{‡}
^{‡} Sales+streaming figures based on certification alone.

== Release history ==
Country	Date	Version	Format(s)	Label	Ref.
United States	23 October 2015	Standard; deluxe	CD; digital download; LP	Capitol	
United Kingdom	30 October 2015	Standard; deluxe	CD; digital download; LP	Capitol	
