= Rag doll (disambiguation) =

A rag doll is a toy.

Rag doll or Ragdoll may also refer to:

== Music ==
- "Rag Doll" (Aerosmith song)
- "Rag Doll" (The Four Seasons song)
- "Ragdoll", a song by Maroon 5 from Songs About Jane
- "Ragdoll", a song by Ashlee Simpson from Bittersweet World
- "Ragdoll", a song by David Geraghty from Kill Your Darlings
- "Ragdoll", a song by Lucy Woodward from Hooked!
- Rag Doll, a 1990s American band featuring Rod Jackson (musician)
- "Rag Doll", a song written by Steven Paul Eaton and recorded by Sammy Johns in 1973 and by Art Garfunkel from Breakaway in 1975

== Other uses ==
- Ragdoll, a breed of cats
- Rag Doll (comics), a fictional character in the DC Comics universe
  - Rag Doll (Peter Merkel Jr.), a DC Comics character, son of the above
- Ragdoll (film), a 1999 film by Ted Nicolaou
- Rag Doll (film), a 1961 British B-movie crime film
- Ragdoll (TV series), a TV series
- Ragdoll physics, a video game physics model
- Ragdoll Productions, a British producer of television programmes for children

== See also ==
- The Raggy Dolls, a British cartoon series
