= Lucy Woodward Is...Hot and Bothered =

Lucy Woodward Is...Hot & Bothered

Studio album by Lucy Woodward
- Released: 2007 (iTunes); July 29, 2008 (Barnes & Noble)
- Recorded: 2006–2007
- Genre: Pop, blues
- Label: I Love Desi Music/Barnes & Noble

Lucy Woodward chronology
While You Can (2003)	Lucy Woodward Is...Hot & Bothered (2007)	Hooked (2010)

Lucy Woodward Is...Hot & Bothered is the second studio album from American pop singer, Lucy Woodward. The album was first released on iTunes in 2007. It later had a physical release after being picked up as a Barnes & Noble exclusive in 2008, followed by a re-release on iTunes with additional tracks.

== Track listing ==
1. "Love Is Gonna Getcha" 3:25
2. "Use What I Got" 4:07
3. "Submarine Love" 4:15
4. "You Found Me Out" 4:18
5. "Hot and Bothered" 4:13
6. "What I Can Do" 4:04
7. "Geographical Cure" 4:10
8. "Sugar" 3:59
9. "Don't Wanna Love Again" 3:49
10. "I Won't Care" 5:07

== Singles ==
- "Slow Recovery" (2007)
