= Declassified (Groove Collective album) =

Studio album by Groove Collective
- Released: 1999
- Genre: Funk, acid jazz
- Label: Shanachie
- Producer: Genji Sirasi

Groove Collective chronology
Dance of the Drunken Master (1998)	Declassified (1999)	It's All in Your Mind (2001)

Declassified is an album by the American band Groove Collective, released in 1999.

The album peaked at No. 48 on the Billboard Jazz Albums chart. The band supported it with a North American tour.

== Production ==
The album was produced by band member Genji Sirasi. At the time of the recording, Groove Collective included 14 members. Declassified contains a cover of the Paul McCartney-penned "Martha My Dear". Lucy Woodward contributed vocals to "Up All Night".

== Critical reception ==
Professional ratings
Review scores
Source	Rating
AllMusic	4.5/5 stars
Orange County Register	B+
Pitchfork	7.1/10
Winnipeg Sun	3/5 stars

Pitchfork called Declassified "modern funk that's not afraid to integrate with every other influence held dear by each of its 14 members." The Washington Post thought that the band "are skillful cut-ups, whether they're reconstituting a '70s-funk shuffle ('Up All Night'), toying with what sounds like a PBS-theme fanfare ('Some People'), appropriating Steve Reich's modal shuffle ('Undercover Life') or narcotizing the Beatles' 'Martha My Dear'." The Orange County Register declared that, "were it to lose some of the cloying Spyro Gyra-isms it uses as a crutch, this New York outfit ... would be the tightest bunch of funketeers since the Average White Band, if not P-Funk."

Bass Player wrote: "Ever maturing and enduring, GC shows polish and panache on its latest without abandoning previous experiments with multi-flavored trance-like rhythms." The Philadelphia Inquirer deemed the album "stuttering soul and party-psychedelia creamy with lush melody and Latin grooves." The Boston Herald opined: "Freed by their variety-is-the-spice approach, the New York group is looser and moves better while sharpening its breezy future grooves."

AllMusic wrote that the album "finds the congregation in a most jubilant mood, happy to simply stretch out on a series of infectious singalong jams."

== Track listing ==
No.	Title	Length
1.	"Up All Night"	4:20
2.	"Everything Is Changing"	5:37
3.	"On a Feeling"	4:04
4.	"Some People"	4:59
5.	"Valiha"	0:45
6.	"Undercover Life"	4:27
7.	"Guara Rumba"	1:03
8.	"Crisis"	7:25
9.	"End Transmission"	4:02
10.	"Sabrosona (Song for Chucho)"	3:40
11.	"Nature of a Freak"	5:14
12.	"Triage"	2:09
13.	"Martha My Dear"	3:24
14.	"Sabrosona (Reprise)"	1:10
15.	"Mrs. Strangelove"	3:45
