= Bill Ware =

American jazz vibraphonist (born 1959)

Bill Ware III
- Born: William Anthony Ware III; January 28, 1959 (age 67)
- Genres: Jazz
- Instrument: Vibraphone

Bill Ware III born William Anthony Ware III (b. January 28, 1959, East Orange, New Jersey) is an American jazz vibraphonist.

== Musical career ==
Ware played bass and piano early in his career, playing at the Harlem Jazzmobile. After spending several years playing Latin jazz, he formed his own Latin Jazz group, AM Sleep. He joined the Jazz Passengers in 1987, and in 1990 put together a group of sidemen as the Club Bird All-Stars, who accompanied him on a tour of Japan. Alongside this, he played with Groove Collective and Steely Dan in the first half of the 1990s. Later in the decade he teamed up with fellow former Jazz Passengers, Brad Jones and E. J. Rodriguez, in the ensemble Vibes. His 2001 tribute to Duke Ellington was recorded with Marc Ribot on guitar. Debbie Harry provided guest vocals on his 2002 effort Four. In the mid-2000s, Ware did several projects blending jazz with Western classical musicas well as 5 film scores (with fellow Jazz Passengers bandmate Roy Nathanson).

== Discography ==
=== As leader ===
- Long and Skinny (Knitting Factory, 1993)
- The Adventure (Eightball, 1994)
- This Is No Time (Eightball, 1997)
- Keeping Up with the Jones (Cathexis, 1999)
- Sir Duke (Knitting Factory, 2001)
- Wonder Full (Random Chance, 2008)
- Played Right (Cheetah, 2009)

With Groove Collective

- Groove Collective (Reprise, 1994)
- Nerd (Reprise, 1994)
- We the People (Giant Step, 1996)
- Dance of the Drunken Master (Shanachie, 1998)
- Declassified (Shanachie, 1999)
- It's All in Your Mind (Shanachie, 2001)

With The Jazz Passengers

- Implement Yourself (New World, 1990)
- Live at the Knitting Factory (Knitting Factory, 1991)
- Plain Old Joe (Knitting Factory, 1993)
- In Love (High Street, 1994)
- Individually Twisted (32 Records, 1996)
- Re-United (Justin Time, 2010)
- April 1990 (Promising Music, 2015)
- Still Life with Trouble (Thirsty Ear, 2017)

With Vibes

- Vibes (Knitting Factory, 1998)
- With Drawn (Knitting Factory, 1999)
- Liebe Tunina (Knitting Factory, 2000)
- Vibes 4 (Knitting Factory, 2001)

=== As sideman ===
With Elvis Costello

- When I Was Cruel (Island, 2002)
- Tear Off Your Own Head (Mercury, 2002)
- North (Deutsche Grammophon, 2003)
- The Juliet Letters (Rhino, 2006)

With Roy Nathanson

- Broken Night Red Light (Crepuscule, 1987)
- Deranged & Decomposed (Crepuscule, 1988)
- Little Fred (Crepuscule, 1990)
- Fire at Keaton's Bar & Grill (Six Degrees, 2000)

With others

- Rez Abbasi, Natural Selection (Sunnyside, 2010)
- Rez Abbasi, Intents and Purposes (Enja, 2015)
- Eve Beglarian, Tell the Birds (New World, 2006)
- Brooklyn Funk Essentials, Cool and Steady and Easy (Dorado, 1994)
- Brooklyn Funk Essentials, Big Apple Boogaloo (Dorado, 1996)
- Tom Browne, S' Up (Cheetah, 2010)
- David Byrne, David Byrne (Luaka Bop, 1994)
- Camp Lo, Uptown Saturday Night (Profile, 1997)
- Marshall Crenshaw, What's in the Bag? (Razor & Tie, 2003)
- DJ Logic, Project Logic (Ropeadope, 1999)
- David Gilmore, Transitions (Criss Cross, 2017)
- Corey Glover, Hymns (LaFace, 1998)
- Jerome Harris, Hidden in Plain View (New World, 1995)
- Deborah Harry, Necessary Evil (Eleven Seven Music, 2007)
- Yuka Honda, Memories Are My Only Witness (Tzadik, 2002)
- Katell Keineg, Seasons Castles (Elektra, 1994)
- Los Amigos Invisibles, The New Sound of the Venezuelan Gozadera (Luaka Bop, 1998)
- J. D. Parran, J. D. Parran & Spirit Stage (Y'All of New York, 1997)
- Mario Pavone, Song for Septet (New World, 1994)
- CeCe Peniston, Thought 'Ya Knew (A&M, 1994)
- Bobby Previte, Set the Alarm for Monday (Palmetto, 2008)
- Raw Stylus, Pushing Against the Flow (BMG, 1995)
- Repercussions, Earth and Heaven (Warner Bros., 1995)
- Repercussions, Charmed Life (Canyon, 1997)
- Marc Ribot, Shoe String Symphonettes (Tzadik, 1997)
- Janis Siegel, I Wish You Love (Telarc, 2002)
- Steely Dan, Alive in America (Giant, 1995)
- Andy Summers, Peggy's Blue Skylight (BMG, 2000)
- John Zorn, John Zorn's Cobra: Live at the Knitting Factory (Knitting Factory, 1995)
