= While You Can =

Studio album by Lucy Woodward
- Released: April 8, 2003
- Recorded: 2002–2003
- Genre: Pop
- Label: Atlantic
- Producer: Kevin Kadish, John Shanks

Lucy Woodward chronology
While You Can (2003)	Lucy Woodward Is...Hot & Bothered (2007)

While You Can is the first studio album from American Pop singer, Lucy Woodward, released in April 2003 on Atlantic Records. The standard version of the album contains 11 songs, while the version of the album released in Japan contains two bonus tracks, "Vine To Vine" and "(There's Gotta Be) More To Life", which in turn was later recorded by pop singer Stacie Orrico. It went on to become a moderate success for Orrico.

The debut single from the album, "Dumb Girls," was released in February 2003 and remains Woodward's biggest hit to date. The second and third singles, "Blindsided" and "Trouble With Me," failed to make a major impact; however, the song "What's Good For Me" was a minor success, appearing on several soundtracks, including for the 2003 film What a Girl Wants.

== Track listing ==
1. Dumb Girls 3:40
2. Blindsided 3:24
3. Trust Me (You Don't Wanna See This) 3:13
4. Is This Hollywood 3:32
5. Trouble With Me 3:44
6. What's Good For Me 4:01
7. Standing 4:12
8. The Breakdown 3:42
9. Always Something 3:59
10. Gettin' It On 3:20
11. Done 4:07
12. More To Life (Japan Bonus Track) 2:54
13. Vine To Vine (Japan Bonus Track) 4:14

== Singles ==
- "Dumb Girls" (2003)
- "Blindsided" (2003)
- "Trouble With Me" (2004)

Chart (2003)	Peak position
US Billboard 200	148
US Top Heatseekers	6

== Release history ==
List of release dates, showing region, release format, label and catalog number
Region	Date	Format	Label	Catalog	Ref
Australia	14 July 2003	Compact disc	Warner Bros. Records	7567932042	
