= You're in My Heart: Rod Stewart with the Royal Philharmonic Orchestra =

2019 studio album

Studio album by Rod Stewart with the Royal Philharmonic Orchestra
- Released: 22 November 2019
- Studios: Abbey Road & Angel, London
- Genre: Symphonic rock
- Length: 71:39
- Label: Warner
- Producers: Jim Cregan; Tom Dowd; Bernard Edwards; Bob Ezrin; Faces; Trevor Horn; Jimmy Iovine; Jimmy Jam and Terry Lewis; Glyn Johns; Patrick Leonard; Andy Taylor

Rod Stewart chronology
Blood Red Roses (2018)	You're in My Heart: Rod Stewart with the Royal Philharmonic Orchestra (2019)	The Tears of Hercules (2021)

Singles from You're in My Heart: Rod Stewart with the Royal Philharmonic Orchestra
- 1. "Sailing" Released: 18 September 2019; 2. "I Don't Want To Talk About It" Released: 27 September 2019

Professional ratings
Review scores
Source	Rating
AllMusic	1.5/5 stars

You're in My Heart: Rod Stewart with the Royal Philharmonic Orchestra is an album by British singer-songwriter Rod Stewart. It was released on 22 November 2019 by Warner Records. The album features Rod Stewart's "classic vocal tracks" overdubbed with new arrangements by the Royal Philharmonic Orchestra. Also features 1971 chart toppers in both the UK and US "Maggie May" and "Reason to Believe". The release of You're In My Heart coincided with Stewart's biggest ever UK stadium tour throughout November and December 2019, a continuation of his hugely successful summer stadium tour. You're In My Heart also features "Stop Loving Her Today", a brand-new song, as well as a new recording of "It Takes Two" featuring Robbie Williams.

You're in My Heart topped the UK Albums Chart, staying in the #1 position for three weeks and making it his tenth Number 1 album, and becoming Stewart's 38th top 10 album in the UK (including albums with Faces) and became the first UK number album one of the decade.

== Track listing ==
=== Standard version ===
No.	Title	Writer(s)	Producer(s)	Length
1.	"Maggie May"	Rod Stewart; Martin Quittenton	Trevor Horn; Patrick Leonard	5:47
2.	"It Takes Two" (with Robbie Williams)	William "Mickey" Stevenson; Sylvia Moy	Horn; Rod Stewart; Bernard Edwards	4:22
3.	"Sailing"	Gavin Sutherland	Horn; Tom Dowd	5:27
4.	"Reason to Believe"	Tim Hardin	Horn; Leonard	3:54
5.	"Handbags and Gladrags"	Mike d'Abo	Horn; Leonard	4:10
6.	"Tonight's the Night (Gonna Be Alright)"	Stewart	Horn; Dowd	4:13
7.	"I Don't Want to Talk About It"	Danny Whitten	Horn; Dowd	5:43
8.	"The First Cut Is the Deepest"	Cat Stevens	Horn; Dowd	4:41
9.	"You're in My Heart (The Final Acclaim)"	Stewart	Horn; Dowd	4:38
10.	"I Was Only Joking"	Gary Grainger; Stewart	Horn; Dowd	6:26
11.	"Young Turks"	Stewart; Carmine Appice; Duane Hitchings; Kevin Savigar	Horn; Stewart; Jim Cregan^{[a]}	4:57
12.	"Forever Young"	Cregan; Savigar; Bob Dylan; Stewart	Horn; Stewart; Andy Taylor; Edwards	4:54
13.	"Rhythm of My Heart"	Marc T. Jordan; John Capek	Horn	4:17
14.	"Have I Told You Lately"	Van Morrison	Horn; Stewart; Edwards	4:05
15.	"Stop Loving Her Today"	Simon Climie; Dennis Morgan	Horn; Savigar	4:13

=== Deluxe version ===
Disc 1
No.	Title	Writer(s)	Producer(s)	Length
1.	"Maggie May"	Rod Stewart; Martin Quittenton	Trevor Horn; Patrick Leonard
2.	"Reason to Believe"	Tim Hardin	Horn; Leonard
3.	"Handbags and Gladrags"	Mike d'Abo	Horn; Leonard
4.	"Sailing"	Gavin Sutherland	Horn; Tom Dowd
5.	"Tonight's the Night (Gonna Be Alright)"	Stewart	Horn; Dowd
6.	"The Killing of Georgie (Part I and II)"	Stewart	Horn; Dowd
7.	"I Don't Want to Talk About It"	Danny Whitten	Horn; Dowd
8.	"The First Cut Is the Deepest"	Cat Stevens	Horn; Dowd
9.	"You're in My Heart (The Final Acclaim)"	Stewart	Horn; Dowd
10.	"I Was Only Joking"	Gary Grainger; Stewart	Horn; Dowd

Disc 2
No.	Title	Writer(s)	Producer(s)	Length
1.	"It Takes Two" (with Robbie Williams)	William "Mickey" Stevenson; Sylvia Moy	Horn; Rod Stewart; Bernard Edwards
2.	"Stay with Me"	Stewart; Ronnie Wood	Horn; Glyn Johns; Faces
3.	"Young Turks"	Stewart; Carmine Appice; Duane Hitchings; Kevin Savigar	Horn; Stewart; Jim Cregan^{[a]}
4.	"What Am I Gonna Do (I'm So in Love with You)"	Stewart; Jay Davis; Tony Brock	Horn; Stewart; Jimmy Iovine; Dowd
5.	"Every Beat of My Heart"	Stewart; Savigar	Horn; Bob Ezrin
6.	"Forever Young"	Jim Cregan; Savigar; Bob Dylan; Stewart	Horn; Stewart; Andy Taylor; Edwards
7.	"Downtown Train"	Tom Waits	Horn
8.	"Rhythm of My Heart"	Mark T. Jordan; John Capek	Horn
9.	"Have I Told You Lately"	Van Morrison	Horn; Stewart; Edwards
10.	"Tom Traubert's Blues (Waltzing Matilda)"	Waits	Horn
11.	"If We Fall in Love Tonight"	Jimmy Jam and Terry Lewis	Horn; Jimmy Jam and Terry Lewis
12.	"Stop Loving Her Today"	Simon Climie; Dennis Morgan	Horn; Savigar

Notes

- ^a signifies a co-producer
- ^b signifies an additional vocal producer

== Charts ==
=== Weekly charts ===
Chart (2019)	Peak position
Australian Albums (ARIA)	3
Austrian Albums (Ö3 Austria)	44
Belgian Albums (Ultratop Flanders)	54
Belgian Albums (Ultratop Wallonia)	139
German Albums (Offizielle Top 100)	23
Hungarian Albums (MAHASZ)	25
Irish Albums (IRMA)	1
Italian Albums (FIMI)	99
New Zealand Albums (RMNZ)	35
Portuguese Albums (AFP)	29
Scottish Albums (Official Charts)	1
Spanish Albums (Promusicae)	65
Swiss Albums (Schweizer Hitparade)	48
UK Albums (Official Charts)	1

=== Year-end charts ===
Chart (2019)	Position
Irish Albums (IRMA)	33
UK Albums (OCC)	10

== Certifications ==
Certifications for You're in My Heart
Region	Certification	Certified units/sales
United Kingdom (BPI)	Platinum	300,000^{‡}
^{‡} Sales+streaming figures based on certification alone.
