= Groove Collective =

American jazz ensemble

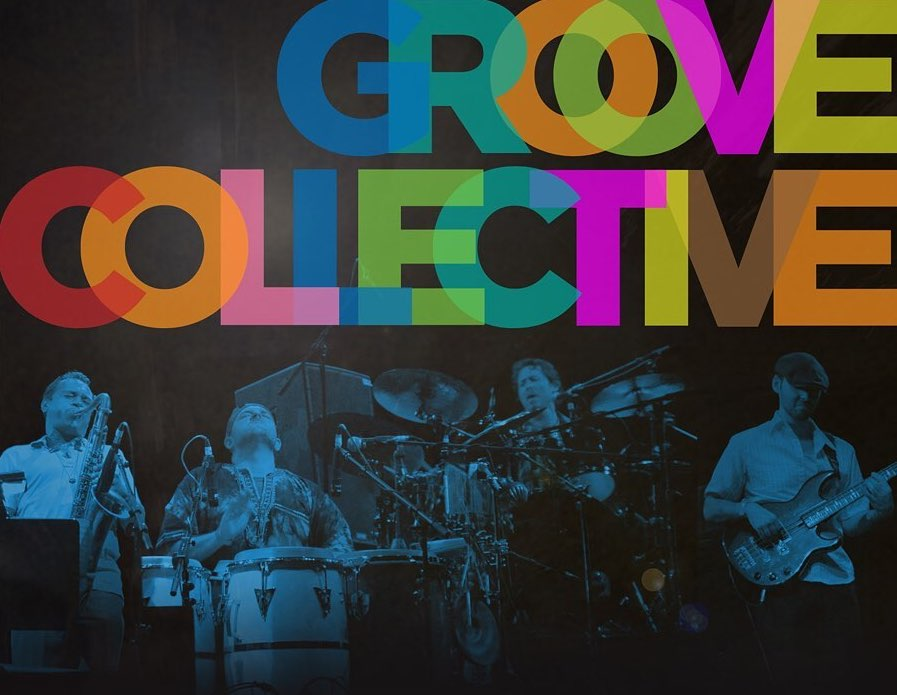
- Core four in its own image

Background information
- Origin: New York City, United States
- Genres: Jazz-funk, soul, jazz, Latin, disco
- Years active: 1990–present
- Website: www.instagram.com/groovecollectiveofficial/

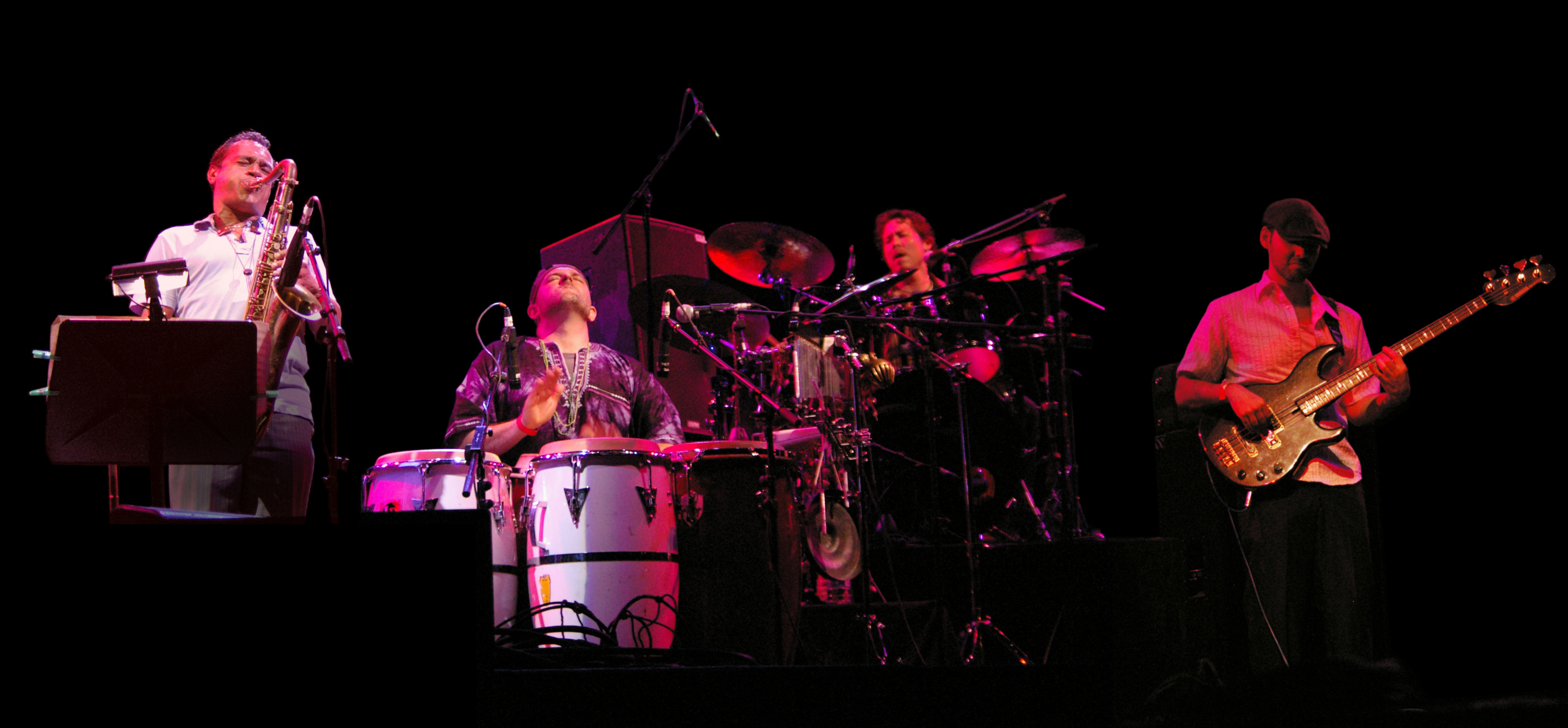
Groove Collective at Celebrate Brooklyn

Groove Collective is an American band. In 2007 they were nominated for a Grammy Award for Best Contemporary Jazz Album of the Year for the release People People Music Music on the Savoy Jazz label.

== Style ==
Groove Collective was formed in 1990. The original members were percussionist/MC Gordon "Nappy G" Clay, keyboardist Itaal Shur, Vibraphonist Bill Ware, drummer Genji Siraisi, bassist Jonathan Maron, percussionist Chris Theberge, flutist Richard Worth, saxophonist Jay Rodriguez, trumpeter Fabio Morgera, trombonist Josh Roseman.

After witnessing an early show, producer Gary Katz negotiated the band's signing to Reprise Records, and produced their eponymous debut album in 1993.

In 1994, they appeared on the Red Hot Organization's compilation album, Stolen Moments: Red Hot + Cool, alongside other prominent jazz artists, Herbie Hancock and Roy Ayers. The album, meant to raise awareness and funds in support of the AIDS epidemic in relation to the African American community, was heralded as "Album of the Year" by Time magazine.

They scored two instrumental and adult contemporary hits in 1996 with a cover of the Beatles' "I Want You (She's So Heavy)" (US Dance/Club Play #45, US Dance Maxi Singles #23) and "Lift Off" (US R&B/Hip-Hop #73).

Groove Collective's musical style reflects the wide-ranging backgrounds and interests of its individual members. Commenting on the group's 1996 release, We the People, critic Michael Casey referred to the numerous influences at work in Groove Collective's sound, specifically the presence of Afro-pop, Latin jazz, hip-hop, and traditional jazz stylings. This mix is born of the members' varying influences, including bebop, funk, old-school hip-hop and classic soul. Bassist and co-founder Jonathan Maron has acknowledged the importance of a DJ aesthetic in the music, stating that "(Groove Collective's) goal has always been to emulate the range of music a DJ plays during the course of the night at a packed club. ... A great DJ knows the songs that can ignite the room and fill the dance floor. Some of my favorite musical experiences have been in clubs, where you listen and realize how well all of these styles blend together into one big idiom of its own."

== Discography ==
- Groove Collective (Reprise/Giant Step, 1994) U.S. Jazz No. 20
- We the People (Giant Step, 1996) U.S. Jazz No. 20
- Dance of the Drunken Master (Shanachie, 1998) U.S. Jazz No. 22
- Declassified (Shanachie, 1999)
- It's All in Your Mind (Shanachie, 2001)
- Live: Brooklyn, NY 04.20.02 (Kufala, 2002)
- Live...and Hard to Find (Kufala, 2002)
- New York, NY 20.12.02 (Kufala, 2002)
- People People Music Music (Savoy, 2005)
- PS1 Warm Up: Brooklyn, NY, 7/2/2005 (Kufala, 2007)

== Band members ==
=== Current lineup ===
- Jay Rodriguez – saxophone, flute, vocals
- Jonathan Maron – bass
- Genji Siraisi – drums
- Chris Ifatoye Theberge – Conga, Bata

with

- Josh Roseman – trombone
- Marcio Garcia - keyboards
- Bryan Vargas - guitar
- Nina Creese - percussion and vocals

=== Former members ===
- Richard Worth – flute, kalimba, compositions, vocals
- Itaal Shur – keyboards, synthesizers, compositions, vocals
- Bill Ware – vibraphone, compositions, vocals
- Nappy G/Gordon Clay – percussion, talking drum, compositions, vocals
- Barney McAll - Keyboards, toys, samples, compositions
- Fabio Morgera- trumpet and flugelhorn, compositions
- David Jensen – tenor saxophone
- Mike Dillon (musician) - vibraphone

== Collaborators ==
- Adam Rogers - guitar
- Mark Anthony Jones - guitar
- Bryan Vargas - guitar
- Simone Giuliani - keyboards
- Uli Geissendorfer - keyboards
- Jonathan Crayford - keyboards
- Etienne "ATN" Stadjwyck - keyboards
- Bernie Worrell - keyboards
- Victor Axlerod - keyboards
- Eric Lane - keyboards
- Ben Stivers - keyboards
- Pablo Vergara - keyboards
- Cucho Valdez
- David Fiuczynski
- Curtis Fowlkes - trombone
- Fred Wesley - trombone
- Reut Regev - trombone
- Peter Apfelbaum - saxophones
- Troy Simms - saxophones
- Clark Gayton - trombone
- Jack Walrath - trumpet
- DJ Jazzy Nice - DJ
- Wayne "Smash" Hunter - DJ
- DJ Nicodemus
- Eric Kupper
- Salam Remi
- Diosa Gary - vocals
- MC Babee Power - vocals
- Vinia Mojica - vocals
- Alien Nation - vocals
- Lucy Woodward - vocals
- Malik Work - vocals
- Hiroyuki Sanada - production and mixology
- Uncle Fester - live production
