= Blood Red Roses =

Studio album by Rod Stewart
- Released: 28 September 2018
- Studios: The Celtic House (Los Angeles, California); Satinwood Studio (Santa Clarita, California); The Studio (Palm Beach, Florida)
- Genres: Rock; Pop
- Length: 51:32
- Labels: Decca; Republic
- Producers: Rod Stewart; Kevin Savigar

Rod Stewart chronology
Another Country (2015)	Blood Red Roses (2018)	You're in My Heart: Rod Stewart with the Royal Philharmonic Orchestra (2019)

Singles from Blood Red Roses
- 1. "Didn't I" Released: 19 July 2018; 2. "Look in Her Eyes" Released: 7 September 2018; 3. "Grace" Released: 21 September 2018

Blood Red Roses is the 30th studio album by British singer-songwriter Rod Stewart. It was released on 28 September 2018 through Decca Records and Republic Records. It was produced by Stewart and Kevin Savigar. Covers on the album include versions of Jim McCann's "Grace", the Kingston Trio's "It Was a Very Good Year" and Hambone Willie Newbern's "Rollin' and Tumblin'".

== Track listing ==
No.	Title	Writer(s)	Length
1.	"Look in Her Eyes"	Rod Stewart; Kevin Savigar	4:12
2.	"Hole in My Heart"	Stewart; Savigar	3:27
3.	"Farewell"	Stewart; Savigar	4:16
4.	"Didn't I" (featuring Bridget Cady)	Stewart; Savigar	4:01
5.	"Blood Red Roses"	Stewart; Savigar; Ewan MacColl	3:41
6.	"Grace"	Frank O'Meara; Sean O'Meara	4:53
7.	"Give Me Love"	Stewart; Savigar	4:08
8.	"Rest of My Life"	Stewart; Savigar	3:28
9.	"Rollin' & Tumblin'"	Hambone Willie Newbern; Sunnyland Slim	3:38
10.	"Julia"	Stewart; Jon McLaughlin; Dave Thomas Junior	3:36
11.	"Honey Gold"	Stewart; Emerson Swinford	4:44
12.	"Vegas Shuffle"	Stewart; Swinford	3:47
13.	"Cold Old London"	Stewart; Savigar	3:42
Total length:			51:32

Deluxe version bonus tracks
No.	Title	Writer(s)	Length
14.	"Who Designed the Snowflake"	Paddy McAloon	3:08
15.	"It Was a Very Good Year"	Ervin Drake	5:07
16.	"I Don't Want to Get Married"	Stewart; Savigar	3:14

Japanese edition bonus tracks
No.	Title	Writer(s)	Length
17.	"Priceless"	Rod Stewart; Kevin Savigar; Emerson Swinford	3:33
18.	"Da Ya Think I'm Sexy?" (featuring DNCE)	Rod Stewart; Carmine Appice; Duane Hitchings; Rami Yacoub; Kristoffer Fodgelmark; Albin Nedler	3:40
Total length:			70:24

Target deluxe version bonus tracks
No.	Title	Writer(s)	Length
14.	"Who Designed the Snowflake"	Paddy McAloon	3:08
15.	"Priceless"	Rod Stewart; Kevin Savigar; Emerson Swinford	3:33
16.	"It Was a Very Good Year"	Ervin Drake	5:07
17.	"I Don't Want to Get Married"	Stewart; Savigar	3:14

== Personnel ==
- Rod Stewart – vocals
- Kevin Savigar – keyboards, programming
- Chuck Kentis – programming (9)
- Emerson Swinford – guitars (1–7, 10–12, 16), bass (5, 11, 12), electric guitars (9)
- Don Kirkpatrick – electric guitars (9)
- Conrad Korsch – bass (2, 5, 9)
- David Palmer – drums (2, 5, 8, 9)
- Julia Thornton – tambourine (1, 4, 5, 7, 8)
- Jimmy Roberts – saxophones (2, 7, 17)
- Nick Lane – trombone (2, 7, 17)
- Anne King – trumpet (1, 2, 7, 17)
- J'Anna Jacoby – violin (2, 3, 5, 6, 9)
- Adrianna Thuber – violin (5, 9)
- Bridget Cady – backing vocals (1, 3, 6, 7, 9, 11, 12, 17), additional vocals (4, 13)
- Felicia Glissom – backing vocals (2, 7, 8, 11, 17)
- Pam Olivia – backing vocals (2, 7, 8, 11, 17)
- Daryl Phinnessee – backing vocals (2, 7, 11, 13)
- Will Wheaton – backing vocals (2, 7, 11, 13)
- Fred White – backing vocals (2, 7, 11, 13)
- Becca Kotte – backing vocals (3, 4, 6, 7, 9, 12)
- Di Reed – backing vocals (3, 4, 6, 7, 9, 11, 12, 17)
- Pastor James Carrington – backing vocals (5)
- Paul Freeman – backing vocals (5, 7, 11)
- Casey Shea – backing vocals (5)
- Brent Jones – backing vocals (7, 11)
- Taylr Lindersmith – backing vocals (11, 17)

=== Production ===
- Rod Stewart – producer
- Kevin Savigar – producer, recording, mixing
- Patrick Logue – recording assistant, production coordinator
- Bernie Grundman – mastering at Bernie Grundman Mastering (Hollywood, California)
- Ryan Rogers – art direction, design
- Daniel Egneus – cover illustration
- Rankin – photography
- Penny Lancaster – photography (pages 9 & 18)
- Arnold Stiefel – management
- Lotus Davidson – management

== Commercial performance ==
Stewart first hit number one in UK with his third studio album Every Picture Tells A Story in 1971, and 47 years later, the album claimed the top spot with over 41,000 combined sales. In its second week it remained at number three with 12,921 sales.

== Charts ==
=== Weekly charts ===
Chart (2018)	Peak position
Australian Albums (ARIA)	15
Austrian Albums (Ö3 Austria)	18
Belgian Albums (Ultratop Flanders)	23
Belgian Albums (Ultratop Wallonia)	66
Canadian Albums (Billboard)	49
Czech Albums (ČNS IFPI)	31
Dutch Albums (Album Top 100)	51
German Albums (Offizielle Top 100)	12
Irish Albums (IRMA)	2
Japanese Albums (Oricon)	117
Scottish Albums (Official Charts)	1
Spanish Albums (PROMUSICAE)	24
Swedish Albums (Sverigetopplistan)	9
Swiss Albums (Schweizer Hitparade)	18
UK Albums (Official Charts)	1
US Billboard 200	62

=== Year-end charts ===
Chart (2018)	Position
UK Albums (OCC)	15

== Certifications ==
Region	Certification	Certified units/sales
United Kingdom (BPI)	Gold	146,010
