= Hooked! =

Studio album by Lucy Woodward
- Released: June 15, 2010
- Recorded: 2009–2010
- Genre: Pop; jazz; blues
- Length: 46:23
- Label: Verve
- Producer: Tony Visconti; Dan Petty; Tim K; Itaal Shur; Justin Stanley

Lucy Woodward chronology
| Lucy Woodward Is...Hot & Bothered (2007) | Hooked! (2010) |

Singles from Hooked!
- 1. "Slow Recovery" Released: 2010; 2. "Ragdoll" Released: 2010

Hooked! is the third studio album by American singer-songwriter Lucy Woodward. It was released on June 15, 2010 as her debut album for Verve Records. The set's first single, "Slow Recovery" was released to iTunes on May 4, 2010.

The album includes nine original songs and three covers versions ("Sans Souci", "I Wan'na Be Like You (The Monkey Song)" and "Stardust"). Two of the originals ("Slow Recovery" and "Too Much to Live For") had previously appeared on Woodward's second album Lucy Woodward Is...Hot & Bothered but were reworked for this release with different vocals and arrangements. The iTunes version also includes another cover, "Fashion", originally recorded by David Bowie for his album Scary Monsters (And Super Creeps).

== Track listing ==
| No. | Title | Writer(s) | Producer(s) | Length |
|---|---|---|---|---|
| 1. | "He Got Away" | Lucy Woodward; Michelle R. Lewis; Daniel Petty | Tony Visconti | 3:55 |
| 2. | "Sans Souci" | Peggy Lee; Francis J. Burke | Visconti | 4:06 |
| 3. | "Purple Heart" | Woodward; Michael Ripoll | Visconti | 4:09 |
| 4. | "I Wan'na Be Like You (The Monkey Song)" | Richard Sherman | Visconti | 4:16 |
| 5. | "Another Woman" | Nellie McKay | Visconti | 3:36 |
| 6. | "Babies" | Woodward; Lewis; Petty | Petty | 3:59 |
| 7. | "Slow Recovery" | Woodward; James Michael; Stuart Brawley | Tim K | 4:37 |
| 8. | "Ragdoll" | Woodward; Itaal Shur; Steven Sater | Shur | 4:01 |
| 9. | "This Empty Room" | Woodward; Lewis; Petty; Justin Mitchell Stanley | Stanley | 3:48 |
| 10. | "Too Much to Live For" | Woodward; Shur; Kvasnosky | Visconti | 3:51 |
| 11. | "Leave It to You" | Woodward; Lewis; Petty; Stanley | Stanley | 3:32 |
| 12. | "Stardust" | Hoagy Carmichael; Mitchell Parish | Visconti | 2:33 |

iTunes Store bonus track
| No. | Title | Writer(s) | Length |
|---|---|---|---|
| 13. | "Fashion" | David Bowie | 3:41 |

== Singles ==
- "Slow Recovery" (2010)
- "Ragdoll" (2010)
