= Time (Rod Stewart album) =

Studio album by Rod Stewart
- Released: 3 May 2013
- Recorded: April 2011–January 2013
- Studios: Satinwood Studio (Santa Clarita, California); The Celtic Place (Los Angeles, California); Sunset Sound Recorders (Hollywood, California); The Bridge Recording (Glendale, California); Echo Beach Studios (Jupiter, Florida); RAK Studios (London, UK)
- Genre: Rock
- Length: 50:10
- Labels: Capitol; Decca; UCJ
- Producers: Rod Stewart; Kevin Savigar (co-producer)

Rod Stewart chronology
| Merry Christmas, Baby (2012) | Time (2013) | Another Country (2015) |

Singles from Time
- 1. "She Makes Me Happy" Released: 19 March 2013; 2. "It's Over" Released: 19 March 2013; 3. "Brighton Beach" Released: 5 May 2013; 4. "Can't Stop Me Now" Released: 4 September 2013

Time is the twenty-eighth studio album by British singer and songwriter Rod Stewart, released on 3 May 2013 in the UK, on 7 May in the US and Canada, and on 8 May in Japan under the title Time: Toki no Tabibito (タイム~時の旅人~). A rock album of his own original material, it marked a return to songwriting after what Stewart termed "a dark period of twenty years"; he said that writing his autobiography gave him the impetus to write music again.

The album entered the top 10 in the US and entered the UK Albums Chart at No. 1, setting a new British record for the longest gap between chart-topping albums by an artist, as his last studio album to reach the top spot was A Night on the Town in 1976. The album was certified platinum in the UK on 16 August 2013 and double-platinum on 29 December 2017. Overall, the album was the No. 7 best-selling album of 2013 in the UK. In the United States, the album has sold 141,000 copies as of September 2015.

== Singles and other releases ==
"It's Over" was the album's lead European single and it joined BBC Radio 2's playlist in April 2013 and Kingstown Radio's new music file; the single peaked at No. 91 on the UK Singles Chart. In North America, the album's lead single, "She Makes Me Happy", peaked at No. 12 on the Billboard Adult Contemporary chart; it also peaked at No. 32 on Billboard's Japan Hot 100. Both singles were accompanied by music videos directed by Cameron Duddy. The third single, "Brighton Beach", followed shortly after, with the music video directed by Zach Merck. "Beautiful Morning" was originally available by download in 2012 via a code found inside the CD booklet for Stewart's Christmas album Merry Christmas, Baby, albeit differing from the final mix included on the Time album.

In the UK, a deluxe 2-disc version of the album was released on 2 December 2013. It contains live tracks from Stewart's 2013 performance at The Troubadour, West Hollywood as well as all the bonus tracks previously available on the UK and US/Canada deluxe editions of the album; the live tracks include six songs from the Time album as well as previous hits. Ahead of the release of the 2-disc version of the album, "Can't Stop Me Now" was released as a single and peaked at No. 22 on the US Billboard Adult Contemporary chart and at No. 199 on the UK Singles Chart. "Sexual Religion" was also released as a single in the US, where it peaked at No. 45 on Billboard's "Dance/Club Songs" chart.

== Track listing ==
| No. | Title | Writer(s) | Length |
|---|---|---|---|
| 1. | "She Makes Me Happy" | Rod Stewart; Chuck Kentis; Don Kirkpatrick; Conrad Korsch; David Palmer; Paul Warren | 3:44 |
| 2. | "Can't Stop Me Now" | Stewart; Kevin Savigar | 4:26 |
| 3. | "It's Over" | Stewart; Savigar; John 5 | 4:19 |
| 4. | "Brighton Beach" | Stewart; Jim Cregan | 4:25 |
| 5. | "Beautiful Morning" | Stewart; Savigar; Kentis; Kirkpatrick; Korsch; Palmer; Warren | 3:58 |
| 6. | "Live the Life" | Stewart; Kentis; Kirkpatrick; Jessica Rousseau | 4:26 |
| 7. | "Finest Woman" | Stewart; Savigar; Emerson Swinford | 3:54 |
| 8. | "Time" | Stewart; Savigar; Swinford | 4:26 |
| 9. | "Picture in a Frame" | Tom Waits; Kathleen Brennan | 2:53 |
| 10. | "Sexual Religion" | Stewart; Savigar | 4:45 |
| 11. | "Make Love to Me Tonight" | Stewart; Kentis; Kirkpatrick; Korsch; Palmer; Warren | 3:44 |
| 12. | "Pure Love" | Stewart; Savigar | 5:10 |

UK and iTunes exclusive bonus tracks
| No. | Title | Writer(s) | Length |
|---|---|---|---|
| 13. | "Corrina Corrina" | Traditional | 3:26 |
| 14. | "Legless" | Stewart; Kentis; Kirkpatrick; Korsch; Palmer; Warren | 3:50 |
| 15. | "Love Has No Pride" | Eric Kaz; Libby Titus | 4:04 |

Target exclusive bonus tracks
| No. | Title | Writer(s) | Length |
|---|---|---|---|
| 13. | "Here Comes the Night" | Bert Berns | 3:28 |
| 14. | "Cold Water" | Waits; Brennan | 3:59 |
| 15. | "Shake Your Moneymaker" | Elmore James | 2:40 |

UK deluxe edition bonus disc tracks: Live from the Troubadour, West Hollywood 2013
| No. | Title | Writer(s) | Length |
|---|---|---|---|
| 1. | "Can't Stop Me Now" | Stewart; Savigar | 4:14 |
| 2. | "Forever Young" | Stewart; Savigar; Cregan; Bob Dylan | 4:36 |
| 3. | "It's Over" | Stewart; Savigar; John 5 | 4:43 |
| 4. | "Rhythm of My Heart" | Marc Jordan; John Capek | 6:11 |
| 5. | "Finest Woman" | Stewart; Savigar; Swinford | 4:19 |
| 6. | "You Wear It Well" | Stewart; Martin Quittenton | 3:42 |
| 7. | "She Makes Me Happy" | Stewart; Kentis; Kirkpatrick; Korsch; Palmer; Warren | 3:55 |
| 8. | "Have I Told You Lately" | Van Morrison | 4:47 |
| 9. | "Brighton Beach" | Stewart; Cregan | 4:47 |
| 10. | "Sexual Religion" | Stewart; Savigar | 5:16 |

== Personnel ==
Musicians

- Rod Stewart – lead vocals

Standard and UK bonus tracks

- Kevin Savigar – keyboards (1–3, 5, 7, 10, 12), programming (1, 2, 5, 7, 10), string arrangements and conductor (3, 12), celesta (6), acoustic piano (12)
- Chuck Kentis – keyboards (3, 6, 10, 14, 15), guitars (3), string arrangements (3, 4), accordion (4), programming (6), harmonica (6), acoustic piano (9, 15), Hammond B3 organ (11), organ (13)
- Emerson Swinford – guitars (1–3, 5, 7, 8, 10), mandolin (1, 5), dulcimer (1), acoustic guitar (6), electric guitar (6), slide guitar (11)
- Jim Cregan – acoustic guitar (4)
- Don Kirkpatrick – electric 12-string guitar (5), acoustic guitar (6, 9, 13, 15), guitars (11, 14)
- Paul Warren – electric guitar (9), guitars (11, 14), acoustic guitar (13)
- Conrad Korsch – bass (3–5, 8, 9, 11, 13–15)
- Kenny Aronoff – drums (1, 5), tambourine (1)
- David Palmer – drums (3, 9, 11, 13, 14)
- Matt O'Connor – maracas (1, 7, 8), shaker (1), tambourine (6, 7)
- J'Anna Jacoby – violin (1, 6, 11), strings (4, 9), mandolin (6)
- Jimmy Roberts – saxophone (5, 7, 10, 14)
- Nick Lane – trombone (7, 14), horn arrangements (14)
- Lee Thornburg – trumpet (7, 14)
- Jimmie Wood – harmonica (13)
- Sandy Chilla – backing vocals (1, 2, 6, 11)
- Sharlotte Gibson – backing vocals (1, 11)
- Di Reed – backing vocals (1, 3, 5–8, 10, 11, 14)
- Lucy Woodward – backing vocals (1, 3, 5–8, 10)
- Bridget Anne Cady – backing vocals (5, 10)
- Kim Johnson – backing vocals (5–7, 10, 14)
- Angie Fisher – backing vocals (8)
- Angela Michael – backing vocals (11, 15)

Target exclusive bonus track credits

- Chuck Kentis – keyboards (13, 14)
- Don Kirkpatrick – guitars (13, 14), electric guitar (15)
- Paul Warren – guitars (13, 14), electric guitar (15), dobro (15)
- Conrad Korsch – bass
- David Palmer – drums
- Nick Lane – tuba (14)
- J'Anna Jacoby – violin (14)
- Jimmie Wood – harmonica (15)
- Sandy Chilla – backing vocals (13)
- Sharlotte Gibson – backing vocals (13, 14)
- Di Reed – backing vocals (13, 14)
- Kim Johnson – backing vocals (14)

=== Production ===
- Rod Stewart – producer
- Kevin Savigar – co-producer (1–3, 5–12), additional production (4, 9, 11), engineer, mixing, additional production (Target bonus tracks)
- Chuck Kentis – co-producer (3, 9, 11), additional production (4, 5, 10), co-producer (Target bonus tracks)
- Jim Cregan – co-producer (4)
- Tom Weir – additional engineer
- Paul Warren – lead vocal recording
- Dave Blanco – string recording (3, 4, 12)
- Bernie Grundman – mastering at Bernie Grundman Mastering (Hollywood, California)
- Lotus Donovan – A&R administrator, additional photography
- Julian Peploe – art direction, design
- Penny Lancaster – cover photography, principal photography
- Cammy Kinney – additional photography
- Arnold Stiefel for Stiefel Entertainment – management

== Charts and certifications ==
=== Weekly charts ===
| Chart (2013) | Peak position |
|---|---|
| Australian Albums (ARIA) | 6 |
| Austrian Albums (Ö3 Austria) | 7 |
| Belgian Albums (Ultratop Flanders) | 45 |
| Belgian Albums (Ultratop Wallonia) | 52 |
| Canadian Albums (Billboard) | 4 |
| Danish Albums (Hitlisten) | 17 |
| Dutch Albums (Album Top 100) | 34 |
| German Albums (Offizielle Top 100) | 4 |
| Hungarian Albums (MAHASZ) | 25 |
| Irish Albums (Official Charts) | 3 |
| Italian Albums (FIMI) | 29 |
| Japanese Albums (Oricon) | 25 |
| New Zealand Albums (RMNZ) | 5 |
| Norwegian Albums (VG-lista) | 25 |
| Polish Albums (ZPAV) | 12 |
| Scottish Albums (Official Charts) | 1 |
| South African Albums (RISA) | 20 |
| Spanish Albums (Promusicae) | 16 |
| Swedish Albums (Sverigetopplistan) | 7 |
| Swiss Albums (Schweizer Hitparade) | 12 |
| UK Albums (Official Charts) | 1 |
| US Billboard 200 | 7 |

=== Year-end charts ===
| Chart (2013) | Position |
|---|---|
| UK Albums (OCC) | 7 |

=== Certifications ===
| Region | Certification | Certified units/sales |
|---|---|---|
| Canada (Music Canada) | Gold | 40,000^{^} |
| United Kingdom (BPI) | 2× Platinum | 600,000^{‡} |
^{^} Shipments figures based on certification alone.^{‡} Sales+streaming figures based on certification alone.
