= Julia Thornton =

British harpist

Julia Thornton is a professional harpist, who to date has released two albums: Harpistry (2003) and Eye of the Storm (2004).

== Musical life and career ==
Julia Thornton began to play the harp aged 11. Having wanted to do so since the age of three, her parents initially managed to stave off her persistence, allowing her piano lessons at the age of 9. Eighteen months later, having taken well to the piano, she was allowed to have her first harp lesson.

Beginning on an Irish instrument called the clarsach (an instrument that is smaller than a concert harp and doesn't have its pedal mechanism), Thornton was initially taught by a local teacher who had to return to her native Czechoslovakia after a year. After this, she was taught by Daphne Boden (who eventually became her professor at the Royal Academy of Music). Within a year, Boden asked Thornton's parents if they would buy her a concert harp – a huge financial investment. Thornton's first harp belonged to Boden – a Japanese instrument called an Ahomaya.

Thornton extended her studies by attending the Junior Department of the Royal College of Music on Saturdays, where she began also to learn percussion. At this time she also became a member of the National Youth Orchestra.

Having won a scholarship to the Royal Academy of Music, she studied there between 1990 and 1995, winning many prizes for her harp-playing (including the Julia Leney and Renata Schefelstein harp awards, and both the harp prizes at the Royal Overseas League competition). She was also awarded the Mathias Prize for the best performance of his Santa Fe Suite at the International Harp Competition in Cardiff. After completing her studies at the Academy, Thornton's work consisted of a mixture of teaching, orchestral and solo work. She performed with a wide variety of orchestras and opera and ballet companies, and gave recitals including performances at the Cambridge, Beaumaris and Cheltenham music festivals. She also joined the panel of Yehudi Menuhin's "Live Music Now!", which enables young musicians to perform in various communities around the country, such as in schools, day-care centres, homes for the elderly, homes for those suffering from Alzheimers or dementia, prisons and young offenders' institutes.

Thornton's main breakthrough came at a yoga demo in 1999, where she was playing the harp and was spotted by Clare Davies, wife of Bryan Ferry's producer, Rhett Davies. Following an audition, she began working with Bryan Ferry, performing on the harp and percussion instruments on his "As Time Goes By" tour, which comprised a collection of 1930s standards such as the title track. In 2001 she was asked to join the Roxy Music reunion tour – a tour that involved 50 days of percussion playing only. Despite her love for the harp, Thornton took this opportunity. The tour involved visits to Australia and Japan, and playing in some of the world's major venues, such as Wembley Arena.

The seeds of her first album, "Harpistry", were sown during her involvement with a mediaeval instrumental group, Arcana Mundi, a concept dreamed up by Craig Leon, who would later become her producer. Thornton signed a deal with EMI in 2002, and between trips abroad with Bryan Ferry, she sourced the material for her first album, with help from Leon. She recorded "Harpistry" in the Netherlands in 2003, before going to Brazil on another Bryan Ferry tour. On 1 September 2005, www.PlaybillArts.com reported that Harpistry charted at no. 13 on the Billboard Classical chart. Thornton released her second album, "Eye of the Storm", on her own label, Crossways Records, due to frustrations with EMI.

In spring 2007, Thornton became a member of a new band, The Metaphors, which featured Roxy Music founding members Andy MacKay and Paul Thompson on reeds and drums respectively, together with Hazel Mills on Keyboards and T J Allen on guitar and effects. That summer, they recorded their first album. The six-song collection called London! Paris! New York! Rome! was released on iTunes in March 2009, and became available as a disk from their website a month later. To date The Metaphors have played a limited number of live dates.

In June and July 2009, Julia returned to her percussion and harp duties for the 30th anniversary tour of Jeff Wayne's Musical Version of The War of the World for a 21-concert tour of U.K. and Europe.

According to her webpage, Julia has plans to go into the studio and record her own music and record with members of Lunar Dunes, a band that she has sat in with. Julia is also following up on her interest in yoga by taking classes towards becoming a yoga instructor.

== Personal life ==
Julia grew up in Ipswich. Commenting on her wide range of musical tastes from Mahler to Joni Mitchell, she said "My parents were hippies!"

Her precise date of birth is not generally known, but FreeBMD states that she was born in the first quarter of 1972.

Julia is married to fellow Rod Stewart band member and guitarist Don Kirkpatrick.

== Video ==
Bryan Ferry (2000) Live at the Grand Rex
Roxy Music (2001) Live at the Apollo
Konixxtreffen 2002 Concert (extra on Bryan Ferry: The Bete Noire Tour 2008 DVD reissue)
Classic FM TV Greatest Hits Vol.1
Live 8 (2005) with Roxy Music
Jeff Wayne's Musical Version of The War of the Worlds – Live on Stage (2006)

== Recordings ==
Roxy Music (2001) Live
Susheela Raman (2001) Salt Rain
Bryan Ferry (2002) Frantic
Julia Thornton (2003) Harpistry *
Julia Thornton (2004) Eye of the Storm
The Bench Connection (2007) Around the House in 80 Days
Athena (2008) Breathe With Me
Andy MacKay & The Metaphors (2009) London! Paris! New York! Rome!

- Tracks from Harpistry appear on various EMI compilation disks.

== Tours ==
Bryan Ferry As Time Goes By 1999–2000 Harp/Percussion
Roxy Music Reunion Tour 2001–2002 Percussion/Keyboards
Bryan Ferry Frantic Tour 2002 Harp/Percussion
Roxy Music Summer Festivals 2005 Percussion/Keyboards
Jeff Wayne's War of the Worlds 2006 Harp/Percussion
Russell Watson Spring Tour 2007 Harp/Percussion
Jeff Wayne's War of the Worlds Australia Sept 2007 Harp/Percussion
Jeff Wayne's War of the Worlds Re-Invasion of England Dec. 2007 Harp/Percussion
Andy MacKay & The Metaphors 2008 Harp
Jeff Wayne's War of the Worlds 30th Anniversary Tour 2009 Harp/Percussion
Jeff Wayne's War of the Worlds – The New Generation Tour 2012 Harp/Percussion
Rod Stewart 2013/2016/2017 Harp/Percussion
