= Penny Lancaster =

British model and television personality (born 1971)

Lady Stewart
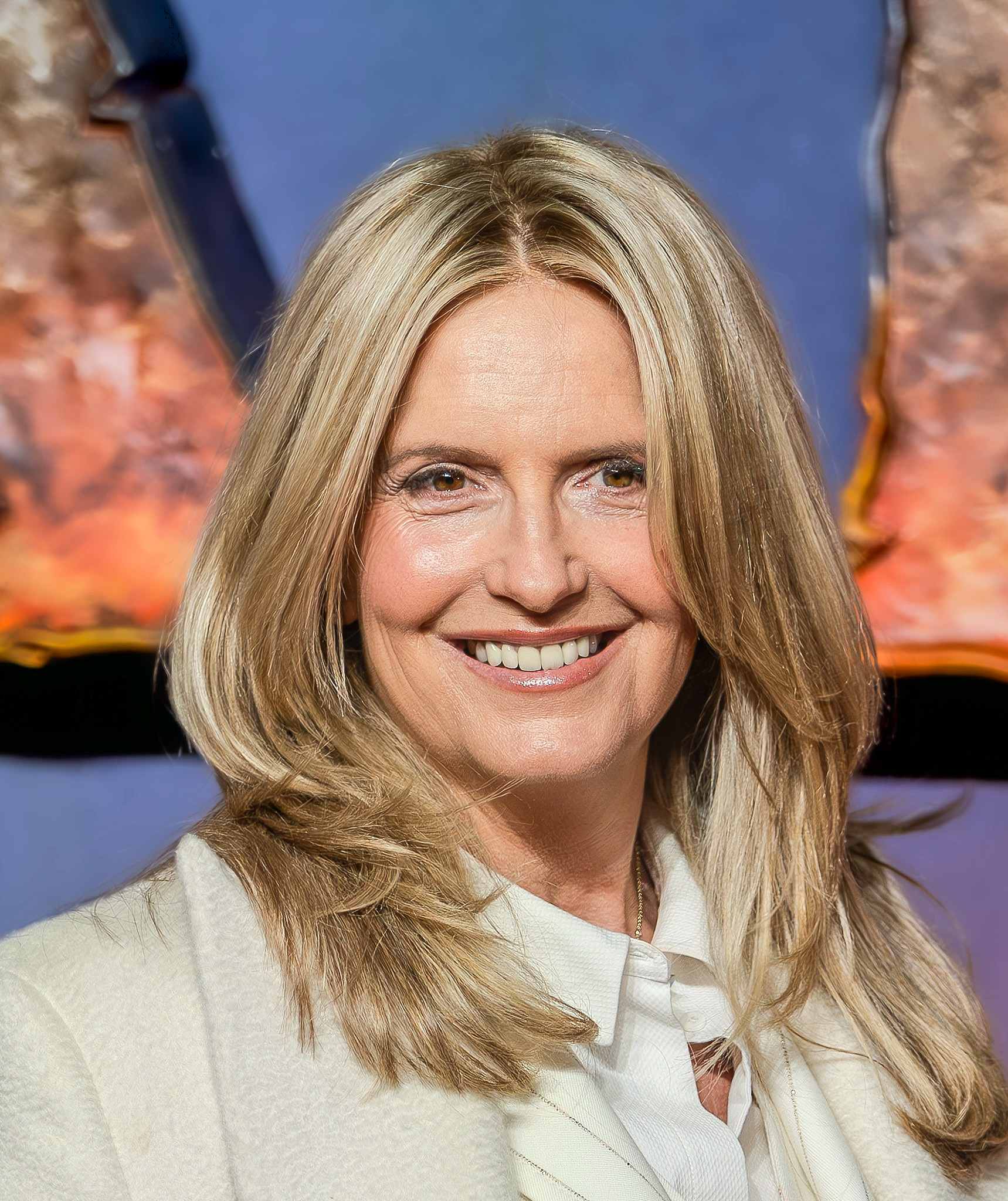
- Lancaster in 2025
- Born: Penelope Claire Lancaster; 15 March 1971 (age 55); Redbridge, Essex, England
- Occupations: Model; television personality
- Spouse: Rod Stewart (m. 2007)
- Children: 2
- Relatives: Kimberly Stewart (step-daughter); Ruby Stewart (step-daughter)
- Modelling information
- Height: 185 cm (6 ft 1 in)
- Hair colour: Blonde
- Police career
- Branch: Special Constabulary
- Service years: City of London Police, 2020–present
- Rank: Special Constable

Penelope Claire Lancaster, Lady Stewart (born 15 March 1971) is an English model and television personality. She has been married to rock singer Rod Stewart since 2007. In 2014, she joined the ITV lunchtime show Loose Women. She appeared as a panellist from 2014–2019 returned in 2021 and returned permanently from 2024 onwards.

== Early life ==
Lancaster was born in Redbridge, Essex, England, on 15 March 1971, to Graham and Sally and has a brother named Oliver, born two years later. She grew up in the Ilford suburb of Barkingside and in 1986 her family moved to Chigwell. At the age of six, Lancaster took up dance, including tap, ballet and modern. At 16, she gave up because of her height and decided that aerobics would better suit her frame, and six years later she became a certified fitness trainer. It was during this time that she was spotted by a model scout, who suggested she should consider a career in modelling.

== Career ==
=== Early career ===
Throughout the 1990s, Lancaster was in a relationship with city trader Mickey Sloan. They lived in Bermuda from 1996 to 1998 but separated in 1999.

Around this time, Lancaster began taking photography classes.

=== Ultimo ===
In 2002, Lancaster signed up to be the face of designer lingerie brand Ultimo for £200,000. After two years in the role, her contract was not renewed. She was replaced in the role by Rod Stewart's ex-wife Rachel Hunter. Lancaster soon signed a deal with another top modelling agency, Elite New York. Ultimo's decision to replace her, dubbed Bra Wars by the British press, was seen as a publicity stunt, which infuriated Stewart, who described Ultimo's founder Michelle Mone as "manipulative". However, two of Stewart's daughters—Kimberly and Ruby—have since modelled for Ultimo.

=== Strictly Come Dancing ===
Lancaster was one of fourteen celebrities taking part in the fifth series of Strictly Come Dancing in 2007. In week 4, she was revealed as one of the bottom two participants. She and her dancing partner Ian Waite were in the week six dance-off with Matt Di Angelo and were voted off.

Performances

Week #	Dance	Judges' score				Result
Week #	Dance	Horwood	Phillips	Goodman	Tonioli	Result
1	Swing					Group Performance - Not Judged
2	Quickstep	8	8	8	9	Safe
3	Jive	5	6	7	7	Safe
4	Samba	8	7	9	8	Bottom Two
5	Foxtrot	9	8	9	9	Safe
6	Salsa	6	6	7	6	Eliminated

=== Loose Women ===
On 15 September 2014, Lancaster was billed as an occasional panellist on the lunchtime TV chat show Loose Women. She made four subsequent appearances during her first series. Through series 20 and 21 Lancaster started appearing on the show more regularly, usually twice per month. However, from series 22, she returned to appearing much more infrequently, making a total of six appearances. This was followed by a further ten appearances in series 23 and four in series 24. In series 25, she appeared more frequently and was a regular panellist. After taking a break from the show, she returned in 2025.

=== Other television work ===
In January 2018, Lancaster participated in And They're Off! in aid of Sport Relief.

In January 2019, she appeared in an episode of Celebrity Catchphrase. In February 2019, she appeared in Famous and Fighting Crime alongside fellow celebrities Jamie Laing, Katie Piper, Sandi Bogle and Marcus Brigstocke on Channel 4. In 2021, Lancaster was a competitor on BBC's Celebrity MasterChef. She made it as far as her quarter final, losing out to Melanie Sykes and Megan McKenna. In 2024, Lancaster's husband, Rod Stewart, accused MasterChef host Gregg Wallace of humiliating Lancaster when she appeared on the show and arranging for the incidents when this happened to be "cut" from the aired programme. The accusation was made in the context of a BBC announcement of an enquiry into allegations against Wallace of sexual harassment of women on the MasterChef set.

In June 2024, she appeared on Michael McIntyre's The Wheel.

=== Police work ===
In 2020, after appearing on Channel 4's Famous and Fighting Crime, Lancaster joined the City of London Police as a volunteer special constable. In April 2021, she completed her training to become a special police constable and is now fully qualified. She was on policing duties during the Queen’s funeral and the coronation of King Charles III.

== Personal life ==
In 1999, Lancaster met singer Rod Stewart when he agreed to let her take photos of him on tour. A romance soon developed and they began a seven-year courtship. Lancaster gave birth to their first child on 27 November 2005. Lancaster and Stewart married on 16 June 2007 at La Cervara near Portofino, Italy. On 17 February 2011, it was announced that Lancaster had given birth to their second child (Stewart's eighth) on 16 February. She lives in Sheering, Essex.

Lancaster is an ambassador for Penny for London, a charity helping young people escape poverty, supported by Northern & Shell, the former parent company of the Daily Express, Goldman Sachs, Barclaycard and VISA. She is also a vice-president of the Royal National Institute of Blind People. She is also Patron of the UK Care Of Police Survivors charity.

At the age of 46, Lancaster was diagnosed with dyslexia.
