= Asylum Years =

Compilation album by Tom Waits
- Released: 1986
- Recorded: 1973–1980
- Genre: Rock
- Length: 70:25
- Label: Asylum

Professional ratings
Review scores
Source	Rating
AllMusic	4.5/5 stars

Asylum Years is the second "best of" compilation covering Tom Waits' Asylum Records years. The album retreads more than half of the track-listing of Anthology of Tom Waits.

While never officially released in the US during its initial run, the compilation is readily available on the iTunes Store since Anti- Records acquired the rights to Waits's Asylum catalog in 2017.

== Track listing (CD version) ==
Songs written by Tom Waits, except where noted.

1. "Diamonds on My Windshield" - 3:08
  - Previously released on The Heart of Saturday Night
2. "(Looking For) The Heart of Saturday Night" - 3:55
  - Previously released on The Heart of Saturday Night
3. "Martha" - 4:29
  - Previously released on Closing Time
4. "The Ghosts of Saturday Night (After Hours at Napoleone's Pizza House)" - 3:14
  - Previously released on The Heart of Saturday Night
5. "Grapefruit Moon" - 4:49
  - Previously released on Closing Time
6. "Small Change" - 5:05
  - Previously released on Small Change
7. "Burma Shave" - 6:33
  - Previously released on Foreign Affairs
8. "I Never Talk to Strangers" - 3:41
  - Previously released on Foreign Affairs
9. "Tom Traubert's Blues" - 6:34
  - Previously released on Small Change
10. "Blue Valentines" - 5:54
  - Previously released on Blue Valentine
11. "Potter's Field" (Bob Alcivar, Waits) - 8:44
  - Previously released on Foreign Affairs
12. "Kentucky Avenue" - 4:51
  - Previously released on Blue Valentine
13. "Somewhere (From West Side Story)" (Leonard Bernstein, Stephen Sondheim) - 3:53
  - Previously released on Blue Valentine
14. "Ruby's Arms" - 5:35
  - Previously released on Heartattack and Vine
