= Used Songs 1973–1980 =

Compilation album by Tom Waits
- Released: October 23, 2001.
- Label: Rhino Records
- Producer: Bones Howe

Used Songs 1973–1980 is a compilation of songs from Tom Waits's Asylum Records years.

== Track listing ==
Songs written by Tom Waits

1. "Heartattack and Vine" - 4:44
  - from Heartattack and Vine (1980)
  - Tom Waits - vocals, electric guitar
  - Larry Taylor - bass
  - John Thomassie - drums
  - Plas Johnson - tenor and baritone saxes
2. "Eggs and Sausage (In a Cadillac With Susan Michelson)" - 4:23
  - from Nighthawks at the Diner (1975)
  - Tom Waits - vocals, piano
  - Mike Melvoin - electric piano
  - Jim Hughart - bass
  - Bill Goodwin - drums
  - Pete Christlieb - tenor sax
3. "A Sight for Sore Eyes" - 4:41
  - from Foreign Affairs (1977)
  - Tom Waits - vocals, piano
  - Jim Hughart - bass
4. "Whistlin' Past the Graveyard" - 3:16
  - from Blue Valentine (1978)
  - Tom Waits - vocals, electric guitar
  - Alvin "Shine" Robinson - electric guitar
  - Harold Battiste - piano
  - Scott Edwards - bass
  - Earl Palmer - drums
  - Herbert Hardesty - tenor sax
5. "Burma Shave" - 6:33
  - from Foreign Affairs (1977)
  - Tom Waits - vocals, piano
  - Jim Hughart - bass
  - Jack Sheldon - trumpet
6. "Step Right Up" - 5:40
  - from Small Change (1976)
  - Tom Waits - vocals
  - Jim Hughart - bass
  - Shelly Manne - drums
  - Lew Tabackin - tenor sax
7. "Ol' '55" - 3:58
  - from Closing Time (1973)
  - Tom Waits - vocals, piano
  - Peter Klimes - guitar
  - Bill Plummer - bass
  - John Seiter - drums, vocals
8. "I Never Talk to Strangers (with Bette Midler)" - 3:38
  - from Foreign Affairs (1977)
  - Tom Waits - vocals, piano
  - Bette Midler - vocals
  - Jim Hughart - bass
  - Frank Vicari - tenor sax
  - Bob Alcivar - arranger, conductor
9. "Mr. Siegal" - 5:14
  - from Heartattack and Vine (1980)
  - Tom Waits - vocals, electric guitar
  - Roland Bautista - electric lead guitar
  - Ronny Barron - piano
  - Larry Taylor - bass
  - John Thomassie - drums
10. "Jersey Girl" - 5:10
  - from Heartattack and Vine (1980)
  - Tom Waits - vocals, electric guitar
  - Roland Bautista - 12-string guitar
  - Victor Feldman - keyboard glock, percussion
  - Greg Cohen - bass
  - John Thomassie - drums
  - Jerry Yester - arranger, conductor
11. "Christmas Card from a Hooker in Minneapolis" - 4:32
  - from Blue Valentine (1978)
  - Tom Waits - vocals, piano
  - DaWillie Gonga - Yamaha electric grand piano
12. "Blue Valentine" - 5:51
  - from Blue Valentine (1978)
  - Tom Waits - vocals, electric guitar
  - Ray Crawford - electric guitar solo
13. "(Looking for) The Heart of Saturday Night" - 3:51
  - from The Heart of Saturday Night (1974)
  - Tom Waits - vocals, acoustic guitar
  - Jim Hughart - bass
  - Jim Gordon - foot tap, knee slap
  - Selma & Cahuenga - streets
14. "Muriel" - 3:34
  - from Foreign Affairs (1977)
  - Tom Waits - vocals, piano
  - Jim Hughart - bass
  - Frank Vicari - tenor sax
15. "Wrong Side of the Road" - 5:14
  - from Blue Valentine (1978)
  - Tom Waits - vocals, electric guitar
  - Ray Crawford - electric guitar
  - Charles Kynard - organ
  - Jim Hughart - bass
  - Chip White - drums
  - Frank Vicari - tenor sax
16. "Tom Traubert's Blues (Four Sheets to the Wind in Copenhagen)" - 6:35
  - from Small Change (1976)
  - Tom Waits - vocals, piano
  - Jim Hughart - bass
  - Violins - Murray Adler, Israel Baker, Harry Bluestone, Nathan Kaproff, George Kast, Marvin Limonick, Alfred Lustgarden, Nathan Ross, Sheldon Sanov
  - Violas - Sam Boghossian, Allan Harshman, David Schwartz
  - Cellos - Jesse Ehrlich, Ray Kelley, Ed Lustgarden, Kathleen Lustgarden
  - Jerry Yester - arranger, conductor

== Personnel ==
- Vocals - Tom Waits, Bette Midler, John Seiter
- Acoustic Guitar - Tom Waits, Roland Bautista, Peter Klimes
- Electric Guitar - Tom Waits, Ray Crawford, Roland Bautista, Alvin "Shine" Robinson
- Bass - Jim Hughart, Larry Taylor, Greg Cohen, Scott Edwards, Bill Plummer
- Piano - Tom Waits, Ronnie Barron, Harold Battiste
- Electric Piano - DaWillie Gonga, Mike Melvoin
- Organ - Charles Kynard
- Drums - John Thomassie, Bill Goodwin, Shelly Manne, Earl Palmer, John Seiter, Chip White
- Percussion - Victor Feldman, Jim Gordon
- Arranger - Jerry Yester, Bob Alcivar
- Conductor - Jerry Yester, Bob Alcivar
- Violin - Murray Adler, Israel Baker, Harry Bluestone, Nathan Kaproff, George Kast, Marvin Limonick, Alfred Lustgarden, Nathan Ross, Sheldon Sanov
- Viola - Sam Boghossian, Allan Harshman, David Schwartz
- Cello - Jesse Ehrlich, Ray Kelley, Ed Lustgarden, Kathleen Lustgarden
- Trumpet - Jack Sheldon
- Tenor Saxophone - Frank Vicari, Pete Christlieb, Herbert Hardesty, Plas Johnson, Lew Tabackin
- Baritone Saxophone - Plas Johnson

== Charts ==
Chart (2002–06)	Peak position
Austrian Albums (Ö3 Austria)	63
Norwegian Albums (VG-lista)	18

== Certifications ==
Region	Certification	Certified units/sales
United Kingdom (BPI)	Silver	60,000^{‡}
^{‡} Sales+streaming figures based on certification alone.
