= Anthology of Tom Waits =

Compilation album by Tom Waits
- Released: 1985
- Recorded: 1971–1980
- Genre: Rock
- Length: 56:41
- Label: Asylum

Tom Waits chronology
| Swordfishtrombones (1983) | Anthology of Tom Waits (1985) | Rain Dogs (1985) |

Professional ratings
Review scores
| Source | Rating |
|---|---|
| AllMusic | 4.5/5 stars |

Anthology of Tom Waits is the first "best of" compilation of Tom Waits recordings, with tracks taken from his albums for Asylum Records.

The cover is by Matt Mahurin

== Track listing ==
Songs written by Tom Waits, except where noted.

Side one
| No. | Title | Length |
|---|---|---|
| 1. | "Ol' '55" (from Closing Time) | 3:55 |
| 2. | "Diamonds on My Windshield" (from The Heart of Saturday Night) | 3:10 |
| 3. | "(Looking For) Heart of Saturday Night" (The Heart of Saturday Night) | 3:50 |
| 4. | "I Hope That I Don't Fall in Love With You" (from Closing Time) | 3:52 |
| 5. | "Martha" (from Closing Time) | 4:26 |
| 6. | "Tom Traubert's Blues (Four Sheets to the Wind in Copenhagen)" (from Small Change) | 6:32 |
| 7. | "The Piano Has Been Drinking (Not Me)" (from Small Change) | 3:37 |

Side two
| No. | Title | Writer(s) | Length |
|---|---|---|---|
| 8. | "I Never Talk to Strangers" (from Foreign Affairs) | | 3:37 |
| 9. | "Somewhere (From West Side Story)" (from Blue Valentine) | Leonard Bernstein, Stephen Sondheim | 3:50 |
| 10. | "Burma Shave" (from Foreign Affairs) | | 6:40 |
| 11. | "Jersey Girl" (from Heartattack and Vine) | | 5:08 |
| 12. | "San Diego Serenade" (from The Heart of Saturday Night) | | 3:25 |
| 13. | "A Sight for Sore Eyes" (from Foreign Affairs) | | 4:39 |
