= If We Fall in Love Tonight =

Compilation album by Rod Stewart
- Released: 4 November 1996
- Genres: Rock, pop
- Length: 67:32 (U.S. version); 73:51 (international version)
- Label: Warner Bros.

Rod Stewart chronology
A Spanner in the Works (1995)	If We Fall in Love Tonight (1996)	When We Were the New Boys (1998)

Singles from If We Fall in Love Tonight
- 1. "If We Fall in Love Tonight" Released: November 1996; 2. "When I Need You" Released: 1997

Professional ratings
Review scores
Source	Rating
AllMusic	3/5 stars
The Rolling Stone Album Guide	3/5 stars

If We Fall in Love Tonight is an album released by Rod Stewart on 4 November 1996 in the United Kingdom and on 12 November 1996 in the United States. It includes mostly previously released songs. The album was released in both the US and UK, though the versions differ slightly. It was released by Warner Bros. Records, and produced the singles "If We Fall in Love Tonight" and "When I Need You".

== Background ==
The title track "If We Fall in Love Tonight", written for this album, had some legal wrangles regarding its copyright and track title which have now been resolved. The album also includes another original recording, "For the First Time", which was an Adult Contemporary hit for Kenny Loggins after it was included in the soundtrack for the film One Fine Day. The album includes two newly recorded cover versions of hit songs: "Sometimes When We Touch", originally by Dan Hill and "When I Need You", originally by Albert Hammond and a hit for Leo Sayer a few months later. Two other songs had not been previously released on a Rod Stewart album: "So Far Away", originally by Carole King, which had been released as a single in 1995 from that year's Carole King tribute album, Tapestry Revisited, and "All for Love", a collaboration with Bryan Adams and Sting, from the 1993 film soundtrack The Three Musketeers. Additionally, two songs were revamped for If We Fall in Love Tonight: "Have I Told You Lately", originally by Van Morrison and initially released on Stewart's Vagabond Heart, was remixed here; and "Forever Young", initially on Stewart's Out of Order, which was completely re-recorded. The remaining tracks were all previously released on various Rod Stewart albums.

== Track listing ==
US version
No.	Title	Writer(s)	Producer(s)	Length
1.	"If We Fall in Love Tonight" (new original song; previously unreleased)	Jimmy Jam and Terry Lewis	Jimmy Jam and Terry Lewis	5:39
2.	"For the First Time" (new original song; previously unreleased)	Jud Friedman, Allan Rich, James Newton Howard	Howard	4:01
3.	"When I Need You" (new cover song; previously unreleased)	Carole Bayer Sager, Albert Hammond	Jimmy Jam and Terry Lewis	4:50
4.	"So Far Away" (previously released on the Carole King tribute album, Tapestry Revisited)	Carole King	David Foster	4:20
5.	"Have I Told You Lately" (studio version remix) (new remixed version; previously unreleased)	Van Morrison	Rod Stewart, Bernard Edwards, Steve MacMillan^{[a]}	3:58
6.	"My Heart Can't Tell You No" (previously released on Stewart's Out of Order)	Simon Climie, Dennis Morgan	Stewart, Edwards, Andy Taylor	5:16
7.	"You're in My Heart" (previously released on Stewart's Foot Loose & Fancy Free)	Stewart	Tom Dowd	4:28
8.	"The First Cut Is the Deepest" (previously released on Stewart's A Night on the Town)	Cat Stevens	Dowd	3:50
9.	"I Don't Want to Talk About It" (original version on Stewart's Atlantic Crossing; this version taken from Stewart's Storyteller – The Complete Anthology: 1964–1990)	Danny Whitten	Dowd	4:50
10.	"Tonight's the Night (Gonna Be Alright)" (previously released on Stewart's A Night on the Town)	Stewart	Dowd	3:33
11.	"Sometimes When We Touch" (new cover song; previously unreleased)	Barry Mann, Dan Hill	Howard	4:24
12.	"Downtown Train" (previously released on Stewart's Storyteller – The Complete Anthology: 1964–1990)	Tom Waits	Trevor Horn	4:40
13.	"Broken Arrow" (previously released on Stewart's Vagabond Heart))	Robbie Robertson	Patrick Leonard, Lenny Waronker^{[b]}	4:21
14.	"Forever Young" (1996) (new re-recorded version; previously unreleased)	Stewart, Jim Cregan, Kevin Savigar	Savigar	4:52
15.	"All for Love" (with Bryan Adams & Sting, previously released on The Three Musketeers Soundtrack)	Bryan Adams, Robert John "Mutt" Lange, Michael Kamen	Chris Thomas, David Nicholas, Bryan Adams	4:41

=== International release ===
1. "If We Fall in Love Tonight" – 5:39
2. "For the First Time" – 4:01
3. "When I Need You" – 4:50
4. "Sometimes When We Touch" – 4:20
5. "Tonight's the Night (Gonna Be Alright)" – 3:33
6. "I Don't Want to Talk About It (1989)" – 4:50
7. "Have I Told You Lately" (studio remix version) – 3:58
8. "Broken Arrow" – 4:21
9. "Forever Young (1996)" – 4:52
10. "You're in My Heart (The Final Acclaim)" – 4:28
11. "My Heart Can't Tell You No" – 5:16
12. "The First Cut Is the Deepest" – 3:50
13. "Sailing" – 4:38
14. "Downtown Train" – 4:40
15. "Tom Traubert's Blues (Waltzing Matilda)" (previously released on Stewart's Lead Vocalist) – 6:10
16. "All for Love" (with Bryan Adams & Sting) – 4:41

Notes

- ^a signifies a remixer
- ^b signifies a co-producer
- The Japanese release replaces track 8, "Broken Arrow", with "Your Song" from the Elton John tribute album Two Rooms. The remaining track list is otherwise identical. On some releases, "Sailing" is replaced by "This".

== Production ==
- Mastered by Doug Sax
- Compilation and Mastering Advisor: Bill Schnee
- Photography: Ken Schles and Randee St. Nicholas
- Art Direction and Design: Stephen Walker
- Management: Arnold Stiefel and Annie Challis
- "If We Fall in Love Tonight" and "When I Need You" produced by Jimmy Jam and Terry Lewis
- "For the First Time" and "Sometimes When We Touch" produced by James Newton-Howard
- "So Far Away" produced by David Foster
- "Have I Told You Lately" produced by Rod Stewart & Bernard Edwards; Remixed by Steve MacMillan
- "Forever Young" produced by Kevin Savigar
- "All for Love" produced by Chris Thomas, Bryan Adams, and David Nicholas

== Charts ==
=== Weekly charts ===
Chart (1996–2008)	Peak position
Australian Albums (ARIA)	22
Austrian Albums (Ö3 Austria)	5
Belgian Albums (Ultratop Flanders)	26
Canada Top Albums/CDs (RPM)	8
Danish Albums (Hitlisten)	2
Dutch Albums (Album Top 100)	12
Finnish Albums (Suomen virallinen lista)	6
German Albums (Offizielle Top 100)	24
Hungarian Albums (MAHASZ)	35
New Zealand Albums (RMNZ)	11
Norwegian Albums (VG-lista)	6
Portuguese Albums (AFP)	12
Scottish Albums (Official Charts)	8
Spanish Albums (Promusicae)	54
Swedish Albums (Sverigetopplistan)	2
Swiss Albums (Schweizer Hitparade)	27
Taiwanese International Albums (IFPI)	4
UK Albums (Official Charts)	8
US Billboard 200	19

=== Year-end charts ===
Chart (1996)	Position
Swedish Albums (Sverigetopplistan)	13
UK Albums (OCC)	41

Chart (1997)	Position
Austrian Albums (Ö3 Austria)	46
Danish Albums (Hitlisten)	18
US Billboard 200	71

Chart (2006)	Position
Swedish Albums (Sverigetopplistan)	53

== Certifications ==
Region	Certification	Certified units/sales
Argentina (CAPIF)	Gold	30,000^{^}
Australia (ARIA)	Platinum	70,000^{^}
Austria (IFPI Austria)	Gold	25,000^{*}
Denmark (IFPI Danmark)	Platinum	50,000^{^}
Hong Kong (IFPI Hong Kong)	Platinum	20,000^{*}
New Zealand (RMNZ)	Platinum	15,000^{^}
Norway (IFPI Norway)	Gold	25,000^{*}
Portugal (AFP)	2× Platinum	80,000^{^}
Sweden (GLF)	Platinum	80,000^{^}
United Kingdom (BPI)	2× Platinum	600,000^{‡}
United States (RIAA)	Platinum	1,000,000^{^}
Summaries
Europe (IFPI)	Platinum	1,000,000^{*}
^{*} Sales figures based on certification alone.^{^} Shipments figures based on certification alone.^{‡} Sales+streaming figures based on certification alone.
