= Romeo Is Bleeding (song) =

Song by Tom Waits

from the album Blue Valentine
- Released: September 1978
- Recorded: July 24–August 26, 1978
- Studio: Filmways/Heider Recording, Hollywood, CA
- Genre: Rock, jazz, blues
- Length: 4:52
- Label: Asylum
- Songwriter: Tom Waits
- Producer: Bones Howe

"Romeo Is Bleeding" is a song written and performed by Tom Waits, and released on his 1978 album Blue Valentine. The lyrics make frequent use of Spanish, including phrases such as "Hey Pachuco!", "Dáme esa pistola, hombre!" (Give me that pistol, man!), "Hijo de la chingada madre!" (You son of a fucking whore!), and "Vamos a dormir, hombre" (Let's go to sleep, man). Waits also makes a reference to gangster movie-star James Cagney, previously mentioned in "Invitation to the Blues" on Small Change.

Jay S. Jacobs, in his book Wild years: the music and myth of Tom Waits, describes "Romeo is Bleeding" as depicting "a guy who sticks a shiv into the local sheriff [and] is fatally shot in the chest — a familiar Waits image, with echoes of West Side Story". Waits had more overtly referenced West Side Story earlier on Blue Valentine album, with his cover of "Somewhere". According to Waits, the song is based on a real incident in Los Angeles, and concerns "a Mexican gang leader who was shot and died in a movie house in downtown L.A."

Music critic Adrian Denning said "one song that would, could and SHOULD rank amongst [Waits'] finest moments is the fabulous Jazz swing and late night seedy feel of 'Romeo is Bleeding.'" While indifferent towards Blue Valentine in general, Denning remarked that the song "corrects matters somewhat", citing the song's "great vocals and... bass groove." Robert Christgau wrote that "Romeo is Bleeding" was "easily my favorite among his Chandleroid sagas of tragedy outside the law", but also added it is "more effective on the jacket than when he [Waits] underlines its emotional resonance in song." Patrick Humphries, in The many lives of Tom Waits, was unimpressed, labeling the song a "rewrite" of Waits' 1976 song "Small Change." The song later lent its name to the Peter Medak film Romeo Is Bleeding, starring Gary Oldman.

== Personnel ==
- Tom Waits – lead vocals, electric guitar
- Ray Crawford – electric guitar
- Jim Hughart – bass guitar
- Charles Kynard – hammond organ
- Chip White – drums
- Bobbye Hall Porter – congas
- Frank Vicari – tenor saxophone
