= Olympia Theatre, Dublin =

Concert hall and theatre in Dublin, Ireland

3Olympia Theatre
- The Olympia
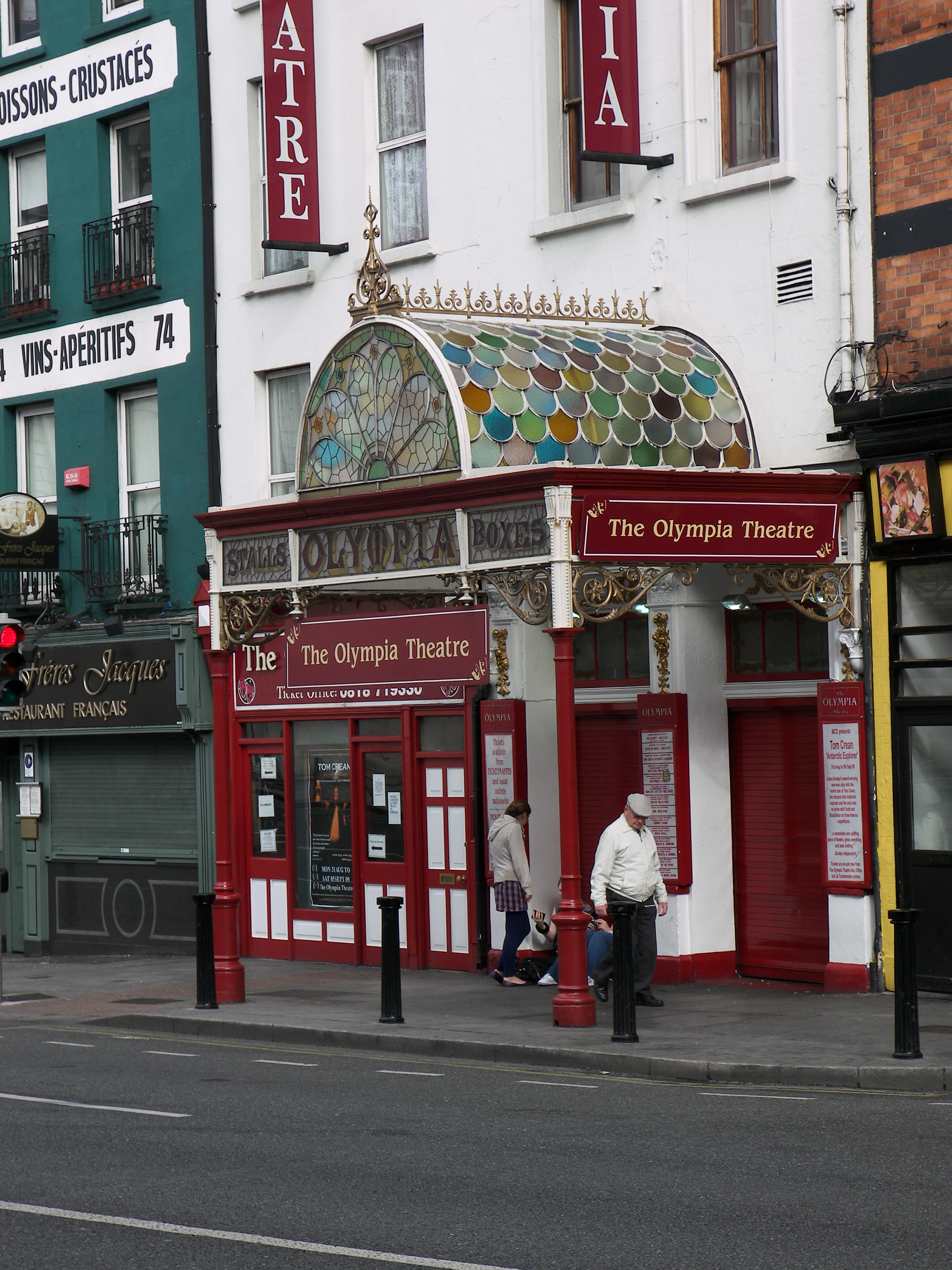
- Front entrance of the Olympia Theatre in August 2009

- Location within Central Dublin
- Former names: Star of Erin Music Hall (1879–1881); Dan Lowrey's Music Hall (1881–1889); Dan Lowrey's Palace of Varieties (1889–1897); Empire Palace Theatre (1897–1923); The Olympia Theatre (1923–2021)
- Address: 72 Dame Street; Dublin; Ireland
- Coordinates: 53.34428°N 6.26611°W
- Capacity: 1,289 seated, 1,621 standing and seating
- Type: Concert and events venue

Construction
- Opened: 1879
- Renovated: 1977 & 2016
- Architect: John J. Callaghan

Website
- 3olympia.ie

The Olympia Theatre, branded since 2021 for sponsorship purposes as the 3Olympia Theatre, is a concert hall and theatre venue in Dublin, Ireland, located on Dame Street.

In addition to Irish acts, the venue has played host to many well-known international artists down through the years such as Charlie Chaplin, Laurel and Hardy, David Bowie, Billy Connolly, Hall & Oates, R.E.M., Gary Numan, Radiohead and Adele.

The venue is owned by Caroline Downey of the music promotion company MCD Productions, with naming sponsorship provided under an eight-year deal with telecoms company, 3 (Three Ireland).

A branch of the River Poddle flows directly underneath the theatre.

== History ==
=== Origins ===
Dublin's Olympia Theatre started out as the "Star of Erin Music Hall" in 1879, with its principal entrance opening onto Crampton Court. The theatre was built on the site of a former saloon and music hall originally called Connell's Monster Saloon in 1855. It was renamed "Dan Lowrey's Music Hall" in 1881. In 1889 it was renamed again, this time to "Dan Lowrey's Palace of Varieties".

=== Empire Palace ===
A major transformation occurred in 1897 when the venue ceased operating as a music hall and reopened as a theatre under new management, renamed the "Empire Palace". The nature of performances changed, reflecting shifts in the entertainment industry. During Queen Victoria’s visit to Dublin in 1900, the Empire Palace was a focal point of public gatherings. Similarly, on 11 July 1921, the day of the truce ending the Irish War of Independence, crowds assembled outside the theatre near Dublin Castle.

=== Reinvention as the Olympia Theatre ===
The venue was renamed the "Olympia Theatre" in 1923. began staging drama, opera, ballet, films, oratorio, and pantomime, with variety performances remaining a financial mainstay. In 1952, theatre producers Stanley Illsely and Leo McCabe took over management, focusing primarily on dramatic productions for the next 12 years.

=== Threat of demolition and preservation efforts ===
In the early 1960s, a group of London-Irish businessmen purchased the Olympia Theatre and the land on which it stood, with the intention of demolishing the building to construct an office block. While their planning application was under review, Dublin-based theatre producer Brendan Smith intervened. He negotiated a lease agreement with the new owners and established Olympia Productions Limited, alongside fellow directors Jack Cruise, Lorcan Bourke, and Richard Hallinan, with Smith serving as chairman. The lease was repeatedly renewed as the landlords persisted in seeking planning permission for demolition and redevelopment. However, Olympia Productions eventually secured an ongoing right of renewal, ensuring the venue's continued operation as a theatre, provided it remained commercially viable. This legal safeguard effectively thwarted the owners' efforts to demolish the building.

=== 1974 collapse and restoration ===
On 5 November 1974, the theatre's proscenium arch collapsed during a rehearsal of West Side Story, causing the roof to cave in. The theatre remained closed for nearly two and a half years. With support from Dublin City Council, the wider public, the Irish theatre community, and Olympia Productions, the theatre was restored and reopened on 14 March 1977. Throughout the 1980s, Olympia Productions Limited continued to operate the theatre. In the mid-1980s, a new board took over and managed the venue for 18 years. In 1995, Denis Desmond and Caroline Downey acquired the Olympia.

=== 3Olympia Theatre ===
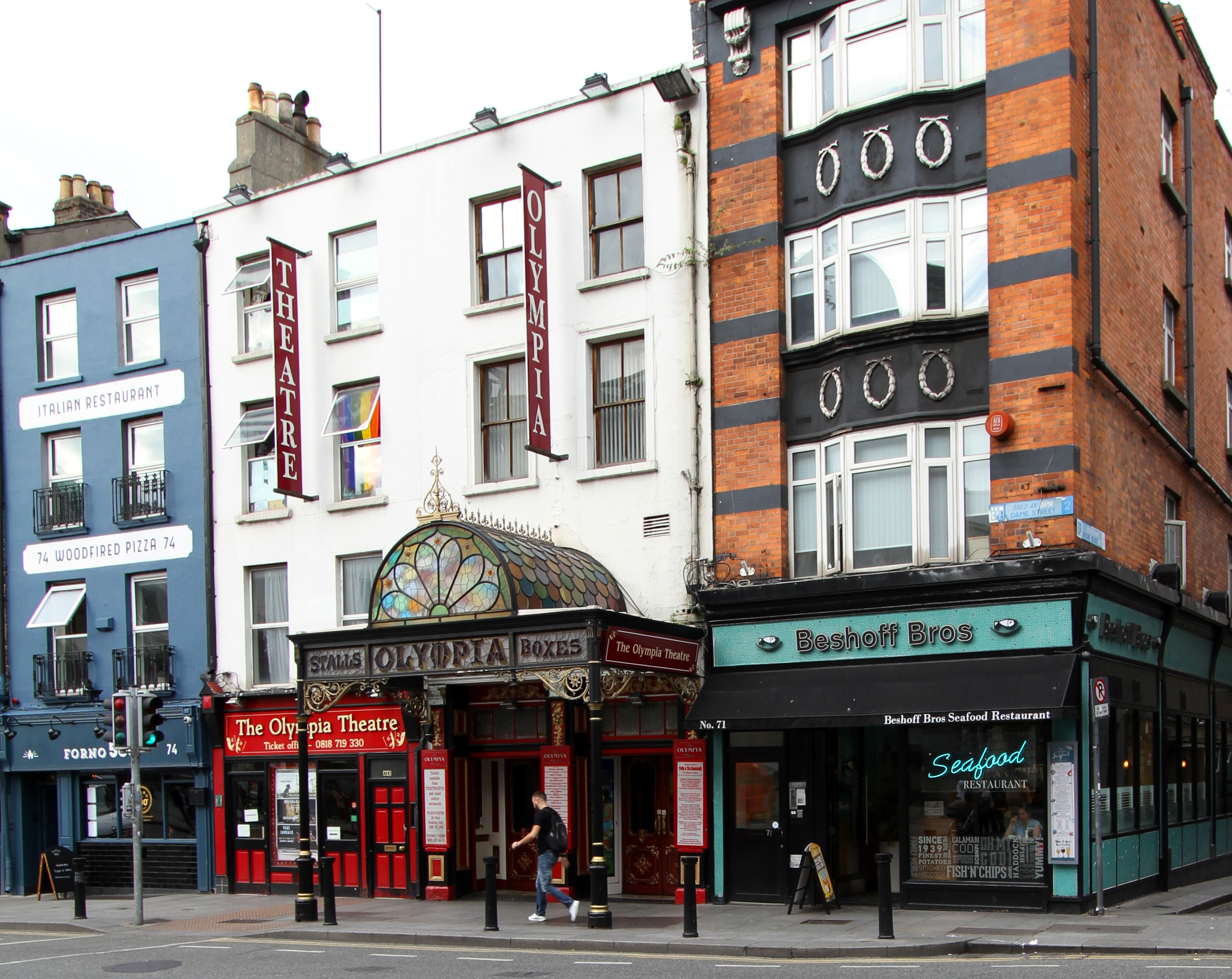
Exterior of the venue in 2017

In September 2021, as part of an eight-year sponsorship deal with telecoms company Three Ireland, the venue was rebranded as the "3Olympia Theatre". The name-change which accompanied the sponsorship deal, reportedly prompted to "help the theatre recover from the COVID-19 pandemic", was subject to some controversy. The family of the former owners reportedly organising a petition against the change.

== Refurbishments ==
The possibility of demolishing the building was considered by the local council and the owners in the 1960s. Previous owners had attempted to get permission to demolish the theatre as early as 1970, despite a 1967 Dublin City Council resolution calling for the building's preservation. A scheme to replace the theatre with an office block, multi-storey car park and a smaller theatre were rejected. In November 1974, the Olympia was forced to close following major structural damage when parts of the proscenium arch and the ceiling above collapsed. A restoration fund was begun and Dublin City Council eventually placed a preservation order on the theatre. The theatre was restored and redecorated, allowing it to reopen on 14 March 1977.

In November 2004, a truck reversing on Dame Street crashed into the front of the Olympia, damaging the building. A cast-iron and glass canopy from the 1890s, by the Saracen Foundry in Glasgow, was demolished during the accident but subsequently restored. In 2016, the theatre was again refurbished. This time the building was completely refurbished at a cost of over €4 million with the venue remaining open during renovation work.

== Performance history ==
=== Concerts ===
The venue has hosted concerts and performances by both domestic and international acts, including: Adele, Ryan Adams, Arcade Fire, Aslan, Barenaked Ladies, David Bowie, Charlie Chaplin, Blondie, Billy Connolly, Chris Cornell, Dead Can Dance, Goldfrapp, Human League, Jack L, Marina Diamandis, Midge Ure, Ellie Goulding, Florence and the Machine, Foo Fighters, Kraftwerk, KSI, Laurel and Hardy, Lisa Stansfield, LCD Soundsystem, Amy Macdonald, Kacey Musgraves, Ice Spice, Gary Numan, Paramore, Radiohead, The Coronas, The Corrs, The Dubliners, The Killers, The Script, Tori Amos, Charli XCX, Madison Beer, Tate McRae, Gracie Abrams, Sabrina Carpenter, Alessi Rose, The Game, and Vulfpeck. Tom Waits recorded his live version of "The Piano Has Been Drinking" here, released in 1981 on the Bounced Checks compilation. Comedian and actor Dermot Morgan recorded Dermot Morgan Live here on 16 April 1994. The 1995 film An Awfully Big Adventure shot a number of scenes at the theatre.

R.E.M. held a five-night residency at the venue in the summer of 2007 and used those sessions for their 2009 album Live at the Olympia. Kris Kristofferson recorded a live set at the Olympia for the special edition of his 2009 album Closer to the Bone. Erasure played two consecutive sold-out shows at the Olympia during their Total Pop! Tour in June 2011, recording footage used for the video of their single "When I Start To (Break It All Down)". The band played again in this venue in 2014 for two consecutive sold-out nights and in 2018 for three consecutive nights.

Tori Amos played her first European gig in the Olympia. In September 2015, Sweden's Eurovision Song Contest winner Måns Zelmerlöw kicked off a 17-date European tour at the venue. Paramore kicked off their European tour of their new album After Laughter from this theatre in June 2017.

=== Pantomimes ===
The Olympia, along with Dublin's Gaiety Theatre and The Helix Theatre, presents an annual Christmas pantomime. Its most recent productions have been Aladdin, Cinderella, Jack and the Beanstalk, Robin Hood and a revival of Cinderella which starred Jedward as the Fairy Godbrothers. In 2011, the Olympia pantomime featured Jedward once more in Jedward and the Beanstalk.

== See also ==
- List of concert halls

== Sources ==
- Anthony, Barry (2010). The King's Jester. London: I. B. Taurus & Co. ISBN 978-1-84885-430-7.
