= Step Right Up =

Step Right Up may refer to:

- Step Right Up (song), a song by Tom Waits
- Step Right Up: The Songs of Tom Waits, a 1995 tribute album to Tom Waits
- Step Right Up, a 2001 album by Charlie Robison
- Step Right Up (Parenthood), an episode of the TV series
