= If We Fall in Love Tonight (song) =

1996 single by Rod Stewart

Single by Rod Stewart

from the album If We Fall in Love Tonight
- B-side: "Tom Traubert's Blues (Waltzing Matilda)"
- Released: November 1996
- Genre: Pop; R&B
- Length: 5:39 (Album Version); 4:01 (Single Version)
- Label: Warner Bros. Records
- Songwriter: Jimmy Jam and Terry Lewis
- Producer: Jimmy Jam and Terry Lewis

Rod Stewart singles chronology
"Purple Heather" (1996)	"If We Fall in Love Tonight" (1996)	"When I Need You" (1997)

Music video
- "If We Fall in Love Tonight" by Rod Stewart on YouTube

"If We Fall in Love Tonight" is a song by British singer Rod Stewart. It was written, composed, and produced by Jimmy Jam and Terry Lewis, and was released as the lead single from his 1996 ballad compilation If We Fall in Love Tonight. It reached the top five on the Adult Contemporary chart in both the US and Canada, and it also achieved his highest-ever position on the Adult Pop Airplay chart by peaking at #25.

Billboard described the song as "an unlikely collaboration that works extraordinarily well... one of the best Stewart singles in ages." The song was among the hits selected to receive orchestral arrangements for his 2019 album, You're in My Heart: Rod Stewart with the Royal Philharmonic Orchestra.

== Track listings ==
- Single-CD: Warner Bros. Records / 9 17459-2 USA
1. "If We Fall In Love Tonight (Edit)" – 3:58 (Jimmy Jam and Terry Lewis)
2. "Tom Traubert's Blues (Waltzing Matilda) (Non-Album Track)" – 6:10 (Tom Waits) 1
- Single-CD: Warner Bros. Records / 9362-43806-2 Europe
1. "If We Fall in Love Tonight (Edit)" – 4:00 (Jimmy Jam and Terry Lewis)
2. "So Far Away" – 4:20 (Carole King)
3. "I Was Only Joking" – 4:50 (Gary Grainger, Rod Stewart)
4. "Ten Days of Rain" – 5:24 (Kevin Savigar, Tony Brock, Rod Stewart) 2
- Single-CD: Warner Bros. Records / 9362-43800-2 Germany
1. "If We Fall in Love Tonight (Edit)" – 4:01 (Jimmy Jam and Terry Lewis)
2. "If We Fall in Love Tonight (Album Version)" – 5:42 (Jimmy Jam and Terry Lewis)
3. "Tom Traubert's Blues (Waltzing Matilda) (Non-Album Track)" – 6:10 (Tom Waits) 3

== Charts ==
=== Weekly charts ===
Chart (1996-1997)	Peak position
Canada Adult Contemporary (RPM)	4
Germany (GfK)	70
UK Singles (OCC)	58
US Billboard Hot 100	54
US Adult Contemporary (Billboard)	4
US Adult Pop Airplay (Billboard)	25

=== Year-end charts ===
Chart (1997)	Rank
Canada Adult Contemporary (RPM)	26
US Adult Contemporary (Billboard)	9
