= Crampton Court, Dublin =

Passage way in central Dublin, Ireland

Crampton Court
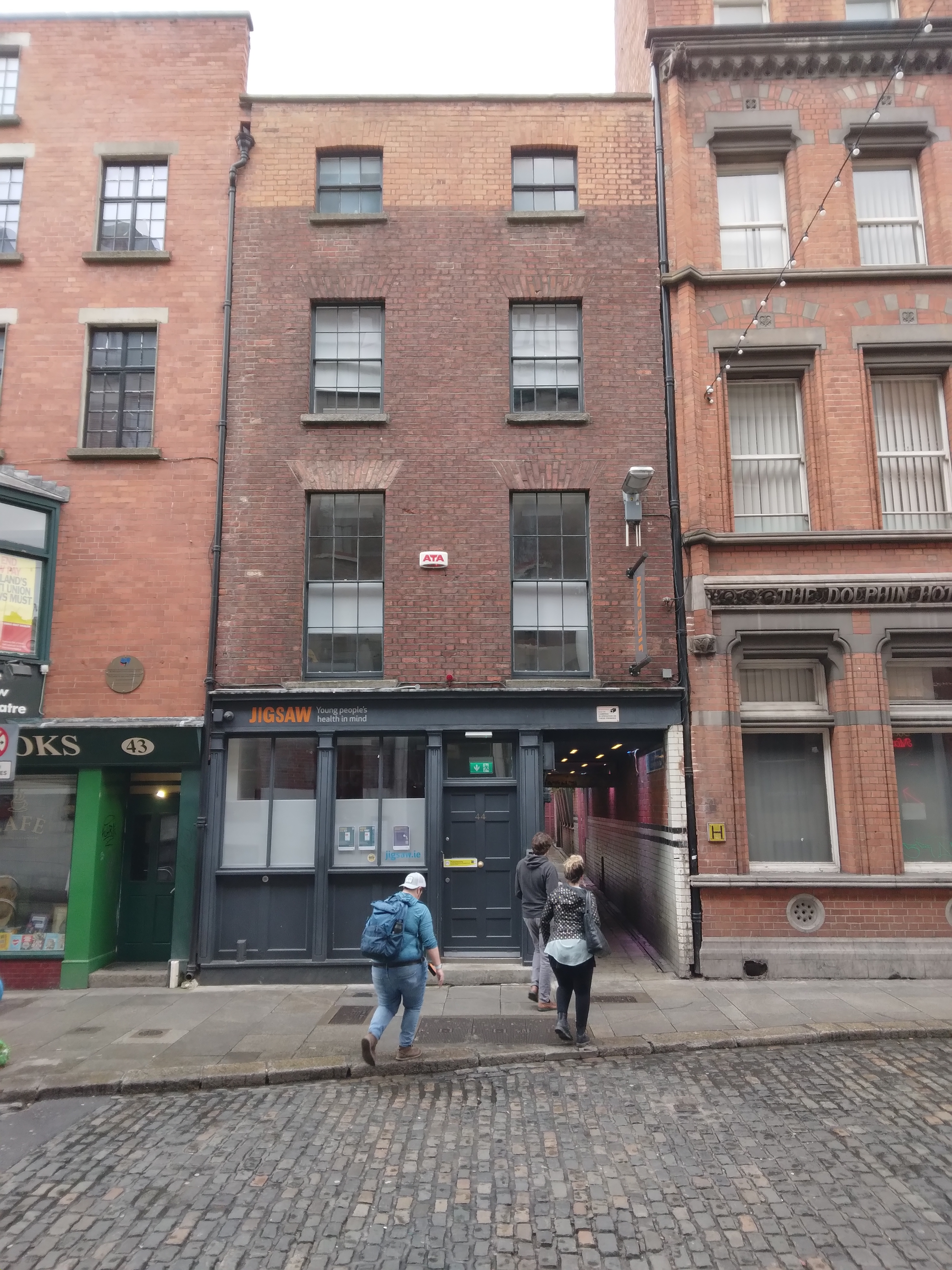
- The northern entrance into the lane (from Essex Street East)
- Native name: Cúirt Crampton (Irish)
- Namesake: Philip Crampton
- Length: 90 m (300 ft)
- Location: Dublin, Ireland
- Postal code: D02
- north end: Essex Street East
- south end: Dame Street

Construction
- Completed: 1745

Crampton Court (Irish: Cúirt Crampton), also colloquially known as Love Lane since the mid-2010s, is a short lane or passageway located in Temple Bar in central Dublin, Ireland. A small open-air square exists at approximately the halfway point of the lane (next to a fire exit from the Olympia Theatre), measuring approximately 11.5 by 16.7 metres wide, from which narrow, semi-covered lanes lead to its northern and southern entrances.

== Location ==
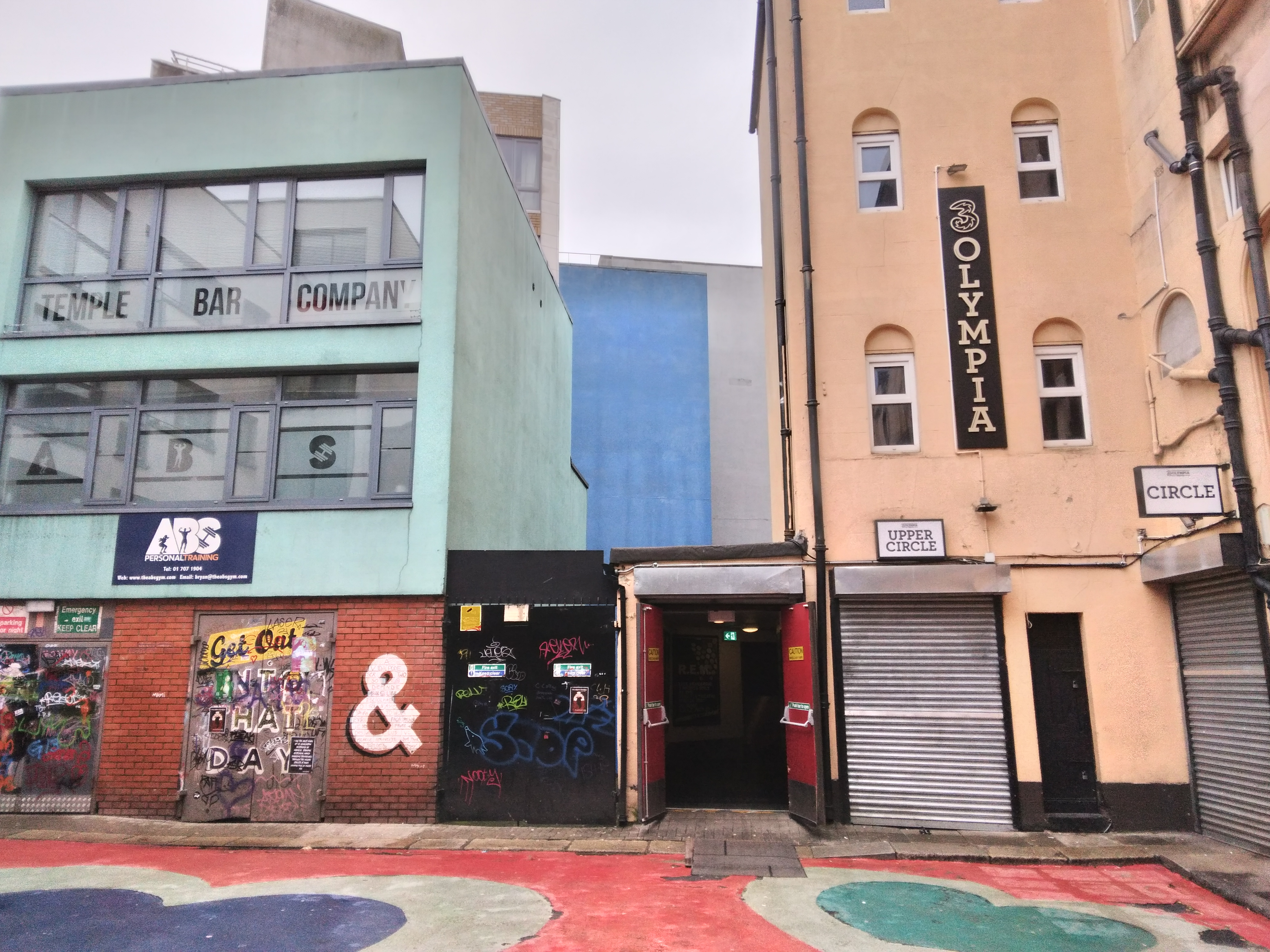
Looking north (open fire exit from the Olympia Theatre visible)

Crampton Court runs from Dame Street (under the sign for Brogan's Bar) in the south, to Essex Street East in the north. It is probable that Palace Street, directly across from the southern entrance to Crampton Court, once formed a continuous thoroughfare through Crampton Court from Dublin Castle to the Dublin quays and original Custom House, the focal point of mercantile trade in the city for much of the 18th century.

== History ==
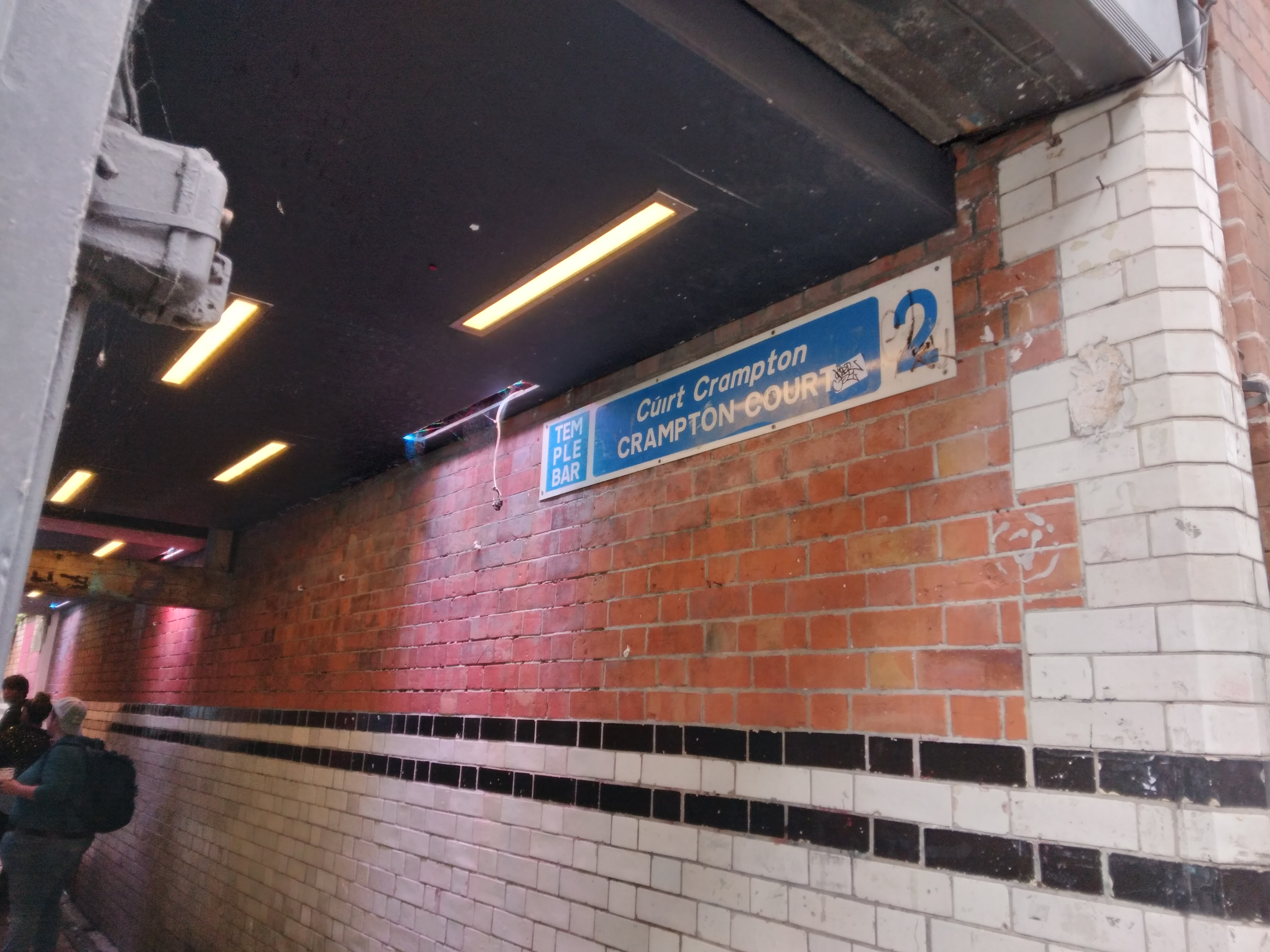
Name plaque at the northern entrance into the lane (wooden beam visible)

The lane is probably medieval in age. Opposite to Castle Lane (modern day Palace Street) was the station of the Horse Guard of Dublin, and on the removal of the military in the early part of the 1700s, "this locality" came into the ownership of the wealthy bookseller Philip Crampton (1696–1792), the Cramptons being one of the major landowning families in the Temple Bar area. Philip Crampton chose to live in the locality for many years after he had retired from business. According to The Encyclopaedia of Dublin:

The court was built in 1745. In 1755, his brethren of the Corporation of Stationers presented him with a large silver cup in acknowledgement of his work as Sheriff. Crampton was elected Lord Mayor in 1758 and died in Grafton Street in 1792, at 96 years of age.

At some point in the eighteenth century, the court (or passeway) was named after Crampton.

Until 1791, when a new Custom House was constructed further downstream, the original Custom House for Dublin was located at Essex Quay, a short distance from Crampton Court. The area was frequented by merchants, businesspeople and insurance companies and was heavily used. David Alfred Chart, in his 1907 publication The Story of Dublin, gave an impression of the area as it would have been at the time:

Crampton Court, near the Empire Theatre, was the unofficial 'Change of Dublin, before the regular Exchange, which is now the City Hall, was erected (in 1779). The old Custom House was close at hand, and vessels were moored along the quays, to which these northward turnings off Dame Street lead. The merchants found Crampton Court a convenient place in which to meet and make their bargains. In fact, they were somewhat loath to leave their alley, even when a proper building was provided for them.

In the 18th century, the lane was the site of two coffee houses: the 'Little Dublin Coffee House' at number 20, and the 'Royal Exchange Coffee House'. Flora Mitchell, in her 1966 book Vanishing Dublin, described it as being:

...the unofficial "exchange" of Dublin until the "commercial buildings" were opened in 1799. No 20, 'The Little Dublin Coffee House' provided the merchants with a meeting place prior to this. Crampton Court had been used as a short cut from the Olympia Theatre to the well known Dolphin Restaurant prior to it being demolished in 1963.

In November 1787, the inhabitants of Crampton Court were inundated by a flood of the River Poddle during a period of heavy rain, as were other areas of the city. As one Dublin newspaper reported:

Patrick Street presented a melancholy spectacle, the mountain floods having raised the water in that quarter to a most distressing height insomuch that the inhabitants from the end of New Street to Bride's Alley were necessitated to keep to the upper apartments. A few vessels in the river were forced from their moorings... The inhabitants of the New Row and the lower end of Meath Street were yesterday in similar circumstances with those of Patrick Street in consequence of the flood, and last night those of Crampton Court and Palace Street were put to distressing circumstances by the Poddle stream which breaking through its bounds in Lower Castle Yard inundated the houses in both places.

Following 1799, the merchants relocated to Commercial Buildings, a seven-bay three-storey granite palazzo built on College Green by Dublin merchants in 1796-9, and Crampton Court was subsequently occupied by jewellers and watchmakers.

By 1850, the street was occupied by a watch case maker, shell fish dealer, tailor, preparer of soda water, gun maker and a tavern named The Castle, according to The Dublin Pictorial Guide & Directory of 1850. In the 1862 edition of Thom's Almanac and Official Directory, a range of merchants, dentists, taverns, tenements and trades (including Rathbornes Candles wax and spermaceti candle manufactory) were listed as occupying addresses in Crampton Court. In 1879, the Star of Erin Music Hall (modern day Olympia Theatre) was established on Crampton Court. As the National Inventory of Architectural Heritage note, the theatre's "former orientation to Crampton Court is evident, with the outline of earlier openings remaining".

The lane fell into decay in the 1950s, and by the 1960s, most of the houses had been reduced to single-storey structures.

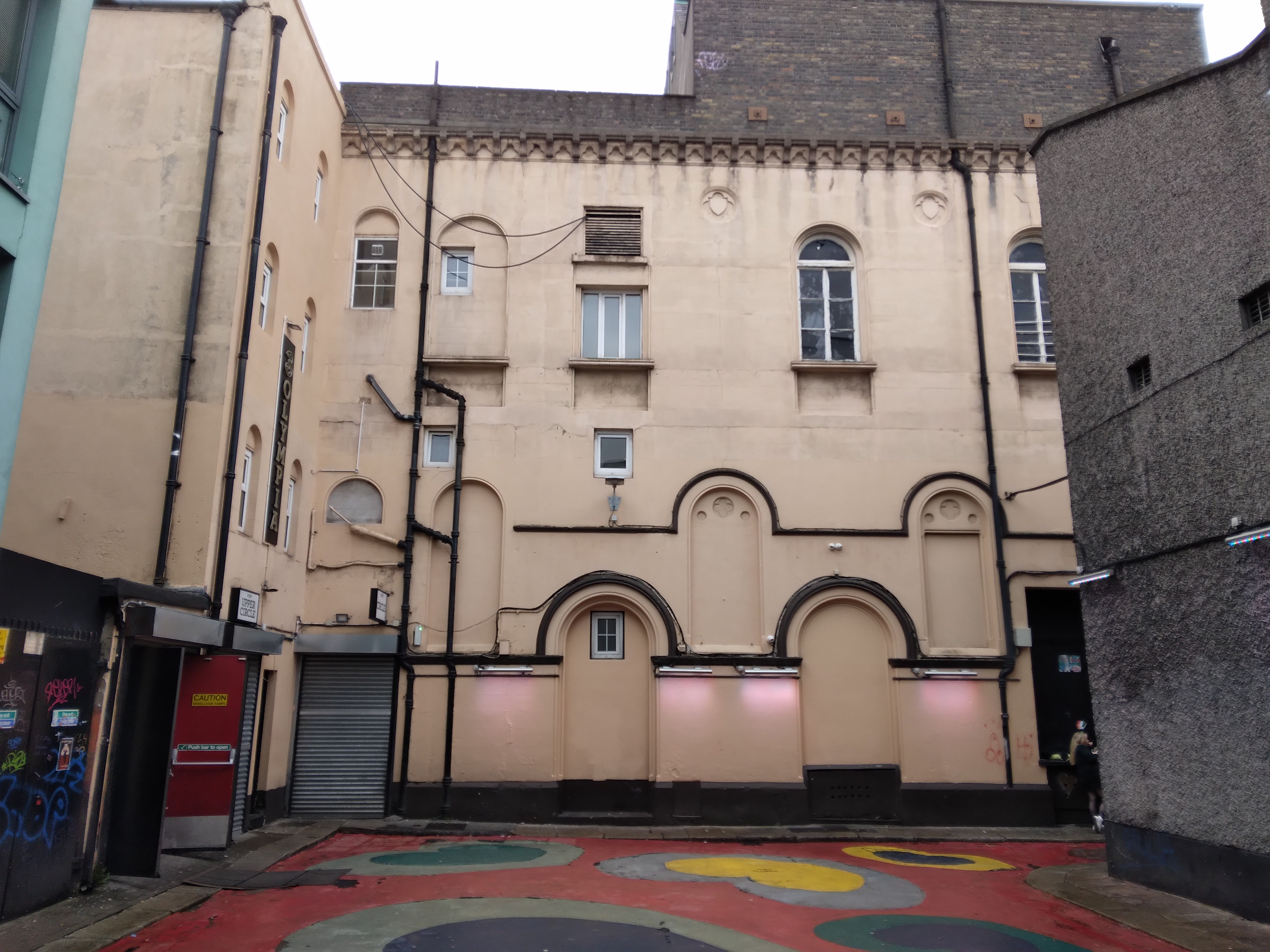
The southern side of the modern-day Olympia Theatre with alcoves of its former entrance extant

== Regeneration ==
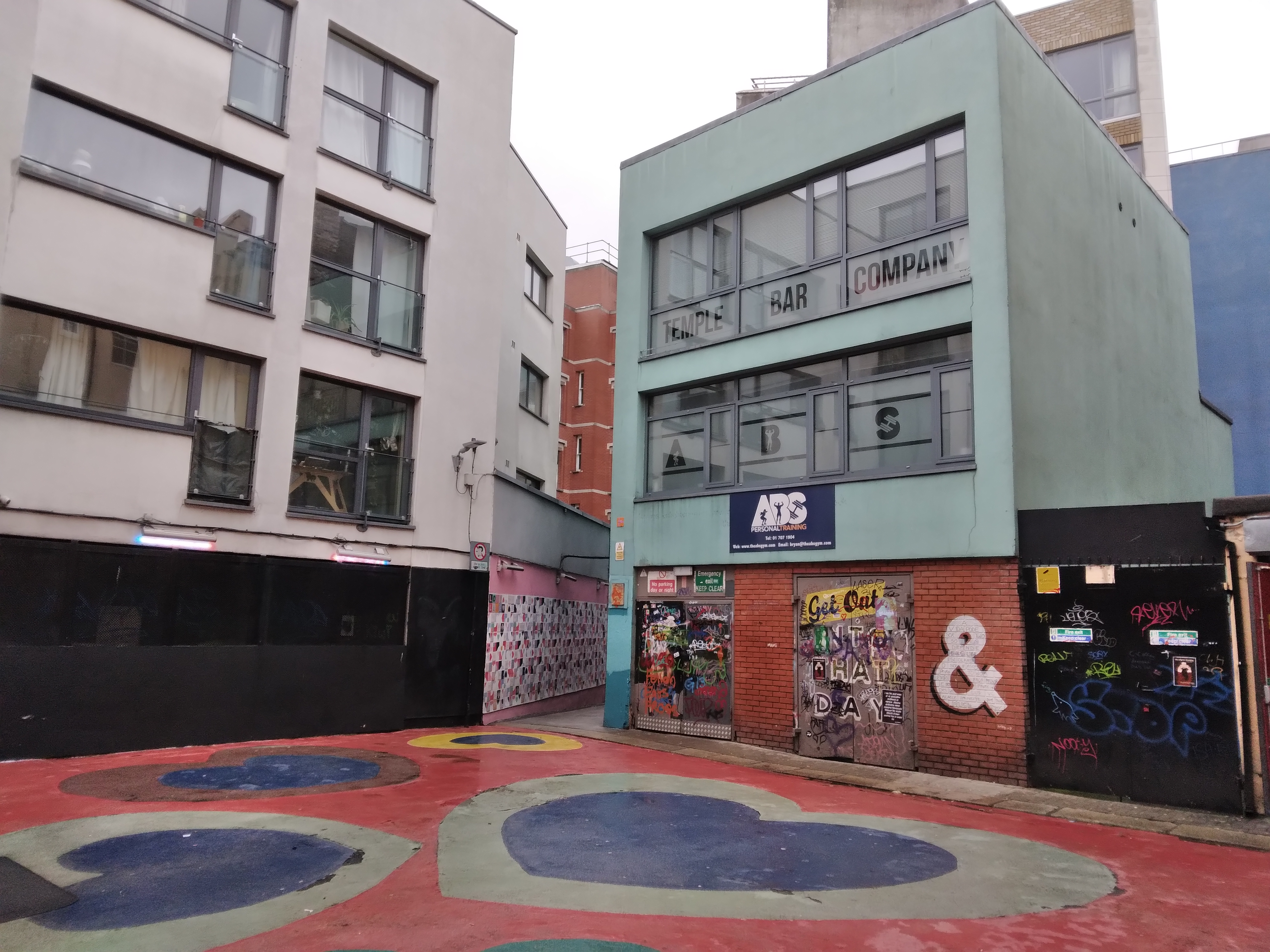
The open-air square in the middle of the lane (facing north-west towards the "Love Lane" installation)

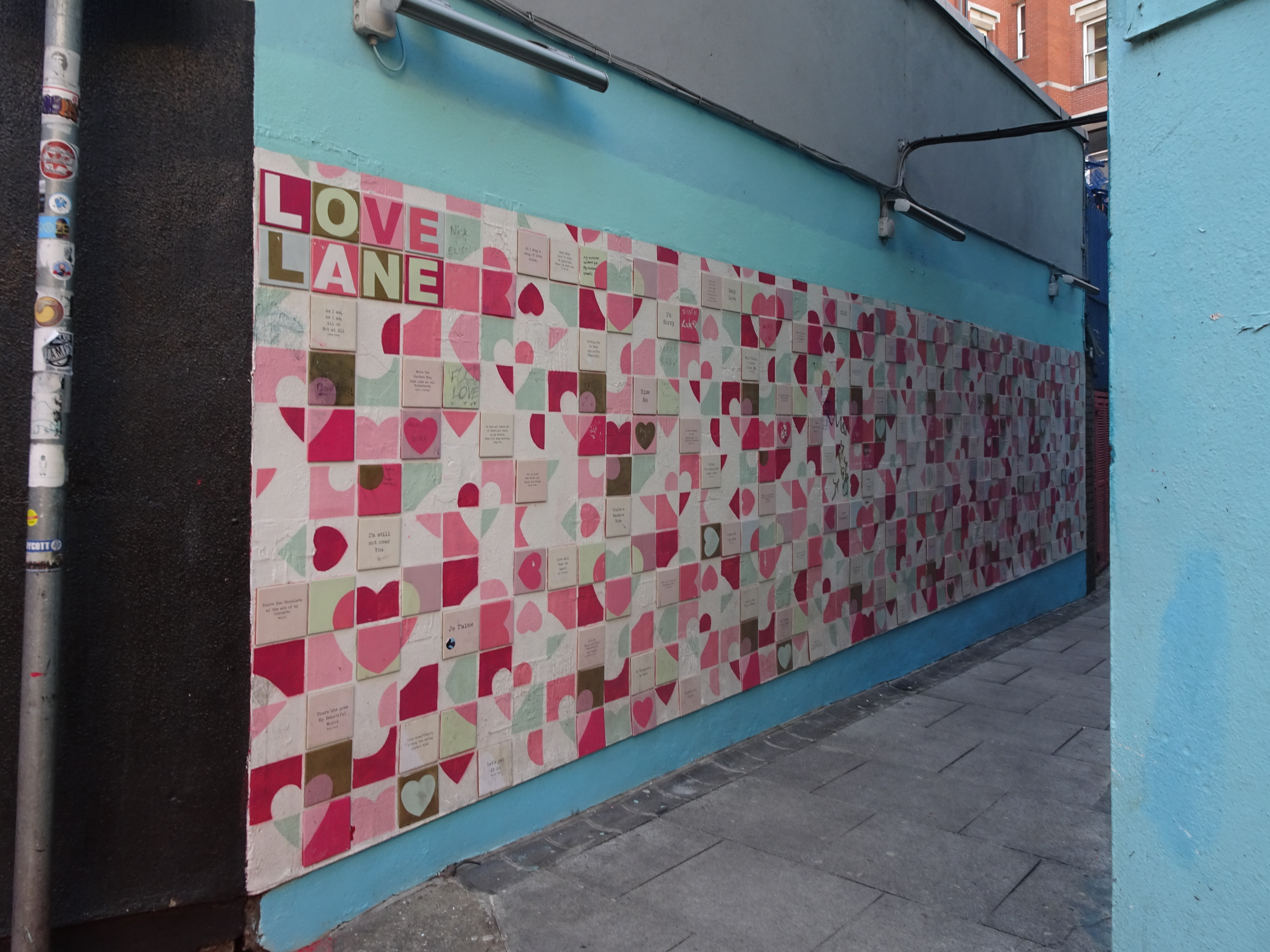
The tiles at Love Lane

In 2014 it was noted by Dublin City Council that "over the years" the back lanes of Temple Bar had fallen into disuse and become magnets for anti-social behaviour, making them intimidating places to walk through, especially at night. That year a joint initiative between the Council and the Temple Bar Company called Love the Lanes was undertaken to pilot solutions and interventions to address some of these issues in a select number of laneways in Temple Bar. 'Love the Lanes' launched an open call through March and April 2014 from designers, crafters, environmentalists, horticulturists, artists, entrepreneurs, local residents and businesses for ideas on what could be done to improve these areas. The initiative believed the lanes had "the potential to become great pedestrian spaces, [and potential works could] boost activity and feed into Temple Bar's vibrant arts and culture scene". The main areas being considered for the initiative were the Adair and Bedford Lanes, Copper Alley and Crampton Court.

Many proposals were received, of which ten were shortlisted for implementation. Three of these were eventually launched on Crampton Court (on a trial basis) on Thursday 24 July 2014 at 11am, turning Crampton Court into an open-air gallery. The three aforementioned submissions were "Bloom Fringe Legacy" (a series of green wall installations by Esther Gerard, Eoghan O'Riordan and Edward Coveney), "Love Lane" (a tiled wall installation by Anna Doran) and "White Lady Spray Fest" (by Alexa MacDermot and Minaw Collective, Female Street Artists Ireland). Other ideas which were submitted included painting a colourful red and white floral rug pattern onto the entirety of the floor of Crampton Court using an asphalt paint.

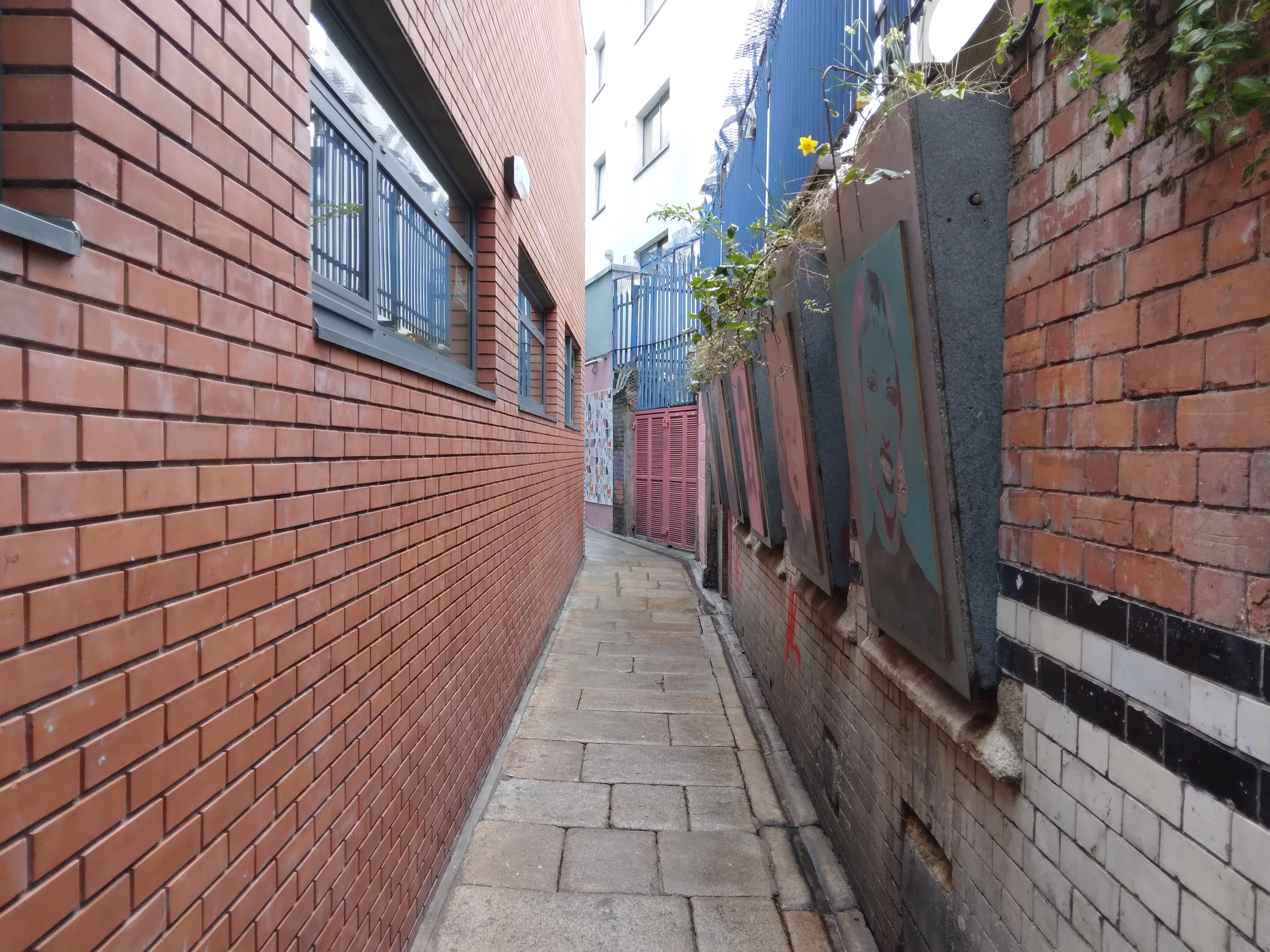
Looking south towards the "Love Lane" installation)

In June 2018, the "Love Lane" installation was revamped by the artist, including new ceramic tiles with quotes about love and heartbreak, lyrics, poetry and Irish wit submitted by the public to the artist via social media. The lane has become popular with instagram users, and sees "dozens of interested people every day".

== Architecture ==
All of the original houses in Crampton Court have now been demolished, however a number of the buildings facing the interior are protected structures.

The street is notable for a wooden beam (of indeterminable age) which crosses the lane above head height at its northern end.

== See also ==
- Crampton Buildings, a nearby flat housing complex in Temple Bar, built in 1891 by the Dublin Artisans' Dwellings Company
- Crampton Quay, one of the Dublin quays abutting the River Liffey

== Sources ==
- Bennett, Douglas (2005) [First published 1991]. The Encyclopaedia of Dublin (Revised and Expanded). Gill & Macmillan. ISBN 0-7171-3684-1.
- Chart, David Alfred (1907). The Story of Dublin. London: J. M. Dent & Co., Aldine House, 29 and 30 Bedford Street, Covent Garden, W.C.
- Duffy, Seán; Montague, John; Mulligan, Kevin; O'Neill, Michael (2022). Dublin Castle: From Fortress to Palace, Volume 1: Vikings to Victorians. Wordwell Books. ISBN 978-1-4468-8071-5.
- Fitzpatrick, Samuel A. Ossory (1907). Dublin. A Historical and Topographical Account of the City. Cork: Tower Books.
- Gillespie, Elgy (1973). The Liberties of Dublin. Its History, People and Future. Dublin: E. & T. O'Brien Ltd.
- Shaw, Henry (1988). The Dublin Pictorial Guide & Directory of 1850. Belfast: Friar's Bush Press. ISBN 0-946872-11-2.
- Mitchell, Flora (1966). Vanishing Dublin. Dublin: Allen Figgis.
