= Romeo Is Bleeding =

- Theatrical release poster
- Directed by: Peter Medak
- Written by: Hilary Henkin
- Produced by: Hilary Henkin; Paul Webster
- Starring: Gary Oldman; Lena Olin; Annabella Sciorra; Juliette Lewis; Roy Scheider
- Cinematography: Dariusz Wolski
- Edited by: Walter Murch
- Music by: Mark Isham
- Production companies: PolyGram Filmed Entertainment; Working Title Films; Hilary Henkin Productions
- Distributed by: Gramercy Pictures (United States); Rank Film Distributors (United Kingdom)
- Release dates: September 1993 (Toronto International Film Festival); 4 February 1994 (United States); 29 April 1994 (United Kingdom)
- Running time: 109 minutes
- Countries: United Kingdom; United States
- Language: English
- Budget: $10 million
- Box office: $7 million

Romeo Is Bleeding is a 1993 neo-noir crime thriller film directed by Peter Medak, written and produced by Hilary Henkin, and starring Gary Oldman, Lena Olin, Annabella Sciorra, Juliette Lewis, and Roy Scheider. It follows a psychosexual cat-and-mouse game between a corrupt cop (Oldman), and a ruthless, sadistic mob assassin (Olin). The film's title was taken from a song by Tom Waits.

Released in the United States by Gramercy Pictures, the film was critically unsuccessful and did not perform well at the box office (grossing $7 million from a $10 million budget), although its acting has garnered praise.

== Plot ==
Jack Grimaldi is an NYPD homicide detective who seems to have everything: a lavish life; a beautiful wife, Natalie; and an adoring teenaged mistress, Sheri. Jack can only afford his life because he is on the take, doing favors for Mafia boss Don Falcone in exchange for money. Jack's latest task is to reveal the location of Nick Gazzara, a mobster-turned-state's witness protected by federal agents. Gazzara and his protection detail are killed by a mob hit woman, Mona Demarkov. Jack is disaffected by this outcome, being uncomfortable with his complicity in the deaths of other law enforcement personnel.

Mona is arrested and Falcone assigns Jack to kill her, as he fears that she could not only testify against him but take over his operation. Still ambivalent about his double life, Jack is assigned as Mona's minder and transports her to a safe house to await pick-up by federal agents. Upon arrival, Mona quickly seduces and tries to kill Jack, but they are interrupted by the agents. Jack leaves Mona in their custody.

Falcone, disappointed in Jack's ineptitude, orders one of his toes to be amputated. Realizing he has endangered his wife and mistress, Jack instructs Natalie to leave the city immediately, giving her all of the payoff money he has saved as well as instructions for where to meet him out West when the time is right. Jack also ends his affair with Sheri and puts her on a train out of town. He tracks down Mona, who offers to pay Jack to help her fake her own death.

Although he obtains false papers for her, Mona refuses to pay and tries to strangle Jack. He shoots her in the arm, then tries to drive away with her handcuffed in the back seat. Mona escapes by hooking her legs around his neck, causing him to crash the car. She slithers out through the shattered windscreen without freeing her hands. Mona lures Jack to an empty apartment. He tries to kill her again but is tricked into shooting Sheri instead. Mona fixes the corpse so as to suggest that it was her and not Sheri. Mona has Jack abducted and transported to an abandoned warehouse where she handcuffs him to a bed and they have sex. Later, she forces Jack to assist her in burying Falcone alive.

Mona betrays Jack by turning him in to the police, copping a plea deal that will indict Jack for the multiple murders that she tricked him into committing. The police arrange a confrontation between Jack and Mona at the courthouse. Mona tells Jack that sex with him was lame, that Jack's wife "is a dead woman" and that Jack himself "is a dead man". Furious, Jack grabs a gun from a fellow officer's ankle holster and shoots Mona dead. He turns the gun on himself, only to discover that the revolver is empty. Instead of being sent to prison for the murder, he is given a commendation. This frees him to begin a new life out West, under the identity of "Jim Daugherty".

The final scene shows Jack living alone in a remote desert town and working at a diner. He waits every May 1 and December 1 for his wife, Natalie, to find him, as they planned before she left; but she never does. As he waits for her, he mourns his old life while looking at his wedding photo album: first, the many color photos of himself and Natalie, followed by black and white Polaroids of him with his various paramours, including Sheri. The photos with Mona have been removed.

== Cast ==
- Gary Oldman as Jack Grimaldi/Jim Daugherty
- Lena Olin as Mona Demarkov
- Annabella Sciorra as Natalie Grimaldi
- Juliette Lewis as Sheri
- Roy Scheider as Don Falcone
- Michael Wincott as Sal
- David Proval as Scully
- Will Patton as Martie
- Tony Sirico as Malacci
- James Cromwell as Cage
- Ron Perlman as Jack's Attorney
- Dennis Farina as Nick Gazzara (uncredited)

== Production ==
The film was shot on location in the New York City neighborhoods of Coney Island, Williamsburg, Bushwick, Manhattan, and Queens.

Jon Bon Jovi wrote the song "Always" for the film but withheld the track after he was dissatisfied with a preview screening. Bon Jovi in 2004 recalled, "The script was great: the movie wasn't."

== Reception ==
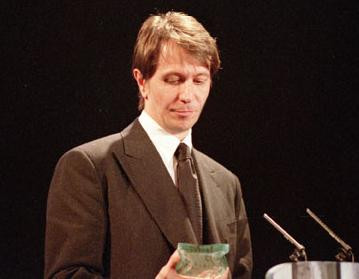
Despite an unfavorable critical response to the film, Gary Oldman's performance has garnered acclaim.

The film received mixed reviews. Chicago Sun-Times critic Roger Ebert gave the film 2 stars out of 4, stating Oldman is "unsurpassable" in portraying depraved characters and Olin is "classy enough to give bimbos a good name", the film is "an exercise in overwrought style and overwritten melodrama, and proof that a great cast cannot save a film from self-destruction." Todd McCarthy of Variety also had praise for the central cast, but called the film a "heavy dose of ultra-violent neo-noir" whose "far-fetched plotting eventually goes so far over the top that [the] pic flirts with inventing a new genre of film noir camp." New York Times journalist Janet Maslin lauded Oldman as a "master craftsman" who gives an "uncanny performance as a slang-spouting American", but concluded, "For all its promise, and for all the brittle beauty of Dariusz Wolski's cinematography, Romeo Is Bleeding eventually collapses under the weight of its violent affectations." A favorable Peter Travers in Rolling Stone called the film a "scorcher of a thriller" with a "knockout performance" by Olin. He added, "It will be a shame if audiences don't get the joke".

In a retrospective review, Dennis Schwartz referred to the film as a "senseless, tasteless and demented postmodern noir", but commended Olin's "menacing" turn as well as the initial interaction between Oldman and Scheider. Randy Miller of DVD Talk wrote, "It's a wild and entertaining ride, to be sure... but not one without its fair share of bumps along the way, and one you probably won't revisit on a regular basis. Still, there's enough here to warrant another look." MSN Movies noted, "While not a great movie – or even a good movie, according to most critics – Gary Oldman's performance as corrupt cop Jack Grimaldi is still highly regarded". Romeo Is Bleeding holds a 27% approval rating on review aggregator Rotten Tomatoes based on 41 reviews, with an average score of 4.7/10.

=== Box office ===
The film debuted poorly at the box office and grossed $3.3 million in total in the US and Canada and $7 million worldwide. It did not fare any better in the United Kingdom, opening on 43 screens and grossing £50,438 in its opening weekend, ranking 12th in the UK and 8th in London.

=== Year-end lists ===
- 6th – John Hurley, Staten Island Advance

=== Awards ===
- Nominee: Best Supporting Actress - Chicago Film Critics Association Awards (Lena Olin)
- Nominee: Best Action Sequence - MTV Awards (Lena Olin)
