= Jersey Girl (song) =

1980 song by Tom Waits

Song by Tom Waits

from the album Heartattack and Vine
- Released: September 1980
- Length: 5:11
- Label: Asylum
- Songwriter: Tom Waits
- Producer: Bones Howe

"Jersey Girl" is a song composed and originally sung by American singer-songwriter Tom Waits from his 1980 album Heartattack and Vine.

== Waits original ==
Waits wrote the song for his future wife Kathleen Brennan, who had been living in New Jersey.

Waits said in a 1980 interview that, "I never thought I would catch myself saying 'sha la la' in a song ... This is my first experiment with 'sha la la.'" Waits' recording includes drums, bass, guitar, keyboards, and glockenspiel, in an arrangement that captures the feeling of the seashore by way of "Under the Boardwalk" or "Spanish Harlem".

The song is included on Waits' compilation albums Bounced Checks (1981), Anthology of Tom Waits (1985), and Used Songs, 1973-1980 (2001). Waits also included a quiet performance of it during his 1999 appearance on VH1 Storytellers.

== Springsteen version ==
The song, performed by Bruce Springsteen and the E Street Band, was released as the B-side of the 1984 single "Cover Me". Springsteen slightly rewrote it to replace a Waits line about "whores on Eighth Avenue" with "the girls out on the avenue", and added a verse about taking "that little brat of yours and drop[ping] her off at your mom's" (This line was originally written for "Party Lights", an out-take from The River, which was not officially released until 2015). The July 9, 1981, performance from this stand was used on the "Cover Me" release. A few weeks later on August 24, Waits joined Springsteen on-stage at the Los Angeles Sports Arena to perform the song together. The July 9 performance of "Jersey Girl" was also used as the closing track of Springsteen's 1986 box set Live 1975–85, as Springsteen and producer Jon Landau felt it accurately represented the final phase of the loose story arc that connected the songs on the album together.

"Jersey Girl" would become a Springsteen favorite, played often in New Jersey and sometimes Philadelphia shows during the 1980s and early 1990s. Its appearances then became even rarer, being picked to open the last of 15 Meadowlands shows in 1999 on the Bruce Springsteen and the E Street Band Reunion Tour – as what The New York Times termed "a reward for [the fans'] faith and perseverance," close the last of 10 shows at New Jersey's Giants Stadium in 2003 on The Rising Tour, and be the next-to-last song in the three-show run at Giants Stadium in 2008 on the Magic Tour. The song was played as the first fan requested song at his October 3, 2009, show and was the final song performed during the last October 9, 2009, show before the demolition of Giants Stadium. It was also the encore at the new Met Life Stadium (replaced Giants Stadium) during his tour in August 2016, accompanied with a fireworks display to wrap up the evening.

Because the Springsteen version received more airplay and because Springsteen was often associated with New Jersey, it was not unusual for people to mistakenly think Springsteen had written it.

The song is sometimes erroneously associated with the "Jersey Girl" cultural stereotype, but in fact it makes no mention of most of the traits — such as big hair — usually associated with that stereotype. One writer for The New York Times stated that "the Jersey girl, the one Tom Waits and Bruce Springsteen sing about, knows she'll get what she wants," and listed Springsteen's wife Patti Scialfa and Governor of New Jersey Christine Todd Whitman as examples that befit the song.

=== Personnel ===
According to authors Philippe Margotin and Jean-Michel Guesdon:

- Bruce Springsteen – vocals, guitar
- Steven Van Zandt – guitar, backing vocals
- Roy Bittan – piano, backing vocals
- Clarence Clemons – maracas, saxophone, backing vocals
- Danny Federici – organ, glockenspiel
- Garry Tallent – bass
- Max Weinberg – drums

== Other covers ==
- Corinne Bailey Rae covered the song on the 2019 compilation Women Sing Waits of various women singing Waits songs.
- Bagatelle covered the song on their 1998 album, Gold.
- Polo Hofer covered the song on his 1984 album, Polovinyl
- Holly Cole included a version on her 1995 album of Tom Waits’ songs. The album is called Temptation.
- Hell Blues Choir covered this song on their 2003 album "Greetings From Hell. The Tom Waits Songbook".
- Joe Vitullo covered this song on his 2023 album "Non Noto"
- Jon Bon Jovi covered this song, YouTube Sept. 22, 2000

== Reception ==
Bill Janovitz writing for AllMusic feels it is one of Waits' most tender songs, and that it captures a feeling of romantic longing despite its somewhat gritty details.
