= Kentucky Avenue =

Song by Tom Waits

from the album Blue Valentine
- Released: September 1978
- Recorded: July 24 – August 26, 1978
- Studio: Filmways/Heider Recording, Hollywood, CA
- Genre: Rock
- Length: 4:49
- Label: Asylum
- Songwriter: Tom Waits
- Producer: Bones Howe

"Kentucky Avenue" is a song written and performed by Tom Waits, and released on Side Two of his 1978 album, Blue Valentine. The song was also included on the 1986 compilation album Asylum Years.

== Lyrics ==
"Kentucky Avenue" contains autobiographical elements. Tom Waits grew up on a street called Kentucky Avenue in Whittier, California. In a 1979 interview, Waits recounted:

I used to walk down Kentucky Avenue collecting cigarette butts. And I finally got me a paper route. I used to get up at 1 o' clock in the morning so I could deliver my papers and still have time to break the law ...

Many of the song's lyrics relate to real people in Waits' childhood. "Mrs. Storm" was a neighbour who would sit with a twelve-gauge shotgun protruding from her kitchen window. Perhaps the strongest autobiographical influence was Waits' childhood friend, a boy named Kipper, who suffered from polio and used a wheelchair. In 1981, Waits elaborated on these memories:

I didn't understand what polio was. I just knew it took him longer to get to the bus stop than me ... Sometimes I think kids know more than anybody. I rode a train once to Santa Barbara with this kid and it almost seemed like he lived a life somewhere before he was born and he brought what he knew with him into this world and so ... it's what you don't know that's usually more interesting. Things you wonder about, things you have yet to make up your mind about. There's more to deal with than just your fundamental street wisdom. Dreams. Nightmares.

The song's closing moments include the line "we'll hop that freight train in the hall." This refers to one of Waits' earliest childhood memories, in which he would imagine that, every night, a freight train would run through the centre of his house.

== Reception ==
Music critic Adrian Denning described "Kentucky Avenue" as "a welcome piano ballad on an album very short on piano."

Mojo listed Waits' vocal performance in the song as one of the 100 greatest voices in the world.
