= Elgy Gillespie =

English-born Irish journalist

- Born: 1948 (age 77–78); London, United Kingdom
- Education: Trinity College, Dublin
- Occupations: journalist, writer
- Writing career
- Language: English
- Years active: 1971–present
- Literary movement: Second-wave feminism

Elgy Gillespie (born 1948) is an English-born Irish journalist and author.

== Early life ==
Gillespie was born in London in 1948, to a Belfast father and an Anglo-German mother. She went to Dublin aged 17, reading English at Trinity College, Dublin.

== Career ==
Gillespie wrote for The Irish Times between 1971 and 1986, for columns including "Women First".

== Personal life ==
Gillespie left Ireland in 1986, and has lived in the U.S. since, mostly in San Francisco.

In 2018, she received treatment for an oligodendroglioma.

== Bibliography ==
=== Irish topics ===
- The Flat-Dweller's Companion (1972)
- The Liberties of Dublin (1973; editor)
- The Country Life Picture Book of Ireland (1982)
- Portraits of the Irish (1986, with Liam Blake)
- Changing The Times: Irish Women Journalists 1969-1981 (2003; editor)
- Vintage Nell: The McCafferty Reader (2005; editor)
- Irish Theater Is Alive and Flourishing (2013)

=== Food writing ===
- You Say Potato! (2001)
- The Rough Guide to San Francisco Restaurants (2003)
