= The Piano Has Been Drinking (Not Me) (An Evening with Pete King) =

Song by Tom Waits

from the album Small Change
- Released: October 1976
- Length: 3:37
- Label: Asylum
- Songwriter: Tom Waits
- Producer: Bones Howe

"The Piano Has Been Drinking (Not Me) (An Evening with Pete King)", often referred to as "The Piano Has Been Drinking", is a song written and performed by Tom Waits. The song first appeared on his 1976 album Small Change, and an extended live version on the 1981 compilation album Bounced Checks.

== Lyrics ==
Throughout the song, Waits imitates a drunkard, spouting nonsense phrases with the piano tune occasionally stumbling over itself, recalling a "somewhat abused, slightly-out-of-tune piano that one would expect to find in the corner of a bar or left out in the rain." Waits repeatedly comments and complains about numerous inanimate objects with such lyrics as "The carpet needs a haircut." The song has been described as "[inhabiting] that late-night hades, the club where you can't find a waitress, 'even with a Geiger counter'; where 'the spotlight looks like a prison break' and the owner has 'the IQ of a fence post.'" The song's full title includes a reference to Pete King, co-founder and club director of Ronnie Scott's Jazz Club, at which Waits performed from May 31 to June 12, 1976.

== Live performances ==
In the mid-1970s, Waits occasionally performed the song as a medley with "Makin' Whoopee." Waits performed the song, in truncated form, on the short-lived US television show, Fernwood 2 Night in 1977, during the promotion for Small Change. The appearance also included a short skit in interview form, premised on a broken-down tour bus, during which Waits asks to borrow money from hosts Martin Mull and Fred Willard. Waits performed an extended version of the song in Dublin in March 1981, which appeared on the 1981 compilation Bounced Checks.

== Reception ==
Patrick Humphries, in his book The Many Lives of Tom Waits, believed "The Piano Has Been Drinking" to be "the archetypal Waits song: the laconic bar-room philosopher delivering pithy lyrics, in a voice that sounds like a garbage crusher." Bill Janovitz, writing for Allmusic, wrote that the song "deflates the myth that there is glory in a life on the road, the darker reality of Kerouac's romanticizing, but it does so without being didactic or even very serious." The song has twice been covered by Dan Hicks & His Hot Licks, for his albums Beatin' The Heat (2000) and Alive & Lickin' (2001).
