= Step Right Up (song) =

Song by Tom Waits

from the album Small Change
- Released: 1976
- Studio: Wally Heider's Studio 3 (Hollywood)
- Genre: Jazz; blues; proto-rap
- Length: 5:43
- Label: Asylum
- Songwriter(s): Tom Waits
- Producer(s): Bones Howe

"Step Right Up" is a song written by Tom Waits and included on his 1976 album Small Change. The song became the subject of a lawsuit between Waits and Frito-Lay Inc., after using a similar-sounding song in one of their commercials without the approval of Waits.

== Lyrics and composition ==
The song is from the point of view of a snake oil-like salesman asking potential customers to "step right up" and purchase an unnamed miracle product. Waits guarantees that the product will "mow your lawn", play a "rhythm master", "deliver pizza", and locate lost slippers, among other miscellaneous things. Waits sings the song in the style of a carnival barker attempting to entice business. Waits wrote the song as a satire of products that claimed to do more than they advertised.

== Reception ==
The song is generally praised for its personality. A 2018 review from Pitchfork states that Tom Waits turns "dark slogans into black magic". For live performances of the song, Waits would use a cash register for the percussion.

== Lawsuit ==
Frito-Lay's logo

In 1988, Frito-Lay released a new flavor of Doritos and sought the licensing to use the song for a radio ad. While Waits had previously done an advertisement for dog food, he vehemently opposed his music being used in advertisements as he considered it to be to selling out. Waits officially declined, stating that the song was meant to make fun of marketing, not be used in it.

Frito-Lay hired Stephen Carter to impersonate the rough and gravely sound of Waits' voice. While the song "Step Right Up" was not used, a similar-sounding jingle was composed with "Step Right Up" serving as the inspiration. Before the commercial aired, then vice-president of Frito-Lay, Robert Grossman called Tracy-Locke, Inc., the advertisement company behind the ad, and wanted to ensure that the song they had composed was different enough than "Step Right Up". When Grossman was reassured that there was little similarity, the commercial aired over 250 radio stations for one month. Another version of the ad was made with a vocalist singing the jingle, but Frito-Lay used the Tom Waits-impersonated version instead.

In 1992, Waits officially filed a lawsuit citing grounds of "misappropriation of his voice". Waits would eventually win this lawsuit, with Frito-Lay owing him over $2 million. By 1999, Waits had received the settlement and joked that he "spent it all on candy".

== Personnel ==
- Tom Waits - vocals, piano
- Jim Hughart – bass
- Shelly Manne – drums
- Lew Tabackin – tenor saxophone

== Cover versions ==
"Step Right Up" has been covered by Violent Femmes for the album Step Right Up: The Songs of Tom Waits, which is named after the song itself.
