= Lead Vocalist (album) =

1993 compilation album by Rod Stewart

Compilation album by Rod Stewart
- Released: 22 February 1993
- Genre: Rock, pop
- Length: 55:00
- Label: Warner Bros.
- Producer: Trevor Horn

Rod Stewart chronology
Vagabond Heart (1991)	Lead Vocalist (1993)	Unplugged...and Seated (1993)

Singles from Lead Vocalist
- 1. "Tom Traubert's Blues" Released: 23 November 1992; 2. "Ruby Tuesday" Released: 8 February 1993; 3. "Shotgun Wedding" Released: 5 April 1993

Lead Vocalist is a compilation album released by Rod Stewart on 22 February 1993. It was released by Warner Bros. Records in the UK (WX 503) and Germany (WEA 9362 45258-1/2), but was never released in the US. Three songs from this album either had previously or would be released as singles: "Tom Traubert's Blues", "Shotgun Wedding", and "Ruby Tuesday".

== Album information ==
Lead Vocalist was released on the heels of Stewart receiving the Outstanding Contribution or Lifetime Achievement Award at the BRITs. "I Ain't Superstitious" was released while Stewart was with The Jeff Beck Group, "Cindy Incidentally", and "Stay with Me" and "Sweet Lady Mary" had all been released on Faces albums.

Lead Vocalist closes with five new releases – all cover versions. The new releases were recorded at Woodstock House in County Wicklow, Ireland and Cherokee Studios in Los Angeles.

== Track listing ==
1. "I Ain't Superstitious" (Willie Dixon) (Previously released on Truth by The Jeff Beck Group) – 4:53
2. "Handbags and Gladrags" (Mike d'Abo) (Previously released on An Old Raincoat Won't Ever Let You Down) – 4:25
3. "Cindy Incidentally" [Rod Stewart, Ron Wood, Ian McLagan) (Previously released on Ooh La La by Faces) – 2:37
4. "Stay with Me" (Rod Stewart, Ron Wood) (Previously released on A Nod Is as Good as a Wink...To a Blind Horse by Faces) – 4:37
5. "True Blue" (Rod Stewart, Ron Wood) (Previously released on Never a Dull Moment) – 3:32
6. "Sweet Lady Mary" (Ronnie Lane, Rod Stewart, Ron Wood) (Previously released on Long Player by Faces) – 5:48
7. "Hot Legs" (Rod Stewart, Gary Grainger) (Previously released on Foot Loose & Fancy Free) – 5:15
8. "Stand Back" (Stevie Nicks) – 5:44
9. "Ruby Tuesday" (Mick Jagger, Keith Richards) – 4:04
10. "Shotgun Wedding" (Roy C) – 3:30
11. "First I Look at the Purse" (Smokey Robinson, Bobby Rogers) – 4:23
12. "Tom Traubert's Blues" (Tom Waits) –6:12

== Personnel ==
- For Tracks 1–7 see the original recordings

=== Tracks 8–12 ===
- Rod Stewart – lead vocals, backing vocals
- Jeff Golub – guitar
- Robin LeMesurier – guitar
- Tim Pierce – guitar
- Paul Jackson Jr. – guitar
- Jeff Baxter – guitar
- Waddy Wachtel – guitar
- Carmine Rojas – bass guitar
- John Pierce – bass guitar
- Trevor Horn – bass guitar, backing vocals
- Dave Palmer – drums
- Eric Caudieux – drums, money jangler
- Kevin Savigar – keyboards, piano
- Anne Dudley – keyboards, string & horn arrangements
- Nicky Hopkins – keyboards
- Paulinho Da Costa – percussion
- Jimmy Roberts – saxophone
- The J.B. Horns – saxophone
- Jimmy Zavala – harmonica
- Mr. Hunter – shotgun
- Alicia Irving, Joseph Powell, Rob Dickins, Arnold Stiefel, The Waters – backing vocals

=== Production ===
- Tracks 8–12 produced by Trevor Horn
- Executive Producer – Rob Dickins
- Engineer – Steve MacMillan, Tim Weidner
- Assistant Engineer – Lorcan Keogh

== Charts ==
=== Weekly charts ===
Chart (1993)	Peak position
Australian Albums (ARIA)	96
Austrian Albums (Ö3 Austria)	7
Dutch Albums (Album Top 100)	17
German Albums (Offizielle Top 100)	14
New Zealand Albums (RMNZ)	32
Swedish Albums (Sverigetopplistan)	27
Swiss Albums (Schweizer Hitparade)	13
UK Albums (OCC)	3

=== Year-end charts ===
Chart (1993)	Position
German Albums (Offizielle Top 100)	72

Singles
Year	Song	Rank
1992	"Tom Traubert's Blues (Waltzing Matilda)"	6(UK), 18(GER)
1993	"Ruby Tuesday"	11(UK), 57(GER)
1993	"Shotgun Wedding"	21 (UK)
