= Foreign Affairs (Tom Waits album) =

Studio album by Tom Waits
- Released: September 13, 1977
- Recorded: July 28–August 15, 1977
- Studio: Wally Heider's Studio 3 (Hollywood)
- Length: 41:53
- Label: Asylum
- Producer: Bones Howe

Tom Waits chronology
Small Change (1976)	Foreign Affairs (1977)	Blue Valentine (1978)

Foreign Affairs is the fifth studio album by singer and songwriter Tom Waits, released on September 13, 1977, on Asylum Records. It was produced by Bones Howe, and featured Bette Midler singing a duet with Waits on "I Never Talk to Strangers".

== Production ==
Bones Howe, the album's producer and engineer, remembers the album's original concept and production approach thus:

"[Waits] talked to me about doing this other material [...] He said, 'I'm going to do the demos first, and then I'm gonna let you listen to them. Then we should talk about what it should be.' I listened to the material and said, 'It's like a black-and-white movie.' That's where the cover came from. The whole idea that it was going to be a black-and-white movie. It's the way it seemed to me when we were putting it together. Whether or not it came out that way, I don't have any idea, because there's such metamorphosis when you're working on [records]. They change and change."

== Artwork ==
Pictured on the cover with Waits is a Native American woman named Marsheila Cockrell, who worked at the box office of The Troubadour in Los Angeles. "She was a girl who was... not a girlfriend but she thought she was a girlfriend."

"For the album cover Waits wanted to convey the film-noir mood that coloured so many of the songs. Veteran Hollywood portraitist George Hurrell was hired to shoot Waits, both alone and in a clutch with a shadowy female whose ring-encrusted right hand clamped a passport to his chest. The back-cover shot of Tom was particularly good, casting him as a slicked-back hoodlum—half matinee idol, half hair-trigger psychopath. The inner sleeve depicted the soused singer clawing at the keys of his Tropicana upright."

== Critical reception ==
Retrospective professional ratings
Review scores
Source	Rating
AllMusic	3.5/5 stars
Christgau's Record Guide	B
Classic Rock	6/10
Mojo	3/5 stars
Pitchfork	7.8/10
Q	3/5 stars
The Rolling Stone Album Guide	3.5/5 stars
Spin Alternative Record Guide	5/10
Uncut	4/5 stars

Village Voice critic Robert Christgau gave a mixed review of Foreign Affairs. He appreciated the Bette Midler duet "I Never Talk to Strangers", "Jack & Neal"'s combination of poetry and jazz, the "mumbled monologue" of "Barber Shop", and the title track, which he described as "Anglophile", but lamented "Potter's Field" for its theatrical music and narrative following "a high-rolling nightstick". He critiqued the album further in Christgau's Record Guide: Rock Albums of the Seventies (1981):

"With his genre sleaze and metaphorical melodrama, Waits is a downwardly mobile escapist who believes that Everyman is a wino and Everywoman an all-night waitress who turns tricks when things get rough. The problem isn't the subjects themselves, but that for all his self-conscious unpretentiousness he inflates them. Which I guess is all we can expect of a schoolteacher's son who's been searching for his own world since he was old enough to think."

== Track listing ==
All tracks written by Tom Waits, except where noted.

Side one
No.	Title	Writer(s)	Length
1.	"Cinny's Waltz" (Instrumental)		2:17
2.	"Muriel"		3:33
3.	"I Never Talk to Strangers"		3:38
4.	"Medley: Jack & Neal/California, Here I Come"	"California, Here I Come" by Joseph Meyer, Al Jolson and Buddy De Sylva	5:01
5.	"A Sight for Sore Eyes"		4:40

Side two
No.	Title	Writer(s)	Length
1.	"Potter's Field"	Words: Waits - Music: Bob Alcivar	8:40
2.	"Burma-Shave"		6:34
3.	"Barber Shop"		3:54
4.	"Foreign Affair"		3:46

== Personnel ==
- Tom Waits – vocals, piano
- Gene Cipriano – clarinet solo on "Potter's Field"
- Jim Hughart – bass
- Shelly Manne – drums
- Bette Midler – vocals on "I Never Talk to Strangers"
- Jack Sheldon – trumpet solo
- Frank Vicari – tenor saxophone solo
