= Blue Valentine (Tom Waits album) =

Studio album by Tom Waits
- Released: September 5, 1978
- Recorded: July 24–August 26, 1978
- Studio: Filmways/Heider Recording, Hollywood, California
- Length: 49:32
- Label: Asylum
- Producer: Bones Howe

Tom Waits chronology
Foreign Affairs (1977)	Blue Valentine (1978)	Heartattack and Vine (1980)

Singles from Blue Valentine
- 1. "Somewhere" Released: August 1978

Blue Valentine is the sixth studio album by singer and songwriter Tom Waits, released on September 5, 1978, on Asylum Records. It was recorded over the course of six sessions from July to August 1978 with producer Bones Howe. Rickie Lee Jones is pictured with Waits on the back cover.

== Production ==
Blue Valentine was recorded in six sessions from July 24 to August 26, 1978, at Filmways/Heider Recording, Hollywood, California. Production was by Bones Howe, with second engineers Geoff Howe and Ralph Osborne. Disc mastering was by Terry Dunavan.

All the songs were written by Tom Waits apart from the opening track, "Somewhere", from the Leonard Bernstein and Stephen Sondheim musical West Side Story.

== Critical reception ==
Professional ratings
Review scores
Source	Rating
AllMusic	3.5/5 stars
Christgau's Record Guide	B
Classic Rock	7/10
Mojo	5/5 stars
Pitchfork	8.3/10
Q	3/5 stars
Record Mirror	4.5/5 stars
(The New) Rolling Stone Album Guide	3/5 stars
Spin Alternative Record Guide	5/10
Uncut	4/5 stars

Don Shewey of Rolling Stone found that Blue Valentine "is as solid a record as Waits has made", and that its best songs "rank high among the sentimental sagas that contain Tom Waits' strongest writing." Reviewing in Christgau's Record Guide: Rock Albums of the Seventies (1981), Robert Christgau wrote that "Waits keeps getting weirder and good for him. As sheer sendup, his 'Somewhere' beats Sid Vicious's 'My Way' his way. But I'm not always sure he understands his gift—these lyrics should be funnier. And 'Romeo Is Bleeding,' easily my favorite among his Chandleroid sagas of tragedy outside the law, is more effective on the jacket than when he underlines its emotional resonance in song. That's not weird at all."

== Track listing ==
All tracks are written by Tom Waits, except "Somewhere" (music by Leonard Bernstein, lyrics by Stephen Sondheim).

Side one
No.	Title	Length
1.	"Somewhere" (from West Side Story)	3:53
2.	"Red Shoes by the Drugstore"	3:14
3.	"Christmas Card from a Hooker in Minneapolis"	4:33
4.	"Romeo Is Bleeding"	4:52
5.	"$29.00"	8:15
Total length:		24:47

Side two
No.	Title	Length
1.	"Wrong Side of the Road"	5:14
2.	"Whistlin' Past the Graveyard"	3:17
3.	"Kentucky Avenue"	4:49
4.	"A Sweet Little Bullet from a Pretty Blue Gun"	5:36
5.	"Blue Valentines"	5:49
Total length:		24:45

== Personnel ==
- Tom Waits - vocals, electric guitar (4–7, 9, 10), acoustic piano (3, 8)
- Ray Crawford (4, 6, 10 [solo]), Roland Bautista (2, 5), Alvin "Shine" Robinson (7, 9) - electric guitar
- Scott Edwards (7, 9), Jim Hughart (4, 6), Byron Miller (2, 5) - bass guitar
- Da Willie Gonga (George Duke) - Yamaha Electric Grand piano (2, 3, 5)
- Harold Battiste - acoustic piano (7, 9)
- Charles Kynard - organ (4, 6)
- Herbert Hardesty (7, 9), Frank Vicari (4, 6) - tenor saxophone
- Rick Lawson (2, 5), Earl Palmer (7, 9), Chip White (4, 6) - drums
- Bobbye Hall Porter - congas (4)
- Bob Alcivar - orchestra

== Charts ==
Chart (1978)	Peak position
Australia (Kent Music Report)	42

== Certifications ==
Region	Certification	Certified units/sales
United Kingdom (BPI)	Gold	100,000^{^}
^{^} Shipments figures based on certification alone.
