= Small Change (Tom Waits album) =

Studio album by Tom Waits
- Released: September 21, 1976
- Recorded: July 15–29, 1976
- Studio: Wally Heider's Studio 3 (Hollywood)
- Genre: Jazz pop
- Length: 49:28
- Label: Asylum
- Producer: Bones Howe

Tom Waits chronology
Nighthawks at the Diner (1975)	Small Change (1976)	Foreign Affairs (1977)

Small Change is the fourth studio album by singer and songwriter Tom Waits, released on September 21, 1976, on Asylum Records. It was recorded in July at Wally Heider's Studio 3 in Hollywood. It was successful commercially and outsold his previous albums. This resulted in Waits putting together a touring band - The Nocturnal Emissions, which consisted of Frank Vicari on tenor saxophone, FitzGerald Jenkins on bass guitar and Chip White on drums and vibraphone. The Nocturnal Emissions toured Europe and the United States extensively from October 1976 till May 1977.

== Production ==
"The album's called Small Change. It's all about ambulance drivers, night watchmen, ticket takers, street sweepers, tattoo parlors, stage door jockeys, shoe string hotels from New York City to Chicago, Buffalo, Los Angeles, all the way from Tuxedo Junction to swing town. Did it in five nights on the corner of Selma and Cahuenga. Recorded complete and direct to 2-track stereo tape." —Tom Waits, 1976. Artist statement used in the album's promotional advertisements.

Small Change was recorded, direct to 2-track stereo tape, July 15, 19–21 and 29, 1976, at Wally Heider's Studio 3 in Hollywood under the production of Bones Howe. A multi-track recording was made as back up, and used when a reference Waits made to actress Jayne Meadows had to be changed. Howe recounted: "We set up at Heider's for that record the same way I used to make jazz records in the 1950s. I wanted to take Tom back to that direction of making records, with an orchestra and Tom in the same room, all playing and singing together. I was never afraid of making a record where the musicians all breathed the same air. Leakage is not a problem. In fact, it's a good thing — it holds a record together... He was always surrounded by the music and the records sound like it. We never used headphones. Never."

=== Music ===
The album featured famed drummer Shelly Manne, and was, like Waits' previous albums, heavily jazz-influenced, with a lyrical style that owed influence to Raymond Chandler and Charles Bukowski as well as a vocal delivery influenced by Louis Armstrong, Dr. John and Howlin' Wolf. The music, for the most part, consists of Waits' gravelly, rough voice, set against a backdrop of piano, upright bass, drums and saxophone. Some tracks have a string section, whose sweet timbre is starkly contrasted to Waits' voice.

"Tom Traubert's Blues" opens the album. Jay S. Jacobs has described the song as a "stunning opener [which] sets the tone for what follows." The refrain is based almost word by word on the 1890 Australian song, "Waltzing Matilda" by A.B. "Banjo" Paterson, although the tune is slightly different.

The origin of the song is somewhat ambiguous. The sub-title, "Four Sheets to the Wind in Copenhagen", seems to indicate that it is about a time that Waits spent in Copenhagen in 1976 while on a tour. There, he apparently met Danish singer Mathilde Bondo. Indeed, in a 1998 radio interview, she confirmed that she met Waits and that they spent a night on the town together. Waits himself described the song's subject during a concert in Sydney, Australia in March 1979: "Uh, well I met this girl named Matilda. And uh, I had a little too much to drink that night. This is about throwing up in a foreign country." In an interview on NPR's World Cafe, aired December 15, 2006, Waits said that Tom Traubert was a "friend of a friend" who died in prison.

Bones Howe, the album's producer, recalls when Waits first came to him with the song:

He said the most wonderful thing about writing that song. He went down and hung around on skid row in L.A. because he wanted to get stimulated for writing this material. He called me up and said, "I went down to skid row ... I bought a pint of rye. In a brown paper bag." I said, "Oh really?" "Yeah - hunkered down, drank the pint of rye, went home, threw up, and wrote 'Tom Traubert's Blues' [...] Every guy down there ... everyone I spoke to, a woman put him there."

Howe was amazed when he first heard the song, and he's still astonished by it. "I do a lot of seminars," he says. "Occasionally I'll do something for songwriters. They all say the same thing to me. 'All the great lyrics are done.' And I say, 'I'm going to give you a lyric that you never heard before.'" Howe offers the following to his aspiring songwriters: "A battered old suitcase to a hotel someplace / And a wound that will never heal." This particular Tom Waits lyric Howe considers to be "brilliant." It's "the work of an extremely talented lyricist, poet, whatever you want to say. That is brilliant, brilliant work. And he never mentions the person, but you see the person."

The song has been recorded by Rod Stewart on two 1993 albums, Lead Vocalist and Unplugged...and Seated under the title "Tom Traubert's Blues (Waltzing Matilda)".

The album's closing song, "I Can't Wait to Get Off Work (And See My Baby on Montgomery Avenue)", has a simple musical arrangement, boasting only Waits' voice and piano, with bass by Jim Hughart. The lyrics are about Waits' first job at Napoleone Pizza House in San Diego, which he began in 1965, at the age of 16.

An excerpt of the opening saxophone solo from "Small Change (Got Rained On with His Own .38)" was used for the opening of BBC Two's Moviedrome in 1988, its first season of screening cult films introduced by Alex Cox.

=== Themes ===
At the time of the recording of Small Change Waits was drinking more and more heavily, and life on the road was starting to take its toll on him. Waits, looking back at the period said:

I was sick through that whole period [...] It was starting to wear on me, all the touring. I'd been travelling quite a bit, living in hotels, eating bad food, drinking a lot - too much. There's a lifestyle that's there before you arrive and you're introduced to it. It's unavoidable.

Waits recorded the album in reaction to these hardships. This is evident in the pessimism and cynicism that pervade the record, with many songs, such as "The Piano Has Been Drinking" and "Bad Liver and a Broken Heart" presenting a bare and honest portrayal of alcoholism, while also cementing Waits' hard-living reputation in the eyes of many fans. The album's themes include those of desolation, deprivation, and, above all else, alcoholism. The cast of characters, which includes hookers, strippers and small-time losers, are, for the most part, night-owls and drunks; people lost in a cold, urban world.

With the album Waits asserted that he "tried to resolve a few things as far as this cocktail-lounge, maudlin, crying-in-your-beer image that I have. There ain't nothin' funny about a drunk [...] I was really starting to believe that there was something amusing and wonderfully American about being a drunk. I ended up telling myself to cut that shit out."

Beyond the serious themes with which the album deals, the lyrics are often also noted for their humour; with songs such as "The Piano Has Been Drinking" and "Bad Liver And A Broken Heart" including puns and jokes in their treatment of alcoholism, with the added humour in Waits' drunken diction.

=== Cover ===
The cover art features Waits sitting in a go-go dancer's dressing room, with a topless go-go dancer standing nearby. It was alleged that the go-go dancer pictured is Cassandra Peterson, who portrayed the iconic Elvira, Mistress of the Dark. Peterson, however, says she's not sure of the authenticity of this claim, stating, "I can't say it's completely not me—I can't say it's not true—but I have absolutely no recollection of doing it, if it is true....I do not remember the '70s, for who-knows-what-all reasons. But anyway, it could be me. There is a possibility. But I just look and look and look at it and go, "It doesn't look exactly like me." I don't know. Maybe it is." Peterson now asserts it is not her on the cover. Apparently it was an LA showgirl who went by the name of Jinx, who worked at Jumbo's Clown Room.

== Reception ==
Professional ratings
Review scores
Source	Rating
AllMusic	4.5/5 stars
Christgau's Record Guide	B−
Classic Rock	9/10
Mojo	5/5 stars
Pitchfork	9.0/10
Q	3/5 stars
The Rolling Stone Album Guide	4/5 stars
Uncut	5/5 stars

Critics gave Small Change generally favorable to highly positive reviews, many considering it on par with or superior to Waits' previous albums.

Robert Hilburn of the Los Angeles Times praised the album, stating that Waits "has not only fulfilled the promise of his early work, but extended it in a way that makes him one of America's most valuable pop performers," and that "by refusing to stay in the safe mold of his first two albums, he enriched his art."

Carl Arrington of the Detroit Free Press praised Small Change as "another wheezy, wonderful collection by the reigning duke of down-and-out," noting that it features "more verbal hooks and turns in every song than most artists use in a career."

When asked in an interview with Mojo in 1999 if he shared many fans' view that Small Change was the crowning moment of his "beatnik-glory-meets-Hollywood-noir period" (i.e. from 1973 to 1980), Waits replied:

Well, gee. I'd say there's probably more songs off that record that I continued to play on the road, and that endured. Some songs you may write and record but you never sing them again. Others you sing em every night and try and figure out what they mean. "Tom Traubert's Blues" was certainly one of those songs I continued to sing, and in fact, close my show with.

In 2000, Small Change was voted number 958 in Colin Larkin's All Time Top 1000 Albums.

=== Sales ===
Small Change became Waits' first album to enter the Billboard 200, reaching No. 89, a peak he would not surpass until 1999's Mule Variations.

== Track listing ==
All songs written and composed by Tom Waits.

Side one
No.	Title	Length
1.	"Tom Traubert's Blues (Four Sheets to the Wind in Copenhagen)"	6:39
2.	"Step Right Up"	5:43
3.	"Jitterbug Boy (Sharing a Curbstone with Chuck E. Weiss, Robert Marchese, Paul Body and The Mug and Artie)"	3:44
4.	"I Wish I Was in New Orleans (In the Ninth Ward)"	4:53
5.	"The Piano Has Been Drinking (Not Me) (An Evening with Pete King)"	3:40

Side two
No.	Title	Length
1.	"Invitation to the Blues"	5:24
2.	"Pasties and a G-String (At the Two O'Clock Club)"	2:32
3.	"Bad Liver and a Broken Heart (In Lowell)"	4:50
4.	"The One That Got Away"	4:07
5.	"Small Change (Got Rained on with His Own .38)"	5:07
6.	"I Can't Wait to Get Off Work (And See My Baby on Montgomery Avenue)"	3:17
Total length:		49:28

== Personnel ==
- Tom Waits – vocals, piano
- Harry Bluestone – violin, concertmaster strings
- Jim Hughart – bass guitar
- Ed Lustgarten – cello, orchestra manager strings
- Shelly Manne – drums
- Lew Tabackin – tenor saxophone
- Jerry Yester – arranger and conductor of string section

== Chart positions ==
Chart (1976)	Peak position
US Billboard 200	89

== Certifications ==
Region	Certification	Certified units/sales
Australia (ARIA)	Gold	35,000^{^}
United Kingdom (BPI)	Silver	60,000^{^}
^{^} Shipments figures based on certification alone.
