= Tom Traubert's Blues =

1976 song by Tom Waits

Song by Tom Waits

from the album Small Change
- Released: September 1976
- Recorded: July 15–29, 1976 at Wally Heider Recording in Hollywood, California
- Genre: Blues
- Length: 6:40
- Label: Asylum
- Songwriter: Tom Waits
- Producer: Bones Howe

"Tom Traubert's Blues (Four Sheets to the Wind in Copenhagen)" (commonly known as "Tom Traubert's Blues" or "Waltzing Matilda") is a song by American musician Tom Waits.

It is the opening track on Waits' fourth studio album Small Change, released in September 1976 on Asylum Records. Written by Waits and produced by Bones Howe, the song's chorus is derived from the Australian folk song "Waltzing Matilda" and its lyrics narrate alcohol abuse, inspired by Waits' own experiences in Los Angeles and Copenhagen.

The song is considered one of Waits' signature songs and was described by Howe as "the work of an extremely talented lyricist". It has since been covered by a number of artists, including Rod Stewart, who released a version of the song on the compilation album Lead Vocalist (1993). Stewart's version was released as a single in 1992 and charted in eight countries upon its release, including the United Kingdom, Ireland, Germany, Sweden, and the Netherlands.

== Origin and recording ==
"Tom Traubert's Blues" was written by Tom Waits while he was living in London in 1976. In an interview on NPR's World Cafe in December 2006, Waits stated that the title character was "a friend of a friend" who had died in prison. The song's subtitle ("Four Sheets to the Wind in Copenhagen") is a reference to the time that Waits spent in Copenhagen, Denmark while on tour in June 1976. In Copenhagen, Waits had met Danish singer and violinist Mathilde Bondo. Bondo performed violin during Waits' appearance on the DR1 TV show Sange Efter Lukketid and said that she "of course had to show him the city – we were in Tivoli and on Christianshavn. It was a lovely night [...] we waltzed a lot" Bondo later said "I'm really proud to have been the muse for his song" and referred to Waits' depiction of Copenhagen as "somewhat ambiguous but it's a wonderful song."

In May 1979, Waits himself confirmed the song's origins during a live performance in Sydney, Australia, stating "I met this girl named Matilda. And uh, I had a little too much to drink that night. This is about throwing up in a foreign country."

However, producer Bones Howe has said that another experience inspired "Tom Traubert's Blues." Recalling the experience, Howe said "he [Waits] went down and hung around on Skid Row in L.A. because he wanted to get stimulated for writing this material. He called me up and said, 'I went down to skid row ... I bought a pint of rye. In a brown paper bag.' I said, 'Oh really?.' 'Yeah – hunkered down, drank the pint of rye, went home, threw up, and wrote 'Tom Traubert's Blues' [...] every guy down there... everyone I spoke to, a woman put him there." Howe recorded and produced "Tom Traubert's Blues" during Small Change's recording sessions. The sessions were held at Wally Heider Studios in San Francisco, California from July 15 to July 29, 1976. The song was recorded direct to ½-inch two-track stereo tape. Waits and Howe decided to record on a two-track console to ensure the song did not sound overproduced. Howe later commented that "jazz is more about getting a good take, not about having a lot of tracks to mix."

== Composition ==
"Tom Traubert's Blues" was written solely by Waits and produced by Bones Howe. The song is in common time (4/4) and has a slow tempo of about 70 beats per minute. It is composed in the key of F major. The song is piano-based and led by Waits but also features Jim Hughart performing bass. A fifteen-piece orchestral ensemble performs on the song, arranged and conducted by Jerry Yester who had produced Waits' debut studio album Closing Time (1973).

The song's lyrics narrate the story of Tom Traubert, "a man who finds himself stranded and penniless in a foreign land." Biographer Jay S. Jacobs has described Traubert as "etched as a sympathetic character, but it's clear that he inhabits a hell of his own making. He'll never make his way home again because any cash he gets his hands on he squanders on drink."

The lyrics to the song's chorus incorporates a significant part of the chorus of the Australian folk song "Waltzing Matilda." Waits explained the reason for choosing to incorporate parts of "Waltzing Matilda" saying, "when you're 'waltzing matilda', you're on the road. You're not with your girlfriend, you're on the bum. For me, I was in Europe for the first time, and I felt like a soldier far away from home and drunk on the corner with no money, lost."

Bones Howe considers the song's lyrics to be "brilliant" and "the work of an extremely talented lyricist." Speaking of the lyrics, Howe has said: "occasionally I'll do something for songwriters. They all say the same thing to me. 'All the great lyrics are done.' And I say, 'I'm going to give you a lyric that you never heard before.' 'A battered old suitcase to a hotel someplace / And a wound that will never heal.'."

== Release and reception ==
"Tom Traubert's Blues" was included as the opening track on Small Change, released in September 1976 on Asylum Records. Upon Small Change's release, the song received largely positive critical acclaim. In more recent years, it has been considered one of Waits' signature songs. Allmusic reviewer Thomas Ward has referred to the song as "without doubt, one of Tom Waits' finest recordings" and described it as "heartbreakingly beautiful, containing some of the artist's finest lyrics, especially in the croaking opening 'wasted and wounded / 'taint what the moon did / got what I paid for now'."

== Live performances ==
"Tom Traubert's Blues" was debuted live on the BBC2 television show The Old Grey Whistle Test on May 3, 1977. It was performed alongside Small Change, another track taken from the album of the same name.

== Rod Stewart version ==
"Tom Traubert's Blues (Waltzing Matilda)"

Single by Rod Stewart

from the album Lead Vocalist
- B-side: "Sailing"; "No Holding Back"
- Released: November 23, 1992
- Length: 6:11
- Label: Warner Bros.
- Songwriter: Tom Waits
- Producer: Trevor Horn

Rod Stewart singles chronology
"Your Song" / "Broken Arrow" (1992)	"Tom Traubert's Blues (Waltzing Matilda)" (1992)	"Ruby Tuesday" (1993)

"Tom Traubert's Blues" was covered by Rod Stewart under the title "Tom Traubert's Blues (Waltzing Matilda)". Released as a single in November 1992 by Warner Bros., it was later included on the compilation Lead Vocalist (1993) and live albums Unplugged...and Seated (1993) and You're in My Heart: Rod Stewart with the Royal Philharmonic Orchestra (2019).

=== Track listings ===
- UK CD single (W0144CDX)
1. "Tom Traubert's Blues (Waltzing Matilda)" (Waits) – 6:11
2. "Sailing" (Sutherland) – 4:22
3. "I Don't Want to Talk About It" (Whitten) – 4:48
4. "Try a Little Tenderness" (Campbell, Connelly, Woods) – 4:29
- European CD single (W0144CD)
1. "Tom Traubert's Blues (Waltzing Matilda)" (edit) (Waits) – 4:30
2. "No Holding Back" (Savigar, Stewart) – 5:43
3. "Downtown Train" (Waits) – 4:39
- German 7-inch single (W0144)
1. "Tom Traubert's Blues (Waltzing Matilda)" (edit) (Waits) – 4:30
2. "No Holding Back" (Savigar, Stewart) – 5:43

=== Charts ===
==== Weekly charts ====
Chart (1992–1993)	Peak position
Australia (ARIA)	82
Austria (Ö3 Austria Top 40)	18
Belgium (Ultratop 50 Flanders)	16
Denmark (IFPI)	7
Europe (Eurochart Hot 100)	21
Germany (GfK)	18
Iceland (Íslenski Listinn Topp 40)	14
Ireland (IRMA)	4
Netherlands (Dutch Top 40)	3
Netherlands (Single Top 100)	4
New Zealand (Recorded Music NZ)	40
Sweden (Sverigetopplistan)	39
Switzerland (Schweizer Hitparade)	9
UK Singles (OCC)	6
UK Airplay (Music Week)	5

==== Year-end charts ====
Chart (1992)	Position
UK Singles (OCC)	73

Chart (1993)	Position
Germany (Media Control)	75
Netherlands (Dutch Top 40)	56
Netherlands (Single Top 100)	47

=== Release history ===
Region	Date	Format(s)	Label(s)	Ref.
United Kingdom	November 23, 1992	7-inch vinyl; CD; cassette	Warner Bros.	
Australia	December 7, 1992	CD; cassette	Warner Bros.	

== Personnel ==
Personnel adapted from Small Change's liner notes.

Musicians

- Tom Waits – vocals, piano
- Jim Hughart – bass

Additional musicians

- Harry Bluestone – violin
- Israel Baker – violin
- Nathan Kaproff – violin
- Nathan Ross – violin
- George Kast – violin
- Murray Adler – violin
- Marvin Limonick – violin
- Alfred Lustgarten – violin
- Sheldon Sanov – violin

Additional musicians

- Sam Boghossian – viola
- David Schwartz – viola
- Allan Harshman – viola
- Kathleen Lustgarten – cello
- Ray Kelley – cello
- Jesse Ehrlich – cello

Technical personnel

- Bones Howe – producer, engineer, mixing
- Geoff Howe – additional engineer
- Bill Broms – additional engineer
- Terry Dunavan – mastering
