= Blackhawk discography =

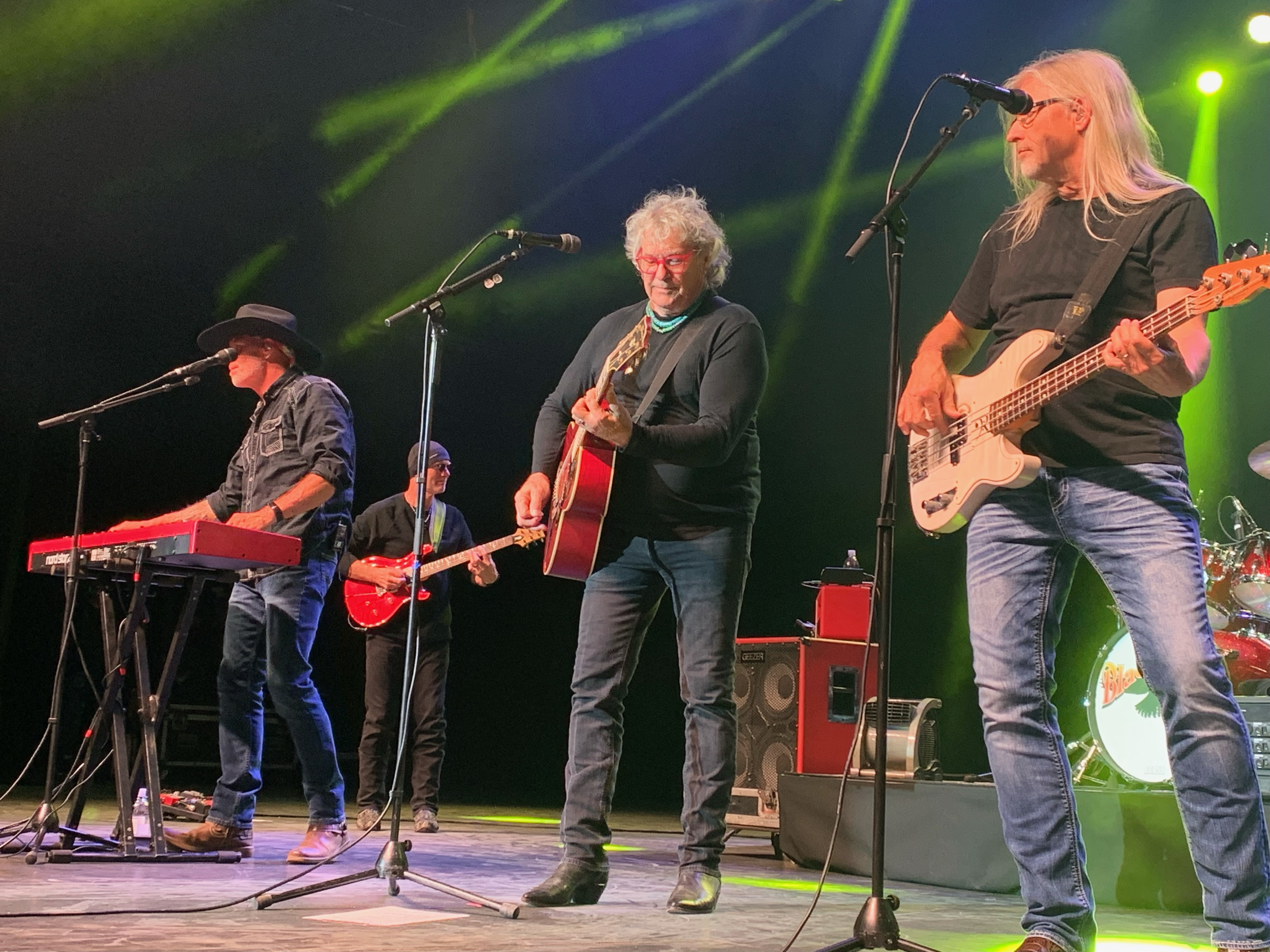
- Blackhawk in 2024
- Studio albums: 6
- Live albums: 1
- Compilation albums: 2
- Singles: 24
- Music videos: 17

American country music band Blackhawk has released six studio albums, two compilation albums, one live album, 24 singles, and 17 music videos. Released in 1994, the band's self-titled debut included five top 40 hits on Hot Country Songs, all but one of which made top 10. Its followup, Strong Enough, produced two more top 10 hits. Although the band never achieved a number one in the United States, two of their songs made number one on the RPM Country Tracks chart in Canada.

== Albums ==
=== Studio albums ===
Title	Album details	Peak positions			Certifications
Title	Album details	US Country	US	CAN Country	Certifications
Blackhawk	Release date: January 31, 1994; Label: Arista Records; Formats: CD, cassette	15	98	—	CAN: Platinum; US: 2× Platinum
Strong Enough	Release date: September 12, 1995; Label: Arista Records; Formats: CD, cassette	4	22	5	CAN: Platinum; US: Gold
Love & Gravity	Release date: July 29, 1997; Label: Arista Records; Formats: CD, cassette	8	79	—	
The Sky's the Limit	Release date: September 29, 1998; Label: Arista Records; Formats: CD, cassette	25	192	11	
Spirit Dancer	Release date: August 27, 2002; Label: Columbia Records; Formats: CD	37	—	—	
Down from the Mountain	Release date: October 13, 2011; Label: Loud & Proud Records; Formats: CD	—	—	—	
Brothers of the Southland	Release date: July 8, 2014; Label: Loud & Proud Records; Formats: CD, download	44	—	—	
The Spirit of Christmas	Release date: October 18, 2019; Label: Mirror Lake Records, BFD; Formats: CD, download	—	—	—	
Blue Highway	Release date: June 24, 2022; Label: Mirror Lake Records, BFD; Formats: CD, download	—	—	—	
"—" denotes releases that did not chart

=== Compilation albums ===
Title	Album details	Peak positions		
Title	Album details	US Country	US	CAN Country
Greatest Hits	Release date: May 16, 2000; Label: Arista Nashville; Formats: CD, cassette	18	152	18
Greatest Hits & More	Release date: October 28, 2014; Label: Loud & Proud Records; Formats: CD, download	—	—	—
"—" denotes releases that did not chart

=== Live albums ===
Title	Album details
Greatest Hits Live	Release date: September 2, 2008; Label: Airline Records; Formats: CD, download
Just About Right: Live From Atlanta	Release date: November 13, 2020; Label: Mirror Lake Records / BFD; Formats: CD, download

== Singles ==
=== As lead artist ===
Year	Single	Peak positions			Album
Year	Single	US Country	US	CAN Country	Album
1993	"Goodbye Says It All"	11	— (Note: "Goodbye Says It All" did not enter the Hot 100, but peaked at number 11 on Bubbling Under Hot 100 Singles, which acts a 25-song extension of the Hot 100.)	29	Blackhawk
1994	"Every Once in a While"	2	—	3	Blackhawk
1994	"I Sure Can Smell the Rain"	9	—	9	Blackhawk
1994	"Down in Flames"	10	—	10	Blackhawk
1995	"That's Just About Right"	7	—	9	Blackhawk
1995	"I'm Not Strong Enough to Say No"	2	— (Note: "I'm Not Strong Enough to Say No" did not enter the Hot 100, but peaked at number 4 on Bubbling Under Hot 100 Singles, which acts a 25-song extension of the Hot 100.)	1	Strong Enough
1995	"Like There Ain't No Yesterday"	3	—	1	Strong Enough
1996	"Almost a Memory Now"	11	—	14	Strong Enough
1996	"Big Guitar"	17	—	8	Strong Enough
1996	"King of the World"	49	—	41	Strong Enough
1997	"Hole in My Heart"	31	— (Note: "Hole in My Heart" did not enter the Hot 100, but peaked at number 23 on Bubbling Under Hot 100 Singles, which acts a 25-song extension of the Hot 100.)	52	Love & Gravity
1997	"Postmarked Birmingham"	37	—	53	Love & Gravity
1998	"There You Have It"	4	41	10	The Sky's the Limit
1999	"Your Own Little Corner of My Heart"	27	— (Note: "Your Own Little Corner of My Heart" did not enter the Hot 100, but peaked at number 13 on Bubbling Under Hot 100 Singles, which acts a 25-song extension of the Hot 100.)	41	The Sky's the Limit
2000	"I Need You All the Time"	40	—	40	Greatest Hits
2001	"Days of America"	37	—	—	Spirit Dancer
2002	"One Night in New Orleans"	51	—	—	Spirit Dancer
2002	"I Will"	—	—	—	Spirit Dancer
2006	"Better at Hello"	—	—	—	For the Sake of the Song (unreleased)
2006	"Who's Gonna Rock Ya"	—	—	—	For the Sake of the Song (unreleased)
2014	"Brothers of the Southland"	—	—	—	Brothers of the Southland
"—" denotes releases that did not chart

=== As featured artist ===
Year	Single	Peak positions	Album
Year	Single	US Country	Album
2005	"Gloryland" (Keni Thomas with Blackhawk)	56	Flags of Our Fathers

== Other charted songs ==
Year	Single	Peak positions	Album
Year	Single	US Country	Album
1998	"We Three Kings (Star of Wonder)"	75	Star of Wonder: A Country Christmas Collection

== Music videos ==
Year	Video	Director
1994	"Goodbye Says It All"	Marius Penczner
1994	"Every Once in a While"	Michael Oblowitz
1994	"I Sure Can Smell the Rain"	Marius Penczner
1995	"That's Just About Right"	Jim Shea
1995	"I'm Not Strong Enough to Say No"	Jim Shea
1996	"Almost a Memory Now"	Jim Shea
1996	"Big Guitar"	Jim Shea
1997	"Hole in My Heart"	Richard Murray
1997	"Postmarked Birmingham"	Deaton Flanigen
1997	"We Three Kings (Star of Wonder)"	
1998	"There You Have It"	Michael Oblowitz
2000	"I Need You All the Time"	David Abbott
2001	"Days of America"	Brent Hedgecock
2002	"One Night In New Orleans"	
2002	"I Will"	
2006	"Who's Gonna Rock Ya"	
2009	"Every Once in a While" (Live)	

== See also ==
- Henry Paul (singer)
- Outlaws (band)
