= Greatest Hits (Blackhawk album) =

Greatest hits album by Blackhawk
- Released: May 16, 2000
- Recorded: 1993–2000
- Genre: Country
- Length: 53:27
- Label: Arista Nashville
- Producer: various

Blackhawk chronology
The Sky's the Limit (1998)	Greatest Hits (2000)	Spirit Dancer (2002)

Singles from Greatest Hits
- 1. "I Need You All the Time" Released: March 6, 2000

Greatest Hits is the first compilation album by American country music band Blackhawk. It includes hits from their first four studio albums, as well as the newly recorded "It Takes a Woman", "I Need You All the Time" and "Ships of Heaven". "I Need You All the Time" was released as a single from the album, peaking at #40 on the country charts in the US in 2000. "Ships of Heaven" was one of the last songs written by band member Van Stephenson before his death.

== Content ==
Greatest Hits includes twelve tracks from the band's first four studio albums: "Goodbye Says It All", "Every Once in a While", "I Sure Can Smell the Rain", "Down in Flames" and "That's Just About Right" from Blackhawk (1994); "I'm Not Strong Enough to Say No", "Big Guitar", "Almost a Memory Now" and "Like There Ain't No Yesterday" from Strong Enough; "Postmarked Birmingham" from Love & Gravity, and "There You Have It" and "Always Have, Always Will" from The Sky's the Limit. Of these, "Always Have, Always Will" was the only one that was never issued as a single. Three of the band's chart singles are not included on this compilation: "King of the World" from Strong Enough, "Hole in My Heart" from Love & Gravity, and "Your Own Little Corner of My Heart" from The Sky's the Limit.

Three new tracks are included as well: "It Takes a Woman", "I Need You All the Time" and "Ships of Heaven". "I Need You All the Time" was the only one to be released to radio, peaking at #40 on the country charts in the US in mid-2000. "Ships of Heaven" was also one of the last songs to be written by Van Stephenson, who died shortly after the album's release.

== "Ships of Heaven" ==
"Ships of Heaven", written by guitarist Van Stephenson, centers around a person who is dying but has lived a full life and therefore does not want his loved ones to "cry for" him when he is gone. He reflects on love he has experienced in life and explains that it was strongest in the end, and that now he will sail "on the ships of heaven" and wait to see his loved ones in the future: "I'll be sailing on the ships of heaven / When the tide rolls out for the last time / You'll find me sailing on the ships of heaven / Waiting for the day I come sailing back to you."

The recording has Wayne Killius on drums and percussion, Randy Threet on bass guitar, Dave Robbins on keyboards and piano, Bobby Huff on keyboards, Dale Oliver on electric and acoustic guitar, B. James Lowry on acoustic guitar and Jonathon Yudkin on violin and mandolin. A "Ships of Heaven" tabernacle choir was formed to sing in the song's background. After recording, Blackhawk lead singer Henry Paul stated that he believed the song was "absolutely amazing" and "probably the best thing [the band has] ever put on tape".

The recorded song was dedicated to Stephenson, who also wrote a thank you to fans, friends and family in the album notes. He died of melanoma on April 8, 2001. Blackhawk announced in March 2009, that it had added the song to its new tour set as the "show stopper".

== Critical reception ==
Giving the album four stars out of five, Maria Dinoia of AllMusic said that Greatest Hits played out like a tribute to Stephenson. She noted the fact that the album started out with the band's first single, "Goodbye Says It All", and that the album represented a "bright" future even without Stephenson. Brian Wahlert of Country Standard Time gave the album a mixed review, saying that it showcased the band's change in sound, from their more traditionally country tracks on their first two albums, to the more pop-oriented material on the next two albums, which he considered substantially weaker. He also considered the three new songs inferior in quality to their early work, especially "Ships of Heaven" and "It Takes a Woman", which he referred to as "uninteresting ballads".

== Track listing ==
No.	Title	Writer(s)	Length
1.	"Goodbye Says It All"	Charlie Black, Bobby Fischer, Johnny MacRae	3:24
2.	"I'm Not Strong Enough to Say No"	Robert John "Mutt" Lange	4:16
3.	"Every Once in a While"	Henry Paul, Van Stephenson, Dave Robbins	3:40
4.	"I Sure Can Smell the Rain"	Walt Aldridge, John Jarrard	3:37
5.	"That's Just About Right"	Jeff Black	4:04
6.	"Big Guitar"	Henry Gross, Paul	2:59
7.	"Almost a Memory Now"	Dale Oliver, Stephenson, Robbins	3:13
8.	"There You Have It"	Steve Bogard, Rick Giles	3:12
9.	"Always Have, Always Will"	Robbins	2:45
10.	"Like There Ain't No Yesterday"	Mark Narmore, Aldridge	3:17
11.	"Postmarked Birmingham"	Phil Vassar, Don Sampson	4:22
12.	"Down in Flames"	Michael Clark, Jeff Stevens	3:45
13.	"It Takes a Woman"	Rob Crosby, Roger Murrah, Kitty Murrah, Philip White	3:19
14.	"I Need You All the Time"	Jimmy Price, Pat Bunch, Shane Teeters	2:47
15.	"Ships of Heaven"	Stephenson	4:47

== Chart performance ==
=== Album ===
Chart (2000)	Peak position
U.S. Billboard Top Country Albums	18
U.S. Billboard 200	152
Canadian RPM Country Albums	18

=== Singles ===
Year	Single	Chart Positions	
Year	Single	US Country	CAN Country
2000	"I Need You All the Time"	40	40
