= Spirit Dancer =

Studio album by Blackhawk
- Released: August 27, 2002
- Recorded: 2001–2002
- Genre: Country
- Label: Columbia Nashville
- Producers: Mike Clute, Rick Giles, Henry Paul, Dave Robbins

Blackhawk chronology
Greatest Hits (2000)	Spirit Dancer (2002)	Greatest Hits Live (2008)

Spirit Dancer is the fifth studio album by American country music band Blackhawk. It was also their only album on the Columbia Records label, and the first recorded after the death of former member Van Stephenson. The tracks "Days of America" and "One Night in New Orleans" were released as singles. "Gloryland" was re-recorded by Keni Thomas (whose version featured backing vocals from BlackHawk themselves) on his 2005 album Flags of Our Fathers. "One Night in New Orleans" was released as a single by The Povertyneck Hillbillies from their self-titled album in 2006.

== Context ==
Prior to Spirit Dancer, BlackHawk had not released a studio album since 1998's The Sky's the Limit, and did not chart a top ten country album since Love & Gravity in 1997. Furthermore, the group was released from their record deal with Arista in June 2000, after the label was bought out by RCA Records. This came shortly after news that lead guitarist Van Stephenson would exit the band to combat cancer. He died the following year. To replace Stephenson, the band added backup members Randy Threet (bass and tenor vocals), Mike Radovsky (drums) and Chris Anderson (guitar) to the lineup. The next month, BlackHawk signed with Columbia Nashville to begin work on a new album, reuniting them with CEO Allen Butler, whom they had previously worked with at Arista, Later in the year, they signed with the Columbia Records branch of Sony Imprint, who went on to release their single "Days of America," a track that was included on Spirit Dancer.

== Content ==
The album begins with the track "One Love", a song performed for Van Stephenson at the end of his life that was played once more at his funeral. It was written by band members Henry Paul and Dave Robbins along with 1990s country music singer-songwriter Billy Montana Upon hearing the song, Stephenson stated "There's your hit—there's the radio song," however the track was never released by the band as a single.

The second track, "One Night in New Orleans" was released as a single, peaking at 51 on country charts in 2002. To date, it was the last charting single for Blackhawk. Written by Gilles Godard, Tim Nichols and Rick Giles, the song caught the attention of band member Henry Paul, who called fellow member Dave Robbins stating "Man, you gotta hear this tune." According to Robbins, upon hearing it he "loved it" and remarked that "it's different from anything we've ever done." Paul reflected on the song, commenting that "it's the lighthearted moment of the record" and is "fun."

The album's next song, "Days of America" was released as a single eleven months prior to the release of Spirit Dancer, soon after the 9/11 attacks. Centered around the plight of workers at a Pittsburgh steel mill, the song peaked at number 37 in 2002. Paul and Robbins, along with Lee Miller, wrote the song in April 2001. Although they stated it was not really "so patriotic" but instead a "testimony to the people who go about making up this place on earth we live," it was featured on the first edition of the Patriotic Country release in 2004.

Written by Paul and Robbins along with former Survivor band member Jim Peterik, the album's fourth track, the title track "Spirit Dancer", was written as a tribute to Van Stephenson. It begins with chants of "I love you" in Cherokee. Robbins noted that the song sounded "like something Van would have written" and Paul noted that the lyrics contain "a very personal and inside message of love" citing the lines: Our hearts weren't ready to let him go / so this is our way to let him know / that we miss him and our love for him will never die.

The fifth track, "I Will" penned by Bonnie Baker and Carol Ann Brown, enchanted Robbins once he heard it, calling the song "a wonderful thing to be saying to somebody", Paul reflected these sentiments by stating that the tune "is a really interesting perspective about how you can put someone else before yourself when it comes to love." It was released as a single in 2002 but did not chart. The "power ballad" previously appeared on Billy Ray Cyrus' 2000 album Southern Rain.

The next song, "Brothers of the Southland" is a tribute to Southern rockers, which according to Paul includes the "Marshall Tucker Band, Allman Brothers, [and] Lynyrd Skynyrd." Robbins, who wrote the song along with Paul and Peterik, stated that what BlackHawk does up on stage today is a part of what those guys (Southern rockers) did."

The seventh track, "Gloryland", was described by About.com "as a country version of Bryan Adams' Summer of '69 that sounds as though it came from a "John Mellencamp album." Paul, who wrote the song along with Robbins and Montana, states that it has "a veiled message" that shows how people have changed yet "still have the child-like wish to be approved." Robbins cites the existence of "the message of the ultimate Gloryland" as what people can relate to in the song. Keni Thomas included a partially rewritten version of the song on his 2005 album Flags of Our Fathers: A Soldier's Story. Thomas' version, which featured backing vocals from Blackhawk, peaked at number 56 that year.

"Forgiveness", written by Paul and Montana, is described by Robbins as his "favorite thing (track) on the record." Paul reflected that the song was his attempt to "balance" his "karma book" and doing his "part to come clean." The next track, "Faith is the Light" was written by Paul, Robbins and singer-songwriter Henry Gross. The song is uptempo and was described by Paul as "kick-ass" and a perfect followup to "Forgiveness" from a "conceptual standpoint." According to Robbins, the track is "positive" and explains "what really moves you on through this life."

Spirit Dancer's 10th song, "I'll Always Love You" is the only track on the album to feature lead vocals from Dave Robbins instead of Henry Paul, who both penned the song along with country songwriter Pat Bunch, who previously authored songs for the band including the single "I Need You All the Time" from the 2000 Greatest Hits. Although Robbins described it as a "different little spot on the record" Paul praised Robbins' vocals stating that it suited his "rather appealing view of love."

The final track of the album, "Leavin' the Land" is about the band's recovery from the loss of Van Stephenson, and its departure from the metaphorical "land of the broken hearted" while living above the "status quo." The song was written by Paul and Robbins as well as country songwriter Lee Thomas Miller, whose work was also displayed on the track "Days of America." The song uses the band's theme to describe a situation where a couple takes chances and promises to never part each other.

== Critical reception ==
Professional ratings
Review scores
Source	Rating
Allmusic -	3/5 stars

Allmusic gave the album three out of five stars and described it as the group's "most personal" release. They commended the title track as "one of several earnest and sincere efforts" but criticized Paul's voice as being "whiny," singling out the songs "Forgiveness" and "Leavin' the Land of the Broken Hearted" as not being "any more deeply felt than the other deeply felt songs on the album" while being "more revealing and touching." The publication stated that the album was one that BlackHawk "had to make" and was a "risk" but "one worth taking" at that stage of the group's career.

Matt Bjorke of About.com praise the album stating "...the group sounds just as good as they did when Van was there. Somewhere, I think Van is smiling in approval."

== Track listing ==
No.	Title	Writer(s)	Length
1.	"One Love"	Billy Montana, Henry Paul, Dave Robbins	3:18
2.	"One Night in New Orleans"	Gilles Godard, Tim Nichols, Rick Giles	3:39
3.	"Days of America"	Paul, Robbins, Lee Thomas Miller	2:58
4.	"Spirit Dancer"	Jim Peterik, Paul, Robbins	4:31
5.	"I Will"	Bonnie Baker, Carol Ann Brown	3:29
6.	"Brothers of the Southland"	Peterik, Paul, Robbins	4:47
7.	"Gloryland"	Paul, Robbins, Montana	3:51
8.	"Forgiveness"	Paul, Montana	3:03
9.	"Faith Is the Light"	Henry Gross, Paul, Robbins	3:50
10.	"I'll Always Love You"	Pat Bunch, Paul, Robbins	3:49
11.	"Leavin' the Land of the Broken Hearted"	Miller, Paul, Robbins	4:06

== Personnel ==
Compiled from liner notes.

=== Blackhawk ===
- Henry Paul — acoustic guitar (on "Days of America", "Brothers of the Southland" and "Gloryland" only), lead vocals
- Dave Robbins — piano, Hammond B-3 organ, keyboards, harmony vocals
- Randy Threet — bass guitar (on "Days of America", "Brothers of the Southland" and "Gloryland" only), harmony vocals

=== Additional musicians ===
On "Days of America", "Brothers of the Southland" and "Gloryland"

- Chris Anderson — electric guitar
- Billy Crane — electric guitar
- David Grissom — electric guitar
- Aubrey Haynie — fiddle, mandolin
- Mike Radovsky — drums

On "One Love", "Spirit Dancer", "I Will", "Faith Is the Light", "I'll Always Love You" and "Leavin' the Land of the Broken Hearted"

- Tim Akers — piano, accordion
- Larry Beaird — acoustic guitar
- Chris Anderson — electric guitar
- David Grissom — electric guitar
- Aubrey Haynie — fiddle, mandolin
- Dale Oliver — electric guitar
- Michael Rhodes — bass guitar
- Lonnie Wilson — drums

On "One Night in New Orleans"

- Larry Beaird — acoustic guitar
- Spady Brannan — bass guitar
- Tommy Harden — drums
- Jeff King — electric guitar
- Tammy Rogers — fiddle
- Catherine Styron — keyboards

On "Forgiveness"

- Larry Beaird — acoustic guitar
- Carl Marsh — keyboards, strings

== Chart performance ==
=== Album ===
Chart (2002)	Peak position
U.S. Billboard Top Country Albums	37

=== Singles ===
Year	Single	Chart Positions
Year	Single	US Country
2002	"Days of America"	37
2002	"One Night in New Orleans"	51
2002	"I Will"	—
