= Stone Country: Country Artists Perform the Songs of the Rolling Stones =

1997 tribute album to the Rolling Stones

Compilation album by various artists
- Released: September 30, 1997
- Genre: Country
- Length: 40:19
- Label: Beyond
- Producer: Various

Stone Country: Country Artists Perform the Songs of the Rolling Stones is a 1997 tribute album to the English rock band The Rolling Stones. It was released in September 1997 via Beyond Music. The album includes eleven country music artists performing renditions of the band's songs.

== Content ==
The Tractors' rendition of "The Last Time" was the project's first single release. It charted at number 75 on Hot Country Songs dated for the week ending October 4, 1997. The project took nearly 18 months to complete.

== Critical reception ==
Jon Johnson of Country Standard Time gave the project a mixed review, criticizing the project for focusing entirely on singles, and saying that the arrangements "add absolutely nothing to the originals", while praising the vocal performances of George Jones and Nanci Griffith, along with the musical arrangement of Blackhawk's cover of "Wild Horses". Stephen Thomas Erlewine of AllMusic rated the project 3 out of 5 stars, finding the arrangements "slick" while praising the vocal performances of Travis Tritt, Blackhawk, and Nanci Griffith.

== Track listing ==
All tracks are written by Jagger/Richards except "Time Is on My Side", written by Jerry Ragovoy and Jimmy Norman.

Stone Country track listing
No.	Title	Performer	Length
1.	"Honky Tonk Women"	Travis Tritt	4:18
2.	"Paint It Black"	Tracy Lawrence	4:21
3.	"Ruby Tuesday"	Deana Carter	3:35
4.	"The Last Time"	The Tractors	3:59
5.	"Jumpin' Jack Flash"	Rodney Crowell	4:01
6.	"Angie"	Sammy Kershaw	4:45
7.	"Wild Horses"	Blackhawk	3:47
8.	"Brown Sugar"	Collin Raye	3:10
9.	"Beast of Burden"	Little Texas	4:50
10.	"No Expectations"	Nanci Griffith	3:56
11.	"Time Is on My Side"	George Jones	2:47
Total length:			40:19

== Personnel ==
"Honky Tonk Women"

- Bekka Bramlett - backing vocals
- David Briggs - producer, arranger, synthesizer
- Pat Buchanan - electric guitar
- Larry Byrom - electric guitar
- Joe Costa - recording
- Tom Hitchcock - recording
- Jim Horn - saxophone
- Bruce Irvine - recording
- Hargus "Pig" Robbins - piano
- Duane Scott - recording
- Summer Smith - backing vocals
- Travis Tritt - lead vocals
- Nancy Lee Tuck - production coordinator
- Steve Turner - drums

"Paint It Black"

- Flip Anderson - producer
- Terry W. Bates - engineering
- Butch Carr - recording, mixing, tambourine
- Tony Green - assistant engineer
- Mike "Frog" Griffith - production coordinator
- Tony Harrell - Hammond organ
- Tracy Lawrence - lead vocals, producer
- Dave Pomeroy - bass guitar
- Brent Rowan - electric guitar
- Milton Sledge - drums
- Joe Spivey - mandolin
- John Willis - acoustic guitar

"Ruby Tuesday"

- Deana Carter - vocals, producer
- Joe Chemay - bass guitar
- J.T. Corenflos - electric guitar
- Dan Dugmore - steel guitar
- Chris Farren - producer, backing vocals
- Larry Franklin - fiddle
- John Hobbs - keyboards
- Ginny Johnson - production coordinator
- Steve Marcantonio - mixing
- Greg Morrow - drums
- Tim Waters - assistant
- Biff Watson - acoustic guitar

"The Last Time"

- Ron Getman - acoustic guitar, Dobro, backing vocals
- Steve Ripley - producer, recording, mixing, lead vocals, electric guitar
- Jamie Oldaker - drums
- Walt Richmond - producer, Steinway & Sons piano, Wurlitzer electric piano, backing vocals
- Casey van Beek - bass guitar, backing vocals

"Jumpin' Jack Flash"

- Tim Coyle - assistant engineer
- Chad Cromwell - drums
- Rodney Crowell - vocals, producer, harmonica
- Kenny Greenberg - twelve-string guitar
- Rob Hajacos - fiddle
- Michael Rhodes - bass guitar
- Daryl Rodbush - assistant engineer
- Vince Santoro - percussion, backing vocals
- Steuart Smith - electric guitar
- David Thoener - recording, mixing
- Greg Wilkinson - production assistant

"Angie"

- Eddie Bayers - drums
- Stuart Duncan - fiddle
- Paul Franklin - steel guitar
- John Kelton - engineering
- Sammy Kershaw - vocals
- Brent Mason - electric guitar
- Paula Montando - assistant engineer
- Hargus "Pig" Robbins - piano, keyboards
- Keith Stegall - producer
- John Willis - acoustic guitar
- Glenn Worf - bass guitar

"Wild Horses"

- Dennis Bellfield - bass guitar
- Blackhawk - producer
  - Henry Paul - lead vocals
  - Dave Robbins - keyboards, backing vocals
  - Van Stephenson - acoustic guitar, backing vocals
- Mark Bright - producer
- Michael Clute - mixing, engineering
- Bobby Huff - drums
- Greg Jennings - acoustic guitar
- Pete Miskinis - assistant engineer
- Dale Oliver - electric guitar
- Jennifer Rose - production coordinator
- Eric Silver - mandolin

"Brown Sugar"

- Derek Bason - assistant
- Kevin Beamish - recording, mixing
- Larry Byrom - electric guitar
- Joe Chemay - bass guitar
- Jerry Douglas - slide guitar, Dobro
- Ginny Johnson - production coordinator
- Collin Raye - lead vocals
- Billy Joe Walker Jr. - producer, acoustic guitar
- Lonnie Wilson - drums
- Reese Wynans - keyboards

"Beast of Burden"

- Ricky Cobble - assistant
- Christy DiNapoli - producer
- Dan Dugmore - steel guitar
- Doug Grau - producer
- John Hampton - recording, mixing
- Julian King - engineering
- Tim Kish - engineering
- Little Texas:
  - Del Gray - drums
  - Porter Howell - electric guitar, acoustic guitar, slide guitar
  - Jeff Huskins - fiddle, keyboards, Hammond organ, backing vocals
  - Dwayne O'Brien - acoustic guitar, backing vocals
  - Duane Propes - bass guitar, backing vocals
  - Tim Rushlow - lead vocals
- Pete Matthews - assistant
- James Stroud - producer
- Brian David Willis - engineering

"No Expectations"

- Ron de la Vega - bass guitar, backing vocals
- Nanci Griffith - lead vocals, acoustic guitar, producer
- James Hooker - piano, Hammond organ
- Doug Lancio - resonator guitar
- Pat McInerney - drums, percussion
- Mark Miller - recording, mixing
- Jim Rooney - producer
- Lee Satterfield - mandolin, backing vocals

"Time Is on My Side"

- David Briggs - producer, arranger
- Glen Duncan - fiddle
- Sonny Garrish - steel guitar
- Tom Hitchcock - recording, mixing
- Bill Hullett - acoustic guitar
- George Jones - vocals
- Nashville String Machine - strings
  - David Angell, David Davidson, Connie Ellisor, Carl Gorodetzky, Pamela Sixfin, Alan Umstead, Gary Vanosdale - violins
  - John Catchings, Bob Mason - cellos
  - Jim Grosjean - viola
- Eric Pinson - recording, mixing
- Norbert Putnam - bass guitar
- John Wesley Ryles - backing vocals
- Nancy Lee Tuck - production assistant
- Steve Turner - drums
- Cindy Walker - backing vocals
- Bergen White - backing vocals
- Dennis Wilson - backing vocals
- Norro Wilson - backing vocals
- Curtis Wright - backing vocals
- Curtis Young - backing vocals
- Reggie Young - electric guitar

== Charts ==
Chart (1997)	Peak position
US Top Country Albums (Billboard)	22
