= Hole in My Heart (Blackhawk song) =

Single by Blackhawk

from the album Love & Gravity
- B-side: "She Dances with Her Shadow"
- Released: June 28, 1997
- Genre: Country
- Length: 3:59
- Label: Arista Nashville
- Songwriter(s): Van Stephenson, Dave Robbins, Desmond Child
- Producer(s): Mark Bright, Michael D. Clute

Blackhawk singles chronology
"King of the World" (1996)	"Hole in My Heart" (1997)	"Postmarked Birmingham" (1997)

"Hole in My Heart" is a song recorded by American country music group Blackhawk. It was released in June 1997 as first single from the album Love & Gravity. The song reached #31 on the Billboard Hot Country Singles & Tracks chart. The song was written by group members Van Stephenson and Dave Robbins, along with Desmond Child.

== Critical reception ==
An uncredited review in Billboard called the song "infectious" and praised the use of vocal harmony.

== Chart performance ==
Chart (1997)	Peak position
US Hot Country Songs (Billboard)	31
US Bubbling Under Hot 100 (Billboard)	23
Canadian RPM Country Tracks	52
