= I Sure Can Smell the Rain =

Single by Blackhawk

from the album Blackhawk
- B-side: "Stone by Stone"
- Released: August 22, 1994
- Recorded: 1993
- Genre: Country
- Length: 3:37
- Label: Arista Nashville
- Songwriters: Walt Aldridge; John Jarrard
- Producers: Mark Bright; Tim DuBois

Blackhawk singles chronology
"Every Once in a While" (1994)	"I Sure Can Smell the Rain" (1994)	"Down in Flames" (1994)

"I Sure Can Smell the Rain" is a song written by Walt Aldridge and John Jarrard, and recorded by American country music band Blackhawk. It was released in August 1994 as the third single from their self-titled debut album. It peaked at number 9 on both the United States Billboard Hot Country Singles & Tracks and the Canadian RPM Country Tracks charts.

== Content ==
The song is an introspective ballad about a relationship falling apart.

== Music video ==
The music video was directed by Marius Penczner, who also directed the video for "Goodbye Says It All".

== Chart performance ==
The song entered the Billboard Hot Country Songs chart on the week of September 2, 1994, and peaked at number 9 on the week of November 12, 1994.

Chart (1994)	Peak position
Canada Country Singles (RPM)	8
US Hot Country Songs (Billboard)	9

=== Year-end charts ===
Chart (1994)	Position
Canada Country Tracks (RPM)	95
