= Every Once in a While =

Single by Blackhawk

from the album Blackhawk
- B-side: "One More Heartache"
- Released: April 4, 1994
- Recorded: 1993
- Genre: Country
- Length: 3:40
- Label: Arista Nashville
- Songwriters: Henry Paul; Dave Robbins; Van Stephenson
- Producers: Mark Bright; Tim DuBois

Blackhawk singles chronology
| "Goodbye Says It All" (1993) | "Every Once in a While" (1994) | "I Sure Can Smell the Rain" (1994) |

"Every Once in a While" is a song recorded by American country music band Blackhawk. It was released in April 1994 as the second single from their self-titled debut album. It peaked at number 2 on the U.S. Billboard Hot Country Singles & Tracks chart, and at number 3 on Canadian RPM Country Tracks chart. The song was written by all three members of the band.

== Content ==
The song's narrator asks a former lover if she still thinks about him, and she says every once in a while. In reality she constantly thinks about their old relationship and wants to return to the way things were. It is in the key of E major.

== Critical reception ==
Deborah Evans Price of Billboard magazine reviewed the song favorably, saying that the trio "blends sharp hooks and heavenly harmony on this satisfying sophomore single." She goes on to say that Paul's voice "grows on you, and that's a good thing, because it looks like BlackHawk is going to be around for a while."

== Music video ==
The music video was directed by Michael Oblowitz.

== Chart performance ==
"Every Once in a While" debuted at number 74 on the Billboard Hot Country Singles & Tracks chart for the week of April 16, 1994, and peaked at number 2 on the week of July 23, 1994.

| Chart (1994) | Peak position |
|---|---|
| Canada Country Singles (RPM) | 3 |
| US Hot Country Songs (Billboard) | 2 |

=== Year-end charts ===
| Chart (1994) | Position |
|---|---|
| Canada Country Tracks (RPM) | 24 |
| US Country Songs (Billboard) | 13 |
