= Shannon (song) =

Single by Henry Gross

from the album Release
- B-side: "Pokey"
- Released: February 1976
- Genre: Soft rock
- Length: 3:50
- Label: Lifesong
- Songwriter: Henry Gross
- Producers: Terry Cashman and Tommy West for Cashwest Productions, Inc.

Henry Gross singles chronology
"One More Tomorrow" (1975)	"Shannon" (1976)	"Springtime Mama" (1976)

"Shannon" is a 1976 song by Henry Gross. It became an international hit, reaching #6 and achieving gold record status on the U.S. Billboard Hot 100 and #5 on the Cash Box Top 100. The song reached #1 in Canada and New Zealand.

"Shannon" was written about the death of a pet dog that belonged to Beach Boys member Carl Wilson. While touring with the Beach Boys in 1975, Gross visited Wilson's home in Los Angeles and in conversation said he had a dog named Shannon. Wilson replied that he, too, had a dog named Shannon, that had recently been killed when hit by a car. However, Wilson's dog was an Irish Setter.

The single went gold in the U.S. and became a worldwide hit, reaching #6 on the U.S. Billboard Hot 100 and #5 on the Cash Box Top 100 in 1976. In Canada it reached #1. "Shannon" also reached #1 in New Zealand, but peaked only at #32 in the UK.

== Musicians ==
- Henry Gross: vocals, electric guitar, acoustic guitar, background vocals
- Allan Schwartzberg: drums
- George Devens: percussion
- Warren Nichols: bass
- Philip Aaberg: piano, electric piano
- Mike Corbett, Marty Nelson, Tommy West: background vocals

== The Casey Kasem incident ==
"Shannon" is remembered for being the subject of a profanity-laced tirade by American Top 40 host Casey Kasem, while recording the September 14, 1985 show. A listener from Cincinnati, Ohio had requested "Shannon" as a "Long-Distance Dedication" (a regular feature of the show) to his own recently deceased dog, named Snuggles. Kasem was upset that the show's producers had placed the dedication immediately following the Pointer Sisters' hit "Dare Me", an uptempo song that he considered a poor lead-in to a sad song such as "Shannon". The rant did not air in the broadcast but it eventually found its way to the internet. Despite Kasem's rant, the placement of the song within the countdown remained unchanged.

== Chart performance ==
=== Weekly charts ===
Chart (1976)	Peak position
Australia KMR	20
Canada RPM Top Singles	1
Canada RPM Adult Contemporary	1
New Zealand	1
UK	32
U.S. Billboard Hot 100	6
U.S. Billboard Adult Contemporary	13
U.S. Cash Box Top 100	5

=== Year-end charts ===
Chart (1976)	Rank
Canada	20
New Zealand	5
U.S. Billboard	47
U.S. Cash Box	60

== See also ==
- List of 1970s one-hit wonders in the United States
