= Almost a Memory Now =

Single by Blackhawk

from the album Strong Enough
- B-side: "Cast Iron Heart"
- Released: February 12, 1996
- Recorded: 1995
- Genre: Country
- Length: 3:17
- Label: Arista Nashville
- Songwriters: Dale Oliver; Van Stephenson; Dave Robbins
- Producer: Mark Bright

Blackhawk singles chronology
"Like There Ain't No Yesterday" (1995)	"Almost a Memory Now" (1996)	"Big Guitar" (1996)

"Almost a Memory Now" is a song written by Van Stephenson, Dave Robbins, and Dale Oliver, recorded by American country music band Blackhawk. It was released in February 1996 as the third single from their album Strong Enough. It peaked at #11 on the United States Billboard Hot Country Singles & Tracks, and #14 on the Canadian RPM Country Tracks.

== Content ==
The song's narrator confirms that his former lover now that she's gone is "almost a memory now."

== Critical reception ==
Deborah Evans Price, of Billboard magazine reviewed the song favorably, calling it a "stunning ode to lost love." She goes on to call the production "full and rich, buoyed by the trio's outstanding harmonies and accented by the tasty mandolin flourishes that are part of the act's distinctive sound."

== Music video ==
The music video was directed by Jim Shea/Michael Salomon and premiered in early 1996. It was filmed in New Orleans, Louisiana.

== Chart performance ==
"Almost a Memory Now" debuted at number 61 on the U.S. Billboard Hot Country Singles & Tracks for the week of February 24, 1996.

Chart (1996)	Peak position
Canada Country Singles (RPM)	14
US Hot Country Songs (Billboard)	11
