= Big Guitar =

Single by Blackhawk

from the album Strong Enough
- B-side: "Any Man with a Heartbeat"
- Released: June 3, 1996
- Recorded: 1995
- Genre: Country
- Length: 2:57
- Label: Arista Nashville
- Songwriters: Henry Gross, Henry Paul
- Producer: Mark Bright

Blackhawk singles chronology
"Almost a Memory Now" (1996)	"Big Guitar" (1996)	"King of the World" (1996)

"Big Guitar" is a song written by Henry Gross and Henry Paul, and recorded by American country music band Blackhawk. It was released in June 1996 as the fourth single from their album Strong Enough. It peaked at number 17 on the United States Billboard Hot Country Singles & Tracks chart while it was a top ten in Canada, peaking at number 8 there.

== Music video ==
The music video was directed by Jim Shea/Michael Salomon and premiered in mid-1996.

== Chart performance ==
"Big Guitar" debuted at number 62 on the U.S. Billboard Hot Country Singles & Tracks for the week of June 15, 1996.

Chart (1996)	Peak position
Canada Country Singles (RPM)	8
US Hot Country Songs (Billboard)	17

=== Year-end charts ===
Chart (1996)	Position
Canada Country Tracks (RPM)	93
