= The Sky's the Limit (Blackhawk album) =

Studio album by BlackHawk
- Released: September 29, 1998
- Recorded: 1998
- Genre: Country
- Length: 39:10
- Label: Arista Nashville
- Producer: Tim DuBois, Mark Bright

BlackHawk chronology
Love & Gravity (1997)	The Sky's the Limit (1998)	Greatest Hits (2000)

Singles from The Sky's the Limit
- 1. "There You Have It" Released: August 17, 1998; 2. "Your Own Little Corner of My Heart" Released: February 26, 1999

The Sky's the Limit is the fourth studio album released by American country music band BlackHawk. Their final studio album for Arista Nashville, it features the singles "There You Have It" and "Your Own Little Corner of My Heart", which respectively reached #4 and #27 on the Hot Country Songs charts. "There You Have It" was also a number 41 on the Billboard Hot 100. It was also the last album to feature member Van Stephenson, who left the band in 2000 to focus on his battle with melanoma until his death from the disease in 2001.

== Critical reception ==
Brian Wahlert of Country Standard Time reviewed this project favorably, praising the "high-energy" sound and the lyrics of the track "Who Am I Now" in particular. Thom Owens of AllMusic stated of this album that "they have more confidence, not only in their performances but in the way they merge their pop songwriting instincts with more authentic country instrumentation."

== Track listing ==
No.	Title	Writer(s)	Length
1.	"Your Own Little Corner of My Heart"	Walt Aldridge, Brad Crisler	3:25
2.	"Who Am I Now"	Charlie Black, Layng Martine Jr.	3:15
3.	"There You Have It"	Steve Bogard, Rick Giles	3:12
4.	"In My Heart of Hearts"	Byron Hill, Annie Roboff	3:40
5.	"Nobody Knows What to Say"	Bogard, Jeff Stevens	3:45
6.	"Goin' Down Fightin'"	Bill Douglas, Noah Gordon, Henry Paul	3:00
7.	"Walkin' on Water"	Randy Albright, Ben Hayslip	3:34
8.	"Always Have, Always Will"	Dave Robbins	2:46
9.	"When I Find It, I'll Know It"	Gary Burr, Chris Farren	3:37
10.	"Think Again"	Van Stephenson	4:50
11.	"The Last Time"	Burr, Sharon Vaughn, Paul Young	4:01

== Chart performance ==
=== Album ===
Chart (1998)	Peak position
U.S. Billboard Top Country Albums	25
U.S. Billboard 200	192
Canadian RPM Country Albums	11

=== Singles ===
Year	Single	Chart Positions		
Year	Single	US Country	US	CAN Country
1998	"There You Have It"	4	41	10
1999	"Your Own Little Corner of My Heart"	27	113	41

== Personnel ==
=== BlackHawk ===
- Henry Paul – lead vocals (except "Always Have, Always Will"), acoustic guitar, mandolin
- Dave Robbins – baritone vocals, lead vocals on "Always Have, Always Will", keyboards, piano
- Van Stephenson – tenor vocals, guitar, lead vocals on "Think Again"

=== Additional musicians ===
- Tim Akers – synthesizer strings, accordion
- Dave Turnbull - background vocals on "Your Own Little Corner of My Heart"
- Paul Franklin - steel guitar
- Aubrey Haynie – fiddle
- Dann Huff – electric guitar
- Greg Jennings – acoustic guitar, electric guitar
- Brent Mason – electric guitar
- Terry McMillan – percussion, harmonica
- Eric Silver – mandolin
- Lonnie Wilson – drums
- Glenn Worf – bass guitar
- "Monkey Boy", Chris Rowe, Ema Jean Bean, Bobbi Bean, Jenny Johnson – hand claps on "When I Find It, I'll Know It"
