= Postmarked Birmingham =

Single by Blackhawk

from the album Love & Gravity
- B-side: "It Ain't About Love Anymore"
- Released: October 18, 1997
- Genre: Country
- Length: 4:20
- Label: Arista Nashville
- Songwriter(s): Phil Vassar, Don Sampson
- Producer(s): Mark Bright, Michael D. Clute

Blackhawk singles chronology
"Hole in My Heart" (1997)	"Postmarked Birmingham" (1997)	"There You Have It" (1998)

"Postmarked Birmingham" is a song recorded by American country music group Blackhawk. It was released in October 1997 as the second single from the album Love & Gravity. The song reached number 37 on the Billboard Hot Country Singles & Tracks chart. The song was written by Phil Vassar and Don Sampson.

== Content ==
The song is a mid-tempo ballad accompanied mainly by piano. In it, the narrator states that his lover has left him, and that the only "clue" she has given him is a letter that is "postmarked Birmingham".

== Critical reception ==
A review in Billboard praised Henry Paul's lead vocal, his bandmates' harmonies, and the "understated" production, while also making note of the "direct and appealingly conversational" lyrics.

== Chart performance ==
Chart (1997)	Peak position
US Hot Country Songs (Billboard)	37
Canadian RPM Country Tracks	53
