= Down in Flames (Blackhawk song) =

Single by Blackhawk

from the album Blackhawk
- B-side: "Between Ragged and Wrong"
- Released: December 5, 1994
- Recorded: 1993
- Genre: Country
- Length: 3:44
- Label: Arista Nashville
- Songwriters: Michael Clark; Jeff Stevens
- Producers: Mark Bright; Tim DuBois

Blackhawk singles chronology
"I Sure Can Smell the Rain" (1994)	"Down in Flames" (1994)	"That's Just About Right" (1995)

"Down in Flames" is a song written by Michael Clark and Jeff Stevens, and recorded by American country music band Blackhawk. It was released in December 1994 as the fourth single from their self-titled debut album. It peaked at number 10 on both the United States Billboard Hot Country Singles & Tracks and the Canadian RPM Country Tracks charts.

== Critical reception ==
Deborah Evans Price, of Billboard magazine reviewed the song favorably, calling it "an incendiary love affair." She goes on to say that the song is "marked by tight harmonies and anchored by Henry Paul's breathy lead vocal."

== Chart performance ==
Chart (1994–1995)	Peak position
Canada Country Singles (RPM)	10
US Hot Country Songs (Billboard)	10

=== Year-end charts ===
Chart (1995)	Position
Canada Country Tracks (RPM)	96
