= Like There Ain't No Yesterday =

Single by Blackhawk

from the album Strong Enough
- B-side: "A Kiss Is Worth a Thousand Words"
- Released: November 6, 1995
- Recorded: 1995
- Genre: Country
- Length: 3:17
- Label: Arista Nashville
- Songwriters: Walt Aldridge, Mark Narmore
- Producer: Mark Bright

Blackhawk singles chronology
"I'm Not Strong Enough to Say No" (1995)	"Like There Ain't No Yesterday" (1995)	"Almost a Memory Now" (1996)

"Like There Ain't No Yesterday" is a song recorded by American country music band Blackhawk. It was released in November 1995 as the second single from their album Strong Enough. It peaked at number 3 on the United States Billboard Hot Country Singles & Tracks, while it was their second number-one hit in Canada. The song was written by Walt Aldridge and Mark Narmore.

== Content ==
The song's narrator has lost a former lover in the past, but he knows that that was then, and he decides to find someone new, and love her like there ain't no yesterday.

== Critical reception ==
Deborah Evans Price, of Billboard magazine reviewed the song favorably, saying that Paul's voice grabs you and pulls you into this well-written tune "from the a capella opening line." She goes on to say that Robbins and Van Stephenson "add their considerable talents, and the result is one of the best country singles this year."

== Chart performance ==
"Like There Ain't No Yesterday" debuted at number 71 on the Billboard Hot Country Singles & Tracks chart for the week of November 11, 1995, and peaked at number 3 on the week of February 17, 1996. It reached number 1 on the RPM Country Tracks chart in Canada on the week of February 26, 1996.

Chart (1995–1996)	Peak position
Canada Country Singles (RPM)	1
US Hot Country Songs (Billboard)	3

=== Year-end charts ===
Chart (1996)	Position
Canada Country Tracks (RPM)	30
US Country Songs (Billboard)	73
