= There You Have It (song) =

Single by Blackhawk

from the album The Sky's the Limit
- B-side: "When I Find It, I'll Know It"
- Released: August 17, 1998
- Recorded: 1998
- Genre: Country
- Length: 3:12
- Label: Arista Nashville
- Songwriters: Steve Bogard; Rick Giles
- Producers: Tim DuBois; Mark Bright

Blackhawk singles chronology
"Postmarked Birmingham" (1997)	"There You Have It" (1998)	"Your Own Little Corner of My Heart" (1999)

"There You Have It" is a song written by Steve Bogard and Rick Giles, and recorded by American country music band Blackhawk. It was released in August 1998 as the lead-off single to their fourth album The Sky's the Limit. It peaked at number 4 on the United States Billboard Hot Country Singles & Tracks chart, and number 10 on the Canadian RPM' Country Tracks chart. It also reached number 41 on the Billboard Hot 100, the band's only entry on that chart.

== Music video ==
The music video was directed by Michael Oblowitz and premiered in September 1998. It was filmed in Livingston, Montana.

== Chart performance ==
"There You Have It" debuted at number 56 on the U.S. Billboard Hot Country Singles & Tracks for the week of August 29, 1998.

Chart (1998–1999)	Peak position
Canada Country Singles (RPM)	10
US Billboard Hot 100	41
US Hot Country Songs (Billboard)	4

=== Year-end charts ===
Chart (1999)	Position
Canada Country Tracks (RPM)	98
US Country Songs (Billboard)	49
