= Johnny MacRae =

American music composer

Johnny MacRae (February 15, 1929 – July 3, 2013), born Fred A. MacRae, nicknamed "Dog" was an American country music composer credited with 235 songs released by recording artists including Ray Charles, George Jones, and Reba McEntire. His best known songs include "You Can't Make a Heart Love Somebody" (George Strait), "Tonight the Heartache's on Me" (Dixie Chicks), "I'd Love to Lay You Down" (Conway Twitty), "I Still Believe in Waltzes" (Loretta Lynn & Conway Twitty), "When You Leave That Way You Can Never Go Back" (Confederate Railroad), "Goodbye Says It All" (Blackhawk), and "Living Proof" (Ricky Van Shelton).

MacRae was a native of Independence, Missouri. He began composing at age 30. He served in the U.S. Navy for 15 years and on his free time he wrote songs and fronted a rockabilly band. He moved to Nashville in 1963 and eventually became head of Screen Gems Music Publishing (Nashville office) from 1976 to 1984, then became vice president of Combine Music and later wrote for Chappell Music. In 2003, his song, "I'd Be Better Off (in a Pine Box)" was included in CMT's list of "100 Greatest Country Songs".
