= Strong Enough (Blackhawk album) =

Studio album by Blackhawk
- Released: September 12, 1995
- Genre: Country
- Length: 34:33
- Label: Arista Nashville
- Producer: Mark Bright

Blackhawk chronology
BlackHawk (1994)	Strong Enough (1995)	Love & Gravity (1997)

Singles from Strong Enough
- 1. "I'm Not Strong Enough to Say No" Released: July 10, 1995; 2. "Like There Ain't No Yesterday" Released: November 6, 1995; 3. "Almost a Memory Now" Released: February 12, 1996; 4. "Big Guitar" Released: June 3, 1996; 5. "King of the World" Released: October 1996

Strong Enough is the second studio album by American country music band Blackhawk, released in 1995. It features the singles "I'm Not Strong Enough to Say No", "Like There Ain't No Yesterday", "Almost a Memory Now", "Big Guitar", and "King of the World", which respectively reached numbers 2, 3, 11, 17, and 49 on the Hot Country Songs charts. The album itself earned RIAA gold certification for sales of 500,000 copies.

The track "Cast Iron Heart" was previously recorded by Pearl River on their 1993 album Find Out What's Happening, and would later be recorded by Linda Davis on her 1996 album Some Things Are Meant to Be. In addition, "Bad Love Gone Good" was previously recorded by John Anderson on 1993's Solid Ground.

== Critical reception ==
Of this album, Stephen Thomas Erlewine wrote in AllMusic that it "finds the group consolidating their strengths as songwriters and performers. Throughout the album, the group turns in first-rate songs and tight performances, distinguished by their strong harmonies." An uncredited Billboard review praised the energy of Paul's vocal delivery, as well as the variety of songwriters.

== Track listing ==
No.	Title	Writer(s)	Length
1.	"Big Guitar"	Henry Gross, Henry Paul	2:58
2.	"Like There Ain't No Yesterday"	Walt Aldridge, Mark Narmore	3:18
3.	"Cast Iron Heart"	Dennis Linde	3:28
4.	"I'm Not Strong Enough to Say No"	Robert John "Mutt" Lange	4:15
5.	"Almost a Memory Now"	Dale Oliver, Van Stephenson, Dave Robbins	3:17
6.	"King of the World"	Jeff Black	3:22
7.	"Bad Love Gone Good"	Paul, Robbins, Stephenson	3:47
8.	"Any Man With a Heartbeat"	Charlie Black, Layng Martine Jr.	3:23
9.	"A Kiss Is Worth a Thousand Words"	Paul, Robbins, Stephenson	3:09
10.	"Hook, Line and Sinker"	Linde	3:31

== Chart performance ==
=== Weekly charts ===
Chart (1995)	Peak position
Canadian Country Albums (RPM)	5
US Billboard 200	22
US Top Country Albums (Billboard)	4

=== Year-end charts ===
Chart (1995)	Position
US Top Country Albums (Billboard)	54
Chart (1996)	Position
US Top Country Albums (Billboard)	32

=== Singles ===
Year	Single	Chart Positions		
Year	Single	US Country	US	CAN Country
1995	"I'm Not Strong Enough to Say No"	2	104	1
1995	"Like There Ain't No Yesterday"	3	—	1
1996	"Almost a Memory Now"	11	—	14
1996	"Big Guitar"	17	—	8
1996	"King of the World"	49	—	41

== Personnel ==
Compiled from liner notes.

=== Blackhawk ===
- Henry Paul – lead vocals, acoustic guitar
- Dave Robbins – keyboard, baritone vocals
- Van Stephenson – tenor vocals

=== Additional musicians ===
- Mike Chapman - bass guitar
- Bobby Huff - drums
- Dann Huff - electric guitar
- Kenny Malone - percussion
- Carl Marsh - programming
- Dale Oliver - electric guitar
- Danny Parks - additional electric guitar
- Kip Raines - additional drums
- Eric Silver - mandolin
- Joe Spivey - fiddle
- Biff Watson - acoustic guitar
- Lonnie Wilson - drums

=== Technical ===
- Mark Bright - production
- Mike Clute - associate production, recording, mixing
- Tim DuBois - executive production
- Hank Williams - mastering
