= I'm Not Strong Enough to Say No =

Single by Blackhawk

from the album Strong Enough
- B-side: "A Kiss Is Worth a Thousand Words"
- Released: July 10, 1995
- Recorded: 1995
- Genre: Country
- Length: 3:46 (radio edit); 4:15 (album version)
- Label: Arista Nashville
- Songwriter: Robert John "Mutt" Lange
- Producer: Mark Bright

Blackhawk singles chronology
"That's Just About Right" (1995)	"I'm Not Strong Enough to Say No" (1995)	"Like There Ain't No Yesterday" (1995)

"I'm Not Strong Enough to Say No" is a song written by Robert John "Mutt" Lange and recorded by American country music band Blackhawk. It was released in July 1995 as the lead-off single from their album Strong Enough. It peaked at number 2 on the United States Billboard Hot Country Singles & Tracks, while it was their first number-one hit in Canada.

== Content ==
The song's narrator finds himself falling for another man's wife. As they spend time together, he likens being around her to being on "slippery ice", and fears that he may not be able to stop and say no if they continue on their present path.

== Critical reception ==
Deborah Evans Price, of Billboard magazine reviewed the song favorably, saying that Paul's vocal "gives this group a distinctive sound, and this is yet another fine offering from this talented trio."

== Music video ==
The music video was directed by Jim Shea.

== Chart performance ==
"I'm Not Strong Enough to Say No" debuted at number 72 on the Billboard Hot Country Singles & Tracks chart for the week of July 29, 1995, and peaked at number 2 on the weeks of October 21 and October 28, 1995. It reached number 1 on the RPM Country Tracks chart in Canada on the week of November 6, 1995.

Chart (1995)	Peak position
Canada Country Singles (RPM)	1
US Bubbling Under Hot 100 (Billboard)	4
US Hot Country Songs (Billboard)	2

=== Year-end charts ===
Chart (1995)	Position
Canada Country Tracks (RPM)	30
US Country Songs (Billboard)	20
