= That's Just About Right =

Single by Blackhawk

from the album Blackhawk
- B-side: "Love Like This"
- Released: April 3, 1995
- Recorded: 1993
- Genre: Country
- Length: 4:04
- Label: Arista Nashville
- Songwriter: Jeff Black
- Producers: Mark Bright; Tim DuBois

Blackhawk singles chronology
"Down in Flames" (1994)	"That's Just About Right" (1995)	"I'm Not Strong Enough to Say No" (1995)

"That's Just About Right" is a song written by Jeff Black and recorded by American country music band Blackhawk. It was released in April 1995 as the fifth and final single from their self-titled debut album. It peaked at number 7 on the United States Billboard Hot Country Singles & Tracks chart, and number 9 on the Canadian RPM Country Tracks chart.

== Content ==
In the song, the narrator talks about his friend, an artist who goes "up in the mountains...to paint the world". The artist seeks an understanding of the human condition and realizes that it's unique to each individual - or "just about right".

== Critical reception ==
Deborah Evans Price, of Billboard magazine reviewed the song favorably, calling the bands "tight harmonies and this song's thought-provoking lyric and hook filled melody" a great combination. She goes on to say that it is a welcome sight to see an established country music group taking chances with this type of material.

== Music video ==
The music video was directed by Jim Shea, and features Reverend Howard Finster. It was filmed at Finster's Paradise Garden Park and Museum in Summerville, Georgia.

== Chart performance ==
"That's Just About Right" debuted at number 70 on the U.S. Billboard Hot Country Singles & Tracks for the week of April 15, 1995.

Chart (1995)	Peak position
Canada Country Singles (RPM)	9
US Hot Country Songs (Billboard)	7

=== Year-end charts ===
Chart (1995)	Position
US Country Songs (Billboard)	49
