= Blackhawk (album) =

BlackHawk

Studio album by Blackhawk
- Released: January 31, 1994
- Recorded: 1993
- Genre: Country
- Length: 36:31
- Label: Arista Nashville
- Producer: Mark Bright, Tim DuBois

Blackhawk chronology
| BlackHawk (1994) | Strong Enough (1995) |

Singles from Blackhawk
- 1. "Goodbye Says It All" Released: October 25, 1993; 2. "Every Once in a While" Released: April 4, 1994; 3. "I Sure Can Smell the Rain" Released: August 22, 1994; 4. "Down in Flames" Released: December 5, 1994; 5. "That's Just About Right" Released: April 3, 1995

Blackhawk is the debut studio album by the American country music group of the same name. Released in 1994 on Arista Nashville, it was certified 2× Platinum by the RIAA for shipping two million copies. The album produced the singles "Goodbye Says It All", "Every Once in a While", "I Sure Can Smell the Rain", "Down in Flames", and "That's Just About Right".

== Contents ==
Five singles were released from the album, four of which were top ten hits on the Billboard charts. The lead-off single "Goodbye Says It All" reached number 11.

"Goodbye Says It All", "Every Once in a While", "I Sure Can Smell the Rain" and "That's Just About Right" all had accompanying music videos. "Love Like This" was later recorded by Carlene Carter and released as the first single from her 1995 album Little Acts of Treason.

== Critical reception ==
An uncredited review in Billboard was favorable toward Paul's lead vocals and the band's Southern rock influences, but thought tracks such as "Goodbye Says It All" were "down the middle". New Country writer Michael Hight thought the band's harmonies were reminiscent of Bread and Crosby, Stills, Nash & Young, although he also criticized some of the songs' lyrics. Greg Burliuk of The Kingston Whig-Standard was more favorable, highlighting the band's vocal harmony and saying that they "attack each song vigorously".

== Track listing ==
| No. | Title | Writer(s) | Length |
|---|---|---|---|
| 1. | "Goodbye Says It All" | Charlie Black, Bobby Fischer, Johnny MacRae | 3:24 |
| 2. | "Down in Flames" | Michael Clark, Jeff Stevens | 3:44 |
| 3. | "Every Once in a While" | Henry Paul, Dave Robbins, Van Stephenson | 3:40 |
| 4. | "I Sure Can Smell the Rain" | Walt Aldridge, John Jarrard | 3:37 |
| 5. | "That's Just About Right" | Jeff Black | 4:04 |
| 6. | "One More Heartache" | Paul, Robbins, Stephenson | 3:28 |
| 7. | "Love Like This" | Pat Bunch, Mary Ann Kennedy, Pam Rose | 3:04 |
| 8. | "Between Ragged and Wrong" | Steve Bogard, Rick Giles, Steven J. Nathan | 3:37 |
| 9. | "Stone by Stone" | Paul, Robbins, Stephenson | 3:56 |
| 10. | "Let 'em Whirl" | Greg Jennings, Paul, Stephenson | 3:53 |

== Personnel ==
=== BlackHawk ===
- Henry Paul – lead vocals, mandolin, acoustic guitar
- Dave Robbins – keyboard, baritone vocals
- Van Stephenson – electric guitar, tenor vocals

=== Additional musicians ===
- Mike Chapman – bass guitar
- Dan Dugmore – acoustic guitar
- Randy Howard – fiddle
- Dann Huff – electric guitar
- Mary Ann Kennedy – mandolin
- Kenny Malone – percussion
- Kerry Marx – electric guitar
- Dale Oliver – electric guitar
- Danny Parks – electric guitar
- Kip Raines – drums
- Eric Silver – acoustic guitar, fiddle, mandolin
- Biff Watson – acoustic guitar
- John Willis – acoustic guitar, electric guitar
- Lonnie Wilson – drums

== Chart performance ==
=== Weekly charts ===
| Chart (1994) | Peak position |
|---|---|
| US Billboard 200 | 98 |
| US Top Country Albums (Billboard) | 15 |

=== Year-end charts ===
| Chart (1994) | Position |
|---|---|
| US Top Country Albums (Billboard) | 33 |
| Chart (1995) | Position |
| US Billboard 200 | 167 |
| US Top Country Albums (Billboard) | 24 |
| Chart (1996) | Position |
| US Top Country Albums (Billboard) | 74 |

=== Singles ===
| Year | Single | Chart Positions | | |
| Year | Single | US Country | US | CAN Country |
|---|---|---|---|---|
| 1993 | "Goodbye Says It All" | 11 | 111 | 29 |
| 1994 | "Every Once in a While" | 2 | — | 3 |
| 1994 | "I Sure Can Smell the Rain" | 9 | — | 9 |
| 1994 | "Down in Flames" | 10 | — | 10 |
| 1995 | "That's Just About Right" | 7 | — | 9 |

== Certifications ==
| Region | Certification | Certified units/sales |
|---|---|---|
| Canada (Music Canada) | Platinum | 100,000^{^} |
| United States (RIAA) | 2× Platinum | 2,000,000^{^} |
^{^} Shipments figures based on certification alone.
