= Love & Gravity =

Studio album by Blackhawk
- Released: July 29, 1997
- Genre: Country
- Length: 42:08
- Label: Arista Nashville
- Producer: Mike Clute, Mark Bright

Blackhawk chronology
| Strong Enough (1995) | Love & Gravity (1997) | The Sky's the Limit (1998) |

Singles from Love & Gravity
- 1. "Hole in My Heart" Released: June 28, 1997; 2. "Postmarked Birmingham" Released: October 18, 1997

Love & Gravity is the third studio album released by American country music group Blackhawk. It features the singles "Hole in My Heart" and "Postmarked Birmingham", which peaked at #31 and #37, respectively, on the Billboard Hot Country Singles & Tracks (now Hot Country Songs) charts in 1997.

All of the songs center around the theme of loneliness and all but one track concern relationships. The first nine songs are written from a first person perspective, but the last two, including the track "Lonely Boy" a cover of the 1977 pop standard by Andrew Gold, are written from the third person perspective. The track "Will You Be There (In the Morning)" is a cover of a song originally recorded by the band Heart.

All songs are sung with Henry Paul in the lead with the exception of the track "If That Was a Lie", which features Van Stephenson on lead vocals.

== Context ==
Love & Gravity was released following the 1995 hit album Strong Enough, which continued the success of the debut album BlackHawk. The band recorded the album after receiving TNN's "Star of Tomorrow" award at the network's Music City News Country Awards in 1995 and following a performance at Farm Aid in front of 50,000 fans later that year.

Work on the album began in 1996 as the band toured with Wynonna and made their debut at the Grand Ole Opry early in the year. While recording, the group was nominated as best band by the Academy of Country Music and the Country Music Association. Near the end of the year, BlackHawk learned that their debut album had reached double platinum status.

Love & Gravity would go on to be released on July 29, 1997, under the Arista Nashville label. Upon release, lead singer Henry Paul described the album as a "risky" move for the band, alluding to its contemporary country sound and increased band participation in the songwriting. Paul remarked that the risk of the album was made to "make the kind of progress in our careers that we hope to make." He stated that songs with more "sociological value" were seeping into the band's repertoire to mix with radio hits.

The band would go on to promote the album following its release. A performance in front of a crowd of 5,000 at the Mall of America in Bloomington, Minnesota, in August 1997, was documented by the media. During the event, 1,000 signed copies of the album were distributed, free of charge. On October 18, the band made an appearance at Legion Field prior to a University of Alabama college football contest against the University of Tennessee, performing the Star Spangled Banner.

== Content ==
The album produced two singles, "Hole in My Heart" and "Postmarked Birmingham". Both reached the top 40 on the Billboard charts, but neither peaked as high as the band's singles from its previous two albums.

Seven of the eleven tracks were written in part by a member of BlackHawk. The exceptions included: "Will You Be There (In the Morning)", a cover of the 1993 hit song by the rock band Heart; "Postmarked Birmingham", which featured the introduction of renowned songwriter Phil Vassar; "Hold Me Harmless" composed by songwriter Roger Wojahn; and the cover of Andrew Gold's 1977 pop hit "Lonely Boy."

=== Singles ===
==== Hole in My Heart ====
Written by band members Van Stephenson and Dave Robbins alongside Desmond Child, "Hole in My Heart" was released as the lead-off single for the album and peaked at number 31 on U.S. country charts, it reached number 52 on Canadian charts and peaked at number 123 on the Billboard Hot 100, marking the band's fifth highest position on the chart. A music video was released to television for the single.

==== Postmarked Birmingham ====
"Postmarked Birmingham" is a ballad written by Phil Vassar and Don Sampson. The song marked the beginning of a songwriter career for Vassar who went on to pen country hits including Little Red Rodeo and My Next Thirty Years; he would also go on to begin a successful recording career in the 2000s.

The track was the second single released from the album, peaking at #37 on United States country charts and #53 on the Canadian charts. A music video for the song was also created and released to television. It was produced by Robert Deaton and George J. Flanigen and was nominated as the Nashville Music Video of the Year.

Later discussing the song, Henry Paul would recount: "People don't always find the answers they're looking for. We wanted a song to have a simplicity as it tells a memorable story to get the point across while begin as succinct and concise as possible."

== Critical reception ==
Following the release of the album, BlackHawk was honored as the "CMT Showcase Artist" for August 1997.

Reviews of the album were mixed. AllMusic gave the band a generally favorable review, remarking that the album's "best moments demonstrate that BlackHawk is more talented and diverse than their previous two albums would suggest", however the review also labeled, without specifying, that certain songs were "simply unmemorable." Overall, the website gave the album three stars out of a possible five.

The review of The Plain Dealer was mostly critical. Three tracks were singled out; the title track was criticized for being "lighthearted" and leaving the listener "feeling totally empty", "Postmarked Birmingham" was cited for starting "strong but" losing "its momentum" and was criticized as a "take no chances effort", "If That Was a Lie" was described as the "most interesting" track on the album for its change in lead vocals to Van Stephenson from Henry Paul, whose vocals were criticized for being "raspy." Overall, the album was given a "C."

The Atlanta Journal-Constitution gave the album an "A" stating that the band's "choice to record music and meaningful lyrics combined with vocal and musical talent [made] the album a winner." Two of the tracks were expressively lauded: "Postmarked Birmingham" and "She Dances with Her Shadow."

According to reflections on the album, the singles released were ignored by "the powers that decide what the public should hear...as did radio stations." But the Virginian Pilot declared that "fans and critics loved the album" and that it "was an excellent album with...outstanding songs and exciting lead vocals by Henry Paul."

== Track listing ==
| No. | Title | Writer(s) | Length |
|---|---|---|---|
| 1. | "Love and Gravity (Was Fallin' from Her Good Graces)" | Henry Paul, Dave Robbins, Mark D. Sanders | 3:16 |
| 2. | "Stepping Stones" | Robbins, Jeff Silbar, Van Stephenson | 4:05 |
| 3. | "Postmarked Birmingham" | Don Sampson, Phil Vassar | 4:20 |
| 4. | "Will You Be There (In the Morning)" | Robert John "Mutt" Lange | 3:48 |
| 5. | "It Ain't About Love Anymore" | Desmond Child, Robbins, Stephenson | 4:00 |
| 6. | "Nobody's Fool" | Dale Oliver, Paul, Jim Peterik | 3:52 |
| 7. | "If That Was a Lie" | Robbins, Silbar, Stephenson | 3:59 |
| 8. | "Hole in My Heart" | Child, Robbins, Stephenson | 3:59 |
| 9. | "Hold Me Harmless" | Roger Wojahn | 3:33 |
| 10. | "She Dances with Her Shadow" | Oliver, Paul, Robbins, Stephenson | 3:23 |
| 11. | "Lonely Boy" | Andrew Gold | 3:57 |

== Personnel ==
=== BlackHawk ===
- Henry Paul – lead vocals, mandolin
- Dave Robbins – keyboard, piano, baritone vocals
- Van Stephenson – acoustic guitar, tenor vocals

=== Additional musicians ===
- Dennis Belfield – bass guitar
- Bobby Huff – drums, percussion
- Dann Huff – electric guitar
- Greg Jennings – acoustic guitar
- Terry McMillan – percussion
- Dale Oliver – electric guitar
- Eric Silver – acoustic guitar, banjo, mandolin
- Joe Spivey – fiddle

Strings performed by the Nashville String Machine and conducted by Carl Marsh.

== Chart performance ==
=== Weekly charts ===
| Chart (1997) | Peak position |
|---|---|
| US Billboard 200 | 79 |
| US Top Country Albums (Billboard) | 8 |

=== Year-end charts ===
| Chart (1997) | Position |
|---|---|
| US Top Country Albums (Billboard) | 74 |

=== Singles ===
| Year | Single | Chart Positions | | |
| Year | Single | US Country | US | CAN Country |
|---|---|---|---|---|
| 1997 | "Hole in My Heart" | 31 | 123 | 52 |
| 1997 | "Postmarked Birmingham" | 37 | — | 53 |
