= Blackhawk (band) =

American country music band

BlackHawk
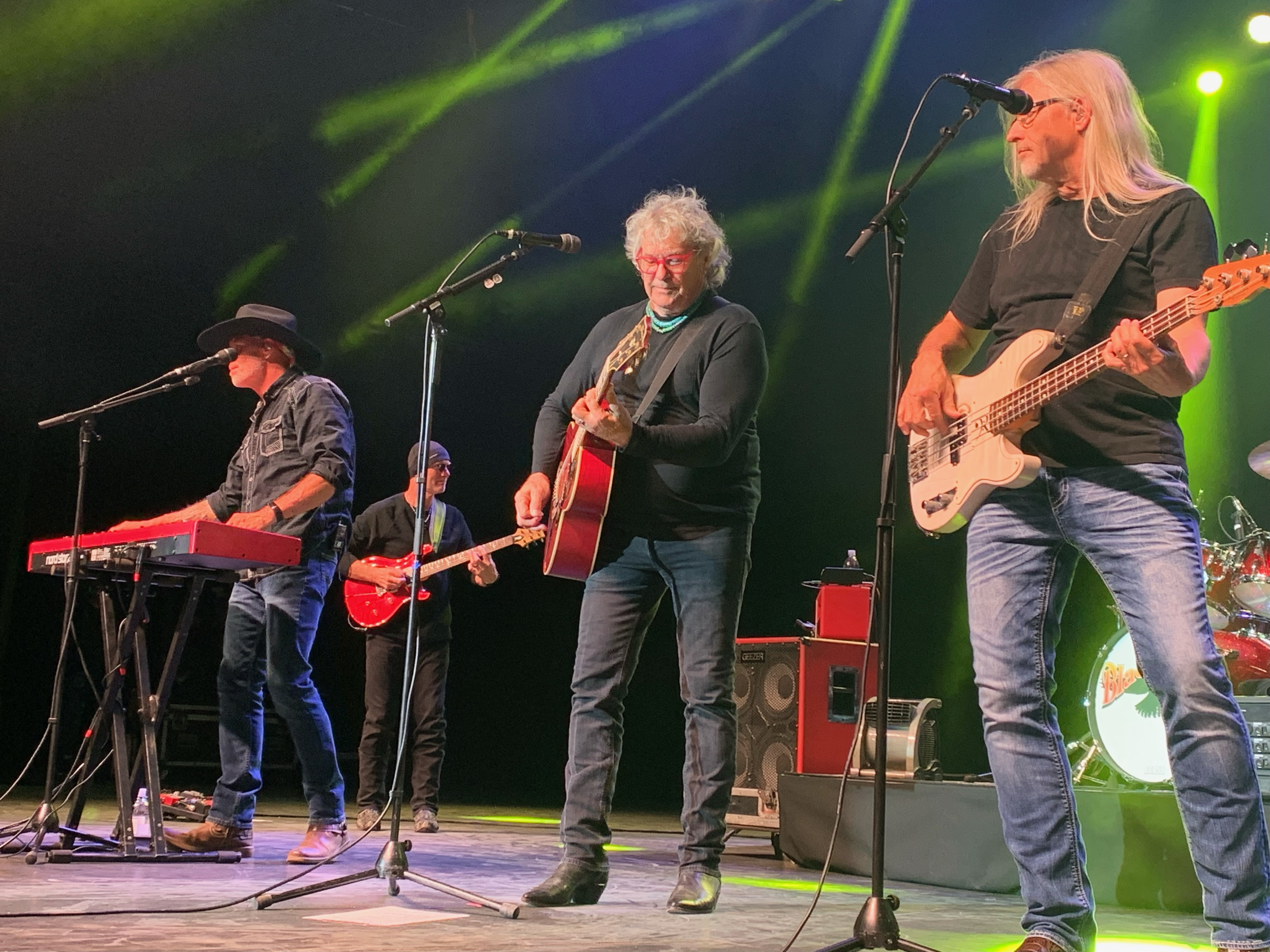
- BlackHawk in May 2024 (L-R: Dave Robbins, Henry Paul, and touring bassist Randy Threet)

Background information
- Origin: Nashville, Tennessee, U.S.
- Genre: Country/Country-Rock
- Works: BlackHawk discography
- Years active: 1992–present
- Labels: Arista Nashville, Columbia, Rust Nashville, Loud & Proud, Mirror Lake
- Spinoff of: Outlaws
- Members: Henry Paul; Dave Robbins; Randy Threet (Note: While Randy Threet remains in Blackhawk's backing band, he is not credited as an official member of Blackhawk proper.)
- Past members: Van Stephenson; Anthony Crawford; Jon Coleman; Michael Randall
- Website: blackhawklive.com

Blackhawk (sometimes stylized as BlackHawk) is an American country music band from Nashville, Tennessee. The band consists of founding members Henry Paul (lead vocals, guitar, mandolin) and Dave Robbins (keyboards, vocals), along with a backing band consisting of Randy Threet (bass guitar, vocals), Jeff Aulich (guitar), Jimmy Dormire (guitar), and Mike Bailey (drums). Paul, a then-former member of Southern rock band Outlaws, founded Blackhawk in 1992 with Robbins and Van Stephenson (vocals, guitar). Stephenson had been a solo rock singer, while both he and Robbins had success as songwriters for acts such as Restless Heart. Stephenson left shortly before his death from melanoma in 2001 and was replaced by Threet, then Anthony Crawford and Michael Randall; Threet has remained in the touring band. Robbins was replaced with Jon Coleman in 2008 before rejoining in 2010. When Paul re-established Outlaws in 2005, he began performing simultaneously in both Blackhawk and Outlaws, and the two bands' memberships converged.

Blackhawk signed to Arista Nashville in 1993 and released their self-titled debut album in 1994. The project certified double-platinum by the Recording Industry Association of America (RIAA). They also released Strong Enough (1995), Love & Gravity (1997), The Sky's the Limit (1998), and Greatest Hits before leaving Arista in 2001. Their last major-label album was 2002's Spirit Dancer on Columbia Records; subsequent releases have been independent. Their albums accounted for several singles on the Billboard Hot Country Singles & Tracks (now called Hot Country Songs) charts, including top-ten hits "Every Once in a While", "I Sure Can Smell the Rain", "Down in Flames", "That's Just About Right", "I'm Not Strong Enough to Say No", "Like There Ain't No Yesterday", and "There You Have It" between 1994 and 1999. Blackhawk's music combines influences of Southern rock with country. Characteristics of their sound include Paul's distinctive singing voice, prominent vocal harmony, and use of mandolin.

== History ==
=== Early history and formation ===
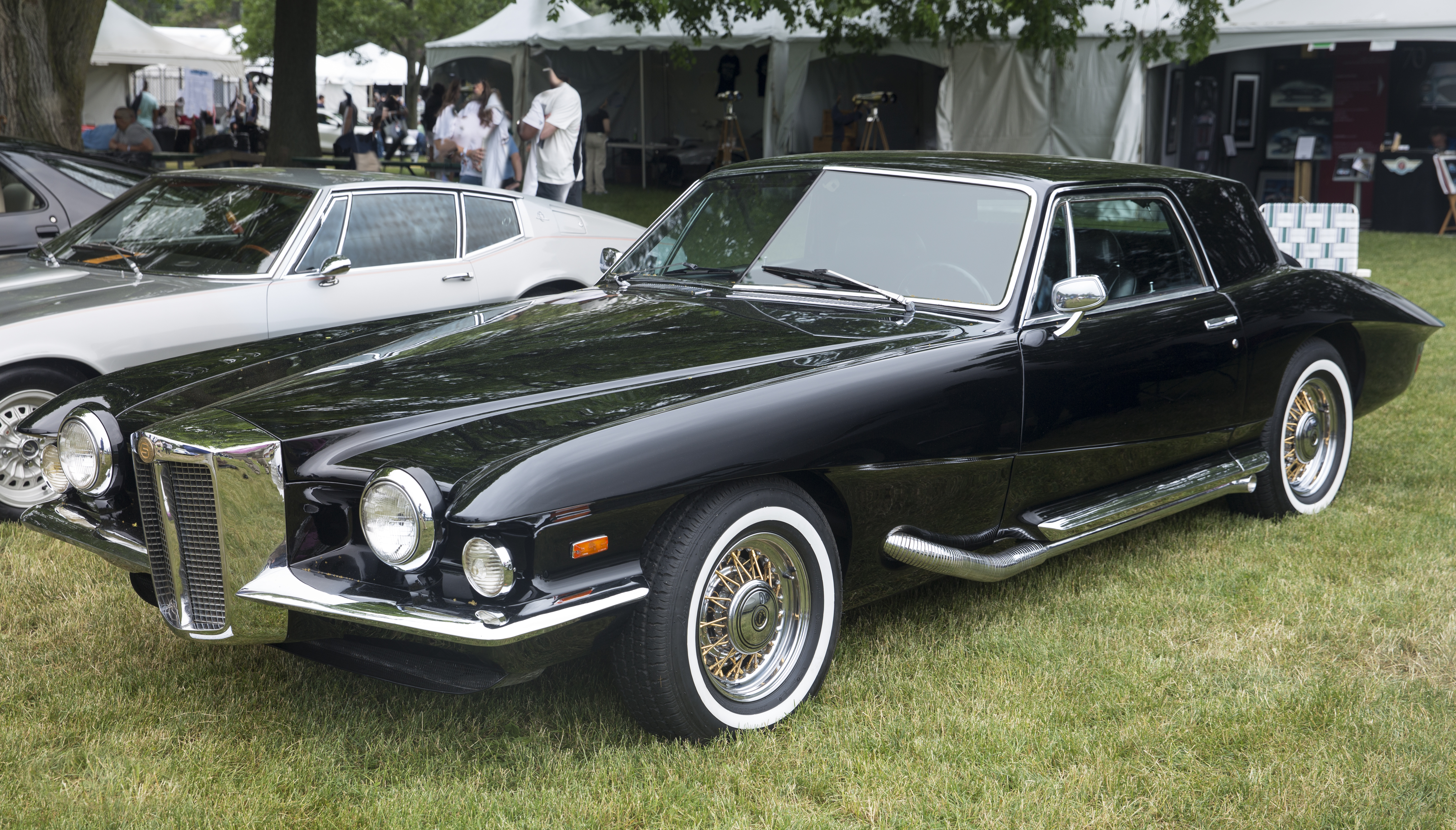
The Stutz Blackhawk, a car model from which the band derived its name

Prior to the foundation of Blackhawk, lead vocalist Henry Paul was a member of the rock band Outlaws and recorded several albums as the Henry Paul Band. He left Outlaws and moved to Nashville in 1987 to pursue country music songwriting. Through his connections as a songwriter, he met Van Stephenson and Dave Robbins. Stephenson had been a rock singer, and had a pop hit in 1984 with "Modern Day Delilah". Both he and Robbins found success in the mid-late 1980s as country music songwriters, writing several songs for Restless Heart such as "The Bluest Eyes in Texas". Paul had wanted to record as a solo artist after leaving Outlaws, but Tim DuBois, who co-wrote "The Bluest Eyes in Texas" and was serving as Restless Heart's producer, suggested Paul form a band with Stephenson and Robbins, as they had wanted to do so after being inspired by the success of Restless Heart. In 1992, the musicians began writing songs and recording demos. They thought the process was unsuccessful, but discovered a shared interest in vocal harmony and using acoustic instruments, which would help form their sound. Paul became lead vocalist, guitarist, and mandolinist, with Robbins on baritone harmony and keyboards, and Stephenson on tenor harmony and guitar. The musicians chose the name "Blackhawk" from the Stutz Blackhawk, a model of car. DuBois was at the time president of Arista Nashville (the country music division of Arista Records, with whom Paul was signed as a member of Outlaws), and signed Blackhawk to a record deal in 1993.

=== 1994–1995: Blackhawk ===
The original lineup of Blackhawk, circa 1994 (L-R: Henry Paul, Dave Robbins, and Van Stephenson)

Arista Nashville released Blackhawk's self-titled debut album in February 1994. DuBois and Mark Bright served as its producers. The album was preceded by its lead single "Goodbye Says It All", which peaked at number eleven on the Billboard Hot Country Singles & Tracks (now called Hot Country Songs) charts. Next was "Every Once in a While", a song co-written by all three members of the band. In early 1994, it peaked at number two on Hot Country Songs, and number one on the country music charts of Radio & Records. The album accounted for three more singles between 1994 and 1995: "I Sure Can Smell the Rain", "Down in Flames", and a cover of Jeff Black's "That's Just About Right". All three reached top ten on the Billboard country charts. Another cut included on the album was a cover of Kennedy Rose's "Love Like This". By 1996, Blackhawk was certified double-platinum by the Recording Industry Association of America (RIAA), honoring shipments of two million copes in the United States. The Academy of Country Music (ACM) nominated Blackhawk for Top New Vocal Group or Duet, and received nominations for Vocal Group of the Year in 1995 and 1996 from the ACM and the Country Music Association (CMA). Blackhawk promoted the album through their first tour, where they served as an opening act for Tim McGraw. For concert purposes, they established a touring band initially consisting of Dale Oliver (lead guitar), Tere Bertke (bass guitar), and Bobby Huff (drums).

=== 1995–1998: Strong Enough and Love & Gravity ===
Blackhawk's second studio album was 1995's Strong Enough. When selecting songs, Bright chose 30 songs out of over 900 which had been submitted to him, and presented them to Blackhawk while they were touring. Among the contributing writers were Mutt Lange, Henry Gross, and Dennis Linde. It debuted at number four on the Billboard Top Country Albums chart upon release, making it the highest-debuting album by a group or band on the country music charts since Alabama's The Closer You Get... in 1983. Arista Nashville promoted the album through commercials on CMT. The album's lead single, Lange's "I'm Not Strong Enough to Say No", peaked at number two on Hot Country Songs upon release, and "Like There Ain't No Yesterday" went to number three on the same chart. Both songs peaked at number one on the Canadian country music charts. "Almost a Memory Now" and "Big Guitar" were top 20 hits on Hot Country Songs. The album's final single, "King of the World" (also a Jeff Black cover), failed to reach top 40. Strong Enough was certified gold by the RIAA, honoring U.S. shipments of 500,000 copies.

In 1997, Arista released Blackhawk's third album, Love & Gravity. The band focused on songs they had written, and several tracks were written while touring. "If That Was a Lie" was the first song in their career to feature Stephenson singing lead vocals instead of Paul. Songs that they wrote which did not make it onto the album were given to other artists, including one song recorded by the Buffalo Club. The album included covers of Heart's "Will You Be There (In the Morning)" (also written by Lange) and Andrew Gold's "Lonely Boy". Nashville-based producer Mike Clute assisted Bright in production, doing so on digital audio workstations made by Fairlight, making Love & Gravity one of the first country albums to be recorded entirely on digital equipment. The album accounted for only two unsuccessful singles, "Hole in My Heart" (written by Robbins, Stephenson, and Desmond Child) and "Postmarked Birmingham" (co-written by Phil Vassar), which both peaked in the 30s on Hot Country Songs. Brian Wahlert of Country Standard Time thought the Heart and Andrew Gold covers, as well as the string section on "Postmarked Birmingham", suggested a more pop influence than the band's first two albums. Billboard writer Deborah Evans Price later attributed the failure of Love & Gravity to the band "stretching out" with songs that proved unpopular with radio. Also in 1997, Blackhawk covered the Rolling Stones' "Wild Horses" on the tribute album Stone Country: Country Artists Perform the Songs of the Rolling Stones.

=== 1998–2001: The Sky's the Limit, Greatest Hits, and Spirit Dancer ===
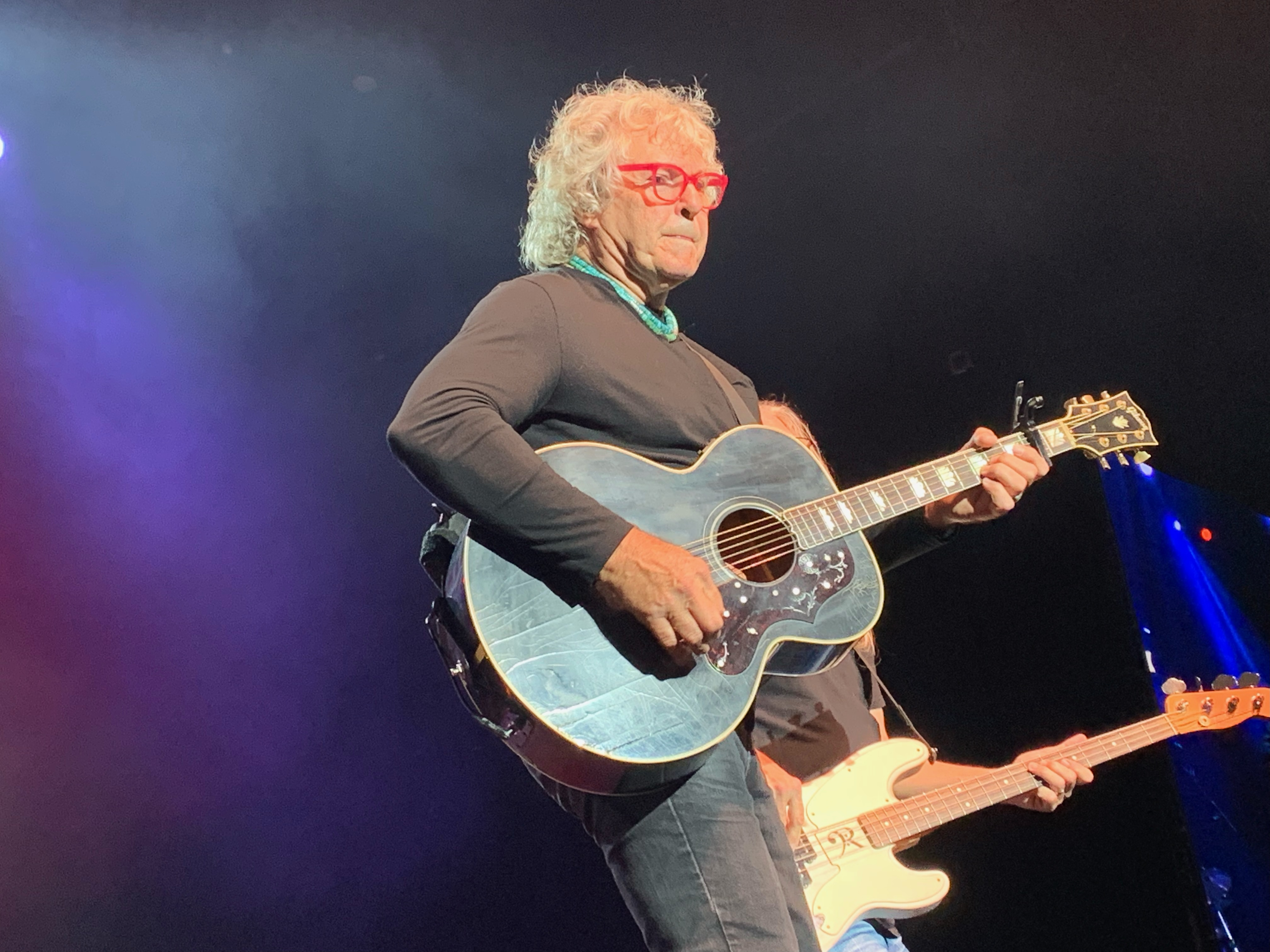
Lead singer Henry Paul in 2024

In 1998, Blackhawk covered the Christmas hymn "We Three Kings" on Arista Nashville's compilation Star of Wonder: A Country Christmas Collection, which featured all artists on the label at the time performing Christmas songs. Blackhawk's rendition charted in 1998 from seasonal airplay. That same year, they released their fourth Arista album, The Sky's the Limit. Paul said he wanted the band to undo the experimental tracks of Love & Gravity and record an album more consistent in tone to their first two, an opinion also shared by executives at Arista Nashville. The album included "Always Have, Always Will", their first track with Robbins on lead vocals. Arista Nashville promoted the album by holding radio contests for listeners to win advance copies of the album in markets where they had determined Blackhawk's music was still popular with listeners. Lead single "There You Have It" charted in the top five of Hot Country Songs in early 1999, accounting for the band's only Billboard Hot 100 entry, peaking at number 41. The other single from the album was "Your Own Little Corner of My Heart".

In 2000, the band released Greatest Hits. It included most of their singles to this point, "Always Have, Always Will", and three new tracks including the album's only single, "I Need You All the Time". During the project's release, Stephenson quit the group due to complications of melanoma and died in April 2001. Randy Threet (who had taken over as bassist in their road band) replaced Stephenson on tenor harmony; their touring band at this point were guitarist Chris Anderson and drummer Mike Radowski.

Blackhawk exited Arista Nashville after The Sky's the Limit and signed with Columbia Records Nashville in 2001. Their only Columbia album, Spirit Dancer, accounted for the low-charting singles "Days of America" and "One Night in New Orleans". William Ruhlmann thought the album was more "personal" than previous efforts, and also thought the lyrics were inspired by Stephenson's death. His review also highlighted "Days of America" and "Brothers of the Southland" for their lyrics. Another track from Spirit Dancer, "Gloryland", was later covered by Keni Thomas in 2005 with backing vocals from Blackhawk. In 2003, guitarist Anthony Crawford took over as Blackhawk's tenor vocalist.

=== 2005–present: Independent releases ===
In 2005, Paul re-established Outlaws after reuniting with guitarist Hughie Thomasson. The lineup included Robbins and Anderson, alongside drummer Monte Yoho; guitarist Billy Crain replaced Thomasson after the latter died in 2007. Yoho and Crain joined Blackhawk on tour, and Paul toured with Outlaws while maintaining his membership in Blackhawk. Paul and Robbins founded the Van Stephenson Fund in 2006 to raise money for cancer research.

Also in 2006, Blackhawk signed with Rust Nashville. Their first release for the label was "Better at Hello", intended to lead off their first Rust album. The band joined Restless Heart and Little Texas on the "Triple Threat" tour, which ran through 2007. Crawford exited Blackhawk in 2006 due to creative differences and was replaced by Michael Randall. Rust Nashville closed in early 2007. Threet, who had stayed in the touring band, reverted to tenor vocalist after Randall left. Robbins quit Blackhawk in 2008, citing a desire to focus on songwriting. He was replaced by Jon Coleman, who also performed with Outlaws. At this point, Paul, Threet, and Coleman were backed by guitarists Chris Anderson and Billy Crain and drummer Monte Yoho. With this lineup, the band released a live album, Greatest Hits Live, on Airline Records in 2008. By 2009, they were doing about 80 shows a year.

Coleman left the band and Robbins rejoined in 2010. Blackhawk credited Paul and Robbins as members of the group proper, although Threet remained in the backing band. In 2011, they independently released the album Down from the Mountain. Paul and Robbins continued to tour as members of both Blackhawk and Outlaws. In 2014, Paul and Robbins released the album Brothers of the Southland. The title track was co-written by Jim Peterik, and was previously recorded by the band on Spirit Dancer in 2002. Also included were re-recordings of demos the band had done before signing with Arista Nashville. Yoho and Anderson contributed to the album, as did Ed King of Lynyrd Skynyrd and Paul Riddle of the Marshall Tucker Band. Brian Mansfield of USA Today described the album as a "tribute" to Southern rock artists who had died, and thought the album would appeal to fans of Blackhawk's earlier work.

Blackhawk's next major release was the live album Just About Right: Live from Atlanta, recorded at Eddie's Attic in Decatur, Georgia, in 2017 and released three years later. Next in 2022 was the studio album Blue Highway, consisting of songs they had written with Stephenson in the 1990s. All twelve songs were original demo recordings with new instrumentation added. As of 2025, Blackhawk remains active as a touring act. Their touring band consists of guitarists Jeff Aulich and Jimmy Dormire (previously of Confederate Railroad), bassist and tenor vocalist Randy Threet, and drummer Mike Bailey. All members of Blackhawk and their touring band also tour as Outlaws.

== Musical style ==
Blackhawk's sound features elements of Southern rock in its use of electric guitar, as well as three-part vocal harmony and prominent mandolin in many of their songs. Both the editors of Country Music: The Encyclopedia and Stephen Thomas Erlewine of AllMusic also found Southern rock influence in Blackhawk's sound, while also finding the vocal harmony of the original lineup similar to Restless Heart. They furthered the comparison to Restless Heart because of DuBois's involvement in founding both bands. Wahlert described the band's sound as combining electric guitar, mandolin, and vocal harmonies. The common use of these elements led New Country magazine writer Michael Hight to compare Blackhawk to Diamond Rio, who were also on Arista Nashville in the 1990s. Shirley Jenkins, in a Fort Worth Star-Telegram article reprinted in the Anchorage Daily News, also compared the band's sound to Restless Heart and Outlaws, stating that they had "close harmonies with traditional acoustic instruments and an electric guitar edge." In a Los Angeles Times review, Buddy Seigal said that Blackhawk's debut album has "tight three-part harmonies [and] jangling guitars and mandolins". In relation to the band's frequent vocal harmonies, many critics have highlighted the nature of Paul's lead vocals. Wahlert called his voice "distinctive [and] rough", while Ron Young of MusicRow considered his voice "pinched" and reminiscent of Huey Lewis. Nick Krewen of the Waterloo Region Record said that Paul's "nasal intonation gives Blackhawk their distinct sound."

Erlewine and the Country Music: The Encyclopedia editors both highlighted the songwriting experiences of Stephenson and Robbins as a factor in the band's sound. Of their lyrical content, Hight called "I Sure Can Smell the Rain" an "enjoyable character sketch". Dennis Miller of the Star-Gazette said that the songs on their debut were "literate", highlighting "I Sure Can Smell the Rain" and "That's Just About Right". He called the latter "inspirational" and said the album track "Between Ragged and Wrong" has a theme of individualism. Similarly, an uncredited review of "That's Just About Right" in Billboard described the song as having a "thought-provoking lyric and hook-filled melody". Despite the songwriting experience of all three founding members, Stephenson mentioned that they include material written by others as well to "let other people do what they do best."

Paul has cited Poco, the Flying Burrito Brothers, Flatt & Scruggs, and Johnny Cash as being influences. Stephenson said that he was influenced by rock music of the 1960s and 1970s, and his decision to be in a three-piece group was due to him having previously performed in similar groups while in college.

== Members ==
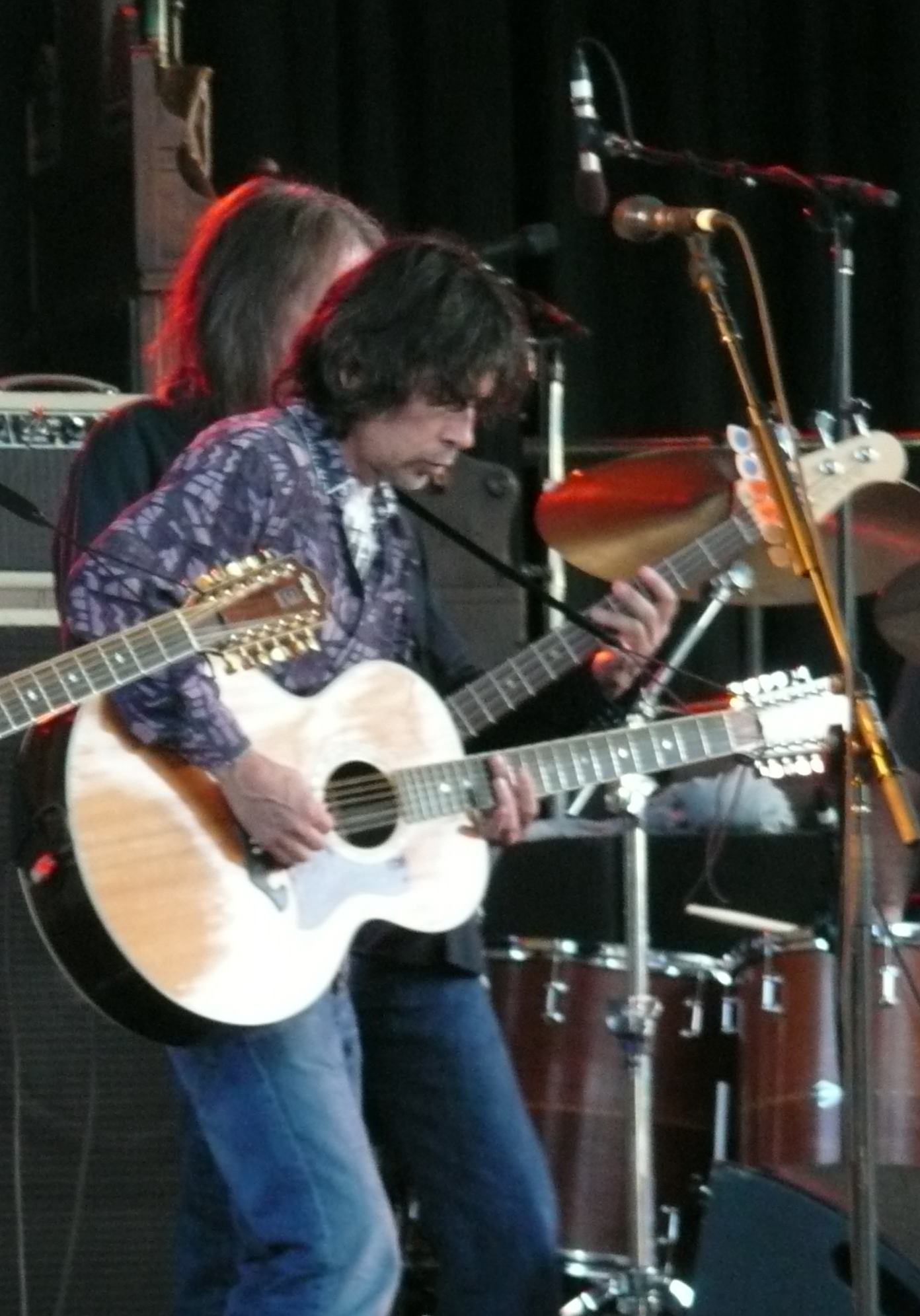
Anthony Crawford is a former member of Blackhawk.

Current

- Henry Paul - lead vocals, guitar, mandolin (1992–present)
- Dave Robbins - keyboards, baritone vocals (1992–2008, 2010–present)

Former

- Jon Coleman - keyboards, vocals (2008–10)
- Anthony Crawford - tenor vocals, guitar (2003–06)
- Michael Randall - tenor vocals, guitar (2006–07)
- Van Stephenson - tenor vocals, guitar (1992–2000)

Touring

- Jeff Aulich - guitar
- Mike Bailey - drums
- Jimmy Dormire - guitar
- Randy Threet - bass guitar, tenor vocals

Former touring

- Chris Anderson - guitar
- Tere Bertke - bass guitar
- Kirk Eberhard - bass guitar
- Billy Crain - guitar
- Bobby Huff - drums
- Dale Oliver - guitar
- Mike Radowski - drums
- Monte Yoho - drums

== Discography ==
- Blackhawk (1994)
- Strong Enough (1995)
- Love & Gravity (1997)
- The Sky's the Limit (1998)
- Spirit Dancer (2002)
- Down from the Mountain (2011)
- Brothers of the Southland (2014)
- Blue Highway (2022)

== Awards and nominations ==
Year	Association	Category	Result
1993	Academy of Country Music	Top New Vocal Group or Duet	Nominated
1995	Academy of Country Music	Top Vocal Group of the Year	Nominated
1995	Country Music Association	Vocal Group of the Year	Nominated
1996	Academy of Country Music	Top Vocal Group of the Year	Nominated
1996	Country Music Association	Vocal Group of the Year	Nominated
