= Keni Thomas =

American country singer (born 1965)

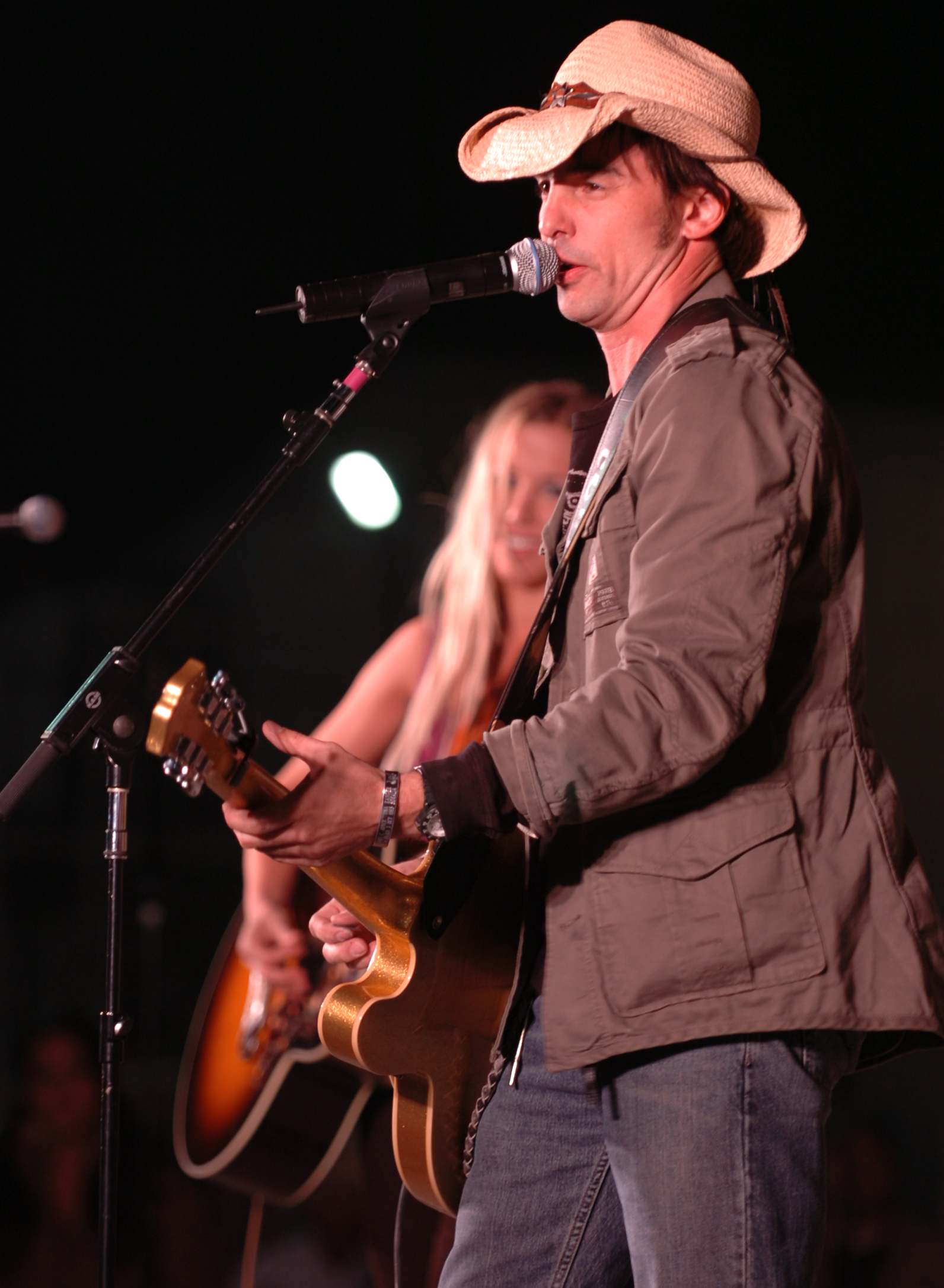
- Thomas performing at Camp Arifjan, Kuwait in 2006

Background information
- Born: July 1, 1965 (age 61); Georgia, U.S.
- Genre: Country
- Occupation: Singer-songwriter
- Instrument: Vocals
- Years active: 1996–present
- Label: Moraine

Keni Thomas
- Military career
- Allegiance: United States
- Branch: United States Army
- Service years: 1991–1997
- Rank: Staff Sergeant
- Units: 3rd Ranger Battalion; 75th Ranger Regiment
- Conflicts: Battle of Mogadishu (1993)

Kenneth Mervyn Thomas (born July 1, 1965) is an American country music singer and former United States Army Ranger. Thomas was deployed in support of Operation Restore Hope as a member of Task Force Ranger in Somalia, and served in the Battle of Mogadishu. Thomas works as a motivational speaker drawing from this experience as an Army Ranger.

As a country singer, Thomas has recorded several independently released albums. Two singles, from the album Flags of Our Fathers: A Soldier's Story charted on the Billboard country music charts.

Thomas appeared in a pair of 2011 episodes of FX television show Louie, portraying himself in a fictionalized version of a real U.S.O. visit to Afghanistan (season 2 episodes 11[part 1] and 11[part2]).

== Military career ==
Thomas enlisted in the Army in 1991. Prior to joining the Army he graduated from the University of Florida. He served in the 3rd Ranger Battalion, eventually attaining the rank of Staff Sergeant.

Thomas was a member of Task Force Ranger as a part of Operation Restore Hope in Somalia. A main objective of the Task Force was to capture the elusive Somali warlord Mohamed Farrah Aidid. The most well known of their combat missions occurred October 3, 1993, when Thomas and fellow Task Force members were involved in the Battle of Mogadishu that was later immortalized in the book Black Hawk Down and its subsequent film adaptation, for which he served as a consultant. Twenty years later he returned to Mogadishu with fellow veteran Jeff Struecker, now a pastor, to film a short retracing their steps in the Battle of Mogadishu. He also served as a consultant for We Were Soldiers.

After Somalia, Thomas went on to serve as an assistant team leader on Ranger recon teams. His military decorations and achievements include the Bronze Star for Valor with the "V" device and the Combat Infantryman Badge. Thomas was awarded Master Parachute wings with over 400 jumps, the British and Belgian parachute wings, and successfully completed the Army's Ranger School, Belgian Commando School, the Special Forces Combat Diver's School, the Army's Jumpmaster Course, Pathfinder School, Military Free Fall (MFF) School, Cold Weather Mountaineering School, and Medical Emergency School.

== Musical career ==
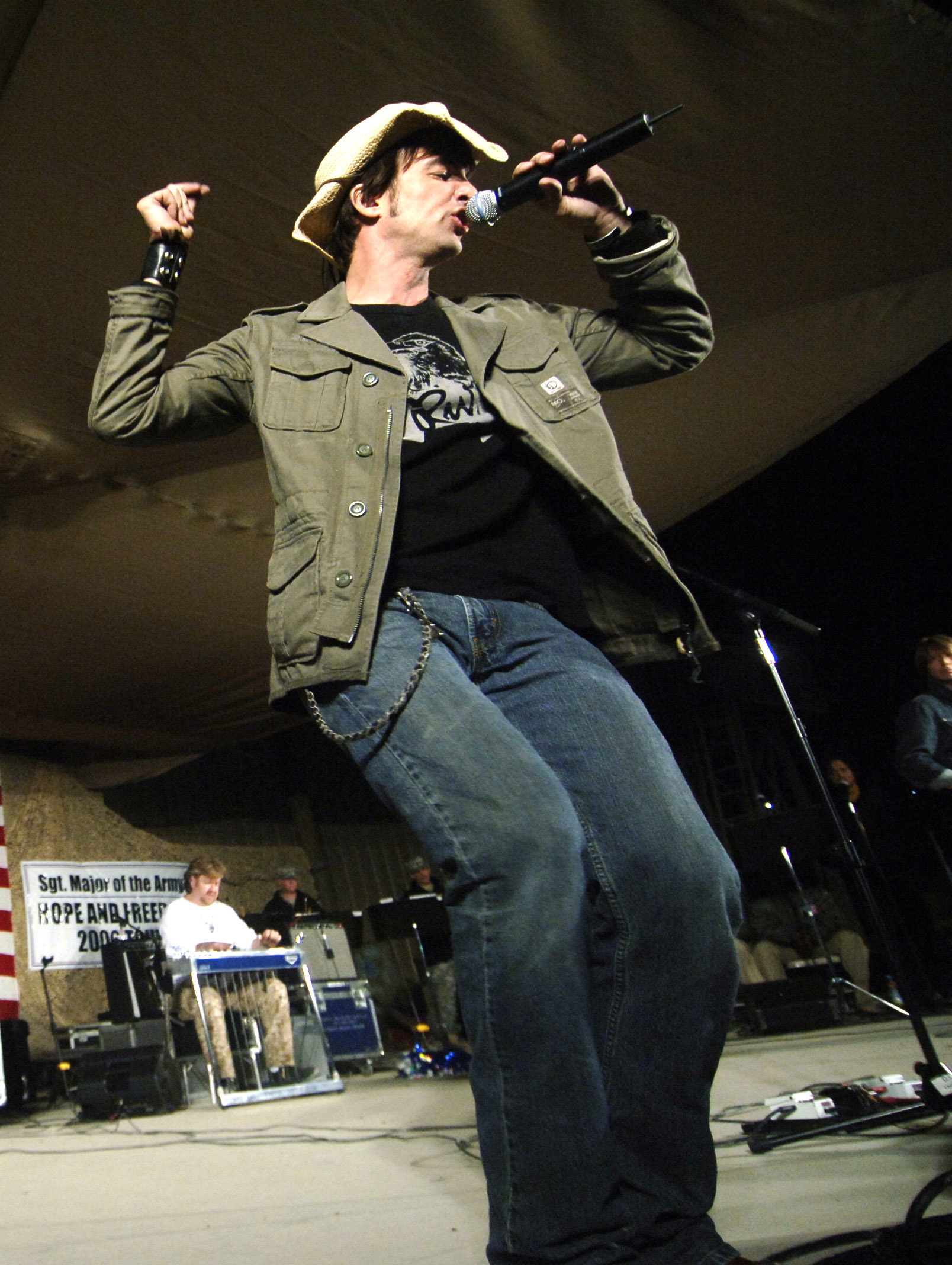
Thomas performing in 2006

Thomas formed the band Cornbread and began his career in music by performing with the band in and around Columbus, Georgia. Cornbread made a bigger name for itself during the middle to the late 1990s and extended its shows to college campuses such as Auburn University. Thomas and Cornbread released several albums, including Flags of Our Fathers, which was released under the artist's name, Keni Thomas. Cornbread was also featured in the movie Sweet Home Alabama, starring Reese Witherspoon. In the movie, Keni and his bandmates perform the feature song, "Sweet Home Alabama" (originally recorded by Lynyrd Skynyrd in the late 1970s), for which the movie was named.

Thomas donates some of the proceeds to the Hero Fund, which directs those funds to the Special Operations Warrior Foundation, an organization created to provide college scholarships and financial aid to the children of deceased or wounded Special Operations.

Thomas has made several appearances on the famed Grand Ole Opry, including his most recent performance in May 2014. He has appeared on several television shows to talk about his book and his time during the Battle of Mogadishu, including Huckabee and CNN.

Thomas has performed the national anthem for the New York Yankees several times, including game one of the 2009 World Series and again in 2012, as well as for the San Francisco Giants on Memorial Day 2010.

Thomas appeared in a 2011 episode of the FX television show Louie, portraying himself in a fictionalized version of a real U.S.O. visit to Afghanistan he took with comedian Louis C.K. in December 2008.

Thomas' song "Hold The Line" was featured in the May 2014 feature documentary, The Hornet's Nest, which uses real footage to tell the story of an elite group of U.S. troops sent on a dangerous mission deep inside one of Afghanistan's most hostile valleys.

On Sunday, June 8, 2014, Thomas sang the National Anthem for the unveiling of Allied Paratrooper Monument in honor of the 70th Anniversary of the D-Day in Normandy, France. He performed with the 82nd Airborne Division Color Guard.

== Other ventures ==
Upon leaving active duty service, Thomas worked as a youth counselor. He also became a speaker, giving presentations to various audiences across the United States. Represented by Premiere Speakers Bureau, Thomas draws from his experiences on the battlefield, and inspires people to achieve greatness by stressing the importance of outstanding leadership at every level, even if the only person you are leading is yourself.

In 2011, Thomas wrote and released his first book, entitled "Get It On." The book tells his personal account from October 1993 when he was writing a letter to his mom, then heard the words "get it on," said by one of his Army Ranger superiors. Thomas geared up, loaded into a Blackhawk helicopter, and headed for Mogadishu, Somalia, where he would become one of the lucky servicemen to return from what would become known as Black Hawk Down, a battle that lasted two days, took 18 lives and wounded an additional 73 soldiers.

== Discography ==
=== Albums ===
==== As Cornbread ====
Title	Album details
Following Ceres	Release date: 1996; Label: Raspberry Moon
Headspace and Timing	Release date: 1998; Label: Raspberry Moon
No Place Like Home	Release date: 2000; Label: RBM Musikproduktion

==== As Keni Thomas ====
Title	Album details
Hero Fund	Release date: May 22, 2003; Label: Moraine Records
Flags of Our Fathers: A Soldier's Story	Release date: January 25, 2005; Label: Moraine Records
Gunslinger	Release date: November 29, 2007; Label: Tenacity Records
Give It Away	Release date: June 24, 2014; Label: RBM Records

=== Singles ===
Year	Single	Peak positions	Album
Year	Single	US Country	Album
2005	"Not Me" (with Vince Gill and Emmylou Harris)	47	Flags of Our Fathers: A Soldier's Story
2005	"Gloryland" (with Blackhawk)	56	Flags of Our Fathers: A Soldier's Story
2008	"Shreveport to L.A."	—	Gunslinger
2009	"Gunslinger"	—	Gunslinger
2014	"Hold The Line"	—	Give It Away
"—" denotes releases that did not chart

=== Music videos ===
Year	Video	Director
2005	"Not Me"	
2008	"Shreveport to L.A."	Glenn Sweitzer
2009	"Gunslinger"	Glenn Sweitzer
2014	"Hold The Line"	Glenn Sweitzer
