= Goodbye Says It All =

Single by Blackhawk

from the album Blackhawk
- B-side: "Let 'Em Whirl"
- Released: October 25, 1993
- Recorded: 1993
- Genre: Country
- Length: 3:24
- Label: Arista Nashville
- Songwriters: Charlie Black; Bobby Fischer; Johnny MacRae
- Producers: Mark Bright; Tim DuBois

Blackhawk singles chronology
"Goodbye Says It All" (1993)	"Every Once in a While" (1994)

"Goodbye Says It All" is a song by American country music band Blackhawk, written by Bobby Fischer, Charlie Black and Johnny MacRae. It was released in October 1993 as the lead single from their self-titled debut album. It peaked at No. 11 in the United States, and No. 29 in Canada. This song was heavily promoted on CMT.

== Content ==
The song's narrator is sneaking home from an unknown location (presumably a tavern or a nightclub) "thinking up an alibi", only to find that the house is entirely empty and all of its lights are on. He discovers that, instead of attempting a reconciliation, his significant other has left, writing the word "goodbye" in red lipstick on the living room wall before she leaves.

== Music video ==
The music video was directed by Marius Penczner. In the video, a man returns to a pontoon house to find that his significant other has abandoned him, and the word "goodbye" written in red lipstick on the exterior wall of the pontoon, and his belongings destroyed. She also leaves behind a videotape of her destroying his things. At the end of the video, the man drops the television set into the water, since his ex-girlfriend destroyed the television remote control.

== Charts ==
The song entered the Billboard Hot Country Songs chart the week of November 27, 1993, and peaked at number 11 the week of March 12, 1994.

Chart (1993–1994)	Peak position
Canada Country Singles (RPM)	29
US Bubbling Under Hot 100 (Billboard)	11
US Hot Country Songs (Billboard)	11
