= Henry Gross =

American singer-songwriter (born 1951)

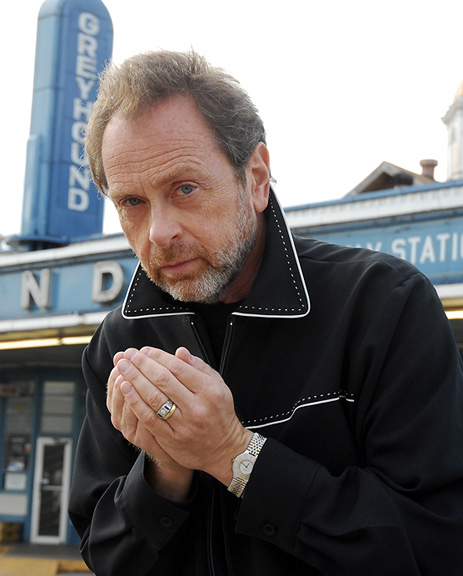
- Henry Gross at Greyhound Bus Station in Jackson, Tennessee, 2007

Background information
- Born: April 1, 1951 (age 75)
- Origin: Brooklyn, New York City, United States
- Genres: Rock; pop
- Occupations: Singer-songwriter; record label executive
- Instruments: Vocals; guitar; ukulele; electric sitar; percussion
- Years active: 1964–present
- Label: Zelda Records (presently)
- Website: henrygross.com

Henry Gross (born April 1, 1951) is an American singer-songwriter best known for his association with the group Sha Na Na and for his hit song, "Shannon". Gross is considered a one-hit wonder artist; none of his other songs reached the Top 20 on the Billboard Hot 100. However, his single "Springtime Mama" was a top 40 hit in the summer of 1976, peaking at #37.

== Early years ==
Gross was born in Brooklyn, New York City. At age 13 he performed at the New Jersey Pavilion at the World's Fair in Flushing, New York with his first band, The Auroras. By age 14 he was playing regularly in local clubs in the New York area, and spending his summers playing at Catskill Mountains resort hotels.

At age 18, while a student at Brooklyn College, Gross became a founding member of 1950s Rock & Roll revival group, Sha Na Na, playing guitar and wearing the greaser clothes he wore while a student at Midwood High School. The 18-year-old Gross was the youngest musician to perform at Woodstock.

== Going solo ==
Gross left Sha Na Na to become a solo singer-songwriter in 1970. He signed a recording contract with ABC Dunhill Records in 1971. While there, he did some session work for producers Tommy West and Terry Cashman. He played electric lead guitar on the Jim Croce album, I Got a Name. His own debut album had little commercial success. He continued to play at clubs and colleges until 1973, when he signed with A&M Records.

His first self-titled A&M album included several regional hits including "Simone", "Come On Say It", "Skin King", and a cover version of Lindisfarne's European hit, "Meet Me on the Corner". With Gross’s second A&M album, Plug Me into Something, he began to achieve national recognition in Rolling Stone and The New York Times.

== "Shannon" ==
Gross moved on to Lifesong Records to make his next album. He produced a single, "Shannon", a song written about the death of the dog of Beach Boys member Carl Wilson, who was named Shannon. The single went gold in the U.S. and became a worldwide hit, reaching No. 6 on the U.S. Billboard Hot 100 and No. 5 on the Cash Box Top 100 in 1976. In Canada it reached No. 1 in May of the same year. It also reached No. 1 in New Zealand, and No. 32 in the UK. After this single's success, Gross released the album, Release. His second single, "Springtime Mama", reached No. 37 in the US, selling nearly a million copies, and reaching No. 18 in Canada.

On his next album, Show Me to the Stage, Gross mixed rock and roll songs with Phil Spector and Brian Wilson influences. While the album sold well, it provided no hit singles. He also recorded The Beatles song "Help!" for the documentary, All This and World War II; both occurred in 1976. Gross's recording career slowed, but with CBS Records he made "Love Is the Stuff", and with Capitol Records in 1981, produced the What's in a Name album with Bobby Colomby.

As a session guitarist Henry performed on many records by other artists including Jim Croce (I Got A Name, ABC Records 1973) Judy Collins (Home Again, Elektra/ Asylum 1984), and Andy Kim (Baby, I Love You, Steed/Dot Records 1970).

His songs have been recorded by a variety of artists including Judy Collins, Mary Travers, Cyndi Lauper, Jonathan Edwards, Henry Paul, Blackhawk, Southside Johnny, Garry Tallent and Rob Stoner.

In the 1980s Gross performed in the road company production of Pump Boys and Dinettes with a cast featuring Jonathan Edwards (Sunshine) and Nicolette Larson (Lotta Love). Gross moved to Nashville, Tennessee in 1986 and signed a publishing deal with Pic-A-Lic Music, a company owned by songwriters Roger Cook and Ralph Murphy.

== 1990–present ==
Gross continued his songwriting and recording career in Nashville. In 1993, he released the album Nothing But Dreams on his own Zelda Records label, named after his mother. He had a Top 40 Country Radio hit, "Big Guitar" with Arista recording group Blackhawk, written with his friend Henry Paul, the group's lead singer. Gross released I'm Hearing Things on Zelda Records in 2001, his first self-engineered CD.

Gross performed an autobiographical one-man show called "One Hit Wanderer." According to the show's official website, performances of the show were suspended in 2020 as a result of the pandemic.

He continues to write new songs while regularly recording in Fort Myers, Florida with multi-instrumentalist and recording engineer John McLane, having produced eight albums with #9 nearly completed. One Hit Wanderer (2006), Foreverland (2007), Rhymes and Misdemeanors (2011) and Right as Rain (2011). A single, "What a Christmas", was released the same year. In 2011 he also collaborated with Henry Paul and Jonathan Edwards on a trio album called Edwards, Gross and Paul, AKA "The Vereens".

In 2016 Gross traveled to the UK to support longtime friend Joe Brown on his "Just Joe" UK tour. Brown and Gross played a selection of songs from each of their discographies, as well as a variety of popular rock & roll and country songs.

In early 2017, before leaving for the UK, Gross released two new CDs of original songs on Zelda Records: "Mixed Messages" and "Stories I've Lived To Tell" along with "New Orleans, New Orleans" – a collection of songs from a new musical comedy play of the same name, songs written by Gross and the libretto in collaboration with playwright Ed Greenberg.

In October 2017, Brown and Gross went back on tour in the UK with a live album, produced by Gross, recorded at the previous tour's first few shows. The tour ran through October and November 2017 before breaking for Christmas and continuing in January through March 2018.

In 2019, while doing many shows celebrating the 50th anniversary of the Woodstock Festival, Gross continued recording with multi-instrumentalist and engineer John McLane, completing and releasing the new 17 song CD, Too Clever (For My Own Good) in February 2020 on Zelda Records.

== Discography ==
=== Albums ===
- Sha Na Na Rock and Roll Is Here To Stay (1969) Buddha/ Kama Sutra Records
- Woodstock Soundtrack LP (1970) Cotillion/ Atlantic Records
- Henry Gross (1972) ABC Dunhill Records
- Henry Gross (1973) A&M Records (a.k.a. The Yellow Album), US BB # 204
- Plug Me into Something (1975) A&M Records, US BB # 26
- Release (1976) Lifesong Records, US BB # 64
- All This and World War II (1976) 20th Century Records
- Show Me to the Stage (1977) Lifesong Records, US BB # 176
- Love Is the Stuff (1978) Lifesong Records
- What's in a Name (1981) Capitol Records
- I Keep on Rockin' (1987) Sonet Records (currently available on Zelda Records)
- She's My Baby (1989) Sonet Records (currently available on Zelda Records)
- Nothing But Dreams (1992) Zelda Records
- " Plug Me Into Something" Pony Canyon Records, Japan (Best of A&M series)
- " Release/ Show Me to The Stage" Double CD (1992) Chiswick/ Lifelong Records UK
- One More Tomorrow: The Best of Henry Gross (1996) Varese Sarabande Records
- I'm Hearing Things (2000/2001) Zelda Records
- " Henry Gross" (Yellow Album)/ "Plug Me Into Something" double CD Zelda Records
- One Hit Wanderer (2006) Zelda Records
- Foreverland (2007) Zelda Records
- Rhymes and Misdemeanors (2011) Zelda Records
- Right as Rain (2011) Zelda Records
- Edwards, Gross & Paul (2011) Zelda Records. Trio with Jonathan Edwards (Sunshine) and Henry Paul (Outlaws, Blackhawk)
- " Release/ Show Me To The Stage" Double CD (2014) RE Release Chiswick/ Lifelong Records UK
- Mixed Messages (2017) Zelda Records
- Stories I've Lived To Tell (2017) Zelda Records
- New Orleans, New Orleans (2017) Zelda Records Songs from the new musical written and performed by Henry Gross. Libretto by Henry Gross and Ed Greenberg
- "Just Joe" Performed live on tour in UK 2017/18 by Joe Brown accompanied by Henry Gross. double CD produced by Henry Gross for Joe Brown Productions, UK
- "Too Clever (For My Own Good)" (2020) Zelda Records
- Release (2021) (Vinyl Reissue) Renaissance Records

=== Singles ===
- Simone (1974) US CB # 94
- Come On and Say It (1974) US BB # 109
- Meet Me On the Corner (1974) US RW # 122
- One More Tomorrow (1975) US BB # 93
- Shannon (1976) US BB # 6 US AC # 13, RIAA certification Gold, Canada #1
- Springtime Mama (1976) US BB # 37, Canada #18
- Someday (I Don't Want to Have to be The One) (1976) US BB # 85
- Painting My Love Song (1977) US BB # 110
- What a Sound (1977) US BB # 110

== See also ==
- List of 1970s one-hit wonders in the United States
