= Van Stephenson =

American singer-songwriter (1953–2001)

- Born: Van Wesley Stephenson; November 4, 1953; Hamilton, Ohio, U.S.
- Origin: Nashville, Tennessee, U.S.
- Died: April 8, 2001 (aged 47) Nashville, Tennessee, U.S.
- Genres: Rock, Pop rock, Country Rock, AOR
- Occupation: Singer-songwriter
- Instruments: Vocals, guitar
- Years active: 1981–2000
- Labels: MCA, Hivau, Arista Nashville
- Formerly of: Blackhawk

Van Wesley Stephenson (November 4, 1953 – April 8, 2001) was an American singer-songwriter. He scored three US Billboard Hot 100 hits in the 1980s as a solo artist, and later became tenor vocalist in the country music band BlackHawk in the 1990s. In addition, Van co-wrote several singles for other artists, such as Restless Heart. Stephenson died of melanoma in 2001.

== Biography ==
Stephenson was born in Hamilton, Ohio, but moved to Nashville, Tennessee, when he was ten years old, and he played in garage bands as a teenager. He graduated from seminary school and wrote songs on the side in the 1970s; his first chart hit as a songwriter was for Crystal Gayle, who cracked the US country Top Ten with his "Your Kisses Will" in 1979. Stephenson went on to write hits for Kenny Rogers, Dan Seals, Janie Fricke, and John Anderson. Partnering with Dave Robbins, Stephenson wrote a string of hits for Restless Heart and would continue to work with Robbins later in his career.

Stephenson landed a recording contract of his own with Handshake Records, through which he released his first solo album, China Girl, in 1981. He later signed with MCA, and his second album, Righteous Anger, was released in 1984. He scored big on the Billboard charts with "Modern Day Delilah" peaking at No. 22, and a second hit, "What the Big Girls Do", peaked at No. 45. Righteous Anger charted at No. 54 on the Billboard 200, but his follow-up 1986 disc, Suspicious Heart, did not chart, nor did its lead single, "We're Doing Alright." It also included two songs featured on movie soundtracks: "Make It Glamorous" from the 1984 film The Wild Life and "No Secrets" from the 1985 film Secret Admirer. Stephenson returned to songwriting duties until the early 1990s, when he became one-third of BlackHawk, a successful country group, through the end of the decade. In February 1999, Stephenson was diagnosed with melanoma and underwent surgery. He left the group in February 2000 to continue battling the cancer, but he died on the morning of April 8, 2001, as a result of the disease.

== Discography ==
=== Studio albums ===
Title	Release	Peak chart positions
Title	Release	US
China Girl	1981	—
Righteous Anger	1984	54
Suspicious Heart	1986	—

=== with BlackHawk ===
- Blackhawk (1994)
- Strong Enough (1995)
- Love & Gravity (1997)
- The Sky's the Limit (1998)

=== Singles ===
Title	Release	Peak chart positions		Album
Title	Release	US	US Main Rock	Album
"You've Got a Good Love Coming"	1981	79	—	China Girl
"Seeing Is Believing"	1982	—	—	China Girl
"Modern Day Delilah"	1984	22	9	Righteous Anger
"What the Big Girls Do"	1984	45	—	Righteous Anger
"No Secrets"	1985	—	—	Secret Admirer soundtrack
"We're Doing Alright"	1986	—	—	Suspicious Heart
"Suspicious Heart"	1986	—	—	Suspicious Heart

=== Soundtrack appearances ===
- "Make It Glamorous" (from The Wild Life) (1984)
- "All American Boy" (from The Slugger's Wife) (1985)
- "No Secrets", "You've Been Lied to Before" (from Secret Admirer) (1985)
