= Mark Bright (music producer) =

- Born: Mark David Bright; December 22, 1959 (age 65); U.S.
- Origin: Longview, Texas
- Genres: Country
- Occupation(s): Songwriter, record producer, music publisher
- Years active: 1993-present

Mark David Bright (born December 22, 1959) is an American country music producer, songwriter, and publishing company executive based in Nashville. His peers call Bright "one of the architects of the modern contemporary country sound". Bright's most noted success in producing records has been with the country acts BlackHawk, Rascal Flatts, and Carrie Underwood, but he has produced recordings for many artists including Reba McEntire, Sara Evans, Scotty McCreery, Lonestar, Peter Cetera, Brad Paisley, Luke Bryan, and Keith Urban

Bright's entry job in the music industry was in 1993 working as tape-splicer for Screen Gems/EMI Publishing in Nashville. Over the next 12 years he worked his way up to vice-president of the company. Arista Records president Tim DuBois gave Bright his first producing job with the band BlackHawk, which resulted in multi-platinum sales and spawned 13 additional albums produced by Bright, yielding album sales of over four million. Despite this success, Bright was not able to duplicate it in subsequent projects and was eventually terminated from EMI. After his departure, he was approached by EMI's competitor at the time, Sony/ATV, who offered him a joint venture in publishing, production and management. The new company, named "Teracel", prospered in its first year due in large measure to Bright's signing of songwriter Brett James, who created many commercially successful songs for various country artists.

In 1999, Bright heard three musicians who were performing in a bar in Nashville's Printer's Alley and thought their vocal harmonies had promise. The group, nameless at the time, was signed to a production and management deal and a recording contract by Bright, who developed them into the enormously successful trio "Rascal Flatts". Their first seven albums reached platinum sales and they eventually sold over 20 million albums.

Bright was tapped by Arista Nashville in 2005 to produce the debut album of that year's American Idol winner, Carrie Underwood. The album, Some Hearts, had unprecedented success winning three Grammy Awards, Best New Artist for Underwood, and was called Billboard Country Album of The Decade. Bright has continued to produce Underwood's music throughout her recording career including Underwood's NBC Sunday Night Football intro/theme songs. As of 2017, Underwood has had 21 number one hits produced by Bright. He sold Teracel Music in a highly lucrative transaction in 2006, then formed a new publishing company, "My Good Girl Music/Chatterbox Music" which was another a co-venture with Sony/ATV. From 2008 to 2010, Bright served as president and CEO of Word Entertainment, a Warner/Curb company representing Christian music artists. He served on the Board of Governors for The Recording Academy, Nashville chapter, and on the board of directors of the Country Music Association(CMA). Bright wrote songs for decades but never devoted much time to it; however, one of his songs became number one hit for George Strait and several of his songs have been recorded by successful artists.

== Early years ==
Bright grew up in Longview, Texas, where his parents, Delbert and Jean Bright moved in 1964. In his early teens Bright was diagnosed as being dyslexic; however, he excelled at music. He played drums, piano and guitar and performed in various bands through high school and college, but had no desire to be a performing artist. He was fascinated by the production side of music. At age 22, Bright came to Nashville and attended Belmont University. He got a job working in the Screen Gems/EMI music tape room. At first, his job was mundane, splicing demo tapes together onto large reels putting markers between each song. Using connections he had made at Belmont, he befriended David Briggs, the owner of a studio next door to where Bright worked. Briggs gave him a job as "third engineer" meaning that he did custodial work and was not allowed to touch the equipment at first, but was able to observe recording sessions. Over time he learned the technique of how to properly record music and he was allowed to make some demos at nights and on weekends. In doing so, he met many artists, publishers and songwriters in addition to honing his craft as a budding record producer.

== Success ==
Bright became friends with Tim DuBois, head of Arista Records in Nashville, who was not only a label executive but a creative-type person whom Bright naturally related to as a fellow "song junkie". The two enjoyed playing songs for each other and analyzing them critically, leading DuBois to recognize Bright's keen insight into what makes a commercially good song. DuBois had under contract three musicians whom he suggested work together rather than go for separate careers. The new trio was named "BlackHawk" and consisted of Henry Paul, Dave Robbins, and Van Stephenson. They recorded several songs, but DuBois was not happy with their sound and he asked Bright to spend time with them to come up with something with more commercial appeal. Bright collaborated with the band on intensive rehearsal sessions in a basement studio over several months, coming up with a bluegrass-type sound but with rock guitars, blending a mandolin and close vocal harmonies. Bright thought the sound was a "game changer". DuBois agreed and was willing to give Bright his first job as producer. Bright's production of BlackHawk's first single, "Goodbye Says It All" was released in 1993 and reached number 11 on the Billboard Country charts. Their next four songs were even more successful, all reaching the top ten. BlackHawk eventually sold over four million albums. Over a 12-year span Bright had ascended from the tape room to Vice President of EMI Publishing. With this extraordinary success, Bright said, "I thought I was king of the world". His success did not last. The next four acts he produced were failures and he was subsequently terminated by EMI. Bright stated "God kicked me back down the ladder. . . it was the worst thing in my life at that time." Later, EMI's then competitor, Sony/ATV approached Bright with a joint venture giving him his own publishing company, a production deal, and seed money for a management deal. He accepted, and with associate Marty Williams, co-founded the publishing company Teracel Music.

After founding Teracel, Bright met with singer/songwriter Brett James, who had been terminated from his own publishing deal and was at a low point. Bright agreed to sign him for very little money to help him out and James began turning out songs, but soon told Bright that he was going to medical school. He promised that he would still write songs every third day. He kept that promise, and wrote songs including "Jesus, Take the Wheel" and "Cowboy Casanova" for Carrie Undewood as well as songs recorded by Kenny Chesney, Martina McBride, Jason Aldean, and Jessica Andrews. By eight months into the Teracel endeavor, Bright had 44 songs recorded by major artists, largely through the songwriting of James. Bright said, "It was the hot streak of all times".

== Rascal Flatts ==
In 1999, Bright received a tip about a bluegrass act who was performing at a bar called "The Fiddle and Steel Guitar Bar" in Nashville's Printer's Alley. The group consisted of Gary Vernon (stage name "Gary LeVox"), Joe Don Rooney and Jay DeMarcus. After hearing them perform, Bright was impressed by their vocal blend and invited them to come to his office where they sang for him a cappella. Bright signed them to a recording, publishing, and management contract, and promptly took them into the studio to record three songs. At that time the band did not have a name; so, during a performance they asked their bar patrons to suggest one. A man came up at their intermission and suggested "Rascal Flatts", saying that he once had a band by that name in high school. They liked the name, and bought the rights to it on the spot for five thousand dollars using funds from their signing bonus. The agreement was written on a napkin. Bright auditioned the group for executives of Disney's Lyric Street Records who agreed on a recording contract, but Bright retained total creative control. It was a risky proposition at first, because all of the band's salaries, expenses, equipment, and pre-existing tour obligations had to be paid by Bright and his new company. Bright's employees took the band members to the gym regularly to get them in better physical shape. Bright worked incredible hours and told his wife, "If this flops, we'll have to sell the house". The band, Rascal Flatts, became an enormous success, their first seven albums were all certified platinum or higher in record sales by the Recording Industry Association of America (RIAA). As of 2009, they had sold 18.6 million albums. When the band learned that the Fiddle and Steel Guitar Bar would be closing to make room for a new hotel, they returned to the honky tonk for a final concert in November 2014. Band member Gary LeVox said, "This stage got us on stages around the world. We're forever indebted."

== Carrie Underwood ==
In the spring of 2005, Bright received a call from Joe Galante, chairman of Sony BMG Nashville, when Galante was meeting with Clive Davis. They called Bright to see if he would be interested in producing that year's American Idol winner, Carrie Underwood. Bright had seen Underwood on the show, but never dreamed that he would ever have an opportunity to be her producer. Galante said "I want you to meet her — if she likes you, you'll make a record". Bright flew to Kansas City with Galante to meet Underwood. Two weeks later, Bright and Underwood were in the studio making Some Hearts. Bright was unaware that a battle had ensued because Clive Davis wanted another producer, but Galante wanted Bright. Underwood liked Bright, and they developed a good working relationship. She said of Bright, "He'll say 'try something different there' but he doesn't tell me how to sing". Bright was given one month to produce her first album from beginning to end. At the time, Underwood was on the road with the American Idol Tour, so Bright had to go to wherever she was, taking her microphone and special equipment to local studios in San Francisco and Seattle to finish her vocal tracks. Davis wanted to hedge his bet on Underwood by having her album include pop as well as country songs, but Underwood did not like the pop material. Davis insisted that production of the album be split to where Dann Huff produced the pop songs, and Bright did the country. The final product, Some Hearts, released in 2005, won three Grammy Awards and Underwood won a Grammy for Best New Artist. The album became the best-selling solo female debut album in country music history and as of 2016, had sold 8 million copies. He also produced Underwood's NBC Sunday Night Football intro/theme songs. The first was "Waiting all day for Sunday night" which was replaced in 2016 using a new tune based on Underwood's country song "Somethin' Bad", but with new lyrics and other changes to fit the show. and changes the theme song again now is "Game On" for the 2018 NFL Season NBC Sunday Night Football.

== Later career ==
In 2006, Bright sold Teracel Music Publishing, along with Teracel's roster of writers which included Brett James and three members of Rascal Flatts, to Dimensional Music Publishing. According to industry analyst David Ross, the 2005 sale price was the highest multiple ever paid for a joint venture at that time. The Teracel catalog included the number one songs "When the Sun Goes Down" by Kenny Chesney, "These Days" by Rascal Flatts, "Blessed" by Martina McBride, and "Who I Am" by Jessica Andrews. In 2006, Bright founded "My Good Girl Music", which was another co-venture with Sony/ATV Music Publishing. In 2011, the company changed the name to "Chatterbox Music" keeping the same joint venture and personnel. The company had hit songs "Do You Believe Me Now" by Jimmy Wayne, "American Ride" by Toby Keith, and "Without You" by Keith Urban. Chatterbox Music closed its administrative offices in the spring of 2012. Bright then founded "Delbert's Boy Music". From 2008 to 2010, Bright served as president and CEO of Word Entertainment, a Warner/Curb company who represents Christian music artists.

As a songwriter, Bright co-wrote George Strait’s 60th number one hit, "Give It All We Got Tonight". The song was published by "Delbert's Boy Music", the publishing firm Bright owned. Bright had written songs for many years, but never devoted much time to it; nevertheless, Bright's compositions have been recorded by Shakira, Hayley Orrantia, Whitney Duncan, Ashley Gearing, and Carter Winter. Bright is a member of the board of Governors for The Recording Academy Nashville Chapter. He is a 2016 member of the Country Music Association (CMA) Board of Directors. He produced Sara Evans' number one hit "A Real Fine Place to Start" as well as Reba McEntire's longest running number one country hit "Consider Me Gone". Bright has also worked with Sting, Randy Travis, Keith Urban, Peter Cetera, Jo Dee Messina, Lonestar, Brad Paisley, Vince Gill, and Steven Tyler.

== Discography ==
=== Songwriting discography ===
| Year | Artist | Album | Credit |
|---|---|---|---|
| 1994 | Blackhawk | Blackhawk | Producer, engineer |
| 1995 | Blackhawk | Strong Enough | Producer |
| 1995 | Various Artists | The Best of Country Christmas, Vol. 5 | Producer |
| 1996 | Blackhawk | Star of Wonder: Country Christmas Collection | Producer, arranger |
| 1996 | Alan Vega | Dujang Prang | Illustrations |
| 1996 | Rick Orozco | Buscando Una Estrella | Producer |
| 1997 | Peter Cetera | You're the Inspiration: A Collection | Producer |
| 1997 | BlackHawk | Stone Country: Country Artists Perform the Songs of the Rolling Stones | Producer |
| 1997 | BlackHawk | Peace in the Valley [Arista] | Producer |
| 1997 | BlackHawk | Love & Gravity | Producer |
| 1997 | Kippi Brannon | I'd Be with You/"Daddy's Little Girl" | Producer |
| 1997 | Burnin' Daylight | Burnin' Daylight | Producer |
| 1997 | Jeff Wood | Between the Earth and the Stars | Producer |
| 1998 | Blackhawk | Today's Wild Country | Producer |
| 1998 | Blackhawk | The Sky's the Limit | Producer |
| 1999 | Blackhawk | Superstar Country Hits | Producer |
| 1999 | Chonda Pierce | Yes & Amen | Producer |
| 1999 | James Wesley | Life Goes On | Producer |
| 2000 | Blackhawk | Ultimate Country Party, Vol. 2 | Producer |
| 2000 | Blackhawk | Greatest Hits | Producer, vocals, choir/chorus |
| 2000 | John Debney | The Emperor's New Groove | Producer, arranger, vocal arrangement |
| 2000 | Shane McAnally | Shane McAnally | Producer |
| 2000 | Rascal Flatts | Rascal Flatts | Producer |
| 2001 | Jolie & the Wanted | Jolie & the Wanted | Producer |
| 2001 | Chonda Pierce | Four-Eyed Blonde | Producer |
| 2002 | Blackhawk | Totally Country, Vol. 2 | Producer |
| 2002 | Rascal Flatts | We Were Soldiers [Original Motion Picture Score] | Producer |
| 2002 | Rascal Flatts | We Were Soldiers [Soundtrack] | Producer |
| 2002 | The Shankman Twins | O Christmas Tree!: A Bluegrass Collection for the Holidays | Producer |
| 2003 | Rascal Flatts | Totally Country, Vol. 3 | Producer |
| 2004 | Blackhawk | Platinum & Gold Collection | Producer |
| 2004 | Malibu Storm | Photograph/Hammer And Nails | Producer |
| 2004 | Malibu Storm | Malibu Storm | Producer, audio production |
| 2004 | Rascal Flatts | Feels Like Today | Producer |
| 2005 | Joey Daniels | Take Me Off the Market | Producer, audio production |
| 2005 | Sara Evans | Real Fine Place | Producer, audio production |
| 2005 | Jo Dee Messina | Delicious Surprise | Producer, audio production |
| 2005 | Carrie Underwood | Some Hearts | Producer, audio production |
| 2006 | Mountain Heart | Wide Open | Producer, audio production, guitar |
| 2006 | Mountain Heart | Strummin' with the Devil: The Southern Side of Van Halen | Producer, guitar |
| 2006 | Sara Evans | She Was Country When Country Wasn't Cool: Tribute to Barbara Mandrell | Producer |
| 2006 | Lonestar | Mountains | Producer |
| 2006 | Lonestar | Everyone's Hero | Producer |
| 2006 | Megan Mullins | "Ain't What It Used to Be" | Producer |
| 2006 | Pinmonkey | Big Shiny Cars | Producer, acoustic guitar, audio production, mandolin |
| 2006 | Mark Schultz | Broken & Beautiful | Producer |
| 2006 | Jim Van Cleve | No Apologies | Producer |
| 2007 | Various | WOW Hits 2008 | Producer |
| 2007 | Various | Totally Country, Vol. 6 | Producer |
| 2007 | Lonestar | Super Hits | Producer |
| 2007 | BlackHawk | Super Hits | Producer |
| 2007 | Tim Krekel | Soul Season | Sax (Baritone) |
| 2007 | Miley Cyrus | Nickelodeon Kids Choice, Vol. 3 | Producer |
| 2007 | Various | More Country Heat 2007 | Producer |
| 2007 | Various | Hear Something Country: Christmas | Producer |
| 2007 | Sara Evans | Greatest Hits | Producer, Audio Production |
| 2007 | Rascal Flatts | Feels Like Today/Me and My Gang [Bonus Track] | Producer |
| 2007 | Alan Menken / Stephen Schwartz | Enchanted [Original Score] | Producer |
| 2007 | Carrie Underwood | Carnival Ride | Producer |
| 2007 | The Isaacs | Big Sky | Producer, Arranger, Audio Production |
| 2007 | Carrie Underwood | Before He Cheats | Producer |
| 2008 | Mark Schultz | Mark Schultz Gift Tin | Producer |
| 2008 | Carrie Underwood | How Great Thou Art: Gospel Favorites from the Grand Ole Opry | Producer, Audio Production |
| 2008 | Rascal Flatts | Greatest Hits, Vol. 1 | Producer |
| 2008 | Carrie Underwood | Grammy Nominees 2008 | Producer |
| 2008 | Alan Menken | Encantada [Original Soundtrack] | Producer |
| 2008 | Jimmy Wayne | Do You Believe Me Now? | Producer |
| 2008 | Various | Disneymania, Vol. 6 | Producer |
| 2008 | Disney | Disney Box Office Hits | Producer, Audio Production |
| 2008 | Various | Country Sings Disney | Producer |
| 2009 | Miley Cyrus | Hannah Montana/Hannah Montana: The Movie | Producer |
| 2009 | Reba McEntire | Strange [X3] | Producer |
| 2009 | Jimmy Wayne | Sara Smile | Producer |
| 2009 | Carrie Underwood | Play On | Producer |
| 2009 | Reba McEntire | Keep on Loving You | Producer |
| 2009 | Hannah Montana | Hannah Montana: The Movie | Producer |
| 2009 | Various | Country Heat 2010 | Producer |
| 2009 | Reba McEntire | Consider Me Gone | Producer |
| 2009 | Billy Ray Cyrus | Back to Tennessee | Producer, Audio Production |
| 2009 | Various | A Very Special Christmas 7 | Producer |
| 2010 | Whitney Duncan | Right Road Now | Producer, Co-Writer |
| 2010 | Danny Gokey | My Best Days | Producer |
| 2010 | Various | Country Heat 2011 | Producer |
| 2010 | Loretta Lynn | Coal Miner's Daughter: A Tribute to Loretta Lynn | Producer |
| 2011 | Mark Schultz | The Best of Mark Schultz | Producer |
| 2011 | Edens Edge | Amen | Producer |
| 2011 | Luke Bryan | Tailgates & Tanlines | Keyboards, Producer |
| 2011 | Various | My Country, Vol. 2: Smash Hits | Arranger, Producer |
| 2011 | Various | Footloose | Producer |
| 2011 | Scotty McCreery | Clear as Day | Producer, String Arrangements |
| 2011 | Randy Travis | Anniversary Celebration | Vocal Producer |
| 2011 | Various | American Idol: 10th Anniversary: The Hits, Vol. 1 | Producer |
| 2011 | Scotty McCreery | American Idol Season 10 Highlights | Producer |
| 2012 | Various | God Gave Me You: 12 Inspirational Hits from Today's Top Country Artists | Producer |
| 2012 | Various | Girls on Top [Sony] | Producer |
| 2012 | Edens Edge | Edens Edge | Producer |
| 2012 | George Strait | Give It All We Got Tonight | Co-writer |
| 2012 | Scotty McCreery | Christmas with Scotty McCreery | Producer |
| 2012 | Carrie Underwood | Blown Away | Producer |
| 2013 | A Rocket to the Moon | Wild & Free | Producer, Engineer |
| 2013 | Scotty McCreery | See You Tonight | Producer |
| 2013 | Sara Evans | Playlist: The Very Best of Sara Evans | Producer |
| 2013 | George Strait | Love Is Everything | Co-writer |
| 2013 | Sammy Kershaw | Big Hits, Vol. 1 | Co-writer |
| 2013 | Carrie Underwood | NBC Sunday Night Football Intro/Theme Song | Producer |
| 2014 | George Strait | The Cowboy Rides Away: Live from AT&T Stadium | Co-writer |
| 2014 | The Swon Brothers | The Swon Brothers | Producer |
| 2014 | Sara Evans | Slow Me Down | Producer |
| 2014 | Shakira | Shakira | Co-writer |
| 2014 | Carrie Underwood | NBC Sunday Night Football Intro/Theme Song | Producer |
| 2014 | Lucy Hale | Road Between | Producer |
| 2014 | Sara Evans | Original Album Classics, Vol. 2 | Producer |
| 2014 | Carrie Underwood | Greatest Hits: Decade #1 | Producer |
| 2015 | Luke Bryan | 4 Album Collection | Keyboards, Producer |
| 2015 | Mark Schultz | The Ultimate Collection | Producer |
| 2015 | Mark Schultz | Mom:A Son's First Love. A Daughters Best Friend | Producer |
| 2015 | Carrie Underwood | Storyteller | Producer |
| 2015 | Ashley Gearing | Ashley Gearing | Co-writer |
| 2015 | Carrie Underwood | NBC Sunday Night Football Intro/Theme Song | Producer |
| 2016 | Carter Winter | The Whiskey In Me | Producer, Co-writer |
| 2016 | Hayley Orrantia | Strong Sweet & Southern | Producer, Co-writer |
| 2016 | Carrie Underwood | NBC Sunday Night Football Intro/Theme Song | Producer |
| 2016 | Carrie Underwood | 2016 Grammy Nominees | Producer |
| 2017 | Carrie Underwood | NBC Sunday Night Football Intro/Theme Song | Producer |
| 2018 | Carrie Underwood | NBC Sunday Night Football Intro/Theme Song | Co-Producer with Cris Destefano |
| 2018 | Sierra Black | Make It Easy | Producer, Co-writer |
| 2020 | Sierra Black | Because I Want To | Producer, Co-writer |
| 2023 | Sierra Black | Dance Around It | Producer, Co-writer |
| 2023 | Sierra Black | Saving You Ain't My Job | Producer, Co-writer |
| 2023 | Sierra Black | Shotgun | Producer, Co-writer |
| 2023 | Moose Miller | Where The Wild Things Are | Producer |
| 2023 | Moose Miller | Time That Kills | Producer |
| 2023 | Moose Miller | Lovin' Me | Producer |
| 2023 | Moose Miller | Happily Die | Producer |
| 2023 | George Strait | 2023 NMPA Multi-Platinum Award | Co-writer |
| 2024 | Moose Miller | Nothing Left To Say | Producer, Co-writer |
| 2024 | Moose Miller | Everywhere I Go | Producer |
