= The Definitive Collection (Humble Pie album) =

Compilation album by Humble Pie
- Released: 2006
- Recorded: 1969–1975
- Genre: Rock
- Label: A&M
- Producer: Various

Humble Pie chronology
The Atlanta Years (2005)	The Definitive Collection (2006)	One More For the Old Tosser (2006)

Professional ratings
Review scores
Source	Rating
AllMusic	4.5/5 stars

The Definitive Collection is a compilation album by Humble Pie, released in 2006. It features tracks from all eight Humble Pie studio albums from the years 1969 to 1975, as well as tracks from the live album Performance Rockin' the Fillmore.

== Track listing ==
1. "Natural Born Woman (aka Natural Born Bugie)" single that was released to promote As Safe As Yesterday Is
2. "The Sad Bag of Shaky Jake" from Town and Country
3. "Big Black Dog" single only release
4. "Live With Me" from Humble Pie
5. "I'm Ready" from Humble Pie
6. "Shine On" from Rock On
7. "Stone Cold Fever" from Rock On
8. "Rollin' Stone" from Rock On
9. "Four Day Creep" (Live) from Performance Rockin' the Fillmore
10. "I Don't Need No Doctor" (Live) from Performance Rockin' the Fillmore
11. "Hot 'n' Nasty" from Smokin'
12. "C'mon Everybody" from Smokin'
13. "30 Days in the Hole" from Smokin'
14. "Black Coffee" from Eat It
15. "I Believe To My Soul" from Eat It
16. "Ninety-Nine Pounds" from Thunderbox
17. "Road Hog" from Street Rats
