= Steve Marriott discography =

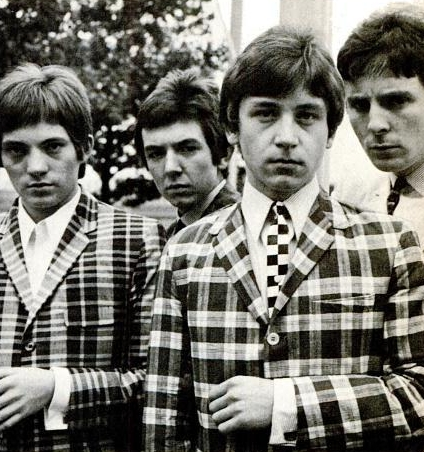
Marriott (at left) with Small Faces in 1965

Steve Marriott (1947–1991) was a successful and versatile English blue-eyed soul, singer-songwriter and guitarist. He is best remembered for his uniquely powerful voice and aggressive guitar in groups Small Faces (1965–1969) and Humble Pie (1969–1975). In England, Marriott became a popular and often-photographed mod style icon through his role as lead singer and guitarist with the Small Faces in the mid to late 1960s. Marriott's music was influenced from an early age by his heroes Buddy Holly, Booker T. & the M.G.'s, Ray Charles, Otis Redding, Muddy Waters, Bobby Bland and later the Rolling Stones. Marriott posthumously received an Ivor Novello Award in 1996 for his Outstanding Contribution to British Music, and was listed in Mojo (sister magazine to Q) as one of the top 100 greatest singers of all time.

== Album discography ==
Year	Album title	Tracks
1976	Marriott; A&M Records; This was Marriott's debut solo album from 1976 and features a British and an American side, reflecting the make-up of the bands backing Steve Marriott. The British side includes former Humble Pie colleague Greg Ridley on bass and vocals.	British Side: "East-Side Struttin'" "Lookin' For a Love" (Produced by Shel Talmy) "Help Me Through the Day" "Midnight Rollin'" "Wam Bam Thank You Mam; American Side: "Star in My Life" "Are you Lonely for Me Baby" "You Don't Know Me" "Late Night Lady" "Early Evening Light"
Year	Album title	Tracks
1984	Packet of Three; Steve Marriott's Packet of Three; Aura	"Whatcha Gonna Do About It" "Bad Moon Rising" "All Shook Up" "The Fixer" "All Or Nothing" "Five Long Years" "I Don't Need No Doctor"
Year	Album title	Tracks
1985	Live at the Sir George Robey 23-10-85; Steve Marriott's Packet of Three; Zeus (also available as Afterglow)	"Whatcha Gonna Do About It" "Fool for a Pretty Face" "Shame Shame Shame" "All or Nothing" "Talkin' 'bout You" "Five Long Years "Afterglow (Of Your Love)" "I Don't Need No Doctor" "This Train Stop at Memphis" "Tin Soldier"
Year	Album title	Tracks
1990	Marriott & Band; Steve Marriott's Packet of Three; Bellaphon 288-07-139	"Whatcha Gonna Do About It" "Bad Moon Rising" "All Shook Up" "The Fixer" "All or Nothing" "Five Long Years" "I Don't Need No Doctor"
Year	Album title	Tracks
1991	Live at Dingwalls 6.7.84; Mau Mau Records MAUCD609 expanded reissue of Packet of Three (1984) also released as Steve Marriott Voice of Humble Pie (May 2001)	"Whatcha Gonna Do About It" "Fool for a Pretty Face" "Shame Shame Shame" "Bad Moon Rising" "The Cockney Rhyme" "All Shook Up" "The Fixer" "All or Nothing" "Five Long Years" "Thirty Days in the Hole" "I Don't Need No Doctor" "Big Train Stop at Memphis" "Walkin' the Dog"
Year	Album title	Tracks
1993	30 Seconds to Midnite; Castle Communications CLACD 386	"Knocking on your Door" "All or Nothing" "One More Heartache" "The Um Um Um Um Um Song" "Superlungs" "Get Up, Stand Up" "Rascal You" "Life During Wartime" "Phone Call Away" "Clapping Song" "Shakin' All Over" "Gipsy Woman"
Year	Album title	Tracks
1996	Steve Marriott's Scrubbers; Repertoire REP 4603-WP	"Shake" "Mona" "Lend Us a Quid" "Send me some Loving" "She Moves Me Man" "Street Rat" "Captain Goatcabin's Balancing Stallions" "High and Happy" "Be My Baby" "It's all Over" "Bluegrass Interval" "Don't Take but a Few Minutes" "Louisiana Blues" "You're a Heartbreaker" "I Need a Star in my Life" "Cocaine" "I'll Find You" "Lord Let Me Hold Out" "Hambone" "Signed Sealed"
Year	Album title	Tracks
1999	Clear Through the Night; Steve Marriott's Packet of Three; New Millennium Cat.No. Pilot 22	"Midnight Rollin'" "Wham Bam Thank You Mam" "Street Rat" "High 'n' Happy" "Ruthy" "Shake" "Don't Take But a Few Minutes" "Cocaine" "Bluegrass Interval" "You're a Heartbreaker" "Be My Baby" "It's All Over" "The Things You Do" "Lord Help Me Hold Out" "I Need a Star in My Life" "Signed Sealed" "The Times they are a Changin'"
Year	Album title	Tracks
1999	New Millennium; Steve Marriott & The Official Receivers; NMC Cat.No.Pilot 23	Disc one: "Whatcha Gonna Do About It" "Don't Lie to Me" (Produced by Shel Talmy) "Mother-in-Law" "All or Nothing" "Knocking on Your Door" "My Girl" "Fool for a Pretty Face" "Five Long Years" "Shame Shame Shame" "Big Train" "Don’t Need No Doctor" "Tin Soldier" "Slowdown"; Disc Two: "Law of the Jungle" "Oh Well" "I Need a Love" "Lonely No More" "I Never Loved a Woman" "Stay With Me Baby" "I Just Wanna Make Love To You" "Ain’t You Glad" (New York Can’t Talk) "Skain’ All Over" "Toe Rag" "Watch Your Step"* "Let’s Work"* "Afterglow (Of Your Love)"** "If I Were A Carpenter"**; *Extended play disc "Whatcha Gonna Do About It" "Tin Soldier" "Fool for a Pretty Face" "All or Nothing" * DT's in Cologne ** Official Receivers in Germany
Year	Album title	Tracks
2000	Afterglow; Newsound NST 017 previously available as Live at the Sir George Robey	"Whatcha Gonna Do About It" "Fool for a Pretty Face" "Shame Shame Shame" "All or Nothing" "Talkin' 'bout You" "Five Long Years" "Afterglow (Of Your Love)" "I Don't Need No Doctor" "This Train Stop at Memphis" "Tin Soldier"
Year	Album title	Tracks
2000	Sing the Blues Live; Steve Marriott & The DTs released: October 2000; Edel America Records	"Watch Your Step" "Let's Work Together" "My Babe" "Get Yourself Another Man" "Take a Look at Yourself" "Walking the Dog" "Don't Lie To Me" "Five Long Years" "You Know I Love You" "All or Nothing" "They Take Your Money" "Put on your Red Dress"
Year	Album title	Tracks
2000	Live in Germany; Steve Marriott & The Next Band released: June 2000; Castle Music Cat.No. ESMCD898	"Watch Your Step" "Some Kind of Wonderful" "Fool for a Pretty Face" "Everything's gonna be Alright" "Big Train Stop at Memphis" "Whatcha Gonna Do About It" "I Don't Know Where I've Been" "Natural Born Bugie" "Five Long Years" "All or Nothing" "Tin Soldier" "Drum Solo" "30 Days in the Hole" "Just your Fool"
Year	Album title	Tracks
2000	The Legendary Majik Mijits; NMC Cat.No. Pilot56; Also, limited edition: 3000 double CD Majik Mijits released: 2003 with studio outtakes including new found unreleased tracks. Cat.No. Pilot196; Credits: Ronnie Lane: Vocals; Steve Marriott: Vocals, Guitar, Keyboard, Harmonica; Jim Leverton: Bass, Backing Vocals; Mick Green: Guitar; David Hynes: Drums, Backing Vocals; Mick Weaver: Keyboards	Disc One: "Chicken" (If The Cap Fits) "Last Tango in NATO" "Toe Rag" "That's the Way it Goes" "How Does it Feel" "You Spent It" "Bomber's Moon" "Birthday Girl" "Ruby Jack" "Lonely No More" "Son of Stanley Lane" "Be The One"; Disc Two: (initial pressing only) "Green Chicken" "Play it to NATO" "Toe Rag" (Instrumental) "Two Black Eyes & a Broken Nose" "Shut your Mouth" "You Spent It" (Instrumental) "Bombers Moon" "Birthday Girl" "Ruby Jack" "Lonely No More" (Instrumental) "Son of Stan" (Instrumental) "Beguine"
Year	Album title	Tracks
2001	Voice of Humble Pie released: May 2001 (Big Eye BIG 4083-2) note: this is also released as Live at Dingwalls	"What'Cha Gonna Do About It" "Fool for a Pretty Face" "Shame on You" "Bad Moon Rising" "The Cockney Rhyme" "All Shook Up" "The Fixer" "All or Nothing" "Five Long Years" "Thirty Days in the Hole" "I Don't Need No Doctor" "Big Train Stop at Memphis" "Walkin' the Dog"
Year	Album title	Tracks
2003	Signed Sealed; Alchemy Cat.No. STRTR165; A mix of tracks from Steve Marriott, including much of the Steve Marriott's All Stars album Clear Through the Night	"Midnight Rollin'" "Wham Bam Thank You Mam" "Oh Well" "Lonely No More" "Cocaine" "It's All Over" "Shake" "Street Rat" "Ruthy" "Stay with Me Baby" "You Spent It" "Don't Need No Doctor" (live) "Tin Solder" (live)
Year	Album title	Tracks
2004	Free and Single Volume 2 released: 28 August 2004 (IND004) free with The Independent Newspaper	Xpress 2 featuring David Byrne – "Lazy"; Philip Oakey & Giorgio Moroder – "Together In Electric Dreams"; Melanie C – "Never Be The Same Again"; Marc Almond & the Willing Sinners – "Stories of Johnny"; Gary Moore – "Power of the Blues"; Nick Heyward – "Whistle Down the Wind"; Brian Wilson – "Caroline No"; Steve Marriott – "Stay With Me Baby"
Year	Album title	Tracks
2004	About Face; Alchemy SBOX5 boxed set of three CDs, includes CDs that have previously been released as the individual artists	Steve Marriott: "Midnight Rollin'" "Wham Bam Thank You Mam" "Oh Well" "Lonely No More" "Cocaine" "It's All Over" "Shake" "Street Rat" "Ruthy" "Stay With Me Baby" "You Sport It" "Don't Need No Doctor" (live) "Tin Soldier" (live); Ronnie Lane: "The Poacher" "Ooh La La" "How Come" "Kuschty Rye" "Brother Can You Spare a Dime?" "Only You" "You Never Can Tell" "Chicken Wired" "One Step" "Just for a Moment"; Ronnie Wood: "Show Me" "Flying" "Always Wanted More" "Stay With Me" "I Know I'm Losing You" "It's Only Rock 'n' Roll" "Mona The Blues" "Woody's Thing" "Rooster Funeral" "Tonight's Number" "I Can Feel the Fire" (Live)
Year	Album title	Tracks
2005	Rainy Changes released: June 2005 Wapping Wharf Records a 2-CD set of rare Steve Marriott recordings including the complete Official Receivers album from 1987 and Steve's final recordings with Peter Frampton.	Disc One: "Intro" "Poor Man's Rich Man" "Dialogue" "Thirty Day Shuffle" "Heartbreaker" "Midnight of My Life" "Get Down to It" "It's All Over" "Think" "Dialogue" "Sea of Change" "I Need Your Love" (Like a Fish Needs a Raincoat) "Let's Spend the Night Together" "Infatuation" "Jesus Love Me" (The Blackberries on lead vocals) "Soldier" (Joe Brown) (with Los Angeles Philharmonic Orchestra) "Rainy Changes" "Toe Rag" (with 2-year-old son Toby Marriott) "Poll Tax Blues" "Dialogue"; Disc Two: "They Call it Love" "Run Rudolph Run" "Nobody But You" "Phone Call Away" "If You Find What You're Looking For" "Say the Word" "Sweet Nuthin's" "Looking Through at You" "Happy Birthday, Birthday Girl" "Some Kind of Wonderful" "Save your Love for Me" "An Itch you Can't Scratch" "Two Lane Fever" "Paying the Price" "I Never Loved a Woman" "Stay With Me Baby" "Oh Well" "Out of the Blue" "I Won't Let you Down" "Bigger They Come, Harder they Fall"
Year	Album title	Tracks
2006	Tin Soldier – The Steve Marriott Anthology; Label: Castle – released: 30 January 2006; Boxed set 3 CD's	Disc One: "Consider Yourself" (Oliver!) "Give Her My Regards" "Money Money" "What'cha Gonna Do 'Bout It" (French EP version) "I've Got Mine" "Hey Girl" "You Need Loving" "All Or Nothing" "Understanding" "I Can't Dance With You" "I Can't Make It" "Here Come The Nice" "Get Yourself Together" "Green Circles" (Italian version) "Don't Burst My Bubble" "Tin Soldier" "Lazy Sunday" "Rollin' Over" "Afterglow (Of Your Love)" "The Universal" "Donkey Rides, A Penny, A Glass" "Me, you & us Too" (demo of Wham Bam…) "Autumn Stone" "Every Little Bit Hurts" (BBC version); Disc Two: "Natural Born Bugie" "Buttermilk Boy" "Alabama 69" "Down Home Again" "Every Mother's Son" "Drown in my Own Tears" "Big Black Dog" "Live with Me" "Theme From Skint" "A Song For Jenny" "I Don't Need No Doctor" (single edit) "You're so Good for Me" "30 Days in the Hole" "Get Down To It" "Say No More" "Groovin' with Jesus" "Rally With Ali" "Funky to the Bone" "Fool for a Pretty Face" "Teenage Anxiety"; Disc Three: "Midnight Of My Life" "Early Evening Light" "Lookin' For A Love" "Lend us a Quid" "Soldier" "Cocaine" "High and Happy" "Brown Man Do" "Daddy Rollin' Stone" "Lonely No More" "Cockney Rhyme" "Big Train Stop at Memphis" (live) "My Girl" (live) "Watch your Step" (live) "If you find what you're Looking For" "Phone Call Away" "Knocking on your Door" "Poll Tax Blues" "I Won't Let you Down" "Bigger They Come, Harder They Fall" "Stay with Me Baby"
Year	Album title	Tracks
2006	Steve Marriott & The Official Receivers released: August 2006 Wapping Wharf label Two remastered live concerts from the 1980s	Disc One: "Whatcha Gonna Do About It" "Don't Lie To Me" "Mother in Law" "All or Nothing" "I Know" "My Girl" "Fool for a Pretty Face" "Five Long Years" "Shame Shame Shame" "Big Train Stop at Memphis" "Tin Soldier" "Slow Down"; Disc Two: "Some Kind of Wonderful" "Don't Lie to Me" "Mother in Law" "All or Nothing" "I Know" "Never Loved a Woman" "Whatcha Gonna Do About It" "Fool for a Pretty Face" "Five Long Years" "Tin Soldier" "Run Rudolph Run" "Walking the Dog" * Bonus – Swinging Radio England Interview 1988
Year	Album title	Tracks
2007	Wham Bam; Steve Marriott's Allstars released: April 2007 (Wapping Wharf label)	Disc one: "Wham Bam Thank You Mam" "Midnight Rollin'" "Nobody but You" "Barking Spiders" "Soldier" "Factory Girl" "They Call it Love" "Things You Do to Me" "Times They are a Changin'" "Round 4" "Scoffin' Crisps" "Ruthy" "That'll Do" "Run Rudolph Run" "Hey Mama" "Pissed as Rats" "Gimme Some Lovin'" "Midnight Rollin'" (Different Version); Disc two: "Get Off My Cloud" (with Alexis Korner) "Twist & Shout" (with the Blackberries) "Mind Your Own Business" (with Henry McCulloch) "Green Circles" (with Twice as Much) "Just Want to Make Love to You" (with Monica Törnell) "Get Off My Cloud" (with Alexis Korner, live version) "Good Times" (with the Easybeats) * Bonus interview with Cort Furnald 1986.
Year	Album title	Tracks
2009	All or Nuffin: The Final Performance	"Memphis, Tennessee (Instrumental)" "Watch Your Step" "Some Kind Of Wonderful" "Big Train Stops At Memphis" "Watcha Gonna Do About It" "Talkin' Bout You" "Silly Song" "Itchycoo Park" "Mr Pitiful" "Hallelujah I Love Her So" "Five Long Years" "All Or Nothing" "This Ol' Fool" "Natural Born Bugie" "Before You Accuse Me" "Why I Sing The Blues" "Man In Black" "Having A Good Time With Hermann" "Rainy Changes" "Berkshire Poppies" "Route 66 / Be Bob A Lula" "Steve Marriott Interview"
Year	Album title	Tracks
2020	Show That Girl A Good Time released: December 2020	"Show That Girl A Good Time"

== Pre-Small Faces single ==
1. "Give Her My Regards"/"Imaginary Love" (Label Decca) 7" released 1963

== Post-Humble Pie singles ==
1. "Star in my Life"/"Midnight Rolling" (Label:A&M) 7" Released:1976
2. "Star in my Life"/"East Side Strutting" (Label:A&M) 7" Released:1976 Netherlands
3. "Star in my Life" (one side mono/one side stereo) (Label:A&M) 7" Released:1976 USA
4. "Lookin' for a Love"/"Kayoed by Love" (Label:Atlantic) 7" Released:1977 - Small Faces MK II
5. "Stand by Me (Stand by You)"/"Hungry and Looking" (Label:Atlantic) 7" Released:1977 – Small Faces MK II
6. "Filthy Rich"/"Over too Soon" (Label:Atlantic) 7" Released:1978 – Small Faces MK II
7. "Whatcha Gonna Do About It"/"All Shook Up" (Label:Aura) 7" Released:1985 – Packet of Three
8. "All or Nothing"/"Clapping Song" (Label:Possum) 7" Released:1989 Australia
9. "The Um Um Um Um Um Song (The Um Um Song)"/"I Never Loved a Woman (The Way I Love You)" (Label:Trax) 7" Released:1989
10. "Poll Tax Blues" (Label:Celtic) 7" (Released:1990) – The Pollcats

== Steve Marriott Interview ==
Released: 2002 MOLCD45
Rare interview with Steve Marriott conducted in April 1976.

== See also ==
- The Small Faces discography
- Humble Pie (band)
- Steve Marriott
- Steve Marriott - All Too Beautiful...

== References/Notes ==
Notes:

References:

- Paolo Hewitt John Hellier (2004). Steve Marriott - All Too Beautiful.... Helter Skelter Publishing ISBN 1-900924-44-7.
- Paolo Hewitt/Kenney Jones (1995) small faces the young mods' forgotten story – Acid Jazz ISBN 0-9523935-0-6
