= Extended Versions (Humble Pie album) =

Live album by Humble Pie (band)
- Released: August 15, 2000
- Recorded: May 6, 1973
- Venue: Winterland Theatre, San Francisco, California
- Genre: Rock, Hard rock, Punk blues
- Length: 1:03:08
- Label: BMG Special Products

Humble Pie (band) chronology
''Running With the Pack (1999)	Extended Versions (2000)	''Natural Born Boogie The BBC Sessions (2000)

Extended Versions is a live album by Humble Pie, released in 2000, as part of BMG's Encore Collection. It has tracks taken from the King Biscuit Flower Hour Presents - Humble Pie In Concert, which was a 1996 release of a concert recorded on May 6, 1973 at San Francisco's Winterland Theatre. The only track not included here from that release is "I Don't Need No Doctor".

== Track listing ==
Extended Versions
No.	Title	Writer(s)	Length
1.	"Up Your Sleeves"	Steve Marriott	3:57
2.	"4 Day Creep"	Ida Cox	3:34
3.	"C'mon Everybody"	Jerry Capehart, Eddie Cochran	7:21
4.	"Honky Tonk Woman"	Mick Jagger, Keith Richards	5:41
5.	"Stone Cold Fever"	Peter Frampton	2:03
6.	"Blues I Believe To My Soul"	Ray Charles	5:19
7.	"30 Days in the Hole"	Marriott	7:50
8.	"Road Runner"	Lamont Dozier, Brian Holland, Eddie Holland	12:28
9.	"Hallelujah, I Love You So"	Ray Charles	7:37
10.	"Hot N' Nasty"	Clem Clempson, Marriott, Greg Ridley, Jerry Shirley	7:18
Total length:			1:03:08

== Band ==
- Steve Marriott - Guitar, vocals
- Clem Clempson - Guitar, backing vocals
- Greg Ridley - Bass guitar, vocals
- Jerry Shirley - Drums
