= The Sad Bag of Shaky Jake =

Single by Humble Pie

from the album Town and Country
- B-side: "Cold Lady"
- Released: 12 December 1969 (EU)
- Recorded: 1969, London
- Genre: Rock
- Length: 2:57
- Label: Immediate
- Songwriter(s): Steve Marriott
- Producer(s): Glyn Johns, Humble Pie

Humble Pie singles chronology
"Natural Born Bugie" (1969)	"The Sad Bag of Shaky Jake" (1969)	"Big Black Dog" (1970)

"The Sad Bag of Shaky Jake" is a single released in 1969 by English rock band Humble Pie. The B-side "Cold Lady" was written by drummer Jerry Shirley in a R&B style and Shirley plays Wurlitzer piano and guitarist Peter Frampton plays the drums.

Although released in a number of European countries, including West Germany and the Netherlands, it was not made available in the United Kingdom or other worldwide territories. The first live performance of this song by the band was during their appearance at the beginning of the Bilzen Festival in Belgium, on 29 August 1969. The same follows their recording-and-broadcast for the BBC, on 7 August 1969, at the Lime Grove Studios, Shepherd's Bush, west London,

== Personnel ==
=== "The Sad Bag of Shaky Jake" ===
- Steve Marriott — vocals, Wurlitzer electric piano, harmonica
- Peter Frampton — vocals, lead guitar
- Greg Ridley — vocals, bass guitar
- Jerry Shirley — drums

=== "Cold Lady" ===
- Steve Marriott – lead vocals, acoustic guitar, maracas
- Peter Frampton – backing vocals, drums
- Greg Ridley – backing vocals, bass guitar
- Jerry Shirley – Wurlitzer electric piano, tambourine
