= Street Rats =

Studio album by Humble Pie
- Released: February 1975
- Recorded: January 1975
- Studios: Olympic Studios, London and Marriott's Clear Sounds Studio Essex
- Genres: Blues rock, hard rock
- Label: A&M
- Producers: Andrew Loog Oldham, Steve Marriott

Humble Pie chronology
Thunderbox (1974)	Street Rats (1975)	On to Victory (1980)

Steve Marriott chronology
Thunderbox (1974)	Street Rats (1975)	Marriott (1976)

Professional ratings
Review scores
Source	Rating
AllMusic	2/5 stars

Street Rats is the eighth studio album by the English rock group Humble Pie, released in 1975. The album went to number 100 on the US Billboard 200 album chart.

== Background ==
Street Rats was created at the same time as Steve Marriott was producing a solo album, and a collaboration album with Greg Ridley. He was not keen on producing another Humble Pie album, and did not want to tour the U.S. again, as they had been touring solidly for the past four years.

While on the road, everything they wanted was paid for, but once they got back to England four years and 21 tours later there was no money in the bank. They were loath to tour and promote another album. Marriott: "We'd been on tour for about four years, and we were just very tired". But A&M as well as manager Dee Anthony were able to insist that Humble Pie were contracted to do another tour, and to do so without another album would have been an unwise move by the band.

In early 1975, the record company, tired of waiting for the new album, "confiscated" material from Marriott's Clear Sounds Studio, but much of the material was not meant for Humble Pie; it was for a solo album and for his on-going project with Ridley. To make the best of a bad situation, A&M brought in Andrew Loog Oldham to mix and cut up the tracks and make them heavier, much to the disgust of Marriott. The title Street Rats was also thought up by A&M. Not surprisingly the band were never happy with the album, with Ridley saying: "It was terrible". Clem Clempson elaborated on this. "The mixes were done by someone outside the band, [Oldham], and when we heard it we were horrified". Marriott (1975): "'Street Rats' was a track with me, Ian Wallace and Tim Hinkley playing piano. It was nothing to do with Humble Pie…. Somebody stole the 16-track mix [ ] It was intended as the title track for my album".

The album has different mixes for the US version. The UK version also has the track "Funky to the Bone" in place of "There 'Tis," Marriott stated in an interview that the song had nothing to do with Humble Pie. "It was just musicians up in my studio!"

Five of the albums' eleven songs are covers; "Rain", "We Can Work it Out" and "Drive My Car" from The Beatles; "Rock and Roll Music" by Chuck Berry and "Let Me Be Your Lovemaker" by Reid/Clark/Wright and originally recorded by R&B artist Betty Wright in 1973. There are two songs written by Marriott, "Street Rats" and "Road Hog". The remaining three are collaborations between the various band members.

The album was produced by Loog Oldham and Marriott; it was recorded in Olympic Studios and Marriott's Clean Sounds studio at his home in Essex, England.

The last word on the album by Ridley: "Humble Pie were better than that, but we were not really consulted."

After the release of this album and their farewell tour, Humble Pie disbanded, citing musical differences. Marriott went on to produce his first solo album Marriott and promptly moved back to the UK.

== Track listing ==
1. "Street Rat" (Steve Marriott) - 2:52 (Lead Vocal: Steve) (Drums: Ian Wallace)
2. "Rock and Roll Music" (Chuck Berry) - 2:55 (Lead Vocal: Greg)
3. "We Can Work It Out" (John Lennon, Paul McCartney) - 3:18 (Lead Vocal: Steve)
4. "Scored Out" (Clem Clempson, Marriott) - 2:43 (Lead Vocal: Steve)
5. "Road Hog" (Marriott) - 3:08 (Lead Vocal: Steve)
6. "Rain" (Lennon, McCartney) - 3:58 (Lead Vocals: Steve and Greg)
7. "There 'Tis" (Marriott, Clempson) - 3:06 (Lead Vocal: Steve)
8. "Let Me Be Your Lovemaker" (Clarence Reid, Willie Clarke, Betty Wright) - 5:57 (Lead Vocal: Greg)
9. "Countryman Stomp" (Greg Ridley, Clempson, Tim Hinkley) - 2:20 (Lead Vocal: Greg)
10. "Drive My Car" (Lennon, McCartney) - 3:43 (Lead Vocal: Greg)
11. "Queens and Nuns" (Clempson, Marriott, Ridley, Jerry Shirley) - 3:04 (Lead Vocal: Steve)

=== 2010 & 2016 Japanese reissue ===
Track 1 to 11 are Original UK mix

1. "Street Rat" (Steve Marriott) - 2:52 (Lead Vocal: Steve) (Drums: Ian Wallace)
2. "Rock and Roll Music" (Chuck Berry) - 2:55 (Lead Vocal: Greg)
3. "We Can Work It Out" (John Lennon, Paul McCartney) - 3:18 (Lead Vocal: Steve)
4. "Scored Out" (Clem Clempson, Marriott) - 2:43 (Lead Vocal: Steve)
5. "Road Hog" (Marriott) - 3:08 (Lead Vocal: Steve)
6. "Rain" (Lennon, McCartney) - 5:58 (Lead Vocals: Steve and Greg)
7. "Funky To The Bone" (Fred Gowdy, Larry Wilkins) - 3:07
8. "Let Me Be Your Lovemaker" (Clarence Reid, Willie Clarke, Betty Wright) - 5:57 (Lead Vocal: Greg)
9. "Countryman Stomp" (Greg Ridley, Clempson, Tim Hinkley) - 2:20 (Lead Vocal: Greg)
10. "Drive My Car" (Lennon, McCartney) - 3:43 (Lead Vocal: Greg)
11. "Queens and Nuns" (Clempson, Marriott, Ridley, Jerry Shirley) - 3:04 (Lead Vocal: Steve)
12. "Big Black Dog" (Humble Pie) – 4:05 (bonus track for CD release)
13. "Mister Ring" (G. Ridley) – 4:24 (bonus track for CD release)
14. "The Outcrowd" (G. Ridley) – 2:51 (bonus track for CD release)
15. "I Don't Need No Doctor (Nick Ashford, Valerie Simpson, Jo Armstead) (Single Version From Performance Rockin' the Fillmore" – 3:58 (bonus track for CD release)

== Personnel ==
Humble Pie

- Steve Marriott – guitar, harmonica, keyboards, vocals, producer
- Clem Clempson – guitar, slide guitar
- Greg Ridley – bass guitar, vocals
- Jerry Shirley – all drums except on "Street Rat"

Additional personnel

- Mel Collins – saxophones
- Tim Hinkley – keyboards
- Ian Wallace – drums on "Street Rat"

== Charts ==
Chart (1975)	Peak position
Canada Top Albums/CDs (RPM)	98
US Billboard 200	100

== Tour ==
Date	City	Country	Venue
15 February 1975	New York City	United States	Academy Of Music
17 February 1975	Detroit	United States	Cobo Arena
19 February 1975	Atlanta	United States	Municipal Auditorium
21 February 1975	Pittsburgh	United States	Civic Arena
22 February 1975	Boston	United States	Orpheum Theatre
24 February 1975	Chicago	United States	International Amphitheatre
25 February 1975	Madison	United States	Dane County Coliseum
26 February 1975	St Louis	United States	Kiel Auditorium
28 February 1975	New Orleans	United States	The Warehouse
1 March 1975	New Orleans	United States	The Warehouse
5 March 1975	Fresno	United States	Selland Arena
7 March 1975	San Francisco	United States	Winterland Arena
8 March 1975	San Francisco	United States	Winterland Arena
9 March 1975	Sacramento	United States	Sacramento Convention Centre
12 March 1975	Charleston	United States	Charleston Civic Centre
13 March 1975	Louisville	United States	Louisville Gardens
14 March 1975	Salem	United States	Salem-Roanoke Valley Civic Centre
15 March 1975	Philadelphia	United States	The Spectrum
16 March 1975	Columbus	United States	Veterans Memorial Auditorium
17 March 1975	Buffalo	United States	Kleinhans Music Hall
19 March 1975	Dallas	United States	Municipal Auditorium
20 March 1975	Baton Rouge	United States	Independence Hall
21 March 1975	San Antonio	United States	Municipal Auditorium
22 March 1975	Houston	United States	Sam Houston Coliseum
23 March 1975	Tulsa	United States	Tulsa Fairgrounds Pavilion
