= Shine On (Humble Pie song) =

- German release picture sleeve

Single by Humble Pie

from the album Rock On
- B-side: "Mister Ring"
- Released: 7 May 1971
- Recorded: 1971
- Genre: Hard rock, blues rock
- Label: A&M
- Songwriter: Peter Frampton
- Producers: Glyn Johns, Humble Pie

Humble Pie singles chronology
"Big Black Dog" (1970)	"Shine On" (1971)	"I Don't Need No Doctor" (1971)

"Shine On" is a song by British rock band Humble Pie from their 1971 album Rock On. It was written by Peter Frampton. The B-side of the single is "Mister Ring", written by Greg Ridley.

Rock On was the last studio album to feature Frampton. He would later perform the song in his concerts, to be featured on his album Frampton Comes Alive!

== Personnel ==
=== "Shine On" ===
- Peter Frampton - lead vocals, lead guitar
- Steve Marriott - Hammond organ
- Greg Ridley - bass guitar
- Jerry Shirley - drums, percussion

Soul Sisters

- P. P. Arnold, Doris Troy, Claudia Lennear - backing vocals

=== "Mister Ring" ===
- Greg Ridley - vocals, bass guitar
- Peter Frampton - lead and rhythm guitar
- Steve Marriott - lead and rhythm guitar
- Jerry Shirley - drums
