= D'Anthony =

D'Anthony is a given name. Notable people with this name include the following:

- D'Anthony Batiste (born 1982), American football player
- D'Anthony Bell (born 1996), American football player
- D'Anthony Smith (born 1988), American football player

== See also ==
- Les Aventures d'Anthony, 2015 Chinese film
- De'Anthony
- Dee Anthony
