= Humble Pie (album) =

Studio album by Humble Pie
- Released: July 1970
- Recorded: 1970
- Studio: Olympic Studios, London, England
- Genre: Hard rock; blues rock; folk rock
- Length: 42:37
- Label: A&M
- Producer: Glyn Johns

Humble Pie chronology
Town and Country (1969)	Humble Pie (1970)	Rock On (1971)

Professional ratings
Review scores
Source	Rating
AllMusic	link

Humble Pie is the third studio album by English rock band Humble Pie. Released in 1970, it was their first album with A&M Records.

== Background ==
This was their first release under the auspices of new American manager Dee Anthony – who had pushed for a louder, tighter sound both live and in the studio – and for their new label, A&M Records. At the end of 1969, Humble Pie's old label, Immediate, owned by Andrew Loog Oldham, had gone bankrupt – a saga chronicled by Marriott on the satirical ballad "Theme from Skint (See You Later Liquidator)".

== Music and packaging ==
Humble Pie was a transitional album and a harbinger of the band's new, heavier direction. The material was darker than their previous two efforts, with striking contrasts in volume and style – Peter Frampton's gentle "Earth and Water Song" is buttressed between two of the heaviest tracks on the record, the band-composed "One Eyed Trouser Snake Rumba", and a cover of Willie Dixon's "I'm Ready". Drummer Jerry Shirley contributed a rare lead vocal on his song "Only a Roach", a country-twinged ode to cannabis that also appeared as the B-side of the summer 1970 single "Big Black Dog".

Humble Pie is often referred to by fans as the Beardsley Album as the main feature of the cover artwork is The Stomach Dance, a 1893–94 drawing by English illustrator-author Aubrey Beardsley, who is known for his Japanese woodblock influenced grotesque, decadent, and erotic illustrations. The inside of the gate-fold album features the band. The back cover is the second version of the George Frederic Watts oil painting "Hope"; and, is the back photo on the Japanese remastered version of 2016.

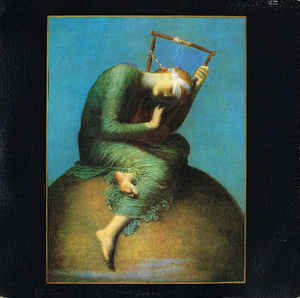
George Frederic Watts second oil-painted version of "Hope"

== Track listing ==
1. "Live With Me" – (Humble Pie) – 7:55
2. "Only a Roach" – (Shirley) – 2:49
3. "One Eyed Trouser Snake Rumba" – (Humble Pie) – 2:51
4. "Earth and Water Song" – (Frampton) – 6:18
5. "I'm Ready" – (Willie Dixon) – 4:59
6. "Theme from Skint (See You Later Liquidator)" – (Marriott) – 5:43
7. "Red Light Mamma, Red Hot!" – (Humble Pie, lyrics – Marriott) – 6:16
8. "Sucking on the Sweet Vine" – (Ridley) – 5:46

== Personnel ==
Humble Pie

- Steve Marriott – vocals (1–3, 5–7), guitar (1, 3, 5–7), Wurlitzer piano (1, 4, 8), piano (2, 6), organ (4), harmonica (7)
- Peter Frampton – vocals (1–7), organ (1), percussion (2), guitar (3–8)
- Greg Ridley – bass (all tracks), vocals (1–3, 5–8), guitar (8)
- Jerry Shirley – drums (1, 3–8), guitar (2), vocals (2), percussion (6, 7)

Additional musicians

- B.J. Cole – pedal steel guitar (2, 6, 8)
- Willie Wilson – drums (2)

Technical staff

- Recorded by Glyn (The Man) Johns at Olympic Sound Studios, London
- Mutual Ideas by Glyn Johns / Humble Pie
