= Eat It (album) =

1973 album by Humble Pie

Studio album by Humble Pie
- Released: March 1973
- Studios: Steve Marriott's Clear Sounds home studio, (Essex); Green’s Playhouse, Glasgow (side 4)
- Genres: Blues rock, hard rock, arena rock
- Length: 64:30
- Label: A&M
- Producer: Humble Pie

Humble Pie chronology
Smokin' (1972)	Eat It (1973)	Thunderbox (1974)

Professional ratings
Review scores
Source	Rating
AllMusic	3/5 stars

Eat It is the sixth album by English rock band Humble Pie, released in March 1973 through A&M Records. Released as a double album, it peaked at number 13 on the US Billboard 200, number 34 in the UK Albums Chart, and number 9 in Australia.

== Background ==
Steve Marriott had been talking to the group about having backing singers from early on. During the recording of Eat It, he had been in touch with Venetta Fields and asked her to find two other women to help her out. Fields chose Clydie King and Sherlie Matthews (both previously with Raeletts) to become the Blackberries and flew to London. When Marriott asked them to perform on tour with Humble Pie, Sherlie Matthews declined due to other commitments, including her two children and her husband. Matthews chose Billie Barnum to be missing member of the Blackberries.

Each side of this double album is different: side 1 features Steve Marriott penned rock and roll; side 2 has classic R&B covers; side 3 is a collection of acoustic Steve Marriott songs; side 4 features Humble Pie live in concert at Green's Playhouse in Glasgow, Scotland.

Eat It was the band's seventh official album release and their fifth for A&M Records. [This was also their third double LP (two-record set) within 18 months, the other two being 1971's Performance Rockin' The Fillmore and the late 1972 A&M compilation - Lost & Found.]

Marriott produced the album and it was the first album recorded in Marriott's newly built home recording studio Clear Sounds, in a converted barn at Beehive Cottage, Moreton, Essex.

== Track listing ==
=== Side one ===
1. "Get Down to It" (Marriott) – 3:25
2. "Good Booze and Bad Women" (Marriott) – 3:11
3. "Is It for Love?" (Marriott) – 4:39
4. "Drugstore Cowboy" (Marriott) – 5:35

=== Side two ===
1. "Black Coffee" (Ike Turner, Tina Turner) – 3:09
2. "I Believe to My Soul" (Ray Charles) – 4:03
3. "Shut up and Don't Interrupt Me" (Johnny Bristol, Edwin Starr) – 2:58
4. "That's How Strong My Love Is" (Roosevelt Jamison) – 3:44

=== Side three ===
1. "Say No More" (Marriott) – 1:58
2. "Oh, Bella (All That's Hers)" (Marriott) – 3:25
3. "Summer Song" (Marriott) – 2:42
4. "Beckton Dumps" (Marriott) – 3:13

=== Side four ===
1. "Up Our Sleeve" (Humble Pie, lyrics by Steve Marriott) – 4:57
2. "Honky Tonk Women" (Keith Richards, Mick Jagger) – 4:03
3. "Road Runner" (Eddie Holland, Lamont Dozier, Brian Holland) – 13:28

== Personnel ==
Humble Pie

- Steve Marriott - guitars, harmonica, keyboards, remixing, vocals
- Dave "Clem" Clempson - guitars, backing vocals
- Greg Ridley - bass, backing vocals
- Jerry Shirley - drums

The Blackberries:

- Billie Barnum - vocals
- Clydie King - vocals
- Venetta Fields - vocals

Guests:

- B.J. Cole - pedal steel guitar
- Sidney George - saxophone

Album production:

- Chris & Irish - Engineer
- Fin Costello - Inside photo, photography
- Michael Doud - Creative Director
- Kosh - Art Director and Designer
- Jim McCrary - Photography

== Charts ==
Chart (1973)	Peak position
Australian Albums (Kent Music Report)	41
Canada Top Albums/CDs (RPM)	10
UK Albums (Official Charts)	34
US Billboard 200	13

== Releases ==
- 1973 LP A&M Cat.#3701
- 1973 LP A&M Cat.#3701 (2)
- 1999 CD Import Cat.#10593
- 1973 A&M Cat.#1889
- 2006 CD Universal Cat.#6231 Japan
- 2007 CD Universal Cat.#93223
- 2007 CD Universal Cat.#93223 Japan
- 2017 LP Box Disc 5 A&M ('The A&M Vinyl Boxset 1970-1975', released on 16 June 2017)
