= Big Black Dog =

Single by Humble Pie
- B-side: "Strange Days"
- Released: 1970
- Recorded: 1970
- Genre: Hard rock
- Length: 4:07
- Label: A&M
- Songwriter(s): Peter Frampton

Humble Pie singles chronology
"The Sad Bag of Shaky Jake" (1969)	"Big Black Dog" (1970)	"Shine On" (1970)

"Big Black Dog" is a single released in 1970 by English rock band Humble Pie, one of the first British supergroups to form in 1969. It was the band's first single for A&M Records and the follow-up single to "Natural Born Bugie" (1969). It was written by the band's guitarist, Peter Frampton.

The B-side, "Strange Days," is credited to Steve Marriott and Humble Pie. It later appeared on the group's fourth album, Rock On. In Germany, the B-side was "Only a Roach", which was an ode to cannabis, written and sung by drummer Jerry Shirley.

== Personnel ==
=== "Big Black Dog" ===
- Steve Marriott - vocals, rhythm guitar
- Peter Frampton - vocals, lead guitar
- Greg Ridley - vocals, bass guitar
- Jerry Shirley - drums

=== "Strange Days" ===
- Steve Marriott - vocals, piano, Hammond organ
- Peter Frampton - lead guitar, percussion
- Greg Ridley - bass guitar, percussion
- Jerry Shirley - drums, percussion
