= De'Anthony =

De'Anthony is a given name. Notable people with the name include:

- De'Anthony Melton (born 1998), American basketball player
- De'Anthony Thomas (born 1993), American gridiron football player

== See also ==
- D'Anthony
- Dee Anthony
