= Hot 'n' Nasty =

Single by Humble Pie

from the album Smokin'
- B-side: "You're So Good for Me"
- Released: April 1972
- Recorded: 1972
- Genre: Boogie rock
- Length: 3:22
- Label: A&M
- Songwriters: Steve Marriott, Humble Pie

Humble Pie singles chronology
"I Don't Need No Doctor" (1971)	"Hot 'n' Nasty" (1972)	"30 Days in the Hole" (1972)

"Hot 'n' Nasty" is the sixth single by English rock band Humble Pie, one of the first supergroups of the 1960s-'70s. Released in 1972, the song peaked at No. 52 on the US Billboard Hot 100 singles chart and No. 35 in Canada. The B-side is "You're So Good for Me".

The song appears on their fifth studio album, Smokin', also released in 1972.

== Personnel ==
- Steve Marriott - lead and backing vocals, Hammond organ, piano
- Clem Clempson - guitar
- Greg Ridley - bass guitar
- Jerry Shirley - drums

Featuring

- Stephen Stills - backing vocals

== Cover versions ==
The song was covered by Japanese duo Superfly and included as a track on their 2007 debut single "Hello Hello".
