= 30 Days in the Hole =

Single by Humble Pie

from the album Smokin'
- B-side: "Sweet Peace and Time"; "C'mon Everybody"
- Released: September 1972
- Recorded: February 1972 at Olympic Studios, London
- Genre: Hard rock; blues rock
- Length: 3:58
- Label: A&M
- Songwriter: Steve Marriott
- Producer: Humble Pie

Humble Pie singles chronology
"Hot 'n' Nasty" (1972)	"30 Days in the Hole" (1972)	"Black Coffee" (1973)

Audio
- "30 Days in the Hole" on YouTube

"30 Days in the Hole" is a song by English rock band Humble Pie. Released in late 1972, it was composed by the band's guitarist/singer Steve Marriott for the group's fifth album Smokin' (1972). The song received minor airplay at the time and failed to chart. However, it gained a following on album oriented rock (AOR) and classic rock radio formats, and consequently remains one of Humble Pie's best-known songs.

The B-side on its US release was "Sweet Peace and Time", while everywhere else the B-side featured "C'mon Everybody" and "Road Runner".

The song, a Steve Marriott composition, bemoans being arrested for possession of small quantities of illegal drugs, including cocaine; Durban poison, a potent strain of marijuana; and Red Lebanese and Black Nepalese, two types of hashish. "New Castle Brown" is often mistaken as a reference to Newcastle Brown Ale but actually refers to heroin also known as "Brown" or "Smack".

Guitarist Clem Clempson has said it is one of the tracks for which he would most like to be remembered. But the predominant group personality shown through by the song is Marriott's; so much so that, years later, Clempson was asked about efforts to reform the group without Marriott and said "It's a waste of time."

== Live versions ==
Marriott regularly played the song in the 1980s with his band Packet Of Three (with Jim Leverton and Jerry Shirley). The song was included in a 1984 concert at Dingwalls released as a live album two years later and a 1985 televised concert at the Camden Palace posthumously released on DVD and CD.

== Cover versions ==
In the years since, "30 Days" has been recorded by several artists, most notably Gov't Mule, Mr. Big, Ace Frehley, The Black Crowes, Kick Axe, and The Dead Daisies, and is a live staple of Canadian rock band The Trews.

== Personnel ==
=== Humble Pie ===
- Steve Marriott - vocals, guitar, harmonica, electric piano
- Clem Clempson - guitar, backing vocals
- Greg Ridley - bass, backing vocals
- Jerry Shirley - drums
