= The Apostolic Intervention =

British rock band

- Also known as: The Little People
- Origin: Hertfordshire, England
- Genres: Beat; rhythm and blues; psychedelic rock
- Years active: 1965–1967
- Label: Immediate
- Past members: Angus Shirley; Peter "Dino" Dines; Bob Argent; Jerry Shirley

The Apostolic Intervention were a British rock band in the mid-1960s, who are best known for their 1967 single "(Tell Me) Have You Ever Seen Me?".

The band originally formed in Hertfordshire in late 1965 as The Little People, and comprised Angus Shirley (lead guitar), Peter "Dino" Dines (organ, vocals), Bob Argent (bass), and Angus' younger brother Jerry Shirley (drums). They began by playing covers of American R&B records, and emulated the music of their heroes, The Small Faces. After they supported the latter band on a local bill, Steve Marriott became their mentor, and persuaded Andrew Loog Oldham of Immediate Records to sign them in early 1967. Marriott wanted them to change their name to The Nice, but Oldham insisted on them using the name The Apostolic Intervention, giving the name The Nice to another band instead. Marriott offered the band a song that he and Ronnie Lane had written, "Tell Me (Have You Ever Seen Me)", producing their single and playing bass on the record in preference to Bob Argent. The record failed to make the charts, and the song was soon recorded by The Small Faces themselves on their album Small Faces (issued in the US in a different form as There are But Four Small Faces). Further attempts at recording The Apostolic Intervention were unsuccessful, and the band split up before the end of 1967. Dines and Jerry Shirley joined Tim Renwick in a band known variously as Little Women and the Wages of Sin. Dines later joined the Keef Hartley Band and T. Rex, while Shirley played sessions before joining Steve Marriott in Humble Pie in 1969.

"Tell Me (Have You Ever Seen Me)" by The Apostolic Intervention has subsequently featured on several compilations of British psychedelic music, and has been described as "as solid a single as Immediate released from a new act in its history, catchy and filled with hooks, as well as showing off some superb playing."
