= As Safe as Yesterday Is =

Studio album by Humble Pie
- Released: August 1969
- Recorded: 1969
- Studios: Olympic Studios, London
- Genre: Blues rock
- Length: 47:20
- Label: Immediate
- Producer: Andy Johns

Humble Pie chronology
| As Safe as Yesterday Is (1969) | Town and Country (1969) |

Professional ratings
Review scores
| Source | Rating |
|---|---|
| AllMusic | link |
| Disc and Music Echo | 3/4 stars |
| Encyclopedia of Popular Music | 3/5 stars |
| The Rolling Stone Record Guide (1st ed, 1979) | 3/5 stars |
| The New Rolling Stone Record Guide (2nd ed, 1983) | 4/5 stars |
| The Rolling Stone Album Guide (3rd ed, 1992) | 3/5 stars |

As Safe as Yesterday Is is the debut studio album by English rock band Humble Pie, released in August 1969. The band had been formed by singer/guitarists Steve Marriott and Peter Frampton. The album features a blend of heavy blues, hard rock, pastoral folk, and post-mod pop music. It peaked at number 32 in the UK Albums Chart.

== Background ==
While the group, featuring Steve Marriott (former frontman of Small Faces) and Peter Frampton (former frontman of the Herd), had technically formed in January 1969, Marriott's final touring commitments to his former band followed by legal wrangles with Frampton's old management had delayed any album releases until August, during which time the band rehearsed and recorded enough material to fill at least three albums.

== Songs ==
Marriott contributed six songs to the album, one co-written with Frampton, who also contributed two solo efforts. The opening track is a cover version of Steppenwolf's "Desperation". The track "Growing Closer" was written by ex–Small Faces keyboardist Ian McLagan, who rehearsed with Humble Pie early on, before deciding to regroup with Small Faces bandmates Kenney Jones and Ronnie Lane as the Faces, joined by newcomers Rod Stewart and Ron Wood.

The single-only track "Wrist Job" (the UK B-side of "Natural Born Bugie") is a reworking/completion of an unnamed backing track that Marriott originally wrote for the Small Faces, which was provisionally titled "The Pig's Trotters" by either the staff at Immediate Records or by future Small Faces archivists. It is thought to be one of the last tracks Marriott recorded with the Small Faces before leaving them in early 1969, and if finished it may have been intended for the band's abandoned fourth album. This original version of the track was not officially released until it appeared on the Small Faces' first complete Immediate recordings box set in 1995. Humble Pie's finished version of the track, now complete with lyrics, had long been rumoured to prominently feature Small Faces keyboardist Ian McLagan. In truth however, while McLagan is indeed known to have rehearsed with the new group at least once while considering his post-Small Faces options, the distinctive keyboard part on the Humble Pie recording is performed by Marriott himself.

Embryonic versions of "Bang!" and "What You Will" were recorded in French by singer Johnny Hallyday in December 1968, with the Small Faces and Peter Frampton serving as Hallyday's backing group. Although now recognised as solely Marriott compositions, the Hallyday versions of "Bang!" and "What You Will" were recorded before the Small Faces' breakup in January 1969, and so there the music was credited to Marriott and Lane (as per the duo's publishing agreement that saw both credited no matter which of them actually composed a particular song).

== Reception ==
American rock critic Mike Saunders is credited with one of the first coinings of the term "heavy metal" for a genre in a 1970 review of As Safe as Yesterday Is for Rolling Stone, in which he wrote: "Here they were a noisy, unmelodic, heavy metal-leaden shit-rock band, with the loud and noisy parts beyond doubt." (Note: The cited source notes an earlier use of the term in an early 1970 Lester Bangs review of Canned Wheat by The Guess Who.)

New Musical Express called it "a good LP and one that will grow in estimation with each listen," though "a sameness on certain numbers" was observed. A review in Melody Maker said, "Critically speaking Humble Pie aren't offering anything particularly new. It would be nice to hear more of their instrumental and vocal ability showcased as it gets submerged in the production, but as a team they work well together and given a fair chance and hearing, the group will develop into an important musical entity." A retrospective review by heavy metal historian Martin Popoff gave the album an 8 out of 10 and noted "a Stonesy rock 'n' roll immediacy gripping the proceedings, a number of these tracks sounding very much like the blueprint for The Black Crowes, especially Desperation and the title track, both languid and loud, confident at the road ahead."

== Track listing ==
Side one

1. "Desperation" (John Kay) – 6:28
2. "Stick Shift" (Peter Frampton) – 2:22
3. "Buttermilk Boy" (Steve Marriott) – 4:22
4. "Growing Closer" (Ian McLagan) – 3:13 (US version omitted "Growing Closer" in favour of the single "Natural Born Woman")
5. "As Safe as Yesterday Is" (Frampton, Marriott) – 6:05

Side two

1. "Bang!" (Marriott) – 3:24
2. "Alabama '69" (Marriott) – 4:37
3. "I'll Go Alone" (Frampton) – 6:17
4. "A Nifty Little Number Like You" (Marriott) – 6:11
5. "What You Will" (Marriott) – 4:20

CD bonus tracks

1. "Natural Born Bugie" (Marriott) (Single A-side) – 4:12
2. "Wrist Job" (Marriott) (Single B-side) – 4:14

== Personnel ==
Humble Pie

- Steve Marriott – vocals, guitar (1, 3, 5, 6, 9, 10), slide guitar (2), acoustic guitar (7), harmonica (4, 7), organ (2-3, 5, 9-10), “goofs” (9), tablas (4), piano (6)
- Peter Frampton – vocals, guitar, slide guitar (7), organ (1), tabla (5), bass tablas (7), piano (3, 8, 10)
- Greg Ridley – bass, vocals (1, 3, 4, 5, 6, 10), “happy noise” (7), percussion (5), skins (4)
- Jerry Shirley – drums, “grins and explosions” (1), percussion (4, 5, 7), tablas (7), harpsichord (8), “big ones” (2), piano (5), “lead thumbs” (3)

Additional musicians

- Lyn Dobson – flute (4, 7), sitar (7)

Technical personnel

- Andy Johns – producer
- Arranged: Humble Pie

== Charts ==
| Chart (1969) | Peak position |
|---|---|
| Dutch Albums (Album Top 100) | 6 |
| UK Albums (Official Charts) | 32 |
