= Smokin' (Humble Pie album) =

Studio album by Humble Pie
- Released: March 1972
- Recorded: February 1972
- Studio: Olympic (London)
- Genres: Blues rock; hard rock
- Length: 43:48
- Label: A&M
- Producer: Humble Pie

Humble Pie chronology
Performance: Rockin' the Fillmore (1971)	Smokin' (1972)	Eat It (1973)

Professional ratings
Review scores
Source	Rating
AllMusic	4/5 stars
The Rolling Stone Album Guide	1/5 stars

Smokin' is the fifth studio album by English rock band Humble Pie, released in 1972 by A&M Records. It was the band's international commercial breakthrough, peaking at number 6 on the US Billboard 200 album chart, and hit number 20 in the UK and number 9 in Australia.

== Background ==
The album was Humble Pie's first following the departure of guitarist Peter Frampton, which placed singer and co-founder Steve Marriott as the band's de facto leader. Smokin' is the band's best-selling album, due in large part to the success of the single "30 Days in the Hole". It is the first group's album to feature Frampton's replacement Clem Clempson on guitar.

Smokin' includes dramatically slowed down versions of Eddie Cochran's "C'mon Everybody", Junior Walker's "Road Runner", and the wah-wah laden slow blues "I Wonder". "You're So Good for Me", which begins as a delicate acoustic number, ultimately mutates into a full-bore gospel music rave-up, an element that would later influence bands like The Black Crowes.

Alexis Korner guests on the track "Old Time Feelin'", Marriott's vocals take a back seat as the main vocals are provided by Clem Clempson and Korner who also plays a Martin Tiple, mandolin-type guitar. Its sound is reminiscent of the song "Alabama '69" on their first album.

Stephen Stills guests on "Road Runner 'G' Jam" (the title is a nod to the band's habit of developing songs out of jam sessions), by adding his backing vocals that were over-dubbed on "Hot 'n' Nasty" a slow-burning and then dynamic R&B song, after he strolled in after recording his own sessions next door.

Marriott insisted on producing the album himself for the challenge of creating a compact R&B sound with a high-tech 24-track mixing board. Marriott collapsed with exhaustion in February. The New Musical Express (NME) reported at the time: "Following intense recording sessions with Humble Pie, Steve Marriott collapsed with nervous exhaustion and doctors told him to rest".

With this album the group were seen as leaders of the boogie movement in the early 1970s.

== Track listing ==
Side one
No.	Title	Writer(s)	Length
1.	"Hot 'n' Nasty"	Marriott / Ridley / Clempson / Shirley	3:22
2.	"The Fixer"	Marriott / Ridley / Clempson / Shirley	5:02
3.	"You're So Good for Me"	Marriott, Ridley	3:50
4.	"C'mon Everybody"	Jerry Capehart, Eddie Cochran	5:13
5.	"Old Time Feelin'"	Traditional, lyrics by Marriott	4:00

Side two
No.	Title	Writer(s)	Length
6.	"30 Days in the Hole"	Marriott	3:57
7.	"Road Runner/Road Runner's 'G' Jam"	Holland-Dozier-Holland, Humble Pie	3:43
8.	"I Wonder"	Cecil Gant, Raymond Leveen	8:53
9.	"Sweet Peace and Time"	Marriott / Ridley / Clempson / Shirley	5:48
Total length:			43:48

== Personnel ==
Humble Pie

- Steve Marriott – lead and backing vocals, guitar, harmonica, keyboards
- Clem Clempson – guitar, keyboards, backing vocals, lead vocals on "Old Time Feelin'"
- Greg Ridley – bass, backing vocals
- Jerry Shirley – drums, piano on "You're So Good for Me"

Additional personnel

- Alexis Korner – vocals, tiple (similar sound to mandolin) on "Old Time Feelin'"
- Stephen Stills – backing vocals on "Hot 'n' Nasty"
- Doris Troy – backing vocals "You're So Good for Me"
- Madeline Bell – backing vocals "You're So Good for Me"

Production

- Album cover art designed by Kosh
- Engineers: Alan O'Duffy, Keith Harwood
- Recorded at Olympic Studios, London, February 1972.
- Produced by The Pie

== Charts ==
=== Weekly charts ===
Chart performance for Smokin'
Chart (1972)	Peak position
Australian Albums (Kent Music Report)	9
Canada Top Albums/CDs (RPM)	13
German Albums (Offizielle Top 100)	26
UK Albums (Official Charts)	20
US Billboard 200	6

=== Year-end charts ===
Year-end chart performance for Smokin'
Chart (1972)	Position
US Billboard 200	36

== Certifications ==
Region	Certification	Certified units/sales
United States (RIAA)	Gold	500,000^{^}
^{^} Shipments figures based on certification alone.

== Release history ==
- 1990 CD A&M
- 1972 LP A&M
- 1990 CS A&M
- 2007 CD Universal
- 1995 CD Universal/A&M
- 2007 CD Universal Japan
- 2017 LP Box Disc 4 A&M ('The A&M Vinyl Boxset 1970–1975', released on 16 June 2017)
