= Thunderbox (album) =

Album by Humble Pie

Studio album by Humble Pie
- Released: February 1974
- Recorded: Olics Sound
- Genre: Hard rock
- Length: 43:00
- Label: A&M
- Producer: Steve Marriott

Humble Pie chronology
Eat It (1973)	Thunderbox (1974)	Street Rats (1975)

Professional ratings
Review scores
Source	Rating
AllMusic	2/5 stars

Thunderbox is the seventh studio album by English hard rock group Humble Pie, released in 1974. It reached number 52 on the US Billboard 200 album chart. The planned UK release was cancelled.

== Background ==
Twelve songs appear, seven of them covers, including "Grooving With Jesus" originally released by The Violinaires; Ann Peebles song "I Can't Stand the Rain" once referred to by John Lennon as the perfect single; "Anna (Go to Him)" originally written and performed by Arthur Alexander and recorded by The Beatles on their first album; and "Oh La-De-Da" by The Staple Singers.

The word Thunderbox is a seventeenth century slang word for the toilet, which gives an example of Humble Pie's sense of humour. The cover shows a keyhole through which a woman can be seen sitting on a toilet.

== Track listing ==
1. "Thunderbox" (Marriott, Clempson)
2. "Groovin' with Jesus" (Gene Barge, Bennie Swartz)
3. "I Can't Stand the Rain" (Ann Peebles, Don Bryant, Bernard Miller)
4. "Anna (Go to Him)" (Arthur Alexander)
5. "No Way" (Marriott, Ridley)
6. "Rally with Ali" (Marriott, Clempson, Ridley, Shirley)
7. "Don't Worry, Be Happy" (Marriott, Clempson, Ridley, Shirley)
8. "Ninety-Nine Pounds" (Don Bryant)
9. "Every Single Day" (Clempson)
10. "No Money Down" (Chuck Berry)
11. "Drift Away" (Mentor Williams)
12. "Oh La-De-Da" (Phillip Mitchell)

== Personnel ==
Humble Pie

- Steve Marriott – guitar, harmonica, keyboards, lead vocals
- Dave "Clem" Clempson – guitar, slide guitar, backing vocals
- Greg Ridley – bass, backing vocals; lead vocals on "Drift Away"
- Jerry Shirley – drums, backing vocals; piano on "I Can't Stand the Rain"

With guest:

- Mel Collins – horns
- Special thanks to The Blackberries:
  - Carlena Williams – vocals
  - Venetta Fields – vocals
  - Billie Barnum – vocals

Technical staff

- Hipgnosis – original album sleeve design
- Arranged and produced by The Pie
- Recorded at Olics Sound, somewhere east of Guatemala
- Editing: Alan O'Duffy

== Charts ==
Chart (1974)	Peak position
Canada Top Albums/CDs (RPM)	58
US Billboard 200	52

== Tour ==
Date	City	Country	Venue
15 February 1974	Orlando	United States	
16 February 1974	Miami	United States	Miami Stadium
17 February 1974	Tampa	United States	Curtis Hixon Convention Hall
19 February 1974	Mobile	United States	
21 February 1974	Hampton	United States	Hampton Coliseum
22 February 1974	Richmond	United States	Robins Centre
24 February 1974	Baltimore	United States	Baltimore Civic Centre
25 February 1974	Toledo	United States	Toledo Sports Arena
26 February 1974	Kalamazoo	United States	Miller Auditorium
27 February 1974	St Louis	United States	Kiel Auditorium
1 March 1974	Terre Haute	United States	Hulman Centre
3 March 1974	Knoxville	United States	
4 March 1974	Chattanooga	United States	Memorial Auditorium
6 March 1974	Uniondale	United States	Nassau Coliseum
8 March 1974	Hershey	United States	Hersheypark Arena
9 March 1974	Binghamton	United States	Memorial Arena
10 March 1974	Utica	United States	Memorial Auditorium
11 March 1974	Boston	United States	Boston Music Hall
13 March 1974	Buffalo	United States	Memorial Auditorium
14 March 1974	Flint	United States	IMA Auditorium
15 March 1974	Louisville	United States	Convention Center
17 March 1974	Columbia	United States	University Auditorium
18 March 1974	Atlanta	United States	The Omni
22 March 1974	Memphis	United States	Ellis Auditorium
18 May 1974	London	United Kingdom	Charlton Football Ground
6 June 1974	London	United Kingdom	Rainbow Theatre
6 July 1974	Buxton	United Kingdom	Booth Farm
16 August 1974	Bilzen	Belgium	Dell
20 September 1974	Bracknell	United Kingdom	Sports Centre
