= The Company of Snakes =

English rock band (1998–2005)

- Also known as: The Snakes, M3
- Origin: England
- Genres: Blues rock, hard rock
- Years active: 1998–2005
- Label: SPV
- Past members: Bernie Marsden; Micky Moody; Jørn Lande; Sid Ringsby; Willy Bendiksen; Don Airey; Neil Murray; John Lingwood; Robert Hart; Gary Barden; Stefan Berggren; Jimmy Copley; Mark Stanway; Doogie White

The Company of Snakes were an English rock band formed in 1998 by former members of Whitesnake who were also members of The Snakes. They released two albums before morphing into M3 during 2004.

== History ==
The Company of Snakes was formed by former Whitesnake guitarists Bernie Marsden and Micky Moody after the demise of its predecessor The Snakes. The band was completed by Black Sabbath and Whitesnake bassist Neil Murray, drummer John Lingwood from Manfred Mann's Earth Band and vocalist Robert Hart from Bad Company and later British singer Gary Barden. After adding keyboardist Don Airey from Rainbow, the band went on tour, playing concerts almost completely consisting of old Whitesnake songs. Singer Barden left the band soon afterwards and was replaced by Swedish vocalist and Snakes in Paradise frontman Stefan Berggren. They toured throughout their history and released the live album Here They Go Again: the show was still sung by Barden, but his lead vocals were deleted and replaced in the studio by Berggren (2001). They were joined in Germany, during their promotional tour for this album by Humble Pie, re-formed by Jerry Shirley and promoting tracks from their album Back on Track. The band recorded one studio album Burst the Bubble (2002) which was recorded after Don Airey had left the band. Berggren left soon after Airey's departure and the remaining band members morphed into M3. After that, Micky Moody and Neil Murray went on to form Snakecharmer.

== Members ==
- Bernie Marsden – Lead guitar (1998–2004)
- Micky Moody – Slide & Rhythm guitar (1998–2004)

=== The Snakes ===
- Jørn Lande – lead vocals (1998–1999)
- Sid Ringsby – bass (1998–1999)
- Willy Bendiksen – drums (1998–1999)
- Don Airey – Keyboards (1998–1999)

=== The Company of Snakes ===
- Neil Murray – Bass guitar (1999–2002)
- John Lingwood – Drums (1999–2002)
- Don Airey – Keyboards (1999–2002)
- Ian Paice – Drums (2000)
- Jon Lord – Keyboards (2000)
- Robert Hart – Vocals (2000)
- Gary Barden – Vocals
- Stefan Berggren – Vocals (2000–2002)

=== M3 ===
- Neil Murray – Bass guitar (2003–2004)
- Jimmy Copley – Drums (2003–2004)
- Mark Stanway – Keyboards (2003–2004)
- Stefan Berggren – Vocals (2004)
- Doogie White – Vocals (2004)
- Tony Martin – Vocals (2003–2004)

== Discography ==
Year	Artists	Title	Type
1998	The Snakes	Once Bitten...	Studio
1998	The Snakes	Live in Europe	Live
2000	The Company of Snakes	Endangered Species: Live at Abbey Road	Live
2001	The Company of Snakes	Here They Go Again	Live
2002	The Company of Snakes	Burst the Bubble	Studio
2003	M3	Classic Snake Live	Live
2005	M3	Rough an' Ready	Live DVD
