= Back on Track (Humble Pie album) =

Studio album by Humble Pie
- Released: 19 February 2002
- Recorded: Dec 2001 – Jan 2002 Tracks 7–9 recorded at Jacobs studios Tracks 1–6 and 10 recorded at Astoria Studios
- Genre: Blues rock, hard rock
- Length: 37:28
- Label: Sanctuary
- Producer: Andy Jackson, Dave Colwell

Humble Pie chronology
Live at the Whiskey A-Go-Go '69 (2002)	Back on Track (2002)

Professional ratings
Review scores
Source	Rating
AllMusic	2/5 stars

Back on Track is the eleventh studio album by Humble Pie recorded after Jerry Shirley re-formed the band in 2001 with a line-up including their original bassist Greg Ridley, guitarist and vocalist Bobby Tench and the new addition of guitarist Dave "Bucket" Colwell, who wrote or co-wrote seven of the ten tracks on this album. Back on Track was released by Sanctuary in UK and Europe on 19 February 2002. Keyboard players Zoot Money and Victor Martin were brought in for the Back on Track recording sessions. The album was recorded at Jacobs Studios and Astoria Studios and the CD cover cites special thanks to David Gilmour.

The album and band line up had many of the elements which had contributed to Humble Pie's musical chemistry, with two of the original sidemen to Steve Marriott, Shirley and Ridley re-united with well respected former band member Tench. The promotional Back on Track tour of UK and then Germany with Company of Snakes followed and the response to the live shows was encouraging, but Greg Ridley fell ill late in 2002 and the band split up. Back on Track was another example of a Humble Pie album whose sales were limited by the curtailment of tour schedules due to illness.

== Track listing ==
1. "Dignified" (Dave Colwell) – 3:28
2. "Real Thing" (Colwell, Mick Lister) – 3:36
3. "Trouble" (Greg Ridley) – 4:07
4. "Ain't No Big Thing" (Colwell, Jerry Shirley, Bobby Tench) – 3:56
5. "Stay One More Night" (Colwell, Robert Hart) – 5:20
6. "Still Got a Story to Tell" (Colwell) – 4:12
7. "All I Ever Needed" (Colwell) – 3:23
8. "This Time" (Shirley, Charlie Huhn) – 3:34
9. "Flat Busted" (Shirley, Huhn) – 3:52
10. "Between Old Teddy and Your Mum" (Colwell, Bob Halligan Jr.) – 4:16

== Personnel ==
Humble Pie

- Bobby Tench — lead guitar (tracks 2–5, 7, 8), lead vocals (tracks 1, 2, 5, 9, 10), backing vocals (tracks 2–4, 6, 8), guitar (tracks 1, 6, 9)
- Dave "Bucket" Colwell — guitar (tracks 2–4, 6–8, 10), lead guitar (tracks 1, 9), acoustic guitar (tracks 5, 6, 10), mandolin (tracks 5, 6, 10), dobro (track 7)
- Greg Ridley — bass guitar (all tracks), lead vocals (tracks 3, 4, 6, 7), backing vocals (tracks 1, 8, 9)
- Jerry Shirley — drums (all tracks)

Additional personnel

- Zoot Money – Hammond organ (tracks 7–9), piano (tracks 7, 8), lead vocals (track 8), backing vocals (track 9)
- Victor Martin – Hammond organ (tracks 2, 5, 6)
- John Melling – piano (track 10), string arrangements (track 10)
