= Rock On (Humble Pie album) =

Studio album by Humble Pie
- Released: 26 March 1971
- Recorded: Olympic Studios, London, January 1971 ("79th and Sunset" and "Strange Days", January 1970)
- Genres: Blues rock; hard rock
- Length: 38:43
- Label: A&M
- Producers: Glyn Johns & Humble Pie

Humble Pie chronology
Humble Pie (1970)	Rock On (1971)	Performance: Rockin' the Fillmore (1971)

Professional ratings
Review scores
Source	Rating
AllMusic	4/5 stars
The Rolling Stone Album Guide	2.5/5 stars

Rock On is the fourth album by the English rock group Humble Pie, released in March 1971. It reached #118 on the Billboard 200. It is the last Humble Pie studio album to feature guitarist/singer Peter Frampton, who left the band towards the end of the year.

== Background ==
Rock On saw Humble Pie establishing the heavy blues/rock sound they became famous for, led in no small part by their new manager, Dee Anthony, after the collapse of Andrew Loog Oldham's Immediate Records. It was Frampton's favourite album with Humble Pie, but he was becoming unhappy with continuing in the band. In the latter part of the year, after their live album Performance Rockin' the Fillmore was mixed, and shortly before it was released, he left the band to pursue a solo career, and take his music in a more acoustic direction.

Most of the songs on Rock On were performed live on tour before being recorded for the album. Singer and guitarist Steve Marriott turned the production into a studio party of sorts, featuring numerous guest performers from the world of blues and soul. Distinguished performers such as PP Arnold, who Marriott knew very well from his Small Faces days, Doris Troy who had a U.S. hit in the early 1960s with her own self-composed song "Just One Look" (later covered by The Hollies), and Claudia Lennear (who had sung backing for artists such as Joe Cocker, Freddie King and Gene Clark), were featured on this album.

The album features the classic rock song "Stone Cold Fever", written by all four members. Marriott's ballad "A Song For Jenny" (written for first wife Jenny Rylance) features The Soul Sisters (Doris Troy, P.P. Arnold and Claudia Lennear) on backing vocals. B.J. Cole contributes pedal steel guitar. "Strange Days" is a blues rock song in which Marriott's powerful vocals soar as close to a live performance as any on this album. The vocals have a delayed echo, sounding grounded yet "out there"; and Frampton's guitar solos weave throughout. It is also the longest song on the album. "Sour Grain" was a joint composition by Frampton and Marriott, keeping the same tempo as "Shine On", but with just Marriott on vocals. "Big George" was a Ridley composition, for which he sang the lead vocals.

== Track listing ==
1. "Shine On" (Frampton) – 3:00
2. "Sour Grain" (Frampton, Marriott) – 2:40
3. "79th and Sunset" (Marriott) – 3:01
4. "Stone Cold Fever" (Ridley, Marriott, Shirley, Frampton) – 4:09
5. "Rollin' Stone" (Muddy Waters, arranged by Humble Pie) – 6:00
6. "A Song for Jenny" (Marriott) – 2:35
7. "The Light" (Frampton) – 3:15
8. "Big George" (Ridley) – 4:08
9. "Strange Days" (music - Humble Pie; words - Marriott) – 6:36
10. "Red Neck Jump" (Marriott) – 3:06

== Personnel ==
Humble Pie

- Steve Marriott – organ (1, 7, 9), vocals (2–10), guitar (2–8, 10), harmonica (4, 5), Wurlitzer piano (6), piano (9, 10), percussion
- Peter Frampton – guitar (all tracks), vocals (1–5, 7, 8, 10), piano (3), Wurlitzer piano (7), percussion
- Greg Ridley – bass (all tracks), vocals (3–5, 7, 8, 10), percussion
- Jerry Shirley – drums (all tracks), piano (3), vocals (10), percussion

Guest musicians

- Soul Sisters:
  - P. P. Arnold, Claudia Lennear, & Doris Troy – vocals (1, 6)
- B. J. Cole – pedal steel guitar (2, 3, 6)
- Bobby Keys – saxophone (8)
- Alexis Korner – vocals (10)

Production

- Recorded and mixed by Glyn Johns at Olympic Sound Studios, London, January 1971
  - "79th and Sunset" recorded by Andrew Johns at Olympic, London, January 1970
  - "Strange Days" recorded at Island, London, January 1970
- A Glyn Johns and Humble Pie Joint Production
- John Kelly – album cover design and photography

== Charts ==
Chart (1971)	Peak position
Canada Top Albums/CDs (RPM)	87
US Billboard 200	118
