= Humble Pie =

English rock band

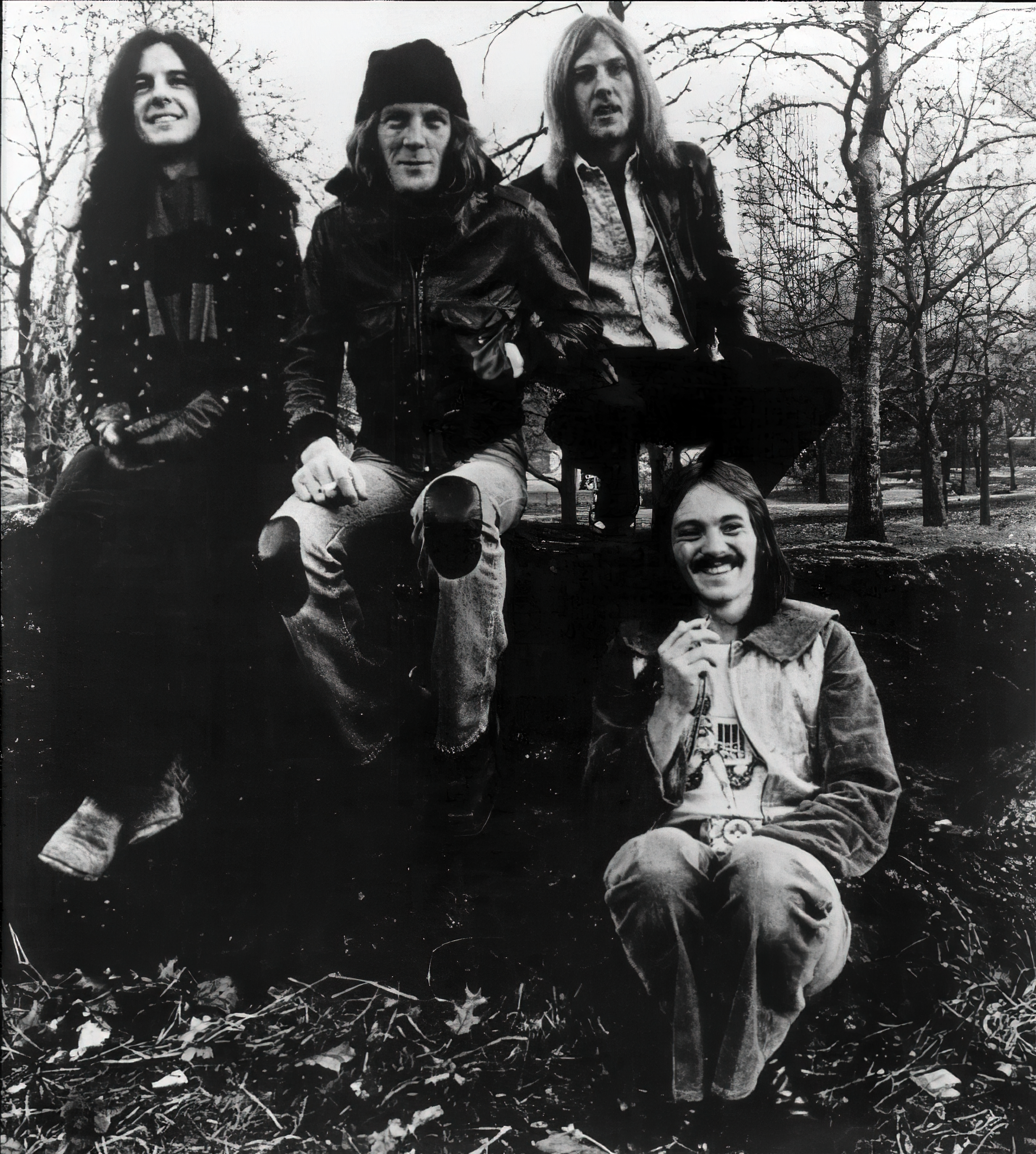
- Humble Pie in 1974. From left: Shirley, Ridley, Clempson, Marriott (bottom)

Background information
- Origin: Moreton, Essex, England
- Genres: Hard rock; blues rock; boogie rock
- Years active: 1969–1975; 1979–1983; 1988–2000; 2001–2002; 2018–present
- Labels: Immediate; A&M; Sanctuary; Atco; Cleopatra
- Spinoff of: The Herd; The Apostolic Intervention; Small Faces; Spooky Tooth
- Members: Jerry Shirley; Dave Colwell; Ivan Bodley; Bobby Marks; Jim Stapley
- Past members: See: List of Humble Pie members

Humble Pie are an English rock band formed by former Small Faces vocalist and guitarist Steve Marriott and former Herd vocalist and guitarist Peter Frampton in Moreton, Essex, in 1969. The original line-up was completed by former Spooky Tooth bassist Greg Ridley and former Apostolic Intervention drummer Jerry Shirley. They are known as one of the first supergroups of the late 1960s and enjoyed success in the early 1970s with songs such as "Black Coffee", "30 Days in the Hole", "I Don't Need No Doctor", "Hot 'n' Nasty" and "Natural Born Bugie". Frampton left the band in 1971 and was replaced by Clem Clempson.

== History ==
=== 1968: Background and formation ===
Marriott befriended Frampton during the latter months of 1968 and the pair bonded over their unwanted 'teen heart-throb' status in the UK and their shared desire to be taken more seriously as musicians. Frampton was at something of a loose end professionally, having recently left the Herd. Marriott, acting as mentor to his younger new friend, agreed to help Frampton find a new musical direction.

Marriott had initially wanted Frampton to join his established group Small Faces as a second guitarist in order to expand their musical horizons, rather than form an entirely new group with him. This proposal met with resistance from his Small Faces bandmates Ronnie Lane and Ian McLagan. Frampton guested during a few of the band's live shows in October which, although well received by audiences, seemingly did nothing to convince Marriott's reluctant bandmates to allow Frampton to join them on a permanent basis. Consequently, Marriott was soon helping Frampton to form his own band as a backup plan.

In December 1968 at the behest of their long-time recording engineer/producer Glyn Johns, the Small Faces served as a backing band for French singer Johnny Hallyday during recording sessions in Paris for his latest album, "Rivière... Ouvre Ton lit" (aka "Je Suis Né Dans La Rue"), and Marriott invited Frampton along to participate. The week-long sessions may have been another of Marriott's attempts to test the waters to expand the Small Faces line-up, but tensions were reportedly brought to a head and the seeds sown for the group's break-up in the new year. The Hallyday sessions therefore proved to be the Small Faces' final studio recordings. Embryonic versions of "Bang!" and "What You Will" from Humble Pie's debut album were recorded by the Small Faces and Frampton during the sessions, and the five musicians can be heard playing together (and also in various combinations with Hallyday's regular band) throughout the album.

For unclear reasons, Lane and McLagan continued to oppose Frampton joining the group. As a result, Marriott's efforts to put a band together from scratch for Frampton became more concerted, and Greg Ridley and Jerry Shirley were successfully auditioned. An increasingly-frustrated Marriott stormed off stage during a Small Faces live performance with Alexis Korner at the Alexandra Palace on New Year's Eve, and backstage he announced to his bandmates that he was leaving. He then approached Frampton with a view to joining him in the band he had helped to form for him.

=== 1969–1970: Official formation and UK chart success ===
After fulfilling outstanding live performance commitments, including a European tour in January, the Small Faces' dissolution was formally announced in March 1969, and Marriott and Frampton's plans to form a new group together were unveiled (although the band were already formed and had been rehearsing together since January).

Having been instantly labelled by the UK music press as a supergroup, the band chose the name Humble Pie in order to downplay such expectations and signed with Andrew Loog Oldham's record label Immediate Records. Their debut album, As Safe as Yesterday Is, was released in August 1969, along with the single, "Natural Born Bugie"/"Wrist Job", which reached No. 4 hit in the UK Singles Chart; the album peaked at No. 32 in the UK album charts. As Safe as Yesterday Is was one of the first albums to be described by the term "heavy metal" in a 1970 review in Rolling Stone magazine, though in this case, it was meant to be an insult rather than a genre label.

Their second album, Town and Country, was rush-released in the UK in November 1969 while Immediate Records were on the verge of financial collapse and the band was away on its first tour of the US. This album featured a more acoustic sound and songs written by all four members. Humble Pie concerts at this time featured an acoustic set, with a radical re-working of Graham Gouldman's "For Your Love" as its centrepiece, followed by an electric set. Recent tape archives show that the band recorded around 30 songs in its first nine months of existence, many of which remained unreleased for decades, including an interpretation of Henry Glover's "Drown in My Own Tears".

=== 1970–1971: Focus on American success ===
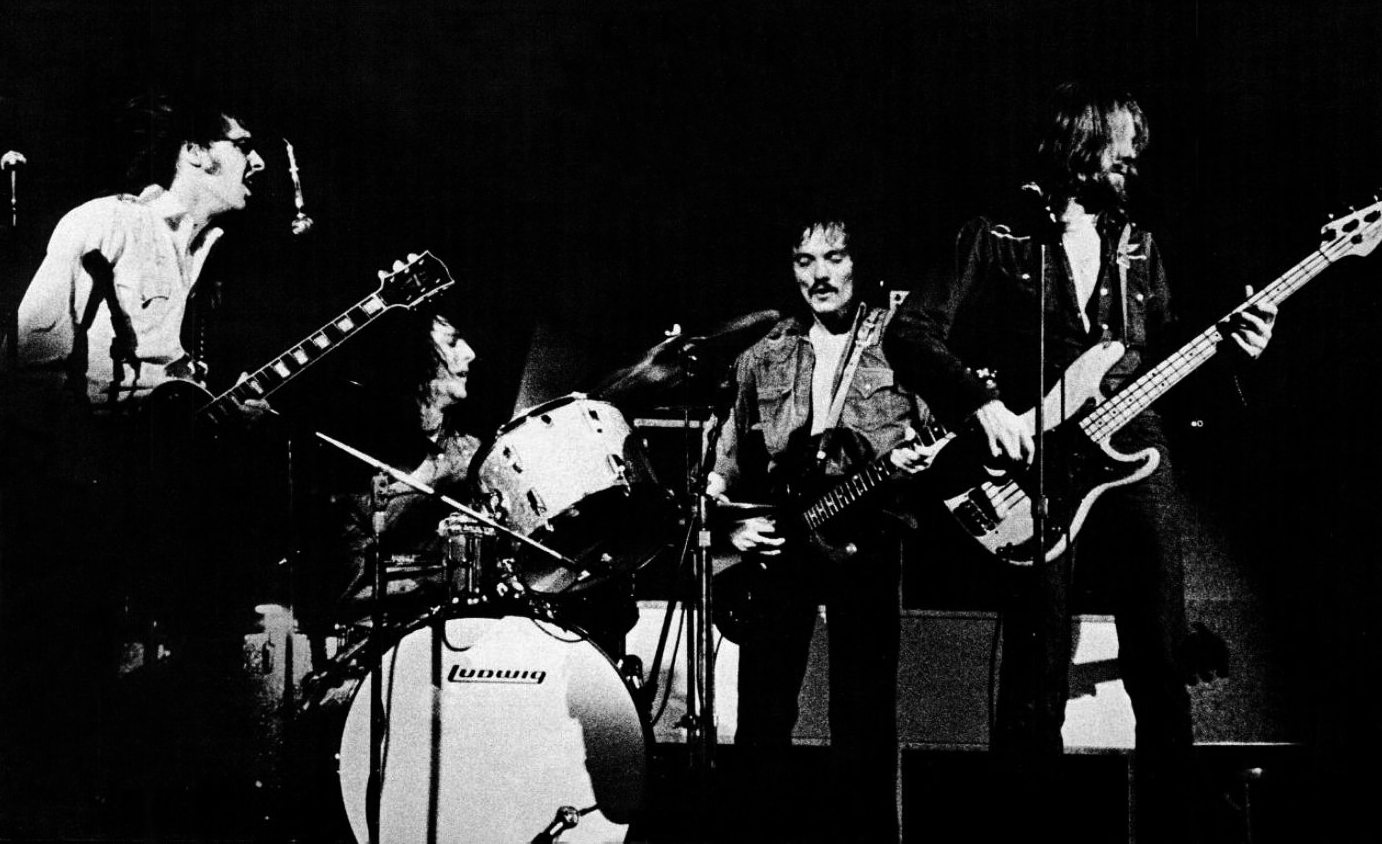
The band in 1971. From left: Frampton, Shirley, Marriott, Ridley.

During 1970, with the Immediate label having finally collapsed, Humble Pie signed to A&M Records and Dee Anthony became their manager. Anthony was focused on the US market and suggested the band discard the acoustic set and instigate a more raucous sound with Marriott as the front man. The group's first album for A&M, Humble Pie, was released later that year and alternated between progressive rock and hard rock. A single, "Big Black Dog", was released to coincide with the album and failed to chart, however the band was becoming known for popular live rock shows in the US.

It was during this period that Frampton acquired his famed "Phenix" guitar, the black 1954 Les Paul Custom that became his signature instrument and his favourite guitar for the next decade. Humble Pie was playing a run of shows at the Fillmore West in San Francisco in early December 1970 and during the first show Frampton was plagued by sound problems with his then-current guitar, a semi-acoustic Gibson 335, which was prone to unwanted feedback at higher volumes. After the show he was approached by fan and musician Mark Mariana, who loaned him the modified 1954 Gibson Les Paul, and by the end of the second show Frampton had become so enamoured of the guitar that he offered to buy it on the spot, but Mariana refused payment. Frampton played it almost exclusively for the next ten years.

Humble Pie played in a free concert at Hyde Park, London with Grand Funk Railroad & Head Hands & Feet on 3 July 1971. On 9 July 1971 Humble Pie opened for Grand Funk Railroad at their historic Shea Stadium concert, an event that broke the Beatles record for fastest selling stadium concert, to that date. Also in 1971, Humble Pie released their most successful album to date, Rock On, as well as a live album recorded at the Fillmore East in New York entitled Performance: Rockin' the Fillmore. The live album reached No. 21 on the US Billboard 200 and was certified gold by the RIAA. "I Don't Need No Doctor" became an FM radio standard in the US, peaking at No. 73 on the Billboard Hot 100 and propelling the album up the charts. By the time of the album's release, Frampton had left the band and went on to enjoy success as a solo artist.

=== 1972–1975: Clem Clempson, the Blackberries and further success ===
Frampton was replaced by Clem Clempson and Humble Pie moved toward a harder sound emphasising Marriott's blues and soul roots. Their first record with Clempson, Smokin', was released in March 1972, along with two singles "Hot 'n' Nasty" and "30 Days in the Hole" (the latter of which became one of their best-known efforts). It was the band's most commercially successful record and reached No. 6 on the US charts, helped by a busy touring schedule. After the success of Smokin', the band's record label A&M released Humble Pie's first two albums as one double album titled Lost and Found. The marketing ploy was a success and the album charted at No. 37 on the Billboard 200.

Looking for a more authentic R&B sound, Marriott hired three female backing vocalists, the Blackberries. The trio consisted of Venetta Fields, Clydie King and Sherlie Matthews, who was later replaced by Billie Barnum. They had performed with Ike and Tina Turner as The Ikettes and with Ray Charles as The Raelettes. This new line-up included Sidney George on saxophone for the recording of Eat It, a double album released in April 1973 made up of Marriott originals (some acoustic), R&B numbers, and a Humble Pie concert recorded in Glasgow. The album peaked at No. 13 in the US charts. Album number seven, Thunderbox, was released in February 1974 and Street Rats a year later.

Street Rats (February 1975) was created at the same time as Marriott was producing a solo album and a collaboration album with Greg Ridley. After the release of this album and their 1975 "Goodbye Pie Tour", Humble Pie disbanded, citing musical differences. Marriott went on to produce his first solo album Marriott and moved back to the UK.

=== 1979–1981: Steve Marriott's Humble Pie without Frampton and Ridley ===
In late 1979, Marriott and Shirley, now managed by Leber-Krebs, revived Humble Pie, adding Bobby Tench, former vocalist and guitarist from The Jeff Beck Group, along with bassist Anthony "Sooty" Jones from New York. They submitted "Fool for a Pretty Face", a song Marriott and Shirley had just written, to record labels. They secured a recording contract with Atlantic Records subsidiary Atco and in the UK their material was released by Jet Records, owned by former Small Faces manager Don Arden. They recorded the album On to Victory (April 1980) and "Fool for a Pretty Face" reached No. 52 on the US Billboard Hot 100. On to Victory peaked at No. 60 on the Billboard 200.

Humble Pie toured the US in 1980 as part of the 'Rock 'N' Roll Marathon Bill' with Frank Marino & Mahogany Rush, Angelz & Mother's Finest (though some gigs - such as Alpine Valley - had Kansas City, Missouri in place of Mother's Finest). Humble Pie toured with Ted Nugent & Aerosmith in 1981 and also recorded the album Go for the Throat (June 1981). This album was originally recorded by the band as a raw-edged Rhythm and Blues album, but their record company wanted a slicker album.

In April 1981, at the beginning of the promotional tour for the Go for the Throat album, Marriott crushed his hand in a hotel room door, delaying earlier scheduled appearances by the band, and he later developed a duodenal ulcer forcing the cancellation of all further tour dates in late July 1981. Soon afterwards this line-up disbanded due to the loss of the Atlantic contract and the ceasing of financial support from Leber-Krebs. And to make matters even worse, the band's equipment truck was stolen.

=== 1982: Marriott forms a new band billed as Humble Pie ===
In 1982 Marriott was back on the road with Jim Leverton (bass, backing vocals), former Steppenwolf keyboardist Goldy McJohn and Chicago-born drummer Fallon Williams III. This grouping was originally set to be called The Official Receivers, The Three Trojans (after McJohn departed) or The Pie, but ended up billed by promoters as Humble Pie. McJohn was let go after suffering drug troubles and the remaining trio toured Australia in October 1982 billed as Small Faces to entice patrons. In January 1983 Leverton ran into trouble at U.S. Immigration and was deported back to England.

Marriott based himself in the Atlanta, Georgia, area, where his second wife Pamela Stephens was from, and continued to tour clubs as Humble Pie. Atlanta musician Keith Christopher (from The Brains) took over bass and a young guitarist from Tennessee, Tommy Johnson, joined as well. After a deal with Capricorn Records fell through due to the label ceasing to trade, this line-up went into Pyramid Eye Studios in Chattanooga, Tennessee, to record three songs intended for an album which didn't materialize.

Following Johnson leaving and being replaced by Phil Dix, they were scheduled to record demos with Yes and ELP producer Eddy Offord at Eddy's studio in Atlanta with Rick Richards of Georgia Satellites as the new guitarist. But before recording sessions began, Rick and Keith were fired from the band by Marriott for showing up late to one of the sessions. The recordings were finished with Fallon on drums and Dave Hewitt (from Babe Ruth) on bass, but failed to attract a record label.

On 4 September 1983 Humble Pie performed at the Electric Cowboy Festival in Columbia, Tennessee, where Marriott was carried onstage by a roadie due to a very large cast on his leg. They appeared as a last-minute replacement for the English group Madness. After this there were some more US club dates, which were Marriott's last official live performances under the name Humble Pie. He then disbanded the group and returned to England in late 1983.

=== 1988–2000: Jerry Shirley's Humble Pie, new Marriott and Frampton songs ===
Jerry Shirley obtained the rights to the name Humble Pie in 1988 and reformed the group with different musicians. This project was called New Humble Pie or Humble Pie featuring Jerry Shirley, where Shirley was the only original member. The band began performing concerts and was based in Cleveland, Ohio, where Shirley was working as an on-air radio personality at Cleveland's WNCX. The line-up included vocalist Charlie Huhn, who also played lead and rhythm guitar. While Huhn and Shirley were the only permanent members of the group, several other musicians appeared, including Wally Stocker and a returning Anthony "Sooty" Jones on bass. Jones was quickly replaced by Sean Beavan (who was engineering their 1989 independent single release "Still Rockin'").

In August 1989 they appeared in the line-up at the Woodstock Festival's 20th Anniversary Celebration. By 1990, Scott Allen had replaced Beavan on bass and a little later that year, Cleveland guitarist Alan Greene had joined in place of Stocker. Bassist Sam Nemon played with this line-up from 1992 to 1996, when Brad Johnson took over. In August 1999 Shirley was seriously injured in an auto accident and later returned to England.

Frampton and Marriott started collaborating again in 1990. Two songs from this collaboration, "The Bigger They Come" and "I Won't Let You Down", with Marriott's vocals, appeared on Frampton's album Shine On: A Collection. Marriott died in a house fire on 20 April 1991.

=== 2000–2003: Former members reform, Back on Track album and Steve Marriott Memorial concert ===
In 2000 Charlie Huhn continued on as Humble Pie without Shirley to fulfill live dates. Rick Craig of Halloween joined the line up with bassist Kent "Bubba" Gascoyne and Jamie Darnell on drums. Michigan guitarist Patrick Thomas took Craig's place later that year and Ian Evans (from The Outlaws) replaced Gascoyne. After completing touring duties they disbanded and Huhn went on to join Foghat.

Having returned to the UK, Shirley re-formed Humble Pie in 2001 with a line-up including the original bassist Greg Ridley, former Humble Pie member vocalist and guitarist Bobby Tench and new rhythm guitarist Dave Colwell (of Bad Company). They recorded Humble Pie's thirteenth studio album, Back on Track (2002), which comprised new songs and was released by Sanctuary Records. Keyboard players Zoot Money and Victor Martin were brought in for recording sessions. A brief tour of UK and Germany with Company of Snakes followed with new keyboardist Dean Rees and guitarist Johnny Warman. But Ridley fell ill late in 2002 and the band split up.

Shirley appeared at the Steve Marriott Tribute Concert held at the London Astoria in 2001, to commemorate the 10th anniversary of Marriott's death. The concert featured a grouping of early Humble Pie members Frampton, Clempson, Ridley and Shirley. Former member guitarist Bobby Tench also appeared as the frontman for the house band, which included Zak Starkey, keyboard player Rabbit Bundrick and bassist Rick Wills. This concert was released as a DVD by Chrome Dreams in 2005 entitled The Steve Marriott Astoria Memorial Concert 2001, and as an album with the title One More for the Ol' Tosser (2006).

In May 2003 Ridley had recovered enough to undertake two gigs, one at a club in Bucharest, Romania, with a group he called Greg Ridley's Humble Pie that included Ridley, Rees, Chris George (guitar), Stefan John (guitar) and Karl Randall (drums). He died later that year, on 19 November 2003, in Alicante, Spain of pneumonia and resulting complications. He was 62.

=== 2018 reunion and beyond ===
During 2018 Jerry Shirley still owned the Humble Pie name and instigated a new line-up which he would direct but not tour with. Shirley stated: "We all have a great sense of love and pride for Humble Pie, the [former] members their families and what we were able to achieve and it goes without saying that no one will ever replace Steve, Peter or any member of the band. My goal is keep the legacy of Humble Pie intact as one of the greatest live acts in rock, while satiating the need for generations of our beloved fans to again enjoy our music performed live by world class musicians."

Shirley chose Dave Colwell, who had played and recorded with the band on the 2002 album Back on Track as a front man and lead guitarist, alongside former Savoy Brown and Cactus singer Jimmy Kunes. The new line-up included second guitarist James "Roto" Rotondi, bassist David C. Gross (replaced later in 2018 by Ivan "Funkboy" Bodley) and drummer Bobby Marks. They began a fifteen-show tour of the US on 31 August 2018 in Riverhead, New York. The band performed songs from the Humble Pie catalogue and other songs such as Bad Company's "Can't Get Enough (of your Love)" and Free's "All Right Now".

In 2023 Shirley's "Humble Pie Legacy" line-up of Dave Colwell (guitar), Jim Stapley (vocals, guitar, Hammond, harmonica), Ivan Bodley (bass) and Bobby Marks (drums) continued.

== Personnel ==
Current members

- Jerry Shirley – drums, percussion (1969–1975, 1979–1981, 1988–1999, 2001–2002, 2018–present)
- Dave "Bucket" Colwell – guitars, backing vocals (2001–2002, 2018–present)
- Ivan "Funkboy" Bodley – bass (2018–present)
- Bobby Marks – drums, percussion (2018–present)
- Jim Stapley – vocals, guitars, keyboards (2022–present)

Former members

- Steve Marriott – vocals, guitars, keyboards, harmonica (1969–1975, 1979–1983; died 1991)
- Greg Ridley – bass, vocals, guitars (1969–1975, 2001–2002; died 2003)
- Peter Frampton – guitars, vocals, keyboards (1969–1971)
- Clem Clempson – guitars, vocals, keyboards (1971–1975)

== Discography ==
=== Studio albums ===
Year	Album	UK	US	CAN	AUS	GER	NLD	Certification	Label
1969	As Safe as Yesterday Is	32	–	–	–	–	6		Immediate
1969	Town and Country	–	–	–	–	–	–		Immediate
1970	Humble Pie	–	–	–	–	–	–		A&M
1971	Rock On	–	118	87	–	–	–		A&M
1972	Smokin'	20	6	13	9	26	–	US: Gold	A&M
1973	Eat It	34	13	10	41	–	–		A&M
1974	Thunderbox	–	52	58	–	–	–		A&M
1975	Street Rats	–	100	98	–	–	–		A&M
1980	On to Victory	–	60	89	–	–	–		Atco
1981	Go for the Throat	–	154	–	–	–	–		Atco
2002	Back on Track	–	–	–	–	–	–		Sanctuary

=== Live albums ===
Year	Album	UK	US	CAN	AUS	GER	Certification
1971	Performance: Rockin' the Fillmore	32	21	17	20	40	US: Gold
1996	King Biscuit Flower Hour Presents – Humble Pie In Concert	–	–	–	–	–	
2000	Extended Versions (Reissue of the 1996 King Biscuit Flower Hour Presents 'In Concert' )	–	–	–	–	–	
2000	Natural Born Boogie: The BBC Sessions	–	–	–	–	–	
2002	Live at the Whisky A Go-Go '69	–	–	–	–	–	
2010	Hot 'n' Nasty: Rockin' the Winterland (Reissue of the 1996 King Biscuit Flower Hour Presents 'In Concert' )	–	–	–	–	–	
2012	Live '73 (Reissue of the 1996 King Biscuit Flower Hour Presents 'In Concert' )	–	–	–	–	–	
2013	Live '81	–	–	–	–	–	
2013	Performance: Rockin' the Fillmore: The Complete Recordings Box set (4-CD)	–	–	–	–	89	
2017	Official Bootleg Box Set, Volume 1 Box set (3-CD)	–	–	–	–	–	
2018	Official Bootleg Box Set, Volume 2 Box set (5-CD)	–	–	–	–	–	
2019	Up Our Sleeve – Official Bootleg Box Set, Vol. 3 Box set (5-CD)	–	–	–	–	–	
2019	Tourin' – The Official Bootleg Box Set, Volume 4 Box set (4-CD)	–	–	–	–	–	
2025	Hallelujah: 1973-1983 Box Set (5-CD) (includes 3 live discs, plus reissues of On To Victory and Go For The Throat)	–	–	–	–	–	

=== Compilations ===
- Lost and Found (1973) (US Cash Box – 41)
- Back Home Again (1976)
- Greatest Hits (1977)
- The Best (1982)
- A&M Classics, Volume 14 (1987)
- A Piece of the Pie (1993)
- Hot 'N' Nasty: The Anthology (1994)
- Early Years (1994)
- The Scrubbers Sessions (1997)
- Running with the Pack (1999)
- Natural Born Bugie: The Immediate Anthology (2000)
- The Best of Humble Pie: 20th Century Masters/The Millennium Collection (2000)
- The Atlanta Years (2005)
- The Definitive Collection (2006)
- The A&M Vinyl Box Set (2017)
- The A&M CD Box Set (2022)
- I Need a Star in My Life (2022) reissue of The Scrubbers Sessions

=== Singles ===
Year	Single	Chart Positions			
Year	Single	UK	US	CAN	AUS
1969	"Natural Born Bugie"	4	–	–	19
1969	"The Sad Bag of Shaky Jake"	–	–	–	–
1970	"Big Black Dog"	–	–	–	–
1971	"Shine On"	–	–	–	–
1971	"I Don't Need No Doctor"	–	73	72	–
1972	"Hot 'n' Nasty"	–	52	35	–
1972	"30 Days in the Hole"	–	–	–	–
1973	"Black Coffee"	–	113	–	–
1973	"Get Down to It"	–	–	–	–
1973	"Shut Up and Don't Interrupt Me"	–	–	–	–
1974	"Ninety-Nine Pounds"	–	–	–	–
1974	"Oh la de Da"	–	–	–	–
1975	"Rock and Roll Music"	–	105	–	–
1980	"Fool for a Pretty Face"	–	52	–	–
1981	"Tin Soldier"	–	58	–	–

=== Videos and DVDs ===
- The Steve Marriott Astoria Memorial Concert 2001 (2005) Chrome Dreams
