= Town and Country (album) =

Studio album by Humble Pie
- Released: November 1969
- Recorded: 1969
- Studio: Olympic Studios, London, England
- Genre: Folk rock; blues rock
- Length: 37:51
- Label: Immediate
- Producer: Andy Johns

Humble Pie chronology
As Safe As Yesterday Is (1969)	Town and Country (1969)	Humble Pie (1970)

Professional ratings
Review scores
Source	Rating
AllMusic	4/5 stars

Town and Country is the second studio album by rock band Humble Pie, released in November 1969. It was released only in the UK.

== Background ==
The album was conceived at band member Steve Marriott's 16th-century rural cottage "Arkesden" in Moreton, Essex, England. Most, if not all, of the material dated back to recordings in the spring and early summer of 1969, when the band recorded as much as three albums' worth of material (the remaining recordings were eventually compiled and released in 1999 on the bands' The Immediate Years: Natural Born Boogie collection).

== Production and composition ==
Town and Country offered a more pastoral approach than the more straightforward "heavy" progressive sound prevalent on their debut album, which had been released two months earlier. Like the band's early live shows, which opened with an acoustic set before returning with electric guitars in the second half of the show, Town and Country displayed a mix of acoustic ballads, country-rock, folk, blues, and hard rock.

Unlike the debut LP, all four members of the band contributed solo compositions to this album. Among the Marriott-composed tracks were his country-rock compositions "Every Mother's Son", "The Sad Bag Of Shakey Jake" and "Down Home Again". Peter Frampton's compositions "Take Me Back", "Only You Can See" and "Home and Away" (a nominal co-write with Marriott and Ridley) nod toward the direction he would take in his later solo career. The album also included a cover of the Buddy Holly song "Heartbeat".

Frampton played acoustic, Spanish, and lead guitars, and Marriott played guitar, sitar, percussion and keyboards, and bass guitar. Bassist Greg Ridley contributed guitar and tambourine, while Jerry Shirley handled his drum kit, a percussion saw on the first track, as well as tambourine, tablas, maracas, and Wurlitzer piano on his own composition "Cold Lady".

== Release ==
While the band toured for the last half of the year to hone their onstage skills and generate interest with the record-buying public, their record label Immediate Records was on the verge of financial collapse. Immediate Records rush-released the album into UK record shops in November 1969, hoping it would enter the charts before the company went bankrupt. With no budget to promote it, the album quickly sank without a trace. The LP was not released at all in the US at the time, even though the band was currently on their first American tour, but it still managed to garner favorable attention on underground FM radio stations. As a result, the album bolstered the group's reputation, despite its lack of availability, the record company's imminent collapse, and disappointing sales.

After this album, Humble Pie returned to what would become their trademark "heavy" sound, and concentrated their efforts on breaking into the US market. Following Frampton's departure in 1971, the band would continue in the boogie rock vein until the remaining and replacement members disbanded in 1975.

== Track listing ==
1. "Take Me Back" – (Frampton) – 4:52
2. "The Sad Bag of Shaky Jake" – (Marriott) – 2:59 (spelled as 'Shakey’ on some issues)
3. "The Light of Love" – (Ridley) – 3:00
4. "Cold Lady" – (Shirley) – 3:22
5. "Down Home Again" – (Marriott) – 2:56
6. "Ollie Ollie" – (Frampton, Marriott, Ridley, Shirley, Andy Johns) – 0:50
7. "Every Mother's Son" – (Marriott) – 5:43
8. "Heartbeat" – (Bob Montgomery, Norman Petty) – 2:33
9. "Only You Can See" – (Frampton) – 3:38
10. "Silver Tongue" – (Marriott) – 3:20
11. "Home and Away" – (Marriott, Frampton, Ridley) – 5:55
12. "79th Street Blues" (Humble Pie) – 3:00 (bonus track for CD release)
13. "Greg's Song" (Ridley) – 4:29 (bonus track for CD release)

== Personnel ==
Humble Pie

- Steve Marriott – guitar (2, 4, 7, 8), Leslie guitar (10), sitar (3), vocals (2, 4, 5, 7–10), organ (11), Wurlitzer piano (2, 11), percussion (1), hammer and nail brandy bottle (1), maracas (2), drums (9), harmonica (2)
- Peter Frampton – vocals (1–5, 8, 9, 11), guitar (1, 5, 9, 11), lead guitar (2, 7, 8, 10), Spanish guitar (3), bass (3), drums (4), Wurlitzer piano (9), plastic-cup (1)
- Greg Ridley – bass (1, 2, 4, 5, 8–11), guitar (3), vocals (2–5, 8, 11), tambourine (1)
- Jerry Shirley – drums (2, 5, 8, 10, 11), saw (1), tambourine (2), tablas (3), maracas (4), Wurlitzer piano (4)

Technical team

- Engineers: Andrew Johns, Rob, John, Happy Keith
- Arranged by Humble Pie
