= Natural Born Bugie =

Single by Humble Pie
- B-side: "Wrist Job"
- Released: 15 August 1969
- Recorded: 1969, London
- Genre: Blues rock
- Label: Immediate
- Songwriter: Steve Marriott
- Producer: Humble Pie

Humble Pie singles chronology
"Natural Born Bugie" (1969)	"The Sad Bag of Shaky Jake" (1969)

"Natural Born Bugie" is the debut single released in 1969 by English rock band Humble Pie, who were one of the first British supergroups. It was written as a mid tempo rock song by Steve Marriott, for Andrew Loog Oldham's Immediate label and became the band's first single release. The original UK B-side was "Wrist Job" and it was replaced with "I'll Go Alone" for a later release in United States. The three guitarists sang a stanza each.

The song reached No. 4 on the UK Singles Chart during 1969. The song's refrain refers to a "Natural Born Woman".

== Personnel ==
=== "Natural Born Bugie" ===
- Steve Marriott - vocals, rhythm guitar, Wurlitzer electric piano
- Peter Frampton - vocals, lead guitar
- Greg Ridley - vocals, bass guitar
- Jerry Shirley - drums

=== "Wrist Job" ===
- Steve Marriott - lead and backing vocals, Wurlitzer electric piano
- Peter Frampton - backing vocals, Hammond organ
- Greg Ridley - backing vocals, bass guitar
- Jerry Shirley - drums

== Charts ==
Chart (1969)	Peak position
Austria (Ö3 Austria Top 40)	13
Belgium (Ultratop 50 Flanders)	9
France (IFOP)	97
Ireland (IRMA)	6
Netherlands (Single Top 100)	6
UK Singles (OCC)	4
West Germany (GfK)	20
