= I Don't Need No Doctor =

1966 single by Ray Charles

- Dutch release picture sleeve

Single by Ray Charles
- B-side: "Please Say You're Fooling"
- Released: 1966
- Recorded: 1966
- Genre: R&B
- Label: ABC
- Songwriters: Jo Armstead, Nick Ashford, Valerie Simpson

Ray Charles singles chronology
"Let's Go Get Stoned" (1966)	"I Don't Need No Doctor" (1966)	"Please Say You're Fooling" (1966)

"I Don't Need No Doctor"

Single by Humble Pie

from the album Performance Rockin' the Fillmore
- B-side: "A Song for Jenny"
- Released: 10 September 1971
- Genre: Hard rock
- Length: 9:15 (album); 3:45 (single)
- Label: A&M
- Songwriters: Jo Armstead, Nick Ashford, Valerie Simpson

Humble Pie singles chronology
"Shine On" (1971)	"I Don't Need No Doctor" (1971)	"Hot 'n' Nasty" (1972)

"I Don't Need No Doctor" is an R&B song written by Nick Ashford, Valerie Simpson, and Jo Armstead. First released by Ashford on Verve in August 1966, it went nowhere. It was then picked up and recorded by Ray Charles and released in October 1966. Over the years, it has been covered by bands such as garage rock band The Chocolate Watchband in 1969, Humble Pie in 1971, New Riders of the Purple Sage in 1972, metal band W.A.S.P. in 1986, rock band Great White in 1987, garage punk band The Nomads in 1989 and Styx as part of a live album in 2006. Humble Pie's version reached No. 73 on the Billboard Hot 100 singles chart and No. 72 in Canada.

Jazz guitarist John Scofield recorded a version for his album That's What I Say: John Scofield Plays the Music of Ray Charles in 2005, featuring John Mayer on additional guitar and vocals. Mayer covered the song again with his band during his tour in summer 2007. A version recorded live during a Los Angeles show during that tour is available on Mayer's CD/DVD release Where the Light Is. A Ray Charles tribute album also provided the impetus for jazz singer Roseanna Vitro's version – specifically, her 1997 CD, Catchin’ Some Rays: The Music of Ray Charles.

== See also ==
- Ray Charles discography
