= Performance: Rockin' the Fillmore =

Live album by Humble Pie
- Released: November 1971
- Recorded: May 28–29, 1971
- Venues: Fillmore East, New York City
- Genres: Hard rock; blues rock; boogie rock; heavy metal
- Length: 72:39
- Label: A&M
- Producer: Humble Pie

Humble Pie chronology
Rock On (1971)	Performance: Rockin' the Fillmore (1971)	Smokin' (1972)

Performance: Rockin' the Fillmore is the 1971 live double-LP/single-CD by the English blues-rock group Humble Pie, recorded at the Fillmore East in New York City on May 28–29, 1971. It reached No. 21 on the Billboard 200, #32 in Canada, and entered the UK Top 40.

== Background ==
The hour-long set contains one original song and several cover versions. The song listed as "Four Day Creep" is attributed to the classic blues singer Ida Cox, but bears no melodic or lyrical resemblance to her self-recorded composition of that title. The single version of "I Don't Need No Doctor" was backed with "A Song for Jenny" from the Rock On album, which Marriott wrote for his first wife, Jenny Rylance.

After the album was mixed, and shortly before it was released, guitarist Peter Frampton left the band because of growing friction between him and Marriott.

The album's steady sales helped it to become the band's first RIAA gold record. Its popularity helped the band's previous album, Rock On, reach gold album status. "I Don't Need No Doctor" was the biggest hit from the album, having been issued as an edited single and reaching No. 73 on the Billboard Hot 100 in October 1971.

On October 29, 2013, Omnivore Recordings released all four sets recorded that weekend as a four-CD set Performance: Rockin' the Fillmore: The Complete Recordings.

== Critical reception ==
Professional ratings
Review scores
Source	Rating
AllMusic	3/5 stars
Billboard	(positive)
Christgau's Record Guide	C−
The Great Rock Discography	7/10
The Rolling Stone Album Guide	1/5 stars
The Virgin Encyclopedia of Heavy Rockf	3/5 stars

Ken Barnes penned a negative review of Performance in Fusion, writing: "In a financially justified but slightly crass bid to attract the reds-whites-and-blues crowd, the group has gone metal-heavy with a vengeance, and as a result now rocks not only the Fillmore but is rockin' the bottom as well. In short, this leaden collection of sledge-hammered Blues and over-extended, under-inspired improvisations is pretty dismal." Billboard reviewed the album more favourably, commenting that it is "full of the dynamic, raw-gut force of the hardest kind of hard rock", particularly praising "Hallelujah (I Love Her So)". Writing in Christgau's Record Guide (1981), Robert Christgau quipped: "Lotsa getdown vocals, lotsa getdown guitar, and an important political message, which is that short guys get laid more than normal people. A lie."

Paul Morris of The Rough Guide to Rock (1999) named it a "ground-breaking live double LP" which captured Humble Pie's quintessential sound, adding: "On this, Marriott, the consummate showman, employed his gutsy baritone to spine-chilling effect on lengthy and thrilling reworkings of both originals and Blues standards." He also named it one of Humble Pie's most recommended recordings, and "one of rock's most powerful live albums." Reviewing the album in The Great Rock Discography (2006), Martin C. Strong commented on Marriot's powerful stage presence, noting how he "[blazes] his way through a fiery set of boogie-based Blues-rock, both Humble Pie originals and frenetic covers".

In 2011, Houston Press ranked the album fifth in their list of "Five Essential Boogie-Rock Albums"; contributor Bob Ruggiero considers it "often overlooked but essential", adding that the lengthy jams on "Stole Cold Fever", "Rollin' Stone" and "I Don't Need No Doctor" make the record ideal for "groovin' or stuffing some choice smoke in a bowl." AllMusic's Stephen Thomas Erlewine noted how it documents an era where Marriot's concepts and lyrics were balanced by Frampton's "searing" guitar work, conceding that while less engaging than As Safe Yesterday Is, the live record is "valuable and at times insightful" for capturing the band at a pivotal moment in their career.

== Track listing ==
Side one
No.	Title	Writer(s)	Length
1.	"Four Day Creep"	Ida Cox	3:46
2.	"I'm Ready" (from Humble Pie)	music: Peter Frampton, Steve Marriott, Greg Ridley, Jerry Shirley; words: Willie Dixon	8:31
3.	"Stone Cold Fever" (from Rock On)	Peter Frampton, Steve Marriott, Greg Ridley, Jerry Shirley	6:18

Side two
No.	Title	Writer(s)	Length
4.	"I Walk on Gilded Splinters"	Dr John Creaux	23:25

Side three
No.	Title	Writer(s)	Length
5.	"Rollin' Stone" (from Rock On)	Muddy Waters; arranged by Peter Frampton, Steve Marriott, Greg Ridley, Jerry Shirley	16:07

Side four
No.	Title	Writer(s)	Length
6.	"Hallelujah I Love Her So"	Ray Charles	5:10
7.	"I Don't Need No Doctor"	Nick Ashford, Valerie Simpson, Jo Armstead	9:15

== Personnel ==
Humble Pie

- Steve Marriott – guitar, vocals, harmonica
- Peter Frampton – guitar, vocals
- Greg Ridley – bass guitar, vocals
- Jerry Shirley – drums

Technical team

- Live recording by Fedco Audio Labs
- Engineer: Eddie Kramer
- Assistant engineer: David Palmer
- Re-mixed at Electric Lady Studios, New York
- Engineer: Eddie Kramer
- Ably assisted by John Jansen, Andy Edlen, Buzzy and Tom
- Produced by The Pie

== Charts ==
Chart (1971–1972)	Peak position
Australian Albums (Kent Music Report)	20
Canada Top Albums/CDs (RPM)	17
German Albums (Offizielle Top 100)	40
UK Albums (Official Charts)	32
US Billboard 200	21

== Certifications ==
Region	Certification	Certified units/sales
United States (RIAA)	Gold	500,000^{^}
^{^} Shipments figures based on certification alone.

== Releases ==
1971 LP A&M 3506
1990 LP A&M 6008
1990 CD A&M 75021-6008-2
1990 CS A&M 75021-6008-4
1996 CD Universal/Polygram 1887
2004 LP Classic 3506
2006 CD Universal 6229
2007 CD Universal 93221
2007 CD Universal 93221 (Japan)
2013 CD Universal 3751304
2017 LP Box Disc 3 A&M ('The A&M Vinyl Boxset 1970-1975' released June 16, 2017)
