= Dee Anthony =

- Birth name: Anthony D'Addario
- Born: April 9, 1926
- Died: October 25, 2009 (aged 83)
- Genres: Rock music
- Occupation: Music manager
- Years active: 1954–1995
- Formerly of: Tony Bennett, Humble Pie, Peter Frampton, King Crimson, Emerson, Lake & Palmer

Dee Anthony (April 9, 1926 – October 25, 2009) was an American talent manager who started in the business with fellow Bronx native Jerry Vale. After meeting Tony Bennett in 1954 at a nightclub in Yonkers, New York, he ended up representing the singer for more than a decade. From the 1960s to the mid-1990s, Anthony managed a number of music artists, including Humble Pie, Traffic, Jethro Tull, Joe Cocker, Gary Wright, King Crimson, Emerson, Lake & Palmer. Montrose, Devo and Armageddon, with his most notable client being Peter Frampton.

He was born on April 9, 1926, and grew up in the Bronx as Anthony D'Addario, changing his name in the late 1950s. During World War II, he served in the United States Navy in the submarine service. After completing his military service, he started booking events for his friend Jerry Vale, ultimately becoming the road manager for crooner Tony Bennett. He started Bandana Enterprises with his brother in 1968, which managed artists such as Joe Cocker, Ten Years After and the J. Geils Band.

The English band Humble Pie had brought Anthony on in 1969 to help them gain entry into the American music scene, hoping to build on Anthony's success with helping other British groups including Spooky Tooth and Traffic, reach into the U.S. record market. Anthony had the band tour extensively around the United States, and Humble Pie produced the moderately successful live album Performance Rockin' the Fillmore in 1971 which helped them gain recognition with American record purchasers.

Marriott always believed Dee Anthony had siphoned off band earnings to promote his new project, Frampton and his album Frampton Comes Alive!. After Marriott's death, second wife Pam Stephens claimed in an interview that while they were making the Marriott solo album they were warned off accusing Anthony of any financial misdealings and received threatening phone calls. Anthony was alleged to have links with the Genovese crime family (among others). Stephens also claimed that after Marriott confronted Anthony about the missing money, she and Marriott were summoned to a meeting at the Ravenite Social Club on Mulberry Street in New York's Little Italy district. Among those present were John Gotti, Frank LoCascio and Paul Castellano, all members of the Gambino crime family. Marriott was informed that he would not be getting any money and was warned to drop the matter. He took the threats seriously. Humble Pie drummer Jerry Shirley has denied some of the Mafia rumors about Anthony and dismisses them as "bollocks" and a "romanticised exaggeration".

Frampton remained with Anthony as his manager after he left Humble Pie to perform on his own, and Anthony had Frampton follow the same model of extensive touring that they had used previously. The resulting 1976 album, Frampton Comes Alive!, became one of the best-selling live albums ever in the United States and established Frampton's status in the American hard rock scene. His subsequent albums, such as I'm in You in 1977, never attained the heights of his original live album. Anthony arranged for the casting of Frampton in the 1978 film Sgt. Pepper's Lonely Hearts Club Band, which failed both commercially and critically, with Janet Maslin of The New York Times deriding the movie as "a business deal set to music." Anthony had claimed that Paul McCartney was going to be in the film, which turned out to be totally untrue. Frampton terminated his relationship with Anthony shortly after the box-office failure of the movie.

From the 1980s until his retirement in the mid-1990s, Anthony represented acts such as Peter Allen, Basia and Devo. He had a small role in the 1982 Jamaican film "Countryman."

Fred Goodman recorded Anthony's three rules of success in his 1997 book Mansion on the Hill: "1) Get the money. 2) Remember to get the money; and, 3) Don't forget to always remember to get the money."

The Southport, Connecticut, resident died at age 83 on October 25, 2009, at Norwalk Hospital of pneumonia. He was survived by his second wife, Valerie Anthony, as well as by four daughters and six grandchildren. An earlier marriage ended in divorce. Anthony's daughter, Michele Anthony, is the executive vice president of the Universal Music Group. She was formerly the president and chief operating officer of Sony Music.
