= Immediate Records =

- Founded: 1965; 61 years ago
- Founder: Andrew Loog Oldham
- Defunct: 1970
- Status: Inactive
- Genre: Various
- Country of origin: United Kingdom
- Location: London, United Kingdom
- Official website: www.immediate-records.com

Immediate Records was a British record label, started in 1965 by The Rolling Stones' manager Andrew Loog Oldham and Tony Calder, and concentrating on the London-based blues and R&B scene.

== History ==
Immediate Records was started in 1965. Signed musicians included Rod Stewart, P.P. Arnold, songwriter Paul Korda, Billy Nicholls, John Mayall, Savoy Brown, Small Faces, The Nice, Fleetwood Mac, The Groundhogs, Chris Farlowe, Duncan Browne and Humble Pie.

Due to financial problems, the label ceased operations in 1970, and it has been the subject of controversy ever since. This is especially true in regard to unpaid royalties owed to the Small Faces, who made numerous hit recordings for the label between 1967 and 1969. Despite their success, the band received virtually no income from these often re-released records, until legal action finally secured payments from the present licencees in the early 2000s.

According to Small Faces drummer Kenney Jones, most of Immediate Records' assets and income were embezzled by one of the company's senior partners, who allegedly channelled the funds to offshore bank accounts. Paul Korda, who wrote songs such as "The Time Has Come" for P.P. Arnold, was never paid for work done for Immediate Records.

In the US, Immediate Records first set up a deal with MGM Records, who issued three singles (K-13530, K-13567, K-13600) as part of the regular MGM series using regular MGM labels with the Immediate logo on the side of the label. Then Immediate Records set up a short-lived deal with United Artists, who issued two singles using the Immediate moniker (E-1901, E-1902) before signing a deal with CBS to set up a new label series, which picked selective Immediate Records singles (using product codes with the ZS7 prefix) and albums (using Z12) until they had a dispute. Finally, Immediate Records set up a short-lived independent label in the US to issue one single (IMOC-001), Humble Pie’s first album, and The Nice's last album before the label entered into liquidation.

In 2008, a comprehensive book about Immediate Records, written by Simon Spence, who 'ghosted' Andrew Loog Oldham's two autobiographies, was published in the UK and US by Black Dog as part of their Labels Unlimited series. A second, amended version has since been published. In 2016, a comprehensive discography with brief organisational history, The Immediate Discography: The First 20 Years by recorded music historian, Mark Jones, was published with input from Barry Green, the curator of the official Immediate archive. This book won the Association for Recorded Sound Collections, Best Research in Recorded Rock Music, Best Discography Award, 2017.

Today, Sanctuary Records, owned by BMG Rights Management, controls the Immediate Records catalogue in the United Kingdom. Outside of the UK, Charly Records controls the Immediate catalogue. Charly owns the Immediate Records trade mark.

== Discography ==
=== Albums ===
| UK # | US # | Artist(s) | Album title |
|---|---|---|---|
| IMLP-001 | – | The McCoys | Hang on Sloopy (from US Bang) |
| IMLP-002 | – | Sam Cooke | The Wonderful World of Sam Cooke (featuring gospel material) |
| IMLP-003 | – | Aranbee Pop Symphony Orchestra | Today's Pop Symphony (directed by Keith Richards) |
| IMLP-004 | – | Mark Murphy | Who Can I Turn To |
| IMLP-005 | – | Chris Farlowe | 14 Things to Think About |
| IMLP-006 | – | Chris Farlowe | The Art of Chris Farlowe |
| IMLP-007 | – | Twice as Much | Own Up |
| IMLP-008 | Z12-52 002 | Small Faces | Small Faces (aka There Are But Four Small Faces) |
| IMLP-009 | – | Billy Nicholls | Would You Believe |
| IMLP-010 | – | Chris Farlowe | The Best of Chris Farlowe Vol. 1 |
| IMLP-011 | – | P.P. Arnold | The First Lady of Immediate |
| IMLP-012 | Z12-52 008 | Small Faces | Ogdens' Nut Gone Flake |
| IMLP-013 | – | Twice as Much | That's All |
| IMLP-014 | Z12-52 006 | Various | Blues Anytime Vol. 1 (reissued under several titles) |
| IMLP-015 | Z12-52 007 | Various | Blues Anytime Vol. 2 (reissued under several titles) |
| IMLP-016 | Z12-52 004 | The Nice | The Thoughts of Emerlist Davjack |
| IMLP-017 | Z12 52 016 | P.P. Arnold | Kafunta |
| IMLP-018 | Z12-52 012 | Duncan Browne | Give Me Take You |
| IMLP-019 | Z12-52 018 | Various | Blues Anytime Vol. 3 (reissued under several titles) |
| IMLP-020 | Z12-52 020 | The Nice | Ars Longa Vita Brevis |
| IMLP-021 | – | Chris Farlowe | The Last Goodbye |
| IMLP-022 | – | Small Faces | In Memoriam (not issued in the UK; only in Europe) |
| IMLP-023 | – | Amen Corner | National Welsh Coast Live Explosion Company |
| IMLP-024 | – | Various | Blues Leftovers (Blues Anytime Vol. 4) |
| IMLP-025 | IMOCS-101 | Humble Pie | As Safe As Yesterday Is |
| IMLP-026 | Z12-52 022 & IMOCS-102 | The Nice | Nice |
| IMLP-027 | – | Humble Pie | Town and Country |
| IMLP-028 | – | Amen Corner | Farewell to the Real Magnificent Seven |
EPs
| IMEP-001 | – | Chris Farlowe | Farlowe in the Midnight Hour |
| IMEP-002 | – | The McCoys | Hits Vol. 1 |
| IMEP-003 | – | The McCoys | Hits Vol. 2 |
| IMEP-004 | – | Chris Farlowe | Hits |
Double-albums
| IMAL-01/02 | – | Small Faces | The Autumn Stone |
| IMAL-03/04 | – | Various | Anthology of British Blues Volume 1 (reissue of Blues Anytime series) |
| IMAL-05/06 | – | Various | Anthology of British Blues Volume 2 (reissue of Blues Anytime series) |
Sampler albums
| IMLYIN | – | Various | Immediate Lets You In |
| IMLYIN-2 | – | Various | Happy to Be a Part of the Industry of Human Happiness |

=== Singles ===
| UK # | US # | Artist(s) | Song title |
|---|---|---|---|
| IM-001 | – | The McCoys | "Hang on Sloopy" (from US Bang) b/w "I Can't Explain It" |
| IM-002 | – | The Fifth Avenue | "The Bells of Rhymney" b/w "Just Like Anyone Would Do" |
| IM-003 | – | Nico | "I'm Not Sayin'" b/w "The Last Mile" |
| IM-004 | – | Gregory Phillips | "Down in the Boondocks" b/w "That's the One" |
| IM-005 | – | The Masterminds | "She Belongs to Me" b/w "Taken My Love" |
| IM-006 | – | The Poets | "Call Again" b/w "Some Things I Can't Forget" |
| IM-007 | – | The Strangeloves | "Cara-Lin" (from US Bang) b/w "(Roll On) Mississippi" |
| IM-008 | – | Van Lenton | "Gotta Get Away" b/w "You Don't Care" |
| IM-009 | – | The Factotums | "In My Lonely Room" b/w "A Run in the Green and Tangerine Flaked Forest" (Note: This is the same recording previously issued as "That's the One" on flip of IM-004) |
| IM-010 | – | The Golden Apples of the Sun | "The Monkey Time" b/w "Chocolate Rolls, Tea and Monopoly" |
| IM-011 | – | Barbara Lynn | "You Can't Buy My Love" (from US Tribe) b/w "That's What a Friend Will Do" |
| IM-012 | – | John Mayall & the Bluesbreakers | "I'm Your Witchdoctor" b/w "Telephone Blues" |
| IM-013 | – | Glyn Johns | "Mary Anne" b/w "Like Grains of Yellow Sand" |
| IM-014 | – | Mick Softley | "I'm So Confused" b/w "She's My Girl" |
| IM-015 | – | The Mockingbirds | "You Stole My Love" b/w "Skit Skat" |
| IM-016 | – | Chris Farlowe | "The Fool" b/w "Treat Her Good" |
| IM-017 | – | Joey Vine | "Down & Out" b/w "The Out of Towner" |
| IM-018 | – | Jimmy Tarbuck | "Someday" b/w "Wastin' Time" |
| IM-019 | – | The Variations | "The Man With All the Toys" b/w "She'll Know I'm Sorry" |
| IM-020 | – | Les Fleur de Lys | "Moondreams" b/w "Wait for Me" |
| IM-021 | – | The McCoys | "Fever" (from US Bang) b/w "Sorrow" |
| IM-022 | – | The Factotums | "You're So Good to Me" b/w "Can't Go Home Anymore My Love" |
| IM-023 | – | Chris Farlowe | "Think" b/w "Don't Just Look at Me" |
| IM-024 | – | The Poets | "Baby Don't You Do It" b/w "I'll Come Home" |
| IM-025 | – | Charles Dickens | "So Much in Love" b/w "Our Soul Brother TH" |
| IM-026 | – | Goldie | "Going Back" b/w "Headlines" |
| IM-027 | – | Tony Rivers and the Castaways | "Girl Don't Tell Me" b/w "The Girl From Salt Lake City" |
| IM-028 | – | The McCoys | "Don't Worry Mother, Your Son's Heart Is Pure" (from US Bang) b/w "Ko-Ko" |
| IM-029 | – | The McCoys | "Up and Down" (from US Bang) b/w "If You Tell a Lie" |
| IM-030 | – | The London Waits | "Softly, Softly" (theme from the BBC Television series Softly, Softly) b/w "Serenadio (Italian Serenade)" |
| IM-031 | – | The Turtles | "You Baby" b/w "Wanderin' Kind" |
| IM-032 | – | Les Fleur de Lys | "Circles" b/w "So, Come On" |
| IM-033 | K-13530 | Twice as Much | "Sittin' on a Fence" b/w "Baby I Want You" |
| IM-034 | – | The McCoys | "Runaway" b/w "Come on Let's Go" |
| IM-035 | K-13567 | Chris Farlowe | "Out of Time" b/w "Baby Make It Soon" |
| IM-036 | K-13600 | Twice as Much | "Step Out of Line" b/w "Simplified" |
| IM-037 | – | The McCoys | "(You Make Me Feel) So Good" (from US Bang) b/w "Everyday I Have to Cry" |
| IM-038 | – | Chris Farlowe | "Ride On, Baby" b/w "Headlines" |
| IM-039 | – | Twice as Much | "True Story" b/w "You're So Good for Me" |
| IM-040 | – | P.P. Arnold | "Everything's Gonna Be Alright" b/w "Life Is But Nothing" |
| IM-041 | – | Chris Farlowe | "My Way of Giving" b/w "You're So Good to Me" |
| IM-042 | – | Twice as Much | "Crystal Ball" b/w "Why Can't They All Go and Leave Me Alone" |
| IM-043 | – | Apostolic Intervention | "(Tell Me) Have You Ever Seen Me" b/w "Madame Garcia" |
| IM-044 | – | Nicky Scott | "Big City" b/w "Everything's Gonna Be Alright" |
| IM-045 | – | Nicky Scott | "Backstreet Girl" b/w "Chain Reaction" |
| IM-046 | – | The McCoys | "I Got to Go Back" (from US Bang) b/w "Dynamite" |
| IM-047 | E-1901 | P.P. Arnold | "The First Cut Is the Deepest" b/w "Speak to Me" |
| IM-048 | – | Mort Shuman IV | "Monday, Monday" b/w "Little Children" |
| IM-049 | – | Chris Farlowe | "Yesterday's Papers" b/w "Life Is But Nothing" |
| IM-050 | E-1902 | Small Faces | "Here Come the Nice" b/w "Talk to You" |
| IM-051 | ZS7-502 | John Mayall & the Bluesbreakers with Eric Clapton | "I'm Your Witchdoctor" b/w "Telephone Blues" |
| IM-052 | – | Marquis of Kensington | "The Changing of the Guard" b/w "Reverse Thrust" |
| IM-053 | – | Murray Head | "She Was Perfection" b/w "Secondhand Monday" |
| IM-054 | – | The Australian Playboys | "Black Sheep R.I.P." b/w "Sad" |
| IM-055 | – | P.P. Arnold | "The Time Has Come" b/w "If You See What I Mean" |
| IM-056 | – | Chris Farlowe | "Moanin'" b/w "What Have I Been Doing?" |
| IM-057 | ZS7-501 | Small Faces | "Itchycoo Park" b/w "I'm Only Dreaming" |
| IM-058 | – | Warm Sounds | "Sticks and Stones" b/w "Angeline" |
| – | ZS7-5002 | Chris Farlowe | "Paint It Black" b/w "You're So Good to Me" |
| IM-059 | ZS7-5004 | The Nice | "The Thoughts of Emerlist Davjack" b/w "Azrial (The Angel of Death)" |
| IM-060 | – | Rod Stewart | "Little Miss Understood" b/w "So Much to Say (So Little Time)" |
| IM-061 | ZS7-5006 | P.P. Arnold | "(If You Think You're) Groovy" b/w "Though It Hurts Me Badly" |
| IM-062 | ZS7-5003 | Small Faces | "Tin Soldier" b/w "I Feel Much Better" |
| IM-063 | – | Billy Nicholls | "Would You Believe" b/w "Daytime Girl" |
| IM-064 | ZS7-5007 | Small Faces | "Lazy Sunday" b/w "Rollin' Over (Part II of Happiness Stan)" |
| IM-065 | ZS7-5005 | Chris Farlowe | "Handbags and Gladrags" b/w "Everyone Makes a Mistake" |
| IM-066 | – | Chris Farlowe | "The Last Goodbye" (from the film The Last Goodbye) b/w "Paperman Fly in the Sky" |
| IM-067 | – | The Outer Limits | "Great Train Robbery" b/w "Sweet Freedom" |
| IM-067 | – | P.P. Arnold | "Angel of the Morning" b/w "Life Is But Nothing" |
| IM-068 | ZS7-5008 | The Nice | "America" (from the musical West Side Story) b/w "The Diamond Hard Blue Apples of the Moon" |
| IM-069 | ZS7-5009 | Small Faces | "The Universal" b/w "Donkey Rides, a Penny a Glass" |
| IM-070 | ZS7-5010 | Duncan Browne | "On the Bombsite" b/w "Alfred Bell" |
| IM-071 | ZS7-5011 | Chris Farlowe | "Paint It Black" b/w "I Just Need Your Loving" (UK), "What Have I Been Doing?" (US) |
| IM-072 | – | The Nice | "Brandenburger" b/w "Happy Freuds" |
| – | ZS7-5012 | Small Faces | "Mad John" b/w "The Journey" |
| IM-073 | ZS7-5013 | Amen Corner | "(If Paradise Is) Half as Nice" b/w "Hey Hey Girl" |
| IM-074 | – | Chris Farlowe | "Dawn" b/w "April Was the Month" |
| IM-075 | – | Mike d'Abo | "(See the Little People) Gulliver's Travels" (from the show Gulliver's Travels) b/w "An Anthology of Gulliver's Travels – Part Two" |
| IM-076 | – | The McCoys | "Hang on Sloopy" (from US Bang) b/w "This Is Where We Came In" |
| IM-077 | ZS7-5014 | Small Faces | "Afterglow of Your Love" b/w "Wham Bam Thank You Man" |
| IM-078 | – | Chris Farlowe | "Out of Time" b/w "Ride on Baby" |
| IM-079 | – | P.P. Arnold | "The First Cut Is the Deepest" b/w "The Time Has Come" |
| IM-080 | – | Fleetwood Mac (B-side under alias Earl Vince and the Valiants) | "Man of the World" b/w "Somebody's Gonna Get Their Head Kicked in Tonite" |
| IM-081 | – | Amen Corner | "Hello Susie" b/w "Evil Man's Gonna Win" |
| IM-082 | IMOC-001 | Humble Pie | "Natural Born Bugie" (aka "Natural Born Woman") b/w "Wrist Job" (aka "I'll Go Alone") |
| IM-083 | ZS7-5015 | (unused – reportedly slated to feature P.P. Arnold's "Would You Believe" b/w "Am I Still Dreaming") | |
| IM-084 | – | Amen Corner | "Get Back" b/w "Farewell to the Real Magnificent Seven" |
| – | ZS7-5016 | The Hill | "Sylvie" b/w "The Fourth Annual Convention of the Battery Hen Farmers Association – Part II" |
| IM-085 | – | Amen Corner | Greatest Hits Immediate IML 2004 Year 1977 |

== See also ==
- List of record labels: I–Q
