= Jerry Shirley =

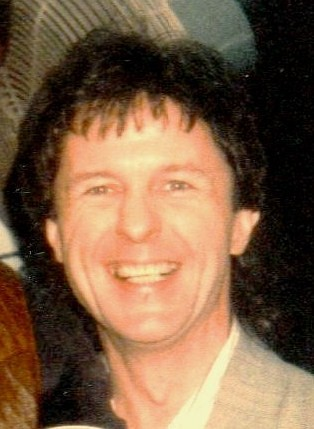

Background information
- Born: Jeremy Duncan Tipson Shirley; 4 February 1952 (age 74); Waltham Cross, Hertfordshire, England
- Genres: Rock; hard rock
- Occupation: Musician
- Instruments: Drums; percussion; keyboards
- Years active: 1969–present
- Formerly of: The Apostolic Intervention; Humble Pie; Fastway

Jeremy Duncan Tipson Shirley (born 4 February 1952), known professionally as Jerry Shirley, is an English rock drummer, best known as a member of the band Humble Pie, appearing on all their albums. He is also known for his work with ex-Motörhead guitarist "Fast" Eddie Clarke's Fastway, Joey Molland from Badfinger, Alexis Korner, Billy Nicholls, Syd Barrett, John Entwistle, Sammy Hagar and Benny Mardones.

== Career ==
Shirley was born on 4 February 1952 in Waltham Cross, Hertfordshire, and began playing drums for the band the Apostolic Intervention at an early age. He was later recruited by Steve Marriott to join the then newly formed rock band Humble Pie when he was 17 years old. Shirley remained Humble Pie's drummer for the majority of the group's history, and he is the only original member who played on every album. He also worked on Steve Marriott's solo projects, such as Packet of Three and was a co-founder of the popular 1980s group Fastway. Shirley co-wrote Fastway's biggest hit, "Say What You Will".

In 1970 he worked on Syd Barrett's two solo albums. On the debut LP The Madcap Laughs he played with David Gilmour and Roger Waters, as well as Soft Machine members Mike Ratledge, Hugh Hopper and Robert Wyatt. On this first record, Shirley shared drums duties with Wyatt and Willie Wilson. On Barrett, he worked with David Gilmour and Richard Wright, again sharing the drums with Willie Wilson.

After leaving Fastway, Shirley joined the line-up of Waysted and reformed Humble Pie in the United States, with Charlie Huhn as vocalist. Shirley was the only original group member, and they were billed as Humble Pie Featuring Jerry Shirley. They performed with a fluid line-up for ten years before disbanding. During this period, Shirley also worked as a disc jockey at WNCX, a classic rock station in Cleveland, Ohio. In 1997, he was fired by WNCX and pleaded guilty to drug abuse after money went missing in a charity drive called "30 Days in the Hole."

Shirley returned to the UK in 1999. In 2000 he reformed Humble Pie with their original bassist Greg Ridley and another former band member, guitarist and vocalist Bobby Tench. They recorded Humble Pie's eleventh studio album Back on Track (2002), and he also appeared in a memorial concert for former Humble Pie bandmate Steve Marriott. More recently he has performed with the Deborah Bonham Band and played on her album Duchess.

== Discography ==
=== Apostolic Intervention ===
==== Single ====
- 1967 : "(Tell Me) Have You Ever Seen Me?"/"Madame Garcia" – Immediate Records

=== Humble Pie ===
==== Studio albums ====
- 1969 : As Safe as Yesterday Is – Immediate Records
- 1969 : Town and Country – Immediate Records
- 1970 : Humble Pie – A&M Records
- 1971 : Rock On – A&M
- 1972 : Smokin' – A&M
- 1973 : Eat It – A&M
- 1974 : Thunderbox – A&M
- 1975 : Street Rats – A&M
- 1980 : On to Victory – Atco Records
- 1981 : Go for the Throat – Atco
- 2002 : Back on Track – Sanctuary Records

==== Live albums ====
- 1971 : Performance Rockin' the Fillmore – A&M Records
- 1995 : King Biscuit Flower Hour Presents: In Concert Humble Pie Live 1973 – King Biscuit Flower Hour Records – 908015.2
- 2000 : Extended Versions – BMG Special Products
- 2000 : Natural Born Boogie: The BBC Sessions - Band of Joy – BOJCD010
- 2002 : Live at the Whiskey A-Go-Go '69 – Sanctuary Records
- 2013 : Performance Rockin' the Fillmore: The Complete Recordings – Omnivore Recordings

==== Compilation albums ====
- 1973 : Lost and Found – A&M (No. 37 US)
- 1976 : Back Home Again – Immediate UK
- 1977 : Greatest Hits – Immediate UK
- 1982 : Best of Humble Pie – A&M
- 1987 : Classics Volume 14 – A&M
- 1994 : Early Years – Griffin
- 1994 : Hot n' Nasty: The Anthology – A&M
- 1997 : The Scrubbers Sessions – Archive/Paradigm
- 1999 : The Immediate Years: Natural Born Boogie – Recall (UK)
- 1999 : Running with the Pack – Pilot
- 2000 : Twentieth Century Masters: The Millennium Collection – A&M
- 2005 : The Atlanta Years (previously unreleased studio album (1980) and live performance (1983))
- 2006 : The Definitive Collection
- 2006 : One More for the Old Tosser

=== Natural Gas ===
- 1976 : Natural Gas (Private Stock PS 2011)

=== Magnet ===
- 1979 : Worldwide Attraction

=== Fastway ===
- 1983 : Fastway
- 1984 : All Fired Up

=== Waysted ===
- 1985 : The Good the Bad the Waysted

=== Collaborations ===
- 1970 : The Madcap Laughs by Syd Barrett - with David Gilmour, Roger Waters, Mike Ratledge, Hugh Hopper and Robert Wyatt.
- 1970 : Barrett by Syd Barrett - with David Gilmour, Richard Wright and Willie Wilson.
- 1971 : Smash Your Head Against the Wall by John Entwistle
- 1976 : Nine on a Ten Scale by Sammy Hagar
- 1978 : Thank God for Girls from Benny Mardones

DVD :

- 2001 : Steve Marriott Live by Steve Marriott
