= Greg Ridley =

English rock bassist (1947–2003)

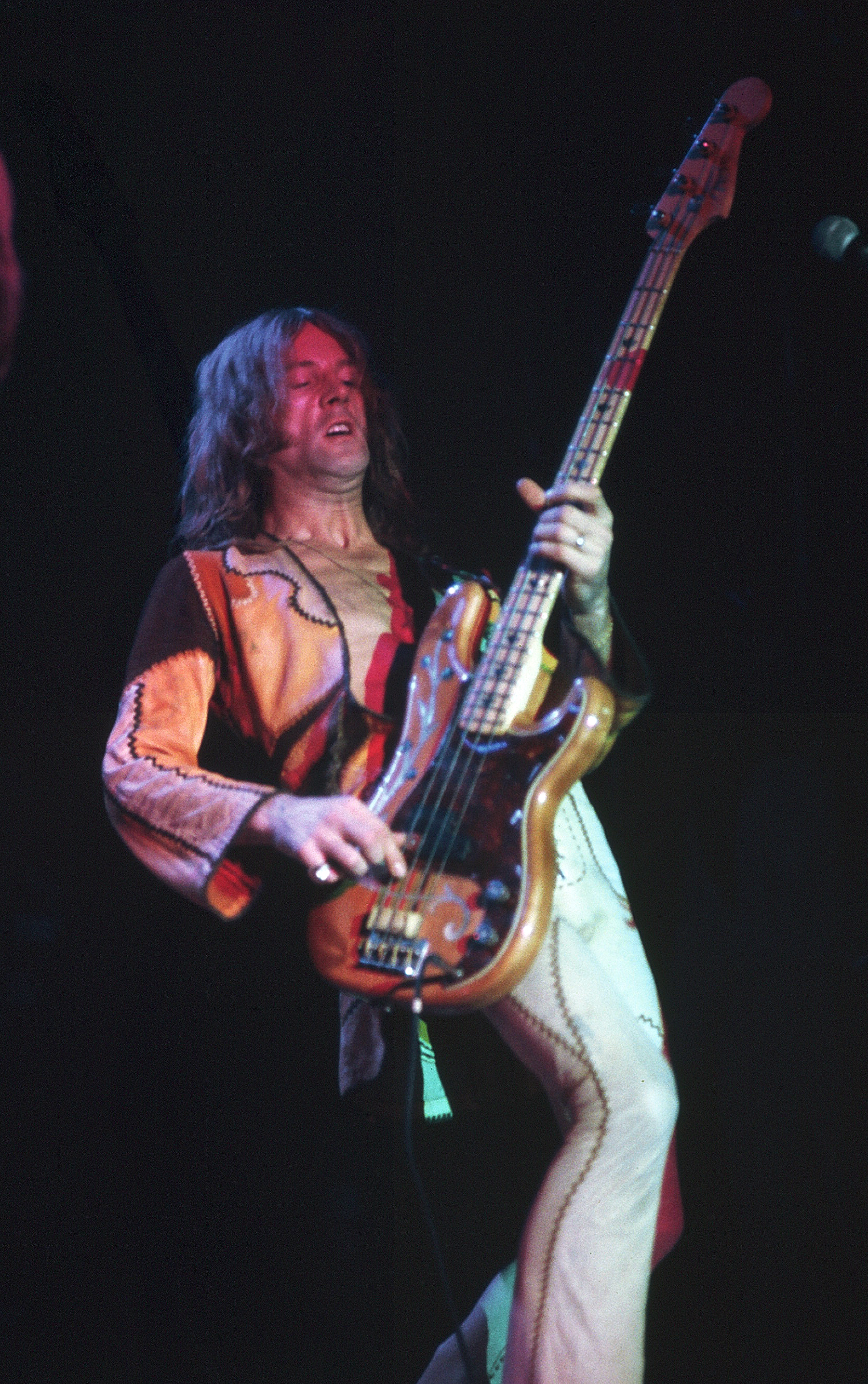
- Greg Ridley in 1973

Background information
- Born: Alfred Gregory Ridley; 23 October 1947; Carlisle, Cumberland, England
- Died: 19 November 2003 (aged 56) Alicante, Spain
- Genres: Rock, R&B, hard rock
- Occupation: Bassist
- Instruments: Bass guitar, guitar, vocals
- Years active: 1964–2003

Alfred Gregory Ridley (23 October 1947 – 19 November 2003) was an English bassist who was the bassist and a founding member of the rock band Humble Pie and Spooky Tooth.

== Career ==
Ridley was born in Carlisle, Cumberland, England. Early in his career he played under the name Dino as guitarist for "Dino & the Danubes" before joining bands such as the Ramrods. Ridley and Mike Harrison formed The V.I.P.'s in 1963, playing blues-based music. The band added guitarist Luther Grosvenor and organist/pianist Keith Emerson, who stayed for a brief period of time before leaving and forming The Nice. Subsequently, the VIPs changed their name to Art, for the album Supernatural Fairy Tales and then, with the addition of American keyboardist Gary Wright, to Spooky Tooth in 1968. Spooky Tooth signed to Island and recorded two albums It's All About (1968) and Spooky Two (1969).

In January 1969, Ridley was approached by Steve Marriott from the Small Faces, who was part of a new band, to be called Humble Pie. The line up also included Humble Pie founder and guitarist Peter Frampton from The Herd and drummer Jerry Shirley. Humble Pie's first album As Safe As Yesterday Is was released, and a second album, Town and Country, was also released in the same year. A contract with A&M Records and a re-working of their sound into a harder brand of music, coupled with extensive touring of the United States followed. A double album Performance Rockin' the Fillmore, featuring a now-historic recording of a raw performance of rare quality, catapulted Humble Pie into rock history. Ridley's powerful bass playing anchored the band's performance and was at the centre of their sound. Together, Ridley and drummer Jerry Shirley comprised one of the most respected rhythm sections in rock music during this period. Although Ridley rarely sang lead vocals, his deep baritone was frequently used to provide contrast with the higher tenors of Marriott and Frampton. Ridley made several songwriting contributions, including "Sucking on the Sweet Vine" on Humble Pie, "The Light of Love" on Town and Country, and "Big George" on Rock On.

This incarnation of Humble Pie continued until 1975 and Ridley left the music business, after finishing an unreleased album with Marriott and abortive attempts with bands such as Mike Patto and Ollie Halsall's band Boxer. Ridley moved to Gloucestershire and lived in a stone cottage in the Forest of Dean with his girlfriend. He found the peace and quiet of country life a pleasant and refreshing change to touring and recording. He became involved in the antique furniture business, and throughout the 1980s, he was a low-key antique trader and stripped pine furniture for other traders as a business.

On 14 April 2001, he appeared with Jerry Shirley, Peter Frampton and Clem Clempson, billed as a one off Humble Pie re-union, at a Steve Marriott Tribute Concert. Earlier that year, he had also become involved with a Humble Pie project initiated by Jerry Shirley's reactivation of the group, and the enlisting of another former Humble Pie guitarist and vocalist Bobby Tench. This resulted in the album Back on Track, released by Sanctuary in 2002, and a short tour of Germany with Company of Snakes during the early part of 2003. The project was cut short when Ridley became ill.

== Death ==
On 19 November 2003, Ridley died in Alicante, Spain, of pneumonia and resulting complications. He was 56. His funeral was paid for by a concert organised by harmonica player Dave Hunt.

== Discography ==
=== The VIP's ===
- Singles:
- Don't Keep Shouting at Me / She's So Good (RCA Victor [UK], 1964)
- Mercy Mercy / That's My Woman (Philips, 1966)
- Wintertime / Anyone (CBS, 1966)
- I Wanna Be Free / Don't Let It Go (Island, 1966)
- Straight Down to the Bottom / In A Dream (Island, 1967)
- EPs:
- Stagger Lee / Rosemarie / Late Night Blues (1966) - with Keith Emerson on piano & organ
- What's That Sound (For What It's Worth) / Come on Up / Think I'm Going Weird / Rome Take Away Three (1967)
- I Wanna Be Free / Don't Let It Go / Smokestack Lightning (1967)
- Straight Down to the Bottom / Back into My Life Again / Every Girl I See / In A Dream (1967)
- Compilations:
- Live at Twen Club 1966 & More (1990)
- I Wanna Be Free (1990)
- The Complete VIP's (2007) 2-CD

=== Art ===
- Supernatural Fairy Tales (1967)

=== Spooky Tooth ===
- It's All About Spooky Tooth (1968)
- Spooky Two (1969)
- Cross Purpose (1999)

=== Humble Pie ===
- Studio Albums:
- As Safe As Yesterday Is (1969)
- Town and Country (1969)
- Humble Pie (1970)
- Rock On (1971)
- Smokin' (1972)
- Eat It (1973)
- Thunderbox (1974)
- Street Rats (1975)
- Humble Pie: The Scrubbers Sessions (1999) (Eagle) - recorded in 1974 with Boz Burrell, Mel Collins, Ian Wallace
- Back on Track (2002)
- Live Albums:
- Performance Rockin' the Fillmore (1971)
- King Biscuit Flower Hour Presents: In Concert Humble Pie Live 1973 (1995) (King Biscuit Entertainment)
- In Concert (1996) (King Biscuit Entertainment) - new edition/reissue of the first released version
- Extended Versions (2000)
- Natural Born Boogie: The BBC Sessions (2000)
- Live at the Whiskey A-Go-Go '69 (2002)
- Performance Rockin' the Fillmore: The Complete Recordings (2013) (Omnivore Recordings) 4-CD Boxset

=== Collaborations ===
- Marriott - Steve Marriott (1976) - with Ian Wallace
- Steve Marriott's Scrubbers - Steve Marriott (1996) - with Ian Wallace
