= Best of the Outlaws: Green Grass and High Tides =

Compilation album by Outlaws
- Released: 1996
- Recorded: 1975–1980
- Genre: Southern rock
- Length: 70:22
- Label: Arista
- Producer: Bill Jones

Outlaws chronology
Diablo Canyon (1994)	Best of the Outlaws: Green Grass and High Tides (1996)	So Low (1999)

Professional ratings
Review scores
Source	Rating
AllMusic	4.5/5 stars

The Best of the Outlaws: Green Grass and High Tides is a sixteen-track compilation album by American southern rock band Outlaws. It was released in 1996 and features all their major hits, including the Rock Band-featured southern rock epic "Green Grass and High Tides".

== Track listing ==
1. "There Goes Another Love Song" (Hughie Thomasson, Monte Yoho) - 3:05
2. "Knoxville Girl" (Henry Paul) - 3:31
3. "Song for You" (Bill Jones, Thomasson) - 3:32
4. "Waterhole" (Outlaws) - 2:05
5. "Green Grass and High Tides" (Thomasson) - 9:48
6. "Breaker Breaker" (Thomasson) - 2:57
7. "South Carolina" (Paul) - 3:04
8. "Freeborn Man" (Keith Allison, Mark Lindsay) - 4:49
9. "Prisoner" (Jones) - 3:57
10. "Girl from Ohio" (Paul) - 5:01
11. "Stick Around for Rock & Roll (Thomasson) - 6:37
12. "Hurry Sundown" (Thomasson) - 4:06
13. "Gunsmoke" (Paul, Yoho) - 4:19
14. "You Are the Show" (Thomasson) - 4:55
15. "Take It Any Way You Want It" (Jones, Thomasson) - 3:19
16. "(Ghost) Riders in the Sky" (Stan Jones) - 5:51

== Production personnel ==
- Compilation producer – Al Quaglieri
- Art direction – Andela Skouras
- Reissue design – Satoshi Kobayashi
- Original logo design – Jeanne Paul
- Cover photography – John Gellman
- Liner notes – Henry Paul and Hughie Thomasson
- Mastered by Bob Irwin and Kip Smith at Sundazed Studios, Coxsackie, New York.

== See also ==
- Wanted! The Outlaws
- Outlaws (Outlaws album)
