= List of southern rock bands =

This is a list of Southern rock bands that fall into one of the following four categories, with a sign denoting them as such following the description.

- Traditional or mainstream Southern rock bands *
- Southern hard rock or metal bands **
- Bands (rock or hard rock) that cite Southern rock influence ♪
- Bands that may not necessarily be traditional southern rock, but fuse qualities of Southern rock with another genre, making a sort of sub-subgenre of alternative Southern rock. These fusions include but are not limited to country, bluegrass, blues, blues rock, and boogie woogie.

== 0–9 ==
- .38 Special *

== A ==
- Alabama Shakes *
- Allen Collins Band *
- Allman Brothers Band *
- Arc Angels
- Artimus Pyle Band *
- Atlanta Rhythm Section

== B ==
- Band of Horses
- Barefoot Jerry *
- Black Oak Arkansas *
- The Black Crowes *
- Black Stone Cherry **
- Blackberry Smoke *
- Blackfoot */**
- Bo Bice
- The Bottle Rockets*

== C ==
- The Cadillac Three *
- Charlie Daniels Band *
- Corrosion of Conformity **
- Cowboy *
- Creedence Clearwater Revival *
- Cross Canadian Ragweed*
- Cry of Love*

== D ==
- Dangerous Toys
- Danny Joe Brown Band *
- The Derek Trucks Band *
- Dickey Betts *
- Dixie Dregs *
- Doc Holliday *
- Down **
- Drive-By Truckers *
- Drivin N Cryin *

== E ==
- Edgar Winter Group*
- Elvin Bishop *
- Eagles

== F ==
- The Fabulous Thunderbirds *

== G ==
- The Georgia Satellites *
- Gov't Mule *
- Gregg Allman Band *
- Grinderswitch *

== H ==
- Hank Williams Jr *
- Henry Paul Band

== J ==
- JJ Grey & MOFRO *
- Jackyl *
- Jason Isbell & the 400 Unit *
- Johnny Winter *

== K ==
- The Kentucky Headhunters *
- Kings of Leon*

== L ==
- Legendary Shack Shakers
- Leon Russell *
- Lonnie Mack *
- Lynyrd Skynyrd *

== M ==
- Marcus King Band *
- Marshall Tucker Band *
- Maylene and the Sons of Disaster **
- Molly Hatchet */**
- Moon Dog Mane **
- Mudcrutch
- My Morning Jacket *

== N ==
- Needtobreathe *
- North Mississippi Allstars *

== O ==
- Outlaws *
- Ozark Mountain Daredevils *

== P ==
- Pimpadelic
- Point Blank *
- Potliquor*

== R ==
- The Radiators *
- Raging Slab * **
- The Rossington Band * **
- The Rossington-Collins Band *
- The Rounders *
- Royal Southern Brotherhood *

== S ==
- Saving Abel **
- Sea Level *
- Shooter Jennings *
- The Showdown **
- Sister Hazel *
- Sixty Watt Shaman **
- Southern Culture on the Skids
- The Steel Woods *
- Steve Gaines *
- Stevie Ray Vaughan & Double Trouble *
- Stillwater *

== T ==
- Tedeschi Trucks Band *
- Texas Hippie Coalition **
- Third Day *
- A Thousand Horses *
- Tom Petty and The Heartbreakers *
- Toy Caldwell *
- Travis Tritt *

== V ==
- Van Zant *

== W ==
- Warren Haynes*
- Webb Wilder *
- Wet Willie *
- Whiskey Myers*
- Widespread Panic *
- Will Hoge *
- The Word *

== Z ==
- ZZ Top *

== See also ==
- Country rock
- Heartland rock
- Roots rock
- Southern Rock
- Swamp rock
- Tulsa sound
- The Hot Club of Cowtown
