= Southern Rock Gold =

Greatest hits album by Various
- Released: October 11, 2005
- Recorded: Various
- Genre: Southern rock
- Length: 2.3 hours
- Label: Hip-O Records
- Producer: various

Professional ratings
Review scores
Source	Rating
Allmusic	link

Southern Rock Gold is a two-disc greatest hits compilation album released in 2005. It features 32 of the greatest hits from Southern rock, many of which are from the Universal Music Group catalogue. The liner notes on the CD consist of a 9 page article written in September 2005 by Scott Schinder about Southern rock with emphasis on a behind-the-scenes look at the songs and groups featured in the compilation. The article itself is followed by a list of the songs, including each song's author, recording date and the album it was originally released on.

The cover features, clockwise from the top left: Outlaws, Lynyrd Skynyrd, Wet Willie, Elvin Bishop, Atlanta Rhythm Section, Charlie Daniels, Stillwater, and The Allman Brothers Band.

== Track listing ==
=== Disc One ===
1. Lynyrd Skynyrd - "Sweet Home Alabama" (4:43) (Van Zant/Rossington/King)
2. The Allman Brothers Band - "Ramblin' Man" (4:47) (Betts)
3. The Marshall Tucker Band - "Heard It in a Love Song" (4.54) (Caldwell)
4. Ozark Mountain Daredevils - "If You Wanna Get to Heaven" (3:04) (Cash/Dillon)
5. The Charlie Daniels Band - "The South's Gonna Do It Again" (3:58) (Daniels)
6. Elvin Bishop - "Fooled Around and Fell in Love" (4:34) (Bishop)
7. Atlanta Rhythm Section - "Champagne Jam" (4:33) (Buie/Nix/Cobb)
8. .38 Special - "Hold On Loosely" (4:36) (Barnes/Peterik/Carlisi)
9. Molly Hatchet - "Flirtin' with Disaster" (4.58) (Brown/Hlubek/Thomas)
10. Blackfoot - "Highway Song" (7:31) (Medlocke/Spires)
11. Steve Earle - "Guitar Town" (2:33) (Earle)
12. The Kentucky Headhunters - "Walk Softly On This Heart of Mine" (3:44) (Monroe/Landers)
13. Sea Level - "Nothin' Matters But the Fever" (7.20) (Leavell)
14. Dixie Dregs - "Refried Funky Chicken" (3:17) (Morse)
15. Stillwater - "Mind Bender" [sic] (4.16) (Walker/Buie)
16. The Outlaws - "Green Grass and High Tides" (9:47) (Thomasson)

=== Disc Two ===
1. The Georgia Satellites - "Keep Your Hands to Yourself" (3:26) (Baird)
2. Delaney & Bonnie and Friends - "Only You Know and I Know" (3:26) (Mason)
3. Gregg Allman - "Midnight Rider" (4.26) (Allman)
4. Wet Willie - "Keep On Smilin'" (3:56) (Hall/Hall/Hirsch/Anthony/Ross)
5. Little Feat - "Dixie Chicken" (3.54) (George/Kibbee)
6. The Outlaws - "There Goes Another Love Song" (3:03) (Thomasson/Yoho)
7. Wet Willie - "Street Corner Serenade" (4:50) (Duke/Hall/Smith)
8. Elvin Bishop - "Travelin' Shoes" (7:16) (Bishop)
9. Atlanta Rhythm Section - "So Into You" (4:21) (Buie/Nix/Daughtry)
10. Johnny Van Zant - "Coming Home" (4:05) (Van Zant/Gay)
11. Rossington Collins Band - "Don't Misunderstand Me" (3:52) (Collins/Krantz/Harwood)
12. Arc Angels - "Living in a Dream" (4:52) (Sexton/Bramhall)
13. Cowboy - "Please Be With Me" (3:41) (Boyer)
14. The Marshall Tucker Band - "Can't You See" (6:01) (Caldwell)
15. Lynyrd Skynyrd - "Free Bird" (9:10) (Van Zant/Collins)
16. The Allman Brothers Band - "Whipping Post" (5.19) (Allman)

== See also ==
- Southern rock
- Swamp rock
