= List of Humble Pie members =

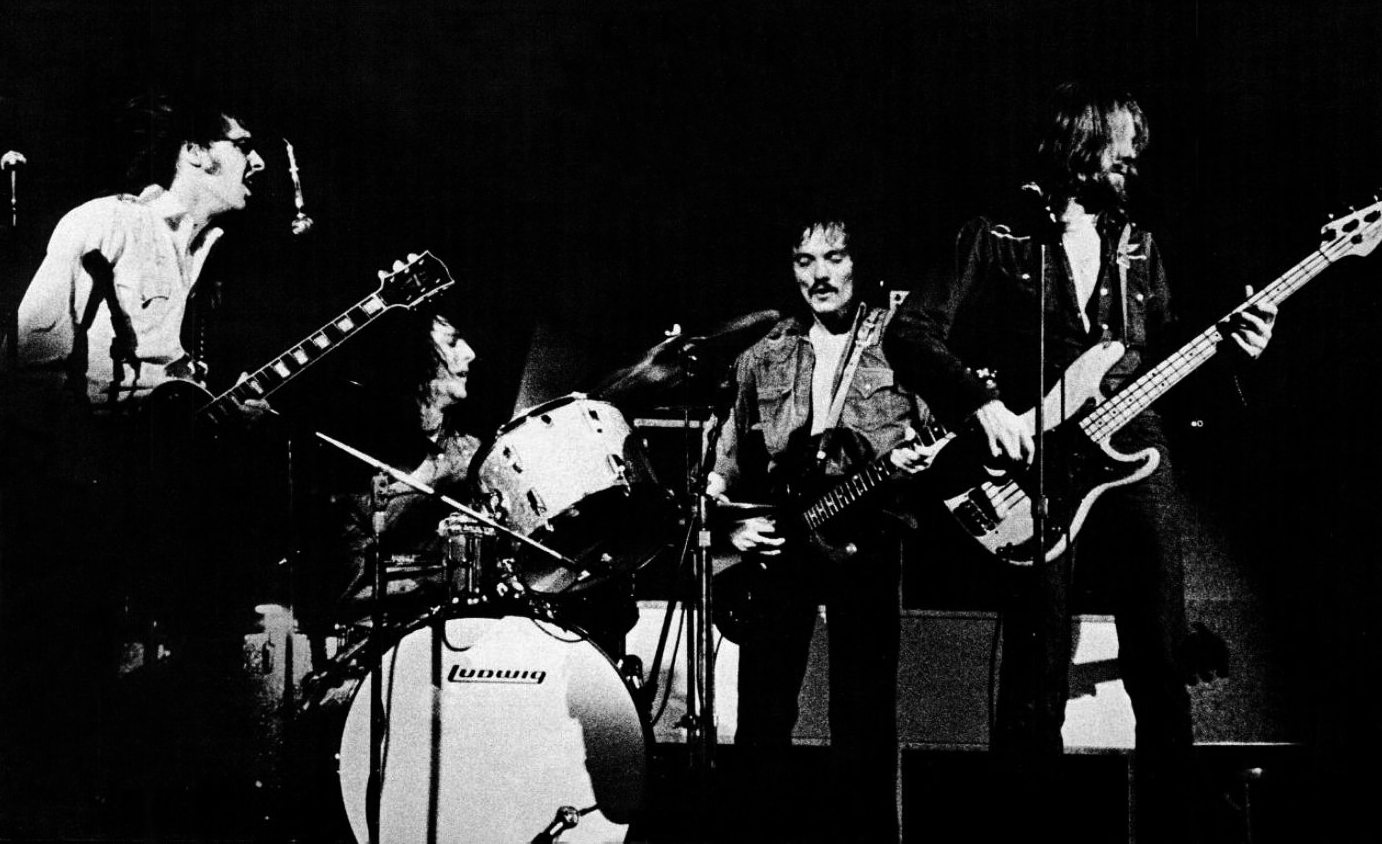
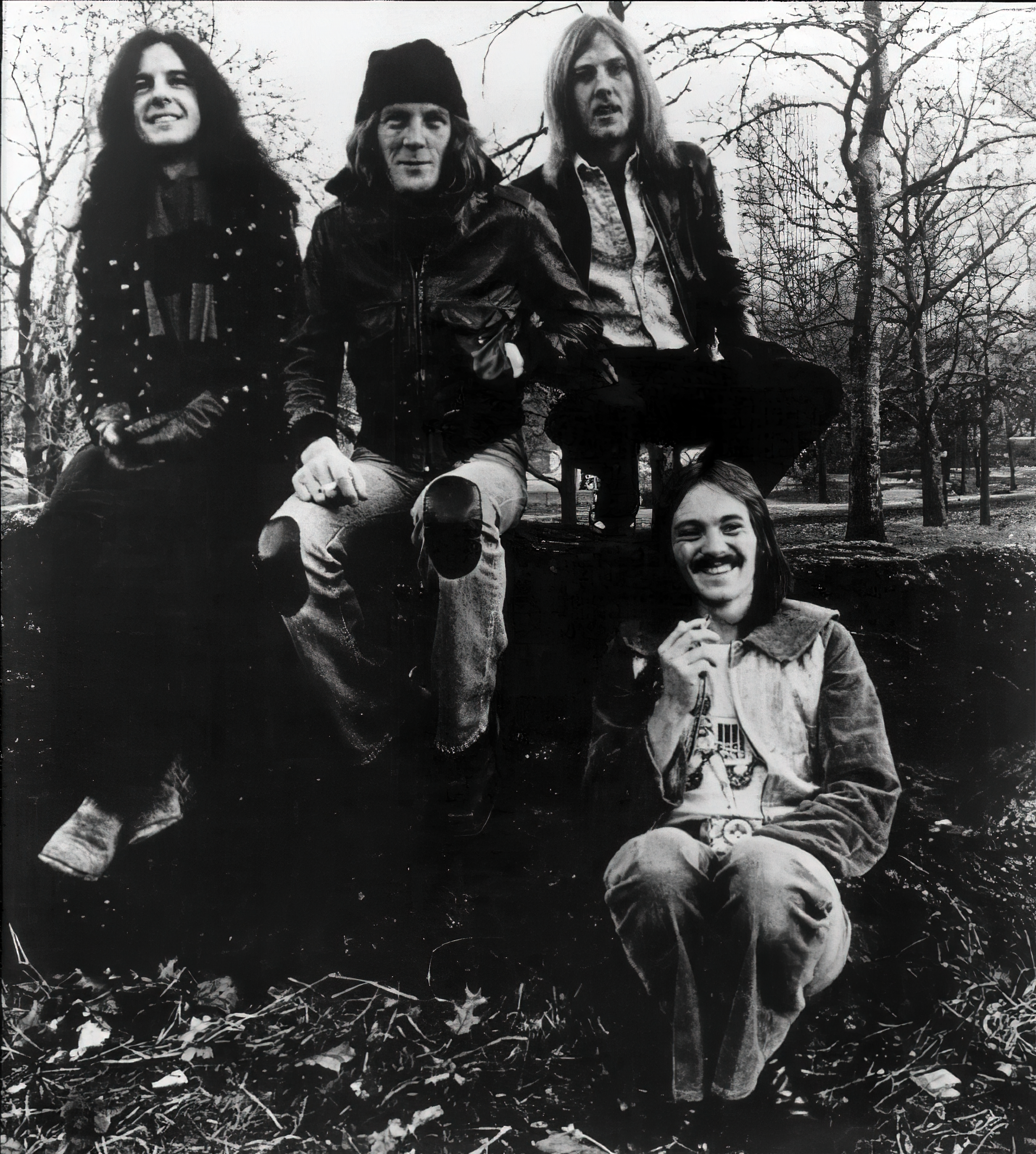
Two lineups of Humble Pie in 1971 (top) and 1974 (bottom).

Humble Pie are an English hard rock band from Moreton, Essex. Formed in January 1969, the group originally included vocalist and guitarist Steve Marriott, guitarist and vocalist Peter Frampton, bassist and vocalist Greg Ridley, and drummer Jerry Shirley. The band currently consists of Shirley (who does not tour with the band) alongside guitarist Dave Colwell (since 2001), bassist Ivan "Funkboy" Bodley and drummer Bobby Marks (both since 2018), and vocalist, guitarist and organist Jim Stapley (since 2023).

== History ==
=== 1969–1983 ===
Humble Pie were formed as a supergroup in January 1969 by Steve Marriott of Small Faces, Peter Frampton of the Herd, Greg Ridley of Spooky Tooth and Jerry Shirley of the Apostolic Intervention. Frampton remained until September 1971, when he left to start a solo career. The band's manager Dee Anthony explained that Frampton's departure was due to a lack of chemistry between him and Marriott, and suggested that the group would continue as a trio. However, he was replaced later in the year by former Colosseum guitarist David "Clem" Clempson. Humble Pie broke up in 1975 after the release of Street Rats, due to touring fatigue and personal conflicts.

Marriott and Shirley reformed Humble Pie in January 1980, adding guitarist Bobby Tench and bassist Anthony "Sooty" Jones. Both new members left in the summer of 1981 after a period of heavy touring. Marriott returned early the following year with bassist Jim Leverton, keyboardist Goldy McJohn and drummer Fallon Williams III, often billing themselves as "Steve Marriott and the Pie". McJohn was soon fired and Leverton later left, with guitarist Tommy Johnson and bassist Keith Christopher joining in early 1983; Johnson was subsequently dismissed and replaced by Phil Dix, and later by Rick Richards, who was fired alongside Christopher later in the year. Following a brief period as a trio with Williams and bassist Dave Hewitt, Marriott disbanded Humble Pie for a second time in late 1983.

=== 1989–present ===
In 1989, Shirley obtained the rights to the name Humble Pie and reformed the band in Cleveland, Ohio as "Humble Pie featuring Jerry Shirley", adding lead vocalist and guitarist Charlie Huhn, lead guitarist Wally Stocker and returning bassist Jones. In the early 1990s, Marriott and Frampton worked together again and a return of the original Humble Pie lineup was rumoured Marriott died in a house fire on 20 April 1991 ending this speculation. Shirley continued performing under the Humble Pie name with various musicians until August 1999, when he was forced to retire after suffering injuries in a car accident. Huhn completed a string of shows with guitarist Rick Craig (later replaced by Patrick Thomas), bassists Ean Evans and Kent Gascoyne and drummer Jamie Darnell. Huhn went on to join Foghat later on in 2000.

Shirley then reformed Humble Pie again in 2001 to mark the tenth anniversary of Marriott's death adding original bassist Ridley, former guitarist Tench and rhythm guitarist Dave Colwell all of whom recorded the album Back on Track, the band's first since 1981. Keyboardist Dean Rees and Johnny Warman on vocals also guitar completed the lineup for a short European tour during 2002. This tour was cut short when Ridley became ill due to pneumonia which led to his death on 19 November 2003.

Ridley and Colwell reformed the band with American singer Jimmy Kunes (Cactus, Savoy Brown), co-lead guitarist James Volpe Rotondi (Mr. Bungle, AIR), R&B bassist Ivan "Funkboy" Bodley (Sam Moore, The Shirelles), and drummer Bobby Marks (Dokken, Joe Lynn Turner), for tours of the US in 2018 and 2019. The band returned in 2022 with Jim Stapley replacing Kunes and Rotondi.

== Members ==
=== Current ===
Image	Name	Years active	Instruments	Release contributions
	Jerry Shirley	1969–1975; 1980–1981; 1989–1999; 2001–2002; 2018–present (not touring)	drums; percussion; occasional keyboards, piano, guitar and vocals	all Humble Pie releases
	Dave Colwell	2001–2002; 2018–present	guitar; backing vocals; mandolin	Back on Track (2002)
	Ivan "Funkboy" Bodley	2018–present	bass	none to date
	Bobby Marks	2018–present	drums	none to date
	Jim Stapley	2023–present	vocals; guitar; keyboards; harmonica	

=== Former ===
Image	Name	Years active	Instruments	Release contributions
	Steve Marriott	1969–1975; 1980–1983 (died 1991)	guitar; vocals; keyboards; harmonica; piano	all Humble Pie releases except Live at the Cleveland Agora Theatre (1990) and Back on Track (2002)
	Greg Ridley	1969–1975; 2001–2002 (died 2003)	bass; vocals; occasional guitar and percussion	all Humble Pie releases from As Safe as Yesterday Is (1969) to Street Rats (1975), and from Natural Born Boogie (1995) to Live in New York 1971 (2012)
	Peter Frampton	1969–1971	guitar; vocals; keyboards	all Humble Pie releases from As Safe as Yesterday Is (1969) to Performance Rockin' the Fillmore (1971)
	David "Clem" Clempson	1971–1975	guitar; vocals; keyboards	all Humble Pie releases from Smokin' (1972) to Street Rats (1975); King Biscuit Flower Hour Presents: Humble Pie (1995); Running with the Pack (1999); From the Front Row... Live! (2003); Live in New York 1971 (2012)
	Anthony "Sooty" Jones	1980–1981; 1989 (died 1999)	bass; vocals	On to Victory (1980); Go for the Throat (1981)
	Bobby Tench	1980–1981; 2001–2002; (died 2024)	guitar; vocals; keyboards	On to Victory (1980); Go for the Throat (1981); Back on Track (2002)
	Tim Hinkley	1975; 1997; (died 2024)	keyboards	Street Rats (1975); The Scrubber Sessions (1997)
	Fallon Williams III	1982–1983	drums	none
	Jim Leverton	1982–1983	bass; vocals	none
	Goldy McJohn	1982 (died 2017)	keyboards	none
	Keith Christopher	1983	bass	none
	Tommy Johnson	1983	guitar	none
	Phil Dix	1983	guitar	none
	Rick Richards	1983	guitar	none
	Dave Hewitt	1983	bass	none
	Charlie Huhn	1989–2000	vocals; guitar	Live at the Cleveland Agora Theatre (1990)
	Wally Stocker	1989–1990	guitar; backing vocals	Live at the Cleveland Agora Theatre (1990)
	Sean Beavan	1989–1990	bass	Live at the Cleveland Agora Theatre (1990)
	Scott Allen	1990–1992	bass	none
	Alan Greene	1990–1999	guitar	none
	Sam Nemon	1992–1996	bass	none
	Brad Johnson	1996–1999	bass	none
	Ean Evans	2000 (died 2009)	bass	none
	Kent Gascoyne	2000	bass	none
	Jamie Darnell	2000	drums	none
	Rick Craig	2000	guitar	none
	Patrick Thomas	2000	guitar	none
	Zoot Money	2001–2002	keyboards; vocals	Back on Track (2002)
	Dean Rees	2002	keyboards	none
	Johnny Warman	2002	vocals; guitar	none
	Jimmy Kunes	2018–2022	vocals	none
	James Volpe Rotondi	2018–2022	guitar; vocals; keyboards	none

== Line-ups ==
Period	Members	Releases
January 1969 – September 1971	Steve Marriott – vocals, guitar, keyboards; Peter Frampton – guitar, keyboards, vocals; Greg Ridley – bass, guitar, vocals; Jerry Shirley – drums, percussion	As Safe as Yesterday Is (1969); Town and Country (1969); Humble Pie (1970); Rock On (1971); Performance Rockin' the Fillmore (1971); Natural Born Boogie (1995); Live at the Whisky A-Go-Go '69 (2001)
November 1971 – early 1975	Steve Marriott – vocals, guitar, keyboards; Greg Ridley – bass, guitar, vocals; Jerry Shirley – drums, percussion; Clem Clempson – guitar, keyboards, vocals	Smokin' (1972); Eat It (1973); Thunderbox (1974); Street Rats (1975); Natural Born Boogie (1995) – two tracks; In Concert (1996); Running with the Pack (1999); From the Front Row... Live! (2003); Live in New York 1971 (2012); Joint Effort (2019)
Band inactive early 1975 – January 1980
January 1980 – summer 1981	Steve Marriott – vocals, guitar, keyboards; Jerry Shirley – drums, percussion; Bobby Tench – guitar, keyboards, vocals; Sooty Jones – bass, vocals	On to Victory (1980); Go for the Throat (1981); California '81 (2012)
Early – mid-1982	Steve Marriott – vocals, guitar; Jim Leverton – bass, vocals; Fallon Williams III – drums; Goldy McJohn – keyboards	none
Mid-1982 – early 1983	Steve Marriott – vocals, guitar; Jim Leverton – bass, vocals; Fallon Williams III – drums	none
1983	Steve Marriott – vocals, guitar; Fallon Williams III – drums; Tommy Johnson – guitar; Keith Christopher – bass	none
1983	Steve Marriott – vocals, guitar; Keith Christopher – bass; Fallon Williams III – drums; Phil Dix – guitar	none
1983	Steve Marriott – vocals, guitar; Keith Christopher – bass; Fallon Williams III – drums; Rick Richards – guitar	none
Late 1983	Steve Marriott – vocals, guitar; Fallon Williams III – drums; Dave Hewitt – bass	none
Band inactive 1984–1989
1989	Charlie Huhn – vocals, guitar; Wally Stocker – guitar, vocals; Sooty Jones – bass, vocals; Jerry Shirley – drums, percussion	none
1989–1990	Charlie Huhn – vocals, guitar; Wally Stocker – guitar, vocals; Jerry Shirley – drums, percussion; Sean Beavan – bass	Live at the Cleveland Agora Theatre (1990)
1990–1992	Charlie Huhn – vocals, guitar; Jerry Shirley – drums, percussion; Alan Greene – guitar; Scott Allen – bass	none
1992–1996	Charlie Huhn – vocals, guitar; Alan Greene – guitar; Jerry Shirley – drums, percussion; Sam Nemon – bass	none
1996–1999	Charlie Huhn – vocals, guitar; Alan Greene – guitar; Jerry Shirley – drums, percussion; Brad Johnson – bass	none
1999–2000	Charlie Huhn – vocals, guitar; Rick Craig – guitar; Ean Evans – bass; Kent Gascoyne – bass; Jamie Darnell – drums	none
2000	Charlie Huhn – vocals, guitar; Ean Evans – bass; Kent Gascoyne – bass; Jamie Darnell – drums; Patrick Thomas – guitar	none
Band inactive 2000–2001
2001–2002	Bobby Tench – vocals, guitar; Dave Colwell – guitar, mandolin; Greg Ridley – bass, vocals; Jerry Shirley – drums, percussion; Zoot Money - keyboards, vocals	Back on Track (2002)
2002	Dave Colwell – guitar, mandolin, vocals; Greg Ridley – bass, vocals; Jerry Shirley – drums, percussion; Johnny Warman – vocals, guitar; Dean Rees – keyboards	none
Band inactive 2002–2018
2018–2019	Jerry Shirley – drums, percussion (not touring); Dave Colwell – guitar; Jimmy Kunes – vocals; James Volpe Rotondi – guitar, vocals, keyboards; Ivan "Funkboy" Bodley – bass; Bobby Marks – drums	none
2022–present	Jerry Shirley – drums, percussion (not touring); Dave Colwell – guitar; Ivan "Funkboy" Bodley – bass; Bobby Marks – drums; Jim Stapley – vocals, guitar, keyboards, harmonica	
