= Breaker-Breaker =

Single by Outlaws

from the album Lady in Waiting
- Released: 1976
- Genre: Southern rock, country rock
- Length: 2:55
- Label: Arista
- Songwriter(s): Hughie Thomasson
- Producer(s): Paul A. Rothchild

Outlaws singles chronology
"There Goes Another Love Song" (1975)	"Breaker-Breaker" (1976)	"Hurry Sundown" (1977)

"Breaker-Breaker" is a song by the American Southern rock band Outlaws. Written by Hughie Thomasson it is the opening track and lead single from the band's 1976 album Lady in Waiting. It peaked at number 94 on the Billboard Hot 100 and peaked at #19 in July 1976 in the Netherlands. The lyrics capitalize on the 1970s CB radio fad. Brett Adams of Allmusic called it "bright, easygoing country-rock".

== Track listing ==
7" Vinyl

1. "Breaker - Breaker" (Thomasson) 2:55
2. "South Carolina" (Henry Paul) 3:04

== Personnel ==
- Hughie Thomasson - lead guitar, vocals
- Billy Jones - lead guitar, vocals
- Monte Yoho - drums
- Frank O'Keefe - bass guitar
- Henry Paul - electric and acoustic guitar, vocals

== Chart performance ==
Chart (1976)	Peak position
U.S. Billboard Hot 100	94
Canada RPM	77
