= Playin' to Win =

Studio album by Outlaws
- Released: October 1978
- Recorded: Studio One, Doraville, Georgia
- Length: 34:27
- Label: Arista
- Producer: Robert John "Mutt" Lange

Outlaws chronology
Bring It Back Alive (1978)	Playin' to Win (1978)	In the Eye of the Storm (1979)

Professional ratings
Review scores
Source	Rating
Allmusic	2.5/5 stars

Playin' to Win is the fourth album by American southern rock band Outlaws, released in 1978. The album was their first studio project with guitarist/singer/songwriter Freddie Salem. Salem had replaced founding member/guitarist/singer/songwriter Henry Paul, who had acted as the second frontman behind Hughie Thomasson. It was not as well-received as their previous three albums. Notwithstanding, it still featured half of the original lineup, which would remain until the departure of guitarist Billy Jones in 1981.

== Track listing ==
1. "Take It Any Way You Want It" (Billy Jones, Hughie Thomasson) – 3:15
2. "Cry Some More" (Jones, Thomasson) – 3:40
3. "You Are the Show" (Thomasson) – 4:56
4. "You Can Have It" (Harvey Dalton Arnold) – 3:04
5. "If Dreams Came True" (Jones, Robert John "Mutt" Lange) – 2:48
6. "A Real Good Feelin'" (Jones) – 4:30
7. "Love at First Sight" (Thomasson) – 2:45
8. "Falling Rain" (Freddie Salem) – 4:09
9. "Dirty City" (Iain Sutherland) – 5:27

== Personnel ==
- Billy Jones - electric guitar, vocals
- Hughie Thomasson - acoustic, electric, and pedal steel guitars; banjo; vocals
- Freddie Salem - electric guitar, slide guitar, vocals
- Mike Duke - keyboards
- Harvey Dalton Arnold - bass, guitar, vocals
- David Dix - drums, percussion, congas
- Monte Yoho - drums, percussion

Production

- Producer: Robert John "Mutt" Lange
- Engineer: Rodney Mills
- Arranger: Robert John "Mutt" Lange
- Art Direction: Ron Kellum
- Design: Gerard Huerta, Ron Kellum
- Photography: John Barrett

== Charts ==
Album

Year	Chart	Position
1978	Pop Albums	60
1978	Canada	65
