= Lady in Waiting (album) =

Studio album by Outlaws
- Released: May 1976
- Recorded: December 1975 – January 1976
- Studio: Criteria Recording Studios, Miami, FL
- Length: 37:33
- Label: Arista
- Producer: Paul Rothchild

Outlaws chronology
Outlaws (1975)	Lady in Waiting (1976)	Hurry Sundown (1977)

Professional ratings
Review scores
Source	Rating
Allmusic	3/5 stars

Lady in Waiting is the second studio album by American southern rock band Outlaws, released in 1976. (See 1976 in music) The album is known for featuring a cover version of "Freeborn Man" (previously recorded by Keith Allison and Paul Revere & the Raiders), which the band popularized and which eventually became a concert favorite. Henry Paul provides lead vocals on the studio track, but Harvey Dalton Arnold, who would join the band for their next studio album, would handle the lead vocal after Paul's departure. It was eventually included on the 1978 live album Bring It Back Alive, with Arnold on vocals.

== Music ==
The songs on Lady in Waiting encompass elements of rock and roll, country, country rock, pop rock, rockabilly, pop jazz and hard rock.

== Track listing ==
Side one
No.	Title	Writer(s)	Length
1.	"Breaker-Breaker"	Hughie Thomasson	2:59
2.	"South Carolina"	Henry Paul	3:05
3.	"Ain't So Bad"	Billy Jones	3:48
4.	"Freeborn Man"	Keith Allison, Mark Lindsay	4:51
5.	"Girl from Ohio"	Paul	5:02

Side two
No.	Title	Writer(s)	Length
1.	"Lover Boy"	Thomasson	3:58
2.	"Just for You"	Thomasson	3:17
3.	"Prisoner"	Jones	3:58
4.	"Stick Around for Rock & Roll"	Thomasson	6:35
Total length:			37:33

== Personnel ==
- Billy Jones – guitar, vocals
- Frank O'Keefe – bass
- Henry Paul – electric guitar, acoustic guitar, vocals
- Hughie Thomasson – guitar, vocals
- Monte Yoho – drums

Guest

- Joe Lala – percussion

== Charts ==
Chart (1976)	Peak position
US Billboard Top LPs & Tape	36
Canada RPM	51
