= Hittin' the Road (Outlaws album) =

Live album by Outlaws
- Released: November 9, 1993
- Length: 63:39
- Label: Shrapnel
- Producer: Hughie Thomasson

Outlaws chronology
Soldiers of Fortune (1986)	Hittin' the Road (1993)	Diablo Canyon (1994)

Professional ratings
Review scores
Source	Rating
Allmusic	3.5/5 stars

Hittin' the Road is a live album by American southern rock band Outlaws, released in 1993. (See 1993 in music).

== Track listing ==
1. "Hittin' the Road" (Thomasson) – 4:54
2. "There Goes Another Love Song" (Thomasson, Yoho) – 4:02
3. "Hurry Sundown" (Thomasson) – 4:19
4. "Waterhole" (Jones, Paul, Thomasson, Yoho) – 2:47
5. "Hitman Blues" (Traditional) – 8:43
6. "Evil, Wicked, Mean and Nasty" (Salem, Thomasson) – 8:06
7. "You Are the Show" (Thomasson) – 7:08
8. "Superficial Love" (Hicks) – 4:59
9. "(Ghost) Riders in the Sky" (Stan Jones) – 6:20
10. "Green Grass and High Tides" (Thomasson) – 12:21

== Personnel ==
- B.B. Borden - drums
- Jeff Howell - bass guitar, vocals
- Hughie Thomasson - guitar, vocals
- Chris Hicks - guitar
- Timothy Cabe - guitar

== Production ==
- Producer: Hughie Thomasson
- Engineers: Steve Forney, Jeffrey Riedmiller, Steve Lowney, Bob Rivers
- Mixing: Steve Forney, The Outlaws, Hughie Thomasson
- Assistant engineers: David Kingsley, Howell Luther
- Arranger: Hughie Thomasson
