= Hurry Sundown (Outlaws album) =

Studio album by Outlaws
- Released: May 1977
- Recorded: Criteria Sound
- Genre: Southern rock
- Length: 38:01
- Label: Arista
- Producer: Ed Mashal, Bill Szymczyk

Outlaws chronology
Lady in Waiting (1976)	Hurry Sundown (1977)	Bring It Back Alive (1978)

Professional ratings
Review scores
Source	Rating
AllMusic	3/5 stars

Hurry Sundown is the third studio album by American southern rock band Outlaws, released in 1977. The title track became a concert staple and fan favorite. Four members of the band, Hughie Thomasson, Henry Paul, Billy Jones, and Harvey Dalton Arnold (who replaced Frank O'Keefe on bass) contributed songwriting and lead vocals. Paul would leave the band after the album's release.

Thomasson plays pedal steel on some tracks, and banjo on the bluegrass track "So Afraid".

The album was produced by Bill Szymczyk and Ed Mashal, and it was released through Arista Records.

== Track listing ==
Side one
No.	Title	Writer(s)	Length
1.	"Gunsmoke"	Henry Paul, Monte Yoho	4:18
2.	"Hearin' My Heart Talkin'"	Tim Martin, Walter Meskell	4:11
3.	"So Afraid"	Harvey Dalton Arnold	3:17
4.	"Holiday"	Billy Jones	4:02
5.	"Hurry Sundown"	Hughie Thomasson	4:05

Side two
No.	Title	Writer(s)	Length
1.	"Cold and Lonesome"	Arnold	3:19
2.	"Night Wines"	Jones	4:50
3.	"Heavenly Blues"	Paul (Note: Per BMI records (see BMI Work #550628). Some copies of the album credit Billy Jones instead.)	3:47
4.	"Man of the Hour"	Jones, Thomasson	6:12

== Personnel ==
- Harvey Dalton Arnold - bass, guitar, vocals
- Billy Jones - electric guitar, vocals
- Henry Paul - guitar, vocals
- Hughie Thomasson - acoustic, electric, and pedal steel guitars; banjo; vocals
- Monte Yoho - drums

Guests

- Manual Labour - percussion
- Joe Vitale - ARP synthesizer, strings

Production

- Ed Mashal - producer, engineer
- Bill Szymczyk - producer, engineer

== Charts ==
Chart (1977)	Peak position
US Billboard Top LPs & Tape	51
