= In the Eye of the Storm (Outlaws album) =

Studio album by Outlaws
- Released: October 1979
- Length: 33:40
- Label: Arista
- Producer: Johnny Sandlin

Outlaws chronology
Playin' to Win (1978)	In the Eye of the Storm (1979)	Ghost Riders (1980)

Professional ratings
Review scores
Source	Rating
AllMusic	2/5 stars

In the Eye of the Storm is the fifth album by American southern rock band Outlaws, released in 1979. It is the last album with bassist Harvey Dalton Arnold. Monte Yoho would soon leave the band but return for future releases.

== Track listing ==
Side 1

1. "Lights Are On (But Nobody's Home)" (Darryl Rhoades) – 3:29
2. "Long Gone" (Salem) – 4:30
3. "It's All Right" (Thomasson) – 3:41
4. "Miracle Man" (Elvis Costello) – 3:46
5. "Comin' Home" (Jones) – 4:09

Side 2

1. "Blueswater" (Jones) – 3:07
2. "(Com' On) Dance with Me" (Arnold, Jones, Thomasson) – 2:39
3. "Too Long Without Her" (Thomasson) – 4:54
4. "I'll Be Leaving Soon" (Jones) – 4:43

== Personnel ==
- Harvey Dalton Arnold – bass, vocals
- David Dix – percussion, drums
- Billy Jones – guitar, vocals
- Freddie Salem – guitar, vocals
- Hughie Thomasson – guitar, vocals
- Monte Yoho – drums

Production

- Producer: Johnny Sandlin
- Mastering Engineer: George Marino
- Engineer: David Gottlieb
- Recorded at Quadradial Cinema Recording Studios, North Miami, Florida

== Charts ==
Chart (1979)	Peak position
Billboard Top LPs & Tape	55
