= Bring It Back Alive =

Live album by Outlaws
- Released: February 1978
- Recorded: September 9–November 13, 1977
- Length: 74:40
- Label: Arista
- Producer: Allan Blazek, Bill Szymczyk

Outlaws chronology
Hurry Sundown (1977)	Bring It Back Alive (1978)	Playin' to Win (1978)

Professional ratings
Review scores
Source	Rating
Allmusic	2.5/5 stars

Bring It Back Alive is a live album by American southern rock band Outlaws, released in 1978. It was released as a double album, and later re-released as a single CD. The album is best known for the twenty minute-long rendition of the song "Green Grass and High Tides" from the band's debut album.

Due to a printing mistake, early copies of the 8-track & cassette versions had the title Bring 'Em Back Alive. Although the cover of the vinyl version used the album's proper title (Bring It Back Alive), the labels on all four sides read Bring 'Em Back Alive as well.

== Track listing ==
1. "Intro [Relay Breakdown]" – 1:06
2. "Stick Around for Rock & Roll" (Thomasson) – 9:10
3. "Lover Boy" (Thomasson) – 4:11
4. "There Goes Another Love Song" (Thomasson, Yoho) – 4:19
5. "Freeborn Man" (Allison, Lindsay) – 5:48
6. "Prisoner" (Jones) – 7:17
7. "I Hope You Don't Mind" (Salem) – 5:31
8. "Song for You" (Jones, Thomasson) – 4:01
9. "Cold and Lonesome" (Arnold) – 3:43
10. "Holiday" (Jones) – 4:49
11. "Hurry Sundown" (Thomasson) – 4:15
12. "Green Grass and High Tides" (Thomasson) – 20:41

== Personnel ==
- Harvey Dalton Arnold - bass, guitar, vocals
- David Dix - percussion, drums
- Billy Jones - guitar, vocals
- Freddie Salem - guitar, vocals
- Hughie Thomasson - guitar, vocals
- Monte Yoho - percussion, drums

== Production ==
- Producers: Allan Blazek, Bill Szymczyk
- Executive producer: Bill Szymczyk
- Engineers: Ross Alexander, Alex Clark, Joseph Foglia, Kelly Kotera, Rick Sanchez, Peter Yanos
- Assistant engineer: Eric Schilling
- Mixing: Allan Blazek
- Digital remastering: Bill Inglot, Ken Perry
- Art direction: Ron Kellum
- Design: Ron Kellum
- Special effects photography: John Barrett

== Charts ==
Album

Year	Chart	Position
1978	Pop Albums	29
1978	Canada	46

Singles

Year	Single	Chart	Position
1977	"Hurry Sundown"	Pop Singles	60
