= Vicious Cycle (album) =

Studio album by Lynyrd Skynyrd
- Released: May 20, 2003
- Recorded: November 2002 – January 2003
- Studio: Cartee Day Studios
- Genre: Southern rock; blues rock; country rock; heavy metal; hard rock; AOR
- Length: 70:40
- Label: Sanctuary
- Producer: Ben Fowler and Lynyrd Skynyrd

Lynyrd Skynyrd chronology
Then and Now (2000)	Vicious Cycle (2003)	Lynyrd Skynyrd Lyve: The Vicious Cycle Tour (2003)

Vicious Cycle is the twelfth studio album by Lynyrd Skynyrd, released in 2003. It was the first album recorded by the band following the death of original bassist Leon Wilkeson, who appears on two songs, "The Way" and "Lucky Man", and the song "Mad Hatter" is a tribute to him. The album is the first to feature bassist Ean Evans, the first mainstream album with Michael Cartellone on drums (who had previously appeared on Christmas Time Again), and the last album that guitarist Hughie Thomasson played on before he died. It included the single "Red, White & Blue" which peaked at number 27 on the US Mainstream Rock charts.

Professional ratings
Review scores
Source	Rating
AllMusic	4/5 stars
Rolling Stone	1/5 stars

== Track listing ==
1. "That's How I Like It" (Blair Daly, Rickey Medlocke, Gary Rossington, Hughie Thomasson, Johnny Van Zant) – 4:33
2. "Pick Em Up" (Tom Hambridge, Medlocke, J. Van Zant) – 4:20
3. "Dead Man Walkin'" (Kevin Bowe, Medlocke, Rossington, Thomasson, J. Van Zant) – 4:30
4. "The Way" (Medlocke, Rossington, Thomasson, J. Van Zant) – 5:32
5. "Red, White, & Blue" (Donnie Van Zant, J. Van Zant, Brad Warren, Brett Warren) – 5:31
6. "Sweet Mama" (Hambridge, D. Van Zant, Robert White Johnson) – 3:59
7. "All Funked Up" (Medlocke, Jim Peterik, Rossington, Thomasson, J. Van Zant) – 3:33
8. "Hell or Heaven" (Medlocke, Peterik, Rossington, Thomasson, J. Van Zant) – 5:14
9. "Mad Hatter" (Hambridge, Medlocke, Rossington, Thomasson, J. Van Zant, Cartellone, Evans, Powell, Chase, Krantz) – 5:38
10. "Rockin' Little Town" (Hambridge, Medlocke, Rossington, Thomasson, J. Van Zant) – 3:36
11. "Crawl" (Medlocke, Peterik, Rossington, Thomasson, J. Van Zant) – 5:09
12. "Jake" (Hambridge, Medlocke, Rossington, Thomasson, J. Van Zant) – 3:41
13. "Life's Lessons" (Medlocke, Peterik, Rossington, Thomasson, J. Van Zant) – 5:59
14. "Lucky Man" (Medlocke, Rossington, Thomasson, J. Van Zant) – 5:35
15. "Gimme Back My Bullets" (Bonus Track featuring Kid Rock) (Rossington, Ronnie Van Zant) – 3:41

== Personnel ==
Lynyrd Skynyrd

- Gary Rossington – guitars
- Billy Powell – keyboards
- Ean Evans – bass guitar
- Michael Cartellone – drums
- Rickey Medlocke – guitars & vocals, co-lead vocals on "Pick Em Up", harmonica
- Hughie Thomasson – guitars & background vocals
- Leon Wilkeson – bass guitar on "The Way" and "Lucky Man"
- Johnny Van Zant – lead vocals, harmonica
- Dale Krantz-Rossington – background vocals
- Carol Chase – background vocals

Additional personnel

- Perry Coleman – backing vocals
- Melody Crittendon – backing vocals
- Eric Darken – percussion
- Chris Dunn – trombone
- Tom Hambridge – backing vocals
- John Hobbs – organ, piano
- Jim Horn – baritone saxophone
- Sam Levine – tenor saxophone
- Greg Morrow – drums
- Gordon Mote – organ
- Nashville String Machine – strings
- Steve Patrick – trumpet
- Kid Rock – co-lead vocals on "Gimme Back My Bullets"
- Brent Rowan – tiple
- Brad Warren – backing vocals
- Brett Warren – backing vocals
- Biff Watson – bouzouki, acoustic guitar

== Charts ==
Chart (2003)	Peak position
Finnish Albums (Suomen virallinen lista)	30
French Albums (SNEP)	150
German Albums (Offizielle Top 100)	44
UK Independent Albums (OCC)	47
UK Rock & Metal Albums (OCC)	39
US Billboard 200	30
