= Soldiers of Fortune (album) =

Studio album by Outlaws
- Released: September 1986
- Genre: Southern rock; hard rock; blues rock; synth rock; AOR
- Length: 42:32
- Label: Pasha
- Producer: Randy Bishop, Spencer Proffer

Outlaws chronology
Los Hombres Malo (1982)	Soldiers of Fortune (1986)	Hittin' the Road (1993)

Professional ratings
Review scores
Source	Rating
AllMusic	3/5 stars
Kerrang!	3.5/5 stars

Soldiers of Fortune is the eighth studio album by American southern rock band Outlaws, released in 1986 (See 1986 in music), and the first with original guitarist Henry Paul since 1977's Hurry Sundown. A video was shot for "One Last Ride", but the album sold poorly.

== Track listing ==
1. "One Last Ride" (Randy Bishop, Chuck Glass) – 4:26
2. "Soldiers of Fortune" (R. Bishop, L.C. Cohen, Henry Paul, Hughie Thomasson, Alan Walden) – 3:32
3. "The Night Cries" (R. Bishop, Cohen, Paul, Thomasson) – 4:36
4. "The Outlaw" (Duane Evans, Steve Grisham, Paul) – 3:49
5. "Cold Harbor" (Glass, Paul) – 4:26
6. "Whatcha Don't Do" (Thomasson, Paul, John Townsend) – 3:50
7. "Just the Way I Like It" (Spencer Proffer, Billy Thorpe) – 4:02
8. "Saved by the Bell" (R. Bishop, Jon Butcher) – 3:56
9. "Lady Luck" (Evans, Grisham, Paul) – 3:52
10. "Racin' for the Red Light" (Bishop, Freddie Salem, Thomasson) – 6:03

== Personnel ==
=== Band members ===
- Henry Paul - guitar, vocals, background vocals
- Hughie Thomasson - guitar, vocals, background vocals
- Steve Grisham - guitar, vocals, background vocals
- Chuck Glass - bass, keyboards, vocals, background vocals
- David Dix - percussion, drums

=== Additional musicians ===
- Randy Bishop - keyboards, programming, backing vocals
- Jon Butcher, Bart Bishop, John Townsend, Stacey Lyn Shaffer - backing vocals
- Buster McNeil - guitar, backing vocals
- Jimmy Glenn - drums

== Production ==
- Producer: Randy Bishop
- Executive producer: Spencer Proffer
- Engineer: Hanspeter Huber

== Charts ==
Album

Year	Chart	Position
1986	The Billboard 200	160
