= It's About Pride =

Studio album by Outlaws
- Released: 2012
- Length: 57:26
- Label: Mirror Lake Records
- Producer: Michael Bush & Henry Paul

Outlaws chronology
Diablo Canyon (1994)	It's About Pride (2012)	Dixie Highway (2020)

It's About Pride is the tenth album by American southern rock band Outlaws, released on September 25, 2012. (See 2012 in music).→"It's About Pride" was re-issued by Purple Pyramid Records in 2023 with an updated background to the Original Album Artwork, giving it a 'Desert Storm Vista' appearance.

== Track listing ==
1. "Tomorrow's Another Night" (H. Paul) – 4:18
2. "Hidin' Out in Tennessee" (H. Paul, B. Crain) – 4:07
3. "It's About Pride" (H. Paul) – 7:10
4. "Born To Be Bad" (B. Crain, H. Paul) – 5:19
5. "Last Ghost Town" (B. Crain) – 3:34
6. "Nothin' Main About Main Street" (H. Paul, B. Crain, T. Hambridge) – 5:35
7. "The Flame" (B. Crain, H. Paul, C. Anderson) – 4:29
8. "Trail of Tears" (C. Anderson) – 3:47
9. "Right Where I Belong" (B. Crain, H. Paul, D. Robbins) – 4:15
10. "Alex's Song" (H. Paul, B. Crain) – 3:38
11. "Trouble Rides A Fast Horse" (H. Paul, B. Crain, M. Curb) – 5:22
12. "So Long" (H. Paul) – 5:52

== Personnel ==
- Henry Paul – guitars, lead vocals
- Monte Yoho – drums
- Billy Crain – guitars, harmony vocals
- Chris Anderson – guitars, lead and harmony vocals
- Randy Threet – bass, lead and harmony vocals
- Dave Robbins – keyboards, harmony vocals

=== Additional Musicians ===
- Joe Lala – percussion

== Production ==
- Producers: Michael Bush & Henry Paul
- Engineers: Jesse Poe, Michael Bush
- Mixing: Michael Bush
- Design: Good & Evil Design
- Photo: John Gellman
