= Monte Yoho =

- Born: March 26, 1952 (age 74); Lakeland, Florida, U.S.
- Genres: Country, southern rock
- Occupations: Drummer, songwriter
- Instrument: Drums
- Years active: 1967—present
- Formerly of: Outlaws

Bryon Lamont "Monte" Yoho (born March 26, 1952) is an American southern rock and country musician. He is best known as being a member of Outlaws and Blackhawk.

== Early life ==
Yoho was born on March 26, 1952, in Lakeland, Florida. In 1965, when he was 13 years old, Yoho learned how to play the drums. Also in junior high school, he met future bandmate Hughie Thomasson and the two became close friends. Yoho and Thomasson later attended A.P. Leto High School in Tampa, Florida. In addition, Yoho was hired as a session musician in the late 1960s by the Darby, Florida-based band The Bellamy Brothers.

In 1969, Yoho met Billy Jones while hitchhiking back from the Atlanta Pop Festival. He had heard of Jones as a musician also living in the Tampa Bay area. While in the car, they discussed forming a band upon return to Tampa. The result was The Dave Graham Group, with Jones and Dave Graham on guitar, Roy Holly on bass, and Yoho on drums. The quartet frequently collaborated with Thomasson-led band known as The Outlaws.

== The Outlaws ==
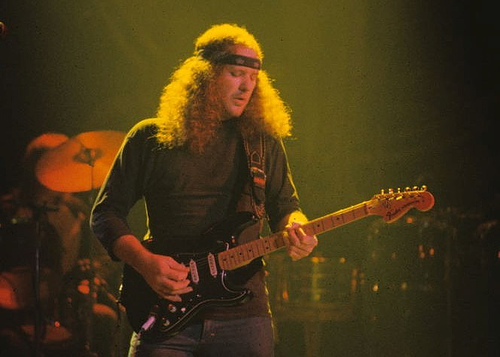
Hughie Thomasson at an Outlaws concert in the 1970s . Yoho can be seen in the background behind the drums.

After several lineup changes and a breakup, Thomasson decided to reform The Outlaws in 1972. Thomasson became the lead vocalist and one of the three guitarists, Tampa folk singer Henry Paul joined as another guitarist, and Frank O'Keefe was the bassist. Jones was originally to play drums for the newest incarnation of the band. However, Thomasson was impressed by the Allman Brothers Band's usage of two lead guitarists and convinced Jones to occupy the third guitar slot. Yoho thus became the band's drummer.

The Outlaws developed a loyal following as they performed in many bars and clubs in the Tampa Bay area. While playing on a hillside for 2,000 college students in 1974, Charlie Brusco "discovered" the band and agreed to be their manager.

== Discography ==
=== Studio albums ===
With The Outlaws

- Outlaws (1975)
- Lady in Waiting (1976)
- Hurry Sundown (1977)
- Playin' to Win (1978)
- In the Eye of the Storm (1979)
- It's About Pride (2012)

With The Henry Paul Band

- Grey Ghost (1979)
- Feel the Heat (1980)
- Anytime (1981)

With BlackHawk

- For the Sake of the Song (2009)

=== Live albums ===
With The Outlaws

- Bring It Back Alive (1978)

== Bibliography ==
- Brant, Marley (1999). Southern Rockers: the Roots and Legacy of Southern Rock. New York: Billboard Books.
