= Los Hombres Malo =

Studio album by Outlaws
- Released: March 1982
- Length: 39:32
- Label: Arista
- Producer: Gary Lyons

Outlaws chronology
Ghost Riders (1980)	Los Hombres Malo (1982)	Soldiers of Fortune (1986)

Professional ratings
Review scores
Source	Rating
AllMusic	2/5 stars

Los Hombres Malo is the seventh studio album by American rock band Outlaws. It was released in 1982 on Arista Records. It is the first album without songwriter/guitarist Billy Jones.

== Music ==
The songs on Los Hombres Malo incorporate elements of hard rock, album-oriented rock, pop and country pop.

== Track listing ==
1. "Don't Stop" (Salem) – 5:03
2. "Foxtail Lilly" (Thomasson) – 4:32
3. "Rebel Girl" (Peterik, Smith) – 4:27
4. "Goodbye" (Salem) – 4:29
5. "Back from Eternity" (Thomasson) – 4:30
6. "Won't Come Out of the Rain" (Cua, Cua, DeRollo, Lyons) – 4:03
7. "Running" (Russo) – 4:25
8. "Easy Does It" (Cua, DeRollo) – 3:32
9. "All Roads" (Hagar, Peterik) – 4:31

== Personnel ==
- Rick Cua – bass, vocals, backing vocals
- David Dix – percussion, drums
- Gary Lyons – keyboards, vocals, backing vocals
- Freddie Salem – guitar, vocals, backing vocals
- Hughie Thomasson – banjo, guitar, vocals, backing vocals

Guests

- Dave Lane – fiddle, violin
- Carol Bristow – vocals, backing vocals
- Lu Moss – vocals, backing vocals

Production

- Producer: Gary Lyons
- Engineers: Gary Lyons, Pete Thea
- Assistant engineer: Les Horn, Phil Bonanno
- Mastering: George Marino
- Art direction: Neal Pozner
- Design: Neal Pozner
- Cover illustration: Bob Peak

== Charts ==
Album

Year	Chart	Position
1982	Pop Albums	77
