= Ghost Riders (Outlaws album) =

Studio album by Outlaws
- Released: November 22, 1980
- Recorded: Mediasound, New York City; Bayshore Recording, Miami, Florida; Record Plant, Los Angeles
- Genre: Hard rock
- Length: 39:39
- Label: Arista
- Producer: Gary Lyons, Hughie Thomasson, Billy Jones

Outlaws chronology
In the Eye of the Storm (1979)	Ghost Riders (1980)	Los Hombres Malo (1982)

Professional ratings
Review scores
Source	Rating
AllMusic	3/5 stars

Ghost Riders is the sixth studio album by American rock band Outlaws, released on November 22, 1980, through Arista Records. The album lacks the country music influence of the band's previous recordings, instead emphasizing hard rock.

Ghost Riders sparked a comeback after the mediocre sales of prior albums. Their cover of "(Ghost) Riders In the Sky" was one of their most successful songs earned the band some attention outside southern rock circles. Ghost Riders would be the final Outlaws album for Billy Jones, who would be asked to leave the band after its release.

== Track listing ==
1. "(Ghost) Riders in the Sky" (Stan Jones) – 5:52
2. "White Horses" (Salem) – 3:53
3. "Angels Hide" (Thomasson) – 5:45
4. "Devil's Road" (Salem) – 4:50
5. "I Can't Stop Loving You" (Nicholls) – 4:21
6. "Wishing Wells" (Thomasson) – 3:35
7. "Sunshine" (Duke, Jones) – 5:38
8. "Freedom Walk" (Jones) – 5:45

== Personnel ==
- Rick Cua – bass, guitar, vocals
- David Dix – percussion, drums
- Billy Jones – guitar, vocals
- Mike Duke – keyboards, vocals
- Freddie Salem – guitar, vocals
- Hughie Thomasson – guitar, vocals

== Charts ==
Album

Year	Chart	Position
1981	Pop Albums	25
1981	Canada	12

Singles

Year	Single	Chart	Position
1981	"(Ghost) Riders in the Sky"	Top Rock Tracks	15
1981	"(Ghost) Riders in the Sky"	Hot 100	31
