= This Is the Way =

This Is the Way may refer to:

- This Is the Way (album), by The Rossington-Collins Band
- "This Is the Way" (Dannii Minogue song), 1993
- "This Is the Way" (E-Type song), 1994
- "This Is the Way" (feat. DMX) (Five Finger Death Punch song), 2024
- "Here We Go Round the Mulberry Bush" or "This Is the Way", a children's nursery rhyme
- "This Is the Way", a philosophy of The Mandalorian
