= Outlaws (Outlaws album) =

Studio album by Outlaws
- Released: July 1975
- Recorded: March 1975
- Studio: Elektra, Los Angeles, California
- Genre: Southern rock
- Length: 41:15
- Label: Arista
- Producer: Paul A. Rothchild

Outlaws chronology
Outlaws (1975)	Lady in Waiting (1976)

Singles from Outlaws
- 1. "There Goes Another Love Song" Released: 1975

Professional ratings
Review scores
Source	Rating
AllMusic	4/5 stars
Christgau's Record Guide	C−

Outlaws is the debut studio album by American southern rock band Outlaws, released in 1975. The album is known for the rock classic "Green Grass and High Tides", which is considered by many to be one of the greatest guitar songs, plus the hit single "There Goes Another Love Song".

Drawing influences from southern rock bands the Allman Brothers Band and Lynyrd Skynyrd, as well as folk rock and country rock bands such as the Byrds, Poco, Eagles, and New Riders of the Purple Sage, the band developed a unique, hard-driving country rock sound, due in part to the fast picking, quasi-country style guitar playing of Hughie Thomasson, coupled with their use of three and four part harmonies and incorporation of elements of bluegrass music.

The band was also notable for featuring three different front men: Thomasson, Henry Paul, and Billy Jones, all of whom wrote and provided lead vocals. Paul's vocals and his self-penned tracks "Song in the Breeze", "Stay with Me" and "Knoxville Girl" brought a strong country flavor to the album, while Jones teamed with Thomasson to provide a hard driving Southern Rock guitar sound focused on dueling guitar lines.

The album, with its blend of Southern rock, country rock and hard rock, was well received by critics, and also helped the band become a huge concert draw. It peaked at number 13 on the Billboard Top LPs & Tape chart.

== Track listing ==
Side one
No.	Title	Writer(s)	Lead vocals	Length
1.	"There Goes Another Love Song"	Hughie Thomasson, Monte Yoho	Thomasson	3:04
2.	"Song for You"	Thomasson	Thomasson	3:34
3.	"Song in the Breeze"	Henry Paul	Paul	3:07
4.	"It Follows from Your Heart"	Billy Jones	Jones	5:22
5.	"Cry No More"	Jones	Jones	4:21

Side two
No.	Title	Writer(s)	Lead vocals	Length
1.	"Waterhole"	Outlaws	Instrumental	2:06
2.	"Stay With Me"	Paul	Paul	3:32
3.	"Keep Prayin'"	Frank O'Keefe	Paul and Jones	2:46
4.	"Knoxville Girl"	Paul	Paul	3:32
5.	"Green Grass and High Tides"	Thomasson	Thomasson	9:46
Total length:				41:15

== Personnel ==
Outlaws

- Hughie Thomasson – lead guitar, vocals
- Billy Jones – lead guitar, vocals
- Monte Yoho – drums
- Frank O'Keefe – bass guitar
- Henry Paul – electric and acoustic guitars, vocals

Others

- JD Souther – harmonies on "It Follows From Your Heart"

== Charts ==
Chart (1975)	Peak position
Billboard Top LPs & Tape	13
Canada RPM	48

Singles

Year	Single	Chart	Position
1975	"There Goes Another Love Song"	Billboard Hot 100	34
