= Don't Stop Me Now (disambiguation) =

"Don't Stop Me Now" is a 1978 song by Queen.

Don't Stop Me Now may also refer to:

== Film and television ==
- Don't Stop Me Now (TV series), a talent show broadcast on Sky1
- Don't Stop Me Now (film), a 2019 Italian comedy film

== Music ==
- Don't Stop Me Now!, 1967 studio album by Cliff Richard
- "Don't Stop Me Now", a song by the Rossington Collins Band from the 1981 album This is the Way
- "Don't Stop Me Now", a song by Status Quo from the 1981 album Never Too Late
- "Don't Stop Me Now", a song by Toto from the 1986 album Fahrenheit
- "Don't Stop Me Now", a 2019 single by First Ladies of Disco

== Other uses ==
- Don't Stop Me Now!!, a 2007 book by Jeremy Clarkson
- "Don't Stop Me Now", a storyline in the science fiction comedy webtoon series Live with Yourself!
