= Anytime, Anyplace, Anywhere =

Studio album by Rossington Collins Band
- Released: July 1980
- Genre: Southern rock
- Length: 46:31
- Label: MCA
- Producers: Allen Collins, Barry Harwood, Gary Rossington

Rossington Collins Band chronology
Anytime, Anyplace, Anywhere (1980)	This Is the Way (1981)

Professional ratings
Review scores
Source	Rating
Allmusic	3/5 stars

Anytime, Anyplace, Anywhere is the first studio album by the Rossington Collins Band. It includes their most successful single, "Don't Misunderstand Me". It was recorded at (the now defunct) El Adobe Studios in El Paso, Texas.

== Track listing ==
1. "Prime Time" (Collins, Rossington, Krantz) – 4:06
2. "Three Times as Bad" (Collins, Krantz) – 6:04
3. "Don't Misunderstand Me" (Collins, Harwood, Krantz) – 3:58
4. "One Good Man" (Collins, Rossington, Krantz) – 4:40
5. "Opportunity" (Powell, Harwood, Krantz) – 4:34
6. "Getaway" (Powell, Krantz, Harwood) – 7:26
7. "Winners and Losers" (Rossington, Collins) – 5:10
8. "Misery Loves Company" (Rossington, Krantz) – 4:49
9. "Sometimes You Can Put It Out" (Harwood, Krantz, Rossington) – 5:44

== Personnel ==
- Allen Collins - lead & rhythm guitars
- Barry Lee Harwood - lead & rhythm guitars, slide guitar, vocals
- Derek Hess - drums, percussion
- Dale Krantz - lead vocals
- Billy Powell - keyboards
- Gary Rossington - lead & rhythm guitars, slide guitar
- Leon Wilkeson - bass guitar
- Howard Steele - engineer, mixer
- Dave Evans - mixer

== Reception ==
Writing in The Boston Phoenix, Barry Hoberman opined that "Throughout Anytime, Anyplace, Anywhere rhythms interlock sturdily, and melodies curl in and around one another in perfect coordination." Hoberman felt that most of the music "is more gracefully melodic than most Skynyrd material, representing a downshift from the earlier group’s abrupt rhythms and brash metallic fury.

== Charts ==
Chart (1980)	Peak position
Canada Top Albums/CDs (RPM)	34
Norwegian Albums (VG-lista)	32
US Billboard 200	13

== Certifications ==
Region	Certification	Certified units/sales
United States (RIAA)	Gold	500,000^{^}
^{^} Shipments figures based on certification alone.
