= Hittin' the Road =

Hittin' the Road may refer to:

- Hittin' the Road (Outlaws album), 1993
- Hittin' the Road (Ernest Tubb album), 1965
- Hittin' the Road (Chance McKinney album)
