= Diablo Canyon (album) =

Studio album by Outlaws
- Released: May 17th, 1994
- Recorded: 1993–1994
- Length: 52:33
- Label: Blues Bureau International
- Producer: Mike Varney, Steve Fontano, Hughie Thomasson

Outlaws chronology
Hittin' the Road (1993)	Diablo Canyon (1994)	So Low (2000)

Diablo Canyon is an album by the American Southern rock band Outlaws, released in 1994. Hughie Thomasson was the only original member of the band.

"Brother Travis" was written with Ronnie Van Zant.

== Critical reception ==
Professional ratings
Review scores
Source	Rating
AllMusic	3.5/5 stars

The Miami New Times praised the "soaring harmonies and searing guitar solos that refuse to fall into cliche," writing that "Thomasson's vocals sound as potent and full of meaning as ever."

AllMusic wrote that the album "manages to be an impressively lean and rockin' album—cut directly from the unmistakable Southern rock cloth."

== Track listing ==
1. "Diablo Canyon" (Thomasson) – 7:01
2. "Dregs Fall to the Wicked" (Cooper, Thomasson, Tsaerios) – 5:10
3. "Let the Fingers Do the Walkin'" (Thomasson) – 4:49
4. "Steam on the Blacktop" (Kortchmar, Lynch) – 4:49
5. "Macon Blues" (Hicks) – 5:48
6. "New Frontier" (Borden, Hicks, Thomasson, Howell) – 5:20
7. "Brother Travis" (Borden, Hicks, Thomasson, Howell) – 4:58
8. "The Wheel" (Hicks) – 5:20
9. "Freedom in Flight" (Thomasson) – 4:21
10. "Alligator Alley" (Thomasson) – 4:52

== Personnel ==
- Hughie Thomasson – lead guitars, lead vocals
- Chris Hicks – lead guitars, lead vocals
- Jeff Howell – bass, vocals
- B.B. Borden – drums, percussion

=== Additional Musicians ===
- Gary Rossington – guitar, slide guitar
- Billy Powell – piano
- Mickey Mulcahy – guitar
- Mike Varney – guitar
- Willie Morris – background vocals
- Mike Mani – Hammond B-3 organ

== Production ==
- Producers: Steve Fontano, Hughie Thomasson, Mickey Mulcahy
- Executive Producer: Mike Varney
- Engineers: Steve Fontano, Gregg Schnitzer, Wally Walton
- Assistant engineer: Terry Weeks
- Mixing: Steve Fontano, Hughie Thomasson
- Mastering: George Horn
