= There Goes Another Love Song =

Single by Outlaws

from the album Outlaws
- B-side: "Keep Prayin'"
- Released: August 1975
- Genre: Southern rock, country rock
- Length: 3:06
- Label: Arista
- Songwriters: Hughie Thomasson, Monte Yoho
- Producer: Paul A. Rothchild

Outlaws singles chronology
"There Goes Another Love Song" (1975)	"Breaker-Breaker" (1976)

"There Goes Another Love Song" is a song by the American Southern rock band Outlaws. Written by Hughie Thomasson and Monte Yoho, it is the opening track and lead single from the band's 1975 debut album Outlaws. It became a top 40 hit, peaking at number 34 on the Billboard Hot 100, and at number 30 in the Netherlands in November 1975.

== Background and composition ==
The song was written by Hughie Thomasson and Monte Yoho. Thomasson's voice is the one commonly associated with the group because he sang two of the band's most popular songs, "There Goes Another Love Song" and "Green Grass and High Tides".

== Release and reception ==
The song was generally well received by music critics. Ronnie D. Lankford, Jr. of AllMusic called it one of the Outlaws' best songs, while the Associated Press called it a "rock anthem". However, not all reviews were positive. Marley Brant was confused as to why the song was released as a single in the first place, as he thought it was "slightly inconsequential".

"There Goes Another Love Song" was included on the various artists compilation The South's Greatest Hits.

== Track listing ==
7" vinyl

1. "There Goes Another Love Song" (Thomasson, Yoho) – 3:06
2. "Keep Prayin'" (O'Keefe) – 2:46

== Personnel ==
- Hughie Thomasson - lead guitar, vocals
- Billy Jones - lead guitar, vocals
- Monte Yoho - drums
- Frank O'Keefe - bass guitar
- Henry Paul - electric and acoustic guitars, vocals

== Chart performance ==
Chart (1975)	Peak position
Canada RPM	56
Netherlands (Dutch Top 40)	30
Netherlands (Single Top 100)	24
U.S. Billboard Hot 100	34
