= Allen Collins Band =

American musical group

- Origin: Jacksonville, Florida, U.S.
- Genres: Southern rock
- Years active: 1983–1984
- Label: MCA Records
- Spinoff of: Lynyrd Skynyrd; Rossington Collins Band
- Past members: Randall Hall; Allen Collins; Barry Harwood; Leon Wilkeson; Jimmy Dougherty; Billy Powell; Derek Hess; Mike Owings

The Allen Collins Band was an American Southern rock band, and a spinoff of Lynyrd Skynyrd and the Rossington Collins Band. It existed from 1983 to 1984 and was formed shortly after the dissolution of the Rossington-Collins Band.

Most of the members carried over from the Rossington-Collins Band, with the exceptions of Dale Krantz and Gary Rossington, who quit after a row with Collins. The Collins Band's name was originally Horsepower, but just prior to the band's release of its debut album it discovered another band was already using that name. The Allen Collins Band released "Here, There and Back" on MCA in 1983, its only album. Collins was emotionally drained due to the sudden death of his wife, Kathy, and as his behavior became more and more erratic, the band began to disintegrate. Jacksonville guitarist Mike Owings joined The Allen Collins Band in the spring of 1984 and co wrote several unrecorded songs.

Vocalist/guitarist Michael Ray Fitzgerald replaced Owings in early 1985, bringing bassist Phil Price aboard also, but the project completely fell apart at this point (Fitzgerald, Price and Dougherty had already formed Mike Angelo and the Idols, with Dougherty on drums). Dougherty later played drums with St. Augustine alt-country band Gunga Din, later renamed Crabgrass. Keyboardist Billy Powell and bassist Leon Wilkeson worked with Christian-rock band Vision for several years before re-joining a re-formed Lynyrd Skynyrd in 1987. Guitarist Randall Hall, at Collins' insistence, also joined the reconstituted Skynyrd (Collins was at this point paralyzed from an auto accident). Hall later formed the Randall Hall Band and now performs with World Classic Rockers. Drummer Derek Hess lives in Jacksonville and performs regularly with various local bands.

== Band members ==
- Allen Collins - Guitar
- Billy Powell - Keyboards
- Leon Wilkeson - Bass
- Barry Lee Harwood - Guitar & vocals
- Derek Hess - Drums
- Randall Hall - Guitar & vocals
- Jimmy Dougherty - Vocals
- Mike Owings - Guitar & vocals (1984)
- Andy King - Bass & vocals (1984)
- Michael Ray Fitzgerald - Guitar & vocals (1985)
- Phil Price - Bass (1985)
- Steve Reynolds - Drums (1985)
- Rik Yarbrough - Bass

== Discography ==
- Here, There, and Back (MCA 1983)

== Live recordings ==
- "Live at the Lone Star Cafe" November 7, 1983
  - This is the only known live recording of the band.
  - Intermingled with the setlist are a few Lynyrd Skynyrd covers, with the set culminating in what is the final recorded version of "Freebird" with Allen Collins.
