= Ean Evans =

American bassist (1960–2009)

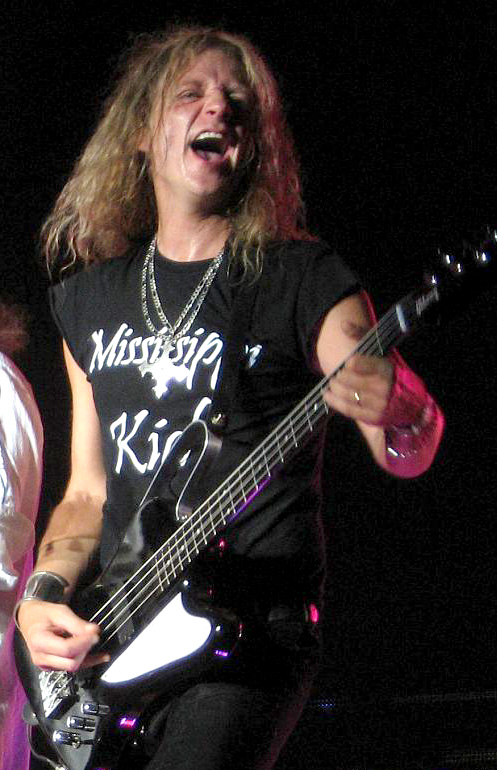
- Evans with Lynyrd Skynyrd in 2008

Background information
- Also known as: Mississippi Kid
- Born: Donald Evans; September 16, 1960; Atlanta, Georgia, U.S.
- Died: May 6, 2009 (aged 48) Columbus, Mississippi, U.S.
- Genres: Southern rock, hard rock
- Occupation: Bassist
- Years active: 1980s–2009
- Formerly of: Outlaws, Humble Pie, Lynyrd Skynyrd

Donald "Ean" Evans (September 16, 1960– May 6, 2009) was an American musician who was the bassist for southern rock band Lynyrd Skynyrd from 2001 until his death. He joined the band following the death of Leon Wilkeson.

== Life and career ==
Evans was born and raised in Atlanta, Georgia. He moved to Columbus, Mississippi after marrying his wife, Eva. He started in music at the age of five, playing trumpet and having an orchestral background until his teen years. Picking up the guitar at 15, he was soon playing the southeastern rock circuit with various cover groups.

A few years later, he switched to bass so as to bring a fellow guitarist into the band. In the 1980s, he played bass for rock band Five Miles High, along with Mike Reynolds (drummer), Reuban Lace (guitarist), Carl Brown (keyboardist) and Del Stockstill (guitar). The group played venues from Georgia to Kentucky and all over the southeast. It was rated in the top 10 rock bands of the 1980s in a Mississippi radio station contest.

Around 1983, FMH disbanded, and Ean returned to his native Atlanta. There, he welcomed his newborn daughter and worked on plans to form a new group with close friend and keyboardist Joey Huffman. This project quickly became the band Babe Blu (with former FMH members Carl Brown, Reuban Lace, and adding JT Williams on drums). Babe Blu immediately become a top draw in Atlanta and on the southeastern club and college circuit. However, in 1987, Ean left Babe Blu permanently to be home with his young family and to work on his own original compositions.

He studied the styles and techniques of John Paul Jones (Led Zeppelin), Geddy Lee (Rush) and Leon Wilkeson (Lynyrd Skynyrd), giving him an aggressive approach to the bass guitar.

In 1988, he was picked up by his then personal manager, Jay Jay French of the then recently disbanded Twisted Sister. Evans formed his first original band, Cupid's Arrow. They became quite popular in the Atlanta area. After composing and recording over 50 songs, Ean became a full-time studio musician.

It was during this time he was called to join the Outlaws by leader Hughie Thomasson, who showed him worldwide touring experience. The Outlaws stopped touring when Hughie was called to join Lynyrd Skynyrd.

In 1997, Evans and ex-Halloween guitarist Rick Craig (1982–1988, 1997–2000) formed Noon, which blended metal with southern rock. They released one album in 2002 and many other unreleased recordings exist and are subject to release. In 2000, Evans and Craig joined an ad-hoc version of Humble Pie formed by Charlie Huhn to fulfill touring obligations following an injury sustained by original Humble Pie drummer Jerry Shirley. This version of the band contained no original members.

Following the death of Lynyrd Skynyrd bassist Leon Wilkeson, Evans joined the current lineup of Lynyrd Skynyrd on August 11, 2001, in Las Vegas, Nevada.

== Death ==
In late 2008 Evans was diagnosed with lung cancer, of which he died on May 6, 2009, at his home in Columbus, Mississippi.

An ailing Evans performed with Skynyrd one last time from a chair on April 19, 2009, at the Mississippi Kid Festival, organized in support of him.

Lynyrd Skynyrd continued its 2009 tour with Robert Kearns on bass. He was followed by Johnny Colt from The Black Crowes. Johnny Van Zant asked audiences to pray for Evans.
