= This Is the Way (album) =

This Is The Way

Studio album by Rossington Collins Band
- Released: October 1981
- Genre: Southern rock
- Length: 41:22
- Label: MCA
- Producer: Allen Collins, Gary Rossington, Rossington Collins Band

Rossington Collins Band chronology
Anytime, Anyplace, Anywhere (1980)	This Is The Way (1981)

This Is the Way is the second and final studio album by the Rossington Collins Band.

== Reception ==
Professional ratings
Review scores
Source	Rating
AllMusic	3/5 stars
Record Mirror	1/5 stars

Robin Smith of Record Mirror panned the album in a 1/5 star review, calling it "the biggest load of hackneyed bollocks I've heard for a good six months." In The Boston Phoenix, Barry Hoberman wrote that "This the Way has a patchy, hastily assembled feel to it." Still, he felt that "it comes as no surprise that this new album doesn't approach the lofty standard set by Anytime, Anyplace, Anywhere - though it’s by no means a dire record." Michael B. Smith, in a retrospective review for AllMusic, wrote that the band "pay due homage to Ronnie Van Zandt [sic] with the songs 'Tashauna' and 'Pine Box', and rock with the best of 'em on 'Gotta Get It Straight' and "Gonna Miss It When It's Gone'."

== Track listing ==
1. "Gotta Get It Straight" (Krantz, Powell, Rossington) – 4:43
2. "Tashauna" (Krantz, Rossington) – 4:57
3. "Gonna Miss It When It's Gone" (Collins, Krantz, Rossington) – 3:51
4. "Pine Box" (Harwood) – 3:04
5. "Fancy Ideas" (Harwood, Hess, Wilkeson) – 4:36
6. "Don't Stop Me Now" (Krantz, Rossington) – 3:43
7. "Seems Like Every Day" (Krantz, Rossington) – 4:30
8. "I'm Free Today" (Harwood) – 3:24
9. "Next Phone Call" (Krantz, Rossington) – 3:33
10. "Means Nothing to You" (Harwood) – 5:00

== Personnel ==
- Allen Collins - guitars
- Barry Lee Harwood - guitars, vocals
- Derek Hess - drums
- Dale Krantz-Rossington - vocals
- Billy Powell - piano
- Gary Rossington - guitars
- Leon Wilkeson - bass
- Steve Klein - engineer, mixing

== Charts ==
Chart (1981)	Peak position
US Billboard 200	24
