= Anthony "Sooty" Jones =

Anthony Jones
- Also known as: "Sooty" Jones
- Born: 18 December 1952; United States
- Origin: Afro-American/Mohawk/German-Norwegian
- Died: 6 November 1999 (aged 46)
- Genres: Blues-rock, hard rock
- Instrument: Bass guitar
- Years active: 1966–1990
- Labels: Atco
- Formerly of: Humble Pie, The Planets

Anthony Jones (also known as "Sooty" Jones; December 18, 1952 – November 6, 1999) was an American rock bassist. He played bass guitar for the British band Humble Pie, when Steve Marriott reformed the group in April 1980. Jones is credited on the Humble Pie albums On to Victory released by Atco in 1980, and Go for the Throat also released by Atco the following year.

== Bibliography ==
- Paolo Hewitt John Hellier (2004). Steve Marriott - All Too Beautiful.... Helter Skelter Publishing ISBN 1-900924-44-7
