= The Rossington Band =

American rock band

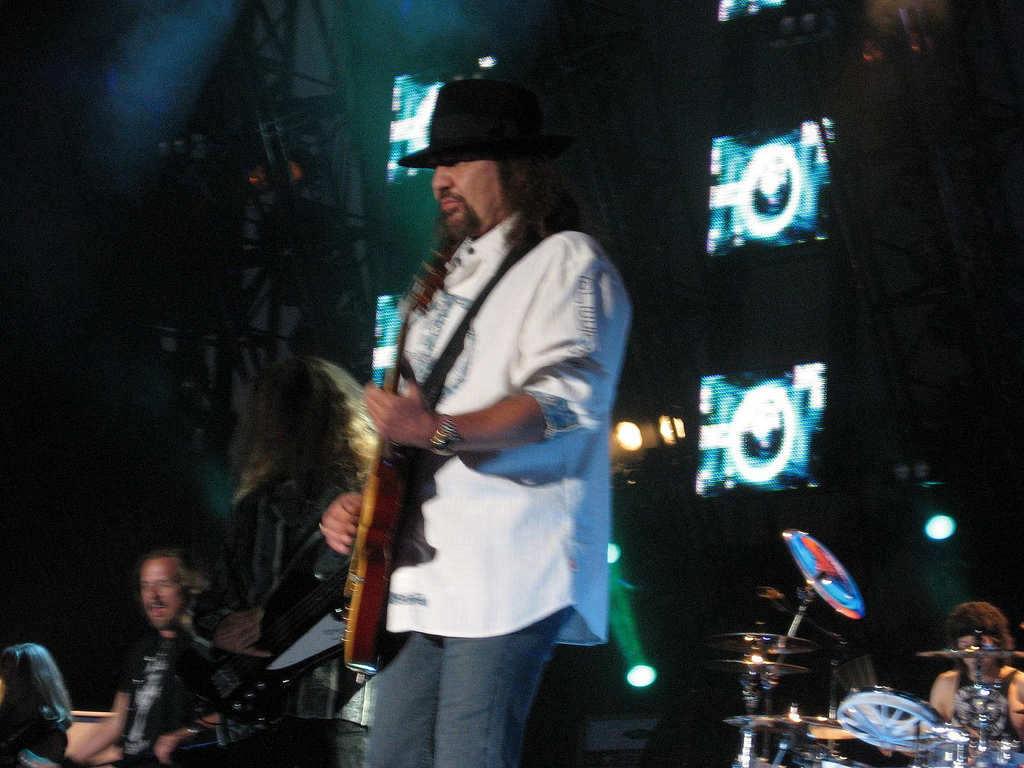

Background information
- Genres: AOR; pop rock
- Spinoff of: Lynyrd Skynyrd; Rossington Collins Band

Rossington was a rock band formed by Gary Rossington, of Lynyrd Skynyrd fame, and his wife Dale Krantz-Rossington after the breakup of the Rossington Collins Band.

== History ==
Gary and Dale married in 1982. Their marriage, in conjunction with the death of Allen Collins' wife and an unsuccessful second album, contributed to the demise of the Rossington-Collins Band.

The couple formed a new group, simply called Rossington. The band released their debut album, Returned to the Scene of the Crime, in 1986, having previously obtained drummer Derek Hess from the Allen Collins Band, the only original member with whom Gary Rossington had previously played in the RC Band besides Dale, who was retained as lead vocalist. Two years later, the band changed its name to "The Rossington Band" and released a second album, Love Your Man, and toured opening for the newly formed Lynyrd Skynyrd tribute band in 1988. After a 28-year hiatus, the album, Take It On Faith was released in November 2016, under the Rossington moniker.

Gary Rossington died on March 5, 2023, at the age of 71.

== Discography ==
- Returned to the Scene of the Crime (1986)
- Love Your Man (1988)
- Take It On Faith (2016)
