= Go for the Throat =

Studio album by Humble Pie
- Released: June 1981
- Recorded: 1980
- Studios: Mediasound (New York City); Soundworks (New York City)
- Genres: Rock, hard rock, blues rock
- Length: 35:21
- Labels: Atco, Polydor
- Producer: Gary Lyons

Humble Pie chronology
On to Victory (1980)	Go for the Throat (1981)	The Best of Humble Pie (1982)

Professional ratings
Review scores
Source	Rating
AllMusic	1/5 stars
The Rolling Stone Album Guide	1/5 stars

Go for the Throat is the tenth studio album recorded by the English rock band Humble Pie and the second with the new lineup including, guitarist and vocalist Steve Marriott, drummer Jerry Shirley, American bassist Anthony "Sooty" Jones and vocalist and guitarist, Bobby Tench from The Jeff Beck Group. Marriott also brought in backing vocalists Marge Raymond, Dana Kral and Robin Beck, once again looking for a more authenthic and refined R&B sound and feel. Go For The Throat was released by Atco in 1981 and the new version of "Tin Soldier" reached #58 in the US single charts.

The band toured the album after it had been released. At the beginning of the tour scheduled appearances by the band were delayed when Marriott damaged his hand. He then later became ill, forcing the cancellation of all further tour dates. Soon afterwards Humble Pie disbanded after being dropped by their record label due to contractual differences.

== Track listing ==
=== Side One ===
1. "All Shook Up" (Otis Blackwell, Elvis Presley) 2:40
2. "Teenage Anxiety" (Marriott) 4:44
3. "Tin Soldier" (Marriott, Ronnie Lane) 3:09
4. "Keep It on the Island" (Marriott, Shirley) 3:54
5. "Driver" (Marriott) 3:19

=== Side Two ===
1. "Restless Blood" (Richard Supa) 4:04
2. "Go for the Throat" (Marriott, Tench) 3:59
3. "Lottie and the Charcoal Queen" (Marriott, Shirley) 4:37
4. "Chip Away the Stone" (Richard Supa) 4:55

== Personnel ==
Humble Pie

- Steve Marriott – guitar, harmonica, keyboards, vocals
- Bob Tench – guitar, keyboards, vocals
- Anthony "Sooty" Jones – bass, vocals
- Jerry Shirley – drums, percussion

Additional personnel

- Robin Beck – vocals
- Maxine Dixon – vocals
- Dana Kral – vocals

Producer

- Gary Lyons – producer

== Charts ==
Chart (1981)	Peak position
US Billboard 200	154

== Bibliography ==
- Steve Marriott - All Too Beautiful.... Paolo Hewitt and John Heller. Helter Skelter Publishing (2005). ISBN 1-900924-44-7
- George-Warren and Romanowski, Patricia. The Rolling Stone Encyclopedia of Rock & Roll. Fireside (2001). Digitized Dec 21 (2006)
- Muise, Dan. Gallagher, Marriott, Derringer & Trower: Their lives and music. Hal Leonard Corporation (2002). ISBN 978-0-634-02956-1
