= On to Victory (album) =

Studio album by Humble Pie
- Released: April 1980
- Recorded: 1980
- Studios: Villa Recorders, Modesto, California
- Genre: Rock
- Length: 43:26
- Labels: Atco, Jet
- Producers: Humble Pie, John Elijah Wright

Humble Pie chronology
Back Home Again (1976)	On to Victory (1980)	Go for the Throat (1981)

Professional ratings
Review scores
Source	Rating
AllMusic	2/5 stars
(The New) Rolling Stone Album Guide	1/5 stars

On to Victory is a studio album recorded by the English rock band Humble Pie. It was the first with a new lineup including vocalist and guitarist Steve Marriott, drummer Jerry Shirley, vocalist and guitarist Bobby Tench from the Jeff Beck Group, and American bassist Anthony "Sooty" Jones.

== Background ==
They recorded "Fool for a Pretty Face", which Marriott had written earlier and the song proved good enough for them to secure a recording contract with Atco in 1980. In UK their material was released by Jet Records, owned by the former Small Faces manager Don Arden. The album peaked #60 on the Billboard 200 album chart "Fool for a Pretty Face" was released as a single and reached #58 on the US singles charts and a promotional tour followed as part of The Rock'n Roll Marathon, supporting Frank Marino & Mahogany Rush, Angel & Mother's Finest.

== Track listing ==
=== Side one ===
1. "Fool for a Pretty Face" (Marriott, Shirley) 4:12
2. "You Soppy Pratt" (Marriott, Jones, Shirley) 4:08
3. "Infatuation" (Marriott) 3:45
4. "Take It from Here" (Marriott) 3:39
5. "Savin' It" (Tench, Marriott) 4:41

=== Side two ===
1. "Baby Don't You Do It" (Holland-Dozier-Holland) 3:25
2. "Get It in the End" (Marriott, Jones, Shirley) 2:41
3. "My Lover's Prayer" (Otis Redding) 4:02
4. "Further Down the Road" (Marriott, Tench, Jones, Shirley) 4:29
5. "Over You" (Allen Orange, Clarence Toussaint ) 2:22

Single

"Fool for a Pretty Face" (Marriott, Shirley) b/w "You Soppy Pratt" (Marriott, Jones, Shirley) [Atco 7216]

== Personnel ==
Humble Pie

- Steve Marriott – guitar, harmonica, keyboards, vocals
- Bobby Tench – guitar, vocals
- Anthony "Sooty" Jones – bass, vocals
- Jerry Shirley – drums

Additional personnel

- Cheryl Ashley – backing vocals
- Marge Raymond – backing vocals
- Lisa Zimmerman – backing vocals

Production

- Produced by The Pie and Johnny Wright
- Recorded
- Remixed at Soundworks, New York, New York
- Engineered by John Wright, Akili Walker, Claig

== Charts ==
Chart (1980)	Peak position
Canada Top Albums/CDs (RPM)	89
US Billboard 200	60
