= Rossington Collins Band =

American southern rock band

- Origin: Jacksonville, Florida, U.S.
- Genres: Southern rock
- Years active: 1979–1982
- Label: MCA Records
- Spinoffs: Allen Collins Band; The Rossington Band
- Spinoff of: Lynyrd Skynyrd
- Past members: Gary Rossington; Allen Collins; Leon Wilkeson; Billy Powell; Dale Krantz; Barry Lee Harwood; Derek Hess

The Rossington Collins Band was an American Southern rock band founded in 1979 by guitarists Gary Rossington and Allen Collins following the 1977 plane crash which killed three members of Lynyrd Skynyrd, of which both had been members. The band included two other surviving members of Lynyrd Skynyrd, Billy Powell and Leon Wilkeson. The band wished to develop their own sound rather than being regarded as a reformed Lynyrd Skynyrd, and toward that objective they hired a female lead vocalist, Dale Krantz, who later married Rossington. The Jacksonville-based band released two albums before disbanding in 1982. Their biggest hit, "Don't Misunderstand Me," charted in late 1980.

== Formation history ==
Following the crash of the Skynyrd plane in October 1977, chances for a reunion looked slim. Allen Collins had severe injuries to his arm that almost made it necessary for the arm to be amputated. Leon Wilkeson had suffered internal injuries that initially made doctors declare him dead at the scene of the crash, only to be resuscitated later. He also had a badly broken arm. Gary Rossington had also suffered severe injuries in the crash. Only Artimus Pyle (former Lynyrd Skynyrd drummer) and Billy Powell were in good enough condition to be released from the hospital within two weeks of the crash.

The earliest recording effort made by former band members were Pyle and Powell's involvement in the studio sessions for musician Leo LeBranche. Soon after, Powell, Pyle, Wilkeson, and Jo Billingsley (former Skynyrd vocalist) formed the band Alias (not to be confused with the 1980s Canadian rock band of the same name), which only existed for one album and a small round of live shows. The band also featured guitarist Barry Lee Harwood (who had played mandolin on Skynyrd's "Gimme Back My Bullets" record of 1976) and who would later be involved with the RCB.

Charlie Daniels gave new hope to fans in January 1979, when he announced "Lynyrd Skynyrd is back!" at his Volunteer Jam V in Nashville, Tennessee. All remaining members of Lynyrd Skynyrd, with the exception of bassist Wilkeson (whose arm was still in a cast) performed an instrumental version of "Free Bird."

From there, plans began to form a new band. However, Rossington and Collins did not wish for this new venture to be another Lynyrd Skynyrd, so they opted for Dale Krantz, who had been a backing singer for .38 Special and who Gary Rossington later married in 1982. Guitarist Barry Lee Harwood was living in Atlanta at the time when he got the call from Rossington and Collins to be in the band.

All seemed set, until Artimus Pyle, who had been slated to start rehearsals with the band, was involved in a motorcycle accident that broke his leg. Pyle decided that the RCB should find a new drummer rather than wait for him to recuperate. The suggestion came from Harwood to hire Jacksonville native Derek Hess.

The Rossington-Collins Band, as it was named, then began rehearsals and writing, which took a little longer than expected because of Krantz's initial anxiety about being in this band. Even while in the studio, RCB would continue to write and revise their songs until they were considered finished. This led to the use of many master reels of recordings.

== Touring history ==
The band initially premiered in the summer of 1980 to positive reviews. One highlight of the 1980 tour backing their album Anytime, Anyplace, Anywhere, was a New Year's Eve performance at the Omni in Atlanta, Georgia. One permanent feature in the set lists was "Free Bird," which was performed without vocals and was dedicated to Ronnie Van Zant, Steve Gaines, Cassie Gaines, and Dean Kilpatrick.

At one performance in Springfield, Massachusetts during 1980, guitarist Rossington had to play onstage with a broken leg, which happened the day before.

Following the death of his wife, Kathy, Allen Collins would routinely walk off from gigs or not appear. This led to the cancellation of many performances during 1982. In addition to his Fender Stratocaster and Gibson Explorer, guitarist Collins switched between two double-cutaway Gibson Les Paul Specials during the live shows. Collins had not used a Les Paul since the early 1970s.

Despite the short length of The Rossington-Collins Band's existence, there were many soundboard recordings made of live shows, and studio recordings made by Allen Collins in preparation for their first studio album.

== Allen Collins Band ==
In 1983, the Allen Collins Band, featuring Allen Collins, Barry Lee Harwood, Leon Wilkeson, Billy Powell, and Derek Hess from RCB along with Randall Hall and Jimmy Dougherty, former singer in Alias, was formed but quickly fell apart due to Collins' erratic behavior and lack of leadership. Collins tried to resurrect the project in 1985 but in early 1986, he was sidelined by a serious injury, which left him partially paralyzed, when he crashed his car into a culvert near his Mandarin home, killing his girlfriend, Debra Jean Watts, instantly. Collins assembled a Skynyrd-tribute band in 1987, which would evolve into a full-fledged Skynyrd re-formation.

== Members ==
- Gary Rossington - guitar
- Allen Collins - guitar
- Leon Wilkeson - bass guitar
- Billy Powell - keyboards
- Dale Krantz - vocals
- Barry Lee Harwood - guitar, vocals
- Derek Hess - drums and percussion

== Discography ==
- Anytime, Anyplace, Anywhere (1980) (No. 13, Billboard 200 albums, gold record)
- This Is the Way (1981) (No. 24, Billboard 200)
