= Outlaws (band) =

American rock band

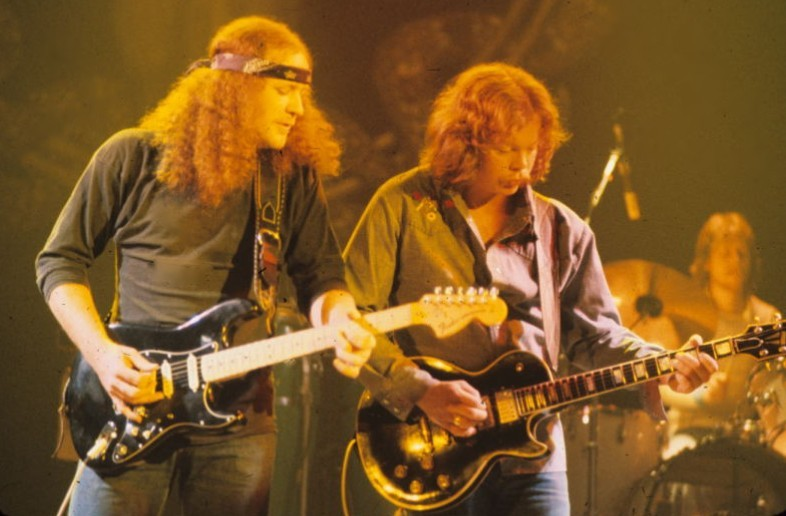
- Guitarists Hughie Thomasson and Billy Jones in the 1970s

Background information
- Also known as: The Four Letter Words (1967)
- Origin: Tampa, Florida, U.S.
- Genres: Southern rock; country rock
- Years active: 1967–1971; 1972–1996; 2005–present
- Labels: Arista; Cleopatra
- Spinoffs: Blackhawk
- Members: Henry Paul; Jeff Aulich; Jimmy Dormire; Randy Threet; Dave Robbins; Mike Bailey; Henry Paul IV
- Past members: Hughie Thomasson; Frank Guidry; Herb Pino; David Dix; James "Bo" Metz; Phil Holmberg; Hobie O'Brien; Frank O'Keefe; Tommy Angarano; Ronny Elliot; Monte Yoho; Dave Graham; Billy Jones; Buzzy Meekins; Rick Birkbeck; Harvey Dalton Arnold; Freddie Salem; Rick Cua; Mike Duke; Bob Jenkins; Chuck Glass; Steve Grisham; Chris Anderson; Roy McDonald; Anthony "Nino" Catanzaro; Barry "B. B." Borden; Steve Kaye; Rich Parks; Ean Evans; David Lane; Billy Yates; Billy Greer; Chris "Hitman" Hicks; Rob Carroll; Timothy Cabe; Eric Wynne; Jeff Howell; Billy Davis; Sean Burke; Frank Thomas; Kevin Neal; Steven Elliot; Ric Toole; Billy Crain; Jon " Squirrel" Coleman; Brett Cartwright; Dale Oliver; Jaran Sorenson; Michael Grando
- Website: outlawsmusic.com

The Outlaws are an American Southern rock band from Tampa, Florida. They are best known for their 1975 hit "There Goes Another Love Song" and extended guitar jam "Green Grass and High Tides" from their 1975 debut album, plus their 1980 cover of the Stan Jones classic "(Ghost) Riders in the Sky".

== History ==
=== Early years (1967–1974) ===
The Outlaws were formed in Tampa, Florida in 1967 by guitarists/vocalists Frank Guidry, Hughie Thomasson, Herbie Pino and Hobie O'Brien. Drummer David Dix and bassist Phil Holmberg joined the band as well. Before Guidry joined, the band was called The Four Letter Words, but changed to the "Outlaws", since Guidry had previously been in a band by the same name.

By early 1968, O'Brien and Holmberg both left the band to get married and Frank O'Keefe came in on vocals and bass. Later that year, Tommy Angarano (Tommy Tempest), joined the Outlaws to replace Pino, bringing Hammond organ sounds and his style of vocals to the band. But after he left, Pino was brought back in.

In the spring of 1968, the group's first manager, Paul Deutekom, brought them to Epic Studios in New York City to record an album, which was never released after the band and the producer had a falling-out.

The group headed back to Tampa then got another deal to go to Criteria Studios in Miami. There they recorded another album with producer Phil Gernhard. But this album was likewise never released and Gernhard vanished soon after. As part of the Gernhard record deal, bassist Ronny Elliott was brought in around this time, forcing Guidry out. Ronny played bass while O'Keefe briefly switched to guitar. But O'Keefe went back to bass after Elliott left in 1969 and Herbie Pino, who had mostly been a singer up till that time, began playing more guitar as well. Drummer Monte Yoho also joined that same year to substitute for Dix.

In early 1970, the Outlaws were joined by two members of the Dave Graham Group that was also managed by Paul Deutekom (of Ped-Dyn Productions). The Dave Graham Group's Union leader was Monte Yoho, but he was not invited to be part of this line-up. The early 1970 the Outlaws line-up was Hughie Thomasson, Frank O'Keefe, Dave Dix, Billy Jones and Dave Graham. Graham was influential in moving the group toward country-rock, especially the music of Poco. They also recorded a cover of the Doors' "Five to One" as an audition to a recording deal that never materialized. This lineup ended in the spring of 1970 and the group eventually parted ways with Deutekom. Yoho and Herb Pino returned, but by 1971 the offers for gigs had slowed down and the group went into limbo for a year or so, not sure if they would continue.

In 1971 Henry Paul, a singer and guitarist who was born and raised in Hurley, New York, but spent his later teen years in the Tampa area, returned from a stay in Greenwich Village, New York City, to form Sienna, which was more of a country rock outfit. He was joined by Monte Yoho and Frank O'Keefe. In 1972, Hughie Thomasson returned from a brief spell in New York, how where he had been backing folksinger Milton Carroll, joined up with Paul, Yoho and O'Keefe and Sienna became the reborn Outlaws.

Billy Jones, who would sometimes show up to jam with the group on organ in 1971, returned from a stint in Boulder, Colorado, in 1973 and switched to guitar, giving birth to the band's first infamous guitar trio later dubbed "The Florida Guitar Army". O'Keefe left the group temporarily in 1973–74. Thomas "Buzzy" Meekins and another bassist named Rick Birkbeck stood in until he was able to return.

In 1974 Charlie Brusco signed on as manager for Outlaws. Alan Walden (brother of Capricorn Records founder Phil Walden) was told of the group by Lynyrd Skynyrd frontman Ronnie Van Zant, and he joined forces with Brusco as co-manager.

The band was the first act signed to Arista Records under Clive Davis. Davis was in the audience at a show in 1974 where the band was opening for Lynyrd Skynyrd in Columbus, Georgia. On the way to the stage for Lynyrd Skynyrd's set, lead vocalist Ronnie Van Zant said to Clive Davis, who was with Charlie Brusco, "If you don't sign Outlaws, you're the dumbest music person I've ever met—and I know you're not."

=== Peak (1975–1979) ===
The Outlaws' earliest well known songs were "There Goes Another Love Song" and "Green Grass and High Tides", both from their 1975 debut album Outlaws. Their 1980 cover of "(Ghost) Riders in the Sky" from the album Ghost Riders was their biggest single chart success, reaching No. 31 on the Billboard Hot 100.

While the Outlaws are generally considered to be a part of the Southern rock genre, their primary similarity to other Southern rock bands is the dual lead guitar interplay, a defining characteristic of many Southern rock bands. However, the Outlaws' mix of country and rock elements displays the vocal harmony influences of groups like Buffalo Springfield, the Byrds, Eagles, New Riders of the Purple Sage and Poco. Their use of three and four part harmonies set them apart from their contemporaries who usually relied on a single lead vocalist.

Hughie Thomasson's signature guitar playing style and voice were also defining characteristics of the band's sound. Thomasson's guitar sound was underpinned by the use of the Fender Stratocaster (and sometimes a Telecaster) played in a quasi-country style mixed with fluid, quick blues runs. Hughie was nicknamed "The Flame" for his flaming fast guitar work. He is a member of the Fender Hall of Fame.

The other lead guitarist, Billy Jones, played mainly a Gibson Les Paul and switched between a clean and distorted sound. A good example of this can be heard on "Green Grass and High Tides" on the right stereo channel. Hughie Thomasson's distinctive Stratocaster sound can be heard on the left channel. Thomasson opens the first solo at the intro and plays the first half of the two succeeding longer solos all on the right channel. There are many video examples of his Green Grass solos on the internet.

The records released by the band between 1975 and 1980 are considered the best representation of the band's style. During this period, the Outlaws performed as a support act for non-Southern rock acts of the time, such as The Who, The Rolling Stones, Aerosmith, Queen, Black Sabbath, Rush, Blue Öyster Cult, Ted Nugent, Peter Frampton, Foghat, Van Halen and REO Speedwagon. This contrast of styles was more common at that time than the packaged "genre" tours seen so often these days. The willingness of promoters to mix styles led to the Outlaws gaining a large following in the United States.

The Outlaws' style is clearly demonstrated in their first three albums, Outlaws (1975), Lady in Waiting (1976) and Hurry Sundown (1977). These are considered the best work of the band with all of the "classic era" band members.

O'Keefe broke a bone in his neck after a fall into an empty pool on July 3, 1976 and was replaced by left-handed bass player Harvey Dalton Arnold on Hurry Sundown. Henry Paul left after the Sundown album in 1977 and eventually formed the Henry Paul Band, which would release four albums from 1979 to 1982. Paul was replaced by Freddie Salem (vocals, guitar) and drummer David Dix returned after the release of Sundown in 1977 to play alongside Yoho, making for a two-drummer lineup on Bring It Back Alive (1978), Playin' to Win (1978) and In the Eye of the Storm (1979), but Yoho left by the end of 1979.

=== Later years (1980–1996) ===
The albums released after 1980 are largely viewed by critics as a gradual move away from the original sound that gained them success in the 1970s. The reworking of the Western-styled "Ghost Riders" in 1980 was the band's last taste of big-league success. Keyboardist Mike Duke (from Wet Willie) appeared with the group from 1980-1981 and played on Ghost Riders.

Billy Jones was let go in late 1981 due to increasing substance abuse troubles, and the depleted lineup of Thomasson, Dix, Salem and new bassist Rick Cua (who joined in 1980, just before Ghost Riders) released Los Hombres Malo in 1982. Violinist Dave Lane (later to return briefly to the group as a guitarist in 1989) guested with the band on their 1982 tour but Arista dropped them after less than stellar sales for Los Hombres Malo, releasing Greatest Hits of the Outlaws, High Tides Forever at the close of that year.

In 1983 the group was back to touring clubs, with Bob Jenkins replacing Salem on guitar, but at this point Thomasson, who owned the name, was briefly considering taking a job outside the music business. But in the middle of that same year, he and Dix decided to reunite with Henry Paul, while bringing in new players Steve Grisham (guitar, backing vocals) and Chuck Glass (vocals, bass, keyboards) and the new lineup eventually signed with Spencer Proffer and his Pasha Records label, who released Soldiers of Fortune in the fall of 1986.

Chris Anderson replaced Grisham on guitar in late 1986, but when Soldiers of Fortune also failed to sell in the big numbers, Pasha was eventually absorbed into CBS Records and the Outlaws were once again without a record label. Anderson was with the band from 1986 to 1989 and later returned in 2005, when the group reunited. And Henry Paul stayed on as well until 1989, then went on to form the country band BlackHawk, which had a lot of Country chart success in the 1990s.

During the late 80s and early to mid-90s, the band was back on the club and state fair circuit with Thomasson leading a "revolving door lineup". Roy McDonald - bass, backing vocals (1987), Anthony "Nino" Catanzaro – bass, vocals (1987, 1989–1990, 1992–1993), Barry "B. B." Borden (drums, percussion (1987–1995, formerly of Mother's Finest and Molly Hatchet, later with Marshall Tucker Band ), Steve Kaye – bass (1988), Rich Parks – guitars, vocals (1988; 1991), Ean Evans – bass, vocals (1988–1989, 1992, later with Lynyrd Skynyrd), David Lane – guitar (1989), Billy Yates – guitars, vocals (1989–1991), Billy Greer – bass, vocals (1990, also with Kansas), Chris "Hitman" Hicks – guitars, vocals (1990–1996), Rob Carroll – bass, vocals (1990–1992), Timothy Cabe – guitars, vocals (1991–1993), Eric Wynne – bass (1992), Jeff Howell – bass, vocals (1993–1996, formerly with Foghat), Billy Davis – guitars, vocals (1993–1994, later with Badfinger), Sean Burke – drums, percussion (1995, formerly with Atlanta Rhythm Section), Frank Thomas - drums (1995), Kevin Neal – drums (1995–1996) and Steven Elliot – stand-in guitarist (1996) all traveled in and out of the lineup during that period.

Hittin' the Road Live was a 1993 live album that was released on Shrapnel, a mostly hard rock/heavy metal oriented label owned by Mike Varney and Diablo Canyon, released in 1994, was put out on Varney's Blues Bureau International label.

In 1996, Thomasson accepted a guitar position in the legendary and more popular Lynyrd Skynyrd. This essentially sidelined the Outlaws for a decade, as Thomasson's voice and guitar style were just too integral a part of the Outlaws' sound for the other members to work without it successfully. So Low, which had been recorded but shelved when Thomasson joined Skynyrd, was released in 2000 to mixed response from fans. Many cited it as being more of a solo output from Thomasson. After this release, the band again vanished from the musical environment.

The other two members from the band's heyday, guitarist Billy Jones and bassist Frank O'Keefe, both died in February 1995. Jones committed suicide on the 7th at age 45, and O'Keefe died on the 26th of a drug overdose at age 44.

=== Reunion (2005–present) ===
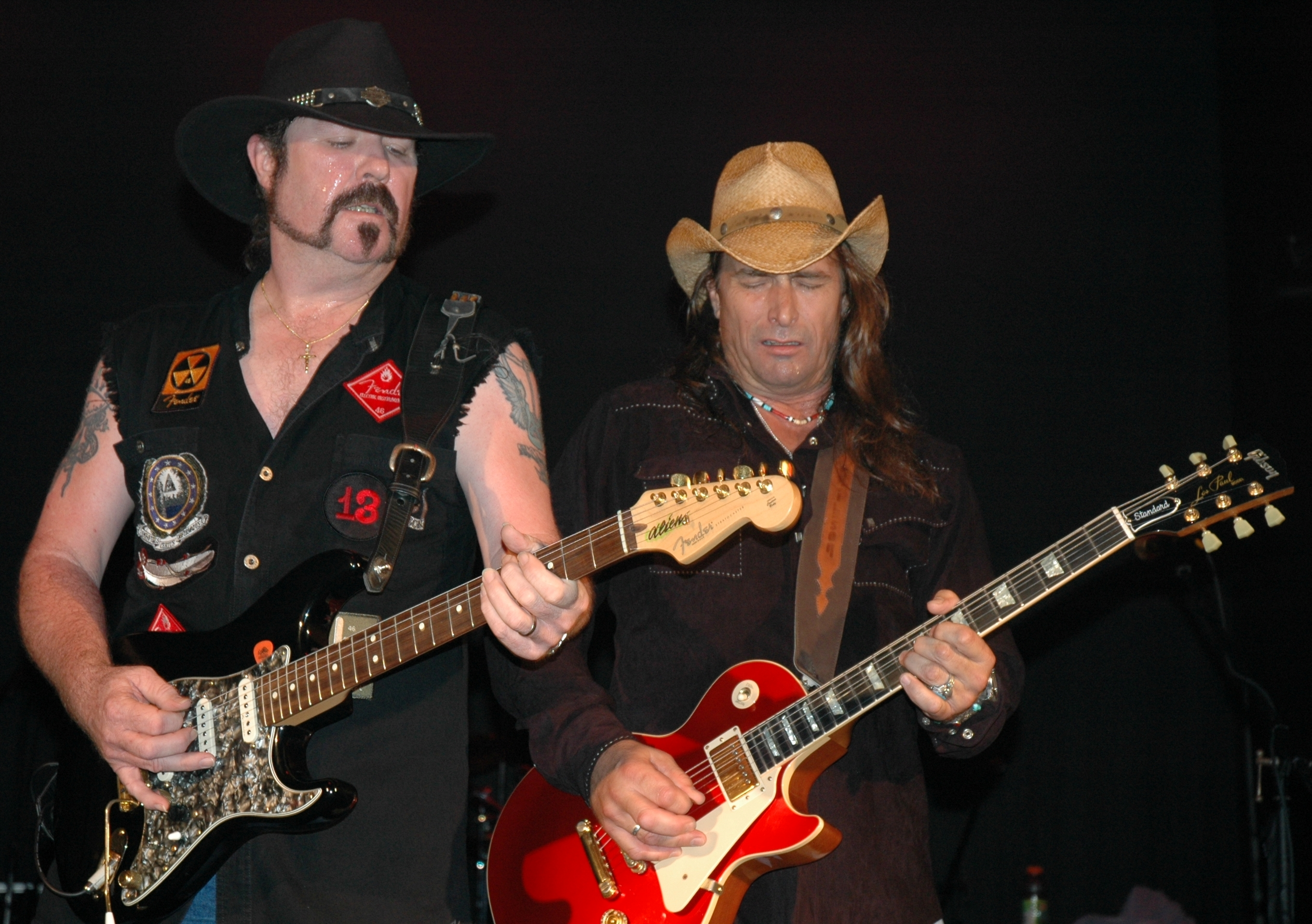
Hughie Thomasson and Chris Anderson performing in 2006

In April 2005, four of the six classic band members—Hughie Thomasson, Henry Paul, Monte Yoho and David Dix—reunited as the Outlaws. In addition to them, the band included former guitarist Chris Anderson and new members, bassist Randy Threet and keyboardist Dave Robbins, all three of whom had been with Paul's country group, BlackHawk.

Paul and Robbins left to resume their careers in BlackHawk in early 2006, but the remaining band soldiered on. They were part of the Charlie Daniels Volunteer Jam tour in the summer of 2007. Outlaws put on their last show with Hughie at the Tropicana Hotel and Casino in Nevada, only a day before Hughie's untimely death.

Band leader Hughie Thomasson died on September 9, 2007, of a heart attack in Brooksville, Florida. No release date has been announced for the studio album, Once an Outlaw, which was finished before Thomasson's death. The Thomasson family was going to release an album in early 2010, but it was cancelled. However, the album has been illegally leaked onto the internet.

A cover version of their trademark epic 10-minute track "Green Grass and High Tides" is featured as the finale in the set list for guitar and bass in the video game Rock Band and features two complicated solos.

In December 2007, 2008 Outlaws tour dates were released. At the same time, it was revealed that the band would continue despite Thomasson's death. Henry Paul became the new lead singer, frontman and bandleader. In January 2008, the Outlaws lineup would be revealed to include Henry Paul (guitars/vocals), Monte Yoho (drums) and Chris Anderson (guitars/vocals), along with newer additions Billy Crain (guitars), Jon Coleman (keyboards) and Brett Cartwright (bass, ex-Foghat), who was soon replaced by the returning Randy Threet. This would be the first lineup in Outlaws' history without Hughie Thomasson on guitar and vocals, as from the band's formation to his death, he was the only constant member, garnering him the nicknames "Mr. Outlaw" and "The Lone Outlaw".

According to the band's web site, the Outlaws announced their intention to continue to tour throughout the summer and fall of 2009 with this lineup and planned to participate in the Simple Man Cruise with Lynyrd Skynyrd in January 2010.

In May 2010, the Outlaws were featured, along with the Marshall Tucker Band, Molly Hatchet, Blackberry Smoke and the Chris Hicks Band, on stage at Long Island Southern Jam 2010 in Babylon, New York at Overlook Beach. The all-day concert featured a unique jam fest for all the bands.

For the 2010 tour, Dave Robbins returned on keyboards and Henry Paul was involved in a lawsuit brought about by Hughie Thomasson's widow, Mary, which alleged trademark violations. It was also stated on the website that the band would change its name to 'Henry Paul Band' if they were to lose the case, but to continue touring with the same setlists. In April 2011 the case was ruled upon in favor of Henry Paul, Monte Yoho and the co-defendants. They continue touring and recording under the name Outlaws.

On July 30, 2012, it was announced on the band's website that "their first new album in 12 years" would be released on September 25, 2012, titled It's About Pride. It was also accompanied by a separately released DVD documentary about the making of the new album, called Hidin' Out In Tennessee. Led by Henry Paul, the album was critically acclaimed. A few years before the album, Paul had recruited an old friend from the Henry Paul Band, lead guitarist Billy Crain to join the band. Paul and Crain collaborated on writing many of the songs for It's About Pride. The final track was a cover of the Henry Paul Band song "So Long" from its 1979 debut album, Grey Ghost.

In 2013, Crain left the group due to health issues and Steve Grisham, who performed on the 1986 album Soldiers of Fortune, rejoined as guitarist.

In 2014, founding guitarist Herbie Pino died, leaving David Dix, Frank Guidry, Hobie O'Brien, and Phil Holmberg as the four remaining original members.

In 2016, the Outlaws released a 2-CD concert set titled Legacy Live.

In 2018, Dale Oliver (guitar), former touring guitarist with country band BlackHawk, replaced Chris Anderson. Paul and Yoho had asked Anderson to leave due to several disagreements.

Later in 2018, Monte Yoho took a break due to his health problems. At the time, drummer Jaran Sorenson joined the band. But Yoho returned in 2019 and Sorenson also continued in the band, with the Outlaws fielding two drummers again, until Yoho retired in 2021. Since this time, Henry Paul is the only "classic era member" in the lineup. The band continued touring with Sorenson, but he left the group in February 2022 and Michael Grando replaced him until September 2022 when Mike Bailey came in for Grando.

The band's album Dixie Highway was released in 2020.

Steve Grisham retired in June 2021, after which, guitarist Jeff Aulich took over. Dale Oliver fell ill in the fall of 2021 and took a break from touring. Guitarist Jimmy Dormire is currently touring with the Outlaws.

In September 2024, it was revealed Freddie Salem had died at the age of 70.

Henry Paul's son, Henry "Little Hank" Paul IV, officially joined the Outlaws as the fourth guitarist and vocalist in 2025.

== Members ==
Current members

- Henry Paul – guitars, vocals (1972–1977, 1983–1989, 2005–2006, 2008–present)
- Dave Robbins – keyboards, backing vocals (2005–2006, 2010–present)
- Randy Threet – bass, vocals (2005–present)
- Jeff Aulich – guitars (2021–present)
- Jimmy Dormire – guitars (2021–present)
- Mike Bailey – drums (2022–present)
- Henry Paul IV – guitar, vocals (2025-present)

Former members

- Hughie Thomasson – guitars, vocals, pedal steel guitar, banjo (1967–1996, 2005–2007; died 2007)†
- Frank Guidry – lead vocal, guitars (1967–1968)
- Herb Pino – guitar, vocals (1967–1970, 1971–1972; died 2014)†
- David Dix – drums, percussion (1967–1969, 1970, 1977–1987, 2005–2007)
- Phil Holmberg – bass (1967)
- Hobie O'Brien – guitar (1967)
- Frank O'Keefe – bass, guitar, vocals (1967–1973, 1974–1976; died 1995)†
- Tommy Angarano – Hammond B3, vocals (1968)
- Ronny Elliot – bass (2 weeks-1968)
- Monte Yoho – drums, percussion (1969, 1970–1979, 2005–2021)
- Dave Graham – guitar, piano, vocals (1970)
- Billy Jones – guitars, keyboards, vocals (1971, 1972–1981; died 1995)†
- Buzzy Meekins – bass (1973–1974; died 2015)†
- Rick Birkbeck – bass (1974)
- Harvey Dalton Arnold – bass, vocals (1976–1980)
- Freddie Salem – guitars, vocals (1977–1983; died 2024)†
- Rick Cua – bass, vocals (1980–1983)
- Mike Duke – keyboards, vocals (1980–1981)
- Bob Jenkins – guitar, vocals (1983)
- Steve Grisham – guitars, vocals (1983–1986, 2013–2021)
- Chuck Glass – bass, keyboards, vocals (1983–1987)
- Chris Anderson – guitars, vocals (1986–1989, 2005–2018)
- Roy McDonald – bass (1987)
- Anthony "Nino" Catanzaro – bass, vocals (1987, 1989–1990, 1992–1993)
- Barry "B. B." Borden – drums, percussion (1987–1995)
- Steve Kaye – bass (1988)
- Rich Parks – guitars, vocals (1988; guest - 1991)
- Ean Evans – bass, vocals (1988–1989, 1992; died 2009)†
- David Lane – guitar (1989), violin (guest - 1982)
- Billy Yates – guitars, vocals (1989–1991)
- Billy Greer – bass, vocals (1990)
- Chris "Hitman" Hicks – guitars, vocals (1990–1996)
- Rob Carroll – bass, vocals (1990–1992)
- Timothy Cabe – guitars, vocals (1991–1993)
- Eric Wynne – bass (1992)
- Jeff Howell – bass, vocals (1993–1996; died 2022)†
- Billy Davis – guitars, vocals (1993–1994; died 2015)†
- Sean Burke – drums, percussion (1995)
- Frank Thomas – stand-in drummer (1995)
- Kevin Neal – drums (1995–1996)
- Steven Elliot – stand-in guitarist (1996)
- Ric Toole – guitar (2006)
- Billy Crain – guitars, vocals (2008–2013)
- Jon " Squirrel" Coleman – keyboards, backing vocals (2008–2010)
- Brett Cartwright – bass (2008)
- Dale Oliver – guitars (2018–2021)
- Jaran Sorenson – drums, percussion (2019–2022)
- Michael Grando – drums (2022)

== Discography ==
=== Studio albums ===
Year	Title	Peak chart positions		Certifications
Year	Title	US	CAN	Certifications
1975	Outlaws	13	48	US: Gold
1976	Lady in Waiting	36	51	
1977	Hurry Sundown	51	-	
1978	Playin' to Win	60	65	
1979	In the Eye of the Storm	55	-	
1980	Ghost Riders	25	12	US: Gold
1982	Los Hombres Malo	77	-	
1986	Soldiers of Fortune	160	-	
1994	Diablo Canyon	-	-	
2000	So Low [credited to Hughie Thomasson]	-	-	
2007	Once An Outlaw (unreleased)	-	-	
2012	It's About Pride	-	-	
2020	Dixie Highway	-	-	

=== Live albums ===
Year	Title	Peak chart positions		Certifications
Year	Title	US	CAN	Certifications
1978	Bring It Back Alive	29	46	US: Gold
1993	Hittin' the Road Live	-	-	
2002	Extended Versions	-	-	
2015	Live in Los Angeles 1976	-	-	
2016	Legacy Live	-	-	
2018	The Hits Live!	-	-	
2019	Knoxville Girl	-	-	
2020	Live at Rockpalast 1981	-	-	
2022	Three Giants, One Tour: Live in Germany 1992 (feat. Leslie West)	-	-	
2022	Alive In America (Recorded in Denver July 23, 1975 at Ebbets Field)	-	-	

=== Compilations ===
Year	Title
1982	Greatest Hits of the Outlaws, High Tides Forever
1996	Best of the Outlaws: Green Grass and High Tides
2003	Platinum & Gold Collection: The Best of the Outlaws
2009	Super Hits

=== Singles ===
Year	Title	Peak chart positions			Album
Year	Title	NLD	US	CAN	Album
1975	"There Goes Another Love Song"	30	34	56	Outlaws
1976	"Breaker-Breaker"	19	94	77	Lady in Waiting
1977	"Hurry Sundown"	-	60	-	Hurry Sundown
1980	"(Ghost) Riders in the Sky"	-	31	15	Ghost Riders

== Videography ==
=== Official video releases ===
- Outlaws Video LP - live concert - VHS (1983)

=== Unofficial video releases ===
- Outlaws Live at The Summit, Houston, Texas - DVD (1977)
- Outlaws Live at The Rockpalast, Loreley, Germany - DVD (1981)
- Outlaws Live at The Tower Theater, Philadelphia - DVD (1982)
