= Henry Paul (singer) =

American singer-songwriter

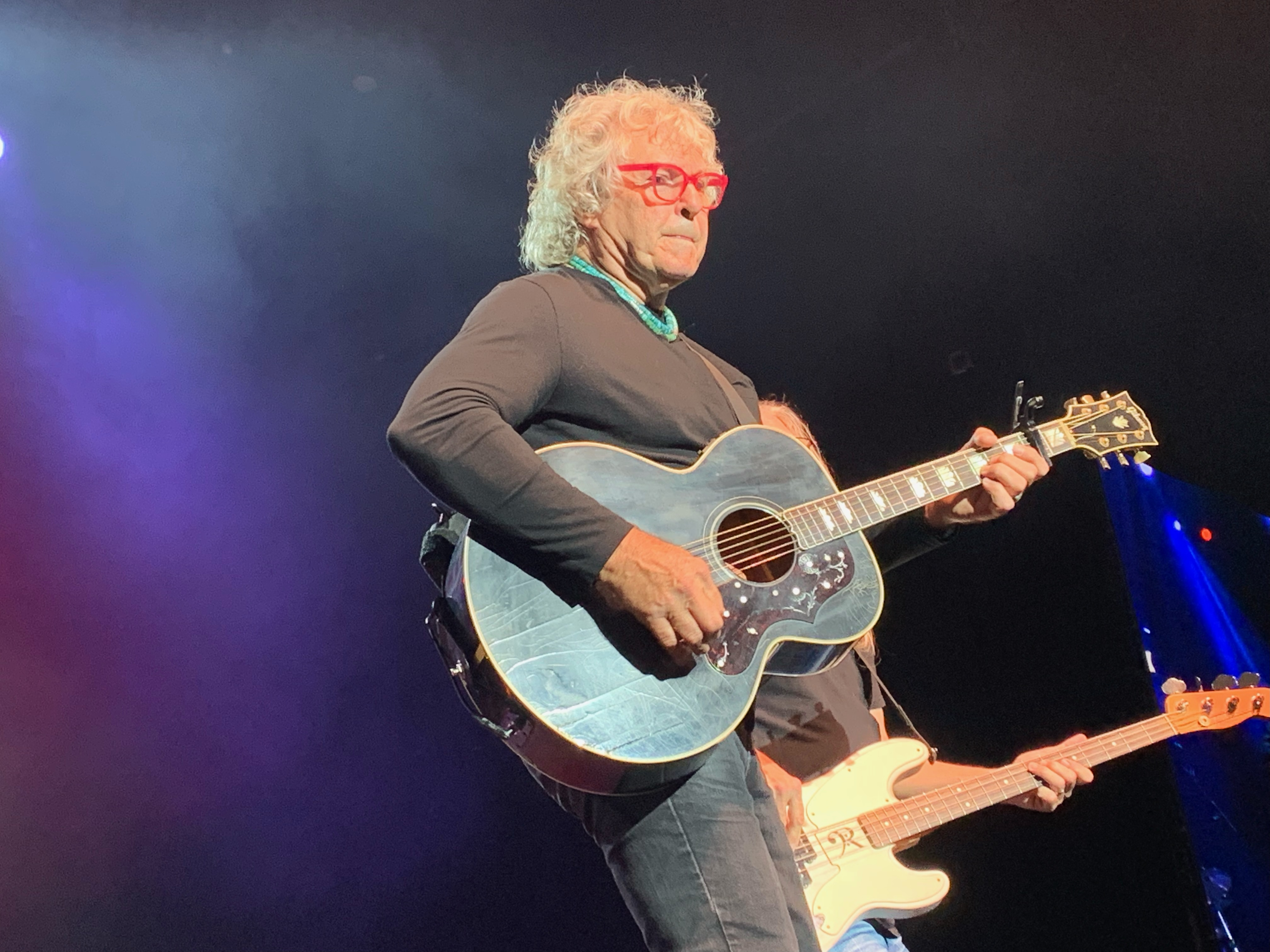
- Henry Paul performing with Blackhawk in May 2024.

Background information
- Born: August 25, 1949 (age 76); Kingston, New York, U.S.
- Origin: St. Petersburg, Florida, U.S.
- Genres: Southern rock; country
- Occupations: Musician; singer; songwriter
- Instruments: Vocals; guitar; mandolin
- Years active: 1966–present
- Member of: Blackhawk; Outlaws
- Formerly of: Henry Paul Band

Henry Paul (born August 25, 1949) is an American musician, singer, and songwriter who was an original recording member of the Southern rock band Outlaws. Paul left to form the Henry Paul Band but then returned to the Outlaws. He also is a founding member of the country band Blackhawk.

== Biography ==
=== Early life ===
Henry Paul was born in Kingston, New York, and lived on a farm in nearby Hurley, but when his father and mother divorced, Paul, his sisters Anselma and Helen, and his mother moved to Temple Terrace, a suburb of Tampa, Florida, as a young boy. At the age of 17, he played his first music gigs at high school folk festivals and playing at the 18th String Coffee House and Music Emporium in Tampa. By 1969, he had moved back north to Greenwich Village, New York, to pursue a career in music. While living in New York, Paul retraced the footsteps of his hero Bob Dylan and played on the streets to make a living while cutting demos for Epic Records. With an invitation to play a concert in his hometown, he returned to Tampa in 1971. There, Paul and Jim Fish formed the country rock group Sienna with future Outlaw members Monte Yoho and Frank O'Keefe.

=== The Outlaws ===
In 1972, the group Sienna disbanded and Paul joined the group "The Outlaws" which had been formed in 1967. They started playing clubs around the Tampa area and added Billy Jones. By 1974, they were on the road opening shows for several established Southern rock groups including Lynyrd Skynyrd. Clive Davis of Arista Records discovered them and signed the group to their first record deal; they became the fledgling label's first rock band. Their self-titled debut album quickly went gold on the success of hits like "Green Grass and High Tides," and "There Goes Another Love Song." In 1977, after recording two more albums with the Outlaws, Paul left the band to pursue a solo career.

Following the death of Hughie Thomasson, Paul became the bandleader of The Outlaws in the first lineup to not include Thomasson since the formation of the band. In 2012, the Outlaws released the critically acclaimed album, It's About Pride. The band still tours extensively throughout the United States with the current lineup which includes Paul, Mike Bailey (drums), Randy Threet (bass guitar), Dave Robbins (keyboards), Jimmy Dormire (lead guitar) and Jeff Aulich (guitars).

=== Henry Paul Band ===
Within a year after leaving The Outlaws, Paul founded the Henry Paul Band, debuting in 1979 with the album Grey Ghost. It included songs such as "So Long" and "Grey Ghost", which was dedicated to the memory of Lynyrd Skynyrd's Ronnie Van Zant. He told Songfacts that he wrote "Lonely Dreamer" while visualizing a painting of a girl with the words "Lonely Dreamer" underneath. The band recorded three more albums including Feel The Heat in 1980, which had more of a rock edge and included the title track as well as "Whiskey Talkin'" and "Longshot" that went to number 3 on the Billboard Bubbling Under The Hot 100 Singles Chart in 1980. Their third album was released in 1981, Anytime, included the hit "Keeping Our Love Alive", number 50 on the Billboard Hot 100 and number 23 on Billboard Top Tracks (Mainstream Rock Tracks Chart) in 1982, with background vocals by Richard Paige of Mr. Mister and Bill Champlin of Chicago. The album also featured a non-charted single "Living Without Your Love" that was played on some album rock stations, cover version of Van Morrison's "Brown Eyed Girl", a number 5 Billboard Bubbling Under The Hot 100 in 1982, and a live show highlight "Crazy Eyes". Henry Paul Band's fourth and final self-titled album was released in 1982, featuring the songs "Hold On", Heat Of The Night" and the haunting song "Tragedy".

During the Henry Paul Band era, Paul also did voice-over work at WYNF-FM (95ynf) in Tampa Bay, Florida.

In 1983, the Henry Paul Band disbanded as Paul reunited with Hughie Thomasson of the Outlaws. Their collaboration led to the 1986 release of The Outlaws' Soldiers of Fortune. Paul remained with the band until 1989, when he left again to start a new career in country music, founding BlackHawk in 1991. Van Stephenson and Dave Robbins joined Paul in BlackHawk to create a new blend of country music, using three-part harmonies and introspective songs.

=== Blackhawk ===
BlackHawk's number 11 debut, "Goodbye Says It All", was heavily promoted on CMT during 1994. Following the platinum success of their self-titled debut album, they developed into a touring band. They have produced five studio albums, BlackHawk, Strong Enough, Love & Gravity, The Sky's the Limit, Spirit Dancer and one compilation album, Greatest Hits. They were nominated for Top New Vocal Group or Duet by the Academy of Country Music in 1994, but lost to Gibson/Miller Band. In 2002, the group left Arista for Columbia Records, with one album — 2002's Spirit Dancer — being released on that label. The 2008 lineup was signed to Radiance Records. In July 2014, BlackHawk released its first studio album in 12 years, Brothers of the Southland. The title track was a tribute to Southern rock bands and all those who have died.

== Discography ==
=== with Outlaws ===
- Outlaws (1975)
- Lady in Waiting (1976)
- Hurry Sundown (1977)
- Soldiers of Fortune (1986)
- It's About Pride (2012)
- Legacy Live (2016)
- Dixie Highway (2020)

=== with The Henry Paul Band ===
- Grey Ghost (1979)
- Feel the Heat (1980)
- Anytime (1981)

=== Solo ===
- Henry Paul (1982)

=== with BlackHawk ===
- Blackhawk (1994)
- Strong Enough (1995)
- Love & Gravity (1997)
- The Sky's the Limit (1998)
- Spirit Dancer (2002)
- Down from the Mountain (2011)
- Brothers of the Southland (2014)
- Greatest Hits & More (2014)
- Blue Highway (2022)
