= Green Grass and High Tides =

Song by Outlaws

from the album Outlaws
- Released: 1975
- Genre: Southern rock, hard rock
- Length: 9:49
- Label: Arista
- Songwriter: Hughie Thomasson
- Producer: Paul A. Rothchild

Music video
- "Green Grass and High Tides" on YouTube

"Green Grass and High Tides" is a song by American Southern rock band Outlaws. It is the tenth and final track on the band's debut album, Outlaws. The song is one of their best known, and has received extensive play on album-oriented radio stations, although it was never released as a single and is considered to be underrated by Henry Paul. The song is notable for having two extended guitar solos that stretch the song to nearly 10 minutes.

Outlaws founding member Hughie Thomasson said:

I wrote that song in St. Augustine, Florida. We went to a cookout on the beach and everybody forgot to bring their guitars. I was standing by the ocean and there was a breeze and the words kept coming to me. It’s about all the rock stars I liked that died had come back and were playing a show just for me. Like Jimi Hendrix, Janis Joplin and Jim Morrison. And eventually more of course.

Henry Paul told Songfacts that this song is not about marijuana, but about deceased rock and roll luminaries, and the title, he says, was taken from the 1966 "Best Of" collection by the Rolling Stones called Big Hits (High Tide and Green Grass):

From what I gather, there was an album out, the best of The Rolling Stones, called High Tide and Green Grass. That was the name of the Rolling Stones' greatest hits—this is like 1966—and I think it was a manifestation of that title turned in reverse, 'Green Grass and High Tides.' I know that much. And I know that it was a song written for rock and roll illuminaries, from Janis Joplin to Jimi Hendrix, and it had nothing to do with marijuana. But it had to do with, I think, a specific person's [Thomasson's] lyrical look at rock and roll legends. 'As kings and queens bow and play for you.' It's about Jimi Hendrix and Janis Joplin. 'Castles of stone, soul and glory.' A lot of it is just sort of a collage of words that really don't have all that much to do with anything, they just fit and sounded right. But I have to say it's one of my favorite lyrics. My songwriting is more Steinbeck, really rooted in accuracy and reality; this is definitely Alice In Wonderland. It's the whole 'White Rabbit.' It's sort of like one of those magic lyrical moments that will forever be mysteriously, unclearly conceived.

"Green Grass and High Tides" was the usual show closer for the Outlaws and the 20 minute+ version can be found on the concert album Bring It Back Alive (1978).

The Song was featured within Season 2 Episode 12 of Breaking Bad 'Phoenix', featuring as background music during a bar scene.
