= Billy Jones (Outlaws guitarist) =

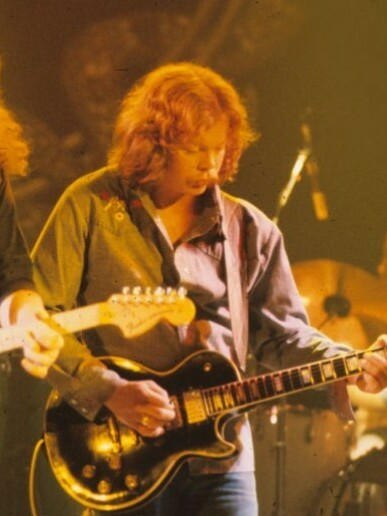
- Jones performing with The Outlaws

Background information
- Also known as: Billy Jones
- Born: William Harry Jones; November 20, 1949; Ann Arbor, Michigan, US
- Died: February 7, 1995 (aged 45) Spring Hill, Florida, US
- Genres: Southern rock, hard rock, blues-rock
- Occupations: Musician, songwriter
- Instruments: Guitar, keyboards, vocals
- Years active: 1971–81
- Label: Arista
- Formerly of: Outlaws
- Website: outlawsmusic.com

William Harry Jones (November 20, 1949 – February 7, 1995) was an American guitarist and singer best known as a founding member of the Outlaws.

Jones was a major contributor to the discography and commercial success of the Outlaws. Hughie Thomasson invited him to join the Outlaws after seeing him perform.

Jones grew up in Tampa, Florida, but lived for a long time in Boulder, Colorado. While in high school, he was a track star, holding the record in the 440-yard dash.

A talented musician, he played drums, keyboards, and guitar. He was offered a scholarship to Juilliard School of Music but turned it down, electing to attend the University of South Florida. He was a math major and graduated near the top of his class. He taught and tutored math for a while and contemplated teaching full-time, but music was Jones's calling.

He recorded one album with a band called H.Y. Sledge before joining Outlaws. He was initially brought on as a keyboardist but soon switched to lead guitar, helping crystallize the trademark Outlaws sound.

After touring the Outlaws hit album Ghost Riders, he was asked to leave the band due to substance abuse.

In February 1995, Jones died of a self-inflicted gunshot wound to the head.
