= Hughie Thomasson =

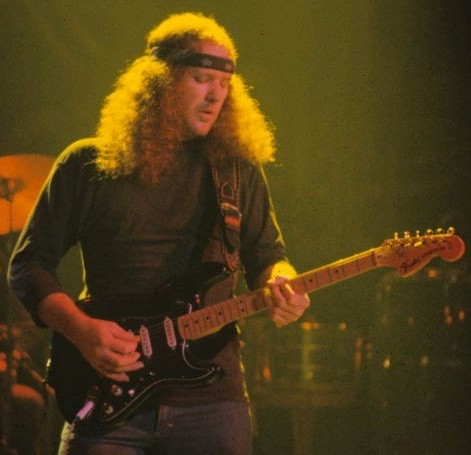
- Thomasson performing in the 1970s

Background information
- Born: Hugh Edward Thomasson Jr. August 13, 1952; Buchanan, Virginia, U.S.
- Died: September 9, 2007 (aged 55) Brooksville, Florida, U.S.
- Genres: Southern rock, hard rock, blues rock
- Occupations: Musician, songwriter
- Instruments: Guitar, vocals, banjo
- Years active: 1967–2007
- Label: Arista
- Website: https://www.outlawsmusic.com/

Hugh Edward "Hughie" Thomasson Jr. (August 13, 1952 – September 9, 2007) was an American guitarist and singer, best known as a founding member of Outlaws. The band found success in the late 1970s and early 1980s with a string of hits. He was also a replacement guitarist for Lynyrd Skynyrd. Hughie Thomasson was inducted into the Fender Hall of Fame for his work as the founding guitarist and singer of the southern rock band The Outlaws. His distinctive guitar playing earned him the nickname "The Flame".

== Biography ==
Thomasson wrote many of the songs for the Outlaws, including most of their more popular songs like "Hurry Sundown", "There Goes Another Love Song," and "Green Grass and High Tides". After Outlaws disbanded, Thomasson joined Lynyrd Skynyrd, first appearing on their 1997 album Twenty, leaving that band in 2005 to reform Outlaws. Before his death, he contributed to writing many of Lynyrd Skynyrd's songs on their 2009 album God & Guns, including the single "Still Unbroken."

Hughie Thomasson was inducted into the Fender Hall of Fame for his guitar work. He was known for his distinctive Fender guitar sound, often a Stratocaster, which combined a country-style feel with fluid blues licks. His legacy was celebrated in his home state of Florida. Hughie was also inducted into the Florida Rock and Roll Hall of Fame.

Guitar style: Thomasson's style was characterized by his use of Fender guitars, most famously the Stratocaster, to create a unique blend of country and blues, earning him the nickname "The Flame" for his fast guitar solos.

Thomasson died in his sleep on September 9, 2007, of a heart attack in his home in Brooksville, Florida. He was 55 years old.
