= Southern rock =

Subgenre of rock music and a genre of Americana

- Stylistic origins: Rock and roll; blues; country
- Cultural origins: 1960s and early 1970s, Southern United States

Fusion genres
- Southern metal

Regional scenes
- Southern United States

Other topics
- Alternative country; blues rock; country rock; cowpunk; heartland rock; outlaw country; progressive country; roots rock; sludge metal; Southern soul; swamp rock

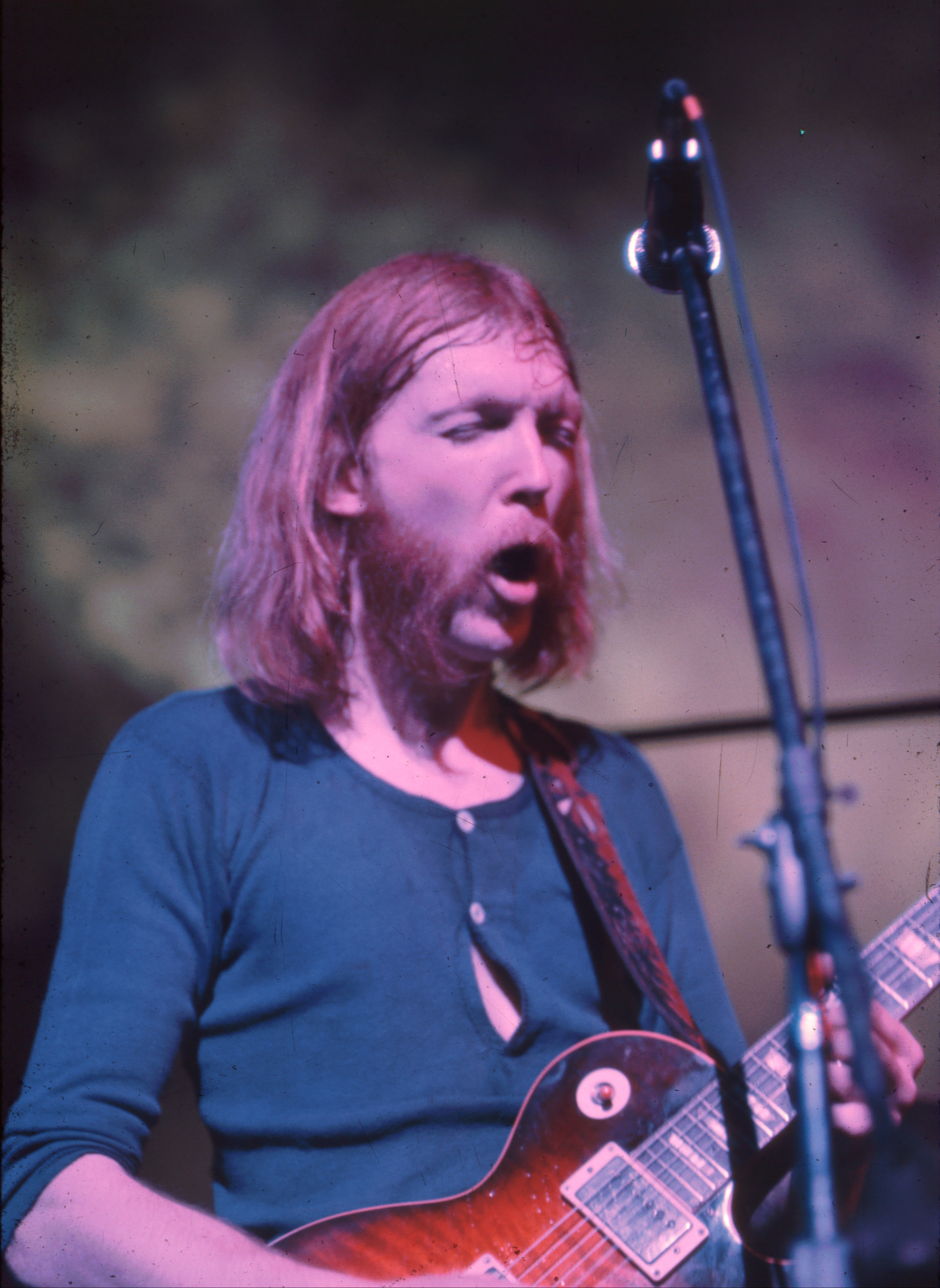
Duane Allman of The Allman Brothers Band performing in 1971.

Southern rock is a subgenre of rock music and a genre of Americana. It developed in the Southern United States from rock and roll, country and blues, and is focused generally on electric guitars and vocals.

== History ==
=== 1950s and 1960s: origins ===
Southern rock's origins lie mostly in the blues, country and rock music of the American South. Many stars from the first wave of 1950s rock and roll such as Bo Diddley, Elvis Presley, Little Richard, Fats Domino, and Jerry Lee Lewis hailed from the Deep South. However, the British Invasion and the rise of folk rock and psychedelic rock in the middle 1960s shifted the focus of new rock music away from the rural south and to large cities like Liverpool, London, Los Angeles, New York City, and San Francisco.

In the 1960s, rock musician Lonnie Mack blended black and white roots-music genres within the framework of rock, beginning with the hit song "Memphis" in 1963. Music historian Dick Shurman considers Mack's recordings from that era "a prototype of what later could be called Southern rock". Late 1960s, The Box Tops, Sir Douglas Quintet, and Dale Hawkins were popular in southern states.

The Allman Brothers Band, from Jacksonville, Florida, made their national debut in 1969 and soon gained a loyal following. Duane Allman's playing on the two Hour Glass albums and an Hour Glass session in early 1968 at FAME Studios in Muscle Shoals, Alabama had caught the ear of Rick Hall, owner of FAME.

In November 1968, Hall hired Allman to play on an album with Wilson Pickett. Allman's work on that album, Hey Jude (1968), got him hired as a full-time session musician at Muscle Shoals and brought him to the attention of a number of other musicians, such as Eric Clapton, who later related how he heard Pickett's version of "Hey Jude" on his car radio and called Atlantic Records to find out who the guitarist was: "To this day," Clapton said, "I've never heard better rock guitar playing on an R&B record. It's the best."

In the early 1970s, popular musicians in the southern area included Creedence Clearwater Revival (from California), Delaney & Bonnie, Janis Joplin, Leon Russell, and Tony Joe White.

Charlie Daniels' self-titled debut album, released in 1970, was a pivotal recording in the development of the Southern rock genre, "because it points the way to how the genre could and would sound, and how country music could retain its hillbilly spirit and rock like a mother," according to Stephen Thomas Erlewine. Erlewine described Daniels as "a redneck rebel, not fitting into either the country or the rock & roll [...] but, in retrospect, he sounds like a visionary, pointing the way to the future when southern rockers saw no dividing lines between rock, country, and blues, and only saw it all as sons of the south."

Daniels later formed the Charlie Daniels Band, a group which fused rock, country, blues, and jazz. Erlewine described the band's sound as "a distinctly Southern blend" which emphasized improvisation in their instrumentation. After the success of "The Devil Went Down to Georgia", a single which Erlewine described as a "roaring country-disco fusion", Daniels shifted his sound from rock to country music and "helped shape the sound of country-rock".

Author Scott B. Bomar speculates the term "Southern rock" may have been coined in 1972 by Mo Slotin, writing for Atlanta's underground newspaper, The Great Speckled Bird, in a review of an Allman Brothers Band concert.

=== 1970s: peak of popularity ===
Duane Allman was killed in a motorcycle accident in 1971. The blues rock sound of Allman Brothers Band incorporated long jams informed by jazz and also drew from native elements of country and folk. They were also contemporary in their electric guitar and keyboard delivery. Gregg Allman commented that all rock 'n' roll music started in the southern United States, and that "Southern rock" was a redundant term, like just calling it "rock rock".

The Marshall Tucker Band, from Spartanburg, South Carolina, opened many of The Allman Brothers Band concerts using elements of blues, country, rock and jazz in their music. They also collaborated with Charlie Daniels. Their self-titled album, released in 1973, included the hit "Can't You See". Perhaps known best for the single "Fire on the Mountain," the Marshall Tucker Band hit "Heard it in a Love Song" charted in 1977.

Lynyrd Skynyrd of Jacksonville, Florida, is known for "Free Bird", "Sweet Home Alabama", "Saturday Night Special", and "What's Your Name". They played British hard rock-influenced music until the deaths of lead singer Ronnie Van Zant and two other members of the group in a 1977 airplane crash. After this tragic plane crash, members Allen Collins and Gary Rossington started the Rossington Collins Band. Other 1970s Southern rock bands include Wet Willie, the Atlanta Rhythm Section, ZZ Top, Black Oak Arkansas, Cowboy, Potliquor, Roy Buchanan, Barefoot Jerry,Grinderswitch, Sea Level, Blackfoot, Johnny Winter, and the Edgar Winter Group.

=== 1980s and 1990s: continuing influence ===
By the beginning of the 1980s, the Allman Brothers Band and Lynyrd Skynyrd had disbanded, and Capricorn Records had gone bankrupt. Leading acts of the genre (in particular, 38 Special) had become enmeshed in arena rock. With the rise of 80s MTV, new wave, heavy metal, synth pop, and urban contemporary, most surviving Southern rock groups were relegated to secondary or regional venues. Rock musicians such as Molly Hatchet, Outlaws, Georgia Satellites, the Fabulous Thunderbirds, Jimmie Vaughan, Point Blank, Tom Petty, Bruce Hornsby, Steve Earle, Arc Angels, Dangerous Toys, Artimus Pyle, and Kentucky Headhunters, emerged as popular Southern bands across the southeastern United States during the 1980s and 1990s.

During the 1990s, the Allman Brothers reunited and became a strong touring and recording presence again, and the jam band scene revived interest in extended improvised music.

The 1990s also saw the Black Crowes rise to mainstream popularity with the releases of Shake Your Money Maker (3× platinum), the Southern Harmony and Musical Companion (debut at #1 on the Billboard 200 and certified 2× platinum), and Amorica (certified Gold).

=== 2000s to present ===
New musicians such as the Tedeschi Trucks Band (and before that the Derek Trucks Band), Warren Haynes, Gov't Mule, Chris Duarte Group, the Allman Betts Band, Blackberry Smoke, Whiskey Myers, the Black Crowes, Widespread Panic, Kid Rock, and Rurally Bankrupt are continuing the Southern rock art form.

In 2005, singer Bo Bice took an explicitly Southern rock sensibility and appearance to a runner-up finish on the normally pop-oriented American Idol television program, with a performance of the Allmans' "Whipping Post" and later performing Skynyrd's "Free Bird" and, with Skynyrd on stage with him, "Sweet Home Alabama".

Southern rock currently plays on the radio in the United States, but mostly on oldies stations and classic rock stations. Although this class of music gets minor radio play, there is still a following for older bands like Lynyrd Skynyrd and the Allman Brothers play in venues with sizable crowds.

A number of books in the 2000s have chronicled Southern rock's history, including Randy Poe's Skydog: The Duane Allman Story and Rolling Stone writer Mark Kemp's Dixie Lullaby: A Story of Music, Race & New Beginnings in a New South. Turn It Up was released by Ron Eckerman, Lynyrd Skynyrd's former manager and plane crash survivor. Sociologist Jason T. Eastman analyzes contemporary Southern rock to illustrate changes in today's southern identity in his book The Southern Rock Revival: The Old South in a New World.

Southern rock has been propelled by record labels like Capitol Records Nashville, Mercury Nashville and Lost Highway Records.

== Southern metal ==
Southern metal
- Stylistic origins: Southern rock; heavy metal
- Cultural origins: 1990s, Southern United States

Regional scenes
- Southern United States

Other topics
- Country metal

Southern metal is a fusion genre combining Southern rock with heavy metal music. It appeared in the 1990s and is performed by bands such as Corrosion of Conformity, Black Label Society, Maylene and the Sons of Disaster and Texas Hippie Coalition.

== See also ==
- Country rock
- Heartland rock
- List of southern rock bands
- Roots rock
- Southern Rock Gold
- Swamp rock
- Tulsa sound

== General and cited references ==
- Patoski, Joe Nick (1980). "Southern Rock". The Rolling Stone Illustrated History of Rock & Roll. New York: Random House. ISBN 0-394-73938-8.
- Kemp, Mark (2004). Dixie Lullaby: A Story of Music, Race and New Beginnings in a New South. New York: Free Press/Simon & Schuster. ISBN 0-7432-3794-3.
