= List of country rock albums =

== 1964 ==
- The Holy Modal Rounders: The Holy Modal Rounders

== 1965 ==
- The Holy Modal Rounders: The Holy Modal Rounders 2
- June 1965 The Byrds Mr. Tambourine Man
- December 1965 The Byrds Turn! Turn! Turn!

== 1966 ==
- May 1966 Rick Nelson Bright Lights & Country Music
- May 1966 Bob Dylan Blonde on Blonde
- July 1966 The Byrds Fifth Dimension
- Dec 1966 Buffalo Springfield Buffalo Springfield

== 1967 ==
- The Holy Modal Rounders: Indian War Whoop
- Feb 1967 Gene Clark: Gene Clark with the Gosdin Brothers
- Feb 1967 The Byrds Younger Than Yesterday
- Feb 1967 Jerry Reed The Unbelievable Guitar and Voice of Jerry Reed
- April 1967 Rick Nelson: Country Fever
- April 1967 The Nitty Gritty Dirt Band The Nitty Gritty Dirt Band
- May 1967 Kenny Rogers and The First Edition: The First Edition
- Jul 1967 The Beau Brummels: Triangle
- Nov 1967 Buffalo Springfield: Buffalo Springfield Again
- Dec 1967 Bob Dylan: John Wesley Harding (recorded Oct–Nov 1967)

== 1968 ==
- The Holy Modal Rounders: The Moray Eels Eat The Holy Modal Rounders
- The Dillards: Wheatstraw Suite
- Jan 1968 The Everly Brothers: Roots
- Jan 1968 The Byrds: The Notorious Byrd Brothers
- July 1968 The International Submarine Band: Safe at Home (recorded July 1967)
- July 1968 Buffalo Springfield: Last Time Around
- July 1968 The Byrds: Sweetheart of the Rodeo (recorded Mar–May 1968)
- July 1968 The Band: Music from Big Pink
- July 1968 Creedence Clearwater Revival: Creedence Clearwater Revival (rec. Oct 1967–Feb 1968)
- Oct 1968 Dillard & Clark: The Fantastic Expedition of Dillard & Clark
- Oct 1968 The Beau Brummels: Bradley's Barn
- Oct 1968 Brewer & Shipley: Down in L.A.
- Nov 1968 Neil Young: Neil Young

== 1969 ==
- 1969 Mason Proffit Wanted
- 1969 Brewer & Shipley: Weeds
- Jan 1969 Creedence Clearwater Revival Bayou Country
- Jan 1969 Moby Grape: Moby Grape '69
- Jan 1969 Jerry Lee Lewis Another Place, Another Time
- Feb 1969 The Flying Burrito Brothers: The Gilded Palace of Sin
- Feb 1969 Ian Matthews: Matthews' Southern Comfort
- Feb 1969 Buffalo Springfield: Retrospective: The Best of Buffalo Springfield
- Mar 1969 The Byrds: Dr. Byrds & Mr. Hyde
- Mar 1969 Linda Ronstadt: Hand Sown ... Home Grown
- Apr 1969 Bob Dylan: Nashville Skyline
- Apr 1969 Sir Douglas Quintet: Mendocino
- May 1969 Elvis Presley: From Elvis in Memphis
- May 1969 Neil Young: Everybody Knows This Is Nowhere
- May 1969 Crosby, Stills & Nash: Crosby, Stills & Nash
- May 1969 John Stewart: California Bloodlines
- June 1969 Poco: Pickin' Up the Pieces
- June 1969 Johnny Cash At San Quentin
- July 1969 Area Code 615: Area Code 615
- July 1969 Moby Grape: Truly Fine Citizen
- July 1969 Delaney & Bonnie: The Original Delaney & Bonnie & Friends
- Aug 1969 Creedence Clearwater Revival Green River
- Aug 1969 Dillard & Clark: Through the Morning Through the Night
- Sep 1969 The Band: The Band
- Oct 1969 The Byrds: Ballad of Easy Rider
- Nov 1969 Steve Young: Rock Salt & Nails
- Nov 1969 Creedence Clearwater Revival Willy and the Poor Boys

== 1970 ==
- 1970 The Dillards: Copperfields
- 1970 Rick Nelson: In Concert at the Troubadour, 1969 (rec. Dec. 1969)
- 1970 Rick Nelson: Rick Sings Nelson
- 1970 Swampwater: Swampwater (One Way Records)
- Jan 1970 John Phillips: John Phillips (John, the Wolf King of L.A.)
- Jan 1970 Brewer & Shipley: Tarkio
- Feb 1970 Phil Ochs Greatest Hits
- Feb 1970 Nitty Gritty Dirt Band: Uncle Charlie & His Dog Teddy
- Feb 1970 Kenny Rogers & The First Edition: Something's Burning
- Mar 1970 Linda Ronstadt: Silk Purse
- April 1970 Great Speckled Bird: Great Speckled Bird
- April 1970 The Flying Burrito Brothers: Burrito Deluxe
- May 1970 Poco: Poco
- Jun 1970 Grateful Dead: Workingman's Dead
- July 1970 Michael Nesmith: Magnetic South
- July 1970 Creedence Clearwater Revival: Cosmo's Factory
- Aug 1970 The Band: Stage Fright
- Aug 1970 Neil Young: After the Gold Rush
- Sep 1970 Ringo Starr: Beaucoups of Blues
- Sep 1970 The Byrds: Untitled
- Sep 1970 Rick Nelson: Rick Sings Nelson
- Oct 1970 Bob Dylan: New Morning
- Nov 1970 Michael Nesmith: Loose Salute
- Nov 1970 Elvis Presley: Back in Memphis
- Nov 1970 Grateful Dead: American Beauty
- Dec 1970 Ry Cooder: Ry Cooder
- Dec 1970 Creedence Clearwater Revival: Pendulum

== 1971 ==
- 1971 Linda Ronstadt: Linda Ronstadt
- 1971 Mason Proffit: Movin' Toward Happiness
- 1971 Mason Proffit: Last Night I Had the Strangest Dream
- 1971 Brewer & Shipley: Shake Off The Demon
- Jan 1971 Elvis Presley: Elvis Country (I'm 10,000 Years Old)
- Jan 1971 Poco: Deliverin'
- Mar 1971 New Riders of the Purple Sage: New Riders of the Purple Sage
- Mar 1971: Black Oak Arkansas: Black Oak Arkansas
- Mar 1971 Delaney & Bonnie: Motel Shot
- April 1971 Commander Cody and His Lost Planet Airmen: Lost in the Ozone
- May 1971 Michael Nesmith: Nevada Fighter
- May 1971 Johnny Cash Man in Black
- June 1971 The Byrds: Byrdmaniax
- June 1971 The Flying Burrito Brothers: The Flying Burrito Brothers
- Aug 1971 Gene Clark: White Light
- Sep 1971 Poco: From the Inside
- Sep 1971 John Hartford: Aereo-Plain
- Nov 1971 Rick Nelson Rudy the Fifth
- Dec 1971 The Byrds: Farther Along

== 1972 ==
- 1972 Kenny Rogers & The First Edition The Ballad of Calico
- 1972 Mason Proffit: Rockfish Crossing
- 1972 The Nitty Gritty Dirt Band: Will The Circle Be Unbroken?
- 1972 Brewer & Shipley Rural Space
- Jan 1972 Steve Young: Seven Bridges Road
- Feb 1972 Neil Young: Harvest
- Feb 1972 Ry Cooder Into the Purple Valley
- Feb 1972 Michael Nesmith: Tantamount to Treason Vol. 1
- Mar 1972 Everly Brothers: Stories We Could Tell
- Mar 1972 Rick Nelson: Garden Party
- Mar 1972 Pure Prairie League: Pure Prairie League
- Mar 1972 New Riders of the Purple Sage: Powerglide
- Apr 1972 Manassas: Manassas
- Apr 1972 Creedence Clearwater Revival: Mardi Gras
- May 1972 Barefoot Jerry: Barefoot Jerry
- June 1972 Eagles: Eagles
- Aug 1972 Michael Nesmith: And the Hits Just Keep on Comin'
- Aug 1972 Pure Prairie League: Bustin' Out
- Oct 1972 Gene Clark: Roadmaster (recorded 1970–72)
- Nov 1972 Poco: A Good Feelin’ To Know
- Nov 1972 Ry Cooder Boomer's Story
- Dec 1972 Ian Matthews: Journeys from Gospel Oak

== 1973 ==
- 1973 Linda Hargrove: Music Is Your Mistress
- 1973 Mason Proffit: Bare Back Rider
- 1973 John Kay: My Sportin' Life
- 1973 Lilyリリィ: Dulcimer- Nothing By Mouth = ダルシマ ＜なにも伝わないで＞
- Jan 1973 Gram Parsons: GP
- Jan 1973 Doug Sahm Doug Sahm and Band
- Mar 1973 The Byrds: Byrds
- Mar 1973 John Fogerty The Blue Ridge Rangers
- Apr 1973 Ozark Mountain Daredevils: Ozark Mountain Daredevils
- Apr 1973 Eagles: Desperado
- Apr 1973 The Marshall Tucker Band: The Marshall Tucker Band
- Sep 1973 Poco: Crazy Eyes
- Sep 1973 Leon Russell: Hank Wilson's Back Vol. I
- Oct 1973 Masa Takagi 高木麻早: Masa Takagi 高木麻早
- Oct 1973 Michael Nesmith: Pretty Much Your Standard Ranch Stash
- Oct 1973 Neil Young: Time Fades Away
- Nov 1973 Alvin Lee & Mylon LeFevre: On the Road to Freedom
- Nov 1973 Ian Matthews: Valley Hi
- Nov 1973 Gene Parsons: Kindling
- Dec 1973 New Riders of the Purple Sage: The Adventures of Panama Red

== 1974 ==
- 1974 Mason Proffit: Come And Gone
- 1974 Souther–Hillman–Furay Band: The Souther–Hillman–Furay Band
- 1974 Brewer & Shipley ST11261
- Jan 1974 Gram Parsons: Grievous Angel
- Jan 1974 Rick Nelson: Windfall
- Jan 1974 Linda Ronstadt: Different Drum
- Mar 1974 Eagles: On the Border
- Apr 1974 Poco: Seven
- May 1974 Masa Takagi 高木麻早: Masa 麻早
- May 1974 The Marshall Tucker Band: A New Life
- May 1974 Ry Cooder Paradise and Lunch
- Jul 1974 The Flying Burrito Brothers: Close Up the Honky Tonks
- July 1974 Neil Young: On the Beach
- Sep 1974 Gene Clark: No Other
- Sep 1974 Richard Betts: Highway Call
- Sep 1974 Masa Takagi 高木麻早: Take A Ten
- Oct 1974 Ozark Mountain Daredevils: It'll Shine When It Shines
- Nov 1974 Linda Ronstadt: Heart Like a Wheel
- Nov 1974 Poco: Cantamos

== 1975 ==
- 1975 Souther-Hillman-Furay Band: Trouble in Paradise
- 1975 The Ozark Mountain Daredevils: The Car Over the Lake Album
- 1975 Amazing Rhythm Aces: Stacked Deck
- 1975 Brinsley Schwarz: Nervous on the Road/The New Favourites of Brinsley Schwarz
- 1975 Spanky And Our Gang: Change
- Jan 1975 Elvis Presley Promised Land
- Mar 1975 The Outlaws: The Outlaws
- Mar 1975 Pure Prairie League: Two Lane Highway
- Jun 1975 Neil Young: Tonight's the Night (recorded 1973)
- Jun 1975 Bob Dylan & The Band: The Basement Tapes (recorded June–Sep 1967)
- Jul 1975 Poco: Head over Heels
- Jul 1975 Masa Takagi 高木麻早: Door to the Heart こころの扉
- Sep 1975 Poco: The Very Best of Poco
- Sep 1975 John Fogerty: John Fogerty
- Oct 1975 The Flying Burrito Brothers: Flying Again
- Oct 1975 Emmylou Harris: Pieces of the Sky
- Nov 1975 Charlie Daniels: Fire on the Mountain

== 1976 ==
- 1976 The Outlaws: Lady in Waiting
- 1976 The Ozark Mountain Daredevils: Men From Earth
- 1976 Firefall: Firefall
- 1976 Amazing Rhythm Aces: Too Stuffed to Jump
- 1976 American Flyer: American Flyer
- 1976 New Riders of the Purple Sage: The Best of New Riders of the Purple Sage
- 1976 Brewer & Shipley: Welcome To Riddle Bridge
- 1976 Nitty Gritty Dirt Band: Dirt, Silver and Gold
- Jan 1976 Pure Prairie League: If the Shoe Fits
- Feb 1976 Eagles: Their Greatest Hits (1971–1975)
- Mar 1976 The Charlie Daniels Band: Saddle Tramp
- Jun 1976 The Flying Burrito Brothers: Airborne
- Oct 1976 Poco: Rose of Cimarron
- Nov 1976 The Charlie Daniels Band: High Lonesome
- Nov 1976 Pure Prairie League: Dance
- Nov 1976 Poco: Live

== 1977 ==
- 1977 Daniel Amos Shotgun Angel
- 1977 Firefall: Luna Sea
- 1977 The Outlaws: Hurry Sundown
- 1977 The Ozark Mountain Daredevils: Don't Look Down
- 1977 Townes Van Zandt: Live at the Old Quarter, Houston, Texas
- 1977 Rick Nelson: Intakes
- Jan 1977 Jimmy Buffett: Changes in Latitudes, Changes in Attitudes
- Jan 1977 Emmylou Harris: Luxury Liner
- Jan 1977 Gene Clark: Two Sides to Every Story (recorded 1976)
- Mar 1977 Michael Nesmith: From A Radio Engine To The Photon Wing
- May 1977 Poco: Indian Summer
- Aug 1977 Pure Prairie League: Live ! Takin' The Stage
- Dec 1977 Jackson Browne: Running on Empty

== 1978 ==
- 1978 Firefall: Elan
- 1978 Juice Newton: Well Kept Secret
- 1978 The Ozark Mountain Daredevils: It's Alive!
- 1978 Toby Beau: Toby Beau
- 1978 Joe Ely: Honky Tonk Masquerade
- Oct 1978 Neil Young: Comes a Time

== 1979 ==
- 1979 Hoyt Axton: A Rusty Old Halo
- 1979 Clover: Chronicle
- Apr 1979 Charlie Daniels Band: Million Mile Reflections

== 1980 ==
- 1980 Amazing Rhythm Aces: How The Hell Do You Spell Rythum?
- 1980 Dirt Band: Make a Little Magic
- 1980 Firefall: Undertow
- 1980 Firefall: Clouds Across The Sun
- 1980 Hoyt Axton: Where Did the Money Go?
- 1980 The Outlaws: Ghost Riders
- 1980 The Ozark Mountain Daredevils: Ozark Mountain Daredevils
- 1980 Joe Ely: Live Shots
- 1980 Rita Coolidge: Greatest Hits
- Jul 1980 The Charlie Daniels Band: Full Moon

== 1981 ==
- Jul 1981 Poco: Blue and Gray
- Oct 1981 Elvis Costello & the Attractions: Almost Blue

== 1982 ==
- 1982 Jason & The Scorchers: Reckless Country Soul
- 1982 Juice Newton: Quiet Lies
- Feb 1982 Poco: Cowboys & Englishmen
- Sep 1982 Poco: Ghost Town

== 1983 ==
- Jun 1983 The Charlie Daniels Band: A Decade of Hits (Charlie Daniels album)

== 1985 ==
- 1985 Lone Justice: Lone Justice
- 1985 Jimmy Buffett: Songs You Know by Heart: Jimmy Buffett's Greatest Hit(s)
- Aug 1985 Nick Lowe & His Cowboy Outfit: The Rose of England

== 1986 ==
- 1986 Albert Lee: Country Guitar Man
- 1986 The Jayhawks: The Jayhawks
- Mar 1986 Steve Earle: Guitar Town

== 1987 ==
- 1987 The Beau Brummels: The Best of the Beau Brummels: Golden Archive Series
- Mar 1987 Blue Rodeo: Outskirts

== 1988 ==
- 1988 Various Artists: The Best of Shiloh & More, Vol. 1
- 1988 The Flying Burrito Brothers: Farther Along: The Best of the Flying Burrito Brothers
- Oct 1988 Steve Earle: Copperhead Road

== 1989 ==
- 1989 Nick Lowe: Basher: The Best of Nick Lowe

== 1990 ==
- 1990 Doug Sahm & the Sir Douglas Quintet: The Best of Doug Sahm & the Sir Douglas Quintet 1968–1975
- 1990 The Flatlanders: More a Legend Than a Band
- 1980 Commander Cody and His Lost Planet Airmen: Too Much Fun: Best of Commander Cody
- July 1990 Steve Earle: The Hard Way
- Oct 1990 Poco: The Forgotten Trail (1969–74)
- Nov 1990 Blue Rodeo: Casino

== 1991 ==
- 1991 The Dillards: There Is a Time (1963–70)
- 1991 Southern Pacific: Greatest Hits
- 1991 Brinsley Schwarz: Surrender to the Rhythm
- Jan 1991 Desert Rose Band: A Dozen Roses: Greatest Hits

== 1992 ==
- 1991 Firefall: Greatest Hits
- October 1992 Neil Young: Harvest Moon
- September 1992 The Jayhawks: Hollywood Town Hall
- October 1992 Michael Nesmith Tropical Campfires

== 1993 ==
- 1993 Rick Nelson: Stay Young
- 1993 Michael Nesmith: Complete First National Band Recordings

== 1994 ==
- Jul 1994 Eagles: The Very Best of the Eagles (1994)
- Nov 1994 Nick Lowe: The Impossible Bird

== 1995 ==
- 1995 The Marshall Tucker Band: The Best of the Marshall Tucker Band: The Capricorn Years
- 1995 Various Artists: Hillbilly Fever, Vol. 5: Legends of Country Rock
- 1995 Pure Prairie League: The Best of Pure Prairie League
- Feb 1995 Steve Earle: Train a Comin'

== 1996 ==
- 1996 Various Artists: Heroes of Country Music, Vol. 5: Legends of Country Rock
- Jul 1996 Steve Earle: Ain't Ever Satisfied: The Steve Earle Collection

== 1997 ==
- 1997 Gary Stewart: The Essential Gary Stewart
- 1997 Dan Hicks & His Hot Licks: Return to Hicksville: The Best of Dan Hicks & His Hot Licks—The Blue Thumb Years
- Jun 1997 Ozark Mountain Daredevils: 13
- Jul 1997 Neko Case and Her Boyfriends: The Virginian

== 1998 ==
- 1998 Gene Clark: Flying High
- 1998 Rick Nelson: Bright Lights & Country Music/Country Fever
- 1998 The Long Ryders: Anthology
- 1998 Alabama: For the Record
- 1998 Townes Van Zandt: Anthology: 1968–1979 (Charly)
- Nov 1998 Poco: The Ultimate Collection

== 1999 ==
- 1999 Michael Nesmith Live at the Britt Festival

== 2000s ==
- Feb 2000 The Byrds: Live at the Fillmore – February 1969
- Sep 2002 Beck: Sea Change
- Nov 2004 Neko Case: The Tigers Have Spoken
- May 2005 Ryan Adams & The Cardinals : Cold Roses
- Jun 2005 Joel Plaskett: La De Da
- Dec 2005 Pure Prairie League: All in Good Time
- Mar 2006 Neko Case: Fox Confessor Brings the Flood
- Mar 2006 The Little Willies: The Little Willies
- May 2006 David Allan Coe & Cowboys from Hell: Rebel Meets Rebel
- Jun 2007 Bon Jovi: Lost Highway
- Oct 2007 Robert Plant and Alison Krauss: Raising Sand
- Apr 2008 Mudcrutch: Mudcrutch
- Jun 2008 The Road Hammers: Blood Sweat & Steel
- Jul 2008 The Byrds: Live at Royal Albert Hall 1971
- Jul 2008 John Mellencamp: Life, Death, Love and Freedom
- Jun 2009 Deer Tick: Born on Flag Day
- Aug 2009 John Fogerty: The Blue Ridge Rangers Rides Again
- Oct 2009 Brantley Gilbert: A Modern Day Prodigal Son

== 2010s ==
- Sep 2010 Robert Plant: Band of Joy
- Sep 2011 Blitzen Trapper: American Goldwing
- Jan 2012 The Little Willies: For the Good Times
- Mar 2012 Brantley Gilbert: Halfway to Heaven
- May 2012 Dallas Smith: Jumped Right In
- June 2013 Rocky and the Natives: Let's Hear It For the Old Guys
- Oct 2013 Thomas Rhett: It Goes Like This
- May 2014 Brantley Gilbert: Just As I Am
- Jun 2014 The Road Hammers: Wheels
- Oct 2014 Florida Georgia Line: Anything Goes
- Nov 2014 Dallas Smith: Lifted
- May 2015 Cory Marks: This Man
- Jul 2016 Steven Tyler: We're All Somebody from Somewhere
- Jan 2017 Brantley Gilbert: The Devil Don't Sleep
- Dec 2017 Lit: These Are the Days
- Nov 2019 Jason Aldean: 9

== 2020s ==
- Aug 2020 Cory Marks: Who I Am
- Sep 2020 Hardy: A Rock
- Jan 2023 Hardy: The Mockingbird & the Crow
- Dec 2024 Cory Marks: Sorry for Nothing
- Oct 2025 Cory Marks: Sorry for Nothing, Vol. 2
