= Glyn Johns discography =

This is a discography of records (primarily albums) produced, engineered, and/or mixed by Glyn Johns for various acts. Though Johns is best known for his work as an engineer and producer for other artists, he recorded several singles as a solo act in the 1960s. At the end of this article, there is a brief section devoted to Johns' work as a solo artist.

== Albums (as producer, recording engineer, and/or mixing engineer) ==
Most information presented in this section is sourced and cited in the various connecting articles. However, as a minimum overriding baseline of verification, all selections presented here are also (unless otherwise indicated) listed in the discography compiled by Andrew Alburn on pp. 291–300 in Glyn Johns' autobiography, Sound Man and/or "Glyn Johns Credits" (AllMusic). (Note: The AllMusic discography includes Johns' most recent work as a producer and engineer. Its contents are generally reliable regarding his work as an engineer and producer for other artists. However, the material about Johns' solo career listed at the bottom of the AllMusic credits should be disregarded. He only cut several singles as a solo artist (in the 1960s) and did not make any albums in that capacity.)

Artist	Year	Album	Producer	Engineer	Mixing
Georgie Fame	1964	Rhythm and Blues at the Flamingo		check	check
The Rolling Stones	1965	December's Children		co-eng.	co-mix.
The Pretty Things	1965	Get the Picture?	co-prod.	check	check
The Rolling Stones	1965	Out of Our Heads		co-eng.	co-mix.
The Rolling Stones	1966	Aftermath		co-eng.	co-mix.
The Rolling Stones	1966	Got Live if You Want It!		check	check
Chris Farlowe	1966	The Art of Chris Farlowe		check	check
Small Faces	1966	Small Faces (Decca)		check	check
Chris Farlowe	1966	14 Things to Think About		check	check
Twice as Much	1966	Own Up		check	check
Small Faces	1967	From the Beginning		check	check
The Rolling Stones	1967	Between the Buttons		check	check
Small Faces	1967	Small Faces (Immediate)		check	check
The Rolling Stones	1967	Flowers		co-eng.	co-mix.
The Rolling Stones	1967	Their Satanic Majesties Request		check	check
Johnny Hallyday	1967	San Francisco (EP)		check	check
The Rolling Stones	1968	Beggars Banquet		check	check
Steve Miller Band	1968	Children of the Future	check	check	check
Twice as Much	1968	That's All		check	
The Pentangle	1968	The Pentangle		check	check
The Move	1968	Something Else from The Move		check	check
Spooky Tooth	1968	It's All About		check	check
Small Faces	1968	Ogdens' Nut Gone Flake		check	check
Steve Miller Band	1968	Sailor	check	check	check
Gerry Temple	1968	Burn Up!		check	
Procol Harum	1968	Shine on Brightly		check	check
The Move	1968	Move		check	check
The Easybeats	1968	Vigil		check	check
Traffic	1968	Traffic		check	check
Billy Nichols	1968	Would You Believe		check	check
Steve Miller Band	1969	Brave New World	check	check	check
Family	1969	Family Entertainment	check	check	check
The End	1969	Introspection		check	check
The Beatles	1969	Abbey Road		check	
Joe Cocker	1969	Joe Cocker!		check	check
Johnny Hallyday	1969	Johnny Hallyday	check	check	check
Led Zeppelin	1969	Led Zeppelin		check	
The Rolling Stones	1969	Let it Bleed		check	check
Steve Miller Band	1969	Your Saving Grace	check	check	check
Lambert and Nuttycombe	1970	At Home		check	check
Bob Dylan	1970	Self Portrait		co-eng.	
The Rolling Stones	1970	Get Yer Ya-Ya's Out!	check	check	check
Humble Pie	1970	Humble Pie	check	check	check
Philamore Lincoln	1970	The North Wind Blew South		check	
Billy Preston	1970	That's the Way God Planned It		check	check
Leon Russell	1970	Leon Russell		check	check
The Beatles	1970	Let It Be		check	
Joe Cocker	1970	Mad Dogs & Englishmen	check		check
Delaney & Bonnie & Friends	1970	On Tour with Eric Clapton		check	
The Move	1970	Shazam		check	check
The Band	1970	Stage Fright		co-eng.	
Spooky Tooth	1970	The Last Puff		check	check
McGuinness Flint	1970	McGuinness Flint	check	check	check
Faces	1971	A Nod Is As Good As a Wink... to a Blind Horse	check	check	check
Boz Scaggs	1971	Moments	check	check	check
Ben Sidran	1971	Feel Your Groove		check	check
McGuinness Flint	1971	Happy Birthday, Ruthie Baby	check	check	check
Jesse Ed Davis	1971	¡Jesse Davis!	check	check	check
Leon Russell	1971	Leon Russell and the Shelter People		check	check
Boz Scaggs	1971	Boz Scaggs & Band	check	check	check
Rita Coolidge	1971	Nice Feelin'		check	
Howlin' Wolf	1971	The London Howlin' Wolf Sessions		check	
Humble Pie	1971	Rock On	check	check	check
Graham Nash	1971	Songs for Beginners			check
The Rolling Stones	1971	Sticky Fingers		co-eng.	co-mix.
Spooky Tooth	1971	Tobacco Road		check	check
The Who	1971	Who's Next	co-prod.	check	check
Eagles	1972	Eagles	check	check	check
The Rolling Stones	1972	Exile on Main St.		co-eng.	co-mix.
Rita Coolidge	1972	The Lady's Not for Sale	check	check	check
Neil Young	1972	Harvest		co-eng.	
Nicky Hopkins, Ry Cooder, Mick Jagger, Bill Wyman, and Charlie Watts	1972	Jamming with Edward!	check	check	check
Chris Jagger	1973	Chris Jagger		check	
Eagles	1973	Desperado	check	check	check
Eric Clapton	1973	Eric Clapton's Rainbow Concert		check	
The Faces	1973	Ooh La La	check	check	check
The Who	1973	Quadrophenia	co-prod.	co-eng.	
Ric Grech	1973	The Last Five Years	check	check	check
Paul McCartney and Wings	1973	Red Rose Speedway		co-eng.	
Gallagher and Lyle	1973	Seeds	check	check	check
The Ozark Mountain Daredevils	1973	The Ozark Mountain Daredevils	co-prod.	check	check
Gallagher and Lyle	1973	Willie and the Lapdog	check	check	check
The Ozark Mountain Daredevils	1974	It'll Shine When It Shines	co-prod.	check	check
The Rolling Stones	1974	It's Only Rock 'n Roll			check
Eagles	1974	On the Border	co-prod.	co-eng.	
Gallagher and Lyle	1974	The Last Cowboy	check	check	check
Georgie Fame	1974	Georgie Fame	check	check	check
Fairport Convention	1975	Rising for the Moon	check	check	check
The Who	1975	The Who by Numbers	check	check	check
Andy Fairweather Low	1976	Be Bop 'n' Holla	check	check	check
Fools Gold	1976	Fools Gold	check	check	check
Joan Armatrading	1976	Joan Armatrading	check	check	check
Ron Wood & Ronnie Lane	1976	Mahoney's Last Stand	check	check	check
The Rolling Stones	1976	Black and Blue		co-eng.	
Buckacre	1976	Morning Comes	check	check	check
The Bernie Leadon—Michael Georgiades Band	1977	Natural Progressions	check	check	check
Pete Townshend & Ronnie Lane	1977	Rough Mix	check	check	check
Joan Armatrading	1977	Show Some Emotion	check	check	check
Eric Clapton	1977	Slowhand	check	check	check
Eric Clapton	1977	Backless	check	check	check
Craig Nuttycombe	1977	It's Just a Lifetime	check	check	check
Joan Armatrading	1978	To the Limit	check	check	check
Paul Kennerly and various Artists	1978	White Mansions	check	check	check
The Who	1978	Who Are You	co-prod	co-eng.	check
Mark Benno	1979	Lost in Austin	check	check	check
Joan Armatrading	1979	Steppin' Out	check	check	check
Live Wire	1979	Pick it UP		check	
Lazy Racer	1980	Formula II	check	check	check
Tim Renwick	1980	Tim Renwick	check	check	check
Paul Kennerly	1980	Legend of Jessie James	check	check	check
Danny Joe Brown	1981	Danny Joe Brown and the Danny Joe Brown Band	check	check	check
Jools Holland	1981	Jools Holland and His Millionaires	check	check	check
Midnight Oil	1981	Place Without a Postcard	check	check	check
Nine Below Zero	1981	Don't Point Your Finger	check	check	check
Chris de Burgh	1981	Best Moves	check	check	check
The Clash	1982	Combat Rock			check
The Who	1982	It's Hard	check	check	check
Local Boys	1983	Moments of Madness	check	check	check
Various artists	1984	ARMS Concert	check	check	check
Jimmy Page, John Paul Jones, Albert Lee	1984	No Introduction Necessary		check	
Téléphone	1984	Un autre monde	check	check	check
Bob Dylan	1984	Real Live	check	check	check
Immaculate Fools	1985	Hearts of Fortune			check
Téléphone	1986	Le Live	check	check	check
Roaring Boys	1986	Roaring Boys	check	check	check
The Big Dish	1986	Swimmer	check	check	check
New Model Army	1986	The Ghost of Cain	check	check	check
Joolz	1987	Hex			check
Spooky Tooth	1987	Spooky Tooth		check	check
Helen Watson	1987	Blue Slipper	check		check
Labi Siffre	1987	(Something Inside) So Strong	check	check	check
John Hiatt	1988	Slow Turning	check		check
Nanci Griffith	1989	Storms	check		check
Green on Red	1989	This Time Around	check		check
John Hiatt	1990	Stolen Moments	check		check
Summerhill	1990	West of Here			check
Del Shannon	1991	The Liberty Years		check	
Energy Orchard	1992	Stop the Machine	check		check
Ethan Johns	1992	Independent Years	check		check
David Crosby	1993	Thousand Roads	check	check	check
Crosby, Stills, & Nash	1994	After the Storm	check	check	check
The Subdudes	1994	Annunciation	check	check	check
Bruce Cockburn	1994	Dart to the Heart			check
Jackopierce	1995	Bringing on the Weather			check
Belly	1995	King	check		check
Joe Satriani	1995	Joe Satriani	check		check
The Beatles	1996	Anthology 3		co-eng.	
Eric Clapton	1996	Crossroads 2: Live in the Seventies	check	check	
The Rolling Stones and various artists	1996	The Rolling Stones Rock and Roll Circus		check	check
Warm Jets	1997	Future Signs	check		check
Bill Wyman's Rhythm Kings	1998	Struttin' Our Stuff			check
Linda Ronstadt	1998	We Ran	check		check
Bill Wyman's Rhythm Kings	1999	Anyway the Wind Blows			check
Emmylou Harris & Linda Ronstadt	1999	Western Wall: The Tucson Sessions	check	check	check
Various artists	1999	Return of the Grievous Angel: A Tribute to Gram Parsons	check	check	check
John Hiatt and various artists	2002	Disney's The Country Bears	musical dir.		
Bruce Cockburn	2005	Speechless			check
Andy Fairweather Low	2006	Sweet Soulful Music	check	check	check
The Clash	2008	Live at Shea Stadium		check	
Ian McLagan & the Bump Band	2008	Never Say Never			+ mastering
Ryan Adams	2011	Ashes & Fire	check	check	check
Ben Waters	2011	Boogie 4 Stu: A Tribute to Ian Stewart			check
The Rolling Stones	2012	Charlie is My Darling: Ireland 1965		check	
The Staves	2012	Dead & Born & Grown Up & Live	co-prod.	check	check
The Rolling Stones	2012	GRRR!			check
Band of Horses	2012	Mirage Rock	check	check	check
Ethan Johns	2012	If Not Now Then When?			check
Aaron Neville	2013	My True Story			check
Patty Griffin	2013	Silver Bell			check
Stephen Stills	2013	Carry On	co-prod.	co-eng.	co-mix
Bob Dylan	2013	Another Self Portrait (1969-1971: The Bootleg Series, Vol. 10)		co-eng.	
Benmont Tench	2014	You Should Be So Lucky	check	check	check
Ian McLagan & the Bump Band	2014	United States			check
Joe Satriani	2014	The Complete Studio Recordings	check		check
Bruce Cockburn	2014	Rumours of Glory (True North)			check
David Bowie	2014	Nothing Has Changed		co-eng.	
Small Faces	2014	Here Come the Nice: The Immediate Years 1967-1969		check	
Small Faces	2014	Greatest Hits: The Immediate Years 1967-1969		check	
Faces	2015	You Can Make Me Dance, Sing or Anything: 1970-1975	check	check	
Various artists	2015	Truckers, Kickers, Cowboys Angels: The Blissed-Out Birth of Country-Rock, Vol. 7: 1974	check	check	check
Various artists	2015	Songs: The Very Best of Acoustic - The Collection	co-prod.		
The Rolling Stones	2015	Get Yer Leeds Lungs Out (Live At University Of Leeds, 1971)		check	
The Rolling Stones	2015	From the Vault: The Marquee Club Live in 1971		check	
Paul McCartney	2016	Pure McCartney		check	
Eric Clapton	2016	I Still Do	check	check	
Eagles	2017	Their Greatest Hits, Vols. 1 & 2	check	check	
Jesse Ed Davis	2017	Red Dirt Boogie: The Atco Recordings 1970-1972		check	

== Discography as a solo artist ==
In the 1960s Johns recorded several singles as a solo artist. The information in this section is taken from Johns' autobiography and from 45Cat. Johns did not produce or engineer any of his solo records.

Artist	Month/Year	Single	Label/Serial No.	Producer
Glyn Johns	June 1962	"Sioux Indian" b/w "January Blues"	Decca F11478	Jack Good
Glyn Johns	Oct. 1963	"Old Deceiver Time" b/w "Dancing With You"	Decca F11753	Tony Meehan
Glyn Johns	1965	"Today You're Gone" b/w "Such Stuff Of Dreams"	Lyntone LYN 827	Tony Meehan
Glyn Johns	Apr. 1965	"I'll Follow the Sun" b/w "I'll Take You Dancing"	Pye 7N 15818	Tony Meehan
Glyn Johns	Nov. 1965	"Mary Anne" b/w "Like Grains Of Yellow Sand"	Immediate IM 013	Tony Meehan
