= Jackie Blue (song) =

Single by The Ozark Mountain Daredevils

from the album It'll Shine When It Shines
- B-side: "Better Days"
- Released: February 1975
- Recorded: 1974
- Genre: Country rock; blue-eyed soul
- Length: 3:16 (single edit); 3:38 (single version); 4:11 (album version)
- Label: A&M
- Songwriter: Steve Cash/Larry Lee
- Producers: Glyn Johns; David Anderle

The Ozark Mountain Daredevils singles chronology
"Look Away" (1974)	"Jackie Blue" (1975)	"If I Only Knew" (1976)

"Jackie Blue" is a track recorded by the Ozark Mountain Daredevils for their second album It'll Shine When It Shines released in 1974. It was written by band members Larry Lee and Steve Cash with lead vocals by Lee. Released as a single in February 1975, "Jackie Blue" became the band's second top 40 hit (following "If You Wanna Get to Heaven").

== Background ==
Ozark Mountain Daredevils drummer Larry Lee wrote "Jackie Blue." Lee was inspired by a male drug dealer and bartender whom he had once known. He later remarked he never saw him during the day. The song first appeared in embryonic form at Nixa Trout Farm, where the Daredevils conceived and rehearsed the songs for their album It'll Shine When It Shines in the final months of 1973. Daredevil Mike Granda would recall Lee previewing the song for the band as "Ooh, ooh, ooh, ooh Jackie Blue/ He was dada, and dada doo/ He did this, he did that/ He went here, he went there/ Blah, blab, blab Ooh ooh Jackie" and despite its obviously rough-form lyrics the song was deemed catchy enough to be performed "as is" at the live shows that the Daredevils played prior to recording the bulk of their next album in the barn at Ruedi Valley Ranch near Bolivar (Missouri) in the summer of 1974.

Even in rough form, Lee's song greatly impressed producer Glyn Johns that he ensured it make the final cut for album inclusion. The Daredevils had completed rough tracks for all of the album's potential cuts when they left Missouri for Los Angeles to mix the favored tracks at Sunset Sound. The exception was "Jackie Blue," which had only been recorded as an instrumental. At Sunset Sound, after Johns overdubbed the studio's grand piano on the one Lee played at the ranch, Lee sang Johns the male-focused lyrics. Johns protested, as Lee would recall: "No, no, no, mate. Jackie Blue has to be a girl." Johns then had Lee and fellow band member Steve Cash step out to "regender" the lyrics (Steve Cash quote): "We started over with some of [Lee's] lyrics, switched them around, and I wrote a couple of verses." (Larry Lee quote:)"We just knocked some new lyrics out in about thirty minutes. [From] some drugged-out guy, we changed Jackie into a reclusive girl."

Hearing the completed track, Cash realized that "Jackie Blue" could afford the band a radio song: "It was completely different than [most] of the music we [had] played up to that point. It had something; it had a [catchy] hook." Band member Jerry Mills would concur: "'Jackie Blue' sounds commercial [because] it has a certain structure that happens to sound good on a car radio." "Jackie Blue" was the first of the band's singles to feature Lee on lead vocal, drawing comparisons to the Beach Boys – who were in fact a seminal influence on Larry Lee – and also Fleetwood Mac, with Bill Mann of The Montreal Gazette, apparently assuming the track was sung by a woman, dismissing "Jackie Blue" as "an outrageous [knockoff] of Fleetwood [Mac]'s sound, down to the female lead."

"Jackie Blue" would rise as high as #3 on the Billboard Hot 100 in May 1975 and would reach #1 on the singles charts in both Cash Box and Record World. According to Steve Cash the single broke out because of heavy airplay in Baltimore and Chicago and then essentially "sold itself" without the benefit of effective promotion from A&M Records, although Mike Granda would opine that A&M (Mike Granda quote): "knew how to market 'Jackie Blue' and did a fabulous job." According to band member Steve Canaday, the Daredevils' album It'll Shine When It Shines underperformed for the parent album of a near #1 hit single (Steve Canaday quote): "['Jackie Blue'] appealed to an audience that was not familiar with our band" and were not necessarily interested in the ... Daredevils beyond that one song, which was "too pop" for fans of the ...Daredevils' self-titled debut album.

"Jackie Blue" would prove to be somewhat of an albatross for the Daredevils, who felt pressured by A&M to cater to the song's fans: (Mike Granda quote): "As soon as 'Jackie Blue' [ran its course] they wanted 'Jackie Green' and 'Jackie Brown'". (Larry Lee quote:) "They wanted a specific sound – they wanted an album full of 'Jackie Blues.'" Although Granda maintains the band "stuck to our guns" both the Daredevils' third and fourth albums: The Car Over the Lake Album (1975) and Men from Earth (1976), drew critical comment that the "Daredevils were patently courting further Top 40 success à la 'Jackie Blue'" – which would however remain their final Top 40 hit.

The album version of the song has a running time of 4:11, while the single was edited to 3:16 with an erroneous time of 3:38. The version that appears on some later CD hit compilations is the actual 3:38 edit. In the edit, the fourth chorus and the third verse at one point and the second part of the fade at the second point were both omitted.

== Chart performance ==
"Jackie Blue" reached #3 on the Billboard Hot 100 while spending two weeks at #1 (May 10–17, 1975) on the Cashbox Singles Chart. It was also a hit internationally: #2 in Canada, #9 in New Zealand, #10 in South Africa, and #27 in Australia.

== Charts ==
=== Weekly charts ===
Chart (1975)	Peak position
Australia (Kent Music Report)	27
Canada Top Singles (RPM)	2
New Zealand (Recorded Music NZ)	9
South Africa	10
US Billboard Hot 100	3
US Cash Box Top 100	1

=== Year-end charts ===
Chart (1975)	Rank
Canada	40
New Zealand	37
US Billboard Hot 100	30
US Cash Box Top 100	27

== Covers ==
- The song was recorded by The Smashing Pumpkins in 1991 as part of the Gish recording and was later released on the compilation 20 Explosive Dynamic Super Smash Hit Explosions! This recording later appeared in the 2012 re-release of Pisces Iscariot.
- Ray Conniff recorded the song for his 1975 album, Another Somebody Did Somebody Wrong Song.
- AM & Shawn Lee recorded a cover of "Jackie Blue" for their 2011 album Celestial Electric.
