= Archive Alive =

Live album by the Ozark Mountain Daredevils
- Released: June 3, 1997
- Recorded: March 9 and 10, 1973
- Label: Archive Recordings
- Producer: Barry Ehrmann and Paul Peterson

The Ozark Mountain Daredevils chronology
Ozark Mountain Daredevils (1980)	Archive Alive (1997)	13 (1997)

Archive Alive is a live album released by American country rock band the Ozark Mountain Daredevils.

It was recorded live at the Cowtown Ballroom in Kansas City, Missouri and the Kiel Opera House in St. Louis, Missouri on consecutive nights in March 1973. A couple of months later they would sign to A&M Records and fly to England to record their debut album. Of the twelve tracks, three debuted on their first album The Ozark Mountain Daredevils. Three songs were not released until their 1976 fourth album Men From Earth. The 1977 album Don't Look Down also contained a song that was held back. These songs are in their earlier stages of development and sound different from the studio versions. "Absolute Zero" and "Reudi Valley Boogie" are instrumental songs.

This concert series had originally been sponsored by and done for Lee Jeans for the short lived radio series Lee Jeans Presents, Live at the Cowtown and engineered by John Stronach and Stephen Barncard via the Record Plant's mobile recording truck. They were discovered almost twenty three years later in the closet of the band's erstwhile manager, Paul Peterson, and leased to Navarre Records, who put them out in 1997 via their Archive Recordings imprint.

== Track listing ==
1. "Absolute Zero"
2. "Beauty In The River"
3. "Homemade Wine"
4. "Chicken Train"
5. "Mountain Range"
6. "Country Girl"
7. "Commercial Success"
8. "Noah"
9. "Sonora"
10. "(I Threw Away)The Chains"
11. "River To The Sun"
12. "Reudi Valley Boogie"

== Personnel ==
- Steve Cash - harp, vocals
- Randle Chowning - lead guitar and vocals
- John Dillon - guitar, mouthbow, fiddle, vocals
- Larry Lee - drums, piano, guitar, vocals
- Steve Canaday - guitar, drums, bass
- Michael "Supe" Granda - bass, vocals
- Larry Lee - drums, guitar and vocals
- Buddy Brayfield - piano and vocals
