= Jackie Blue (disambiguation) =

Jackie Blue is a New Zealand politician.

Jackie Blue may also refer to:

- "Jackie Blue" (song), a 1974 song by the Ozark Mountain Daredevils
- Jackie Blue (album), a 1996 album by the same band
