= Ozark Mountain Daredevils (1980 album) =

Studio album by The Ozark Mountain Daredevils
- Released: May 24, 1980
- Recorded: Record Plant, Los Angeles
- Label: Columbia
- Producer: John Boylan

The Ozark Mountain Daredevils chronology
It's Alive (1978)	Ozark Mountain Daredevils (1980)	Archive Alive (1997)

Ozark Mountain Daredevils is the seventh album (and second self-titled one, after a prior entry from 1973) issued by American country rock band The Ozark Mountain Daredevils. It is their first and only album for the Columbia Records label after having issued six previous albums on A&M Records.

== Critical reception ==
On the eve of release Billboard magazine staff highlighted "dazzling guitar work" of John Dillon and Larry Lee. The musical content of the disc is filled with pop-rock numbers, and the influence of country is minimized.

== Track listing ==
1. "Take You Tonight"
2. "Jump At The Chance"
3. "Sailin' Around The World"
4. "Lovin' You"
5. "Tuff Luck"
6. "Oh, Darlin'"
7. "Empty Cup"
8. "Rosalie"
9. "Runnin' Out"
10. "Fool's Gold"

== Charts ==
Chart (1980)	Position
US Top LPs & Tape (Billboard)	170
Australia (Kent Music Report)	97

== Personnel ==
- Steve Cash - harps, vocals
- John Dillon - guitar, vocals
- Michael "Supe" Granda - bass, vocals
- Larry Lee - keyboard, guitar, percussion, vocals

with:

- John Boylan - acoustic guitar
- Jon Goin - acoustic and electric guitars
- Paulette Brown - backing vocals
- Rosemary Butler - backing vocals
- Tom Kelly - backing vocals
- Venetta Fields - backing vocals
- Mike Botts - drums
- D Clinton Thompson - guitar
- Rune Walle - guitar
- Jai Winding - keyboards
- Buddy Emmons - pedal steel guitar
- Gary Coleman - percussion
- Paul Grupp - percussion
