= High Notes =

Studio album by Hank Williams Jr.
- Released: April 1982
- Genre: Country rock
- Length: 29:12
- Label: Elektra/Curb
- Producer: Jimmy Bowen

Hank Williams Jr. chronology
| The Pressure Is On (1981) | High Notes (1982) | Hank Williams Jr.'s Greatest Hits (1982) |

Professional ratings
Review scores
| Source | Rating |
|---|---|
| Allmusic | 2/5 stars |

High Notes is the thirty-fourth studio album by American musician Hank Williams Jr. It was released by Elektra/Curb Records in April 1982, making it Williams' eighth studio album for Elektra/Curb and his ninth overall for the label. While not as successful or acclaimed as some of Williams' more recent recordings, High Notes was still a commercial success. It peaked at number 3 on the Billboard Top Country Albums chart and was certified Gold by the RIAA, becoming Williams' seventh album to do so. The album also generated two hit singles, "If Heaven Ain't a Lot Like Dixie" and "Honky Tonkin'". "If Heaven Ain't a Lot Like Dixie" peaked at number 5 on the Billboard Hot Country Singles & Tracks chart while "Honky Tonkin'", a song that was originally a number 14 hit written and performed by his father, Hank, Sr., became Hank, Jr.'s sixth Number One hit on the Billboard Hot Country Singles & Tracks chart.

== Track listing ==
| No. | Title | Writer(s) | Length |
|---|---|---|---|
| 1. | "If Heaven Ain't a Lot Like Dixie" | Billy Maddox, David Moore | 2:43 |
| 2. | "Whiskey on Ice" | Bobby Keel, Tony Stampley, Hank Williams Jr. | 2:40 |
| 3. | "High and Pressurized" | Williams Jr., Merle Kilgore | 2:22 |
| 4. | "Can't Change My Tune" | Williams Jr. | 3:12 |
| 5. | "The South's Gonna Rattle Again" | "Wild" Bill Emerson, Jody Emerson, Vince Emerson | 3:26 |
| 6. | "Ain't Makin' No Headlines (Here Without You)" | Jessi Colter, Basil McDavid | 3:02 |
| 7. | "I've Been Down" | Keel, Stampley, Williams Jr. | 3:39 |
| 8. | "If You Wanna Get to Heaven" | Steve Cash, John Dillon | 2:19 |
| 9. | "Norwegian Wood (This Bird Has Flown)" | John Lennon, Paul McCartney | 3:27 |
| 10. | "Honky Tonkin'" | Hank Williams | 2:14 |

== Personnel ==
- Kenny Bell - acoustic guitar
- Harold Bradley - classical guitar
- Roger Clark - drums
- Vernon Derrick - mandolin, fiddle
- Sonny Garrish - steel guitar
- Jim Glaser - backing vocals
- Paul Hatfield - keyboards
- David Hungate - bass
- Kieran Kane - mandolin
- Mike Lawler - organ
- Eddie Long - steel guitar
- Randy McCormick - synthesizer
- Terry McMillan - harmonica
- Terry Mead - trumpet
- Farrell Morris - percussion, congas
- Steve Nathan - keyboards
- Fred Newell - electric guitar
- Hargus "Pig" Robbins - keyboards
- Brent Rowan - electric guitar, acoustic guitar
- Randy Scruggs - banjo, acoustic guitar
- Denis Solee - saxophone, flute
- Jo-El Sonnier - accordion
- Buddy Spicher - fiddle
- Bobby Thompson - banjo
- Harvey Thompson - saxophone
- Wayne Turner - electric guitar
- Billy Joe Walker Jr. - electric guitar
- Tommy Williams - fiddle
- Reggie Young - electric guitar
- Hank Williams Jr. - vocals, banjo, acoustic guitar

== Charts ==
=== Weekly charts ===
| Chart (1982) | Peak position |
|---|---|
| US Billboard 200 | 123 |
| US Top Country Albums (Billboard) | 3 |

=== Year-end charts ===
| Chart (1982) | Position |
|---|---|
| US Top Country Albums (Billboard) | 22 |

== Certifications ==
| Region | Certification | Certified units/sales |
|---|---|---|
| United States (RIAA) | Gold | 500,000^{^} |
^{^} Shipments figures based on certification alone.
