= The Little Red Record =

EP by Ozark Mountain Daredevils
- Released: September 19, 1975
- Recorded: 1975
- Genre: Country rock
- Label: A&M
- Producer: David Anderle

The Little Red Record is an EP by the country rock band the Ozark Mountain Daredevils. The 33⅓ rpm flexi disc record was packaged and included with The Car Over the Lake Album. It contains three outtakes from the prolific It'll Shine When It Shines sessions.

== Track listing ==
1. "Establish Yourself" – 0:18
2. "Time Warp" – 3:13
3. "Journey to the Center of Your Heart" – 2:54
