= Rhythm and Joy =

Live album by The Ozark Mountain Daredevils
- Released: August 8, 2006
- Recorded: December 31, 1980
- Genre: Country rock
- Label: Varese Vintage
- Producer: Paul Peterson

Rhythm And Joy: The 1980 Reunion Concert is an album by the Ozark Mountain Daredevils. Recorded on the last day of 1980 at the Uptown Theater in Kansas City, Missouri. This was the first time in five years the Ozark Mountain Daredevils all played together. These recently discovered tapes and video feature the original lineup.

== Track listing ==
1. "Standing On The Rock"
2. "Black Sky"
3. "Walkin' Down The Road"
4. "One More Night"
5. "Oh Darlin"
6. "Look Away"
7. "Country Girl"
8. "Cobblestone Mountain"
9. "Thin Ice"
10. "Arroyo"
11. "Noah"
12. "Jackie Blue"
13. "Durty Gurl"
14. "Satisfied Mind"
15. "Lovin' You"
16. "Tuff Luck"
17. "If You Want To Get To Heaven"

== DVD ==
1. "Chicken Train"
2. "Look Away"
3. "Country Girl"
4. "Oh Darlin"
5. "Cobblestone Mountain"
6. "Thin Ice"
7. "Noah"
8. "Jackie Blue"
9. "Duty Gurl"
10. "Satisfied Mind"
11. "Lovin' You"
12. "Tuff Luck"
13. "If You Wanna Get To Heaven"

BONUS PERFORMANCE

1. "Commercial Success"

== Personnel ==
The original lineup

- Steve Cash - harp, vocals
- Randle Chowning - guitar, vocals
- John Dillon - guitar, vocals
- Larry Lee - drums, piano, vocals
- Mike "Supe" Granda - bass, vocals
- Buddy Brayfield - keyboards

plus

- Steve Canaday - guitars, drums, vocals
- Terry Wilson - guitar, vocals
- Bill Jones - sax, flute

Background vocals by

- The Darelicks: Beth Spindler, Connie Canaday-Ripley, Jody Troutman (also flute on "Cobblestone Mountain")

== Production ==
- Producer: Paul Peterson
- Collection Produced: Cary E. Mansfield and Paul Peterson
- Digitally Remastered: Dan Hersch, DigiPrep, Hollywood
- Nnotes: Rush Evans
- Art Direction & Design: Bill Pitzonka
- Video Stills: Gary Peterson
