= The Car Over the Lake Album =

Studio album by The Ozark Mountain Daredevils
- Released: October 1975
- Recorded: 1975
- Studios: Quadraphonic Studios, Nashville, TN
- Genre: Southern rock
- Label: A&M
- Producer: David Anderle

The Ozark Mountain Daredevils chronology
It'll Shine When It Shines (1974)	The Car Over the Lake Album (1975)	Men from Earth (1976)

Professional ratings
Review scores
Source	Rating
Allmusic	4/5 stars

The Car Over the Lake Album is the third album by American country rock band The Ozark Mountain Daredevils. Recorded in Nashville, Tennessee, it was named after its cheerfully surreal cover illustration, which was borrowed from a poster advertising one of the band's college gigs. This package originally included a 33⅓ rpm red flexi disc record nicknamed The Little Red Record that was only available in the very first pressings of the album. These tracks were included on later CD releases of the album.

== Track listing ==
No.	Title	Writer(s)	Lead vocals	Length
1.	"Keep On Churnin'"	John Dillon	Dillon	2:53
2.	"If Only I Knew"	Larry Lee, Steve Cash	Lee	3:24
3.	"Leatherwood"	Randle Chowning	Chowning	3:56
4.	"Cobblestone Mountain"	Steve Cash	Cash	2:25
5.	"Mr. Powell"	Lee	Lee	2:50
6.	"Gypsy Forest"	Chowning, Cash	(instrumental)	2:51
7.	"Thin Ice"	Chowning, Cash	Chowning	2:55
8.	"From Time to Time"	Lee	Lee	3:56
9.	"Southern Cross"	Cash, Dillon	Cash	3:27
10.	"Out on the Sea"	Dillon, Elizabeth Anderson Dillon	Dillon	2:39
11.	"Whippoorwill"	Chowning	Chowning	5:09

== Charts ==
Chart (1975)	Peak position
US Top LPs & Tape (Billboard)	57

== Personnel ==
The Ozark Mountain Daredevils

- Randle Chowning - guitars, mandolin, harmonica, vocals
- John Dillon - guitars, mandolin, harmonica, vocals
- Steve Cash - harmonica, vocals
- Buddy Brayfield - piano, electric piano, organ, backing vocals; oboe on "Gypsy Forest"
- Mike Granda - bass, backing vocals
- Larry Lee - drums, guitars, synthesizer, vocals

Additional musicians

- Bill Jones - woodwinds, keyboards, arrangements, backing vocals
- Weldon Myrick - pedal steel guitar
- Farrell Morris - orchestra bells
- Nancy Blake - cello

Production

- Producer: David Anderle
- Recording and re-mixing engineer: Marty Lewis
- Assisted by: Kent Nebergall
- Recorded at Quadrafonic Sound Studios. Nashville, Tennessee
- Re-mixed at Sunset Sound Recorders. Los Angeles
- Mastered by: Doug Sax at the Mastering Lab
- Art Direction: Roland Young
- Album Design: Chuck Beeson
- Front Cover Illustration: Murv Jacob
- Lettering: Stan Evenson
- Back Photos: Jim Mayfield, Billy Higgins. Kansas Film Works
- Photography: Bill Higgins, Jeremy Parkin
- Artist Management: Good Karma Productions
