= If You Wanna Get to Heaven =

1973 song by the Ozark Mountain Daredevils

- 1974 German release

Single by Ozark Mountain Daredevils

from the album The Ozark Mountain Daredevils
- B-side: "Spaceship Orion"
- Released: 1973
- Genre: Southern rock; hard rock
- Length: 3:04
- Label: A&M
- Songwriter: Steve Cash/John Dillon
- Producers: David Anderle, Glyn Johns

Ozark Mountain Daredevils singles chronology
"If You Wanna Get to Heaven" (1973)	"Look Away" (1973)

"If You Wanna Get to Heaven" is a song by the Ozark Mountain Daredevils from their 1973 eponymous debut album. It was the band's debut single and the first of their two top 40 hits, peaking at No. 25 on the Billboard Hot 100 and No. 23 on the Canadian RPM singles chart. The song sold about 500,000 copies.

== Track listing ==
1. "If You Wanna Get to Heaven" 3:04
2. "Spaceship Orion" 3:11

== Cover versions ==
- Hank Williams, Jr. covered the song on his 1982 album High Notes.
- The song was covered by Jeff Carson on his 1997 album Butterfly Kisses.
- In 2007, the song was covered by Saliva lead singer Josey Scott for the film The Dukes of Hazzard: The Beginning. It is heard in the background when The General Lee is being pulled out of the water and being restored.

== Popular culture ==
- The song is played on the in-game radio station Rebel Radio in Grand Theft Auto V. In addition to being featured on the radio station, Jesco White can be found near the northern shore of the game's Alamo Sea dancing to the song.
- The song is used as the opening music to the 1991 PBS documentary Dancing Outlaw, about the life of West Virginian folk dancer Jesco White.
