= Men from Earth =

Studio album by The Ozark Mountain Daredevils
- Released: September 1976
- Genres: Country rock; southern rock
- Label: A&M
- Producer: David Anderle

The Ozark Mountain Daredevils chronology
The Car Over the Lake Album (1975)	Men from Earth (1976)	Don't Look Down (1977)

Men from Earth is the fourth album by American country rock band The Ozark Mountain Daredevils. Founding band member Randle Chowning left to go solo after The Car Over The Lake Album and was replaced by Rune Walle in time for Men From Earth. As their previous album had contained an EP called The Little Red Record, this release featured the even rarer The Little Red Record 2 that contained two additional songs: "Roscoe's Rule" and "A Dollar's Worth Of Regular". These two tracks were included in the 2002 CD release of the album, along with the Chowning composition "Better Days", which had only been released as the B side of their "Jackie Blue" single in late 1974.

== Track listing ==
No.	Title	Writer(s)	Lead vocals	Length
1.	"Fly Away Home"	John Dillon	Dillon	2:50
2.	"You Know Like I Know"	Larry Lee	Lee	4:05
3.	"Breakaway (From those Chains)"	Dillon	Steve Cash	4:00
4.	"The Red Plum"	Cash, Dillon	Cash	2:00
5.	"Mountain Range"	Dillon	Dillon	4:46
6.	"Watermill"	Cash, Dillon	Michael Granda	4:15
7.	"Noah"	Dillon	Dillon	3:06
8.	"It's How You Think"	Lee	Lee	4:24
9.	"Arroyo"	Cash	Cash	5:12
10.	"Homemade Wine"	Lee	Lee	2:37

== Charts ==
Chart (1976)	Peak position
US Top LPs & Tape (Billboard)	74

== Personnel ==
=== The Ozark Mountain Daredevils ===
- John Dillon – guitar, vocals
- Rune Walle – guitar
- Steve Cash – harmonica, percussion, vocals
- Buddy Brayfield – keyboards, backing vocals
- Michael Granda – bass, guitar, vocals
- Larry Lee – drums, guitar, vocals

=== "Sidemen from Earth" ===
- Bill Jones - horns, flutes, synthesizer
- Steve Canaday - drums & "fair witness"
- Jerry Mills - mandolin
- Connie Canaday - vocals
- Randle Chowning - guitar, vocals
- Bobbye Hall - congas, percussion
- "Bean - Definition of Pachuco"

== Production ==
- Quadrofonic Sound Studios. Nashville, Tennessee
- American Artist Studio. Springfield, Missouri
- Caribou Ranch. Nederland, Colo.
- Engineered and mixed by: Marty Lewis
- Mixed: at Caribou Ranch
- Mastered: at Mastering Lab. Los Angeles, California
- Produced by: David Anderle
- Art Direction: Roland Young
- Design: Junie Osaki
- Photography: Jim Mayfield
- Cover Photograph: Clarence & Roscoe Jones, taken June 1976 by Jim Mayfield
