= Now Hear This! =

Studio album by The Ozark Mountain Daredevils
- Released: 1990
- Recorded: 1990
- Genre: Country rock
- Label: Self-Issued
- Producer: Ozark Mountain Daredevils

Now Hear This was a self-produced and distributed album by country rock band the Ozark Mountain Daredevils, recorded in 1990 at Lou Whitney's Column One Studios in Springfield and sold only at concerts on cassette tape.

== Track listing ==
1. "I'm Still Dreamin'"
2. "Everywhere She Goes"
3. "Hilltop Girl"
4. "Over Again"
5. "Love Is Calling"
6. "There Oughta Be a Law"
7. "True Love"
8. "Gonna Buy Me a Car"
9. "(Flame of) Laredo"
10. "The River"

== Personnel ==
- Steve Cash - harps, vocals
- John Dillon - guitar, vocals, mandolini, fiddle
- Mike (Supe) Granda - bass, vocals
- Ron Gremp - drums
- D. Clinton Thompson - lead guitar
