= Alive & Wild =

Live album by The Ozark Mountain Daredevils
- Released: October 2011
- Recorded: November 5 and 6, 2010
- Label: New Era Recordings

The Ozark Mountain Daredevils chronology
Live at the Gillioz (2008)	Alive & Wild (2011)

Alive & Wild is a live album released by American country rock band the Ozark Mountain Daredevils. It was recorded live during the fall of 2010 at the Wildwood Springs Lodge in Steelville, Missouri. The album is a two-disc set, with 21 tracks including old favorites, some rare songs, and a couple of new ones.

== Track listing ==
Disc 1

1. "Standing On The Rock"
2. "Noah"
3. "Southern Cross"
4. "Colorado Song"
5. "Homemade Wine"
6. "Chicken Train"
7. "Yours and Mine"
8. "Fly Away Home"
9. "Ooh Boys (It's Hot)"
10. "E.E. Lawson"

Disc 2

1. "Walkin' Down The Road"
2. "Arroyo"
3. "It Probably Always Will"
4. "The Vine & The Rose"
5. "Black Sky"
6. "Ode to Mel Bay"
7. "You Made It Right"
8. "Gonna Buy Me a Car"
9. "If You Wanna Get To Heaven"
10. "Beauty In The River"
11. "It'll Shine When It Shines"

== Personnel ==
- Steve Cash
- John Dillon
- Michael "Supe" Granda
- Dave Painter
- Kelly Brown
- Ron Gremp
- Bill Jones
- Ruell Chappel
- Nick Sibley
