= It'll Shine When It Shines =

Studio album by The Ozark Mountain Daredevils
- Released: October 1974
- Recorded: June 1974
- Studios: Ruedi Valley Ranch, Bolivar, Missouri
- Genre: Country rock
- Length: 44:03
- Label: A&M
- Producers: Glyn Johns; David Anderle

The Ozark Mountain Daredevils chronology
The Ozark Mountain Daredevils (1973)	It'll Shine When It Shines (1974)	The Car Over the Lake Album (1975)

Professional ratings
Review scores
Source	Rating
AllMusic	4/5 stars

It'll Shine When It Shines is the second album by the American country rock band The Ozark Mountain Daredevils, released in 1974.

Their debut album had been successful enough to give the band the clout to record their follow-up effort on the musicians' home turf. For the session, they cut their tracks in the pre-Civil War farmhouse that served as their rehearsal space, with producers Glyn Johns and David Anderle working from a mobile recording truck parked outside. The homey makeshift setup yielded a loose, organic vibe that invigorated material like Steve Cash's tongue-in-cheek swamp-rocker "E.E. Lawson".

This album contains the band's biggest single, "Jackie Blue", which reached number three on the Billboard Hot 100 in 1975. The song was brought in by Larry Lee late in the session and recorded at the insistence of Johns, who cajoled Lee into altering his original lyrics about a drug-dealing friend into a fond ode to a free-spirited female loner.

== Track listing ==
Side 1
No.	Title	Writer(s)	Lead vocals	Length
1.	"You Made It Right"	John Dillon, Elizabeth Anderson Dillon	Dillon	3:46
2.	"Look Away"	Randle Chowning	Chowning	3:36
3.	"Jackie Blue"	Larry Lee, Steve Cash	Lee	4:11
4.	"Kansas You Fooler"	Lee	Lee	2:39
5.	"It Couldn't Be Better"	Dillon, Anderson Dillon	Dillon	4:23
6.	"E.E. Lawson"	Cash	Cash	3:32

Side 2
No.	Title	Writer(s)	Lead vocals	Length
7.	"Walkin' Down the Road"	Dillon	Dillon	3:28
8.	"What's Happened Along My Life"	Lee	Lee	3:32
9.	"It Probably Always Will"	Michael Granda	Granda	3:15
10.	"Lowlands"	Dillon	Dillon	3:45
11.	"Tidal Wave"	Cash, Dillon	Dillon, Lee & Cash (verses); Chowning (chorus)	4:12
12.	"It'll Shine When It Shines"	Cash, Dillon	Dillon	3:38

== Charts ==
=== Weekly charts ===
Chart (1974–1975)	Peak position
Australia (Kent Music Report)	73
Canada Top Albums/CDs (RPM)	25
US Billboard 200	19

=== Year-end charts ===
Chart (1975)	Position
US Billboard 200	56

== Personnel ==
=== The Ozark Mountain Daredevils ===
- John Dillon - rhythm guitar, dulcimer, harp, keyboards, vocals
- Randle Chowning - lead guitar, dobro, mandolin, harmonica, vocals
- Steve Cash - harmonica, percussion, vocals
- Buddy Brayfield - keyboards, backing vocals
- Michael Granda - bass, guitar, vocals
- Larry Lee - drums, guitar, keyboards, vocals

=== Additional personnel ===
- Glyn Johns - guitar
- Nick DeCaro - accordion
- Jody Troutman - background vocals

== Production ==
- Producer: Glyn Johns/David Anderle
- Recording Engineer: Glyn Johns
- Art Direction: Roland Young
- Photography: Harry Mittman, Jim Mayfield
- Liner notes: Ken Seeholzer
