= The Morells =

American rock band

- Origin: Springfield, Missouri, United States
- Genres: Rock
- Years active: 1982–2002
- Labels: Hightone Records, Almeron Records
- Members: Lou Whitney; D. Clinton Thompson; Dudley Brown; Ron Gremp
- Past members: Joe Terry; Maralie

The Morells are an American rock band from Springfield, Missouri. They released an album titled Shake and Push in 1982. The band's members have included bassist and producer Lou Whitney, guitarist D. Clinton Thompson, keyboardists Maralie (Whitney), Joe Terry, Dudley Brown, and drummer Ron Gremp.

As a producer and hired talent, they have worked with Dave Alvin, Jonathan Richman, Syd Straw, Robbie Fulks, The Bottle Rockets, Wilco, Carolyne Mas, The Del-Lords and Eric Ambel.

== History ==
The band traces its roots to The Symptoms, a bar band in Springfield in 1973. The Symptoms evolved into The Skeletons, which then developed into The Morells (and back and forth since). In various forms they have also performed under the names The Park Central Squares and Combo.com. Several live albums have been released on Almeron Records since 2004.

== Albums ==
- 1982: Shake and Push – Borrowed Records 3302
- 2001: The Morells – Slewfoot Records
- 2005: Think About It – Hightone Records
- 2005: Anthology Live - 101 Songs About Cars, Girls, And Food!!! – Almeron Records
- 2024: You’re Gonna Hurt Yourself – Sound Asleep Records
