= Don't Look Down (Ozark Mountain Daredevils album) =

Studio album by The Ozark Mountain Daredevils
- Released: October 1977
- Label: A&M
- Producer: David Kershenbaum

The Ozark Mountain Daredevils chronology
Men from Earth (1976)	Don't Look Down (1977)	It's Alive (1978)

Don't Look Down is the fifth album by American country rock band The Ozark Mountain Daredevils. The band lost another founding member, Buddy Brayfield, gained a new producer David Kershenbaum, and added three new players, including singer/guitarist and longtime pal Steve Canaday, who as owner of the New Bijou had been instrumental in the group's formation. Despite containing "Following The Way That I Feel", one of the strongest pop tunes in their catalogue, Don't Look Down did not meet sales expectations, and presaged the Ozark Mountain Daredevils' move from A&M Records to Columbia Records.

The album is mentioned in the book Barrel Fever, by David Sedaris, in "Don's Story".

The bonus tracks that appear on the CD rerelease were recorded while Randle Chowning and Buddy Brayfield were still a part of the group.

== Track listing ==
Song lengths and credits taken from CD liner notes.

No.	Title	Writer(s)	Lead vocals	Length
1.	"River To The Sun"	Steve Cash, John Dillon	Cash	3:25
2.	"Crazy Lovin'"	Cash, Dillon	Dillon	3:46
3.	"Giving It All To The Wind"	Larry Lee	Lee	4:14
4.	"The Fox"	Cash	Cash	2:46
5.	"Backroads"	Steve Canaday	Canaday	3:36
6.	"Snowbound"	Cash, Dillon	Cash	3:31
7.	"Following The Way That I Feel"	Lee	Lee	3:37
8.	"Love Makes The Lover"	Dillon, Cash	Ruell Chappell	3:22
9.	"True Believer"	Lee, Cash	Lee	4:15
10.	"Moon On The Rise"	Lee, Cash	Lee	3:05
11.	"Stinghead"	Michael Granda	(instrumental)	2:11
12.	"Sweetwood*"	Dillon, Kevin Wray, Cathy Wray	Dillon	4:30
13.	"Plainity*"	Granda	Granda	2:33
14.	"Valencia Road*"	Cash	Cash	2:53

*Bonus tracks found only on the New Era Productions CD release.

== Charts ==
Chart (1977–1978)	Peak position
Australia (Kent Music Report)	87
US Top LPs & Tape (Billboard)	132

== Personnel ==
=== The Ozark Mountain Daredevils ===
- John Dillon - guitars, fiddle, piano on "Crazy Lovin", vocals
- Steve Cash - harmonica, percussion, vocals
- Michael "Supe" Granda - bass, acoustic guitar and vocals
- Larry Lee - drums, acoustic guitar, synthesizer, vocals
- Steve Canaday - guitar, drums, vocals
- Rune Walle - guitars, sitar, banjo
- Ruell Chappell - keyboards, vocals
- Jerry Mills - mandolin

=== Additional personnel ===
- Randle Chowning - guitars, mandolin, backing vocals (tracks 12, 13, and 14)
- Buddy Brayfield - keyboards, backing vocals (tracks 12, 13, and 14)
- Geoff Richardson - viola (on "Giving It All To The Wind")

== Production ==
- Arranged by Ozark Mountain Daredevils
- Produced by David Kershenbaum
- Recorded at Caribou Ranch Studios in Colorado
- Mixed at AIR Studios in London
- Recording and mix engineer: Pete Henderson; assisted by Tom Likes and Nigel Walker

=== Other Credits ===
- Road Manager: Charlie McCall.
- Equipment: Larry Tucker and Dick Trask.
- Lights and Stage Production: Dan Mayoand Rick Redford.
- Artist Management: Good Karma Productions, Kansas City, Missouri.
- Art Direction: Roland Young.
- Designers: Brian Hagiwara, Stan Evanson.
- Cover Photography: Mark Hanauer.
- Inner-sleeve Photography: Jim McCrary.
