= Buckacre =

American country rock band

- Origin: Spring Valley, Illinois, United States
- Genres: Country rock, rock
- Label: MCA Records
- Past members: Dick Verucchi; Les Lockridge; Alan Thacker; Dick Hally; Darrell Data; David Anson

Buckacre was an American country rock band from the Illinois Valley region of Illinois. The group released two albums for MCA Records: Morning Comes in 1976, produced by Glyn Johns, and the self-titled Buckacre in 1978.

The band received national music-industry attention during the mid-1970s, toured with acts including the Charlie Daniels Band, and performed at venues including the Roxy Theatre in Los Angeles and The Bottom Line in New York City. A 1977 Country Music magazine feature described Buckacre as a five-member group from Spring Valley, Illinois, and reported considerable audience interest during a series of performances in Nashville.

== History ==
=== Formation and musical style ===
Buckacre developed in the Illinois Valley of north-central Illinois. Its best-known original lineup consisted of drummer Dick Verucchi, guitarist and vocalist Les Lockridge, guitarist and violinist Alan Thacker, bassist and vocalist Dick Hally, and guitarist, pedal-steel guitarist and vocalist Darrell Data.

The band's music combined country rock with folk, rock and bluegrass influences. Contemporary coverage frequently compared its close vocal harmonies and country-rock arrangements with the sound associated with the Eagles.

In a March 1977 profile, Country Music magazine described Buckacre's style as country-folk-rock and noted the group's use of close vocal harmony. The publication identified Lockridge as playing acoustic and electric guitar and mandolin and noted the influence of producer Glyn Johns on the group's recorded sound.

=== Signing with MCA and Morning Comes ===
Buckacre signed with MCA Records and recorded its first album, Morning Comes, with British producer and engineer Glyn Johns. Johns had previously worked with artists including the Eagles, The Who and The Rolling Stones.

A September 1976 MCA advertisement introduced Buckacre as a new MCA act and identified Johns as producer of Morning Comes. The advertisement listed Walden-Brusco, Inc. and Rick Alter as the band's management and the Paragon Agency as its booking agency.

Morning Comes was released in 1976 as MCA 2218. Cash Box described the album as part of a developing style that could be characterized as progressive country, rock or pop and noted that the record was produced by Johns.

The album contained ten songs:

1. "Love Never Lasts Forever"
1. "Red Wine"
1. "Dreams of Flying"
1. "Older Lovers"
1. "Don't Let It Slip Away"
1. "Out of Touch"
1. "Bound to Be Blue"
1. "Just Another Night"
1. "Dance Around the Campfire"
1. "Morning Comes"

A November 1976 review in the University Daily of Texas Tech University noted that the members of Buckacre contributed original compositions to the debut album and compared elements of its sound to the Eagles.

The album was also reviewed in the British music press. Music Week categorized Buckacre as a country-rock band and compared the group with the Eagles and Seals and Crofts, while giving the album a mixed review.

=== Touring and national exposure ===
Following the release of Morning Comes, MCA promoted Buckacre nationally. The group made its Los Angeles debut at the Roxy Theatre on September 15, 1976, in a performance for members of the press, radio industry and record dealers.

A photograph published by Record World following the Roxy appearance showed the band with MCA Records president J. K. Maitland, MCA executives, and Buckacre's management team. The caption identified Rick Alter, Alan Walden and Charlie Brusco as Buckacre's co-managers and Eric Kronfeld as the band's attorney.

Buckacre also appeared at New York City's Bottom Line in October 1976 with former Buffalo Springfield and Poco member Richie Furay. Furay's concert archive lists Buckacre as the other act for two sold-out performances on October 13, 1976.

On October 22, 1976, Buckacre appeared with the Charlie Daniels Band and The Outlaws at Elliott Hall of Music at Purdue University. Purdue's Student Concert Committee archive lists all three acts on the bill.

The group attracted significant attention during a later series of performances in Nashville. Country Music reported in March 1977 that approximately 2,000 people passed through Nashville's Pickin' Parlor during a weekend in which Buckacre performed and was broadcast live by WDTA-FM. The magazine reported that the club normally held approximately 250 people and that, during the group's final set, the venue was over capacity while additional people waited outside.

The same article reported that some people within the music industry were predicting significant commercial potential for the group and noted comparisons between Buckacre and the Eagles.

=== Second album ===
Buckacre returned to MCA for a second album, the self-titled Buckacre, released in 1978 as MCA 2365. The album was produced by Win Kutz.

By the second album, the band's personnel had changed. Keyboardist David Anson joined Verucchi, Thacker, Hally and Data for the recording.

In June 1978, Record World reviewed the single "Star That Shines", written by Richard Hally and Les Lockridge and produced by Kutz. The magazine described the song as having bright harmonies and strong guitar work.

The self-titled album was the band's second and final MCA studio album.

== Later recognition ==
In 2015, Buckacre was inducted into the Illinois Valley Community College–La Salle-Peru-Oglesby Junior College Hall of Fame. Illinois Valley Community College describes Buckacre as a "renowned area country rock band" featuring three former IVCC students.

Approximately 400 people attended the November 20, 2015 Hall of Fame induction ceremony honoring Buckacre, philanthropist Ralph Scriba and former IVCC instructor Ray Brolley.

=== 50th anniversary of Morning Comes ===
On September 12, 2026, musicians associated with Buckacre reunited in Spring Valley, Illinois, for a celebration marking the 50th anniversary of Morning Comes.

The concert was held from 7 to 10 p.m. at the Spring Valley Mini Park and featured songs from the 1976 album. WLPO reported that the event was organized as a celebration and fundraiser benefiting Spring Valley's public parks.

== Members ==
=== Morning Comes lineup ===
- Dick Verucchi – drums, percussion
- Les Lockridge – acoustic and electric guitar, mandolin, vocals
- Alan Thacker – acoustic, electric and slide guitar, violin, vocals
- Dick Hally – bass, vocals
- Darrell Data – guitar, pedal steel guitar, vocals

=== Later member ===
- David Anson – piano, keyboards, vocals

== Discography ==
=== Studio albums ===
- Morning Comes — MCA Records, 1976
- Buckacre — MCA Records, 1978

=== Singles ===
- "Star That Shines" — MCA 40919, 1978
