= The Forgotten Trail (1969–74) =

Compilation album by Poco
- Released: October 1990
- Recorded: 1969–1974
- Genre: Country rock
- Label: Epic
- Producer: Jim Messina; Steve Cropper; Jack Richardson; Poco

Professional ratings
Review scores
Source	Rating
Allmusic	4.5/5 stars
Uncut	3/5 stars

The Forgotten Trail (1969–74) is a 2-CD collection of the greatest hits of Poco recorded during the group's work for Epic Records, which included their first eight albums (through Cantamos).

Although this collection does not include most of Poco's biggest hits, which came after the group's move to ABC Records, it does contain both sides of a non-LP single, three remixes, three alternate takes and six unreleased tracks, all of which came from Richie Furay's original time in the band. In particular, the album includes an alternate acoustic version of Poco's first hit, Jim Messina's "You Better Think Twice", and four previously unreleased songs from the Crazy Eyes sessions, including Furay's "Believe Me", which later became a hit for the Souther-Hillman-Furay Band.

== Track listing ==
CD1

1. "Pickin' Up the Pieces" (Richie Furay) – 3:20
2. "Grand Junction" (Rusty Young) – 2:58
3. "Consequently, So Long" (Furay, Skip Goodwin) – 3:50
4. "First Love" [Remix] (Furay) – 3:15
5. "Calico Lady" (Furay, Jim Messina, Goodwin) – 3:03
6. "My Kind Of Love" [First Single A-Side] (Furay) – 2:42
7. "Hard Luck" [First Single B-Side] (Timothy B. Schmit) – 3:50
8. "Last Call (Cold Enchilada #3)" [Previously Unreleased] (Young) – 2:58
9. "Honky Tonk Downstairs" (Dallas Frazier) – 2:43
10. "Hurry Up" (Furay) – 4:06
11. "You Better Think Twice" (Messina) – 3:21
12. "Anyway Bye Bye" (Furay) – 7:01
13. "I Guess You Made It" [Studio Version] (Furay) – 3:11
14. "C'mon" (Furay) – 3:15
15. "Hear That Music" (Schmit) – 3:06
16. "Kind Woman" (Furay) – 5:44
17. "Just For Me And You" (Furay) – 3:37
18. "Bad Weather" (Paul Cotton) – 5:02
19. "You Better Think Twice" [Alternate Take] (Messina) – 3:32
20. "Lullabye In September" [Previously Unreleased] (Messina) – 2:46

CD2

1. "You Are The One" [Live Version] (Furay) – 3:00
2. "From The Inside" [Remix] (Schmit) – 3:12
3. "A Good Feelin' To Know" (Furay) – 4:19
4. "I Can See Everything" [Remix] (Schmit) – 3:32
5. "And Settlin' Down" (Furay) – 3:41
6. "Blue Water" (Cotton) – 3:07
7. "Fools Gold" (Young) – 2:23
8. "Nothin’s Still The Same" [Previously Unreleased] (Furay) – 4:22
9. "Skunk Creek" [Previously Unreleased] (Young) – 2:24
10. "Here We Go Again" (Schmit) – 3:28
11. "Crazy Eyes" (Furay) – 9:39
12. "Get In The Wind" [Previously Unreleased] (Cotton) – 3:48
13. "Believe Me" [Previously Unreleased] (Furray) – 7:41
14. "Rocky Mountain Breakdown" (Young) – 2:28
15. "Faith In The Families" (Cotton) – 3:43
16. "Western Waterloo'" (Cotton) – 4:00
17. "Whatever Happened To Your Smile" (Schmit) – 3:14
18. "Sagebrush Serenade" (Young) – 5:43

== Personnel ==
- Jim Messina - guitar, vocals on tracks 1–16, 19–20 on CD1; bass on track 6 on CD1
- Richie Furay - guitar, 12-string guitar, vocals on all except tracks 14–18 on CD2
- Rusty Young - steel guitar, banjo, dobro, guitar, piano
- George Grantham - drums, vocals
- Randy Meisner - bass, vocals on tracks 1–5 on CD1
- Timothy B. Schmit - bass, vocals on all except tracks 1–6 on CD1
- Paul Cotton - guitar, vocals on tracks 17–18 on CD1 and all CD2

== Production ==
- Jim Messina - tracks 1–16, 19–20 on CD1
- Steve Cropper - tracks 17–18 on CD1, track 2 on CD2
- Poco - tracks 1, 16–18 on CD2
- Jack Richardson - tracks 3–15 on CD2
