= It's Alive (Ozark Mountain Daredevils album) =

Live album by The Ozark Mountain Daredevils
- Released: September 1978
- Label: A&M
- Producer: The Ozark Mountain Daredevils

The Ozark Mountain Daredevils chronology
Don't Look Down (1977)	It's Alive (1978)	Ozark Mountain Daredevils (1980)

It's Alive is the sixth album by The Ozark Mountain Daredevils and is a 2-record set recorded live in concert through Missouri and Kansas with the Enactron truck in April 1978. It contains their hits and well known album cuts. It is their final A&M Records release before moving to Columbia Records.

== Track listing ==
No.	Title	Length
1.	"Walkin' Down The Road"
2.	"Black Sky"
3.	"You Know Like I Know"
4.	"River To The Sun"
5.	"Satisfied Mind"
6.	"Fly Away Home"
7.	"Horsetrader"
8.	"Followin' The Way That I Feel"
9.	"Chicken Train"
10.	"Ooh Boys (It's Hot)"
11.	"Homemade Wine"
12.	"Commercial Success"
13.	"Jackie Blue"
14.	"Noah"
15.	"If You Wanna Get To Heaven"
16.	"It's All Over Now"

== Charts ==
Chart (1978)	Position
US Top LPs & Tape (Billboard)	176
Australia (Kent Music Report)	84

== Personnel ==
- Steve Cash - harmonica, percussion, vocals
- John Dillon - guitar, fiddle, piano, mouthbow, vocals
- Larry Lee - drums, piano, guitar, vocals
- Steve Canaday - guitar, drums, bass
- Michael "Supe de jour" Granda - bass, guitar, vocals
- Buddy Brayfield - keyboards, vocals
- Rune Walle - guitar, banjo
- Jerry Mills - mandolin
- Ruell Chappell - keyboard

== Production ==
- Produced by The Ozark Mountain Daredevils
- Remixed at Sunset Sound Recorders, Hollywood, California
- Engineered by Marty Lewis
- Assisted by Stuart Taylor and Raffaello Mazza
- Concert Sounds by Carlo Sound, Nashville, Tenn.
- Thanks to John Logan and Dennis Fite
- Lights by Cowtown Lights
- Equipment faithfully attended to by Larry Tucker and Steve Fisk
- Road Manager: Charlie McCall
- Art Direction: Roland Young
- Design: Junie Osaki
- Photography: Jim Mayfield
