= The Ozark Mountain Daredevils (album) =

Studio album by The Ozark Mountain Daredevils
- Released: December 1973
- Recorded: June–July 1973
- Studios: Olympic, London
- Genre: Country rock
- Length: 38:30
- Label: A&M
- Producers: Glyn Johns; David Anderle

The Ozark Mountain Daredevils chronology
The Ozark Mountain Daredevils (1973)	It'll Shine When It Shines (1974)

Professional ratings
Review scores
Source	Rating
AllMusic	4/5 stars

The Ozark Mountain Daredevils is the debut album by American country rock band the Ozark Mountain Daredevils. Sporting a patchwork quilt cover that gave some indication of its eclectic musical content, it contained the No. 25 hit single "If You Wanna Get to Heaven", plus many other laid-back originals from the southern Missouri natives.

== Track listing ==
Side 1
No.	Title	Writer(s)	Lead vocals	Length
1.	"Country Girl"	Randle Chowning	Chowning	3:16
2.	"Spaceship Orion"	Larry Lee	Lee	3:11
3.	"If You Wanna Get to Heaven"	Steve Cash, John Dillon	Chowning	3:04
4.	"Chicken Train"	Cash	Cash	3:37
5.	"Colorado Song"	Cash, Dillon	Dillon	5:05

Side 2
No.	Title	Writer(s)	Lead vocals	Length
6.	"Standin' on the Rock"	Dillon	Dillon	3:54
7.	"Road to Glory"	Chowning	Chowning	4:55
8.	"Black Sky"	Cash	Cash	3:08
9.	"Within Without"	Lee	Lee	4:25
10.	"Beauty in the River"	Dillon	Dillon	3:55

== Charts ==
Chart (1973–1975)	Position
Australia (Kent Music Report)	73
Canada Top Albums/CDs (RPM)	23
US Billboard 200	26

== Personnel ==
=== The Ozark Mountain Daredevils ===
- Randle Chowning - lead guitar, acoustic guitar, harmonica, steel guitar, vocals
- John Dillon - rhythm guitar, acoustic guitar, fiddle, Jew's harp, mandolin, autoharp, dulcimer, vocals
- Steve Cash - harmonica, percussion, vocals
- Buddy Brayfield - piano, harpsichord, organ, percussion, backing vocals
- Michael Granda - bass, percussion, backing vocals
- Larry Lee - drums, percussion, acoustic guitar, saw, vocals

=== Additional personnel ===
- Jack Black - backing vocals
- Elizabeth Anderson Dillon - backing vocals
- Sidney Cash - backing vocals
- Janet Lee - backing vocals
- Donald Bromage - backing vocals

== Production ==
- Producer: Glyn Johns/David Anderle
- Recording Engineer: Glyn Johns
- Art Direction: Mike Doud
- Photography: Bill Higgins, Jeremy Parkin
- Liner notes: Mike Dempsey
