= Randle Chowning =

American guitarist

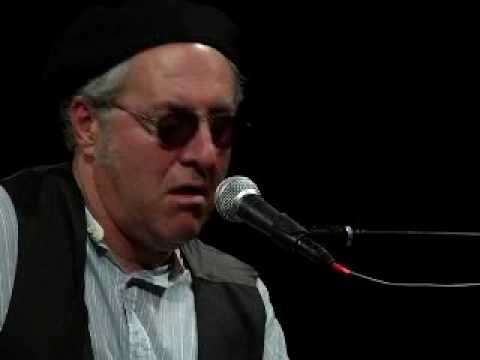
Randle Chowning in 2014

Randle Lynn Chowning (born April 4, 1950, in Mountain View, Missouri) is an American musician best known as the founder, one of the lead vocalists, and the lead guitarist of the Ozark Mountain Daredevils.

== High school and college ==
From a very early age Chowning was surrounded by electric guitars and amplifiers in his father’s TV and radio shop. In 1960 Randle and his family moved to Springfield, Missouri where the Ozark Jubilee country music show was in its heyday. Randle’s musical interest broadened. Taking up guitar around this time he began learning songs in a variety of styles. He played a number of club bands during high school and college.

== Ozark Mountain Daredevils ==
In 1971 Chowning put together several local songwriters with the intent of performing their material as a group. They later would be known as The Ozark Mountain Daredevils. Chowning sang the band’s first chart success “If You Wanna Get To Heaven” which was released on the band's first album, The Ozark Mountain Daredevils, in 1973. The Daredevils continue to perform with two of the original members, Michael "Supe" Granda and John Dillon; however Chowning no longer performs in concert with the band.

== Recent work ==
In the mid 90s, Chowning moved to Nashville, Tennessee and ultimately teamed up with Ozark Mountain Daredevils co-founder Larry Lee in 2005 to release Beyond Reach, a collection of pop originals backed by some of Nashville’s most versatile studio musicians.

After nearly ten years in Nashville, Chowning returned to Springfield, Missouri where he is writing songs that are influenced by rock, country, bluegrass, folk, and blues. He’s still performing with bands, including an acoustic version of Beyond Reach, and also as a solo artist.

Randle just finished a much anticipated CD - R.C. and the Keys/All Over the Place, May 2013. The style of the music is "all over the place" and includes a new version of one of his fan's favorite song "Whippoorwill". This CD was recorded in Nashville, TN and in Springfield, MO.

In March 2015, Randle Chowning and Larry Lee were inducted into the Missouri Writers Hall of Fame, receiving the coveted Quill Award. This was the first time that the award was given to songwriters.

Randle completed a successful Kickstarter Campaign in Dec. 2014. His new Ozark Joe CD is nearing completion at this time. This body of work is a return to his acoustic/folk roots.
