= Glyn Johns =

English recording engineer and producer (born 1942)

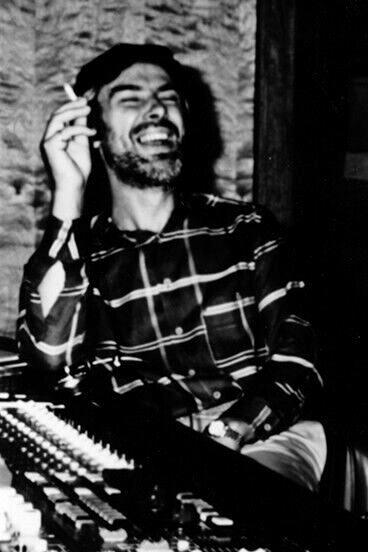
- Johns in 1979

Background information
- Born: Glyn Thomas Johns; 15 February 1942 (age 84); Epsom, Surrey, England
- Genres: Rock; pop
- Occupations: Record producer; engineer; musician
- Instrument: Guitar
- Years active: 1959–present

Glyn Thomas Johns (born 15 February 1942) is an English recording engineer and record producer. He has worked with many of the most famous rock recording acts from both the UK and abroad, such as the Rolling Stones, the Beatles, the Who, Led Zeppelin, the Kinks, Eagles, Bob Dylan, the Band, Eric Clapton, the Clash, Steve Miller Band, Small Faces, the Ozark Mountain Daredevils and Joan Armatrading. Throughout his career, he has generally preferred a live, natural approach to recording in the studio, and developed a method of recording drums sometimes referred to as the "Glyn Johns method".

The years 1964–1984 marked Johns's peak era of activity in which he engineered or produced numerous hit records. In 1965 Johns became one of the first independent British recording engineers to operate freelance rather than under the hire of a particular record label or studio. He was involved in making some of the most influential albums of the rock era such as Beggars Banquet and Let It Bleed by the Rolling Stones, Who's Next by the Who, and Led Zeppelin's debut album. Johns was the chief engineer during the Beatles' Get Back sessions for what became the Let It Be album, as documented in the films Let It Be (1970) and The Beatles: Get Back (2021). Since 1984 Johns has continued to be active in the industry.

Johns is the father of Ethan Johns, and the older brother of Andy Johns (1950–2013), all three of whom shared the same career. In addition to his work as an engineer and producer, Johns has recorded as a solo musical artist. In 2012, Johns was inducted into the Rock and Roll Hall of Fame, receiving the Award for Musical Excellence.

== Early life ==
Glyn Thomas Johns was born in Epsom, Surrey, England, on 15 February 1942, and is the older brother of Andy Johns. He is of partial Welsh ancestry, stating in his autobiography that he "had a Welsh grandfather" and "a Welsh name." His autobiography further recounts that at the age of eight he joined a local church choir as a boy soprano. Felton Rapley, considered one of the leading pipe organists in the UK at the time, became the choirmaster, and as Johns progressed, Johns was given occasional solos and eventually rose to head chorister at the age of eleven. Johns attributes his experience in the choir, particularly hearing and watching Rapley play the organ, as having a profound impact on his musical direction. As he approached adolescence, Johns left the choir after his vocal cords began to change.

Johns recounts that his next-door neighbour lent him a Guild electric guitar, which sparked his interest playing guitar. At this time Johns was attending the church's Wednesday night youth club, where for the first time he saw Jimmy Page play guitar. Johns became a fan of traditional jazz and joined a local ragtag jazz band on tea chest bass. He cites the record "Little Rock Getaway" by Les Paul and Mary Ford as an influence. Les Paul was one of the first musicians to experiment with tape multi-tracking and sound effects. Lonnie Donegan's skiffle hit version of Lead Belly's "Rock Island Line" was also influential—according to Johns, "I had heard nothing like it and rushed out to buy it the next day". He soon bought his own guitar and was introduced to blues and folk recordings by a neighbour, who lent him records by artists such as Snooks Eaglin, Brownie McGhee, Sonny Terry, Woody Guthrie, and Burl Ives. Johns began to keep company with a group of friends interested in music, whose ranks included Ian Stewart (later in the Rolling Stones). In 1959 at the age of 17, Johns left school, and with Mayhew and Golding formed the band the Presidents.

== Career in music and recording ==
Over a long career as an engineer and/or producer, Johns has worked with numerous successful musical acts in the industry. Johns has also recorded as a solo musical artist.

=== Early years: 1959–1963 ===
==== IBC Studios and as performing artist ====
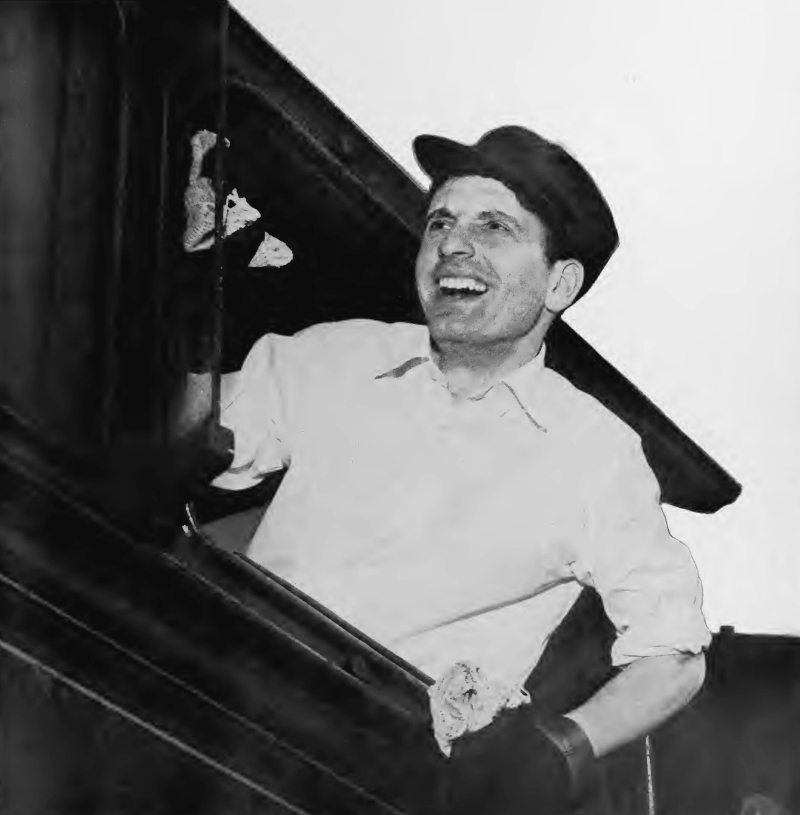
Glyn Johns's first session as a recording engineer was for popular skiffle singer Lonnie Donegan (pictured above) at IBC Studios in London, 1959

In 1959, Johns began his career as an assistant recording engineer at IBC Studios on Portland Place in London. IBC was an independent recording studio and had no affiliation with a label. Johns recounts that his early duties included odd tasks and providing basic support for the experienced engineers. His first session as a recording engineer was for the popular skiffle singer Lonnie Donegan.

At the time IBC had a busy schedule. Coats and ties were required to be worn by recording engineers (and white lab coats for technical engineers). Most recordings were done then in mono (except for classical music). During Johns's first year at IBC, the popularity of rock and roll increased and demand for records that sounded more American. Engineers were confronted with the challenge of capturing louder music. Younger engineers were more apt to try new approaches, and Terry Johnson, another young engineer at IBC, convinced Johns to move in this direction. Johns recounts that Jack Good, one of the UK's early successful television rock and roll producers, made regular use of IBC Studios, and did many of his recordings with Johns and Johnson engineering sessions. They engineered pre-recorded tracks for the Oh Boy! television programme, which featured leading British rock and roll performers of the day, such as Joe Brown, Marty Wilde, Billy Fury, Wee Willie Harris, and others.

Johns recounts that in the early 1960s, he was signed to Decca Records as a solo musical performing artist at the urging of Jack Good. Johns's first single, "Sioux Indian", was produced by Jack Good and the next two produced by Tony Meehan. Johns later went on to record for Pye Records and Immediate Records, but none of his solo records became hits.

During this time, Johns was playing in the Presidents, who, according to Johns, began to put the phrase "Featuring Decca Recording Star Glyn Johns" on their posters. Johns realised that he could invite musicians to IBC on Sundays, when the studio was not booking sessions—letting musicians play in the sound room whilst he honed his engineering and producing skills at the console. The makeshift sessions attracted many of the best young musicians in London, such as Jimmy Page, Ian Stewart, Alexis Korner, Brian Jones, and Nicky Hopkins. Johns recounts that his first session as chief engineer was for a recording by Joe Brown, which was produced by Tony Hatch. (Note: The chief engineer (or balance engineer) is usually an experienced engineer who (often under the producer) supervises studio crew and critical aspects of the recording process. Amongst various tasks during recording sessions, the chief engineer operates equipment in the control room that requires complicated settings, such as the recording console, outboard equipment/signal processing. The chief engineer will usually set the preliminary levels (pre-mix) during the recordings. The chief engineer will often do the later final mix, but sometimes another engineer is chosen for the final mix.) In 1962, Johns entered into an arrangement with George Clouston, the manager at IBC studios, to let him produce records by certain artists.

==== The Rolling Stones 1962–1963 ====
Johns's friend, Ian Stewart was playing piano with the Rolling Stones. The two lived for a while in a house nicknamed "the Bungalow" with one of Stewart's friends, Brian Wiles, who played in a group with Jeff Beck. It was through Stewart that Johns became involved in recording the Rolling Stones on their earliest recordings. Johns mentions that in March 1963, he brought them to IBC to record several tracks. After Andrew Loog Oldham became the Rolling Stones' manager, Stewart was asked to leave the group, and Oldham took over the role as producer of the group's recordings. Oldham moved the Rolling Stones' sessions to other studios, such as Regent Sound, using other engineers, and for more than a year Johns was not involved with the Rolling Stones recordings.

==== As engineer for Shel Talmy ====
In 1963, Johns made arrangements to produce and record a session with Georgie Fame, but was paired, only as engineer, with producer Shel Talmy. Initially he was skeptical, but unexpectedly enjoyed working with Talmy, and the two formed a successful partnership on many recordings for the next couple of years, recording hit songs for acts such as the Kinks and the Who.

=== Peak years: 1964–1984 ===
==== The Kinks, the Who, and Eric Clapton and as independent ====
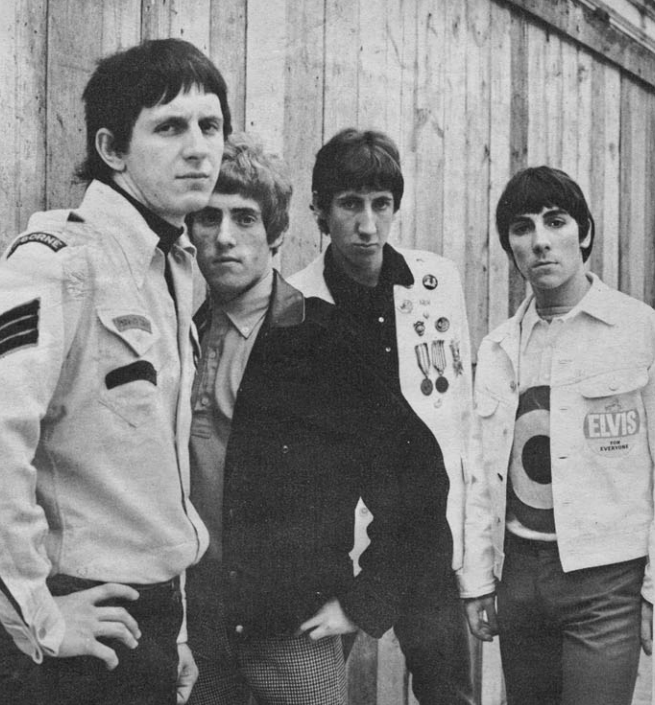
The Who, pictured in 1965. With producer Shel Talmy, Glyn Johns engineered many of the early records by the Kinks and the Who in the mid-1960s. He later went on to produce and engineer with the Who throughout the next decade on albums such as Who's Next (1971), The Who by Numbers (1975), and It's Hard (1983).

During the mid 1960s, Johns worked with several of the popular British beat groups of the era. With producer Shel Talmy he engineered many of the early records by the Kinks and the Who, such as "You Really Got Me" and "All Day and All of the Night" by the Kinks, and "My Generation" by the Who.

In 1965, Johns left IBC studios to further pursue his solo career as a singer and performer and promote his latest record "Mary Anne", but the record failed to chart. At the urging of Talmy, Johns began working freelance as an independent producer and engineer—one of the first independent engineers in the UK. Subsequently, he did sessions at various studios such as Decca, Pye, Marble Arch, and Olympic.

In 1971, Johns reunited with the Who for the first time since the mid-1960s, this time as a co-producer, to work on what became the album Who's Next. (Note: The album began as a soundtrack for the multimedia project, Lifehouse, which though abandoned, ended up forming the basis of Who's Next. The sessions began in New York with Kit Lambert as producer, but were eventually moved to London with Glyn Johns at Olympic Studios. which Johns co-produced, engineered, and mixed.) According to Pete Townshend in his autobiography:

Glyn was my model of what a good producer should be—someone who guides the music and creates the right sound—and there was a great mutual respect and fondness between us. We were both perfectionists in the studio who worked quickly. It was his work as an engineer on the early Who sessions ... that made them sound so great.

Johns continued to work with the Who throughout the 1970s as an engineer on parts of Quadrophenia in 1973. He produced and engineered The Who by Numbers (1975) and produced early sessions for Who Are You (1978) with engineer John Astley, who later took over as producer. Johns returned to work with the group, producing and engineering 1982's It's Hard.

Pete Townshend recruited Johns to engineer Eric Clapton's Rainbow Concert in 1973. Johns produced and engineered Eric Clapton's 1977 album, Slowhand, which featured hits such as "Lay Down Sally", "Wonderful Tonight", and his version of J. J. Cale's "Cocaine", and Clapton's next album, Backless in 1978, which contained another hit "Promises". In his autobiography Eric Clapton wrote about Johns:

He was a disciplinarian who did not like people mucking about or wasting time. When we were in the studio we were expected to work and he'd get frustrated if there was any goofing off. Even though we were all getting stoned or drunk we responded to that quite well. He brought out the best in us, and as a result that album [Slowhand] has great playing and a great atmosphere."

==== The Rolling Stones 1965–1975 ====
Though Johns briefly ceased recording the Rolling Stones in late 1963 and 1964, in 1965 he returned to the role as chief engineer on their British sessions and assisted the group with much of their most famous material. (Note: In the mid-1960s the Rolling Stones divided their recording time between the UK and the US. In 1965 and 1966 they were regularly booked at the RCA studios in Los Angeles with engineer Dave Hassinger. When doing sessions in London, they worked with Glyn Johns as chief engineer. Johns said that his return to working with the Rolling Stones was the result of a coincidence. One night while the group was laying down vocal overdubs at IBC, their producer Andrew Loog Oldham needed an engineer. Their regular engineer was not available, and Johns happened to be on hand. Oldham asked Johns if he wished to do the session and he agreed. Johns and Oldham got along well, and the session ran smoothly. Oldham asked Johns if he wanted to continue engineering with them and Johns accepted.) That year, with producer Andrew Loog Oldham, Johns engineered the group's hit "(I Can't Get No) Satisfaction" and the albums December's Children (And Everybody's) and Out of Our Heads. Johns worked with the Rolling Stones regularly, though not exclusively, as engineer for the remainder of the 1960s and up through the mid-1970s. (Note: In 1966, Johns and Bill Wyman of the Rolling Stones formed Freeway Music, a management and production company.)

Starting with the sessions for Between the Buttons in late 1966, Johns and the Rolling Stones began to record extensively at Olympic Studios. Olympic Studios became Johns's preferred studio for many years, (Note: Johns particularly liked Olympic's Studio 1, whose sound room was converted from an old movie theater and whose acoustics were adaptable to the needs of various types of music, whether a rock band or a sixty-piece orchestra. All of the control rooms at Olympic were equipped with custom recording consoles designed by Dick Swettenham. At Johns' suggestion, Swettenham later went on to form Helios Electronics in 1969 (with record executive/entrepreneur Chris Blackwell). The company made recording consoles that were used on many recordings during the 1970s,) and it became one of the most in-demand recording facilities in England.

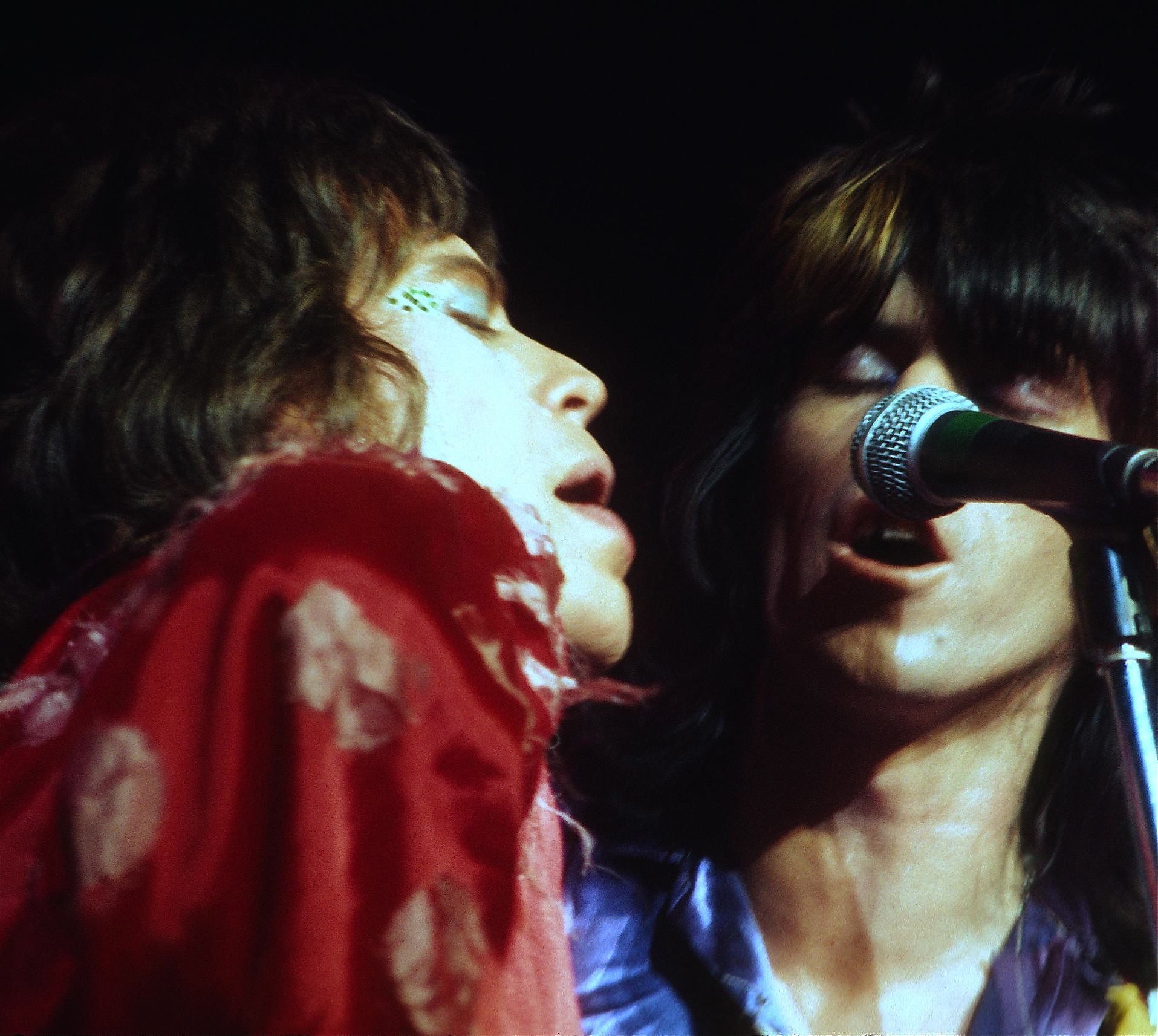
Mick Jagger and Keith Richards of the Rolling Stones pictured in 1972. Glyn Johns engineered many of the group's recordings during the 1960s and 1970s.

In 1968 the Rolling Stones expressed the desire to work with an American producer and Johns recommended Jimmy Miller, who he had seen working with Traffic. Johns stayed on as engineer, and with this team the group recorded Beggars Banquet (1968) and Let It Bleed (1969). Glyn Johns engineered some of the tracks on Sticky Fingers (1971), and Exile on Main St. (1972), both produced by Jimmy Miller. On these two albums his brother, Andy Johns, also worked as an engineer. (Note: While recording Sticky Fingers in 1971, Johns had to leave the sessions to handle commitments in Los Angeles and thus recommended his younger brother Andy Johns to assist the group with the album. The younger Johns had followed his brother's footsteps becoming an engineer, in the late 1960s under the tutelage of Eddie Kramer (while Kramer was recording Jimi Hendrix), and went on to work with artists such as the Rolling Stones, Led Zeppelin, Rod Stewart, Jethro Tull, Television, and Van Halen.) His brother engineered Goat's Head Soup, the last Rolling Stones album produced by Jimmy Miller. Glyn Johns contributed to certain tracks on It's Only Rock 'n Roll, and returned as chief recording engineer during the earlier sessions for Black and Blue, but became frustrated with delays in progress and left following a bitter disagreement with Keith Richards. (Note: Though Mick Taylor had recently left the band, Johns states that he was satisfied with first round of sessions in Munich, but became frustrated during the subsequent Rotterdam sessions, where tapings were constantly delayed whilst the group auditioned dozens of guitarists in search of a replacement for Taylor. Following a bitter argument with Keith Richards, Johns quit the sessions and ended his association with the Rolling Stones.)

==== The Small Faces, the Faces, Humble Pie, and Ronnie Lane and Pete Townshend ====
In the 1960s, Johns engineered many of the records made by the Small Faces, such as "Whatcha Gonna Do About It" "Tin Soldier", their 1967 hit, "Itchycoo Park", which featured the use of bizarre phasing effects Johns learned from another Olympic engineer, George Chkiantz. (Note: Johns describes this effect as "phasing".) Johns engineered the Small Faces' 1968 LP, Ogdens' Nut Gone Flake.

After the group's breakup, guitarist and lead vocalist Steve Marriot formed Humble Pie, whose membership included Peter Frampton—Johns produced and engineered their third and fourth albums, Humble Pie and Rock On. (Note: Glyn Johns's brother, Andy Johns, engineered Humble Pie's first two albums.) The other former Small Faces, Ronnie Lane, Ian McLagan, and Kenney Jones, joined with Rod Stewart and Ronnie Wood, both from Jeff Beck Group to form the Faces, and Johns engineered and co-produced (with the band) the albums A Nod Is as Good as a Wink... to a Blind Horse and Ooh La La. During the 1970s, after leaving the Faces, Ronnie Lane worked on several projects including the Rough Mix album with Pete Townshend, which was produced by Glyn Johns. Lane began to experience health problems and was diagnosed with multiple sclerosis. In 1983, Eric Clapton and Johns helped organize the ARMS Charity Concerts to raise money for Lane's medical bills and research for the disease, and assembled a cast of musicians for the show, which included Clapton, Jimmy Page, Bill Wyman, Charlie Watts, Steve Winwood and others.

==== Led Zeppelin ====
Johns engineered Led Zeppelin's debut album recorded in October 1968. Though Jimmy Page was credited as producer, Johns was involved in the production during the making of the album. According to Johns, when working on the album, he developed his method of using three microphones to record drums for stereo mixes.

==== The Beatles ====
Glyn Johns worked as the chief recording engineer on the Beatles' "Get Back" sessions, which were both taped and filmed. The project resulted in the Let It Be album and the documentary films Let it Be (1970) and The Beatles: Get Back (2021). In 1969, Paul McCartney called Johns and asked him to assist with sessions. George Martin, though officially listed as the producer, only made occasional appearances. During taping and shooting, John Lennon in jest referred to him as "Glynis" (referring to the apparently unrelated actress Glynis Johns).

Johns says it was he who suggested the band play live on the rooftop of their Apple Studio building in Savile Row, London; setting up the recording equipment for their last live performance. He also recommended that the album be structured as an "audio documentary" with talk and banter included between each track. Johns helped the band compile several versions of the album, all of which got shelved before the project was turned over to producer Phil Spector in 1970, who reworked it and released it as the album Let It Be. Johns was critical of Spector's re-produced version, calling it "a syrupy load of bullshit".

Johns engineered early recorded parts of the song "I Want You (She's So Heavy)" at Trident Studios on 23 February 1969, that in later finished form appeared on the Abbey Road album. For Abbey Road's remaining tracks, the group returned to EMI Studios and re-united with producer George Martin and a team of engineers including Geoff Emerick, Phil McDonald, and Alan Parsons.

Johns assisted with early sessions of Paul McCartney and Wings' Red Rose Speedway. (Note: Some sources mention Johns as the producer, but in his autobiography Johns does not take credit for that role, nor does the list at the end of the book credit him as producer.) Johns quit the project due to what he described as his lack of satisfaction with the material.

==== Procol Harum, Joe Cocker, the Move, and the Easybeats and others ====
Johns also worked with other British acts such as Procol Harum, Joe Cocker, the Move, and Fairport Convention. He engineered several songs by Australia's the Easybeats, including their 1967 hit "Friday on My Mind", which was produced by Shel Talmy. Johns worked with the French musician Johnny Hallyday.

==== The Steve Miller Band, Bob Dylan, the Band, the Eagles ====
In the late 1960s and 1970s, Johns was in demand on both sides of the Atlantic and worked with American acts such as the Steve Miller Band, and the Eagles. Johns did his first work with an American act in 1968 with the Steve Miller Band, whom he had seen perform live at the Fillmore in San Francisco. The group came to England to record their debut album, Children of the Future, at Olympic with Johns as engineer. During the sessions, Johns assumed the role of producer. Johns produced and engineered their next three albums, Sailor, Brave New World, and Your Saving Grace.

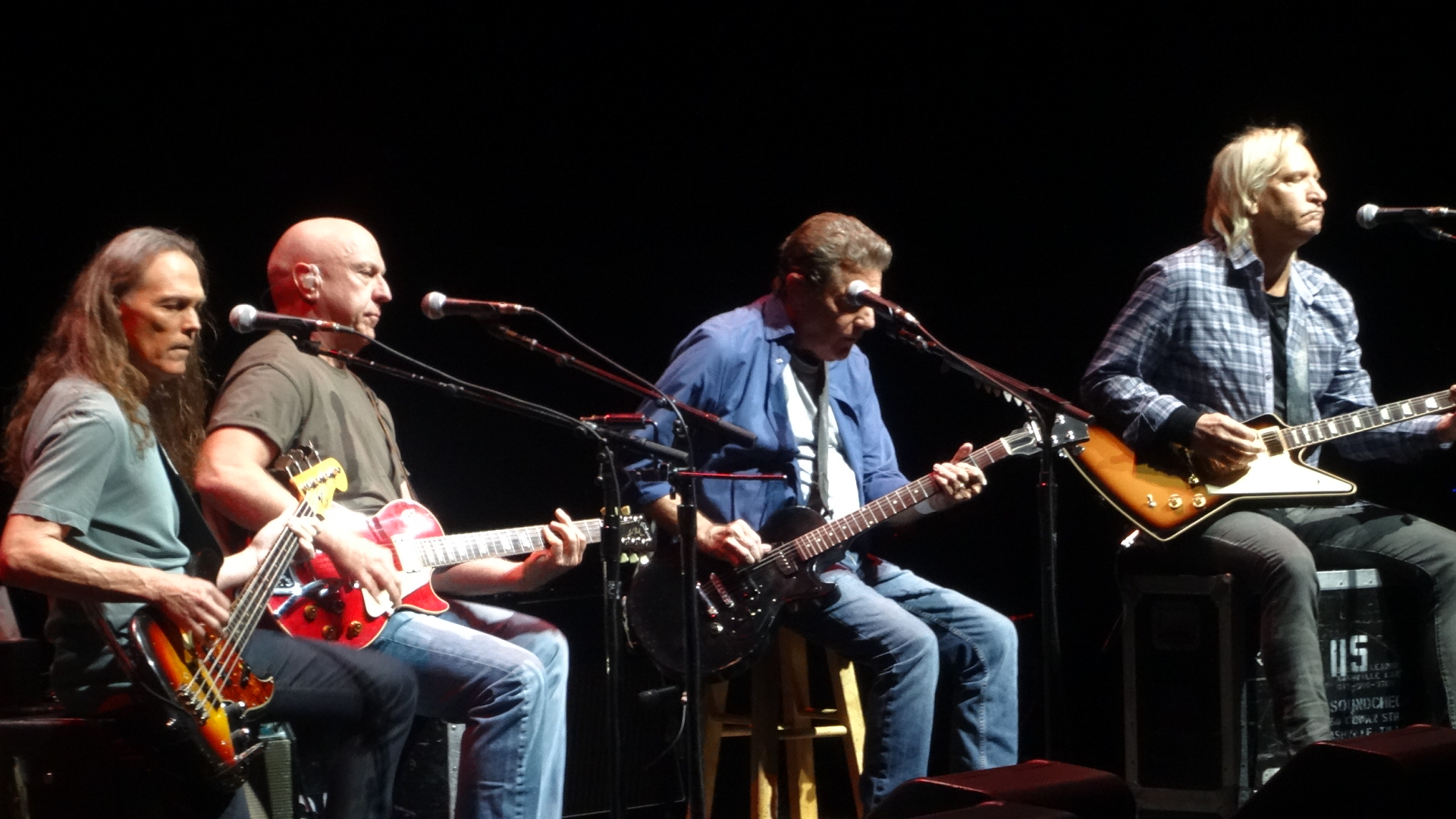
Glyn Johns produced and engineered the Eagles' first three albums in the early- to mid-1970s.

At the request of producer Bob Johnston, Johns engineered the live recordings of Bob Dylan's performance backed by the Band at the Isle of Wight Festival in 1969, some of which appeared on his 1970 Self Portrait album. He later produced and engineered Dylan's 1984 live album, Real Live. Johns also did one of the mixes for the Band's Stage Fright in 1970. (Note: Todd Rundgren did another mix for the album. It has been debated which mix appeared on the first Capitol pressing of the album.)

Johns engineered and produced the Eagles' first three albums, bringing them to Olympic Studios in London to record their self-titled debut, followed by Desperado, and the early sessions for On the Border. During these years they achieved success, recording hits such as "Witchy Woman", "Tequila Sunrise", and "Best of My Love", which became their first number one hit single. Increasingly the group began to develop internal friction and with Johns. They also objected to Johns' ban on use of drugs in the studio. By 1974, singer/guitarist Glenn Frey and drummer/vocalist Don Henley gained control of the band, and sought a more hard-rocking approach. Johns, who preferred their early country-rock orientation, fell out of favour with the group and left during the making of On the Border, so they moved the sessions to California and brought in producer/engineer Bill Szymczyk to finish the album. Eventually, Randy Meisner and Bernie Leadon departed, and the band recruited Don Felder, Timothy B Schmit, and former James Gang guitarist Joe Walsh.

==== Other American acts ====
Johns engineered and co-produced the first two albums by the Ozark Mountain Daredevils, which provided the hits "If You Wanna Get to Heaven" and "Jackie Blue". Johns worked with others such as Spooky Tooth, Billy Preston, and Howlin' Wolf. Johns engineered the song "A Man Needs a Maid" on Neil Young's 1971 Harvest album. Johns has also worked with Emmylou Harris.

==== Joan Armatrading ====
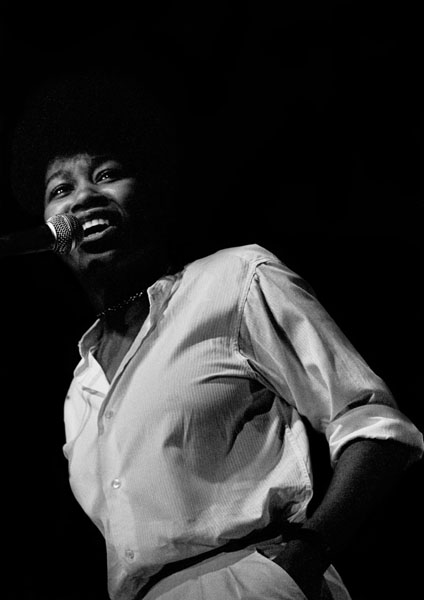
Glyn Johns produced three albums by Joan Armatrading in the 1970s.

After assessing the disappointing sales of Joan Armatrading's second album, A&M Records selected Johns to produce her next three albums, beginning in 1976 with Joan Armatrading, followed by Show Some Emotion (1977), and To the Limit (1978). Providing Armatrading with her first chart hit, "Love and Affection", the eponymous third album cemented her career, and was once described by Johns as his best work.

==== The Clash ====
In 1982, Johns worked with the Clash during the late stages of making the album Combat Rock. Initially it was intended to be a double album tentatively under the working title Rat Patrol from Fort Bragg. The group's chief songwriters Mick Jones and Joe Strummer disagreed on how to proceed, and according to Johns even booked separate studios in New York to do their own competing mixes of the album. (Note: It is well known that Mick Jones did a mix prior to the arrival of Glyn Johns, but in Glyn Johns's autobiography, he mentions that both Strummer and Jones did mixes.) According to Clash biographer Marcus Gray, the group's manager Bernie Rhodes, pushed to bring in either Gus Dudgeon, who had produced Elton John, or Glyn Johns. (Note: The situation that Gray recounts is somewhat confusing. Gray indicates that Rhodes may have meant Glyn Johns when he proposed Dungeon.) Johns recounts that the chief of London's CBS Records A & R department, Muff Winwood (brother of musician Steve Winwood), having been dissatisfied with Jones' and Strummer's mixes, asked Johns to remix the album. Johns agreed and, upon hearing an acetate of one of the previous mixes, was concerned about the record's apparent self-indulgence, but was also impressed with many of its tracks and realised that there was enough strong material to make a good album. Johns recommended that the album be shortened to one disc, and proceeded to reduce the number of tracks for inclusion, plus he edited down the length of several tracks in addition to remixing all of the songs that ended up on the final release. (Note: In similar fashion, Johns helped the Who pare down Pete Townshend's sprawling Lifehouse concept into the more concise Who's Next (1971).)

=== 1985–present ===
Though Johns's output slowed in the mid-1980s, he undertook work with Midnight Oil, Nanci Griffith, Belly, New Model Army, Joe Satriani, John Hiatt, Buckacre, Gallagher and Lyle, Georgie Fame, Helen Watson, and many others. Johns produced much of Linda Ronstadt's 1998 We Ran album.

In 2011, after a number of years spent largely away from production, Johns worked with Ryan Adams on his album, Ashes & Fire. In February 2012, Johns began work on the Band of Horses album, Mirage Rock. Johns and Clapton collaborated once again for Clapton's 2016 release I Still Do.

== Approach to recording ==
Johns has stated that he prefers, when possible, to record instrumental tracks with musicians playing together live in the studio as a collective unit, using a limited number of microphones and tracks—in a space suitable for ensemble playing that has unique acoustical characteristics, and he generally prefers recording the basic track from one continuous take of a whole performance, rather than editing together different pieces.

"I have never lost the value of musicians interacting with one another as they play. This can be so subtle and invariably is nothing more than a subconscious emotive reaction to what others are playing around you, with what you are contributing having the same effect on them. When a musician overdubs his or her part onto an existing track, this ceases to be a two-way interaction.

Johns developed an approach for recording drums in stereo, sometimes referred to as the "Glyn Johns Method", that aims to achieve a natural perspective of the whole kit, rarely employing more than three or four microphones. His method consists of using two overhead microphones, with one placed over the snare drum and the other slightly over and to the right of the floor tom (both pointed towards and equidistant from the snare drum), as well as a third microphone set in front of the bass drum. He sometimes uses an additional close mic for the snare drum.

== Family ==
Glyn Johns is the older brother of the producer and engineer Andy Johns (1950–2013), who began as an engineer with Jimi Hendrix under the tutelage of Eddie Kramer, and like Glyn Johns, worked with the Rolling Stones and Led Zeppelin. Glyn Johns has two older sisters.

With Glyn Johns's first wife Sylvia, Johns had two children, including a son Ethan Johns, (a producer and engineer who has worked with artists such as Paul McCartney, Kings of Leon, and, like his father, Ryan Adams,) as well as a daughter Abigail Johns.

Glyn Johns is the uncle of the blues musician Will Johns (son of Andy Johns).

== Legacy ==
Glyn Johns is recognized as one of the pre-eminent audio engineers and record producers of the rock era. On 14 April 2012, he was inducted into the Rock and Roll Hall of Fame in Cleveland, Ohio. He received an Award for Musical Excellence and was honoured for his work on landmark recordings by many famous artists. He was also the winner of the 2013 Music Producers Guild Inspiration Award.

Johns has written an autobiography titled Sound Man, published by Blue Rider Press on 13 November 2014, in which he recounts his experiences working with the Rolling Stones, the Beatles, the Who, the Eagles, Crosby, Stills and Nash, and others.
