= The Ozark Mountain Daredevils =

American rock band

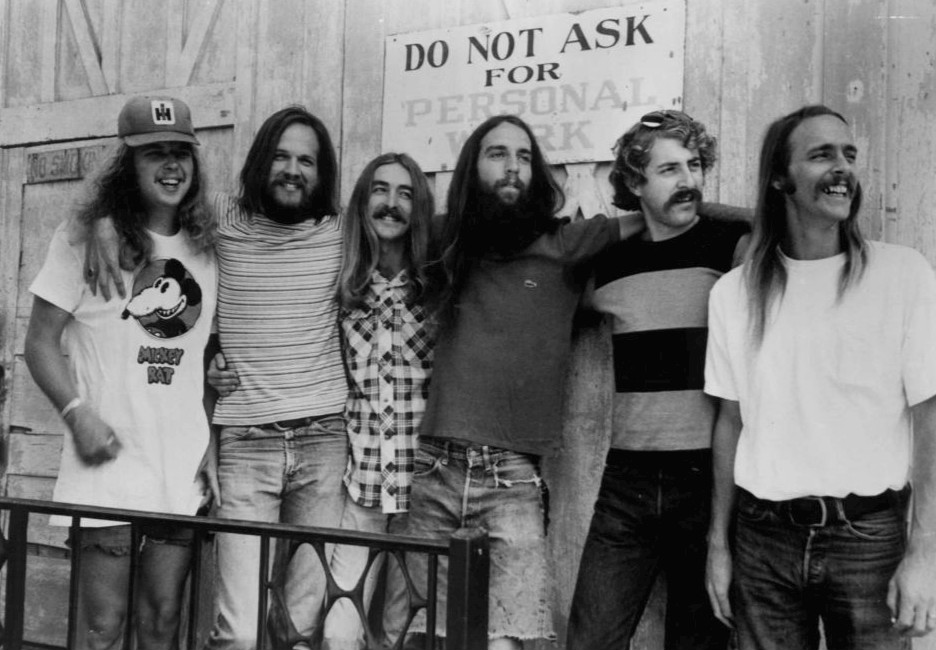
- The band in 1975. From left: Buddy Brayfield, John Dillon, Larry Lee, Mike "Supe" Granda, Randle Chowning, Steve Cash.

Background information
- Also known as: The Family Tree (1971–72)
- Origin: Springfield, Missouri, U.S.
- Genres: Country rock; southern rock; country pop
- Years active: 1971–present
- Label: A&M
- Members: John Dillon; Mike "Supe" Granda; Bill Jones; Ruell Chappell; Ron Gremp; Dave Painter; Kelly Brown; Nick Sibley; Molly Healey
- Past members: Buddy Brayfield; Steve Cash; Randle Chowning; Larry Lee; Steve Canaday; Rune Walle; Jerry Mills; Larry Van Fleet; Terry Wilson; Bobby Lloyd Hicks; Joe Terry; Gary Smith; Jason Le Masters; Don Clinton Thompson; Rick 'Lumpy' Davidson; Bill Brown; Tom Whitlock; Darrell Osburn
- Website: ozarkdaredevils.com

The Ozark Mountain Daredevils are an American rock band formed in 1971 as The Family Tree in Springfield, Missouri. They are most widely known for their singles "If You Wanna Get to Heaven" in 1974 and "Jackie Blue" in 1975. Bassist Michael "Supe" Granda has written a book about the band, It Shined.

== Name ==
According to the book It Shined by Michael Granda, the band name was derived from "Cosmic Corn Cob & His Amazing Ozark Mountain Daredevils", a name that John Dillon came up with at a Kansas City "naming party" after the band was told that the name they had previously been using, "Family Tree", was already taken ("Burlap Socks" and "Buffalo Chips" were two other monikers that had been considered). The band shortened the name because none of the band members at the time wanted to be called "Cosmic Corn Cob", and they did not want the name to sound similar to the Amazing Rhythm Aces.

== History ==
=== 1971–1972: Early history ===
In 1971, guitarist Randle Chowning formed The Family Tree with Steve Cash (harmonica), John Dillon (guitar), Elizabeth Anderson (percussion & guitar), Larry Lee (drums & guitar), Rick Campanelli (piano), Bill Jones (horns) and Michael Granda (bass & guitar). The band recorded a demo at Springfield, Missouri's Top Talent Studios (soon to be renamed as American Artists) and that demo, containing such early songs as "Rhythm of Joy", found its way to New York music executive John Hammond via band friend Steve Canaday.

In July 1972 Hammond sent a producer, Michael Sunday, to the band's Ruedi-Valley Ranch in Aldrich, Missouri, the house rented from Randle Chowning's Southwest Missouri State University teacher Mrs. Ruedi, where the band rehearsed and where Chowning and his brother Rusty lived. Sunday offered the group $500 to make another demo tape at American Artists but ultimately decided to pass on offering them a contract. Many of the songs on this demo appeared thirteen years later as the record The Lost Cabin Sessions.

The band later sent a tape to the team who managed fellow Missourians Brewer & Shipley, Kansas City's Paul Peterson and Stan Plesser. The pair became the band's managers in October 1972. The band then changed their name to the Ozark Mountain Daredevils (see "Name") and saw the departure of Campanelli and Jones along with the addition of Buddy Brayfield, a friend of Granda's, as the piano player. Anderson, though still romantically involved with Dillon, left as well. Jones continued to appear as a guest with the band live and in the studio until 1977. He returned to the stage as a permanent member in 2010.

The band started touring in 1972. On March 9 and 10, 1973, they played at Kiel Opera House in St. Louis and Cowtown Ballroom in Kansas City, with Brewer & Shipley, and accompanied by Loudon Wainwright III. Performances from these shows later appeared on a CD called Archive Alive in 1997.

=== 1973–1976: Success ===
The group's demo tape caught the attention of A&M Records staff producer David Anderle in 1973, who was looking for an Eagles-esque country rock band for the label's roster. Anderle and producer Glyn Johns flew to Missouri to catch the band's aforementioned performance at Cowtown Ballroom on March 10, 1973. But the band, nervous about Johns and Anderle being in the audience, did not play their best. Afterwards, the two men were invited to hear the band give an unplugged performance by candlelight. This time, Anderle and Johns were impressed, and they were signed to A&M on May 1, 1973. The group set out to London to record their first album at Olympic Studios with Johns at the helm in June and July.

The first record, The Ozark Mountain Daredevils, was released in December 1973 and spawned the Top 30 hit "If You Wanna Get to Heaven" in the summer of 1974. The album introduced the band's eclectic mixture of rock, country, hillbilly music, bluegrass, and pop.

For the second album, It'll Shine When It Shines (October 1974), Johns and Anderle came to Missouri to record, utilizing a mobile recording truck parked outside of the band's rehearsal home. During the sessions, Johns overheard Larry Lee, sitting at a piano, playing and singing a song about a friend of his who sold drugs. Johns believed it could be a hit if the lyrics were altered to downplay the drug references. Lee and Cash did as Johns asked and the song, "Jackie Blue", became the Daredevils' signature song and a huge hit (No. 3) in the spring of 1975.

The Ozark's third release, The Car Over the Lake Album (September 1975), recorded in Nashville, Tennessee, was produced by Anderle and sold fairly well but produced no hits. Steve Canaday returned to the fold in 1975 as road manager and opening act.

In 1976 Dillon, Brayfield, Lee and Chowning also appeared on Hoyt Axton's A&M LP Fearless, contributing back-up vocals on the album's opening song, "Idol of The Band."

A&M began to lose its enthusiasm for the act, as the members proved stubbornly faithful to their regional identity. The band refused to relocate to southern California, as suggested by Jerry Moss and as was typical of the time. In the spring of 1976, the band embarked on a tour of Europe. By the time the exhausted musicians reached Copenhagen, Denmark for their final show at Daddy's Dance Hall, they were faced with difficult acoustic phenomena at the venue. An angry Randle Chowning responded by turning up his amplifier all the way, which upset the other band members and resulted in a shouting match at the end of the night. Upon their return home, Chowning refused to speak to the others or take their calls. Norwegian musician Rune Walle, whom the band had met while on tour in Europe (with his band the Flying Norwegians), was contacted in June to replace him. Walle's first show with the group was at Arrowhead Stadium in Kansas City on July 23, 1976, on a bill that also included the Beach Boys, the Doobie Brothers, Jeff Beck and Firefall. Chowning went on to form his own Randle Chowning Band.

That same year, the group headed to Caribou Ranch to record their fourth album, which they had originally titled Nuclear Fishing but changed to Men From Earth after A&M objected. The Nuclear Fishing title was later used in Canada for a greatest hits album release. Evergreen, Colorado resident Jerry Mills joined the band on mandolin, also serving as publicist, and Canaday officially joined on drums, guitar, and vocals.

Buddy Brayfield departed following the album's release to study medicine, and Ruell Chappell from the Springfield group Spillwater Junction was hired on keyboards. However, the band's next releases – Don't Look Down (October 1977, and It's Alive (September 1978) – sold in exponentially smaller quantities than their previous records. Jerry Mills was dismissed after It's Alive.

During the summer of 1978, the Daredevils went out for a short run of shows opening for Fleetwood Mac. Granda was not available since he was at home with his wife after the birth of their second child, and bassist Larry Van Fleet (from the Randle Chowning Band) sat in with the group. On August 26, 1978 the Ozarks appeared at Canada Jam on a bill that also included Kansas, Atlanta Rhythm Section, the Doobie Brothers, the Commodores and others. The same year, John Dillon and Steve Cash contributed to an album, White Mansions, which documented life in the Confederacy during the American Civil War. Waylon Jennings, Eric Clapton, Jessi Colter, Bernie Leadon and several other musicians appeared on this record as well. In September, the group flew to Hollywood to appear on The Midnight Special. When Jerry Moss witnessed the inebriated band members race through their set on the show, A&M were notified not to renew the band's contract, and the Ozarks found themselves without a label in 1979.

=== 1980–1986: Lineup changes ===
The group signed with Columbia Records and put out the self-titled Ozark Mountain Daredevils in May 1980. This album, recorded in Los Angeles, was produced by John Boylan and did not feature Chappell or Canaday, and Walle only contributed slide guitar to a few songs. Boylan insisted on bringing in session players for a more commercial "California country rock" sound, despite its decline by 1980, and the album featured a slicker soft rock sound.

In 1980, Walle left the Daredevils to be replaced by Springfield guitarist Terry Wilson (who had been playing with Granda in a side project called the Dog People). Chappell also departed in 1980 to relocate to Florida.

In December 1980 Brayfield, Chowning, Jones and Chappell (Chappell at the first show only) reunited with the band for two shows. The first was at Hammons Student Center on December 6 and the second, on December 31, occurred at the Uptown Theater in Kansas City. The latter show was later put out on CD (in August 2006) and DVD (in June 2007) as 1980 Reunion Concert: Rhythm And Joy.

Larry Lee left the band and relocated to Nashville, Tennessee, to pursue his own career in 1982 after releasing a solo album, Marooned, that had been recorded in Los Angeles for Columbia and released in March of the same year. He also worked as a songwriter and country producer (for Alabama, Juice Newton and others) and played drums on occasion with other acts, including in a stint with Jimmy Buffett's Coral Reefer Band. After Lee's 1982 departure, the group was left a quintet; Dillon, Cash, Granda, Canaday and Wilson.

Later that same year, Dillon and Cash departed as well. It was decided that the group would continue with Granda, alongside a returning Randle Chowning, leading a new lineup that included Bobby "Lloyd" Hicks (vocals, drums, percussion), Joe Terry (vocals, keyboards) and Tulsa guitarist Gary Smith. Canaday stayed on and once again became the band's road manager.

This new grouping only lasted about a year and a half before Chowning left again, Hicks took a job with Kerry Cole & the Lefty Brothers and Joe Terry joined a new band, the Morells. At this point, the band began managing themselves and Dillon and Cash agreed to rejoin. Gary Smith stayed around a few months more before relocating to Branson, Missouri. By mid-1983, the band included Dillon, Cash, Granda, Canaday and Gary Smith, the latter succeeded by Jason LeMasters (guitar), before LeMasters departed to join Kris Kristofferson and was replaced in 1984 by Chowning, back for his third stint with the Daredevils.

In September 1984, Dillon, Cash, Granda, Chowning and Canaday visited Column One Studios in Springfield to record new tracks with Larry Lee returning as recording engineer. The resulting demos failed to attract a new record deal.

=== 1987–1990 ===
The following year, the band followed Lee to Nashville to record a new album produced by Wendy Waldman that, like their 1980 Columbia release, utilized session players. Lee briefly rejoined for this album but there was no interest at all from any of the labels in Nashville in the project. A small French company, Dixiefrog Records, eventually picked up the record and it was released in France as Heart of the Country in 1987. Many of the same songs were released in England in 1989 as Modern History on the Conifer label.

In the meantime, the Daredevils continued on with The Morells guitarist Don Clinton Thompson joining in the spring of 1986 after Chowning departed again. During the spring of 1988, the group toured in France and other European countries in support of Heart of the Country, which had recently been released there. In 1989, drummer/manager Canaday decided to leave for Nashville to become tour manager for Lee Roy Parnell, Tammy Wynette and Marshall Chapman. He was briefly succeeded on drums by the band's sound man, Rick "Lumpy" Davidson, who had guested with the band onstage playing washboard. Thompson and Davidson departed at the end of 1989.

In 1990, guitarist Bill Brown (from Granda's side project Supe & the Sandwiches) and The Morells drummer Ron "Rongo" Gremp joined, and the band returned to the studio for the 1990 release Now Hear This!. It was recorded at Lou Whitney's studios in Springfield, and was released on cassette only.

=== 1991–2008 ===
In 1991 Rick "Lumpy" Davidson returned to sub for Ron Gremp on drums. The group continued to tour throughout the 1990s. Kelly O'Shea from the Titanic Blues Band sometimes filled in for Brown on lead guitar from 1992 to 1994.

In 1996, the group was approached by former manager Stan Plesser to re-record some of their best-known songs for the company Eclipse Records. This was recorded in Nashville with producer Bob Wright with only Dillon, Cash and Granda appearing, augmented by session musicians. Larry Lee and Steve Canaday also appeared, singing backing vocals. The CD was titled Jackie Blue and appeared in March 1997 as a budget product sold mostly at convenience stores. The album has been re-released many time under different titles, including Our Most Dangerous Stunts in June 2006.

New Era Productions, a company formed by a band friend, funded an album of new material in 1996, 13. The album was recorded in their hometown of Springfield and mixed mostly in Nashville by Lee, who played and sang on it as well. Randle Chowning also contributed to the album, but after the band was unable to secure a major label release, he requested to be erased. 13 was released in June 1997.

On September 25, 1999, Steve Canaday was killed, aged 55, when the small plane he was traveling in crashed in Nashville, Tennessee while he was working as an aerial photographer.

On July 23, 2004 guitarist Bill Brown died of smoke inhalation in a Springfield house fire that also took the life of another local guitarist, Don Shipps. Shipps had played with Granda's side project, Supe & the Sandwiches. On October 16, the group and several other Springfield bands appeared at the Abou Ben Adhem Shrine Mosque at a memorial show for Brown, which also acted as a fundraiser for his family. The 2004 lineup consisted of Dillon, Cash, Granda, Gremp, and Dave Painter, who joined that year. Beginning with a series of shows in May 2007 at Gillioz Theater in Springfield, Kelly Brown joined as the group's new keyboardist. These shows were recorded for a 2008 DVD release called Revival (Live at the Gillioz).

Starting in 2005, Lee and Chowning reunited in the group Beyond Reach, which formed in Nashville but moved to Springfield. In 2006 and 2007, Lee and Chowning appeared as special guests at some Ozark Mountain Daredevils shows, as captured on Revival.

=== 2008–2019 ===
A live album, titled Alive & Wild, was made available in October 2011. The recordings were pulled from shows performed at Wildwood Springs Lodge in Steelville, Missouri, in November 2010. The lineup at this time consisted of Dillon, Cash, Granda, Gremp, Painter, Brown, a returning Bill Jones, Ruell Chappell (who rejoined in 2008 on percussion/vocals), and Nick Sibley (guitar, mandolin, harmonica, backing vocals).

From 2010 to 2019, the band continued to make concert appearances with this nine-piece lineup, occasionally joined (from 2012) on stage by violinist Molly Healey, who became a permanent member in 2014.

As of the 2010s, Buddy Brayfield, by then Dr. Sam Brayfield, was a physician in Osage Beach, Missouri, playing on occasion with local band Buddy and the Notes. For the first time since 1980, Brayfield rejoined the group for a reunion concert at Gillioz Theater in September 2010. Brayfield indicated that he decided to play the concert since his children had never seen him play with the group.

Bobby "Lloyd" Hicks, the group's 1982 drummer, died on February 19, 2017 after suffering extensive lung damage stemming from double pneumonia, just three weeks shy of his 70th birthday.

In early 2018, the band announced on their Facebook page the release of a new album, Off The Beaten Path, as a self-release.

=== Cash's death, subsequent activity ===
On May 17, 2019 the band self-released Heaven 20/20, a 7 track EP featuring five new songs, one live song, and a re-recording of "If You Want To Get To Heaven." It would be the last album to feature co-founder Steve Cash before his death on October 13, 2019 after an extended illness, aged 73.

In 2020, The Ozark Mountain Daredevils and Major Brands, the largest Missouri based distributor of alcoholic and non-alcohol beverages, announced production of "Ozark Dry Gin" to be sold to retailers and restaurateurs in Missouri. The band's late 1980s drummer and washboard player Rick "Lumpy" Davidson, aged 72, died on February 21, 2020 after a bout with cancer.

Throughout the 2020s, the band remained active on Facebook account, posting updates, pictures, and videos. One post from December 2021 announced a project celebrating the bands 50th anniversary in 2022, the publication of The Ozark Mountain Daredevils on Record: A Narrative Discography.

Band bassist Michael "Supe" Granda appeared on the December 24, 2021 episode of Wheel of Fortune and won $9,500.

To further celebrate their 50th anniversary, the band announced a return to Springfield to perform three gigs at The Landers Theatre (March 17–19, 2022), where they had played their first gig in 1972 under the name "Family Tree". On May 17, 2022, the group made their Grand Ole Opry debut as part of their 50th anniversary "Time Warp Tour". And on June 30 their documentary, Ozark Mountain Daredevils Backstage, debuted on PBS Television.

Tom Whitlock, who occasionally filled in on drums for the group in the early 1980s, died at age 68 in Gallatin, Tennessee on February 18, 2023 after a battle with Alzheimer's disease. In June 2023 the band released the digital single "More Cowbell" on all streaming platforms.

=== 2024–present: Farewell ===
In March 2024 the group announced they would be playing a farewell tour that summer, joined by Pure Prairie League. The tour stretched into 2025 and concluded at the end of the year. Larry Lee died on May 10, 2025, at the age of 78.

As of 2026, the Ozark Mountain Daredevils continue to play intermittent concerts in Missouri as well as in surrounding areas.

== Members ==
=== Current ===
- Michael "Supe" Granda – bass, mandolin, guitar, backing & lead vocals (1971–present)
- John Dillon – guitar, mandolin, fiddle, dulcimer, autoharp, keyboards, mouth bow, lead & backing vocals (1971–1982, 1983–present)
- Bill Jones – saxophone, percussion (1971–1972, 2010–present; touring/session 1974–1976)
- Ruell Chappell – percussion (2008–present), keyboards (1976–1980), lead & backing vocals (1976–1980, 2008–present)
- Ron "Rongo" Gremp – drums (1990–present)
- Dave Painter – lead guitar, backing & lead vocals (2004–present, occasional fill-in 1998–2004)
- Kelly Brown – keyboards, backing vocals (2007–present)
- Nick Sibley – rhythm guitar, harmonica, mandolin, backing & lead vocals (2010–present)
- Molly Healey – fiddle, lead vocals (2014–present, frequent guest 2012–2014)
- Jeremy Montgomery – mandolin, guitar (2024–present)

=== Former ===
- Randle Chowning – lead guitar, harmonica, lead & backing vocals (1971–1976, 1982–1983, 1984–1986)
- Larry Lee – drums, percussion, keyboards, guitar, lead & backing vocals (1971–1982, 1984, 1986) (died 2025)
- Steve Cash – harmonica, percussion, lead & backing vocals (1971–1982, 1983–2019, his death)
- Rick Campanelli – keyboards (1971–1972)
- Elizabeth Anderson Dillon – percussion, guitar (1971–1972; died 2019)
- Buddy Brayfield – keyboards, oboe, backing vocals (1972–1976)
- Steve Canaday – guitar, drums, lead & backing vocals (1976–1982, 1983–1989) (died 1999)
- Jerry Mills – mandolin (1976–1978)
- Rune Walle – lead guitar, banjo, sitar, backing vocals (1976–1980)
- Terry Wilson – lead guitar, backing vocals (1980–1982)
- Gary Smith – rhythm guitar, vocals (1982–1983, occasional fill-in 1979–1982)
- Joe Terry – keyboards, backing vocals (1982–1983)
- Bobby 'Lloyd' Hicks – drums (1982–1983) (died 2017)
- Jason LeMasters – lead guitar (1983)
- D. Clinton Thompson – lead guitar, backing vocals (1986–1989)
- Rick "Lumpy" Davidson – drums (1989, fill-in 1991) (died 2020)
- Bill Brown – lead guitar, backing vocals (1990–2004, his death)

=== Substitute musicians ===
- Tom Whitlock – drums (occasional fill-in in the early 80s) (died 2023)
- Kelly O'Shea – guitar (occasional fill-in 1992–1994)

== Discography ==
=== Official US studio albums ===
Year	Album	US	AUS
1973	The Ozark Mountain Daredevils	26	72
1974	It'll Shine When It Shines	19	73
1975	The Car Over the Lake Album	57	—
1976	Men from Earth	74	—
1977	Don't Look Down	132	87
1980	Ozark Mountain Daredevils	170	97
1997	13	—	—
2018	Off The Beaten Path	—	—

=== Official US live albums ===
Year	Album	US	AUS
1978	It's Alive	176	84
1997	Archive Alive	—	—
1999	Concert Classics	—	—
2006	Rhythm And Joy	—	—
2008	Revival (Live at the Gillioz)	—	—
2011	Alive & Wild	—	—

=== Official US compilation albums ===
Year	Album
1981	The Best
2000	Time Warp – The Very Best Of

=== European compilation albums ===
Year	Album
1987	Heart of the Country
1989	Modern History
1990	Now Hear This!
2006	Our Most Dangerous Stunts

=== Live DVDs ===
Year	DVD
2007	Rhythm And Joy
2008	Revival (Live at the Gillioz)

=== Singles ===
Year	Single	Chart Positions				Album
Year	Single	US	US$	AUS	CAN	Album
1974	"If You Wanna Get to Heaven"	25	21	—	23	The Ozark Mountain Daredevils
1974	"Chicken Train Stomp"	—	—	—	—	The Ozark Mountain Daredevils
1974	"Country Girl"	—	—	—	—	The Ozark Mountain Daredevils
1974	"Look Away"	101	88	—	—	It'll Shine When It Shines
1975	"Jackie Blue"	3	1	27	2	It'll Shine When It Shines
1975	"You Made It Right"	—	—	—	—	It'll Shine When It Shines
1976	"If I Only Knew"	65	71	—	74	The Car Over the Lake Album
1976	"Thin Ice"	—	—	—	—	The Car Over the Lake Album
1976	"Keep On Churnin"	—	—	—	—	The Car Over the Lake Album
1977	"You Know Like I Know"	74	55	—	62	Men From Earth
1977	"Noah"	—	—	—	—	Men From Earth
1977	"Crazy Lovin'"	—	—	—	—	Don't Look Down
1980	"Take You Tonight"	67	83	—	—	Ozark Mountain Daredevils
1980	"Oh, Darlin'"	—	—	—	—	Ozark Mountain Daredevils
