= Steve Cash =

American musician (1946–2019)

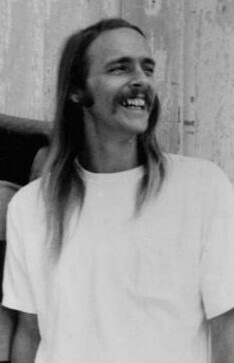
- Cash in 1975

Background information
- Born: Stephen Douglas Cash; May 5, 1946; Springfield, Missouri, U.S.
- Died: October 13, 2019 (aged 73) Springfield, Missouri, U.S.
- Genres: Southern rock; country rock
- Formerly of: The Ozark Mountain Daredevils

Stephen Douglas Cash (May 5, 1946 – October 13, 2019) was an American musician, most notable as a founding and continual member of the rock band The Ozark Mountain Daredevils.

== Biography ==
Born in Springfield, Missouri, Cash received his undergraduate education at the University of Missouri, where he was a member of the Zeta Phi chapter of Beta Theta Pi. He was a founding member of the Ozark Mountain Daredevils and, with the exception of a brief period away from the band in the early-1980s, remained an active member for over forty years.

In later years, Cash became a published author with his Meq trilogy (The Meq, Time Dancers and The Remembering).

Cash died on October 13, 2019.
