= List of Small Faces members =

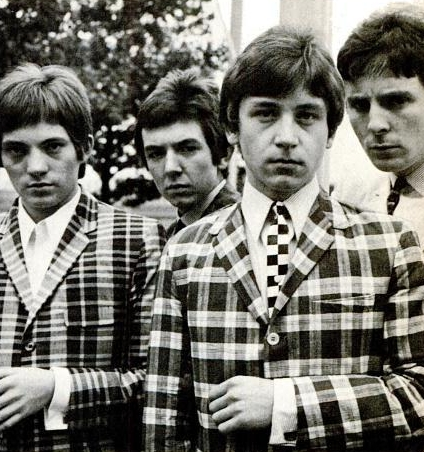
Small Faces in 1965 (left to right) Marriott, Lane, Jones and Winston

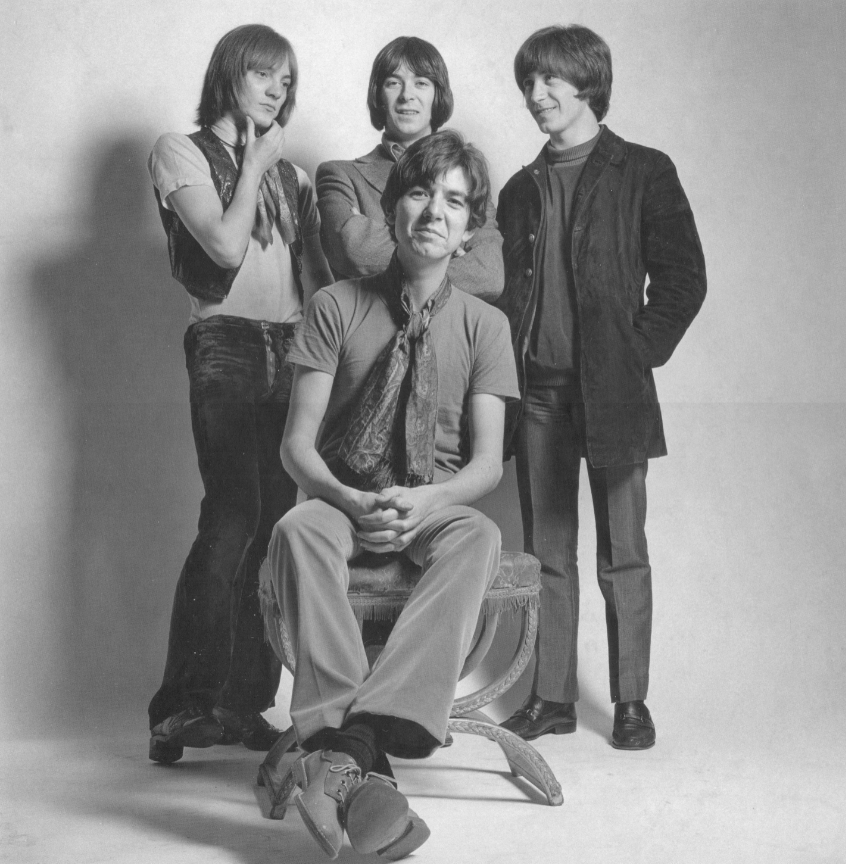
In 1968 (left to right) Marriott, McLagan, Jones
(seated) Lane

Small Faces were originally a British rhythm and blues band with a heavy mod following. They were later heavily praised and regarded as an influential psychedelic group with songs such as "Here Come the Nice","Itchycoo Park" and "Lazy Sunday" Formed in early 1965, the group originally included guitarist and lead singer Steve Marriott, bassist Ronnie Lane, keyboardist and guitarist Jimmy Winston and drummer Kenney Jones.

== History ==
Small Faces were formed in early 1965 by Steve Marriott, previously of the Moments, Ronnie Lane and Kenney Jones of the Outcasts and Marriott's acquaintance Jimmy Winston. Don Arden signed them onto Decca Records, and released their debut single "Whatcha Gonna Do About It" shortly thereafter. It managed to reach number 14 on the UK Singles Chart. The follow-up single "I've Got Mine" was not nearly as successful, as it failed to chart in the UK.

Winston left the band for a solo career shortly after. In a 2000 interview, Kenney Jones 'stated' the reason Winston was fired from the band was because "He (Winston) got above his station and tried to compete with Steve Marriott." Reality is he left. Ian McLagan, of the Muleskinners, replaced Winston as the keyboardist. McLagan played his debut performance with them on 2 November 1965. After "Sha-La-La-La-Lee" became their first top ten hit, the Small Faces enjoyed widespread success, particularly in the UK and mainland Europe. Despite rumours that the group split on New Year's Eve of 1968, the truth is that they were actually obligated to perform a few scheduled live performances during the earlier parts of 1969 before finally separating, with Marriott forming Humble Pie, and the remaining Small Faces created Faces with Rod Stewart and Ronnie Wood, both formerly of The Jeff Beck Group.

== Members ==
Image	Name	Years active	Instruments	Release contributions
	Steve Marriott	1965–1969; 1975–1978 (died 1991)	lead and backing vocals; lead and rhythm guitar; keyboards; harmonica	all Small Faces releases
	Kenney Jones	1965–1969; 1975–1978	drums; percussion	all Small Faces releases
	Ronnie Lane	1965–1969; 1975 (died 1997)	bass; rhythm guitar; backing and lead vocals	all Small Faces releases from "Whatcha Gonna Do About It" (1965) to The Autumn Stone (1969)
	Jimmy Winston	1965 (died 2020)	rhythm and lead guitars; keyboards; backing and lead vocals	"Whatcha Gonna Do About It" (1965); "I've Got Mine" (1965); Small Faces (1966); From the Beginning (1967); The Autumn Stone (1969)
	Ian McLagan	1965–1969; 1975–1978 (died 2014)	keyboards; rhythm guitar; bass; backing and lead vocals	all Small Faces releases from "Sha-La-La-La-Lee" (1966) to 78 in the Shade (1978)
	Rick Wills	1976–1978	bass; backing vocals	Playmates (1977); 78 in the Shade (1978)
	Jimmy McCulloch	1977–1978 (died 1979)	lead and rhythm guitars; backing vocals	78 in the Shade (1978) – as guest

== Session contributors ==
Image	Name	Years active	Instruments	Release contributions
	Kenny Lynch	1965–1966 (died 2019)	backing vocals	Small Faces (1966)
	P. P. Arnold	1966–1968; 1977	backing vocals	There Are But Four Small Faces (1968); Ogdens' Nut Gone Flake (1968); Playmates (1977)
	Billy Nicholls	1967–1968	backing vocals	Ogdens' Nut Gone Flake (1968)
	David McCallum Sr.	1967–1968 (died 1972)	conductor	Ogdens' Nut Gone Flake (1968)
	Stanley Unwin	1967–1968 (died 2002)	narration	Ogdens' Nut Gone Flake (1968)
	Lyn Dobson	1967–1968	flute	Ogdens' Nut Gone Flake (1968); In Memoriam (1969)
	Eddie Thornton	1967–1968	trumpet	Ogdens' Nut Gone Flake (1968); In Memoriam (1969)
	Harry Beckett	1967–1968 (died 2010)	trumpet	Ogdens' Nut Gone Flake (1968); In Memoriam (1969)
	Derek Wadsworth	1967–1968 (died 2008)	trombone	Ogdens' Nut Gone Flake (1968); In Memoriam (1969)
	Joe Brown	1977	mandolin; acoustic guitar; backing vocals	Playmates (1977)
	Mel Collins	1977	saxophone	Playmates (1977)
	Dave Hynes	1977	backing vocals	Playmates (1977)
	Greg Ridley	1977 (died 2003)	backing vocals	Playmates (1977)
	Vicki Brown	1977–1978 (died 1991)	backing vocals	Playmates (1977); 78 in the Shade (1978)
	Helen Chappelle	1978	backing vocals	78 in the Shade (1978)
	Lavinia Rogers	1978	backing vocals	78 in the Shade (1978)
	Madeline Bell	1978	backing vocals	78 in the Shade (1978)
	Liza Strike	1978	backing vocals	78 in the Shade (1978)
	Sam Brown	1978	backing vocals	78 in the Shade (1978)
	Stephen Smith	1978	backing vocals	78 in the Shade (1978)
	Greg Cobb	1978	backing vocals	78 in the Shade (1978)
	Nick Webb	1978	backing vocals	78 in the Shade (1978)

== Line-ups ==
Lineup	Members	Contributions
January – October 1965	Steve Marriott – guitars, vocals; Kenney Jones – drums, percussion; Jimmy Winston – guitars, keyboards, vocals; Ronnie Lane – bass, vocals	"Whatcha Gonna Do About It" (1965); "I've Got Mine" (1965); The BBC Sessions (1999) (tracks 1-3)
November 1965 – February 1969	Steve Marriott – guitars, keyboards, vocals; Kenney Jones – drums, percussion; Ian McLagan – keyboards, bass, guitars, vocals; Ronnie Lane – bass, guitars, vocals	Small Faces (Decca) (1966); From the Beginning (1967); Small Faces (Immediate) (1967); There Are But Four Small Faces (1967); Ogdens' Nut Gone Flake (1968); In Memoriam (1969); The Autumn Stone (1969); The BBC Sessions (1999) (remaining tracks); Live 1966 (2021)
Band inactive February 1969 – late 1975
Late 1975	Steve Marriott – guitars, keyboards, vocals; Kenney Jones – drums, percussion; Ian McLagan – keyboards, bass, guitars, vocals; Ronnie Lane – bass, guitars, vocals	none
Early 1976 – September 1977	Steve Marriott – guitars, keyboards, harmonica, vocals; Kenney Jones – drums, percussion; Ian McLagan – keyboards, guitars, vocals; Rick Wills – bass, vocals	Playmates (1977)
September 1977 – 1978	Steve Marriott – guitars, keyboards, vocals; Kenney Jones – drums, percussion; Ian McLagan – keyboards, guitars, vocals; Rick Wills – bass, vocals; Jimmy McCulloch – guitars, vocals	78 in the Shade (1978); The Complete Atlantic Years (2021) "Kayoed (By Luv)" and "Hungry And Looking" only
