= The Autumn Stone =

Compilation album by Small Faces
- Released: 14 November 1969
- Length: 65:59
- Label: Immediate

Small Faces chronology
In Memoriam (1969)	The Autumn Stone (1969)	Playmates (1977)

Professional ratings
Review scores
Source	Rating
Allmusic	4.5/5 stars
Rolling Stone	(favorable)
Uncut	3/5 stars

The Autumn Stone is a compilation album of songs by the English rock band Small Faces, released in the UK in 1969 on the Immediate label.

== Album profile ==
The double album contains most of the Small Faces' Immediate and Decca original 7" single releases, together with live recordings from a concert at Newcastle City Hall and previously unreleased material, some of which was possibly intended for the band's projected but unrealised fourth LP, 1862.

Alongside the title track, the album contained an alternative version of "Afterglow Of Your Love" (which had been released as the Small Faces' final single earlier in the year), covers of two Tim Hardin songs ("If I Were A Carpenter" and "Red Balloon") and the instrumentals "Wide Eyed Girl On The Wall" and "Collibosher" (both of which are claimed to be unfinished backing tracks by the compilers of the Here Comes The Nice: The Immediate Years box set). "Collibosher" was recorded during the sessions for the band's 1968 "Ogden's Nutgone Flake" album. "Call It Something Nice" is the earliest previously unreleased track included, having been recorded in October 1967.

The title track "The Autumn Stone" and "Wham Bam Thank You Ma'am" (its correct title, according to composer Steve Marriott – 'Wham Bam Thank You Man', as it was titled on the Afterglow single where the song first found release in March 1969, was apparently a label misprint) had both originally been recorded on 11 September 1968 as the A and B sides of a projected (but ultimately unreleased) single. This recording session proved to be the band's final studio work together aside from some session work in Paris with Peter Frampton for a Johnny Hallyday album in December.

== Release ==
The Autumn Stone album was released by Immediate Records founder Andrew Loog Oldham in November 1969, more than six months after the band had officially announced their break up, and three months after Steve Marriott's new band Humble Pie had released their own debut LP. In Germany, a single LP version with only the 'new' material was released under the title In Memoriam. On some later repressings of the LP the live version of All Or Nothing is replaced with the 1966 studio version, and the 1969 single version of "Afterglow" is replaced with an edit of the 1968 album version from Ogden's Nut Gone Flake.

A 3LP/3CD 'definitive expanded deluxe edition' of the album, remastered from original sources and including extra material, was released on March 28, 2025.

== Track listing ==
All tracks written by Steve Marriott and Ronnie Lane unless otherwise noted. All lead vocals by Marriott, except where noted.

Side One
No.	Title	Original release	Length
1.	"Here Come The Nice" (Written and sung by Steve Marriott with Ronnie Lane)	There Are But Four Small Faces	2:57
2.	"The Autumn Stone" (Written and sung by Marriott)	In Memoriam	4:00
3.	"Collibosher" (Instrumental)	In Memoriam	3:12
4.	"All Or Nothing"	From the Beginning	3:03
5.	"Red Balloon" (Timothy Hardin)	In Memoriam	4:12
6.	"Lazy Sunday"	Ogden's Nut Gone Flake	3:06
Total length:			20:30

Side Two
No.	Title	Original release	Length
7.	"Call It Something Nice" (vocals: Marriott and Lane)	In Memoriam	2:05
8.	"I Can't Make It"	1967 single	3:06
9.	"Afterglow (Of Your Love) (Single mix)"	Ogden's Nut Gone Flake	3:24
10.	"Sha-La-La-La-Lee" (Kenny Lynch, Mort Shuman)	Small Faces (1966)	2:56
11.	"The Universal"	1968 single	2:42
Total length:			14:13

Side Three
No.	Title	Original release	Length
12.	"Rollin' Over (Live)"	In Memoriam	2:31
13.	"If I Were A Carpenter (Live)" (Hardin)	In Memoriam	2:32
14.	"Every Little Bit Hurts (Live)" (Edward Cobb)	In Memoriam	6:20
15.	"My Mind's Eye"	From the Beginning	2:04
16.	"Tin Soldier"	1967 single There Are But Four Small Faces	3:21
17.	"Just Passing" (vocals: Lane)	B-side of "I Can't Make It"	1:13
Total length:			18:01

Side Four
No.	Title	Original release	Length
18.	"Itchycoo Park"	1967 single There Are But Four Small Faces	2:50
19.	"Hey Girl"	1966 single From the Beginning	2:18
20.	"Wide Eyed Girl On The Wall" (Instrumental)	In Memoriam	2:47
21.	"Whatcha Gonna Do About It" (Brian Potter, Ian Samwell)	Small Faces (1966)	1:57
22.	"Wham Bam, Thank You Mam"	B-side of "Afterglow (Of Your Love)"	3:18
Total length:			13:10

== Personnel ==
Steve Marriott - vocals, guitar, harmonica
Ronnie Lane - vocals, guitar, bass guitar
Kenney Jones - drums
Ian McLagan - keyboards, guitar, bass guitar, vocals, flute
Jimmy Winston - vocals, keyboards

== References/Notes ==
Notes:

References:

- Paolo Hewitt John Hellier (2004). Steve Marriott - All Too Beautiful.... Helter Skelter Publishing ISBN 1-900924-44-7.
- Paolo Hewitt/Kenney Jones (1995) small faces the young mods' forgotten story - Acid Jazz ISBN 0-9523935-0-6

== See also ==
- Small Faces discography
