= Plashet =

Human settlement in Greater London, England

Coordinates: 51.541638°N 0.045716°E

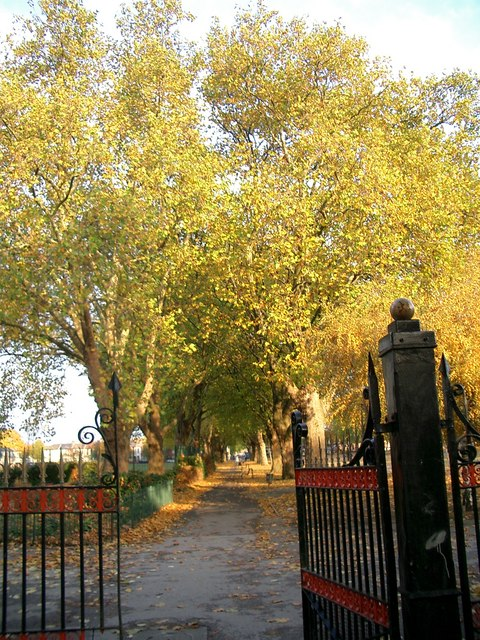
- Western gate to Plashet Park

- Location within Greater London
- London borough: Newham
- Ceremonial county: Greater London
- Region: London
- Country: England
- Sovereign state: United Kingdom
- Post town: LONDON
- Postcode district: E6/E7
- Dialling code: 020
- Police: Metropolitan
- Fire: London
- Ambulance: London
- London Assembly: City and East

Plashet is a locality of East Ham in the London Borough of Newham in East London located between West Ham (Upton Park) and Manor Park. It contains Plashet Jewish Cemetery, Plashet Park, and several places of worship.

The area was home to prison reformer Elizabeth Fry, who lived in Plashet House from 1809 to 1829, and also her daughter Katherine who lived in Plashet Cottage. Both of these properties were demolished in the 1880s to make way for the terraced streets that now characterise the area.

Steve Marriott lead singer of the Small Faces was born at East Ham Memorial Hospital located in the Plashet area.

The poet Benjamin Zephaniah also lived in Plashet.
