= Dateline Diamonds =

1966 British film by Jeremy Summers

- Theatrical release poster
- Directed by: Jeremy Summers
- Written by: Tudor Gates (based on an original idea by Harold Shampan)
- Produced by: Harry Benn
- Starring: Musical guests: Small Faces; The Chantelles; Kiki Dee; Mark Richardson; Acting roles: William Lucas, Kenneth Cope, Conrad Phillips, Patsy Rowlands, Kenny Everett
- Cinematography: Stephen Dade
- Distributed by: Rank Organisation
- Release date: 3 April 1966
- Running time: 73 minutes
- Country: United Kingdom
- Language: English

Dateline Diamonds is a 1966 black and white British music film directed by Jeremy Summers and starring William Lucas, Kenneth Cope and the Small Faces.

It is an example of the "pop and cop" genre of film, which was popular in the UK during the early 1960s and was intended to present young musical talents to the teenage market. The film was a low-budget B movie and was released as a supporting feature to Doctor in Clover (1966).

== Plot ==
Major Fairclough is linked to an international criminal gang that uses the MV Galaxy (the ship which was the home of the pirate radio station Radio London) to smuggle stolen diamonds from the UK to Amsterdam. Fairclough blackmails Lester Benson, the fictitious manager of the Small Faces, into aiding and abetting his crimes.

== Production ==
The film features the original lineup of the British band the Small Faces (Jimmy Winston was replaced in 1966 by Ian McLagan). The band's manager, Don Arden, arranged for the Small Faces to appear in the film as a promotional vehicle for "I've Got Mine", the November 1965 follow-up to their debut hit single "Whatcha Gonna Do About It". However, the film's release was delayed until April 1966 and the band received no other publicity for the single, which failed to chart. The final sequence, showing Rey Anton and Pro Forma, Mark Richardson and the Small Faces performing on stage, was filmed during a genuine Radio London night at the Rank Ballroom in Watford.

The film was made at Pinewood Studios and on location.

Dateline Diamonds has been released on VHS and DVD.

== Cast list ==
- William Lucas as Major Fairclough
- Kenneth Cope as Lester Benson
- George Mikell as Paul Verlekt
- Conrad Phillips as Tom Jenkins
- Patsy Rowlands as Mrs Edgecumbe
- Burnell Tucker as Dale Meredith (a fictitious DJ)
- Anna Carteret as Gay Jenkins
- Vanda Godsell as Mrs Jenkins
- Gertan Klauber as Meyerhof
- Doel Luscombe as assistant commissioner
- Peter Zander as Spankaren
- Geoffrey Lumsden as army officer
- Ronald Bridges as garage attendant
- David Kirk as dock policeman
- Phillip Birch
- Earl Richmond
- Ben Toney

=== Guest Artistes ===
- The Small Faces
- The Chantelles
- Kiki Dee
- Mark Richardson
- Kenny Everett

== Critical reception ==
The Monthly Film Bulletin wrote: "An uninspired attempt to capture two markets by combining sleuthing with pop music. Neither element is in any way distinguished, and the intervals for music merely slow down the detection,"
