= Sha-La-La-La-Lee =

- Italian picture sleeve

Single by Small Faces
- B-side: "Grow Your Own"
- Released: 28 January 1966
- Recorded: 13 December 1965
- Studio: IBC, London
- Genre: Rock, beat
- Length: 2:56
- Label: Decca
- Songwriters: Kenny Lynch; Mort Shuman
- Producer: Kenny Lynch

Small Faces singles chronology
"I've Got Mine" (1965)	"Sha-La-La-La-Lee" (1966)	"Hey Girl" (1966)

"Sha-La-La-La-Lee" is a song by the English rock band Small Faces. Released in January 1966, the single reached number three in the UK on the Record Retailer chart. On the New Zealand listener chart it peaked at #8. It was also the first single by the group to feature Ian McLagan on keyboards.

== Background ==
Because Small Faces' previous song release, the Marriott/Lane composition "I've Got Mine," failed to chart in the UK, their manager, Don Arden, determined that the Small Faces would not be one hit wonders, decided to bring in well-known songwriters Kenny Lynch and Mort Shuman to make sure the group's next single would be a success.

"Sha-La-La-La-Lee" was recorded on 13 December 1965 at IBC Studios in London with audio engineer John Pantry.

== Release and commercial performance ==
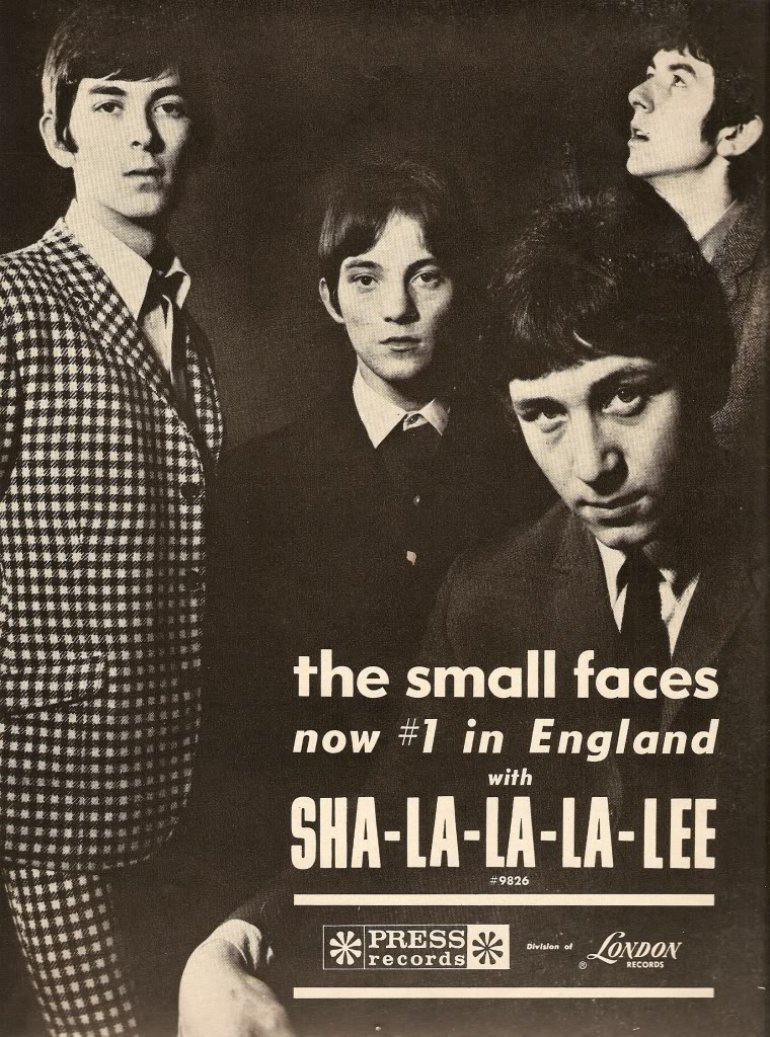
Trade ad for the single

Although intended to have been released on 14 January 1966, "Sha-La-La-La-Lee" was released on 28 January through Decca, with "Grow Your Own" on the B-side. (Note: Catalogue number Decca F 12317.) Hellier and Hewitt speculate that Arden made a few "arrangements" to ensure the single would become a hit, and that the band's hectic touring schedule played part. As such, the Small Faces were called to perform on a few major television shows to promote the single, including Scene At 6:30 (26 January), Ready Steady Go! (28 January), Thank Your Lucky Stars (5 February) and Top of the Pops (17 February). In the United States, the single was issued through London Records. (Note: Catalogue number 45 9826.) In conjunction with the US release, Small Faces were filmed in London performing "Whatcha Gonna Do About It?" and "Sha-La-La-La Lee" for the American television show Where the Action Is.

The commercial-sounding song proved a big hit and reached number three in the UK singles chart. Despite the success of "Sha-La-La-La-Lee," the band never really liked the song and felt it did not represent their sound, which was more R&B- and soul-oriented.

Following the huge success of this song, the band developed a large female fan base, like many of their contemporaries. This situation would ultimately end in Marriott becoming so disenchanted that he would leave The Small Faces in 1969 in a bid to be seen as a serious musician and form his next group, the heavier rock- and blues-sounding Humble Pie.

== B-side ==
The B-side "Grow Your Own" written by the band, is an instrumental recording and strongly influenced in style by Booker T. & the M.G.'s, of whom all the group were big fans. "Grow Your Own" heavily features Ian McLagan on the Hammond organ.

== Usage ==
In Japan, "Sha-La-La-La-Lee", arranged to French pop style, was used for the advertisement of Suzuki Alto Lapin.

It was used in the second episode of the first season of the 2019 British TV series, Sex Education.

== Personnel ==
Personnel adapted from the 2012 re-issue of Small Faces and the 2025 re-issue of The Autumn Stone, unless otherwise noted.

Small Faces

- Steve Marriott – lead vocals, electric guitar
- Ronnie Lane – bass guitar, backing vocals
- Ian McLagan – Hammond organ, Hohner Pianet, backing vocals
- Kenney Jones – drums, percussion, cowbells

Other personnel

- Kenny Lynch – backing vocals
- John Pantry – audio engineer

== Charts ==
Weekly chart performance for "Sha-La-La-La-Lee"
Chart (1966)	Peak position
Australia (Kent Music Report)	51
Belgium (Ultratop 50 Wallonia)	49
Netherlands (Dutch Top 40)	31
Malaysia (Radio Malaysia)	9
New Zealand (Listener)	8
Singapore (Radio Television Singapore)	5
UK (Disc Weekly)	1
UK (New Musical Express)	2
UK (Melody Maker)	1
UK (Record Retailer)	3
West Germany (Media Control)	15

== See also ==
- Small Faces discography
