= 78 in the Shade =

Studio album by Small Faces
- Released: 9 September 1978
- Recorded: Beehive Cottage with Island Mobile
- Genres: Rock, rhythm and blues
- Length: 32:54
- Label: Atlantic
- Producers: Kemastri (Acronym for Ke = Kenny Jones, Ma = Ian McLagan, St = Steve Marriott, Ri = Rick Wills)

Small Faces chronology
Playmates (1977)	78 in the Shade (1978)	The BBC Sessions (1999)

Professional ratings
Review scores
Source	Rating
Allmusic	2/5 stars

78 in the Shade is the fifth and final studio album by Small Faces, and the second during their reunion. It was released on the Atlantic label in 1978 and reissued in 2005 on Wounded Bird. The album was created during the brief reunion of the band in the 1970s. The follow-up to the reunion album Playmates, 78, like its predecessor, was not successful and the band broke up soon afterwards. Mainstream music in Britain was rapidly changing direction, punk rock having been established around this time.

Guitarist Jimmy McCulloch briefly joined this line-up after leaving Wings. When McCulloch phoned Paul McCartney, who had found him increasingly difficult to work with, to announce he was joining Marriott, McCartney reportedly said "I was a little put out at first, but, well, what can you say to that?" McCulloch's tenure with the band lasted only for a few months in late 1977. 78 in the Shade was his only album with the band.

== Reception ==
78 in the Shade generally gained indifferent to negative reviews. Allmusic gave the album a review of 2 stars out of five.

The album was reissued as part of “The Complete Atlantic Collection” with the previous album “Playmates” and a single on Wounded Bird in 2021.

== Track listing ==
Side one
No.	Title	Writer(s)	Length
1.	"Over Too Soon"	Marriott, McLagan	3:07
2.	"Too Many Crossroads"	Marriott, McLagan	2:18
3.	"Let Me Down Gently"	McLagan, John Pidgeon	3:38
4.	"Thinkin' About Love"	Wills	3:46
5.	"Stand by Me (Stand by You)"	Marriott	3:26

Side two
No.	Title	Writer(s)	Length
6.	"Brown Man Do"	Marriott	3:02
7.	"Real Sour"	McLagan, John Pidgeon	3:55
8.	"Soldier"	Joe Brown	4:04
9.	"You Ain't Seen Nothing Yet"	Marriott, McLagan, Wills, Jones	2:59
10.	"Filthy Rich"	Marriott	2:39

== Personnel ==
Small Faces

- Steve Marriott – guitar, vocals
- Ian McLagan – keyboards, vocals
- Rick Wills – bass guitar, vocals
- Kenney Jones – drums, vocals

with:

- Jimmy McCulloch (credited only as "Thanks") – lead guitar on "Thinking About Love" and "You Ain't Seen Nothing Yet"
- Vicki Brown, Helen Chappelle, Lavinia Rogers, Madeline Bell, Liza Strike, Sam Brown, Jimmy McCulloch, Stephen Smith, Greg Cobb, Nick Webb – backing vocals

Technical

- John Wright – engineer
- Larry Franklin – cover illustration
- Brian Aris – photography
