= Playmates (album) =

Studio album by Small Faces
- Released: 12 August 1977
- Recorded: 1977
- Studios: Grange Sound Studios, Chigwell, Essex
- Genre: Rock
- Length: 41:28
- Label: Atlantic
- Producers: Kemastri (Acronym for Ke = Kenny Jones, Ma = Ian McLagan, St = Steve Marriott, Ri = Rick Wills); Shel Talmy on "Lookin' for a Love"

Small Faces chronology
The Autumn Stone (1969)	Playmates (1977)	78 in the Shade (1978)

Playmates is the fourth studio album, and the first during their reunion, by English rock band the Small Faces. The album was created by Steve Marriott, Ian McLagan, Kenney Jones and Rick Wills when they reformed in the late 1970s and recorded it along with the album 78 in the Shade. Ronnie Lane left before the album was recorded.

== Reunion: 1975–1978 ==
Following the break-up of Faces in 1975, the original Small Faces line-up reformed briefly to film videos miming to the reissued "Itchycoo Park", which hit the charts again. The group tried recording together again but Lane left after the first rehearsal due to an argument. Unbeknownst to the others, he was just beginning to show the symptoms of multiple sclerosis, and his behaviour was misinterpreted by Marriott and the others as a drunken tantrum. Lane subsequently began recording Rough Mix with the Who's Pete Townshend shortly after the argument.

Nevertheless, McLagan, Jones and Marriott decided to stay together as Small Faces, recruiting ex-Peter Frampton and Roxy Music bassist Rick Wills to take Lane's place. This iteration of Small Faces recorded two albums: Playmates (1977) and 78 in the Shade (1978), released on Atlantic Records. Both albums were later reissued on Wounded Bird Records. Guitarist Jimmy McCulloch also briefly joined this line-up after leaving Wings. When McCulloch phoned Paul McCartney, who had found him increasingly difficult to work with, to announce he was joining Marriott, McCartney reportedly said "I was a little put out at first, but, well, what can you say to that?" McCulloch's tenure with the band lasted only for a few months in late 1977. He recorded only one album, 78 in the Shade, in 1978 with the band. The reunion albums were commercial failures. Small Faces broke up again in 1978.

== Critical reception ==
Professional ratings
Review scores
Source	Rating
AllMusic	2.5/5 stars

The New York Times called the album "decently entertaining blues-rock," and noted that "the playing is a lot tighter than the more sloppily rambunctious days of the Faces."

== Track listing ==
Side one
No.	Title	Writer(s)	Length
1.	"High and Happy"	Steve Marriott	2:42
2.	"Never Too Late"	Marriott; Ian McLagan	3:50
3.	"Tonight"	McLagan; John Pidgeon	2:47
4.	"Saylarvee"	Marriott	2:17
5.	"Find It"	Marriott; McLagan; Kenney Jones	6:01

Side two
No.	Title	Writer(s)	Length
6.	"Lookin' for a Love"	J. W. Alexander; Zelda Samuels	3:13
7.	"Playmates"	Marriott	3:37
8.	"This Song's Just For You"	Marriott; McLagan	4:06
9.	"Drive-In Romance"	McLagan; Pidgeon	5:11
10.	"Smilin' in Tune"	Marriott; McLagan	4:44

== In popular culture ==
Ringo Starr covered the song "Tonight" on his studio album Bad Boy, in 1978.

== Personnel ==
Small Faces

- Steve Marriott – guitar, harmonica, vocals
- Ian McLagan – keyboards, vocals
- Rick Wills – bass guitar, vocals
- Kenney Jones – drums, vocals

with:

- Dave Hynes – backing vocals
- Greg Ridley – backing vocals
- P.P. Arnold – backing vocals
- Vicki Brown – backing vocals
- Joe Brown – mandolin, acoustic guitar, backing vocals
- Mel Collins – saxophone
