= I've Got Mine =

- Swedish picture sleeve

Single by Small Faces
- B-side: "It's Too Late"
- Released: 5 November 1965
- Recorded: 11–12 and 14 October 1965
- Studio: Pye, London
- Genre: Rock, beat
- Length: 2:54
- Label: Decca
- Songwriter(s): Steve Marriott; Ronnie Lane
- Producer(s): Ian Samwell

Small Faces singles chronology
"Whatcha Gonna Do About It" (1965)	"I've Got Mine" (1965)	"Sha-La-La-La-Lee" (1966)

"I've Got Mine" is a song by the English rock band Small Faces. Released in 1965, the single failed to chart, but received favourable reviews in the British music press.

"I've Got Mine" is a hard-hitting, moody R&B song and the first Small Faces single release written entirely by the songwriting duo of the band, Steve Marriott and Ronnie Lane, and features Marriott on main vocals. The song's release was planned to coincide with the release of 'pop/cop' crime film Dateline Diamonds about diamond smugglers. Small Faces appear in the film performing the song, however, the film was not shown in cinemas until long after the single was released into the UK singles chart and so the group lost out on the expected media exposure and publicity. The song was revisited by the band in 1968, reworking it as an instrumental that served as the introductory title track from the album Ogden's Nut Gone Flake.

It was after the release of "I've Got Mine" that Jimmy Winston was released from the band and replaced by keyboardist Ian McLagan (formerly of The Muleskinners). Winston co-wrote the B-side "It's Too Late" with Marriott and Lane.

Dateline Diamonds was mainly conceived by music publisher, Harold Shampan, as a publicity vehicle for up-and-coming talent. The plot revolves around smuggling diamonds between the Netherlands and the UK, via the ship, the MV Galaxy, concealed inside the band's demo tape boxes (unbeknownst to the Wonderful Radio London management). It featured the actors William Lucas, Kenneth Cope, George Mikell, Conrad Phillips, DJ Kenny Everett (as himself) and Patsy Rowlands. It was directed by Jeremy Summers.

== Personnel ==
Small Faces

- Steve Marriott – lead vocals, rhythm guitar
- Ronnie Lane – bass guitar, backing vocals
- Kenny Jones – drums
- Jimmy Winston – lead guitar, backing vocals

== See also ==
- Small Faces discography

== References/Notes ==
Notes:

References:

- Paolo Hewitt John Hellier (2004). Steve Marriott - All Too Beautiful.... Helter Skelter Publishing ISBN 1-900924-44-7.
- Paolo Hewitt/Kenney Jones (1995) small faces the young mods' forgotten story – Acid Jazz ISBN 0-9523935-0-6
