= Peter Zander (actor) =

German-born British actor (1922–2019)

- Born: Peter Zander; 9 July 1922; Berlin, Germany
- Died: 18 January 2019 (aged 96); London, England
- Occupation: Actor
- Years active: 1959–1994

Peter Zander (9 July 1922 – 18 January 2019) was a German-born British actor. Zander was born in July 1922 in Berlin, but emigrated to England in 1933 with his parents. He died in January 2019 in a care home, after succumbing to the effects of a stroke suffered in 2012.

== Filmography ==
| Year | Title | Role | Notes |
|---|---|---|---|
| 1961 | The Devil's Daffodil | Sicherheitsbeamter | Uncredited |
| 1962 | Mystery Submarine | Lt. Jahn | |
| 1963 | Face in the Rain | | |
| 1965 | Rotten to the Core | German A.D.C. | |
| 1965 | Dateline Diamonds | Spankharen | |
| 1965 | The Return of Mr. Moto | Charles Ginelli | |
