= Jimmy Winston =

British musician (1945–2020)

- Winston in 1965

Background information
- Birth name: James Edward Winston Langwith
- Born: 20 April 1945; Stratford, Essex, England
- Died: 26 September 2020 (aged 75)
- Occupations: Musician; actor
- Instruments: Guitar; keyboards; vocals
- Labels: Decca; RCA; Nems

James Edward Winston Langwith (20 April 1945 – 26 September 2020), known professionally as Jimmy Winston, was an English musician and actor. He was the original keyboard player with the rock band Small Faces.

Winston's acting credits include the stage musical Hair (1968) and the Doctor Who serial Day of the Daleks (1972).

== Small Faces ==
In early 1965, Winston, along with his acquaintance Steve Marriott, formed Small Faces with Ronnie Lane and Kenney Jones. While originally a guitarist, his role was soon shifted to become a keyboardist. Winston was fundamental in the band's emergence, as his parents owned the Ruskin Arms pub located in Manor Park, a place where the group would rehearse and occasionally perform. After a performance at the Cavern Club on Leicester Square, an assistant of manager Don Arden stepped up to the band and managed to secure them a contract with Decca Records. The band released their debut single "Whatcha Gonna Do About It" later that year, peaking at number 14. The success of this single would be followed by "I've Got Mine", which despite good reviews failed to chart. The group including Winston performed the song in Dateline Diamonds (1965). Shortly after this release, Winston left the group, and was promptly replaced by Ian McLagan.

A factor that has been rumoured about his termination is that during an episode of Thank Your Lucky Stars, Winston snubbed Marriott. There has been controversy whether Winston left the group himself or was fired. Lane stated in an interview that he was fired:

Our original organist, Jimmy Winston, wasn't working out. He couldn't play – I mean, none of us could play, but we was keen. Jimmy Winston couldn't play, and on top of it he had an ego as if he could play the piano, so he had to go! We chucked him out of the Small Faces. Very exciting times, the Sixties, there'll never be another time like it, I'm sure.

— Ronnie Lane, Small Faces Talk to You: The story of the Small Faces in their own words

However, Kenney Jones later said: "He [Winston] got above his station and tried to compete with Steve Marriott."

== Music post-Small Faces ==
Soon after being kicked out of Small Faces, Winston led his own group called Jimmy Winston and His Reflections. The group was short-lived. He would later be a member of another short-lived group called Winston's Fumbs in 1967.

== Acting ==
Winston was also an actor. His debut film role was as a member of Small Faces in the film Dateline Diamonds (1965), although his first role as an actor was in an episode of the 1969 series Doctor in the House, portraying "Hairy". He appeared in the Doctor Who serial Day of the Daleks (1972), starring Jon Pertwee as the Doctor, and his film and television credits would continue until the early 1980s.

Winston's last appearance on television was when he appeared on the show BBC2 Playhouse in 1983. Winston's next credit would not be for another 26 years, when he was interviewed for the Small Faces documentary Small Faces: All or Nothing 1965–1968 in 2009.

== Death ==
Winston died on 26 September 2020, aged 75, after suffering from mesothelioma.

== Discography ==
=== Solo ===
"Sun in the Morning" / "Just Wanna Smile" (1976)

=== with Small Faces ===
(While he is credited as the sole keyboardist on their first two singles, Winston is also credited on some tracks on four further albums released by the band)

- "Whatcha Gonna Do About It" / "What's A Matter Baby" (1965)
- "I've Got Mine" / "It's Too Late" (1965)
- Small Faces (1966)
- From the Beginning (1967)
- The Autumn Stone (1969)
- The BBC Sessions (1999)

=== with Jimmy Winston and His Reflections ===
"Sorry She's Mine" / "It's Not What You Do (But the Way That You Do It)" (1966)

=== with Winston's Fumbs ===
"Real Crazy Apartment" / "Snow White" (1967)

== Filmography ==
Title	Year	Role	Director	Notes
Dateline Diamonds	1966	Himself	Jeremy Summers	as a member of Small Faces
Doctor in the House	1969	Hairy	David Askey	Episode: The Students Are Revolting!
Never a Cross Word	1969	Hippie	David Askey	Episode: Sir or Madam
No Blade of Grass	1970	1st Hun.	Cornel Wilde	
UFO	1970	Rating	Ken Turner	Episode: Destruction
The Ballad of Tam Lin	1970	Second Coven	Roddy McDowall	
Day of the Daleks	1972	Shura	Paul Bernard	Episodes 1, 2 & 4.
Justice	1973	Cyril Butler	James Ormerod	Episode: Covenant for Quiet Enjoyment
The Sweeney	1978	Sid (uncredited)		Episode: Hearts and Mind
BBC2 Playhouse	1983	Flash Man	Jim O'Brien	Episode: Jake's End
Small Faces: All or Nothing 1965–1968	2009	Himself	David Peck	as a member of Small Faces, and also interviews
