= Marriott (album) =

Studio album by Steve Marriott
- Released: 1976
- Genre: Rock
- Length: 41:11
- Label: A&M Records
- Producer: Kenny Kerner, Richie Wise

Steve Marriott chronology
Street Rats (1975)	Marriott (1976)	On to Victory (1980)

Professional ratings
Review scores
Source	Rating
AllMusic	4/5 stars

Marriott is Steve Marriott's debut solo album from 1976 and features a British and an American side, reflecting the make-up of the bands backing Steve Marriott. The British side includes former Humble Pie colleague Greg Ridley on bass and singing backing vocals.

== Track listings ==
All tracks written by Steve Marriott unless otherwise noted

British Side

1. East Side Struttin' (Marriott, Finn) – 4:47
2. Lookin' for a Love (Alexander, Samuels) – 3:44
3. Help Me Through the Day (Leon Russell) – 5:52
4. Midnight Rollin' (Marriott, Stephens) – 3:30
5. Wham Bam Thank You Ma'am (Marriott, Lane) – 3:57

American Side

1. Star In My Life (Marriott, Wallace)– 3:31
2. Are You Lonely For Me Baby (B. Berns) – 3:51
3. You Don't Know Me (C. Walker, E. Arnold) – 4:55
4. Late Night Lady (Marriott, Hinkley, Ridley) – 3:02
5. Early Evening Light (Marriott) – 4:02

== Personnel ==
- Steve Marriott – Lead vocals, Guitar
- Mickey Finn – Guitar on Tracks 1–5
- David Spinozza – Guitar on Track 10
- Ben Benay – Guitar on Tracks 6–10
- Red Rhodes – Pedal Steel on Tracks 6–10
- Greg Ridley – Bass Guitar on Tracks 1–5, Backing vocals on Tracks 1–10
- Dennis Kovarik – Bass Guitar on Tracks 6–10
- Michael Baird – Drums on Tracks 6–10
- Ian Wallace – Drums on Tracks 1–5, Percussion on Tracks 6–10
- David Foster – Keyboards on Tracks 6–10
- Ernie Watts – Saxophone on Tracks 6–10
- Alan Estes – Congas on Tracks 6–10
- Venetta Fields – Backing vocals on Tracks 2,6–10
- Carlena Williams – Backing vocals on Tracks 2,6–10
- Maxayn Lewis – Backing vocals on Tracks 2,6–10
