= Small Faces =

English rock band

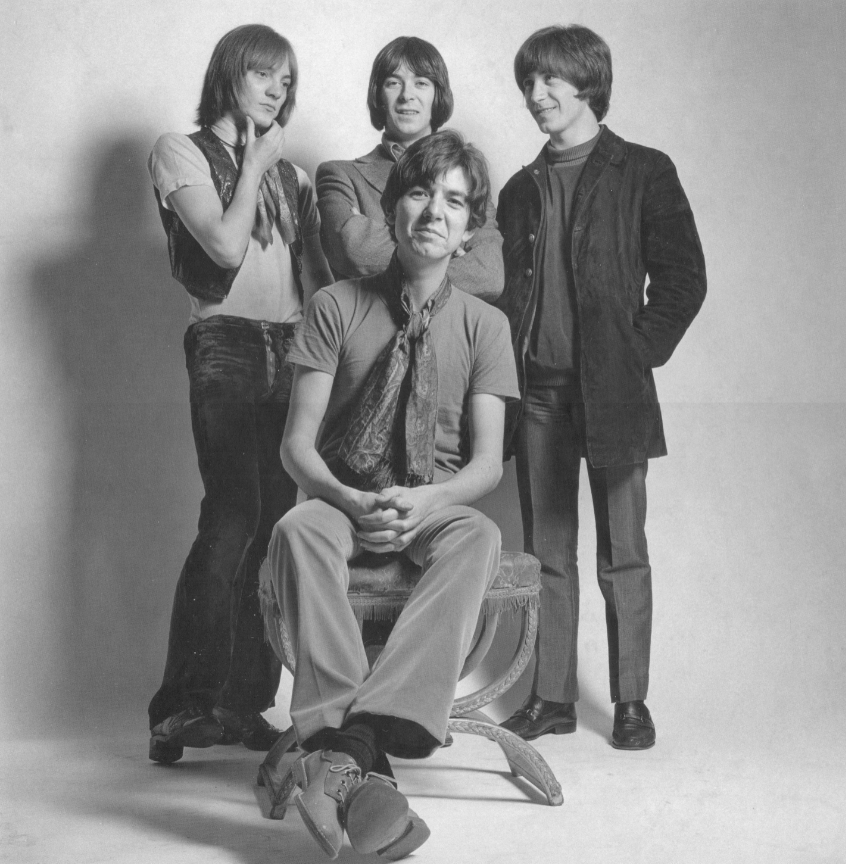
- Small Faces in late 1968; clockwise from bottom: Ronnie Lane, Steve Marriott, Ian McLagan, Kenney Jones

Background information
- Origin: London, England
- Genres: Rock; R&B; pop; freakbeat; psychedelia
- Years active: 1965–1969; 1975–1978
- Labels: Decca; RCA Victor; Immediate; Atlantic
- Spinoffs: Faces; Humble Pie
- Past members: Kenney Jones; Steve Marriott; Ronnie Lane; Jimmy Winston; Ian McLagan; Rick Wills; Jimmy McCulloch
- Website: thesmallfaces.com

The Small Faces were an English rock and pop band from London, founded in 1965. The group originally consisted of singer/guitarist Steve Marriott, bassist Ronnie Lane, drummer Kenney Jones and keyboardist Jimmy Winston, with Ian McLagan replacing Winston in 1966. The band were initially one of the most acclaimed and influential mod groups of the mid-1960s, with hit singles such as "Whatcha Gonna Do About It" (1965), "Sha-La-La-La-Lee" and "All or Nothing" (both 1966). From 1967, they evolved into one of the UK's most successful psychedelic bands, achieving further hit singles including "Here Come the Nice", "Itchycoo Park", "Tin Soldier" (all 1967) and "Lazy Sunday" (1968), the latter taken from their critically-acclaimed concept album Ogdens' Nut Gone Flake (1968), which reached No. 1 on the UK Albums Chart.

In 1969, Marriott left to form Humble Pie, while Lane, Jones and McLagan continued under the shortened name Faces with Rod Stewart and Ronnie Wood. Following the breakup of both the Faces and Humble Pie in 1975, the classic Marriott/Lane/McLagan/Jones line-up of the Small Faces re-formed after a re-release of "Itchycoo Park" became a top-ten hit. Lane left shortly thereafter, and was replaced by Rick Wills (later of Foreigner). This line-up (dubbed Mk-II by Marriott) recorded one album, Playmates (1977), before adding former Wings guitarist Jimmy McCulloch for a second reunion album, 78 in the Shade (1978). The band split for a second and final time in 1978.

The Small Faces have been considered one of the early inspirations for – and even an early root of – the Britpop movement. English music journalist Jon Savage has called them "the one Brit group that prefigures the early Sex Pistols" (who themselves covered "Whatcha Gonna Do About It"). In 2012, the Small Faces and their successor band the Faces were jointly inducted into the Rock and Roll Hall of Fame.

The Small Faces have been referred to by sources such as Record Collector magazine and AllMusic as freakbeat, a retrospective genre of intense and raw music bridging British rhythm and blues with psychedelia.

== History ==
=== Origins (1965) ===
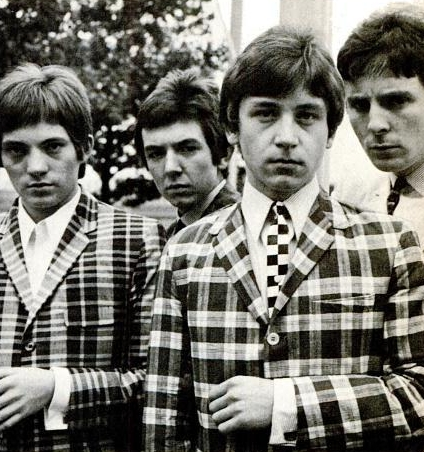
Small Faces in 1965 (left to right) Marriott, Lane, Jones and Winston

==== Formation (1965) ====
Singer and guitarist Steve Marriott and bassist Ronnie Lane first met in early 1965, while Marriott was working at the J60 Music Bar in Manor Park, London. Lane came in with his father Stan to buy a bass guitar, struck up a conversation with Marriott, bought the bass and went back to Marriott's house after work to listen to records. They recruited friends Kenney Jones on drums and Jimmy Winston on organ and guitar. They rapidly progressed from rehearsals at The Ruskin Arms public house (which was owned by Winston's parents) in Manor Park, London, to ramshackle pub gigs, to semi-professional club dates. The group chose the name, "Small Faces", because of the members' small physical stature and a "face" was somebody special; more than just a snappy dresser, he was someone in mod circles as a leader, someone to look up to. A face had the sharpest clothes, the best records, and always was seen with the prettiest girl on his arm.

==== Early stage performances (1965) ====
The band's early song set included R&B/soul classics such as "Jump Back", James Brown's "Please Please Please", Smokey Robinson's "You've Really Got a Hold on Me" and Ben E. King's "Stand by Me". The band also performed two Marriott/Lane original compositions, a fast and loud "Come on Children" and the "speed enhanced" song "E too D", in which Marriott would display his considerable vocal abilities in the style of his heroes and role models, Otis Redding and Bobby Bland. "E too D", which appears on their first album, Small Faces, is named after the guitar chord structure. On US compilation albums the track is titled "Running Wild". Marriott's unique and powerful voice attracted rising attention. Singer Elkie Brooks was struck by Marriott's vocal prowess and stage presence, and recommended them to a local club owner, Maurice King. Impressed, King began finding them work in London and beyond. Their first out-of-London concert was at a working men's club in Sheffield. Since the crowd was mainly made up of Teddy boys and hard-drinking workers, the band were paid off after three songs. Despondent, they walked into Peter Stringfellow’s mod-orientated Mojo Club nearby and offered to perform for free. They played a set that left the local mods wanting more. During a crucial residency at Leicester Square's Cavern Club, they were supported by Sonny & Cher, who were living in London at the time.

=== Decca years (1965–67) ===
==== Signing to Decca and first two singles (1965) ====
The band signed a management contract with management impresario Don Arden, and they were in turn signed to Decca Records for recording. They released a string of high-energy mod/soul singles on the label. Their debut single, "Whatcha Gonna Do About It", was released in August 1965 and became a Top 20 UK singles chart hit. Marriott and Lane are credited with creating the instrumental to the song, "borrowing" the guitar riff from the Solomon Burke record "Everybody Needs Somebody to Love". The lyrics were co-written by the Drifters band member Ian Samwell (who wrote one of the first British rock'n'roll records, "Move It") and Brian Potter.

The group failed to capitalise on the success of their first single with the follow-up, which was written by Marriott/Lane, the hard-edged mod number "I've Got Mine". The band appeared as themselves in a 1965 crime film titled Dateline Diamonds starring Kenneth Cope as the band's manager and it featured the band playing their second single release. Arden thought the band's song would receive publicity from the film; however, the film's UK release was delayed, and "I've Got Mine" subsequently failed to chart despite receiving good reviews.

Shortly thereafter, Jimmy Winston left the band for an acting and music solo career. He went on to succeed as an actor in TV, film and became a successful business man. In a 2000 interview, Kenney Jones said the reason Winston was fired from the band was because "He (Winston) got above his station and tried to compete with Steve Marriott." Winston subsequently said he left the group over conflicts between Arden and Winston's brother.

==== First album, further hit singles, and From the Beginning (1966–67) ====
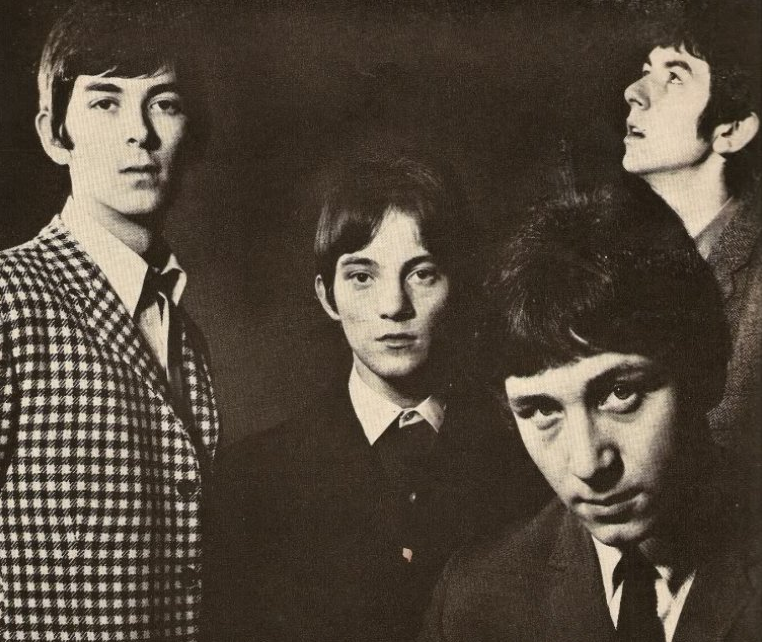
Small Faces in 1966

Winston was replaced by Ian McLagan, whose keyboard talents and diminutive stature fit with the groove of the band perfectly. McLagan played his first performance with the band on 2 November 1965. The new Small Faces line-up hit the charts with their third single, "Sha-La-La-La-Lee", released on 28 January 1966. It was written for the group by Mort Shuman (who wrote many of Elvis Presley's biggest singles, including "Viva Las Vegas") and popular English entertainer and singer Kenny Lynch. The song was a big hit in Britain, peaking at number three in the UK singles chart. Their first album, Small Faces, released on 6 May 1966, was also a considerable success. They rapidly rose in popularity with each chart success, becoming regulars on British pop TV shows such as Ready Steady Go! and Top of the Pops, and toured incessantly in the UK and Europe. Their popularity peaked in August 1966, when "All or Nothing", their fifth single, hit the top of the UK charts. According to Marriott's mother Kay, he is said to have written the song about his breakup with his ex-fiancée Susan Oliver. On the success of "All or Nothing" they were set to tour America with the Lovin' Spoonful and the Mamas & the Papas, but these plans were shelved by Don Arden after details of Ian McLagan's recent drug conviction were leaked.

By 1966, despite being one of the highest-grossing live acts in the country and scoring many successful singles, including four UK Top 10 chart hits, the group still had little money. After a confrontation with Arden who tried to face down the boys' parents by claiming that the whole band were using drugs, they broke with both Arden and Decca.

In June 1967, Decca released the compilation album From The Beginning, combining the band's hits with a number of previously unreleased recordings. It included earlier versions of songs the band would re-record when they signed to the new label Immediate, including "My Way of Giving", which they had demoed for Chris Farlowe, and "(Tell Me) Have You Ever Seen Me?", which they had given to Apostolic Intervention. The album also featured their stage favourite "Baby Don't You Do It", featuring Jimmy Winston on lead vocals and guitar.

=== Immediate years (1967–69) ===
==== "Here Come the Nice" and second studio album (1967) ====
They were almost straight away offered a deal with the newly established Immediate label, formed by ex-Rolling Stones manager Andrew Loog Oldham. Given a virtual open account at Olympic Studios in Barnes, London, the band progressed rapidly, working closely with engineer Glyn Johns. Their first Immediate single was the daring "Here Come the Nice", which was clearly influenced by their drug use, and managed to escape censorship despite the fact that it openly referred to the dealer who sold drugs. A second self-titled studio album, Small Faces, followed, which, if not a major seller, was very highly regarded by other musicians and would exert a strong influence on a number of bands both at home and abroad.

==== "Itchycoo Park", "Tin Soldier", There Are But Four Small Faces and "Lazy Sunday" (1967–68) ====
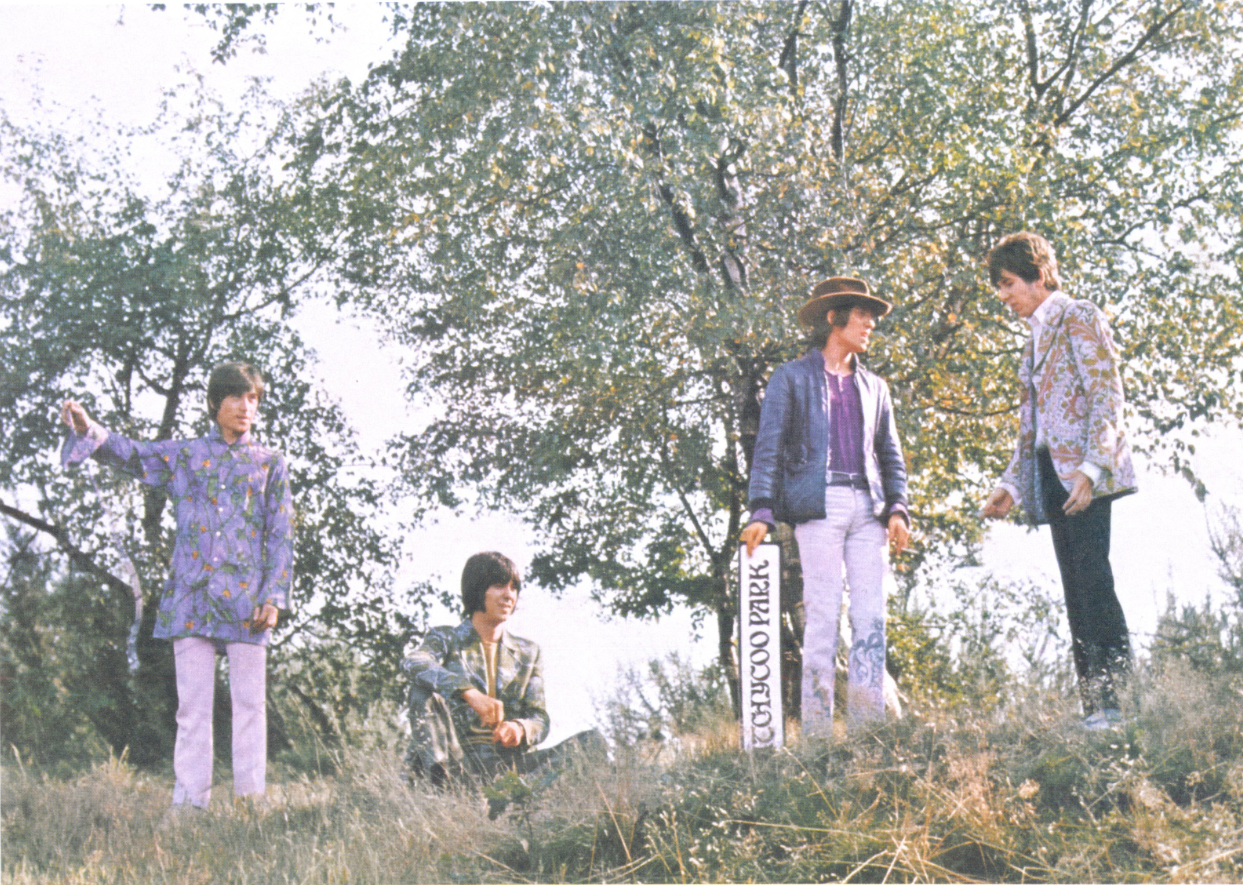
Small Faces in 1967. This photo was later used as the album cover for their US-only album There Are But Four Small Faces

The band's following single "Itchycoo Park", released on 11 August 1967, was the first of the band's two charting singles in the United States, reaching No. 16 in January 1968. The single was a bigger hit in Britain, peaking at No. 3. "Itchycoo Park" was the first British single to use flanging, the technique of playing two identical master tapes simultaneously but altering the speed of one of them very slightly by touching the "flange" of one tape reel, which yielded a distinctive comb-filtering effect. The effect had been applied by Olympic Studios engineer George Chkiantz. "Itchycoo Park" was followed in December 1967 by "Tin Soldier", written by Marriott. Also, the track features American singer P. P. Arnold on backing vocals. The song was quite a hit reaching No. 9 on the UK charts and No. 73 on the U.S. Hot 100 chart. The Immediate Small Faces album was eventually released in the United States as There Are But Four Small Faces, with a considerable track change, including singles "Here Come The Nice", "Itchycoo Park", and "Tin Soldier", but eliminating several UK album tracks. The next single "Lazy Sunday", released in 1968, was an East End music-hall style song released by Immediate against the band's wishes. It was written by Marriott inspired by the feuds with his neighbours and recorded as a joke. The single reached No. 2 in the UK charts.

==== Ogdens' Nut Gone Flake (1968) ====
At home in England, their career reached its all-time high with the release of their psychedelic concept album Ogdens' Nut Gone Flake on 24 May 1968. The album was issued with an innovative round packaging design, the first of its kind, intended to resemble an antique tobacco tin. It stayed at No. 1 in the UK Albums Chart for six weeks, but reached only No. 159 in the US.

The album consisted of six individual songs on side one and a whimsical psychedelic fairy tale on side two, telling the story of "Happiness Stan" and his adventures during his search for the missing half of the moon. It was narrated by Stanley Unwin, after original plans to have Spike Milligan narrate the album went awry when he turned them down.

Critics were enthusiastic, and the album sold well, but the band were confronted by the practical problem that they had created an album which was virtually impossible to recreate on the road. Ogdens' was performed in its entirety just once, live in the studio on the BBC television programme Colour Me Pop.

==== "The Universal", The Autumn Stone, and breakup (1968–69) ====
The final official single during the band's career was folksy sounding "The Universal", released in the summer of 1968. The song was recorded by adding studio overdubs to a basic track that Marriott had cut live in his back garden in Essex with an acoustic guitar. Taped on a home cassette recorder, Marriott's recording included his dogs' barking in the background. The single's comparative lack of success in the charts (No. 16 on the UK chart) disappointed Marriott, who then stopped writing music.

Marriott officially quit the band at the end of 1968, walking off stage during a live New Year's Eve gig yelling "I quit". Citing frustration at their failure to break out of their pop image and their inability to reproduce the more sophisticated material properly on stage, Marriott was already looking ahead to a new band, Humble Pie, with Peter Frampton. On the subject of the group's breakup, Kenney Jones, in an interview with John Hellier (2001), said:

I wish we had been a little bit more grown up at the time. If we had have [sic] played Ogdens' live it would have boosted our confidence so much. We were labelled as a pop band, which definitely got up Steve's nose more than we realised. I wish we had been more like The Who in the fact that when they have problems they stick together until they've overcome them. Steve just thought well how do we top Ogdens' and he was off. Ogdens' was a masterpiece if we had played it live we would have gone to even greater things. I reckon we were on the verge of crossing the great divide and becoming a heavier band.

After fulfilling outstanding live performance commitments, including a European tour in January, the Small Faces' dissolution was formally announced in March 1969, and Marriott and Frampton's plans to form a new group together were unveiled (although the band were already formed and had been rehearsing together since January).

A posthumous double compilation album, The Autumn Stone, was released later in 1969, mixing together the band's hit singles, key album tracks, previously unreleased live concert recordings, and a number of previously unreleased studio tracks recorded for their intended fourth studio album, 1862, including the classic Swinging Sixties instrumental "Wide Eyed Girl on the Wall" and "Donkey Rides, A Penny, A Glass", co-written by Ian McLagan. A final single, "Afterglow (Of Your Love)", taken from Ogdens' Nut Gone Flake, was released in 1969 after the band had ceased to exist and reached No. 36 in the UK Singles Charts.

=== Hiatus: 1969–75 ===
==== Faces (1969–75) ====
After the Small Faces split, Lane, Jones and McLagan joined forces with two former members of the Jeff Beck Group, singer Rod Stewart and guitarist Ronnie Wood, along with Art Wood and Kim Gardner, to form Quiet Melon. Four singles were recorded before Art Wood and Gardner departed, and the remaining members changed the band's name to the Faces. However, hoping to capitalize on the Small Faces' earlier success, record company executives wanted the band to keep their old name. The band objected, arguing the personnel changes resulted in a group altogether different from the Small Faces.

As a compromise, the new line-up's first album, 1970's First Step, was credited to the Faces in the UK and the Small Faces in the US. The album was only a mild commercial success, and the record companies perceived no further need to market this new line-up as the Small Faces. Accordingly, all subsequent albums by this incarnation of the band appeared under the new name the Faces on both sides of the Atlantic. However, all North American LP, cassette and CD reissues of First Step still credit the band as the Small Faces. The Faces eventually achieved major commercial success beginning with their third album, A Nod Is As Good As a Wink... to a Blind Horse, in 1971.

Jones and McLagan stayed with the Faces until their breakup in 1975. Lane exited the Faces slightly earlier, in 1973. With his backing band, Slim Chance, Lane then released several singles and albums from 1973 to 1976, including the 1974 UK hit "How Come".

==== Humble Pie (1969–75) ====
Marriott's first post-Small Faces venture was with the rock group Humble Pie, formed with the former Herd member Peter Frampton. Initially, the group was a huge hit in the US and the UK, but an eventual decline in chart success led to their breakup in 1975. Marriott then released a solo album, Marriott, in 1976.

=== Reunion: 1975–78 ===
Following the breakup of the Faces in 1975, the classic Small Faces line-up of Marriott, Lane, Jones and McLagan reformed briefly to film a video miming to the reissued "Itchycoo Park", which hit the charts again. The group tried recording together again but Lane left after the first rehearsal due to an argument. Unknown to the others, he was just beginning to show the symptoms of multiple sclerosis, and his behaviour was misinterpreted by Marriott and the others as a drunken tantrum.

Nevertheless, McLagan, Jones and Marriott decided to stay together as the Small Faces, recruiting former Roxy Music bassist Rick Wills to take Lane's place. This iteration of the Small Faces recorded two albums, Playmates (1977) and 78 in the Shade (1978), both released on Atlantic Records. The second album saw the addition of former Wings guitarist Jimmy McCulloch. When McCulloch phoned Paul McCartney, who had found him increasingly difficult to work with, to announce he was joining Marriott, McCartney reportedly said "I was a little put out at first, but, well, what can you say to that?"

The reunion albums were both critical and commercial failures. The Small Faces broke up again in 1978.

=== Post-reunion activity: 1979–present ===
Kenney Jones became the drummer of the Who after Keith Moon's death in 1978 and continued to work with the Who through the late 1980s. His most recent work includes a band he formed and named the Jones Gang.

Ian McLagan went on to perform with artists such as Bonnie Raitt, Bob Dylan (the 1984 European tour), the Rolling Stones, David Lindley and his band El Rayo-X among others, and more recently Billy Bragg. In 1998 he published his autobiography, All the Rage. He lived in a small town of Manor outside Austin, Texas, and was bandleader to his own "Bump Band". He died from a stroke on 3 December 2014.

Steve Marriott recorded with a revived line-up of Humble Pie from 1979 to 1981. During their tour of Australia in 1982 this version of Humble Pie was sometimes billed as Small Faces in order to sell more tickets. Along with Ronnie Lane, he formed a new band called the Majik Mijits in 1981, but this band's lone album, Together Again: The Lost Majik Mijits Recordings, was not issued until 2000. Later in the 1980s, Marriott went solo, playing nearly 200 concerts a year. On 20 April 1991, Marriott died in his sleep when a fire, caused by a cigarette, swept through his home in Essex, England. His death came just a few days after he had begun work on a new album in the United States with his former Humble Pie bandmate, Peter Frampton.

Ronnie Lane's recording career was curtailed by the effects of multiple sclerosis, though he issued collaborative albums with Pete Townshend and Ronnie Wood in the late 1970s. He moved to the United States and continued to perform live into the early 1990s. Lane died at his home in Trinidad, Colorado, on 4 June 1997, after battling multiple sclerosis for nearly 20 years.

Rick Wills of the reunited Small Faces played on David Gilmour's 1978 album, David Gilmour, then joined Foreigner later that year. He stayed with Foreigner for 14 years, until 1992. Subsequently, Wills was a member of Bad Company from 1992 to 1998 and again, briefly in 2001. Currently, he lives in Cambridge, England, and works with Kenney Jones in the Jones Gang.

Jimmy McCulloch's stint with the Small Faces only lasted for a few months in late 1977. Shortly after leaving, he started a band called Wild Horses with Brian Robertson, Jimmy Bain and Kenney Jones. He and Jones both left the band before they issued any recordings. McCulloch then became a member of the Dukes, who issued one album in 1979. That same year, McCulloch died at the age of twenty-six from a heroin overdose at his flat in Maida Vale.

== Influence ==
The Small Faces were an early influence on seminal British punk band the Sex Pistols, who regularly covered them in live shows. Johnny Rotten changed lyrics like "I want you to know that I love you baby, want you to know that I care" in "Whatcha Gonna Do About It" to "I want you to know that I hate you baby, want you to know I don't care".

The Small Faces and other 1960s mod bands resurged in interest with the mod revival of the late-1970s, led by the Jam. Paul Weller of the Jam said: "The Small Faces are a massive influence on me. It's everything for me: they looked great, their music was great, their attitude was great. It was the most complete band for me."

The Small Faces were one of the 1960s British pop groups that highly influenced the Britpop movement of the 1990s; Professors Andy Bennett and Jon Stratton place them among the Beatles and the Kinks in this regard.

== Honours and awards ==
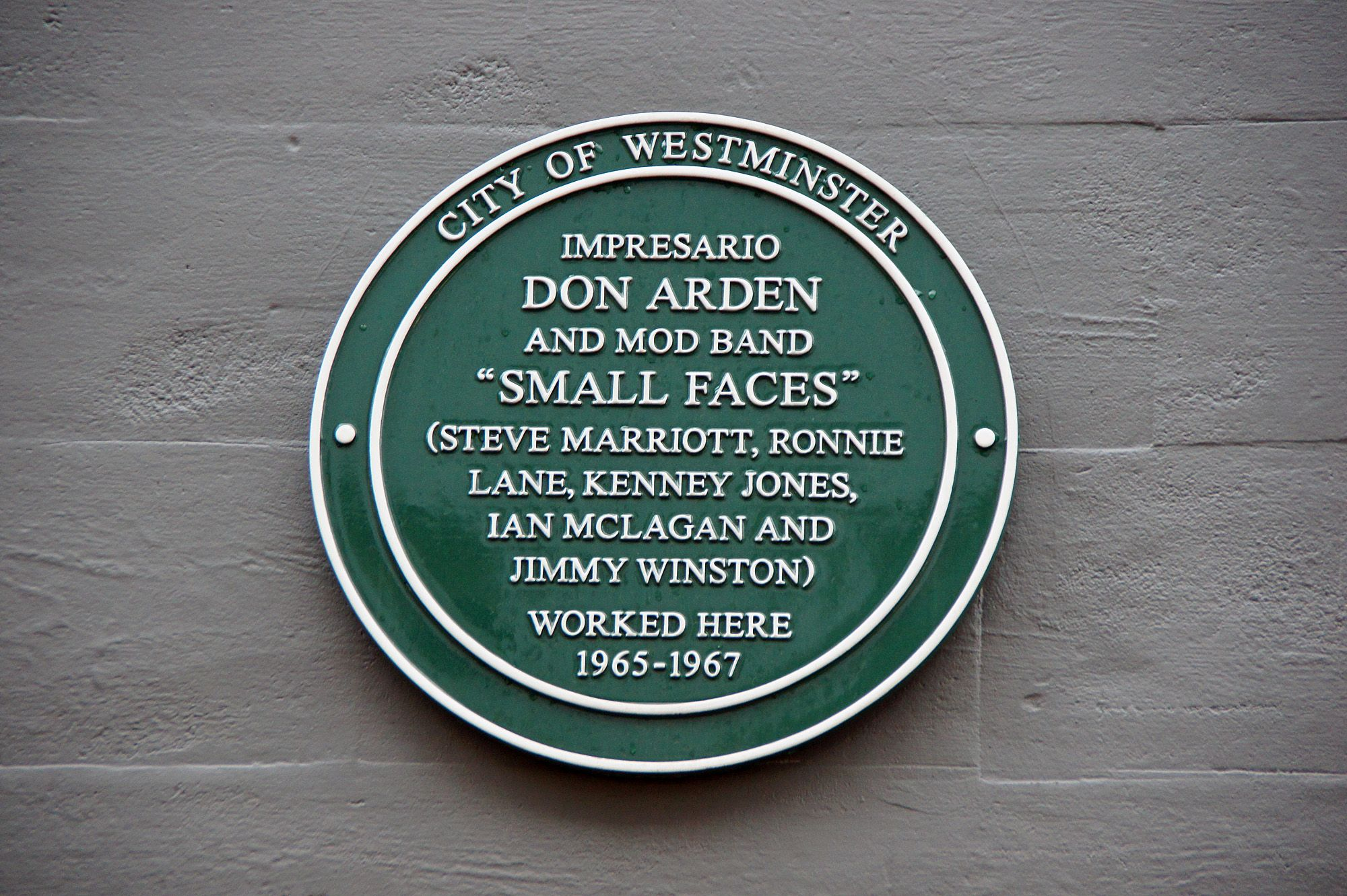
Small Faces plaque

In 1996, the Small Faces were awarded the Ivor Novello Outstanding Contribution to British Music "Lifetime Achievement" award.

On 4 September 2007, a Small Faces and Don Arden commemorative plaque, issued by the London Borough of Westminster, was unveiled in their memory in Carnaby Street. Kenney Jones, who attended the ceremony, said in a BBC television interview, "To honour Small Faces after all these years is a terrific achievement. I only wish that Steve Marriott, Ronnie Lane and the late Don Arden were here to enjoy this moment with me."

On 7 December 2011, the Small Faces and the Faces were announced as 2012 inductees into the Rock and Roll Hall of Fame. The induction ceremony was held on 14 April 2012.

At least one tribute band exists, the Small Fakers, who have been approved by Jones and Winston as well as family members of those involved with the band.

== Band members ==
Classic line-up:

- Steve Marriott – vocals, guitar, harmonica, keyboards (1965–1968, 1975–1978; died 1991)
- Ronnie Lane – bass guitar, vocals, guitar (1965–1969, 1975; died 1997)
- Ian McLagan – keyboards, vocals, guitar, bass (1965–1969, 1975–1978; died 2014)
- Kenney Jones – drums, percussion, vocals (1965–1969, 1975–1978)

== Discography ==
Studio albums

- Small Faces (1966)
- Small Faces (1967)
- There Are But Four Small Faces (US only, 1968)
- Ogdens' Nut Gone Flake (1968)
- Playmates (1977)
- 78 in the Shade (1978)
