= Steve Marriott =

English guitarist and singer (1947–1991)

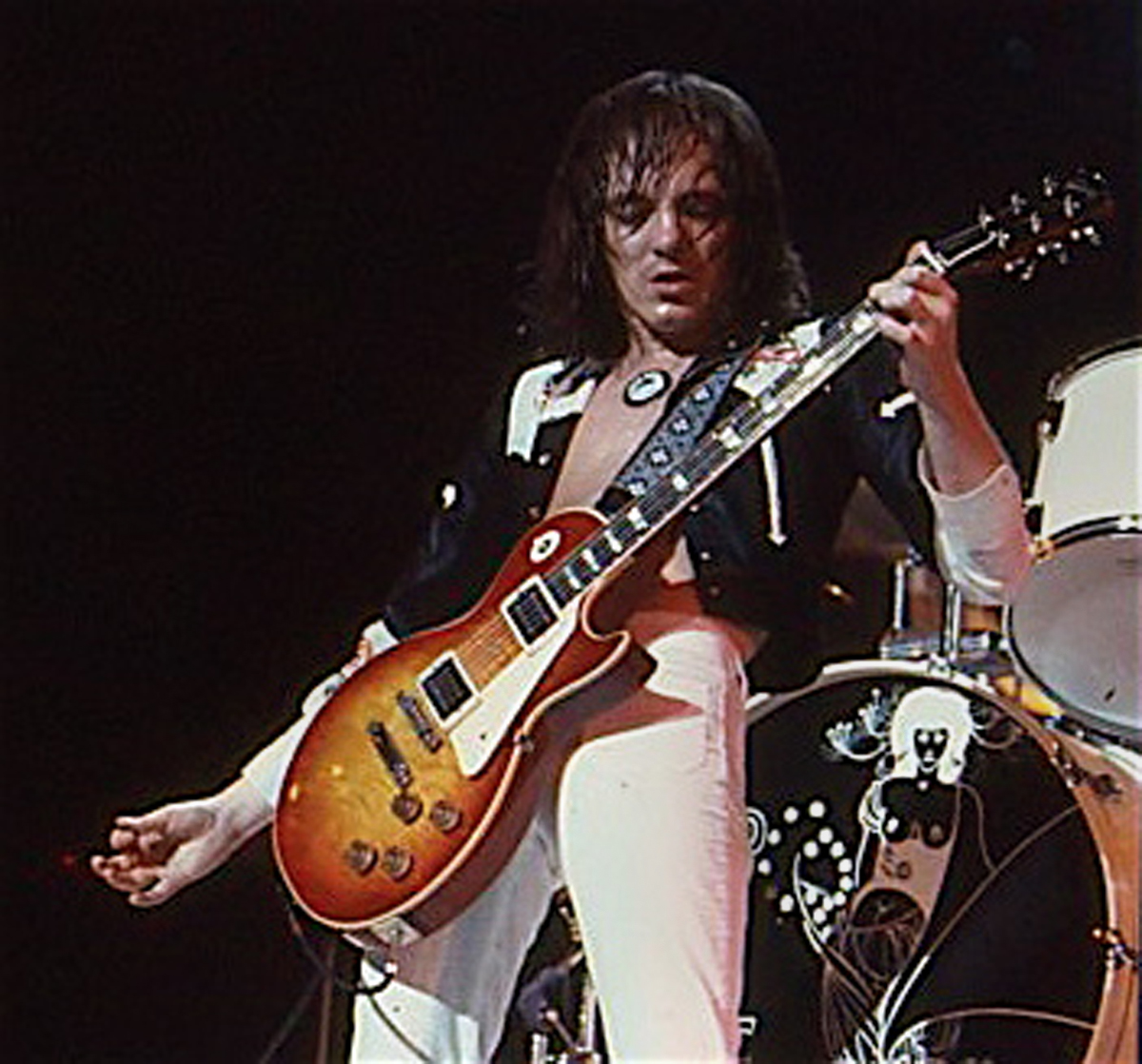
- Marriott performing with Humble Pie, c. 1973

Background information
- Born: Stephen Peter Marriott; 30 January 1947; Plashet, Essex, England
- Died: 20 April 1991 (aged 44) Arkesden, Essex, England
- Genres: Rock; rhythm and blues; blues rock; hard rock
- Occupations: Musician; actor
- Instruments: Vocals; guitar; keyboards
- Years active: 1959–1991
- Labels: Decca; Immediate; A&M; Atco
- Formerly of: Small Faces; Humble Pie
- Website: stevemarriott.co.uk

Stephen Peter Marriott (30 January 1947 – 20 April 1991) was an English musician, guitarist, singer, songwriter, and actor. He was a student at the Italia Conti Academy of Theatre Arts in London and appeared in the West End, before taking a role in music. He co-founded and played in the rock bands Small Faces and Humble Pie, in a career spanning over 20 years. Marriott was inducted posthumously into the Rock and Roll Hall of Fame in 2012 as a member of Small Faces.

In Britain, Marriott became a popular, often-photographed mod style icon. Marriott was influenced by musicians such as Miles Davis, Buddy Holly, Booker T. & the M.G.'s, Ray Charles, Otis Redding, Muddy Waters and Bobby Bland. In his later life, Marriott distanced himself from the mainstream music industry and turned away from major record labels, remaining in relative obscurity. He returned to his musical roots, playing in local pubs and clubs around London and Essex.

Marriott died on 20 April 1991 when a fire, which was thought to have been caused by a cigarette, swept through his 16th-century home in Arkesden, Essex. He was 44. In 1996 he received an Ivor Novello Award for his "Outstanding Contribution to British Music", and was listed in Mojo as one of the top 100 greatest singers of all time.

== Early life ==
Steve Marriott was born on 30 January 1947 at East Ham Memorial Hospital, Plashet, East Ham, (London, E7), England to parents Kay and Bill Marriott who lived at Strone Road, Manor Park. Born three weeks premature and weighing just 4 lb 4 oz (1.9 kg), he developed jaundice and was kept in hospital four weeks before being well enough to go home. Marriott came from a working-class background and attended Monega Junior School. His father Bill worked as a printer and later owned a jellied eels stall, called 'Bill's Eels', outside the Ruskin Arms hotel. For a short time he also sold pie and mash.

Kay worked at the Tate & Lyle factory in Silvertown. Bill was an accomplished pub pianist. Bill bought Marriott a ukulele and harmonica which Marriott taught himself to play. Marriott showed an early interest in singing and performing, busking at local bus-stops for extra pocket money and winning talent contests during the family's annual holiday to Jaywick Holiday camp near Clacton-on-Sea.

In 1959, at the age of twelve, Marriott formed his first band with school friends Nigel Chapin and Robin Andrews. They were called 'The Wheels', later the 'Coronation Kids', and finally 'Mississippi Five'. They later added Simon Simkins and Vic Dixon to their line-up. From a young age, Marriott was a huge fan of American singer Buddy Holly and would mimic his hero by wearing large-rimmed spectacles with the lenses removed. He wrote his first song, called "Shelia My Dear", after his aunt Shelia to whom he was close. Those who heard the song said it was played at a jaunty pace in the style of Buddy Holly and his bandmates also nicknamed him 'Buddy'.

They would play at the local coffee bars in East Ham and perform Saturday morning gigs at the Essoldo Cinema in Manor Park. Marriott was a cheeky, hyperactive child, according to his mother Kay, and well known by his neighbours in Strone Road for playing pranks and practical jokes. While he was a pupil at local Sandringham Secondary Modern School, Marriott was said to be responsible for deliberately starting a fire in a classroom, though he always denied this.

=== Acting career: 1960–1965 ===
In 1960, Bill Marriott spotted an advertisement in a London newspaper for a new Artful Dodger replacement to appear in Lionel Bart's popular musical Oliver!, based on the novel Oliver Twist by Charles Dickens, at the New Theatre (now called the Noël Coward Theatre) in London's West End, and without telling his son, applied for him to audition. At the age of thirteen, Marriott auditioned for the role. He sang two songs, "Who's Sorry Now" by Connie Francis, and "Oh, Boy!" by Buddy Holly. Bart was impressed with Marriott's vocal abilities and hired him. Marriott stayed with the show for twelve months, playing various boys' roles during that time, for which he was paid £8 a week. Marriott was also chosen to provide lead vocals for the Artful Dodger songs "Consider Yourself", "Be Back Soon", and "I'd Do Anything", which appear on the official album to the stage show, released by World Record Club and recorded at the famous Abbey Road Studios. In 1961 the Marriott family moved from Strone Road to a new council flat in Daines Close, Manor Park.

Following Marriott's successful acting debut in Oliver!, his family encouraged him to pursue an acting career. In 1961 he auditioned and was accepted as a student at the Italia Conti Academy of Theatre Arts in London. Because his family were unable to afford the private school fees, it was mutually agreed the fees would be deducted from acting work the school found him. After Marriott's enrolment at the Italia Conti Academy, he quickly gained acting roles, working consistently in film, television and radio, often typecast as the energetic Cockney child. In 1963, he appeared in Heavens Above! (1963), acting alongside Peter Sellers. Marriott utilised his passion for music and starred in Live it Up! (1963) as a drummer named Ricky and its follow-up Be My Guest (1965). Soon he lost interest in acting and turned his attention back to his first love, which was music. His parents were devastated and his decision to give up acting caused a family rift. As a result, he left the family home for a short period to stay with friends.

=== Early music career: 1963–1964 ===
In 1963, Marriott wrote "Imaginary Love" and touted it around the big record labels in London. On the strength of "Imaginary Love", Marriott secured a Decca Records deal as a solo artist with Dick Reagan (also an agent for Cliff Richard). Marriott's first single was a song written by Kenny Lynch, "Give Her My Regards", with Marriott's self-penned song as the B-side. The single was released in July 1963 and was commercially unsuccessful. In the same year Marriott formed The Frantiks, who recorded a cover version of Cliff Richard's song "Move It" with ex-Shadows drummer Tony Meehan, who was brought in to help with production.

Despite the single being hawked around the major record companies, no one was interested and the song was never released. The band then changed their name to The Moments, or Marriott and his Moments. They played support for artists such as The Nashville Teens, The Animals, Georgie Fame and John Mayall, playing venues such as the 100 Club in Soho, London, and the Crawdaddy Club in Richmond. The Moments gained a loyal following, and for a short time had their own fanzine, Beat '64, started by Stuart Tuck and dedicated to 'Steve Marriott's Moments'.

They are noted as performing a total of 80 gigs in 1964. The group was asked to record a single for the American market, a cover version of The Kinks' UK hit song "You Really Got Me", released on the World Artists record label (1964). When their version of "You Really Got Me" failed to get attention, Marriott was dropped from the band, with members claiming he was too young to be a lead singer. According to Don Craine, frontman of London R&B band The Downliners Sect, Marriott applied to join the band as a replacement harmonica player. Craine did not invite him to audition because he knew Marriott wanted to be lead vocalist.

Between leaving the Moments and joining The Small Faces, Steve Marriott joined The Checkpoints. Chris Clements:

"He actually approached us (The Checkpoints) and said he needed to fulfill some gigs that were pending. This was in 1965, he was with us for a couple of months. We rehearsed at The Kentish Drovers in the Old Kent Road in South London. He got us to learn James Brown numbers, which at the time we weren't very up in. One particular memory sticks in my mind. When we rehearsed with him, he almost spoke the words of the song, rather than sang the words. He was listening to us, making sure we got the backing right, so he didn't put himself out vocally. But when we did the first gig with him, out came this fantastic soul voice, we all looked at each other, and our mouths fell open! When doing the gigs, we would pick him up outside the Brewery in Romford road Essex. He always had a small case with his harmonicas in. His harmonica playing was excellent. Our transport at that time was a converted ambulance, and Steve would always sit up front with the owner driver, (a man in his early 50s) rather than sit in the back talking to us. He seemed to me to be a bit of a loner. Even when I had a conversation with him, he always seemed to be looking past me, as though in a hurry to be somewhere else. He was quite a heavy smoker as I recall. We did various venues in Essex, around the Basildon area. He had no guitar, he would use our lead guitarist's red Fender Strat. Steve would put many guitar breaks in the James Brown songs. So we would all huddle around our drummer Gary Hyde who would watch Steve. When Gary stopped, we stopped, when Gary started, we started, so by using those tactics the gigs went well. We had photos taken at the various venues at that time, I wish someone would dig them out from wherever, I would love to see them."

== Career ==
=== Small Faces: 1965–1969 ===
On 28 July 1964, Marriott first saw his future Small Faces partners, Ronnie Lane and 16-year-old drummer Kenney Jones. They were all performing at the Albion in Rainham, with their bands. Lane and Marriott met again by chance in the J60 Music Bar, a music shop in High Street North, Manor Park, where Marriott was working after his recent departure from the Moments. Lane came in looking to purchase a bass guitar, and afterwards was invited to Marriott's home to listen to his extensive collection of rare American R&B import records. With their shared love of R&B the trio were soon firm friends.

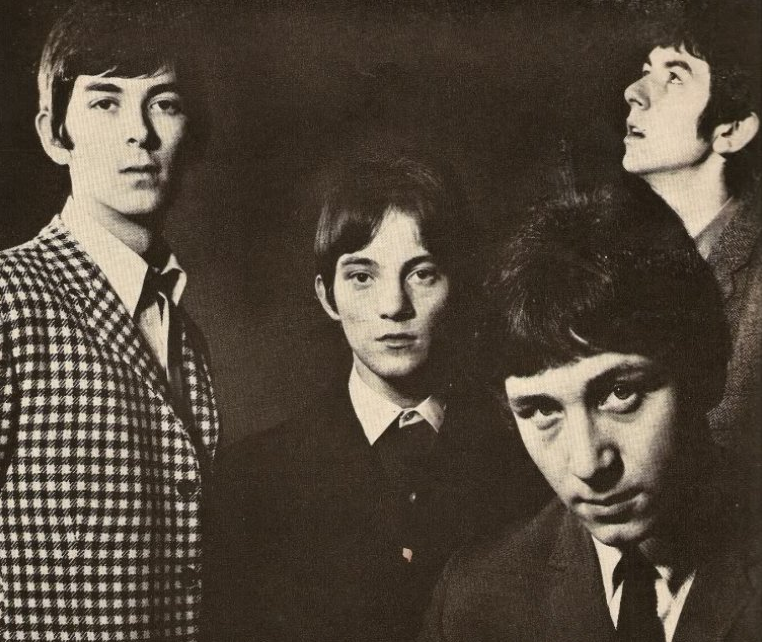
Marriott (centre) with the Small Faces in 1966

Marriott was invited by Lane and Jones to perform with "the Outcasts" (previously called "the Pioneers") at the band's regular gig the Earl of Derby in Bermondsey. The trio each ended up completely drunk and Marriott enthusiastically destroyed the piano he was playing, much to the amusement of Lane and Jones. The landlord sacked them and the band was finished.

According to David Bowie on a 1999 episode of VH1 Storytellers, in 1964 he and his good friend Marriott planned to form an R&B duo called "David and Goliath". Instead, Marriott, Lane and Jones decided to form their own band, with Marriott bringing along his acquaintance, Jimmy Winston (Winston was later replaced by Ian McLagan). Marriott's friend Annabel, an ex-student from the Italia Conti, came up with the band's distinctive name after commenting that they all had "small faces"; the name stuck in part because they were all (apart from Winston) small (none being over 5 ft 6 in or 1.68 m tall), and the term "face" in English mod culture was the name given to a well-known and respected mod. Small Faces were signed to Don Arden within six weeks of forming and quickly became a successful mod influenced band highly regarded by the youth cult's followers when their debut single "Whatcha Gonna Do About It" hit the UK singles chart.

Robert Plant was a fan of Small Faces and a regular at their early gigs where he also ran small errands for them. Led Zeppelin's song "Whole Lotta Love" is a direct take of Marriott's version of the classic song "You Need Lovin'", originally written by Willie Dixon and recorded by American blues singer Muddy Waters. Small Faces would regularly perform "You Need Lovin'" in their live set and the song also appears on their debut album Small Faces, released by Decca in May 1966.

"It was fantastic, I loved it, Muddy Waters recorded it but I couldn't sing like Muddy Waters so it wasn't that much of a nick. I was a high range and Muddy was a low range so I had to figure out how to sing it. So I did and that was our opening number for all the years we were together. Every time we were on stage that was our opening number, unless we had a short set. That's where Jimmy Page and Robert Plant heard it. Robert Plant used to follow us around. He was like a fan." – Steve Marriott

Marriott bore no animosity toward Plant. He is quoted as shouting "Go on my son!" and wishing him luck when he first heard Plant's version on the radio. Arden paid the band a wage of £20 a week each, along with accounts in clothes shops in Carnaby Street. On Boxing Day 1965, Arden arranged for them to move into a rented house, 22 Westmoreland Terrace, Pimlico. In his autobiography, McLagan describes the house as "party central", a place where the likes of Marianne Faithfull, Brian Epstein, Pete Townshend and other celebrities would hang out. Marriott was just 18 years old.

In 1967, after a dispute over unpaid royalties, relations between the Small Faces and Don Arden broke down and Arden sold them on to Andrew Loog Oldham, who owned the Immediate Records label. The band were much happier at Immediate, spending more time in the recording studio and far less time playing live, but they lost the dynamic live sound that had made them famous.

Marriott wrote or co-wrote most of Small Faces' hit singles. In an interview in 1984, Marriott was asked what his best Small Faces songs were: "I think 'All or Nothing', that I wrote, takes a lot of beating. To me, if there's a song that typifies that era, then that might be it. Words regardless, cos it's only a silly love song, but the actual feel and arrangement of the thing, and maybe 'Tin Soldier'". In 1967, Marriott wrote the evocative rock-ballad "Tin Soldier" to woo model Jenny Rylance. They first met in 1966 and Marriott was immediately smitten, but Rylance was dating up-and-coming singer Rod Stewart and so the two became friends. She later broke up with Stewart and had a brief romantic liaison with Marriott, but much to his disappointment ended it to go back to Stewart. Rylance and Stewart later split for good after a rocky four-year relationship; when Marriott found out he pursued her relentlessly, leading him to write "Tin Soldier". The song was a hit for the band in 1967 and for Marriott a personal triumph. He and Rylance were married at Kensington Register Office, London, on 29 May 1968.

In 1968, Marriott moved into Beehive Cottage with his wife Rylance in Moreton, Essex, a property he had bought jointly with Ronnie Lane and wife Susan and where he established his "Clear Sounds" music studio.

After the success of the group's number one hit concept album Ogdens' Nut Gone Flake Marriott was keen for the group to evolve and wanted to bring in ex-Herd frontman Peter Frampton, but McLagan, Jones and Lane refused. Marriott started to feel the band had reached the end creatively and began to spend more time with Frampton and Greg Ridley. After rumours in the press about the band splitting up, which were always officially denied, Marriott quit the group, storming off stage during a disastrous live performance at Alexandra Palace on New Year's Eve, 1968. In a 1984 interview with NME reporter Paolo Hewitt on the subject of leaving the band, Marriott said "You grow apart for Christsakes. You're talking about people living together from the ages of seventeen to twenty-two and that's a growing up part of your life and we got to hate each other, no doubt about it. We didn't speak to each other for fucking years. Maybe ten years.

Frampton has said that after Marriott's departure from the Small Faces, the remaining members, Lane, McLagan and Jones, turned up at his home and offered him Marriott's role in the band: "The following day after the Alexandra Palace gig (where Steve walked off), I was back home and I got a call from Ronnie Lane who said, "Me, Kenney and Mac would like to come round and see you." I thought, 'Hello, what's all this about?' Anyway, they all came round to my horrible little flat in Earls Court and asked me to join the Small Faces. All I could say was it's a bit late now. Why couldn't you have asked me while we were in Paris? We'd all be in the same band together and Steve wouldn't have left." Ian McLagan vehemently denied this story.

=== Humble Pie: 1969–1975 ===
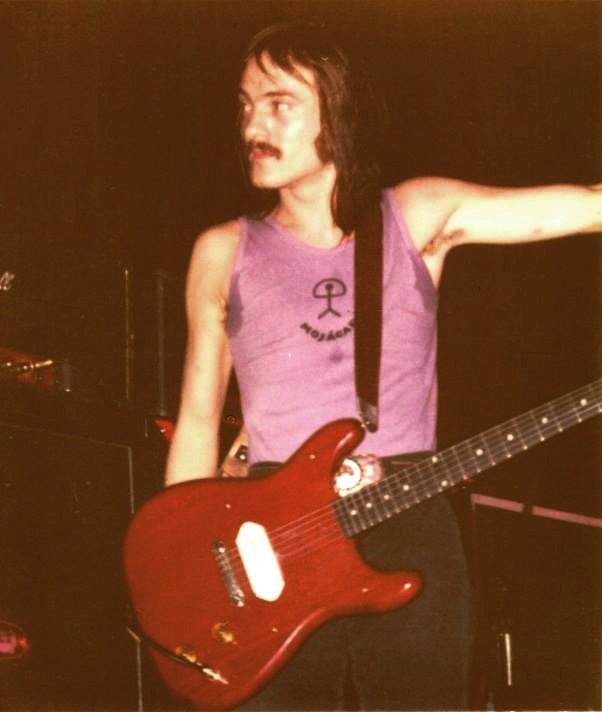
Marriott with Humble Pie during a 1972 performance

Shortly after leaving Small Faces in 1969, Marriott joined the newly formed rock band Humble Pie with Peter Frampton, drummer Jerry Shirley and bassist Greg Ridley. In the early years, Humble Pie allowed Marriott the artistic freedom he craved but was denied in Small Faces due, in part, to commercial pressures and individual differences. After extensive secret rehearsals at his Clear Sounds home recording studio, the band released on Immediate their debut album As Safe As Yesterday Is, closely followed by the Marriott-penned debut single "Natural Born Bugie" (an intentional misspelling of "boogie"), which peaked at No. 4 in the UK Singles Chart in the summer of 1969. Humble Pie almost disbanded after their first American tour when they returned to Britain and discovered that Immediate had gone into liquidation. They transferred to A&M Records and focused all their attention on the lucrative US market. Their new manager, Dee Anthony, had the band scrap its 'unplugged' set and crank the volume up.

Humble Pie toured constantly over the next three years, completing nineteen tours in the US alone. The band's next album releases, Humble Pie and Rock On, benefitted from their touring. Their live album Performance Rockin' the Fillmore (1971) became the band's most successful release to date. During these recordings, Marriott's strong vocal performances became the focal point of the band. Dee Anthony pushed Marriott to take more of the on-stage spotlight, something he had, up to then, been sharing with Frampton and Ridley. Marriott's new prominence is said to have resulted in Frampton's decision to leave the band. (Frampton was replaced by Clem Clempson.)

Some close to Marriott, such as his wife and even Marriott himself, would say that his personality changed for the worse when he toured America. He had regularly taken amphetamines (speed) and smoked cannabis in his days in the Moments and Small Faces, and in the latter half of the 1960s he also tried LSD. But by the time Humble Pie began to tour America regularly in the early 1970s, Marriott allegedly developed a destructive cocaine and alcohol addiction, which is thought to have been the cause of his marriage break-ups and to have contributed to his premature death in a house fire.

"He (Steve) became another person to cope with the pressures, he would say things like, "Please tell me that you'll leave me if I go on tour again because if you say that I'll have justification not to go, if I go and have to be that other person again I'll just go mad." This would be said in a moment of truth but the next day had changed his mind and he'd be up and off.... He was married to his music and I didn't mind that especially in the early years when he would play me new songs on an acoustic guitar but what didn't make me happy was when he was in the home studio, out of his brain, trying to come up with the next album because he was being pressurised into it. He would just disappear into the studio for three or four days at a time. He never slept and there would be all sorts of strange people in there with him. It was a crazy business and even the nicest people get mixed up. All sorts of chemicals were presented to him and he became addicted to them in the end. It was drugs that destroyed our relationship. Before the home studio was built Beehive Cottage was our sanctuary, afterwards it just became his workplace." – Jenny Rylance

Rylance finally left Marriott in 1973. She said: "The drugs and the drink I would tolerate no more. It broke my heart to leave Steve but it had to be done, I was ultimately the stronger". Due to the break-up of his marriage and growing drug use, some band members said that Marriott at times became domineering, aggressive and intolerable to work with. Humble Pie disbanded in 1975, citing musical differences as the reason for the split. Financial mismanagement and widespread substance abuse within the band also played a part. In an interview in 2000 with John Hellier, Jerry Shirley said:

"We were all doing too many drugs, we'd lost sight of our business arrangements and no-one within the band had any control over money matters. But the main reason was that we were making bad records, it all came to a head in early 1975. The rot had set in so deep it was inevitable." – Jerry Shirley (Humble Pie).

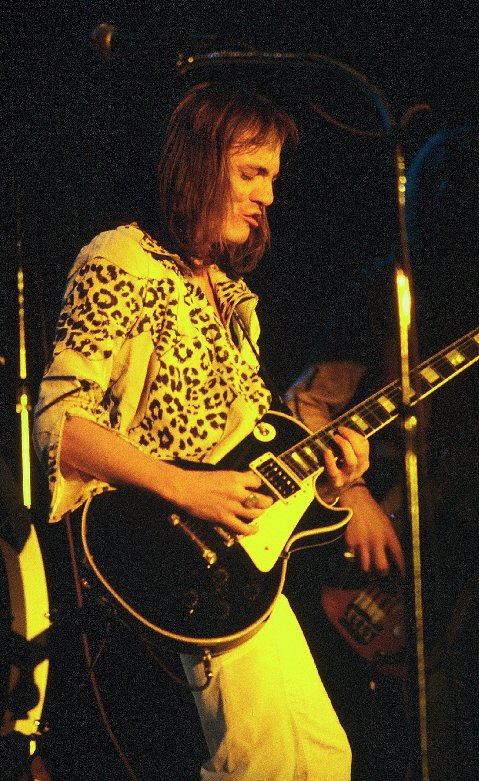
Marriott with Humble Pie in 1973

Marriott always believed Dee Anthony had syphoned off band earnings to promote his new project, Frampton and his album Frampton Comes Alive! After Marriott's death, second wife Pam Stephens claimed in an interview that while they were making the Marriott solo album they were warned off accusing Anthony of any financial misdealings and received threatening phone calls. Anthony was alleged to have links with the Genovese crime family (among others). She also claimed that after Marriott confronted Anthony about the missing money, she and Marriott were summoned to a meeting at the Ravenite Social Club on Mulberry Street in New York's Little Italy district. Among those present were John Gotti, Frank Locascio and Paul Castellano, all members of the Gambino crime family. Marriott was informed that he would not be getting any money and was warned to drop the matter. Marriott took the threats seriously.

Jerry Shirley, however, denies some of the rumours that Anthony was Mafia-related and has dismissed them as "bollocks" and "romanticised exaggeration". He has acknowledged Anthony's connections and a lot of the stories being folklore.

=== Solo career ===
Marriott released his first solo album, Marriott, in 1976 and moved back to Britain. Stephens gave birth to their first child Toby on 20 February 1976, and they were married on 23 March 1977, at Chelsea Register Office in London. The money from Humble Pie's farewell tour soon ran out, and Marriott was reduced to stealing vegetables from a field next to his home. He went on to form the Steve Marriott Allstars with ex-Pie bassist Greg Ridley, drummer Ian Wallace and ex-Heavy Metal Kids' guitarist Mickey Finn, and found a new manager, Laurie O'Leary. In the 1980s O'Leary asked Marriott to meet a friend of his, the infamous Ronnie Kray, who was incarcerated in Broadmoor Hospital for the murder of George Cornell. Marriott gave him a signed photo.

After the departure of Mick Taylor in 1975 from the Rolling Stones, Marriott was considered as his replacement; however, Mick Jagger allegedly blocked the move after Marriott upstaged him during the audition. According to Ronnie Wood in his autobiography Ronnie, Marriott was Richards' first choice to replace Taylor.

"Steve told me, 'I was good and stood at the back for a while but then Keith [Richards] would hit this lick and I just couldn't keep my mouth shut.' Keith wanted him in but there was no way that once Steve opened his mouth Mick would have him in the band. He knew Steve would never stay in the background. They were the one band in the world that Steve would have loved to have been in. He just wanted to work with Keith." – Pam Marriott

=== Small Faces reformed: 1976–1978 ===
In 1976 a court ruled that Arden still owed the Small Faces £12,000 in unpaid royalties. He agreed to pay in monthly instalments, but disappeared after making just one payment.

Due to the success of re-released singles "Itchycoo Park" and "Lazy Sunday" in 1975 and 1976, McLagan, Jones and Marriott were persuaded to re-form Small Faces. Rick Wills took the place of Lane, who pulled out after just two rehearsals. Unknown to the others, Lane was suffering from multiple sclerosis. The band recorded two albums, Playmates (1977) and 78 in the Shade (1978), but the albums were both critical and commercial failures and they disbanded. Marriott did not make any money out of the venture. His earnings were used to extricate him from old management contracts. Due to financial problems, Marriott was forced to sell Beehive Cottage, which had been his home since 1968, and move to a small terraced house in Golders Green, London.

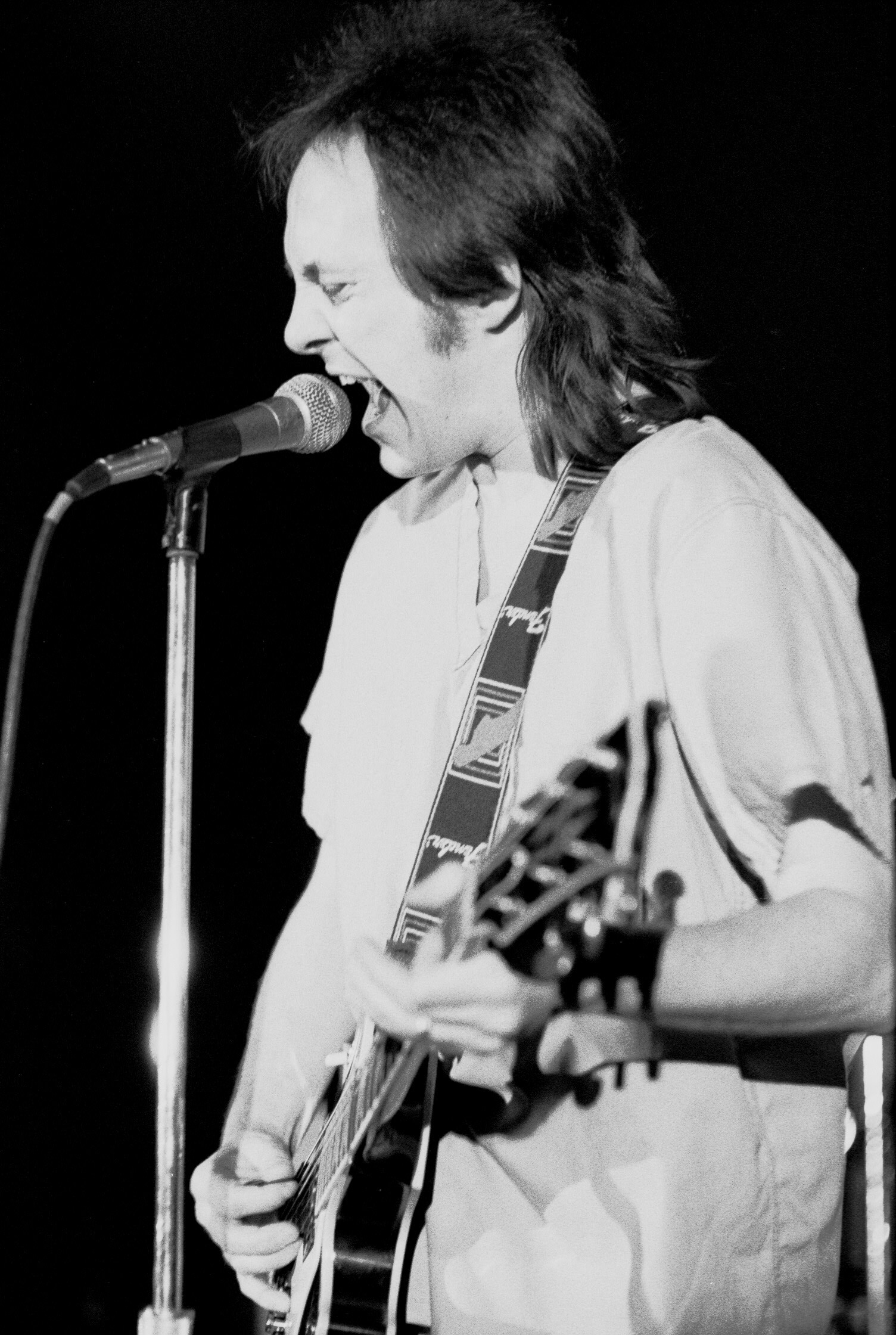
Steve Marriott, 1980

Late in 1978, the Inland Revenue informed Marriott that he still owed £100,000 in back tax from his Humble Pie days; he thought manager Dee Anthony had made all the necessary payments. O'Leary, Marriott's manager, advised him to leave Britain or go to prison. He sold the house in Golders Green and moved to California. Marriott, Pam and son Toby were staying with friends in Santa Cruz and Marriott formed a new band called The Firm, with Jim Leverton and (most notably) former Mountain guitarist Leslie West. But after Leverton had to leave the US due to visa problems, and disputes over potential royalties, the band broke up. Marriott was by now completely broke and forced to collect empty glass bottles to redeem them for small change.

=== Humble Pie reformed: 1980–1981 ===
According to Leslie West, Marriott needed the money and accepted a lucrative offer to reform Humble Pie. In 1980, Marriott contacted Jerry Shirley, who was living in New York City, to discuss a Humble Pie reunion. Shirley agreed and they recorded "Fool for a Pretty Face", which Marriott had written. The new line-up included Anthony "Sooty" Jones, who was a well-respected bassist among American East Coast musicians, as well as vocalist and guitarist Bobby Tench, former member of the Jeff Beck Group. The song proved good enough for them to secure a recording contract with Atco. In the UK their material was released by Jet Records, owned by ex-Small Faces manager Don Arden.

They recorded the heavy rock album On to Victory (1980), followed by Go for the Throat (1981), and both proved reasonably successful. They also toured America as part of the "Rock 'N' Roll Marathon" bill. In the latter half of 1981, Marriott was beset with personal problems. His marriage was almost over and after he broke his wrist in an accident and was hospitalised with a suspected burst ulcer; whilst opening for Judas Priest, the new Humble Pie line-up disintegrated.

=== Majik Mijits: 1981, 2000 ===
During a visit to Britain in 1981, Marriott became eager to see Ronnie Lane. By this time Lane, had begun to use a wheelchair. After an emotional meeting, Marriott suggested they gig together. They got together with Jim Leverton, Mick Weaver, Dave Hynes, Zoot Money and Mel Collins to record an album called Majik Mijits. The album features songs by Lane and Marriott, though none were co-written. Due to Lane's illness, they were unable to tour and promote the album.

"Steve and Ronnie went to America to see Clive Davis of Arista Records. They played him the tape. Clive Davis was tapping his foot and tapping his very expensive pen on his very expensive desk. He said "Yeah, that's great man". Steve said "So you like the tape, Clive". Steve then stopped the tape, ejected it and said "WELL YOU CAN'T FUCKING HAVE IT!" The story that Steve told me was that it would have meant touring and Ronnie just wasn't up to it. It would have meant pretty much carrying him everywhere, no tour, no album. That's why the Mijits never came out at that point in time. It's been gathering dust for ages" – Jim Leverton.

The album was released nineteen years later, in 2000. After the Majik Mijits, Marriott went back to New York playing on the club circuit again.

=== Later years ===
For the next year and a half, Marriott was on the road with Jim Leverton, Goldy McJohn, formerly of Steppenwolf, and Fallon Williams. They played mostly Small Faces and Humble Pie material, touring non-stop for the next 18 months. After the departure of McJohn, the trio changed the band's name to the Three Trojans. Despite attempts at reconciliation, Marriott's marriage finally came to an end when his wife found out that Marriott was expecting a child with Terry Elias, a Canadian girl he had met while they were separated.

Leverton was unable to return to the US in 1983 so he was replaced by Keith Christopher (later a member of Lynyrd Skynyrd). Steve went through several guitar players that year including Tommy Johnson, and Phil "Duck" Dix. The band toured the US extensively as Humble Pie in 1983 playing clubs, festivals, and theaters. The final US show as Humble Pie took place in Marietta, Georgia, on New Year's Eve. In early 1984, Rick Richards (an original member of The Georgia Satellites) replaced Phil Dix on guitar as the band was about to record demos with producer and audio engineer Eddie Offord (known for his work with Yes and Emerson, Lake & Palmer) at his studio in Atlanta. The new lineup only lasted 24 hours and Marriott decided to return to the UK.

=== Packet of Three: 1984–1986 ===
Accepting that his marriage was over, Marriott moved back to the UK. With no home and no money, he stayed in the spare bedroom of his sister Kay's house. Marriott formed Packet of Three, again playing the pub circuit. He insisted on being paid for each gig in cash as the Inland Revenue were still pursuing him for back taxes. In 1984, Aura Records released Packet of Three (1984), it was later reissued as Steve Marriott Live at Dingwalls 6.7.84. Marriott contacted longtime friend Manon Piercey, and they quickly developed a close relationship and rented a house together. Piercey gave birth to daughter Mollie Mae on 3 May 1985. With Piercey's help, Marriott reduced his excessive drink and drug habits. His sister Kay said: "Steve would say, I'm not drinking any more, and he'd stop, six weeks, two months, he was very strong willed; if he wanted to, he could". In 1985, Marriott was still touring with Packet of Three playing Canada, the US and Europe.

During Live Aid in 1985, London-based Phoenix Modernist Society joined mod revival bands such as the Lambrettas and Purple Hearts, with 1960s stars such as Chris Farlowe and PP Arnold and 1980s mod singers Eleanor Rigby and Martin Burton of The Gents. Together they cut a version of "All or Nothing" for Band Aid Trust. Kenny Lynch persuaded Marriott to get involved, and the single was released under the collective name the Spectrum.

In 1985, Marriott ended his relationship with Piercey when he met Toni Poulton at a Packet of Three gig.

Due to his financial situation, Marriott jokingly later renamed the group Steve Marriott and the Official Receivers. In the mid-1980s, Marriott and Poulton moved to a rented cottage in the small village of Arkesden. The 16th century cottage was also used for location shots for the home of the title character in the BBC's long-running television series Lovejoy, starring Ian McShane. Marriott became well known locally, often popping into the pub opposite his home to buy bottles of brandy and borrowing glasses. He once turned up wearing trainers and a dressing gown and became something of an eccentric figure, playing pranks, particularly on the owner of the pub.

=== Disillusionment with music business ===
Due to past experiences, in later years Marriott became wary of success and fame as well as involvement with big record companies, and turned down lucrative concert and recording deals with names such as EMI. Because of this attitude, the band grew resentful, believing that he was holding them back, and Packet of Three was disbanded. For the next year Marriott took time off. By now he was 39 years old. He had health problems, was overweight, and had a scruffy appearance.

Film-maker Paolo Sedazzari recalled, "I remember going to see him in the 1980s, and he was brilliant. Great voice, great guitarist but what I couldn't get over were the dungarees and the mullet haircut. That was really disappointing." According to his wife, Marriott still smoked cannabis and took cocaine, but nothing compared to what he had once consumed. In his later years Marriott liked reading; his favourite authors included Stephen King, Philip K. Dick and anything on Noël Coward, whom Marriott had always admired.

=== The DTs, various projects: 1988–1990 ===
In May 1988, Marriott started rehearsing with a band from Leicestershire, the DTs, though by the time they starting touring they were called Steve Marriott and the DTs. Despite being out of the public gaze, Marriott was still asked to participate in various projects. Andrew Lloyd Webber asked Marriott to record two songs for his musical Evita, though after becoming drunk at the meeting Marriott declined. Film composer Stephen Parsons asked Marriott to sing the title track "Shakin' All Over" for the low budget horror film Gnaw: Food of the Gods II (1989); Marriott agreed, seeing it as easy money. While recording the song, Trax Records asked Marriott to record a solo album. 30 Seconds To Midnite was recorded at Alexandra Palace. Marriott used the money to buy a narrowboat. On 14 July 1989, Marriott and Toni Poulton were married at Epping Register Office. Afterwards, they threw a party at their cottage.

During this period Jim Leverton got in touch and Marriott formed a new group called Steve Marriott's Next Band, with Leverton and ex-members of both the DTs and the Official Receivers. When several members left due to financial disagreements, the band name Packet of Three resurfaced.

=== Frampton: 1990–1991 ===
By 1990, Marriott was playing an average 200 gigs a year, when Frampton flew into Britain and asked Marriott to reform Humble Pie to produce a one-off album and a reunion tour. The payment would be enough to allow Marriott to take things easier. He agreed, and they flew out to Frampton's recording studio in Los Angeles on 27 January 1991. They began writing songs, but the project was never completed, as Marriott had a change of heart and returned home.

Two recorded songs from this final effort, "The Bigger They Come" and "I Won't Let You Down", with Marriott on vocals (and guitar), appeared on Frampton's album Shine On: A Collection. A third song, "Out of the Blue", featuring both Marriott and Frampton, was featured on the first solo recording Frampton made after Marriott's death. A fourth song, "An Itch You Can't Scratch", has been found on many illegal compilations and even on one of two "authorised" British releases. The recording date, and whether Frampton played on it, have never been verified.

== Relationships and family ==
Marriott had liaisons with many women and had four children with four of them, including one of his three wives.

His first wife was model Jenny Rylance (1968–1973). He met American air hostess Pam Stephens in 1975 and their son Toby Marriott was born in 1976. They married after Toby was born. The song "Toe Rag" written 1977 and recorded for the Majik Mijits album in 1981, was about the infant Toby who, aged approximately two years old, guested on the original demo as featured on 2005 compilation Rainy Days. Marriott's third wife was Toni Poulton. They were married from July 1989 until Marriott's death in 1991.

Marriott had three daughters. The first daughter, Lesley, was born to fellow teen Sally Foulger before Marriott became famous. She was originally known as Sarah Lisa Foulger (born 9 June 1966). She was adopted but later found out who her father was and has been accepted by her siblings. The second daughter was Tonya, with Canadian Terri Elias in 1984. The third daughter was Mollie Mae, known as singer Mollie Marriott, who was born in 1985 when Marriott was with his childhood friend Manon Piercey.

== Death ==
On Friday 19 April 1991, Marriott and Poulton flew home from the United States, where Marriott had recorded songs for a future album with Frampton. During the flight, according to Poulton, Marriott was drinking heavily and was in a foul mood, and the two argued constantly. After arriving in the UK, a mutual friend met them and they all went for dinner at one of Marriott's favourite restaurants, The Straw Hat in Sawbridgeworth, where he consumed more alcohol. After dinner, they returned to their friend's house and decided to stay overnight, since it was late, but upstairs in bed, Marriott and Poulton continued to argue. Poulton finally fell asleep and later woke to discover that Marriott had taken a taxi to his home in the nearby village of Arkesden.

At about 6:30 am on 20 April, a passing motorist saw the roof of Marriott's cottage ablaze and called the fire brigade. It was reported that four or five engines were needed to put out the fire. In newspaper interviews, the Assistant Divisional Fire Officer of Essex Fire Brigade, Keith Dunatis, who found Marriott, said:

"It was a tough fight getting upstairs. We searched the bedroom areas and it was very hot, we knew immediately that no-one could have survived the fire. We began to feel around the walls and discovered him lying on the floor between the bed and the wall. I would say he had been in bed and tried to escape. As soon as I saw the body clearly I knew who it was. I used to be a fan, it's difficult to put my feelings into words. The scene was horrific in that corner of the room. I saw him lying there and thought what a pity it all was. I deal with many fires but this one was like walking down memory lane. We managed to salvage all his guitars and musical equipment. I feel a bit upset, all the firemen do. It was like seeing part of our lives gone forever." – (Fire Officer)

It is believed that the most likely cause of the fire was that soon after arriving home, jet-lagged and tired, in the early hours, Marriott had lit a cigarette while in bed and almost immediately fallen into a deep sleep.

Since Marriott was found lying on the floor between the bed and wall, investigators concluded that he tried unsuccessfully to escape after being awakened by the blaze. Disorientated and confused after inhaling large amounts of thick smoke, Marriott had turned left instead of right towards the bedroom door and safety. He had been unable to rectify his mistake before being overcome by smoke. At the inquest, a verdict of accidental death by smoke inhalation was recorded. Marriott's blood was found to contain quantities of Valium (taken earlier for flight nerves), alcohol and cocaine (taken for nerves and/or recreation).

"He (Marriott) was certainly the most talented person I ever worked with. He was like a brother to me and I was devastated when he died. He always lived on the edge and I was always waiting for a 'phone call to say that he had died but I never dreamed it would be under those circumstances. He's never got the credit he deserves. He should be in the Rock & Roll Hall of Fame because he was the greatest white soul singer that England ever produced. I'm certain that if you caught the likes of Rod Stewart and Paul Rodgers in a private moment and asked them who was the main man, they would say Steve Marriott." – Jerry Shirley

The Small Faces song "All or Nothing" was played as the requiem at Marriott's funeral held on 30 April 1991, at the Harlow crematorium. Amongst the mourners, noted attendees included ex-Small Faces drummer Kenney Jones, as well as Peter Frampton, Joe Brown, P. P. Arnold, Terence Stamp, Jerry Shirley and Greg Ridley. Among those who sent wreaths were David Gilmour (of Pink Floyd) and Rod Stewart and his then-wife Rachel Hunter. Nothing was heard from ex-Small Faces members Ian McLagan or Ronnie Lane.

== Legacy ==
To mark the 10th anniversary of Marriott's death, a tribute concert was held at the London Astoria on 20 April 2001. All the songs performed at this concert were from the Small Faces or Humble Pie catalogue. Pre-1980 Humble Pie alumni Peter Frampton, Clem Clempson, Greg Ridley and Jerry Shirley gave a one-off performance. Other guest appearances included two original members of the Small Faces, Kenney Jones and Ian McLagan, along with Paul Weller, Noel Gallagher and Bobby Tench from Marriott's 1980's Humble Pie line-up and John's Children. Other musicians such as Alan White, Gem Archer, Midge Ure, Zak Starkey, Rabbit Bundrick, Steve Ellis and Tony Rivers appeared in band line-ups during the two and half-hour concert, released on DVD as the Stevie Marriott Astoria Memorial concert. The proceeds of the concert were donated to The Small Faces Charitable Trust set up by Kenney Jones in memory of Steve Marriott and Ronnie Lane.

In September 2007, Marriott, along with the other members of the Small Faces and manager Don Arden, were honoured with a plaque unveiled in Carnaby Street, on the site of Don Arden's offices, the spiritual home of the band in the 1960s.

Posthumously, Marriott's songs have been featured in the Grand Theft Auto video game franchise, with "Get Down to It" in Grand Theft Auto: San Andreas, "Cocaine" in Grand Theft Auto IV, "30 Days in the Hole" and "Ogdens' Nut Gone Flake" in Grand Theft Auto V and Grand Theft Auto Online; the latter was featured in Grand Theft Auto V's first trailer in 2011.

In May 2024, Variety reported that Marriott's estate had authorised the release of AI-generated recordings of him by Cleopatra Records. The idea was strongly opposed by Marriott's children, his former bandmates, and other high-profile musicians. His estate responded that "there are no confirmed plans to use [his] voice on AI recordings ... That does not mean a deal will not be done with one of several suitors who have made offers."

== Discography ==
- Steve Marriott discography (solo career)
- Small Faces discography (career and time with Small Faces)
- Humble Pie discography (career and time with Humble Pie)

== Guest appearances ==
- Bill Wyman invited Marriott to play guitar and backing vocals on the recording of Their Satanic Majesties Request album, on the track "In Another Land", in Keith Richards' absence. (1967)
- PP Arnold – Marriott wrote and produced "(If You Think You're) Groovy" (1967) – along with Lane and the other members of Small Faces.
- Joe Brown (1967) – Collaborated on the singer/entertainer's song "Tin Soldier"
- Chris Farlowe's song "My Way of Giving" – contributed guitar and vocals on the single which was produced by Mick Jagger and written by Marriott/Lane. (1967) – Chris Farlowe & The Thunderbirds with Carl Palmer on drums.
- Traffic (1967) – On the Mr. Fantasy album, Marriott is heard talking on the track "Berkshire Poppies"
- Del Shannon – Contributed keyboards on the Home and Away album in sessions recorded by Andrew Loog Oldham (1967)
- Easybeats – Provided vocals on their single "Good Times" from the LP Vigil in 1968.
- The Herd – Produced the UK band's single "Sunshine Cottage" (1968)
- Johnny Hallyday – Rivière... Ouvre Ton Lit album, the Small Faces with Peter Frampton were hired as session musicians in Paris, early 1969. They did renditions of Small Faces songs as well as new material that would become the origins of Humble Pie's As Safe As Yesterday Is (1969) debut album.
- "Seamus" on Pink Floyd's album Meddle – Marriott's dog Seamus, who David Gilmour was dog-sitting at the time, performs lead vocals on the song.
- Mott the Hoople – Provided vocals on "Midnight Lady" (1971)
- B B King in London – Steve as well as Greg Ridley with Alexis Korner played on one song Alexis' Boogie in 1971.
- Alexis Korner – Same as above (1971)
- Accidentally born in New-Orleans from the group Snape, starring Boz Burrell, Mel Collins and Ian Wallace (1972) Steve plays organ on the song Country shoes.
- Donovan – Marriott guested on track "Boy for Every Girl" on the 1973 Essence to Essence album.
- Get off my cloud from Alexis Korner (1974) – Steve & Peter Frampton played on six songs of this album.
- Alexis Korner hired Marriott as a guitar player for his UK and European tours in 1975
- Johnny Thunders – Piano and harmonica on the album So Alone, co-lead vocals on "Daddy Rollin' Stone" (1978)
- Jim Capaldi – Marriott provided guest vocals on the 1984 album One Man Mission on the track "Young Savages". (Marriott and Capaldi were friends from Capaldi's days in the band Traffic).
- Nescafé coffee's new product – Blend 37 TV commercial (1989). Marriott and Clempson were asked to guest, singing Ike and Tina Turner's hit song "Black Coffee" (which also appears on Humble Pie's 1973 album Eat It).
- John Lee (ex the Dingoes) – wrote and recorded with the Australian drummer and songwriter.
- Marge Raymond was hired to sing background vocals by Steve Marriott and appears on the Go for the Throat and On to Victory albums.

== Filmography ==
| Year | Title | Role | Notes | Ref. |
|---|---|---|---|---|
| 1962 | Night Cargoes | Boy | TV film | |
| 1963 | Heavens Above! | Cockney kid | | |
| 1963 | Live It Up! | Drummer Ricky | | |
| 1965 | Be My Guest | Ricky | | |
| 1965 | Dateline Diamonds | Self | Small Faces | |

- Night Cargoes – (1962) Children's adventure film, shot between April and June 1962 in Devon and designed for a very young audience. The film was split into eight, fifteen-minute episodes and shown during Saturday morning picture shows.
- Heavens Above! – (released April 1963) Starring Peter Sellers as a prison chaplain and co-starring Eric Sykes. Marriott plays a street kid. There were reports on set of Sellers and Marriott duetting on banjos between takes.
- Live It Up! – (1963) Starring David Hemmings and Jennifer Moss. Marriott was typecast as the Cockney drummer called "Ricky".
- Be My Guest – (1964) released in 1965 (the follow-up to Live It Up!) again Marriott plays the character "Ricky".
- Dateline Diamonds – (1965) Marriott along with the other members of the Small Faces appear as themselves in the film performing their self-penned second single "I've Got Mine".

=== Television and Radio ===
- Citizen James – (1961) A popular half-hour comedy starring Carry On Films actor Sid James.
- Dixon of Dock Green – (transmitted in 1963) – Marriott appears in an episode entitled "The River People" playing a character called "Clive Dawson"; the episode was written by Ted Willis.
- William the Peacemaker – Marriott's last TV acting role (March 1963). Marriott plays the character of "Bertie Franks".
- Mr Pastry's Progress – (1962) b/w BBC television children's sitcom starring Richard Hearne and Barbara Hicks.
- Radio Luxembourg – Reading out listeners' problem letters for well-known agony aunt Marjorie Proops.
- Mrs Dale's Diary – a popular radio show playing a popstar called 'Art Joyful'.
