= Whatcha Gonna Do About It =

- Belgian picture sleeve

Single by Small Faces
- B-side: "What's a Matter Baby"
- Released: 6 August 1965
- Studio: Pye, London
- Genre: Rock; rhythm and blues
- Length: 1:59
- Label: Decca
- Songwriters: Brian Potter; Ian Samwell
- Producer: Ian Samwell

Small Faces singles chronology
"Whatcha Gonna Do About It" (1965)	"I've Got Mine" (1965)

"Whatcha Gonna Do About It" is the debut single released by the English rock group Small Faces, released in the UK on 6 August 1965. The song peaked at number 14 in the UK singles chart, and stayed on chart for a total of 14 weeks. It reached number 28 in Canada.

== Song profile ==
The songwriting duo of the group Steve Marriott and Ronnie Lane already had the melody for the song, the inspiration coming from Solomon Burke's hit record "Everybody Needs Somebody to Love." However they had no lyrics, so their manager, Don Arden, brought in Ian Samwell and Brian Potter to provide the words for the song. The song entered the UK Singles Chart at number 27 and rose to number 14, just missing the all-important Top Ten. Kenney Jones recalled to Uncut magazine: "We hadn't fully established our own songwriting abilities – our stage show was mainly covers of things like Otis Redding's 'Shake' – and this really suited the power of Steve's voice. The style was very indicative of the time and we loved it."

According to Marriott, the group had by the end of July entered IBC Studios and recorded an earlier version of the song, which he claimed to love. However, this version was abandoned in favor of a newer rendition recorded at Pye Studios. The older version was later issued in 1972 on a French compilation album. The feedback heard throughout the track was Marriott's idea, claimed Jones in an interview with Uncut. "He was pissing about in front of his old Marshall amp and it sounded lovely, so we kept it."

Years later, Arden admitted to spending £12,000 on chart fixing to ensure the band's debut song would be a hit. In an interview, Arden denied it was cheating: "I had a saying, you can't polish a turd. In other words, if the record's no good to begin with, it still won't be any good after you've wasted your time and money getting it played."

It was originally issued on the group's eponymous debut album, and later it was included on their 1967 compilation From the Beginning.

== Personnel ==
Small Faces

- Steve Marriott – lead vocal, lead guitar
- Ronnie Lane – bass guitar, backing vocals
- Jimmy Winston – Hammond organ, rhythm guitar, backing vocals
- Kenny Jones – drums

== Covers ==
- In 1967, Minneapolis, Minnesota based garage band The Litter used the track on the LP Distortions, and as the B-side to their regional hit "Action Woman" (Warick 6712)
- Sex Pistols recorded a cover version of "Whatcha Gonna Do About It", changing the lyrics from "I want you to know that I love you baby" to "I want you to know that I hate you baby." Apart from John Lydon, the Sex Pistols were known to be fans of the Small Faces' music.
- Cock Sparrer and The Templars have also recorded versions of the song.
- In 1978, Scottish band The Jolt released the song on a single and included it on their Polydor debut album (2383 504).
- In 1981, Pretenders released a 7" Flexi-disc (006) for Flexipop magazine, manufactured by Lyntone (LYN 9650). The promotional disc features "Whatcha Gonna Do About It" on the A side and "Stop Your Sobbin'" (The Kinks) on the B side.
- In 2002, the UK TV talent show Stars in Their Eyes grand finals winner Emma 'Dusty Springfield' Wilkinson released a cover version.

== See also ==
- Small Faces discography
