= Don Arden =

English music manager and agent (1926–2007)

- Born: Harry Levy; 4 January 1926; Cheetham, Manchester, England
- Died: 21 July 2007 (aged 81); Los Angeles, California, US
- Resting place: Agecroft Cemetery, Pendlebury, Greater Manchester, England
- Occupations: Businessman; music manager; publicist; agent
- Years active: 1954–1986
- Known for: Founder of Jet Records
- Spouse: Hope Shaw (m. 1950; died 1999)
- Children: 2, including Sharon
- Relatives: Aimee Osbourne (granddaughter); Kelly Osbourne (granddaughter); Jack Osbourne (grandson); Ozzy Osbourne (son-in-law)

Don Arden (born Harry Levy; 4 January 1926 – 21 July 2007) was an English music manager, agent, and businessman. He managed the careers of rock acts such as Jerry Lee Lewis, Little Richard, Gene Vincent, Air Supply, Small Faces, the Move, Black Sabbath, Electric Light Orchestra, and Trickster.

Arden gained a reputation in Britain for his aggressive, sometimes illegal business tactics which led to him being called "Mr Big", the "English Godfather" and the "Al Capone of Pop". His success story turned sour when his violent 'negotiating' methods and questionable accounting caught up with him, and he became estranged from members of his own family.

He was married to Hope Shaw, a former ballet dancer/teacher, who died in 1999. He was the father of David Levy and Sharon Osbourne.

== Early life and career ==
Arden was born Harry Levy on 4 January 1926, into a Jewish family in Cheetham Hill, Manchester, the son of Sarah "Sally" (née Black, later Urbanowitz) and Lazarus Levy, a factory machinist. Arden began his show-business career when he was 13 years old as a singer and stand-up comic after (allegedly) briefly attending the Royal College of Music. In 1944, he changed his name from Harry Levy to Don Arden. After being demobilized from the British Army at the end of World War II, Arden returned to civilian life to develop his show-business career from 1946 to 1953.

Arden worked as an entertainer on the British variety circuit. He impersonated singers such as Enrico Caruso and film actors known for gangster roles, such as Edward G. Robinson and George Raft. On weekends, Yiddish-speaking Arden impressed Jewish audiences with his Al Jolson routine. Arden reputedly sang lead vocals with The Canadians on "Blue Suede Shoes" for the Embassy label, on which he tried to impersonate Elvis Presley. Arden also appeared as a guest with the Black and White Minstrels. In 1954, he became a showbiz agent, after realising it would be more profitable. He began his career organising Hebrew folk song contests, then started putting together his own shows.

Arden launched his career as a manager when he signed up American rock 'n' roller Gene Vincent in 1960, taking over from John Schatt. Arden could not control Vincent's compulsive alcoholism and the relationship ended when Vincent reportedly pulled a knife on his manager. For a short period of time in the early 1960s, he worked with the British singer Elkie Brooks at the start of her career. During 1964, Arden moved into beat group pop management with The Nashville Teens, who secured chart hits with "Tobacco Road", "Google Eye" and "Find My Way Back Home". According to Johnny Rogan's book Starmakers & Svengalis, the group's earnings from those hits was £3,513. When group member John Hawken confronted Arden about some confusion over monies to be collected, his manager told him: "I have the strength of ten men in these hands" and threatened to throw him from an office window.

In 1965, Arden met aspiring rock band Small Faces in his office in Carnaby Street. Half an hour later, he had signed them up. Arden was immediately struck by the potential of Small Faces: "I thought at that time, on the first hearing, I thought it was the best band in the world". Kenney Jones, Small Faces' drummer, said: "He was kind of a Jewish teddy bear I suppose. You liked him immediately because he was enthusiastic and he talked about what he could do and what he couldn't do and whenever he said – 'I'll do this, I'll do that' – he did and it came true." The band's debut single, "Whatcha Gonna Do About It", was ushered into the hit parade by "chart-fixing", which cost Arden £12,000. Arden denied it was cheating: "I had a saying, you can't polish a turd. In other words, if the record's no good to begin with it still won't be any good after you've wasted your time and money getting it played".

== Business methods ==
In 1966, Arden and a squad of "minders" turned up at impresario Robert Stigwood's office to "teach him a lesson" for daring to discuss a change of management with Small Faces, which became one of the most notorious incidents from the 1960s British pop business. Arden reportedly threatened to throw Stigwood out of the window if he ever interfered with his business again.

The band were never entirely convinced that Arden had paid them everything he owed them. Kenney Jones has mixed memories of the band's stormy relationship with Arden:

Without Don, the Small Faces may not have existed, without his sort of vision at that time, be it short-lived or what. The fact is we became known and we got a break through Don. So if you think of it like that and I think all of us are prepared to swallow what went on, leave it, fine, it's history. We all learned from each other, he gave us our first break, fine, fair enough, you know, leave it. I've got good and bad memories but mainly I think of Don with affection, surprisingly enough.

Arden tried to rekindle his former glories as a family entertainer by releasing a single of his own in 1967: "Sunrise, Sunset", from the musical Fiddler on the Roof, but it failed to chart. He returned to music management in 1968 when he signed The Move. He struck gold when two groups formed by ex-Move members, ELO and Wizzard (1972), started having international hits: Wizzard with "See My Baby Jive" and "Angel Fingers" (1973), and ELO with "10538 Overture" (1972) and "Roll Over Beethoven" (1973). With later albums like Out of the Blue (1977) and Discovery (1979), ELO became a prominent act. In 1973, Arden took over management of singer-songwriter Lynsey de Paul. In the following year, she provided the first hit on his new Jet label, "No Honestly", which was also the theme tune to a hit ITV comedy, No, Honestly. By 1976, Arden was embroiled in a lawsuit with the distraught singer over what she claimed was late payment of money owed to her. De Paul commented:

It was a time in my life that I'll never forget and I'll never forgive him. And if anybody was near suicide, and if ever I was near, it was then, because it was awful.

She eventually reached a settlement with Arden in 1978.

Arden managed Black Sabbath for many years. In 1974 he arranged for the band to appear in the first California Jam festival. Ozzy Osborne stated later in an interview with Musician magazine:

Our manager gave us each $1000 and put us on the plane, economy class. We later found out we had received $250,000 for the show: he kept it all.

In time Arden also brought his son David and daughter Sharon into the business, intending to build an Arden showbiz dynasty.

== Estrangement from Sharon Osbourne and legal problems ==
In 1979, one of Arden's successes, Black Sabbath, sacked their vocalist Ozzy Osbourne. Sharon began a relationship with Osbourne, and took over his management from her father. Arden was livid. Reportedly, the next time Sharon visited Don, his vicious pet dogs savaged her. She was pregnant at the time and lost the child. Sharon eventually married Osbourne and had no contact with her father for 20 years. Osbourne revealed in his autobiography I Am Ozzy that Sharon used to tell their children that her father was dead, and only changed that after the first time Sharon saw Arden in decades, finding him in front of Nate 'n Al of Beverly Hills while driving the family, prompting her to brake and profanely insult him from inside the car before speeding away. Sharon would also attempt to run over Arden when she saw him in the parking lot of a Century City mall.

In 1979, the investigative reporter Roger Cook used the dispute with Lynsey de Paul to probe Arden's controversial management style on BBC Radio 4's Checkpoint programme. It proved to be a colourful encounter. "When you fight the champion you go fifteen rounds, you've got to be prepared to go the whole way", Arden tells Cook. "I'll take you with one hand strapped up my arse. You're not a man, you're a creep." Arden threatened to break the neck of anyone who talked to Cook in his on-air interview.

From the late 1970s into the early 1980s, Arden enjoyed the high-rolling lifestyle of a top music mogul. In the mid-1980s, he bought Portland Recording Studios (formerly IBC Studios) from Chas Chandler and installed his son David as manager. The studio's equipment was very outdated by that time, and much of the income was being generated by another company known as RadioTracks, which ran half the facility, and by George Peckham (Porky Prime Cuts), a well-known cutting engineer, whose cutting rooms were on the ground floor at the back of the building. Arden had acquired shares in RadioTracks by buying out Chandler without the knowledge of the other directors.

In 1986, Arden was arrested for kidnapping and torturing a Jet records accountant named Harshad Patel, who Arden believed had been embezzling money. Arden's son, known legally as 'David Levy', appeared at the Old Bailey in 1986 for his role in the matter. The incident occurred at the offices at 35 Portland Place. Convicted, Levy spent several months in an open prison. Arden, tried separately on related charges, was acquitted. The drawn-out dispute meant Arden was unable to attend to business, and legal costs proved a fatal strain on Jet Records, which collapsed. Portland Recording Studios were considerably in arrears with rent to the Prudential, which owned the building at Portland Place, close to the BBC's Broadcasting House. Eventually, the Prudential evicted Jet Records. From 1986 to the mid-1990s, Arden shuttled between his homes in Beverly Hills, California and Parkside in Wimbledon, London.

== Reconciliation with Sharon Osbourne and final years ==
In 2001 Sharon Osbourne told The Guardian: "The best lesson I ever had was watching him fuck his business up. He taught me everything not to do. My father's never even seen any of my three kids and, as far as I'm concerned, he never will." Later the same year, at Ozzy's insistence, Sharon and Arden finally reconciled, with Arden taking a walk-on role in the successful reality TV show The Osbournes in 2002. He also met his grandchildren Jack and Kelly for the first time on the show, and he met his granddaughter Aimee off-screen. Ozzy stated that about a year after Sharon's mother Hope died, she learned Arden was sick, and in spite of her estrangement arranged him a place to live. Once David told Ozzy that Arden had Alzheimer's disease, Ozzy would push Sharon towards making amends, saying that "even if it's just to call him an arsehole again, do it now" given Arden's mental situation would start decaying.

In August 2004, Sharon revealed publicly about Arden's Alzheimer's. A "tell all" biography about Arden's life, entitled Mr Big, was published in 2007, shortly before Arden's death in Los Angeles on 21 July 2007. Sharon Osbourne paid for her father's care in the last years of his life. He was buried in Agecroft Jewish Cemetery on Langley Road in Pendlebury, Salford, on 25 July. The burial was attended by David and his daughter as well as Arden's sister Eileen. Sharon was absent, declaring she was "too traumatized to go". While Arden previously expressed an interest in being buried alongside Hope in Surrey, Sharon opted to send him to the same Jewish cemetery of his mother's grave.

On 29 October 2007, a memorial headstone was unveiled at Agecroft by his sister Eileen (Somers), daughter Sharon Osbourne, grandson Jack Osbourne and nephew and niece Danny Somers and Cathy Cowan. One line on the inscription reads: "His beautiful voice will sing in our hearts forever. Shalom". Later in the morning a plaque was unveiled at Higher Crumpsall Synagogue, Cheetham Hill, Manchester, with the addition of the words "It all started here" with a line of musical notes. That refers to the time when Arden, then Harry Levy, sang in the synagogue choir as a very young man.-

== Carnaby Street plaque ==
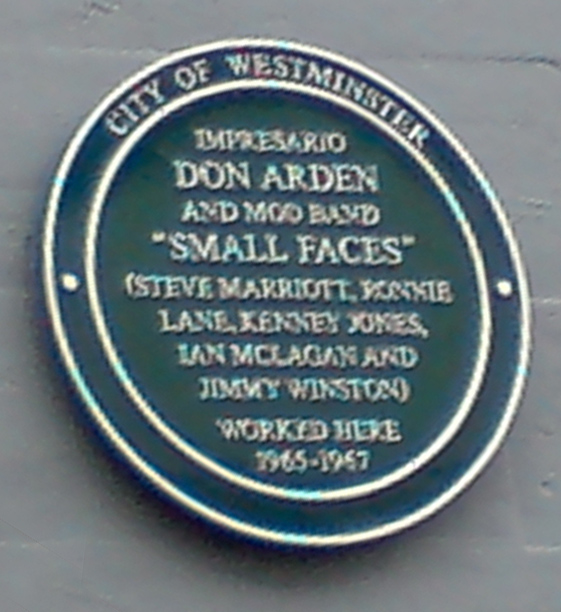
Carnaby Street plaque

On 8 September 2007, a commemorative plaque dedicated to Don Arden and Small Faces was unveiled at 52–55 Carnaby Street, London, Arden's former offices. Kenney Jones, ex-drummer of Small Faces, said: "To honour the Small Faces after all these years is a terrific achievement. I only wish that Steve Marriott, Ronnie Lane and the late Don Arden were here to enjoy this moment with me".
