= Kenney Jones =

English drummer (born 1948)

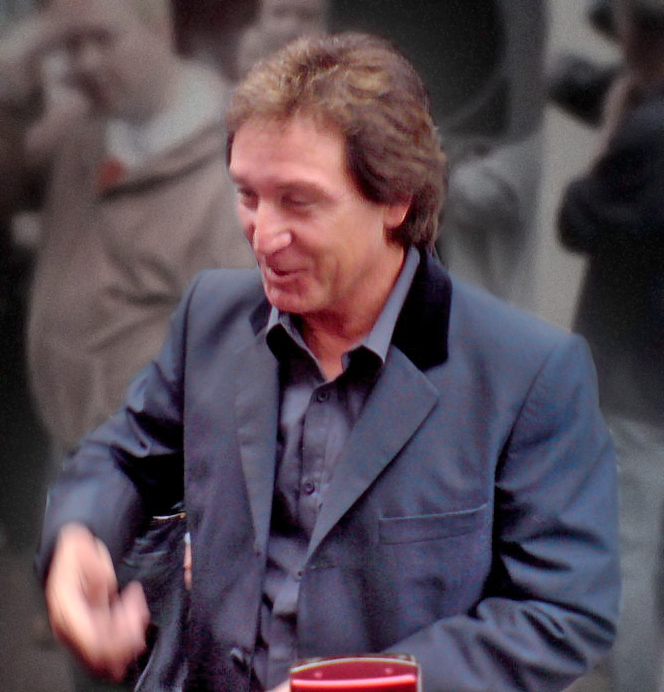
- Jones in 2007

Background information
- Born: Kenneth Thomas Jones; 16 September 1948 (age 77); Whitechapel, London, England
- Genres: Rock; hard rock
- Occupation: Musician
- Instruments: Drums; percussion
- Years active: 1964–present
- Member of: The Jones Gang; Faces
- Formerly of: Small Faces; The Who; The Law
- Website: kenneyjones.com

Kenneth Thomas Jones (born 16 September 1948) is an English drummer best known for his work in the groups Small Faces, Faces and the Who. Jones was inducted into the Rock and Roll Hall of Fame in 2012 as a member of Small Faces/Faces.

== Biography ==
=== Early life ===
Kenneth Thomas Jones was born on 16 September 1948 in Whitechapel, London, England.

=== Small Faces to Faces ===
Having previously been in a band with Ronnie Lane, Jones was one of the founding members of the English rock group Small Faces. Active from 1965 to 1969, Small Faces were part of the Mod trend of the 1960s. Their hits included "All or Nothing", "Sha-La-La-La-Lee", "Itchycoo Park" and "Tin Soldier".

In 2007, Small Faces were honoured by Westminster Council with a commemorative plaque placed at what was Don Arden's offices in Carnaby Street, the band's "spiritual home". Jones himself unveiled the plaque. In a BBC interview, Jones said: "To honour the Small Faces after all these years is a terrific achievement. I only wish that Steve Marriott, Ronnie Lane and Don Arden were here to enjoy this moment with me". Since the death of Jimmy Winston in September 2020, Jones and Rick Wills are the sole surviving members of the Small Faces.

In 2004 The Observer listed the Small Faces' 1968 release Ogdens' Nut Gone Flake one of the "top British albums of all time".

After the departure of lead singer/guitarist Steve Marriott in 1969, the group recruited singer Rod Stewart and guitarist Ronnie Wood to replace Marriott. Both were formerly with the Jeff Beck Group. The band changed its name to Faces, as the original name was associated with the small stature of its members, and Stewart and Wood did not fit the description. Jones remained with the band until its dissolution in late 1975, recording four studio albums and a live album with them.

=== The Who ===
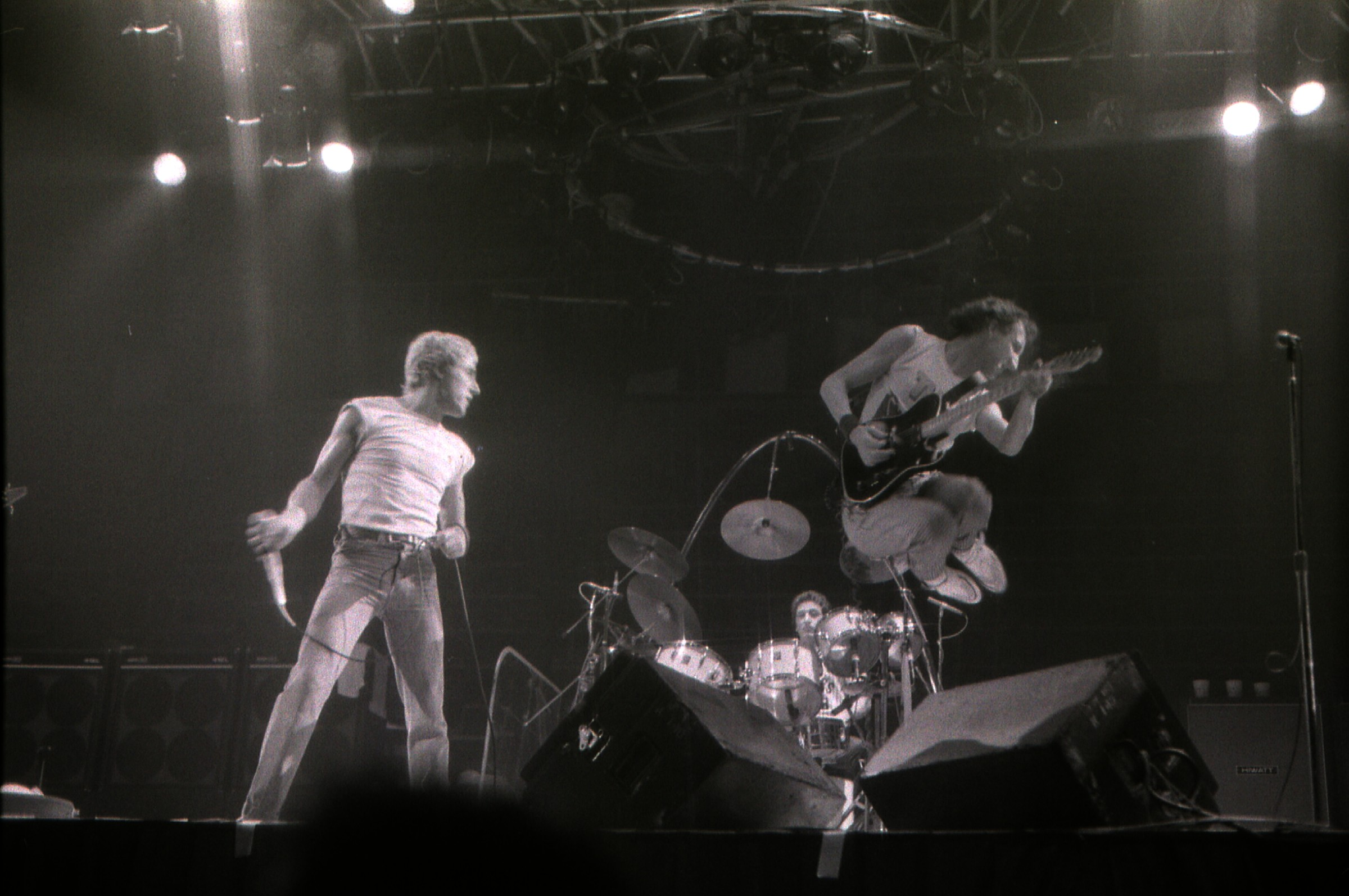
Jones drumming with the Who in 1980

In November 1978, Jones was invited by guitarist Pete Townshend and manager Bill Curbishley to join the Who, replacing their original drummer Keith Moon, who had died of a drug overdose in September. He was invited, in part, because the band had been friendly with him from his days with the Small Faces (he and Moon were friends and were together on the last night of Moon's life in 1978, as part of the viewing party put together by Paul McCartney for The Buddy Holly Story), and because he had played with Townshend, Roger Daltrey and John Entwistle on the Tommy soundtrack. He played on the albums Face Dances and It's Hard and also played on the soundtrack for Daltrey's film McVicar, as well as on the band's tours from 1979 to 1982. Jones played with the band at Live Aid in 1985.

Jones' final appearance as a regular member of the Who was when the group received a lifetime achievement award at the 1988 British Phonographic Industry awards ceremony. He was frequently at odds with Daltrey, who felt that Jones's drumming style was not a good match with the band (Jones's playing was usually straighter and less frenetic than Moon's), but Daltrey has denied having anything personal against Jones or his drumming, stating: "I'm not saying he's a bad drummer. I'm not saying he's a bad guy. I didn't dislike the guy, but I just felt he wasn't the right drummer for the Who. It's like having a wheel off a Cadillac stuck onto a Rolls Royce. It's a great wheel but it's the wrong one."

Jones was replaced by Simon Phillips for the Who's 1989 reunion tour. In an April 2011 special edition of Uncut magazine, Townshend said that Jones was a good choice for the band.

Jones reunited with the Who on 14 June 2014 at the Rock n Horsepower benefit concert held at his Hurtwood Polo Club. The band performed for an event set up by Jones to benefit Prostate Cancer UK, an organization that promotes awareness of the disease that Jones has. It was the first time that he had appeared onstage with Townshend and Daltrey since 1988. Sharing the bill were contemporaries such as Jeff Beck, Procol Harum and Mike Rutherford.

=== The Law ===
In 1991 Jones and singer Paul Rodgers co-founded a band called the Law, which was active for about a year and released one album.

=== The Jones Gang ===
In 2001, Jones formed a new band; over several months, the line-up solidified to include Rick Wills and Robert Hart. In 2005, the Jones Gang released their debut album, Any Day Now.

=== Guest appearances ===
Jones has been featured on recordings as a guest drummer on many recording sessions, including appearances on albums by Rod Stewart, the Rolling Stones, Ronnie Wood, Roger Daltrey, Andy Fairweather-Low, Joan Armatrading, Keith Moon, Marsha Hunt, Mike Batt, Pete Townshend, Chuck Berry, Jerry Lee Lewis, David Essex, John Lodge, and Wings. He was also on a Top of the Pops performance with Status Quo, performing their 1986 hit single, "Red Sky".

=== Outside music ===
Outside of music, Jones is a fan of polo. He has become an accomplished polo player and is the owner of Hurtwood Park Polo Club, in Ewhurst, Surrey.

On behalf of Small Faces and in memory of his late colleagues Steve Marriott and Ronnie Lane, Jones established a children's charity, the Small Faces Charitable Trust, in 1999.

Jones is a supporter of the Conservative Party, and recorded a song called "Mr Brown" written by Robert Hart, criticising the tax policies of the then Chancellor of Exchequer Gordon Brown. He has also performed in support of the Countryside Alliance.

Jones' memoir, Let the Good Times Roll: My Life in Small Faces, Faces, and The Who, was published in September 2018 (ISBN 9781250193568).

== Personal life ==
Jones has six children. He is married to retired model Jayne Andrew, mother of four of his children. He was previously married to singer Jan Osborne, sister of Gary Osborne. In September 2013 he was diagnosed with prostate cancer, for which he was treated with brachytherapy.

Jones stated that he "virtually taught" Zak Starkey, son of Ringo Starr, how to play drums. Jones was close friends with Starkey's parents. After replacing Moon in the Who, Jones gave Starkey one of Moon's old drum kits. In 1996, Starkey became the Who's touring drummer.
