= List of songs recorded by Faces =

Faces was an English rock band formed in 1969. They released 4 studio albums between 1970 and 1973. The original lineup consisted of Rod Stewart on lead vocals, Ronnie Wood on lead guitar, Ronnie Lane on bass guitar, Ian "Mac" McLagan on keyboards, and Kenney Jones on drums. Lane was replaced by former Free bassist Tetsu Yamauchi in mid 1973, shortly after the release of their final album, and the group disbanded in 1975. The original lineup was inducted into the Rock and Roll Hall of Fame in 2012 (as “Small Faces/Faces”).

== Table ==
Title	Year Recorded	Album	Songwriter(s)	Lead vocal(s)	Length
"(I Know) I'm Losing You"	1970	Single (Every Picture Tells a Story)	Norman Whitfield/Edward Holland, Jr./Cornelius Grant	Stewart	4.56
"Angel"	1973	Five Guys Walk into a Bar...	Jimi Hendrix	Stewart	2.50
"Around the Plynth"	1969	First Step	Stewart/Wood	Stewart	5.52
"Bad 'n' Ruin"	1970	Long Player	McLagan/Stewart	Stewart	5.25
"Borstal Boys"	1973	Ooh La La	McLagan/Stewart/Wood	Stewart	2.53
"Cindy Incidentally"	1973	Ooh La La	McLagan/Stewart/Wood	Stewart	2.39
"Cut Across Shorty"	1971	Five Guys Walk into a Bar...	Marijohn Wilkin/Wayne Walker	Stewart	5.44
"Debris"	1971	A Nod Is As Good As a Wink... to a Blind Horse	Lane	Lane	4.36
"Devotion"	1969	First Step	Lane	Stewart, Lane	4.55
"Every Picture Tells a Story"	1973	Coast to Coast: Overture and Beginners	Stewart/Wood	Stewart	5.55
"Flags and Banners"	1972	Ooh La La	Lane/Stewart	Lane	2.02
"Fly in the Ointment"	1972	Ooh La La	Jones/Lane/McLagan/Wood	instrumental	3.51
"Flying"	1969	First Step	Lane/Stewart/Wood	Stewart	4.15
"Gasoline Alley"	1970	Five Guys Walk into a Bar...	Stewart/Wood	Stewart	5.33
"Glad and Sorry"	1972	Ooh La La	Lane	Lane, Wood, McLagan	3.07
"Had Me a Real Good Time"	1971	Long Player	Lane/Stewart/Wood	Stewart	5.50
"I Feel So Good"	1970	Long Player	Big Bill Broonzy	Stewart	8.44
"I Wish It Would Rain"	1973	Five Guys Walk into a Bar...	Norman Whitfield/Barrett Strong/Roger Penzabene	Stewart	4.55
"I'd Rather Go Blind"	1975	Five Guys Walk into a Bar...	Ellington Jordan/Billy Foster	Stewart	3.45
"If I'm on the Late Side"	1973	Ooh La La	Lane/Stewart	Stewart	2.39
"It's All Over Now"	1973	Coast to Coast: Overture and Beginners	Bobby Womack/Shirley Womack	Stewart	4.55
"Jealous Guy"	1973	Coast to Coast: Overture and Beginners	John Lennon	Stewart	2.45
"Jerusalem"	1971	Long Player	traditional (arranged by Wood)	instrumental	1.53
"Jodie"	1973	Single (B-side)	Wood/Stewart/McLagan	Stewart	6.33
"Just Another Honky"	1973	Ooh La La	Lane	Stewart	3.35
"Last Orders Please"	1971	A Nod Is As Good As a Wink... to a Blind Horse	Lane	Lane	4.55
"Looking Out the Window"	1969	First Step	Jones/McLagan	instrumental	5.02
"Love in Vain"	1971	Five Guys Walk into a Bar...	Robert Johnson	Stewart	5.56
"Love Lives Here"	1971	A Nod Is As Good As a Wink... to a Blind Horse	Lane/Stewart/Wood	Stewart	3.50
"Maggie May"	1971	Five Guys Walk into a Bar...	Stewart/Martin Quittenton	Stewart	3.32
"Maybe I'm Amazed"	1971	Single (studio) Long Player (live)	Paul McCartney	Lane, Stewart	6.34
"Memphis, Tennessee"	1971	A Nod Is As Good As a Wink... to a Blind Horse	Chuck Berry	Stewart	5.33
"Miss Judy's Farm"	1971	A Nod Is As Good As a Wink... to a Blind Horse	Stewart/Wood	Stewart	5.44
"My Fault"	1973	Ooh La La	McLagan/Stewart/Wood	Stewart, Wood (duet)	3.44
"My Way of Giving"	1970	Gasoline Alley	Lane, Steve Marriott	Stewart, Lane, McLagan	3.33
"Nobody Knows"	1970	First Step	Lane/Wood	Stewart, Lane (duet)	4.05
"Oh Lord, I'm Browned Off"	1971	Single (B-side) (Five Guys Walk into a Bar...)	Jones/Lane/McLagan/Wood	Instrumental	4.55
"Oh No (Not My Baby)"	1973	Single (A-side)	Gerry Goffin/Carole King	Stewart	3.45
"On the Beach"	1970	Long Player	Lane/Wood	Lane, Wood (duet)	2.33
"Ooh La La"	1973	Ooh La La	Lane/Wood	Wood	4.33
"Open to Ideas"	1975	Good Boys... When They're Asleep	McLagan/Stewart/Wood	Stewart	4.55
"Pineapple and the Monkey"	1969	First Step	Wood	instrumental	4.24
"Pool Hall Richard"	1973	Single (Five Guys Walk into a Bar...)	Stewart/Wood	Stewart	3.55
"Rear Wheel Skid"	1970	Single (B-side) (Five Guys Walk into a Bar...)	Jones/Lane/McLagan/Wood	Instrumental	2.50
"Richmond"	1970	Long Player	Lane	Lane	3.56
"Shake, Shudder, Shiver"	1969	First Step	Lane/Wood	Stewart, Lane (duet)	3.13
"Silicone Grown"	1973	Ooh La La	Stewart/Wood	Stewart	2.35
"Stay with Me"	1971	A Nod Is As Good As a Wink... to a Blind Horse	Stewart/Wood	Stewart	5.22
"Stone"	1969	First Step	Lane	Lane	5.36
"Sweet Lady Mary"	1970	Long Player	Lane/Stewart/Wood	Stewart	4.22
"Tell Everyone"	1970	Long Player	Lane	Stewart	2.57
"That's All You Need"	1971	A Nod Is As Good As a Wink.. to a Blind Horse	Stewart/Wood	Stewart	6.00
"Three Button Hand Me Down"	1969	First Step	McLagan/Stewart	Stewart	5.45
"Too Bad"	1971	A Nod Is As Good As a Wink... to a Blind Horse	Stewart/Wood	Stewart	4.33
"Too Much Woman (I Wanna Be Loved)"	1971	BBC recording	Ike Turner	Stewart	2.58
"True Blue"	1971	Never a Dull Moment	Stewart/Wood	Stewart	4.59
"Twistin' the Night Away"	1971	Never a Dull Moment	Sam Cooke	Stewart	8.15
"Wicked Messenger"	1969	First Step	Bob Dylan	Stewart	4.05
"You Can Make Me Dance, Sing or Anything"	1974	Single (Five Guys Walk into a Bar...)	Jones/McLagan/Stewart/Wood/Yamauchi	Stewart	4.21
"You're My Girl (I Don't Want to Discuss It)"	1970	Gasoline Alley	Dick Cooper/Beth Beatty/Ernie Shelby	Stewart	2.46
"You're So Rude"	1971	A Nod Is As Good As a Wink... to a Blind Horse	Lane/McLagan	Lane	3.56

== Related Pages ==
- Faces
- Faces discography
- Rod Stewart
- Ronnie Wood
- Ronnie Lane
- Ian McLagan
- Kenney Jones
- Tetsu Yamauchi
- Rod Stewart discography
- List of Rock and Roll Hall of Fame inductees
