= Faces discography =

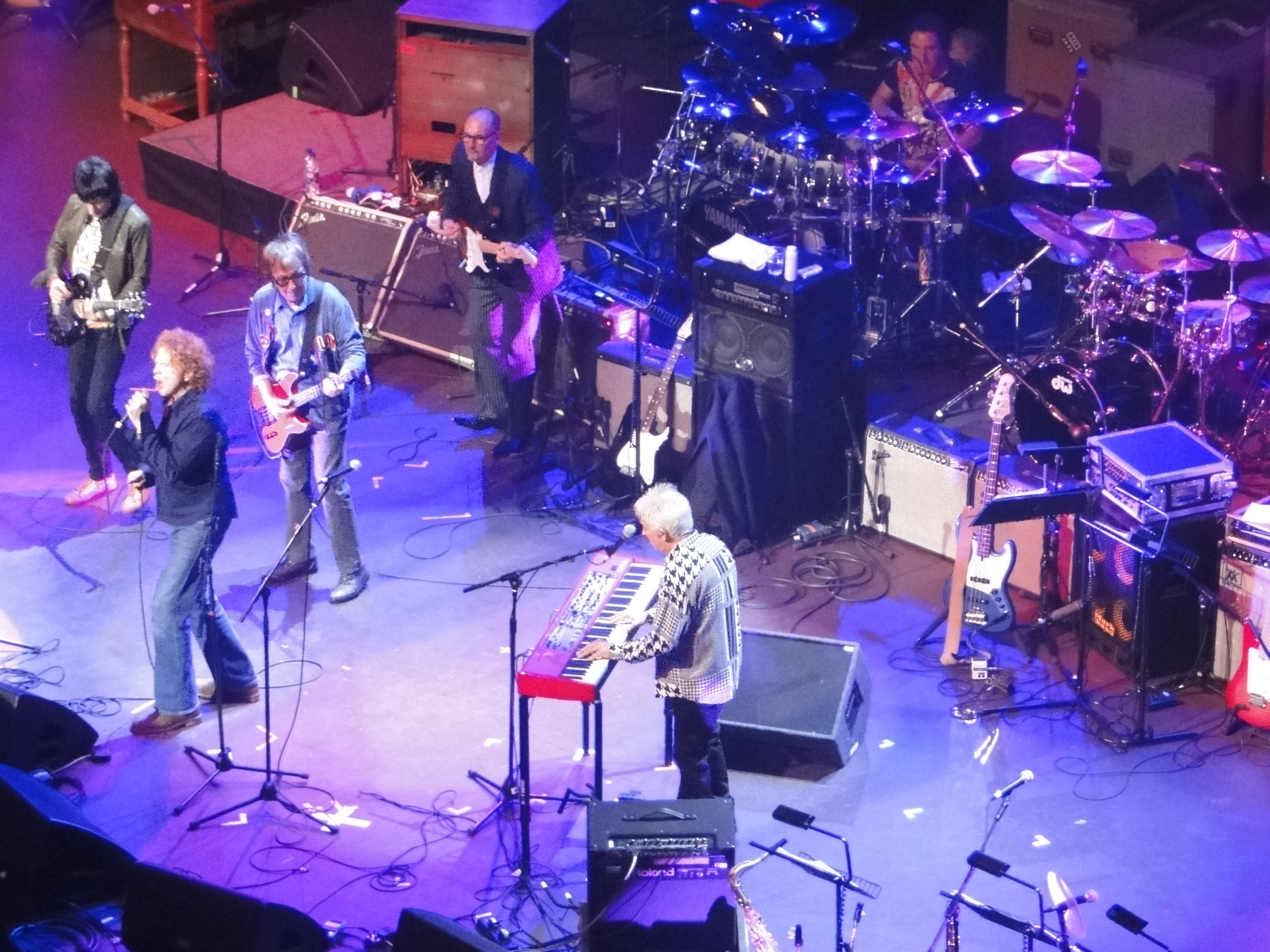
- Faces in 2009
- Studio albums: 4
- Live albums: 1
- Compilation albums: 13 (3 box sets)
- Singles: 11

The discography of British rock band Faces consists of four original studio albums, one live album, and eleven seven inch singles. As of 2025, in addition to the core catalogue, ten compilation albums and three box sets (many of them featuring previously unreleased live and studio material) have also been released. Additionally, the group members made various appearances, individually or as a collective, on lead singer Rod Stewart's first four solo albums.

== Albums ==
=== Studio albums ===
Year	Title	Peak chart positions							Certifications
Year	Title	US	CAN	AUS	NLD	NOR	GER	UK	Certifications
1970	First Step	119	74	—	—	—	—	45	
1971	Long Player	29	34	18	—	—	—	31	
1971	A Nod Is As Good As a Wink... to a Blind Horse	6	5	4	3	10	34	2	RIAA: Gold
1973	Ooh La La	21	23	9	—	22	—	1	
"—" denotes releases that did not chart or were not released in that territory.

=== Live albums ===
Year	Title	Peak chart positions				Certification
Year	Title	US	CAN	AUS	UK	Certification
1974	Coast to Coast: Overture and Beginners	63	51	38	3	BPI: Silver

=== Compilation albums ===
Year	Title	UK	Certification
1974	Two Originals of ... Faces (double LP repackage of the First Step and Long Player albums)	—	
1976	Snakes and Ladders / The Best of Faces (US only)	—	
1977	The Best of The Faces (double LP album) (UK/Europe only)	24	BPI: Gold
1999	Good Boys... When They're Asleep (including a previously unreleased track from the band's final studio session in 1975)	32	BPI: Gold
2003	Changing Faces – The Very Best of Rod Stewart and the Faces	13	BPI: Gold
2004	Five Guys Walk into a Bar... (four disc box set compilation including rarities and previously unreleased material)	—	
2007	The Definitive Rock Collection	—	
2009	The Best of Faces	—	
2012	Stay with Me: The Faces Anthology (including two previously unreleased live tracks)	—	
2015	1970–1975: You Can Make Me Dance, Sing or Anything (five disc box set compiling the band's four studio albums with previously unreleased studio tracks and a bonus disc of rarities)	—	
2018	An Introduction to Faces	—	
2024	Faces At The BBC: The Complete Concert & Session Recordings 1970–1973 (box set of six studio sessions and seven live concerts for BBC radio and television over eight CDs and one Blu-ray)	—	
2025	Early Steps (CD and LP compilation of previously unreleased demos and rehearsals from 1969, predating the recording of the band's first album)	—	

== Singles ==
Year	Title (A-side / B-side)	Peak chart positions						Certifications	Album
Year	Title (A-side / B-side)	US	CAN	GER	NLD	AUS	UK	Certifications	Album
1969	"Flying" / "Three-Button Hand-Me-Down" (UK only)	—	—	—	—	—	—		First Step
1970	"Around the Plynth" / "Wicked Messenger" (US only)	—	—	—	—	—	—		First Step
1970	"Had Me a Real Good Time" (original 1970 mix) / "Rear Wheel Skid"	—	—	—	—	—	—		Non-album singles
1971	"Maybe I'm Amazed" / "Oh Lord, I'm Browned Off" (US only)	—	—	—	—	—	—		Non-album singles
1971	"Stay with Me" / "Debris"	17	4	28	4	41	6	BPI: Silver	A Nod Is as Good as a Wink... to a Blind Horse
1971	"(I Know) I'm Losing You" (A-side credited to 'Rod Stewart with Faces' / B-side Rod Stewart solo track) (US only)	24	13	—	—	—	—		Every Picture Tells a Story
1973	"Cindy Incidentally" / "Skewiff (Mend the Fuse)" (non-album track)	48	47	—	25	53	2		Ooh La La
1973	"Ooh La La" / "Borstal Boys" (US only)	—	—	—	—	—	—	BPI: Gold	Ooh La La
1973	"Selections from Ooh La La" / "Dishevelment Blues" (promotional flexidisc single given away with the New Musical Express) (UK only)	—	—	—	—	—	—		Non-album singles
1973	"Pool Hall Richard" / "I Wish It Would Rain" (with a trumpet) (B-side recorded live at the Reading Festival 1973) (UK only)	—	—	—	—	96	8		Non-album singles
1974	"You Can Make Me Dance, Sing or Anything (Even Take the Dog for a Walk, Mend a Fuse, Fold Away the Ironing Board, or Any Other Domestic Shortcomings)" / "As Long as You Tell Him"	—	—	—	—	100	12		Non-album singles
"—" denotes releases that did not chart or were not released in that territory.
