= The Definitive Rock Collection (Faces album) =

Compilation album by Faces
- Released: 2007
- Genre: Rock and roll, boogie rock
- Length: 2:05:01
- Label: Rhino Records

Faces chronology
Five Guys Walk into a Bar... (2004)	The Definitive Rock Collection (2007)	The Best of Faces (2009)

Professional ratings
Review scores
Source	Rating
AllMusic	5/5 stars

The Definitive Rock Collection is a two-disc retrospective of the British rock group Faces released in 2007, collecting thirty tracks from among the group's four studio albums, various single A and B-sides (including two 'solo' Rod Stewart tracks which were actually Faces performances), and an outtake from the sessions for a proposed but ultimately abandoned 1975 album.

The collection includes six of ten tracks from 1970's First Step (originally credited to Small Faces); four of nine from 1971's Long Player, including the studio-recorded US-only single version of their cover of Paul McCartney's "Maybe I'm Amazed"; eight of nine from 1971's A Nod Is as Good as a Wink...To a Blind Horse; and seven of ten tracks from 1973's Ooh La La.

The liner notes are written by Sean Egan.

The Definitive Rock Collection has received a largely positive response from critics since its release. It's the AllMusic "album pick" for compilations of the band (non- box set). Thom Jurek wrote for AllMusic that "this baby replaces the previous collection (Good Boys... When They're Asleep) in sound and content."

== Track listing ==
=== Disc 1 ===
1. "Wicked Messenger" (Bob Dylan) – from First Step (March 1970)
2. "Shake, Shudder, Shiver" (Ronnie Lane and Ron Wood) – from First Step
3. "Around the Plynth" (Rod Stewart and Ron Wood) – from First Step
4. "Flying" (Ronnie Lane, Rod Stewart and Ron Wood) – from First Step
5. "Pineapple and the Monkey" (Ron Wood) – from First Step
6. "Three Button Hand Me Down" (Ian McLagan and Rod Stewart) – from First Step
7. "Bad 'N' Ruin" (Ian McLagan and Rod Stewart) –from First Step
8. "Sweet Lady Mary" (Ronnie Lane, Rod Stewart and Ron Wood) – from Long Player (February 1971)
9. "Had Me a Real Good Time" (Ronnie Lane, Rod Stewart and Ron Wood) – from Long Player
10. "(I Know) I'm Losing You" (Cornelius Grant, Eddie Holland, Norman Whitfield) – from Every Picture Tells A Story and a US-only single A-side (May 1971)
11. "Maybe I'm Amazed" (Paul McCartney) – (studio version, US-only single A-side, 1971)
12. "Miss Judy's Farm" (Rod Stewart and Ron Wood) – from A Nod Is as Good as a Wink...To a Blind Horse (November 1971)
13. "You're So Rude" (Ronnie Lane and Ian McLagan) – from A Nod Is as Good as a Wink...To a Blind Horse
14. "Love Lives Here" (Ronnie Lane, Rod Stewart and Ron Wood) – from A Nod Is as Good as a Wink...To a Blind Horse
15. "Last Orders Please" (Ronnie Lane) – from A Nod Is as Good as a Wink...To a Blind Horse

=== Disc 2 ===
1. "Stay With Me" (Rod Stewart and Ron Wood) – from A Nod Is as Good as a Wink...To a Blind Horse
2. "Debris" (Ronnie Lane) – from A Nod Is as Good as a Wink...To a Blind Horse
3. "Memphis, Tennessee" (Chuck Berry) – from A Nod Is as Good as a Wink...To a Blind Horse
4. "Too Bad" (Rod Stewart and Ron Wood) – from A Nod Is as Good as a Wink...To a Blind Horse
5. "Silicone Grown" (Rod Stewart and Ron Wood –) from Ooh La La (March 1973)
6. "Cindy Incidentally" (Ian McLagan, Rod Stewart and Ron Wood) – from Ooh La La
7. "My Fault" (Ian McLagan, Rod Stewart and Ron Wood) – from Ooh La La
8. "Glad and Sorry" (Ronnie Lane) – from Ooh La La
9. "Borstal Boys" (Ian McLagan, Rod Stewart and Ron Wood) – from Ooh La La
10. "Just Another Honky" (Ronnie Lane) – from Ooh La La
11. "Ooh La La" (Ronnie Lane and Ron Wood) – from Ooh La La
12. "Jodie" (Ian McLagan, Rod Stewart and Ron Wood) – (B-side to Oh No (Not My Baby))
13. "Pool Hall Richard" (Rod Stewart and Ron Wood) – (A-side single, 1973)
14. "You Can Make Me Dance, Sing or Anything (Even Take the Dog for a Walk, Mend a Fuse, Fold Away the Ironing Board, or Any Other Domestic Shortcomings)" (K. Jones, Ian McLagan, Rod Stewart, Ron Wood and T. Yamauchi) – (A-side single, 1974)
15. "Open to Ideas" (Ian McLagan, Rod Stewart and Ron Wood) from The Faces' Last Sessions – (January 1975)

== Personnel ==
- Kenney Jones – drums, percussion (June 1969 – December 1975)
- Ronnie Lane – bass, acoustic guitar, dobro, tambourine, secondary and occasional lead vocals (June 1969 – June 1973)
- Ian McLagan – organ, acoustic and electric pianos, harmonium, clavinet, backing vocals (June 1969 – December 1975)
- Rod Stewart – lead vocals, banjo, rhythm guitar on "Flags and Banners" and "I Feel So Good" (July 1969 – December 1975)
- Ronnie Wood – lead, acoustic, slide, and pedal steel guitars, bass, harmonica, electric bouzouki, vocals (June 1969 – December 1975)
- Tetsu Yamauchi – bass (August 1973 – December 1975)

Featuring:

- Harry Beckett and Bobby Keyes – horns on "Had Me A Real Good Time" and "Tonight's Number"
