= Good Boys... When They're Asleep =

The Best of Faces: Good Boys... When They're Asleep...

Compilation album by Faces
- Released: 17 August 1999
- Recorded: August 1969 – February 1975
- Genre: Rock and roll, boogie rock
- Label: Rhino

Faces chronology
Snakes And Ladders / The Best of Faces (1976)	The Best of Faces: Good Boys... When They're Asleep... (1999)	Five Guys Walk into a Bar... (2004)

Good Boys... When They're Asleep... is a 1999 compilation of British rock group Faces. Compiled primarily by keyboardist Ian McLagan, it served to supersede the 1976 effort Snakes And Ladders / The Best of Faces, and to present a CD-length retrospective of the group, lasting nearly eighty minutes (although a UK-only double LP retrospective, Best of Faces, had already gone some way toward achieving those goals already as early as 1977, Good Boys was the first Faces compilation to benefit from the active involvement of a group member).

Rod Stewart performs lead vocals on fifteen of nineteen tracks, the set presents three tracks sung by Ronnie Lane, and the singing debut of Ronnie Wood on "Ooh La La." Included for the first time is one track from the Faces' final session, "Open to Ideas."

With the exception of a cover of Bob Dylan's "The Wicked Messenger," all of these tracks appear, alongside many others, on the comprehensive 2004 four-disc box set by the group (again curated by keyboardist Ian Mclagan) titled Five Guys Walk into a Bar....

Professional ratings
Review scores
Source	Rating
Allmusic	link

== Track listing ==
1. "Flying" (Lane, Stewart, Wood)
2. "Three Button Hand Me Down" (McLagan, Stewart)
3. "The Wicked Messenger" (Bob Dylan)
4. "Sweet Lady Mary" (Lane, Stewart, Wood)
5. "Bad 'n' Ruin" (McLagan, Stewart)
6. "Had Me a Real Good Time" (Lane, Stewart, Wood)
7. "Debris" (Lane)
8. "Miss Judy's Farm" (Stewart, Wood)
9. "You're So Rude" (Lane, McLagan)
10. "Too Bad" (Stewart, Wood)
11. "Love Lives Here" (Lane, Stewart, Wood)
12. "Stay with Me" (Stewart, Wood)
13. "Cindy Incidentally" (McLagan, Stewart, Wood)
14. "Glad and Sorry" (Lane)
15. "Borstal Boys" (McLagan, Stewart, Wood)
16. "Ooh La La" (Lane, Wood)
17. "Pool Hall Richard" (Stewart, Wood)
18. "You Can Make Me Dance, Sing or Anything (Even Take the Dog for a Walk, Mend a Fuse, Fold Away the Ironing Board, or Any Other Domestic Shortcomings)" (Jones, McLagan, Stewart, Wood, Yamauchi)
19. "Open to Ideas" (McLagan, Stewart, Wood)

== Personnel ==
- Kenney Jones – drums, percussion (1969–75)
- Ronnie Lane – bass, guitar, backing vocals, lead vocals on tracks 7, 9 and 14, percussion (1969–73)
- Ian McLagan – piano, organ, harmonium, clavinet, backing vocals (1969–75)
- Rod Stewart – lead and backing vocals (1969–75)
- Ronnie Wood – guitars, secondary bass on track 2, backing vocals, lead vocal on tracks 14 and 16, harmonica on track 9 (1969–75)
- Tetsu Yamauchi – bass on tracks 17–19 (1973–75)

== Charts ==
Chart (1999)	Peak position
Scottish Albums (OCC)	87
UK Albums (OCC)	79

Chart (2009)	Peak position
Scottish Albums (OCC)	27
UK Albums (OCC)	32

== Certifications ==
Region	Certification	Certified units/sales
United Kingdom (BPI)	Gold	100,000^{‡}
^{‡} Sales+streaming figures based on certification alone.

== Additional information ==
- Tracks 1–3 are from First Step (1970).
- Tracks 4–6 are from Long Player (1971).
- Tracks 7–12 are from A Nod Is as Good as a Wink... to a Blind Horse (1971).
- Tracks 13–16 are from Ooh La La (1973).
- Track 17 was from the 1973 single.
- Track 18 was from the 1975 single.
- Track 19 was previously unissued.
- Tracks 1, 4, 6, 8, 12, 13, 16–18 also appear on Snakes and Ladders / The Best of Faces (1976).
