= Snakes and Ladders / The Best of Faces =

Compilation album by Faces
- Released: 1976
- Genres: Rock and roll, boogie rock
- Length: 49:05
- Label: Warner Bros.

Faces chronology
Coast to Coast: Overture and Beginners (1974)	Snakes and Ladders / The Best of Faces (1976)	Good Boys... When They're Asleep (1999)

Snakes and Ladders / The Best of Faces was an October 1976 best-of album (the 7th album and 2nd compilation album) by British rock group Faces. While the first released Faces compilation was a repackaging of the group's first two LPs as a double album, this release presented the first attempt to compile the popular songs from the group after they had disbanded in 1975. Featuring photography by Tom Wright and unique cover art by guitarist Ronnie Wood, it was only eventually superseded in the US market by the CD compilation Good Boys... When They're Asleep in 1999.

The selections are however heavily biased in favour of Rod Stewart's contribution to the group, with only one track featuring Wood on vocals, and none featuring Ronnie Lane, the group's secondary vocalist and songwriter. Although he had left the band in 1973, Lane was a prominent founder member of the band and sang on and solely composed several tracks on each of the group's four original studio albums, but his songwriting is also under-represented here with his contributions confined to co-credits with Stewart and/or Wood. Lane is also not pictured in the collage of snapshots featured on the cover, while Jesse Ed Davis - who was only hired for the group's final tour of fall 1975 - does appear in some of them, despite never appearing on any of the studio tracks recorded by the group. Subsequent compilations, however, would go to great lengths to redress this collection's lack of representation of Lane's work - the first of these being a 1977 UK/European-only double-LP retrospective simply titled The Best Of The Faces, which effectively served as this album's expanded and more balanced counterpart in non-US markets.

The track listing of the original vinyl release of this compilation still remains unique however, in that the version of "Had Me a Real Good Time" presented there is the original 1970 single release, which is a noticeably different earlier mix to the 1971 Long Player album version (later reissues would substitute this mix with a short edit of the 'Long Player' mix). The original single mix, which runs at 3.49, has still not been recompiled elsewhere or released on CD as of 2019.

"Pineapple and the Monkey" would not appear on a Faces compilation again until the release of Faces: The Definitive Rock Collection in 2007.

Professional ratings
Review scores
Source	Rating
Allmusic	link
Christgau's Record Guide	B+

== Track listing ==
Side one

1. "Pool Hall Richard" (Rod Stewart, Ronnie Wood)
2. "Cindy Incidentally" (Ian McLagan, Stewart, Wood)
3. "Ooh La La" (Ronnie Lane, Wood)
4. "Sweet Lady Mary" (Lane, Stewart, Wood)
5. "Flying" (Lane, Stewart, Wood)
6. "Pineapple and the Monkey" (Wood)

Side two

1. "You Can Make Me Dance, Sing or Anything (Even Take the Dog For a Walk, Mend a Fuse, Fold Away the Ironing Board, or Any Other Domestic Shortcomings)" (Kenney Jones, McLagan, Stewart, Wood, Tetsu Yamauchi)
2. "Had Me a Real Good Time" [single version] (Lane, Stewart, Wood)
3. "Stay with Me" (Stewart, Wood)
4. "Miss Judy's Farm" (Stewart, Wood)
5. "Silicone Grown" (Stewart, Wood)
6. "Around the Plynth" (Stewart, Wood)

== Personnel ==
Track numbering refers to CD and digital releases of the album.

- Kenney Jones - drums, percussion
- Ronnie Lane - bass, guitar, percussion, backing vocals (except tracks 1, 7)
- Ian McLagan - piano, organ
- Rod Stewart - vocals
- Ronnie Wood - guitar, harmonica, backing vocals, lead vocals (track 3), bass (track 1)
- Tetsu Yamauchi - bass (track 7)
- Harry Beckett and Bobby Keyes - horns (track 8)

Note: Track 1, "Poolhall Richard", was recorded very shortly after Ronnie Lane's departure from the band and before his replacement Tetsu Yamauchi was hired. It is actually Wood who plays the bass guitar on the recording.

== Additional information ==
Track numbering refers to CD and digital releases of the album.

- Tracks 5, 6 and 12 from First Step (1970), and produced by the Faces.
- Track 4 from Long Player (1971), and produced by the Faces.
- Tracks 9 and 10 from A Nod Is as Good as a Wink... to a Blind Horse (1971), and produced by the Faces with Glyn Johns.
- Tracks 2, 3 and 11 from Ooh La La (1973), and produced by Glyn Johns.
- Track 1 from the 1973 single, and produced by the Faces.
- Track 7 from the 1975 single, and produced by the Faces.
- Track 8 from the 1970 single, and produced by the Faces.
