= Five Guys Walk into a Bar... =

Box set by Faces
- Released: 20 July 2004
- Recorded: June 1969 – 7 March 1975 at De Lane Lea Studios, London; Stargroves with the Rolling Stones Mobile Studio; Revox at Ronnie Lane's house in Richmond; Morgan Sound Studios, London; Olympic Studios, London; Maida Vale Studios, London; AIR Studios, London; Sunset Sound, Los Angeles; Quantum Studios, California; Paris Theatre, London; Reading Festival, Reading; Tampa Stadium, Tampa, Florida; Camden Theatre, London; BBC Music Studios, London; Swing Auditorium, San Bernardino, California
- Genres: Rock and roll, boogie rock
- Length: 5:07:12
- Label: Warner Bros. / Rhino Records
- Producers: Glyn Johns, The Faces

Faces chronology
Good Boys... When They're Asleep (1999)	Five Guys Walk into a Bar... (2004)	The Definitive Rock Collection (2007)

Professional ratings
Review scores
Source	Rating
AllMusic	5/5 stars

Five Guys Walk into a Bar... is a comprehensive four-disc retrospective of the British rock group Faces released in 2004, collecting sixty-seven tracks from among the group's four studio albums, assorted rare single A and B-sides, BBC sessions, rehearsal tapes and one track from a promotional flexi-disc, "Dishevelment Blues" – a deliberately-sloppy studio romp, captured during the sessions for their Ooh La La album, which was never actually intended for official release.

Eight of ten tracks from 1973's Ooh La La appear (along with a live version of "My Fault"), as do eight of nine from 1971's A Nod Is as Good as a Wink...To a Blind Horse, five of nine from 1971's Long Player (with an additional two in alternative versions) and three of ten from 1970's First Step (originally credited to Small Faces). Other vintage Faces tracks long sought after by collectors and completists had never been compiled before (such as the studio-recorded US-only single version of their take on Paul McCartney's "Maybe I'm Amazed", or the obscure dobro-driven B-side "Skewiff (Mend the Fuse)"). The song that opens this set, "Flying", is a subtly remixed version of the track which originally appeared on First Step. "Wyndlesham Bay" is an early version of one of Rod Stewart's 'solo' songs, "Jodie", with different lyrics (although as the credit on the record label of the single itself clearly attests, "Jodie" is itself a later Faces performance of this song, likely recorded at the same session as 'Poolhall Richard', that has since been incorrectly credited to Stewart as a solo artist).

Many tracks from BBC sessions also appear throughout, including Faces takes on Stewart's own "Maggie May" and "Gasoline Alley," the latter as part of a medley including "Around the Plynth." The Faces' earliest recordings are represented by rehearsal excerpts from the summer of 1969, including covers of Big Bill Broonzy's "I Feel So Good" (featuring Stewart on guitar and Ronnie Wood on harmonica) and Howlin' Wolf's "Evil."

The set was compiled by the group's keyboardist, Ian McLagan, who had previously compiled 1999's Good Boys... When They're Asleep, and his liner notes offer a unique and intimate take on the band's history alongside a fulsome tribute to late Faces founder member Ronnie Lane.

Five Guys Walk into a Bar... has received a largely positive response from critics since its release. Stephen Thomas Erlewine of AllMusic praised the box set as the best of its type: "There has never been a better box set than the Faces' Five Guys Walk into a Bar.... There has never been a box that captures an artist so perfectly, nor has a box set taken greater advantage of unreleased and rare material, to the point where it seems as essential and vital as the released recordings."

== Track listing ==
=== Disc 1 ===
1. "Flying" (Ronnie Lane, Rod Stewart and Ron Wood) [A]
2. "On the Beach" (Ronnie Lane and Ron Wood) [B]
3. "Too Bad" (Rod Stewart and Ron Wood) [C]
4. "If I'm on the Late Side" (Ronnie Lane and Rod Stewart) [D]
5. "Debris" (Ronnie Lane) [C]
6. "Jealous Guy" (John Lennon) [outtake from D]
7. "Evil" (W. Dixon) [Rehearsal, 1969]
8. "As Long as You Tell Him" (Rod Stewart and Ron Wood) [B-side single, 1974]
9. "Maggie May" (M. Quittenton and Rod Stewart) [Live/BBC, 1971]
10. "Cindy Incidentally" [Alternate Mix] (Ian McLagan, Rod Stewart and Ron Wood) [outtake from D]
11. "Maybe I'm Amazed" (Paul McCartney) [Live/BBC, 1971]
12. "Insurance" (Ronnie Lane and Ron Wood) [outtake from D]
13. "I Came Looking for You"+ (Ronnie Lane) [Rehearsal, 1971]
14. "Last Orders Please" (Ronnie Lane) [C]
15. "Wyndlesham Bay (Jodie)" (Ian McLagan, Rod Stewart and Ron Wood) [outtake from D]
16. "I Can Feel the Fire" (Ron Wood) [Live, 1975]
17. "Tonight's Number"++ (Ronnie Lane and Ron Wood) [from Mahoney's Last Stand, 1976][recorded in 1972]
18. "Come See Me Baby (The Cheater)" (Ian McLagan, Rod Stewart and Ron Wood) [outtake from D]

+ performed by Ronnie Lane and Ian McLagan
++ performed by Ronnie Lane and Ronnie Wood

=== Disc 2 ===
1. "Pool Hall Richard" (Rod Stewart and Ron Wood) [A-side single, 1973]
2. "You're My Girl (I Don't Want To Discuss It)" (Dick Cooper, Ernie Shelby, Beth Beatty) [Live/BBC, 1973]
3. "Glad and Sorry" (Ronnie Lane) [D]
4. "Shake, Shudder, Shiver" (Ronnie Lane and Ron Wood) [Rehearsal, 1969]
5. "Miss Judy's Farm" (Rod Stewart and Ron Wood) [Live/BBC, 1973]
6. "Richmond" (Ronnie Lane) [B]
7. "That's All You Need" (Rod Stewart and Ron Wood) [C]
8. "Rear Wheel Skid" (K. Jones, Ronnie Lane, Ian McLagan and Ron Wood) [B-side single, 1970]
9. "Maybe I'm Amazed" (Paul McCartney) [A-side single, 1971]
10. "(If Loving You Is Wrong) I Don't Want to Be Right" (Homer Banks, Carl Hampton and R. Jackson) [outtake from D]
11. "Take a Look at the Guy" (Ron Wood) [Live, 1975]
12. "Flags and Banners" (Ronnie Lane and Rod Stewart) [D]
13. "Bad 'N' Ruin" (Ian McLagan and Rod Stewart) [Live/BBC, 1971]
14. "Around the Plynth" (Rod Stewart and Ron Wood) [A]
15. "Sweet Lady Mary" (Ronnie Lane, Rod Stewart and Ron Wood) [B]
16. "Had Me a Real Good Time" (Ronnie Lane, Rod Stewart and Ron Wood) [B]
17. "Cut Across Shorty" (Marijohn Wilkin and Wayne Walker) [Live/BBC, 1971]

=== Disc 3 ===
1. "You're So Rude" (Ronnie Lane and Ian McLagan) [C]
2. "(I Know) I'm Losing You" (Cornelius Grant, Eddie Holland, Norman Whitfield) [Live/BBC, 1971]
3. "Love Lives Here" (Ronnie Lane, Rod Stewart and Ron Wood) [C]
4. "I'd Rather Go Blind" (Bill Foster, Ellington Jordan) [Live, 1975]
5. "Hi-Heel Sneakers" (Robert Higginbotham) / "Everybody Needs Somebody to Love" (Solomon Burke, Bert Berns, Jerry Wexler) [E]
6. "Gettin' Hungry" (Brian Wilson, Mike Love) [E]
7. "Silicone Grown" (Rod Stewart and Ron Wood) [D]
8. "Oh Lord I'm Browned Off" (K. Jones, Ronnie Lane, Ian McLagan and Ron Wood) [B-side single, 1971]
9. "Just Another Honky" (Ronnie Lane) [D]
10. "Open to Ideas" (Ian McLagan, Rod Stewart and Ron Wood) [E]
11. "Skewiff (Mend the Fuse)" (K. Jones, Ronnie Lane, Ian McLagan and Ron Wood) [B-side single, 1973]
12. "Too Bad" (Rod Stewart and Ron Wood) [Live, 1972]
13. "Rock Me" (Ian McLagan) [E]
14. "Angel" (Jimi Hendrix) [Live/BBC, 1973]
15. "Stay With Me" (Rod Stewart and Ron Wood) [Live/BBC, 1971]
16. "Ooh La La" (Ronnie Lane and Ron Wood) [D]

=== Disc 4 ===
1. "The Stealer" (Paul Rodgers, Andy Fraser, Paul Kossoff) [Live/BBC, 1973]
2. "Around the Plynth" (Rod Stewart and Ron Wood) / "Gasoline Alley" (Rod Stewart and Ron Wood) [Live/BBC, 1970]
3. "You Can Make Me Dance, Sing or Anything (Even Take the Dog for a Walk, Mend a Fuse, Fold Away the Ironing Board, or Any Other Domestic Shortcomings)" (K. Jones, Ian McLagan, Rod Stewart, Ron Wood and T. Yamauchi) [A-side single, 1974]
4. "I Wish It Would Rain" (Barrett Strong, Norman Whitfield, Roger Penzabene) [Live, 1973]
5. "Miss Judy's Farm" (Rod Stewart and Ron Wood) [Live/BBC, 1971]
6. "Love in Vain" (Robert Johnson) [Live/BBC, 1971]
7. "My Fault" (Ian McLagan, Rod Stewart and Ron Wood) [Live/BBC, 1973]
8. "I Feel So Good" (Big Bill Broonzy) [Rehearsal, 1969]
9. "Miss Judy's Farm" (Rod Stewart and Ron Wood) [C]
10. "Three Button Hand Me Down" (Ian McLagan and Rod Stewart) [A]
11. "Cindy Incidentally" (Ian McLagan, Rod Stewart and Ron Wood) [D]
12. "Borstal Boys" (Ian McLagan, Rod Stewart and Ron Wood) [D]
13. "Flying" (Ronnie Lane, Rod Stewart and Ron Wood) [Live/BBC, 1970]
14. "Bad 'N' Ruin" (Ian McLagan and Rod Stewart) [B]
15. "Dishevelment Blues" (K. Jones, Ronnie Lane, Ian McLagan, Rod Stewart and Ron Wood) [promotional flexi-disc, 1973]
16. "Stay With Me" (Rod Stewart and Ron Wood) [C]

=== Key ===
- [A]= First Step (March 1970)
- [B]= Long Player (February 1971)
- [C]= A Nod Is as Good as a Wink...To a Blind Horse (November 1971)
- [D]= Ooh La La (March 1973)
- [E]= The Faces' Last Sessions (January 1975)

== Personnel ==
- Kenney Jones – drums, percussion (June 1969 – December 1975)
- Ronnie Lane – bass, acoustic guitar, dobro, tambourine, secondary and occasional lead vocals (June 1969 – June 1973)
- Ian McLagan – organ, acoustic and electric pianos, harmonium, clavinet, backing vocals (June 1969 – December 1975)
- Rod Stewart – lead vocals, banjo, rhythm guitar on "Flags and Banners" and "I Feel So Good" (July 1969 – December 1975)
- Ronnie Wood – lead, acoustic, slide, and pedal steel guitars, bass, harmonica, electric bouzouki, vocals (June 1969 – December 1975)
- Tetsu Yamauchi – bass (August 1973 – December 1975)

Featuring:

- Harry Beckett and Bobby Keyes – horns on "Had Me A Real Good Time" and "Tonight's Number"
- Pete Townshend – guitar on "Tonight's Number"
