= Troublemaker (album) =

Studio album by Ian McLagan
- Released: 1979
- Recorded: 1978–79
- Studio: Cherokee, Hollywood; Shangri-La, Malibu, California
- Genre: Rock & roll, roots rock, hard rock
- Length: 35:11
- Label: Mercury
- Producer: Geoff Workman (1-2, 4-10), Ian McLagan (3)

Ian McLagan chronology
Troublemaker (1979)	Bump in the Night (1981)

Professional ratings
Review scores
Source	Rating
Allmusic	link
Christgau's Record Guide	B

Troublemaker is the debut album from former Small Faces and Faces keyboardist Ian McLagan, released in 1979 on Mercury Records.

Backed by a core group of Johnny Lee Schell (guitar and vocals), Paul Stallworth (bass) and Jim Keltner (drums), McLagan's rough-hewed voice and keyboards along with the party atmosphere permeating throughout the album - especially on the lead-off "La De Da" and Schell's donated "Little Troublemaker" - make the album a late part three to Ronnie Wood's albums I've Got My Own Album to Do (1974) and Now Look (1975), which had featured McLagan as core keyboardist. In the period Troublemaker was recorded, McLagan toured with The New Barbarians, and the other members of that band - Wood, Keith Richards, Bobby Keys, Stanley Clarke and Zigaboo Modeliste - are all featured on the reggae number "Truly".

The album, combined with McLagan's 1985 extended play Last Chance to Dance and some bonus tracks, has been re-issued under the title Here Comes Trouble on the Maniac Records label.

== Track listing ==
All tracks composed by Ian McLagan; except where indicated

1. "La De Da" (2:25)
2. "Headlines" (3:00)
3. "Truly" (Carl Levy) (5:58)
4. "Somebody" (2:58)
5. "Movin' Out" (3:52)
6. "Little Troublemaker" (Johnny Lee Schell) (2:26)
7. "If It's Alright" (2:00)
8. "Sign" (McLagan, Schell) (3:24)
9. "Hold On" (3:43)
10. "Mystifies Me" (Ron Wood) (5:25)

== Personnel ==
Troublemakers

- Ian McLagan - vocals, Wurlitzer electric piano, Hammond B3 organ, acoustic and electric guitars
- Johnny Lee Schell - electric and acoustic guitars, vocals
- Paul Stallworth - bass
- Jim Keltner - drums

with:

- Bobby Keys - tenor saxophone (3, 4, 5, 6, 10)
- Ronnie Wood - guitar, tenor saxophone, vocals (3, 4)
- Keith Richards - guitar, vocals (3)
- Stanley Clarke - bass (3)
- Zigaboo Modeliste - drums (3)
- Steve Madaio - trumpet (4)
- Ringo Starr - drums (9)
- Geoff Workman - accordion (9)
- Jaime Segal - vocals (10)

== Production ==
- Producer: Geoff Workman
- Engineer: Geoff Workman
- Associate Engineer: John Weaver

  - The information above can be found in the CD booklets of "Here Comes Trouble" and "I've Got My Own Album to Do".
