= Freedom (Sherbet song) =

Single by Sherbet

from the album In Concert
- B-side: "Wishing Well"
- Released: March 1975
- Recorded: Armstrong Studios, Festival Studios
- Genre: Rock
- Length: 3:23
- Label: Infinity; Festival
- Songwriters: Garth Porter; Clive Shakespeare
- Producers: Richard Batchens; Sherbet

Sherbet singles chronology
"Summer Love" (1975)	"Freedom" (1975)	"Life" (1975)

"Freedom" is a song by Australian rock band, Sherbet. It was released in March 1975 as the first and only single from the band's live album, In Concert, recorded live on Sherbet's Slipstream Tour. The song was written by Garth Porter and Clive Shakespeare.

== Track listing ==
No.	Title	Writer(s)	Length
1.	"Freedom"	Garth Porter, Clive Shakespeare	3:23
2.	"Wishing Well"	John Bundrick, Paul Kossoff, Paul Rodgers, Simon Kirke, Tetsu Yamauchi	3:41

== Personnel ==
- Daryl Braithwaite - lead vocals
- Tony Mitchell - bass, vocals
- Garth Porter - keyboards, vocals
- Alan Sandow - drums
- Clive Shakespeare - guitar, vocals

== Charts ==
Chart (1975)	Peak position
Australia (Kent Music Report)	52
