= Ooh La La (Faces song) =

1973 song by Faces

- West German picture sleeve

Single by Faces

from the album Ooh La La
- B-side: "Borstal Boys"
- Released: March 1973
- Recorded: January 1973
- Genre: Folk rock
- Length: 3:35
- Label: Warner Bros.
- Songwriters: Ronnie Lane; Ronnie Wood
- Producer: Glyn Johns

Faces singles chronology
"Cindy Incidentally" (1972)	"Ooh La La" (1973)	"Pool Hall Richard" (1973)

Official audio
- "Ooh La La" (2004 Remaster) on YouTube

"Ooh La La" is a 1973 song by the English rock band Faces, written by Ronnie Lane and Ronnie Wood. It is the title song of the band's last studio album, Ooh La La.

The lead vocals were provided by Wood, a rarity in the band's catalogue; lead vocals were usually performed by Rod Stewart and less often by Ronnie Lane. Stewart and Lane each recorded lead vocals for the song, but reportedly neither was satisfied by their attempt. Their producer Glyn Johns then suggested that Wood give it a try, and this version was used for the track on the album. Rod Stewart recorded a version of the song a quarter of a century later for his album When We Were the New Boys.

In 2021, it was listed at No. 246 on Rolling Stone magazine's list of the "500 Greatest Songs of All Time".

== Content ==
The lyrics describe a dialogue between a grandfather and grandson, with the elder man warning the younger about the perils of relationships with women: "Poor old granddad, I laughed at all his words / I thought he was a bitter man; he spoke of women's ways." The chorus laments, "I wish that I knew what I know now, when I was younger."

== Personnel ==
- Ronnie Wood – vocals, acoustic guitar, lead guitar
- Ronnie Lane – bass, rhythm guitar, tambourine
- Ian McLagan – piano, organ, Mellotron
- Kenney Jones – drums, maracas

== Releases ==
In addition to being the closing title track of the Faces' final studio album, the Faces version of the song appeared as a US single in May 1973. The first compilation on which the Faces version appeared was the album Snakes and Ladders / The Best of Faces. It appeared again on the 1999 Faces retrospective Good Boys... When They're Asleep and then also on the 2004 four-disc box set Five Guys Walk into a Bar.... It appeared on the Ronnie Wood greatest hits compilation Ronnie Wood Anthology: The Essential Crossexion, where Wood stated in the liner notes that he always thinks of Lane when he plays it.

== Certifications ==
Region	Certification	Certified units/sales
New Zealand (RMNZ)	Platinum	30,000^{‡}
United Kingdom (BPI)	Gold	400,000^{‡}
^{‡} Sales+streaming figures based on certification alone.

== Ronnie Lane versions ==
Lane recorded his own version with his new group Slim Chance soon after leaving Faces in 1973; it featured lyrics slightly altered from those he wrote for the Faces version. Although his studio version was never released during his lifetime, it appeared as the title track of the 2014 Slim Chance compilation Ooh La La: An Island Harvest. Lane regularly performed the song at concerts and on radio shows throughout his solo career until he retired from the music business in 1993, due to bad health.

== Rod Stewart version ==
"Ooh La La"

Single by Rod Stewart

from the album When We Were the New Boys
- Released: 18 May 1998
- Length: 4:15
- Label: Warner Bros.
- Songwriters: Ronnie Lane; Ronnie Wood
- Producer: Rod Stewart

Rod Stewart singles chronology
"Da Ya Think I'm Sexy?" (1997)	"Ooh La La" (1998)	"Cigarettes and Alcohol" (1998)

Music video
- "Ooh La La" on YouTube

British singer and songwriter Rod Stewart covered "Ooh La La" for his 18th studio album, When We Were the New Boys (1998), in tribute to the recently deceased Lane. It was released in May 1998, by Warner Bros., as the lead single from the album and became a top-20 hit in the UK as well as a top-40 hit in the US. The accompanying music video was directed by Randee St. Nicholas.

=== Charts ===
==== Weekly charts ====
Chart (1998)	Peak position
Canada Top Singles (RPM)	29
Canada Adult Contemporary (RPM)	1
Estonia (Eesti Top 20)	6
Europe (Eurochart Hot 100)	76
Germany (GfK)	73
Netherlands (Single Top 100)	92
Scottish Singles Sales (Official Charts)	8
UK Singles (Official Charts)	16
US Billboard Hot 100	39
US Adult Contemporary (Billboard)	3
US Adult Pop Airplay (Billboard)	32

==== Year-end charts ====
Chart (1998)	Position
Canada Adult Contemporary (RPM)	4
US Adult Contemporary (Billboard)	13
US Adult Top 40 (Billboard)	85

=== Release history ===
Region	Date	Format(s)	Label(s)	Ref.
Europe	11 May 1998	Radio	Warner Bros.	
United Kingdom	18 May 1998	CD; cassette	Warner Bros.	
United States	19 May 1998	Contemporary hit radio	Warner Bros.	
Japan	25 May 1998	CD	Warner Bros.	

== Other covers ==
Indie rock band Silkworm covered the song for their 2000 LP Lifestyle. In April 2012, the San Francisco rock band Counting Crows included a cover of the song on their album Underwater Sunshine. In late 2012, punk rocker Tim Armstrong, best known as front man of Rancid, recorded a ska-flavored cover of the song under the moniker Tim Timebomb and Friends. Included in the recording, and featured in the video, were drummer Travis Barker of Blink-182, bassist J Bonner, and keyboardist Kevin Bivona of The Transplants. American indie rock band Manchester Orchestra performed a version of the song in July 2013 for The A.V. Club's Undercover series.
