= Never Say Never (Ian McLagan album) =

Studio album by Ian "Mac" McLagan and the Bump Band
- Released: February 28, 2008
- Recorded: 2006–2007
- Studio: The Doghouse, Manor, Texas
- Genre: Rock and roll, roots rock
- Label: Maniac Records
- Producer: Ian McLagan

Ian "Mac" McLagan and the Bump Band chronology
Spiritual Boy (2006)	Never Say Never (2008)

Never Say Never a 2008 album by former Small Faces and Faces keyboardist Ian McLagan. It is McLagan's sixth full studio album. Never Say Never was released on February 28, 2008, on McLagan's own Maniac Records. McLagan had worked sporadically on the album since before recording and releasing Spiritual Boy, his tribute album to former bandmate Ronnie Lane, in 2006.

The album was rated four out of five stars by AllMusic.

== Track listing ==
All tracks composed by Ian McLagan

1. "Never Say Never" - 3:35
2. "A Little Black Number" - 3:13
3. "I Will Follow" - 3:54
4. "Where Angels Hide" - 3:34
5. "Killing Me With Love" - 2:53
6. "An Innocent Man" - 4:07
7. "My Irish Rose" - 4:25
8. "I'm Hot, You're Cool" - 3:20
9. "Loverman" - 2:12
10. "When The Crying is Over" - 3:43

== Personnel ==
- Ian McLagan - vocals, Wurlitzer electric piano, Hammond B3 organ, artwork, design
- "Scrappy" Jud Newcomb - guitar, vocals
- Mark Andes - bass, vocals
- Don Harvey - drums

with:

- Brian Standefer - cello (1)
- Patty Griffin - vocals (1, 8, 9, 10)
- Michael Ramos - trumpet (2)
- George Reiff - bass and ukulele (5)
- Michael Longoria - percussion (6, 7)
- The Tosca Strings - strings (10), arranged by Stephen Barber

Technical

- Glyn Johns - mixing, mastering
- Theresa DiMenno - cover photography
