= Rise & Shine (Ian McLagan album) =

Studio album by Ian "Mac" McLagan and the Bump Band
- Released: March 23, 2004
- Recorded: 2003
- Studios: The Doghouse, Manor, Texas
- Genres: Rock & roll, roots rock
- Length: 45:11
- Label: Sanctuary
- Producer: Ian McLagan

Ian "Mac" McLagan and the Bump Band chronology
Best of British (2000)	Rise & Shine (2004)	Here Comes Trouble (2005)

Professional ratings
Review scores
Source	Rating
Allmusic	4/5 stars

Rise & Shine is former Small Faces and Faces keyboardist Ian McLagan's fourth album, recorded by McLagan with his backing group, the Bump Band, featuring Gurf Morlix and "Scrappy" Jud Newcomb on guitars, Don Harvey on drums and George Reiff on bass. Recorded at McLagan's Manor, Texas studio, The Doghouse, it featured eleven tracks of original material, ten new and one overhauled from McLagan's 1985 EP, Last Chance to Dance. Featured on several tracks is Patty Griffin singing backing vocals.

== Track listing ==
All tracks composed by Ian McLagan

1. "You're My Girl" (2:41)
2. "Been a Long Time" (3:23)
3. "Date With an Angel" (4:32)
4. "Anytime" (5:07)
5. "Price of Love" (5:05)
6. "She Ain't My Girl" (4:08)
7. "Your Secret" (3:11)
8. "Lying" (3:56)
9. "The Wrong Direction" (3:33)
10. "Rubies in Her Hair" (4:17)
11. "Wishing Hoping Dreaming" (5:18)

== Personnel ==
=== The Bump Band ===
- Ian McLagan - vocals, acoustic and electric pianos, Hammond B2 and B3 organs, acoustic and electric guitars, bass guitar, percussion
- Gurf Morlix - electric guitars (right channel), vocals
- "Scrappy" Jud Newcomb - electric and acoustic guitars (left channel), vocals
- George Reiff - bass guitars, vocals
- Don Harvey - drums, percussion, occasional vocal

with:

- Patty Griffin - vocals (4, 8, 9, 11)
- Brian Standefer - cellos (4, 8)
- John Bush - congas, percussion (6, 11)

The Texacali Horns

- Joe Sublett - tenor saxophone (5)
- Darrell Leonard - trumpet (5)

== Additional sources ==
- Paste magazine review
- Popmatters review
- No Depression review
- The Austin Chronicle review
