= Bump in the Night (album) =

Studio album by Ian McLagan
- Released: January 1981
- Recorded: 1980
- Genre: Rock & roll, roots rock, hard rock
- Length: 33:31
- Label: Mercury
- Producer: Rob Fraboni

Ian McLagan chronology
Troublemaker (1979)	Bump in the Night (1981)	Last Chance to Dance (1985)

Professional ratings
Review scores
Source	Rating
AllMusic	4.5/5 stars

Bump in the Night is an album by former Small Faces and Faces keyboardist Ian McLagan, released in 1981 on Mercury Records. Retaining Johnny Lee Schell from his debut, the album saw McLagan form the first edition of The Bump Band for the recording of the album, the line-up being McLagan (vocal, keyboards, guitar), Schell (guitar, vocal), Ricky Fataar (drums, piano, percussion, bass, vocal) and Ray Ohara (bass). The album is harder-edged than McLagan's others, with less emphasis on keyboards and more on guitars. As on his debut, his former bandmate Ron Wood appears as does saxophonist Bobby Keys. The album was McLagan's last solo album for nearly twenty years, though an extended play, Last Chance to Dance, came out in 1985 on Barking Dog Records.

== Track listing ==
All tracks composed by Ian McLagan; except where indicated

1. "Little Girl" (McLagan, Ron Wood) (3:03)
2. "Alligator" (2:43)
3. "If It's Lovin' You Want" (McLagan, Johnny Lee Schell) (3:34)
4. "Casualty" (3:36)
5. "Told a Tale on You" (McLagan, Ricky Fataar, Ray Ohara, Schell) (3:07)
6. "Judy, Judy, Judy" (3:22)
7. "So Lucky" ( 3:18)
8. "Rebel Walk" (2:59)
9. "Not Running Away" (McLagan, Fataar, Rob Fraboni) (3:45)
10. "Boy's Gonna Get It" (3:57)

== Personnel ==
- Ian McLagan - lead vocals, organ, piano, guitars
- Johnny Lee Schell - lead guitar, vocals
- Ricky Fataar - drums, piano, bass, percussion, vocals
- Ray Ohara - bass

with

- Ron Wood - "duelling" guitar, bass (1)
- Renée Geyer - backing vocals (7)
- Bobby Keys - tenor saxophone (9)

Technical

- Tim Kramer - engineer
- Mike Doud - art direction, design
- Gary Panter - cover painting and illustrations
  - The information above can be found in the CD booklet of Bump in the Night, available from Maniac Records.
