= Kim McLagan =

British model

- Born: Maryse Elizabeth Patricia Kerrigan; 30 December 1948; Leicester, England
- Died: 2 August 2006 (aged 57); Manor, Texas, US
- Other names: Kim Kerrigan; Kim Moon
- Occupations: Model; beautician
- Spouses: Keith Moon (m. 1966; div. 1975) Ian McLagan (m. 1978)
- Children: 1

Kim McLagan (born Maryse Elizabeth Patricia Kerrigan; 30 December 1948 – 2 August 2006) was a British model during the 1960s. She was married to the Who's Keith Moon from 1966 to 1975, and to the Small Faces' and Faces' Ian McLagan from 1978 to her death.

== Early life ==
Kerrigan, known as "Patsy" during her youth, was born on 30 December 1948 in Leicester, but moved to Malaya (now Malaysia) at the age of three months when her father, Bill, started work managing a rubber and coconut plantation. She recalled spending most of her childhood being looked after by her nanny, and consequently learned to speak Malay at the same time as English. At the age of seven, she briefly spent time in England before living in Uganda and Tanganyika, both for two years each. By this time, her parents were concerned about her education, so she was enrolled in an Irish Catholic convent school in Bray, Wicklow. She had an unhappy experience there and attempted to run away on several occasions, before settling in Bournemouth at the end of 1963.

After starting work as a hairdresser, Kerrigan met Marie Fraser, who ran a modelling agency and school known as the Dawn Academy. At Fraser's urging, she joined the school, where she was persuaded to change her name from Patsy to avoid the perception that she might be attempting to "cash in" on the popularity of Pattie Boyd, a top model who Fraser thought Kerrigan strongly resembled. She decided on the name Kim.

== Keith Moon ==
It was through Kerrigan's work with the Dawn Academy that she was told about the Who, and was persuaded to see them at the local Bournemouth club, Le Disque a Go! Go!, where she met Keith Moon. She started dating Moon at the beginning of 1965. She believed that her father was the only person that Moon was ever intimidated by, adding that Moon was "very gregarious, very extrovert, he was a force to be reckoned with."

In late 1965, Kerrigan discovered she was pregnant with Moon's child. Consequently, she married Moon on 17 March 1966 at Brent Register Office, and their daughter Amanda ("Mandy") was born on 12 July. The marriage was turbulent; Moon denied he was married and a father to the music press on several occasions, insisted his wife end her modelling career while taking up modelling for Vidal Sassoon himself, and became violent and abusive towards her, particularly if she received passing comments about her attractiveness from strangers. On one occasion, Kerrigan hid in the bathroom while Moon attempted to cut the door down with a knife; on another, after she had met an agent from Paul Raymond and accepted his business card purely out of politeness, Moon lost his temper and attacked her. Despite this, Moon still said he loved his wife and would regularly send her love letters when on tour. In 1967 she appeared in the Beatles' "All You Need Is Love" video.

== Ian McLagan and later life ==
She left Moon in 1973, taking Mandy with her, after concluding his increasingly out-of-control behaviour could not be moderated. Shortly afterward she started a relationship with Ian McLagan, and divorced Moon in 1975, marrying McLagan on 9 October 1978, one month after Moon's death. The couple moved to Texas in 1994. McLagan worked for several years at a spa resort on Lake Austin before opening her own aromatherapy and cosmetics business.

McLagan was killed on 2 August 2006 in a traffic collision in Travis County, Texas, aged 57. Her car was hit by a truck and she was pronounced dead at the scene.
