= Best of British =

Best of British may refer to:

- Best of British (TV series), a British documentary series which aired 1987–1994
- The Best of British (radio), a BBC Radio 4 satirical commentary programme from 1988
- The Best of British, a 1977 album by Perry Como
- Best of British (Ian McLagan album), a 2000 album by the British keyboardist
- Best of British (magazine), a British nostalgia and heritage periodical
- The Best Of British, an annual radio show hosted on Radio X (United Kingdom)
- Best of British Oz - British Grocery and Confectionary store in Australia, located in Joondalup, Western Australia

== See also ==
- The Best of British £1 Notes, a 2005 compilation album by John Lydon (Johnny Rotten)
- Britain's Best Buildings
- Britain's Best Brain
- Britain's Best Dish
- Britain's Best Drives
- Britain's Best Sitcom
- Greatest Britons
