= Spiritual Boy =

Spiritual Boy: An Appreciation of Ronnie Lane

Studio album by Ian "Mac" McLagan and the Bump Band
- Released: 1 April 2006
- Recorded: February–March 2006
- Genre: Rock and roll, roots rock, boogie rock
- Length: 41:05
- Label: Maniac Records
- Producer: Ian McLagan

Ian "Mac" McLagan and the Bump Band chronology
Live (2006)	Spiritual Boy: An Appreciation of Ronnie Lane (2006)	Never Say Never (2008)

Spiritual Boy is the seventh album by former Small Faces and Faces keyboardist Ian McLagan. The album was intended as a tribute to his bandmate in both groups, singer-songwriter Ronnie Lane, released on what would have been Lane's sixtieth birthday, 1 April 2006, on McLagan's own Maniac Records. Featuring ten tracks either written or co-written by Lane throughout the span of his career as a musician and one written by McLagan for Lane, it was recorded in February and March 2006 at McLagan's Manor, Texas studio, The Doghouse, with his backing group, the Bump Band in tow alongside such guests as famed Austin, Texas disc jockey Jody Denberg.

== Track listing ==
1. "Spiritual Babe" (Ronnie Lane) 5:13
2. "Itchycoo Park" (Steve Marriott, Ronnie Lane) 3:57
3. "Nowhere to Run" (Ronnie Lane) 3:13
4. "Annie" (Ronnie Lane, Kate Lambert, Eric Clapton) 3:32
5. "Debris" (Ronnie Lane) 3:53
6. "April Fool" (Ronnie Lane) 4:22
7. "Kuschty Rye" (Ronnie Lane, Kate Lambert) 4:08
8. "Show Me the Way" (Steve Marriott, Ronnie Lane) 2:32
9. "You're So Rude" (Ian McLagan, Ronnie Lane) 3:18
10. "Glad and Sorry" (Ronnie Lane) 3:43
11. "Hello Old Friend" (Ian McLagan) 3:14

== Personnel ==
- Ian "Mac" McLagan - vocals, acoustic and electric pianos, Hammond B3 organs, clavinet, acoustic and electric guitars, Pro2 bass
- "Scrappy" Jud Newcomb - electric and acoustic guitars, mandolin, vocals
- Mark Andes - bass, vocals
- Don Harvey - drums

with

- John Bush - assorted percussion (1–3, 6–8)
- Seela Bush - vocals (1, 3)
- Jody Denberg - vocals (7)
- Brian Standefer - cello (5)
