= The Definitive Rock Collection =

The Definitive Rock Collection may refer to:

- The Definitive Rock Collection (Dokken album), 2006
- The Definitive Rock Collection (White Lion album), 2007
- The Definitive Rock Collection (Faces album), 2007
