= When We Were the New Boys =

Studio album by Rod Stewart
- Released: 25 May 1998
- Recorded: 1997
- Studios: Ollywood Studios (Hollywood); Royaltone Studios (Burbank, California); Ocean Way Recording (Hollywood); Le Mobile (Carlsbad, California); Beverly Park Studios (Los Angeles); Satinwood Studios and Record One (Sherman Oaks, California)
- Genres: Rock; pop rock
- Length: 41:51
- Label: Warner Bros.
- Producers: Rod Stewart; Kevin Savigar

Rod Stewart chronology
If We Fall in Love Tonight (1996)	When We Were the New Boys (1998)	Human (2001)

Professional ratings
Review scores
Source	Rating
AllMusic	3/5 stars
Entertainment Weekly	C
The Hartford Courant	(mixed)
People	(favourable)
Rolling Stone	3/5 stars

When We Were the New Boys is the eighteenth studio album by Rod Stewart, released on 25 May 1998. It was Stewart's last studio album to be released by Warner Bros. Records. It produced the singles "Ooh La La", "Rocks", and "When We Were the New Boys".

== Background ==
When We Were the New Boys was the first album by Stewart to not be released on vinyl. The tracks are mostly covers, such as "Cigarettes & Alcohol" by Oasis, "Rocks" by Primal Scream, "Hotel Chambermaid" by Graham Parker, and "Superstar" by the band Superstar. Two ballads were included that were suggested by Elvis Costello: Ron Sexmith's "Secret Heart" and Nick Lowe's "Shelly My Love".

The album also includes "Ooh La La", a song recorded by Stewart's previous band the Faces. The Faces' version of the song was originally sung by the band's guitarist Ronnie Wood; Stewart recorded the song for When We Were the New Boys as a tribute to the song's co-author, Faces bassist Ronnie Lane, who had died in 1997 a year before the album's release.

== Track listing ==
1. "Cigarettes and Alcohol" (Noel Gallagher) – 4:03
2. "Ooh La La" (Ronnie Wood, Ronnie Lane) – 4:15
3. "Rocks" (Bobby Gillespie, Andrew Innes, Robert Young) – 4:45
4. "Superstar" (Joseph McAlinden) – 4:21
5. "Secret Heart" (Ron Sexsmith) – 4:07
6. "Hotel Chambermaid" (Graham Parker) – 3:49
7. "Shelly My Love" (Nick Lowe) – 3:38
8. "When We Were the New Boys" (Rod Stewart, Kevin Savigar) – 4:39
9. "Weak" (Deborah Dyer, Martin Kent, Robbie France, Richard Lewis) – 4:38
10. "What Do You Want Me to Do?" (Mike Scott) – 3:36
11. "Careless With Our Love" (Rod Stewart) (bonus track on Japanese release) – 4:28

== Personnel ==
- Rod Stewart – lead vocals
- Kevin Savigar – horn arrangements (1, 3), accordion (2), Hammond organ (2, 5), keyboards (4, 7–10), bass (4), drum programming (7, 8)
- Jeff Paris – acoustic piano (6), backing vocals (6)
- Oliver Leiber – guitars (1–3, 6, 9), lead guitar (4), backing vocals (6), acoustic guitar (10)
- John Shanks – guitars (1–3, 6, 8, 9), electric mandolin (2), horn arrangements (3), acoustic guitar (4, 5, 7, 10), electric guitar (4), slide guitar (5), backing vocals (6), harmonica (10)
- Michael Landau – electric guitar (4, 7)
- Jeff Baxter – acoustic guitar (4), pedal steel guitar (4, 6), electric guitars (7)
- Lance Morrison – bass (1–3, 5–10)
- David Palmer – drums (1–4, 6–10)
- Paulinho da Costa – maracas (1, 3), percussion (7)
- Caroline Corr – bodhrán (2)
- Jimmy Roberts – tenor saxophone (1, 3)
- Nick Lane – trombone (1, 3)
- Rick Braun – trumpet (1, 3)
- Andrea Corr – penny whistle (2)
- Eric Rigler – low whistle (8)
- Sharon Corr – fiddle (2)
- Richard Greene – fiddle (6)
- Suzie Katayama – cello (9)
- Steve Richards – cello (9)
- Daniel Smith – cello (9)
- Sue Ann Carwell – backing vocals (1, 3, 5, 7), tambourine (3)
- Jacki Simley – backing vocals (1, 3, 5, 7)
- Richard Page – backing vocals (2)
- Will Wheaton – backing vocals (4)
- Dee Harvey – backing vocals (5, 7, 8)
- Lamont Van Hook – backing vocals (5, 7, 8)
- Fred White – backing vocals (5, 7, 8)
- Jeff Pescetto – backing vocals (6)

== Production ==
- Rob Dickins – executive producer, liner notes
- Rod Stewart – producer
- Kevin Savigar – co-producer
- Chris Lord-Alge – additional production, mixing at Image Recording Studios (Los Angeles, California)
- Barry Rudolph – engineer (1, 3–10)
- Steve Harrison – engineer (2, 9, 10)
- Charlie Bouis – engineer (4)
- Greg Collins – assistant engineer
- Jim Horetski – assistant engineer
- Allan Sanderson – assistant engineer
- Rafa Sardina – assistant engineer
- Jeff Thomas – assistant engineer
- Michael Dy – mix assistant
- Doug Sax – mastering at The Mastering Lab (Hollywood, California)
- Ed Fotheringham – artwork
- Lawrence Azerrad – art direction, design
- Ken Sharp – photography
- Annie Challis and Arnold Stiefel at Stiefel Entertainment – management

== Charts ==
=== Weekly charts ===
Chart (1998)	Peak position
Australian Albums (ARIA)	102
Austrian Albums (Ö3 Austria)	14
Canada Top Albums/CDs (RPM)	25
Estonian Albums (Eesti Top 10)	8
German Albums (Offizielle Top 100)	16
Scottish Albums (Official Charts)	1
Swedish Albums (Sverigetopplistan)	14
UK Albums (Official Charts)	2
US Billboard 200	44

=== Year-end charts ===
Chart (1998)	Position
UK Albums (OCC)	76

== Certifications and sales ==
Certifications and sales for When We Were The New Boys
Region	Certification	Certified units/sales
United Kingdom (BPI)	Gold	100,000^{^}
United States	—	285,000
^{^} Shipments figures based on certification alone.
