= Coast to Coast: Overture and Beginners =

Live album by Rod Stewart/Faces
- Released: 10 January 1974
- Recorded: 17 October 1973
- Venues: Anaheim Arena (Anaheim, California)
- Genres: Rock & roll, boogie rock, blues-rock
- Length: 49:48
- Labels: Mercury (U.S. LP version); Warner Bros. (U.S. cassettes/cartridges)
- Producer: Faces

Rod Stewart/Faces chronology
Ooh La La (1973)	Coast to Coast: Overture and Beginners (1974)	Snakes and Ladders / The Best of Faces (1976)

Professional ratings
Review scores
Source	Rating
AllMusic	2/5 stars
Christgau's Record Guide	C−

Coast to Coast: Overture and Beginners is a 1974 live album credited to Rod Stewart/Faces. Stewart's practice was not giving concerts as a solo act at the time, but rather appearing jointly with the Faces, thus the dual crediting.

== History ==
The album presents only three songs from the previous albums by the Faces, while presenting six from Stewart's solo releases. Two previously unreleased songs were a cover of "I Wish It Would Rain", originally recorded by The Temptations, and John Lennon's "Jealous Guy".

The performance was recorded with new Faces bassist Tetsu Yamauchi, replacing Ronnie Lane, who had left soon after the release of Ooh La La, fed up at the group increasingly being presented as Stewart's backing band. Coast to Coast was recorded live on 17 October 1973 at the Anaheim Convention Center and was mixed at Island Studios in London.

In an unusual arrangement, LP versions of the album were issued in the United States by Mercury Records (which at the time issued Stewart's solo albums), while cassette and 8-track configurations were issued by Warner Bros. Records, the Faces' former label—and with whom Stewart would sign as a solo artist following the Faces' demise.

The cassette and 8-track versions also include an extra track – "(I Know) I'm Losing You" (Norman Whitfield, Edward Holland, Jr., Cornelius Grant).

The back cover photo is actually the Old Boston Garden taken on May 2, 1973.

Long out of print in the United States, Coast to Coast is only available as an import from Japan. The Faces would disband within a year and a half of the album's release.

The crowd noise that plays behind the opening of David Bowie's Diamond Dogs was taken from the opening track "It's All Over Now". Stewart can be heard saying "Hey" on the Bowie track.

== Reception ==
In The Pittsburgh Press, critic Pete Bishop termed the album "50 disappointingly dull minutes" during which "nothing really excites".

== Track listing ==
Side one

1. "It's All Over Now" (Bobby Womack, Shirley Womack) – 4:38
2. "Cut Across Shorty" (Wayne Walker, Marijohn Wilkin) – 3:45
3. "Too Bad" / "Every Picture Tells a Story" (Rod Stewart, Ronnie Wood) – 7:34
4. "Angel" (Jimi Hendrix) – 4:28
5. "Stay With Me" (Stewart, Wood) – 4:50

Side two

1. "I Wish It Would Rain" (Roger Penzabene, Barrett Strong, Norman Whitfield) – 4:20
2. "I'd Rather Go Blind" (Billy Foster, Ellington Jordan) – 5:55
3. "Borstal Boys" (Ian McLagan, Stewart, Wood) / "Amazing Grace" (Traditional, arr. D. Throat) – 9:52
4. "Jealous Guy" (John Lennon) – 4:25

== Personnel ==
- Rod Stewart – lead vocals
- Ronnie Wood – guitars, backing vocals
- Ian McLagan – keyboards, backing vocals
- Tetsu Yamauchi – bass, trombone
- Kenney Jones – drums

== Production ==
- Faces – producer
- Gary Kellgren – engineer
- Tom Scott and Tom Fly – assistant engineers

== Charts ==
Chart (1974)	Peak position
Australian Albums (Kent Music Report)	38
Canada Top Albums/CDs (RPM)	51
UK Albums (Official Charts)	3
US Billboard 200	63

== Certifications ==
Region	Certification	Certified units/sales
United Kingdom (BPI)	Silver	60,000^{^}
^{^} Shipments figures based on certification alone.
