= Cindy Incidentally =

Single by Faces

from the album Ooh La La
- B-side: "Skewiff (Mend the Fuse)"
- Released: February 1973
- Genre: Blues rock, roots rock
- Length: 2:34
- Label: Warner Bros.
- Songwriter(s): Rod Stewart, Ronnie Wood, Ian McLagan
- Producer(s): Glyn Johns

Faces singles chronology
"Stay With Me" (1971)	"Cindy Incidentally" (1973)	"Pool Hall Richard" (1973)

Official audio
- "Cindy Incidentally" on YouTube

"Cindy Incidentally" is a song by the British group Faces, written by group members Rod Stewart, Ronnie Wood and Ian McLagan. It was produced by Glyn Johns. It was included on the band's 1973 album Ooh La La, and in the same year was released by Warner Bros. Records as the first single from that album.

It was the group's biggest hit in the UK, reaching number two on the UK chart in 1973 and staying on the chart for nine weeks. AllMusic describes the song as "one of their best". The song also was a moderate hit in the US on the Hot 100.

== Personnel ==
- Ronnie Lane – bass, rhythm guitar
- Ian McLagan – piano
- Kenney Jones – drums
- Rod Stewart – vocals
- Ronnie Wood – lead guitar

== Charts ==
Chart (1973)	Peak position
Australian (Kent Music Report)	53
UK Singles (The Official Charts Company)	2
Canada RPM	47
US Billboard Hot 100	48
