= Best of British (Ian McLagan album) =

Studio album by Ian "Mac" McLagan and The Bump Band
- Released: 7 March 2000
- Recorded: April to June 1998
- Studio: Resolution Studios, Sandymount, Dublin 4, Ireland; Leyline Studios, Chiswick
- Genre: Rock and roll, roots rock, boogie rock
- Length: 47:28 (Gadfly and Maniac), 52:05 (Dreamsville)
- Label: Gadfly Records (original); Maniac Records (re-release); Dreamsville Records (Japanese edition)
- Producer: Gurf Morlix

Ian "Mac" McLagan and The Bump Band chronology
Last Chance to Dance (1985)	Best of British (2000)	Rise & Shine (2004)

Professional ratings
Review scores
Source	Rating
AllMusic	3/5 stars
The Austin Chronicle	3.5/4 stars
The Encyclopedia of Popular Music	3/5 stars

Best of British is the third solo album by British keyboardist Ian McLagan. It was his first in nearly twenty years. Recorded in his adopted hometown of Austin, Texas, with his "Bump Band," then consisting of vocalist and keyboardist McLagan, drummer Don Harvey, bassist Sarah Brown, and guitarists Gurf Morlix and "Scrappy" Jud Newcomb, it featured twelve songs by McLagan, two previously released on his 1985 extended play, Last Chance to Dance.

The album was financed by his former bandmate, Ron Wood, who is featured on three tracks, including "She Stole It!" (the cautionary tale of a man, his woman and his record collection) and the ode to their departed Face Ronnie Lane, "Hello Old Friend." The album is dedicated to Lane.

== Critical reception ==
The Austin Chronicle called Best of British "an album of infectious yet personal tunes, permeated with the deep reflection of a man who's lived long enough to see a lot of life and death." AllMusic wrote that "Best of British is an enjoyable album that sounds like what it is -- a busman's holiday by a talented sideman."

== Track listing ==
All tracks composed by Ian McLagan; except where indicated

1. "Best of British" (3:47)
2. "I Only Wanna Be With You" (3:36)
3. "She Stole It!" (3:46)
4. "Warm Rain" (4:32)
5. "Hope Street" (McLagan, Jorge Calderón) (3:29)
6. "Hello Old Friend" (3:10)
7. "Big Love" (4:48)
8. "Don't Let Him Out of Your Sight" (5:25)
9. "Suzie Gotta Sweet Face" (3:35)
10. "Barking Dogs" (McLagan, Calderón) (3:56)
11. "I Will Follow" (3:51)
12. "This Time" (McLagan, Calderón) (3:33)
13. "Last Chance to Dance" (3:37) - bonus track on Dreamsville edition

== Personnel ==
- Ian McLagan - vocals, Hammond organ, piano, rhythm guitar
- Don Harvey - drums, percussion
- Sarah Brown - bass, backing vocals
- "Scrappy" Jud Newcomb - acoustic and electric guitar
- Gurf Morlix - electric guitar, backing vocals

with

- Ron Wood - acoustic guitar, slide guitar, vocals (3, 6, 12)
- Deborah Kelly - vocals (4, 7, 8, 12)
- Amy Boone - vocals (4, 8, 12)
- Billy Bragg - vocals (1)
- Akwana Nflembele & The Jumbahkum Singers - vocals (7)

Technical

- Stuart Sullivan - engineer
- Ron Wood - executive producer
