= The Wicked Messenger =

Song by Bob Dylan

from the album John Wesley Harding
- Released: December 27, 1967
- Recorded: November 29, 1967
- Studio: Columbia Studio A (Nashville, Tennessee)
- Genre: Folk rock; country rock
- Length: 2:02
- Label: Columbia
- Songwriter: Bob Dylan
- Producer: Bob Johnston

"The Wicked Messenger" is a song written and originally performed by Bob Dylan for his album John Wesley Harding. The song was recorded at Columbia's Studio A, Nashville, on November 29, 1967.

== Structure and instrumentation ==
The song's instrumentation is light, a characteristic shared with the rest of John Wesley Harding. It features a repetitive descending bass line that carries the song, and the most prominent instrument used is Bob Dylan's acoustic guitar.

== Lyrics ==
The lyrics have their origins in the Bible. In his book, Wicked Messenger: Bob Dylan and the 1960s, Mike Marqusee writes:

The song title appears to be derived from Proverbs 13:17: "A wicked messenger falleth into mischief: but a faithful ambassador is health.". [In the song] the character first appears in public, unbidden, as an obsessive[...] The wicked messenger is the artist, the prophet, the protest singer.

Dylan was studying the Bible at the time, and he used many biblical reference in the songs on the John Wesley Harding album. His mother, Beatty Zimmerman, revealed in an interview at this time:

In his house in Woodstock today, there's a huge Bible open on a stand in the middle of his study. Of all the books that crowd his house, overflow from his house, that Bible gets the most attention. He's continuously getting up and going over to refer to something.

The song revolves around a character, a "wicked messenger", who has been sent by Eli, a priest in the Books of Samuel. For the critic Andy Gill, "this eponymous messenger is, of course, Dylan himself, the bringer of harsh truths". The lyrics are somewhat opaque ("When questioned who had sent for him/He answered with his thumb/For his tongue it could not speak but only flatter"), and the song ends with a sardonic, slightly cryptic moral, "And he was told but these few words/Which opened up his heart/"If ye cannot bring good news, then don't bring any" perhaps a reference to 2 Samuel 4:10.

Gill's interpretation of the song is that the high priest Eli was one of the more intellectual figures in the Old Testament. To have been sent by Eli implies a reliance on intellect. Gill suggests that "perhaps Dylan felt he had valued rationality too highly over spirituality."

== Live performances ==
According to his website, Dylan performed the song more than 125 times in concert between its live debut in 1987 and its most recent performance in 2021.

== Cover versions ==
The song has been covered by over a dozen artists, notably Faces on their 1970 album First Step; Patti Smith on her 1996 album Gone Again; and The Black Keys for the I'm Not There soundtrack in 2007.
