= You Can Make Me Dance, Sing or Anything (Even Take the Dog for a Walk, Mend a Fuse, Fold Away the Ironing Board, or Any Other Domestic Shortcomings) =

1974 single by Faces

Single by Rod Stewart and the Faces
- B-side: "As Long as You Tell Him"
- Released: 15 November 1974
- Studio: Musicland (Munich, Germany); Olympic (London, England)
- Genre: Rock
- Length: 4:29
- Label: Warner Bros.
- Songwriters: Kenney Jones; Ian McLagan; Rod Stewart; Ron Wood; Tetsu Yamauchi

Rod Stewart and the Faces singles chronology
| "Pool Hall Richard" (1973) | "You Can Make Me Dance, Sing or Anything (Even Take the Dog for a Walk, Mend a Fuse, Fold Away the Ironing Board, or Any Other Domestic Shortcomings)" (1974) |

Official Audio
- "You Can Make Me Dance, Sing or Anything" on YouTube

"You Can Make Me Dance, Sing or Anything (Even Take the Dog for a Walk, Mend a Fuse, Fold Away the Ironing Board, or Any Other Domestic Shortcomings)" is the last official single released by British rock group Faces. Released in November 1974, it later appeared on their 1976 greatest hits album Snakes and Ladders / The Best of Faces. As hinted by the title, the song follows a man happy to be with his romantic partner: "And I end up crying, but listen / I can be a millionaire / Honey when you're standing there / You're so exciting / You can make me dance."

Released under the group title Rod Stewart and the Faces, the single reached number 12 on the UK Singles Chart over Christmas 1974. The song still holds the record for the longest song title to appear on the UK chart.

== Personnel ==
- Kenney Jones – drums
- Ian McLagan – piano, organ
- Rod Stewart – vocals
- Ronnie Wood – guitar, backing vocals
- Tetsu Yamauchi – bass

== Charts ==
| Chart (1974) | Peak position |
|---|---|
| Australian (Kent Music Report) | 100 |
| UK Singles (OCC) | 12 |
