= Ooh La La (Faces album) =

Studio album by Faces
- Released: March 1973
- Recorded: September 1972 – January 1973
- Studios: Olympic, London
- Genre: Rock and roll
- Length: 30:22
- Label: Warner Bros.
- Producer: Glyn Johns

Faces chronology
A Nod Is as Good as a Wink...To a Blind Horse (1971)	Ooh La La (1973)	Coast to Coast: Overture and Beginners (1974)

Singles from Ooh La La
- 1. "Cindy Incidentally" Released: February 1973; 2. "Ooh La La" Released: March 1973

Ooh La La is the fourth studio album by the English rock band Faces, released in March 1973. It reached number one in the UK Albums Chart in the week of 28 April 1973. The album was most recently reissued on CD in a remastered and expanded form on 28 August 2015, including early rehearsal takes of three of its tracks, as part of the 1970–1975: You Can Make Me Dance, Sing Or Anything... box set (along with the rest of the Faces catalogue of studio recordings). The box set's vinyl counterpart did not contain any bonus tracks, but it did replicate the original LP artwork and 'animated' cover.

== Background and recording ==
By the end of 1972, following the critical and commercial successes of his solo albums, singer Rod Stewart had become increasingly distanced from some of his Faces bandmates, who were frustrated that they had come to be perceived by the public (and even by some concert promoters) as little more than Stewart's backing band for live work. Stewart himself was reportedly distracted enough by his newfound stardom that he missed the first two weeks of recording sessions for the latest Faces album entirely. The rest of the band used the studio time to rehearse and record a plethora of instrumentals and backing tracks, including material that would eventually appear on Ronnie Lane and Ronnie Wood's side project Mahoney's Last Stand.

The production of the album would continue to be hampered by Stewart's apparent lack of commitment to the project, and as a result of this situation, Ooh La La was, according to Ian McLagan, "Ronnie [Lane]'s album". Lane embraced the opportunity to expand his songwriting role in the band, and his increased contribution set the tone of the album's quieter, more reflective second side.

Despite the difficult circumstances of the recording sessions, producer Glyn Johns held the group together, helping to placate internal tensions; his efforts enabled the Faces to record a focused, concise album in the manner of its predecessor, A Nod Is As Good As a Wink... to a Blind Horse (the band's first two albums were, by contrast, lengthier self-produced records). Once the recording of Ooh La La was completed, the album's credits optimistically suggested an intention to work with Johns again in the future, with the comment: "Produced by Glyn Johns (see you in a year)".

== Musical content ==
Stewart's compositions for the album were written mostly in tandem with Wood and McLagan, although – in a departure from the norm – two more songs were written by Stewart in sole partnership with Lane. One of these, "Flags and Banners", featured Stewart accompanying Wood on either banjo or a secondary guitar part, while Lane handled vocal duties.

The album included one composition by the whole band (excepting Stewart), the instrumental "Fly in the Ointment". This was the only joint composition by the four instrumentalists to make it onto any of their studio albums; usually their efforts were relegated to the B-sides of singles – such as "Skewiff (Mend the Fuse)", which served as B-side to the "Cindy Incidentally" single.

The title track, by Wood and Lane, featured the only solo lead vocal performed in the studio by Wood during the band's existence, recorded at Glyn Johns' suggestion after neither Lane nor Stewart were said to be satisfied with their own attempts at it. Lane later re-recorded the song and regularly performed it live during his own post-Faces solo career. Stewart apparently claimed at the time that the song was in the wrong key for him, but he also later covered the song on his 1998 album When We Were the New Boys, in tribute to the recently deceased Lane.

Two other tracks from the sessions were released at the time; "Skewiff (Mend the Fuse)" as the B-side of "Cindy Incidentally", and the blues parody "Dishevelment Blues" as the B-side of an album sampler flexi disc that was given away with copies of the New Musical Express to promote the LP. These two tracks (the latter long-prized by fans as a collector's item) were eventually compiled on the Five Guys Walk into a Bar... box set in 2004. Five outtakes from the album sessions were also released as part of Five Guys..., while a number of other outtakes, mostly instrumentals, have also circulated unofficially among collectors over the years.

== Album cover and artwork ==
The cover of the album was designed by Jim Ladwig, around a stylised photograph of "Gastone", a stage character of 1920s Italian comedian Ettore Petrolini. The original LP's Art Deco-inspired cover was constructed in such a way that when the top edge of the sleeve was pressed down, a concealed die-cut design element would descend that made Gastone's eyes appear to discolour and move to the side, and his jaw would appear to drop into a leering smile. The back cover also featured art deco-inspired design elements, and detailed song information and album credits alongside tinted individual photographic portraits of the band members. The original gatefold sleeve's inner design depicted a large stylised photomontage of the band in typical 'laddish' pose, admiring the charms of a can-can dancer (referencing the lyric of the title track).

The 2015 vinyl reissue (part of the 1970–1975: You Can Make Me Dance, Sing Or Anything... box set) replicated the original LP artwork, including the animated picture of Gastone.

== Subsequent events ==
Professional ratings
Review scores
Source	Rating
AllMusic	link
Christgau's Record Guide	B

Shortly after Ooh La La's March 1973 release, Stewart reported to the New Musical Express that he felt that the LP was a "stinking rotten album". He expounded further in the pages of Melody Maker, stating that the album was "A bloody mess. But I shouldn't say that, should I? Well, I should say it in a few weeks' time. Not now. I mean, the public ain't gonna like me saying it's a bloody mess. It was a disgrace. Maybe I'm too critical. But look, I don't like it ... All that fucking about taking nine months [sic] to do an album like 'Ooh La La' doesn't prove anything. But I'm not going to say anything more about it." Shortly afterwards, striking a rather more considered tone in an apparent attempt at damage limitation, Stewart told Rolling Stone magazine that what he had actually meant to say was that the group was "capable of doing a better album than we've done. I just don't think we've found the right studios, or the right formula".

Despite Stewart's misgivings, the album reached number one in the UK Albums Chart during April, knocking Led Zeppelin's Houses of the Holy off the top spot, and being the only Faces record to achieve that distinction. Rather than celebrate this success, however, the rest of the group was dismayed by the harshness of Stewart's comments, especially considering his perceived lack of commitment to fully participate in the album's recording. In his 2000 autobiography All the Rage, Ian McLagan wrote: "The week the album came out he did all he could to scuttle it and told anyone who would listen how useless it was".

Ronnie Lane, having assumed the creative workload due to Stewart's apparent lack of interest, was especially stung by the vocalist's public criticism. No longer content with the prospect of being increasingly sidelined in the band that he had originally co-founded, Lane left the Faces early in June, a decision that he would reportedly later regret. His role as bassist (but perhaps tellingly, not his role as secondary composer or vocalist) was filled shortly thereafter by former Free bassist Tetsu Yamauchi.

Faces released two further singles in 1973 and 1974, but while they toured extensively over the next two-and-a-half years, without Lane, the necessary impetus for the band to record another full album of studio material seemed to have evaporated (aside from a brief and abortive attempt early in 1975). The group eventually ground to a halt in November 1975 as Stewart seemed to lose interest in them entirely, while guitarist Ronnie Wood toured with the Rolling Stones before his official enlistment as Mick Taylor's replacement. For the remainder of the 1970s, Lane went on to a more creatively fulfilling but financially unrewarding solo career. At the same time, Jones and McLagan reunited with Steve Marriott in a reformation of the Small Faces (which also briefly included Lane at the initial sessions).

== Legacy ==
The album's title track "Ooh La La" is featured at the end of Wes Anderson's film Rushmore (1998), in the comedy film Without a Paddle (2004), and in numerous commercial and television soundtracks released since the year 2000. The song "Glad and Sorry" is featured in the films Blow (2001) and I'm Your Woman (2020)..

== Track listing ==
Side one

1. "Silicone Grown" (Rod Stewart, Ronnie Wood) – 3:05
2. "Cindy Incidentally" (Ian McLagan, Stewart, Wood) – 2:37
3. "Flags and Banners" (Ronnie Lane, Stewart) – 2:00 (lead singer: Ronnie Lane)
4. "My Fault" (McLagan, Stewart, Wood) – 3:05 (lead singers: Rod Stewart, Ronnie Wood)
5. "Borstal Boys" (McLagan, Stewart, Wood) – 2:52

Side two

1. "Fly in the Ointment" (instrumental) (Kenney Jones, Lane, McLagan, Wood) – 3:49
2. "If I'm on the Late Side" (Lane, Stewart) – 2:36
3. "Glad and Sorry" (Lane) – 3:04 (lead singers: Ronnie Lane, Ronnie Wood, Ian McLagan)
4. "Just Another Honky" (Lane) – 3:32
5. "Ooh La La" (Lane, Wood) – 3:30 (lead singer: Ronnie Wood)

2015 reissue bonus tracks

1. "Cindy Incidentally" [BBC Session] (McLagan, Stewart, Wood)
2. "Borstal Boys" [rehearsal] (McLagan, Stewart, Wood)
3. "Silicone Grown" [rehearsal] (Stewart, Wood)
4. "Glad and Sorry" [rehearsal] (Lane)
5. "Jealous Guy" [live at Reading Festival, Reading, UK, 25 August 1973, with Tetsu Yamauchi on bass] (John Lennon)

== Personnel ==
Track numbering refers to CD and digital releases of the album.

- Rod Stewart – lead vocals (tracks 1, 2, 4, 5, 7 and 9), banjo and secondary electric guitar (track 3)
- Ronnie Wood – lead electric, slide, acoustic and rhythm guitars, electric bouzouki; co-lead vocals (tracks 4 and 8), lead vocals (track 10)
- Ian McLagan – piano, organ, harmonium, backing vocals; co-lead vocals (track 8)
- Ronnie Lane – bass, rhythm and acoustic guitars, percussion, tambourine; lead vocals (tracks 3 and 8)
- Kenney Jones – drums, percussion

Notes: Stewart is credited with playing electric guitar only on track 3 in the Five Guys... booklet, so this credit may be in error (or may be the correction of an earlier omission). Due to his absences from the recording sessions for the album, during which the rest of the band recorded without him, and given that he performs no vocals or receives no other specific credits on the tracks in question, there is also some conjecture about Stewart's presence on tracks 6, 8 and 10.

- Neemoi "Speedy" Aquaye – congas, shakers, percussion (track 6)
- Glyn Johns – producer, engineer
- Ron Nevison – engineer, sound effects (track 5)

== Charts ==
Chart (1973)	Peak position
Australian Albums (Kent Music Report)	9
Canada Top Albums/CDs (RPM)	24
Norwegian Albums (VG-lista)	22
UK Albums (Official Charts)	1
US Billboard 200	21
