= Pool Hall Richard =

Single by Faces
- B-side: "I Wish It Would Rain"
- Released: December 1973
- Recorded: Morgan Studios, London
- Genre: Pop, rock
- Length: 4:20
- Label: Warner Bros.
- Songwriter(s): Rod Stewart, Ronnie Wood
- Producer(s): Mike Bobak, Ron Nevison

Faces singles chronology
"Cindy Incidentally" (1973)	"Pool Hall Richard" (1973)	"You Can Make Me Dance, Sing or Anything (Even Take the Dog for a Walk, Mend a Fuse, Fold Away the Ironing Board, or Any Other Domestic Shortcomings)" (1974)

Official Audio
- "Pool Hall Richard" (2010 Remaster) on YouTube

"Pool Hall Richard" is a song and single by British group, Faces and written by group members, Rod Stewart and Ronnie Wood. It was produced by Mike Bobak and Ron Nevison.

Despite appearing on the picture sleeve, Ronnie Lane does not appear on either side of the single, having quit the band in June 1973, before it was recorded in early July and released as a single that December. Instead, guitarist Ronnie Wood plays bass on the A-side, while Lane's permanent replacement Tetsu Yamauchi plays bass on the live B-side, recorded at the Reading Festival in August 1973. Yamauchi played his first live dates with the Faces in July 1973, but did not officially join the band until after "Pool Hall Richard" had been recorded.

== Release and chart performance ==
Chart (1973)	Peak position
Australian (Kent Music Report)	96

The single was released in the UK in 1973 on the Warner Brothers label with the Motown song "I Wish It Would Rain" as the B-side. It made number 8 in the UK chart in early January 1974, staying on the chart for 11 weeks.

== Reception ==
AllMusic critic, Stephen Thomas Erlewine, described the song as "a bar-room stomper".
