= Long Player (album) =

Studio album by Faces
- Released: February 1971
- Recorded: September 1970–January 1971 at Morgan Sound Studios, London and with The Rolling Stones Mobile Recording Unit, live tracks recorded 10 November 1970, at Fillmore East, NYC
- Genres: Blues rock; hard rock; country rock; boogie rock
- Length: 45:02
- Label: Warner Bros.
- Producer: Faces

Faces chronology
First Step (1970)	Long Player (1971)	A Nod Is As Good As a Wink... to a Blind Horse (1971)

Professional ratings
Review scores
Source	Rating
AllMusic	5/5 stars
Christgau's Record Guide	B
The Rolling Stone Album Guide	3/5 stars

Long Player is the second album by the British rock group Faces, released in February 1971. Two tracks, "Maybe I'm Amazed" and "I Feel So Good", were recorded live at the Fillmore East, New York City, on 10 November 1970.

== Background ==
A unique early mix of "Had Me a Real Good Time" appeared as a single ahead of the LP in November 1970, backed with the non-album instrumental "Rear Wheel Skid". While the latter track was eventually compiled to CD with the release of the Five Guys Walk into a Bar... box set of 2004, the different early mix of the A-side remains confined to the single and early vinyl editions of Snakes and Ladders / The Best of Faces in 1976.

A studio recording of "Maybe I'm Amazed" also appeared as the A-side of a standalone single release in the US just ahead of the album itself. This track and its non-LP instrumental B-side "Oh Lord, I'm Browned Off" were rarities among Faces collectors until they were both compiled on the Five Guys Walk into a Bar... box set.

Also recorded during this period was the band's cover of the Temptations' "(I Know) I'm Losing You" which later appeared on lead singer Rod Stewart's solo album Every Picture Tells a Story rather than on a Faces release. The band's performance on the track was acknowledged with a 'thank-you' from Stewart in the LP's liner notes. The track was then released as a single credited to Rod Stewart and the Faces, but only in the US. This practice led to increased murmurings of discontent in some quarters that Stewart's management was keeping the best Faces studio performances for Stewart's solo projects, to the detriment of the band as a unit.

== Legacy ==
On 28 August 2015, Long Player was reissued in a remastered and expanded form, including two previously unreleased outtakes, "Whole Lotta Woman" and "Sham-Mozzal" (the latter actually being an early instrumental prototype of "Had Me a Real Good Time"). Two more live tracks from the Fillmore East show were also included.

The reissue used the US cover artwork. It was also released at the same time as part of the complete recordings box set You Can Make Me Dance, Sing or Anything. The album's companion singles (aside from the unique mix of "Had Me a Real Good Time" as detailed above) were included in the box set on an exclusive CD of rarities.

== Track listing ==
Side one

1. "Bad 'n' Ruin" (Ian McLagan, Rod Stewart) – 5:30
2. "Tell Everyone" (Ronnie Lane) – 4:22
3. "Sweet Lady Mary" (Lane, Stewart, Ronnie Wood) – 5:40
4. "Richmond" (Lane) – 3:05 (lead vocals: Ronnie Lane)
5. "Maybe I'm Amazed" [Live at Fillmore East, New York 11/10/70] (Paul McCartney) – 5:35 (co-lead vocals: Rod Stewart, Ronnie Lane)

Side two

1. "Had Me a Real Good Time" (Lane, Stewart, Wood) – 5:50
2. "On the Beach" (Lane, Wood) – 4:15 (lead vocals: Ronnie Lane and Ron Wood)
3. "I Feel So Good" [Live at Fillmore East, New York 11/10/70] (Big Bill Broonzy) – 8:50
4. "Jerusalem" (instrumental) (Hubert Parry, William Blake – arr. Wood; erroneously credited as traditional) - 1:55

2015 reissue bonus tracks

1. "Whole Lotta Woman" (Marvin Rainwater)
2. "Tell Everyone" [Take 1] (Lane) (lead singer: Ronnie Lane)
3. "Sham-Mozzal" [embryonic instrumental version of "Had Me A Real Good Time"] (Jones, Lane, McLagan, Wood)
4. "Too Much Woman (For a Henpecked Man)" [Live at Fillmore East, New York 11/10/70] (Ike Turner)
5. "Love in Vain" [Live at Fillmore East, New York 11/10/70] (Robert Johnson)

Note: "Sweet Lady Mary" incorrectly listed as 5:30 on record sleeve.

== Personnel ==
Track numbering refers to CD and digital releases of the album.

- Rod Stewart - lead vocals
- Ronnie Lane - bass, acoustic guitar, percussion, backing vocals, lead vocal [tracks 4 & 7, first verse/harmony on track 5]
- Ronnie Wood - lead, slide, acoustic and pedal steel guitars, backing vocals, co-lead vocal [track 7]
- Ian McLagan - piano, organ and keyboards, backing vocals
- Kenney Jones - drums and percussion
- Bobby Keys - tenor saxophone on "Had Me a Real Good Time"
- Harry Beckett - trumpet on "Had Me a Real Good Time"
- Faces - production

== Charts ==
Chart (1971)	Peak position
Australian Albums (Kent Music Report)	18
Canada Top Albums/CDs (RPM)	34
UK Albums (Official Charts)	31
US Billboard 200	29

Chart (2026)	Peak position
Hungarian Physical Albums (MAHASZ)	33

== Other information ==
Track numbering refers to CD and digital releases of the album.

- Tracks 1 and 2 recorded with the Rolling Stones Mobile Studio. Engineered by Martin Birch.
- Tracks 3, 4, 6 and 9 recorded at Morgan Sound Studios, London. Engineered by Mike Bobak.
- Tracks 5 and 8 recorded live at Bill Graham's Fillmore East, New York. Engineered by Dave Palmer.
- Track 7 recorded with Revox spare room unit. Engineer unknown.

The album sleeve was originally a stitched-together facsimile of bootleg records as well as the old style 78 RPM singles, with the record label showing. The album was reissued in the mid 1970s as part of the double album 'Two Originals of The Faces' with record one being 'First Step'. Notes of dates for the live tracks use the US dating system - songs were performed and recorded on 10 November 1970.
