= A Nod Is As Good As a Wink... to a Blind Horse =

Studio album by Faces
- Released: 17 November 1971
- Recorded: March–September 1971 at Olympic Studios, London
- Length: 35:56
- Label: Warner Bros.
- Producers: Faces and Glyn Johns

Faces chronology
Long Player (1971)	A Nod Is As Good As a Wink... to a Blind Horse (1971)	Ooh La La (1973)

A Nod Is As Good As a Wink... to a Blind Horse, also released as A Nod's As Good As a Wink... to a Blind Horse, is the third album by British rock group Faces, and their second album of 1971. Bolstered by lead singer Rod Stewart's recent solo success with "Maggie May", it was their most successful album worldwide, peaking at No. 6 in the US, and reaching No. 2 in the UK. It also contains their biggest US hit, the swaggering "Stay with Me" (No. 6 in the UK, No. 17 in the US), and the album itself would be certified gold by the RIAA in 1972.

Thanks in no small part to the decision to share production duties with Glyn Johns, this album is generally regarded by critics and fans alike as the Faces' definitive statement; the most consistent, balanced album of the group's career in terms of songwriting, pacing and overall mood (Johns' association with the group's core members stretched back as far as their original iteration as the Small Faces). As a result of Johns' involvement, this album is a more focused and concise offering than the two previous Faces LPs, clocking in at just over 35 minutes where both of its predecessors exceeded the 45 minute mark.

The album features two original ballads and a cover of Chuck Berry's "Memphis Tennessee". Bassist Ronnie Lane, usually confined to backing vocals and the occasional sole lead vocal on previous Faces records, sings lead on three of his own compositions here (one co-written with keyboardist Ian McLagan). Of these, "Debris", an elliptical but emotional examination of father-son relationships, was chosen as the B-side to their hit "Stay With Me". (Lane's "You're So Rude" served as the B-side of the American release.)

== Release and reception ==
The original issue of the album came with a large poster. The poster included the lyrics for the album, as well as close-up images of pills and pharmaceutical capsules, and polaroid photos (apparently taken on tour) of band and crew members reveling with naked groupies in hotel rooms. Within weeks of release, the record company re-issued the album without the poster, turning original copies with the poster into collector's items overnight.

On 28 August 2015, the album was reissued in a remastered and expanded form, with the bonus tracks being two songs from a previously unreleased BBC session. The new vinyl reissue even replicated the poster included with the first-pressing vinyl release.

The album was included in the book 1001 Albums You Must Hear Before You Die.

Professional ratings
Review scores
Source	Rating
AllMusic	5/5 stars
Rolling Stone	mixed
The Village Voice	A−

== Track listing ==
Side one
No.	Title	Writer(s)	Lead vocals	Length
1.	"Miss Judy's Farm"	Rod Stewart; Ronnie Wood	Rod Stewart	3:38
2.	"You're So Rude"	Ronnie Lane; Ian McLagan	Ronnie Lane	3:41
3.	"Love Lives Here"	Lane; Stewart; Wood	Stewart	3:04
4.	"Last Orders Please"	Lane	Lane	2:33
5.	"Stay with Me"	Stewart; Wood	Stewart	4:37
Total length:				17:33

Side two
No.	Title	Writer(s)	Lead vocals	Length
1.	"Debris"	Lane	Lane (with Stewart on harmony vocal)	4:36
2.	"Memphis"	Chuck Berry	Stewart	5:29
3.	"Too Bad"	Stewart; Wood	Stewart (with Lane, McLagan and Wood backing)	3:12
4.	"That's All You Need"	Stewart; Wood	Stewart	5:06
Total length:				18:23

2015 reissue bonus tracks

1. "Miss Judy's Farm" [BBC Session] (Stewart, Wood)
2. "Stay With Me" [BBC Session] (Stewart, Wood)

== Personnel ==
Track numbering refers to CD and digital releases of the album.

- Rod Stewart – lead vocals on tracks 1, 3, 5 & 7–9
- Ronnie Lane – bass, acoustic guitar, percussion, lead vocals on tracks 2, 4 & 6, backing vocals on "Too Bad"
- Ronnie Wood – lead, slide, acoustic and pedal steel guitars, harmonica, backing vocals on "Too Bad"
- Ian McLagan – piano, organ, backing vocals on "Too Bad"
- Kenney Jones – drums, percussion
- Harry Fowler – steel drums on "That's All You Need"
- Glyn Johns – co-producer, engineer

== Charts ==
=== Weekly charts ===
Chart (1971–72)	Peak position
Australian Albums (Kent Music Report)	4
Canada Top Albums/CDs (RPM)	5
Dutch Albums (Album Top 100)	3
German Albums (Offizielle Top 100)	34
Norwegian Albums (VG-lista)	10
UK Albums (Official Charts)	2
US Billboard 200	6

Chart (2026)	Peak position
Hungarian Physical Albums (MAHASZ)	14

=== Year-end charts ===
Chart (1971)	Position
Dutch Albums (Album Top 100)	75

Chart (1972)	Position
Dutch Albums (Album Top 100)	20

== Certifications ==
Region	Certification	Certified units/sales
United Kingdom (BPI)	Gold	100,000^{^}
United States (RIAA)	Gold	500,000^{^}
^{^} Shipments figures based on certification alone.

== Reissues ==
Year	Label	Cat. number	Edition
2005	Audio Fidelity	AFZ 026	24 Karat Gold HDCD
