= First Step (Faces album) =

Studio album by Faces
- Released: 27 March 1970
- Recorded: December 1969 – January 1970
- Studios: De Lane Lea, London
- Genres: Blues rock, R&B
- Length: 46:22
- Label: Warner Bros.
- Producer: Faces

Faces chronology
First Step (1970)	Long Player (1971)

Singles from First Step
- 1. "Flying" / "Three Button Hand Me Down" Released: 1970; 2. "Around the Plynth" / "Wicked Messenger" Released: 1970 (US)

First Step is the debut studio album by the English rock band Faces, released on 27 March 1970 by Warner Bros. Records. The album was released only a few months after Faces had formed from the ashes of Small Faces (from which Ronnie Lane, Kenney Jones and Ian McLagan hailed) and The Jeff Beck Group (from which Rod Stewart and Ronnie Wood hailed). The album is credited to the Small Faces on all North American issues and reissues, while record labels for initial vinyl printings give the title as The First Step.

The album cover shows Ronnie Wood holding a copy of Geoffrey Sisley's seminal guitar tutorial First Step: How to Play the Guitar Plectrum Style.

While the album was recorded after the group's official formation and signing to Warner Bros. Records in the autumn of 1969, the band members had been rehearsing, performing and recording together in various combinations since May of that year.

At 46:22, First Step is the Faces' longest original release. Many modern critics view it was promising yet sprawling and unfocused---their least cohesive album. It is also the most evenly shared of their records in terms of songwriting, with each member receiving at least one composer credit, in contrast to the growing prominence of Stewart and Wood's partnership on later releases.

On 28 August 2015, the album was reissued in a remastered and expanded form, including two previously unreleased bonus tracks recorded shortly after the album's release, "Behind The Sun" and "Mona: The Blues" (the latter was remade and refined by Lane and Wood in 1972 for their Mahoney's Last Stand film soundtrack).

== Artwork ==
The photography for First Step was taken at Willoughby House, the home of artist Mike McInnerney and his wife Kate, who, like Lane, were followers of Meher Baba. During the shoot, Kate served the band punch spiked with methanol; McLagan recalled: "We ended up getting extremely drunk ... jumping up and down on this low table and smashing it to splinters." The front cover photo was taken by photographer and fellow Baba follower Martin Cook. It shows Wood holding a copy of the book First Step: How to Play the Guitar Plectrum Style, which biographer Terry Rawlings suggests is symbolic of the public perceiving him as only a bassist due to the Jeff Beck Group. McLagan and Lane are shown holding Mickey Mouse figures, of which McLagan said: "I don't remember bringing [them] along with us ... I get a feeling the doll must have been at Mike and Kate's house although Ronnie Lane is wearing a Mickey Mouse T-shirt so maybe they were his." The album's black-and-white gatefold photo was taken in the garden and shows the band pretending to play their instruments, except Lane, who was oblivious and instead has his hands in his pockets.

== Release and reception ==
Professional ratings
Review scores
Source	Rating
AllMusic	4/5 stars
Christgau's Record Guide	C+
MusicHound Rock	3/5 stars
The Rolling Stone Album Guide	3.5/5 stars
The Virgin Encyclopedia of Popular Music	3/5 stars

The single "Flying" / "Three Button Hand Me Down" was issued prior to the album's release. The band promoted it by appearing on the BBC TV shows Top of the Pops and Disco 2, but it still failed to chart. Lane said that the band "didn't really want to put out a single" and as such "didn't really care if it was a hit, but it would have been nice if it was." Released on 27 March 1970, (Note: The release date of 21 March 1970 is given by an article from Rhino Entertainment and the book The Small Faces & Other Stories by Uli Twelker and Roland Schmitt. Another article from Rhino, however, gives 27 March.) the album reached number 45 on the UK Official Albums Chart and number 119 on the Billboard Top LPs. Another single, an edited version of "Around the Plynth" backed with "Wicked Messenger", was released in the US, but also failed to chart. Stewart claimed that the album sold 250,000 copies within a month.

First Step received lukewarm reviews on release. Joel Selvin from Rolling Stone wrote that the album was "original" but also "highly derivative" and failed to live up to the expectations of Faces' lineup. New Musical Express described it as "weirdo sounds" and doubted if it would be accepted by Small Faces fans. Melody Maker wrote that the band kept Small Faces' appeal, but the album was nonetheless "rather patchy." A review from Billboard was more enthusiastic, proclaiming it to be "[t]he most together of any first album I've heard in a long time!"

Reviewing in Christgau's Record Guide: Rock Albums of the Seventies (1981), Robert Christgau viewed the album as "one more complication in the Rod Stewart mystery", saying: "With Jeff Beck he parodies himself before he's established a self to parody. With Lou Reizner he establishes himself as a singer-songwriter of uncommon spunk and a vocal interpreter of uncommon individuality. And here he steps into the shoes of a purveyor of Humble Pie to pose as the leader of a mediocre white r&b band. Best cut: Ronnie Lane's 'Stone.'"

== Track listing ==
All lead vocals by Rod Stewart except where indicated

Side one

1. "Wicked Messenger" (Bob Dylan) – 4:00
2. "Devotion" (Ronnie Lane) – 4:48 (lead vocals: Rod Stewart, Ronnie Lane)
3. "Shake, Shudder, Shiver" (Lane, Ronnie Wood) – 3:09 (lead vocals: Rod Stewart, Ronnie Lane) (duet)
4. "Stone" (Lane) – 5:33 (lead vocals: Ronnie Lane)
5. "Around the Plynth" (Rod Stewart, Wood) – 5:45

Side two

1. "Flying" (Lane, Stewart, Wood) – 4:10
2. "Pineapple and the Monkey" (instrumental) (Wood) – 4:23
3. "Nobody Knows" (Lane, Wood) – 4:05 (lead vocals: Rod Stewart, Ronnie Lane) (duet) – 4:04
4. "Looking Out the Window" (instrumental) (Kenney Jones, Ian McLagan) – 5:00
5. "Three Button Hand Me Down" (McLagan, Stewart) – 5:30

2015 reissue bonus tracks

1. "Behind the Sun" (Jones, Lane, McLagan, Stewart, Wood)
2. "Mona: The Blues" (instrumental) (Lane, Wood)
3. "Shake, Shudder, Shiver" [BBC Session] (Lane, Wood) (lead vocals: Rod Stewart, Ronnie Lane) (duet)
4. "Flying" [Take 3] (Lane, Stewart, Wood)
5. "Nobody Knows" [Take 2] (Lane, Wood)
- The 2015 reissue replicates the US edition of the LP, containing minor edits not present on the UK original, most noticeably the omission of Stewart shouting "That's yer lot!" at the end of "Around the Plynth".

== Personnel ==
- Rod Stewart – lead and backing vocals, banjo (track 4)
- Ronnie Lane – bass, rhythm and acoustic guitars, backing vocals, lead vocal (track 4), co-lead vocal (tracks 2, 3 & 8)
- Ronnie Wood – lead, rhythm and acoustic guitars, harmonica (track 4), second bass guitar (track 10), backing vocals
- Ian McLagan – Hammond organ, Wurlitzer electric and acoustic pianos, backing vocals
- Kenney Jones – drums and percussion
- Martin Birch – engineer
- Faces – producers

== Charts ==
Chart (1970)	Peak position
Canada Top Albums/CDs (RPM)	74
UK Albums (Official Charts)	45
US Billboard 200	119

== Bibliography ==
- Evans, Paul (1992). "The Faces". In DeCurtis, Anthony; Henke, James; George-Warren, Holly (eds.). The Rolling Stone Album Guide. New York, NY: Random House. pp. 236–237. ISBN 978-0-679-73729-2 – via the Internet Archive.
- Giuliano, Geoffrey (1994). Rod Stewart: Vagabond Heart. New York, NY: Carroll & Graf Publishers. ISBN 978-0-7867-0163-6.
- Larkin, Colin, ed. (2002). The Virgin Encyclopedia of Popular Music (4th ed.). London: Virgin Books. ISBN 978-1-85227-923-3 – via the Internet Archive.
- Neill, Andy (2016). Had Me a Real Good Time: Faces Before During and After (Updated ed.). London: Omnibus Press. ISBN 978-1-78305-995-9 – via the Internet Archive.
- Rawlings, Terry (2010). Rock on Wood: Ronnie Wood – The Origin of a Rock & Roll Face (2nd ed.). London: Acid Jazz Books. ISBN 978-0-9523935-2-8 – via the Internet Archive.
- Twelker, Uli; Schmitt, Roland (2011). The Small Faces & Other Stories (2nd ed.). London: Omnibus Press. ISBN 978-0-85712-451-7 – via Google Books.
- Yonke, David (1999). "The Faces/The Small Faces". In Graff, Gary; Durcholz, Daniel (eds.). MusicHound Rock: The Essential Album Guide (Second ed.). Farmington Hills, MI: Visible Ink Press. pp. 403–404. ISBN 978-1-57859-061-2 – via the Internet Archive.
