= Stay with Me (Faces song) =

Song by the band Faces

Single by Faces

from the album A Nod Is As Good As a Wink... to a Blind Horse
- B-side: "You're So Rude" (US); "Debris" (Intl.)
- Released: December 1971
- Genre: Rock and roll; boogie rock
- Length: 4:37
- Label: Warner Bros.
- Songwriters: Rod Stewart, Ronnie Wood
- Producers: Faces, Glyn Johns

Faces singles chronology
| "(I Know) I'm Losing You" (1971) | "Stay with Me" (1971) | "Cindy Incidentally" (1973) |

Alternative cover
- International single sleeve

Audio
- "Stay with Me" on YouTube

"Stay with Me" is a song by the English rock band Faces, written jointly by lead singer Rod Stewart and guitarist Ronnie Wood. Released from the band's third studio album A Nod Is As Good As a Wink... to a Blind Horse (1971), it became their only major hit in the United States, although they had a further three Top 20 singles in the UK chart. The song has also appeared on various Faces compilations and on albums by both songwriters. The lyrics describe a woman named Rita, who has a face that she has "nothing to laugh about", and with whom the singer proposes a one-night stand, on the condition that she be gone when he wakes up.

"Stay with Me" reached number 17 on the US Billboard Hot 100 and spent two weeks at number 10 on the Cash Box Top 100. The song also reached number 6 in the UK Singles Chart and number 4 in Canada.

== Re-recordings and cover versions ==
In 1993 Stewart, reunited with Wood for MTV Unplugged, recorded a live version of the song, which appears on the 1993 album Unplugged...and Seated (1993).

Def Leppard covered the song on Yeah! "Phil [Collen, guitarist] sang 'Stay with Me'," noted singer Joe Elliott. "It's his best Rod Stewart impression. I played the Fender Rhodes, he got to sing. There was a lot of instrument-swapping going on. Vivian [Campbell, guitarist] played some great Ronnie Wood slide guitar."

The band Train covered the song on their 2004 album Alive at Last.

In 2007, the song was covered by McFly as a b-side to their single "Do Ya" which was released for Children in Need.

In 2019, Mary J. Blige covered the song for the soundtrack of The Umbrella Academy.

== Personnel ==
- Rod Stewart – lead vocals
- Ronnie Wood – guitar, slide guitar
- Ian McLagan – Wurlitzer electronic piano
- Ronnie Lane – bass
- Kenney Jones – drums

== Charts ==
=== Weekly charts ===
| Chart (1971–1972) | Peak position |
|---|---|
| Australian (Kent Music Report) | 41 |
| Belgium | 18 |
| Canada RPM | 4 |
| Germany | 28 |
| Ireland (IRMA) | 11 |
| Netherlands | 4 |
| UK Singles Chart | 6 |
| US Billboard Hot 100 | 17 |
| US Cash Box Top 100 | 10 |

=== Year-end charts ===
| Chart (1972) | Rank |
|---|---|
| Canada | 73 |
| Netherlands | 47 |
| UK | 81 |

== Certifications ==
| Region | Certification | Certified units/sales |
|---|---|---|
| United Kingdom (BPI) | Silver | 200,000^{‡} |
^{‡} Sales+streaming figures based on certification alone.
