= Tetsu Yamauchi =

Japanese musician (1946–2025)

Tetsu Yamauchi 山内テツ
- Born: October 21, 1946; Fukuoka, Japan
- Died: December 4, 2025 (aged 79)
- Genres: Blues rock, free jazz
- Occupation: Musician
- Instrument: Bass
- Years active: 1967–1997, 2023–2025
- Formerly of: Kossoff, Kirke, Tetsu and Rabbit; Free; Faces; Creation

Tetsu Yamauchi (山内 テツ, Yamauchi Tetsu; October 21, 1946 – December 4, 2025) was a Japanese musician. In the 1970s, he was a member of several popular rock bands, including Free, where he replaced original bassist Andy Fraser before the band's final album Heartbreaker, and Faces, where he replaced Ronnie Lane and appears on the band's final single, "You Can Make Me Dance, Sing or Anything", as well as touring with them and playing on the live album Coast to Coast: Overture and Beginners. He also recorded various solo albums and did extensive work as a session musician before retiring from the music sometime in the late 1990s.

== Early life ==
Yamauchi was born Yamauchi Tetsuo (山内哲夫) in Fukuoka, Japan on October 21, 1946.

== Career ==
In the late 1960s, Yamauchi played with Mickey Curtis and his band Samurai. The Samurai had the legendary free-jazz drummer Sabu Toyozumi who performed and recorded with such free-jazz heavy-weight like Peter Brötzmann, John Zorn, Anthony Braxton, Toshinori Kondo, Leo Smith, the musicians of the Art Ensemble of Chicago and also Charlie Mingus. The Samurai toured Europe in Casinos, Rock venues and one 1970 Rock Festival in Rome, Italy. Samurai spent some time recording tracks for an album at Tangerine studios in Dalston, London. Also singing on this album was their manager, Mike Walker, who later wrote for the National Enquirer tabloid newspaper in the US. Two other members were named Hiro and Yujen, and harmonica was contributed by Graham Smith. The engineer was Tony Rockliff. This involvement led to him working as a session musician in both Tokyo and London. In London, he became close friends with Ginger Baker and Alan Merrill.

In 1972, he contributed to the album Kossoff, Kirke, Tetsu and Rabbit with Free guitarist Paul Kossoff and drummer Simon Kirke, together with keyboard player John "Rabbit" Bundrick. He subsequently joined Free to participate in their final 1973 studio album Heartbreaker, replacing Andy Fraser.

In August 1973, Yamauchi replaced Ronnie Lane in the Faces as their bass guitarist, but according to Faces keyboardist Ian McLagan, Yamauchi's recruitment turned out to be a mistake because he was not really the right type of bassist for them, and he had been hired to replace Lane in haste without the band properly auditioning him beforehand. Furthermore, McLagan stated that Yamauchi embraced a drinking and partying lifestyle when he, Rod Stewart, Ronnie Wood and Kenney Jones were now attempting to minimize their own significant drinking behaviour and become more creative. "We made a mistake really with Tetsu," said McLagan. "It wasn't his fault, but he was a party boy and thought he was in for lots of drinks and a little bit of playing, while we were looking for more creation and a lot less boozing."

According to Rod Stewart, Yamauchi was "a sweet Japanese guy who barely spoke English", and because of this communication barrier, his bandmates often found it difficult to understand how he was feeling.

Despite any misgivings some of his bandmates may have harboured about his compatibility, Yamauchi nevertheless remained a fully-contributing member of Faces for over two years — appearing on two single releases, the 1974 live album Coast to Coast: Overture and Beginners and participating in a number of global-scale stadium tours — and his association with the band only came to an end when the group itself dissolved at the end of 1975.

Following the breakup of Faces, Yamauchi recorded a solo album and continued working as a session musician.

In the late 1970s, Yamauchi returned to Japan, continuing to work as a session musician and tour and record with his own bands and with other artists. He retired from the music industry in the late 1990s.

== Personal life and death ==
In retirement, Yamauchi relocated to the countryside with his family to live a quiet life. According to his friend Alan Merrill, Yamauchi refused to speak to anyone from the press, living a "humble and very religious" lifestyle, and considering it "juvenile and vain" for people of his age to still be performing rock and roll; he refused any participation of any kind in anything to do with the Faces reunion.

Yamauchi died on December 4, 2025, at the age of 79.

== Discography ==
=== Solo ===
- Tetsu (1972)
- Kikyou (1976)
- Dare Devil (1992) with Peter Brötzmann, Shoji Hano, Haruhiko Gotsu
- Friends (1998), with Hiroshi Segawa, Ken Narita
- Tetsu & The Good Times Roll Band Live (2009). Recorded in 1976

=== with Samurai ===
- Samurai (1970)
- Kappa (1971)

=== With Kossoff, Kirke, Tetsu and Rabbit ===
- Kossoff, Kirke, Tetsu and Rabbit (1972)

=== with Free ===
- Heartbreaker (1973)

=== with the Faces ===
- Pool Hall Richard / I Wish It Would Rain (single, 1973) the live b-side of this single marks Yamauchi's first recorded appearance with the band.
- Coast to Coast: Overture and Beginners (live album, 1974)
- You Can Make Me Dance, Sing or Anything (single, 1974)
- Five Guys Walk into a Bar... (box set, 2004) He appears on numerous previously unreleased live and studio tracks from 1973 to 1975 on this collection.
