= Ian McLagan =

British keyboardist (1945–2014)

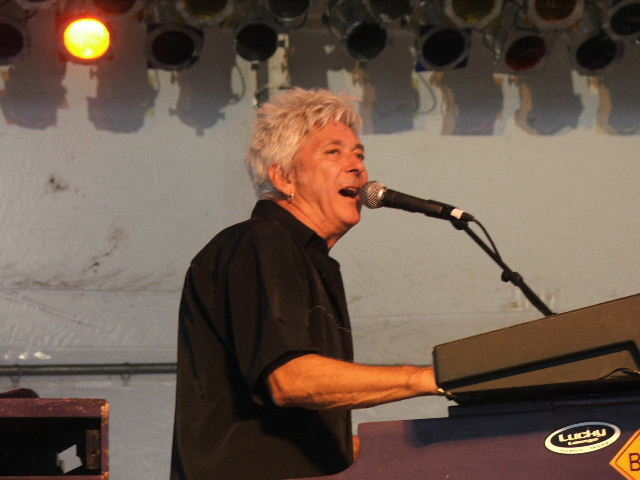
- McLagan performing with the Bump Band in 2006

Background information
- Born: Ian Patrick McLagan; 12 May 1945; Hounslow, Middlesex, England
- Died: 3 December 2014 (aged 69) Austin, Texas, US
- Genres: Rock and roll; rhythm and blues; hard rock; blues rock
- Occupations: Musician; songwriter
- Instruments: Keyboards; vocals; guitar
- Years active: 1960s–2014
- Spouses: Sandy Sarjeant (m. 1968; div. 1972) Kim Kerrigan (m. 1978; died 2006)
- Website: ianmclagan.com

Ian Patrick McLagan (/mək.ˈlæɡ.ən/; 12 May 1945 – 3 December 2014) was an English keyboardist, best known as a member of the rock bands Small Faces and Faces. He also collaborated with the Rolling Stones and led his own band from the late 1970s. He was inducted into the Rock and Roll Hall of Fame in 2012.

== Early life ==
McLagan was born at West Middlesex Hospital, Isleworth, to Alec William McLagan, of Scottish descent, and Susan (née Young), from Mountrath, County Laois. He had an elder brother, Mike. The McLagan family lived in Hounslow, West London. Alec McLagan was an enthusiastic amateur skater, having been British speed-skating champion in 1928; a photograph of him in this role features on the cover of his son's solo album, Best of British (2000).

He first started playing keyboards at the age of seven after his mother purchased an upright piano; one of his first appearances was in a group entitled 'the Blue Men' in which he played rhythm guitar. McLagan was educated at Spring Grove Grammar School, Isleworth, and the Twickenham College of Technology and School of Art. He quit his study of art to focus on music.

== Small Faces and Faces ==
McLagan first started playing in bands in the early 1960s, initially using the Hohner Cembalet before switching to the Hammond organ and Wurlitzer electric piano, as well as occasionally playing guitar. He was influenced by Cyril Davies' All Stars, and his first professional group was the Muleskinners, followed by the Boz People with future King Crimson and Bad Company member Boz Burrell. In 1965, he was hired, for the sum of £30 a week, to join Small Faces by their manager, Don Arden, replacing Jimmy Winston. McLagan played his debut gig with them at London's Lyceum Theatre on 2 November that year.

Once the 'probation' period ended, McLagan's pay was reduced (at his request) to £20 a week, which was what the other band members were getting. Don Arden managed the group's finances, paying them all a weekly salary until 1967 when payment was changed to royalties. With the band, he wrote and sang only two songs which are credited entirely to him, "Up the Wooden Hills to Bedfordshire" and "Long Agos and Worlds Apart", which appear on Small Faces and Ogdens' Nut Gone Flake respectively. However, he is also credited as a co-writer on several other tracks such as "Own Up Time", "Eddie's Dreaming" and "The Hungry Intruder".

In 1969, Steve Marriott left the group; Rod Stewart and Ronnie Wood joined, and the band changed its name to Faces.

== Work with other musicians ==
McLagan played piano on the studio side of the 1972 album The London Chuck Berry Sessions. After the Faces split up in 1975, McLagan worked as a sideman for the Rolling Stones, both in the studio (Some Girls including electric piano on "Miss You"), on tour and on various Ronnie Wood projects, including the New Barbarians. In addition, his session work has backed such artists as Arc Angels, Chuck Berry, Jackson Browne, Joe Cocker, Bob Dylan, James McMurtry, Melissa Etheridge, Bonnie Raitt, Sid Griffin, Paul Westerberg, Izzy Stradlin, John Hiatt, Frank Black, Nikki Sudden, John Mayer, Bruce Springsteen, Tony Scalzo, Carla Olson, Mick Taylor, and The Georgia Satellites. He played Hammond B3 organ on Mary Gauthier's 2005 album, Mercy Now.

McLagan played keyboards in the band that backed Bob Dylan on his 1984 joint European tour with Santana. Also playing in that band were Mick Taylor, Colin Allen and Gregg Sutton. He was a member of Billy Bragg's band "The Blokes" for several years in the late 1990s and early 2000s, co-writing and performing on the 2002 England, Half-English album and tour.

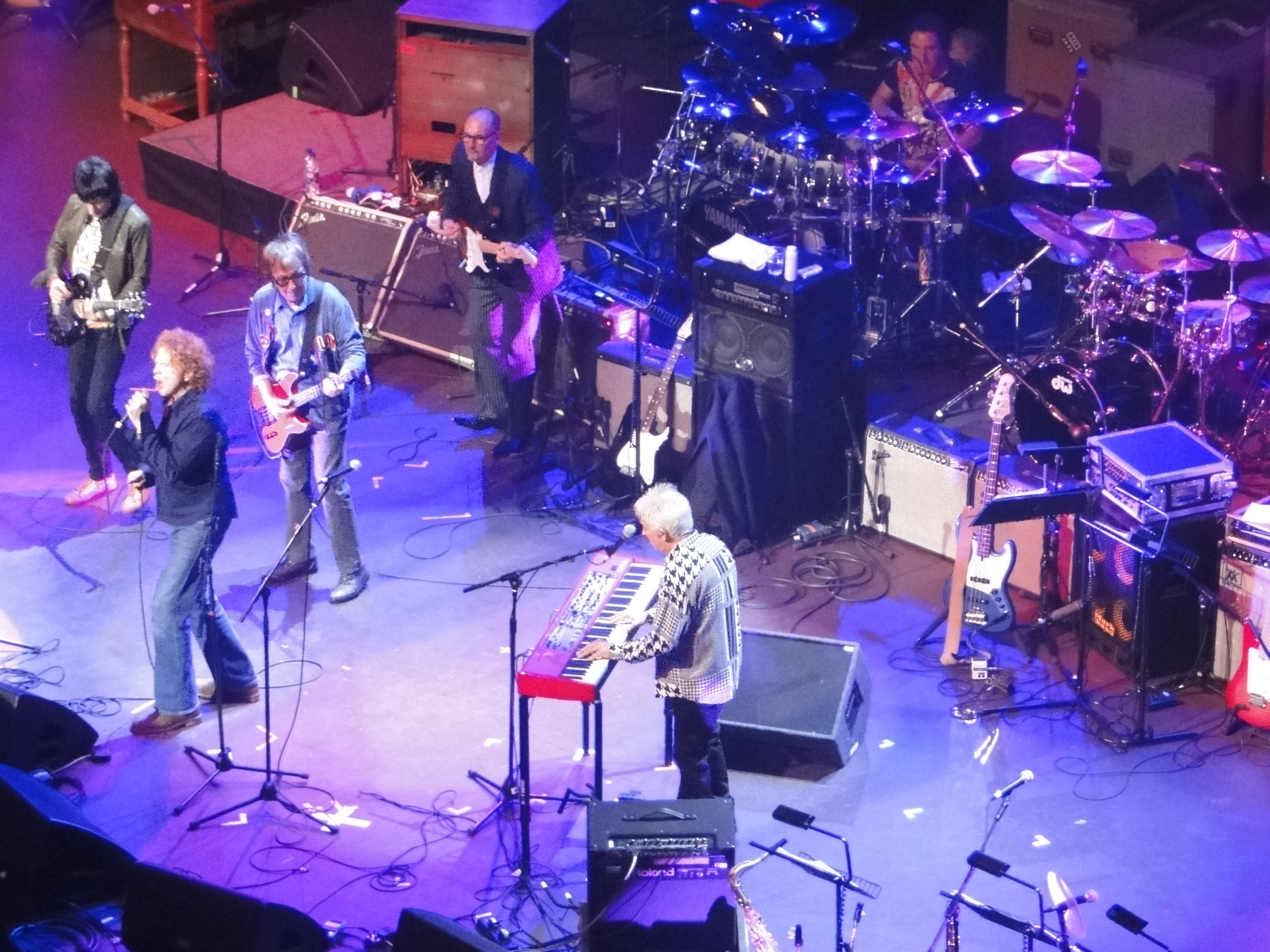
McLagan (front) with reunited Faces at the Royal Albert Hall, October 2009

In 2009, McLagan joined the James McMurtry band on tour in Europe. On 25 September 2010, at Stubbs in Austin, Texas, McLagan joined The Black Crowes on keyboards and vocals for their encore set. The set included two Faces songs, "You're So Rude" and "Glad and Sorry". In 2013, he appeared with the Warren Haynes band at the Moody Theater in Austin, Texas, playing piano on one number and organ on the other. In 2014, McLagan was a founding member of the Empty Hearts. The group recorded on 429 Records and McLagan's bandmates included Blondie drummer Clem Burke, the Chesterfield Kings' bassist Andy Babiuk, the Cars' guitarist Elliot Easton, and the Romantics' guitarist and vocalist Wally Palmar. The band's self-titled first album was released 5 August 2014 and produced by Ed Stasium.

McLagan is featured prominently on the Lucinda Williams double album Down Where the Spirit Meets the Bone, which was released 30 September 2014 on her own label, Highway 20 Records. He also features prominently on Scunthorpe duo Ruen Brothers' debut album All My Shades Of Blue, released 1 June 2018 via Ramseur Records. McLagan recorded his parts shortly before his death. It was produced by Rick Rubin. Other notable musicians on the album were Chad Smith from the Red Hot Chili Peppers and Dave Keuning from the Killers.

The band Drivin' N Cryin' released a tribute to Ian Mclagan on their 2019 album Live The Love Beautiful with a song entitled "Ian Mclagan".

McLagan appeared in the 2012 film This is 40 performing with Ryan Adams

== Bump Band ==
McLagan also released several solo albums. An in-demand player, he filled the role of bandleader with his own Bump Band from 1977 onwards. Towards the end of his life, he relocated to Austin, Texas and did gig nights at local clubs and bars. Ian McLagan & the Bump Band played at the 2006 Austin City Limits Music Festival, and opened for the Rolling Stones in Austin, Texas, in 2006.

== Personal life ==
McLagan was married from 1968 to 1972 to Sandy Sarjeant, a dancer on the television show Ready Steady Go!, with whom he had a son.

McLagan then began a relationship with Kim Kerrigan, the estranged wife of Keith Moon, drummer of the Who. She divorced Moon and she and her daughter from her marriage to Moon moved in with McLagan. McLagan and Kerrigan were married in 1978, one month after Moon died at the age of 32. Kim McLagan died in a traffic accident near the couple's home in Austin, Texas, US on 2 August 2006, aged 57.

McLagan published an autobiography, All the Rage: A Riotous Romp Through Rock & Roll History, in 2000. A revised version, with new material, was published in 2013.

== Death ==
McLagan died of a stroke on 3 December 2014, aged 69, at University Medical Center Brackenridge in Austin.

== Discography ==
Solo:

- Troublemaker (Mercury, 1979)
- Bump in the Night (Mercury, 1980)
- Last Chance to Dance (EP) (Barking Dog, 1985)
- Best of British (Maniac, 2000)
- Rise & Shine (Maniac, 2004) (Gaff Music)
- Here Comes Trouble (Maniac, 2005)
- Live (Maniac, 2006)
- Spiritual Boy (Maniac, 2006)
- Never Say Never (Maniac, 2008) (00:02:59 Records)
- United States (Maniac, 2014) (Yep Roc Records)

With Small Faces:

Studio albums

- Small Faces (1966)
- Small Faces / There Are But Four Small Faces (1967)
- Ogdens' Nut Gone Flake (1968)
- Playmates (1977)
- 78 in the Shade (1978)

Compilations

- From the Beginning (1967)
- The Autumn Stone (1969)

With Faces:

- First Step (1970)
- Long Player (1971)
- A Nod Is As Good As a Wink... to a Blind Horse (1971)
- Ooh La La (1973)

With Michael Monroe and Steve Stevens:

- Jerusalem Slim (1992)
