= Faces (band) =

English rock band

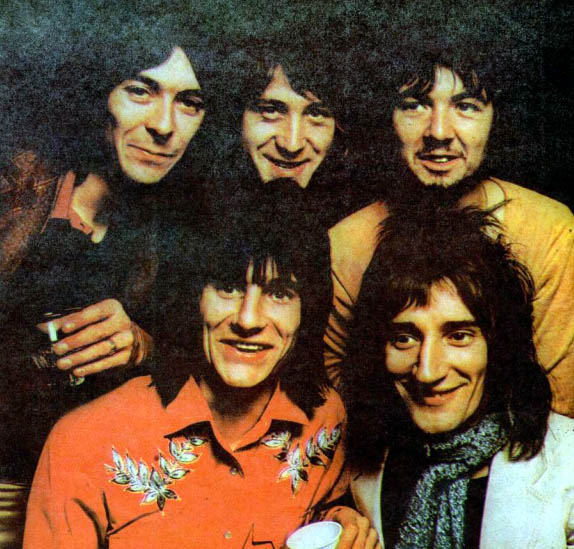
- Faces in 1971

Background information
- Origin: London, England
- Genres: Rock; blues
- Years active: 1969–1975; 2009–2011; 2021–present (partial reunions: 1986, 1993, 2012, 2015, 2019, 2020)
- Labels: Warner Bros.; Mercury
- Spinoff of: Small Faces
- Members: Kenney Jones; Rod Stewart; Ronnie Wood
- Past members: Ronnie Lane; Ian McLagan; Tetsu Yamauchi; Jesse Ed Davis; Mick Hucknall; Glen Matlock
- Website: faces.com

Faces are an English rock band formed in London in 1969. They formed after Small Faces lead singer and guitarist Steve Marriott left to form Humble Pie, and the remaining Small Faces—bassist Ronnie Lane, drummer Kenney Jones, and keyboardist Ian McLagan—recruited lead singer Rod Stewart and guitarist Ronnie Wood, both formerly of the Jeff Beck Group, and shortened the band's name to Faces.

Their first two albums, First Step (1970) and Long Player (1971), were modest successes, while their third album, A Nod Is As Good As a Wink... to a Blind Horse (1971), bolstered by the success of Stewart's parallel solo career, became a worldwide hit, peaking at number 2 in the UK and number 6 in the US, and spawning a hit single with "Stay with Me". After releasing their fourth and final studio album Ooh La La (1973), Lane was replaced by Tetsu Yamauchi on bass. This line-up released two non-album singles—"Pool Hall Richard" (1973) and "You Can Make Me Dance, Sing or Anything" (1974)—and a live album, Coast to Coast: Overture and Beginners (1973), before the band officially split in 1975, with a greatest hits album, Snakes and Ladders / The Best of Faces, appearing the following year.

Stewart continued his successful solo career, while Wood joined the Rolling Stones. Following a short-lived Small Faces reunion, Jones joined the Who in 1978, while McLagan went on to work as a session and touring musician with a number of acts (including his own bands) throughout the 1970s until his death in 2014. Lane's activities in the music business were severely curtailed by 1980 due to the onset of multiple sclerosis, which forced his eventual retirement by the early 1990s. He died in 1997.

A number of partial reunions of the Faces were rumoured throughout the 2000s, with various one-off performances involving surviving members occurring. In 2010–2011, a brief reunion tour occurred with Mick Hucknall and Glen Matlock on vocals and bass respectively. The Faces and Small Faces were jointly inducted into the Rock and Roll Hall of Fame in 2012. Stewart was scheduled to perform with the rest of the band, but was unable to do so at the last minute due to illness; he was replaced by Hucknall. Since 2021, Jones, Stewart, and Wood have periodically reunited to record tracks for a new album under the Faces name.

== History ==
The first collaboration among the future Faces was in a formation called Quiet Melon, which also featured Wood's older brother Art Wood and Kim Gardner; they recorded four songs and played a few shows in May 1969, during a break in Ronnie Wood's and Rod Stewart's commitments with The Jeff Beck Group. Later that summer Wood and Stewart parted ways with Beck and joined Lane, McLagan and Jones full-time. Prior to any releases by the new Faces line-up, Wood and McLagan appeared on Stewart's first solo album in 1969, An Old Raincoat Won't Ever Let You Down (known as The Rod Stewart Album in the US). The rest of the backing band on the album included drummer Micky Waller, keyboardist Keith Emerson and guitarists Martin Pugh (of Steamhammer, and later Armageddon and 7th Order) and Martin Quittenton (also from Steamhammer).

With the addition of Wood and Stewart, the "small" part of the original band name was dropped, partly because the two newcomers (at 5'9" and 5'10" respectively) were significantly taller than the three former Small Faces. Hoping to capitalise on the Small Faces' earlier success, record company executives wanted the band to keep their old name, however, the band objected, arguing the personnel changes resulted in a group very different from the Small Faces. As a compromise, in the US their debut album was credited to the Small Faces, while subsequent albums appeared under their new name.

The group regularly toured Britain, Europe and the USA from 1970 to 1975, and were among the top-grossing live acts in that period; in 1974 their touring also encompassed Australia, New Zealand and Japan. They toured the United States and Canada in 1975. Among their most successful songs were "Had Me a Real Good Time", their breakthrough UK hit "Stay with Me", "Cindy Incidentally" and "Pool Hall Richard". As Rod Stewart's solo career became more successful, the band became overshadowed by their lead singer. A disillusioned Ronnie Lane left the band in 1973; one reason given later for his departure was frustration over not having more opportunities to sing lead vocals.

Lane's role as bassist was taken over by Tetsu Yamauchi (who had replaced Andy Fraser in Free). Released just months before Lane left the band, the Faces' final studio album was Ooh La La.

The following year a live album was released, entitled Coast to Coast: Overture and Beginners; it was criticised by reviewers for being poorly recorded and thought out. It featured selections from their late 1973 tour, the first featuring Yamauchi. They recorded a few tracks for another studio album, but had lost enthusiasm and their final release as a group was the late 1974 UK Top 20 hit "You Can Make Me Dance, Sing or Anything". In 1975 Wood began working with the Rolling Stones, which brought differences between Stewart and the others to a head, and after a troubled fall US tour (with Jesse Ed Davis on rhythm guitar), in December the band announced that they were splitting.

=== Post-Faces ===
The members have had varied post-band careers. Rod Stewart's solo career continues to be extremely successful. Ron Wood joined the Rolling Stones permanently and remains with them to this day, while also enjoying a parallel career as a portrait artist. Within months of leaving the band in 1973, Ronnie Lane formed Slim Chance and immediately scored a UK hit single with "How Come?", but this early success was soon compromised by a subsequent self-organised UK tour that ended in financial disaster. Nonetheless, three Slim Chance albums followed on Island Records between 1974 and 76, and in 1977 he also worked on Rough Mix. a joint album with Who guitarist Pete Townshend. During this time Lane was diagnosed with multiple sclerosis, and after a final album in 1979 his solo career came to a premature end as his illness set in. Kenney Jones turned to session work and later joined the Who following the death of Keith Moon. Ian McLagan stated in a 2004 interview that Pete Townshend also asked him to join the Who, but he had already promised Keith Richards that he would tour as a Rolling Stones sideman. McLagan moved to the United States, where he formed Ian McLagan & the Bump Band. Tetsu Yamauchi returned to his native Japan, where he recorded and toured as a jazz musician. He is now retired from music.

There was also a Small Faces reunion in the late 1970s (without Ronnie Lane) that resulted in two albums; and in 1981 Ronnie Lane and Steve Marriott collaborated on the album The Legendary Majik Mijits.

The Faces reformed for the encore of Rod Stewart's Wembley Stadium concert in 1986. Ronnie Lane, by then seriously debilitated by multiple sclerosis, appeared on stage in a wheelchair. He sang, but was unable to play bass and Bill Wyman of the Rolling Stones filled in for him. The same line-up (minus Lane) reunited once more in 1993 when Rod Stewart was awarded the Lifetime Achievement award at the Brit Awards. Ronnie Lane made one of his final concert appearances in 1992 at a Ronnie Wood show with Ian McLagan on keyboards; the progression of Lane's multiple sclerosis finally forced his retirement from music by the mid-1990s and he died in 1997.

In February 1993 Rod Stewart and Ron Wood appeared together on a studio soundstage before a live audience in Los Angeles to record an episode of MTV's Unplugged series airing the following May; an album with excerpts from the performance, Unplugged...and Seated—including several Faces songs—was subsequently released on CD to considerable acclaim.

In 2004 a 4-disc Faces box set entitled Five Guys Walk into a Bar... was released by Rhino Records, featuring many of the band's most popular tracks as well as several previously unreleased songs. Drummer Kenney Jones formed a group called the Jones Gang, together with singer Robert Hart (formerly of Bad Company), Patrick Walford and bassist Rick Wills (formerly of Foreigner).

During 2004 and early 2005 the surviving Faces had several near-reunions, none of which featured more than three members at the same time: In May 2004 Kenney Jones and Ronnie Wood joined Ian McLagan on stage at his concert at The Mean Fiddler in London. In August 2004 Wood and McLagan joined Stewart at the Hollywood Bowl; Wood also appeared at several other of Stewart's 2004 gigs, including New York's Madison Square Garden, the Royal Albert Hall and a street performance in London for an audience of 80,000. In March 2005 McLagan joined Ronnie Wood's band at a London show, which also featured Kenney Jones on drums for the final encore; and in December 2005 Wood joined Ian McLagan & the Bump Band for three numbers at a concert in Houston, Texas.

=== Reunion ===
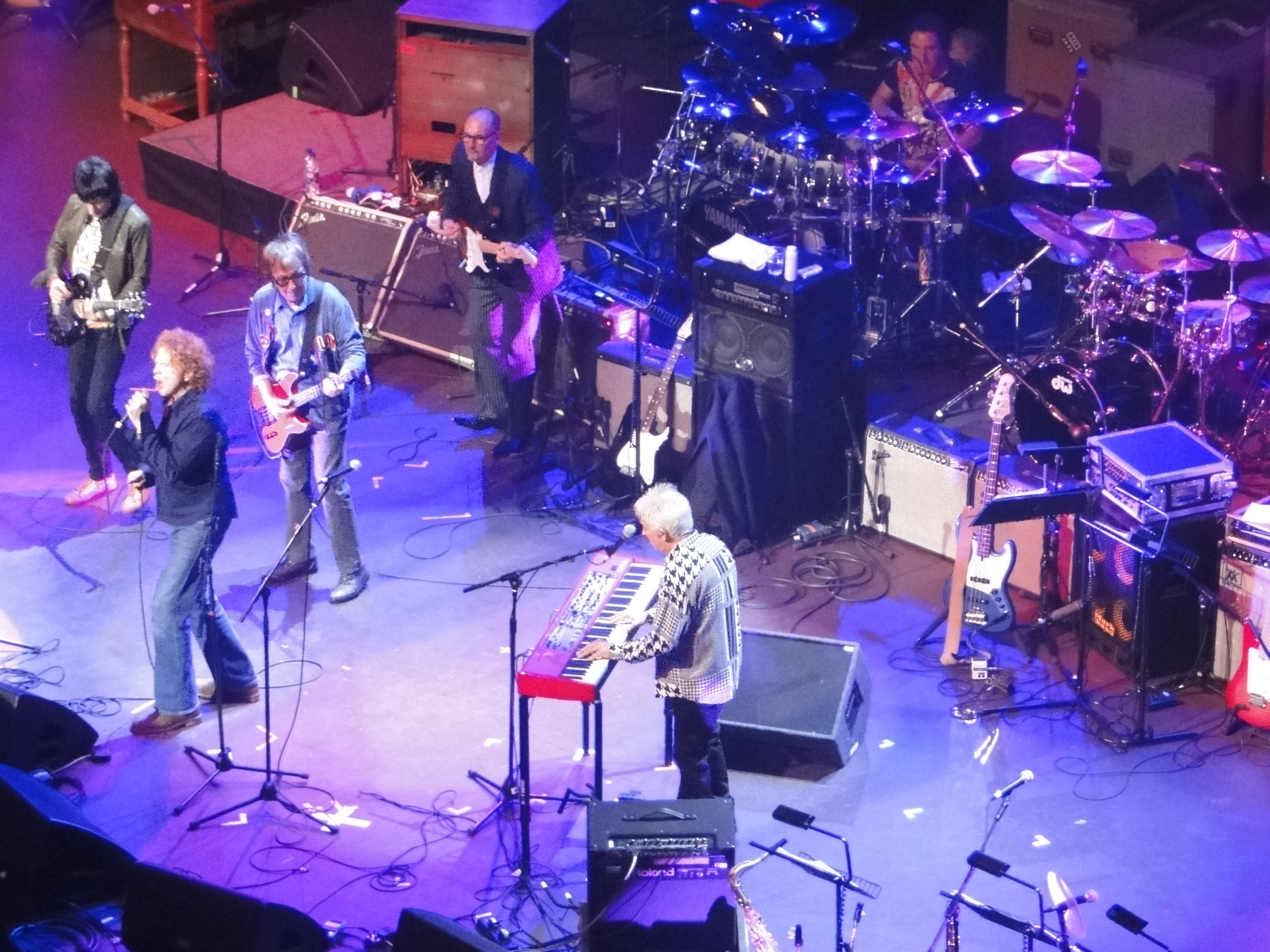
The band reunited at the Royal Albert Hall, October 2009

On 11 June 2008, Rod Stewart announced that the surviving Faces were discussing a possible reunion, envisioning making a recording and/or performing at least one or two concerts. On 18 November Rod Stewart, Ron Wood, Ian McLagan and Kenney Jones reunited along with Rod Stewart's touring bassist Conrad Korsch for a rehearsal "just to check if they can remember the songs"; the band's official reunion website was launched earlier the same month. However, on 23 January 2009, a spokesman for Rod Stewart denied there were any plans for a 2009 Faces reunion tour.

On 24 September 2009, it was announced that the Faces, minus Rod Stewart, would reunite for a one-off charity show for the Performing Rights Society's Music Members' Benevolent Fund, at the Royal Albert Hall in London. "This will be so special for us, staging a reunion for such a wonderful and prestigious event," said Ronnie Wood when the announcement of the concert was made. "Sadly Ronnie Lane can't be with us, but I'm sure he will be there in spirit, God bless him." Lane's ex-wife, Katy, is one of many to receive assistance from the charity. The event was held on 25 October. Ronnie Wood, Kenney Jones and Ian McLagan all took part, with various vocalists, including Mick Hucknall, replacing Stewart, and Bill Wyman filling in for the late Ronnie Lane on bass guitar.

On 25 May 2010, it was announced that the Faces had officially reformed with Hucknall taking on vocal duties, and Glen Matlock of the Sex Pistols on bass. The band played festival dates in both 2010 and 2011, with dates in the UK, Belgium, the Netherlands and Japan.

The Small Faces/Faces were inducted into the Rock and Roll Hall of Fame in 2012. On 23 March, the Faces announced that they would reunite with Rod Stewart to play at the induction ceremony for the first time in 19 years. However, on the eve of the ceremony, Stewart bowed out owing to a bout of influenza and Hucknall was asked to sing in his place. In June 2013, speaking in an interview on YouTube, Kenney Jones confirmed the band's intention to reunite with Stewart for a tour in 2014. However, Ian McLagan died on 3 December 2014, putting this reunion in doubt.

Rod Stewart, Ronnie Wood and Kenney Jones performed a short set at Hurtwood Polo Club on 5 September 2015 for charity, following their brief reunion at Rod Stewart's private party for his 70th birthday in January of that year. The reunion show was critically acclaimed, with The Telegraph newspaper reviewing the performance as "5 star," under the headline of "worth the 40-year wait."

A further reunion occurred in 2019 at a private event. In 2020, Rod Stewart reunited with Ronnie Wood and Kenney Jones to perform "Stay with Me" as the finale of that years Brit Awards Ceremony.

On 19 July 2021, it was reported that Jones, Stewart and Wood had reunited in the studio to record new music. Since then they have continued to work together on tracks for an album planned for release in 2026.

=== Influence on music ===
Although they enjoyed only modest success compared to contemporaries such as the Who and the Rolling Stones, the Faces have had considerable influence on latter-day rock revivalists. Their back-to-basics rock and roll sound was cited as influential by punk rock bands, such as the Damned and the Sex Pistols.

They were inducted into the Rock and Roll Hall of Fame in 2012.

== Personnel ==
=== Current and former members ===
- Kenney Jones – drums, percussion (1969–1975, 1986, 1993, 2009–2012, 2015, 2019, 2020, 2021–present)
- Ronnie Wood – guitar, vocals, bass (1969–1975, 1986, 1993, 2009–2012, 2015, 2019, 2020, 2021–present)
- Rod Stewart – lead vocals, harmonica, occasional banjo and guitar (1969–1975, 1986, 1993, 2015, 2019, 2020, 2021–present)
- Ian McLagan – keyboards, backing vocals (1969–1975, 1986, 1993, 2009–2012; died 2014)
- Ronnie Lane – bass, vocals, guitar (1969–1973; died 1997)
- Tetsu Yamauchi – bass (1973–1975; died 2025)

=== Additional personnel ===
- Jesse Ed Davis – rhythm guitar (1975; died 1988)
- Bill Wyman – bass (1986, 1993, 2009)
- Andy Fairweather Low – rhythm guitar (2009)
- Mick Hucknall – lead vocals (2009–2012)
- Glen Matlock – bass (2010–2012)
- Robin Le Mesurier – guitar (2015; died 2021)

== Discography ==
=== Studio albums ===
- First Step (1970)
- Long Player (1971)
- A Nod Is As Good As a Wink... to a Blind Horse (1971)
- Ooh La La (1973)
