= Small Faces discography =

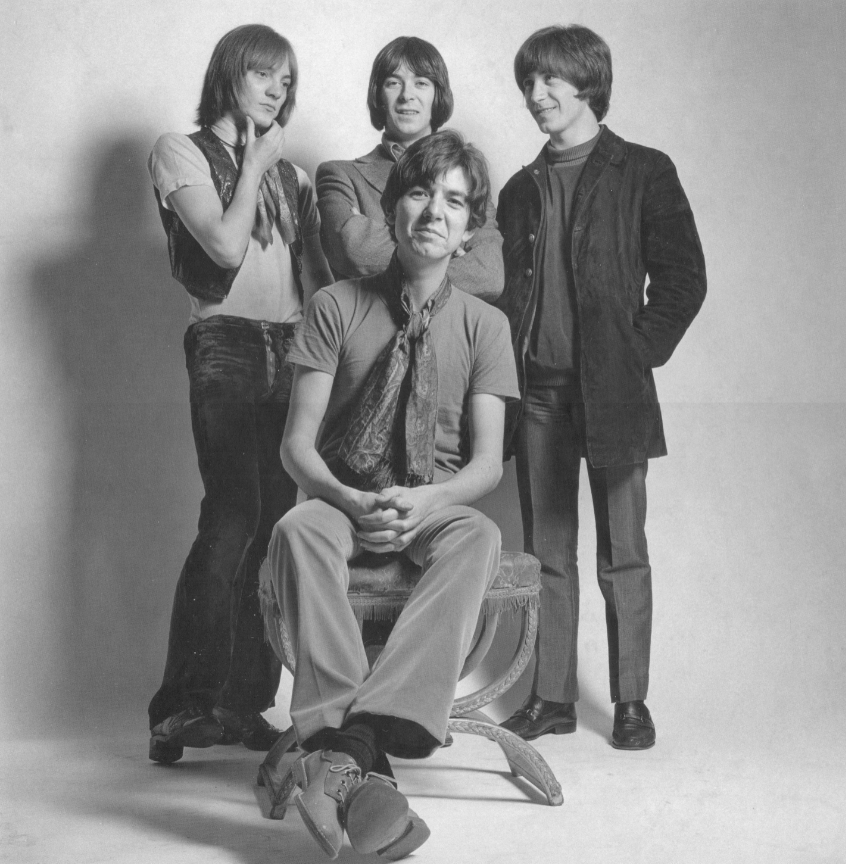
- The Small Faces in 1968
- Studio albums: 5
- Live albums: 2
- Compilation albums: 14
- Singles: 21
- B-sides: 21

The Small Faces were an English rock band who were initially active between 1965 and 1969. During their original tenure, they released three studio albums, (Note: Immediate Records released There Are But Four Small Faces in place of the band's two first self-titled studio albums Small Faces (Decca) and Small Faces (Immediate) in the US on 17 March 1968. Authors John Hellier and Paolo Hewitt list the release as a compilation album.) four compilation albums and fourteen singles in the United Kingdom. With the exception of the band's two first singles "Whatcha Gonna Do About It" and "I've Got Mine" (both 1965) that featured Jimmy Winston on guitar and keyboards, Small Faces had a consistent lineup of guitarist Steve Marriott, bassist Ronnie Lane, keyboardist Ian McLagan and drummer Kenney Jones. (Note: In addition to the group's two first singles, Winston also played on roughly half of the debut album Small Faces before being replaced by McLagan.) Between August 1965 and June 1968, the Small Faces scored ten top-20 singles on the UK singles chart, including seven top-10 releases, of which "All or Nothing" reached number one. Several of their singles were featured on the UK's year-end ranking, and they became the eleventh best-selling recording artist in Britain during 1966. Despite their success in Britain, the Small Faces only scored one top-20 hit on the US Billboard Hot 100 with "Itchycoo Park" (1967), and have thus been referred to as "the best English band never to hit it big in America" by AllMusic critic Bruce Eder. The Small Faces achieved success during the transition to the album era, with their third and final studio album Ogdens' Nut Gone Flake reaching number one for six weeks during the summer of 1968. The band initially broke up in 1969 after Marriott formed Humble Pie with Peter Frampton.

The Small Faces' debut album and eight first singles were released by Decca Records in the UK under the management of Don Arden. The band were not directly signed to Decca, but rather to Arden's production company Contemporary Music. The Small Faces signed a three-year recording contract on 10 June 1965 together with their parents, as they were underage. Throughout 1966, the Small Faces' relationship with Arden soured, particularly after the single "My Mind's Eye" was released in November without the band's consent. After an incident in which Arden told the band members' parents about supposed drug use, the band turned to Andrew Loog Oldham's independent record label Immediate Records, who bought the contract from Arden for £25,000 and signed the band in February 1967. As a direct retaliation, Arden released the compilation album From the Beginning and the single "Patterns" in an attempt to hamper the success of the band's Immediate debut single "Here Come the Nice" (all 1967). With Immediate, the band released a further two studio albums and seven singles during their original tenure. The Small Faces reunited in the mid-1970s after a re-issue of "Itchycoo Park" had become a hit, and the band released the albums Playmates and 78 in the Shade to limited commercial and critical success while signed to Atlantic Records.

The Small Faces' music has been compiled on hundreds of compilation albums following their breakup, starting with The Autumn Stone in November 1969, which contained material the band had released on both Decca and Immediate. Most subsequent compilation albums are solely bound to the material Decca or Immediate had the rights to; a notable exception to this rule is the 2003 compilation album Ultimate Collection, released on Sanctuary Records, which features tracks from both of the band's labels. Sanctuary owns the rights to the Immediate Recordings in the UK, whilst Charly Records owns the rights in the US. The multitrack tapes for the group's Immediate recordings were presumed lost after Virgin Records took over ownership of Olympic Studios in the 1970s. A few of them were salvaged, and released on the Here Come the Nice: The Immediate Years 1967–1969 box set in January 2014. The Decca Recordings are currently owned by Decca under Universal Music Group, who released The Decca Years 1965–1967 box set in 2015 from recently discovered first generation master tapes.

== Albums ==
=== Studio albums ===
List of studio albums with selected chart positions and certifications
Year	Title	Album details	Peak chart positions					Certifications (sales thresholds)
Year	Title	Album details	UK	US	FIN	NOR (Note: VG-lista published its first album chart on 1 January 1967.)	GER	Certifications (sales thresholds)
1966	Small Faces	Released 6 May 1966; Label: Decca Records (LK 4790)	3	—	8	×	—	
1967	Small Faces	Released: 23 June 1967; Label: Immediate Records (IMLP 008) (Note: Stereo LP catalogue number was IMSP 008)	12	—	—	—	—	
1968	Ogdens' Nut Gone Flake	Released: 24 May 1968; Label: Immediate Records (IMLP 012) (Note: Stereo LP catalogue number was IMSP 012)	1	159	5	13	6	BPI: Gold
1977	Playmates	Released: 12 August 1977; Label: Atlantic Records (SD 19113)	—	—	—	—	—	
1978	78 in the Shade	Released: 9 September 1978; Label: Atlantic Records (K 50468)	—	—	—	—	—	
"—" denotes releases that did not chart or were not released in that territory. "×" denotes the chart did not exist yet.

=== Live albums ===
List of live albums
Year	Title	Album details
2000	The BBC Sessions	Released: 29 February 2000; Label: Strange Fruit (SFRSCD087)
2021	Live 1966 (Note: Archival release, recorded live in Mouscron, Belgium on 9 January 1966)	Released: 3 September 2021; Label: Nice Records (NRCD001)

=== Compilation albums ===
List of compilation albums with selected chart positions and certifications
Year	Title	Album details	Peak chart positions		Certifications (sales thresholds)
Year	Title	Album details	UK	US	Certifications (sales thresholds)
1967	From the Beginning (Note: Issued by Decca after the Small Faces had signed with Immediate Records)	Released 2 June 1967; Label: Decca Records (LK 4879)	17	—	
1968	There Are But Four Small Faces	Released: February 1968 (Note: US-only release); Label: Immediate Records (Z12 52 002)	—	178	
1969	In Memoriam	Released 1 May 1969 (Note: West Germany, France and Australian-only release); Label: Immediate Records (1 C 048-90 201)	—	—	
1969	The Autumn Stone	Released 14 November 1969; Label: Immediate Records (IMAL 01 IMAL 02)	—	—	
1972	Early Faces	Released: 1972; Label: Pride (PRD 0001)	—	176	
1976	Rock Roots	Released: 1976; Label: Decca Records (ROOTS 5)	—	—	
1990	The Singles As and Bs	Released: 1990; Label: See For Miles Records (SEE CD 293)	—	—	
1992	All Or Nothing	Released: 30 June 1992; Label: Sony Special Products (AK 52427)	—	—	
1995	The Best of Small Faces	Released: 26 July 1995; Label: Summit Records (SUMCD 4001)	—	—	BPI: Silver
1995	The Immediate Years	Released: 7 August 1995; Label: Charly Records (CD IMM BOX 1)	—	—	
1996	The Decca Anthology	Released: 1996; Label: Deram Records (844 583-2)	66	—	
2000	The Darlings of Wapping Wharf Launderette	Released: 16 May 2000; Label: Immediate Records (NEECD 311)	—	—	
2002	Odds And Mods	Released: 20 August 2002; Label: Immediate Records (302 061 227 2)	—	—	
2003	Ultimate Collection	Released: 26 May 2003; Label: Sanctuary Records (TDSAN 004)	24	—	BPI: Silver
2014	Here Come the Nice: The Immediate Years 1967–1969	Released: 27 January 2014; Label: Charly Records (CHARLY 170 BX)	—	—	
2014	Greatest Hits: The Immediate Years 1967–1969	Released: 27 January 2014; Label: Charly Records (CHARLY 654 X)	—	—	
2015	The Decca Years 1965–1967	Released: 9 October 2015; Label: Universal Music Group (473 429-6)	—	—	
2021	The Complete Atlantic Years	Released: 18 June 2021; Label: Wounded Bird Records (WOU 6038)	—	—	
"—" denotes releases that did not chart or were not released in that territory.

== Singles ==
List of singles, with selected chart positions and certifications
Year	Single details	Peak chart positions							Certifications (sales thresholds)	Album
Year	Single details	UK	AUS (Note: Go-Set published the first Australian national chart on 7 October 1966. Charts prior to the publishing of Go-Set are taken from David Kent's Kent Music Report.)	CAN	SWE	NL	NOR	US	Certifications (sales thresholds)	Album
1965	"Whatcha Gonna Do About It" b/w "What's a Matter Baby": Released: 6 August 1965 (UK); Label: Decca Records (F.12208)	14	—	28	—	—	—	—		non-album single (Note: The song was later included on the album Small Faces.)
1965	"I've Got Mine" b/w "It's Too Late" (from Small Faces): Released: 5 November 1965 (UK); Label: Decca Records (F.12276)	—	x	x	—	x	x	x		non-album single
1966	"Sha-La-La-La-Lee" b/w "Grow Your Own": Released: 28 January 1966 (UK); Label: Decca Records (F.12317)	3	51	—	—	— (Note: "Sha-La-La-La-Lee" did not chart on the Dutch Single Top 100, but reached number 31 on the Dutch Top 40.)	—	—		Small Faces
1966	"Hey Girl" b/w "Almost Grown": Released: 6 May 1966 (UK); Label: Decca Records (F.12393)	10	60	—	—	—	—	—		non-album single (Note: The song was later included on the album From the Beginning)
1966	"All or Nothing" b/w "Understanding": Released: 5 August 1966 (UK); Label: Decca Records (F.12470)	1	15	—	15	2	10	—		non-album single
1966	"My Mind's Eye" b/w "I Can't Dance With You": Released: 11 November 1966 (UK); Label: Decca Records (F.12500)	4	—	—	17	13	—	—		non-album single
1967	"I Can't Make It" b/w "Just Passing": Released: 3 March 1967 (UK); Label: Decca Records (F.12565)	26	—	—	—	—	—	—		non-album single (Note: The song was later included on the album The Autumn Stone)
1967	"Patterns" (Note: Issued by Decca after the Small Faces had signed with Immediate Recordsbreak) b/w "E Too D" (from Small Faces): Released: 26 May 1967 (UK); Label: Decca Records (F.12619)	51 (Note: Chart position is from the official UK "Breakers List".)	—	—	—	—	—	—		non-album single
1967	"Here Come the Nice" b/w "Talk to You" (from Small Faces): Released: 2 June 1967 (UK); Label: Immediate Records (IM 050)	12	—	—	—	— (Note: "Here Come the Nice" did not chart on the Dutch Single Top 100, but reached number 28 on the Dutch Top 40.)	—	—		non-album single
1967	"Itchycoo Park" b/w "I'm Only Dreaming": Released: 4 August 1967 (UK); Label: Immediate Records (IM 057)	3	2	1	—	3	4	16	BPI: Silver	non-album single
1967	"Tin Soldier" b/w "I Feel Much Better": Released: 2 December 1967 (UK); Label: Immediate Records (IM 062)	9	3	38	16	4	—	73		non-album single
1968	"Lazy Sunday" b/w "Rollin' Over (Part II of Happiness Stan)" (from Ogdens' Nut Gone Flake): Released: 5 April 1968 (UK); Label: Immediate Records (IM 064)	2	5	42	—	1	7	114		Ogdens' Nut Gone Flake
1968	"The Universal" (Note: Marriott originally titled the song "Hello The Universal", something that "escaped before we [Small Faces and Immediate Records] could put that right".) b/w "Donkey Rides, A Penny, A Glass": Released: 28 June 1968 (UK); Label: Immediate Records (IM 069)	16	37	—	—	12	—	—		non-album single
1969	"Mad John" (Note: North America and Australian-only release) b/w "The Journey" (from Ogdens' Nut Gone Flake): Released: 1969 (US, AUS); Label: Immediate Records (IM-8561, ZS7 5012)	x	—	—	x	x	x	—		Ogdens' Nut Gone Flake
1969	"Afterglow of Your Love" b/w "Wham Bam Thank You Mam": Released: 7 March 1969 (UK); Label: Immediate Records (IM 077)	36	95	—	—	19	—	—		Ogdens' Nut Gone Flake
1975	"Itchycoo Park" (Note: Re-issue sanctioned by Immediate employee Tony Calder) b/w "My Way of Giving" (from Small Faces): Released: 22 November 1975 (UK); Label: Immediate Records (IMS 102)	9	—	x	x	x	x	x		non-album single
1976	"Lazy Sunday" b/w "(Tell Me) Have You Ever Seen Me?" (from Small Faces): Released: 19 March 1976 (UK); Label: Immediate Records (IMS 106)	39	x	x	x	x	x	x		Ogdens' Nut Gone Flake
1977	"Lookin' for a Love" b/w "Kayoed (By Luv)" (from Playmates): Released: 29 July 1977 (UK); Label: Atlantic Records (K 10983)	—	—	x	x	—	x	x		Playmates
1977	"Stand By Me, Stand By You" b/w "Hungry And Looking": Released: 12 November 1977 (UK); Label: Atlantic Records (K 11043)	—	x	x	x	x	x	x		78 in the Shade
1978	"Filthy Rich" b/w "Over Too Soon" (from 78 in the Shade): Released: 15 July 1978 (UK); Label: Atlantic Records (K 11173)	—	x	x	x	x	x	x		78 in the Shade
2013	"Green Circles (stereo)" (Note: Record Store Day release by Charly Records. "Here Comes the Nice" was also re-issued on the same day.) b/w "Green Circles (mono)" (from Small Faces): Released: 20 April 2013 (UK); Label: Charly Records (CHARLY 108 S)	—	x	x	x	x	x	x		Small Faces
"—" denotes releases that did not chart. "x" denotes single not released in that territory.

=== Year-end rankings ===
List of singles with selected year-end chart rankings
Year	Single	Year-end rankings
Year	Single	UK
1966	"Sha-La-La-La-Lee"	41
1966	"All or Nothing"	19
1966	"My Mind's Eye"	73
1967	"Itchycoo Park"	33
1968	"Lazy Sunday"	38
