= Small Faces (1967 album) =

Studio album by Small Faces
- Released: 23 June 1967
- Recorded: October 1966 – April 1967
- Studios: IBC and Olympic, London
- Genres: R&B; psychedelic rock; psychedelic pop
- Length: 30:24
- Label: Immediate
- Producers: Ronnie Lane; Steve Marriott

Small Faces chronology
From the Beginning (1967)	Small Faces (1967)	Ogdens' Nut Gone Flake (1968)

Small Faces is the second studio album by Small Faces, released through Immediate Records on 23 June 1967. Although this was their first album for new manager Andrew Loog Oldham's Immediate label, recording actually commenced during their tenure with Decca Records, whom they left in January 1967 after severing professional ties with original manager Don Arden. As a result of the switch of label and management, Decca and Arden released an outtakes compilation album, From the Beginning in early June 1967 in order to sabotage the chart success of the Immediate Small Faces release - something that it managed to do to some extent when From the Beginning reached number 17 in the UK charts. The Immediate album shares its name with their 1966 Decca debut album, which has led to some confusion regarding the titles. As a result of this, it has been unofficially dubbed The First Immediate Album by several fans.

The album is considered to be the artistic breakthrough for the group in terms of songwriting and composition, and marks their transition from a mod-influenced blue-eyed soul/R&B band to a psychedelic studio group, which they were then seen as from this point until their breakup in early 1969. 'Small Faces' was recorded over a lengthy (by the standard of the time) period of nine months, during the band's tenure on both Decca and Immediate Records, at two separate studios. It is their first LP to contain solely original compositions. Thirteen of the album's fourteen tracks were either written or co-written by Steve Marriott and Ronnie Lane, in contrast to the group's 1966 debut, in which only seven of the twelve tracks are credited to the band, with the remaining tracks being written by artists such as Kenny Lynch and Ian Samwell, or being R&B covers that were parts of the group's early repertoire.

The album incorporates a blend of several different moods and genres of music, ranging from the relatively straight-up R&B of "Talk To You", the blue-eyed soul balladry of "My Way of Giving" and the brass-driven, bouncy soul-pop of "All Our Yesterdays", to the more complex baroque pop of "Show Me the Way" and "Feeling Lonely", and the power pop and psychedelia of tracks such as "(Tell Me) Have You Ever Seen Me" and "Green Circles". The album also marks the debut of Ian McLagan as a solo composer, contributing his song "Up the Wooden Hills to Bedfordshire" which is the first of two compositions for the group credited to him alone (the second being "Long Agos and Worlds Apart" from Ogdens' Nut Gone Flake). It is also the first studio album by the group where McLagan plays on all tracks, whereas on their debut album both he and Jimmy Winston are jointly credited as keyboardist (about half of the debut album was recorded with Winston in June–September 1965, with the remaining tracks being recorded after McLagan joined the band in November 1965).

The album reached number 12 on the UK charts, becoming their only original studio album to chart outside the top-10 (both their debut album and Ogdens' Nut Gone Flake reached the top-5). Despite not containing a hit single, it was released in between their smash hits "Here Come the Nice" and "Itchycoo Park" and was highly regarded by other musicians, exerting a strong influence on a number of bands both at home and abroad. The album received mostly positive reviews from critics and fans alike, and has been featured on several best of lists, including Ultimate Classic Rock's list of Top 100 '60s Rock Albums, along with several lists by Mojo magazine. Many fans consider Small Faces to be the group's best album.

== Background ==
=== Boundary Park incident (1966) ===
In 1966, the Small Faces managed to chart a top-5 album and four consecutive top-10 singles on the UK Singles Chart, including their number one hit "All or Nothing" which peaked in September 1966. The band had now developed a notable fanbase in the United Kingdom and mainland Europe. In a notable incident, fans of the band had, after a performance at the Boundary Park stadium, attempted breaking into the band's vehicle, even climbing on top of it. Of the occurrence, Ian McLagan stated the following:

"The pitch was already soggy and fans started to surround the car in their hundreds. Kids were climbing on the roof. "The ground was pretty soft and the car just wouldn't move. It was right in the middle of the pitch and it just started to go down and down and down. The four of us and the driver were getting the real horrors. The kids' faces were getting mashed up against the windows and I remember seeing one little kid being pushed down and her head disappearing out of sight. We were shouting "Look out for that kid" and then the roof of the car started to bow inward under the sheer weight of the kids on top. We were holding the roof up which was really starting to cave in and there wasn't much air in the car 'cos we couldn't open the windows which really set a panic in."

— Ian McLagan

=== Leaving Decca and signing to Immediate (1966–1967) ===
Demand for a new album had increased towards the end of the year, and by late 1966, Small Faces had slowly started to abandon their rhythm and blues roots, in favour of more psychedelic direction. The Beatles' manager Brian Epstein held a party at their residence on 22 Westmoreland Terrace in Pimlico, London, and introduced them to LSD for the first time after serving them spiked orange pieces served on the plate. Most tracks on the album were conceived and written by December 1966 and the earlier parts of 1967 by Steve Marriott and Ronnie Lane. Ian McLagan wrote his first solo-song for the band, titled "Up the Wooden Hills to Bedfordshire"; This is the sole composition on the album that was not written or co-written by the Marriott/Lane partnership.

During the later parts of 1966, their affiliation with Don Arden and Decca Records had strained, due to several aspects, including the fact that the band received barely any royalties from their records, and that "My Mind's Eye" had been released without consent by the band. After a messy confrontation with Arden who tried to face down the boys' parents by claiming that the whole band were using drugs, they cut their ties with Arden and Decca. They were almost straight away offered a deal with the newly-established Immediate label, formed by ex-Rolling Stones manager Andrew Loog Oldham, which they stayed on until their break-up in 1969.

== Recording ==
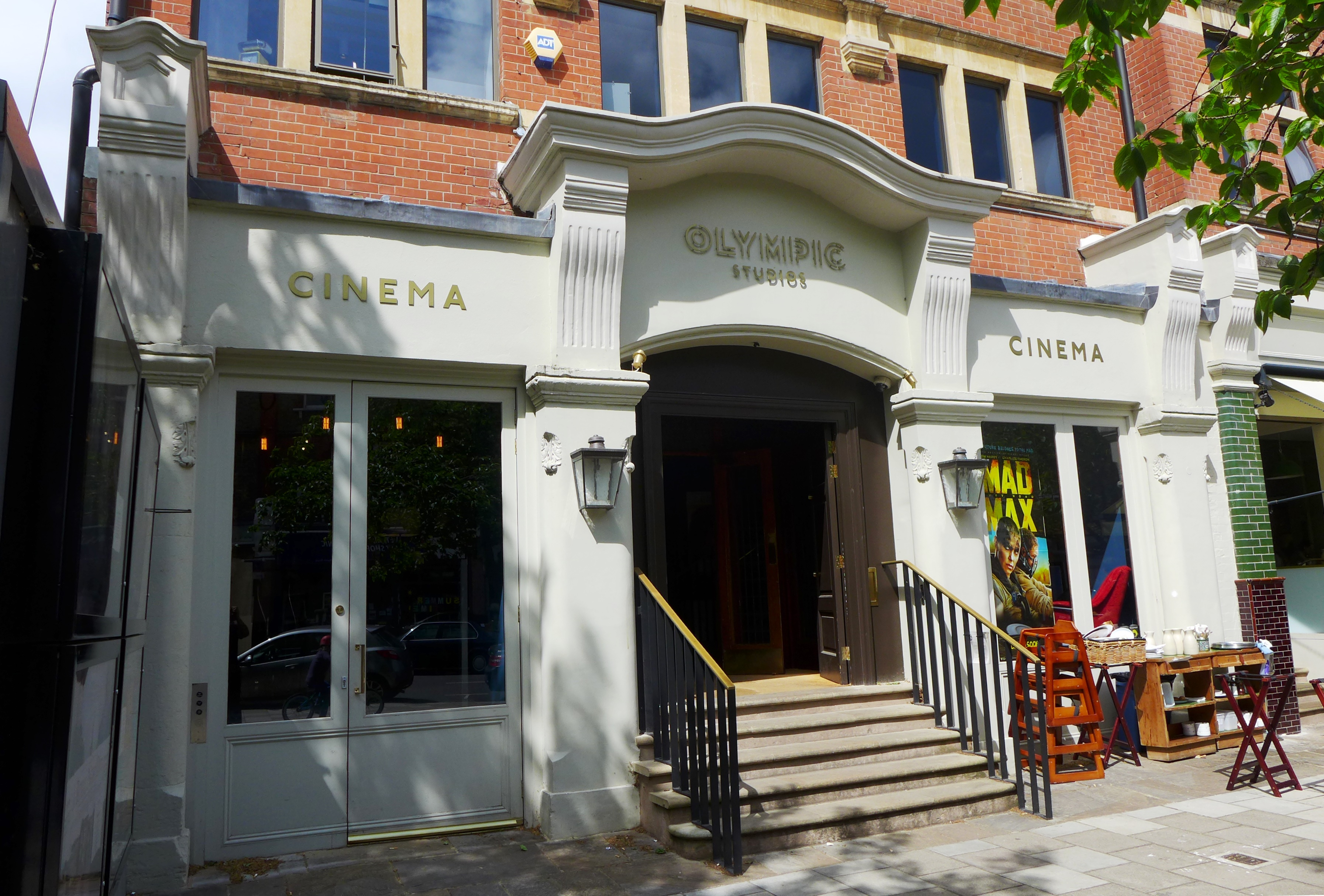
The majority of Small Faces was recorded at Olympic Studios, Barnes in London with engineer Glyn Johns.

Tracks recorded specifically for a follow-up album to their debut commenced by August 1966 when tracks such as "My Mind's Eye", "Yesterday, Today and Tomorrow, "My Way of Giving", "(Tell Me) Have You Ever Seen Me?" and "That Man" were taped at IBC Studios, while the band were still signed to Decca Records. Between 5–7 December of that year, the group cut a song entitled "Picaninny", a three-minute instrumental piece featuring Steve Marriott on harmonica. This track is thought to be a backing track, even though it had received mixes in both mono and stereo. Ultimately it was not included on the album, and got its official release on the compilation cassette Small Faces – Big Music: A Compleat Collection in 1984.

In early December, work on "Get Yourself Together" had started. By 13 December 1966 the group cut the backing track of the song "Green Circles" at IBC, further takes of the songs were recorded at Olympic Studios on 10 January 1967, with vocal takes attempted by both Steve Marriott and Ronnie Lane during that session. The following day, the group recorded "All Our Yesterdays", "Just Passing" and 11 takes of a track dubbed "Doolally", which was eventually renamed to "Things Are Going to Get Better" after recording take 14, which became the master track. At this point, the master take of "Get Yourself Together" had been completed. By 16 January, "Talk to You" had been recorded.

By February, the group recorded "Become Like You", "Something I Want to Tell You" and "Feeling Lonely". On 28 February, "Eddie's Dreaming" had been recorded. The same day, "Get Yourself Together" and "Green Circles" had been mixed both in stereo and mono, with the definitive version featuring Ronnie Lane on lead vocals. In March, "My Way of Giving" had been rehauled, and "Up The Wooden Hills To Bedfordshire" had been recorded. The remaining tracks were recorded in April, and mixing had been finalized by May.

== Musical content ==
The album is a huge departure from the sound that made up their previous two albums, their eponymous debut and the compilation From the Beginning. Both albums featured many rhythm and blues covers, alongside originals in order to appeal to the mod audience the group amassed. (Note: The mod scene was largely attracted to rhythm and blues and soul, with the Who and Small Faces being the largest bands directed towards the subculture in 1965 and 1966.) For Small Faces, they wrote more material that could be classified as pop or psychedelia, which by 1967–1969 had reached its peak popularity. Both "All Our Yesterdays" and "Eddie's Dreaming" incorporate brass instruments as focal points, while many other tracks feature the harpsichord played by Ian McLagan. The instrument is most prevalent on "Feeling Lonely" and "Show Me the Way". The album also features influences from folk rock on "Become Like You" and "Get Yourself Together", the latter of which features Marriott on twelve-string acoustic guitar.

It was by achieving this synthesis that Marriott and the band believed they had now met the criteria expected of them. Ronnie Lane's predilection for a softer, pastoral and more psychedelic sound was heavily evident on songs such as "Show Me The Way" and "All Our Yesterdays". It was the first release to feature Lane as a prevalent songwriter.

During the Decca period most of the self-penned stuff was 99% Steve. It wasn’t until Immediate that Ronnie became more involved. The first Immediate album is made up of 50% Steve’s songs and 50% of Ronnie’s. They didn’t collaborate as much as people thought. In fact, when they did, they often ended up arguing and fighting.'

— Kenney Jones, Steve Marriott: All Too Beautiful... pg 151

The vocal duty on the album is more varied than on their debut album, where Marriott sang ten of the twelve tracks. (Note: With the exception of "Shake" which is sung by Lane, and "Own Up Time" which is an instrumental.) On the record, Lane assumes lead vocals on four songs, with Marriott singing lead on six. McLagan sings his sole composition "Up the Wooden Hills to Bedfordshire". Marriott and Lane share lead vocals on "Green Circles" and "Become Like You" while the remaining track "Happy Boys Happy" is an instrumental.

== Release and reception ==
=== Release ===
The album was released in both monaural and stereophonic versions on 23 June 1967 (IMLP 008 and IMSP 008, mono and stereo versions respectively) in the United Kingdom, and later, it was released in mainland Europe and Oceania. Even though it was a success, it failed to breach the top 10, peaking at number 12 on the UK Album Chart. This is most likely due to the lack of a hit single accompanying the album. (Note: In the 1960s it was common procedure to include a recent hit single on studio albums, like Small Faces did with "Sha-La-La-La-Lee" on their debut album, and "Lazy Sunday" on Ogdens' Nut Gone Flake; both albums managed to chart within the top 5 on the UK Albums chart.) Ultimately, it became the original lineup's only studio effort to fail charting within the top 5 on the UK albums chart, as both their debut and Ogdens' Nut Gone Flake peaked at number 3 and 1 respectively.

The tracks recorded in the sessions from August 1966 ended up in assorted ways; "My Mind's Eye" was issued as a single in November 1966, peaking at number 4. The remainder of the tracks ended up on From the Beginning, an album compiled of singles and unreleased material released by Decca on 2 June 1967. Of these tracks, only "(Tell Me) Have You Ever Seen Me?" and "My Way of Giving" were issued (in their re-recorded versions) on Small Faces. "Talk to You" was released as the B-Side of "Here Come the Nice" on 2 June, it managed to reach number 12 on UK Singles chart.

=== Reception ===
Professional ratings
Review scores
Source	Rating
AllMusic	5/5 stars
Classic Rock	8/10
Mojo	4/5 stars
MusicHound	3/5 stars
Rolling Stone Album Guide (1992)	3.5/5 stars
Martin C. Strong	7/10
Uncut	3/5 stars
Virgin Encyclopedia of Popular Music	3/5 stars

The album was well received and reviewed upon its release. In a retrospective review, AllMusic critic Stephen Thomas Erlewine gave it 5 out 5 stars, praising the album for its sophisticated songs, and its pop melodies, stating: "there may be some harpsichords but no outright psychedelia -- but it is bright, colorful, and concentrated, its very brevity playing like snappy pop art. No song runs over three minutes and many clock in under two, a direct contrast to the somewhat extended grooves of their 1966 LP, and an aesthetic that lends this an exceptionally modern feel: all the tunes are sharply cut and precisely tailored, with no wasted moments."

The Classic Rock magazine gave it 8/10 stars, while Mojo granted it 4 stars.

=== Reissues ===
LP reissues became the standard format for many years, until it finally became available on compact disc in Japan in 1989. Further CD remasters would reach mainland Europe, UK and the United States, where the album had been unavailable since 1967. Tracks from the album have since been included within compilations, most notably in The Darlings of Wapping Wharf Launderette, a 2-CD compilation of their work on Immediate Records, in which all tracks from it were included. Remasters of the album with a blue tint were sold exclusively at various Sainsbury's locations during 2018.

However, the most prevalent and well-known of these reissues is the 2012 Deluxe Edition, which features several previously unreleased tracks, along with various A-sides and B-sides of the group's 1967 singles. On this remaster is the track "Don't Burst My Bubble", recorded in February 1968. Paul Weller cited it as an inspiration for the title track of the Jam's 1982 studio album The Gift.

== In popular culture ==
The album is a favourite of Paul Weller, who named the album in his 'Top Ten of All-Time' in 1992. The Jam had covered "Get Yourself Together" between 1981–1982.

Donovan (a friend of the Small Faces) recorded "Hurdy Gurdy Man" in 1968, a song that both musically and thematically references "Green Circles."

British singer Chris Farlowe released a cover of "My Way of Giving" as a single in early 1967. His version stayed on the UK Singles Chart for a single week, peaking at number 48.

"My Way of Giving" was also covered by Rod Stewart for his 1970 album Gasoline Alley backed by, as the personnel credits on the LP reveal, The Faces. The Faces featured former Small Faces Lane, Jones and McLagan, alongside Stewart and Ronnie Wood. Lane, Jones and McLagan are therefore effectively covering their own song, albeit it in a quite different, more uptempo 'Motown' style arrangement.

== Track listing ==
All tracks written by Steve Marriott and Ronnie Lane unless noted.

Side One
No.	Title	Writer(s)	Lead vocals	Length
1.	"(Tell Me) Have You Ever Seen Me?"		Steve Marriott	2:16
2.	"Something I Want to Tell You"		Ronnie Lane	2:10
3.	"Feeling Lonely"		Marriott	1:35
4.	"Happy Boys Happy"		Instrumental	1:36
5.	"Things Are Going to Get Better"		Marriott	2:39
6.	"My Way of Giving"		Marriott	1:59
7.	"Green Circles"	Marriott; Lane; Michael O'Sullivan	Lane with Marriott	2:46
Total length:				15:01

Side Two
No.	Title	Writer(s)	Lead vocals	Length
1.	"Become Like You"		Marriott with Lane	1:58
2.	"Get Yourself Together"		Marriott	2:16
3.	"All Our Yesterdays"		Lane	1:53
4.	"Talk to You"		Marriott	2:09
5.	"Show Me the Way"		Lane	2:08
6.	"Up the Wooden Hills to Bedfordshire"	Ian McLagan	McLagan	2:05
7.	"Eddie's Dreaming"	Marriott; Lane; McLagan	Lane	2:54
Total length:				15:23

=== 2012 Deluxe edition ===
The album was completely remastered in 2012 and reissued as compact discs with previously unreleased material, along with various A-sides and B-sides from 1967.

2012 Deluxe Edition CD disc 1 (mono)
No.	Title	Writer(s)	Original release	Length
1.	"(Tell Me) Have You Ever Seen Me?"		original album	2:16
2.	"Something I Want to Tell You"		original album	2:10
3.	"Feeling Lonely"		original album	1:35
4.	"Happy Boys Happy"		original album	1:36
5.	"Things Are Going to Get Better"		original album	2:39
6.	"My Way of Giving"		original album	1:59
7.	"Green Circles"	Marriott; Lane; O'Sullivan	original album	2:46
8.	"Become Like You"		original album	1:58
9.	"Get Yourself Together"		original album	2:16
10.	"All Our Yesterdays"		original album	1:53
11.	"Talk to You"		original album	2:09
12.	"Show Me the Way"		original album	2:08
13.	"Up the Wooden Hills to Bedfordshire"	McLagan	original album	2:05
14.	"Eddie's Dreaming"	Marriott; Lane; McLagan	original album	2:54
15.	"Here Come the Nice"		Single A-side, 1967	3:06
16.	"Itchycoo Park"		Single A-side, 1967	2:45
17.	"I'm Only Dreaming"	Marriott; Lane; McLagan	B-side of 'Itchycoo Park', 1967	2:21
18.	"Tin Soldier"		Single A-side, 1967	3:16
19.	"I Feel Much Better"	Marriott; Lane; McLagan	B-side of 'Tin Soldier', 1967	3:55
20.	"(Tell Me) Have You Ever Seen Me?" (Alternate mix)		previously unreleased	2:03
21.	"Eddie's Dreaming" (Alternate mix)	Marriott; Lane; McLagan	previously unreleased	2:41
22.	"Green Circles" (Take 1: Alternate mix 3)	Marriott; Lane; O'Sullivan	previously unreleased	2:35
Total length:				53:06

2012 Deluxe Edition CD disc 2 (stereo)
No.	Title	Writer(s)	Original release	Length
1.	"(Tell Me) Have You Ever Seen Me?"		original album	2:16
2.	"Something I Want to Tell You"		original album	2:10
3.	"Feeling Lonely"		original album	1:35
4.	"Happy Boys Happy"		original album	1:36
5.	"Things Are Going to Get Better"		original album	2:39
6.	"My Way of Giving"		original album	1:59
7.	"Green Circles"	Marriott; Lane; O'Sullivan	original album	2:46
8.	"Become Like You"		original album	1:58
9.	"Get Yourself Together"		original album	2:16
10.	"All Our Yesterdays"		original album	1:53
11.	"Talk to You"		original album	2:09
12.	"Show Me the Way"		original album	2:08
13.	"Up the Wooden Hills to Bedfordshire"	McLagan	original album	2:05
14.	"Eddie's Dreaming"	Marriott; Lane; McLagan	original album	2:54
15.	"Just Passing"		B-side of 'I Can't Make It', 1967	1:13
16.	"Itchycoo Park"		Single A-side, 1967	2:51
17.	"Here Come the Nice"		Single A-side, 1967	3:01
18.	"Don't Burst My Bubble"	Marriott; Lane; McLagan	previously unreleased	2:23
19.	"Things Are Going to Get Better" (Alternate version)		previously unreleased	2:32
20.	"I Can't Make It"		Single A-side, 1967	3:06
21.	"Green Circles" (Alternate take 2)	Marriott; Lane; O'Sullivan	previously unreleased	2:42
22.	"Tin Soldier"		Single A-side, 1967	3:06
23.	"(If You Think You're) Groovy" (Backing track)		previously unreleased	3:09
Total length:				54:27

== Personnel ==
Small Faces

- Steve Marriott – lead, harmony, and backing vocals, guitars, piano on "Things Are Going to Get Better" and "Show Me the Way"
- Ronnie Lane – lead, harmony, and backing vocals, bass guitar
- Kenney Jones – drums, percussion
- Ian McLagan – lead, harmony, and backing vocals, keyboards, bass guitar on "Show Me the Way", guitar and bass guitar on "Up the Wooden Hills to Bedfordshire"

Technical

- Glyn Johns, George Chkiantz, Eddie Kramer – studio engineers
- Stephen Hill – cover design
- Stephen Bobroff – photography

== Charts ==
Weekly chart performance for Small Faces
Chart (1967–1970)	Peak position
Australian Kent Music Report Albums Chart	25
UK Disc and Music Echo Top Ten LPs	6
UK Melody Maker Top Ten LPs	10
UK New Musical Express Top 15 LPs	11
UK Record Retailer LPs Chart	12

== See also ==
- Small Faces discography
