= Talk to You =

1967 song by Small Faces

- UK single B-side

Single by Small Faces

from the album Small Faces
- A-side: "Here Come the Nice"
- Released: 2 June 1967
- Recorded: 16 January 1967
- Studio: Olympic, London
- Genre: Hard rock; psychedelic rock; rhythm and blues
- Length: 2:09
- Label: Immediate
- Songwriters: Marriott; Lane
- Producers: Steve Marriott; Ronnie Lane

Small Faces singles chronology
"Patterns" (1967)	"Here Come the Nice" / "Talk to You" (1967)	"Itchycoo Park" (1967)

"Talk to You" is a song by English rock band Small Faces. It was recorded in 1967 and issued as the B-side of "Here Come the Nice" that peaked at number 12 on the UK Singles Chart.

== Song profile ==
The song "Talk to you" is a song written and composed by the band's primary songwriters Steve Marriott and Ronnie Lane. Initially, the track was released as the B-side of "Here Come the Nice", the band's eighth official single, and their first on Immediate, whom they signed and transferred to from previous label Decca in 1967. However, it was not intended to be the B-Side, that instead being "Green Circles". For unknown reasons however, this was cancelled.

Three weeks later, the song was issued on the group's eponymous second studio album (not to be confused with the Small Faces' debut album of the same name) on 23 June 1967. Furthermore, the song was included on the group's belatedly released US album There Are But Four Small Faces on 17 March 1968. It was the opening track for an Immediate Records boxset.

It is based on a distorted guitar riff played by Marriott and could be classified as hard rock; a genre the band would further experiment with during their later years, most notably on the single "Tin Soldier", and "Song of a Baker", a track from the 1968 album Ogdens' Nut Gone Flake. As with many other songs by the band, it was recorded at Olympic Studios in London. The song’s subject matter sounds as if it was inspired by Marriott’s relationship with model, Chrissie Shrimpton.

Yeah, "Talk to You" is a great song, they're all great songs. All those songs are great. When you've got great material, you can really play great, really do something to it. When you've got songs that are just ordinary, you've got to really search yourself to find something to do with it. It should be natural.

— Kenney Jones, Small Faces Talk To You: The story of the Small Faces in their own words

In the song, the singer wants to talk to his girl but such is her fame he can’t get past the doorman outside her flat who mistakes him for a fan. Marriott created a contagious groove for these words and then inserted several shouts and chants to lend the song a distinct sexuality.

== Personnel ==
- Steve Marriott - electric guitar, lead vocals
- Ronnie Lane - bass guitar, backing vocals
- Ian McLagan - hammond organ, piano, backing vocals
- Kenney Jones - drums, percussion

== References/Notes ==
=== References ===
- Hewitt, Paolo; Hellier, John (2004). Steve Marriott: All Too Beautiful... Helter Skelter Publishing. ISBN 1-900924-44-7.
