= Ogdens' Nut Gone Flake =

Studio album by Small Faces
- Released: 24 May 1968
- Studios: Olympic and Trident, London
- Genre: Psychedelia
- Length: 38:27
- Label: Immediate
- Producers: Ronnie Lane; Steve Marriott

Small Faces chronology
| Small Faces (1967) | Ogdens' Nut Gone Flake (1968) | In Memoriam (1969) |

Small Faces North American chronology
| There Are But Four Small Faces (1968) | Ogdens' Nut Gone Flake (1968) | Playmates (1977) |

Singles from Ogdens' Nut Gone Flake
- 1. "Lazy Sunday" Released: 5 April 1968; 2. "Afterglow of Your Love" Released: 7 March 1969; 3. "Mad John" Released: 1969 (US only)

Ogdens' Nut Gone Flake is the third studio album, and only concept album by the English rock band Small Faces. Released on 24 May 1968, the LP peaked at number one in the UK on the Record Retailer LPs Chart, where it remained for six weeks. It became the group's final studio album during their original incarnation (and the last album to contain solely new material until the release of reunion album Playmates in 1977). The album title and distinctive packaging design was a parody of Ogden's Nut-brown Flake, a brand of tinned tobacco that was produced in Liverpool from 1899 by Thomas Ogden.

== Background ==
Side one of the album showcases a variety of musical styles. The opening title track is an instrumental re-working of "I've Got Mine", a failed single from 1965. This recording uses a Hammond Organ treated with wah-wah pedal and orchestral flourishes from a string section led by David McCallum Senior (the father of The Man from U.N.C.L.E. star David McCallum.). An eclectic selection of tracks follow; the proto-Hard rock of "Song of a Baker"; (Note: The Song of a Baker was inspired by both a book of Sufi wisdom given to Ronnie Lane by Pete Townshend of The Who that addressed, "how hard you'll work if you're hungry", and also by Lane's visits to Ibiza where a neighbour used to bake bread in his traditional Balearic bread oven.) the psychedelic ballad "Long Agos And Worlds Apart"; cockney knees-up songs "Lazy Sunday" and "Rene" (the latter featuring a lengthy psychedelic jam as its coda); and the intense, soul-influenced ballad "Afterglow" (titled "Afterglow of Your Love" on the subsequent single and some compilations). The single version of "Afterglow" - released in March 1969 a year after it was recorded and immediately after the group's disbandment was officially announced - was presented in a radically-different mix that eschewed the LP version's acoustic opening, altered the song's tempo and extended the instrumental coda.

Side two of the LP is based on an original fairy tale concept about a boy called Happiness Stan, consisting of a musical suite of six songs interlinked with narration provided by comic monologuist and performer Stanley Unwin in his unique, nonsensical private language of "Unwinese". Unwin was not the band's first choice for narrator, however – originally they approached the popular but mercurial absurdist comedian Spike Milligan to narrate the piece, but negotiations with Milligan floundered early and the more affable and amenable Unwin stepped in to everyone's eventual satisfaction. Unwin spent time observing the band at work and at play in the studio, and picking up on the private, coded language they used amongst themselves, he incorporated it alongside contemporary slang into his inventive and surreal narrative.

The fairy tale follows Happiness Stan in his quest to find the 'missing' half of the moon, after seeing the moon at half-phase in the sky one night and misinterpreting the physics involved. Along the way, he saves a fly from starvation, and in gratitude the insect tells him of a wise man who can answer his question and also tell him the philosophy of life itself. Conveniently possessed of magic powers, Stan intones, "If all the flies were one fly, what a great enormous fly-follolloper that would bold!" and the fly duly grows to gigantic proportions. Seated on the giant fly's back, Stan undertakes a psychedelic journey to the cave of Mad John the Hermit, who explains that the moon's disappearance is only temporary, and demonstrates by pointing out that Stan has spent so long on his quest that the moon is now full again. He then sings Stan a cheerful song about the meaning of life.

The concept for side two of the album was conceived during a boating trip on the river Thames that the band undertook to relax and recuperate after a disastrous January 1968 tour of Australia and New Zealand, when bassist/vocalist Ronnie Lane noted in a moment of relaxed contemplation that the half-phase moon in the sky appeared to have had half of its surface removed. Lane and vocalist/guitarist Steve Marriott then conceived the idea of an uncomplicated and unworldly character called Happiness Stan embarking upon a naive but heroic quest to recover this supposed 'missing' half of the moon, but discovering the secret of happiness and 'the meaning of life itself' instead. The character of 'Happiness Stan' was reportedly named after Lane's older brother Stanley, rather than after Stanley Unwin. 'Happiness', meanwhile, was a promotional keyword of the Immediate record label, with their 'Happy to be part of the industry of human happiness' slogan.

== Recording ==
The recording of Ogdens' Nut Gone Flake spanned approximately five months, with most of the work done in early 1968 at Olympic Studios in Barnes, London. The earliest recording that may have been aimed toward inclusion on the album was a track entitled "Call It Something Nice", recorded on 21 October 1967 at Olympic. The song itself was an uncharacteristically slow and heavy number with a doleful, contemplative lyric that presaged the group's eventual move toward the harder, more rock-oriented sound of later songs like "Wham Bam Thank You Ma'am" and Steve Marriott's work with his next group, Humble Pie. The track did not ultimately appear on the album, however, eventually only seeing release on the posthumous compilation The Autumn Stone more than two years later in November 1969.

Recording continued through the remainder of 1967, with a session in November that yielded the outwardly more whimsical "I Feel Much Better" (which saw prompt release in December as the b-side of the band's "Tin Soldier" UK single), and another session in December backing Immediate labelmate P.P. Arnold on her solo single, the Marriott/Lane song "(If You Think You're) Groovy". Other versions of the track were cut, including the Small Faces' own take with Steve Marriott on solo lead vocal which was earmarked for their forthcoming album, but this version was ultimately left unreleased and is now considered to be lost.

After the group returned from their ill-fated tour of Oceania with the Who in January 1968, recording sessions for the album began in earnest through February and March at Olympic, with Glyn Johns at the recording desk. Recording began on two tracks intended for a future single, but ultimately not released in this format: another Marriott/Lane original, "Rollin' Over" (initially titled "Bun in the Oven") was the projected A-side, with a cover version of "Every Little Bit Hurts", as the B-side. Written by Ed Cobb and made famous by Brenda Holloway, the latter track - a slow, soulful ballad - features Marriott on piano instead of his usual guitar, and Ian McLagan on Hammond organ. This track was not released at the time and did not officially appear until the early 1990s, although a longer live version would appear on The Autumn Stone in 1969. "Rollin' Over" - another heavy rock workout - would be worked on further however, with Marriott tracking two attempts at a new lead vocal - one take appearing on the mono single release and the other on the stereo album release. Marriott also duets with himself on the verses, singing both harmonies. The mono version of "Rollin' Over" would later be released as the b-side of the "Lazy Sunday" single in the UK, while the stereo version found itself incorporated into the musical suite on side two of the LP.

At some point during the sessions the group also cut a cover version of the Ronettes' "Be My Baby" - a track which, in contemporary interviews in the UK music press preceding the LP's release, was declared by Marriott to be included on side one. Although an early version of the LP that included this track was alleged to exist in acetate form, by the time of the LP's release in May the track had been excised and remained unreleased. Like the band's own version of "If You Think You're Groovy", it is now thought to be lost. One of the few songs not recorded at Olympic Studios for the LP was the track "The Journey", recorded at Trident Studios in London in February (with Ronnie Lane and Steve Marriott switching their usual instruments to play guitar and bass, respectively). Album sessions wrapped on 3 April (two days before the release of the "Lazy Sunday" / "Rollin' Over" single) at Olympic with the recording of "Mad John", and the out-take "A Collibosher" (which was again later released on the posthumous compilation The Autumn Stone). As was usual for Immediate label recordings at this time, other artists on the label's roster such as P.P. Arnold, Billy Nicholls, flautist Lyn Dobson and numerous other session players made uncredited vocal and musical contributions to the album.

Mixing of the album was completed by Marriott and Lane through April and May at Trident Studios, with the LP arriving in record shops on 24 May 1968. The 5 April release of "Lazy Sunday" as the album's lead single, meanwhile, had come as a surprise to the band who had not been consulted over the choice, and Marriott in particular was displeased by it at a time when he wanted the group to be taken more seriously as musicians. He later claimed that had he been consulted, he would have chosen "Afterglow" to continue in the less frivolous vein of their previous hit "Tin Soldier". Despite Marriott's displeasure, the band and P.P. Arnold appeared in session on BBC Radio One's Top Gear show in April to dutifully promote their new single and the forthcoming album. They performed a version of Lazy Sunday alongside three otherwise unreleased cover versions: a new performance of "Every Little Bit Hurts", an instrumental cover version of the Temptations' "Get Ready", and an intense, rock-oriented cover of Tim Hardin's "If I Were A Carpenter" (with the exception of "Get Ready" the session was later officially released on a Small Faces BBC Sessions collection in the year 2000). In late May after the album's release, the Small Faces recorded another similarly intense (but more downbeat) cover of Hardin's "Red Balloon" at Olympic, which later saw release on "The Autumn Stone" LP.

The new album's musical and technical complexities, coupled with Small Faces live shows being still mostly confined to shorter sets as part of shared bills with other artists, meant that Ogden's Nut Gone Flake was never performed live on stage in its entirety – only "Lazy Sunday", "Rollin' Over" and "Song Of a Baker" appeared as part of their live sets. The Happiness Stan suite was performed as a whole only once, on the BBC television programme Colour Me Pop on Friday 21 June 1968, and even then it was not performed totally live. Songs featured were "Song of a Baker", "Happiness Stan", "Rollin' Over", "The Hungry Intruder", "The Journey", "Mad John" and "Happydaystoytown". Although the band mimed playing their instruments to the original studio recordings, their microphones were left on to capture their live vocals and ad-libs.

== Design and packaging ==
The album was originally released on vinyl in a circular novelty package of a metal replica of a giant tobacco tin, inside which was a poster created with five connected paper circles with pictures of the band members. This proved too expensive and not successful as the tins tended to roll off of shelves and it was quickly followed by a paper/card replica with a gatefold cover. Two limited-edition CD releases (including a three-disc deluxe edition in 2006 that included the original mono mix of the album on CD for the first time) went even further by packaging the disc(s) in a circular tin (as the original vinyl release had). Most CD releases use conventional packaging, superimposing the circular artwork on a square booklet.

The award-winning artwork for the album was produced by Nick Tweddell and Pete Brown, who were art school friends of Ian Mclagan and who had also played in a band with Mclagan called the Muleskinners. Album cover illustration was by Harry Willock, 1969 D&AD Silver Award winning album cover. Early pressings of XTC's The Big Express (1984) were similarly packaged in a round sleeve in tribute to the Small Faces album. It was ranked number 21 on Rolling Stone's 100 Classic Album Covers in 1991.

== Controversy ==
To promote the album, Immediate Records issued an advertisement that parodied the Lord's Prayer. This caused an uproar in the British press, and outraged readers wrote in to voice their anger. It read:

Small Faces
Which were in the studios
Hallowed by thy name
Thy music come
Thy songs be sung
On this album as they came from your heads
We give you this day our daily bread
Give us thy album in a round cover as we give thee 37/9d
Lead us into the record stores
And deliver us Ogdens' Nut Gone Flake
For nice is the music
The sleeve and the story
For ever and ever, Immediate

Regarding the advert, Steve Marriott said, "We didn't know a thing about the ad until we saw it in the music papers. And frankly we got the horrors at first. We realize that it could be taken as a serious knock against religion. But on thinking it over, we don't feel it is particularly good or bad. It's just another form of advertising. We're not all that concerned about it. We're more concerned in writing our music and producing our records."

== Vinyl and CD versions ==
The original vinyl album includes a segue between the end of "Afterglow" and the beginning of "Long Agos And Worlds Apart". Most CD editions have a different stereo mix, and use a version of "Afterglow" without the segue. There is also a segue between "Long Agos and Worlds Apart" and "Rene", and this is retained on the CD. Some CD editions also include one or more bonus tracks.

The US Immediate vinyl LP looked the same as the British original, but was printed on flimsy paper stock. The CBS/Immediate issue was always sold in a plastic bag with a foldover snap. The sound on the US release was not as bright as the UK release or most subsequent CD issues.

In 1989, Castle Communications released a single disc commemorative "tobacco tin" version that included a 'live' version of Tin Soldier as well as several table coasters replicating the cover.

The 2006 Castle Music/Sanctuary Records 3-disc "tobacco tin" Special Edition includes fully remastered mono and stereo mixes complete with segue, plus an episode of the BBC Radio documentary series Classic Albums in which the band discuss the making of the album. A second 3-disc Deluxe Edition was released in 2012 on Charly Records, this time, overseen by surviving band members Ian McLagan and Kenney Jones, and featured newly remastered mono and stereo mixes complete with segue, with the third disc full of outtakes and alternative takes, versions and mixes, including some specially mixed from newly discovered original session tapes. In countries other than the UK, however, the 2012 3-disc version was a limited edition and was replaced a year later by a two CD version with conventional packaging, and the stereo mix is omitted completely from the package.

In 2018 the album was reissued in a deluxe 50th anniversary edition that included the full 2012 3-disc version and a DVD that included the Colour Me Pop performance.

On many reissues, the cover design still spells the title as Ogdens' , but the label and sleeve copy gives it as Ogden's.

The vinyl LP was reissued in 2015 for Record Store Day.

== Reception ==
Professional ratings
Review scores
| Source | Rating |
|---|---|
| AllMusic | 5/5 stars |
| Mojo | 5/5 stars |
| The Rolling Stone Record Guide (1st ed, 1979) | 4/5 stars |
| The New Rolling Stone Record Guide (2nd ed, 1983) | 4/5 stars |
| The Rolling Stone Album Guide (3rd ed, 1992) | 4/5 stars |
| Rolling Stone | (favourable) |
| Encyclopedia of Popular Music | 4/5 stars |
| Uncut | 4/5 stars |

In 2000 Q magazine placed Ogdens' Nut Gone Flake at number 59 in its list of the 100 Greatest British Albums Ever. The album was featured in the book 1001 Albums You Must Hear Before You Die. Rolling Stone gave the album a positive review.

It was voted number 337 in the third edition of Colin Larkin's All Time Top 1000 Albums (2000).

== In other media ==
The title track was played during the debut trailer for the video game Grand Theft Auto V and was later featured on the in-game Los Santos Rock Radio station.

== Track listing ==
All songs written by Marriott and Lane, except where noted.

Discs one and three of the deluxe edition contain the original album in stereo and mono, respectively.

Side one
| No. | Title | Writer(s) | Length |
|---|---|---|---|
| 1. | "Ogdens' Nut Gone Flake" | Marriott, Lane, McLagan, Jones | 2:26 |
| 2. | "Afterglow" | | 3:31 |
| 3. | "Long Agos and Worlds Apart" | McLagan | 2:35 |
| 4. | "Rene" | | 4:29 |
| 5. | "Song of a Baker" | | 3:15 |
| 6. | "Lazy Sunday" | | 3:05 |

Side two (titled "Happiness Stan")
| No. | Title | Writer(s) | Length |
|---|---|---|---|
| 1. | "Happiness Stan" | | 2:35 |
| 2. | "Rollin' Over" | | 2:50 |
| 3. | "The Hungry Intruder" | Marriott, Lane, McLagan | 2:15 |
| 4. | "The Journey" | Marriott, Lane, McLagan, Jones | 4:12 |
| 5. | "Mad John" | | 2:48 |
| 6. | "HappyDaysToyTown" | Marriott, Lane, McLagan, Jones | 4:17 |

Immediate Deluxe edition disc 2
| No. | Title | Length |
|---|---|---|
| 1. | "Ogdens' Nut Gone Flake" (early session version) | 2:29 |
| 2. | "Afterglow" (alternate USA mix) | 3:01 |
| 3. | "Long Agos and Worlds Apart" (alternate USA mix) | 2:33 |
| 4. | "Rene, the Docker's Delight" (early session mix) | 4:28 |
| 5. | "Song of a Baker" (alternate USA mix) | 2:58 |
| 6. | "Lazy Sunday" (alternate USA mix) | 3:04 |
| 7. | "Happiness Stan" (backing track) | 2:58 |
| 8. | "Bun in the Oven" (early session mix) | 2:12 |
| 9. | "The Fly" (take 4 instrumental version) | 2:00 |
| 10. | "Mad John" (take 7 session version) | 2:18 |
| 11. | "HappyDaysToyTown" (alternate USA mix) | 4:17 |
| 12. | "Kamikhazi" (take 7 backing track) | 2:15 |
| 13. | "Every Little Bit Hurts" (early session mix) | 3:56 |
| 14. | "Ogdens' Nut Gone Flake" (alternate take phased mix) | 2:25 |

2007 Charly Records re-release bonus tracks
| No. | Title | Writer(s) | Length |
|---|---|---|---|
| 13. | "Here Come the Nice" | | 3:02 |
| 14. | "Talk to You" (Marriot, Lane, O'Sullivan) | | 2:05 |
| 15. | "My Way of Giving" | | 1:57 |
| 16. | "The Universal" | | 2:40 |
| 17. | "Donkey Rides, a Penny a Glass" (Alternate mix with brass) | Marriott, Lane, McLagan | 3:08 |
| 18. | "Itchycoo Park" | | 2:48 |
| 19. | "I'm Only Dreaming" | | 2:23 |
| 20. | "(Tell Me) Have You Ever Seen Me" | | 2:12 |
| 21. | "The Autumn Stone" (Marriott) | | 3:56 |
| 22. | "Wham Bam, Thank You Mam" (with guide vocal) | | 3:21 |
| 23. | "(If You Think You're) Groovy" (with P.P. Arnold) | | 2:56 |
| 24. | "Don't Burst My Bubble" | | 2:24 |
| 25. | "All or Nothing" (Live) | | 3:43 |
| 26. | "Tin Soldier" (Live) | | 3:22 |

== Personnel ==
Small Faces

- Steve Marriott − lead, harmony, and backing vocals, electric and acoustic guitars, harmonica, piano on "Happiness Stan" and "Every Little Bit Hurts", Hammond organ on "Ogdens' Nut Gone Flake", bass guitar on "The Journey", co-lead vocals on "The Hungry Intruder" and "HappyDaysToyTown"
- Ronnie Lane − harmony and backing vocals, bass guitar, electric guitar on "The Journey", upright bass on "Mad John", lead vocals on "Song of a Baker" and "The Journey", co-lead vocals on "The Hungry Intruder" and "HappyDaysToyTown"
- Ian McLagan − backing vocals, organ, piano, harpsichord, Mellotron, electric guitar and bass guitar on "Long Agos and Worlds Apart", lead vocals on "Long Agos and Worlds Apart"
- Kenney Jones − drums, percussion

with:

- Stanley Unwin – "looney links" (narration)
- Glyn Johns – recording engineer

And featuring uncredited contributions from:

- P. P. Arnold – backing vocals
- Billy Nicholls – backing vocals
- Lyn Dobson – flute
- unidentified string section conducted by David McCallum Sr.

== Charts ==
| Chart (1968) | Peak position |
|---|---|
| Finnish Albums (The Official Finnish Charts) | 5 |
| German Albums (Offizielle Top 100) | 6 |
| Norwegian Albums (VG-lista) | 13 |
| UK Albums (Official Charts) | 1 |
| US Billboard 200 | 159 |

| Chart (2014) | Peak position |
|---|---|
| French Albums (SNEP) | 132 |

| Chart (2018) | Peak position |
|---|---|
| UK Independent Albums (Official Charts) | 6 |
| Scottish Albums (Official Charts) | 53 |

== Certifications ==
| Region | Certification | Certified units/sales |
|---|---|---|
| United Kingdom (BPI) 2012 release | Gold | 100,000^{^} |
^{^} Shipments figures based on certification alone.
