= There Are But Four Small Faces =

Studio album by Small Faces
- Released: February 1968
- Recorded: October 1966 – November 1967
- Studios: Olympic, London
- Genres: Pop; rock
- Length: 30:18
- Label: Immediate/CBS
- Producers: Ronnie Lane; Steve Marriott

Small Faces North American chronology
There Are But Four Small Faces (1968)	Ogdens' Nut Gone Flake (1968)

Singles from There Are But Four Small Faces
- 1. "Here Come the Nice" / "Talk to You" Released: July 1967; 2. "Itchycoo Park" / "I'm Only Dreaming" Released: September 1967; 3. "Tin Soldier" / "I Feel Much Better" Released: February 1968

Professional ratings
Review scores
Source	Rating
AllMusic	5/5 stars

There Are But Four Small Faces is a studio album by the English rock band Small Faces, released in February 1968 through Immediate Records and distributed by CBS Records. It was the band's first LP release in the United States, and is a modified version of the UK album Small Faces, which came out the previous year. There Are But Four combines tracks from the UK album with the standalone singles "Itchycoo Park" (the group's only US hit), "Here Come the Nice" and "Tin Soldier", and their respective B-sides.

== Album profile ==
The album omitted "Something I Want to Tell You", "Feeling Lonely", "Happy Boys Happy", "Things Are Going to Get Better", "Become Like You", "All Our Yesterdays" and "Eddie's Dreaming", which were all found on the Small Faces album in the United Kingdom. Since these tracks weren't featured on another album issued in the US at the time, they became rare collectibles until Sire Records issued a double album titled The Immediate Story in 1975. On CD, these tracks were issued on deluxe editions of Small Faces in the 1980s.

These tracks were substituted by the singles "Here Come the Nice", "Itchycoo Park" and "Tin Soldier", all of which had seen releases as singles in both the US and the UK to various success. The album also features the B-Sides "I'm Only Dreaming" and "I Feel Much Better", which backed "Itchycoo Park" and "Tin Soldier" respectively.

There Are remains the sole Small Faces album that was released exclusively in North America; the follow-up Ogdens' Nut Gone Flake remains the same as the UK issue, although with lacking sound quality. Faces' debut album First Step is credited to Small Faces on its USA release, but credited to Faces in the UK; however, the track listings on both these releases are the same (although there are brief edits to two tracks on the USA version).

Upon its initial release, the record failed to reach the charts; however, it charted very briefly after the song "Itchycoo Park" was a top 20 hit on the Billboard Hot 100 in January 1968. The album consequently became a moderate success, managed to reach the Billboard 200 for three weeks, and peaked at number 178 in March 1968. It was the first of two Small Faces albums to chart in the US; the other one was Ogdens' Nut Gone Flake which reached number 159.

During the success of "Itchycoo Park", stickers stating 'Includes Itchycoo Park' were added to the album sleeve, something that hadn't been present on earlier pressings. The album was published in Venezuela in the year 1968 on the Odeon label. This version had a remarkably different running order than the versions released in the US, most notably the inclusion of "Lazy Sunday", a single released in April 1968.

== Track listing ==
All tracks written by Steve Marriott and Ronnie Lane unless noted. The track listing below is adapted from initial US pressings.

Side One
No.	Title	Writer(s)	Lead vocals	Length
1.	"Itchycoo Park"		Steve Marriott	2:44
2.	"Talk to You"		Marriott	2:05
3.	"Up the Wooden Hills" (*)	Ian McLagan	Ian McLagan	2:00
4.	"My Way of Giving"		Marriott	1:52
5.	"I'm Only Dreaming"		Marriott	2:21
6.	"I Feel Much Better"	Marriott; Lane; McLagan	Ronnie Lane with Marriott	3:55
Total length:				14:57

Side Two
No.	Title	Writer(s)	Lead vocals	Length
7.	"Tin Soldier"		Marriott	3:16
8.	"Get Yourself Together"		Marriott	2:17
9.	"Show Me the Way"		Lane	2:05
10.	"Here Come The Nice"		Marriott with Lane	2:54
11.	"Green Circles"	Marriott; Lane; Michael O'Sullivan	Lane with Marriott	2:34
12.	"(Tell Me) Have You Ever Seen Me?"		Marriott	2:15
Total length:				15:21

*The song was titled 'Up the Wooden Hills to Bedfordshire' on the group's 1967 album; On the US album the 'to Bedfordshire' part is absent.

== Personnel ==
Small Faces

- Steve Marriott – lead, harmony, and backing vocals, guitars, piano on "Show Me the Way"
- Ronnie Lane – lead, harmony, and backing vocals, bass guitar
- Ian McLagan – lead, harmony, and backing vocals, keyboards, bass guitar on "Show Me the Way", guitar and bass guitar on "Up the Wooden Hills"
- Kenney Jones – drums, percussion

Additional appearances

- P.P. Arnold – backing vocals on "Itchycoo Park", "I Feel Much Better" and "Tin Soldier"

== Charts ==
Chart (1968)	Peak position
US Billboard 200	178

== See also ==
- Small Faces (1967 album)
- Small Faces discography
