= (Tell Me) Have You Ever Seen Me? =

Song by English rock band Small Faces

Song by the Small Faces

from the album From the Beginning & Small Faces
- Released: 2 June 1967 (Decca version); 23 June 1967 (Immediate version)
- Recorded: August, 10 October 1966; February – April 1967
- Studio: IBC, London; Olympic, London
- Genre: Power pop; psychedelic pop; R&B
- Length: 2:16
- Label: Decca; Immediate
- Songwriters: Steve Marriott; Ronnie Lane
- Producers: John Pantry; Steve Marriott; Ronnie Lane

"(Tell Me) Have You Ever Seen Me?" (also known as "Tell Me Have You Ever Seen Me?" or "Have You Ever Seen Me?") is a song by English rock band Small Faces. It has a complicated release history and was issued by both Decca and Immediate Records in 1967. The track apparently had a working title of "Mystery" in 1966. Initially planned as the Small Faces debut single on Immediate in mid-1967, it was shelved due to threats from Decca.

== Song profile ==
In an interview for Saturday Club, Ronnie Lane stated that he came up with the song after listening to some tracks off of the group's eponymous debut album in reverse. It was recorded in the same sessions as "My Mind's Eye", "That Man", and "Yesterday, Today and Tomorrow". Footage of them recording the backing instrumental of the song on 10 October 1966 was used in part of a BBC documentary called The Managers regarding feuds between the Rolling Stones manager Andrew Loog Oldham and Small Faces' Don Arden.

"If I've ever exploited anyone it's for their own benefit, it's because they want to be exploited. I've never exploit anybody who doesn't want to be exploited."

— Don Arden, BBC documentary, 1966

The song was first issued on 2 June 1967 when the compilation album From the Beginning was released, this album contains unreleased recordings and other hit recordings from the band's earlier output. This version was released by Decca and is thought to be a demo for British singer Chris Farlowe. A revamped version was included as the opening track on the group's second studio album Small Faces on 23 June 1967. This version was released by Immediate and was used as the closing track for There Are But Four Small Faces, the group's album released exclusively in the US.

The principal difference between the two versions is that the Decca version has a slower tempo than the Immediate, and that the Immediate version has a different vocal track. The Decca rendering was released exclusively in mono sound (as with all Small Faces' work on Decca), while the Immediate one was mixed in both stereo and mono. There are thought to exist 4 versions of the song, these are the two aforementioned versions, one on the deluxe edition of From the Beginning, and the last on the deluxe edition of Small Faces. Instrumentally, there's no difference, as these are only different vocal takes.

One of the aforementioned outtakes were featured on The Decca Years, a box set of all Small Faces Decca recordings. The song was well-received upon release, and is considered one of the best songs on Small Faces. "(Tell Me) Have You Ever Seen Me?" was featured in German music magazine Musikexpress' list of "the 700 best songs of all time" at a position of number 568, where they write that "Marriott is in his best form". It was later featured on Here Come the Nice: The Immediate Years 1967-1969 on 27 January 2014.

The Immediate version "(Tell Me) Have You Ever Seen Me?" also demonstrates an early use of the mellotron, where the Mark II type was used, played by Ian McLagan. This instrument is absent from the Decca release, where the hammond organ instead dominates most of the sound. The track was later used as the B-side of a re-release of "Lazy Sunday" on 19 March 1976, almost 9 years after it was first issued.

== Personnel ==
- Steve Marriott - acoustic guitar, lead vocals
- Ronnie Lane - bass guitar, backing vocals
- Ian McLagan - hammond organ, mellotron, backing vocals
- Kenney Jones - drums, percussion

== The Apostolic Intervention version ==
"(Tell Me) Have You Ever Seen Me"

Single by The Apostolic Intervention
- B-side: "Madame Garcia"
- Released: 7 April 1967
- Recorded: March 1967
- Studio: Olympic, London
- Genre: Garage rock; freakbeat
- Length: 2:05
- Label: Immediate
- Songwriters: Steve Marriott; Ronnie Lane
- Producers: Steve Marriott; Ronnie Lane

British rock band the Apostolic Intervention took interest in Steve Marriott, who liked their sound and persuaded Andrew Loog Oldham to sign them. Marriott would then subsequently offer "(Tell Me) Have You Ever Seen Me" to them, much to Ronnie Lane's dismay. Bass guitarist Bob Argent was unable to play for the session, and his role was taken over by Marriott, who also produced it with Lane. The B-side "Madame Garcia" was recorded in the same session and was likewise penned and produced by Marriott and Lane, the former whom is featured as a backing vocalist.

The single was released on 7 April 1967, but failed to chart on the UK Singles Chart. This is most likely due to the fact that the single was not promoted, and only released by Immediate to escape Decca's legal action. Further work by them resulted in nothing, and they would split by the end of 1967. Drummer Jerry Shirley would again collaborate with Marriott, joining him in Humble Pie.

== Other versions ==
- The Stillroven covered it as "Have You Ever Seen Me" and released it as a single in 1968. It became the group's final single release before their breakup.
- A cover appears on Gumball's 1992 extended play Wisconsin Hayride.

== Bibliography ==
- Hewitt, Paolo; Hellier, John (2004). Steve Marriott: All Too Beautiful... Helter Skelter. ISBN 1-900924-44-7.
- Markesich, Mike (2012). Teen Beat Mayhem (1st ed.). Branford, Connecticut: Priceless Info Press. ISBN 978-0-9856482-5-1.
