= Small Faces (disambiguation) =

The Small Faces were an English rock and roll band from East London.

Small Faces may also refer to:

- Small Faces (1966 album), their debut released on Decca Records
- Small Faces (1967 album), their follow-up released on Immediate Records
- Small Faces (film), a 1996 Scottish film
