= Get Yourself Together =

1967 song by psychedelic rock group Small Faces

- Thai EP of the same name

Song by Small Faces

from the album Small Faces
- Released: 23 June 1967
- Recorded: 13 December 1966 – 28 February 1967
- Studio: IBC; Olympic Studios
- Genre: Psychedelic rock; pop; folk rock
- Length: 2:16
- Label: Immediate (UK); Columbia (US)
- Songwriters: Steve Marriott; Ronnie Lane
- Producers: Steve Marriott; Ronnie Lane

"Get Yourself Together" is a song by the English rock band Small Faces, first released in 1967. It was cut during their tenure on both Decca and Immediate Records in 1966 and 1967 and was written by the Marriott/Lane partnership, who wrote a majority of the Small Faces material. It is regarded as one of their best compositions. It remains one of their most popular efforts despite it not being released as single in the United Kingdom or the United States and has since been covered by other influential artists.

== Song profile ==
Recording of the song coincided with the recording of another track, namely "Green Circles", both of which were taped on 13 December 1966 at IBC Studios. Further work started in January and a final mix was completed the following month. It was first released on their eponymous second studio album Small Faces on 23 June 1967 in both mono and stereo versions. The album became a relative success, reaching number 12 on the UK Albums Chart. Despite this, Small Faces was not issued in America, and the song would not appear in the US until almost half a year later, when it was included on There Are But Four Small Faces on 1 December 1967. It was also the title track of an EP released in Thailand by TK Records.

During the recording at IBC Studios, John Pantry was the responsible studio engineer, whilst further work on the song was engineered by the Rolling Stones engineer Glyn Johns, being assisted by Eddie Kramer.

During the instrumental section of the song, audible laughter and incoherent vocals can be heard, they are more prominent in the stereo versions of the track, and more upfront on alternate mixes of the song found on Here Comes The Nice: Immediate Years box set 1967-69.

== Personnel ==
Personnel according to Here Comes The Nice: Immediate Years box set 1967-69.

Small Faces

- Steve Marriott – electric guitar, twelve-string acoustic guitar, lead and backing vocals
- Ronnie Lane – bass guitar, backing vocals
- Ian McLagan – piano, hammond organ, backing vocals
- Kenney Jones – drums, percussion

== The Jam renditions ==
"Get Yourself Together"

Song by the Jam

from the EP Live
- Released: 14 October 1983
- Recorded: 2 December 1982
- Venue: Wembley Arena
- Genre: Mod revival; punk rock
- Length: 2:11
- Label: Polydor
- Songwriters: Steve Marriott; Ronnie Lane

British mod revival group the Jam had incorporated the song into their live repertoire during the later part of their existence. A recorded version, dating back to December 1982 recorded at Wembley Arena appears on Live, a 4 track extended play that briefly accompanied their 1983 compilation album Snap!. For reasons unknown, the EP was withdrawn from production of the album to date. The EP remains one of the rarest releases by the Jam, and is seen as a collectible among fans, since the tracks have not appeared on other compilation albums released by the group.

A studio demo recorded for Peter Wilson was initially scrapped, but was later included on Extras, a compilation of rare and unissued material by the group. A stereo version was more recently released on the 2010 deluxe edition of the band's 1980 studio album Sound Affects.

Lead singer Paul Weller is known to be a fan of both the song and Small Faces.

== Covers and popular culture ==
- Danish rock group Astrays released a cover version of the song as a single, backed with a version of "My Back Pages" by Bob Dylan as a single during the later parts of 1967.
- Punk rock band BUM covered the song for their 1994 release I Am Superwoman.
- Henry's Dress, an American noise pop trio, released a version of the song on their 1996 album Bust 'em Green.
- It was performed live by Ian McLagan, Kenney Jones, Paul Weller and Noel Gallagher during the Steve Marriott Memorial Concert in 2001.
- Japanese ska band Potshot issued a version on their posthumous compilation album Potshot Forever: Best and Rarities.
- Ultimate Classic Rock placed the song at number ten on their list of Top Ten Small Faces Songs in 2012.
