= My Mind's Eye (song) =

- West German picture sleeve

Single by Small Faces
- B-side: "I Can't Dance with You"
- Released: 11 November 1966
- Recorded: 19–20 September 1966
- Studio: IBC, London
- Genre: Proto-psychedelia
- Length: 2:04
- Label: Decca
- Songwriters: Steve Marriott; Ronnie Lane
- Producer: Small Faces

Small Faces singles chronology
| "All or Nothing" (1966) | "My Mind's Eye" (1966) | "I Can't Make It" (1967) |

Promo film
- "My Mind's Eye" on YouTube

"My Mind's Eye" is a song by the English rock band Small Faces, written by the band's guitarist Steve Marriott and bassist Ronnie Lane. Despite several chart hits in the UK, the Small Faces had expressed dislike with their management under Don Arden, citing creative and financial differences. At the same time the band had started experimenting with various drugs, such as LSD, which reflected itself in several compositions written during this period, including "My Mind's Eye". Musically, "My Mind's Eye" leans towards psychedelic music, being one of the group's earliest compositions to do so. The song musically quotes the Christian hymn "Gloria in excelsis Deo" through various modern Christmas carols. Lyrically, the song is introspective and revolves around a man willing to forgive people ridiculing of his spiritual leanings. "My Mind's Eye" was recorded at IBC Studios in London during September 1966.

Though intended as an album track, Arden issued "My Mind's Eye" as a single in the UK on 11 November 1966 through Decca Records. The band felt the released version felt like a demo, so they polished the track by adding overdubs retrospectively. The single became a commercial success, reaching number four on Britain's Record Retailer chart in December, and additionally reached the top-ten in several European countries. Critical reception was initially positive, with the song's melody being praised. The reception from other musicians and the band itself was mixed. Retrospectively, "My Mind's Eye" has been considered a prelude to the band's later, more experimental songs. The Small Faces severed ties with Arden shortly after the single's release, causing a legal battle which culminated in the band signing with Immediate Records under Andrew Loog Oldham.

== Background ==
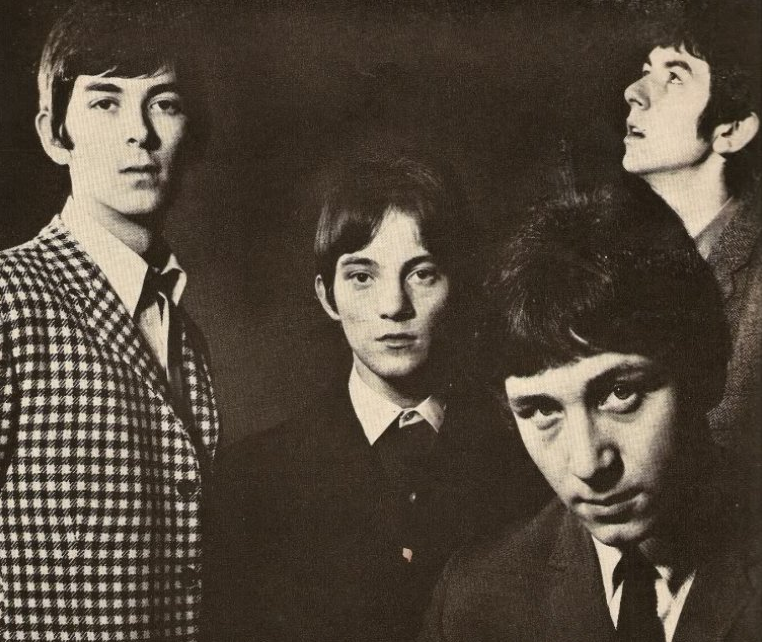
The Small Faces in 1966.

By September 1966, the Small Faces were one of the Britain's most commercially successful pop bands, having scored three top-ten singles on the Record Retailer chart with "Sha-La-La-La-Lee", "Hey Girl" and "All or Nothing" (all 1966), of which the latter became their sole number one single. (Note: Though "Sha-La-La-La-Lee" peaked at number three on the chart published by Record Retailer, it reached number one on the charts compiled by two of Britain's other music trade publications, Disc Weekly and Melody Maker.) At the time the band were managed by Don Arden, who had signed them directly to his production company Contemporary Music which leased their recordings for Decca Records to issue material in forms of singles and albums. Despite this apparent success, the members of Small Faces were beginning to "rebel against his [Don Arden's] paternal treatment" of them, partly due to Arden's artistic dismay over the Small Faces increased time in the recording studio, and partly as the band were paid roughly £1,000 per gig yet only received a £20 weekly wage from Arden.

In addition, the musical landscape had begun changing; although their earlier sound leaned towards a "blend of pop, soul, and 'freakbeat'", by 1966 the Small Faces had begun experimenting with drugs, such as LSD, cannabis and methamphetamines. (Note: Don Arden believed that drugs, in particular LSD, slowed down the Small Faces' work ethic.) The Small Faces were introduced to LSD through the Beatles manager Brian Epstein when he visited the band's Pimlico residence together with the Moody Blues drummer Graeme Edge, serving the band orange slices spiked with the drug. According to Bruce Eder, the members of the group had found "their work and sensibilities altered by" drugs, resulting in a particular bout of creativity by the band's singer and guitarist Steve Marriott and bassist Ronnie Lane during this period, coming up with more experimental songs such as "My Way of Giving", "Green Circles", "(Tell Me) Have You Ever Seen Me?" and "My Mind's Eye". (Note: According to drummer Kenney Jones, although credited to both Marriott and Lane, 99% of the band's self-written material up until 1967 was composed by Marriott alone. On the contrary, Alexis Petridis of The Guardian states that the lyrics of "My Mind's Eye" were written by Lane.)

== Composition and recording ==
Musically, critic Lindsay Planer identifies "My Mind' Eye" as a "poignant midtempo ballad". Marriott biographer Simon Spence notes "My Mind's Eye" as "LSD-tinged". Garry Mulholland from Uncut magazine calls the single "psych-lite", as does Erik Hage who distinguishes "My Mind's Eye" as the band's "earliest, most awkward stab at psychedelia". Hellier and Hewitt believe the track to be driven by its guitar riff. Lyrically, "My Mind's Eye" has been acknowledged as introspective, something the band wasn't "necessarily associated" with. The Guardian's Alexis Petridis considers "My Mind's Eye" to be the Small Faces' equivalent to the Beatles' B-side "Rain" (1966), as both are lyrically about "lysergic self-realisation". He juxtaposes the tracks, as Ronnie Lane is "forgiving the people sniggering at his newfound spiritual leanings", compared to John Lennon's sneer from a "position of enlightened superiority" in "Rain". He further adds that the lyrics were a direct influence from the party with Brian Epstein.

"My Mind's Eye" quotes the traditional Christian hymn "Gloria in excelsis Deo", through either the Christmas carols "Angels from the Realms of Glory", or "Ding Dong Merrily on High". The part quoted in "My Mind's Eye" is described as "fluidly sustained through 16 notes of a rising and falling melismatic melodic sequence". English Church hymns were a prominent source of inspiration for the band's music. Marriott admitted using part of "Gloria in Excelsis Deo" in an interview with Melody Maker, intended to directly promote the single. According to Marriott, he was certain that the original composer of the hymn would be "leaping about" in direct response to critical comments which stated he would "be turning in his grave". Petridis considered the quotation to give the composition an "oddly comforting and familiar" sound.

The Small Faces recorded "My Mind's Eye" during a nightly recording session at IBC Studios in London during 19–20 September 1966, together with a collection of other tracks that were intended for a prospective second studio album for Decca. John Pantry acted as the audio engineer. According to keyboardist Ian McLagan, although the recording session was led by Marriott and Lane, the entire group "were all equals in the studio". No session musicians were present during the session, and McLagan overdubbed various keyboard instruments in addition to his standard Hammond organ. According to Lane, a rough mix of "My Mind's Eye" had been made by four in the morning, and a demo tape had been delivered to Don Arden's office to "ram it down his throat that we were making full use of our studio time". Marriott stated that "My Mind's Eye" was one in a "bunch of demos" they had left Arden.

== Release and commercial performance ==
"My Mind's Eye" was released by Decca as a 7-inch single in the UK on 11 November 1966, backed by "I Can't Dance with You", a "moodier-soul workout. (Note: Catalogue number Decca F 12500.) The release of the single was not authorized by the Small Faces, with Planer stating that, "Decca simply took whatever demo the band had most recently been working on and pressed it up". On the contrary, other journalists have stated that Arden decided to release it, as he found the song coincidentally suitable for the Christmas rush, owing to its influences from Christmas carols. The Small Faces first learned of the single's release on their way home to London from a gig in Newcastle upon Tyne, when they were listening to the BBC Light Programme on the car's radio during a segment in which Marriott's ex-girlfriend Adrienne Posta was interviewed by Barry Aldis. After this incident, the band immediately drove to Arden's office on Carnaby Street, where their demands to overdub and re-record elements of "My Mind's Eye" were granted. The band had "augmented the vocals and remixed and properly balanced the frequency equalization", which yielded a more polished rendition of the track. (Note: Both the "demo" version and the "polished version" were released on the 7-inch single, only visually separated by different matrix indicators in the runout.)

Oh bollocks. So what?! It was as much my record as it was theirs. It belonged to me. I was paying 'em fucking royalties. I don't know what their thinking is. It's so difficult when you've got four guys rattling away all the time like old women, they were like four whores... 'and she said... and she said...'

— Don Arden about the release of "My Mind's Eye".

Despite being an unauthorized release, "My Mind's Eye" became a large hit in England, where it entered the Record Retailer chart on 23 November 1966 at a position of number 29, before peaking at number four for two weeks starting on 14 December. The single exited the chart on 1 February 1967, having spent 11 weeks on it. It also reached number four on the other singles charts published by the British trade magazines Disc and Music Echo, New Musical Express, and Melody Maker. "My Mind's Eye" also became a top-ten hit in several countries in Continental Europe, reaching number seven in Denmark, number eight in Ireland, and number nine in Sweden. The single fared best in Malaysia, where it reached number two behind the Beach Boys' "Good Vibrations". According to Record Retailer, "My Mind's Eye" was the 73rd best-selling single of 1966 in the UK, and one of three Small Faces singles to appear on the list, all of whom added to the Small Faces becoming the eleventh best-selling recording artist in Britain during 1966.

"My Mind's Eye" was initially planned as a track for the Small Faces planned second studio album, which had a prospective release date of November 1966, but instead got its first album appearance on From the Beginning on 2 June 1967. The album was an unauthorized release compiled by Arden, and "My Mind's Eye" is sequenced between their cover of Del Shannon's "Runaway" and the original composition "Yesterday, Today And Tomorrow". Since then, it has appeared on several compilation albums, including The Autumn Stone (1969), and the box set The Decca Years, which features both the early and "finished" version of "My Mind's Eye". An alternate mix, originally released on an extended play in France, was included on a 1990s re-issue of From the Beginning.

== Reception and legacy ==
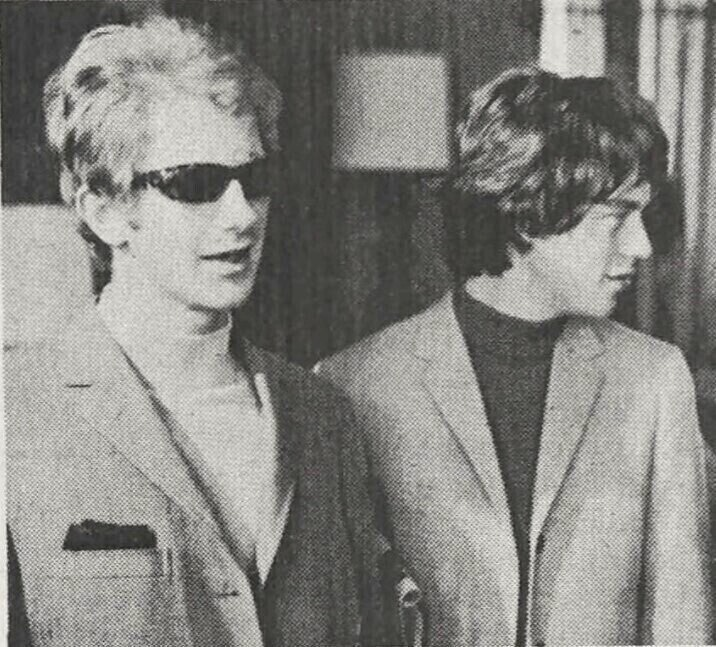
The release of "My Mind's Eye" culminated in the Small Faces signing with Andrew Loog Oldham's (left) label Immediate Records.

Writing for Disc and Music Echo, journalist Penny Valentine found "My Mind's Eye" to be the Small Faces' strongest commercial record", citing it as "intensively charming with loads of melody line", having previously found their records unmelodic. For her, the single proved the Small Faces were capable of "things other than noise". Derek Johnson of the New Musical Express compared "My Mind's Eye" to the simplicity of the Troggs' singles, distinguished by "fact that it has its own distinctive, strident guitar sound". As the song featured a melody "based upon progressions downwards through the scale" and a singalong conclusion, he felt the single "registers from the very first spin". Comparatively, criticism from contemporary musicians was more negative; Spencer Davis of the Spencer Davis Group found "My Mind's Eye" inferior to "All Or Nothing", and wished the band had done more with the "Gloria in excelsis Deo" quotation. Similarly, Keith Potger of the Seekers didn't find "My Mind's Eye" to sound like the Small Faces, preferring them to do "raving stuff".

The reception by the Small Faces members was more mixed. Drummer Kenney Jones found "My Mind's Eye" so commercial it reminded him of Christmas, but felt that the musical quotation was a "piss take". Steve Marriott, on the contrary, felt like "My Mind's Eye" was just "rubbish" they recorded because it was commercial and they knew it would sell. Planer found the song's melody to be "wistful" and believed the song's chorus boasted some "interesting chords", praising the vocal harmonies of Marriott, Lane, and McLagan. He additionally found the single to be one in a row of Small Faces tracks "that hint at the band's developing pop inclinations without abandoning their hard R&B underpinning". Petridis believed the song reflected the perspective of "the acid initiate staring back at the 'straight' world". Similarly, Stephen Thomas Erlewine also suggests that the final few singles the Small Faces released on Decca – including "My Mind's Eye" – hinted towards an eagerness to "shake off the confines of rock & soul".

"My Mind's Eye" was the catalyst for the Small Faces' future career. The band members were "infuriated" by its release, and agreed that they didn't want Arden involved with them anymore. The feud between the Small Faces and Don Arden culminated in Arden arranging a meeting with the band members' parents, during which he revealed they were using drugs, after which his grip on the band "significantly loosened". On 17 November 1966, a mere week after the single's release, they signed a new management contract with the Harold Davidson Agency. However, Arden invoked clauses in the band's contract, causing a legal battle to ensue for several months, until Andrew Loog Oldham from the independent record label Immediate Records was willing to purchase the Small Faces contract directly from Arden in February 1967 for £25,000.

== Personnel ==
Personnel according to the 2025 re-issue of The Autumn Stone.

- Steve Marriott – lead vocals, electric guitars
- Ronnie Lane – bass guitar, vocals
- Kenney Jones – drums, percussion
- Ian McLagan – Hammond organ, celeste, glockenspiel, vocals

== Charts ==
Weekly chart performance for "My Mind's Eye"
| Chart (1966–1967) | Peak position |
|---|---|
| Denmark (DR Top 20) | 7 |
| Ireland (RTÉ) | 8 |
| Malaysia (Radio Malaysia) | 2 |
| Netherlands (Dutch Top 40) | 15 |
| Netherlands (Single Top 100) | 13 |
| New Zealand (Listener) | 11 |
| Sweden (Kvällstoppen) | 17 |
| Sweden (Tio i Topp) | 9 |
| UK (Disc and Music Echo) | 4 |
| UK (New Musical Express) | 4 |
| UK (Melody Maker) | 4 |
| UK (Record Retailer) | 4 |
| West Germany (Media Control) | 24 |

== See also ==
Small Faces discography

== Sources ==
- Badman, Keith; Rawlings, Terry (1997). Quite Naturally the Small Faces: A Day by Day Guide to the Career of a Pop Group (1st ed.). United Kingdom: Cherry Red. ISBN 978-095-1720-66-0. OCLC 53709166.
- Caiger, Rob (2025). The Autumn Stone (CD). United Kingdom: Immediate. IMCD0102.
- Darlington, Andrew (2024). The Small Faces and The Faces: Every Album, Every Song (1st ed.). United Kingdom: SonicBond. ISBN 978-1-789524-18-5. OCLC 1525245655 – via Google Books.
- Hallberg, Eric (1993). Eric Hallberg presenterar Kvällstoppen i P3 [Eric Hallberg Presents Kvällstoppen on P3] (in Swedish) (1st ed.). Stockholm: Drift. ISBN 9-789-16-302-14-04. OCLC 186244613.
- Hallberg, Eric; Henningsson, Ulf (2012). Tio i Topp - med de utslagna "på försök" 1961–74 [Tio I Topp With The Eliminated On Try 1961–1974] (in Swedish) (2nd ed.). Stockholm: Premium. ISBN 978-91-89136-89-2. OCLC 939611828.
- Hellier, John; Hewitt, Paolo (2004). Steve Marriott: All Too Beautiful (1st ed.). United Kingdom: Helter Skelter. ISBN 1-900924-44-7. OCLC 936670338 – via Internet Archive.
- Hewitt, Paolo (1995). The Small Faces: The Young Mods' Forgotten Story (1st ed.). United Kingdom: Acid Jazz. ISBN 9-780-95-23-93-504. OCLC 846587830.
- Schmitt, Roland (2011). Small Faces and Other Stories (2nd ed.). United Kingdom: Bobcat. ISBN 9-780-85-712-451-7. OCLC 993110405.
- Spence, Simon (2021). All Or Nothing: The Authorized Story of Steve Marriott (1st ed.). United Kingdom: Omnibus Press. ISBN 978-1-787601-84-0. OCLC 1385300209 – via Internet Archive.
