= Green Circles =

1967 song by Small Faces

Song by the Small Faces

from the album Small Faces
- Released: 23 June 1967
- Recorded: 13 December 1966 – 28 February 1967
- Studio: IBC and Olympic, London
- Genre: Psychedelic rock; psychedelic pop; pop
- Length: 2:46
- Label: Immediate
- Songwriters: Steve Marriott; Ronnie Lane; Michael O'Sullivan
- Producers: Steve Marriott; Ronnie Lane

Performance on Beat-Club
- "Green Circles" on YouTube

"Green Circles" is a song by the English rock band Small Faces first recorded in 1966. While not issued as a single in the United Kingdom, it was originally intended as the B-Side of "Here Come the Nice", their first single release on Immediate Records, this release was cancelled and the B-Side was replaced with "Talk to You." It remains one of the group's most well known and influential songs, and showcases the group's venture into psychedelic music, which would be prevalent in their later work, such as on "Itchycoo Park", "Lazy Sunday" and Ogdens' Nut Gone Flake.

== Background and composition ==
"Green Circles" was composed by the Small Faces guitarist Steve Marriott, bassist Ronnie Lane and a friend of Marriott's, Michael "Mick" O'Sullivan. Drummer Kenney Jones recalled O'Sullivan as a "great laugh" and a "good personality" who was "always ready for a beer". (Note: Marriott had shared an apartment with O'Sullivan in 1965,, and he had by 1966 moved into the band's residence at 22 Westmoreland Terrace in London.) He is therefore listed as a writer for the song and became the only person not in the group to receive songwriting credits on the album.

Yeah, I suppose an acid trip, I dunno....yeah, Mick O'Sullivan, he lived with us at about that time. He even gets songwriting credit, I don't suppose he gets any money, though, either (laughs).

— Ian McLagan, Small Faces Talk to You: The story of the Small Faces in their own words

It was recorded on 13 December 1966 at IBC Studios at a session attended by Melody Maker journalist Nick Jones. The group resumed further work added at Olympic Studios on 28 February 1967, Olympic Studios was the same studio the band recorded most of their tracks while signed to Immediate. It was the last track on side one of the band's second studio album Small Faces and features Ronnie Lane on lead vocals. The song got its release in the US on the album There Are But Four Small Faces in March 1968.

Set in B-flat major (the same key as their single "Here Come the Nice"), the song is described as highly psychedelic, and it is about the topic of being visited by a enlightened stranger. The recording engineers for the track are John Pantry, Glyn Johns and George Chkiantz, who was responsible for the flanging effect both heard on this song, and later on "Itchycoo Park". Johns and Chkiantz were also featured as the recording engineers on most tracks of the album.

Small Faces made an appearance on Beat-Club on 23 September 1967, in which they mimed the song, along with "Itchycoo Park". Earlier versions can be found on the Here Comes The Nice boxset.

== Personnel ==
Personnel according to the 2014 box set Here Come the Nice: The Immediate Years Box Set 1967–1969 and the 2025 re-issue of The Autumn Stone.

Small Faces

- Ronnie Lane – lead vocals, bass guitar
- Steve Marriott – acoustic guitar, electric guitar, tubular bells, vocals
- Ian McLagan – piano, Hammond organ, Harpsichord, Mellotron, vocals
- Kenney Jones – drums, percussion

Technical

- John Pantry – audio engineer (IBC Studios)
- Glyn Johns – audio engineer (Olympic Studios)
- George Chkiantz – assistant audio engineer (Olympic Studios)

== In popular culture and covers ==
- The 1968 song "Hurdy Gurdy Man" by Donovan may have taken inspiration from the song, name in the similar vocal melody, and the topic of being visited by a stranger. In 2012, Donovan revealed that he had become friends with Small Faces in 1965.
- British pop duo Twice as Much covered the track for their second studio album That's All in 1968.
