= From the Beginning (Small Faces album) =

1967 compilation album by Small Faces

- 1996 CD reissue design

Compilation album by Small Faces
- Released: 2 June 1967
- Recorded: 1965–1967
- Studios: IBC, London
- Genres: Rock; pop; freakbeat; R&B
- Length: 43:47
- Language: English
- Label: Decca
- Producers: Ian Samwell; Kenny Lynch; Don Arden; Steve Marriott, Ronnie Lane

Small Faces chronology
Small Faces (Decca) (1966)	From the Beginning (1967)	Small Faces (Immediate) (1967)

Professional ratings
Review scores
Source	Rating
Allmusic	4.5/5 stars

From the Beginning is the first compilation album by the English rock band Small Faces. It was released by Decca Records of group material after the band had left the record label; it consisted of the band's Decca hit singles combined with various unreleased recordings. The album rose to number 17 in the Record Retailer album chart in the UK.

== Album profile ==
The album was released by Don Arden on Decca after the group had made a switch to the Immediate label headed by Andrew Loog Oldham. The album contains their hit records on Decca including their number one song "All or Nothing". The album also includes a cover of Del Shannon's classic hit song "Runaway", and other previously unissued songs which were apparently demos. It features earlier versions of songs they re-recorded for Immediate, including "My Way of Giving", which they had demoed for Chris Farlowe, and "(Tell Me) Have You Ever Seen Me?", which they had given to Apostolic Intervention. The album also featured their stage favourite "Baby Don't You Do It", featuring Jimmy Winston on lead vocals and guitar. The group's manager Don Arden sings the 'operatic prologue' to their cover of "Runaway".

== Track listing ==
All tracks written by Steve Marriott and Ronnie Lane, unless otherwise noted.

Side one
No.	Title	Writer(s)	Lead vocals	Length
1.	"Runaway" (+)	Max Crook; Del Shannon	Steve Marriott	2:47
2.	"My Mind's Eye"		Marriott	2:02
3.	"Yesterday, Today and Tomorrow" (+)		Ronnie Lane	1:52
4.	"That Man" (+)		Lane	2:14
5.	"My Way of Giving" (+)		Marriott	1:58
6.	"Hey Girl"		Marriott	2:16
7.	"(Tell Me) Have You Ever Seen Me?" (+)		Marriott	2:17
Total length:				15:26

Side two
No.	Title	Writer(s)	Lead vocals	Length
8.	"Come Back and Take This Hurt Off Me" (+)	Don Covay; Ron Miller	Marriott	2:16
9.	"All or Nothing"		Marriott	3:02
10.	"Baby Don't You Do It" (+)	Holland-Dozier-Holland	Jimmy Winston	2:00
11.	"Plum Nellie" (+)	Steve Cropper; Al Jackson Jr.; Booker T. Jones; Lewie Steinberg	Instrumental	2:30
12.	"Sha-La-La-La-Lee"	Kenny Lynch; Mort Shuman	Marriott	2:54
13.	"You've Really Got a Hold on Me" (+)	William "Smokey" Robinson Jr.	Marriott	3:16
14.	"Whatcha Gonna Do About It"	Brian Potter; Ian Samwell	Marriott	1:57
Total length:				17:55

(+ indicates that it was previously unissued)

== Personnel ==
- Steve Marriott – lead guitar (all tracks), lead (1–2, 5–9, 11–14) and backing vocals
- Ronnie Lane – bass, backing and lead (3, 4) vocals
- Kenney Jones – drums, percussion
- Ian McLagan – keyboards/backing vocals (1–9, 11–13)
- Jimmy Winston – keyboards/backing vocals (14), lead vocals/rhythm guitar (10)

== Charts ==
Weekly chart performance for From the Beginning
Chart (1967)	Peak position
UK Disc and Music Echo Top Ten LPs	8
UK Record Retailer LPs Chart	17

== Additional releases ==
- 1967 Format LP Label/Deram – Catalog # 4633
- 1967 Format LP Label/Decca – Catalog # 4879
- 1990 Format CD Label/Polygram – Catalog # 820766
- 1997 Format CD Label/Deram – Catalog # 844633
- 1997 Format CD Label/PolyGram – Catalog # 820766
- 1997 Format CD Label/London Records – Catalog #820 766
- 1997 Format CD Label/Polygram Intl. – Catalog # 844633
- 2006 Format CD Label/Universal/Polygram – Catalog #9069
- 2012 Format 2 CD Deluxe Edition Label/Universal/Sanctuary Records

== See also ==
- Small Faces discography
