= My Way of Giving =

Song written by Steve Marriott and Ronnie Lane

- West German picture sleeve

Single by Chris Farlowe
- B-side: "You're So Good For Me"
- Released: 27 January 1967
- Recorded: 1 January 1967
- Genre: Pop; baroque pop
- Length: 2:17
- Label: Immediate
- Songwriters: Steve Marriott; Ronnie Lane
- Producer: Mick Jagger

Chris Farlowe singles chronology
"Ride On, Baby" (1966)	"My Way of Giving" (1967)	"Yesterday's Papers" (1967)

"My Way of Giving" is a song written by Steve Marriott and Ronnie Lane. Initially demoed by their band Small Faces in 1966, it was given to British singer Chris Farlowe, who released his version as a single in early 1967. It was Farlowe's first single not written by Jagger–Richards since 1965's "The Fool". The Small Faces themselves decided to go on and record a version which was released on two different albums (albeit with minor differences) on two different record labels.

The song has since been recorded by multiple other artists, including French rock singer Johnny Hallyday in French as "Je n’ai jamais rien demandé" for his 1967 studio album Johnny 67. The Only Ones recorded a demo in 1975 that was released on their 1984 album Remains. Rock artist Rod Stewart would also go on to cover the track in 1970. Drummer Kenney Jones and keyboardist Ian McLagan appear on Small Faces and Stewart's rendition. Marriott plays on Farlowe's and Small Faces version while Lane appears on Farlowe's, Small Faces and Stewart's versions, becoming the only member of Small Faces to do so.

== Chris Farlowe version ==
=== Overview ===
In 1966, Chris Farlowe had achieved a number one single on the UK Singles Chart with the Rolling Stones song "Out of Time". During this period, he only recorded songs that the Rolling Stones had offered him, starting with "Think" Of the eleven singles he recorded for Immediate Records, five were Rolling Stones songs. Towards the end of 1966, he'd met rock band Small Faces, who were signed to Decca Records at the time. Steve Marriott, lead singer and guitarist of the group, admired Farlowe, and considered him one of the finest British singers of the era. Marriott had even considered recording an entire album together with him. However, these plans were scrapped, and the Small Faces gave him a song they'd previously recorded as a demo, "My Way Of Giving."

In a BBC interview, Farlowe claims that Marriott had approached him and asked him to listen to the recording. Farlowe considered it nice and brought it to Mick Jagger, who also voiced his enthusiasm about the track and they decided to record it as a single. The session for it occurred in early 1967, which features both Marriott and Ronnie Lane on guitars and backing vocals, along with Farlowe's backing band the Thunderbirds. Farlowe's version was released on 27 January 1967. The single did not breach the top forty, peaking at number 48. It was one of his final singles to reach the UK singles chart. The last two being "Moanin'", which reached number 46. Chris Farlowe's last song to chart was ultimately "Handbags and Gladrags" which reached number 33.

The B-Side was "You're So Good For Me" (alternatively known as "You're So Good To Me") which was written by Immediate Records founder Andrew Loog Oldham, Andrew Rose and David Skinner (both of British group Twice as Much) and William Bell.

=== Personnel ===
- Chris Farlowe – lead vocals
- Steve Marriott – guitars, backing vocals
- Ronnie Lane – backing vocals
- the Thunderbirds – backing instrumentation, backing vocals
- Mick Jagger – producer
- Art Greenslade – arranger

== Small Faces version ==
"My Way of Giving"

Song by Small Faces

from the album From the Beginning
- Released: 2 June 1967
- Recorded: October 1966
- Studio: IBC, London
- Genre: Power pop; psychedelic pop; R&B
- Length: 1:58
- Label: Decca
- Songwriters: Marriott; Lane
- Producer: Don Arden

"My Way of Giving"

Song by Small Faces

from the album Small Faces
- Released: 23 June 1967
- Recorded: October 1966 – 4 April 1967
- Studio: IBC and Olympic, London
- Genre: Power pop; psychedelic pop; R&B
- Length: 1:59
- Label: Immediate
- Songwriters: Marriott; Lane
- Producers: Marriott; Lane

=== Overview ===
During late 1966, Small Faces had begun experimenting with their sound, and started recording several psychedelic compositions, including "(Tell Me) Have You Ever Seen Me?" "Yesterday, Today and Tomorrow", "My Mind's Eye" and "That Man", after a party in which they were introduced to orange slices spiked with LSD. However, an additional track they started writing around this period was "My Way of Giving". They were signed with Decca Records during this period, with Don Arden as their manager and producer. However, their relation with the label had begun growing sour, after several incidents, including the unauthorized release of "My Mind's Eye" as a single in late 1966. They split up with Decca after Don Arden attempted to tell their parents regarding their drug use. Almost immediately after, Small Faces signed Immediate Records, who granted them much more studio time.

Two versions of the song exist. One of them was released on the Decca compilation album From the Beginning during the earlier parts of June 1967. The second, "official" version was released on their eponymous second studio album Small Faces on 23 June 1967. The reason behind this is that when Small Faces was announced, Decca Records and Don Arden compiled an album of various leftovers that the Small Faces recorded for Decca, which included "My Way Of Giving." The main difference is that the Decca recording has an alternate vocal take, both by Marriott and Lane, who in that version adds the line "Don't Worry Baby" in between a couple of verses (which is also included on the Farlowe version). This is omitted from the Immediate version. While the Decca version exists solely in mono, the Immediate version was released in both mono and stereo, with the instrumental backing panned to the left, with a guitar overdub and vocals appearing in the right channel. Both versions utilize the same backing track.

"My Way of Giving" was one of two songs that appears on both From the Beginning and Small Faces. The other is "(Tell Me) Have You Ever Seen Me?" which did not use the same backing track on the Immediate version. In the US, the song was first issued on 17 March 1968, on There Are But Four Small Faces which compiled various singles along with tracks from Small Faces. The song is considered a major factor in the writing partnership between Marriott and Lane. It is also considered one of Small Faces best compositions of all times. Strangely, it is not featured on Here Come The Nice: Immediate Years box set 1967-69 which compiled all recordings from the Immediate era.

"My Way of Giving" was issued as the B-Side of the re-issue of "Itchycoo Park" on 28 November 1975, which reached number nine in the UK charts.

=== Personnel ===
- Steve Marriott – lead vocals, backing vocals, acoustic guitar, electric guitar
- Ronnie Lane – backing vocals, bass guitar
- Ian McLagan – backing vocals, Hammond organ, piano
- Kenney Jones – drums

== Rod Stewart version ==
"My Way of Giving"

Song by Rod Stewart

from the album Gasoline Alley
- Released: 12 June 1970
- Recorded: February – April 1970
- Studio: Morgan Studios, London
- Genre: Blue-eyed soul; rock and roll
- Length: 3:55
- Label: Mercury; Vertigo
- Songwriters: Marriott; Ronnie Lane
- Producers: Stewart; Lou Reizner

=== Overview ===
In 1970, British rock singer Rod Stewart recorded the song for his studio album Gasoline Alley. Stewart, who at the time was a member of Faces, the successor of Small Faces, had been critical of the original Small Faces recording. He had called it "monstrous" in a ZigZag interview. This was most likely due to the fact that Marriott had recently left Small Faces, and been replaced by Stewart and Ronnie Wood, formerly of the Jeff Beck Group.

In comparison to the Small Faces version (which is relatively short, clocking in at a mere two minutes), Stewart's rendition of the track is a long, drawn out ballad heavily featuring Ian McLagan on his signature Hammond organ. It features members of the Faces, providing backing instrumentals, along with Lane, who also provides backing vocals to the track. In a positive retrospective review by AllMusic critic Stephen Thomas Erlewine, he claims that Stewart claims the track for himself.

=== Personnel ===
- Rod Stewart – lead vocals
- Ronnie Lane – bass guitar, backing vocals
- Ronnie Wood – lead guitar
- Ian McLagan – Hammond organ
- Kenney Jones – drums
