= Up the Wooden Hills to Bedfordshire =

Song written by Ian McLagan

Song by Small Faces

from the album Small Faces
- Released: 23 June 1967
- Recorded: March 1967
- Studio: Olympic, London
- Genre: Pop rock
- Length: 2:05
- Label: Immediate
- Songwriter: Ian McLagan
- Producers: Steve Marriott; Ronnie Lane

"Up the Wooden Hills to Bedfordshire" (alternatively known as "Up the Wooden Hills") is a song written by English keyboardist Ian McLagan, first recorded and released by his band Small Faces in 1967. The song was McLagan's first original composition written for the band.

== Background ==
Ian McLagan joined the Small Faces in October 1965 as a keyboardist, and performed his first gig with them on 2 November that year at the Lyceum Theatre, in London. McLagan acted as a keyboardist, preferring to play the Hammond organ over other organs, but also occasionally played rhythm guitar, an instrument he played in a previous band. However, McLagan had not significantly contributed a song to the band, who either played covers or songs written by Steve Marriott and Ronnie Lane. He had however, received a shared songwriting credits for several instrumentals of the band, including "Own Up Time" from their debut album, "Grow Your Own", the B-Side of "Sha-La-La-La-Lee" and "Almost Grown", the B-side of "Hey Girl".

By early 1967, the band had had experiences with psychedelic drugs, and started coming up with new songs. The song was largely inspired by Ronnie Lane's father Stan Lane, who used to have specific word plays. In a later interview, Stan stated that upon putting Ronnie into bed, he would say "Come on, let's go up the wooden hills to Bedfordshire". As Stan was a lorry driver, he would occasionally go to Bedfordshire to pick up bricks, often bringing Ronnie there. Later, during an interview with Ken Sharp, McLagan would ask "Do you know what that means? Up the stairs to bed. Wooden hills. It was an expression that Ronnie Lane's father used to use when he was about to go to bed "....well, it's up the wooden hills to Bedfordshire...." I thought it was a lovely line. It's a drug song I suppose. I used to be stoned all the time -- you know, when you "sleep"—trying to explain how you felt. "When you're slipping into sleep..." isn't falling asleep, it's gettin' stoned."

== Release and reception ==
The song was recorded at Olympic Studios during the early months of 1967, with Glyn Johns along with Eddie Kramer engineering. The song was mixed within the following months. "Up the Wooden Hills to Bedfordshire" was first released on 23 June 1967, when it was featured on the second side of Small Faces, the group's second studio album. The song was first issued in the US on 17 March 1968, when it was featured on the first side of the North American release There Are But Four Small Faces. For this release, the song was promptly renamed to simply "Up the Wooden Hills", removing the "to Bedfordshire" suffix. The reason behind this is currently unclear, however, it is believed to be due to the fact that the region of Bedfordshire is virtually unknown to most Americans. An alternate mix of the song was created for radio stations, used to advertise There Are But Four Small Faces. An alternate mix was used on the Here Comes The Nice: Immediate Years box set 1967-69.

Often called an overdue songwriting debut by McLagan, the song received mostly positive reviews. In 1968, Billboard magazine called it one of the best recordings by the group. In a retrospective review, Roland Schmitt writes that the song's harmonic layout bears a similarity to contemporary rock group Procol Harum due to the layers of acoustic guitars and keyboards which layer the track. Upon hearing the composition for the first time, Small Faces drummer Kenney Jones knew that McLagan had succeeded in writing a good song. Coincidentally, the song has a similar title to a Vera Lynn song: in 1936, she recorded and released a composition called "Up the Wooden Hill to Bedfordshire", which was written by Nixon Grey and Reginald Connelly. This track was Lynn's first solo single, and it was released on the Crown Records label.

== Personnel ==
Personnel according to Here Comes The Nice: Immediate Years box set 1967-69.

- Ian McLagan – lead vocals, piano, hammond organ, mellotron, rhythm guitar
- Steve Marriott – acoustic and electric guitars, backing vocals
- Ronnie Lane – bass guitar, backing vocals
- Kenney Jones – drums, percussion
