= Get Yourself Together (disambiguation) =

"Get Yourself Together" is a song by British rock group Small Faces.

Get Yourself Together may also refer to:

- "Get Yourself Together", a song by Christina Gimmie from her 2013 album With Love
- "Get Yourself Together", a song by The Black Keys from their 2018 album Let's Rock
- "Get Yourself Together", a song by Daniel Johnston from his 1983 album Hi, How Are You
