= To Strangers and Friends =

Studio album by John Pantry
- Released: 1980
- Genre: Folk/Rock/Gospel
- Label: Kingsway KMR323
- Producer: John Pantry; Nick Ryan

John Pantry chronology
Nothing is Impossible (1979)	To Strangers and Friends (1980)	Hot Coals (1981)

To Strangers and Friends is the title of the fifth solo album by the British singer-songwriter John Pantry.

== Track listing ==
=== Side one ===
1. "Don't be Careless" (John Pantry)
2. "Don't Touch" (John Pantry)
3. "I Want to be Like You" (John Pantry)
4. "Runours" (John Pantry)
5. "Loneliness" (John Pantry)

=== Side two ===
1. "A Change of Heart" (John Pantry)
2. "Blame it on the One I Love" (Kelly Willard)
3. "Going Over Old Ground" (John Pantry)
4. "I Belong to You" (John Pantry)
5. "Awake" (John Pantry)

== Personnel ==
- John Pantry: Vocals and Keyboards
- Tim Harries: Bass
- Phil Gould: Drums
- Chris Norton: Keyboards
- Victor Lewis Smith: Keyboards and Saxophone
- Norman Barratt: Guitar
- John McLoughlin: Guitar
- Mo Witham: Guitar
- Rob McKay: Saxophone
- Bruce Nockles: Trumpet
- Andrew MAries: Oboe
- London Festival Ballet: Strings

== Production notes ==
- Produced by John Pantry and Nick Ryan
- Mastered by Dave Aston
- Arranged by Chris Norton
- Recorded at ICC Studios, Eastbourne, East Sussex
