= All or Nothing (Small Faces song) =

1966 single by the British band Small Faces

"All Or Nothing"
- West German picture sleeve

Single by Small Faces
- B-side: "Understanding"
- Released: 5 August 1966
- Recorded: 25 July 1966
- Studio: IBC, London
- Genre: Rock; R&B; psychedelic pop
- Length: 3:04
- Label: Decca (US RCA Victor)
- Songwriters: Steve Marriott, Ronnie Lane
- Producer: Don Arden

Small Faces singles chronology
"Hey Girl" (1966)	"All Or Nothing" (1966)	"My Mind's Eye" (1966)

"All or Nothing"

Song by Small Faces

from the album The Autumn Stone
- Released: 14 November 1969
- Recorded: 18 November 1968
- Venue: Newcastle City Hall, Newcastle upon Tyne
- Genre: Hard rock; psychedelic rock
- Length: 3:41
- Label: Immediate
- Songwriters: Marriott; Lane
- Producers: Glyn Johns; Marriott; Lane

"All or Nothing" is a song by the English rock band Small Faces. Written by Steve Marriott and Ronnie Lane, it was released as a single in August 1966 and reached number one on the UK Singles Chart for one week.

== Song information ==
According to Kay Marriott, Steve's mother, Steve wrote this song about his split with ex-fiancée Sue Oliver, though first wife Jenny Rylance states that Marriott told her he wrote the song for her as a result of her split with Rod Stewart. Both statements are said to be correct.

The song was recorded at IBC Studios in Portland Place, London. It appears on the Decca album From the Beginning. A live version is found on the BBC Sessions album.

Following Marriott's death in a house fire in 1991, the song was played as the requiem at his funeral.

== In popular culture ==
The song appeared in the soundtrack for the 2010 film Made in Dagenham, Nigel Cole's film about the 1968 Ford sewing machinists strike at Ford Dagenham, where female workers protested against sexual discrimination and for equal pay.

The song played over the end credits of the "1966" episode of Our Friends in the North.

The song is used as the theme tune (over the opening credits) on the 2012 BBC UK TV series, The Syndicate, about a group of lottery winners. Swedish pop band Tages did one of the earliest versions of the B-Side "Understanding", which appears on their 1966 album Extra Extra. The hard rock band UFO covered the song as a bonus track on their album No Heavy Petting. The punk rock band X also covered the song on their 1985 album Ain't Love Grand!.

== Personnel ==
- Steve Marriott – lead and backing vocals, electric guitar
- Ronnie Lane – bass guitar, backing vocals
- Ian McLagan – Hammond organ, backing vocals
- Kenney Jones – drums

== Charts ==
Weekly chart performance for "All or Nothing"
Chart (1966)	Peak position
Denmark (DR Top 20)	17
Ireland (RTÉ)	3
Malaysia (Radio Malaysia)	6
Netherlands (Dutch Top 40)	2
Netherlands (Single Top 100)	2
New Zealand (Listener)	15
Norway (VG-lista)	10
Sweden (Kvällstoppen)	15
Sweden (Tio i Topp)	5
UK (Disc and Music Echo)	1
UK (Melody Maker)	1
UK (New Musical Express)	1
UK (Record Retailer)	1
West Germany (Media Control)	17

== See also ==
- Small Faces discography
