= Steve Marriott: All Too Beautiful... =

- Author: Paolo Hewitt; John Hellier
- Genre: Biography
- Publisher: Helter Skelter Publishing
- Publication date: 2004; 2005 (re-issue)
- Media type: Print (hardback, paperback)
- Pages: 352
- ISBN: 1-900924-44-7
- OCLC: 56452717

Steve Marriott: All Too Beautiful is the official biography of English musician Steve Marriott, who co-founded and played in the rock bands Small Faces (1965–1969) and Humble Pie (1969–1975). The book was written by Paolo Hewitt, a former NME journalist and music critic, and John Hellier, a Steve Marriott fan and webmaster of The Darlings of Wapping Wharf Laundrette website.

The hardback edition was first published in the UK by Helter Skelter in 2004 and has since been available in a paperback edition .

== Overview ==
All Too Beautiful is a biography that provides in-depth detail and analysis on all aspects of Steve Marriott's life, both professional and personal. From his family's working-class background, the circumstances surrounding his premature birth in East Ham Hospital, East London on 30 January 1947, the biography documents the many twists and turns of his life until his death on 20 April 1991.

The hardback edition contains published black and white photographs, many of which come from his family's private collection, including Marriott seen as a baby, toddler, teenager, and also during his time in Small Faces and Humble Pie. There are also images of his childhood homes in Strone Road and Daines Close, the hospital where he was born, his school report from Monega Junior School in Manor Park, and his family, his children, wives, and bands.

The back of the book also catalogs all the known song releases and re-releases ever recorded by Marriott, including guest appearances and collaborations.

== Reception ==
Gary Crowley of BBC London reviewed the biography, which they felt "captures him perfectly. A right riveting read as they say." Jah Wobble reviewed the book for The Independent, calling it "nothing if not a labour of love." Pete Clark of the Evening Standard called the book "ably constructed" while also stating that the authors are "unable to dispel the sense that this baby-faced man with an evil tongue was a bit of a sod."

Steven Macbri of The Independent criticized the work for containing some mistakes and inaccuracies, and for taking some of Marriott's own jokes about his life as fact.

== See also ==
- The Moments
- Small Faces
- Small Faces discography
- Humble Pie
- Steve Marriott
- Steve Marriott discography
