= Small Faces (1966 album) =

Studio album by Small Faces
- Released: 6 May 1966
- Recorded: June 1965 – February 1966
- Studios: Decca & IBC, London
- Genres: R&B; soul; garage rock
- Length: 32:47
- Label: Decca
- Producers: Small Faces; Ian Samwell

Small Faces chronology
Small Faces (1966)	From the Beginning (1967)

Singles from Small Faces
- 1. "Whatcha Gonna Do About It" Released: 6 August 1965; 2. "Sha-La-La-La-Lee" Released: 28 January 1966

Small Faces is the debut album of British rock group Small Faces, released in May 1966 by Decca Records. It includes the hit singles "Whatcha Gonna Do About It" and "Sha-La-La-La-Lee". The album was well received by music critics and was popular with the public, rising to number 3 on the UK albums chart and remaining at the top for several weeks. It reached number 8 in Finland.

== Background ==
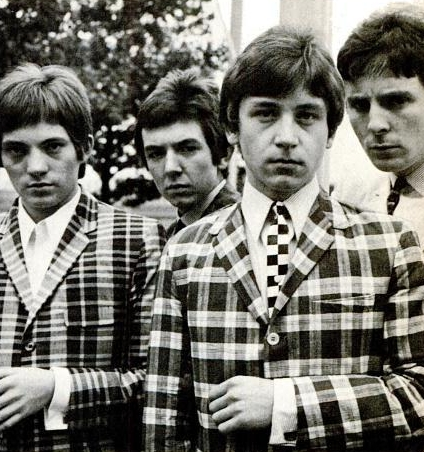
Small Faces, 1965. Original keyboardist Jimmy Winston (far right) is featured on roughly half the tracks on the album.

On 6 August 1965, Small Faces released their debut single "Whatcha Gonna Do About It" on Decca Records. After the band's second single, "I've Got Mine", released on 5 November 1965, failed to chart, Jimmy Winston was asked to leave the band. He still appears on many tracks on this album, including writing contributions to "It's Too Late" and providing keyboards and vocals on various tracks. Winston's replacement Ian McLagan appears on the album cover and plays on various tracks as well.

== Content ==
Professional ratings
Review scores
Source	Rating
AllMusic	4.5/5 stars
Classic Rock	8/10 stars

The album was recorded at IBC Studios, Portland Place, London, between June 1965 and February 1966. Glyn Johns was the studio engineer. In 1966, Small Faces became the eleventh biggest selling artists of the year.

In 1962, Muddy Waters recorded "You Need Love", written for him by peer Willie Dixon. "You Need Loving" is a veiled cover of "You Need Love". Small Faces were never sued by Dixon, even though "You Need Loving" only credits Ronnie Lane and Steve Marriott as writers. Guitarist Jimmy Page (initially of The Yardbirds and later of Led Zeppelin fame) has claimed to have been disappointed when, after coming up with a wicked guitar riff and requesting Robert Plant pen some lyrics, the singer returned with those of "You Need Loving", a tune Plant, a big Small Faces fan, had, according to Small Faces singer Steve Marriott in early '70s Canadian rock newspaper Beetle, said he had longed to record. Thus, "You Need Loving" became the basis for lyrics of Led Zeppelin's hit song "Whole Lotta Love" in 1969.

Three of the tracks had been released prior to the album. These are the two singles, "Whatcha Gonna Do About It" and "Sha-La-La-La-Lee", along with the track "It's Too Late", which was issued as the B-side of "I've Got Mine", the group's second single, released in 1965. The band's fourth single, "Hey Girl", was released around the same time as the album; ultimately it was not included and can instead be found on their 1967 compilation album From the Beginning.

== Track listing ==
Side one
No.	Title	Writer(s)	Length
1.	"Shake"	Sam Cooke	2:55
2.	"Come on Children"	Kenney Jones; Ronnie Lane; Steve Marriott; Jimmy Winston	4:20
3.	"You Better Believe It"	Kenny Lynch; Jerry Ragovoy	2:19
4.	"It's Too Late"	Jones; Lane; Marriott; Winston	2:37
5.	"One Night Stand"	Lane; Marriott	1:50
6.	"Whatcha Gonna Do About It"	Ian Samwell; Brian Potter	1:59

Side two
No.	Title	Writer(s)	Length
7.	"Sorry She's Mine"	Lynch	2:48
8.	"Own Up Time"	Jones; Lane; Marriott; Ian McLagan; (Note: The sleeve of the original LP release credits the song as simply "Own Up".)	1:47
9.	"You Need Loving"	Willie Dixon (Note: "You Need Loving" was an adaptation of "You Need Love", written by Willie Dixon and recorded by Muddy Waters. However, the original pressing of the LP credits Steve Marriott and Ronnie Lane as composers.)	3:59
10.	"Don't Stop What You're Doing"	Jones; Lane; Marriott; Winston	1:55
11.	"E Too D"	Lane; Marriott	3:02
12.	"Sha-La-La-La-Lee"	Lynch; Mort Shuman	2:56

== Personnel ==
Personnel according to the 2012 deluxe edition of Small Faces.

Small Faces

- Steve Marriott – lead vocals (2–7, 9–12) lead guitar, guitars, backing vocals
- Ronnie Lane – lead vocals ("Shake"), bass guitar, backing vocals
- Kenney Jones – drums, percussion
- Ian McLagan – organ, piano, backing vocals (1, 3, 5, 7–9, 12)
- Jimmy Winston – organ, guitar, backing vocals (2, 4, 6, 10–11)

Other personnel

- Kenny Lynch – backing vocals ("Sha-La-La-La-Lee")
- Ian Samwell – producer ("Whatcha Gonna Do About It")
- Small Faces – producer
- Glyn Johns – engineer
- John Pantry – engineer

== Charts ==
Weekly chart performance for Small Faces
Chart (1966)	Peak position
Finnish Soumen virallinen Albums	8
UK Record Retailer LPs Chart	3
UK Disc and Music Echo Top Ten LPs	3
UK Melody Maker Top Ten LPs	3
UK New Musical Express Best Selling LPs in Britain	3
