= Tin Soldier (song) =

- UK picture sleeve

Single by Small Faces
- B-side: "I Feel Much Better"
- Released: 2 December 1967
- Recorded: 5–13 October 1967
- Studio: Olympic, London
- Genre: Power pop; R&B
- Length: 3:19
- Label: Immediate
- Songwriters: Steve Marriott; Ronnie Lane
- Producers: Steve Marriott; Ronnie Lane

Small Faces singles chronology
"Itchycoo Park" (1967)	"Tin Soldier" (1967)	"Lazy Sunday" (1968)

Music video
- Small Faces with P. P. Arnold - "Tin Soldier" (1968) on YouTube

"Tin Soldier" is a song released by the English rock band Small Faces on 2 December 1967, written by Steve Marriott (credited to Marriott/Lane). The song peaked at number nine in the UK singles chart and number 38 in Canada. It has since been covered by many other notable rock artists.

== Song profile ==
Tin Soldier was originally written by Steve Marriott for singer P. P. Arnold, but Marriott liked it so much he kept it himself. It was a song that he wrote to his first wife, Jenny Rylance. P. P. Arnold can be heard singing backing vocals on the song and also performed as guest singer at television recordings of the song. The song signalled a return to the band's R&B roots whilst continuing their forays into psychedelic rock and other musical experiments. When Tin Soldier was released the BBC informed the band that the last line of the song had to be removed from all TV and radio broadcasts, mistakenly believing that Marriott sang "sleep with you", when in fact the lyric is "sit with you". Marriott explained that the song was about "getting into someone's mind—not their body". Tin Soldier reached number nine in the UK Singles Chart and remains one of Small Faces' best known songs.

Talking about the song, and the influence of his wife Jenny, Marriott stated:

The meaning of the song is about getting into somebody's mind—not their body. It refers to a girl I used to talk to all the time and she really gave me a buzz. The single was to give her a buzz in return and maybe other people as well. I dig it. There's no great message really and no physical scenes.

The song seems to have been influenced by Hans Christian Andersen's fairy tale The Steadfast Tin Soldier, the story of an imperfect tin soldier's desire for a paper ballerina. The opening lyric is "I am a little tin soldier that wants to jump into your fire".

Upon reaching No. 73 in the U.S. with this single, their label Immediate Records abandoned its attempts to penetrate the American market. "Tin Soldier" would ultimately be the last song performed live by the Small Faces during their original incarnation; It was performed on 8 March 1969 at Springfield Ballroom (now demolished and replaced by the football stand of Springfield Stadium) in Jersey.

=== Mojo readers' poll ===
In 1997, some 30 years after the song's original release, Mojo voted "Tin Soldier" the tenth-best single of all time, in a readers' poll. The poll placed it ahead of anything by The Who or The Rolling Stones. The song has also been much mentioned over the years by Paul Weller and featured in Noel Gallagher's personal all-time top ten song list.

== Personnel ==
- Steve Marriott – lead and backing vocals, acoustic and electric guitars
- Ronnie Lane – bass guitar, backing vocals
- Ian McLagan – acoustic and electric pianos, Hammond organ, backing vocals
- Kenney Jones – drums

Additional personnel

- P. P. Arnold – backing vocals

== Charts ==
=== Weekly charts ===
Chart (1967–68)	Peak position
Australia (Kent Music Report)	3
Belgium (Ultratop 50 Wallonia)	38
Canada (RPM)	38
Netherlands (Single Top 100)	4
New Zealand (Listener)	3
Sweden (Kvällstoppen)	16
Sweden (Tio i Topp)	7
Switzerland (Schweizer Hitparade)	7
UK Singles (Official Charts Company)	9
US Billboard Hot 100	73
US Cashbox 100	73
West German Media Control Singles Chart	7

=== All-time charts ===
Chart	Rank
Netherlands (Single Top 100)	4669

== Covers ==
The song has been covered by Quiet Riot, Lou Gramm, Uriah Heep, Streetheart, Todd Rundgren, The Guess Who, Paul Weller, Transatlantic, and Humble Pie (which also featured Marriott).

In 1998 the Argentine musician Charly Garcia recorded a version, in Spanish, on his album El aguante, titled "Soldado de lata".

In October 2007 Tim Rogers, of You Am I, and Talei Wolfgramm performed the track on Australian music quiz show RocKwiz.

Scorpions made a cover of the song for their 2011 album Comeblack.

Progressive rock band Transatlantic covered this song on their 2014 album Kaleidoscope, on disc 2 of the special edition.

P. P. Arnold has performed the song live.

== See also ==
- Small Faces discography
