= John Pantry =

British singer

- Born: October 10, 1946 (age 79)
- Origin: Harrow, Middlesex, England
- Genre: Christian
- Website: www.johnpantry.com

John Pantry (born 10 October 1946) is a musician, singer, songwriter, audio engineer (at IBC Studios, for the Small Faces and on the first three Bee Gees L.P.s) and record producer from Harrow, Middlesex, England. He has been active since the late 1960s. Following his studio work in London he became a Christian through the influence of the many Christian artists for whom he produced albums, and toured internationally as a Christian singer and speaker.

Pantry was educated at Belfairs High School, Leigh on Sea, Essex. Whilst living in this area, he played keyboard for the local band, Sounds Around. Amongst the many gigs they performed was one on the rooftop of The Peterboat Inn, Leigh. The band also performed on the same bill as The Cops 'n' Robbers, who are known for their three-week stint on the 1960s rock programme, Ready Steady Go!.

Pantry released one solo disc in the early 1970s (which has not been reissued as of this date) before delving into the world of Christian music. Prior to that, he had been a studio engineer for IBC Studios (working with Eddie Tre-Vett), engineering for Southern Comfort, The Small Faces, The Bee Gees, Manfred Mann's Earth Band, Shindig, The New Seekers, Pentangle and Barry Ryan. He was also a member of Peter & The Wolves, an accomplished mid 1960s pop group from Leigh-on-Sea/Southend and had a major hand with many other IBC studio projects of the time: the Factory, Sounds Around, Wolfe, The Bunch and Norman Conquest.

In 2009, Wooden Hill released a double disc set of Pantry's late 1960s/early 1970s work. It includes singles/tracks from all the above groups plus numerous outtakes and demos. As well as a studio technician, Pantry was a songwriter, vocalist and an accomplished musician (he played the keyboards). The earlier tracks stem from one of Pantry's first groups, Sounds Around. They played straight pop with slight soul and psych influences - they released two singles in 1966-1967. Peter & The Wolves came shortly after Sounds Around's demise (they were essentially the same group). This is the group with which Pantry is most associated, along with The Factory. Peter & The Wolves released several singles and lasted into the early 1970s. This group's most productive period was probably the years of 1967-1969, where they released "Still", "Woman On My Mind", "Lantern Light," "Birthday," and "Little Girl Lost And Found".

It was around this time that John Pantry was asked to write two tracks for The Factory, a psychedelic group who had previously released "Path Through The Forest". Pantry wrote and sang lead on the two Factory songs, "Try A Little Sunshine" and "Red Chalk Hill". During this period, Pantry took advantage of free studio time and recorded a slew of demos. Most of the material spanning two discs appeared on a Wooden Hill anthology.

In 1990, he trained as an Anglican minister and he was ordained in 1993.

He hosts a programme on Premier Christian Radio called A Word In Season. He has recorded twelve albums of his songs, and a new album with the Adoramus Choir called God of the Empty Space was released on 19 June 2009, along with a songbook published by the Royal School of Church Music. According to his website, God of the Empty Space is a collection of seventeen new songs and choral pieces.

Pantry, the longest-serving national breakfast radio presenter in Britain, retired in 2020 from his Inspirational Breakfast show after 24 years behind the microphone.

== Discography ==
- John Pantry (1972)
- The Long White Trail (Soundtrack) (1973)
- Empty Handed (1977)
- Nothing is Impossible (1979)
- To Strangers and Friends (1980)
- Hot Coals (1981)
- It’s for You (1983)
- Discovery (1984)
- Simple Sailing for Beginners (1986)
- Breaking New Ground (1988)
- Raindance (1989)
- The Church Invincible (1992)
- Bitter Sweet (1994)
- God of the Empty Space (2009)
