= Itchycoo Park =

1967 single by Small Faces

- Dutch picture sleeve

Single by Small Faces
- B-side: "I'm Only Dreaming"
- Released: 4 August 1967
- Recorded: 3–7 July 1967
- Studio: Olympic (London)
- Genre: Psychedelic rock; psychedelic pop; experimental pop; music hall
- Length: 2:45
- Label: Immediate
- Songwriters: Steve Marriott; Ronnie Lane
- Producers: Steve Marriott; Ronnie Lane

Small Faces singles chronology
"Here Come the Nice" (1967)	"Itchycoo Park" (1967)	"Tin Soldier" (1967)

Audio sample
- file; help

"Itchycoo Park" is a song by the English rock band Small Faces, written by Steve Marriott, but mostly by Ronnie Lane. It was among a number of pop songs of the era to make use of flanging, an effect involving, at that time, electro-mechanical processes. The song was not included on any of their UK albums, but was however featured on the North American release There Are But Four Small Faces (1968).

Released on 4 August 1967 by Immediate Records, the song was Small Faces' fifth top-ten song in the UK Singles Chart, reaching a position of number three. "Itchycoo Park" became the Small Faces' sole top-forty hit in the United States, reaching number sixteen on the US Billboard Hot 100 in early 1968. In Continental Europe, it reached the top ten in several countries, while in Canada and New Zealand it was a number one hit. The single was re-released in December 1975, reaching number nine in the UK Singles chart, and is often attributed as the reason for the Small Faces reunion during the mid-1970s.

The song has since been covered by various other recording artists, most notably by English group M People in 1995, whose dance rendition of the song reached number eleven in the UK.

== Song profile ==
"Itchycoo Park" was released by Small Faces in August 1967. Together with "Lazy Sunday", "Tin Soldier" and "All or Nothing", the song is one of the band's biggest hits and has become a classic of its time.

The song reached number 16 in the US Billboard Hot 100 chart in 1968, during a chart run of 16 weeks. In Canada, the song reached number 1.

Long running British music magazine NME cites a readers poll voting "Itchycoo Park" number 62 out of the top 100 singles of all time.

"Itchycoo Park" climbed the charts again when it was re-released on 13 December 1975.

The song was one of the first pop singles to use flanging, an effect that can be heard in the bridge section after each chorus. Most sources credit the use of the effect to Olympic Studios engineer George Chkiantz who showed it to Small Faces' regular engineer Glyn Johns; he in turn demonstrated it to the group, who were always on the lookout for innovative production sounds, and they readily agreed to its use on the single.

Although many devices were soon created that could produce the same effect by purely electronic means, the effect as used on "Itchycoo Park" was at that time an electro-mechanical studio process. Two synchronised tape copies of a finished recording were played simultaneously into a third master recorder, and by manually retarding the rotation of one of the two tape reels by pressing on the flanges, a skilled engineer could subtly manipulate the phase difference between the two sources, creating the lush 'swooshing' phase effect that sweeps up and down the frequency range. The original single version was mixed and mastered in mono, and the phasing effect is more pronounced in the mono mix than in the later stereo mix.

== Inspiration ==
The song was first conceived of and largely written by Ronnie Lane, who had been reading a leaflet on the virtues of Oxford which mentioned its Bridge of Sighs and "dreaming spires", both referenced in the song's first stanza.

=== Possible etymologies ===
A suggested derivation for the name of the song is the nickname of Little Ilford Park, on Church Road in the London suburb of Manor Park, where Small Faces' singer and songwriter Steve Marriott grew up. The "itchycoo" nickname is in turn attributed to the stinging nettles which grew there. Other sources cite nearby Wanstead Flats (Manor Park end) as the inspiration for the song.

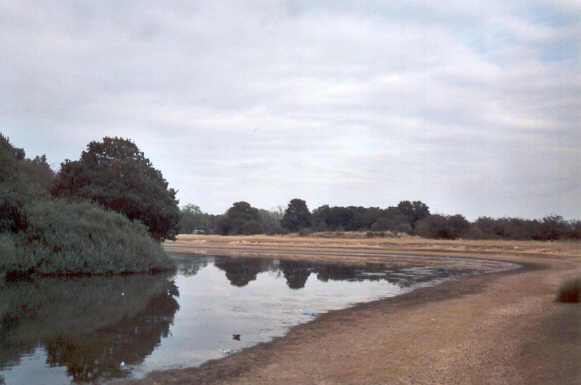
Photo of Wanstead Flats, London E12 near Marriott's Manor Park home

Marriott and Small Faces manager Tony Calder came up with the story when Marriott was told the BBC had banned the song for its overt drug references, Calder confirms:

We scammed the story together, we told the BBC that Itchycoo Park was a piece of waste ground in the East End that the band had played on as kids – we put the story out at ten and by lunchtime we were told the ban was off.

Ronnie Lane said of the true location of Itchycoo Park: "It's a place we used to go to in Ilford years ago. Some bloke we know suggested it to us because it's full of nettles and you keep scratching actually".

In an interview Steve Marriott stated that Itchycoo Park is Valentine's Park in Ilford. "We used to go there and get stung by wasps. It's what we used to call it." This was reiterated by actor Tony Robinson, a childhood friend of Marriott.

In his book A New Day Yesterday: UK Progressive Rock & the 70s (2020) Mike Barnes writes that the song "epitomised a peculiarly late-Sixties English way of looking through a metaphorical lens – be it drug induced or not – at the everyday and transforming it, via the imagination, into something transcendental, almost mystical, and as such it was one of the most potent songs of the psychedelic era, which, at most, lasted just a couple of years from 1966 to the beginning of 1968." Barnes says that, with the song, the Small Faces "began to veer into more period territory, while still making a brilliant experimental pop single. They epitomised the way that many British musicians at this time were moving away from their influences and pursuing more individual ideas. [...] This pop song, with its memorable tune and alluring soundworld – and a Top 10 hit for the group – re-imagined humdrum Britain as somewhere that really could be perceived as being all too beautiful."

There is an Itchycoo Park in Beckton, London E6. However that was named as a homage to the song.

== Personnel ==
According to the liner notes of the 2012 7" re-master:

=== Small Faces ===
- Steve Marriott – lead and backing vocals, guitar
- Ronnie Lane – backing vocals, bass
- Ian McLagan – backing vocals, organ, piano
- Kenney Jones – drums, percussion

== Charts ==
=== Weekly charts ===
Chart (1967–1968)	Peak position
Australia (Kent Music Report)	2
Belgium (Ultratop)	19
Canada Top Singles (RPM)	1
Finland (Suomen virallinen lista)	38
Netherlands (Single Top 100)	3
New Zealand (Listener)	1
Norway (VG-lista)	4
US Billboard Hot 100	16
US Cash Box Top 100	13
US Record World Top 100	12
UK Singles (OCC)	3
West Germany (Media Control)	17

Chart (1976)	Peak position
UK Singles (OCC)	9
Belgium (Ultratop)	21
Ireland (IRMA)	8

=== Year-end charts ===
Chart (1967)	Rank
UK Singles (OCC)	33

Chart (1968)	Rank
US Cash Box Top 100	77
Canada Top Singles (RPM)	59

== Certifications ==
Region	Certification	Certified units/sales
United Kingdom (BPI)	Silver	200,000^{‡}
^{‡} Sales+streaming figures based on certification alone.

== M People version ==
"Itchycoo Park"

Single by M People

from the album Bizarre Fruit II
- B-side: "Padlock"
- Released: 13 November 1995
- Genre: Dance; house; gospel
- Length: 3:34
- Label: Deconstruction
- Songwriters: Steve Marriott; Ronnie Lane
- Producer: M People

M People singles chronology
"Love Rendezvous" (1995)	"Itchycoo Park" (1995)	"Just for You" (1997)

Music video
- "Itchycoo Park" on YouTube

British band M People released a dance version of "Itchycoo Park" in November 1995 by Deconstruction Records as the second single from their reissued and expanded version of the 1994 Bizarre Fruit album, Bizarre Fruit II (1995). It was produced by the band, peaking at number eleven on the UK Singles Chart and was remixed by David Morales. The song also peaked at number 21 in New Zealand, number 24 in Iceland, number 27 in Australia, and number 22 on the Eurochart Hot 100. The accompanying music video for "Itchycoo Park" was directed by British photographer and director Maria Mochnacz.

=== Critical reception ===
Scottish Aberdeen Press and Journal described M People's cover version of "Itchycoo Park" as "refreshing". Jose F. Promis from AllMusic named it an "epic version". Larry Flick from Billboard magazine noted that front woman Heather Small "whips through" the cover version "with a smooth blend of streetwise edge and sophisticated flair." He added, "Her distinctive way with a lyric is the stuff of future legends." Michael Bonner from Melody Maker wrote, "Bubbly, inoffensive, radio-friendly." A reviewer from Music & Media found that "chart darlings M People have reworked this Small Faces classic with equal measures of dance beats, a Billy Joel/River Of Dreams piano sound and marvellous gospel undertones. Their innovative arrangements will take them high into the charts with this one."

Mark Beaumont from NME deemed it "a gospelised cover" and said that "as a statement of alternative allegiance", it is "far too knowing, calculated, and late to come across as anything but the cred-grasping toss it is." Gill Whyte from Smash Hits gave it a score of four out of five, writing, "Kind of like a gospel cola ad with bonza psychedelic doings and piano twinklings. And, of course, there's the inimitable M-ster dance vibe and the oops-I've-swallowed-an-orange vocals by Megaphone Woman Heather. A top picnic of which you are advised to partake." Another Smash Hits editor, Alex Needham, called it a "dodgy version" in her review of the Bizarre Fruit II album.

=== Track listing ===
- Cassette single – 74321 33073 4
1. "Itchycoo Park" (Radio Edit) – 3:52
2. "Itchycoo Park" (Morales Classic Club Mix) – 7:52
- CD single – 74321 33073 2
1. "Itchycoo Park" (Radio Edit) – 3:52
2. "Itchycoo Park" (M People Master Mix) – 6:42
3. "Itchycoo Park" (Morales Classic Club Mix) – 7:52
4. "Itchycoo Park" (Hed Boys Post-Op Mix) – 9:04
5. "Itchycoo Park" (Morales Beautiful Instrumental) – 6:22
- 12–inch single – 74321 33073 1
1. "Itchycoo Park" (M People Master Mix) – 6:42
2. "Itchycoo Park" (Hed Boys Post-Op Mix) – 9:04
3. "Itchycoo Park" (Morales Classic Club Mix) – 7:52
4. "Padlock" (Junior Vasquez Club Dub) – 6:59

=== Charts ===
Chart (1995)	Peak position
Australia (ARIA)	27
Europe (Eurochart Hot 100)	22
Europe (European Hit Radio)	19
Germany (GfK)	55
Iceland (Íslenski Listinn Topp 40)	24
Ireland (IRMA)	16
Israel (Israeli Singles Chart)	27
Netherlands (Dutch Top 40 Tipparade)	14
Netherlands (Single Top 100 Tipparade)	4
New Zealand (Recorded Music NZ)	21
Scottish Singles Sales (Official Charts)	11
UK Singles (OCC)	11
UK Dance (Official Charts)	7
UK Club Chart (Music Week)	15

== Uses and other notable versions ==
- 1984: covered by progressive rock band The Enid
- 1992: Rymes with Orange, on the album Peel
- 1993: Blue Murder cover on the album Nothin' But Trouble
- 1993: Heavy metal band Quiet Riot covered on the album Terrified. Quiet Riot had also previously recorded covers of Tin Soldier and Afterglow of Your Love.
- 1996: covered by Ben Lee for the I Shot Andy Warhol soundtrack
- 1996: Tasmin Archer covered the song as a bonus track to the Japanese edition of her album Bloom
- 1996: The song is featured in the soundtrack to the Australian film Mr. Reliable
- 1999: Itchycoo Park 1999 was a "Pre-Bonnaroo" like music festival in Manchester, Tennessee, the same place in which Bonnaroo is today. The festival was successful its first year but did not fulfill its plans to return in 2000.
- 1999: The song can be heard in the marijuana documentary Grass.
- 2006: The original version is heard in the opening scenes of the British film Severance starring Danny Dyer.
- 2009: Used in soundtrack for the movie The Men Who Stare at Goats starring George Clooney, Ewan McGregor and Jeff Bridges.
- New Zealand/Australian band Dragon covered the song on their album It's All Too Beautiful (2011).
- 2015: Covered by Nellie McKay on her album My Weekly Reader.
- 2015: Covered by Alice Cooper's Hollywood Vampires on their debut album.
- 2018: The song can be heard in the Season 2 finale of The Handmaid's Tale. Commander Lawrence plays the song at his home.
- 2024: Covered by Robyn Hitchcock on his album 1967: Vacations in the Past.
