= Lazy Sunday (Small Faces song) =

- European picture sleeve

Single by Small Faces

from the album Ogdens' Nut Gone Flake
- B-side: "Rollin' Over"
- Released: 5 April 1968
- Recorded: February–March 1968
- Studio: Olympic, London
- Genre: Pop; psychedelia; music hall
- Length: 3:06
- Label: EMI, Immediate
- Songwriters: Steve Marriott; Ronnie Lane
- Producers: Steve Marriott; Ronnie Lane

Small Faces singles chronology
"Tin Soldier" (1967)	"Lazy Sunday" (1968)	"The Universal" (1968)

"Lazy Sunday" is a song by the English band Small Faces, which reached number two on the UK Singles Chart, number one in the Netherlands, number five in Australia and number 42 in Canada. It was written by the Small Faces songwriting duo Steve Marriott and Ronnie Lane, and appeared on the band's 1968 concept album Ogdens' Nut Gone Flake. Against the band's wishes, it preceded the album as a single release.

== Background ==
"Lazy Sunday" mixes pop with a traditional cockney East End of London music-hall sound. The song was inspired by Marriott's feuds with his neighbours and is also noticeable for its distinct vocal changes. Marriott sings large parts of the song in a greatly exaggerated cockney accent, partly due to an argument he had with the Hollies, who said that Marriott had never sung in his own accent. In the final bridge and the last two choruses, he reverts to his usual transatlantic (singing) accent. John Lydon cited the Small Faces as one of his few influences as vocalist for the Sex Pistols, and evidence of Marriott's influence on him can be found in this song.

At 51 seconds, the vocal backing quotes the "Colonel Bogey March" by F. J. Ricketts and, at 1 minute 45 seconds, "(I Can't Get No) Satisfaction" by the Rolling Stones. At the end of the song the tune dissolves into birdsong and church bells.

According to Small Faces keyboardist Ian McLagan, Lane's "rooty dooty di" vocal lines were in imitation of a member of the Who's road crew; the two bands had recently toured Australia together.

== Release ==
"Lazy Sunday" appears as track six on the album Ogdens' Nut Gone Flake, and is the last track on Side A of the vinyl release. Despite its success, the single was released against the band's wishes, and this contributed to Marriott's departure.

The song was used in the 2009 British comedy film The Boat That Rocked.

== Music video ==
The low-budget promotional video for "Lazy Sunday" was filmed at various locations, including Kenney Jones's parents' home on Havering Street in Stepney, east London.

== Covers and inspiration ==
- The song was later covered by the Toy Dolls as on their 1995 album Orcastrated.
- The London-based indie rock/garage revival band The Libertines covered the song in 2003 as part of the soundtrack to British film Blackball. It is also available as part of the Blackball OST album.
- Leeds-based indie rock band Kaiser Chiefs covered the song on French radio in 2008.
- Hard rock band Thunder covered the song live, which was included on the 2009 remastered edition of their 1992 album Laughing on Judgement Day
- Jack Wild recorded a version of this song for his first studio album The Jack Wild Album.

== Personnel ==
Personnel according to the 2014 box set Here Come the Nice: The Immediate Years Box Set 1967–1969.

Small Faces

- Steve Marriott – lead vocals, acoustic guitar, comb and paper
- Ronnie Lane – bass guitar, comb and paper, vocals
- Kenney Jones – drums, percussion
- Ian McLagan – Wurlitzer electronic piano, Hammond organ, tubular bells, paper and comb, vocals

With

- Glyn Johns – Musique concrète, sound effects, audio engineer

== Chart performance ==
=== Weekly charts ===
Chart (1968)	Peak position
Austria (Disc Parade)	1
Australia (Go-Set)	4
Australia (Kent Music Report)	5
Belgium (Ultratop 50 Flanders)	6
Belgium (Ultratop 50 Wallonia)	34
Canada (RPM)	42
Denmark (DR Top 20)	5
France (SNEP)	83
Ireland (RTÉ)	5
Malaysia (Radio Malaysia)	7
Netherlands (Dutch Top 40)	1
Netherlands (Single Top 100)	1
New Zealand (Listener)	1
Norway (VG-lista)	7
Poland (Polish Pathfinders Station)	4
Singapore (Radio Singapore)	4
South Africa (Springbok Radio)	10
Switzerland (Schweizer Hitparade)	2
UK (Melody Maker)	2
UK (New Musical Express)	3
UK (Record Retailer)	2
US (Billboard Bubbling Under Hot 100)	114
US (Cash Box Looking Ahead)	119
US (Record World Singles Coming Up)	102
West Germany (Media Control)	2

=== Year-end charts ===
Chart (1968)	Peak position
Austria (Disc Parade)	2
Netherlands (Dutch Top 40)	16
UK (Record Retailer)	38
West Germany (Media Control)	16

== See also ==
- Small Faces discography
