= IBC Studios =

Recording studios in London, England

Coordinates: 51°31′12.53″N 0°8′43.7″W

The IBC Recording Studios were independent recording studios located at 35 Portland Place in London, England. In the 1960s and 1970s, the studios become internationally famous after being used by recording artists such as Status Quo, the Kinks, the Who, Bee Gees, Cream and others.

== History ==
In 1930, Leonard Plugge established the International Broadcasting Company (IBC) as a commercial rival to the BBC, with IBC's studios utilised for radio production work. In the years following World War II, IBC's work gradually shifted from radio production to music production and, in 1962, Plugge sold the studios to BBC conductor Eric Robinson and musician George Clouston. Bolstered by the success of clients such as the Who, IBC was regarded as one of the top recording studios in London in the late 1960s.

In July, 1978, IBC was bought by musician Chas Chandler, who renamed them Portland Recording Studios. The address was also home to George Peckham's cutting rooms (Porky Prime Cuts) and Radiotracks Studios, a company specialising in recording and producing radio commercials. The studios were later bought by Don Arden for use by his Jet Records label, and run by his son David Arden.

Today, the studios are occupied by Musion das Hologram Ltd, which uses the space to demonstrate its life-size hologram technology and to record footage for broadcast as holographic images. Madonna used the system to appear as her virtual self at the Grammy Awards.

== Legacy ==
IBC manufactured much of its own equipment under the direction of Denis King. The quadraphonic mixing desk designed in the early 1970s was still in use in the late 1980s by Radiotracks, although in a different building. The desk had been built to take advantage of the quadraphonic technology that had been pioneered for music, although this never became popular, and the desk was never used for that purpose in its music days. Instead the quadraphonic system on the desk was put to good use for mixing soundtracks for large events, including a celebration of 800 years of the Lord Mayors of London at the Guildhall. Although all the large mixing desks were dismantled, one smaller desk, a nine-into-three desk used for locations recording, still exists and is in private hands. The small, fully transistorised desk, built around 1958, was used to record "My Old Man's a Dustman" by Lonnie Donegan in 1960.

Many notable recording engineers worked at IBC, including Glyn Johns. Joe Meek, Denis Preston and later Adrian Kerridge left IBC to found Lansdowne Studios in 1958. Other engineers trained there included Keith Grant (Olympic Studios), James Lock (Decca Studios), Ray Prickett (Pye Studios), John Timperley (Chappell Studios), and Eric Tomlinson (Anvil Recorders). Additionally, the sound samples for the pioneering Mellotron keyboard were recorded at the studios in the early 1960s.

== Recording artists ==
Notable artists who have recorded at IBC Studios include the following:

- Robert Plant & The Band of Joy

Lonnie Donegan

- The Action
- Adam Faith
- The Beatles, in Around the Beatles
- Bee Gees
- Billy J Kramer
- Petula Clark
- The Yardbirds
- Chick Corea
- Cream
- David Bowie as Davie or Davy Jones
- Deep Purple
- Duane Eddy
- The Easybeats
- Elton John
- The Equals
- Golden Earring
- Harmony Grass
- Jimi Hendrix
- Jimmy Page
- The Kinks
- London
- Lori Balmer
- The Marbles
- P.P. Arnold
- Rare Bird
- The Rockin' Ramrods
- Rod Stewart
- The Rolling Stones
- Samantha Sang
- Slade
- The Small Faces
- Soft Machine
- Status Quo
- Tony Blackburn
- Thunderclap Newman
- The Who
- Tim Hardin
- Tin Tin
- The Peddlers
- Roy Phillips
- The Lancastrians
- Lesley Duncan
- Long John Baldry
- Andy Bown
- Piranha Brothers
