= Kennebec Bridge =

Kennebec Bridge may refer to these bridges crossing the Kennebec River:

- Memorial Bridge (Augusta, Maine)
- Maine Kennebec Bridge (Richmond-Dresden, Maine)
- Pearl Harbor Remembrance Bridge (Gardiner-Randolph, Maine)
- Calumet Bridge at Old Fort Western (Augusta, Maine)
- Sagadahoc Bridge (Bath-Woolwich, Maine)
