= Memoria (disambiguation) =

Memoria refers to one of five canons in classical rhetoric.

Memoria, or Memorias (Spanish), or Memórias (Portuguese) may also refer to:

== Books and texts ==
- "Memorias" (Concepción Lombardo), a manuscript written between 1835 and 1917
- Memoria Apostolorum, lost text of the New Testament apocrypha
- Memorias, Spanish-language memoir by Leonor López de Córdoba
- Memórias Póstumas de Brás Cubas, Portuguese-language novel by Machado de Assis

== Films ==
- Memoria (2015 film), based on James Franco's story "Palo Alto"
- Memoria (2021 film), a drama film by Apichatpong Weerasethakul

== Music ==
=== Albums ===
- Memoria, 2004, by Cuban singer Polo Montañez
- Memoria (album), 2004, by the Argentine band Erreway
- In Memoria: Medieval Songs of Remembrance, 2007, by The Clerks Group
- Memorias (Grupo Bryndis album), 2011

=== Songs ===
- "Memoria" (Erreway song), 2004, by Erreway from the album Memoria
- "Memoria" (GFriend song), 2018, by South Korean girl group GFriend
- "Memoria", 2011, by Japanese singer Eir Aoi
- "Memória", 2025, by Rosalía from Lux

== Other ==
- 1247 Memoria, asteroid
- The Dark Eye: Memoria, a 2013 video game by Daedalic Entertainment

== See also ==
- Memory (disambiguation)
- In Memoriam (disambiguation)
