= Memorial (disambiguation) =

A memorial is an object served as a memory of something.

Memorial may also refer to:

== Common uses ==
- Memorial service, a ceremony performed in remembrance of a dead person
- Online memorial, an Internet site set up to remember someone who has died
- War memorial, an edifice to commemorate those who died, or were injured, in war

== Places ==
- Memorial, Houston, Texas
- Memorial Bridge (disambiguation), various locations

== Arts, entertainment, and media ==
=== Music ===
- Memorial (Clifford Brown album), 1956
- Memorial (Distorted album), an album by the Israeli metal band Distorted, or the title track
- Memorial (Moonspell album), a 2006 album by the Portuguese metal band Moonspell
- Memorial (Russian Circles album), 2013, or the title track
- Memorial (composition), a composition by Michael Nyman
- Memorial Album (Hank Williams album)

=== Television ===
- "Memorial" (Star Trek: Voyager) an episode of the television series Star Trek: Voyager
- "Memorial" (The Vampire Diaries), an episode of the television series The Vampire Diaries
- Memorials (TV series), a 2020 South Korean television series

=== Other uses in arts, entertainment, and media ===
- Mémorial, the official gazette of Luxembourg
- Memorial: Letters from American Soldiers, a 1991 documentary film
- Memorial (novel), a 2020 novel by Bryan Washington
- The Memorial (novel), a 1932 novel by Christopher Isherwood

== Groups and organizations ==
- Memorial (society), an international society in memory and for rehabilitation of victims of political repression in the USSR
- Memorial Sloan–Kettering Cancer Center, a cancer treatment and research institution in New York City
- Memorial University of Newfoundland, a university located in St. John's, Newfoundland and Labrador, Canada
- OBD Memorial, online data of Soviet personnel killed or missing in or after the Second World War

== Other uses ==
- Memorial (liturgy), a feast day of rank lower than a solemnity or feast
- Memorial (Jehovah's Witnesses), an annual commemoration of the death of Jesus
- Memorial Tournament, a PGA Tour golf tournament founded by Jack Nicklaus
- Memorials were the original deeds registered and held by the South Australian General Registry Office in the early days of the colony
- Memorial (law), legal document which contains a statement of facts or a summary
- Memorial to the throne, an official communication to the emperor of China

== See also ==
- In Memoriam (disambiguation)
- Memorial book
- Memorial Day
- Memorial Union (disambiguation)
- Memorial High School
- Memorial Park (disambiguation)
- Memory (disambiguation)
- Remembrance (disambiguation)
