= Remembrances =

Remembrances may refer to:

- Remembrances (David Murray album), 1991
- Remembrances (The Lucy Show album), 2011

== See also ==
- Remembrance (disambiguation)
