= In Memoriam =

In memoriam is a Latin phrase equivalent to "in memory (of)", referring to remembering or honouring a deceased person.

In Memoriam may refer to:

== Music ==
=== Classical compositions ===
- Overture in C, "In Memoriam", by Arthur Sullivan, 1866
- In Memoriam: President Garfield's Funeral March, by John Philip Sousa, 1881
- In Memoriam, song cycle by Liza Lehmann, 1899
- In Memoriam (Sibelius), a funeral march by Jean Sibelius, 1910
- In Memoriam, a symphonic poem by Havergal Brian, 1910
- In Memoriam, an orchestral piece by Arnold Bax, 1916
- In memoriam (Moore), a symphonic poem by Douglas Moore, 1943
- In Memoriam, an orchestral piece by Lepo Sumera, 1972
- In Memoriam..., an orchestral arrangement by Alfred Schnittke of his Piano Quintet, 1972/1978
- In Memoriam, a composition by Lewis Spratlan, 2009

=== Albums ===
- In Memoriam: Hungarian Composers, Victims Of The Holocaust, a 2008 album by various artists
- In Memoriam, a 2005 album by Living Sacrifice
- In Memoriam (Modern Jazz Quartet album), 1973
- In Memoriam: Margaret Thatcher, a 2013 EP by Chumbawamba
- In Memoriam (Small Faces album), 1969

=== Songs ===
- "In Memoriam", by Apocalyptica from the 2000 album Cult
- "In Memoriam", by Despised Icon from the 2025 album Shadow Work
- "In Memoriam", by Evile from the 2011 album Five Serpent's Teeth
- "In Memoriam", by HammerFall from the 2002 album Crimson Thunder
- "In Memoriam", by Moonspell from the 2006 album Memorial
- "In Memoriam", by Steve Hackett from the 1999 album Darktown
- "In Memoriam", by the Oh Hellos from the 2012 album Through the Deep, Dark Valley
- "Loss (In Memoriam)", by Saturnus from the 2000 album Martyre

== Other uses ==
- In memoriam (photograph), a 1902 photograph by Edward Steichen
- In Memoriam (1977 film), a Spanish film
- In Memoriam (2026 film), an American comedy film
- "In Memoriam A.H.H." or "In Memoriam", an 1850 poem by Alfred, Lord Tennyson
- In Memoriam (video game), 2003
- "In Memoriam" (Homeland), an episode of Homeland
- In Memoriam, a 2023 novel by Alice Winn
- "In Memoriam", several satirical poems by fictitious writer E. J. Thribb for Private Eye
- In memoriam segment, a memorial included in an awards show or other aired event
- לזכר, the Hebrew word represented in the design of the National Holocaust Names Memorial (Amsterdam)

== See also ==
- Memorial (disambiguation)
- Memoriam, an English band
- In Memoriam, about the In Memoriam wiki, a former Wikimedia project on the September 11, 2001, attacks
- Obituary
