= Sagadahoc =

Sagadahoc refers to more than one geographic feature of the U.S.:

- Sagadahoc County, Maine
- Sagadahoc Bridge, Maine
- An archaic name for the Kennebec River in Maine
- Territory of Sagadahock
