= Remembrance =

Remembrance is the act of remembering, the ability to remember, or a memorial.

Remembrance or Remembrances may also refer to:

== Events ==
- Category:Remembrance days
  - Day of Remembrance for Truth and Justice, a commemorative day observed by Argentina
  - Remembrance Day, a commemorative day observed by many Commonwealth countries
  - Remembrance of the Dead, held annually on May 4 in the Netherlands
  - Remembrance Sunday (UK), is the second Sunday in November, the Sunday nearest to 11 November (Armistice Day)
- Remembrance Day bombing, took place on 8 November 1987 in Enniskillen, County Fermanagh, Northern Ireland
- Remembrance of Muharram, an important period of mourning in the Shi'a branch of Islam

== Film and television ==
- Remembrance (1922 film), American drama film directed and written by Rupert Hughes
- Remembrance (1982 film), British film directed by Colin Gregg
- Remembrance (1996 film), TV film based on the novel by Danielle Steel
- Remembrance (2001 film), Canadian short film, a wartime romance among trainee spies
- Remembrance (2011 film), German film, a wartime romance in a concentration camp
- "Remembrances", a 2014 episode of The Legend of Korra
- "Remembrance" (Star Trek: Picard), an episode of Star Trek: Picard

== Music ==
- Remembrance: A Memorial Benefit, a 2001 album by American pianist George Winston
- Remembrance (Cecil Taylor and Louis Moholo album), 1988
- Remembrance (Chick Corea and Béla Fleck album), 2024
- Remembrance (Elvin Jones album), 1978
- Remembrance (Joe McPhee album), recorded 2001 and released in 2005
- Remembrance (Ketil Bjørnstad album), 2008
- Remembrance (EP), a 2014 EP by Suicideyear
- Remembrance (band), a Christian metalcore band
- Remembrances (David Murray album), 1991
- Remembrances (The Lucy Show album), 2011
- "Remembrance", a song by Balmorhea from the 2009 album All Is Wild, All Is Silent
- "Remembrance", a song by Cypecore from the 2018 album The Alliance
- "Remembrance", a song by God Is an Astronaut from the 2002 album The End of the Beginning
- "Remembrance", a song by Gojira from the 2003 album The Link
- "Remembrance", a song by Insomnium from the 2026 album Netherworlds
- "Remembrance", a song by Sinergy from the 2002 album Suicide by My Side

== Literature ==
- Remembrance (novel), a 2016 novel by Meg Cabot
- Remembrance, a 1977 play by Derek Walcott
- Remembrance, a 1981 novel by Danielle Steel
- Remembrance, a 2002 novel by Theresa Breslin

== See also ==
- Remembrancer, originally one of certain subordinate officers of the English Exchequer
- Remember (disambiguation)
- Memorial (disambiguation)
