= All Is Wild, All Is Silent =

Studio album by Balmorhea
- Released: March 10, 2009
- Genre: Post-rock, indie rock
- Length: 41:44
- Label: Western Vinyl

Balmorhea chronology
Rivers Arms (2008)	All Is Wild, All Is Silent (2009)	All Is Wild, All Is Silent: Remixes (2009)

Professional ratings
Review scores
Source	Rating
Allmusic	4.5/5 stars
Pitchfork Media	7.6/10
Sputnikmusic	3.5/5 stars

All Is Wild, All Is Silent is the third studio album by post-rock band Balmorhea, released by Western Vinyl on March 10, 2009. For this album, Aisha Burns, Travis Chapman, Nicole Kern, and Taylor Tehan were recruited.

== Track listing ==
All Is Wild, All Is Silent
No.	Title	Length
1.	"Settler"	6:39
2.	"March 4, 1831"	2:06
3.	"Harm and Boon"	8:05
4.	"Elegy"	2:19
5.	"Remembrance"	5:49
6.	"Coahuila"	3:31
7.	"Night in the Draw"	4:09
8.	"Truth"	7:05
9.	"November 1, 1832"	2:32

== Personnel ==
- Aisha Burns – violin
- Travis Chapman – upright bass
- Jesy Fortino – vocals
- Nicole Kern – cello
- Michael Muller – guitar, piano, vocals
- Rob Lowe – banjo, guitar, piano, vocals, melodica
- Taylor Tehan – drums

and

- Andrew Hernandez – engineer, mixing
- Jeff Lipton – mastering
- Maria Rice – audio engineer
