= MUB =

MUB may refer to:

- Maun Airport, Botswana, from its IATA airport code
- Medical University of Bahrain
- Memorial Union Building (disambiguation), any one of several buildings
- Musselburgh railway station, Scotland, from its National Rail code
- Mutually unbiased bases, a measurement concept in quantum information theory
- Bethnahrin National Council, a left wing Assyrian nationalist organization in the Middle East
