= Suicide barrier =

Barrier to prevent suicide from a tall structure

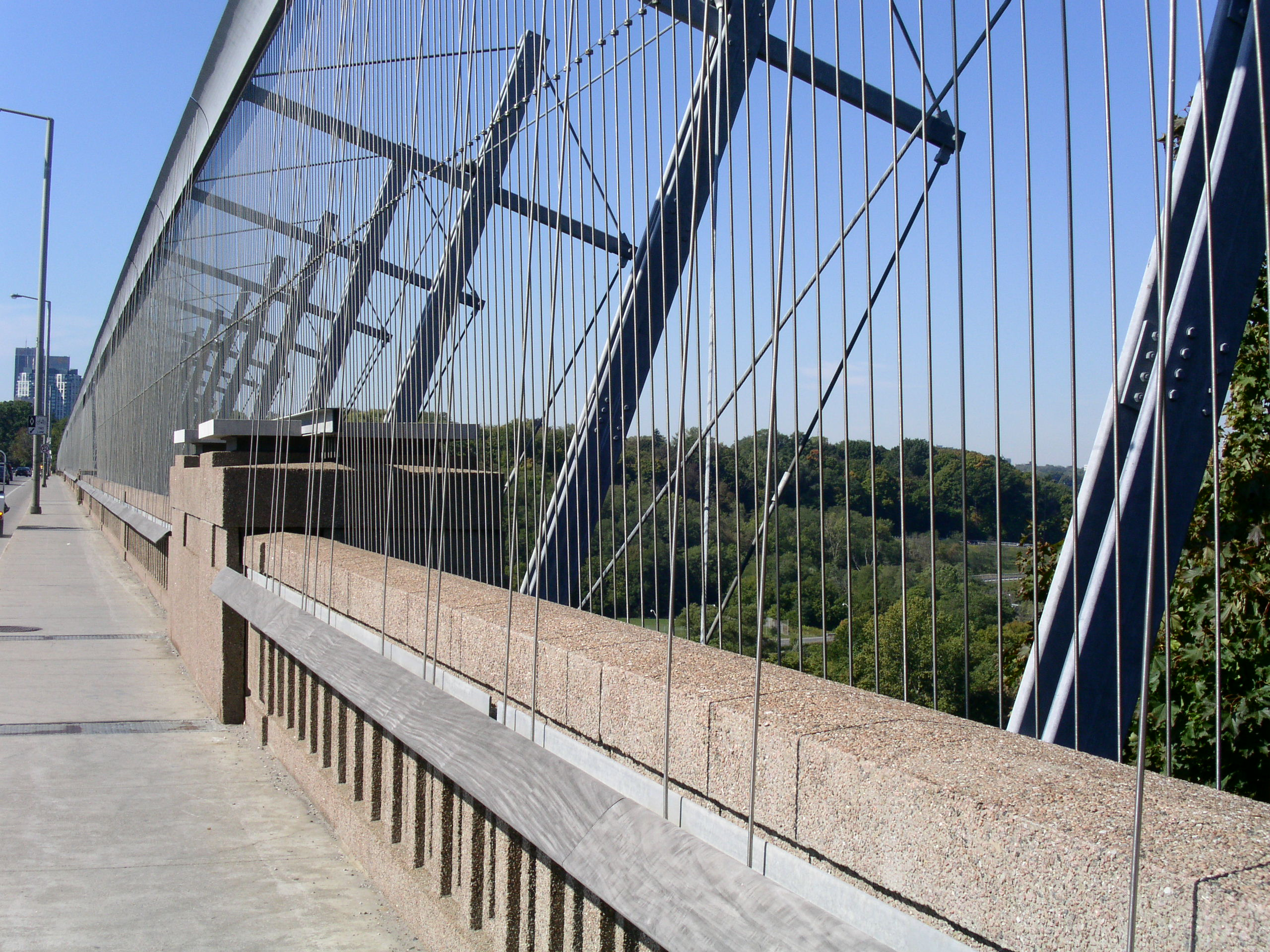
The Luminous Veil on Toronto's Prince Edward Viaduct has prevented jumping suicides from occurring there, but has likely driven people to commit suicide at other bridges in the city. Suicide barrier atop the Empire State Building in New York

A suicide barrier is a structure intended to deter people from attempting suicide by deliberately jumping from a high place on a structure. Suicide barriers often consist of nets, metal screening, and fencing. Suicide barriers may be placed on tall bridges (such as those deemed "suicide bridges"), observation decks, and other tall structures.

Suicide barriers may be erected for a variety of purposes beyond saving the lives of those attempting suicide. They are commonly used on pedestrian bridges that cross over train tracks or highways to prevent injury to other members of the public caused by jumping suicides and to keep transportation systems functioning efficiently. Similar reasoning is often cited for their use in subways. Suicide barriers have been employed to prevent trauma in neighbors who live in close proximity to jumping suicide hotspots, as has been done in cities such as Seattle. Media attention associated with jumping has also figured into the decision to install barriers in certain locations that wish to avoid association of their building or landmark with suicides.

== Forms and materials ==
Suicide barriers come in a variety of forms and are constructed from sturdy materials. Most suicide barriers are fence-like metal structures that are made difficult to climb by inward curving tops.

Glass barriers have been deployed in some places to provide greater transparency and visual appeal. After an imposing fence was removed on the Grafton Bridge of Auckland, New Zealand, jumping suicides increased, and a glass barrier was installed.

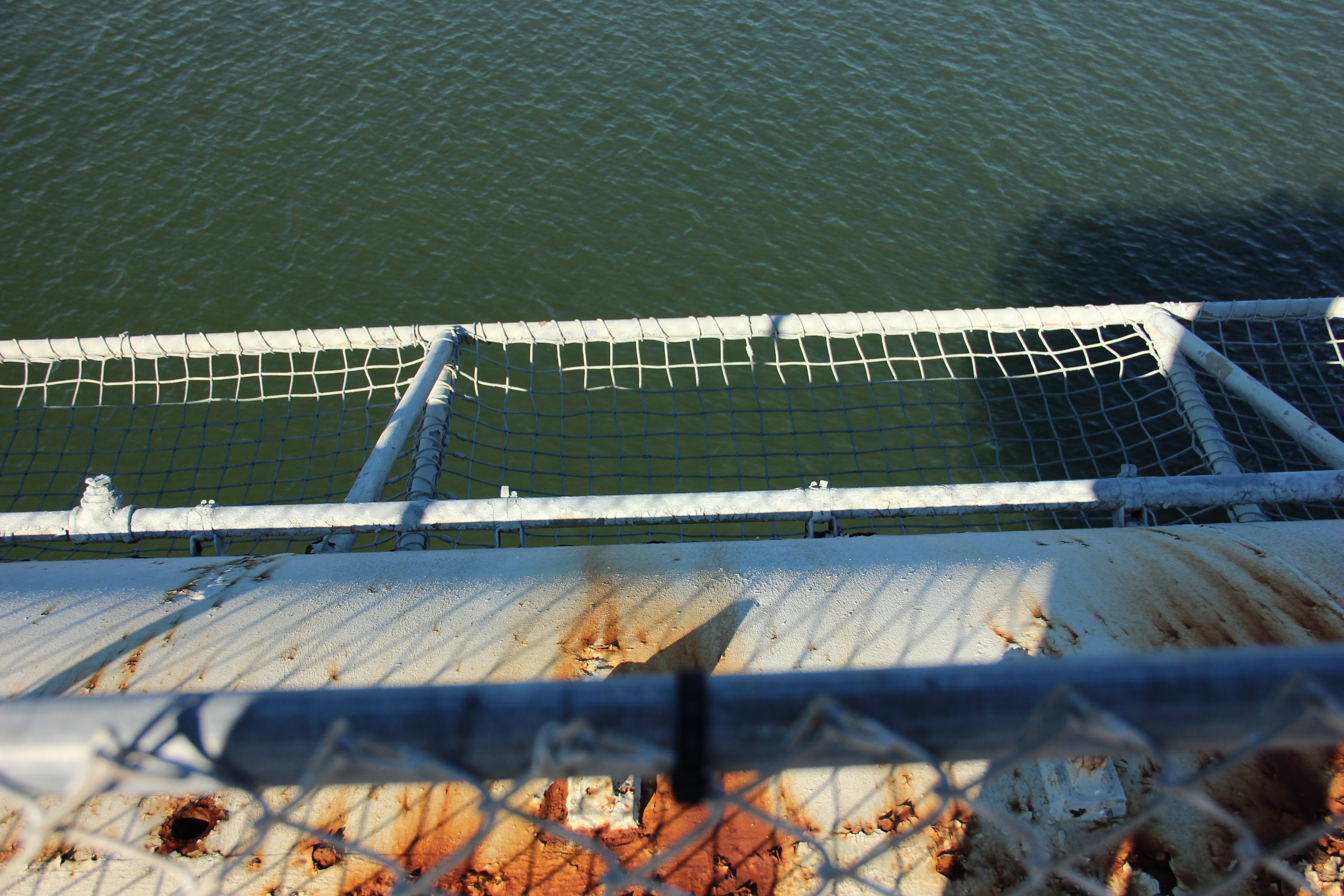
Suicide nets on the USS Yorktown in Mount Pleasant, South Carolina.

Suicide barriers also include nets that extend from the structure or hang below it in order to preserve views outward. Suicide nets have been used on the Bern Muenster Terrace in Bern, Switzerland, and the Cornell University campus in Ithaca, New York. In January 2024, a suicide prevention net was installed on the full length of the Golden Gate Bridge. The net consists of a stainless steel mesh suspended 20 feet below the sidewalk and out 20 feet over the water.

== Efficacy ==
Research has shown suicidal thinking is often short-lived. Those who attempted suicide from the Golden Gate Bridge and were stopped in the process by a person did not go on to die by suicide by some other means. There are also a variety of examples that show restricting means of suicide have been associated with the overall reduction of it. However, whether suicide barriers on high places specifically are effective at saving lives is unclear and likely depends on both physical and cultural context.

Many studies have shown that well-designed suicide barriers stop people from jumping at a particular site, but no study has found the overall suicide rate within an area decreased significantly after a barrier went up as a result of that barrier. The effect of a suicide barrier on local jumping suicide rates has been mixed. Additionally, unlike guns, access to suicide or landmark bridges has not been found to be associated with higher overall suicide rates in Switzerland or the U.S.

Some case studies and large-scale studies are summarized below.

=== Prince Edward Viaduct / Bloor Street Viaduct ===
The Bloor Street Viaduct, also known as the Prince Edward Viaduct, was the second most deadly suicide bridge in North America at the time a custom designed suicide barrier known as the "Luminous Veil" was erected there. An initial study of that barrier's effectiveness, published in the British Medical Journal in 2010, showed in the four years after the barrier went up at the Bloor Street Viaduct, no more suicides occurred on that site. However, the jumping suicide rate in the city did not change in a way that was statistically significant, when adjusted for changes in the population. Jumping suicides from the neighbouring Leaside Bridge, along with other bridges and structures in Toronto increased. There was a decrease in the overall suicide rate in Toronto during this time, but it could not be credited to the barrier, since there was no reduction in jumping suicide.

A longer-term study of the Bloor Street Viaduct released in 2017 highlighted that there had only been one suicide on the Bloor Street Viaduct in the 11 years after the barrier went up, and there was a statistically significant decrease in suicide on bridges in Toronto in the 11 years after the barrier went up when adjusted for changes in the population. This led the authors, who had hypothesized that the barrier would work, to declare the barrier to be having an impact. However, the study could not rule out that suicides were being displaced to other sites or other means. The report notes there was not a significant difference between the jumping suicide rate in Toronto in the 11 years before and after the barrier went up (57.0/year before and 51.3/year after when corrected for population increases), so it cannot be concluded that site substitution did not take place. The small number of suicides by jumping also makes it impossible to determine whether other means were being substituted. As the authors note, the study may also be subject to an ecological fallacy, as this was a natural experiment and the two populations being compared may not be comparable. While correcting for the increase in population, the authors have not corrected for changes to Toronto's foreign-born population. Toronto experienced massive foreign-born immigration during the period of the study, and Canadian immigrants have suicide rates half those of Canadian-born.

=== Bern Minster Terrace ===
A study of the Minster Terrace in Bern, Switzerland, found a barrier eliminated suicides on that site, and it claims to have found a drop in the jumping suicides locally; however it did not compare the actual jumping rate before and after the barrier went up. Rather it compared the actual jumping rate to an estimate created based on just four years of data, ignoring the trend of jumping suicide over the previous decade. Jumping suicides in Bern did not actually significantly decrease after the barrier went up. There was only one less jumping suicide in Bern in the four years after the barrier went up compared to the four years before.

=== Clifton Suspension Bridge and Memorial Bridge ===
A study on the Clifton Suspension Bridge in Bristol, England, found a decrease in jumping suicides on site and among men in the area after a barrier went up. Another set of data comes from the Memorial Bridge over the Kennebec River in Augusta, Maine, where 14 people jumped to their deaths before a barrier went up in 1983. The barrier eliminated suicides from the bridge, and a study of suicides in the area during the two decades before and after installation of the barrier found no increase in jumping from high structures in Augusta. In both cases, overall suicide rates did not significantly decrease, though they would be unlikely to given the very small percentage of the suicides in the area that involved those sites.

=== Duke Ellington Bridge ===
After a barrier was built at Duke Ellington Bridge in Washington, D.C., there were no further suicides from that bridge, and research showed the number of suicides from a nearby bridge did not increase. However, as one author of this study pointed out, there was no reason to believe that suicide attempts would be limited to these two bridges.
