= Memory (disambiguation) =

Memory is an organism's ability to store, retain, and recall information.

Memory may also refer to:

== Science and technology ==
=== Biology, psychology, and sociology ===
- Adaptive memory, memory systems that have evolved to help retain survival-and-fitness related information
- Body memory, the hypothetical memory function of individual body parts or cells
- Collective memory, memory that is shared, passed on and constructed by a group or modern society
- Genetic memory (psychology), present at birth and exists in the absence of sensory experience
- Immunological memory, a characteristic of the adaptive immunity
- Implicit memory, a type in which previous experiences help to perform a task with no awareness of those experiences
- Long-term memory, the ability of the brain to store and recover memories
- Procedural memory, a type most frequently below conscious awareness that helps perform particular types of action
  - Muscle memory, a form of procedural memory also known as motor learning
- Working memory or short-term memory, the ability of the brain (or a computer) to temporarily store data while processing it

=== Computing ===
- Computer data storage, computer components, devices, and recording media that retain digital data
- Semiconductor memory, electronic memory used in digital electronics, for example:
  - Computer memory, devices used to store data or programs on a temporary or permanent basis for use in a computer
  - Non-volatile memory, semiconductor memory that can retain the stored information even when not powered
  - Read-only memory, semiconductor memory that cannot be modified
  - Volatile memory, semiconductor memory that requires power to maintain the stored information

=== Other uses in science and technology ===
- Battery memory, an effect observed in nickel cadmium rechargeable batteries that causes them to hold less charge
- Long memory, a statistical property in which intertemporal dependence decays only slowly
- Memory foam, a material that molds to the shape of a warm body but returns to its original shape on cooling
- Plastic deformation of some elastic material that has been subjected to prolonged stress
- Shape-memory alloy can be deformed when cold but returns to its pre-deformed ("remembered") shape when heated

== Arts and media ==
=== Film and television ===
- Memory, a 1971 documentary by Grigori Chukhrai
- Memory, 2004 short film featuring Kimberly Norris Guerrero
- Memory (2006 film), a techno-thriller by Bennett Joshua Davlin
- Memory (2008 film), a Thai horror film
- Memory (TV series), a 2016 South Korean drama
- "Memory" (Not Going Out), a 2019 television episode
- Memory (2022 film), an American action-thriller film starring Liam Neeson
- Memory (2023 film), an English-language drama film starring Jessica Chastain and Peter Sarsgaard

=== Literature ===
- "Memory" (Poul Anderson), a 1957 science fiction narration by Poul Anderson
- Memory (Bujold novel), a 1996 novel in the Vorkosigan Saga by Lois McMaster Bujold
- "Memory" (Stephen King), a short story by Stephen King
- "Memory" (H. P. Lovecraft), a short story by H.P. Lovecraft
- Memory, a 1987 novel by Margaret Mahy
- Memory (Westlake novel), 2010, by Donald E. Westlake

=== Music ===
==== Albums ====
- Memory (Dan Michaelson and The Coastguards album), 2016
- Memory (EP), by Mamamoo, 2016
- Memory (Vivian Girls album), 2019
- Memory, a 2018 Hélène Grimaud album

==== Songs ====
- "Memory" (Cats song), a song from the 1981 musical Cats
- "Memory" (Sugarcult song), 2004
- "Memory" (Kane Brown and Blackbear song), 2021
- "Memory", a 1912 art song by the classical composer John Ireland on lyrics by the poet William Blake
- "Memory", a 1959 art song by the classical composer Ned Rorem on lyrics by the poet Theodore Roethke
- "Memory", a 2007 song by Sarah Nixey from Sing, Memory
- "Memory", a track from the soundtrack of the 2015 video game Undertale by Toby Fox

=== Painting and sculpture ===
- Memory (French), an 1886–1887 marble sculpture by Daniel Chester French
- Memory (Dallin), a 1924 bronze sculpture by Cyrus E. Dallin
- Memory, the Heart, also known as Memory, a 1937 painting by Frida Kahlo

== Other uses ==
- Pamyat (Память, "memory"), a Russian ultra-nationalist organization

== See also ==
- Memories (disambiguation)
- Meme
- Art of memory
- Concentration (game) or "Memory", a card game
