= Memorial Union Building =

Memorial Union Building may refer to:

- Memorial Union Building (MTU), Michigan Technological University
- Memorial Union Building (New Hampshire), University of New Hampshire

== See also ==
- Memorial Union (disambiguation)
