= Rivers Arms =

Studio album by Balmorhea
- Released: February 12, 2008
- Genre: Post-rock, neoclassical new-age music
- Length: 58:53
- Label: Western Vinyl

Balmorhea chronology
Balmorhea (2007)	Rivers Arms (2008)	All Is Wild, All Is Silent (2009)

Professional ratings
Review scores
Source	Rating
Allmusic	3/5 stars
Pitchfork Media	7.8/10

Rivers Arms is the second studio album by post-rock band Balmorhea, released by Western Vinyl on January 1, 2008, then re-released on February 12, 2008. For this album, Aisha Burns, Erin Lance, and Jacob Glenn-Levin were recruited.

== Track listing ==
Rivers arms
No.	Title	Length
1.	"San Solomon"	3:43
2.	"Lament"	3:35
3.	"The Summer"	3:56
4.	"The Winter"	5:51
5.	"Greyish Tapering Ash"	3:41
6.	"Baleen Morning"	3:44
7.	"Barefoot Pilgrims"	4:53
8.	"Context"	4:02
9.	"Process"	6:20
10.	"Divisadero"	3:09
11.	"Limmat"	3:22
12.	"Theme No. 1"	5:11
13.	"Windansea"	3:56
14.	"San Solomon (Reprise)"	3:30

== Personnel ==
- Aisha Burns – violin
- Erin Lance – cello
- Jacob Glenn-Levin – guitar, bass
- Carl Saff – mastering
