= Mania (The Lucy Show album) =

Studio album by The Lucy Show
- Released: 1986
- Recorded: UK
- Genre: Rock, alternative rock, new wave
- Length: 57:50 (2005 reissue)
- Label: Big Time Records
- Producer: John Leckie

The Lucy Show chronology
...undone (1985)	Mania (1986)	Remembrances (2011)

Professional ratings
Review scores
Source	Rating
AllMusic	4/5 stars
College Music Journal	favorable

Mania was released in 1986 in the UK and the U.S. on Big Time Records. It was The Lucy Show's second, and final, album. The band changed direction from the richly atmospheric and melancholy ...undone and aimed for a more upbeat, commercial sound. The album received better critical reviews than the debut album, and sold more copies, topping the CMJ charts in the US and earning some MTV airplay for the music video of the song, "A Million Things". However, Big Time Records went bankrupt, leaving The Lucy Show once again without a label. They continued to tour and record for some time, then called it quits in 1988. In 2005, the Words on Music label issued the album on CD for the first time, adding several bonus tracks.

== Track listing ==
1. Land and the Life – 2:21
2. View From The Outside – 3:37
3. Sojourn's End – 3:50
4. Sad September – 3:45
5. A Million Things – 3:09
6. Sun and Moon – 3:49
7. Shame – 2:47
8. Melody – 3:24
9. Part of Me Now – 4:04
10. New Message – 4:53

Bonus Tracks on the 2005 CD Reissue

1. Jam in E – 2.38
2. Invitation – 2.41
3. Civil Servant – 3.04
4. Sun and Moon (Live) – 3.27
5. View from the Outside (Live) – 3.33
6. New Message (Basement Demo) – 3.05
7. A Million Things (Original Mix) – 3.32

== Personnel ==
The Lucy Show consisted of:

- Mark Bandola – vocals, guitar, keyboards
- Rob Vandeven – vocals, bass guitar
- Pete Barraclough – guitars, keyboards
- Bryan Hudspeth – drums

with:

- Roddy Lorimer – trumpet
- Eddie Twang – harp
- Charlie Rayner – backing vocalist
- David Ruffy – drums on "New Message"
