= ...Undone =

...undone

Studio album by The Lucy Show
- Released: 1985
- Recorded: London, UK
- Genre: post-punk, neo-psychedelia, new wave
- Length: 44:15
- Label: A&M; Words on Music
- Producer: Steve Lovell and Steve Power

The Lucy Show chronology
...undone (1985)	Mania (1986)

Professional ratings
Review scores
Source	Rating
AllMusic	4/5 stars
Bloomberg News	4/5 stars
College Music Journal	favorable

...undone was released in 1985 in the UK and the U.S. on A&M Records. It was The Lucy Show's debut album. The band's sound at that time was brooding and melancholic, heavily influenced by – and favorably compared to – The Cure, Comsat Angels, and Joy Division. The album contains what are generally considered The Lucy Show's two best songs, "Ephemeral (This is no Heaven)" and "Undone". Although it sold reasonably well in the United States, topping the CMJ charts there, the band was dropped by A&M UK at the end of the year, sending them in search of a new label. In 2009, ...undone was released on CD for the first time by the Words on Music label.

== Track listing ==
No.	Title	Length
1.	"Ephemeral (This is no Heaven)"	3:42
2.	"Resistance"	3:59
3.	"Come Back To The Living"	3:39
4.	"The White Space"	4:17
5.	"Wipe Out"	3:11
6.	"Twister"	3:26
7.	"Undone"	4:04
8.	"Remain"	3:47
9.	"Better On The Hard Side"	5:22
10.	"Remembrances"	3:47
11.	"Dream Days"	4:49

== Personnel ==
The Lucy Show consisted of:

- Mark Bandola – vocals, guitar, keyboards
- Rob Vandeven – vocals, bass guitar
- Pete Barraclough – guitars, keyboards
- Bryan Hudspeth – drums

with:

- Fiona Stephen – violin on "Better on the Hard Side", "The White Space", and "Resistance"
