= A Man in a Hurry =

2018 French comedy-drama film

- Directed by: Hervé Mimran
- Written by: Hervé Mimran; Hélène Fillières
- Produced by: Matthieu Tarot
- Starring: Fabrice Luchini; Leïla Bekhti
- Cinematography: Jérôme Alméras
- Edited by: Célia Lafitedupont
- Music by: Balmorhea
- Distributed by: Gaumont
- Release date: 28 September 2018
- Running time: 100 min
- Country: France
- Language: French
- Budget: $8.5 million
- Box office: $6 million

A Man in a Hurry (French: Un homme pressé) is a 2018 French comedy-drama film directed by Hervé Mimran.

== Cast ==
- Fabrice Luchini as Alain Wapler
- Leïla Bekhti as Jeanne
- Rebecca Marder as Julia
- Igor Gotesman as Vincent
