= Memorial Bridge =

Memorial Bridge may refer to:

Thailand

- Memorial Bridge (Bangkok)

United States

- Memorial Bridge (Augusta, Maine)
- Memorial Bridge (Connellsville), Pennsylvania
- Memorial Bridge (Massachusetts), in Springfield
- Memorial Bridge (Palatka, Florida)
- Memorial Bridge (Parkersburg, West Virginia)
- Memorial Bridge (Portsmouth, New Hampshire)
- Memorial Bridge (Roanoke, Virginia)
- Arlington Memorial Bridge, between Virginia and Washington, D.C.
