= Balmorhea (band) =

American instrumental duo

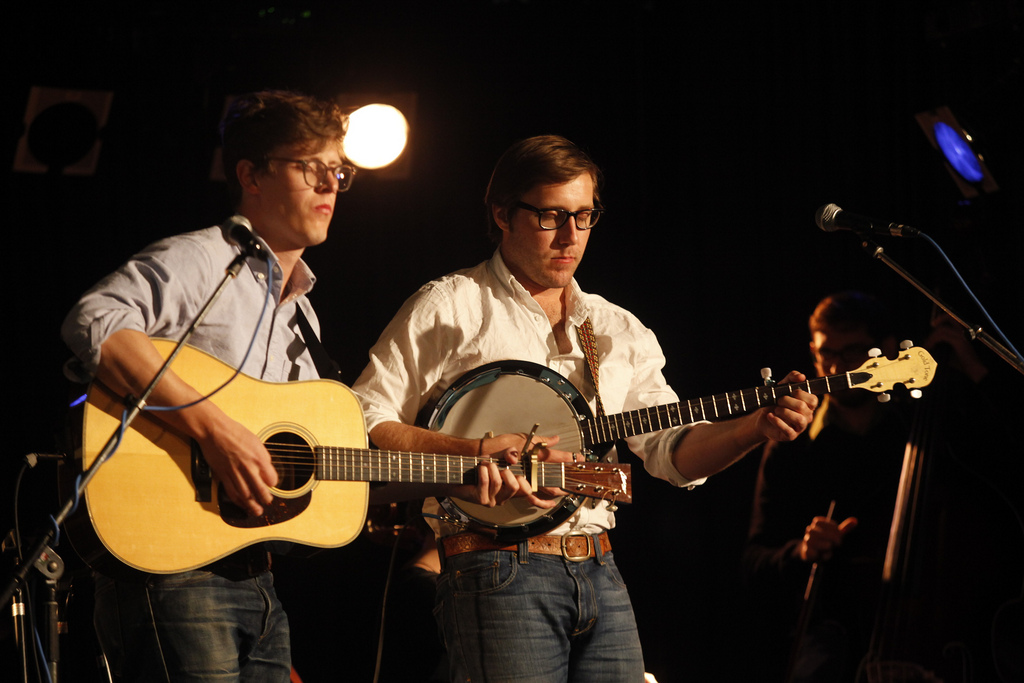
- Balmorhea performing in 2010

Background information
- Origin: Austin, Texas, US
- Genres: Post-rock; minimal music
- Years active: 2006–present
- Labels: Western Vinyl; Balmorhea Music; Deutsche Grammophon/Universal Classics
- Members: Rob Lowe; Michael Muller
- Past members: Nicole Kern; Erin Lance; David Wiley; Taylor Tehan; Mike Bell; Travis Chapman; Kendall Clark; Dylan Rieck; Aisha Burns; Jeffrey Olson; Nino Soberon; Sam Pankey
- Website: balmorheamusic.com

Balmorhea (pronounced bal-mə-ray) is an American minimalist instrumental duo from Austin, Texas, formed in 2006 by Rob Lowe and Michael Muller. Throughout the project's history, numerous musicians have rotated through its ranks, leading to a diverse range of sounds. Balmorhea have been influenced by William Ackerman, the Six Parts Seven, Tortoise, Rachel's, Gillian Welch, Max Richter, Arvo Pärt, and John Cage.

== History ==
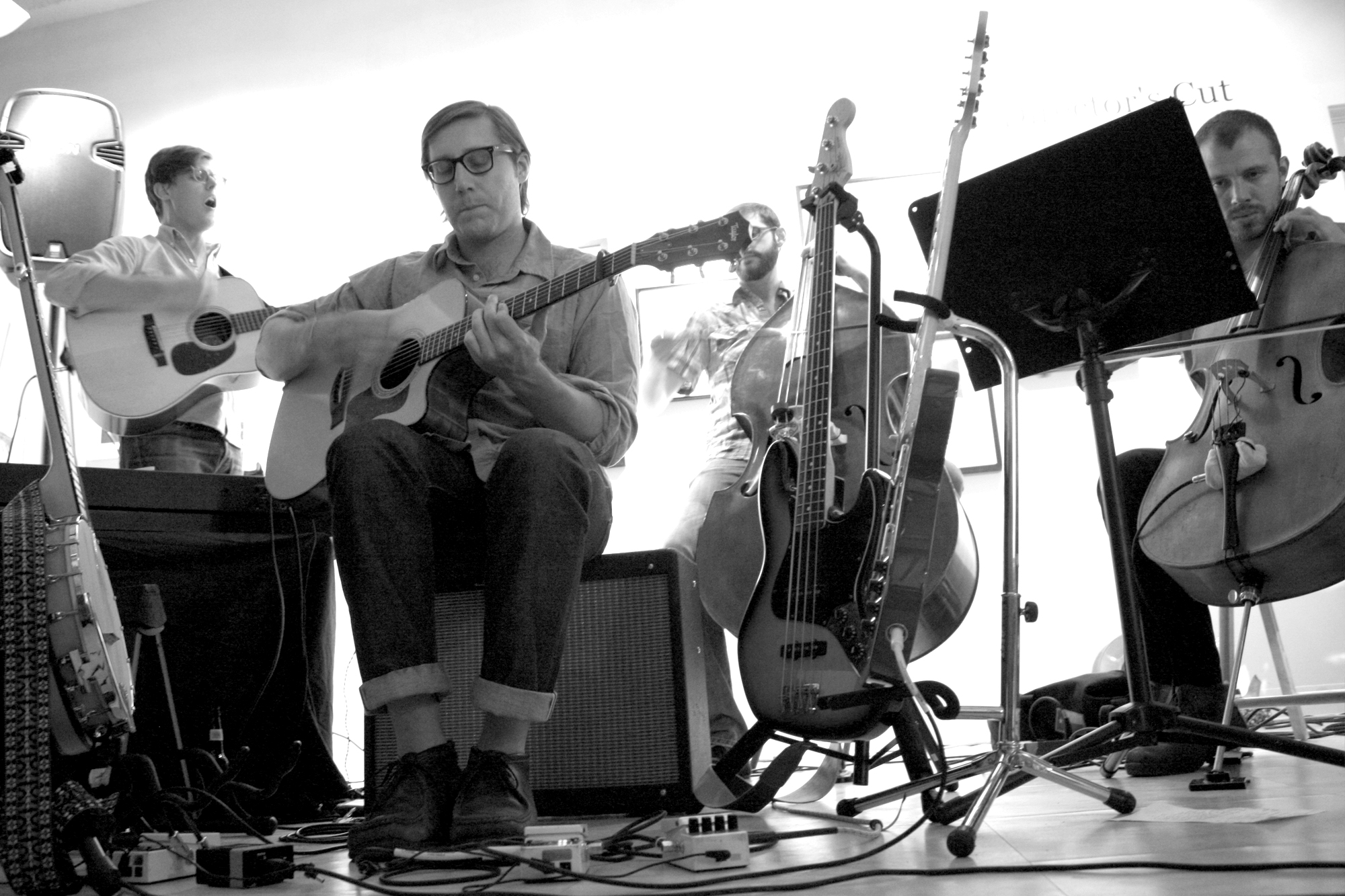
Balmorhea performing in 2010

The band independently released their debut, self-titled album in April 2007, and their second, Rivers Arms, in February 2008. They also issued a limited-edition tour EP the same year. Their third full-length album, All is Wild, All is Silent, was published on Western Vinyl in 2009. Their fourth record, Constellations, was issued in February 2010, and their fifth, Stranger, came out in October 2012.

In 2017, after a period of five years, Balmorhea returned as the original duo with their sixth studio album, Clear Language. In 2021, the band issued a series of singles under Deutsche Grammophon, several of which were later re-released on their next album, The Wind. Their 2023 record, Pendant World, followed a similar pattern of releases. As a duo once more, this era of their music is marked by a turn to more minimalistic and experimental works, in contrast to their previous material.

The song "Bowsprit", from the album Constellations, was used as the opening theme for the SundanceTV television series Rectify, and "Remembrance", from All Is Wild, All Is Silent, was featured within the 2015 Turkish film Delibal. Their 2018 single Clouds was composed for the French film Un homme pressé, which also featured the song "Remembrance".

Balmorhea, called "an exemplary experiment in restraint" by The New Yorker, have toured the US and Europe and performed with such musicians as Tortoise, Thurston Moore, Fleet Foxes, Mono, CocoRosie, Sharon Van Etten, Damien Jurado, Efterklang, This Will Destroy You. They have appeared at Austin City Limits Music Festival, SXSW, and Fun Fun Fun Fest, among others. Their music has been featured and reviewed by Pitchfork, the BBC, Paste, Interview Magazine, NME, The Wall Street Journal, NPR, The Atlantic, and many more.

== Band members ==
Current

- Rob Lowe – guitar, piano
- Michael Muller – guitar, bass guitar

Past

- Jeff Olson – drums, vibraphone
- Sam Pankey – double bass, bass guitar
- Nino Soberon – cello, guitar
- Aisha Burns – violin, vocals
- Mike Bell – drums
- Bruce Blay – drums
- Travis Chapman – double bass, bass guitar
- Kendall Clark – drums, vibraphone
- Jacob Glenn-Levin – bass guitar
- Nicole Kern – cello
- Erin Lance – cello
- Dylan Rieck – cello
- Taylor Tehan – drums
- Dave Wiley – cello

== Discography ==
=== Studio albums ===
- Balmorhea (2007)
- Rivers Arms (2008)
- All Is Wild, All Is Silent (2009)
- Constellations (2010)
- Stranger (2012)
- Clear Language (2017)
- The Wind (2021)
- Pendant World (2023)

=== EPs ===
- Tour EP (2008)

=== Live albums ===
- Live at Sint-Elisabethkerk (2011)
- The Wind – Live in Marfa (2022)

=== Soundtrack albums ===
- Guest Room (2009)
- The Trap (2025)

=== Remix albums ===
- All Is Wild, All Is Silent Remixes (2009)
- Candor / Clamor Remixes (2010)
- Clear Language Reworked (2018)

=== Singles ===
- "Candor / Clamor" (2010)
- "Heir" (2014)
- "Chime / Shone" (2018)
- "The Most Fleeting" (2018)
- "Clouds" (2018) – soundtrack for Un homme pressé
- "Time in the Hand" (2021)
- "Coventry Carol" (2021)
- "Solanales" (2022)
- "Of Hopeful Green Woven" (2022)
- "Before Barbed Wire" (2024)
