= Carlton Bridge =

Rail bridge in Bath and Woolwich, Maine

Coordinates: 43.9114°N 69.8079°W

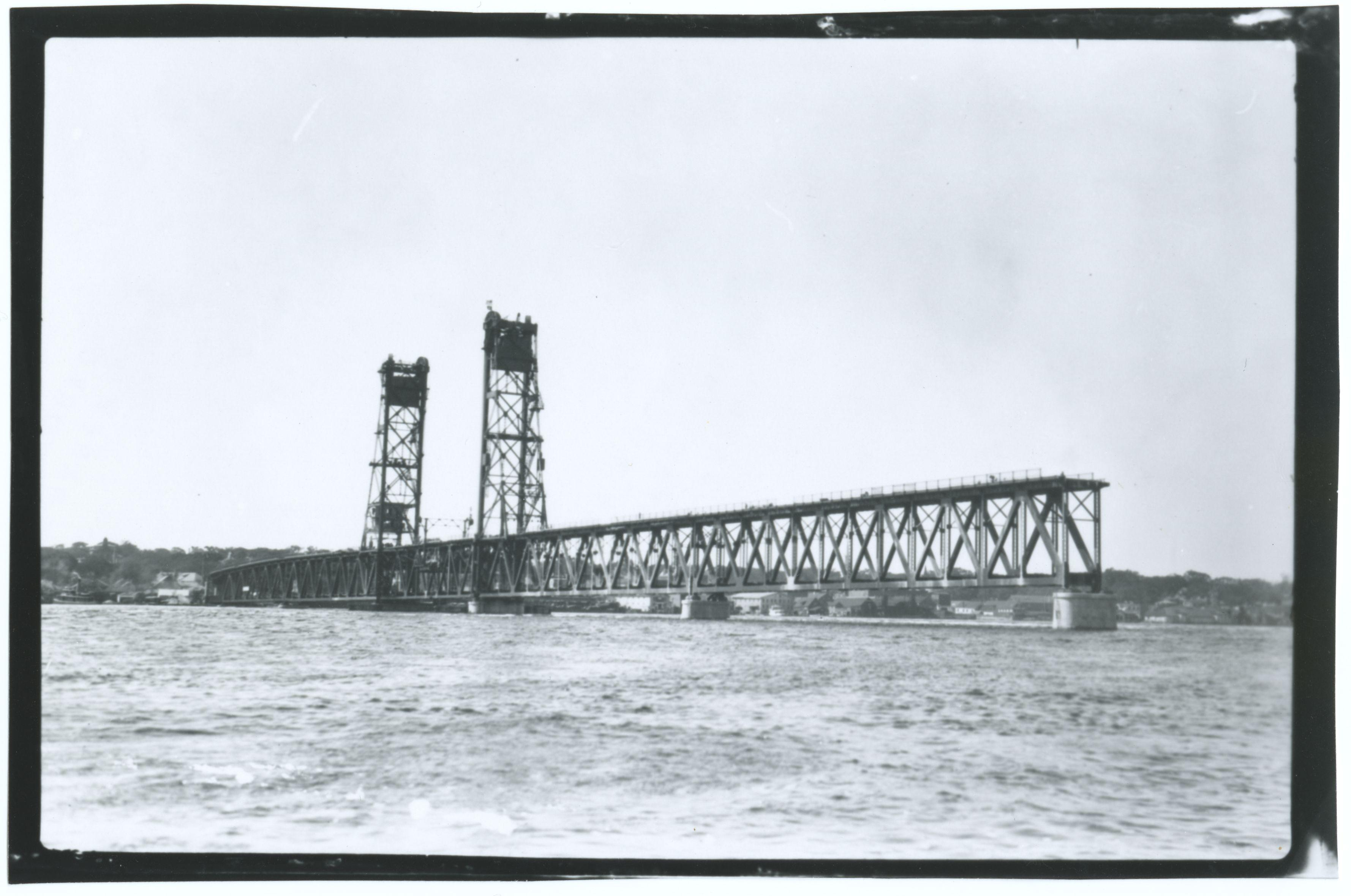
During construction, c.1927

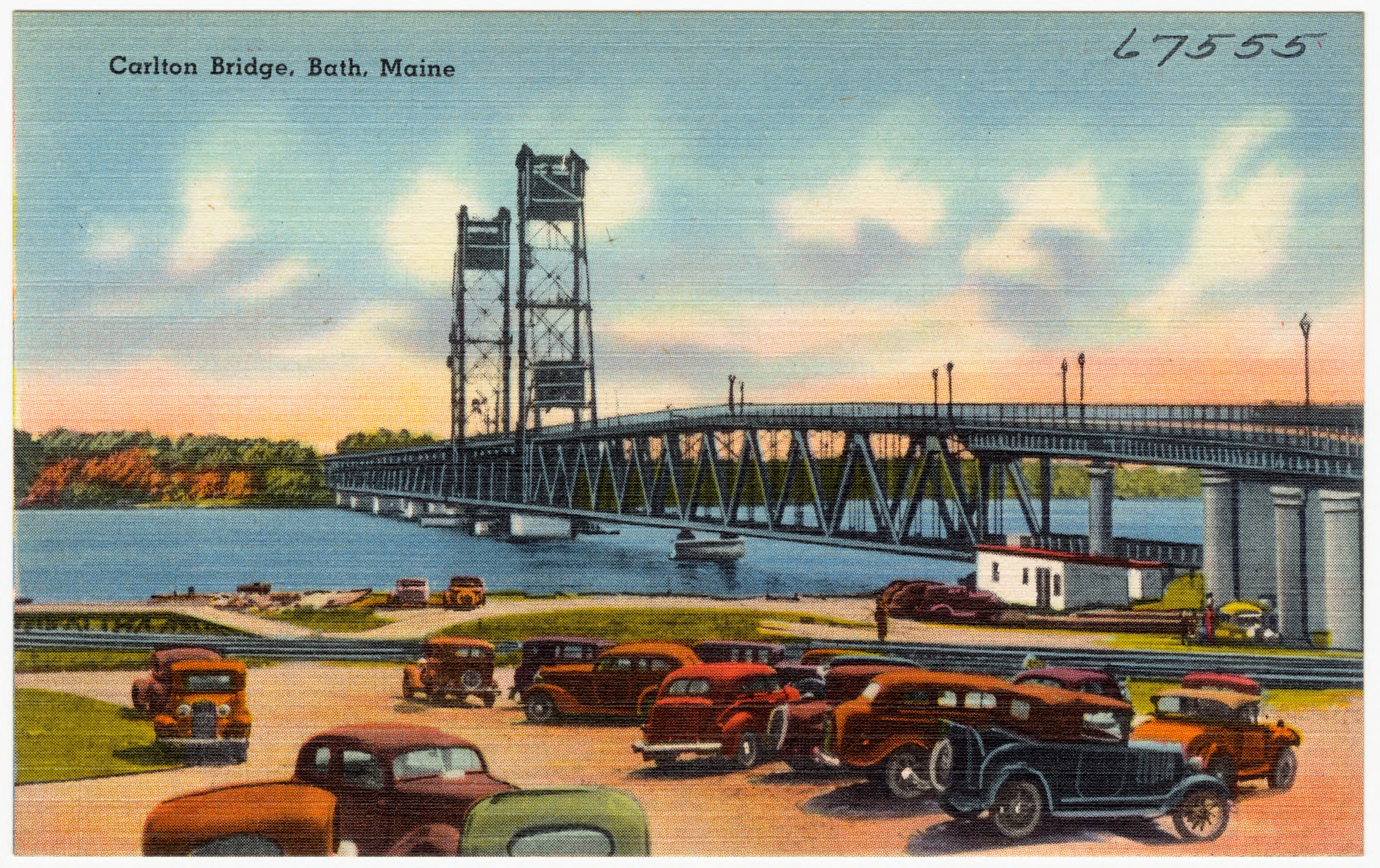
Postcard view c.1930s

The Carlton Bridge is a railroad vertical-lift bridge which carries one rail line over the Kennebec River between Bath and Woolwich, Maine. It was completed in 1927. Until August 1, 2000, it also carried two lanes of U.S. Route 1 (US 1) on its upper deck, after which the highway was transferred to the adjoining Sagadahoc Bridge and the road connection severed at the west end. The east end is gated, and is accessible only by authorized vehicles. The majority of the road deck remains but may be removed in the future. It is the last downstream fixed crossing of the Kennebec.

With the removal of US 1 from the bridge, its primary traffic is freight trains operated by the Cumberland and Knox Railroad which are bound for manufacturers in Thomaston, of which several pass over the bridge per week. It has also carried passenger excursion trains to Rockland, although the Maine Department of Transportation leased the line to another company that meant the end of passenger service after 2015.

== Inspections ==
The 88-year-old bridge failed an inspection in the fall of 2013, resulting in its closure from February 23 to 25, 2014, for an in-depth inspection and load test. The in-depth inspection found that steel has been rusting away from the bridge and at least one beam needs repair. Despite the deficiencies found, MaineDOT has stated that the problems do not currently impair the running of trains across the bridge. No restrictions have been placed on the use of the bridge, though MaineDOT requests that the Maine Eastern Railroad notify it of the days trains pass over the bridge. No decisions have yet been made about how to address the deficiencies, though options include repainting the bridge, removing the remaining road deck, or even its closure.

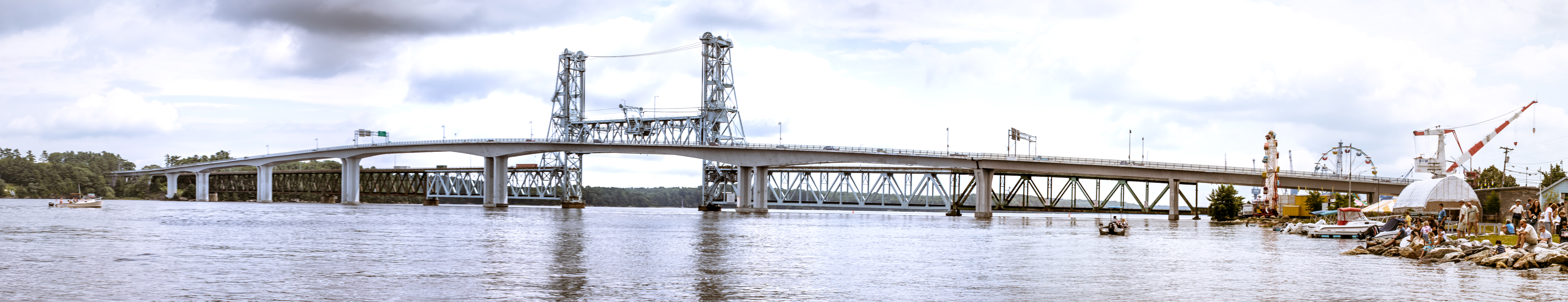
Panoramic view of Sagadahoc Bridge in foreground with Carlton Bridge behind, Bath, Maine, USA 2012
