= Memories (disambiguation) =

Memories refer to information stored, retained, or recalled by an organism.

Memories may also refer to:

== Film and television ==
- Memories, a 1913 film, the first credited appearance of actress Ella Hall
- Memories (1995 film), a 1995 anime anthology film
- Memories (2013 film), a Malayalam film
- Memories (2014 film), a French film
- Memories (2023 film), Indian Tamil-language action thriller film
- "Memories" (The Twilight Zone), a 1988 television episode

== Music ==
- Memories (radio network), or Unforgettable Favorites
- MemoRieS FM, a radio network in the Philippines owned by Primax Broadcasting Network:
  - DYKI in Cebu City
  - DZLL-FM in Baguio City

=== Albums ===
- Memories (Pat Boone album), 1966
- Memories (The Vogues album), 1968
- Memories (Abdullah Ibrahim album), 1973
- Memories (Doc Watson album), 1975
- Memories (Barbra Streisand album), 1981
- Memories: The Best of Elaine Paige, a 1987 compilation album by Elaine Paige
- Memories: The '68 Comeback Special, a 1998 Elvis Presley compilation album
- Memories (mind.in.a.box album), 2015
- Memories...Do Not Open, a 2017 album by The Chainsmokers

=== Songs ===
- "Memories" (1915 song), by Egbert Van Alstyne and Gustave Kahn
- "Memories Are Made of This", Dean Martin, 1955
- "Memories" (Hugh Hopper song), a 1960s song covered by Daevid Allen, Robert Wyatt, Whitney Houston, and others
- "Memories" (Elvis Presley song), 1968
- "The Way We Were" (song), 1973 song by Barbra Streisand, which includes the lyrics "Memories, light the corners of my mind"
- "Memories" (Public Image Ltd song), 1979
- "Memories" (Madness song), 1981
- "Memories" (Harold Faltermeyer song), 1986
- "Memories" (Within Temptation song), 2005
- "Memories" (David Guetta song), 2010
- "Memories" (Vamps song), 2010
- "Memories" (Weezer song), 2010
- "Memories" (Maroon 5 song), 2019
- "Memories" (Riize song), 2023
- "Memories" (LoJay song), 2025
- "Memories", by Morris Albert
- "Memories", by Leonard Cohen from the album Death of a Ladies' Man
- "Memories", by Beverley Craven
- "Memories", by Earth and Fire
- "Memories", by EXID from the album Trouble
- "Memories", by Margaret Glaspy from the 2023 album Echo the Diamond
- "Memories", by Shawn Mendes from the album Handwritten (Revisited)
- "Memories", by Ted Mulry, 1971
- "Memories", by One Ok Rock, 2015
- "Memories", by Panic! At The Disco from the album Vices & Virtues
- "Memories", by Joe Satriani from the album Not of This Earth
- "Memories", by Super Junior from the album Mr. Simple
- "Memories", by The Temptations from the album A Song for You

== See also ==
- Memory (disambiguation)
