= Genetic memory (psychology) =

Memory present at birth that exists in the absence of sensory experience

In psychology, genetic memory (German: Erberinnerung) is a theorized phenomenon in which certain kinds of memories could be inherited, being present at birth in the absence of any associated sensory experience, and that such memories could be incorporated into the genome over long periods.

While theories about the inheritance of specific episodic memories have been thoroughly disproven, some researchers have theorized that more general associations formed by previous generations can pass from generation to generation through the genome. For instance, a study that suggested that mice may be able to inherit an association between certain smells and a neurological response formed by previous generations of mice, does fuel a debate over whether other forms of memory, in this case sensory, can be hereditary. Contemporary theories are based on the idea that the common experiences of a species can become incorporated into that species' genetic code, not by a Lamarckian process that encodes specific memories, but by a much vaguer tendency to encode a readiness to respond in certain ways to certain stimuli.

== Language ==
Language, in the modern view, is considered to be only a partial product of genetic memory. The fact that humans can have languages is a property of the nervous system that is present at birth, and thus phylogenetic. However, perception of the particular set of phonemes specific to a native language only develops during ontogeny. There is no genetic predisposition towards the phonemic makeup of any single language. Children in a particular country are not genetically predisposed to speak the languages of that country, adding further weight to the assertion that genetic memory is not Lamarckian.

== Research ==
Neuroscientific research on mice suggests that some experiences can influence subsequent generations. In a 2013 study, mice trained to fear a specific smell passed on their trained aversion to their descendants, which were then extremely sensitive and fearful of the same smell, even though they had never encountered it, nor been trained to fear it.

Changes in brain structure were also found. The researchers concluded that "the experiences of a parent, even before conceiving, markedly influence both structure and function in the nervous system of subsequent generations".

Scientists have identified genes and similar genetic mechanisms that could be linked with phobias, anxiety, and post-traumatic stress disorders, as well as other neuropsychiatric disorders, in humans.

A 2025 study of Syrian refugees found epigenetic signatures of violence and stress passed through generations, which is the first human evidence of this phenomenon previously documented only in animals.

== Historical views ==
In contrast to the modern view, in the 19th century, biologists considered genetic memory to be a fusion of memory and heredity, and held it to be a Lamarckian mechanism. Ribot, in 1881, for example, held that psychological and genetic memory were based upon a common mechanism, and that the former only differed from the latter in that it interacted with consciousness. Hering and Semon developed general theories of memory, the latter inventing the idea of the engram and concomitant processes of engraphy and ecphory. Semon divided memory into genetic memory and central nervous memory.

This 19th-century view is not wholly dead, albeit that it stands in stark contrast to the ideas of neo-Darwinism. In modern psychology, genetic memory is generally considered a false idea. However, biologists such as Stuart A. Newman and Gerd B. Müller have contributed to the idea in the 21st century.

== In popular culture ==
In Frank Herbert's 1965 novel, Dune, it is explicitly introduced during Paul Atreides's initial test on Caladan. Before the gom jabbar, Reverend Mother Gaius Helen Mohiam explains to Paul the purpose of the Bene Gesserit breeding program. She details their centuries-long quest to create the Kwisatz Haderach—the first male capable of accessing the genetic memories of both his female and male ancestors.

Genetic memory is a major plot device in the video game series Assassin's Creed, where ancestors' memories are hidden in the human genome and can be relived through a virtual reality device called the Animus, to retrieve information of strategic importance in the shadow war between the Assassins and the Templars.

== See also ==
- Adaptive memory
- Collective memory—a sociological concept
- Epigenetics in learning and memory
- Instinct
- Psychological nativism
