= Adaptive memory =

Study of evolving memory systems

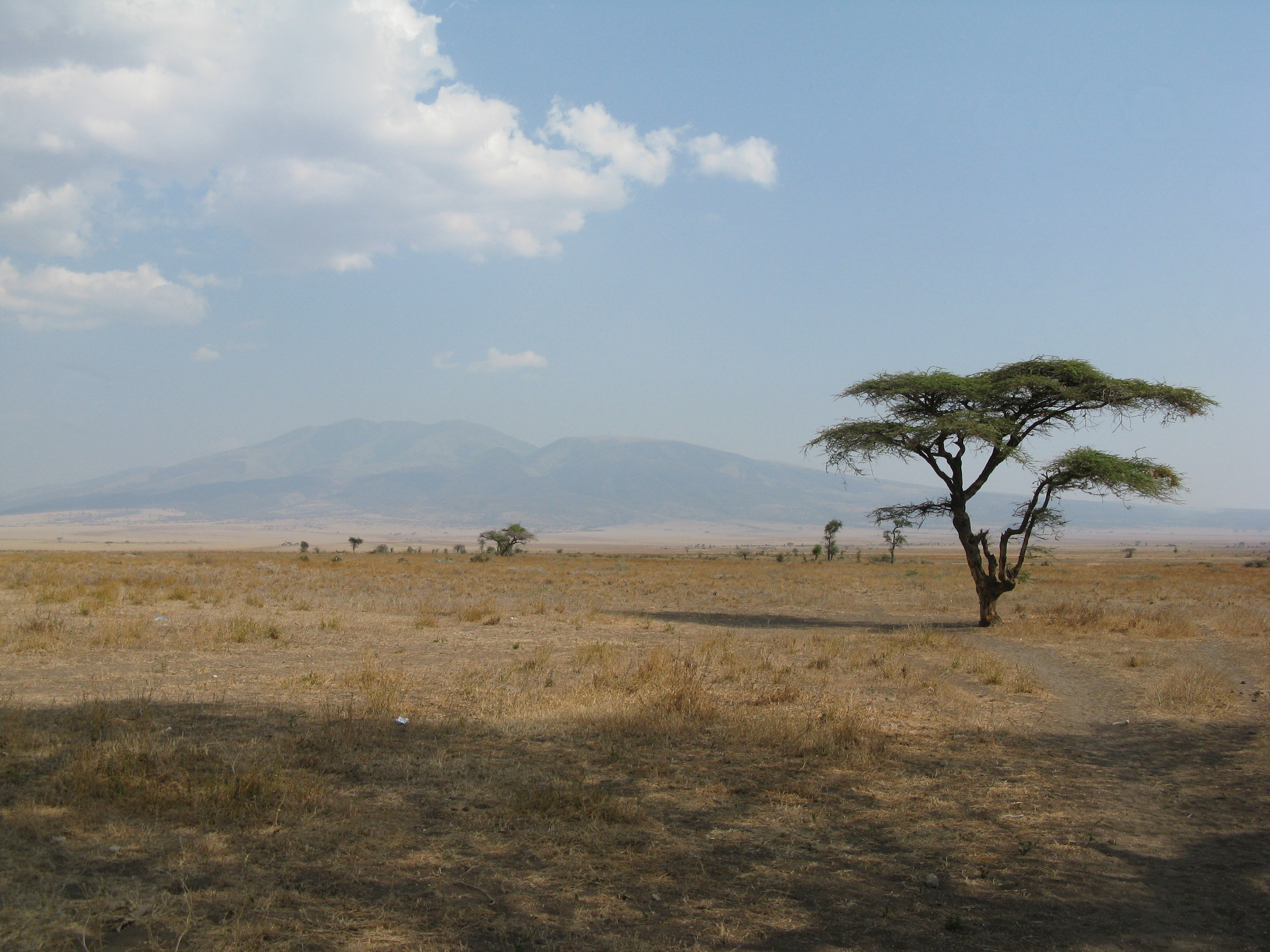
An African grasslands scene, similar to the environment experienced by the evolutionary ancestors of modern humans

Adaptive memory is the study of memory systems that have evolved to help retain survival- and fitness-related information, i.e., that are geared toward helping an organism enhance its reproductive fitness and chances of surviving. One key element of adaptive memory research is the notion that memory evolved to help survival by better retaining information that is fitness-relevant. One of the foundations of this method of studying memory is the relatively little adaptive value of a memory system that evolved merely to remember past events. Memory systems, it is argued, must use the past in some service of the present or the planning of the future. Another assumption under this model is that the evolved memory mechanisms are likely to be domain-specific, or sensitive to certain types of information.

== History of adaptive memory research ==
A recent development in the field of evolutionary psychology, adaptive memory was first proposed in 2007 by James S. Nairne, Sarah R. Thompson, and Josefa N.S. Pandeirada. Evolutionary psychologists often state that humans possess a "stone-age" brain. Therefore, optimal cognitive performance may be found in problems faced by our ancestors, or related to the environments in which our evolutionary ancestors lived. Based on this finding, Nairne and his colleagues proposed that human memory systems are 'tuned' to information relevant to survival.

The first study on the subject of adaptive memory was published in 2007 and its methodology has been replicated many times since. Participants were told to imagine themselves in one of three randomly assigned scenarios. In the Survival condition, they had to imagine being stranded in a grassland area of a foreign land, and needing to find a steady supply of food and water, and protecting themselves from predators. The second condition was the Moving condition. Participants were instructed to imagine themselves moving to a foreign land, needing to locate a new home and transporting their possessions. Finally, the Pleasantness condition asked participants to simply rate the pleasantness of a list of words. In the Survival and Moving conditions, participants were asked to rate the relevance of each word on a list to their imagined situation. Participants were then subject to a surprise recall test. Nairne et al. found what they called the survival advantage.

The survival advantage means that information that is more salient, or relevant, to survival in an ancestral environment has a higher rate of retention than control conditions. This became clear following free recall experiments conducted by Nairne and colleagues. Processing information relevant to survival leads to more information being remembered than most known encoding techniques. One explanation for the survival advantage's improved retention is that this kind of processing taps into a sort of memory 'module' specialized for remembering and processing information that is important for survival. Another proposed explanation is that it leads to more arousal and emotional processing. Because many survival situations are emotionally arousing, retention is enhanced.

== Studying survival-based processing ==
=== Methodology ===
An important first step toward a functional analysis of survival processing is thinking about the kinds of problems memory would have evolved to solve. Figuring out selection pressures can be difficult. Post-hoc accounts, also known as just-so stories, are an important problem to avoid. Nairne et al.'s work stressed the importance of a priori predictions, and designing empirical tests. Like other scientific research, a very important element of studying adaptive memory is to consider its basis on empirical evidence and study methodology.

The methodology for testing adaptive memory and the survival advantage in human participants has thus far mostly consisted of ranking lists of words by their relevance to a survival setting (and along control dimensions as well), followed by a recall session. The basic research methodology involves having participants rate a series of words by their fitness relevance. In the control condition, the words were rated for their relevance to moving for a foreign land, and their pleasantness. A surprise recall test is administered, and recall of the listed words in all three conditions is recorded and analyzed.

=== Findings ===
==== General findings ====
One major finding is that survival processing has been shown to yield better retention than imagery, self-reference and pleasantness, which are all considered to be among the best conditions for remembering learned information. Otgaar, Smeets and van Bergen hypothesized that since visual processing developed earlier than language, there ought to be a survival advantage for images as well as words, and they found such an advantage. Grasslands survival scenarios showed higher retention than near-identical scenarios in which the word 'grasslands' was replaced with 'city' and the word 'predators' replaced with 'attackers'. It is suspected that this result is due to the human mind being attuned to scenarios relevant to our species' ancestral past, even though threats present in a modern urban society are far more relevant today. There was a greater memory recall in both the ancestral and modern survival conditions when compared to pleasantness control conditions, but only the ancestral condition presented significantly greater word recall. Both conditions are fitness-relevant, but there was no memory enhancement for survival processing in the modern context. Additionally, as females typically performed gathering tasks over the span of human evolution, and males performed hunting tasks, research into this gender dichotomy was conducted. No significant data were found. The implications of this research lie in helping to understand how the mind evolved and how it works. The idea that we are able to retain information most relevant to our own survival provides a foundation of research for empirical studying of memory through an evolutionary lens. Understanding the circumstances when memory is at its best can help with the study of the functions of memory as a whole, and help understand what memory is capable of.

==== True and false memory ====
The survival processing advantage has been shown to increase both true and false memory in adults and children. True memory refers to the correct retention of information. False memory means remembering something that was never present. A false memory is not necessarily maladaptive. Misremembering can have advantages in certain situations (for example, misremembering an environment with predator tracks as the actual presence of a predator may lead to avoidance of that area in the future). False memory can be seen as a side-effect to an otherwise highly adaptive process.

==== Planning future acts ====
One of the most important functions of memory is the ability to use learned information to make predictions in future planning. Adaptive memory states that memory was created and developed by the process of natural selection, so many components of memory systems were important for long-term planning, the importance of which is central to ensuring survival and the passing of genes.

==== Gathering-related navigation ====
There exists evidence that the human memory system has evolved to be equipped with a gathering-related navigation system, helping remember the location of gatherable food sources in spatial memory. This was suggested in a recent study that tested spatial memory for various food items, with additional predictions later extended and validated. In the first study, both males and females were shown to have better spatial memory for more caloric foods at a farmer's market than foods with a lower calorie content. It has been suggested that calorie-dense foods are an important resource to be able to gather in an ancestral environment, and the inability to locate this kind of food would put an organism at a disadvantage.

== Neurobiological basis ==
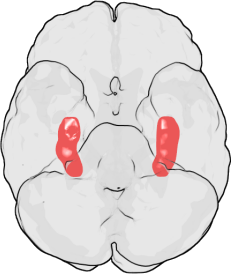
Location of the hippocampus in the brain, an important structure in the function of memory

Although there has not been any research done on the direct neurological processes that go on during an adaptive memory consolidation, there is a growing body of evidence that the neurotransmitter dopamine modulates the hippocampus, a cortical structure (brain structure) crucial to memory. The release of dopamine has been known to be associated with events of a motivationally important nature, and has a role in the creation of episodic memories and the consolidation thereof. Episodic memories are crucial in the development and implementation of adaptive future behaviours, for which adaptive memory is a very central construct. Functional imaging research conducted during an adaptive memory experiment might be able to provide some insight into the exact brain activity responsible for the phenomenon.

== Proximate mechanisms responsible for survival processing ==
It has been suggested that the recall advantage for survival processing can be attributed to the use of both item-specific processing (the encoding of individual characteristics of items) and relational processing (encoding the relationships between items). It was found that the survival advantage was present when words were encoded using only item-specific or only relational processing, but was eliminated in cases where both methods of encoding were encouraged. Employing both item-specific and relational processing simultaneously makes survival processing unique; the only other phenomenon that also activates both item-specific and relational is self-referential processing. Self-referential processing is one of the proposed explanations for the survival recall advantage. Evidence suggests that it is possible that the survival task might generate self-referential processing, which may be responsible for the reported recall improvements, since considering one's own survival is very self-relevant.

== Evolutionary adaptations of memory in non-human species ==
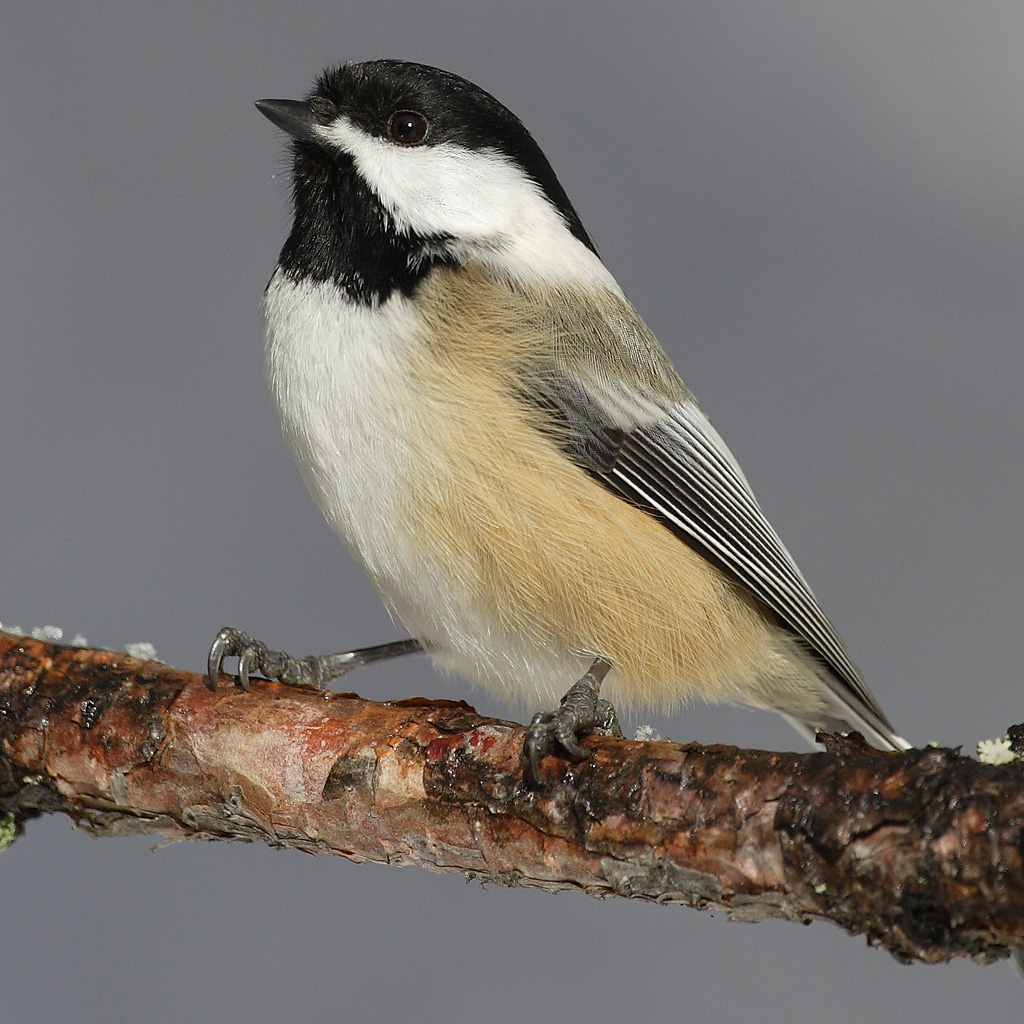
Black-capped chickadees (Poecile atricapilla) from Alaska showed stronger recall of the locations of cached food than did those from Colorado.

Adaptive memory behaviours have been observed in animal species, as well as humans. John Garcia discovered that taste aversion conditioning in rats results in a lasting association between sickness and an ingested substance, and that aversion can be established after only one trial. This rapid learning led others to the idea that rats have biological dispositions for learning to associate sickness with a taste memory as a result of its evolutionary history. The results of a study that compared rats and quail in the acquisition of taste aversion suggested that rats rely on their memory of taste to avoid nausea while quail relied on their visual memory. Since the rat is a nocturnal feeder and has poor vision, it was suggested that they rely on taste cues to learn to avoid toxic substances, leading to a highly developed chemical sense system.

In a study of black-capped chickadees (Poecile atricapilla) from Alaska and Colorado, those birds from Alaska cached more food, remembered the hiding places more quickly and readily, and had significantly larger hippocampal volumes than black-capped chickadees from Colorado. This supports what is known as the adaptive specialization hypothesis. The adaptive specialization hypothesis states that animals that hide food should have bigger hippocampi than animals that do not hide food. Additionally, those animals that hide food performed better than non-hiding animals on spatial memory tests. This finding suggests that since the climate tends to be harsh in Alaska, there may be an increased need to remember where food is hidden, to help them survive through the winter.

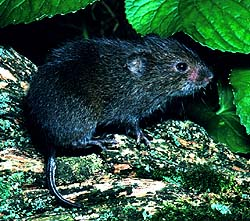
Polygamous meadow voles have shown to perform better in route and place learning tasks than the monogamous pine vole, likely attributable to their nomadic nature.

Under the pressure of natural selection, sex differences in spatial memory skills can develop under distinct mating systems. Comparing different vole species that are either polygamous or monogamous, researchers found that sex differences in spatial skills are only found in the polygamous mating meadow vole. Further examination found that unlike monogamous pine voles (who travel together on a permanent basis with their partners), polygamous males have increased mobility (compared to the females) in order to reap reproductive benefits. Male meadow voles with good spatial skills are more likely to be able to survive and reproduce. It is suggested that such evolutionary pressure led to greater spatial skills in comparison to female meadow voles and monogamous male pine voles. This suggestion is based on better performance by male meadow voles on route and place learning tasks in laboratory tests. Polygamous voles have a significantly larger relative hippocampus than females of the same species, and no such difference was found between the pine vole sexes. These findings suggest that when better spatial memory is more evolutionarily adaptive, as in polygamous species, these organisms may develop a larger hippocampus, to allow greater spatial memory.

== Alternative viewpoints/explanations ==
=== Congruity effect ===
In contrast to Nairne's findings of a survival advantage, it has been found that the superiority of survival processing can be explained by a congruity effect. The congruity effect means that people tend to be better at remembering items if they are congruent with the way they are processed. Congruence between the processing task and target words leads to deeper and more elaborate encoding, which is thought to explain the survival advantage. Butler and colleagues conducted three experiments to test this view; the first replicated Nairne's work and confirmed a survival recall advantage. The second and third experiments controlled for the congruity effect, which was thought to be an underlying explanation for such a memory advantage. A survival scenario along with a robbery scenario were used to rate words instead of the original survival, moving or pleasantness categories. Butler found that, when the materials are controlled for with respect to congruence between type of processing (survival vs robbery scenario) and nature of materials (word lists), survival processing does not always produce superior recall; survival processing did not produce a recall advantage within the congruent conditions where congruity was controlled for.

=== False memory illusions and net accuracy ===
It has been proposed that survival processing and recall of survival-relevant materials increases both true and false memory recall. Howe and Derbish suggested that if human memory does benefit from survival processing, this benefit must include both an increase in true recollection of information actually present and also a reduced susceptibility to false memory illusions. Further, Howe and Derbish state, if survival information is more distinctive and processed at an item-specific contextual level, false memory rates should be low. To test this, Nairne's survival/pleasantness experiment was modified to manipulate the type of processing along with the information being processed (eliminated the possibility of recollection of survival-related material due to arousal or emotionality; neutral, negative or survival related). It was concluded that participants in the survival condition had higher rates of false recognition than participants in the pleasantness condition. Evidence for a survival recall advantage has been found to be accompanied by higher false recall rates and results in lower rates of net accuracy (ratio of true recall to recall as a whole). The survival recall advantage appears to occur when only true recall is considered. When total output is taken into account and net accuracy is calculated, the survival recall advantage disappears.

=== Basic memory processes ===
Basic memory processes have also been examined in terms of their relation to survival processing, in hopes of explaining the survival recall advantage. Weinstein, Bugg and Roediger contrasted two basic memory processes: schematic processing (the memory performance is made easier and more efficient with the creation of schemas) and self-referential processing (elaboration becomes easier when relating the concept to oneself). Weinstein and colleagues conducted two experiments, the first duplicating Nairne's findings, and the second comparing the survival advantage to schematic and self-referential processing. Weinstein's findings supported Nairne's survival advantage and found it unlikely that the survival advantage can be explained in terms of schematic processing or self-reference.

=== Falsified assumptions ===
Adaptive memory research depends on different auxiliary assumptions drawn from evolutionary psychology. One assumption is that memory will be specially tuned to remember information that is processed in a context similar to the environmental context where the adaptation took place, i.e., the African savannah or "grasslands of a foreign land". However, information that was processed for its relevance to an environment involving zombies was remembered better than information processed under the African savannah context and the African context condition did not differ from outer space processing. These experiments present a problem for the assumption of the importance of the ancestral environment because retention was better for information processed under a non-African savannah context, something not predicted by the theory of adaptive memory.

A second assumption of adaptive memory research is that memory evolved because it was beneficial for survival, thus, based on a functional approach, memory should be more sensitive and retention better for information that is processed for its fitness-relevance. The assumption of fitness-relevance has been experimentally evaluated using a number of specific evolutionarily relevant scenarios designed to tap different adaptive mechanisms (or psychological adaptations), for example, a mating mechanism, fear and phobia mechanism, cheater detection mechanism, etc. When words were processed with respect to these different adaptive mechanisms, there was not a processing benefit for these scenarios. This finding suggests that fitness-relevance is too amorphous of a construct to explain the mnemonic benefit found with survival processing and Sandry et al. suggest that research efforts should be directed at identifying the underlying mechanisms and developing a taxonomy of adaptive memory, similar to evolutionary biology.

== Extensions of adaptive memory ==
In addition to survival-based processing, Seitz, Polack and Miller (2020) investigated whether memory advantages also apply in parental care contexts. The authors found that rating items in terms of their relevance to parental care improves recall, a phenomenon that was termed the parent processing effect. Additionally, they tested whether recall benefits differ when the hypothetical care-receiver is biologically related as opposed to being unrelated. The results were mixed, the influence of biological relatedness on recall was modest, which suggests that memory enhancements in the context of caring may not be strictly tied to those who are biologically related.

=== The parent processing effect and biological relatedness ===
The parent processing effect refers to the mnemonic advantage that participants have when they evaluate neutral stimuli (e.g. words) in terms of their relevance to the survival or wellbeing of a child (often imagined), rather than for themselves. Several studies have shown that in this "offspring-oriented" context, recall is enhanced.

Seitz et al. (2020) furthered this by explicitly testing whether memory advantages under parent processing depend on the assumed biological relatedness of the child (e.g. biological vs. adopted). This idea was tested across four different experiments and found that slightly changing the description of relatedness to the imagined child has an impact on recall ability. The experiments found that items encoded with respect to a biological child were remembered better than those that were encoded with respect to an adopted child.

Additional scenarios where participants were tasked with imagining someone else's child as opposed to their own were also tested. These scenarios found that the biological versus adoption distinction still had an effect, however it was usually smaller.

Overall, the results suggest that the effect of parent processing is not uniform, its strength depends on assumed kinship. This supports the idea that mnemonic mechanisms may be sensitive not only to child survivial, but also to degree of genetic closeness.

== Future research ==
As the concept of adaptive memory is a relatively recent development in memory research, there is still much research to be done in this field. One important consideration for further research in this field is adopting of a functional perspective of memory, leading to the important goal of further empirical findings and the refinement of those results obtained thus far. Another important research goal is identifying the precise conditions under which the survival advantage is in effect and those under which it is not. A third critical research focus is determining the specific functional mechanism or mechanisms responsible for this effect. Future research should be conducted with a wide variety of items such as pictures, categorized lists, and content specific materials (for example, those related to food, reproduction, predators and other survival-relevant domains). Finally, neuroimaging research has yet to be done to address any neurological activity that may be different in adaptive memory processing compared to normal conditions. Further research into adaptive memory would be very helpful in understanding more about how exactly the brain works in a survival situation.

== See also ==
- Genetic memory (psychology)
