= In Memoriam (photograph) =

Photograph by Edward Steichen

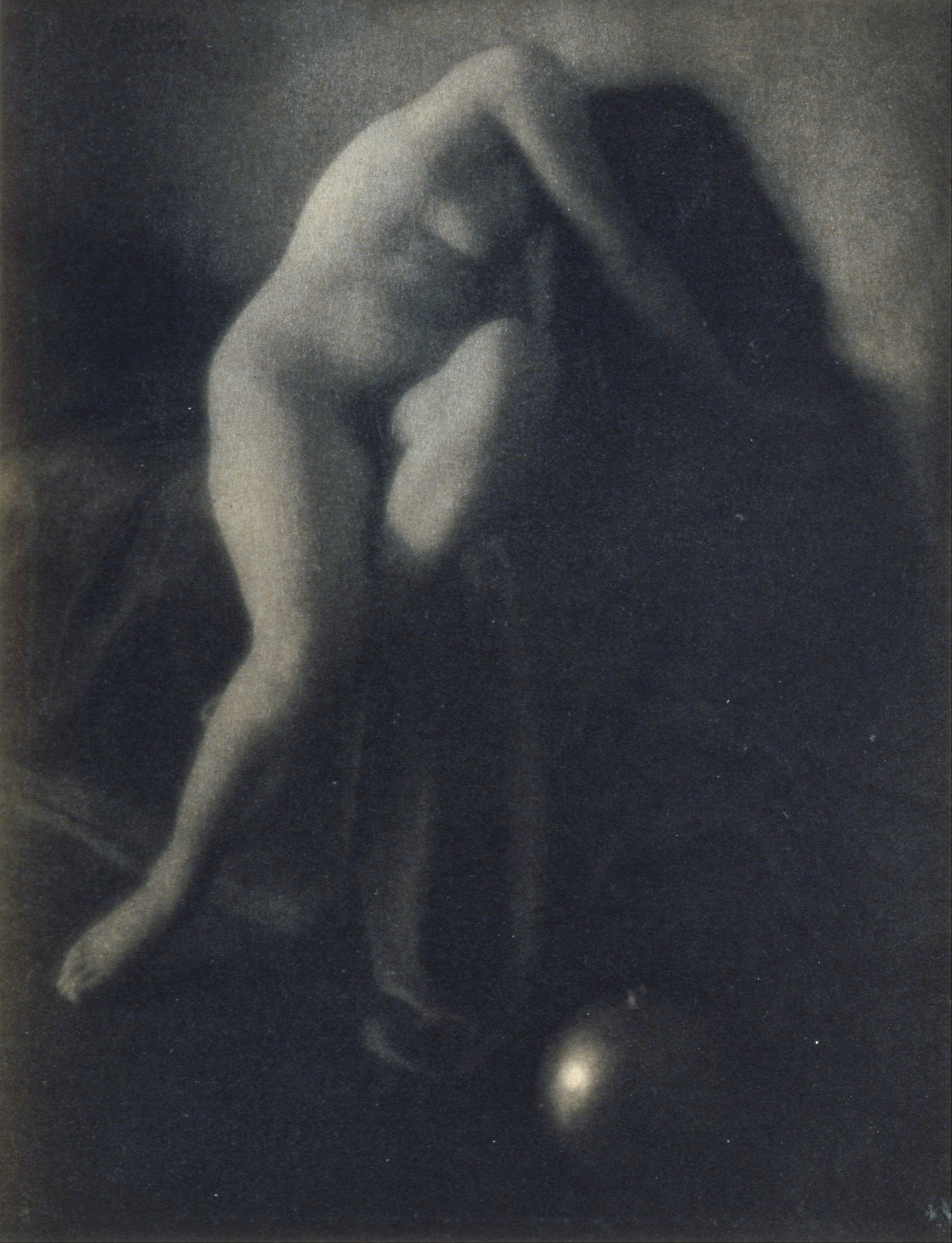
In Memoriam (1904) by Edward Steichen

In Memoriam is a black-and-white photograph by American photographer Edward Steichen, from 1904. It is one of his best-known pictorialist works and is a nude portrayal of a deceased female model, hence its title.

== History and description ==
Steichen visited Paris in 1900 and 1901, where he knew the French artistic contemporary tendencies in painting and sculpture. When he returned to the United States in 1902 he joined Alfred Stieglitz's Photo-Secession movement, the main purpose of which was the recognition of photography as an art form. Steichen produced the current photograph while in Paris, in 1900 or in 1901, but it was only printed in 1904. It depicts a nude female model. She is believed to have committed suicide because of her unrequited love for Steichen. The naked woman is seated, inclined to her right, with her face not visible, and one of her arms in front of her long dark hair. An enigmatic, circular object, lies at her feet. The blurred enigmatic, erotic and poetic figure shows the influence of symbolism and possibly also the sculptural work of Auguste Rodin.

The picture focuses more on her naked flesh while hiding her face. The Musée d'Orsay website states that: "As in many pictorial photographs, this nude is blurred, enhancing the impression of mystery introduced by the studied pose of the model with her face hidden. The way the figure occupies the space is typical of Steichen's compositional skills. In spite of the abstract nature of the image, emphasised by the chiaroscuro throughout the photograph, we can feel the physical weight of the woman's body, which is somewhat unusual in Steichen's nudes who are usually more ethereal."

== Art market ==
A print of the photograph sold by $665,000 at Christie's New York City, on 18 February 2016.

== Public collections ==
There are prints of the photograph at the Museum of Modern Art, in New York City, the Metropolitan Museum of Art, in New York City, the Philadelphia Museum of Art, the Denver Art Museum, and at the Musée d'Orsay, in Paris.
