= Calumet Bridge at Old Fort Western =

Coordinates: 44.3168°N 69.7723°W

The Calumet Bridge at Old Fort Western is a bridge in Augusta, Maine, over the Kennebec River. It carries Cony Street from Downtown Augusta on the west side of the river to the east side near Old Fort Western.

From its construction in 1973 until 2009, the bridge was known as the Father Curran Bridge, named by the Maine Legislature for the Rev. John J. Curran, a Catholic priest at St. Augustine Church in Augusta from 1962 to 1972. Long after his death in 1976, allegations of sexual abuse arose, which motivated the legislature to vote to remove his name from the bridge in 2009. The legislation to do so, sponsored by Rep. Patsy Crockett and signed by Gov. John Baldacci, gave the bridge its current name. The word calumet refers to a "peace pipe".
