= In Memoriam: President Garfield's Funeral March =

1881 funeral march by John Philip Sousa

- by John Philip Sousa
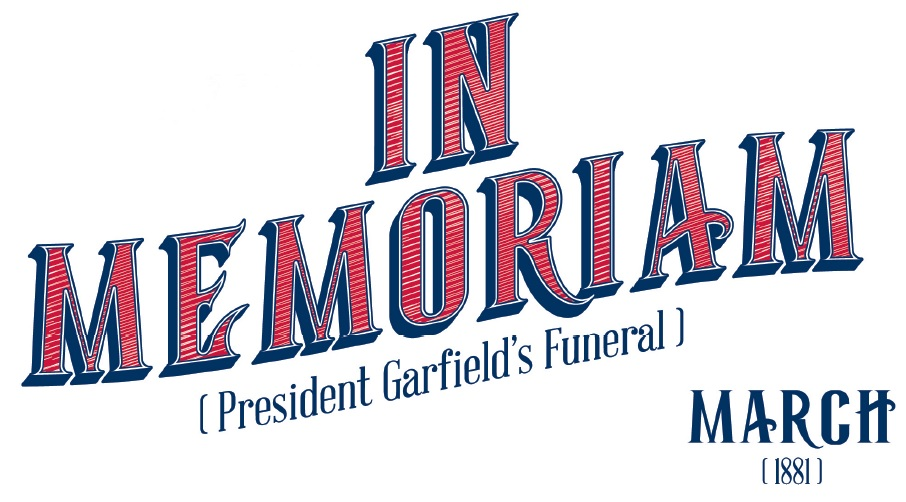
- Portion of title page of the 2016 publication of "In Memoriam"
- Opus: 132
- Genre: Dirge
- Occasion: State funeral of James Garfield
- Composed: 1881

Premiere
- Performers: "The President's Own" United States Marine Band

Audio sample
- 2015 performance by the United States Marine Band: file; help

"In Memoriam: President Garfield's Funeral March" is a funeral dirge composed by John Philip Sousa in 1881, while serving as director of "the President's Own" United States Marine Band, for the state funeral of President of the United States James Garfield. It was debuted during the committal of Garfield's remains and, 51 years later, was performed at Sousa's own funeral by the Marine Band. It is one of only two compositions Sousa dedicated to an American president, the other one being "President Garfield's Inauguration", also written for Garfield for his inauguration.

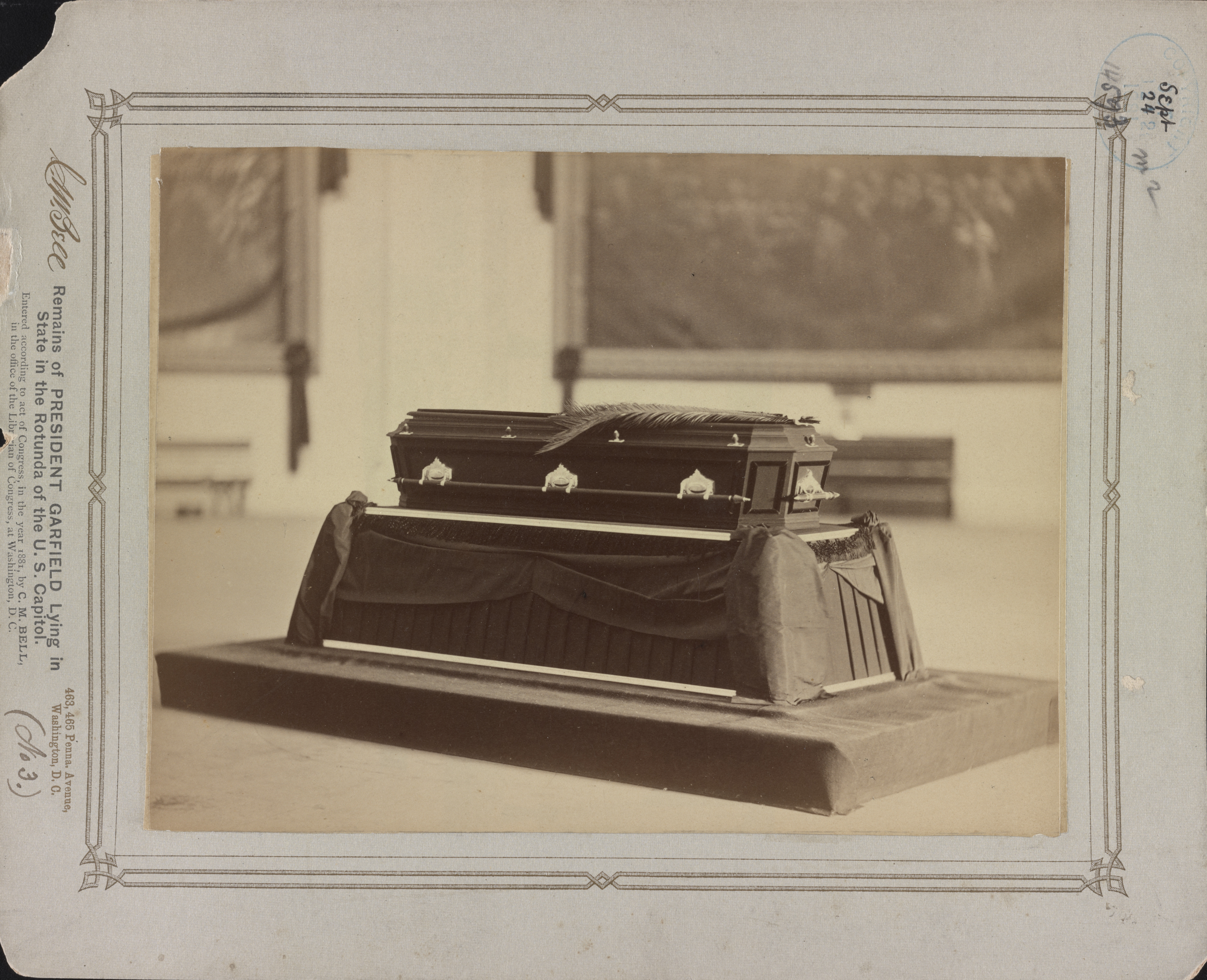
Garfield's coffin in the United States Capitol rotunda

== Background ==
On July 2, 1881 at the Baltimore and Potomac Railroad Station in Washington, D.C., President of the United States James Garfield was shot at close range by Charles J. Guiteau who, upon being apprehended by police, yelled, "Arthur is now President"! Garfield, then the third youngest president in American history, died 79 days later in Elberon, New Jersey where he had been taken to recover. The announcement of Garfield's death came as a surprise to the public as news accounts prior to that point had reported he had been recovering satisfactorily.

Both John Philip Sousa and Garfield were members of the same Masonic lodge. While reclining in bed, Sousa heard newspaperboys shouting the news of Garfield's death. Shocked, he left his bed and went for a long walk through Washington. By the next morning he had composed the melody for what would be called "In Memoriam: President Garfield's Funeral March". On returning home, he committed it to paper. "In Memoriam" was one of only two compositions Sousa dedicated to American presidents, the other was "President Garfield's Inauguration March", composed earlier in the year 1881 for the occasion of Garfield's inauguration.

== Performances ==
"In Memoriam" was performed by "the President's Own" United States Marine Band, under Sousa's direction, as Garfield's body arrived in Washington for the lying in state. The Marine Band's first trip outside of Washington, under Sousa, occurred the following week when it traveled to Cleveland, Ohio for the funeral where the dirge was again performed during funeral rites.

Fifty-one years later, "In Memoriam" was performed for Sousa's own funeral by the Marine Band as his remains were escorted to the Congressional Cemetery for interment.

== See also ==
- Assassination of James A. Garfield
- Funeral Sentences and Music for the Funeral of Queen Mary
- James A. Garfield Memorial
