= Memorial Union =

Memorial Union may refer to:

- Coffman Memorial Union at the University of Minnesota-Twin Cities in Minneapolis, Minnesota
- Memorial Union (Oregon State University) at Oregon State University in Corvallis, Oregon
- Memorial Union (University of Missouri) at University of Missouri in Columbia, Missouri
- Indiana Memorial Union at Indiana University in Bloomington, Indiana
- Memorial Union (Iowa State University) at Iowa State University in Ames, Iowa
- Iowa Memorial Union at University of Iowa in Iowa City, Iowa
- Memorial Union (University of Oklahoma) at University of Oklahoma in Norman, Oklahoma
- Memorial Union (University of Wisconsin–Madison) at the University of Wisconsin–Madison in Madison, Wisconsin
- Purdue Memorial Union at Purdue University in West Lafayette, Indiana
- Memorial Union at University of California, Davis in Davis, California
- Memorial Union at the University of North Dakota in Grand Forks, North Dakota
- Emporia State University Memorial Union at Emporia State University in Emporia, Kansas
- Memorial Union at Arizona State University in Tempe, Arizona

== See also ==
- Memorial Union Building (disambiguation)
