= Memorial Union Building (MTU) =

Coordinates: 47.1188°N 88.5492°W

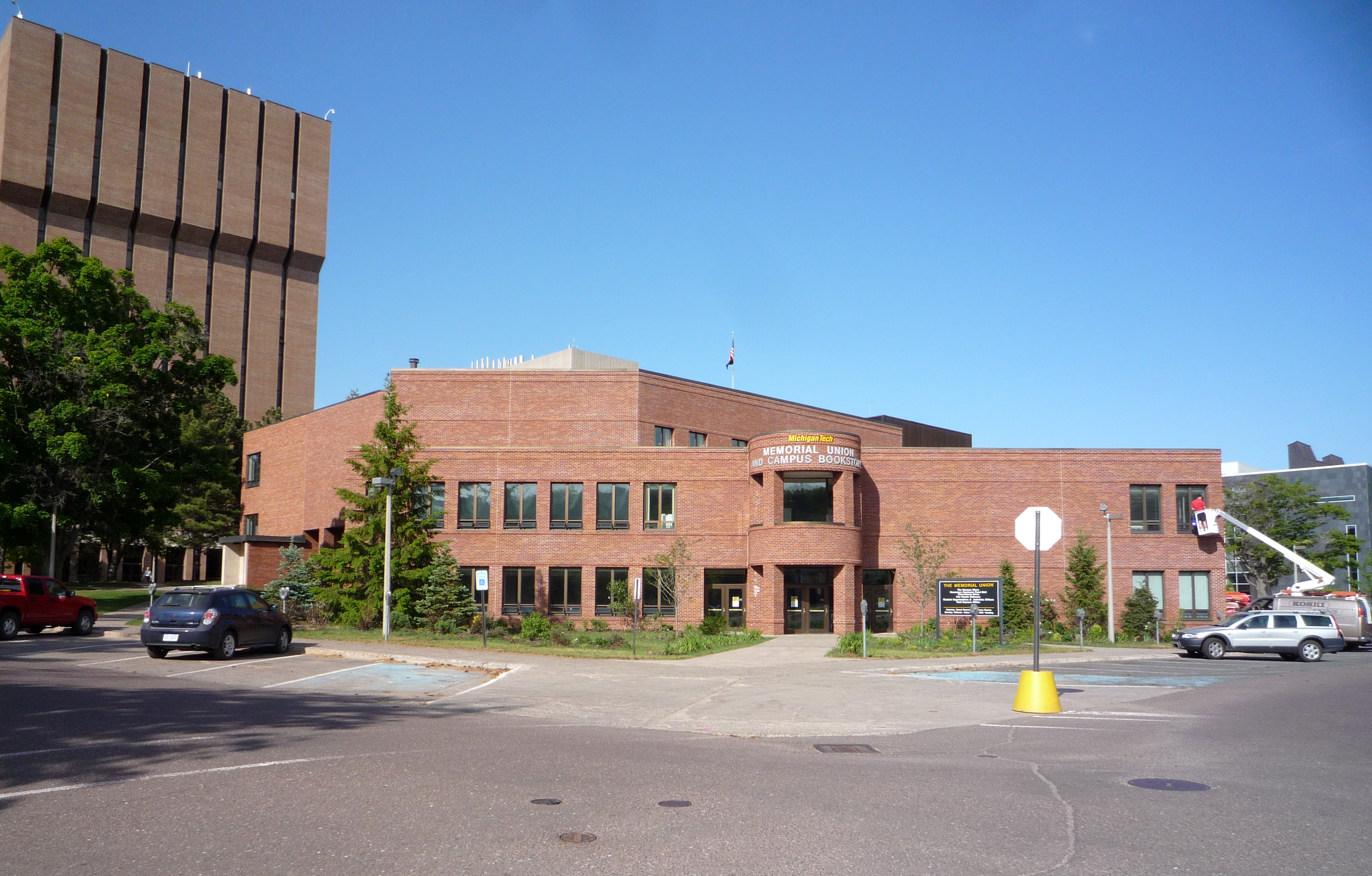
Memorial Union Building in 2009

The Memorial Union Building (MUB) is a multipurpose building located on the campus of Michigan Tech. It was completed in 1952. Originally constructed to facilitate the needs of 1,169 students, the MUB was renovated in 1987 to accommodate a large increase in enrollment. The building is used for many things, including as a lounge, cafeteria, dining area, bookstore, and contains conference rooms, student organization offices, and game rooms.

== Background ==
Michigan Tech alumni, who felt that inadequate social facilities existed on campus, suggested the construction of MUB. The school's alumni association initiated a national fundraiser, which raised $300,000 towards the construction of a new social activities facility. The funds were augmented with bonds and loans to meet construction costs.

Some alumni refused support, voicing objections that the construction was a "foolhardy" proposition, especially considering the costs involved. Others, feeling that the state should pay for such buildings, also refused their support, whether monetary or otherwise. Nevertheless, the project went forward, and upon completion the alumni association dubbed it the Memorial Union Building as a tribute to those who served in the armed forces from Michigan Tech. The "Union" component was also intended to unite the campus through the social activities contained therein.
