= Maine Kennebec Bridge =

Coordinates: 44.0909°N 69.7825°W

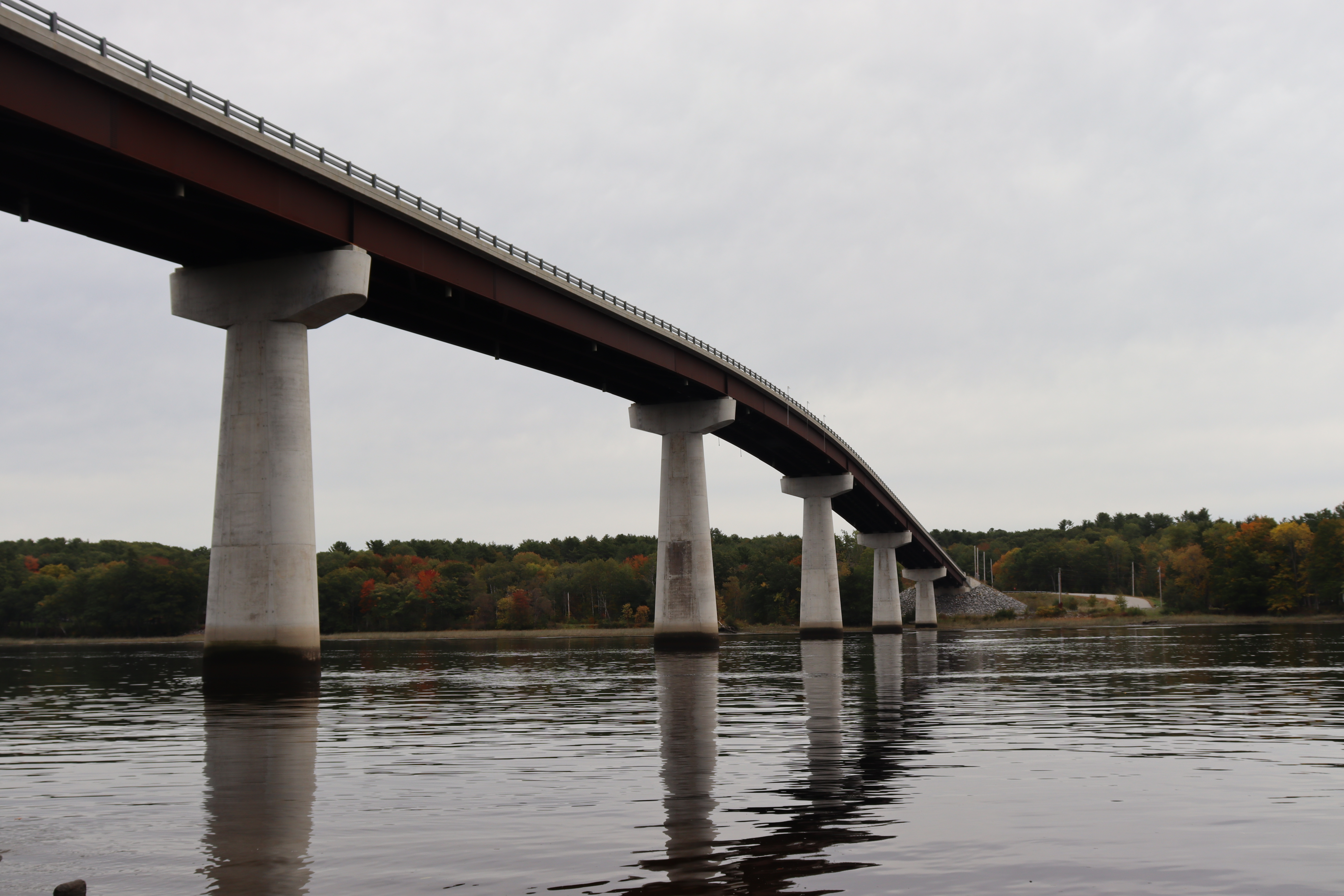
Maine Kennebec Bridge

The Maine Kennebec Bridge is a bridge that crosses the Kennebec River between Richmond and Dresden, Maine. It was built in 2014 to replace the 84-year-old Richmond-Dresden Bridge, a swing bridge that had previously acted as the only method of crossing the river in that area. The Maine Kennebec Bridge is significantly taller than the old bridge, and was designed for at least 75 feet (23 meters) of clearance during high tide, allowing boats to pass without the need for a swing-span design.
