= In Memoriam (Small Faces album) =

Compilation album by Small Faces
- Released: 1 May 1969
- Recorded: 21 October 1967 – 18 November 1968
- Venue: Newcastle City Hall, Newcastle upon Tyne
- Studio: Olympic & Trident, London
- Length: 35:12
- Label: Immediate
- Producer: Small Faces

Small Faces chronology
Ogdens' Nut Gone Flake (1968)	In Memoriam (1969)	The Autumn Stone (1969)

In Memoriam is a compilation album of songs by the English rock band Small Faces, released after the announcement of their break-up in early 1969. It was released on 1 May 1969 through Immediate Records in West Germany only. Their second compilation album following 1967's From the Beginning, In Memoriam is a collection of live cuts and unreleased studio tracks. The studio material was recorded during 1967 and the 1968 sessions for Ogdens' Nut Gone Flake, and also included a few tracks possibly intended for their projected but unrealised fourth album 1862. The studio outtakes were complemented by five live tracks recorded on tour in November 1968 (aside from uncredited session work for French pop star Johnny Hallyday in December 1968, these live tracks proved to be the Small Faces final recordings under the group name, and after a final brief tour of Europe in January 1969 the band dissolved).

Former band members objected to the request for an English release of the album, and the tracks remained officially unreleased there for another six months until they were finally repackaged along with various other singles, album tracks and B-sides on Immediate's first double album The Autumn Stone on 14 November 1969.

== Background ==
By mid-1968, the Small Faces had begun to fall apart despite their popular success in the UK. "Lazy Sunday", which was released by Immediate records without the band's knowledge or consent, had reached number 2 in the UK Singles Chart, and according to drummer Kenney Jones this was considered a "nail in the coffin" for the band by lead vocalist and guitarist Steve Marriott. Marriott was by this point eager to distance himself from the band's frivolous image and his own acquired label of 'pop idol' which he had grown to detest, and to be seen as a more serious musician.

Marriott's own choice of follow-up to "Lazy Sunday" was "The Universal", which was largely recorded on a portable tape recorder in Marriott's backyard. Small Faces keyboardist Ian McLagan did not play on the recording, as he had lately become exhausted by Marriott's mercurial creative temperament. "The Universal" reached number 16 on the UK chart.

Marriott had considered "The Universal" the best song he had written so far, and he was crushed by its lukewarm reception. However, the band had also recently released their third studio album Ogdens' Nut Gone Flake to both critical and commercial acclaim (it reached number 1 in the UK, staying on top of the charts for six weeks). As a consequence of enduring such opposing fortunes in such quick succession, Marriott suffered a crisis of confidence and developed writer's block which left him unable to compose music completely for a while afterward.

Despite the immense success of the "Ogdens" album, by July 1968 the Small Faces seemed at a sudden loss to consolidate that success, and Marriott's crisis of confidence saw him begin to drift apart from his bandmates. By September, he wanted to invite guitarist Peter Frampton, a fellow disaffected teen heart-throb, into the band's lineup in order to beef up the band's sound and allow him to focus more on his singing. Although Frampton made some guest appearances at a few Small Faces concerts in October, much to Marriott's dismay, his permanent addition to the band was vehemently opposed by Bassist and co-writer Ronnie Lane and Ian McLagan. As a result Marriott now began to grow sour on the group's future prospects.

In early December, at the behest of their regular producer/engineer Glyn Johns, the Small Faces-with Frampton in tow-journeyed to France to perform as a five-piece backing band for the sessions for a new Johnny Hallyday album. Discord between bandmates grew during the trip, and the division between them only widened as Lane and McLagan resisted what they must have considered, rightly or wrongly, as Marriott's attempt to force them to accept Frampton permanently into the group. Tensions finally came to a head on 31 December 1968 at a Small Faces performance at the Alexandra Palace where Marriott stormed off stage during (perhaps tellingly) set-closer Lazy Sunday, yelling "I Quit!", leaving his bandmates and guest performer Alexis Korner to conclude the show as best they could.

== Recording ==
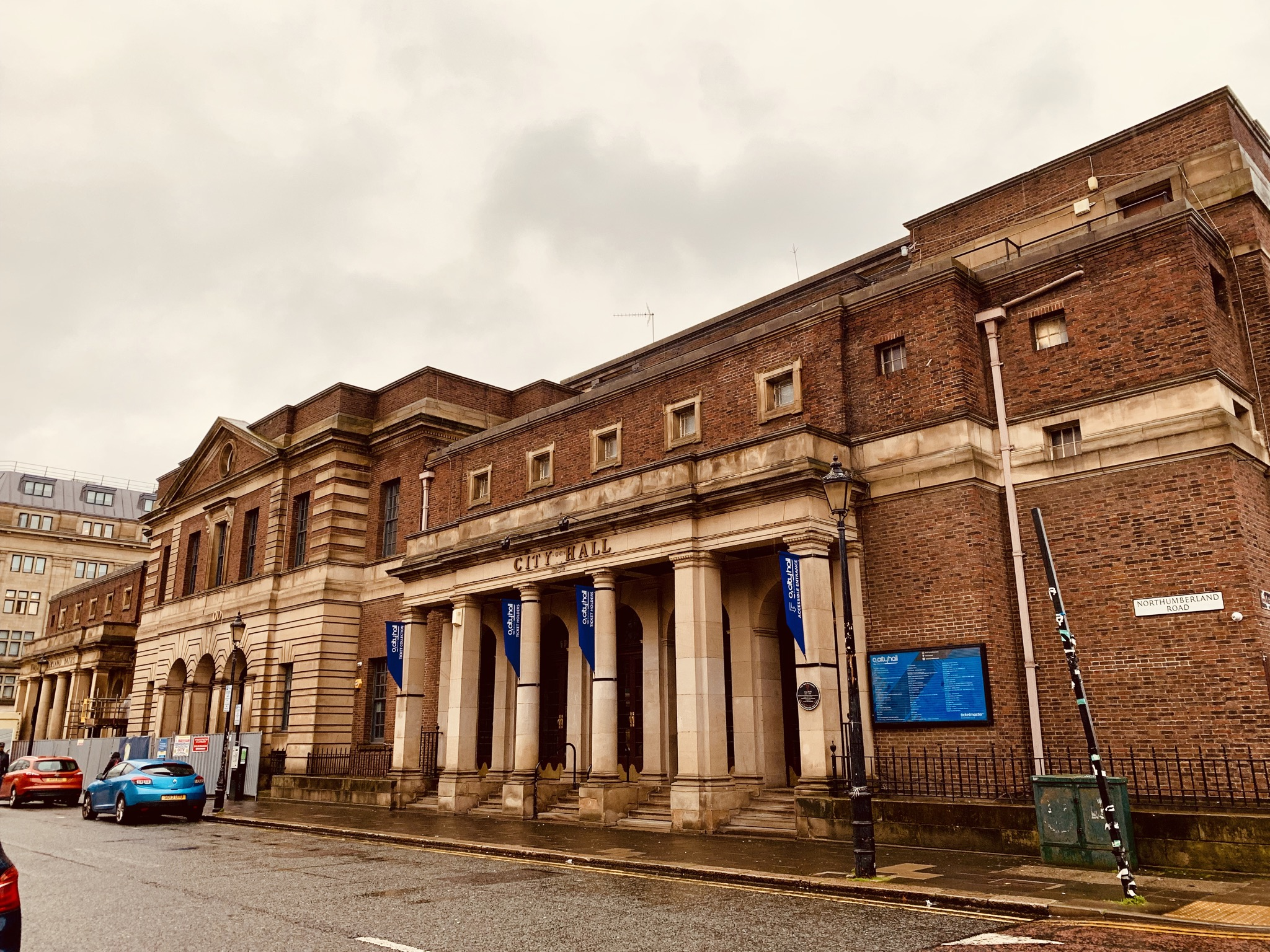
Side A of the album was recorded at the Newcastle City Hall by Glyn Johns.

As In Memoriam was a compilation of outtakes and unreleased tracks and not a standard studio album that was recorded toward an intended goal, it is by definition something of a compromise. All of the songs on side one are live tracks, recorded at the Newcastle City Hall in Newcastle upon Tyne on 18 November 1968 by Glyn Johns.For reasons best known to Immediate records, the tape was overdubbed with additional screaming and audience hysteria in February 1969. "The Universal" was also performed during this concert, but this portion of the tapes is thought to be wiped or lost.

Side two of the album is a more diverse compilation of studio outtakes, and the earliest of these hails from 21 October 1967 when the song "Call It Something Nice" was recorded in 9 takes at Olympic Studios in Barnes, London. This song may possibly have been considered for the Ogdens Nut Gone Flake album of 1968, but it is an uncharacteristically heavy and dour piece, and if it ever was part of the proposed tracklisting then the contrast in both the genre and sound must have led to its exclusion later (it is still a remarkable track however-a little too far ahead of its time for 1967 perhaps, it indicates the heavier musical direction that Steve Marriott would pursue later with Wham Bam Thank You Ma'am and then with his next band Humble Pie).

One track that has been definitively identified as an actual outtake from the Ogdens' Nut Gone Flake sessions is an instrumental piece entitled "A Collibosher", recorded in four takes on 3 April 1968. Previously thought to be from later sessions for their proposed but abandoned studio album 1862, this punchy, horn section-driven instrumental is now thought to be an orphaned backing track which never reached the stage of having vocals added to it. It was recorded on the same day as "Mad John", which did appear on Ogdens'.

On 23 May, the day before Ogdens' Nut Gone Flake was released, the band entered Trident Studios in Soho, London to record an intense, moody cover version of "Red Balloon", a song written and originally recorded by Tim Hardin on his album Tim Hardin 2 the previous year. The band recorded 6 takes of the song, and the final mix is a combination of takes 4 and 6.

The band returned to Olympic on 5 June 1968 to record overdubs for their single "The Universal", along with its B-side "Donkey Rides, A Penny A Glass. During the session they also cut "Wide Eyed Girl", an upbeat number which features both Marriott and McLagan on acoustic guitar. The track was later embellished with organ and piano overdubs and a lively brass arrangement and renamed "Wide Eyed Girl On The Wall". Like "A Collibosher", the piece is thought to have been intended to feature a vocal track, but was ultimately left as an instrumental when the vocal track was abandoned during the mixing stage.

The final studio tracks recorded by the band on 11 September 1968 were the reflective ballad "The Autumn Stone" and the contrastingly-heavy rocker "Wham Bam Thank You Ma'am", each intended as the a and b side of a prospective single that was withdrawn at the last minute. Unusually in the band's catalogue, the composition of "The Autumn Stone" is credited solely to Steve Marriott. The band's two principal songwriters, Marriott and Ronnie Lane, were usually credited as co-writers in the vein of Lennon & McCartney even though in truth they rarely composed together, and "The Autumn Stone" is the first (and only) instance of the usual practice being abandoned.

== Release and reception ==
Shortly after the Small Faces breakup was officially announced in April 1969, Immediate Records began compiling various outtakes and oddities together for a projected English album release titled In Memoriam. However, this release was opposed by former members of the band (particularly McLagan, who thought that the proposed title implied that they were dead). Not all of the tracks were originally intended to appear on an album, however. "The Autumn Stone" was originally slated for single release as a double A-side with "Wham Bam Thank You Ma'am", but this was cancelled by Immediate Records when label boss Andrew Loog Oldham expressed his dislike of the song. Marriott later noted the irony of rejecting this single, but later naming an album after it. The material was still packaged together despite the bands objections however and the final result, In Memoriam was first released in West Germany on 1 May 1969 without their consent. All of the material on In Memoriam would later receive a British release on 14 November when it was released on The Autumn Stone, a double album that also compiles most of the Small Faces singles, and their B-sides.

Professional ratings
Review scores
Source	Rating
AllMusic	3.5/5 stars

The album received mostly mixed to positive reviews. In a retrospective review by AllMusic's Bruce Eder, he states that In Memoriam was a hastily conceived album, rush-released in order to capitalize on the Small Faces' recent breakup. Noting the oddity of combining outtakes along with five live tracks, he nevertheless concludes that the collection isn't that bad, and takes pleasure in hearing the Small Faces perform live on side one, considering Marriott one of Britain's best singers. He finds the studio material on side two more mixed but notes that "The Autumn Stone" is an interesting track, commenting on its similarity (in his opinion) with the music of Syd Barrett. His review ends by stating that while In Memoriam was not the best farewell, it was not the worst either.

== Track listing ==
All tracks written by Steve Marriott and Ronnie Lane unless noted.

Side One (Live at the Newcastle City Hall in Newcastle upon Tyne, 18 November 1968)
No.	Title	Writer(s)	Lead vocals	Length
1.	"Small Faces Live"	Jimmy Avakak	Introduction by Jimmy Avakak	0:12
2.	"Rollin' Over"		Steve Marriott	2:19
3.	"If I Were A Carpenter"	Timothy Hardin	Marriott	2:36
4.	"Every Little Bit Hurts"	Ed Cobb	Marriott	6:22
5.	"All or Nothing"		Marriott	4:11
6.	"Tin Soldier"		Marriott	3:26
Total length:				19:06

Side Two (Studio tracks recorded between 21 October 1967 and 11 September 1968 at Olympic and Trident Studios, London)
No.	Title	Writer(s)	Lead vocals	Length
1.	"Collibosher"		instrumental	3:09
2.	"Call It Something Nice"		Marriott and Ronnie Lane	2:03
3.	"Red Balloon"	Hardin	Marriott	4:09
4.	"Wide Eyed Girl On The Wall"		instrumental	2:48
5.	"The Autumn Stone"	Marriott	Marriott	3:57
Total length:				16:06

== Personnel ==
Small Faces

- Steve Marriott – lead and backing vocals, harmonica, acoustic and electric guitars, piano
- Ronnie Lane – lead and backing vocals, bass guitar
- Ian McLagan – backing vocals, keyboards, acoustic and electric guitars
- Kenney Jones – drums, percussion

Other personnel

- Eddie Thornton – trumpet
- Harry Beckett – trumpet
- Derek Wadsworth – trombone
- Lyn Dobson – flute
- Unknown studio musicians – tenor and baritone saxophone
