= Memorias (Concepción Lombardo) =

Memorias is a manuscript written between 1835 and 1917 by Concepción Lombardo, First Lady of Mexico during the two presidencies of Miguel Miramón.

== Historical context ==
Memorias was written by Concepción Lombardo, who was present in various important events as First Lady of Mexico, such as the Second French intervention in Mexico, the formation and fall of the Second Mexican Empire, and the development of the Republic of Mexico under the presidency of Benito Juárez.

== Content ==
It is composed of a prologue and eleven chapters that begin with the birth, infancy, and youth of Lombardo, including her marriage. This gives an important perspective of the life of her husband, Miguel Miramón, describing the process of making several of his military and political decisions.

An example of the historical events described by Lombardo can be seen in the following, where she describes the relation between Benito Juárez and the United States in the events previous to the fall of the Second Mexican Empire:

La República Norte Americana no podía ver con buenos ojos el engrandecimiento y el progreso en nuestra amada patria, ni que hubiese un gobierno de orden y estable, que fuese respetado por las grandes potencias de Europa, y que garantizase a éstas, la vida y los intereses de sus conacionales. [...] Sin el apoyo de los E. Unidos, Juárez y todos sus secuaces, hubieran sido impotentes para derrocar el Imperio; pero ya eso era cuestión vieja, y el método adoptado por la ladrona República desde muchos años atrás, fue siempre, el fomentar en México la guerra cibil, para sacar luego la castaña con la mano del gato.

(The North American Republic couldn't see with good eyes the greatness and progress of our beloved land, nor that there was a government of order and stability, that was respected by the great governments of Europe, and that guaranteed them, the same life and interests of its compatriots. [...] Without the help of the United S., Juárez and all his accomplices, would not have been able to dethrone the Empire; however that was old news, and the method adopted by the thief that was the Republic many years back, was always, moving towards Mexican civil war, to then deceivingly take the prize.)

== Publication ==
Memorias has been published in two occasions:

- 1980 – The publisher Porrúa published Memorias by Concepción Lombardo de Miramón, and is divided in two parts:
1. The first part contains a prologue and notes by Felipe Teixidor, and Lombardo's manuscript (which still had grammatical errors and a convoluted style)
2. The second part contains the Epistolary between Miguel Miramón and Concepción Lombardo from 1858 to 1867, an extract of the military collaboration between Domingo Ibarra and Miramón between 1838 and 1860, the "Manifest to the Nation" that Miramón gave when he was interim president in 1859, the epistolary between Miramón and the general Fernando Casanova, diverse notable documents to the relation between Miramón and General Mejía, as well as the archduke Maximilian I.
- 1922 – The publisher Grijalbo published Memorias de una primera dama by Concepción Lombardo de Miramón, which contains the manuscript of Lombardo with the spelling corrected and with style correction by Emanuel Carballo.

== Bibliography ==
- Lombardo de Miramón, Concepción. 1992. Memorias de una primera dama. Mexico: Grijalbo.
- Lombardo de Miramón, Concepción. 1980. Memorias. Mexico: Porrúa
