= Sagadahoc Bridge =

Road bridge in Bath and Woolwich, Maine

- Coordinates: 43.9118°N 69.8080°W
- Carries: US 1
- Crosses: Kennebec River
- Locale: Bath – Woolwich, Maine
- Official name: Sagadahoc Bridge
- Maintained by: Maine Department of Transportation

Characteristics
- Design: Precast concrete box girder bridge
- Total length: 2,972 feet (906 m)
- Width: 69 feet (21 m)
- Height: 75 feet (23 m)
- Longest span: 420 feet (128 m)
- Clearance below: 75 feet (23 m)

History
- Opened: August 1, 2000

Location
- Interactive map of Sagadahoc Bridge

The Sagadahoc Bridge is a four-lane concrete segmental box girder bridge between the City of Bath and the town of Woolwich, Maine, carrying U.S. Route 1 (US 1) over the Kennebec River. It was completed in 2000 to replace the two-lane road portion of the adjoining 1927 Carlton Bridge, which remains in use as a rail bridge. It is 2,972-foot-long (906 m) and features the longest precast concrete segmental span in North America at 420 feet (130 m). It is also notable for being the first design/build project undertaken by the Maine Department of Transportation. The bridge cost $46.6 million, and is the last downstream road crossing of the Kennebec.

== History ==
The Longmont-based firm Flatiron Structures/Figg Engineering Group was chosen to build the bridge, and the company broke ground in October 1997. Construction proceeded faster than expected and was finished about a month early, on August 1, 2000. The final cost was $46,600,000 (equivalent to about $87,000,000 in 2025).

Funding to construct the Sagadahoc Bridge was available by 1997, but had to be committed by October of that year or the federal funds intended for it would expire. Beginning construction in the time required would not permit the traditional design, bid, and build process to be done, as it would have delayed construction by 18–24 months. MDOT decided to use a design/build process, which it had never done before. The quick construction schedule led to public concern over the aesthetics of the project. Due to that, MDOT created a Public Advisory Committee, hired a public relations firm, and held public hearings about the project to solicit public comment and input as to the aesthetics and the project contractor itself. Most aspects of the bridge were selected through public input, such as the bridge color, railings, lighting, and surrounding landscaping. The inclusion of a pedestrian underpass on the Woolwich side to access the bridge also came about due to public input.

The adjoining Carlton Bridge remained after the Sagadahoc Bridge's opening to continue as a rail bridge only, with the upper road deck severed from land on the west side and gated at the east end, preventing unauthorized vehicles from driving on it. Continuing deterioration of that bridge will necessitate action in the future regarding its continued use, possibly including removal of the remaining road deck or the bridge's closure.

=== Name ===
Residents of both Bath and Woolwich, the two towns to be connected by the bridge, participated in the structure's naming process by submitting suggested names to their respective town clerk. A committee of five people from each town was created and together selected six names for further input. Large jars were then placed in public buildings through which residents selected their choice by placing a penny into the jar of their selected name. The name "Sagadahoc", meaning 'mouth of river', was selected and subsequently approved by the Maine Legislature.

== Technical ==
The bridge carries four lanes of U.S. Route 1 (US 1) over the Kennebec River with approximately 75 feet (23 m) of clearance at high tide. SR 127 partially travels underneath the bridge on the Woolwich side to interchange with US 1. The bridge also carries a 6-foot-wide (1.8 m) bicycle/breakdown lane and a 6-foot-wide (1.8 m) barrier-protected sidewalk, with a total deck width of 69 feet (21 m).

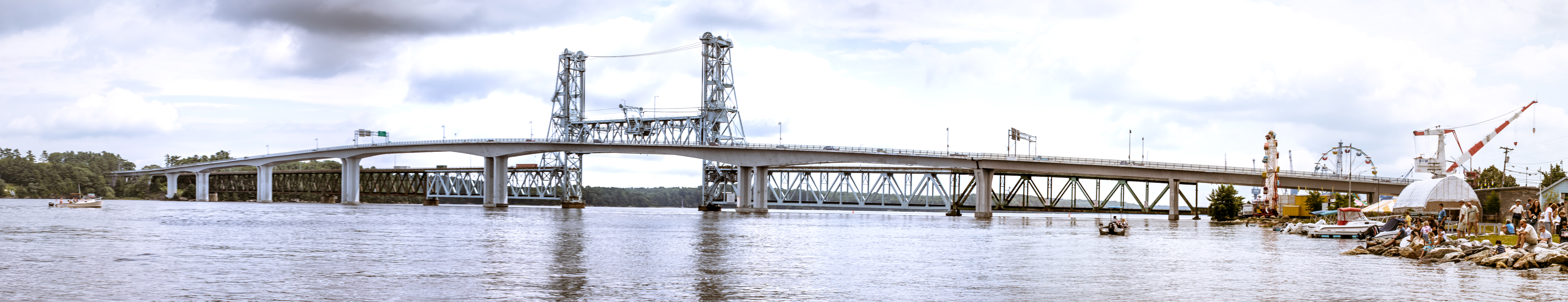
Panoramic view of Sagadahoc Bridge with the old bridge behind it, Bath, Maine, USA 2012
