= The Lucy Show (band) =

Rock/new wave band that was formed in London, England in early 1983

- The Lucy Show in 1984

Background information
- Origin: England
- Genres: Rock; alternative rock; post-punk; new wave
- Labels: Shout records, A&M Records, Piggy Bank Records, Big Time Records, Words on Music
- Members: Mark Bandola; Rob Vandeven; Pete Barraclough; Bryan Hudspeth; Paul Rigby

The Lucy Show was a rock/new wave band that was formed in London, England, in early 1983. They broke up in 1988, after 2 moderately successful studio albums.

== History ==
The band was formed by Mark Bandola (vocals, guitar, keyboards) and Rob Vandeven (vocals, bass), with Paul Rigby on drums, under the name "Midnite Movie". Rigby quickly quit, and Pete Barraclough (guitars, keyboards) and Bryan Hudspeth (drums) were added to the line-up, and the band changed name to "The Lucy Show". Bandola and Vandeven, two Canadian-born friends who had moved to England in the late 1970s, shared song writing and lead vocals equally, although the bulk of the early (pre-album) material had been written by Vandeven.

In 1983, they released their first single, "Leonardo da Vinci," on independent record label Shout Records, which managed to receive some airplay by John Peel. Guitarist Barraclough provided lead vocals on the B-side of the single for his song "Kill The Beast". In 1984, A&M Records signed the band, releasing two singles and an EP during that year (on an offshoot label imprint called Piggy Bank Records). After providing a cassette recording of their material to R.E.M., The Lucy Show was invited by the Athens band to support them on their 1984 UK tour.

In 1985, the band's debut album, ...undone, was released. With a guitar-heavy, brooding sound similar to The Cure and Comsat Angels, it received generally favourable critical notices and, even more importantly, eventually went to the No. 1 spot on the CMJ album charts in the United States. The band's momentum had been steady up to that point and they naturally assumed continuing chart success would be in their future. However, they were shocked when they learned that A&M UK decided to drop the band at the end of the year.

In 1986, the band signed to indie label Big Time Records, who released their second album, Mania. Produced by the now-legendary John Leckie, the band's songs were much more upbeat and bouncy this time around, with added acoustic guitar and piano, harmonica, synthesizer - and most noticeably, brass, making the group sound very different from their previous incarnation as a "jangly" guitar and new wave group. The change in direction initially promised to be effective, as the album once again topped the all-important CMJ charts, and MTV began playing their music video for the first single off the album, "A Million Things". Both this song, and subsequent single "New Message", were substantial college radio hits.

Bad luck would strike the band again, this time when Big Time Records went bankrupt, leaving The Lucy Show adrift. Barraclough and Hudspeth were asked to leave and Bandola and Vandeven stuck together, releasing one final single, "Wherever Your Heart Will Go", in 1988 on Redhead Records. When that single went nowhere, both Bandola and Vandeven realized it was time to quit, and they permanently disbanded The Lucy Show.

In 2005, Mania was reissued on CD by the Words on Music label, with numerous bonus tracks. In 2009, ...undone was released on CD for the first time by Words on Music. In 2011, Words on Music released Remembrances, a compilation album of rare and previously unreleased songs recorded by the band during the mid-1980s.

== Discography ==
=== Albums ===
- ...undone A&M AMA5088 (1985) LP; Words on Music WM28 (rereleased 2009) CD
- Mania Bigtime ZL71274 (1986) LP; Words on Music WM18 (rereleased 2005) CD
- Remembrances (2011) Words on Music CD

=== Singles/EPs ===
- "Leonardo da Vinci/Kill the Beast" Shout XS007 (1983)
- "Electric Dreams/History Part I" Piggy Bank BANK999 (1984)
- "See It Goes/Resistance" Piggy Bank BANK888 (1984)
- "Extended Play - The Price of Love/Resistance/See It Goes/Is It" Piggy Bank BANX888 (1984) 12"EP
- "Ephemeral (This is no Heaven)/White Space" A&M AM261 (1985) 7"
- "Ephemeral (This is no Heaven)/White Space/Leonardo da Vinci (Long Version)" A&M AMY261 (1985) 12"
- "Undone/Dream Days" A&M AM287 (1985) 7"
- "Undone (12" Mix)/Dream Days" A&M AMY287 (1985) 12"
- "A Million Things/Sojourn's End" Bigtime ZB41398 (1986) 7"
- "A Million Things/Sojourn's End/Jam in E" Bigtime ZT41398 (1986) 12"
- "New Message/Sun and Moon" Bigtime ZB41603 (1986) 7"
- "New Message (12" Mix)/Invitation/Sun and Moon/New Message (7" Mix)" Bigtime ZT41603 (1986) 12"
- "Wherever Your Heart Will Go/Only Moments Away" Redhead LUC1 (1988) 7"
- "Wherever Your Heart Will Go (12" Mix)/Wherever Your Heart Will Go (7" Mix)/Only Moments Away" Redhead LUCT1 (1988) 12"
