= Aisha Burns =

American singer-songwriter

- Born: July 1987; San Antonio, Texas, U.S.
- Genres: Folk
- Occupation: Musician
- Instruments: Violin, vocals, guitar
- Years active: 2006–present
- Labels: Western Vinyl
- Website: http://aishaburns.com/

Aisha Burns (born July 1987) is an American singer-songwriter and violinist. She is a member of the instrumental ensemble Balmorhea, and has toured and recorded with Adam Torres and Thor & Friends, among others. She has released two solo albums on Texas-based label Western Vinyl.

== Career ==
Burns was born and raised in San Antonio, Texas, United States. She began playing violin at age 10 and performed in orchestra throughout her formative years. Burns moved to Austin, Texas, in 2005 to attend the University of Texas. While in school she joined folk-rock outfit Alex Dupree & The Trapdoor Band in 2006. Through this band, she met Rob Lowe, one of the founding members of the instrumental ensemble Balmorhea, and joined the group in 2007.

After recording and touring as a violinist for six years, and contributing vocals to the Balmorhea record Stranger, Burns released her first solo album, Life in the Midwater, in 2013. The record features accompaniment by Travis Chapman on upright and electric bass and a guest solo by Alex Dupree.

Burns is the violinist featured on folk singer-songwriter Adam Torres' 2016 LP Pearls to Swine and 2017 EP I Came to Sing the Song. She also contributed to a track on experimental instrumental group Thor & Friends' 2017 release The Subversive Nature of Kindness.

Burns released her sophomore solo album, Argonauta, in May 2018. On Argonauta, called a "stunning composition" by Texas Monthly and "a poignant" album by Pitchfork, Burns' lyrics grapple with the loss of her mother in 2012 alongside the start of a new, life-changing relationship. As with her prior effort, Burns composed the string arrangements and self-produced the album, which features Jake Woodruff on guitar, Travis Chapman on bass, Dylan Reick on cello and Thor Harris on vibraphone.

Aisha has toured the U.S. and Europe, and has performed at the SXSW, NXNE, Reeperbahn and Explore the North festivals.

== Discography ==
=== Studio albums ===
- Life in the Midwater – Western Vinyl (2013)
- Argonauta – Western Vinyl (2018)
