= Memorial Bridge (Augusta, Maine) =

Bridge in Maine

Coordinates: 44.3125°N 69.7728°W

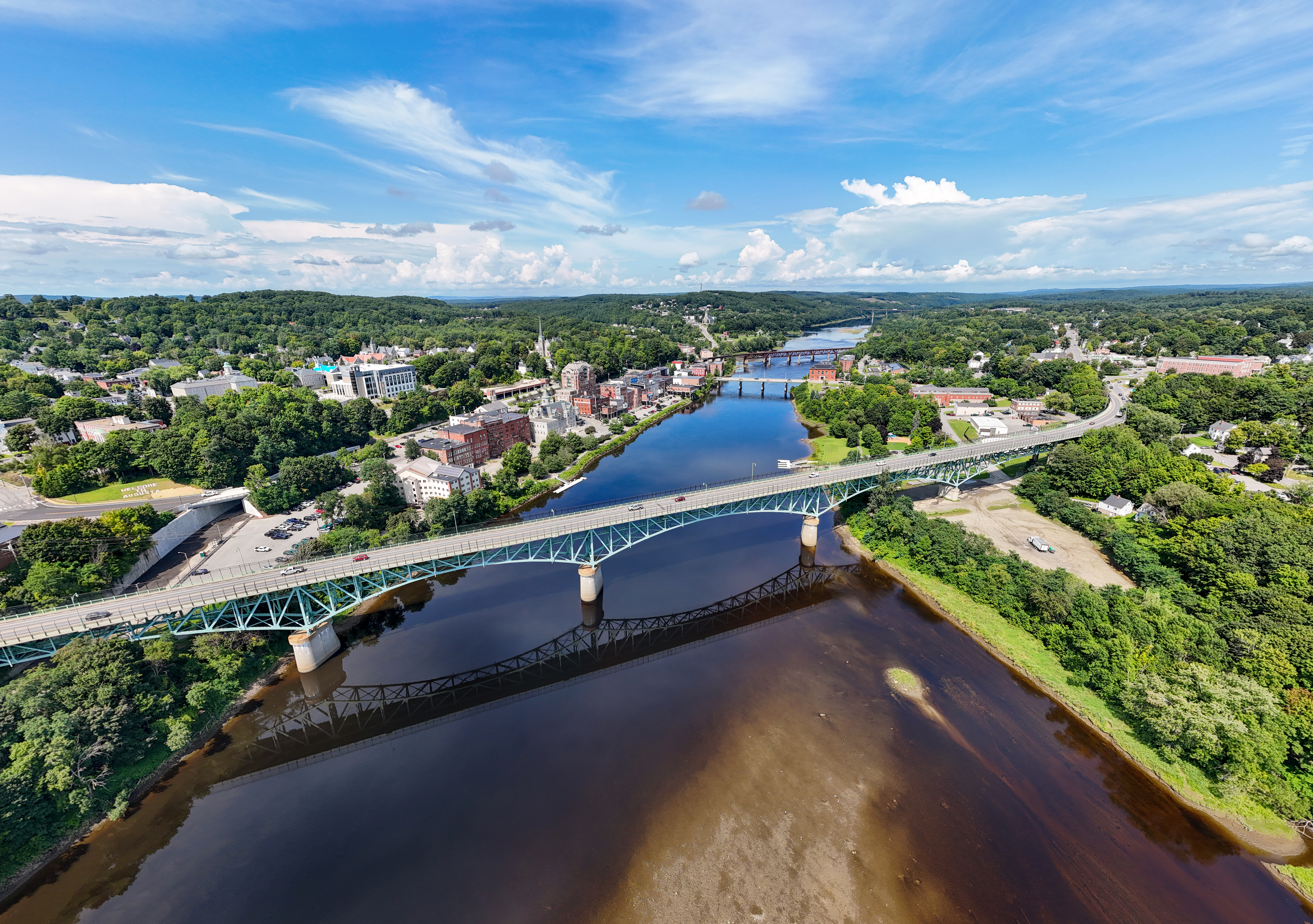
Memorial Bridge over the Kennebec River.

The Memorial Bridge is a bridge in Augusta, Maine, that crosses the Kennebec River, joining the east and west sides of the city. It carries U.S. Route 201, U.S. Route 202, Route 11, and Route 100. The bridge is approximately 2,100 feet (640 m) long and has two lanes for traffic and a barrier-protected sidewalk for pedestrians on each side of the roadway. It was built in 1949.

== Safety fence ==
The Memorial Bridge is located near a state psychiatric hospital, the Riverview Psychiatric Center. In 1983, after a number of deaths by suicide occurred on the bridge, an 11-foot‐high safety fence was installed on each side of the bridge. The fence was effective in deterring suicide by jumping.

In 2006, the fence was temporarily removed due to a renovation project, and this sparked debate on whether the fence was necessary.
