= List of Lynyrd Skynyrd members =

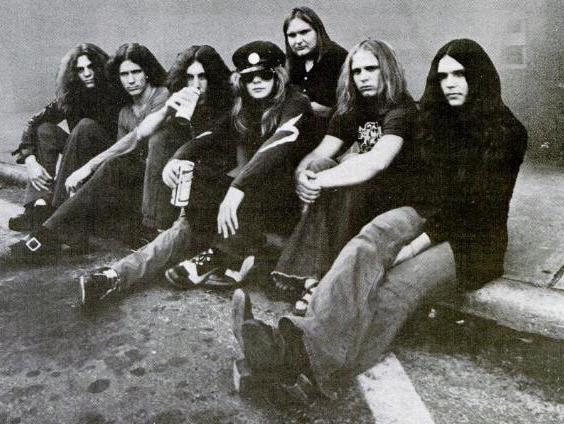
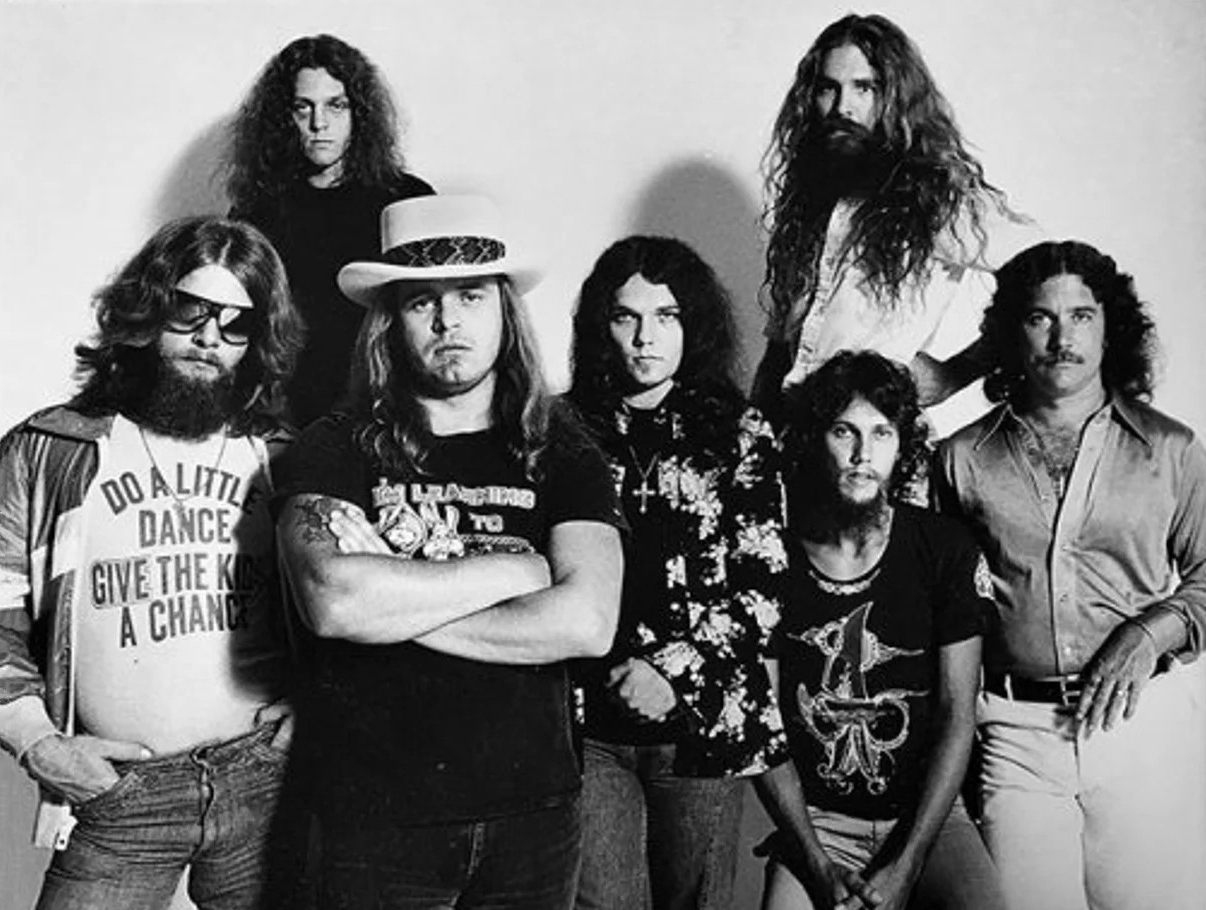
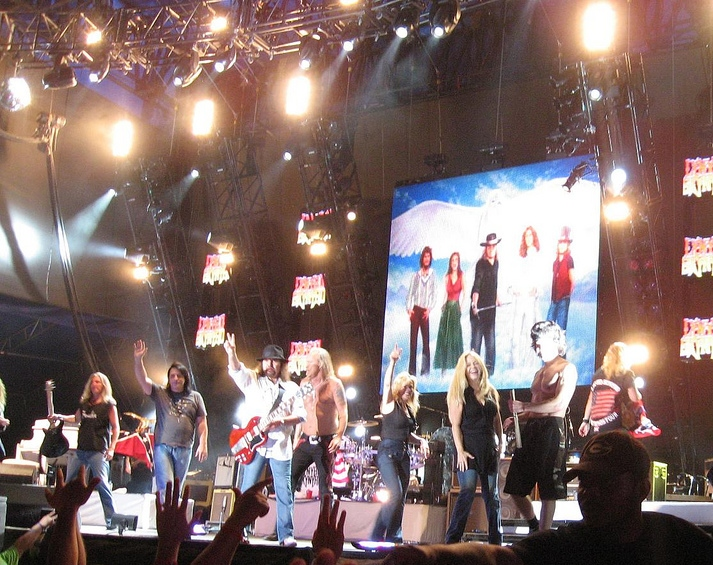
Three lineups of Lynyrd Skynyrd in 1973 (top), 1977 (middle) and 2008 (bottom).

Lynyrd Skynyrd is a Southern rock band from Jacksonville, Florida. Formed in 1964, the group originally included vocalist Ronnie Van Zant, guitarists Gary Rossington and Allen Collins, bassist Larry Junstrom and drummer Bob Burns. The group split up in 1977 following a plane crash which resulted in the deaths of three band members including Van Zant, and serious injuries to other band members.

The band reformed in 1987 with Van Zant's younger brother Johnny on vocals alongside members of the 1970s lineup. This was originally planned to be for a single tour, but the band has remained active since. The current lineup features guitarist and vocalist Rickey Medlocke (from 1971 to 1972, and since 1996), lead vocalist Johnny Van Zant (since 1987), backing vocalists Dale Krantz-Rossington (since 1987) and Carol Chase (since 1996), drummer Michael Cartellone (since 1999), guitarist Mark Matejka (since 2006), keyboardist Peter Keys (since 2009), guitarist Damon Johnson (since 2021) and bassist Robbie Harrington (since 2025).

== History ==
=== 1964–1977 ===
Lynyrd Skynyrd was formed under the name My Backyard in 1964, which was later changed to The Noble Five, and again to One Percent. The group originally included vocalist Ronnie Van Zant, guitarists Gary Rossington and Allen Collins, bassist Larry Junstrom and drummer Bob Burns, all of whom were students at Robert E. Lee High School. After performing live for several years, the band recorded for the first time in 1971, when Junstrom and Burns were replaced by Greg T. Walker and Rickey Medlocke, respectively. The following year, Walker was replaced by the band's original choice of bassist Leon Wilkeson, and Medlocke moved to third guitarist as Burns returned on drums. Medlocke had left by the end of the year. Billy Powell had also been added as the group's first keyboardist, having worked as a roadie since 1970.

Shortly before recording began for the band's debut album (Pronounced 'Lĕh-'nérd 'Skin-'nérd), Wilkeson left Lynyrd Skynyrd and was replaced by Ed King. Later during the sessions the bassist returned, with King subsequently taking up the role of third guitarist. Burns remained for 1974's Second Helping, but left in January 1975 due to touring fatigue, with Artimus Pyle taking his place. King left on May 26, 1975, two months after the release of Nuthin' Fancy. He was replaced the following year by Steve Gaines, who was recommended by his sister Cassie Gaines after she had recently joined as one of the band's touring backing vocalists, The Honkettes.

On October 20, 1977 – three days after the release of the band's fifth studio album Street Survivors – a chartered plane on which the members and crew were travelling crashed in Gillsburg, Mississippi. Six people died in the accident, including band members Ronnie Van Zant, Steve Gaines and Cassie Gaines; many of the other passengers on board were seriously injured, including Wilkeson who was left in a critical condition and reportedly declared dead three times. The group disbanded after the crash. In 1978, a collection of previously unreleased recordings from 1971 and 1972 was released as Skynyrd's First and... Last. The following year, the surviving members (with the exception of Wilkeson) reunited at Volunteer Jam for a performance of "Free Bird" with Charlie Daniels and his band.

=== 1987 onward ===
In July 1987, Lynyrd Skynyrd announced their reforming for the Lynyrd Skynyrd Tribute Tour, with returning members Rossington, King, Wilkeson, Pyle and Powell joined by new lead vocalist Johnny Van Zant, Ronnie's younger brother. Collins, who was unable to join the reunited group after a car accident the previous year left him paralyzed from the waist down, chose Randall Hall from Collins's eponymous band to take his place on guitar. After the band's first post-reformation studio album Lynyrd Skynyrd 1991, Pyle left suddenly after a show in August, with Kurt Custer taking his place. Hall left in 1993 after the release of The Last Rebel, later suing the remaining members of the band for $500,000. Custer followed Hall out of the group the next year in order to focus on his solo career.

Hall and Custer were replaced by Mike Estes and Owen Hale, respectively, both of whom performed on the 1994 album Endangered Species. King was forced to leave the band in 1996 due to health problems, with Hughie Thomasson brought in to take his place; Estes left around the same time, with former drummer Medlocke returning to the band on guitar as a result. Hale left in late 1998 after the Twenty Tour; he was replaced first by Jeff McAllister. Kenny Aronoff played on Edge of Forever but did not join and Michael Cartellone took over in 1999 after the dissolution of the Damn Yankees. On July 27, 2001, longtime bassist Leon Wilkeson died in his sleep of natural causes. He was replaced by Ean Evans, who had earlier substituted for Wilkeson at several shows the previous year.

Thomasson left Lynyrd Skynyrd in 2005 to reform his previous band Outlaws, with his replacement Mark Matejka joining early the next year. The band was forced to change its lineup twice in 2009 due to deaths in the group – first, longtime keyboardist Billy Powell died of a heart attack on January 28; and later, bassist Evans died of cancer on May 6. Peter Keys was later brought in to replace Powell, while Evans was replaced by Robert Kearns. Kearns remained until 2012, when he was replaced by former Black Crowes bassist Johnny Colt. Keith Christopher replaced Colt in mid-2017. Gary Rossington, the band's last founding member died on 5 March 2023.

== Official members ==
=== Current members ===
| Image | Name | Years active | Role | Release contributions |
|---|---|---|---|---|
| | Rickey Medlocke | 1971–1972; 1996–present | guitar (1972, 1996–present); drums (1971–1972); backing and occasional lead vocals; mandolin | Street Survivors (1977) – "One More Time" only; Skynyrd's First and... Last (1978); all Lynyrd Skynyrd releases from Twenty (1997) onward |
| | Johnny Van Zant | 1987–present | lead vocals | all Lynyrd Skynyrd releases from Southern by the Grace of God (1988) onward |
| | Dale Krantz-Rossington | 1993–present (touring 1987–1993) | backing vocals | all Lynyrd Skynyrd releases from Southern by the Grace of God (1988) onward |
| | Carol Chase | 1996–present | backing vocals | all Lynyrd Skynyrd releases from Twenty (1997) onward |
| | Michael Cartellone | 1999–present | drums; percussion | all Lynyrd Skynyrd releases from Edge of Forever (1999) onward |
| | Mark Matejka | 2006–present | guitar; backing vocals | all Lynyrd Skynyrd releases from God & Guns (2009) onward |
| | Peter Keys | 2009–present | keyboards; piano | all Lynyrd Skynyrd releases from Last of a Dyin' Breed (2012) onward |
| | Damon Johnson | 2023–present (touring substitute 2021–2023) | guitar | none |
| | Robbie Harrington | 2025–present | bass | none |

=== Former members ===
| Image | Name | Years active | Role | Release contributions |
|---|---|---|---|---|
| | Gary Rossington | 1964–1977; 1979; 1987–2023 (until his death) | guitar | all Lynyrd Skynyrd releases |
| | Allen Collins | 1964–1977; 1979; (musical director, 1987–1990) (until his death) | guitar | all Lynyrd Skynyrd releases from "Need All My Friends" / "Michelle" (1968) to Legend (1987) |
| | Ronnie Van Zant | 1964–1977 (until his death) | lead vocals; lyricist | all Lynyrd Skynyrd releases from "Need All My Friends" / "Michelle" (1968) to Legend (1987) |
| | Bob Burns | 1964–1975 (guest 2006) (died 2015) | drums | "Need All My Friends" / "Michelle" (1968); (Pronounced 'Lĕh-'nérd 'Skin-'nérd) (1973) – "all except "Tuesday's Gone" and "Mississippi Kid"; Second Helping (1974) – all except "I Need You"; Skynyrd's First and... Last (1978); Legend (1987); Lynyrd Skynyrd (1991); Collectybles (2000) |
| | Larry Junstrom | 1964–1971 (died 2019) | bass | "Need All My Friends" / "Michelle" (1968); Lynyrd Skynyrd (1991); Collectybles (2000) |
| | Greg T. Walker | 1971–1972 | bass; backing vocals | Street Survivors (1977) – "One More Time" only; Skynyrd's First and... Last (1978) |
| | Leon Wilkeson | 1972; 1973–1977; 1987–2001 (until his death) | bass; backing vocals | all Lynyrd Skynyrd releases from Second Helping (1974) – all except "I Need You" and "Don't Ask Me No Questions" to Edge of Forever (1999); Vicious Cycle (2003) – "The Way" and "Lucky Man" only |
| | Billy Powell | 1972–1977; 1979; 1987–2009 (until his death) | keyboards; piano | all Lynyrd Skynyrd releases from (Pronounced 'Lĕh-'nérd 'Skin-'nérd) (1973) to Live from Freedom Hall (2010) |
| | Ed King | 1972–1976; 1987–1996 (guest 2006) (died 2018) | guitar; bass (1972–1974); backing vocals | (Pronounced 'Lĕh-'nérd 'Skin-'nérd) (1973); Second Helping (1974); Nuthin' Fancy (1975); all Lynyrd Skynyrd releases from Skynyrd's First and... Last (1978) to Southern Knights (1996) |
| | Artimus Pyle | 1975–1977; 1979; 1987–1991 (guest 2006) | drums; percussion | all Lynyrd Skynyrd releases from Nuthin' Fancy (1975) to Lynyrd Skynyrd 1991 (1991), except Skynyrd's First and... Last (1978) |
| | Steve Gaines | 1976–1977 (until his death) | guitar; vocals | One More from the Road (1976); Street Survivors (1977); Legend (1987) |
| | Randall Hall | 1987–1993 | guitar; vocals | Southern by the Grace of God (1988); Lynyrd Skynyrd 1991 (1991); The Last Rebel (1993) |
| | Kurt Custer | 1991–1994 | drums | The Last Rebel (1993) |
| | Mike Estes | 1993–1996 | guitar; backing vocals | Endangered Species (1994); Southern Knights (1996) |
| | Owen Hale | 1994–1998 | drums; percussion | Endangered Species (1994); Southern Knights (1996); Twenty (1997); Lyve from Steel Town (1998) |
| | Debbie Davis-Estes | 1994–1996 | backing vocals | Endangered Species (1994); Southern Knights (1996) |
| | Hughie Thomasson | 1996–2005 (died 2007) | guitars; backing vocals | all Lynyrd Skynyrd releases from Twenty (1997) to Lynyrd Skynyrd Lyve: The Vicious Cycle Tour (2003) |
| | Jeff McAllister | 1998–1999 | drums | none |
| | Kenny Aronoff | 1999 | drums | Edge of Forever (1999) |
| | Ean Evans | 2001–2009 (until his death) | bass; backing vocals | all Lynyrd Skynyrd releases from Vicious Cycle (2003) to Live from Freedom Hall (2010) |
| | Robert Kearns | 2009–2012 | bass; backing vocals | none |
| | Johnny Colt | 2012–2017 | bass; backing vocals | One More for the Fans (2015); Pronounced 'Lĕh-'nérd 'Skin-'nérd & Second Helping Live from Jacksonville at the Florida Theatre (2015) |
| | Keith Christopher | 2017–2025 | bass | Last of the Street Survivors Farewell Tour Lyve! (2019); “Last of the Street Survivors” (2020) |

== Other contributors ==
=== Current touring musicians ===
| Image | Name | Years active | Instruments | Release contributions |
|---|---|---|---|---|
| | Stacy Michelle | 2023–present (touring substitute 2022–2023) | backing vocals | Stacy Michelle substituted for Dale during Rossington's recovery and has stayed on touring. |

=== Former touring musicians ===
| Image | Name | Years active | Instruments | Release contributions |
|---|---|---|---|---|
| | Cassie Gaines | 1975–1977 (until her death) | backing vocals | One More from the Road (1976); Street Survivors (1977) |
| | JoJo Billingsley | 1975–1977 (died 2010) | backing vocals | One More from the Road (1976); Street Survivors (1977) |
| | Leslie Hawkins | 1975–1977 | backing vocals | One More from the Road (1976); Street Survivors (1977) |
| | Carol Bristow | 1987–1988 | backing vocals | Southern by the Grace of God (1988) |
| | Debbie Bailey | 1991–1994 | backing vocals | none |

=== Touring substitutes ===
| Image | Name | Years active | Instruments | Notes |
|---|---|---|---|---|
| | Byron Glover | 1975; 1987-1988; 1993 (died 2010) | guitar | Glover performed with the band after Ed King's departure and also substituted later on. He also appeared on: Atlanta Live 93’ VHS (1993); Skynyrd Frynds (1994) |
| | Greg Martin | 1992 | guitar | Martin filled in for Ed King on several dates of the band's 1992 tour due to an injury. |
| | Tim Lindsey | 1993 | bass | Lindsey substituted for Wilkeson at several shows in 1993 during The Last Rebel Tour. |
| | Rick Wills | 1999 | bass | Wills substituted for Wilkeson at several shows in July 1999 during the Edge of Forever Tour. |
| | Pat Buchanan | 2007 | guitar | Filled in for Gary in 2007. |
| | Raquel Jonsen (Johnson) | 2007; 2021–2022 | backing vocals | Raquel substituted for Dale during Gary's recovery at various points. |
| | Andy Lowman | 2004; 2009; 2010 | guitar | Andy temporarily filled in for Byron. |
| | Joey Huffman | 2008 | keyboards | Huffman substituted for Powell at several shows in 2008 during the Rock & Rebels Tour. |

== Lineups ==
| Period | Members | Releases |
|---|---|---|
| June 1964 – February 1971 | Ronnie Van Zant – vocals; Gary Rossington – guitar; Allen Collins – guitar; Larry Junstrom – bass; Bob Burns – drums | "Need All My Friends" / "Michelle" (1968); Lynyrd Skynyrd (1991) – three tracks; Collectybles (2000) – nine tracks |
| February 1971 – April 1972 | Ronnie Van Zant – lead vocals; Gary Rossington – guitar; Allen Collins – guitar; Bob Burns – drums; Greg T. Walker – bass, backing vocals; Rickey Medlocke – drums, vocals | Street Survivors (1977) 2001 reissue – one track; Skynyrd's First and... Last (1978) |
| April 1972 – June 1972 | Ronnie Van Zant – lead vocals; Gary Rossington – guitar; Allen Collins – guitar; Bob Burns – drums; Rickey Medlocke – guitar, vocals; Leon Wilkeson – bass, backing vocals | none |
| June 1972 – August 1972 | Ronnie Van Zant – lead vocals; Gary Rossington – guitar; Allen Collins – guitar; Bob Burns – drums; Leon Wilkeson – bass, backing vocals | Skynyrd's First and... Last (1978) |
| August 1972 – October 1972 | Ronnie Van Zant – lead vocals; Gary Rossington – guitar; Allen Collins – guitar; Bob Burns – drums; Leon Wilkeson – bass, backing vocals; Billy Powell – keyboards, piano | Skynyrd's First and... Last (1978) |
| October 1972 – June 1973 | Ronnie Van Zant – lead vocals; Gary Rossington – guitar; Allen Collins – guitar; Bob Burns – drums; Billy Powell – keyboards, piano; Ed King – bass, guitar, backing vocals | (Pronounced 'Lĕh-'nérd 'Skin-'nérd) (1973) |
| June 1973 – January 1975 | Ronnie Van Zant – lead vocals; Gary Rossington – guitar; Allen Collins – guitar; Bob Burns – drums; Leon Wilkeson – bass, backing vocals; Billy Powell – keyboards, piano; Ed King – guitar, backing vocals, bass | Second Helping (1974) |
| January – May 1975 | Ronnie Van Zant – lead vocals; Gary Rossington – guitar; Allen Collins – guitar; Leon Wilkeson – bass, backing vocals; Billy Powell – keyboards, piano; Ed King – guitar, backing vocals; Artimus Pyle – drums, percussion | Nuthin' Fancy (1975) |
| May 1975 – June 1976 | Ronnie Van Zant – lead vocals; Gary Rossington – guitar; Allen Collins – guitar; Leon Wilkeson – bass, backing vocals; Billy Powell – keyboards, piano; Artimus Pyle – drums, percussion | Gimme Back My Bullets (1976) |
| June 1976 – October 1977 | Ronnie Van Zant – lead vocals; Gary Rossington – guitar; Allen Collins – guitar; Leon Wilkeson – bass, backing vocals; Billy Powell – keyboards, piano; Artimus Pyle – drums, percussion; Steve Gaines – guitar, vocals | One More from the Road (1976); Street Survivors (1977) – remaining tracks |
Band inactive October 1977 – January 1979
| January 1979 | Gary Rossington – guitar; Allen Collins – guitar; Billy Powell – keyboards, piano; Artimus Pyle – drums, percussion | none – one show |
Band inactive January 1979 – June 19, 1987
| June 19, 1987 – August 1991 | Gary Rossington – guitar; Leon Wilkeson – bass, backing vocals; Billy Powell – keyboards, piano; Ed King – guitar, backing vocals; Artimus Pyle – drums, percussion; Johnny Van Zant – lead vocals; Randall Hall – guitar, backing vocals; with: Allen Collins – musical director (until January 23, 1990) | Southern by the Grace of God (1988); Lynyrd Skynyrd Tribute Tour (1988); Lynyrd Skynyrd 1991 (1991) |
| August 1991 – February 1993 | Gary Rossington – guitar; Leon Wilkeson – bass, backing vocals; Billy Powell – keyboards, piano; Ed King – guitar, backing vocals; Johnny Van Zant – lead vocals; Randall Hall – guitar, backing vocals; Kurt Custer – drums, percussion | none |
| February 1993 – June 1993 | Gary Rossington – guitar; Leon Wilkeson – bass, backing vocals; Billy Powell – keyboards, piano; Ed King – guitar, backing vocals; Johnny Van Zant – lead vocals; Randall Hall – guitar, backing vocals; Kurt Custer – drums, percussion; Dale Krantz-Rossington – backing vocals | The Last Rebel (1993) |
| August 1993 – March 1994 | Gary Rossington – guitar; Leon Wilkeson – bass, backing vocals; Billy Powell – keyboards, piano; Ed King – guitar, backing vocals; Johnny Van Zant – lead vocals; Kurt Custer – drums, percussion; Dale Krantz-Rossington – backing vocals; Mike Estes – guitar, backing vocals | none |
| April 1994 – May 1996 | Gary Rossington – guitar; Leon Wilkeson – bass, backing vocals; Billy Powell – keyboards, piano; Ed King – guitar, backing vocals; Johnny Van Zant – lead vocals; Dale Krantz-Rossington – backing vocals; Mike Estes – guitar, backing vocals; Owen Hale – drums, percussion; Debbie Davis-Estes – backing vocals | Endangered Species (1994); Southern Knights (1996) |
| May 1996 – October 1998 | Gary Rossington – guitar; Leon Wilkeson – bass, backing vocals; Billy Powell – keyboards, piano; Rickey Medlocke – guitar, backing vocals; Johnny Van Zant – lead vocals; Owen Hale – drums, percussion; Dale Krantz-Rossington – backing vocals; Hughie Thomasson – guitar, backing vocals; Carol Chase – backing vocals | Twenty (1997); Lyve from Steel Town (1998); Sweet Home Alabama (2015) |
| October 1998 – February 1999 | Gary Rossington – guitar; Leon Wilkeson – bass, backing vocals; Billy Powell – keyboards, piano; Rickey Medlocke – guitar, backing vocals; Johnny Van Zant – lead vocals; Dale Krantz-Rossington – backing vocals; Hughie Thomasson – guitar, backing vocals; Carol Chase – backing vocals; Jeff McAllister – drums, percussion | none |
| February – April-1999 | Gary Rossington – guitar; Leon Wilkeson – bass, backing vocals; Billy Powell – keyboards, piano; Rickey Medlocke – guitar, backing vocals; Johnny Van Zant – lead vocals; Dale Krantz-Rossington – backing vocals; Hughie Thomasson – guitar, backing vocals; Carol Chase – backing vocals; Kenny Aronoff – drums, percussion | Edge of Forever (1999) |
| April 1999 – July 2001 | Gary Rossington – guitar; Leon Wilkeson – bass, backing vocals; Billy Powell – keyboards, piano; Rickey Medlocke – guitar, backing vocals; Johnny Van Zant – lead vocals; Dale Krantz-Rossington – backing vocals; Hughie Thomasson – guitar, backing vocals; Carol Chase – backing vocals; Michael Cartellone – drums, percussion | Christmas Time Again (2000); Vicious Cycle (2003) – two tracks |
| August 2001 – April 2005 | Gary Rossington – guitar; Billy Powell – keyboards, piano; Rickey Medlocke – guitar, backing vocals; Johnny Van Zant – lead vocals; Dale Krantz-Rossington – backing vocals; Hughie Thomasson – guitar, backing vocals; Carol Chase – backing vocals; Michael Cartellone – drums, percussion; Ean Evans – bass, backing vocals | Vicious Cycle (2003) – remaining tracks; The Vicious Cycle Tour (2004) |
| April 2005 – March 2006 | Gary Rossington – guitar; Billy Powell – keyboards, piano; Rickey Medlocke – guitar, backing vocals; Johnny Van Zant – lead vocals; Dale Krantz-Rossington – backing vocals; Carol Chase – backing vocals; Michael Cartellone – drums, percussion; Ean Evans – bass, backing vocals | none |
| March 2006 – January 2009 | Gary Rossington – guitar; Billy Powell – keyboards, piano; Rickey Medlocke – guitar, backing vocals; Johnny Van Zant – lead vocals; Dale Krantz-Rossington – backing vocals; Carol Chase – backing vocals; Michael Cartellone – drums, percussion; Ean Evans – bass, backing vocals; Mark Matejka – guitar, backing vocals | God & Guns (2009); Live from Freedom Hall (2010); Live in Atlantic City (2018) |
| February – May 2009 | Gary Rossington – guitar; Rickey Medlocke – guitar, backing vocals; Johnny Van Zant – lead vocals; Dale Krantz-Rossington – backing vocals; Carol Chase – backing vocals; Michael Cartellone – drums, percussion; Ean Evans – bass, backing vocals; Mark Matejka – guitar, backing vocals; Peter Keys – keyboards, piano | none |
| June 2009 – May 2012 | Gary Rossington – guitar; Rickey Medlocke – guitar, backing vocals; Johnny Van Zant – lead vocals; Dale Krantz-Rossington – backing vocals; Carol Chase – backing vocals; Michael Cartellone – drums, percussion; Mark Matejka – guitar, backing vocals; Peter Keys – keyboards, piano; Robert Kearns – bass, backing vocals | none |
| May 2012 – June 2017 | Gary Rossington – guitar; Rickey Medlocke – guitar, backing vocals; Johnny Van Zant – lead vocals; Dale Krantz-Rossington – backing vocals; Carol Chase – backing vocals; Michael Cartellone – drums, percussion; Mark Matejka – guitar, backing vocals; Peter Keys – keyboards, piano; Johnny Colt – bass, backing vocals | Last of a Dyin' Breed (2012); One More for the Fans (2015); Pronounced 'Lĕh-'nérd 'Skin-'nérd & Second Helping Live from Jacksonville at the Florida Theatre (2015) |
| June 2017 – March 2023 | Gary Rossington – guitar; Rickey Medlocke – guitar, backing vocals; Johnny Van Zant – lead vocals; Dale Krantz-Rossington – backing vocals; Carol Chase – backing vocals; Michael Cartellone – drums, percussion; Mark Matejka – guitar, backing vocals; Peter Keys – keyboards, piano; Keith Christopher – bass | Last of the Street Survivors Farewell Tour Lyve! (2019); "Last of the Street Survivors" (2020) |
| March 2023 – February 2025 | Rickey Medlocke – guitar, backing vocals; Johnny Van Zant – lead vocals; Carol Chase – backing vocals; Michael Cartellone – drums, percussion; Mark Matejka – guitar, backing vocals; Peter Keys – keyboards, piano; Keith Christopher – bass; Damon Johnson – guitar; Stacey Michelle – backing vocals | none |
| February 2025 – present | Rickey Medlocke – guitar, backing vocals; Johnny Van Zant – lead vocals; Carol Chase – backing vocals; Michael Cartellone – drums, percussion; Mark Matejka – guitar, backing vocals; Peter Keys – keyboards, piano; Damon Johnson – guitar; Stacey Michelle – backing vocals; Robbie Harrington – bass | none |

== Bibliography ==
- Ribowsky, Mark (April 1, 2015), Whiskey Bottles and Brand-New Cars: The Fast Life and Sudden Death of Lynyrd Skynyrd, Chicago, Illinois: Chicago Review Press, ISBN 978-1569761465
