= Lynyrd Skynyrd (album) =

Lynyrd Skynyrd (Box Set)

Box set by Lynyrd Skynyrd
- Released: November 12, 1991
- Recorded: 1970–1977
- Genres: Southern rock, boogie rock
- Length: 214:27
- Label: MCA Records
- Producers: Tom Dowd; David Johnson; Jimmy Johnson; Al Kooper; Andy McKaie; Bob Meyerowitz; Ron O'Brien; Tim Smith

Lynyrd Skynyrd chronology
Lynyrd Skynyrd 1991 (1991)	Lynyrd Skynyrd (Box Set) (1991)	The Last Rebel (1993)

Professional ratings
Review scores
Source	Rating
AllMusic	4.5/5 stars

Lynyrd Skynyrd is the first box set by American rock band Lynyrd Skynyrd. It features outtakes, demos and live versions of songs from their first six albums. It was certified gold by the RIAA in November 1997.

== Track listing ==
=== Disc 1 (1970–1973) ===
1. "Free Bird" (Edited Demo, Oct 1970) (Allen Collins, Ronnie Van Zant) – 4:07
2. "Junkie" (Demo, Oct 1970) (Collins, Van Zant) – 3:48
3. "He's Alive" (Demo, Oct 1970) (Collins, Van Zant) – 3:09
4. "One More Time" (Original version, 1971) (Gary Rossington, Van Zant) – 5:02
5. "Gimme Three Steps" (Original version, 1971) (Collins, Van Zant) – 4:08
6. "Trust" (Original version, 1971) (Collins, Van Zant) – 4:12
7. "Comin' Home" (1971) (Collins, Van Zant) – 5:29
8. "Mr. Banker" (Demo, early 1973)" (Ed King, Rossington, Van Zant) – 5:18
9. "Down South Jukin'" (Demo, early 1973) (Rossington, Van Zant) – 2:53
10. "Truck Drivin' Man" (Demo, early 1973) (King, Van Zant) – 5:15
11. "I Ain't the One" (Demo, early 1973) (Rossington, Van Zant) – 3:46
12. "Poison Whiskey" (Demo. early 1973) (King, Van Zant) – 3:08
13. "Tuesday's Gone" (Collins, Van Zant) – 7:32
14. "Things Goin' On" (Rossington, Van Zant) – 4:58
15. "Free Bird" (Collins, Van Zant) – 9:09

=== Disc 2 (1974–1976) ===
1. "Sweet Home Alabama" (King, Rossington, Van Zant) – 4:43
2. "Was I Right or Wrong?" (recorded Jan 1974) (previously unreleased) (Rossington, Van Zant) – 5:08
3. "Workin' for MCA" (King, Van Zant) – 4:46
4. "Don't Ask Me No Questions" (Rossington, Van Zant) – 3:24
5. "Swamp Music" (King, Van Zant) – 3:31
6. "The Ballad of Curtis Loew" (Collins, Van Zant) – 4:50
7. "The Needle and the Spoon" (Collins, Van Zant) – 3:52
8. "Call Me the Breeze" (J.J. Cale) – 5:06
9. "Saturday Night Special" (King, Van Zant) – 5:08
10. "Made in the Shade" (Van Zant) – 4:39
11. "Am I Losin'?" (Rossington, Van Zant) – 4:33
12. "On the Hunt" (Collins, Van Zant) – 5:26
13. "(I Got the) Same Old Blues" (Cale) – 4:07
14. "Double Trouble" (Live) (Collins, Van Zant) – 3:03
15. "Roll Gypsy Roll" (Collins, Rossington, Van Zant) – 2:49
16. "All I Can Do Is Write About It" (Acoustic version) (recorded November 28, 1975) (previously unreleased) (Collins, Van Zant) – 4:20
17. "Four Walls of Raiford" (undubbed demo) (recorded Apr 1976) (Carlisi, Van Zant) – 4:12

=== Disc 3 (1976–1977) ===
1. "Gimme Back My Bullets" (Live) (Rossington, Van Zant) – 3:37
2. "Searchin'" (Live) (Collins, Van Zant) – 4:00
3. "Simple Man" (Live) (Rossington, Van Zant) – 6:48
4. "Crossroads" (Live) (Robert Johnson) – 4:17
5. "T for Texas (Blue Yodel#1)" (Live) (Jimmie Rodgers) – 8:42
6. "Whiskey Rock-A-Roller" (Live) (King, Billy Powell, Van Zant) – 4:16
7. "Ain't No Good Life" (Steve Gaines) – 4:38
8. "What's Your Name?" (Alternate mix) (Rossington, Van Zant) – 3:38
9. "Georgia Peaches" (Gaines, Van Zant) – 3:12
10. "What's Your Name?" (Rossington, Van Zant) – 3:31
11. "I Never Dreamed" (Gaines, Van Zant) – 5:19
12. "I Know a Little" (Gaines) – 3:26
13. "Honky Tonk Night Time Man" (Merle Haggard) – 4:02
14. "That Smell" (Collins, Van Zant) – 5:47
15. "You Got That Right" (Gaines, Van Zant) – 3:45
- Disc 1, track 7 from Skynyrd's First and... Last (1978)
- Disc 1, tracks 8 and 10 from Legend (1987)
- Disc 1, tracks 13–15 from (Pronounced 'Lĕh-'nérd 'Skin-'nérd) (1973)
- Disc 2, tracks 1 and 3–8 from Second Helping (1974)
- Disc 2, tracks 9–12 from Nuthin' Fancy (1975)
- Disc 2, tracks 13 and 15 from Gimme Back My Bullets (1976)
- Disc 3, tracks 2 and 4–5 from One More from the Road (1976)
- Disc 3, tracks 7 and 10–15 from Street Survivors (1977)
- Disc 3, tracks 3 and 9 from Legend (1987)
- All other songs are previously unreleased (1991)

==== Live songs ====
- Disc 2, track 14 recorded April 11, 1975, at the Capitol Theatre in Cardiff, Wales
- Disc 3, tracks 1 and 5 recorded August 7, 1976, at the Fox Theatre in Atlanta, Georgia, U.S.
- Disc 3, tracks 2 and 4 recorded September 7, 1976, at the Fox Theatre in Atlanta, Georgia, U.S.
- Disc 3, track 3 recorded July 7, 1976, at the Fox Theatre in Atlanta, Georgia, U.S.
- Disc 3, track 6 recorded August 21, 1976, at the Knebworth Festival in Hertfordshire, England

== Personnel ==
Taken from MCA Records 1991 CD box set release MCAD3-10390 liner notes

Lynyrd Skynyrd 1

Disc 1, Tracks 1–3

- Ronnie Van Zant – vocals
- Allen Collins – guitars
- Gary Rossington – guitars
- Larry Junstrom – bass
- Bob Burns – drums

Lynyrd Skynyrd 2

Disc 1, Tracks 4–7

- Ronnie Van Zant – vocals (7, overdubbed 1975)
- Allen Collins – guitars
- Gary Rossington – guitars

Additional musicians

- Greg Walker – bass (4,7)
- Leon Wilkeson – bass (5,6)
- Ricky Medlocke – drums, background vocals (4,7)
- Bob Burns – drums (5,6)
- Billy Powell – piano (7, overdubbed 1975)
- Ed King – guitar (7, overdubbed 1975)
- Tim Smith – background vocals (4)

Lynyrd Skynyrd 3

Disc 1, Tracks 8–15

- Ronnie Van Zant – vocals
- Allen Collins – guitars (except 8)
- Gary Rossington – guitars
- Ed King – bass (all tracks except 8 & 13), guitar (8)
- Bob Burns – drums (except 8 & 13)
- Billy Powell – piano (except 8)

Additional musicians

- Roosevelt Gook (Al Kooper) – bass (13), mellotron (13), backup harmony (13), organ (14)
- Robert Nix – drums (13)
- Bobbye Hall – percussion (14)

Lynyrd Skynyrd 4

Disc 2, Tracks 1–9

- Ronnie Van Zant – vocals, background vocals (4)
- Allen Collins – guitars
- Gary Rossington – guitars
- Ed King – guitars
- Billy Powell – keyboards
- Leon Wilkeson – bass, background vocals (3–5,8,9)
- Bob Burns – drums

Additional musicians

- Clydie King, Merry Clayton, Sherlie Matthews & Friends – background vocals (1)
- Al Kooper – piano (4,6), horn arrangement (4,8), acoustic guitar (6), background vocal (6), moog synthesizers (9)
- Bobby Keys, Trevor Lawrence, Steve Madiao – horns (4,8)
- Handclapping by Wicker, Toby Cockroad, Moochie, Punnel, Wolfman, Kooder, Mr. Feeback, and Gooshie (8)

Lynyrd Skynyrd 5

Disc 2, Tracks 10–12

- Ronnie Van Zant – vocals, background vocals (1)
- Allen Collins – guitars
- Gary Rossington – guitars
- Ed King – guitars, background vocals (1)
- Billy Powell – keyboards, piano (1)
- Leon Wilkeson – bass
- Artimus Pyle – drums, percussion

Additional musicians

- Al Kooper – background vocals (1,2)
- David Foster – piano (1)

Lynyrd Skynyrd 6

Disc 2, Tracks 13–17

- Ronnie Van Zant – vocals, guitar (17)
- Allen Collins – guitars
- Gary Rossington – guitars
- Leon Wilkeson – bass
- Billy Powell – keyboards
- Artimus Pyle – drums, percussion

Additional musicians

- Jeff Carlisi – guitar (17)

Lynyrd Skynyrd 7

Disc 3 (all tracks)

- Ronnie Van Zant – vocals
- Allen Collins – guitars
- Gary Rossington – guitars, overdubs (9)
- Steve Gaines – guitars, lead vocals (7), vocals (15)
- Leon Wilkeson – bass, overdubs (9)
- Billy Powell – keyboards, overdubs (9)
- Artimus Pyle – drums, percussion

Additional musicians

- "The Honkettes" (Cassie Gaines, JoJo Billingsley, Leslie Hawkins) – background vocals (6,14)

== Certifications ==
Region	Certification	Certified units/sales
United States (RIAA)	Gold	500,000^{^}
^{^} Shipments figures based on certification alone.
