= Skynyrd's Innyrds =

Skynyrd's Innyrds: Their Greatest Hits

Greatest hits album by Lynyrd Skynyrd
- Released: April 30, 1989
- Recorded: 1973–1977
- Genre: Southern rock
- Length: 62:37
- Label: MCA
- Producer: Al Kooper, Tom Dowd, John Ryan
- Compiler: Andy McKaie

Lynyrd Skynyrd chronology
| Southern by the Grace of God (1988) | Skynyrd's Innyrds: Their Greatest Hits (1989) | Lynyrd Skynyrd 1991 (1991) |

Professional ratings
Review scores
| Source | Rating |
|---|---|
| AllMusic | 3/5 stars |
| The New Rolling Stone Album Guide | 3/5 stars |

Skynyrd's Innyrds: Their Greatest Hits is a Lynyrd Skynyrd greatest hits album, released in 1989. The tracks were recorded between 1973 and April 1977.

A notable inclusion is the "Outtake Version" of "Free Bird", which, with a longer running time of 10:08, differs from the original 1973 studio recording (from (Pronounced 'Lĕh-'nérd 'Skin-'nérd)) of the song (timed at 9:08) by having a concluding outro instead of a fade-out ending.

The album was certified 5× platinum in July 2001 by the RIAA, making it the band's highest-selling album.

== Track listing ==
| No. | Title | Writer(s) | Notes | Length |
|---|---|---|---|---|
| 1. | "Sweet Home Alabama" | Ed King, Gary Rossington, Ronnie Van Zant | | 4:42 |
| 2. | "Swamp Music" | Ed King, Ronnie Van Zant | | 3:32 |
| 3. | "I Ain't the One" | Gary Rossington, Ronnie Van Zant | | 3:54 |
| 4. | "Gimme Three Steps" | Allen Collins, Ronnie Van Zant | | 4:30 |
| 5. | "Double Trouble (Outtake Version)" | Allen Collins, Ronnie Van Zant | | 2:50 |
| 6. | "Free Bird (Extended Music Version)" | Allen Collins, Ronnie Van Zant | | 10:08 |
| 7. | "Truck Drivin' Man" | Ed King, Ronnie Van Zant | Bonus track for CD prints only | 5:16 |
| 8. | "Saturday Night Special" | Ed King, Ronnie Van Zant | | 5:07 |
| 9. | "Workin' for MCA" | Ed King, Ronnie Van Zant | | 4:49 |
| 10. | "What's Your Name?" | Gary Rossington, Ronnie Van Zant | | 3:32 |
| 11. | "That Smell" | Allen Collins, Ronnie Van Zant | | 5:52 |
| 12. | "Don't Ask Me No Questions" | Gary Rossington, Ronnie Van Zant | | 3:26 |
| 13. | "Call Me the Breeze" | J. J. Cale | | 5:08 |
| Total length: | | | | 62:37 |

- Tracks 1–2, 9, 12–13 from Second Helping (1974)
- Tracks 3–4, 6 (Faded-Out Version) from (Pronounced 'Lĕh-'nérd 'Skin-'nérd) (1973)
- Track 5 (original) from Gimme Back My Bullets (1976)
- Track 7 from Legend (1987)
- Track 8 from Nuthin' Fancy (1975)
- Tracks 10–11 from Street Survivors (1977)
- Tracks 5 and 6 (Full Version) are previously unreleased

== Certifications ==
| Region | Certification | Certified units/sales |
|---|---|---|
| Australia (ARIA) | Gold | 35,000^{^} |
| United States (RIAA) | 5× Platinum | 5,000,000^{^} |
^{^} Shipments figures based on certification alone.
