= Lynyrd Skynyrd 1991 =

Studio album by Lynyrd Skynyrd
- Released: June 11, 1991
- Genre: Southern rock
- Length: 51:51
- Label: Atlantic
- Producers: Tom Dowd; Reissue producer: Joe Reagoso

Lynyrd Skynyrd chronology
Skynyrd's Innyrds: Their Greatest Hits (1989)	Lynyrd Skynyrd 1991 (1991)	Lynyrd Skynyrd (Box Set) (1991)

Professional ratings
Review scores
Source	Rating
AllMusic	2/5 stars
Rolling Stone	3/5 stars

Lynyrd Skynyrd 1991 is the sixth studio album by American Southern rock band Lynyrd Skynyrd. It was the band's first new studio album since 1977's Street Survivors and the first following a 1977 plane crash that killed three members of the band.

== Overview ==
Lead vocalist Ronnie Van Zant and lead guitarist Steve Gaines died in a 1977 plane crash in Mississippi, and Lynyrd Skynyrd 1991 is the first album to feature their replacements, lead vocalist Johnny Van Zant (Ronnie's younger brother) and guitarist Randall Hall. It also marks the return of original guitarist Ed King, who parted ways with the band while touring in support of Nuthin' Fancy in 1975. Drummer and plane crash survivor Artimus Pyle is credited on the album but does not appear; new drummer Kurt Custer recorded all drums. Pyle was not involved in the process, which lead to rising tension resulting in his departure from the group on August 2, 1991. Guitarist and founding member Allen Collins also survived the 1977 plane crash but died in 1990 from chronic pneumonia.

"Smokestack Lightning" was released as a single with an accompanying music video and was met with moderate success.

== Track listing ==
No.	Title	Writer(s)	Length
1.	"Smokestack Lightning"	Todd Cerney, Ed King, Gary Rossington, Johnny Van Zant	4:28
2.	"Keeping the Faith"	King, G. Rossington, Danny Tate, J. Van Zant	5:18
3.	"Southern Women"	King, Dale Krantz-Rossington, G. Rossington, J. Van Zant	4:16
4.	"Pure & Simple"	King, Michael Lunn, J. Van Zant, Robert White Johnson	3:09
5.	"I've Seen Enough"	Kurt Custer, Lunn, G. Rossington, J. Van Zant, White Johnson	4:22
6.	"Good Thing"	G. Rossington, Donnie Van Zant, J. Van Zant	5:28
7.	"Money Man"	King, J. Van Zant	3:46
8.	"Backstreet Crawler"	Randall Hall, King, G. Rossington	5:31
9.	"It's a Killer"	King, G. Rossington, D. Van Zant, J. Van Zant	3:54
10.	"Mama (Afraid to Say Goodbye)"	King, G. Rossington, D. Van Zant, J. Van Zant	6:44
11.	"End of the Road"	Cerney, King, G. Rossington, J. Van Zant	4:34
Total length:			51:51

== Personnel ==
Lynyrd Skynyrd

- Gary Rossington - guitar
- Ed King - guitar
- Leon Wilkeson - bass
- Billy Powell - keyboard, piano
- Johnny Van Zant - vocals
- Randall Hall - guitar
- Kurt Custer - drums
- Artimus Pyle - drums and percussion (credited; did not play)

Additional personnel

- Eric Martin - backing vocals on "Pure & Simple"
- Dale Krantz-Rossington - backing vocals
- Stephanie Bolton - backing vocals
- Susan Marshall - backing vocals
- Randall Hall - "Money Man"

Production personnel

- Tom Dowd – producer
- Kevin Elson – engineer, mixing, overdub engineer, overdubs
- Carol Friedman – photography
- John Hampton – engineer
- Bob Ludwig – mastering
- Jeff Powell – assistant, assistant engineer
- Joe Reagoso – reissue producer, remastering
- Randy Tuten – art direction, artwork, design

== Charts ==
Chart (1991)	Peak position
Canada Top Albums/CDs (RPM)	39
Finnish Albums (The Official Finnish Charts)	17
Swedish Albums (Sverigetopplistan)	44
US Billboard 200	64
