= Southern by the Grace of God =

Live album by Lynyrd Skynyrd
- Released: March 21, 1988
- Recorded: 1987
- Genre: Southern rock
- Length: 72:21
- Label: MCA

Lynyrd Skynyrd chronology
Legend (1987)	Southern by the Grace of God (1988)	Skynyrd's Innyrds: Their Greatest Hits (1989)

Professional ratings
Review scores
Source	Rating
AllMusic	4.5/5 stars

Southern by the Grace of God is a live album by southern rock band Lynyrd Skynyrd, recorded during the Lynyrd Skynyrd Tribute Tour in 1987. These live concerts were a 10-year anniversary tribute by Lynyrd Skynyrd to the members of the band who had died in a 1977 plane crash. The plane crash killed frontman Ronnie Van Zant, guitarist Steve Gaines, backing vocalist Cassie Gaines and road manager Dean Kilpatrick.

The band's lineup for the concerts was re-worked into a second-generation Skynyrd. The changes include: Johnny Van Zant, younger brother of Ronnie Van Zant, taking over on vocals, Ed King, who departed the band during a 1975 tour and Randall Hall, who replaced the paralyzed Allen Collins. The three (King, Hall along with founding member Gary Rossington) re-form the famous triple-lead guitar attack of the original band. New background vocalists Carol Bristow and Dale Krantz-Rossington were added to take the place of the original Honkettes.

This is the first album of new recordings produced by the band after the '77 plane crash. The last track is an instrumental version of the band's iconic song “Free Bird”, having a much longer running time of 14:51 compared with the original 1973 studio recording (from (Pronounced 'Lĕh-'nérd 'Skin-'nérd)) of "Free Bird" (timed at 9:08). Rather than sing the lyrics himself, Johnny Van Zant directed the concert crowd to sing along with the music in tribute to his older brother Ronnie Van Zant.

== Track listings ==
1. "Introduction by Lacy Van Zant/Workin' for MCA" (Ed King, Ronnie Van Zant) - 6:04
2. "That Smell" (Allen Collins, Ronnie Van Zant, JoJo Billingsley) - 6:33
3. "I Know a Little" (Steve Gaines) - 4:58
4. "Comin' Home" (Allen Collins, Ronnie Van Zant) - 6:36
5. "You Got That Right" (Steve Gaines, Ronnie Van Zant) - 4:33
6. "What's Your Name?" (Gary Rossington, Ronnie Van Zant) - 3:59
7. "Gimme Back My Bullets" (Gary Rossington, Ronnie Van Zant) - 4:58
8. "Swamp Music" (Ed King, Ronnie Van Zant) - 3:51
9. "Call Me the Breeze" (J.J. Cale) - 7:29
10. "Dixie/Sweet Home Alabama" (Ed King, Gary Rossington, Ronnie Van Zant) - 8:29
11. "Free Bird" (Allen Collins, Ronnie Van Zant) - 14:51
- Tracks 1–2, 4–6, 11 recorded 11/1/1987 at the Reunion Arena in Dallas, TX
- Tracks 3, 7, 9–10 recorded 10/15/1987 at The Omni in Atlanta, GA
- Track 8 recorded 10/23/1987 at the Starwood Amphitheatre in Antioch, TN

== Personnel ==
Lynyrd Skynyrd

- Johnny Van Zant - lead vocals
- Gary Rossington - guitar
- Ed King - guitar, Yamaha DX7, backing vocals
- Randall Hall - backing vocals, guitar
- Leon Wilkeson - backing vocals, bass
- Billy Powell - piano, organ, Yamaha DX7
- Artimus Pyle - drums
- Chris Pyle - percussion

Additional musicians

- Dale Krantz Rossington - backing vocals
- Carol Bristow - backing vocals
- Allen Collins - arrangement consultant
- Ronnie Eades - Muscle Shoals Horn Section
- Don Taylor - Sax Attack Horn Section
- Lacy Van Zant - Master of Ceremonies
- Charlie Daniels - vocals ("Sweet Home Alabama"), fiddle ("Call Me The Breeze")
- Steve Morse - guitar ("Gimme Back My Bullets")
- Toy Caldwell - guitar ("Call Me The Breeze")
- Jeff Carlisi - guitar ("Call Me The Breeze")
- Donnie Van Zant - vocals ("Call Me The Breeze" and "Sweet Home Alabama")

== Chart positions ==
Chart (1988)	Peak position
US Billboard 200	68
