= Street Survivors: The True Story of the Lynyrd Skynyrd Plane Crash =

American musical survival drama film directed by Jared Cohn

- Film poster
- Directed by: Jared Cohn
- Screenplay by: Jared Cohn; Brian Perera
- Story by: Artimus Pyle
- Produced by: Brian Perera; Yvonne Perera
- Starring: Ian Shultis; Taylor Clift; Samuel Kay Forrest; Rich Dally III; Neill Byrnes; Anthony Rocco Bovo; Mark Dippolito
- Production company: Cleopatra Entertainment
- Distributed by: Cleopatra Entertainment
- Release dates: February 18, 2020 (Hollywood Reel); June 30, 2020 (United States)
- Running time: 92 minutes
- Country: United States
- Language: English

Street Survivors: The True Story of the Lynyrd Skynyrd Plane Crash is a 2020 American musical survival drama film directed by Jared Cohn and written by Cohn and Brian Perera. The film stars Ian Shultis, Taylor Clift, Samuel Kay Forrest, Rich Dally III, Neill Byrnes, Anthony Rocco Bovo and Mark Dippolito.

The film premiered at the 2020 Hollywood Reel Independent Film Festival, and released on DVD, Blu-Ray, and video on demand on June 30, 2020.

== Cast ==
- Ian Shultis as Artimus Pyle
- Taylor Clift as Ronnie Van Zant
- Samuel Kay Forrest as Steve Gaines
- Rich Dally III as Allen Collins
- Sierra Intoccio as Leslie Hawkins
- Lelia Symington as Cassie Gaines
- Chris Peritore as Ed King
- Neill Byrnes as Steven Tyler
- Kelly Lynn Reiter as Margie
- Anthony Rocco Bovo as Joe Perry
- Keith Sutliff as Everett Farley
- Hudson Long as Billy Powell
- Nick Cairo as Leon Wilkeson
- David Roy Banks
- Sean McNabb as David Krebs
- Collin Lee Ellis as Kevin Elson
- Mark Dippolito as Ron Eckerman
- Anthony Jensen as Agent Wallace
- Alyssa Talbot as Nurse
- Marley Uribe as Emma the groupie
- Bill Devlin as Hotel Manager
- Julie Zimmer as JoJo Billingsley
- Navarone Garibaldi as Gary Rossington
- Jor-el Vaasborg as Hospital Worker

== Production ==
On June 23, 2016, it was reported that Cleopatra Entertainment was producing a biopic about the rock band, Lynyrd Skynyrd, whose plane crashed on October 20, 1977, killing three band members Ronnie Van Zant (Lead Vocals), Steve Gaines (Guitar), and Cassie Gaines (Backup Vocals), Dean Kilpatrick (assistant road manager) and the two pilots, when the tour plane ran out of fuel over Mississippi. Jared Cohn was to direct the film from his own and Brian Perera's script, based on the original story about the plane crash written by one of the band members, Artimus Pyle. On April 4, 2017, lead cast was announced, including Ian Shultis as Pyle, Taylor Clift as Ronnie Van Zant, Samuel Kay Forrest as Steve Gaines, Rich Dally III as Allen Collins, and Sean McNabb. On April 23, Neill Byrnes and Anthony Rocco Bovo were cast in the film to play Steven Tyler, and Joe Perry, respectively, while the other cast included Keith Sutliff, Hudson Long as Billy Powell, and Nick Cairo as Leon Wilkeson.

Principal photography on the film began on April 24, 2017, in Los Angeles.

Heirs of Ronnie Van Zant and Steve Gaines, as well as surviving band member Gary Rossington, filed a suit against Cleopatra Entertainment to prevent the usage of the Lynyrd Skynyrd name. On August 28, 2017, a United States District Court judge issued a court injunction, blocking production of the film. On October 10, 2018, a three-judge panel of the United States Circuit Court of Appeals for the Second Circuit in Manhattan overturned the previous injunction against Street Survivors.
