= You Got That Right =

Single by Lynyrd Skynyrd

from the album Street Survivors
- Released: 1978
- Genre: Southern rock
- Length: 3:44
- Label: MCA Records
- Songwriters: Steve Gaines; Ronnie Van Zant
- Producer: Tom Dowd

Lynyrd Skynyrd singles chronology
| "What's Your Name" (1977) | "You Got That Right" (1978) | "Down South Jukin" (1978) |

"You Got That Right" is a song written by Ronnie Van Zant and Steve Gaines, who also trade off vocals on the song. It was recorded by the Southern rock band Lynyrd Skynyrd for their last studio album before the plane crash that killed both Van Zant and Gaines, Street Survivors, and released as a single in 1978. The single peaked at No. 69 on the Billboard Hot 100 during the week of April 29, 1978. According to Billboard Magazine, "You Got That Right" contains "plenty of sparkling guitar and keyboard riffs." Cash Box said that it has "tough vocals, strong sliding guitar work, boogie beat, sparkling piano licks and tight hook." Record World said that "this tight, wisp rock 'n' roll song should stand as one of Lynyrd Skynyrd's best tracks."
