= One More from the Road =

Live album by Lynyrd Skynyrd
- Released: September 13, 1976 (US); September 11, 2001 (Deluxe Edition)
- Recorded: July 7–9, 1976
- Venues: Fox Theatre, Atlanta, Georgia
- Genres: Southern rock, boogie rock, blues rock
- Length: 84:37 (original release); 150:13 (expanded and remastered edition)
- Label: MCA (US)
- Producer: Tom Dowd

Lynyrd Skynyrd chronology
Gimme Back My Bullets (1976)	One More from the Road (1976)	Street Survivors (1977)

Professional ratings
Review scores
Source	Rating
Allmusic	3/5 stars
Christgau's Record Guide	A−
Rolling Stone	(mixed)

One More from the Road (styled as One More ~~For~~ From The Road) is a live album recorded and released by Southern rock band Lynyrd Skynyrd in 1976. This was the band's first live album, and the only live album released during the band's classic period from 1970 to 1977, when their plane crashed, killing lead singer and songwriter Ronnie Van Zant, guitarist Steve Gaines, and backing singer Cassie Gaines.

The recordings were made at three concerts at the Fox Theatre in Atlanta, Georgia, in July 1976. Lynyrd Skynyrd had supported rock promoter Alex Cooley since 1974 so that the theatre could be saved from demolition. The album was released in September 1976. It was certified gold by the RIAA on October 26, 1976, platinum on December 30, 1976, and 3× platinum on July 21, 1987.

The original 14 tracks include a cover of Jimmie Rodgers' "T for Texas" and an 11:30 version of "Free Bird". The first CD release, in 1986, was a single disc omitting two tracks, "T For Texas" and "Travelin' Man", due to time constraints. The second CD release, in 1996, was a two-disc set with all 14 songs plus three bonus tracks: "Sweet Home Alabama", "Gimme Back My Bullets" and "Simple Man". The two-disc set put the tracks in the order of appearance of the original concert.

The deluxe edition, released in 2001, was remixed entirely, remastered, and, aside from the undubbed version of "Free Bird" (which was released here for the first time), contained additional performances from the Fabulous Fox Theatre in Atlanta. The overdubbed version of "Free Bird" (which was part of the original release) was moved to the bonus tracks on disc 2. The bonus tracks are also available separately on a "Rarities Edition".

The live version of "Sweet Home Alabama" from this album was used as a track on the music rhythm video games Guitar Hero World Tour and Guitar Hero On Tour: Decades.

== Track listing ==
=== Original double LP ===
==== Side one ====
1. "Workin' for MCA" (Ed King, Ronnie Van Zant) – 4:38
2. "I Ain't the One" (Gary Rossington, Van Zant) – 3:37
3. "Searching" (Allen Collins, Van Zant) – 3:51
4. "Tuesday's Gone" (Collins, Van Zant) – 7:39

==== Side two ====
1. "Saturday Night Special" (King, Van Zant) – 5:30
2. "Travelin' Man" (Van Zant, Leon Wilkeson) – 4:08
3. "Whiskey Rock-a-Roller" (King, Billy Powell, Van Zant) – 4:14
4. "Sweet Home Alabama" (King, Rossington, Van Zant) – 6:49

==== Side three ====
1. "Gimme Three Steps" (Collins, Van Zant) – 5:00
2. "Call Me the Breeze" (J.J. Cale) – 5:27
3. "T for Texas" (Jimmie Rodgers) – 8:26

==== Side four ====
1. "The Needle and the Spoon" (Collins, Van Zant) – 4:17
2. "Crossroads" (Robert Johnson) – 3:44
3. "Free Bird" (Collins, Van Zant) – 11:30

=== 25th Anniversary Deluxe Edition (2001) ===
==== Disc 1 ====
1. "Introduction by Alex Cooley/Workin' for MCA" (King, Van Zant) – 5:32 (July 7)
2. "I Ain't the One" (Rossington, Van Zant) – 3:47 (July 8)
3. "Saturday Night Special" (King, Van Zant) – 5:39 (July 8)
4. "Searching" (Collins, Van Zant) – 4:00 (July 9)
5. "Travelin' Man" (Van Zant, Wilkeson) – 4:37 (July 8)
6. "Simple Man" (Rossington, Van Zant) – 6:56 (July 7)
7. "Whiskey Rock-a-Roller" (King, Powell, Van Zant) – 4:48 (July 7)
8. "The Needle and the Spoon" (Collins, Van Zant) – 4:35 (July 8)
9. "Gimme Back My Bullets" (Rossington, Van Zant) – 4:01 (July 8)
10. "Tuesday's Gone" (Collins, Van Zant) – 8:25 (July 9)
11. "Gimme Three Steps" (Collins, Van Zant) – 5:11 (July 9)
12. "Call Me the Breeze" (Cale) – 5:51 (July 8)
13. "T For Texas (Blue Yodel #1)" (Rodgers) – 9:14 (July 8)

==== Disc 2 ====
1. "Sweet Home Alabama" (King, Rossington, Van Zant) – 7:29 (July 9)
2. "Crossroads" (Johnson) – 4:16 (July 9)
3. "Free Bird" (Collins, Van Zant) – 14:25 (July 8)
4. "Introduction by Alex Cooley/Workin' for MCA" (King, Van Zant) – 5:37 (July 8)
5. "I Ain't the One" (Rossington, Van Zant) – 3:52 (July 7)
6. "Searching" (Collins, Van Zant) – 4:13 (July 7)
7. "Gimme Three Steps" (Collins, Van Zant) – 4:42 (July 7)
8. "Call Me the Breeze" (Cale) – 5:43 (July 7)
9. "Sweet Home Alabama" (King, Rossington, Van Zant) – 7:27 (July 8)
10. "Crossroads" (Johnson) – 4:46 (July 8)
11. "Free Bird" (Collins, Van Zant) – 14:48 (July 9)

==== Notes on the bonus tracks ====
- Disc 1, Track 6 from Legend (1987)
- Disc 1, Track 9 from the Anaheim Stadium Promo Single (1977)
- Disc 2, Tracks 7–8, 10–11 from Collectybles (2000)
- Disc 2, Track 9 from the 1996 reissue of the album
- Disc 2, Tracks 4–6 are previously unreleased

== Personnel ==
- Ronnie Van Zant – lead vocals
- Steve Gaines – guitar, vocals
- Allen Collins – guitar
- Gary Rossington – guitar
- Leon Wilkeson – bass, vocals
- Artimus Pyle – drums
- Billy Powell – keyboards
- JoJo Billingsley, Cassie Gaines, Leslie Hawkins (the Honkettes) – backing vocals
- Sam McPherson – harmonica

== Charts ==
Chart (1976)	Peak position
Australian Albums (Kent Music Report)	79
Canada Top Albums/CDs (RPM)	49
UK Albums (Official Charts)	17
US Billboard 200	9

== Certifications ==
Region	Certification	Certified units/sales
Canada (Music Canada)	Gold	50,000^{^}
United Kingdom (BPI)	Silver	60,000^{^}
United States (RIAA)	3× Platinum	1,500,000^{^}
^{^} Shipments figures based on certification alone.
