= One in the Sun =

Studio album by Steve Gaines
- Released: 1988
- Recorded: 1975
- Genre: Southern rock
- Length: 34:49
- Label: MCA
- Producer: John Ryan, Sam Whiteside, Steve Gaines

Professional ratings
Review scores
Source	Rating
AllMusic	3.5/5 stars

One in the Sun is credited as the only solo album by Steve Gaines, best known as a guitarist for Lynyrd Skynyrd. It was recorded with Crawdad bandmates at Leon Russell's Church Studio in Tulsa, Oklahoma, and at Capricorn studios in Macon, Georgia, in 1975. It was released in 1988 by MCA Records, 11 years after Gaines' death in the 1977 Lynyrd Skynyrd plane crash. Crawdad had been a working band for some time and all the material had been performed onstage prior to being recorded. Gaines had previously worked with all the members of Crawdad in other bands, some of which included Magic Kitchen, Man Alive, and Detroit.

== Track listing ==
All songs written by Gaines, except where noted.

1. "Give It to Get It" – 4:45
2. "It's Alright" (Curtis Mayfield) – 3:04
3. "Blackjack Davey" (Traditional, arr. Taj Mahal) – 2:40
4. "On the Road" (John Moss) – 2:47
5. "One in the Sun" – 4:49
6. "Talkin' About Love" (Gaines, Moss) – 4:07
7. "Nothin' Is New" – 2:41
8. "Take My Time" – 4:28
9. "Summertime's Here" – 5:28

== Personnel ==
Crawdad

- Steve Gaines – lead vocals, lead guitar, backing vocals
- John 'Moose' Moss – guitar, backing vocals, lead vocal on "On the Road"
- Terry Emery – keyboards
- John Seaberg – bass, backing vocals, tuba on "Blackjack Davey"
- Ron 'Brooksie' Brooks – drums, percussion

Additional personnel

- Bruce Blain – keyboards, programming
- Mark Dearnley – remixing
- Greg Fulginiti – mastering
- Tommy Lokey – horn
- Charles 'Chip' Miller – congas
- John Ryan – producer
- Sam Whiteside – producer
