= Gimme Back My Bullets =

Studio album by Lynyrd Skynyrd
- Released: February 2, 1976
- Recorded: September 7–9 (tracks 2, 4, 8) and November 28–30, 1975
- Studios: Record Plant, Los Angeles (tracks 2, 4, 8) and Capricorn Studios, Macon, Georgia
- Genres: Southern rock; hard rock
- Length: 35:16
- Label: MCA
- Producer: Tom Dowd

Lynyrd Skynyrd chronology
Nuthin' Fancy (1975)	Gimme Back My Bullets (1976)	One More from the Road (1976)

Singles from Gimme Back My Bullets
- 1. "Double Trouble" Released: February 2, 1976; 2. "Gimme Back My Bullets" Released: 1976

Professional ratings
Review scores
Source	Rating
AllMusic	3/5 stars
Christgau's Record Guide	B+
Rolling Stone	(mixed)

Gimme Back My Bullets is the fourth studio album by American Southern rock band Lynyrd Skynyrd, released on February 2, 1976. Produced by Tom Dowd, it reached number 20 on the U.S. albums chart and was certified gold on January 20, 1981, by the RIAA.

== Critical reception ==
Record World said the title track had "a sinewy, guitar-heavy number sound the group is most comfortable with," and said that "the beat is reminiscent of Bad Company and rocks with a stormy aggression."

Robert Christgau, who gave the album a positive review, stated: "Ronnie Van Zant may intend those bullets for 'pencil pushers' (which means not only me but you, I'll bet) but that's no reason to shoot him down. In fact, it's just the opposite—his attraction has always been the way he gets his unreconstructed say. Unfortunately, the music could use some Yankee calculation—from Al Kooper of Forest Hills, who I figure was good for two hooks per album, and Ed King of New Jersey, the guitarist turned born-againer whose guitar fills carried a lot more zing than three doodooing Honnicutts."

== Track listing ==
Side one
No.	Title	Writer(s)	Length
1.	"Gimme Back My Bullets"	Gary Rossington; Ronnie Van Zant	3:28
2.	"Every Mother's Son"	Allen Collins; Van Zant	4:56
3.	"Trust"	Collins; Rossington; Van Zant	4:25
4.	"(I Got the) Same Old Blues"	J. J. Cale	4:08

Side two
No.	Title	Writer(s)	Length
1.	"Double Trouble"	Collins; Van Zant	2:49
2.	"Roll Gypsy Roll"	Collins; Rossington; Van Zant	2:50
3.	"Searching"	Collins; Van Zant	3:17
4.	"Cry for the Bad Man"	Rossington; Collins; Van Zant	4:48
5.	"All I Can Do Is Write About It"	Collins; Van Zant	4:16

- Sides one and two were combined as tracks 1–9 on CD reissues.

1999 CD reissue bonus tracks
No.	Title	Writer(s)	Length
10.	"Gimme Back My Bullets" (Live at the Winterland in San Francisco, CA, March 7, 1976)	Rossington; Van Zant	4:18
11.	"Cry for the Bad Man" (Live at the Winterland in San Francisco, CA, March 7, 1976)	Collins; Rossington; Van Zant	5:35

- Tracks 10 and 11 are previously unreleased

2006 CD deluxe edition bonus tracks
No.	Title	Writer(s)	Length
10.	"Double Trouble" (Live at the Capitol Theatre in Cardiff, Wales, November 4, 1975)	Collins; Van Zant	3:13
11.	"I Got the Same Old Blues" (Live at the Capitol Theatre in Cardiff, Wales, November 4, 1975)	Cale	4:13
12.	"Gimme Back My Bullets" (Live at the Winterland in San Francisco, CA, March 7, 1976)	Rossington; Van Zant	4:18
13.	"Cry for the Bad Man" (Live at the Winterland in San Francisco, CA, March 7, 1976)	Collins; Rossington; Van Zant	5:35
14.	"All I Can Do Is Write About It" (Acoustic Version)	Collins; Van Zant	4:24
15.	"Double Trouble" (Alternate Version)	Collins; Van Zant	2:51

- Tracks 10 and 14 originally released on the Lynyrd Skynyrd (Box Set) (1991)
- Track 15 originally released on Skynyrd's Innyrds (1989)
- Track 11 is previously unreleased

2006 deluxe edition bonus DVD
No.	Title	Writer(s)	Length
1.	"Double Trouble"	Collins; Van Zant
2.	"I Ain't the One"	Rossington; Van Zant
3.	"Call Me the Breeze"	Cale
4.	"I Got the Same Old Blues"	Cale
5.	"Every Mother's Son"	Allen Collins; Van Zant
6.	"Sweet Home Alabama"	Ed King; Rossington; Van Zant
7.	"Free Bird"	Collins; Van Zant

- All tracks recorded live for The Old Grey Whistle Test on BBC television on November 11, 1975.

== Personnel ==
Lynyrd Skynyrd

- Ronnie Van Zant – lead vocals
- Gary Rossington – guitars
- Allen Collins – guitars
- Leon Wilkeson – bass, background vocals
- Artimus Pyle – drums, percussion
- Billy Powell – keyboards

Additional personnel

- The Honeycuts – background vocals ("Double Trouble", "Cry for the Bad Man")
- The Honkettes – background vocals (on bonus live tracks)
- Lee Freeman – harp ("I Got the Same Old Blues")
- Barry Lee Harwood – dobro, mandolin ("All I Can Do Is Write About It")

== Charts ==
Chart (1976)	Peak position
Canada Top Albums/CDs (RPM)	73
Dutch Albums (Album Top 100)	20
Swedish Albums (Sverigetopplistan)	50
UK Albums (Official Charts)	34
US Billboard 200	20

== Certifications ==
Region	Certification	Certified units/sales
United States (RIAA)	Gold	500,000^{^}
^{^} Shipments figures based on certification alone.
