= Legend (Lynyrd Skynyrd album) =

Compilation album by Lynyrd Skynyrd
- Released: October 5, 1987
- Genre: Southern rock
- Length: 45:33
- Label: MCA
- Producer: Al Kooper, Tom Dowd, John Ryan

Lynyrd Skynyrd chronology
Best of the Rest (1982)	Legend (1987)	Southern by the Grace of God (1988)

Professional ratings
Review scores
Source	Rating
Allmusic	2/5 stars
Robert Christgau	B+
New Musical Express	3/10
Rolling Stone	4/5 stars

Legend is a posthumous compilation album by American Southern rock band Lynyrd Skynyrd that was released in 1987. It contains previously unreleased demos from the albums before the 1977 plane crash as well as non-LP B-sides. Since Legend was released, most of the tracks have also been included on other albums.

The album was certified Gold on July 27, 2001 by the RIAA. "Truck Drivin' Man" spent seven weeks on the Billboard Album Rock Tracks chart, peaking at number 12.

== Recording ==
"Truck Drivin' Man" is a "honky tonk strut" written by Edward King and Ronnie Van Zant. It was released as the B-side to the single "When You Got Good Friends" in November 1987. The song was subsequently included on Skynyrd's Innyrds in 1989 and in the 1991 Lynyrd Skynyrd box set.

== Track listing ==
1. "Georgia Peaches" (Steve Gaines, Ronnie Van Zant) - 3:12
2. "When You Got Good Friends" (Allen Collins, Van Zant) - 3:03
3. "Sweet Little Missy" (Gary Rossington, Van Zant) - 5:10
4. "Four Walls of Raiford" (Jeff Carlisi, Van Zant) - 4:15
5. "Simple Man" (Live) (Gary Rossington, Van Zant) - 6:35
6. "Truck Drivin' Man" (Ed King, Van Zant) - 5:17
7. "One in the Sun" (Gaines) - 5:19
8. "Mr. Banker" (King, Rossington, Van Zant) - 5:18
9. "Take Your Time" (King, Van Zant) - 7:24
- Track 5 recorded on 7/7/1976 at the Fox Theatre in Atlanta, Georgia

== Personnel ==
- Ronnie Van Zant – lead vocals
- Allen Collins – guitar
- Gary Rossington – guitar
- Billy Powell – keyboards
- Leon Wilkeson – bass
- Artimus Pyle – drums
- Steve Gaines – guitar
- Ed King – guitar
- Bob Burns – drums (Tracks 6, 8 & 9)
- Larry Junstrom – bass (Track 2)
- Don Barnes - guitar (Track 2)
- Steve Brookins - drums (Track 2)
- Jeff Carlisi - guitar (Track 4)
- Ron Brooks - drums (Track 7)

== Certifications ==
Region	Certification	Certified units/sales
United States (RIAA)	Gold	500,000^{^}
^{^} Shipments figures based on certification alone.

== Charts ==
"Truck Drivin' Man"

Chart (1987)	Peak position
US Billboard Album Rock Tracks	12

== In popular culture ==
- In 2005, "Truck Drivin' Man" was used during a (pickup) truck driving scene in an episode of King of the Hill.
