= Saturday Night Special (Lynyrd Skynyrd song) =

Single by Lynyrd Skynyrd

from the album Nuthin' Fancy
- B-side: "Made in the Shade"
- Released: May 19, 1975
- Recorded: August 1974
- Genre: Southern rock; hard rock; heavy metal
- Length: 5:09
- Label: MCA
- Songwriters: Ed King, Ronnie Van Zant
- Producer: Al Kooper

Lynyrd Skynyrd singles chronology
"Free Bird" (1974)	"Saturday Night Special" (1975)	"Double Trouble" (1976)

"Saturday Night Special" is a song by American rock band Lynyrd Skynyrd. It is the opening track on their album Nuthin' Fancy. The song addresses fatal tragedies involving guns.

== Content ==
Its lyrics refer to the cheap handguns popularly associated with the term Saturday night special, and associates them with impulsive violence. Each of the three verses presents a different example: a man shooting another man in bed with his cheating wife; a poker player killing his friend after accusing him of cheating; and accidentally shooting oneself while intoxicated. Notably, it argues that they "[a]in't good for nothin' / But put a man six feet in a hole."

== Reception ==
Billboard called the song "ominous sounding", and said that the lyrics contain "interesting social commentary". Cash Box said it had a "stinging, vital" and "brash and bawdy sound manifested in the sneering vocals of Ronnie Van Zant and the razor sharp interplay between three guitars."

== Personnel ==
Personnel taken from Nuthin' Fancy liner notes.

Lynyrd Skynyrd

- Ronnie Van Zant – lead vocals
- Ed King – guitars
- Allen Collins – guitars
- Gary Rossington – guitars
- Leon Wilkeson – bass guitar, backing vocals
- Billy Powell – keyboards
- Artimus Pyle – drums, percussion

Additional personnel

- Al Kooper – Moog synthesizers

== Chart performance ==
Chart (1975)	Peak position
Canada RPM Top Singles	63
U.S. Billboard Hot 100	27

== Cover versions ==
- Country singer Waylon Jennings recorded the song in the 1970s and is set to be released on the posthumous album Diamonds in 2026 as the album's 2nd track.
- A cover version of this song was performed and recorded by the American heavy metal band Armored Saint on their 1987 album Raising Fear.
- Punk/thrash band The Accüsed covered this song on the 1991 EP Straight Razor.
- In 1994, a cover version was recorded by country music band McBride & the Ride, as part of a compilation titled Skynyrd Frynds, which featured several country acts performing covers of Skynyrd songs.
- In 2002, rock band Great White recorded a version on their cover album, Recover.
- In 2007, rock band Tesla recorded a cover version on their album, Real to Reel, Vol. 2.

== In popular culture ==
- "Saturday Night Special" is on the soundtrack of the 1978 movie Blue Collar, starring Richard Pryor, Yaphet Kotto and Harvey Keitel.
- The song is featured in a season 2 episode of the American television show Supernatural titled "What Is and What Should Never Be".
- The song is also featured in the scenes involving the police in both the original The Longest Yard from 1974 and the remake from 2005. The appearance in the original film is notable since it was added to the film just after being recorded and nine months before the single was released.
- The song is played in season 3 episode 5 of The Walking Dead, during the staged fight scene.
- The song is featured in the video game Grand Theft Auto IV: The Lost and Damned.
- The song is featured in James Hardy's part in Fallen Footwear's "Ride the Sky" (2008).
- A live version is on the Lynyrd Skynyrd album Live at Winterland, which was released in 2009.
- The song was recorded at Studio One in Doraville, Georgia. Engineered by Rodney Mills, who engineered albums by The Atlanta Rhythm Section.
- The song was made available for download on November 30, 2010, for use in the Rock Band 3 music video game in both Basic rhythm, and PRO mode which allows use of a real guitar / bass guitar, and MIDI compatible electronic drum kits / keyboards in addition to vocals.
