= Artimus Pyle =

American drummer (born 1948)

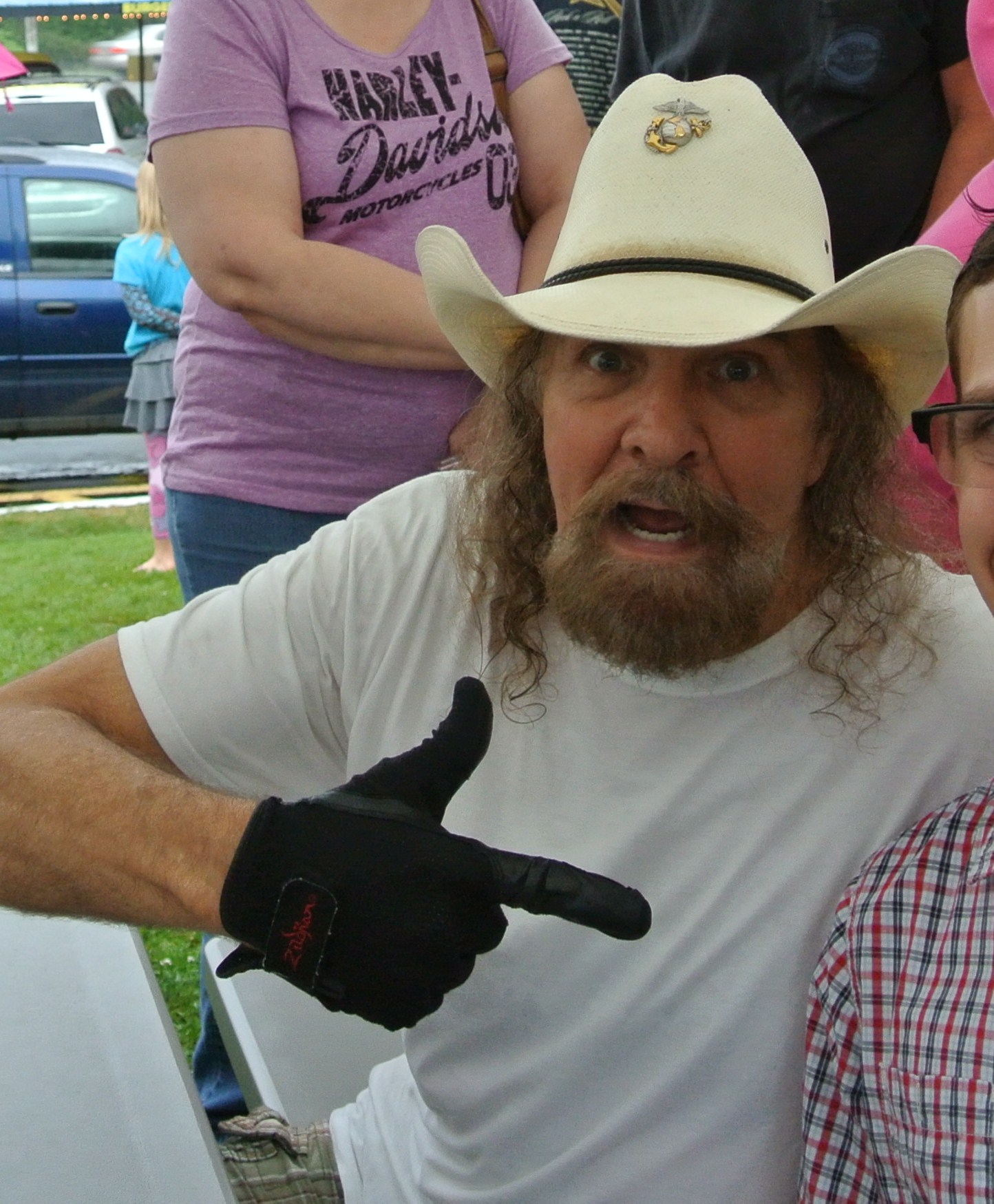
- Pyle in 2011

Background information
- Born: Thomas Delmer Pyle; July 15, 1948 (age 78); Louisville, Kentucky, U.S.
- Genre: Southern rock
- Occupation: Drummer
- Years active: 1974–present
- Labels: Cleopatra MCA, Atlantic

Thomas Delmer "Artimus" Pyle (born July 15, 1948) is an American musician who played drums with the Southern rock band Lynyrd Skynyrd from 1974 to 1977 and from 1987 to 1991. He and his bandmates were inducted into the Rock and Roll Hall of Fame in 2006.

== Biography ==
=== Early life ===
Pyle was born in Louisville, Kentucky, the son of homemaker Mildred "Midge" Pyle (née Williams; 1925–2008) and Clarence "Del" Pyle (1921–1971), a construction superintendent who was awarded a Purple Heart after being shot in the leg while serving with the United States Marine Corps in the South Pacific during World War II.

Pyle himself enlisted in the Marines in 1968. He was named platoon and series honorman and promoted to private first class following completion of boot camp in San Diego. Eyeing a career in civil aviation, Pyle worked as an avionics mechanic at various military bases, including Millington, Tennessee, and Beaufort, South Carolina, ultimately rising to the rank of sergeant. He was honorably discharged in 1971.

=== Lynyrd Skynyrd ===
After playing with Thickwood Lick in Spartanburg, South Carolina, Pyle joined Lynyrd Skynyrd in 1975. He initially played alongside, and then replaced, original drummer Bob Burns. He made his recording debut in August, 1974 on "Saturday Night Special", which became the first single from the band's third album, Nuthin' Fancy. In addition to Nuthin' Fancy, Pyle also played on the albums Gimme Back My Bullets, One More from the Road, Street Survivors, Legend, Southern by the Grace of God and Lynyrd Skynyrd 1991.

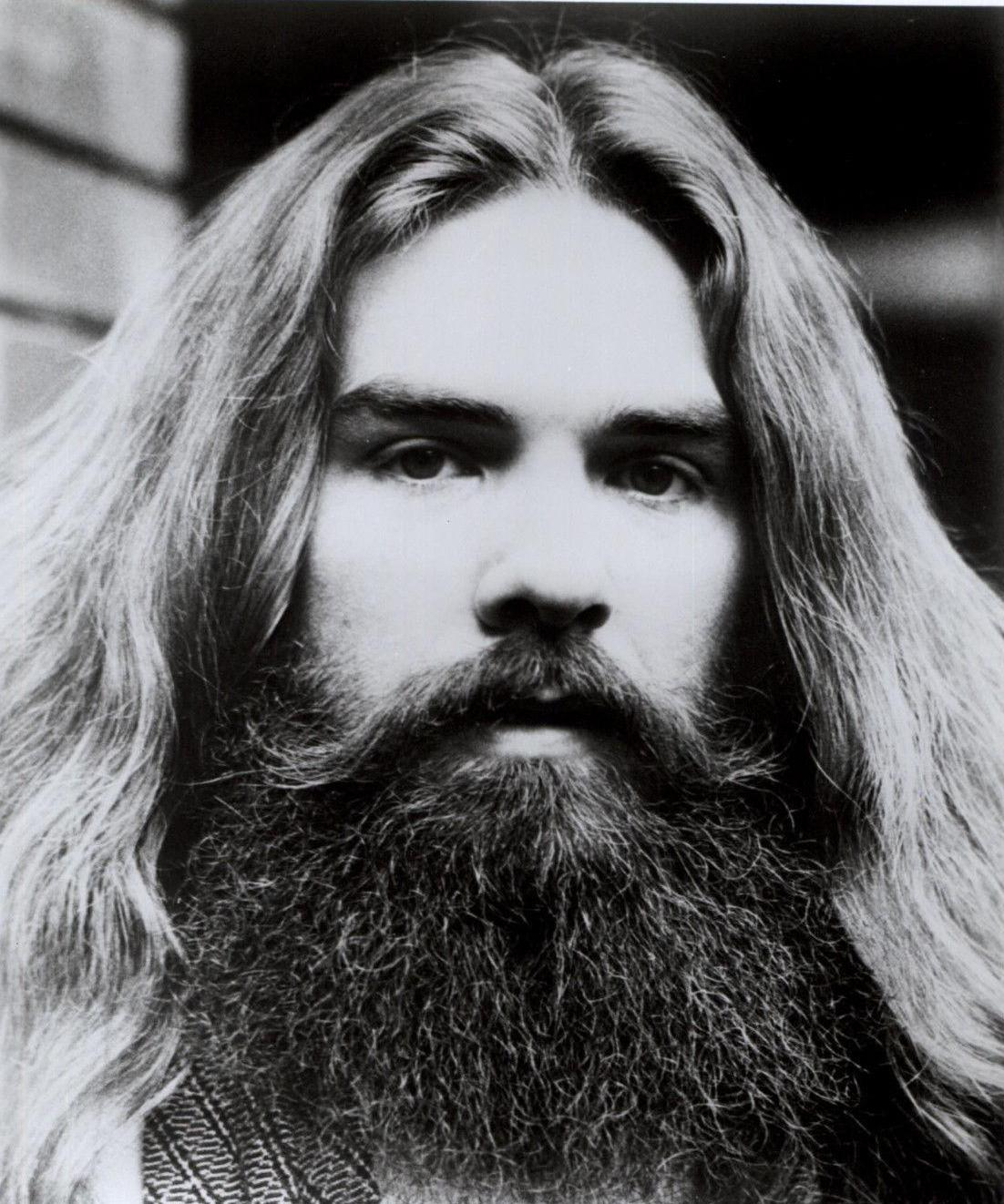
Pyle in the mid-1970s

He survived the 1977 plane crash that killed lead vocalist and songwriter Ronnie Van Zant, guitarist Steve Gaines, backing vocalist Cassie Gaines, assistant Road Manager Dean Kilpatrick, and the two pilots. Pyle suffered torn chest cartilage but managed to stumble several hundred yards through a creek and a field to a farmhouse to get help. The appearance of Pyle alarmed the 21-year-old farmer Johnny Mote, who mistook him for an escaped convict and fired a warning shot over Pyle's head. Pyle would later joke he was hit in the shoulder, but his other accounts differ. Mote also refutes the claim of Pyle being shot, when interviewed at the crash scene for VH1's 2002 documentary Lynyrd Skynyrd's Uncivil War. Mote realized the situation when Pyle shouted that there had been a plane crash, helped Pyle inside his house and was part of the initial rescue party. About the same time local rescuers, who had just completed a Civil Defense drill, converged on the scene and Pyle directed them to the crash site where the dead and the injured were located.

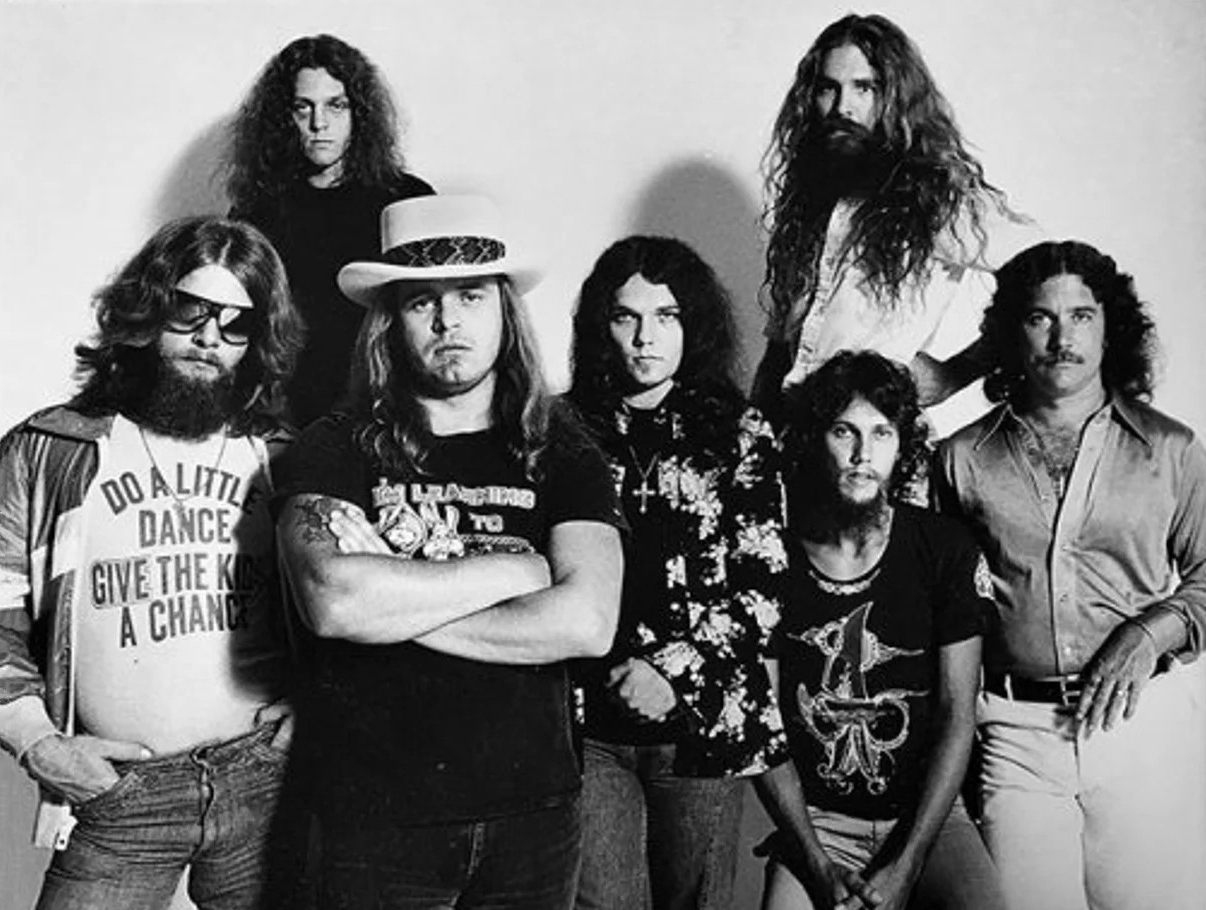
Lynyrd Skynyrd in 1977

He is the last surviving band member from the plane crash.

=== After the crash ===
On January 13, 1979, the surviving members of Lynyrd Skynyrd reunited for Charlie Daniels' fifth annual Volunteer Jam concert in Nashville. They played an instrumental version of "Free Bird". Bassist Leon Wilkeson watched from the wings because he was still unable to play.

Following the crash, Pyle spent three years living in Jerusalem, studying at the Diaspora Yeshiva. The yeshiva was known for attracting spiritual seekers from the hippie and counterculture movements, whether they were Jewish or not. Many of the students were professional or semi-professional musicians. Pyle played with the house band, the Diaspora Yeshiva Band, during informal gatherings, and formed a band called Remez with fellow student Rabbi Karmi Ingber. When he departed, he donated his drum kit to the yeshiva. Pyle reflected on these years in the song "I Live in Jerusalem" on a 2007 solo album. In an interview with the Lucas H. Gordon Show posted online in 2013, Pyle is asked why he went to Israel for three years, to which he replied, "I was trying to become a better human being."

Pyle and several other bandmates also worked with a short-lived trio called Alias on their album Contraband. The group consisted of Dorman Cogburn, a childhood friend of Lynyrd Skynyrd guitarist Gary Rossington; vocalist Jimmy Dougherty, who went on to sing on the Allen Collins Band's solo album, and former Skynyrd backing vocalist JoJo Billingsley. These collaborations set in motion the formation of the Rossington Collins Band, with all the survivors plus Dale Krantz on lead vocals and Barry Lee Harwood on guitar. Pyle was forced to drop out after breaking his leg in 21 places following a collision with a drunk driver. Pyle was replaced by Derek Hess. In 1982, Pyle began recording and touring with the Artimus Pyle Band (A.P.B.), including Darryl Otis Smith, John Boerstler, Steve Brewington, and Steve Lockhart. A.P.B.'s albums include A.P.B. (1981), Nightcaller (1983) and Live from Planet Earth (2000).

Pyle took part in the Skynyrd Tribute tour and joined the reformed Lynyrd Skynyrd in recording Lynyrd Skynyrd 1991 before departing the band during a show in Toronto on August 2, 1991. In a radio interview with Rick Lewis and Michael Floorwax on The FOX in Denver, Colorado, on the 20th anniversary of the crash, Pyle said, "I left the band in 1991 basically because there was a problem with drugs and alcohol and I felt as though we should have put all that stuff behind us years and years ago." Both Pyle and his predecessor, Bob Burns, performed with the current version of Lynyrd Skynyrd following the band's induction into the Rock and Roll Hall of Fame in 2006.

Pyle declined to join a 2018 Lynyrd Skynyrd Farewell Tour but is still a working musician and continues to tour with The Artimus Pyle Band. He also wrote the film Street Survivors: The True Story of the Lynyrd Skynyrd Plane Crash which premiered in 2020, after a legal dispute which included a 2017 injunction attempting to stop production.

== Musicianship ==
=== Drums ===
Pyle learned his craft by listening to the radio and copying drummers such as Ringo Starr, Buddy Rich, Gene Krupa, and Joe Morello of the Dave Brubeck Quartet. He received his first set of drums when he was approximately the age of 12, a red sparkle Slingerland kit consisting of one bass drum, one rack tom, one floor tom, and a snare drum. He has described his style as "technical."

During his tenure with Lynyrd Skynyrd, he initially played a chrome-plated Jazz Rock Slingerland kit that he had purchased with his Marines discharge check. It featured two rack toms (14 and 15 inches); two floor toms (16 and 18 inches); two bass drums (24 inches); and a Rogers Dynasonic snare drum (14 x 6.5 inches). Later, the Slingerland Drum Company built him a set of blonde-maple drums with red mahogany rims. This kit consisted of four tom-toms up, two toms on the floor, with a double bass drum. He specified no resonant heads on the bottom for better microphone placement, although it made drum-tuning more of a challenge. His cowbell was an actual cowbell.

=== Recent activities ===
Pyle plays in several bands in the Asheville, North Carolina, area. He also tours the United States with a new incarnation of the Artimus Pyle Band that plays Lynyrd Skynyrd tunes note-for-note faithful to the recorded versions. Former Lynyrd Skynyrd member Ed King has instructed Pyle's bandmates on the original chords and tunings.

In 2004, Pyle recorded four studio tracks on Southern Rock band Rambler's album First Things First with vocalist Pat Terranova, guitarist Mitch Farber, bassist Willy Lussier and acoustic guitarist and vocalist Rikki Cuccia. In 2007, he toured with the band Deep South, whose lineup also included Wet Willie vocalist Jimmy Hall and former Atlanta Rhythm Section members Robert Nix and Dean Daughtry.

In 2005, Pyle joined The Saturday Night Special Band, a hybrid Lynyrd Skynyrd group with 4 original members of Lynyrd Skynyrd including, Ed King, JoJo Billingsley and Leslie Hawkins. The band was put together by Ed King's friend and guitarist Mark Basile that also featured several other musician from New York. The band played several shows, raising awareness to UNOS, an Organ Donor Charitable Organization.

In 2007, Pyle released the album Artimus Venomus on Storm Dog Records Group/Cleopatra Records. Several of the tunes referenced his personal tribulations, including "Blood Sucking Weasel Attorneys" and "Dead Rock Stars, Widows, Gigolos, Pocket Money." Guests included Ed King and former Lynyrd Skynyrd backing singers Jo Jo Billingsley and Leslie Hawkins. In 2014, Pyle was a guest performer on Eli Cook's album, Primitive Son.

In June 2017, Pyle was sued by Ronnie Van Zant's widow, Judy Van Zant, Gary Rossington, current Lynyrd Skynyrd singer Johnny Van Zant, and the representatives and heirs of Allen Collins and Steve Gaines. They claimed his involvement in a low-budget feature film about the band's plane crash infringed upon a consent decree the band agreed to in 1988. In October 2017, Pyle was going to publish his memoir, Street Survivor: Keeping the Beat in Lynyrd Skynyrd, co-written with journalist Dean Goodman, through Backbeat Books/Hal Leonard. However, the lawsuit kept the book from being published indefinitely.

== Personal life ==
Pyle lives in Morganton, North Carolina. He has three sons, two daughters, two grandchildren and has been married twice. His interests include cars, motorbikes, horses and watching reruns of The Andy Griffith Show and Gomer Pyle. He is also a vegetarian.

In 1993, Pyle was charged with attempted capital sexual battery and lewd assault on two girls. He denied the charges, claiming the girls had been abused by people connected to babysitters in a Jacksonville mobile home park who held a grudge against him. Moreover, he claimed the allegations were an attempt to extort money from the Lynyrd Skynyrd organization. Weeks before the trial was due to start in January 1994, Pyle pleaded no contest rather than risk a mandatory sentence of life imprisonment if found guilty in a jury trial. He was sentenced to probation and required to register as a sex offender. In 2007, Pyle was charged with failure to register as a sex offender in St. Johns County, Florida. He rejected a plea bargain offer and was acquitted by a jury in 2009.

== In popular culture ==
- The sludge metal band Artimus Pyledriver based its name on Pyle.

== Discography ==
=== Lynyrd Skynyrd ===
- Nuthin' Fancy (1975)
- Gimme Back My Bullets (1976)
- One More from the Road (1976)
- Street Survivors (1977)
- Legend (1987)
- Southern by the Grace of God (1988)

=== Alias ===
- Contraband (1979)

=== Artimus Pyle Band ===
- A.P.B. (1981)
- Nightcaller (1983)
- Live from Planet Earth (2000)
- Artimus Venomus (2007)
- Anthems-Honoring The Music of Lynyrd Skynyrd (2024)

== See also ==
- List of people from the Louisville metropolitan area
