= Double Trouble (Lynyrd Skynyrd song) =

Single by Lynyrd Skynyrd

from the album Gimme Back My Bullets
- Released: 1976
- Genre: Southern rock
- Length: 2:51
- Label: MCA Records
- Songwriter(s): Ronnie Van Zant; Allen Collins
- Producer(s): Tom Dowd

Lynyrd Skynyrd singles chronology
"Made in the Shade" (1975)	"Double Trouble" (1976)	"Roll Gypsy Roll" (1976)

"Double Trouble" is a song by American rock band Lynyrd Skynyrd, written by Ronnie Van Zant and Allen Collins, which was recorded in 1975. It appears on the band fourth album, Gimme Back My Bullets, and was released as a single in the United States. It peaked at number 80 on the Billboard Hot 100 and at number 86 on the Cash Box Top 100 Singles.

== Content ==
The song features Ronnie Van Zant singing about how he is a troublemaker. Lyrics include "Double Trouble, is what my friends all call me". According to the book Whiskey Bottles and Brand New Cars: The Fast Life and Sudden Death of Lynyrd Skynyrd by Mark Ribowsky, the genesis for the song came from a time when Gary Rossington was in jail with Van Zant and he asked him how many times he'd been arrested, to which Van Zant answered, "11." Rossington replied, "Man, Ronnie, you're just double trouble." Also according to Ribowsky, the band originally recorded under a record label called "Double T Productions" which stood for "Double Trouble." The song also features backup vocals from The Honkettes.

Record World said that "The uptempo bluesy feel has distinct commercial appeal that could catch on big."
