= Street Survivors =

Studio album by Lynyrd Skynyrd
- Released: October 17, 1977
- Recorded: Criteria Studios, Miami, Florida, April 1977; Studio One, Doraville, Georgia, July–August 1977; Muscle Shoals Sound Studios, Muscle Shoals, Alabama
- Genres: Southern rock, boogie rock
- Length: 35:26
- Label: MCA
- Producers: Tom Dowd; Jimmy Johnson & Tim Smith (track 3)

Lynyrd Skynyrd chronology
One More from the Road (1976)	Street Survivors (1977)	Skynyrd's First and... Last (1978)

Alternate cover
- Cover image used following the plane crash

Singles from Street Survivors
- 1. "What's Your Name" Released: November 1977; 2. "You Got That Right" Released: 1978

Street Survivors is the fifth studio album by the Southern rock band Lynyrd Skynyrd, released on October 17, 1977. The LP is the last Skynyrd album recorded by original members Ronnie Van Zant and Allen Collins, and is the sole Skynyrd studio recording by guitarist Steve Gaines.

Three days after the album's release, the band's chartered airplane crashed en route to Baton Rouge, Louisiana, killing the pilot, co-pilot, the group's assistant road-manager and three band members (Van Zant, Gaines, and backup singer Cassie Gaines), and severely injuring most who survived the crash. The cover art for Street Survivors was modified after the airplane crash, as the original art showing the band standing before flaming buildings was deemed inappropriate.

The album was an instant success, achieving gold certification just 10 days after its release. It would later go double platinum. The album performed well on the charts, peaking at No. 5 (the band's highest-charting album), as did the singles "What's Your Name" and "You Got That Right", the former a top-20 hit on the singles chart.

== Background ==
Street Survivors was recorded twice, once with Tom Dowd at the helm at Criteria Studios in Miami, Florida, and then at Studio One in Doraville, Georgia, five months later with uncredited co-producers Kevin Elson and Rodney Mills. The Doraville recording was used for the initial release of the album. On March 4, 2008, a remastered version of the album, Street Survivors: Deluxe Edition, was released with these alternate versions of most of the songs as well as five live tracks. Differences are minor on some songs, with the major difference being a much slower and extended earlier version of "That Smell". Also included are two songs recorded for, but not included on the original album, "Georgia Peaches" and "Sweet Little Missy", with the latter being included twice, in demo and final form. Also included is a version of "Honky Tonk Night Time Man", with Ronnie's alternate autobiographical vocal take, entitled "Jacksonville Kid", which is believed to be the last vocal take he ever recorded in a studio.

The song "One More Time" was added to the album, presumably after it was decided to drop one of the two tracks above. However, this song is the original recording from their 1971 Muscle Shoals demo; it was not re-recorded for this album. Hence it features Greg Walker, Rickey Medlocke, and Ed King in place of Leon Wilkeson, Artimus Pyle, and Steve Gaines.

Street Survivors was a showcase for guitarist/vocalist Steve Gaines, who had joined the band just a year earlier on the recommendation of his sister Cassie. Publicly and privately, Ronnie Van Zant marveled at the multiple talents of Skynyrd's newest member, claiming that the band would "all be in his shadow one day". Gaines' contributions included his co-lead vocal with Van Zant on the co-written "You Got That Right" and the guitar boogie "I Know a Little", which Gaines had written before he joined Skynyrd. So confident was Skynyrd's leader of Gaines' abilities, that the album (and some concerts) featured Gaines delivering his self-penned blues "Ain't No Good Life" – one of the few songs in the first incarnation Skynyrd catalog to feature a lead vocalist other than Van Zant. The album also included the hit single "What's Your Name" and the ominous "That Smell" – a cautionary tale about drug abuse that seemed to be aimed at fellow band members (both Collins and Gary Rossington had serious car accidents which slowed the recording of the album).

=== Plane crash ===
On October 20, 1977, only three days after the release of Street Survivors, and five shows into their most successful headlining tour to date, Lynyrd Skynyrd's chartered Convair CV-300 ran out of fuel near the end of their flight from Greenville, South Carolina, where they had just performed at the Greenville Memorial Auditorium, to LSU in Baton Rouge, Louisiana. Though the pilots attempted an emergency landing on a small airstrip, the plane crashed in a forest five miles (8 km) northeast of Gillsburg, Mississippi. Ronnie Van Zant, Steve Gaines, Cassie Gaines, assistant road manager Dean Kilpatrick, pilot Walter McCreary, and co-pilot William Gray, were killed on impact. The other band members (Collins, Rossington, Wilkeson, Powell, Pyle, and Hawkins), tour manager Ron Eckerman, and road crew survived, but suffered serious injuries.

Following the crash and the ensuing press, Street Survivors became the band's second platinum album and reached No. 5 on the U.S. album chart. The single "What's Your Name" reached No. 13 on the single airplay charts in January 1978.

The original cover sleeve for Street Survivors had featured David Alexander's photograph of the band standing on a city street with all its buildings engulfed in flames, some near the center nearly obscuring Steve Gaines's face. After the plane crash, this cover became highly controversial. Out of respect for the deceased (and at the request of Teresa Gaines, Steve's widow), MCA Records withdrew the original cover and replaced it with a similar image of the band against a simple black background, which was on the back cover of the original sleeve. An urban legend has long claimed that only those band members touched by flame in the photograph were killed in the crash, but this is not true (flame appears to touch nearly all band members). The original "flames" cover was restored for the Deluxe Edition.

== Critical reception ==
Professional ratings
Review scores
Source	Rating
AllMusic	4.5/5 stars
Christgau's Record Guide	A
The Daily Vault	A
Rolling Stone	3.5/5 stars

Robert Christgau stated: "Some rock deaths are irrelevant, while others make a kind of sense because the artists involved so obviously long to transcend (or escape) their own mortality. But for Ronnie Van Zant, life and mortality were the same thing--there was no way to embrace one without at least keeping company with the other. So it makes sense that 'That Smell' is the smell of death, or that in 'You Got That Right' Van Zant boasts that he'll never be found in an old folks' home. As with too many LPs by good road bands, each side here begins with two strong cuts and then winds down. The difference is that the two strong cuts are very strong and the weak ones gain presence with each listen. I'm not just being sentimental. I know road bands never make their best album the sixth time out, and I know Van Zant had his limits. But I mourn him not least because I suspect that he had more good music left in him than Bing and Elvis put together."

== Track listing ==
Side one
No.	Title	Writer(s)	Length
1.	"What's Your Name"	Gary Rossington, Ronnie Van Zant	3:30
2.	"That Smell"	Allen Collins, Van Zant	5:48
3.	"One More Time"	Rossington, Van Zant	5:03
4.	"I Know a Little"	Steve Gaines	3:26

Side two
No.	Title	Writer(s)	Length
1.	"You Got That Right"	Gaines, Van Zant	3:44
2.	"I Never Dreamed"	Gaines, Van Zant	5:21
3.	"Honky Tonk Night Time Man"	Merle Haggard	3:59
4.	"Ain't No Good Life"	Gaines	4:36
Total length:			35:26

2001 CD reissue bonus tracks
No.	Title	Writer(s)	Length
9.	"Georgia Peaches" (from Legend (1987))	Gaines, Van Zant	3:15
10.	"Sweet Little Missy" (from Legend)	Rossington, Van Zant	5:10
11.	"You Got That Right" (alternate; previously unreleased)	Gaines, Van Zant	3:26
12.	"I Never Dreamed" (alternate; previously unreleased)	Gaines, Van Zant	4:55
13.	"Jacksonville Kid" (from Collectybles (2000))	Haggard, Van Zant	4:03

2008 Deluxe Edition bonus CD
No.	Title	Writer(s)	Length
1.	"What's Your Name" (original)	Rossington, Van Zant	3:33
2.	"That Smell" (original)	Collins, Van Zant	5:29
3.	"You Got That Right" (original)	Gaines, Van Zant	3:19
4.	"I Never Dreamed" (original)	Gaines, Van Zant	5:22
5.	"Georgia Peaches" (from Legend)	Gaines, Van Zant	3:14
6.	"Sweet Little Missy" (original)	Rossington, Van Zant	5:16
7.	"Sweet Little Missy" (from Legend)	Rossington, Van Zant	5:11
8.	"Ain't No Good Life" (original)	Gaines	5:02
9.	"That Smell" (complete original)	Collins, Van Zant	7:30
10.	"Jacksonville Kid" (from Collectybles)	Haggard, Van Zant	4:09
11.	"You Got That Right" (live)	Gaines, Van Zant	4:41
12.	"That Smell" (live)	Collins, Van Zant	6:05
13.	"Ain't No Good Life" (live)	Gaines	5:01
14.	"What's Your Name" (live)	Rossington, Van Zant	3:28
15.	"Gimme Three Steps" (live)	Collins, Van Zant	5:09

All tracks were previously unreleased except where noted.

Live tracks recorded at the Selland Arena in Fresno, California on August 24, 1977.

== Personnel ==
Lynyrd Skynyrd

- Ronnie Van Zant – lead vocals
- Steve Gaines – guitar, backing vocals, lead vocals on "Ain't No Good Life", co-lead vocals on "You Got That Right"
- Allen Collins – guitar
- Gary Rossington – guitar
- Leon Wilkeson – bass, backing vocals
- Artimus Pyle – drums
- Billy Powell – keyboards
- Ed King – guitar on "One More Time"
- Greg T. Walker – bass on "One More Time"
- Rickey Medlocke – drums and backing vocals on "One More Time"

Additional personnel

- The Honkettes (JoJo Billingsley, Cassie Gaines, Leslie Hawkins) – backing vocals on "That Smell" and "One More Time"
- Tim Smith – backing vocals on "One More Time"
- Barry Lee Harwood – dobro on "Honky Tonk Night Time Man"

== Charts ==
Chart (1977–78)	Peak position
Australian Albums (Kent Music Report)	68
Canada Top Albums/CDs (RPM)	3
New Zealand Albums (RMNZ)	38
UK Albums (Official Charts)	13
US Billboard 200	5

== Certifications ==
Region	Certification	Certified units/sales
Canada (Music Canada)	Gold	50,000^{^}
United States (RIAA)	2× Platinum	2,000,000^{^}
^{^} Shipments figures based on certification alone.
