= Nuthin' Fancy =

Studio album by Lynyrd Skynyrd
- Released: March 24, 1975
- Recorded: January 1975 (except for track 1, August 1974)
- Studios: WEBB IV Studios, Atlanta (except for track 1, Studio One, Doraville, Georgia)
- Genres: Southern rock, blues rock, boogie rock, hard rock
- Length: 37:34
- Label: MCA
- Producer: Al Kooper

Lynyrd Skynyrd chronology
Second Helping (1974)	Nuthin' Fancy (1975)	Gimme Back My Bullets (1976)

Singles from Nuthin' Fancy
- 1. "Saturday Night Special" / "Made in the Shade" Released: May 19, 1975

Professional ratings
Review scores
Source	Rating
AllMusic	3/5 stars
Christgau's Record Guide	A−
Rolling Stone	(mixed) link
The Daily Vault	B+

Nuthin' Fancy is the third studio album by Southern rock band Lynyrd Skynyrd, released in March 1975. It was the band's first to reach the top 10, peaking at number 9 on the U.S. album chart. It was certified gold on June 27, 1975 and platinum on July 21, 1987, by the RIAA. This was the band's first record with new drummer Artimus Pyle. In late May 1975, guitarist Ed King left the band in the middle of their "Torture Tour." The album is best known for its only single, "Saturday Night Special," which peaked at #27 on the U.S. Billboard chart.

== Critical reception ==
Robert Christgau gave the album a positive review, stating: "On the one hand, two or three cuts here sound like heavy-metal-under-funk—check out 'Saturday Night Special,' a real killer. But on the other, Ronnie Van Zant has never deployed his limited, husky baritone with such subtlety. Where Gregg Allman (to choose a purely random example) is always straight, shuttling his voice between languor and high emotion, Van Zant feints and dodges, sly one moment and sleepy the next, turning boastful or indignant or admonitory with the barest shifts in timbre. I mean, dumb he ain't."

== Track listing ==
All lyrics are written by Ronnie Van Zant.

Side one
No.	Title	Writer(s)	Length
1.	"Saturday Night Special"	Ed King; Van Zant	5:08
2.	"Cheatin' Woman"	Al Kooper; Gary Rossington; Van Zant	4:38
3.	"Railroad Song"	King; Van Zant	4:14
4.	"I'm a Country Boy"	Allen Collins; Van Zant	4:24

Side two
No.	Title	Writer(s)	Length
1.	"On the Hunt"	Collins; Van Zant	5:25
2.	"Am I Losin'"	Rossington; Van Zant	4:32
3.	"Made in the Shade"	Van Zant	4:40
4.	"Whiskey Rock-a-Roller"	King; Billy Powell; Van Zant	4:15

- Sides one and two were combined as tracks 1–8 on CD reissues.

1999 CD reissue bonus tracks
No.	Title	Writer(s)	Length
9.	"Railroad Song" (Live at the Winterland in San Francisco, CA, April 27, 1975)	King; Van Zant	5:27
10.	"On the Hunt" (Live at the Winterland in San Francisco, CA, April 27, 1975)	Collins; Van Zant	6:10

- Tracks 9 and 10 are previously unreleased

== Personnel ==
Personnel taken from Nuthin' Fancy liner notes.

Lynyrd Skynyrd

- Ronnie Van Zant – lead vocals
- Ed King – guitars, Moog bass on "Made in the Shade"
- Allen Collins – guitars
- Gary Rossington – guitars (all except "Railroad Song")
- Leon Wilkeson – bass guitar, backing vocals on "Saturday Night Special", "Railroad Song", and "I'm a Country Boy"
- Billy Powell – keyboards
- Artimus Pyle – drums, percussion

Additional personnel

- Al Kooper – Moog synthesizers on "Saturday Night Special", organ on "Cheatin' Woman" and "Railroad Song", backing vocals on "Railroad Song", "Am I Losin'" and "Whiskey Rock-a-Roller", percussion on "I'm a Country Boy", piano on "Made in the Shade"
- Jimmy Hall – harmonica on "Railroad Song" and "Made in the Shade"
- Bobbye Hall – percussion on "Railroad Song" and "On the Hunt"
- Barry Lee Harwood – mandolin and Dobro on "Made in the Shade"
- David Foster – piano on "Whiskey Rock-a-Roller"

Production

- Al Kooper – production, engineering

== Charts ==
Chart (1975)	Peak position
Australian Albums (Kent Music Report)	91
Canada Top Albums/CDs (RPM)	17
UK Albums (Official Charts)	43
US Billboard 200	9

== Certifications ==
Region	Certification	Certified units/sales
United States (RIAA)	Platinum	1,000,000^{^}
^{^} Shipments figures based on certification alone.
