= Call Me the Breeze =

1972 song by J. J. Cale

Song by J. J. Cale

from the album Naturally
- Released: 1971
- Recorded: 1970
- Genre: Blues rock, rock and roll, roots rock, country rock
- Length: 2:37
- Label: Mercury
- Songwriter: J. J. Cale
- Producer: Audie Ashworth

Official audio
- "Call Me the Breeze" on YouTube

"Call Me the Breeze" is a rock song by J. J. Cale. It first appeared on his 1971 debut album, Naturally, as the opening track. The song consists of a 12-bar blues guitar shuffle and features the early use of a drum machine.

== Certifications ==
Certifications for Call Me the Breeze
Region	Certification	Certified units/sales
New Zealand (RMNZ)	Gold	15,000^{‡}
^{‡} Sales+streaming figures based on certification alone.

== Lynyrd Skynyrd version ==
"Call Me the Breeze"

Song by Lynyrd Skynyrd

from the album Second Helping
- Released: 1974
- Recorded: January 1974
- Genre: Blues rock; hard rock; Southern rock; country rock; boogie rock; rock and roll
- Length: 5:09
- Label: Sounds of the South; MCA
- Songwriter: JJ Cale
- Producer: Al Kooper

Like many Cale songs, "Call Me the Breeze" has been covered numerous times by an assortment of musicians, most notably Lynyrd Skynyrd on their albums Second Helping (1974) and the live disc One More from the Road (1976), Mason Proffit on their 1972 album Rockfish Crossing, Bobby Bare on his album Bobby Bare: The Country Store Collection (1988), Johnny Cash on his album Water from the Wells of Home (1988) with his son John Carter Cash, John Mayer on his 2013 album Paradise Valley, former Guns N' Roses guitarist and songwriter Izzy Stradlin' in 2016, and UK singer Alan Price on his 1977 album Two of a Kind with Rob Hoeke. Many of the cover versions available have been performed as tributes to Lynyrd Skynyrd. For example, Les Claypool covers it on his album Under the Influence: A Jam Band Tribute to Lynyrd Skynyrd.

In 1992 the song was reworked by Spiritualized on their album Lazer Guided Melodies. Entitled "Run", it retained Cale's lyrics but featured completely new music by Jason Pierce.

== Eric Clapton's adaptation ==
"They Call Me the Breeze"

Single by Eric Clapton

from the album The Breeze: An Appreciation of JJ Cale
- Released: June 30, 2014
- Genre: Rock · pop rock
- Length: 2:53
- Label: Surfdog · Polydor
- Songwriter: JJ Cale
- Producer: Clapton · Simon Climie

Eric Clapton singles chronology
"All of Me" (2013)	"They Call Me the Breeze" (2014)	"Don't Wait" (2014)

Music video
- "Eric Clapton & Friends - Call Me The Breeze (Official Lyric Video)" on YouTube

=== Performance and release ===
J. J. Cale performed the song along with Clapton, his longtime friend, at Clapton's 2004 Crossroads Guitar Festival. The version, featuring an extended guitar solo by Clapton, is included on the official DVD released in late 2004. Later, when Clapton got the news that Cale had died, he performed various tunes composed by Cale for his 2013 Baloise Session concert, dedicating his performance to Cale. For his 2014 tribute-album to Cale, titled The Breeze: An Appreciation of JJ Cale, Clapton covered the song with the original drum machine sound at the beginning, saying it's not possible to really cover Cale's work: "You can hear the drum machine and J. J. rambling at the beginning there". His take on the song was released under the title "They Call Me the Breeze" as a promotional single on June 30, 2014 for Surfdog and Polydor Records, accessible via digital music download.

=== Music video ===
On June 6, 2014, Clapton's management published the official video on his YouTube channel before the album's release. Twenty days later the official music video was released, directed by Joseph Toman. It features original photographic and videographic material of both Cale, and Clapton with Cale. The video opens with Clapton, hitchhiking with his guitar case in a rural location, holding a sign for Escondido, mimicking the cover art of the duo's album, The Road to Escondido. He is picked up by a car. The car footage is interspersed with Clapton who is seen singing and playing the song on a guitar given to him by Cale in 2006. While driving around, Clapton chats to the driver, portrayed by English actor and director Dexter Fletcher, about Cale, explaining that he wants to visit Escondido because an "old mate used to live there". Clapton pays tribute to Cale saying "he was a fantastic guy and a great musician ... he was my hero." The video ends with a shot of Clapton congratulating Cale after their performance at the 2004 Crossroads Guitar Festival.

=== Weekly charts ===
Chart (2014)	Peak position
Belgium (Ultratip Bubbling Under Flanders)	52
Belgium (Ultratip Bubbling Under Wallonia)	16
