= Leon Wilkeson =

American bass guitarist (1952–2001)

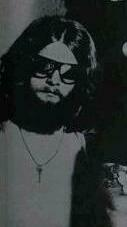
- Wilkeson in 1977

Background information
- Born: Leon Russell Wilkeson; April 2, 1952; Newport, Rhode Island, U.S.
- Died: July 27, 2001 (aged 49) Ponte Vedra Beach, Florida, U.S.
- Genre: Southern rock
- Occupation: Bassist
- Years active: 1966–2001
- Formerly of: Vision, Lynyrd Skynyrd

Leon Russell Wilkeson (April 2, 1952 – July 27, 2001) was an American musician. He was the bassist of the southern rock band Lynyrd Skynyrd from 1972 until his death in 2001.

== Early life ==
Born on April 2, 1952, in Newport, Rhode Island, but raised in Jacksonville, Florida, Wilkeson became a major Beatles fan just as he was becoming a teenager and began learning to play bass guitar in order to emulate his favorite Beatle, Paul McCartney. Wilkeson dropped out of his school band in order to focus on learning the bass at the age of 14 and shortly afterward was approached by a fellow student who told him that her brother was searching for a bassist for his band. Her brother turned out to be Ronnie Van Zant, and soon after, Wilkeson signed on with Van Zant's group, the Collegiates. However, due to plummeting school grades, Wilkeson had to drop out of the group. Soon Wilkeson found himself in another local group, the King James Version. He began to study the "lead bass style" of bassists such as Cream's Jack Bruce, Led Zeppelin's John Paul Jones, Jefferson Airplane's Jack Casady, The Grateful Dead's Phil Lesh and the Allman Brothers' Berry Oakley. By 1972, Wilkeson was becoming one of Jacksonville's top bassists. When Lynyrd Skynyrd's bassist Greg T. Walker left the band, Wilkeson was brought in as his replacement. For a short time, Wilkeson worked at a dairy plant, Farm Best Dairy in Jacksonville, during which on an interview he laughed that he "got paid every two weeks and got all the ice cream he could eat".

== Lynyrd Skynyrd ==
Lynyrd Skynyrd signed with Al Kooper's production company, Sounds of the South, a joint venture with MCA Records, in 1973. Wilkeson returned to Jacksonville and his regular job stocking ice cream at Farmbest Dairy Products. Former Strawberry Alarm Clock lead guitarist Ed King replaced Wilkeson during the recording of Skynyrd's debut album, Pronounced Leh-Nerd Skin-Nerd, but just as sessions wrapped up, King and vocalist Ronnie Van Zant both agreed that King wasn't suited to be a bassist. Van Zant subsequently visited Wilkeson and convinced him to rejoin the band, and King moved to co-lead guitar.

With its outlaw image, tough Southern rock, and solid touring, Skynyrd quickly became one of the top bands of the 1970s, scoring such hit albums as 1974's Second Helping, 1975's Nuthin' Fancy, 1976's Gimme Back My Bullets and One More from the Road, plus 1977's Street Survivors and such hit singles as "Free Bird" and "Sweet Home Alabama." It was also during this time that Wilkeson picked up the gimmick of wearing colorful hats onstage, garnering the nickname "Mad Hatter."

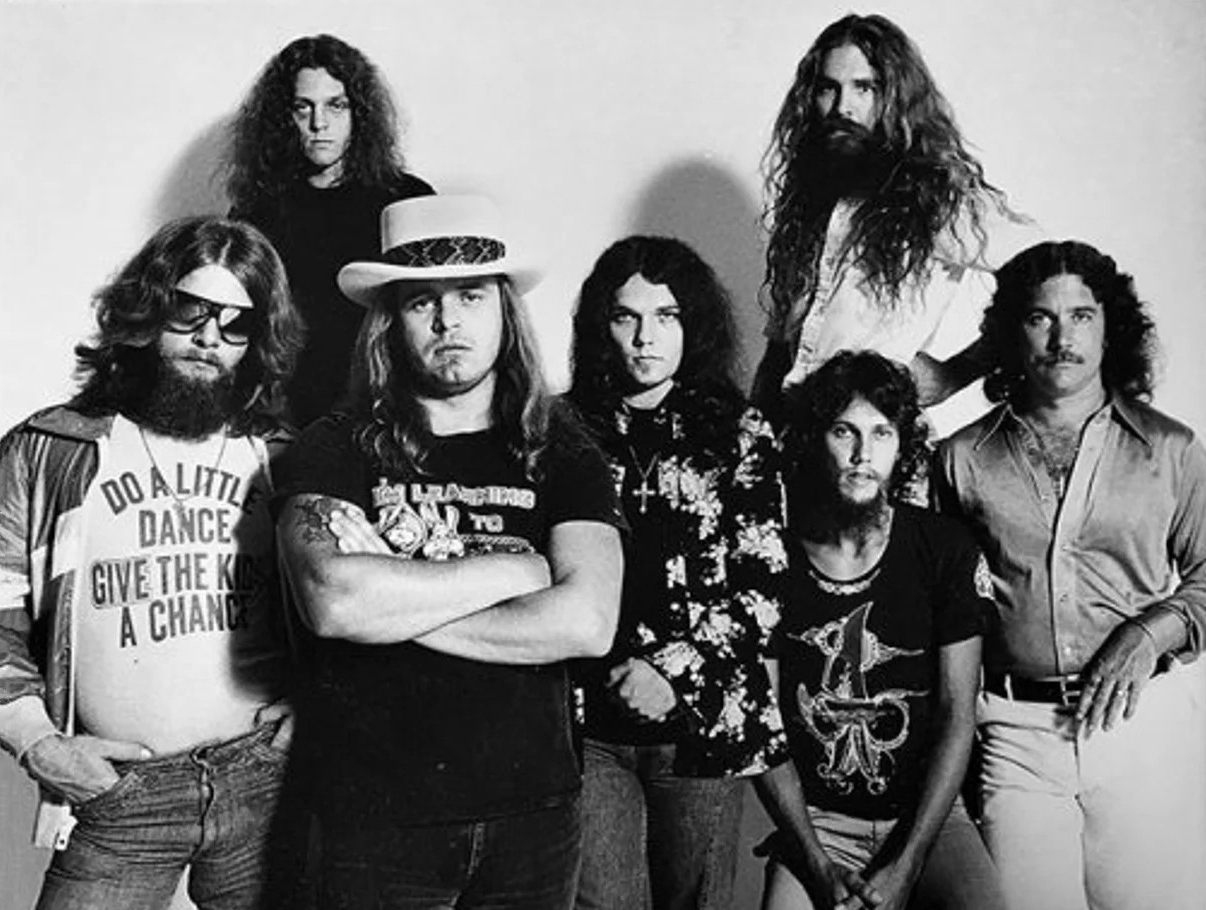
Lynyrd Skynyrd in 1977 (from left to right): Leon Wilkeson, Allen Collins, Ronnie Van Zant, Gary Rossington, Steve Gaines, Artimus Pyle and Billy Powell

Wilkeson acquired a "Fenderbird" bass from John Entwistle. The Fenderbird bass mated a custom made Gibson Thunderbird body to a Fender Precision Bass neck. Wilkeson can be seen playing this bass in a 1975 Lynyrd Skynyrd performance on the British TV series The Old Grey Whistle Test.

== 1977 plane crash ==
The band and its entourage went down in a plane crash on October 20, 1977 following their final concert in Greenville, South Carolina, outside of Gillsburg, Mississippi, which left members Ronnie Van Zant, Steve Gaines and Cassie Gaines dead and the rest suffering severe lacerations, broken bones and various internal injuries. Wilkeson was seated next to Steve Gaines, and both were thrown face first into a bulkhead at high speed while still strapped in their airline seats. Wilkeson awoke to find Gaines dead from a broken neck and himself severely injured. At the hospital, he was found to have suffered a closed double fracture of his left leg, a severe double compound fracture of his left arm, 6 broken ribs (one of which was an internal compound fracture that punctured and deflated his left lung), upper/lower jaw/nose/facial bones extensively smashed and 15 teeth knocked out. The injury to his left arm was most concerning, as the dirty water of the swamp had already extensively contaminated his open wounds, and the additional surgery he would need to rebuild his face and arm with steel plates would raise his risk of infection even further. His hands had survived intact, but his fretting arm suffered such extensive nerve damage that its amputation was seriously considered. Subsequently, he was left with a greatly reduced range of motion, which forced him to hold his bass close to his body and at a distinctive near-vertical orientation. Wilkeson returned to playing music professionally three years later, but never recovered his original dexterity on the instrument.

== Post-plane crash ==
After the crash, Wilkeson and the other survivors mostly stayed out of the spotlight for the remainder of the 1970s, as they attempted to put their lives back together. Wilkeson managed to record bass parts for the 1979 album Contraband by Jacksonville band "Alias". The 1980s appeared to bring great promise for most of the surviving band members, as a new group, the Rossington-Collins Band, formed, consisting of Wilkeson, guitarists Gary Rossington and Allen Collins, and keyboardist Billy Powell.

== After Lynyrd Skynyrd ==
The Rossington-Collins Band got off to a good start, as their 1980 debut, '"Anytime, Anyplace, Anywhere," became a modest hit. But shortly after the release of their second album, 1982's This Is the Way, the band split up. Wilkeson opted to remain with Collins in a new venture, The Allen Collins Band, issuing one album in 1983, Here, There and Back. After the Allen Collins Band fizzled, little was heard from Wilkeson during the mid-1980s, except for a short-lived membership with Rocco Marshall's Christian-rock band Vision, which also included Billy Powell. But in 1987, Wilkeson and Powell signed on with a reunited version of Skynyrd, with Ronnie Van Zant's youngest brother, Johnny, performing lead vocals. The group embarked on a successful, sold-out tour. The new Skynyrd continued to tour and release albums on a regular basis.

== Death ==
Wilkeson died in his sleep on July 27, 2001, at age 49 at the Sawgrass Marriott Resort & Beach Club in Ponte Vedra Beach, Florida. He was pronounced dead by St Johns County Fire Rescue Paramedic, Charlie Galambos. Galambos reports that leaving the scene moments after pronouncing Wilkeson dead, news had already leaked to the media, as he listened to the report on local FM radio. Wilkeson was in town to address charges of driving under the influence, for which he had been cited earlier that year. A medical examiner reported that Wilkeson was suffering from chronic liver and lung disease and died of natural causes. Wilkeson's death put the group in a difficult position since an agreement with Ronnie Van Zant's widow, Judy Jenness, mandated that at least three of Skynyrd's longtime members would have to appear in order for the band to use the name Lynyrd Skynyrd. Jenness waived this proviso, and the group continued with replacement bassist Ean Evans.

Lynyrd Skynyrd dedicated the song "Mad Hatter" from their 2003 album Vicious Cycle to Wilkeson's memory.
