= Lynyrd Skynyrd plane crash =

1977 aviation accident in Mississippi, USA

Convair CV-240 N55VM crash
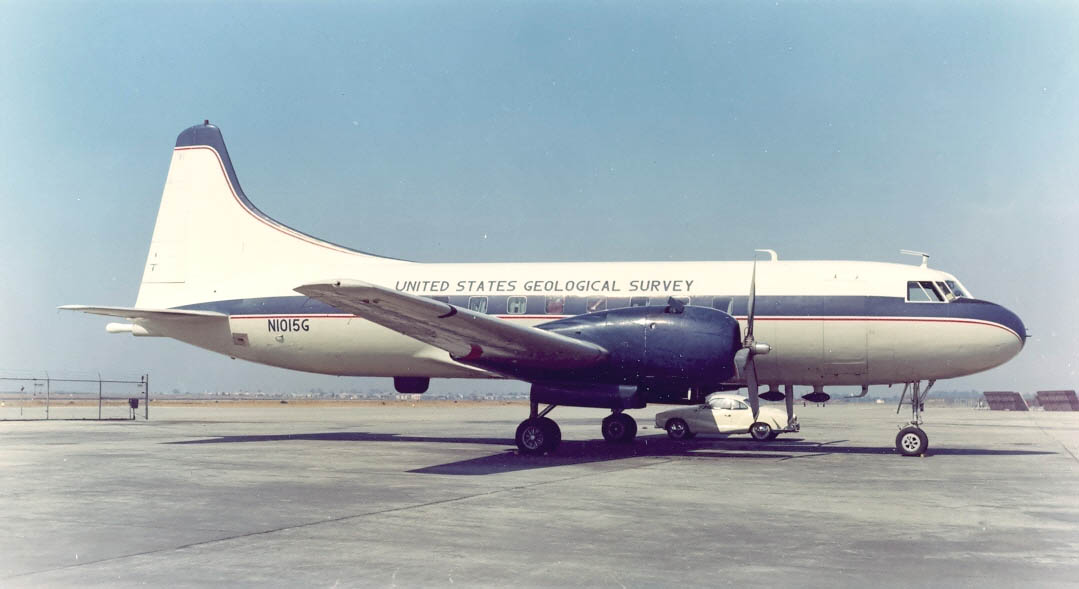
- A Convair CV-240 similar to the accident aircraft

Accident
- Date: October 20, 1977; 18:52 (CST)
- Summary: Fuel exhaustion
- Site: Heavily wooded swamp, Amite County, Mississippi, United States, five miles (8 km) northeast of Gillsburg; 31°04′19″N 90°35′57″W

Aircraft
- Aircraft type: Convair CV-240
- Operator: L & J Company of Addison, Texas
- Call sign: 5 VICTOR MIKE
- Registration: N55VM
- Flight origin: Greenville Downtown Airport, Greenville, South Carolina
- Destination: Baton Rouge Metropolitan Airport, Baton Rouge, Louisiana
- Occupants: 26
- Passengers: 24
- Crew: 2
- Fatalities: 6
- Injuries: 20
- Survivors: 20

The flight departed Greenville, South Carolina for Baton Rouge, Louisiana, ultimately crashing near Gillsburg, Mississippi

On October 20, 1977, a Convair CV-240 passenger aircraft ran out of fuel and crashed in a wooded area near Gillsburg, Mississippi, United States. Chartered by the rock band Lynyrd Skynyrd from L & J Company of Addison, Texas, it was flying from Greenville, South Carolina, to Baton Rouge, Louisiana, crashing near its destination.

Lead vocalist and founding member Ronnie Van Zant, guitarist and vocalist Steve Gaines, backing vocalist Cassie Gaines (Steve's older sister), assistant road manager Dean Kilpatrick, Captain Walter McCreary, and First Officer William John Gray all died as a result of the crash, while twenty others survived. The tragedy abruptly halted Lynyrd Skynyrd's career until Van Zant's brother Johnny reformed the band ten years later.

== Accident ==
On October 19, 1977, two days after releasing their album Street Survivors, Lynyrd Skynyrd performed at the Greenville Memorial Auditorium in Greenville, South Carolina. The following day they boarded a Convair CV-240 airplane to take them to Baton Rouge, Louisiana, where they were to perform at Louisiana State University. The plane ran out of fuel near the end of the flight.

Upon realizing that the plane had insufficient fuel, the pilots attempted to navigate to McComb Airport, about 10 miles (16 km) northeast of the eventual crash site in Amite County, Mississippi, but soon realized that the plane would not make it. As a last resort, they attempted an emergency landing in an open field about 300 yd (270 m) from where the plane eventually went down. Despite their efforts, at approximately 6:52 pm the plane skimmed about 100 yd (90 m) along the top of the tree line before smashing into a large tree and splitting into pieces near Gillsburg, Mississippi.

Early in the flight, witnesses recall that lead vocalist Ronnie Van Zant was lying on the floor with a pillow, having been up most of the previous night and being in need of sleep. Several other passengers passed the time by playing cards. At some point the passengers became aware that something was wrong, and drummer Artimus Pyle recalled entering the flight deck and being told by the terrified captain, Walter McCreary, to go back and strap himself in. With the gravity of the situation clear, the passengers sat in silence, some praying. Guitarist Gary Rossington recalled hearing what sounded like hundreds of baseball bats hitting the plane's fuselage as it began striking trees. The sound got louder and louder until Rossington was knocked unconscious; he awoke some time later on the ground with the plane's door on top of him.

Keyboard player Billy Powell's nose was nearly torn off in the crash as he suffered severe facial lacerations and deep lacerations to his right leg. Decades later, he gave an account of the flight's final moments on a VH1 Behind the Music special, stating that Van Zant, who was not wearing a seat belt, was thrown violently from his seat and died immediately when his head hit a tree as the plane broke apart. Some elements of Powell's version of the events, however, have been disputed by both drummer Pyle and Van Zant's widow Judy Van Zant Jenness, who posted the autopsy reports on the band's web site in early 1998, while confirming other aspects of Powell's account. Pyle suffered broken ribs but, with two other crash survivors, managed to leave the crash site and reach a local farm. The farmer mistook them for escaped convicts and fired a shot in the air, warning them to get off his property. Pyle was finally able to convince him that they had been involved in a plane crash and needed help.

Van Zant, guitarist/vocalist Steve Gaines, backing vocalist Cassie Gaines (Steve's sister), assistant road manager Dean Kilpatrick, Captain McCreary and First Officer William John Gray all died in the crash. Most of the survivors had been seated toward the back of the plane. The survivors, all of whom were seriously injured, were transported to different hospitals for treatment and were not immediately aware of the fatalities. Rossington, for instance, was not informed until days later by his mother in the hospital that Van Zant had been killed.

Cassie Gaines had been so fearful of flying in the Convair that she had preferred to travel in the band's cramped equipment truck instead, but Van Zant convinced her to board the plane on October 20. Another member of the band's trio of back-up singers (collectively known as the "Honkettes"), JoJo Billingsley, was not on the plane as she was under a doctor's care in Senatobia, Mississippi, dealing with health problems brought about by substance abuse. Billingsley planned on re-joining the tour in Little Rock, Arkansas, on October 23. She reported dreaming of the plane crash and begging guitarist and founding member Allen Collins by telephone not to continue using the Convair. The band's ex-guitarist, Ed King, said later that he "always knew it wasn't gonna end well" for the band due to their penchant for drinking and brawling, but he could never have envisioned it ending the way it did, and recalls being overcome with sadness upon learning of the crash.

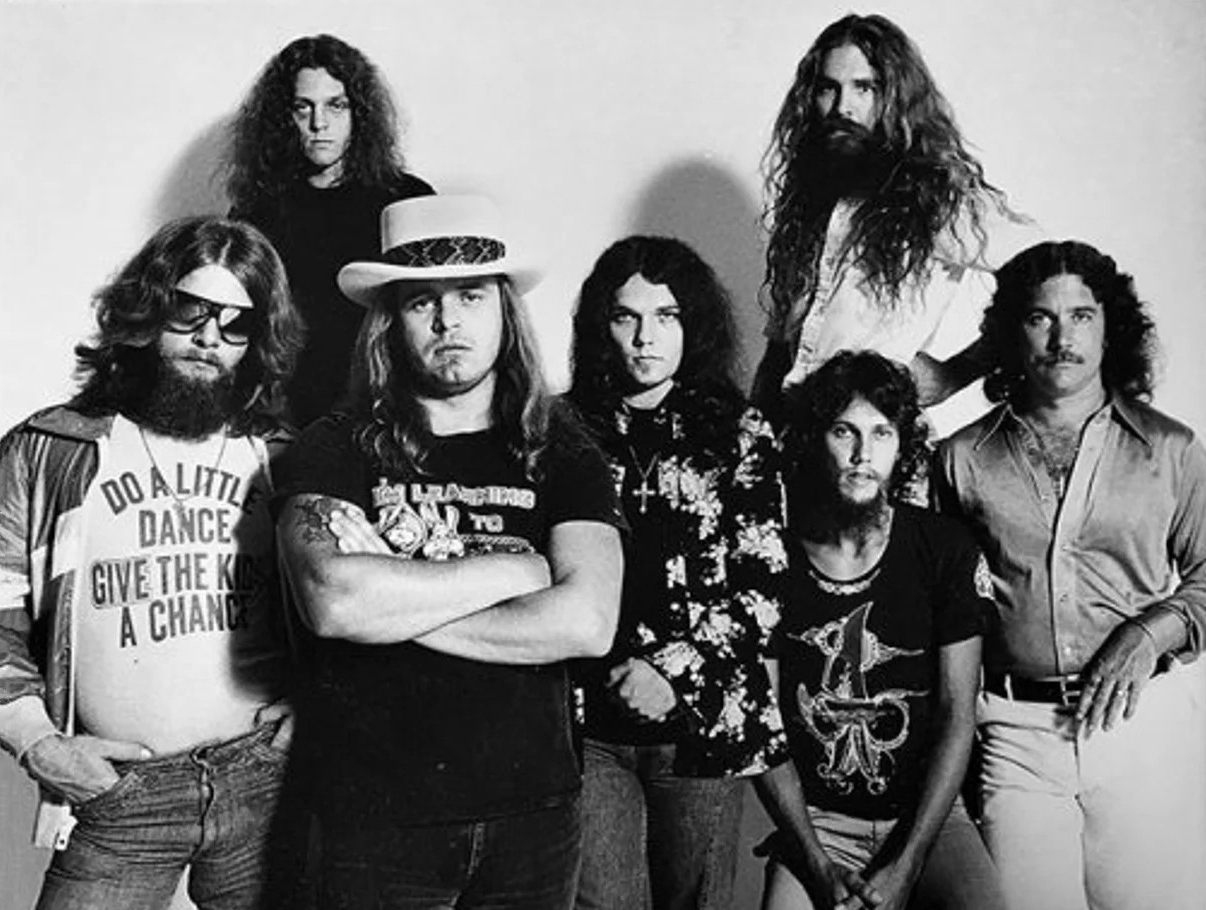
Lynyrd Skynyrd in 1977

It was later discovered that the very same aircraft had earlier been inspected by members of Aerosmith's flight crew for possible use in their Draw the Line tour, but it was rejected because it was felt that neither the plane nor the crew were up to standard. Aerosmith's assistant chief of flight operations, Zunk Buker, told of observing pilots McCreary and Gray sharing a bottle of Jack Daniel's while he and his father inspected the plane. Aerosmith's touring family were quite shaken after receiving word of the crash, as Steven Tyler and Joe Perry had pressured their management into renting that specific plane for use on their tour.

Scottish rock band Nazareth were touring with Lynyrd Skynyrd at the time of the crash, and narrowly avoided boarding the flight themselves. Bassist Pete Agnew explained: "Artimus Pyle had lived in Greenville, where the plane took off from, and was having a barbecue. They'd invited us along and then on to the next gig with them. But we'd seen their plane – which looked like Gaffa Tape Airlines..." The fabricated excuse of "doing some promo" was ultimately used to get out of attending but Lynyrd Skynyrd's road crew, under the mistaken impression Nazareth had gone to the barbecue, announced that Nazareth too were among the fatalities. Vocalist Dan McCafferty recalled: "At the next gig, when I phoned the wife, she burst into tears with relief."

The doomed flight of October 20, 1977, was intended to be the last Lynyrd Skynyrd would make on the Convair. "We were flying in a plane that looked like it belonged to the Clampett family," said Pyle, and the band had decided that their status as one of the world's top rock acts warranted an upgrade. The band had planned on acquiring a Learjet after arriving in Baton Rouge, to replace the 30-year-old plane, which all in the band's circle agreed was well past its prime.

=== Rescue ===
Rescuers had to cross a 20-foot-wide (6 m), waist-deep creek and dig through an overgrown forest, while digging out rescue vehicles that got stuck in the mud. Locals worked with rescue officials and drove victims to the hospital in the back of pick-up trucks. One local resident recalled, "I found someone on the ground alive. When I walked to the other side of the plane, I tripped on another person." Another resident commended the actions of all those who helped, and highlighted that, "Some of them were out on that highway directing traffic. Some of them went home and got tractors. My wife was home on a CB radio. I'm relaying messages on CB to her, ten miles away."

== Cause ==
After the accident, the National Transportation Safety Board (NTSB) removed, inspected, and tested the right engine's ignition magneto and found it to be operating normally, concluding, "No mechanical or electrical discrepancies were found during the examination of the right magneto." The inspection also determined that, "All of the fuel cross-feed and fuel dump valves were in the closed position."

Billy Powell, among others, spoke of seeing flames shooting out of the plane's right engine during a flight just days before the crash. The subsequent report by the NTSB listed "an engine malfunction of undetermined nature" in that same engine as a contributing factor in the crash. Pyle told Howard Stern years later in an interview that the fuel gauge in the older-model plane was known to malfunction and the pilots had neglected to check the tanks manually before taking off. Toxicology reports from both pilots' autopsies found no traces of alcohol or other drugs. "Crew inattention to fuel supply" was ultimately determined to be responsible for the crash.

The National Transportation Safety Board determined that the probable cause of this accident was fuel exhaustion and total loss of power from both engines due to crew inattention to fuel supply. Contributing to the fuel exhaustion were inadequate flight planning and an engine malfunction of undetermined nature in the right engine that resulted in "torching" and higher-than-normal fuel consumption.

— NTSB Accident Report

The accident report records that the aircraft was both owned and operated by L & J Company, but the lease to Lynyrd Skynyrd's production company specified that Lynyrd Skynyrd was the operator and therefore was responsible for regulatory compliance (including managing the flight crew). The flight crew were employed by a third party, and the lease period was three weeks. The report records the Federal Aviation Administration (FAA) as taking legal action against L & J Company in relation to the operator responsibility, and the analysis section concludes by asking, "How does the system in such a case protect a lessee who is uninformed either by design, by inadvertence, or by his own carelessness?"

== Legacy ==
The crash took place three days following the release of the band's fifth studio album Street Survivors. The album cover showed the band surrounded by flames. Following the plane crash, MCA replaced the image with a new cover, showing the band against a simple black background, which was on the back of the original sleeve. The site of the crash has become a memorial for fans, rescuers and survivors, with an oak tree that has been carved with Lynyrd Skynyrd iconography, while the site was also the location of a fortieth anniversary memorial by survivors and rescuers.

In 2017, surviving members of the band and family of those who died in the crash filed a lawsuit to block production and distribution of a film entitled Street Survivors: The True Story of the Lynyrd Skynyrd Plane Crash. The dispute stemmed from a "blood oath" by survivors, reportedly taken after the crash, never to use the name Lynyrd Skynyrd again in an effort to capitalize on the tragedy that had befallen them. The film premiered at the Hollywood Reel Independent Film Festival on February 18, 2020.

== See also ==
- List of music group fatalities from aviation accidents
