= Steve Gaines =

American guitarist (1949–1977)

Background information
- Also known as: Okie: Crawdaddy
- Born: Steven Earl Gaines; September 14, 1949; Miami, Oklahoma, U.S.
- Died: October 20, 1977 (aged 28) Gillsburg, Mississippi, U.S.
- Genres: Blues, Southern rock
- Occupation: Guitarist
- Years active: 1964–1977
- Formerly of: Lynyrd Skynyrd

Steven Earl Gaines (September 14, 1949 – October 20, 1977) was an American musician. He is best known as a guitarist and backing vocalist with rock band Lynyrd Skynyrd from 1976 until his death in the October 1977 airplane crash that claimed other band members and crew. His older sister Cassie Gaines, a backup vocalist with the band, also died in the crash.

== Life and career ==
Gaines was born and raised in Miami, Oklahoma. When he was 15 years old, he saw the Beatles performing live in Kansas City. After being driven home from the concert, he pestered his father to buy him his first guitar. His band, Manalive, recorded at the Sun Records Studio in Memphis, Tennessee. In the 1970s, Steve played with bands ILMO Smokehouse from Quincy, Illinois, Detroit with Rusty Day (an offshoot of The Detroit Wheels) and Crawdad (a band that Steve had started around 1974). In 1975, he recorded several songs with Crawdad at Capricorn studios in Macon, Georgia which were released by MCA in 1988 as One in the Sun (when Lynyrd Skynyrd band began touring). This album is listed as his only official solo album. Steve has two other albums, which are rare CDs from Steve's widow Teresa: I Know a Little (a collection of live recordings with Crawdad as well as Manalive) and Okie Special (a collection of live recordings with Crawdad as well as Detroit). Only 100 copies of each of the two CDs have been made.

In December 1975, Steve's older sister, Cassie, became a member of Southern rock band Lynyrd Skynyrd's female backup singers, The Honkettes. The band had been seeking a replacement for Ed King, one of three lead guitarists in its lineup, since his departure in mid-1975. Cassie recommended Steve, and after initial reluctance the band allowed him to join them onstage for a song during a show at Municipal Auditorium in Kansas City, Missouri on May 11, 1976, Jimmie Rodgers' "T-For Texas, (Blue Yodel #1)". Although the band couldn't hear Steve's playing onstage, soundman Kevin Elson was listening through headphones and told them that Steve was outstanding. They jammed with him informally a couple of times more, then invited him into the band just in time for the recording of Skynyrd's live album One More from the Road. The first of three shows recorded for the album was Gaines' third gig with the band.

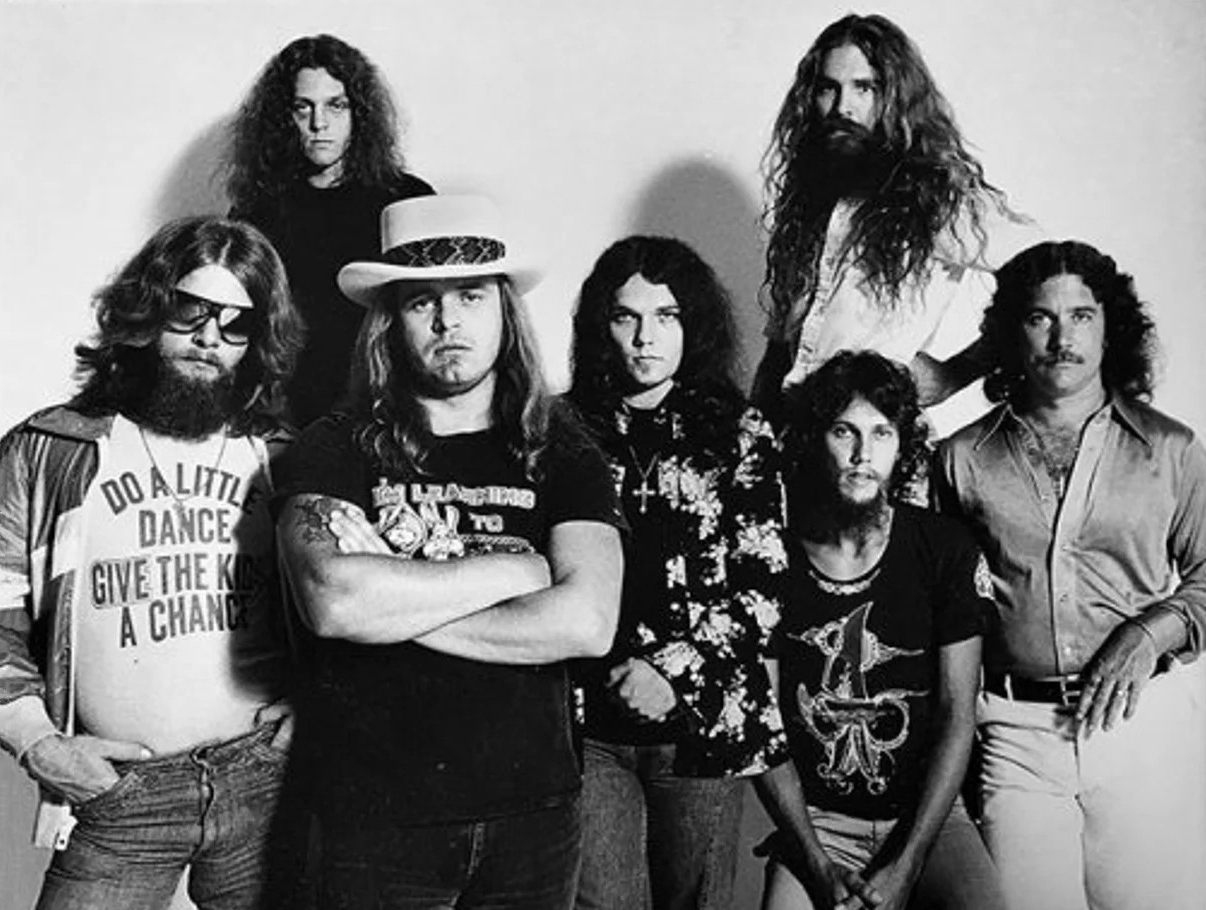
Steve Gaines with Lynyrd Skynyrd in 1977 (from left to right): Leon Wilkeson, Allen Collins, Ronnie Van Zant, Gary Rossington, Steve Gaines, Artimus Pyle and Billy Powell.

== Plane crash, death and legacy ==
On October 20, 1977, three days after Street Survivors was released (and five dates into the band's most successful ticket sales tour yet), a plane carrying both musicians and crew between shows from Greenville, South Carolina to Baton Rouge, Louisiana, crashed outside of Gillsburg, Mississippi. The plane landed in a swampy area and crashed into trees, killing Gaines, lead singer Ronnie Van Zant, Cassie Gaines, assistant road manager Dean Kilpatrick, pilot Walter McCreary, and co-pilot William Gray.

Gaines was cremated and his ashes were buried in Orange Park, Florida in 1977, but were relocated to an undisclosed location after vandals broke into his and Van Zant's tombs on June 29, 2000. Their mausoleums remain as memorials for fans to visit. 10 years later, the new location of their interment was accidentally revealed by a Craigslist ad. A family selling two plots they decided not to retain, ran a Craigslist ad and stated the plots were in the Jacksonville Memory Gardens Cemetery in Orange Park, Florida, adjacent to Ronnie Van Zant's tomb.

== Discography ==
Lynyrd Skynyrd

- One More from the Road (1976)
- Street Survivors (1977)

Solo

- One in the Sun (1988)
