= Gold & Platinum =

Greatest hits album by Lynyrd Skynyrd
- Released: December 1979
- Recorded: 1972–1977
- Genre: Southern rock, boogie rock
- Length: 84:09
- Label: MCA

Lynyrd Skynyrd chronology
Skynyrd's First and... Last (1978)	Gold & Platinum (1979)	Best of the Rest (1982)

Alternate cover

Professional ratings
Review scores
Source	Rating
Allmusic	5/5 stars
Christgau's Record Guide	A
Record Mirror	4/5 stars

Gold & Platinum is a 2-disc best of/hits compilation by Lynyrd Skynyrd. It was released in 1979. The compilation spans their peak years from 1972–1977.

The album contains three live tracks from the band's critically acclaimed One More from the Road: "Gimme Three Steps", "I Ain't the One", and "Free Bird".

An Alternate version of the album, with different artwork and the title The Very Best of, substituted the original 1973 studio recording (from (Pronounced 'Lĕh-'nérd 'Skin-'nérd)) of "Free Bird" (timed at 9:08) for the much longer live track (timed at 14:10).

The album was certified Gold on March 25, 1980, Platinum on August 18, 1980, and 3× Platinum on July 21, 1987, by the RIAA.

== Track listing ==
Disc 1
No.	Title	Writer(s)	Source	Length
1.	"Down South Jukin'"	Gary Rossington, Ronnie Van Zant	Skynyrd's First and... Last (1978)	02:12
2.	"Saturday Night Special"	Ed King, Van Zant	Nuthin' Fancy (1975)	05:08
3.	"Gimme Three Steps (Live)" (Not on Alternate)	Allen Collins, Van Zant	One More from the Road (1976), recorded 7/9/1976 at the Fox Theatre in Atlanta, Georgia	05:00
4.	"What's Your Name"	Rossington, Van Zant	Street Survivors	03:31
5.	"You Got That Right"	Steve Gaines, Van Zant	Street Survivors	03:46
6.	"Gimme Back My Bullets"	Rossington, Van Zant	Gimme Back My Bullets (1976)	03:28
7.	"Sweet Home Alabama"	King, Rossington, Van Zant	Second Helping (1974)	04:44
8.	"Free Bird (Live)" (Alternate: Free Bird (9:08))	Collins, Van Zant	One More from the Road (1976), recorded 7/8/1976 at the Fox Theatre in Atlanta, Georgia	14:10
Total length:				41:59

Disc 2
No.	Title	Writer(s)	Source	Length
1.	"That Smell"	Collins, Van Zant	Street Survivors (1977)	05:47
2.	"On the Hunt"	Collins, Van Zant	Nuthin' Fancy (1975)	05:25
3.	"I Ain't the One (Live)" (Not on Alternate)	Rossington, Van Zant	One More from the Road (1976), recorded 7/8/1976 at the Fox Theatre in Atlanta, Georgia	03:17
4.	"Whiskey Rock-a-Roller"	King, Billy Powell, Van Zant	Nuthin' Fancy (1975)	04:23
5.	"Simple Man"	Rossington, Van Zant	(Pronounced 'Lĕh-'nérd 'Skin-'nérd) (1973)	05:57
6.	"I Know a Little"	Gaines	Street Survivors (1977)	03:28
7.	"Tuesday's Gone"	Collins, Van Zant	(Pronounced 'Lĕh-'nérd 'Skin-'nérd) (1973)	07:32
8.	"Comin' Home"	Collins, Van Zant	Skynyrd's First and... Last (1978)	05:30
Total length:				41:19

== Personnel ==
- Ronnie Van Zant - vocals
- Gary Rossington - guitars
- Allen Collins - guitars
- Ed King - guitars, bass (13, 15)
- Steve Gaines - guitars, vocals (4)
- Jimmy Johnson - guitar (1)
- Wayne Perkins - guitar (1)
- Leon Wilkeson - bass, background vocals (2)
- Greg Walker - bass (16)
- Bob Burns - drums
- Artimus Pyle - drums
- Robert Nix - drums (15)
- Rickey Medlocke - drums (16), back-up vocals (16)
- Billy Powell - keyboards, piano (16)
- David Foster - keyboards (12)
- Al Kooper a.k.a. "Roosevelt Gook" - moog synthesizer (2), background vocal (12), organ (13), mellotron (15), back-up harmony (15)
- Ronnie Eades - saxophone (1)
- Leslie Hawkins - back-up vocals
- Cassie Gaines, Jo Billingsley - back-up vocals (1,9)
- Clydie King, Merry Clayton and Friends - background vocals (7)

== Certifications ==
Region	Certification	Certified units/sales
United Kingdom (BPI)	Silver	60,000^{^}
United States (RIAA)	3× Platinum	3,000,000^{^}
^{^} Shipments figures based on certification alone.
