= All Time Greatest Hits (Lynyrd Skynyrd album) =

Greatest hits album by Lynyrd Skynyrd
- Released: March 14, 2000
- Recorded: 1973–1977
- Genre: Southern rock
- Length: 74:56
- Label: MCA
- Producer: Al Kooper, Tom Dowd, Lynyrd Skynyrd, Tim Smith, Jimmy R. Johnson, Ron O'Brien

Lynyrd Skynyrd chronology
Edge of Forever (1999)	All Time Greatest Hits (2000)	Christmas Time Again (2000)

Professional ratings
Review scores
Source	Rating
AllMusic	link
Rolling Stone	link
Starpulse	link

All Time Greatest Hits is a compilation album by American rock band Lynyrd Skynyrd, released in 2000. The album was certified gold on March 24, 2003 and platinum on June 20, 2005 by the RIAA.

== Track listing ==
1. "Sweet Home Alabama" (Ed King, Gary Rossington, Ronnie Van Zant) – 4:45
2. "Gimme Three Steps" (Allen Collins, Van Zant) – 4:31
3. "Simple Man" (Rossington, Van Zant) – 5:58
4. "Saturday Night Special" (King, Van Zant) – 5:11
5. "Swamp Music" (King, Van Zant) – 3:32
6. "The Ballad of Curtis Loew" (Collins, Van Zant) – 4:52
7. "Call Me the Breeze" (J.J. Cale) – 5:09
8. "Comin' Home" (Collins, Van Zant) – 5:32
9. "Gimme Back My Bullets" (Rossington, Van Zant) – 3:30
10. "What's Your Name?" (Rossington, Van Zant) – 3:33
11. "You Got That Right" (Steve Gaines, Van Zant) – 3:47
12. "All I Can Do Is Write About It" (Acoustic version) (Collins, Van Zant) – 4:24
13. "That Smell" (Collins, Van Zant) – 5:49
14. "Free Bird" (Live) (Collins, Van Zant) – 14:23
- Tracks 1 and 5–7 from Second Helping (1974)
- Tracks 2–3 from (Pronounced 'Lĕh-'nérd 'Skin-'nérd) (1973)
- Track 4 from Nuthin' Fancy (1975)
- Track 8 from Skynyrd's First and... Last (1978)
- Track 9 from Gimme Back My Bullets (1976)
- Tracks 10–11 and 13 from Street Survivors (1977)
- Track 12 from the Lynyrd Skynyrd (Box Set) (1991)
- Track 14 from One More from the Road (1976) and recorded live July 8, 1976, at the Fox Theatre in Atlanta, Georgia

== Charts ==
=== Weekly charts ===
Weekly chart performance for All Time Greatest Hits
Chart (2016–2026)	Peak position
US Billboard 200	38
US Top Rock Albums (Billboard)	8

=== Year-end charts ===
Year-end chart performance for All Time Greatest Hits
Chart (2017)	Position
US Top Rock Albums (Billboard)	86
Chart (2018)	Position
US Top Rock Albums (Billboard)	37
Chart (2019)	Position
US Billboard 200	198
US Top Rock Albums (Billboard)	33
Chart (2020)	Position
US Billboard 200	172
US Top Rock Albums (Billboard)	32
Chart (2021)	Position
US Billboard 200	118
US Top Rock Albums (Billboard)	20
Chart (2022)	Position
US Billboard 200	122
US Top Rock Albums (Billboard)	17
Chart (2023)	Position
US Billboard 200	155
US Top Rock Albums (Billboard)	18
Chart (2024)	Position
US Billboard 200	146
Chart (2025)	Position
US Billboard 200	129

== Certifications ==
Certifications for All Time Greatest Hits
Region	Certification	Certified units/sales
United Kingdom (BPI)	Silver	60,000^{‡}
United States (RIAA)	Platinum	1,000,000^{^}
^{^} Shipments figures based on certification alone.^{‡} Sales+streaming figures based on certification alone.
