= Skynyrd's First and... Last =

Compilation album by Lynyrd Skynyrd
- Released: 5 September 1978
- Recorded: 1971–1972, overdubs 1975–1976
- Studios: Muscle Shoals Sound Studio, Sheffield, AL
- Genre: Southern rock
- Length: 36:36
- Label: MCA
- Producers: Jimmy Johnson, Tim Smith

Lynyrd Skynyrd chronology
Street Survivors (1977)	Skynyrd's First and... Last (1978)	Gold & Platinum (1979)

1998 Re-release cover
- Skynyrd's First: The Complete Muscle Shoals Album

Professional ratings
Review scores
Source	Rating
Allmusic	3/5 stars
Christgau's Record Guide	B
Rolling Stone	(favorable)

Skynyrd's First and... Last was the original name of a posthumous compilation album first released in 1978 by the rock band Lynyrd Skynyrd. In 1998, it was repackaged, renamed and re-released as Skynyrd's First: The Complete Muscle Shoals Album, being expanded to include eight additional tracks—four of which were previously unreleased and four which would be re-recorded for (Pronounced 'Lĕh-'nérd 'Skin-'nérd). As the renamed title suggests, the album was recorded at Muscle Shoals Sound Studio in Alabama. Originally intended to be their debut album it was shelved, making (Pronounced 'Lĕh-'nérd 'Skin-'nérd) their actual debut. The album was certified Gold on September 8, 1978, and Platinum on November 10, 1978, by the RIAA.

The albums contains early band recordings from 1971 and 1972. Many of the tracks are exclusive to these albums, being either otherwise unreleased, or original versions of songs later re-recorded for other studio albums. However, a few of these early tracks were later released on compilation albums, such as Lynyrd Skynyrd Box Set and the German-based Repertoire Records release Old Time Greats in 1997.

== Track listing ==
=== Skynyrd's First and...Last ===
1. "Down South Jukin'" (Gary Rossington, Ronnie Van Zant) - 2:12
2. "Preacher's Daughter" (Rickey Medlocke, Van Zant) - 3:39
3. "White Dove" (Medlocke) - 2:56
4. "Was I Right or Wrong" (Rossington, Van Zant) - 5:21
5. "Lend a Helpin' Hand" (Allen Collins, Rossington, Van Zant) - 4:24
6. "Wino" (Collins, Medlocke, Van Zant) - 3:15
7. "Comin' Home" (Collins, Van Zant) - 5:30
8. "The Seasons" (Medlocke) - 4:09
9. "Things Goin' On" (Original Version) (Rossington, Van Zant) - 5:10

=== Skynyrd's First: The Complete Muscle Shoals Album ===
1. "Free Bird" (Muscle Shoals demo) (Collins, Van Zant) - 7:26
2. "One More Time" (Original Version) (Rossington, Van Zant) - 5:04
3. "Gimme Three Steps" (Original Version) (Collins, Van Zant) - 4:09
4. "Was I Right or Wrong?" (Rossington, Van Zant) - 5:25
5. "Preacher's Daughter" (Medlocke, Van Zant) - 3:40
6. "White Dove" (Medlocke) - 2:58
7. "Down South Jukin'" (Rossington, Van Zant) - 2:14
8. "Wino" (Original Version) (Collins, Medlocke, Van Zant) - 3:16
9. "Simple Man" (Original Version) (Rossington, Van Zant) - 5:25
10. "Trust" (Original Version) (Collins, Van Zant) - 4:14
11. "Comin' Home" (Original Version) (Collins, Van Zant) - 5:30
12. "The Seasons" (Medlocke) - 4:11
13. "Lend a Helpin' Hand" (Collins, Rossington, Van Zant) - 4:22
14. "Things Goin' On" (Original Version) (Rossington, Van Zant) - 5:12
15. "I Ain't the One" (Original Version) (Rossington, Van Zant) - 3:37
16. "You Run Around" (Medlocke) - 5:39
17. "Ain't Too Proud to Pray" (Medlocke) - 5:26

==== Notes on Skynyrd's First ====
- Tracks 2–3, 10 released on the Lynyrd Skynyrd Box Set (1991)
- Tracks 1, 9, 15–17 are previously unreleased
- All the rest are from Skynyrd's First and...Last

== Personnel ==
Lynyrd Skynyrd

- Ronnie Van Zant – lead vocals
- Allen Collins – guitar
- Gary Rossington – guitar
- Billy Powell – piano (1, 11)
- Greg T. Walker – bass (2*, 5, 8, 11, 12, 13, 15–17); backing vocals (2*, 6, 11, 12)
- Larry Junstrom – bass (2*)
- Leon Wilkeson – bass (3, 4, 7, 9, 10, 14); backing vocals (3)
- Rickey Medlocke – drums (1, 2, 5, 8, 11, 12, 13, 15–17); backing vocals (2, 11); lead vocals (6, 12, 16–17); mandolin (12)
- Bob Burns – drums (3, 4, 7, 9, 10, 14)

Additional musicians

- Tim Smith – backing vocals (1, 2, 11)
- Gimmer Nichols – acoustic guitar (6)

1975/76 overdubs

- Ed King – bass (1, 6); guitar (4, 7, 11, 12, 14)
- JoJo Billingsley, Cassie Gaines, Leslie Hawkins – backing vocals (4, 7)
- Wayne Perkins – guitar (5, 7)
- Randy McCormick – Mellotron (6)
- Jimmy R. Johnson – guitar (7)
- Ronnie Eades – saxophone (7)

Notes

- (*) Either Larry Junstrom or Greg T. Walker plays bass on "One More Time".
- All Ed King overdubs were recorded in 1975; the remaining overdubs in 1976.

== Production personnel ==
- Jimmy R. Johnson - producer
- Tim Smith - producer
- Michael Zagaris - photography

== Chart positions ==
Chart (1978)	Peak position
Australian Albums (Kent Music Report)	89
Canada Top Albums/CDs (RPM)	35
UK Albums (Official Charts)	50
US Billboard 200	15

== Certifications ==
Region	Certification	Certified units/sales
United States (RIAA)	Platinum	1,000,000^{^}
^{^} Shipments figures based on certification alone.
