= Freebird... The Movie =

- Directed by: Jeff G. Waxman
- Written by: Sanford Santacroce
- Produced by: Jeff G. Waxman
- Starring: Allen Collins; Steve Gaines; Billy Powell; Artimus Pyle; Gary Rossington; Ronnie Van Zant; Leon Wilkeson; JoJo Billingsley; Cassie Gaines; Leslie Hawkins
- Music by: Lynyrd Skynyrd
- Production company: Cabin Fever Entertainment
- Release date: August 30, 1996
- Running time: 101 minutes
- Country: United States
- Language: English

Freebird... The Movie is an in-depth look at Southern rock band Lynyrd Skynyrd. Released on video on August 30, 1996, it is part documentary and part concert footage. Charlie Daniels was involved as "creative consultant".

The film incorporates live concert and personal footage filmed in 1976 and 1977. It took nearly ten years to assemble and produce.

== Performances ==
The band lineup features Ronnie Van Zant, Steve Gaines, Allen Collins, Gary Rossington, Billy Powell, Leon Wilkeson, and Artimus Pyle.

Most of the footage is from the band's appearance at the Knebworth festival, on August 21, 1976, while the last performance is from a show in Oakland, California.

== Promotion and Release ==
In 1996, they offered a performance to promote the documentary. Bob Burns (who had left Lynyrd Skynyrd in December 1974 due to drumming fatigue) reunited with the band for the performance.

The film debuted at the Fox Theatre in Atlanta, Georgia. The band performed during the last week of 1995 in Atlanta to coincide with the documentary's premiere. On Thursday, Dec 28, they performed for the event Freebird... The Jam. Then the band performed over the weekend for the event Lynyrd Skynyrd: Freebird... The Celebration.

On July 27, 1998 the Lynyrd Skynyrd website announced that producer and distributor Cabin Fever Entertainment had gone out of business and a new company would be re-packaging the documentary. The Freebird Foundation would distribute the videos through the website.

== Soundtrack ==
A soundtrack of the film was released by MCA Records. It was released on August 13, 1996. It included most of the recordings of the performances from the film. However, the soundtrack omits "Gimme Back My Bullets" and "Cry For The Bad Man," both of which were included in the film and recorded on 3/7/76 at Bill Graham's Winterland Ballroom in San Francisco, CA

1. "Workin' for MCA" (Ed King, Ronnie Van Zant)
2. "I Ain't the One" (Gary Rossington, Ronnie Van Zant)
3. "Saturday Night Special" (Ed King, Ronnie Van Zant)
4. "Whiskey Rock-A-Roller" (Ed King, Billy Powell, Ronnie Van Zant)
5. "Travelin' Man" (Leon Wilkeson, Ronnie Van Zant)
6. "Searchin'" (Allen Collins, Ronnie Van Zant)
7. "What's Your Name?" (Gary Rossington, Ronnie Van Zant)
8. "That Smell" (Allen Collins, Ronnie Van Zant)
9. "Gimme Three Steps" (Allen Collins, Ronnie Van Zant)
10. "Call Me the Breeze" (J.J. Cale)
11. "T for Texas (Blue Yodel No.1)" (Jimmie Rodgers)
12. "Sweet Home Alabama" (Ed King, Gary Rossington, Ronnie Van Zant)
13. "Free Bird" (Allen Collins, Ronnie Van Zant)
14. "Dixie" (Traditional)

=== Recording Dates/Locations ===
- Tracks 7–8 recorded 7/13/1977 at the Convention Center in Asbury Park, NJ
- Track 13 recorded 7/2/1977 at the Day on the Green, Oakland Coliseum in Oakland, CA
- All other tracks recorded 8/21/1976 at the Knebworth Festival in Hertfordshire, England

== Reception ==
Bob Cannon of Entertainment Weekly gave the film a B+, writing that the film was "Proof that there was more to Southern rock than boogie and beer," and praised Lynyrd Skynyrd as a "ferocious live act."
