= Don't Ask Me No Questions =

Single by Lynyrd Skynyrd

from the album Second Helping
- B-side: "Take Your Time"
- Released: April 1974
- Recorded: Record Plant Studios, Los Angeles, January 1974
- Genre: Southern rock, blues rock
- Length: 3:27
- Label: MCA Records
- Songwriters: Ronnie Van Zant; Gary Rossington
- Producer: Al Kooper

Lynyrd Skynyrd singles chronology
"Gimme Three Steps" (1973)	"Don't Ask Me No Questions" (1974)	"Sweet Home Alabama" (1974)

"Don't Ask Me No Questions" is a song by American Southern rock band Lynyrd Skynyrd, released on their 1974 album Second Helping. It was written by Gary Rossington and Ronnie Van Zant.

== Content ==
The song is notable for its lyrics and simple guitar riff. Lynyrd Skynyrd, depicting themselves as just working-class musicians who liked making music at the time, were anxious in the world of record companies, managers, and agents. The song is a message to the people who did not want anything to do with the band during their early years, but became demanding when the band became successful. It was written by Rossington and Van Zant during a fishing trip. The song failed to reach chart status; however, their later song "Sweet Home Alabama" achieved worldwide recognition. Buckrail said that "it’s a simple D-C-G progression with chicken-pickin’ hammer-ons and pull-offs".

== Personnel ==
Personnel taken from Second Helping liner notes.

Lynyrd Skynyrd

- Ronnie Van Zant – lead and backing vocals
- Gary Rossington – guitar
- Allen Collins – guitar
- Ed King – slide guitar, bass
- Bob Burns – drums
- Billy Powell – keyboards
- Leon Wilkeson – backing vocals

Additional musicians

- Al Kooper – piano, horn arrangement
- Bobby Keys, Trevor Lawrence & Steve Madiao – horns
