= The Ballad of Curtis Loew =

Song by Lynyrd Skynyrd

from the album Second Helping
- Released: April 15, 1974
- Recorded: Record Plant Studios, Los Angeles, California, January 1974
- Genre: Country rock
- Length: 4:51
- Label: MCA Records
- Songwriters: Allen Collins; Ronnie Van Zant
- Producer: Al Kooper

"The Ballad of Curtis Loew" is a song written by Allen Collins and Ronnie Van Zant and recorded by Lynyrd Skynyrd. The song was first released on the band's 1974 album, Second Helping and again on their compilation, The Essential Lynyrd Skynyrd and later on All Time Greatest Hits. It is on many of their compilation albums and before the Lynyrd Skynyrd plane crash, was performed once live on stage. Ed King says, "The original version of the band only played 'Curtis Loew' one time on stage. We were playing in a basement in some hotel and thought we'd try it. We never played it again until the Tribute Tour with Johnny Van Zant."

== Synopsis ==
A young boy wakes up early and searches for soda bottles to cash in at the local store. He gives the money to an old black man named Curtis Loew, who buys wine and plays blues songs on his old Dobro guitar for the boy all day. The boy often returns to hear Curtis play, despite receiving beatings from his mother; he idolizes Curtis, seeing him as "the finest picker to ever play the blues", and scorns the local people's opinion that he "was useless". When Curtis dies, no one attends his funeral and the narrator laments his passing: "I wish that you was here so everyone would know."

== Origin ==
The "country store" featured in "The Ballad of Curtis Loew".

The band's website says that the song is based on a composite of people who actually lived in the Van Zants' original neighborhood in Jacksonville, Florida. Specifically, the country store "is based on Claude's Midway Grocery on the corner of Plymouth and Lakeshore [Blvd] in Jacksonville." The specific spelling of the surname comes from Ed King writing the liner notes for the Second Helping and deciding to name the bluesman after the Jewish Loew's Theatre. Some of the sources mentioned include Claude H. "Papa" Hammer, Rufus "Tee Tot" Payne, Robert Johnson, and Shorty Medlocke, the grandfather of Rickey Medlocke, Lynyrd Skynyrd's drummer during their 1970 tour and one of the band's current guitarists.

== Personnel ==
Personnel taken from Second Helping liner notes.

Lynyrd Skynyrd

- Ronnie Van Zant – lead vocals
- Gary Rossington – guitar
- Allen Collins – guitar
- Ed King – guitar
- Leon Wilkeson – bass
- Bob Burns – drums
- Billy Powell – keyboards

Additional musician

- Al Kooper – piano, acoustic guitar, backing vocals

== Cover versions ==
- In 2016, Greensky Bluegrass, joined onstage by Jerry Douglas, covered the song at the Telluride Bluegrass Festival.
- The song was covered by country singer Eric Church for the tribute album Sweet Home Alabama: The Country Music Tribute to Lynyrd Skynyrd.
