= Simple Man (Lynyrd Skynyrd song) =

Song by Lynyrd Skynyrd

from the album (Pronounced 'Lĕh-'nérd 'Skin-'nérd)
- Released: August 13, 1973; 53 years ago
- Recorded: April 1973
- Studio: Studio One (Doraville, Georgia)
- Genre: Southern rock; hard rock
- Length: 5:57 (album version); 6:39 (live version)
- Label: Sounds of the South
- Songwriters: Ronnie Van Zant; Gary Rossington
- Producer: Al Kooper

"Simple Man" is a song by American rock band Lynyrd Skynyrd, released on their debut studio album, (Pronounced 'Lĕh-'nérd 'Skin-'nérd) (1973).

The song is one of Lynyrd Skynyrd's most popular. Since the song became available for digital download, it has become Lynyrd Skynyrd's third best-selling digital song after "Sweet Home Alabama" and "Free Bird." It has sold 1,333,000 copies in the U.S. as of November 2013.

== Musical structure ==
"Simple Man" is written in the key of A minor/C major, though all guitars were tuned down a half step, effectively making it A♭ minor/B major. The song begins with an electric arpeggiated chord sequence made up of the chords C major, G major and A minor (though with the tuned-down guitars, effective progression of B major, F♯ major, and A♭ minor). This intro is accompanied by a bass line and cymbals before the drums and vocals come in for the verse. Lyrically, the song is about a mother talking to her child about life, inspired by the passing of Ronnie Van Zant's grandmother, Florence N. Peeples, in November 1971. The chorus of the song includes electric guitars playing variations on the arpeggiated intro progression. The guitar solo is performed by Gary Rossington.

== Personnel ==
Lynyrd Skynyrd

- Ronnie Van Zant – lead vocals
- Gary Rossington – lead guitar
- Allen Collins – rhythm guitar
- Ed King – bass
- Bob Burns – drums
- Billy Powell – keyboards

Additional personnel

- Al Kooper – organ

== Charts ==
Weekly chart performance for "Simple Man"
Chart (2021–2022)	Peak position
New Zealand Hot Singles (RMNZ)	9
US Hot Rock & Alternative Songs (Billboard)	13

== Certifications ==
Certifications and sales for "Simple Man"
Region	Certification	Certified units/sales
Brazil (Pro-Música Brasil)	Gold	30,000^{‡}
New Zealand (RMNZ)	4× Platinum	120,000^{‡}
United Kingdom (BPI) Sales since 2005	Gold	400,000^{‡}
^{‡} Sales+streaming figures based on certification alone.
