= Mr. Banker =

1973 song by Lynyrd Skynyrd

Single by Lynyrd Skynyrd

from the album (Pronounced 'Lĕh-'nérd 'Skin-'nérd) (2001 re-release)
- B-side: "Gimme Three Steps"
- Released: 2001
- Recorded: April 1973, at Studio One in Doraville, Georgia
- Genre: Southern rock
- Length: 5:23
- Label: MCA Records
- Songwriters: Ronnie Van Zant; Gary Rossington; Ed King
- Producer: Al Kooper

"Mr. Banker" is a song by American Southern rock band Lynyrd Skynyrd. It was recorded in early 1973 at Studio One in Doraville, Georgia, and was first released as the B-side of "Gimme Three Steps" (a U.S. single release) in November 1973. It was not featured on any album until the compilation album Legend in 1987. It was later included as a bonus track on the 2001 reissue of the band's debut album, (Pronounced 'Lĕh-'nérd 'Skin-'nérd).

The song was written by Ronnie Van Zant, Gary Rossington, and Ed King.

== Content ==
The song is notable for its lyrics and simple blues guitar riff. The song is sung by Ronnie Van Zant, about a man begging the bank for money to bury his father. The song is not about Van Zant's father, Lacy Van Zant, as some suppose.
