= Christmas Time Again =

Studio album by Lynyrd Skynyrd
- Released: September 12, 2000
- Recorded: 2000
- Genre: Christmas
- Label: CMC International

Lynyrd Skynyrd chronology
All Time Greatest Hits (2000)	Christmas Time Again (2000)	Collectybles (2000)

Christmas Time Again is the eleventh studio album by American Southern rock band Lynyrd Skynyrd, released in 2000.

Professional ratings
Review scores
Source	Rating
AllMusic	2/5 stars

== Track listing ==
1. "Santa's Messin' with the Kid" (Eddie C. Campbell) – 3:15
2. "Rudolph the Red-Nosed Reindeer" (Johnny Marks) – 2:31
3. "Christmas Time Again" (Rickey Medlocke, Dale Krantz Rossington, Gary Rossington, Hughie Thomasson, Johnny Van Zant) – 4:34
4. "Greensleeves" (Traditional) – 2:18
5. "Santa Claus Is Coming to Town" (credited on the album as being performed by Charlie Daniels) (Haven Gillespie) – 3:08
6. "Run Run Rudolph" (Marvin Brodie, Marks) – 3:32
7. "Mama's Song" (Medlocke, G. Rossington, Thomasson, J. Van Zant) – 3:52
8. "Santa Claus Wants Some Lovin'" (Mack Rice) – 3:39
9. "Classical Christmas" (Medlocke, J. Van Zant) – 2:09
10. "Hallelujah, It's Christmas" (credited on the album as being performed by 38 Special) (Don Barnes, Danny Chauncey, Donnie Van Zant) – 4:01
11. "Skynyrd Family" (Medlocke, G. Rossington, Thomasson, J. Van Zant) – 3:00

== Personnel ==
Lynyrd Skynyrd

- Johnny Van Zant – Lead vocals
- Gary Rossington – Guitar
- Billy Powell – Keyboards, piano
- Leon Wilkeson – Bass, background vocals - (credited, but does not appear on the album)
- Rickey Medlocke – Guitars, background vocals
- Hughie Thomasson – Guitars, background vocals
- Michael Cartellone – Drums, percussion
- Dale Krantz-Rossington – Background vocals
- Carol Chase – Background vocals

Additional musicians

- Mike Brignardello – Bass (standing in for Leon Wilkeson)
- Mark Pfaff – Harp (track 1)
- Bill Cuomo – Keyboards (tracks 3,4 & 9)
- Charlie Daniels – Guitar, vocals (track 5)
- Taz DiGregorio – Keyboards (track 5)
- Charlie Hayward – Bass (track 5)
- Pat McDonald – Drums, percussion (track 5)
- Mark Matejka – Guitar, vocals (track 5)
- Chris Wormer – Guitar, vocals (track 5)
- Danny Chauncey (credited as being part of 38 Special, instrument(s) played not noted)
- Don Barnes (credited as being part of 38 Special, instrument(s) played not noted)
- Donnie Van Zant (credited as being part of 38 Special, instrument(s) played not noted)

== Charts ==
Chart (2000)	Peak position
US Billboard 200	38
