= Leonard Skinner =

American teacher (1933–2010)

- Born: Forby Leonard Skinner; January 11, 1933; Jacksonville, Florida, U.S.
- Died: September 20, 2010 (aged 77); Jacksonville, Florida, U.S.
- Education: Florida State University
- Occupations: High school gym teacher, realtor, bar owner
- Known for: Namesake of rock band Lynyrd Skynyrd

Forby Leonard Skinner (January 11, 1933 – September 20, 2010) was an American high school gym teacher, basketball coach, and businessman from Jacksonville, Florida. He is known in popular culture as the eponym of the rock band Lynyrd Skynyrd; Skinner was the band members' teacher.

== Biography ==
Skinner was born in Jacksonville, Florida, in 1933 and graduated from Robert E. Lee High School in 1951. He attended Jacksonville Junior College on a basketball scholarship before being drafted into the U.S. Army. After his discharge from the Army, Skinner attended Florida State University, where he graduated in 1957.

For many years, Skinner was a gym teacher at his alma mater, Robert E. Lee High School. Before coaching at Robert E. Lee, he taught at Glynn Academy in Glynn County, Georgia. He was also a basketball coach at Stillwell Jr. High in Jacksonville. Several members of the band Lynyrd Skynyrd, including Ronnie Van Zant, Gary Rossington, and Bob Burns, were students at Robert E. Lee in the 1960s. Skinner's strict enforcement of a policy against long hair inspired the members to name their band after him. Skinner maintained that he was merely enforcing the school policy. Several members of the band would try to slick their hair down with Vaseline, as students were required to shower after gym. At that point, it was readily revealed that their hair was longer than regulation. The group reportedly changed their name after Skinner sent Rossington and others to the principal's office for wearing their hair too long. Over time, Burns, Rossington, and other band members developed a series of running in-jokes about Skinner and ultimately decided to pay "tongue-in-cheek homage" to him by renaming themselves "Lynyrd Skynyrd". In 1977, an Associated Press article described the band's connection to their gym teacher as follows:

It seems a physical education teacher named Leonard Skinner didn't cotton to long hair or loud music. A run-in with him helped get the boys suspended. As a way of getting back, they named the band for Skinner, changing the vowels to avoid a lawsuit and becoming famous enough to make the story a rock legend.

Interviewed in January 2009, Skinner said he was just following the rules about hair length. It bothered him that the legend had grown that he was particularly tough on the band members or that he had them kicked out of school. He said, "It was against the school rules. I don't particularly like long hair on men, but again, it wasn't my rule." At the same time, Skinner told The Times-Union of Jacksonville, "They were good, talented, hard-working boys. They worked hard, lived hard, and boozed hard." Skinner's son said, "I think he kind of ate it up. He didn't like it at first, he had mixed emotions later, but I think he kind of liked it eventually."

Skinner later taught at Jacksonville Technical High School and retired from coaching in 1970. He worked in the real estate business during the 1970s, and in 1975, he allowed the band to use a photo of his "Leonard Skinner Realty" sign for the inside of their third album, Nuthin' Fancy. After the album was released, Skinner began receiving late-night calls from around the country from fans who had seen the sign (and phone number) in the album artwork. Skinner recalled, "They'd say, 'Who's speaking', and I'd say Leonard Skinner, and they'd say 'Far out!' which it really wasn't at four in the morning."

Skinner became friends with some members of the band, and they played at a bar that Skinner opened in Jacksonville called "The Still". Skinner also named a couple of bars after himself, capitalizing on the fame of the name.

In January 2009, the people of Jacksonville held an event called "A Tribute to Coach Leonard Skinner & Southern Rock" at the National Guard Armory. At the time, the Jacksonville newspaper wrote, "He was just a regular Westside guy, a coach and businessman with a strong code of honor, a disciplinarian at home and at school."

On September 20, 2010, Skinner died at age 77 in a nursing home in Jacksonville, having suffered from Alzheimer's disease for several years. At the time of his death, The New York Times called him "arguably the most influential high school gym teacher in American popular culture." The Florida Times-Union called him "the no-nonsense, flattopped basketball coach and gym teacher whose name is forever linked with Jacksonville's legendary Lynyrd Skynyrd."
