= Ronnie Van Zant Memorial Park =

Park in Asbury Lake, Florida, US

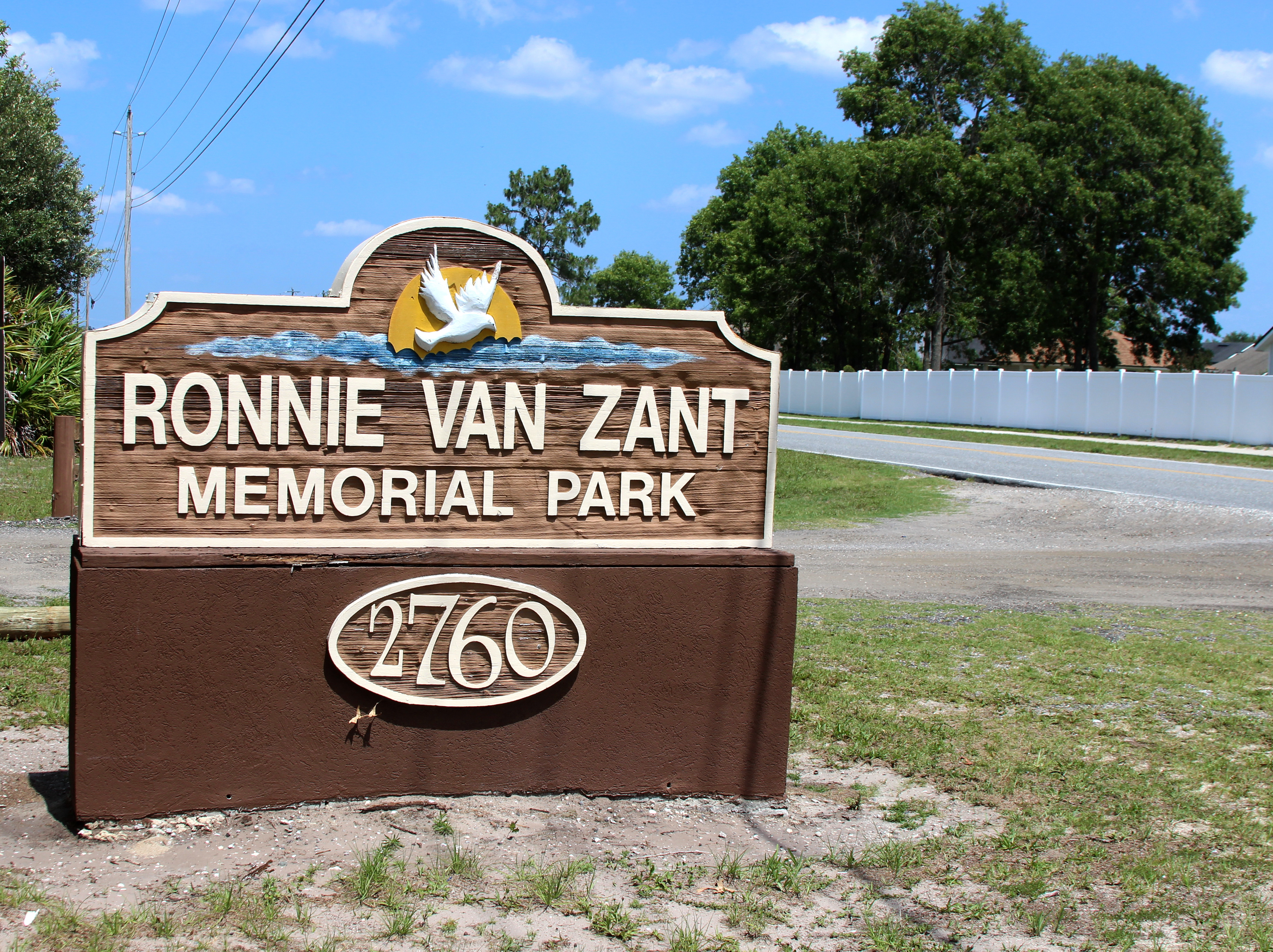
- Interactive map of Ronnie Van Zant Memorial Park
- Type: Municipal (Lake Asbury, Florida)
- Location: Lake Asbury, Florida
- Coordinates: 30.051°N 81.795°W
- Area: 90 acres (0 km^{2})
- Created: 1996
- Operator: Freebird Foundation (Private), Clay County Board of County Commissioners (Public)
- Status: Active

The Ronnie Van Zant Memorial Park is a public memorial park located in Lake Asbury, Clay County, Florida. The park was built in memory of Ronnie Van Zant, vocalist of Southern rock group Lynyrd Skynyrd, who died along with numerous other band members and crew in a 1977 plane crash. The park was funded by fans and family of the band, and features a number of facilities including tennis courts, fishing ponds, a disc golf course and picnic areas, among other amenities.

== Sources ==
- Official website
- Clay County Parks Website
