= Lynyrd Skynyrd: I'll Never Forget You =

Book by Gene Odom

- Author: Gene Odom
- Publication date: April 1, 1982

Lynyrd Skynyrd: I'll Never Forget You is a book written by former Lynyrd Skynyrd bodyguard Gene Odom. It details the childhood memories Gene shared with Lynyrd Skynyrd vocalist Ronnie Van Zant. It was followed by another book co-written with Frank Dorman, entitled "Lynyrd Skynyrd: Remembering the Free Birds of Southern Rock".
