= JoJo Billingsley =

American musician (1952–2010)

- Also known as: Deborah Jo White
- Born: Deborah Jo Billingsley; May 28, 1952; Memphis, Tennessee, U.S.
- Died: June 24, 2010 (aged 58)
- Occupation: singer
- Years active: 1970s–2000s
- Spouse: Timothy White

Deborah Jo Billingsley (May 28, 1952 – June 24, 2010) was an American singer, songwriter and recording artist. She was best known for her work with the Honkettes, backing vocalists for Lynyrd Skynyrd.

== Lynyrd Skynyrd ==
Billingsley was born in Memphis, Tennessee, United States, to Doc and Hazel Billingsley. The family soon moved to Senatobia, Mississippi from Harmontown, Mississippi, where she was raised. In December 1975 she was hired, along with Cassie Gaines and Leslie Hawkins, as backing singers for the Southern rock band Lynyrd Skynyrd, whose leader, Ronnie Van Zant, dubbed them "The Honkettes".

An October 20, 1977 airplane crash killed several members of the band and road crew, but Billingsley was the only band member not on the flight. At the time, she was under a doctor's care in Senatobia, Mississippi, dealing with health problems brought about by substance abuse. According to Billingsley, this experience led her to become a born-again Christian.

Between 2005 and 2006 - JoJo Billingsley, Leslie Hawkins, Artimus Pyle, Ed King and Bob Burns reunited to play a dozen shows in a band called The Saturday Night Special Band, with their good friend and former bandmate, Mark Basile from New York to raise awareness for UNOS, an organ donor charitable organization. The band also featured, George Festo, Jaime Sepe, Eric Tolnes and Mike DesRoches. The SNS Band has several live shows recorded on YouTube.

== Performances ==
Billingsley did not perform with a re-formed Lynyrd Skynyrd after the 1977 plane crash at Charlie Daniels' 1979 Volunteer Jam, because she was not invited. She was at the opening of Freebird The Movie at Atlanta's Fox Theatre in 1995. She sang "Sweet Home Alabama" at Lynyrd Skynyrd's induction into the Rock and Roll Hall of Fame in 2006. She also performed with members of the group at occasional charity or memorial events.

In 2005, she was called upon by her friend and former bandmate, Mark Basile, a guitarist from New York, who invited her to perform with Leslie Hawkins several times as "The Honkettes" in an alternative version of Lynyrd Skynyrd called "The Saturday Night Special Band", that included former Skynyrd members Ed King, Artimus Pyle and Leslie Hawkins, which helped raise money for UNOS and Hurricane Katrina victims. Billingsley, Hawkins and newcomer Donna Basile, referred to as the 4th Honkette by Hawkins, Billingsley and King, rounded out the Honkettes.

In 2007, Billingsley appeared at Jam-A-Que (a Southern rock get-together held by Bruce Wall) with members of Southern Boys Band, Bruce Wall, and Scott Braswell at Pleasant Shade, Tennessee. Her friend Jane Van Zant was also there.

Billingsley also made many television and radio appearances, appeared in several movies and DVDs, and traveled extensively. Her final CD was titled I Will Obey.

== Personal life ==
Billingsley lived with her husband, Tim, and her daughter, Destiny, in Cullman, Alabama, where they attended Spirit Life Church. Her son, Justin, is in the US Navy.

Billingsley died in Cullman on June 24, 2010, from cancer at the age of 58.
