= Jimmie Van Zant =

American singer

Jimmie Van Zant (December 22, 1957 – April 7, 2016) was an American singer, songwriter, and guitarist. He was named after his mother's current husband at the time, Jim Nightingale; When his mother married Alfred Kelsay in 1970 he was adopted soon after at the age of 12 and his surname was changed to Kelsay.

He was born in Jacksonville, Florida, the son of E. C. Van Zant. Jimmie was the cousin of musicians Donnie, Johnny, and Ronnie Van Zant (E.C. Van Zant was Lacy Van Zant's brother. Lacy was Ronnie, Donnie, and Jonny's father). He adopted his father's name, Van Zant when he went into music. He began playing guitar and piano as a child, mentored by his cousin Ronnie Van Zant, but largely gave up music until the 1977 plane crash in which Ronnie, the founder and lead singer of Lynyrd Skynyrd, was killed. Jimmie Van Zant then took up a career playing Southern rock music, and performed at festivals and Harley Davidson shows before recording the albums The Jimmie Van Zant Band (1996) and Southern Comfort (2000). He toured widely with his band, performing over 200 shows each year, and released a third album, Feels Like Freedom, in 2012.

His wife Zohra often performed with him. He died in a hospice in Florida in 2016, aged 58, after several years of treatment for liver cancer.
