= Second Helping =

Studio album by Lynyrd Skynyrd
- Released: April 15, 1974
- Recorded: June 1973 (Note: Track 1) – January 1974
- Studios: Studio One, Doraville, Georgia (track 1); Record Plant Studios, Los Angeles, California
- Genres: Southern rock; blues rock; boogie rock; hard rock
- Length: 37:15
- Labels: Sounds of the South; MCA
- Producer: Al Kooper

Lynyrd Skynyrd chronology
(Pronounced 'Lĕh-'nérd 'Skin-'nérd) (1973)	Second Helping (1974)	Nuthin' Fancy (1975)

Singles from Second Helping
- 1. "Don't Ask Me No Questions" Released: April 1974; 2. "Sweet Home Alabama" Released: June 24, 1974

Second Helping is the second studio album by Lynyrd Skynyrd, released on April 15, 1974. It features the band's biggest hit single, "Sweet Home Alabama", an answer song to Neil Young's "Alabama" and "Southern Man", which reached No. 8 on the Billboard Hot 100 chart in August 1974.

Second Helping reached No. 12 on the Billboard album charts. The RIAA certified it Gold on September 20, 1974, and Double Platinum on July 21, 1987.

== Background ==
After the success of their debut album, (Pronounced 'Lĕh-'nérd 'Skin-'nérd), Lynyrd Skynyrd's fan base continued to grow rapidly throughout 1973, largely due to their opening slot on the Who's Quadrophenia tour in the United States. Second Helping features Ed King, Allen Collins, and Gary Rossington all collaborating with Ronnie Van Zant on the songwriting, and cemented the band's breakthrough.

== Critical reception ==
Professional ratings
Review scores
Source	Rating
AllMusic	5/5 stars
Christgau's Record Guide	A−
Creem	B−
Rolling Stone	(favourable)
Encyclopedia of Popular Music	4/5 stars
MusicHound Rock	3.5/5
The Rolling Stone Album Guide	4/5 stars
The New Rolling Stone Album Guide	4/5 stars
Tom Hull	B−

Reviewing for Rolling Stone in 1974, Gordon Fletcher said Lynyrd Skynyrd performs a consistent style of Southern music-influenced blues rock similar to the Allman Brothers Band, but lacks their "sophistication and professionalism. If a song doesn't feel right to the Brothers, they work on it until it does; if it isn't right to Lynyrd Skynyrd, they are more likely to crank up their amps and blast their way through the bottleneck." Fletcher concluded Second Helping is distinct from (Pronounced 'Lĕh-'nérd 'Skin-'nérd) "only by a certain mellowing out that indicates they may eventually acquire a level of savoirfaire to realize their many capabilities".

Robert Christgau in Creem was also indifferent, saying Lynyrd Skynyrd is "still a substantial, tasteful band, but I have a hunch they blew their best stuff on the first platter." Christgau warmed to the album later, reappraising it in Christgau's Record Guide: Rock Albums of the Seventies (1981). He observed "infectious putdowns of rock businessmen, rock journalists, and heroin", and "great formula" in general: "When it rocks, three guitarists and a keyboard player pile elementary riffs and feedback noises into dense combinations broken by preplanned solos, while at quieter moments the spare vocabulary of the best Southern folk music is evoked or just plain duplicated."

In a retrospective review for AllMusic, Stephen Thomas Erlewine stated that Second Helping "replicated all the strengths" of the first album's expert Southern rock "but was a little tighter and a little more professional." Houston Press placed it No. 2 on its list of "Five Essential Boogie-Rock Albums."

== Track listing ==
Side one
No.	Title	Writer(s)	Length
1.	"Sweet Home Alabama"	Ed King; Gary Rossington; Ronnie Van Zant	4:43
2.	"I Need You"	King; Rossington; Van Zant	6:55
3.	"Don't Ask Me No Questions"	Rossington; Van Zant	3:29
4.	"Workin' for MCA"	King; Van Zant	4:49

Side two
No.	Title	Writer(s)	Length
1.	"The Ballad of Curtis Loew"	Allen Collins; Van Zant	4:51
2.	"Swamp Music"	King; Van Zant	3:31
3.	"The Needle and the Spoon"	Collins; Van Zant	3:53
4.	"Call Me the Breeze"	J. J. Cale	5:09

- Sides one and two were combined as tracks 1–8 on CD reissues.

1997 CD reissue bonus tracks
No.	Title	Writer(s)	Length
9.	"Don't Ask Me No Questions" (Single Version)	Rossington; Van Zant	3:31
10.	"Was I Right Or Wrong" (Demo)	Van Zant; Rossington	5:33
11.	"Take Your Time" (Demo)	Van Zant; King	7:29

- Track 9 previously released as the band's lead single in April 1974
- Track 10 previously unreleased
- Track 11 previously released on Legend

== Personnel ==
Lynyrd Skynyrd

- Ronnie Van Zant – lead vocals
- Gary Rossington – guitar
- Allen Collins – guitar
- Ed King – guitar, backing vocals, bass on "I Need You" and "Don't Ask Me No Questions"
- Leon Wilkeson – bass (all tracks except "I Need You" and "Don't Ask Me No Questions"), backing vocals
- Bob Burns – drums, except "I Need You"
- Billy Powell – keyboards

Additional personnel

- Mike Porter – drums on "I Need You"
- Merry Clayton, Clydie King, and Sherlie Matthews – background vocals on "Sweet Home Alabama"
- Bobby Keys, Trevor Lawrence, and Steve Madaio – horns on "Don't Ask Me No Questions" and "Call Me the Breeze"
- Al Kooper – backing vocals, piano on "Don't Ask Me No Questions" and "The Ballad of Curtis Loew", acoustic guitar on "The Ballad of Curtis Loew"

== Charts ==
Chart (1974)	Peak position
Canada Top Albums/CDs (RPM)	9
US Billboard 200	12

== Certifications ==
Region	Certification	Certified units/sales
New Zealand (RMNZ)	Platinum	15,000^{‡}
United States (RIAA)	2× Platinum	2,000,000^{^}
^{^} Shipments figures based on certification alone.^{‡} Sales+streaming figures based on certification alone.
