= Gimme Three Steps =

1973 single by Lynyrd Skynyrd

Single by Lynyrd Skynyrd

from the album (Pronounced 'Lĕh-'nérd 'Skin-'nérd)
- B-side: "Mr. Banker"
- Released: November 1973
- Recorded: March 29, 1973
- Studio: Studio One, Doraville, Georgia
- Genre: Southern rock
- Length: 3:17 (single version), 4:26 (album version)
- Label: MCA
- Songwriters: Ronnie Van Zant, Allen Collins
- Producer: Al Kooper

Lynyrd Skynyrd singles chronology
"I've Been Your Fool" (1971)	"Gimme Three Steps" (1973)	"Don't Ask Me No Questions (remix)" (1974)

Live video
- "Gimme Three Steps" on YouTube

"Gimme Three Steps" is a song by American southern rock band Lynyrd Skynyrd, released from the band's debut album, (Pronounced 'Lĕh-'nérd 'Skin-'nérd) (1973). It was written by bandmates Allen Collins and Ronnie Van Zant.

The single release contains the song "Mr. Banker" as a B-side.

== Composition, lyrics and reception ==
Band member Gary Rossington based the lyrics on a real-life experience Ronnie Van Zant had at a bar in Jacksonville, Florida, having a gun pulled on him for dancing with another man's woman. While the narrator dances with a girl named Linda Lou at a bar called The Jug, a man (either the girl's boyfriend or husband) armed with a .44 revolver enters and catches them, angrily believing her to be cheating and threatening the narrator's life. In the chorus, the narrator protests that he has not even kissed Linda Lou and begs the man to give him a head start out of the bar: "Won't you give me three steps / Gimme three steps, mister / Gimme three steps towards the door? / Gimme three steps / Gimme three steps, mister / And you'll never see me no more." When the man turns to shout at Linda Lou, the narrator takes advantage of the distraction and runs out.

Of the live single released in 1977, Cash Box said it is "a traditional rock and roller, featuring some tight harmony vocals and the obligatory high-distortion guitar solo." Record World said that "the triple pronged guitar attack and Ronnie Van Zant's vocal have never sounded better."

== Personnel ==
Personnel according to the album's liner notes.

Lynyrd Skynyrd

- Ronnie Van Zant – vocals
- Gary Rossington – lead guitar
- Allen Collins – rhythm guitar
- Ed King – bass
- Billy Powell – keyboards
- Bob Burns – drums

Additional musician

- Bobbye Hall – percussion
