= What's Your Name (Lynyrd Skynyrd song) =

Single by Lynyrd Skynyrd

from the album Street Survivors
- B-side: "I Know a Little"
- Released: November 1977
- Recorded: 1977
- Genre: Southern rock
- Length: 3:31
- Label: MCA
- Songwriters: Gary Rossington, Ronnie Van Zant
- Producer: Tom Dowd

Lynyrd Skynyrd singles chronology
"Free Bird (live)" (1976)	"What's Your Name" (1977)	"You Got That Right" (1978)

"What's Your Name" is a Southern rock song by Lynyrd Skynyrd, the opening track on their album Street Survivors. It peaked at No. 13 on the U.S. Billboard Hot 100 and No. 6 in Canada.

== Background ==
Lynyrd Skynyrd lead vocalist Ronnie Van Zant and guitarist Gary Rossington wrote "What's Your Name" while in Miami with producer Tom Dowd and Booker T. & the M.G.'s guitarist Steve Cropper. The lyrics depict life on tour for a band and its entourage, and one of the verses is based on a true story of the band drinking at their hotel bar during a tour when one of their roadies got into a fight. The band got kicked out of the bar, but they went into another room and ordered champagne. However, unlike the song suggests, the incident did not happen in the city of Boise, Idaho. Instead, when Van Zant found out that the band 38 Special (led by his younger brother Donnie) was starting its first national tour in that city, the lyric was changed.

== Reception ==
Billboard praised the "strong, accessible melody" and the "excellent instrumentation." Cash Box said that it "tells the standard 'rock and rollers on the road' story with a punchy lyric and a rousing beat." Record World said that "it rocks with authority, powered by a driving brass section and Van Zant's ironic vocal work."

== Music video ==
The music video, released after the plane crash that killed several band members, depicts Ronnie's brother Johnny along with a newly reformed Lynyrd Skynyrd live in concert (presumably at the Pensacola Civic Center as the video suggests). Interspersed within are shots of the road crew setting up for the show and the musicians tuning their instruments, having makeup done, meeting with fans, autographing albums and playing baseball together. At the end of the video, a hat in the style of Ronnie's trademark "High Roller" look is seen atop a microphone stand as a tribute to him.

== Chart performance ==
Chart (1977–1978)	Peak position
Canada RPM Top Singles	6
U.S. Billboard Hot 100	13
U.S. Cash Box Top 100	7

=== Year-end charts ===
Chart (1978)	Rank
Canada	46
US Billboard Hot 100	70
US Cash Box	51

== In other media ==
The song was made available to download on November 30, 2010 for use in the Rock Band 3 music gaming platform in both Basic and Pro mode, the latter of which takes advantage of the use of a real guitar or bass guitar and MIDI-compatible electronic drum kits and keyboards in addition to three-part harmony vocals.
