= Southern Man (song) =

1970 song by Neil Young

Song by Neil Young

from the album After the Gold Rush
- Released: September 19, 1970
- Recorded: March 19, 1970
- Studio: Neil Young's home, Topanga, California
- Genre: Folk rock
- Length: 5:41
- Label: Reprise
- Songwriter: Neil Young
- Producer: David Briggs

"Southern Man" is a song by Canadian-American singer-songwriter Neil Young, from his album After the Gold Rush, released in 1970. An extended live version can be heard on the Crosby Stills Nash & Young album 4 Way Street.

== Description ==
"Southern Man" has been described as an "emotionally moving folk-rock protest against racial injustices."

The lyrics of the song describe the racism against Black people in the American South. In the song, Young tells the story of a white man (symbolically the entire white South) and his slaves. Young pleadingly asks when the South will make amends for the fortunes built through slavery when he sings:

I saw cotton and I saw black,
tall white mansions and little shacks.
Southern Man, when will you pay them back?

The song also mentions the practice of cross burning referencing the Ku Klux Klan.

Young was very sensitive about the song's message of anti-racism and anti-violence. During his 1973 tour, he canceled a show in Oakland, California, because a fan was beaten and removed from the stage by a guard while the song was played.

== Response ==
Southern rock band Lynyrd Skynyrd wrote their song "Sweet Home Alabama" in response to "Southern Man" and "Alabama" from Young's 1972 album Harvest. Young has said that he is a fan of both "Sweet Home Alabama" and Ronnie Van Zant, the lead vocalist for Lynyrd Skynyrd. "They play like they mean it," Young said in 1976. "I'm proud to have my name in a song like theirs." Young has also been known to play "Sweet Home Alabama" in concert occasionally. To demonstrate this camaraderie, Van Zant frequently wore a Neil Young Tonight's the Night T-shirt while performing "Sweet Home Alabama". Crazy Horse bassist Billy Talbot can often be seen reciprocating by wearing a Jack Daniel's-styled Lynyrd Skynyrd T-shirt (including at the Live Rust concert).

Warren Zevon's 1980 song "Play it All Night Long" is seen as a reaction to the perceived feud between "Southern Man" and "Sweet Home Alabama", as stated by Far Out Magazine in a 2024 piece: "Zevon's 'Play It All Night Long' was his tongue-in-cheek way of basically saying, 'Who cares? It's a pointless feud, and both songs suck anyway.'" Young would eventually collaborate with Zevon on his albums Sentimental Hygiene and Transverse City.

In his book Waging Heavy Peace: A Hippie Dream, Young stated that Lynyrd Skynyrd wrote "Sweet Home Alabama" not in response to "Southern Man", but rather to Young's song "Alabama". Young noted that Lynyrd Skynyrd's implied criticism was deserved because Young's lyrics on "Alabama" were condescending and accusatory. However, a sample of "Southern Man" can be heard in the recording of "Sweet Home Alabama" at approximately the 55 second mark.

== Personnel ==
- Neil Young – guitar, vocals
- Nils Lofgren – piano, vocals
- Greg Reeves – bass
- Ralph Molina – drums, vocals
- Danny Whitten – vocals

== Other versions ==
- Merry Clayton's version of the song appeared on her self-titled 1971 album. She later performed backing vocals on "Sweet Home Alabama", after some personal conflict.
- Sylvester and the Hot Band released a funk version of the song as their debut single, from their 1973 self-titled debut album.
- David Allan Coe covered the song on his 1985 album Unchained.
- The Dave Clark Five's version was released in 1971 as a single. It also appeared on their Dave Clark & Friends album.
- Morse/Portnoy/George included this song in a medley with "The Needle and the Damage Done" and "Cinnamon Girl" on their album Cover 2 Cover.
