= Lake Asbury, Florida =

Lake Asbury, Florida Asbury Lake
- Census-designated place
- Location of Asbury Lake in Clay County, Florida.
- Coordinates: 30°02′31″N 81°45′45″W
- Country: United States
- State: Florida
- County: Clay

Area
  - Total: 17.23 sq mi (44.63 km^{2})
  - Land: 16.96 sq mi (43.93 km^{2})
  - Water: 0.27 sq mi (0.70 km^{2})
- Elevation: 30 ft (9.1 m)

Population (2020)
  - Total: 11,036
  - Density: 650.6/sq mi (251.21/km^{2})
- Time zone: UTC-5 (Eastern (EST))
  - Summer (DST): UTC-4 (EDT)
- FIPS code: 12-02187
- GNIS feature ID: 2402652

Lake Asbury is an unincorporated community and census-designated place (CDP) in Clay County, Florida, United States. It is referred to as the Asbury Lake CDP by the U.S. Census Bureau. The population at the 2020 census was 11,036, up from 8,700 at the 2010 census. It is part of the Jacksonville, Florida Metropolitan Statistical Area.

== Geography ==
Lake Asbury is located north of the center of Clay County. The community surrounds a small reservoir of the same name, though it has also recently expanded eastward. It is bordered on the north by Black Creek, a tributary of the St. Johns River. The community is 13 miles (21 km) southwest of Orange Park and 30 miles (48 km) southwest of downtown Jacksonville.

According to the United States Census Bureau, the CDP has a total area of 17.3 square miles (44.8 km^{2}), of which 17.0 square miles (44.1 km^{2}) is land and 0.27 square miles (0.7 km^{2}), or 1.56%, is water.

== Demographics ==
Historical population
Census	Pop.	Note	%±
1990	2,072		—
2000	2,228		7.5%
2010	8,700		290.5%
2020	11,036		26.9%
U.S. Decennial Census

As of the census of 2010, there were 8,700 people, 2,848 households, and 2,450 families residing in the CDP, a 290% increase from 2000. The population density was 2,417.6 inhabitants per square mile (933.4/km^{2}). There were 3,048 housing units at an average density of 846.6 units per square mile (326.9 units/km^{2}). The racial makeup of the CDP was 88.8% White, 5.7% African American, 0.5% Native American, 1.3% Asian, 1.1% from other races, and 2.4% from two or more races. Hispanic or Latino of any race were 7.0% of the population.

There were 799 households, out of which 30.7% had children under the age of 18 living with them, 80.0% were married couples living together, 5.4% had a female householder with no husband present, and 12.6% were non-families. 10.1% of all households were made up of individuals, and 5.1% had someone living alone who was 65 years of age or older. The average household size was 2.79 and the average family size was 2.98.

In the CDP, the population was spread out, with 22.5% under the age of 18, 5.9% from 18 to 24, 23.9% from 25 to 44, 35.5% from 45 to 64, and 12.2% who were 65 years of age or older. The median age was 44 years. For every 100 females, there were 101.8 males. For every 100 females age 18 and over, there were 98.3 males.

The median income for a household in the CDP was $65,476, and the median income for a family was $70,278. Males had a median income of $47,000 versus $30,167 for females. The per capita income for the CDP was $26,398. About 4.2% of families and 3.8% of the population were below the poverty line, including 2.2% of those under age 18 and 4.9% of those age 65 or over.
