= Cassie Gaines =

American singer (1948–1977)

- Born: January 9, 1948; Miami, Oklahoma, U.S.
- Died: October 20, 1977 (aged 29) Gillsburg, Mississippi, U.S.
- Genre: Southern rock
- Occupation: Singer
- Years active: 1975–1977
- Formerly of: Lynyrd Skynyrd

Cassie LaRue Gaines (January 9, 1948 – October 20, 1977) was an American singer, best known for her work with Southern rock band Lynyrd Skynyrd.

== Biography ==
Gaines was invited by JoJo Billingsley and Ronnie Van Zant to join Lynyrd Skynyrd as a backup singer. She had never heard of the band at the time, so Billingsley lent her a copy of the band's first two albums: (Pronounced 'Lĕh-'nérd 'Skin-'nérd) and Second Helping. In late 1975, Gaines, Billingsley, and Leslie Hawkins formed The Honkettes, a female gospel vocal trio for Skynyrd.

When Lynyrd Skynyrd was in need of a guitar player to replace recently departed Ed King, Cassie recommended her younger brother, Steve, who joined the band soon after.

=== Plane crash and death ===
On October 20, 1977, a Convair CV-240 carrying the band between shows from Greenville, South Carolina to Baton Rouge, Louisiana crashed outside of Gillsburg, Mississippi. The crash killed Ronnie Van Zant, Steve and Cassie Gaines, assistant road manager Dean Kilpatrick, as well as pilot Walter McCreary and co-pilot William Gray. Though Cassie Gaines initially refused to board the flight, she was — against her better judgment — convinced to do so by other passengers. Her hesitation was due to a small fire in one of the engines the previous day. She intended to travel in the tour trucks but boarded the flight due to Van Zant's persuasion.

Gaines survived the initial accident but bled to death while rescuers attempted to reach the accident site and remove victims for medical treatment. According to controversial claims by survivor Billy Powell, Gaines bled to death after the accident in Powell's arms due to deep lacerations.
