= Free Bird =

1974 single by Lynyrd Skynyrd

- US single of the shortened studio recording

Single by Lynyrd Skynyrd

from the album (Pronounced 'Lĕh-'nérd 'Skin-'nérd)
- B-side: "Down South Jukin'"
- Released: November 1974
- Recorded: April 3, 1973
- Studio: Studio One, Doraville, Georgia, U.S.
- Genre: Southern rock; hard rock; arena rock
- Length: 9:08 (album version); 4:41 (single version); 10:07 (Skynyrd's Innyrds version)
- Label: MCA
- Songwriters: Allen Collins; Ronnie Van Zant
- Producer: Al Kooper

Lynyrd Skynyrd singles chronology
"Sweet Home Alabama" (1974)	"Free Bird" (1974)	"Saturday Night Special" (1975)

Audio
- "Free Bird" (album version) on YouTube

"Free Bird", also spelled as one word "Freebird", is a song by American rock band Lynyrd Skynyrd, written by guitarist Allen Collins and lead singer Ronnie Van Zant. The song was released on their 1973 debut studio album. Released as a single in November 1974, "Free Bird" debuted on the US Billboard Hot 100 on November 23 at No. 87 and became the band's second Top 40 hit in early 1975, peaking at No. 19 on January 25. A live version of the song, recorded at Atlanta's Fox Theater and included on the album One More from the Road, re-entered the charts in late 1976, eventually peaking at No. 38 in January 1977.

"Free Bird" achieved No. 3 on Guitar World's list of greatest guitar solos of all time in 2010 and 2016, while placing at No. 8 in their rankings by 2022. It is Lynyrd Skynyrd's signature song, the finale during live performances, and their longest song, often going well over 14 minutes when played live. "Free Bird" was once the most requested song on FM radio, and remains a staple on classic rock stations.

== Origins ==
According to guitarist Gary Rossington, for two years after Allen Collins wrote the initial chords, vocalist Ronnie Van Zant insisted that there were too many for him to create a melody in the belief that the melody needed to change alongside the chords. After Collins played the unused sequence at rehearsal one day, Van Zant asked him to repeat it, then wrote out the melody and lyrics in three or four minutes. The guitar solos that finish the song were added originally to give Van Zant a chance to rest, as the band was playing several sets per night at clubs at the time. Soon afterward, the band learned piano-playing roadie Billy Powell had written an introduction to the song; upon hearing it, they included it as the finishing touch and had him formally join as their keyboardist.

In subsequent interviews, Gary Rossington stated that the record company executives initially felt the song was too long and "wouldn't get any airplay", and that it "needed to be shortened to 3 or 3-1/2 minutes for radio". Also, the band was told, "Why would you ruin a pretty song like that with a wild 'LSD-type' ending?" Rossington stated that the band refused to change the length of the song and that "we weren't changing our ways, hell no".

Allen Collins's girlfriend, Kathy, whom he later married, asked him, "If I leave here tomorrow, would you still remember me?" Collins noted the question and it eventually became the opening line of "Free Bird." Also, in an interview filmed during a fishing outing on a boat with Gary Rossington, an interviewer asked Ronnie Van Zant what the song meant. Van Zant replied that in essence, that the song is "what it means to be free, in that a bird can fly wherever he wants to go." He further stated that "everyone wants to be free...that's what this country's all about."

The song is dedicated to the memory of Duane Allman by the band in their live shows. During their 1975 performance on The Old Grey Whistle Test, Van Zant dedicated the song to Allman and Berry Oakley, commenting, "they're both free birds".

During the 1987–1988 Lynyrd Skynyrd Tribute Tour, the band played "Free Bird" as an instrumental. Johnny Van Zant first sang the song on its Lynyrd Skynyrd 1991 Tour in Baton Rouge, where the band had been headed in 1977 when several members (including his older brother Ronnie) were killed in a plane crash.

== Reception ==
Upon the single release, Record World said that the band "sees this country-tinged tune soar to further feather their hit nest."

"Free Bird" is included in The Rock and Roll Hall of Fame's 500 Songs that Shaped Rock and Roll and at number 407 in Rolling Stone's 500 Greatest Songs of All Time. In 2009, it was named the 26th best hard rock song of all time by VH1.

In 2008, the 1973 recording of "Free Bird" from the Lynyrd Skynyrd (Pronounced 'Lĕh-'nerd 'Skin-'nerd) album on MCA Records was inducted into the Grammy Hall of Fame.

== Legacy ==
On Skynyrd's first live album, 1976's One More from the Road, Van Zant can be heard asking the crowd, "What song is it you want to hear?" The calls for "Free Bird" led into a fourteen-and-a-half-minute rendition of the song. It has become something of a humorous tradition for audience members at concerts to shout "Free Bird!" as a request to hear the song, regardless of the performer or style of music. For example, during Nirvana's 1993 MTV Unplugged in New York show, a shout-out for "Free Bird!" eventually resulted in a lyrically slurred, if short, rendition of "Sweet Home Alabama". An attendee of a Bob Dylan concert on June 9, 2016 in Berkeley, California, shouted during the last encore for "Free Bird" to be played, and Dylan and his band unexpectedly obliged, performing an instrumental snippet of the song as the closing track of the show.

On May 24, 2025, the Lynyrd Skynyrd YouTube channel released an official music video for "Free Bird".

=== United States national teams ===
Starting in 2026, Free Bird became a de facto celebration anthem of several United States national teams in international competitions; including being the U.S. goal celebration song at the 2026 Winter Olympics for the dual gold medal-winning men's and women's national ice hockey teams, the U.S. strikeout and home run anthem at the 2026 World Baseball Classic for the United States national baseball team, and as the U.S. goal celebration anthem at the 2026 FIFA World Cup for the United States men's national soccer team.

== Notable cover versions ==
- A medley by the dance-pop band Will to Power combined "Free Bird" with the Peter Frampton song "Baby, I Love Your Way" in 1988. Titled "Baby, I Love Your Way/Freebird Medley," the song spent one week at No. 1 on the Billboard Hot 100 chart.
- Dolly Parton covered "Free Bird", accompanied by Lynyrd Skynyrd and the Artimus Pyle Band, on her 49th and final studio album Rockstar. Ronnie Van Zant's vocals from the original sessions are featured on this recording.

== Personnel ==
Lynyrd Skynyrd

- Ronnie Van Zant – vocals
- Allen Collins – lead and acoustic guitars
- Gary Rossington – rhythm and slide guitars
- Ed King – bass
- Bob Burns – drums, percussion
- Billy Powell – piano
- "Roosevelt Gook" (producer Al Kooper) – organ, Mellotron

Personnel on 1976 live version

- Ronnie Van Zant – vocals
- Allen Collins – lead guitar
- Gary Rossington – rhythm and slide guitars
- Billy Powell – piano
- Leon Wilkeson – bass
- Steve Gaines – guitars
- Artimus Pyle – drums

== Chart and sales performance ==
The song has sold 2,111,000 downloads in the digital era, as of 2013.

=== Weekly charts ===
Studio version

Chart (1974–1975)	Peak position
Canada RPM Top Singles	58
US Billboard Hot 100	19
US Cashbox Top 100	25

Live version

Chart (1976–1977)	Peak position
Canada RPM Top Singles	47
US Billboard Hot 100	38
US Cash Box Top 100	32

Chart (1979–1980)	Peak position
UK Singles Chart	43

Chart (1982)	Peak position
Ireland (IRMA)	13
UK Singles Chart	21

Chart (2023–2026)	Peak position
US Hot Rock & Alternative Songs (Billboard)	15

=== Certifications ===
Region	Certification	Certified units/sales
Denmark (IFPI Danmark)	Gold	45,000^{‡}
Italy (FIMI)	Gold	50,000^{‡}
New Zealand (RMNZ)	4× Platinum	120,000^{‡}
Spain (Promusicae)	Gold	30,000^{‡}
United Kingdom (BPI)	2× Platinum	1,200,000^{‡}
^{‡} Sales+streaming figures based on certification alone.

== In popular culture ==
- In the 1994 film Forrest Gump, the song is featured in the scene when Jenny is out on the balcony, about to jump.
- In the 2014 film Kingsman: The Secret Service, the song's solo plays during a scene in which Harry Hart (Colin Firth) engages in a massive, extremely violent, church brawl. Director Matthew Vaughn revealed he picked "Free Bird" specifically because its guitar solo was long enough to encompass the whole scene.
- The song is used by USA Hockey programs, such as the men's and women's national teams, whenever they score goals and when they win.
- The song became the goal song for the United States men's national soccer team during the 2026 FIFA World Cup.
