= (Pronounced 'Lĕh-'nérd 'Skin-'nérd) =

Studio album by Lynyrd Skynyrd
- Released: August 13, 1973
- Recorded: March 27 – May 1, 1973
- Studios: Studio One, Doraville, Georgia, U.S.
- Genres: Southern rock; hard rock; blues rock
- Length: 43:03
- Label: MCA
- Producer: Al Kooper

Lynyrd Skynyrd chronology
| (Pronounced 'Lĕh-'nérd 'Skin-'nérd) (1973) | Second Helping (1974) |

Singles from (Pronounced 'Lĕh-'nérd 'Skin-'nérd)
- 1. "Gimme Three Steps" Released: November 5, 1973; 2. "Free Bird" Released: November 1974

(Pronounced 'Lĕh-'nérd 'Skin-'nérd) is the debut studio album by American rock band Lynyrd Skynyrd, released on August 13, 1973, by MCA Records. Recording took place in Doraville, Georgia at Studio One, following a lengthy period of rehearsals. Prior to the album's conception, many of its songs were already featured in Lynyrd Skynyrd's live repertoire. To promote it, the band released "Gimme Three Steps" and "Free Bird" as singles; these, along with "Simple Man" and "Tuesday's Gone", are among the band's best-known songs.

(Pronounced 'Lĕh-'nérd 'Skin-'nérd) received acclaim from music critics, and brought the band to the forefront of the Southern rock genre in the 1970s. The album peaked at 27 on the Billboard 200, and received gold and double platinum certifications from the Recording Industry Association of America (RIAA). It has appeared on several editions of Rolling Stone's list of the "500 Greatest Albums of All Time".

== Recording ==
Most of the songs on the album had been in the band's live repertoire for some time. The band found a rural rehearsal space near Jacksonville, Florida, which they nicknamed "Hell House" due to the long hours spent there jamming in the intense Florida heat, and it was there that they composed and ran through the songs endlessly until they were perfected. Producer Al Kooper marveled at how well prepared the band were once they entered the studio; every note was immutable and absolutely no improvisation was allowed.

Bassist Leon Wilkeson left the band a few months before the album's recording sessions. Ex-Strawberry Alarm Clock guitarist Ed King had been impressed with the band after an earlier incarnation of Lynyrd Skynyrd had opened for Strawberry Alarm Clock in Florida circa 1970. He told vocalist Ronnie Van Zant to keep him in mind if he ever needed a guitarist, and he was invited to replace Wilkeson as bassist. Once the recording sessions were wrapping up, Van Zant decided that King would better serve the band as a guitarist, and he visited Wilkeson and convinced him to rejoin. Wilkeson returned to the band and King moved to lead guitar, giving the band what would become their trademark "Three Guitar Army" along with Allen Collins and Gary Rossington. Wilkeson was back in the band by the time the band shot the cover photo for the album, and appears on the cover, as well as being acknowledged in the liner notes.

Atlanta Rhythm Section drummer and friend of the band Robert Nix was requested by Van Zant and Kooper to play on the track "Tuesday's Gone".

As the band worked up "Simple Man" in rehearsal, Kooper expressed his feeling that the song was weak and should not be included on the album. The band felt differently on both counts and could not change Kooper's mind. Ultimately, Van Zant escorted the producer outside to his car and ordered him to remain there until the song was recorded. The band recorded the song on their own with the producer absent from the studio, and it subsequently became one of Lynyrd Skynyrd's best known tracks.

== Artwork ==
The cover photograph was taken on Main Street in Jonesboro, Georgia, and shows, from left to right, Leon Wilkeson (seated), Billy Powell (seated), Ronnie Van Zant, Gary Rossington (seated), Bob Burns, Allen Collins and Ed King. The photo was the last in a long day of shooting for the album cover, and Rossington vomited on the sidewalk seconds after it was taken. As of March 2023, all the band members pictured are now deceased, with the passing of Rossington.

== Release ==
The album was released through MCA Records on August 13, 1973. It was re-released in 2001 as an expanded version with bonus tracks, including the two B-sides to the original singles and three previously unreleased demos from the album sessions. Sales through 2014 were an estimated two million units internationally.

== Reception ==
Professional ratings
Review scores
| Source | Rating |
|---|---|
| AllMusic | 5/5 stars |
| Christgau's Record Guide | A |
| MusicHound | 4/5 stars |
| Rolling Stone Album Guide | 4/5 stars |
| Encyclopedia of Popular Music | 4/5 stars |

(Pronounced 'Lĕh-'nérd 'Skin-'nérd) immediately put the band on the rock-and-roll map. Upon its release, rock journalist Robert Christgau acknowledged the quality of the songs and gave the album an "A" rating while referring to Lynyrd Skynyrd as a "staunchly untranscendent band". Kooper, a close friend of Pete Townshend, secured the band a spot opening for the Who on their American tour, and Lynyrd Skynyrd was subsequently exposed to much larger audiences than they had ever seen before.

Rolling Stone magazine ranked the album number 403 on its 2012 list of the 500 Greatest Albums of All Time, and number 381 in the 2020 edition.

== Track listing ==
Side one (A)
| No. | Title | Writer(s) | Length |
|---|---|---|---|
| 1. | "I Ain't the One" | Gary Rossington, Ronnie Van Zant | 3:51 |
| 2. | "Tuesday's Gone" | Allen Collins, Van Zant | 7:32 |
| 3. | "Gimme Three Steps" | Collins, Van Zant | 4:30 |
| 4. | "Simple Man" | Rossington, Van Zant | 5:57 |

Side two (B)
| No. | Title | Writer(s) | Length |
|---|---|---|---|
| 5. | "Things Goin' On" | Rossington, Van Zant | 4:57 |
| 6. | "Mississippi Kid" | Al Kooper, Van Zant, Bob Burns | 3:57 |
| 7. | "Poison Whiskey" | Ed King, Van Zant | 3:11 |
| 8. | "Free Bird" | Collins, Van Zant | 9:08 |
| Total length: | | | 43:03 |

- Sides one and two were combined as tracks 1–8 on CD reissues.

2001 CD reissue bonus tracks
| No. | Title | Writer(s) | Length |
|---|---|---|---|
| 9. | "Mr. Banker" (demo) | Rossington, Van Zant, King | 5:23 |
| 10. | "Down South Jukin'" (demo) | Rossington, Van Zant | 2:57 |
| 11. | "Tuesday's Gone" (demo) | Collins, Van Zant | 7:56 |
| 12. | "Gimme Three Steps" (demo) | Collins, Van Zant | 5:20 |
| 13. | "Free Bird" (demo) | Collins, Van Zant | 11:09 |
| Total length: | | | 75:48 |

== Personnel ==
Personnel according to liner notes.

Lynyrd Skynyrd

- Ronnie Van Zant – lead vocals
- Gary Rossington – lead guitar ("Tuesday's Gone", "Gimme Three Steps", "Things Goin' On", "Poison Whiskey"), rhythm guitar ("I Ain't the One", "Simple Man", "Mississippi Kid", "Free Bird")
- Allen Collins – lead guitar ("I Ain't the One", "Free Bird"), rhythm guitar ("Tuesday's Gone", "Gimme Three Steps", "Simple Man", "Things Goin' On", "Mississippi Kid", "Poison Whiskey")
- Ed King – bass (all except "Tuesday's Gone", "Mississippi Kid"), lead guitar ("Mississippi Kid")
- Billy Powell – keyboards
- Bob Burns – drums
- Leon Wilkeson – bass (credited but does not perform)

Additional personnel

- Al Kooper ("Roosevelt Gook") – bass, Mellotron, and harmony vocals ("Tuesday's Gone"); mandolin & bass drum ("Mississippi Kid"); organ ("Simple Man", "Poison Whiskey", "Free Bird")
- Robert Nix – drums ("Tuesday's Gone")
- Bobbye Hall – percussion ("Gimme Three Steps", "Things Goin')
- Steve Katz – harmonica ("Mississippi Kid")

Technical

- Al Kooper – producer, engineer
- Bob "Tub" Langford – engineer
- Rodney Mills – engineer
- Thomas Hill – photography
- Michael Diehl – design

== Charts ==
| Chart (1973) | Peak position |
|---|---|
| Canada Top Albums/CDs (RPM) | 93 |
| US Billboard 200 | 27 |

== Certifications ==
| Region | Certification | Certified units/sales |
|---|---|---|
| New Zealand (RMNZ) | Platinum | 15,000^{‡} |
| United Kingdom (BPI) | Silver | 60,000^{^} |
| United States (RIAA) | 2× Platinum | 2,000,000^{^} |
^{^} Shipments figures based on certification alone.^{‡} Sales+streaming figures based on certification alone.
