= Sweet Home Alabama =

1974 single by Lynyrd Skynyrd

- 1974 Spain single sleeve

Single by Lynyrd Skynyrd

from the album Second Helping
- B-side: "Take Your Time"
- Released: June 24, 1974
- Recorded: June 1973
- Genre: Southern rock; country rock; blues rock
- Length: 4:43
- Label: MCA
- Songwriters: Ed King; Gary Rossington; Ronnie Van Zant
- Producer: Al Kooper

Lynyrd Skynyrd singles chronology
"Don't Ask Me No Questions" (1974)	"Sweet Home Alabama" (1974)	"Free Bird" (1974)

Audio sample
- Sweet Home Alabama: file; help

Live video
- "Sweet Home Alabama" on YouTube

"Sweet Home Alabama" is a song by American rock band Lynyrd Skynyrd, released on the band's second album Second Helping (1974). It was written in response to Neil Young's songs "Southern Man" and "Alabama", which the band felt blamed the entire Southern United States for slavery; Young is name-checked and dissed in the lyrics. It reached number eight on the Billboard Hot 100 chart in 1974, becoming the band's highest-charting single.

The song remains a staple in Southern and classic rock, and, along with "Free Bird", is arguably the band's signature song.

== Background and recording ==
None of the three writers of the song were from Alabama; Ronnie Van Zant and Gary Rossington were both born in Jacksonville, Florida, while Ed King was from Glendale, California. In an interview with Garden & Gun, Rossington explained the writing process: "I had this little riff. It's the little picking part and I kept playing it over and over when we were waiting on everyone to arrive for rehearsal. Ronnie and I were sitting there, and he kept saying, 'play that again'. Then Ronnie wrote the lyrics and Ed and I wrote the music."

The introductive signature riff, prevalent throughout the song, was written and played by Ed King.

"Sweet Home Alabama" was written in answer to two songs by Neil Young, "Southern Man" and "Alabama", because the songs "took the entire South to task for the bloody history of slavery and its aftermath." "We thought Neil was shooting all the ducks in order to kill one or two," said Ronnie Van Zant at the time. The lyrics to "Sweet Home Alabama" include the following lines:

Well, I heard Mister Young sing about her
Well, I heard ol' Neil put her down
Well, I hope Neil Young will remember
A Southern man don't need him around anyhow

In Young's 2012 autobiography Waging Heavy Peace, he commented on his song: "My own song 'Alabama' richly deserved the shot Lynyrd Skynyrd gave me with their great record. I don't like my words when I listen to it. They are accusatory and condescending, not fully thought out, and too easy to misconstrue."

The basic track was recorded with guide lead vocals, Ed King's lead guitar, Leon Wilkeson's bass, and Bob Burns' drums. The final lead vocals from Van Zant, along with Rossington and Collins' rhythm guitars and Powell's piano were added later.

== Release ==
"Sweet Home Alabama" was a major chart hit for a band whose previous singles had "lazily sauntered out into release with no particular intent." The hit led to two television rock show offers that the band declined. In addition to the original appearance on Second Helping, the song has appeared on numerous Lynyrd Skynyrd compilations and live albums.

Record World called it the group's "most commercial single entry so far." The song was parodied and mocked by Warren Zevon in "Play It All Night Long," a song from his 1980 album Bad Luck Streak in Dancing School. It inspired the title and plot of the film Sweet Home Alabama. In September 2007, Alabama governor Bob Riley announced that the phrase "Sweet Home Alabama" would be used to promote Alabama state tourism in a multimillion-dollar ad campaign. In 2009, the state of Alabama began using the phrase as an official slogan on motor-vehicle license plates, and Riley noted that the song is the third most-played that refers to a specific destination.

Kid Rock's 2008 song "All Summer Long" interpolates "Sweet Home Alabama" on the chorus and uses the guitar solo and piano outro, as well as the "turn it up" shout before the guitar solo; Billy Powell is featured on the track. Since the release of "All Summer Long", the original song has also charted at number 44 on the UK Singles Chart. American heavy metal band Metallica also used the intro riff for their 1983 song "The Four Horsemen", which gained controversy as the riff was used without permission from the band.

The Leningrad Cowboys and the Alexandrov Ensemble did a humorous version of the song in the Total Balalaika Show.

=== Controversy ===
Part of "Sweet Home Alabama" was controversial in its reference to George Wallace, the governor of Alabama and supporter of racial segregation:

In Birmingham, they love the governor (boo boo boo)
Now we all did what we could do
Now Watergate does not bother me
Does your conscience bother you?
Tell the truth

The choice of Birmingham in connection with the governor (rather than the capital of Montgomery) is significant because it was the site of civil rights activism and violence in the 1960s, most notably Martin Luther King's Birmingham campaign. The lyrics then juxtapose the reference with the Watergate scandal, which was ongoing when the song was released. Music historians examining the juxtaposition of invoking Richard Nixon and Watergate after Wallace and Birmingham note that one reading of the lyrics is an "attack against the liberals who were so outraged at Nixon's conduct" while others interpret it regionally: "the band was speaking for the entire South, saying to northerners, we're not judging you as ordinary citizens for the failures of your leaders in Watergate; don't judge all of us as individuals for the racial problems of southern society."

In 1975, Van Zant said: "The lyrics about the governor of Alabama were misunderstood. The general public didn't notice the words 'Boo! Boo! Boo!' after that particular line, and the media picked up only on the reference to the people loving the governor." "The line 'We all did what we could do' is sort of ambiguous," Al Kooper notes, "'We tried to get Wallace out of there' is how I always thought of it." Journalist Al Swenson argues that the song is more complex than many believe and is not an endorsement of Wallace. Van Zant said: "Wallace and I have very little in common. I don't like what he says about colored people."

Ed King, the song's cowriter, contradicted his former bandmates in a 2009 post on his website. He claimed that the song was originally intended as the unabashed defense of Alabama, and even Wallace, that it appears to be:

I can understand where the 'boo boo boo' would be misunderstood. It's not US going 'boo' ... it's what the Southern man hears the Northern man say every time the Southern man'd say "In Birmingham we love the gov'nor". Get it? "We all did what WE could do!" to get Wallace elected. It's not a popular opinion but Wallace stood for the average white guy in the South.

"Watergate doesn't bother me" because that stuff happens in politics...but someone's conscience ought to bother them for what happened to Wallace. Walter Bremer [sic] may or may not have been a yankee but he sure destroyed whatever chance Wallace had to be president. And hardly anyone in America noticed. I still like the plaque that hangs here in my office that says I'm an honorary member of the Alabama State Militia...signed personally by George C. Sure, the man had his flaws. But he spoke for the common man of the South. And, whoa, I'm gonna get in trouble over this whole dang post!

Further complicating the racial politics of the song is the fact that Merry Clayton and Clydie King, two well-known black studio singers, are heard on the track as backing vocalists. In a 2013 interview, Clayton spoke at length about her decision to take the job. In her recollection, her initial response was negative: "[Clydie King] said the song was 'Sweet Home Alabama.' There was a silence on the phone for quite a while. I said, 'Clydie, are you serious? I'm not singing nothing about nobody's sweet home Alabama. Period.'" Nonetheless, Clayton was persuaded to take the job, to "let the music be [her] protest".

Skrewdriver, a neo-Nazi band who interpreted the song as being in support of segregation, covered it on their album After the Fire. In their version the lyrics are changed to include a line pledging allegiance to the Ku Klux Klan.

== Personnel ==
Partial credits (those noted with a reference) mostly via Richard Buskin and Rodney Mills.

=== Lynyrd Skynyrd ===
- Ronnie Van Zant – lead vocals
- Ed King – lead guitar, backing vocals (first "woo" at the end of the last chorus)
- Leon Wilkeson – bass guitar, backing vocals (second "woo" at the end of the last chorus)
- Bob Burns – drums
- Billy Powell – piano
- Allen Collins – rhythm guitar (left channel)
- Gary Rossington – rhythm guitar (right channel), acoustic guitar (left channel)

=== Additional personnel and production staff ===
- Al Kooper – backing vocals (left channel), producer, engineer
- Clydie King – background vocals
- Merry Clayton – background vocals
- Rodney Mills – engineer

Richard Buskin and Rodney Mills claim that the female backing vocals were performed by The Sweet Inspirations instead of Clydie King and Merry Clayton; Buskin also does not credit the acoustic guitarist but also recalls that the band did not like when their producer Al Kooper overdubbed himself onto their records, which means the acoustic guitar is likely played by Rossington, Collins, or King.

== Charts ==
=== Weekly charts ===
Chart (1974)	Peak position
Canada Top Singles (RPM)	6
US Billboard Hot 100	8
US Cash Box Top 100	7

Chart (1976)	Peak position
UK Singles (Official Charts)	31

Chart (2008)	Peak position
Austria (Ö3 Austria Top 40)	56
Germany (GfK)	87
Switzerland (Schweizer Hitparade)	51
UK Singles (Official Charts)	44

Chart (2021)	Peak position
US Hot Rock & Alternative Songs (Billboard)	13

Chart (2025–2026)	Peak position
Global 200 (Billboard)	118

=== Year-end chart ===
Chart (1974)	Rank
US Cashbox Top 100	58
Canadian RPM Top Singles	81

== Certifications and sales ==
Region	Certification	Certified units/sales
Brazil (Pro-Música Brasil)	Gold	30,000^{‡}
Denmark (IFPI Danmark)	2× Platinum	180,000^{‡}
Germany (BVMI)	Platinum	500,000^{‡}
Italy (FIMI)	Platinum	50,000^{‡}
New Zealand (RMNZ)	8× Platinum	240,000^{‡}
Spain (Promusicae)	Platinum	60,000^{‡}
United Kingdom (BPI)	3× Platinum	1,800,000^{‡}
United States (RIAA) Digital	Gold	3,680,000
United States (RIAA) Mastertone	Platinum	1,200,000
^{‡} Sales+streaming figures based on certification alone.

== Recognition and awards ==
- In May 2006, National Review ranked the song #4 on its list of the 50 greatest conservative rock songs.
- In July 2006, CMT ranked it as the #1 southern rock song.
- In 2009, the song was inducted into the Grammy Hall of Fame.

== See also ==
- Muscle Shoals, Alabama
- The Swampers
