= Ronnie Van Zant =

American singer (1948–1977)

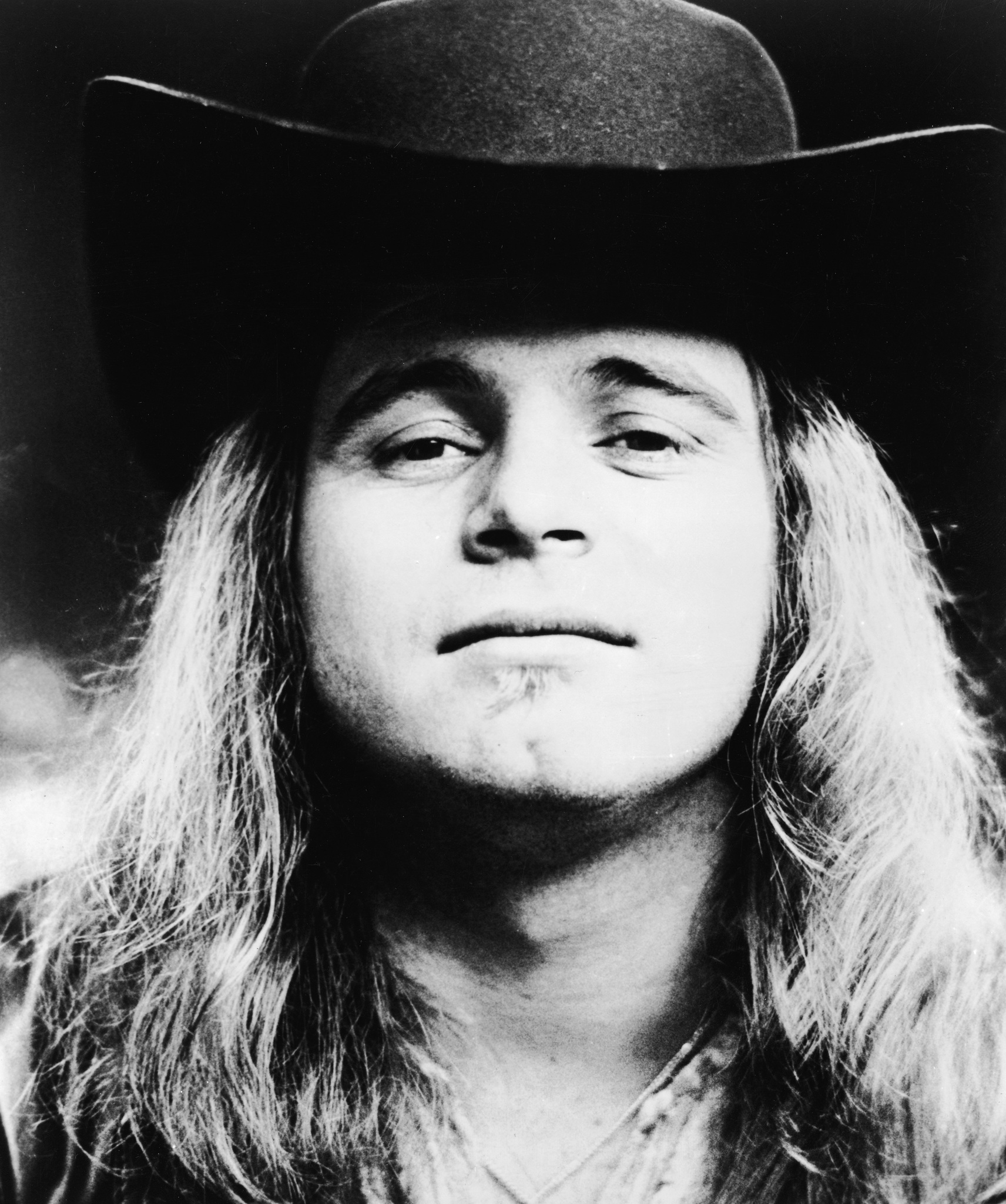
- Van Zant in 1976

Background information
- Born: Ronald Wayne Van Zant; January 15, 1948; Jacksonville, Florida, U.S.
- Died: October 20, 1977 (aged 29) Gillsburg, Mississippi, U.S.
- Cause of death: Aviation accident
- Genres: Southern rock; hard rock; blues rock
- Occupations: Singer; songwriter
- Years active: 1964–1977
- Formerly of: Lynyrd Skynyrd
- Spouses: Nadine Inscoe (m. 1967; div. 1969) Judy Seymour (m. 1972)

Ronald Wayne Van Zant (January 15, 1948 – October 20, 1977) was an American singer, best known as the founder, lead vocalist and primary lyricist of the southern rock band Lynyrd Skynyrd. He was the older brother of Johnny Van Zant, the current lead vocalist of Lynyrd Skynyrd, and Donnie Van Zant, the founder and vocalist of the rock band .38 Special.

== Early life ==
Ronnie Van Zant was born and raised in Jacksonville, Florida. His father was Lacy Austin Van Zant (1915–2004) and his mother Marion Virginia (née Hicks) Van Zant (1929–2000). He was of paternal Dutch heritage. A fan of boxer Muhammad Ali, Ronnie considered a career in boxing, and while playing American Legion baseball considered a career in professional baseball.

== Career ==
=== Lynyrd Skynyrd ===
Van Zant formed a band called My Backyard late in the summer of 1964 with friends and schoolmates Allen Collins (guitar), Gary Rossington (guitar), Larry Junstrom (bass), and Bob Burns (drums). The quintet went through several names before deciding on Lynyrd Skynyrd, as a mock tribute to their high school gym teacher Leonard Skinner at Robert E. Lee High School, which all band members had attended except Collins. Skinner's strict enforcement against long hair inspired the members to name their band after him.

The band's rise to prominence began in 1973 with the release of their debut album, (Pronounced 'Lĕh-'nérd 'Skin-'nérd), which had a string of hits that included "I Ain't the One", "Tuesday's Gone", "Gimme Three Steps", "Simple Man", and what became their signature song, "Free Bird", later dedicated to the late Duane Allman of The Allman Brothers Band.

The band also gained exposure when they were selected as the opening act for the US portion of The Who's Quadrophenia tour.

Lynyrd Skynyrd's biggest hit single was "Sweet Home Alabama" from their follow-up album Second Helping (1974), an answer to Neil Young's songs "Alabama" and "Southern Man". Young's song "Powderfinger" on the 1979 album Rust Never Sleeps was reportedly written for Skynyrd, and Van Zant is pictured on the cover of Street Survivors wearing a T-shirt of Young's Tonight's the Night and in the 2 July 1977 Oakland Coliseum concert (excerpted in Freebird... The Movie). According to legend, Van Zant was buried in his Tonight's the Night shirt.

== Death ==
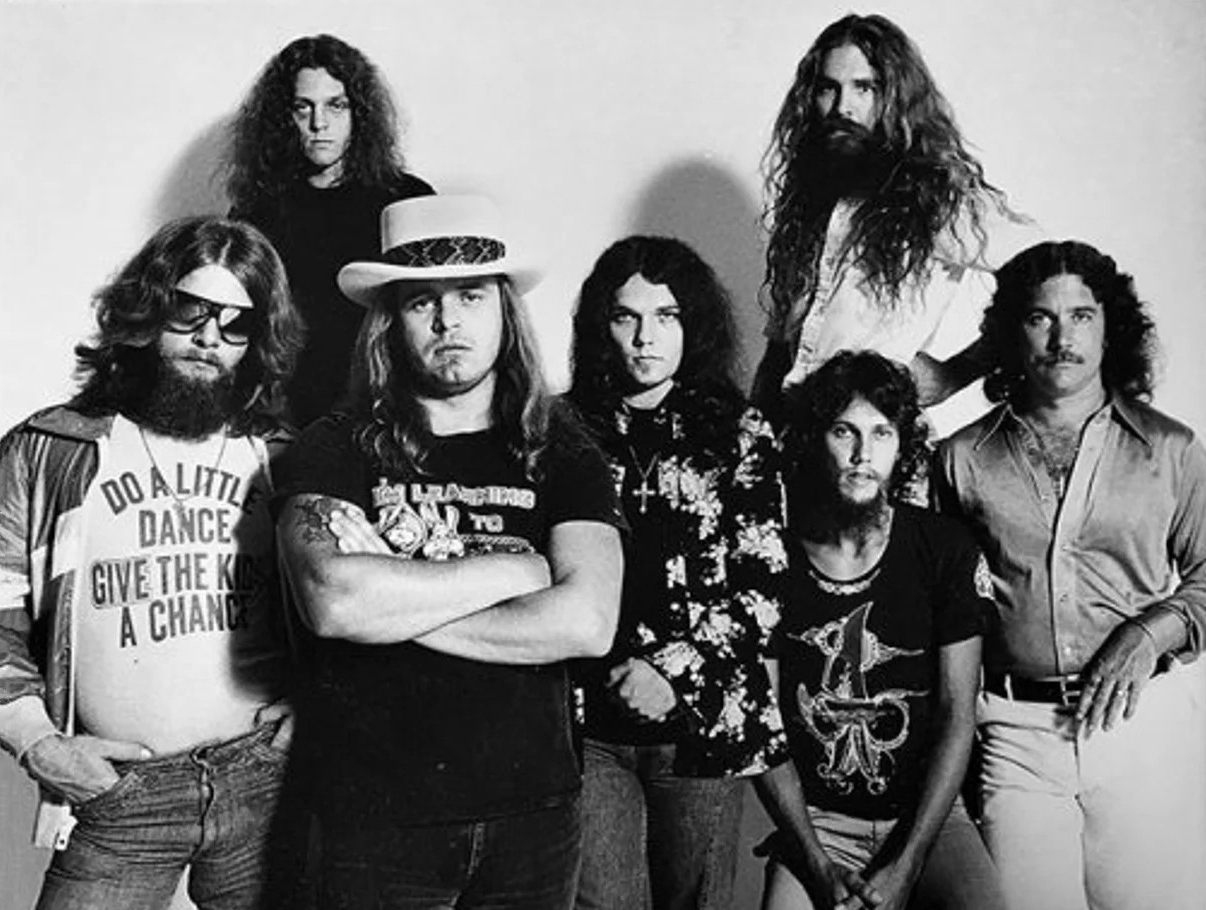
Lynyrd Skynyrd in 1977 (from left to right): Leon Wilkeson, Allen Collins, Ronnie Van Zant, Gary Rossington, Steve Gaines, Artimus Pyle and Billy Powell

On October 20, 1977, a plane carrying the band between shows from Greenville, South Carolina, to Baton Rouge, Louisiana, ran out of fuel outside Gillsburg, Mississippi. The passengers had been informed about potential problems with the Convair CV-240 and were told to brace for a crash. Van Zant died on impact from head injuries suffered after the aircraft struck a tree. Bandmates Steve Gaines and Cassie Gaines, along with assistant road manager Dean Kilpatrick, pilot Walter McCreary, and co-pilot William Gray, were also killed. The rest of the band were seriously injured. Van Zant was 29 years old.

According to former bandmate Artimus Pyle and family members, Van Zant had frequently discussed his mortality. Pyle recalls a moment when Lynyrd Skynyrd was in Japan: "Ronnie and I were in Tokyo, Japan, and Ronnie told me that he would never live to see thirty and that he would go out with his boots on, in other words, on the road. I said, 'Ronnie, don't talk like that,' but the man knew his destiny." Van Zant's father, Lacy, said, "He said to me many times, 'Daddy, I'll never be 30 years old.' I said, 'Why are you talking this junk? You will never be 30 years old?' and he said, 'Daddy, that's my limit.'" Van Zant's father later noted that, "God was a jealous god. Taking him for reasons I don't know." Ex-Lynyrd Skynyrd guitarist Ed King also reported hearing Van Zant saying he would never live to be 30, saying Van Zant said it so often that he "had gotten sick of hearing it". Lynyrd Skynyrd backup singer JoJo Billingsley recalled that Van Zant had begun referring to himself as "The Mississippi Kid" in the months before his death, despite having been born and raised in Florida. She noted that, eerily, Van Zant's only connection to Mississippi was that he would ultimately die there.

Ronnie's younger brother, Johnny, took over as the new lead singer when the band reunited in 1987, ten years after the plane crash.

Ed King recalled the intense sadness of Van Zant's funeral, noting that people in attendance were so overcome with grief that they were falling down. Van Zant was buried in Orange Park, Florida, in 1977. His body was relocated after vandals broke into his tomb and that of bandmate Steve Gaines on June 29, 2000. Van Zant's casket was pulled out and dropped on the ground. The bag containing Gaines' remains was torn open and some scattered onto the grass. Their mausoleums at Orange Park remain as memorials for fans to visit.

Around 2012, the new location of their interment was accidentally revealed by a Craigslist ad. A family selling two plots they decided not to retain, ran a Craigslist ad and stated the plots were in the Jacksonville Memory Gardens Cemetery in Orange Park, Florida, adjacent to Ronnie Van Zant's tomb.

In 2022, his widow announced that his body was moved to a new plot and that a new site was under construction.

== Personal life ==
Van Zant married Nadine Inscoe on January 2, 1967. Around this time, Van Zant also worked at his brother-in-law's auto parts store, Morris Auto Parts in Jacksonville. It was said that Van Zant was a virtual catalog of automotive parts, and had a near photographic memory for them. The couple had a daughter, Tammy, before divorcing in 1969. Tammy would become a musician before her death in 2022. Ronnie married Judy Seymour in 1972 after meeting her at The Comic Book Club through Gary Rossington in 1969. (The club closed in 1975 and is now a parking garage.) They had one daughter, Melody, born in 1976, and remained married until his death in 1977. Judy founded Freebird Live in 1999, a music venue located in Jacksonville Beach, Florida. It featured Lynyrd Skynyrd memorabilia and was co-owned by Melody Van Zant. Judy married Jim Jenness and founded and ran The Freebird Foundation until its dissolution in 2001.

Van Zant was an avid fisherman and enjoyed baseball; he was a fan of the Chicago White Sox and New York Yankees. In high school, he played American Legion baseball in the summer and aspired to play professionally, as he recalled in a 1975 interview.

Van Zant had several run-ins with the law, most notably in 1975, when he was arrested for hurling a table out of a second-story hotel room window.

== Legacy ==
The Ronnie Van Zant Memorial Park, funded by fans and family of the band, was built on Sandridge Road in Lake Asbury, Florida, nearby his hometown of Jacksonville.

Several members of his family have memorialized Ronnie in their music. His brothers Johnny and Donnie co-wrote the title track of John's 1990 album "Brickyard Road" with family friend and album producer Robert White Johnson. In the reformed Lynyrd Skynyrd's music video for the posthumously released track "What's Your Name" closes with a white hat similar to Ronnie's sitting atop a microphone. Ronnie's daughter Tammy, who was only 10 years old when he died, dedicated the album title track, "Freebird Child" as well as the music video to her father in 2009. Van Zant's cousin Jimmie Van Zant recorded the tribute track "Ronnie's Song" on the album Southern Comfort (2000).

Alt country band Drive-By Truckers also paid tribute to Ronnie and members of the original band on their Southern Rock Opera album.

"The All-Night Bus Ride", the 8th episode of season 1 of the Showtime series Roadies, was made in honor of Van Zant and the band.

In the 1978 song "Reflections" on the Charlie Daniels Band album Million Mile Reflections, the third verse refers to Van Zant, "... and Ronnie, my buddy above all the rest, I miss you the most and loved you the best." A dedication on the back of the original record sleeve includes a poem, the last line of which is "Fly on, proud bird, you're free at last. Signed, Charlie Daniels, 1978."

== Discography ==
- (Pronounced 'Lĕh-'nérd 'Skin-'nérd) (1973)
- Second Helping (1974)
- Nuthin' Fancy (1975)
- Gimme Back My Bullets (1976)
- One More from the Road (1976)
- Street Survivors (1977)

== See also ==
- Lynyrd Skynyrd: I'll Never Forget You – Book by Gene Odom

== Sources ==
- United States Social Security Death Index Master File, database (Alexandria, Virginia: National Technical Information Service, ongoing). (July 3, 2015). "Ronald Van Zant Social Security Death Index". FamilySearch.
- Anderson, R. Michael (June 30, 2000). "Van Zant's tomb defaced". The Florida Times-Union. Archived from the original on April 2, 2013.
- Check-Six (May 2007). "The 'Lynyrd Skynyrd' Crash".
- "SKYNYRD HISTORY LESSONS – Name Changes and Ten Dollar Gigs". Official Lynyrd Skynyrd History website.
- Social Security Death Master Index (May 2007). "Ronald Van Zant Social Security Death Index (#73220275)".
- US National Transportation Safety Board (June 19, 1978). "Aircraft Accident Report – L & J Company, Convair 240, N55VM, Gillsburg, Mississippi, October 20, 1977" (PDF). National Technical Information Service. pp. 27 pages.
