= Allen Collins =

American guitarist (1952–1990)

- Collins in 1975

Background information
- Born: Larkin Allen Collins Jr. July 19, 1952; Jacksonville, Florida, U.S.
- Died: January 23, 1990 (aged 37) Jacksonville, Florida, U.S.
- Genres: Southern rock; blues rock; country; country rock; hard rock
- Occupation: Guitarist
- Years active: 1964–1990
- Formerly of: Lynyrd Skynyrd; Rossington Collins Band; Allen Collins Band
- Spouse: Kathy Johns (m. 1970; died 1980)

Larkin Allen Collins Jr. (July 19, 1952 – January 23, 1990) was an American guitarist, and one of the founding members of the Southern rock band Lynyrd Skynyrd. He co-wrote many of the band's songs with frontman and original lead singer Ronnie Van Zant.

== Biography ==
=== Early life ===
Collins was born in Jacksonville, Florida in 1952. He started playing guitar at 12 years of age, with a few lessons from his stepmother, Leila Collins, a country-and-western guitarist, and received his first guitar and amplifier from his mother. Inspired by the Beatles on The Ed Sullivan Show in 1964, he formed his first group, the Mods, with friends Larry Steele (bass), Donnie Ulsh (guitar), and James Rice (drums). Collins attended Nathan B. Forrest High School.

In 1970, Collins married Kathy Johns. All of his bandmates were in his wedding party, but Kathy worried that the band's long haired appearance would disturb her parents. To solve this problem, she required all the band members to keep their hair under wigs at the wedding ceremony. The wedding reception was one of the first public performances of "Free Bird" complete with the trademark extended guitar jam at the end. Collins's family grew with the birth of his daughter Amie, followed quickly by Allison. Collins was fond of cars, and had an extensive car collection, one of his favorites being a 1932 Plymouth coupe nicknamed "Dixie Blue".

=== Career with Lynyrd Skynyrd ===
Collins joined Skynyrd in Jacksonville, Florida, just two weeks after its formation by Ronnie Van Zant and Gary Rossington, along with Bob Burns and Larry Junstrom. Knowing that Collins played guitar and owned his own equipment, the band decided to approach him about joining them. Van Zant and Burns both had a reputation for trouble, and Collins fled on his bicycle and hid up a tree when he saw them pull up in his driveway. They soon convinced him that they were not there to beat him up and he agreed to join the band, then known as "The One Percent".

Collins and lead singer Ronnie Van Zant co-wrote many of the biggest Skynyrd hits, including "Free Bird", "Gimme Three Steps", and "That Smell". The band received national success beginning in 1973 while opening for the Who on their Quadrophenia tour. Collins played all of the leads on the iconic Freebird outro himself, doubling everything in the studio. Co-guitarist Gary Rossington said of the track, and Collins' part, "The whole long jam was Allen Collins himself. He was bad. He was super bad! He was bad-to-the-bone bad. When we put the solo together, we liked the sound of the two guitars, and I could’ve gone out and played it with him. But the way he was doin’ it, he was just so hot! He just did it once and did it again and it was done."

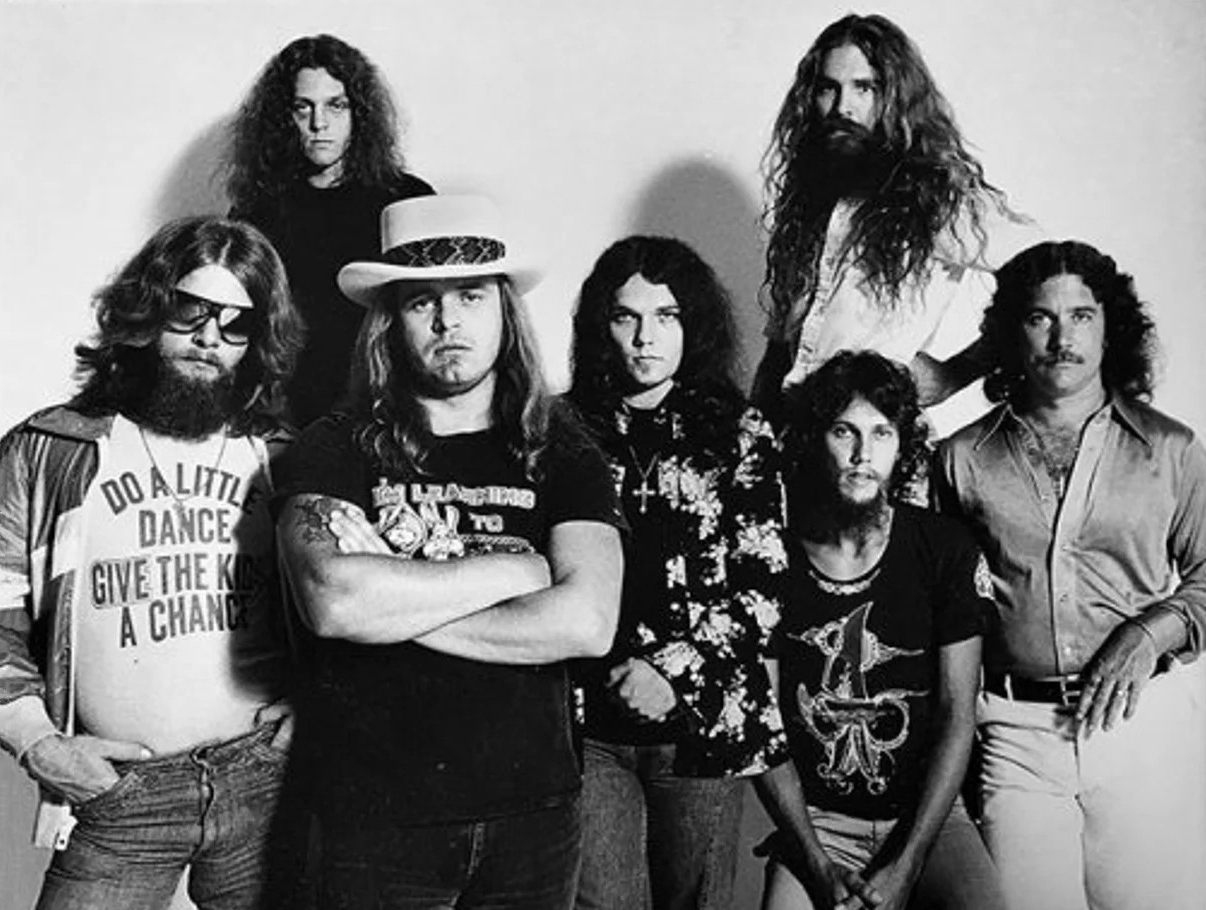
Collins with Lynyrd Skynyrd in 1977 (from left to right): Leon Wilkeson, Allen Collins, Ronnie Van Zant, Gary Rossington, Steve Gaines, Artimus Pyle and Billy Powell

On October 20, 1977, an airplane carrying the band crashed into a forest in Mississippi, killing three band members, including Van Zant. Collins was seriously injured in the crash, suffering two broken vertebrae in his neck and severe damage to his left arm. Amputation was recommended but Collins's father refused, and he eventually recovered.

=== Later life and death ===
During the early 1980s, Collins continued to perform onstage in the Rossington Collins Band, which enjoyed modest success, releasing two albums (Anytime, Anyplace, Anywhere and This Is the Way), and charting a few singles (notably "Don't Misunderstand Me").

In 1980, during the first days of the band's debut concert tour, his wife Kathy died suddenly of a hemorrhage during the miscarriage of their third child. This forced the tour's cancellation. The Rossington Collins Band disbanded in 1982. Collins continued to pursue music, starting the Allen Collins Band, which released one album, Here, There & Back in 1983. The six members included two Skynyrd bandmates – keyboardist Billy Powell and bassist Leon Wilkeson – along with lead singer Jimmy Dougherty, drummer Derek Hess, and guitarists Barry Lee Harwood and Randall Hall. In 1984, Collins tried to resurrect the band, hiring Jacksonville guitarist Mike Owings and bassist Andy Ward King. Later members included guitarist-vocalist Michael Ray FitzGerald and bassist "Filthy Phil" Price.

On January 29, 1986, Collins was driving a new black Ford Thunderbird in Jacksonville on Plummer Grant Road when he lost control of the car just south of Old St. Augustine Road and crashed. The crash claimed the life of his girlfriend, Debra Jean Watts, and paralyzed the guitarist from the waist down, with limited use of his arms and hands. Collins pleaded no contest to vehicular manslaughter as well as driving under the influence of alcohol. Due to his injuries, he would never play guitar on stage again.

Collins's last performance with Lynyrd Skynyrd was at the band's first reunion after the plane crash at the 1979 Volunteer Jam V in Nashville, Tennessee. All remaining members of Lynyrd Skynyrd reunited officially in 1987, but Collins served only as musical director, due to his paralysis. As part of his plea bargain for the 1986 accident, Collins addressed fans at every Skynyrd concert with an explanation of why he could not perform, citing the dangers of drinking and driving, as well as drugs and alcohol. Because of Collins's crash, the band donated a sizable amount of concert proceeds from the 1987–88 tour to the Miami Project, which is involved in treatment of paralysis. Collins founded Roll For Rock Wheelchair Events and Benefit Concerts in 1988 to raise awareness and to provide opportunities for those living with spinal cord injuries and other physical disabilities.

Collins died on January 23, 1990, from chronic pneumonia, a complication of the paralysis. He is buried beside his wife in Jacksonville, Florida.

== Instruments ==
In the early days of Lynyrd Skynyrd, Collins used a black Gibson Flying V. This guitar was stolen, along with Gary Rossington's white Gibson SG, when the band's van was broken into after a gig. For most of his tenure in Skynyrd, Collins used a Gibson Firebird fitted with a chrome-covered, "dog-eared" P-90 pickup in the bridge position and a Gibson "teaspoon" nickel vibrato arm. In 1976 he switched to a natural-finished korina 1958 Gibson Explorer that he had bought for about $3,000, and used that guitar throughout his tenure with the Allen Collins Band.

In late 1977 Collins began occasionally playing a Gibson Les Paul Special, with a double cutaway, P-90s, a sunburst finish, and modded with a Lyre Tremolo. He continued to use this guitar in the Rossington Collins Band as well. On "Gimme Back My Bullets", "Sweet Home Alabama", and "Every Mother's Son" Collins used a Sunburst Fender Stratocaster after Ed King had left. Collins was also filmed playing an all-black Stratocaster with a rosewood fingerboard, white pickups and white control knobs.

== Discography ==
With Lynyrd Skynyrd

- (Pronounced 'Lĕh-'nérd 'Skin-'nérd) (1973)
- Second Helping (1974)
- Nuthin' Fancy (1975)
- Gimme Back My Bullets (1976)
- One More from the Road (1976)
- Street Survivors (1977)

With Rossington Collins Band

- Anytime, Anyplace, Anywhere (1980)
- This Is the Way (1981)

With Allen Collins Band

- Here, There & Back (1983)
