= Bob Burns (drummer) =

American drummer (1950–2015)

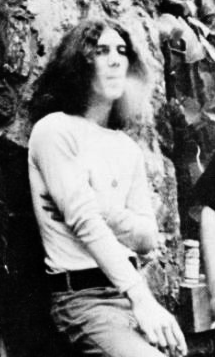
- Burns in 1973

Background information
- Born: Robert Lewis Burns Jr. November 24, 1950; Gainesville, Florida, U.S.
- Died: April 3, 2015 (aged 64) Cartersville, Georgia, U.S.
- Genre: Southern rock
- Occupation: Drummer
- Years active: 1964–2015
- Formerly of: Lynyrd Skynyrd

Robert Lewis Burns Jr. (November 24, 1950 – April 3, 2015) was the founding member and principal drummer of the original lineup for the southern rock band Lynyrd Skynyrd.

== Biography ==
Burns was born in Gainesville, Florida, on November 24, 1950. He, along with Gary Rossington and Larry Junstrom formed the first band that would be later called Lynyrd Skynyrd in 1964. Later on, Burns hired Ronnie Van Zant as lead singer after Van Zant showed up on his front porch informing Burns his band "US" had broken up and he knew Burn's band needed a singer. Later on, after a few band practices, Burns realized the band needed more guitar players and sought out Allen Collins, whom he knew was an excellent guitarist with good gear in the local band called "The Mods". The story of acquiring Allen Collins is legendary because after Collins saw Ronnie Van Zant he took off on his bicycling trying to flee the notorious Van Zant who had the reputation of being a street fighter. After talking Collins from a tree he had climbed and assuring him they were not going to beat him up, he agreed to join them. It was after this that Collins informed Van Zant that he had been warned, that if he tried to quit the mods, they would "Creep him" Van Zant said no problem and Burns, Collins and Van Zant went to The Mods rehearsal house where Van Zant emerged from his Ford Mustang, hollered "Hey!" ripped off his T-shirt like the old school wrestlers and exclaimed he was there to get Allen's gear and wanted to know if anyone had a problem with it?! To which they said no problem, we will help you load it. The rest is history, Bob Burns remained until 1975, although by some accounts he left the band for a while during the early 1970s. Burns played on the band's early recordings, but on the album Skynyrd's First and... Last, a collection of early demos made in Muscle Shoals, the drum parts of some songs recorded in 1971 were played by Rickey Medlocke. That album also contains songs recorded in 1972 which feature Burns on drums, suggesting that Burns left the band in 1971 and had returned by 1972. During a brief period in the early 1970s, Medlocke occasionally played alongside Burns on drums for live shows, a two-drummer lineup similar to the Allman Brothers Band and The Grateful Dead.

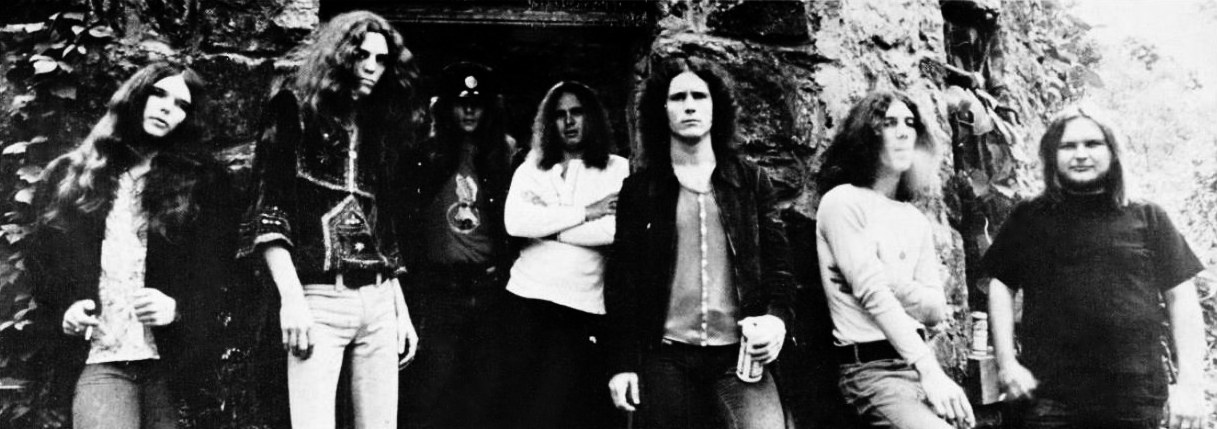
Burns with Lynyrd Skynyrd in 1973. Left to right: Gary Rossington, Allen Collins, Leon Wilkeson, Ronnie Van Zant, Billy Powell, Burns, Ed King

In addition to Skynyrd's First and... Last, Burns played on the band's first two official albums: (Pronounced 'Lĕh-'nérd 'Skin-'nérd) and Second Helping.

After growing weary of touring Burns left Lynyrd Skynyrd in 1975.

In 1996, after years of public disappearance, he participated in a performance to promote Freebird: The Movie.

On March 13, 2006, he rejoined Lynyrd Skynyrd for one performance, playing alongside Gary Rossington, Billy Powell, Ed King, Artimus Pyle and The Honkettes at the Rock and Roll Hall of Fame induction.

Burns died on April 3, 2015, in a single-car crash after hitting a mailbox and tree on a sharp curve in Cartersville, Georgia, shortly after leaving his home.
