= Ed King =

American rock musician (1949–2018)

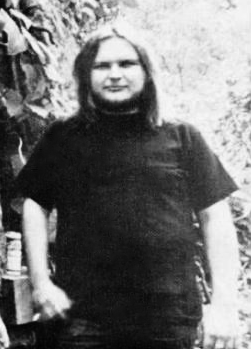
- King in 1973

Background information
- Born: Edward Calhoun King; September 14, 1949; Glendale, California, U.S.
- Died: August 22, 2018 (aged 68) Nashville, Tennessee, U.S.
- Genres: Southern rock, psychedelic rock
- Occupation: Musician
- Instruments: Guitar, bass
- Years active: 1965–2018
- Formerly of: Lynyrd Skynyrd, Strawberry Alarm Clock

Edward Calhoun King (September 14, 1949 – August 22, 2018) was an American musician. He was a guitarist for the psychedelic rock band Strawberry Alarm Clock and guitarist and bassist for the Southern rock band Lynyrd Skynyrd from 1972 to 1975, and again from 1987 to 1996.

== Strawberry Alarm Clock ==
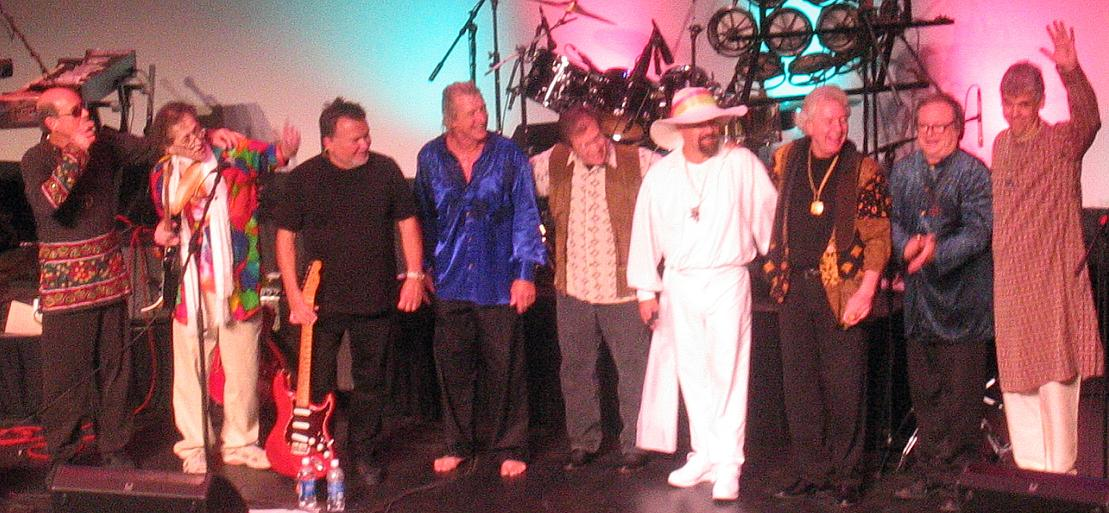
King (third from left) with a reunited Strawberry Alarm Clock in 2007

King was born in the Los Angeles suburb of Glendale, California. He was one of the founding members of the LA-based Strawberry Alarm Clock, a mid-1960s pop psychedelic rock band. The band's largest success was with the 1967 single "Incense and Peppermints", which reached No. 1 on the Billboard Hot 100. While with the band he played both electric guitar and bass guitar. The band's popularity waned considerably in the early 1970s. Faced with the loss of their recording contract with Uni Records and with internal conflicts over musical direction, Strawberry Alarm Clock disbanded in early 1972. King opted to relocate to the Southern United States to join Lynyrd Skynyrd (an earlier version of which had opened for Strawberry Alarm Clock four years earlier).

== Lynyrd Skynyrd ==
King met the members of what was to become the Jacksonville, Florida-based Southern rock band Lynyrd Skynyrd when an earlier incarnation of the band known as The One Percent opened for Strawberry Alarm Clock in early 1968. King was so enamored with the band that he told vocalist and leader Ronnie Van Zant that if they ever needed his services, he would be happy to join. It was not until 1972 when bassist Leon Wilkeson left the band that Van Zant took King up on his offer and asked him to join Skynyrd as the band's new bassist. Wilkeson soon regretted leaving and rejoined the band, and King switched to lead guitar, creating with Allen Collins and Gary Rossington the triple-guitar attack that became the band's signature sound. The band referred to this unique new setup with King as the "Three Guitar Army".

King's guitar playing and songwriting skills were an essential element of Lynyrd Skynyrd's first three albums: (Pronounced 'Lĕh-'nérd 'Skin-'nérd), Second Helping and Nuthin' Fancy. King co-wrote one of the band's most recognizable hits "Sweet Home Alabama", and his voice counted the "one, two, three", before he launched into his famous riff to start the song. Other songs that King wrote or co-wrote for Lynyrd Skynyrd include "Poison Whiskey", "Saturday Night Special", "Whiskey Rock-a-Roller" and "Workin' for MCA". Guitarist Rossington noted years later that King was the most business-minded member of Lynyrd Skynyrd, relating a story of how King would stock up on food items during stops on tour and then re-sell the items to his bandmates at a 500% markup when they later got hungry on the bus.

Band biographer Mark Ribowsky wrote that King was an outsider in Lynyrd Skynyrd to some extent, as he was from Southern California and the only non-Southerner in the lineup, but that it was King who brought a level of professionalism to the fledgling band. King detailed his initial exit from the band in the documentary If I Leave Here Tomorrow: A Film About Lynyrd Skynyrd, saying "Ronnie [Van Zant] and my guitar roadie who changed my strings were thrown in jail in Ann Arbor. They didn't arrive...until 10 minutes before we went on. I had to play on old strings and I broke two strings during "Free Bird". After, Ronnie was riding me, and a lightbulb went off and I said, "That's it." I went back to my room, packed up my stuff and left." King referred to himself as a peaceful "Southern California hippie" and the band's predilection for drunken brawling never sat well with him; the incident which led to his departure was merely the final straw.

King's departure in 1975 happened during a particularly difficult tour that the band dubbed the "Torture Tour", a tour that also claimed drummer and founding member Bob Burns weeks earlier due to a mental breakdown. The band continued with only two guitarists for a few months before discovering Steve Gaines in 1976. Gaines was killed in a plane crash along with his sister Cassie Gaines and Van Zant on October 20, 1977. Coincidentally, Steve Gaines was born on the same day as King, September 14, 1949.

King was one of the guitarists in the reunited Lynyrd Skynyrd in 1987, and played a major role. He had to leave the band again in 1996 because of congestive heart failure. In 2005, Ed asked Mark Basile, a long time friend, band member and guitarist from New York, to put together the remaining non-touring Skynyrd members, Artimus Pyle, Leslie Hawkins, JoJo Billingsley and Bob Burns for several shows from 2005-2006. That band, called The Saturday Night Special Band, played several shows that can be found on YouTube. Basile also played shows with Dickey Betts and The Atlanta Rhythm Section.

King, along with all pre-crash members of Lynyrd Skynyrd, were inducted into the Rock and Roll Hall of Fame in 2006. His guitar playing influenced many subsequent musicians, including Metallica bassist Cliff Burton.

== Personal life ==
In 2011, King underwent a successful heart transplant. In 2017, he appeared as a customer in the Discovery Channel docudrama Moonshiners, buying $30,000 worth of premium gin.

King had been battling cancer in the months prior to his death. He died in his Nashville, Tennessee, home on August 22, 2018, at 68 years of age. His death was announced through his personal Facebook page. Following King's death, former Lynyrd Skynyrd bandmate Rossington released a statement saying, "Ed was our brother, and a great songwriter and guitar player. I know he will be reunited with the rest of the boys in Rock and Roll Heaven. Our thoughts and prayers are with his family."
