= Billy Powell =

American keyboardist (1952–2009)

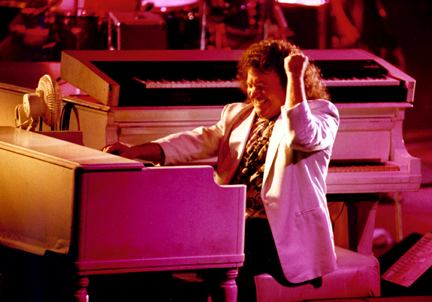
- Powell in 2007

Background information
- Born: William Norris Powell; June 3, 1952; Corpus Christi, Texas, U.S.
- Died: January 28, 2009 (aged 56) Orange Park, Florida, U.S.
- Genres: Southern rock; blues rock; country rock; hard rock
- Occupation: Musician
- Instrument: Keyboards
- Years active: 1964–2009
- Formerly of: Lynyrd Skynyrd

William Norris Powell (June 3, 1952 – January 28, 2009) was an American musician and the keyboardist of southern rock band Lynyrd Skynyrd from 1972 until his death in 2009.

== Biography ==
=== Early life ===
Powell was born in Corpus Christi, Texas. He grew up in a military family and spent several of his childhood years in Italy, where his father was stationed with the U.S. Navy. After his father died of cancer in 1960, the Powells returned to the United States to settle in Jacksonville, Florida. In elementary school, Powell met Leon Wilkeson, who became a lifelong friend and the bassist for Lynyrd Skynyrd. Powell took an interest in piano and he began taking piano lessons from local teacher Madalyn Brown, who claimed that Billy did not need a teacher as he was a natural and picked things up well on his own. When it was time for high school, his mother enrolled Billy and his brother Ricky at Sanford Naval Academy in Sanford, Florida. Powell returned to Jacksonville, where he enrolled at Bishop Kenny High School. After graduation in 1970, he enrolled at and briefly attended a community college, majoring in music theory.

=== Lynyrd Skynyrd ===
Around 1970, Powell found work as a roadie for Lynyrd Skynyrd and remained a member of the crew for two years, during which the band secured a support role for the band Mountain. In 1972, Skynyrd played a show at the Bolles School prom. During a break at that event, Powell sat down at a piano and played a song. When the band realized their roadie's ability, he was offered the position of keyboardist. In the 2018 documentary "If I Leave Here Tomorrow", Powell stated that he was inspired by the Beatles to change his ability from technical to emotional boogie-woogie.

In 1973, Lynyrd Skynyrd was signed to MCA Records and received national exposure following the release of their first album, (pronounced 'lĕh-'nérd 'skin-'nérd). The band's popularity soared in 1974 with their follow-up album, Second Helping, which featured their highest-charting single, "Sweet Home Alabama". Powell played a prominent piano solo toward the end of the song. The band enjoyed increasing popularity over the next three years, culminating in the 1977 release of Street Survivors.

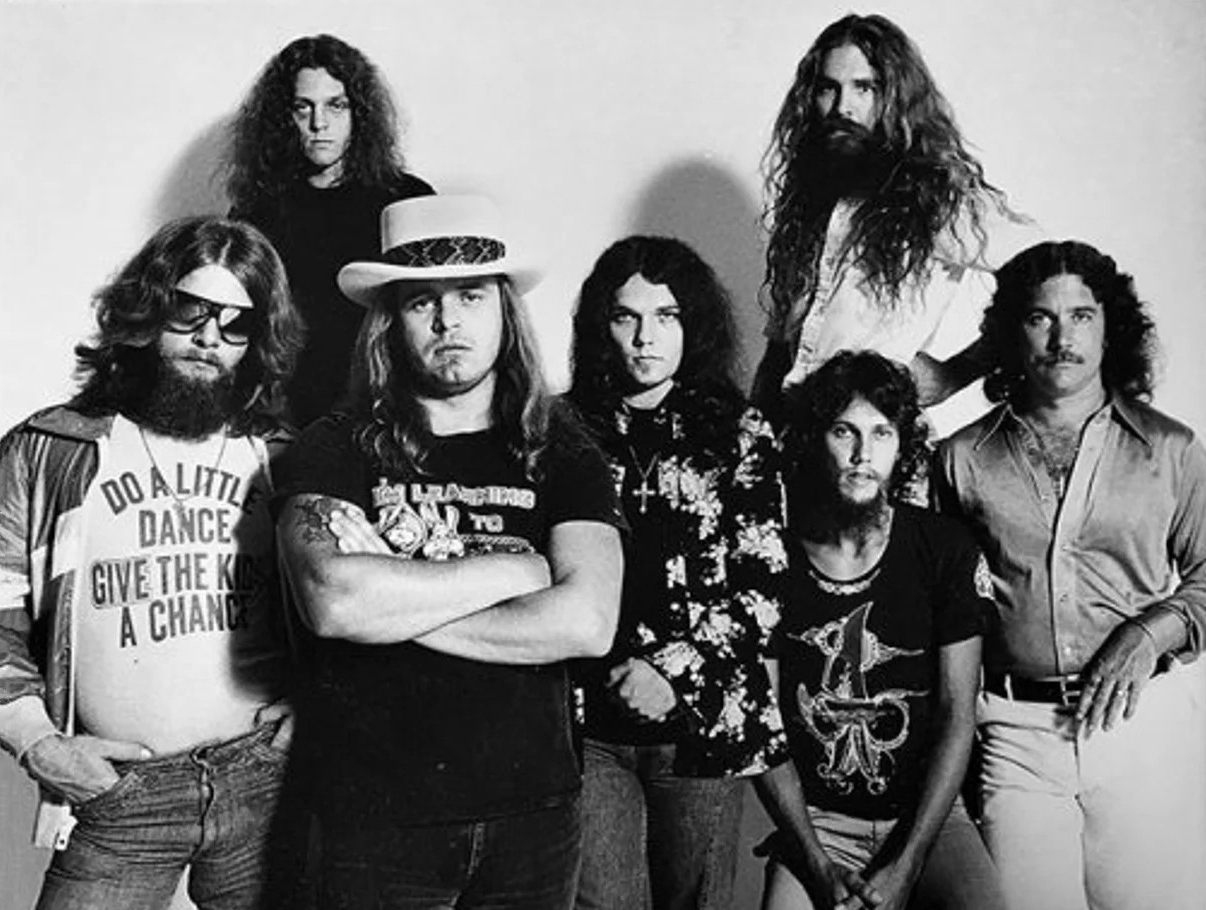
Lynyrd Skynyrd in 1977 (from left to right): Leon Wilkeson, Allen Collins, Ronnie Van Zant, Gary Rossington, Steve Gaines, Artimus Pyle and Billy Powell

Three days after the release of Street Survivors, Skynyrd's chartered Convair CV-240 crashed into a forest near McComb, Mississippi. The crash took the lives of singer Ronnie Van Zant, guitarist Steve Gaines, his sister and backing vocalist Cassie Gaines, assistant road manager Dean Kilpatrick, and both pilots. The remainder of the band suffered mild to severe injuries. Powell suffered severe facial lacerations, almost losing his nose, but was otherwise relatively uninjured. He was the first to be released from the hospital, and the only member able to attend the funerals of his bandmates.

During the time between the plane crash and the Lynyrd Skynyrd reunion in 1987, Powell joined the Christian rock band Vision in 1984. With Vision he recorded three albums (Mountain in The Sky, Vision, and Streetfighter), and toured extensively. His keyboard performances were spotlighted in Vision concerts. During the concerts, Powell spoke about his newfound Christianity; messages that were also delivered via two bonus tracks included on the album Mountain in the Sky. Powell also worked with 38 Special during this time.

Powell rejoined Lynyrd Skynyrd in 1987 for a tribute tour, and remained with the band until his death. At the time of his death, he and guitarist Gary Rossington were the only members from the classic lineup who were active in the band.

=== Death ===
On January 28, 2009, Powell died at the age of 56 at his home in Orange Park, Florida. It was during a break from Skynyrd's touring schedule that Powell suffered a fatal heart attack. The music he had recorded with Vision was played at a private memorial service, and Kid Rock sang a tribute. Southern Rock musicians in attendance included his Skynyrd and Vision bandmates, their families and Hank Williams Jr..

The song "Gifted Hands" was later written and recorded by Lynyrd Skynyrd as a tribute to Powell.
