= Gary Rossington =

American guitarist (1951–2023)

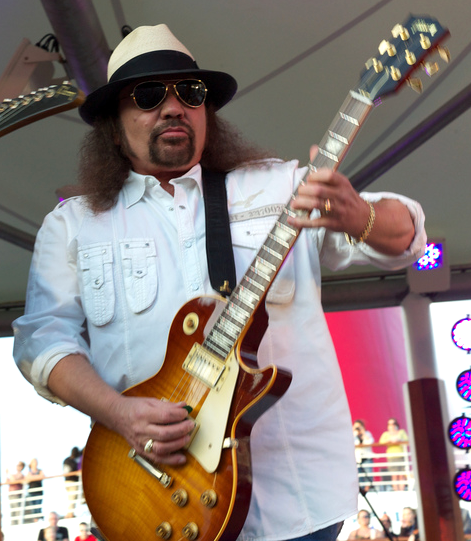
- Rossington in 2011

Background information
- Born: Gary Robert Rossington; December 4, 1951; Jacksonville, Florida, U.S.
- Died: March 5, 2023 (aged 71) Milton, Georgia, U.S.
- Genres: Southern rock; blues rock; boogie rock; hard rock
- Occupations: Musician; songwriter
- Instrument: Guitar
- Years active: 1964–2023
- Formerly of: Lynyrd Skynyrd; The Rossington Band; Rossington Collins Band
- Spouse: Dale Krantz (m. 1982)

Gary Robert Rossington (December 4, 1951 – March 5, 2023) was an American musician best known as a founding guitarist of Southern rock band Lynyrd Skynyrd, with whom he performed until his death. Rossington was also a founding member of the Rossington Collins Band, along with former bandmate Allen Collins. Rossington was both the longest-serving and last surviving original member of Lynyrd Skynyrd by the time of his death.

== Early life ==
Rossington was born in Jacksonville, Florida, on December 4, 1951. His mother recalled that he had a strong childhood interest in baseball and aspired as a child to one day play for the New York Yankees. Rossington recalled that he was a "good ball player" but upon hearing the Rolling Stones in his early teens he became interested in music and ultimately gave up on his baseball aspirations.

It was Rossington's love of baseball that indirectly led to the formation of Lynyrd Skynyrd in the summer of 1964. He became acquainted with Ronnie Van Zant and Bob Burns while playing on rival Jacksonville baseball teams and the trio decided to jam together one afternoon after Burns was injured by a ball hit by Van Zant. They set up their equipment in the carport of Burns' parents' house and played The Rolling Stones' then-current hit "Time Is on My Side". Liking what they heard, they immediately decided to form a band. Naming themselves The Noble Five, with the additions of guitarist Allen Collins and bassist Larry Junstrom, they later changed the name of the band to The One Percent before eventually settling on the name Lynyrd Skynyrd in 1969.

Rossington grew up in a single-parent household and said that early in their relationship, Van Zant became something of a father figure to him. He credited Van Zant, who was three years his senior, with teaching him and his bandmates how to drive a car, as well as introducing them to "all that stuff you learn when you're 14, 15, 16".

According to a New York Times article, Lacy Van Zant, patriarch of the Van Zant family, once went to West Jacksonville's Robert E. Lee High School to plead Rossington's case to school administrators after the fatherless Rossington was suspended for having long hair. Lacy Van Zant explained to the assistant principal that Rossington's father, who died shortly after Rossington was born, had died in the Army and that Rossington's mother needed the money Rossington made playing in his band. Lacy Van Zant further explained that, like his own sons, they were working men and long hair was part of the job. It is not known if the elder Van Zant's efforts were successful, but Rossington later dropped out of high school to focus on Lynyrd Skynyrd full-time.

== Career ==
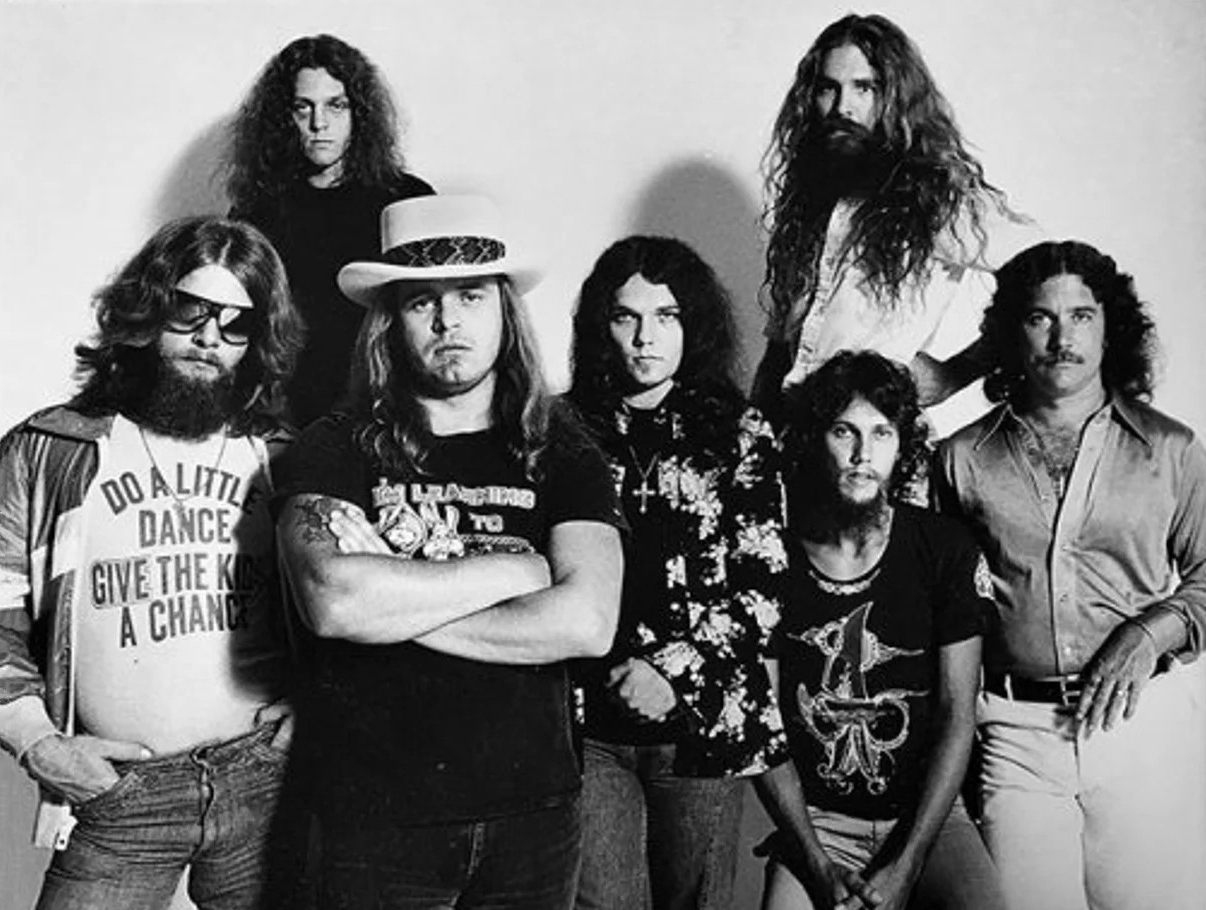
Rossington (center) with Lynyrd Skynyrd in 1977

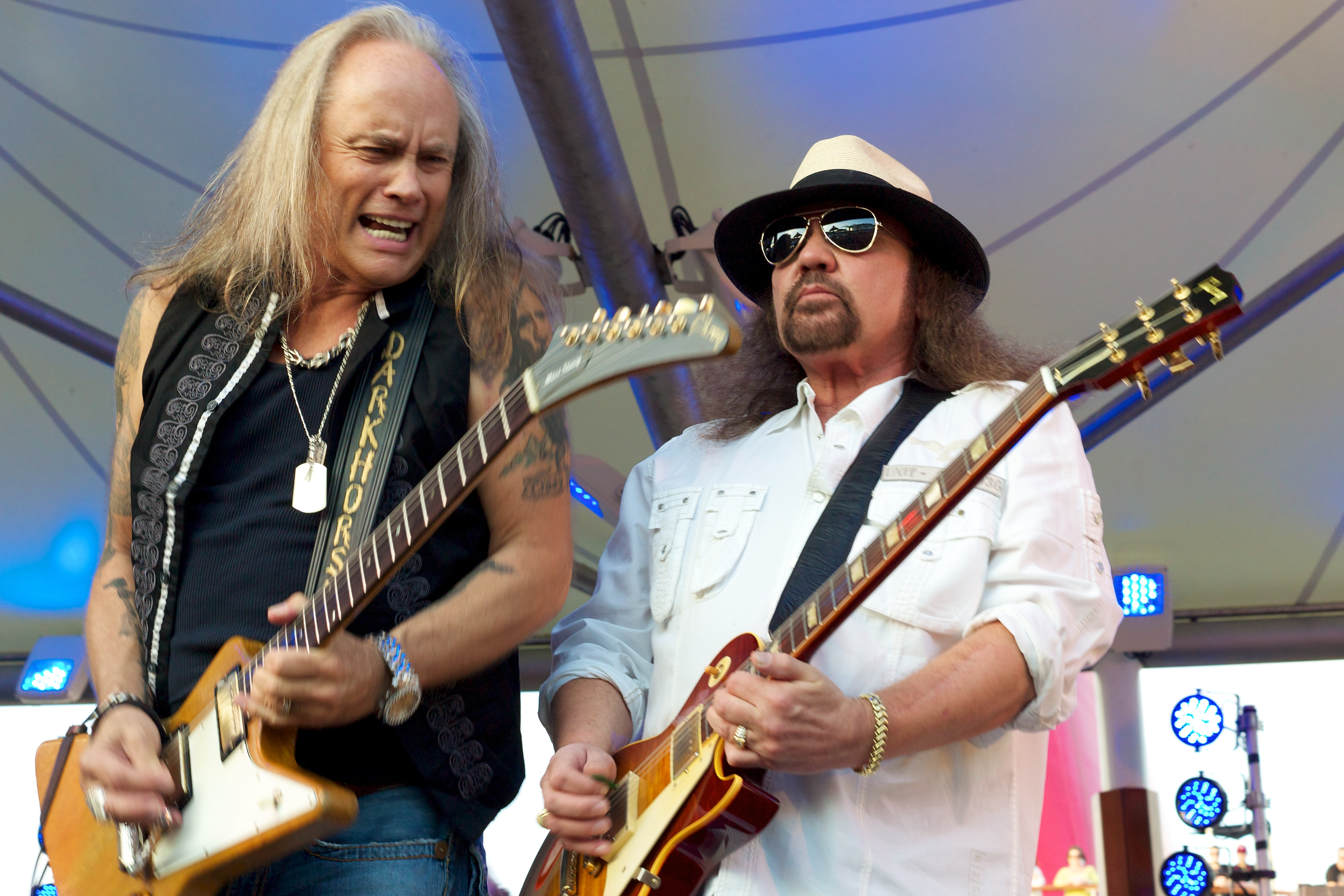
Rossington (right) performing alongside Rickey Medlocke in 2011

In 1976, Rossington and fellow Skynyrd guitarist Allen Collins were both involved in separate car accidents in their hometown of Jacksonville. While Collins’ accident that year was uneventful, Rossington had just bought a new Ford Torino and hit an oak tree while under the influence of alcohol and other drugs. The band was forced to postpone a tour scheduled to begin a few days later, and Rossington was fined US$5,000 for the delay his actions caused to the band's schedule. The song "That Smell", written by Van Zant and Collins, was based on the wreck and Rossington's state of influence from drugs and alcohol that caused it.

Rossington was one of 20 passengers who survived the October 20, 1977, plane crash near McComb, Mississippi, that claimed the lives of Lynyrd Skynyrd members Ronnie Van Zant, Steve Gaines, Cassie Gaines, and three others. As the passengers braced for impact, Rossington recalls hearing what sounded like hundreds of baseball bats hitting the plane's fuselage as it began striking trees. The sound got louder and louder until Rossington was knocked unconscious; he awoke some time later on the ground with the plane's door on top of him. Days later, Rossington was informed in the hospital by his mother that Van Zant and the others had been killed. Rossington recovered from his injuries and played on stage again, with steel rods in his right arm and right leg.

Though in time Rossington fully recovered from the severe injuries sustained in the crash, he battled serious drug addiction for several years, largely the result of his heavy dependence on pain medication taken during his recovery. Rossington and Collins founded the Rossington Collins Band in 1980. The band released two albums, but disbanded in 1982 after the death of Collins' wife, Kathy. Along with his wife, Dale Krantz-Rossington, he then formed The Rossington Band, which released two albums in 1986 and 1988. Rossington continued to play with Lynyrd Skynyrd prior to his death in 2023 and by 2019, he became the last surviving original member of the band.

== Equipment ==
Rossington mostly played Les Pauls. His main guitar was a 1959 Gibson Les Paul which he had purchased from a woman whose boyfriend had left her and left behind his guitar. He named it "Bernice" in honor of his mother, whom he was extremely close to after the death of his father. Rossington played lead guitar on "Tuesday's Gone" and "Gimme Three Steps." Along with Collins, Rossington also provided the guitar work for "Simple Man". Besides Les Pauls, he used Gibson SGs. He played the slide guitar on "Free Bird" with a 1961 Gibson SG Les Paul Standard. The Gibson Custom Shop released a Gary Rossington Les Paul and a Gary Rossington SG Les Paul Standard. For most of his career, he played through Marshall and Peavey amplifiers.

== Personal life and death ==
Rossington married singer Dale Krantz in 1982 and they have two daughters. Rossington suffered a heart attack on October 8, 2015, after which two Lynyrd Skynyrd concerts had to be canceled. In July 2021, he underwent emergency heart surgery.

Rossington died at his home in Milton, Georgia, on March 5, 2023, at the age of 71.
