= Lynyrd Skynyrd discography =

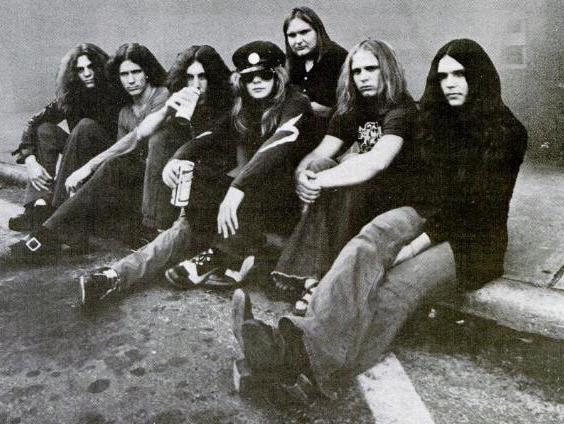
- Studio albums: 14
- Live albums: 6
- Compilation albums: 24
- Singles: 29
- Video albums: 5

Lynyrd Skynyrd is an American rock band originally formed in 1966, later named after the guitarist Gary Rossington's high school gym teacher Leonard Skinner. The band has released many studio, live, and other albums, along with several singles and video discs.

The band has sold 28 million albums in the US since 1991 when Nielsen SoundScan started tracking sales, not including album sales for the band's first 17 years.

== Albums ==
=== Studio albums ===
Year	Album information	Peak chart position											Certifications
Year	Album information	US	AUS	CAN	FIN	FRA	GER	NZ	NOR	SWE	SWI	UK	Certifications
1973	(Pronounced 'Lĕh-'nérd 'Skin-'nérd): Released: August 13, 1973; Label: Sounds of the South/MCA Records; Formats: CD, CS, LP	27	—	47	—	—	—	—	—	—	—	—	US: 2× Platinum; NZ: Platinum; UK: Silver
1974	Second Helping: Released: April 15, 1974; Label: Sounds of the South/MCA Records; Formats: CD, CS, LP	12	—	9	—	—	—	—	—	—	—	—	US: 2× Platinum; NZ: Platinum
1975	Nuthin' Fancy: Released: March 24, 1975; Label: MCA Records; Formats: CD, CS, LP	9	91	17	—	—	—	—	—	—	—	43	US: Platinum
1976	Gimme Back My Bullets: Released: February 2, 1976; Label: MCA Records; Formats: CD, CS, LP	20	—	1	—	—	—	—	—	50	—	34	US: Gold
1977	Street Survivors: Released: October 17, 1977; Label: MCA Records; Formats: CD, CS, LP	5	68	3	—	—	—	38	—	—	—	13	CAN: Gold; US: 2× Platinum
1991	Lynyrd Skynyrd 1991: Released: June 11, 1991; Label: Atlantic Records; Formats: CD, CS, LP	64	—	39	—	—	—	—	—	44	—	—	
1993	The Last Rebel: Released: February 16, 1993; Label: Atlantic Records; Formats: CD, CS, LP	64	—	23	—	—	80	—	—	33	18	—	
1994	Endangered Species: Released: August 9, 1994; Label: Capricorn Records; Formats: CD, LP	115	—	—	—	—	—	—	—	—	—	—	
1997	Twenty: Released: April 29, 1997; Label: CMC International; Formats: CD	97	—	—	12	—	70	—	36	—	—	—	
1999	Edge of Forever: Released: August 10, 1999; Label: SPV; Formats: CD	96	—	—	19	—	47	—	—	—	—	—	
2000	Christmas Time Again: Released: September 12, 2000; Label: Sanctuary Records; Formats: CD	—	—	—	—	—	—	—	—	—	—	—	
2003	Vicious Cycle: Released: May 20, 2003; Label: Sanctuary Records; Formats: CD, LP	30	—	—	30	150	44	—	—	—	—	—	
2009	God & Guns: Released: September 29, 2009; Label: Loud & Proud/Roadrunner Records; Formats: CD, LP	18	—	—	26	64	37	—	—	38	38	36	
2012	Last of a Dyin' Breed: Released: August 21, 2012; Label: Loud & Proud/Roadrunner Records; Formats: CD, LP	14	—	—	10	55	14	—	12	18	13	83	
"—" denotes albums that were released but did not chart.

=== Live albums ===
Year	Album information	Peak chart position										Certifications
Year	Album information	US	AUS	CAN	FIN	FRA	GER	NOR	SWE	SWI	UK	Certifications
1976	One More from the Road: Released: September 13, 1976; Label: MCA; Formats: 2xLP, CD	9	79	49	—	—	—	—	—	—	17	CAN: Gold; UK: Silver; US: 3× Platinum
1988	Southern by the Grace of God: Released: March 21, 1988; Label: MCA; Formats: CD	68	—	—	—	—	—	—	—	—	—	
1996	Southern Knights: Released: July 1, 1996; Label: SPV; Formats: 2xCD	—	—	—	—	—	—	—	—	—	—	
1998	Lyve from Steel Town: Released: June 2, 1998; Label: SPV; Formats: 2xCD	—	—	—	—	—	—	—	—	—	—	US: Gold
2004	Lynyrd Skynyrd Lyve: The Vicious Cycle Tour: Released: June 22, 2004; Label: Sanctuary Records; Formats: 2xCD	—	—	—	—	—	—	—	—	—	—	
2009	Authorized Bootleg Lynyrd Skynyrd Live / Cardiff Capitol Theatre – Cardiff, Wales Nov. 04 1975: Released: 2009; Label: Geffen Records; Formats: CD	—	—	—	—	—	—	—	—	—	—	
2009	Authorized Bootleg: Live at Winterland – San Francisco Mar. 07 1976: Released: 2009; Label: Geffen Records; Formats: CD	—	—	—	—	—	—	—	—	—	—	
2010	Live from Freedom Hall: Released: June 22, 2010; Label: Loud & Proud/Roadrunner Records; Formats: CD/DVD	—	—	—	—	175	74	—	—	—	—	
2015	One More for the Fans: Released: 2015; Label: Loud & Proud/Ear Music; Formats: 3xLP, 2xCD, DVD/Blu-ray	81	—	—	—	—	—	—	—	—	—	
2015	Pronounced Leh-Nerd Skin-Nerd & Second Helping – Live from Jacksonville at the Florida Theatre: Released: 2015; Label: Eagle Records; Formats: 2xCD	—	—	—	—	—	—	—	—	—	—	
2018	Live in Atlantic City: Released: 2018; Label: Ear Music; Formats: CD	—	—	—	—	—	—	—	—	—	—	
2019	The Last of the Street Survivors Farewell Tour: Released: 2019; Label: Curtis Loew Records; Formats: 2xCD	121	—	—	—	—	—	—	—	—	—	
2021	Live at Knebworth '76: Released: 2021; Label: Eagle Records; Formats: 2xLP/CD	—	—	—	—	187	—	—	—	—	—	
2025	Celebrating 50 Years – Live at the Ryman (Nashville, TN - November 13, 2022): Released: 2025; Label: Frontiers Records; Formats: 2xCD/DVD	—	—	—	—	—	—	—	—	—	—	
"—" denotes albums that were released but did not chart.

=== Compilation albums ===
Year	Album information	Peak chart position										Certifications
Year	Album information	US	AUS	CAN	FIN	FRA	GER	NOR	SWE	SWI	UK	Certifications
1978	Skynyrd's First and... Last: Released: September 5, 1978; Label: MCA; Formats: LP, CD	15	89	35	—	—	—	—	—	—	50	US: Platinum
1979	Gold & Platinum: Released: December 1979; Label: MCA; Formats: 2xLP, 2xCD	12	—	56	—	—	—	—	—	—	49	UK: Silver; US: 3× Platinum
1982	Best of the Rest: Released: 1982 (LP), October 25, 1990 (CD); Label: MCA; Formats: LP, CD	171	—	—	—	—	—	—	—	—	—	
1987	Legend: Released: October 5, 1987; Label: MCA; Formats: LP, Cassette, CD	41	—	—	—	—	—	—	—	—	—	US: Gold
1989	Skynyrd's Innyrds: Released: April 30, 1989; Label: MCA; Formats: LP, Cassette, CD	—	—	—	—	—	—	—	—	—	—	AUS: Gold: US: 5× Platinum
1991	Lynyrd Skynyrd (Box Set): Released: November 12, 1991; Label: MCA; Formats: 3xCD	—	—	—	—	—	—	—	—	—	—	US: Gold
1993	A Retrospective: Released: 1993; Label: MCA; Formats: CD	—	—	—	—	—	—	—	—	—	—	
1997	What's Your Name: Released: 1997; Label: MCA; Formats: CD	—	—	—	—	—	—	—	—	—	—	US: Platinum
1997	Old Time Greats: Released: 1997; Label: Repertoire Records; Formats: CD	—	—	—	—	—	—	—	—	—	—	
1998	Extended Versions: The Encore Collection: Released: 1998; Label: BMG Special Products; Formats: CD	—	—	—	—	—	—	—	—	—	—	US: Gold
1998	The Essential Lynyrd Skynyrd: Released: August 25, 1998; Label: MCA; Formats: 2xCD	—	—	—	—	—	—	—	—	—	—	UK: Silver; US: Platinum
1998	Skynyrd's First: The Complete Muscle Shoals Album: Released: November 17, 1998; Label: MCA; Formats: CD	—	—	—	—	—	—	—	—	—	—	
1999	20th Century Masters – The Millennium Collection: The Best of Lynyrd Skynyrd: Released: March 9, 1999; Label: MCA; Formats: CD	60	—	—	—	—	—	—	—	—	—	US: 2× Platinum
1999	Solo Flytes: Released: 1999; Label: MCA; Formats: CD	—	—	—	—	—	—	—	—	—	—	
1999	Classic Lynyrd Skynyrd: The Universal Masters Collection: Released: December 27, 1999; Label: MCA; Formats: CD	—	—	—	—	—	—	—	—	—	—	
2000	All Time Greatest Hits: Released: March 14, 2000; Label: MCA; Formats: CD	76	—	—	—	—	—	—	—	—	—	UK: Silver; US: Platinum
2000	Collectybles: Released: November 21, 2000; Label: MCA; Formats: 2xCD	—	—	—	—	—	—	—	—	—	—	
2000	Then and Now: Released: 2000; Label: MCA; Formats: CD	—	—	—	—	—	—	—	—	—	—	
2001	Lynyrd Skynyrd: The Collection: Released: 2001; Label: Spectrum Music; Formats: CD	—	—	—	—	—	—	—	—	—	—	UK: Gold
2003	Thyrty: Released: 2003; Label: MCA; Formats: 2xCD	16	—	—	—	—	—	—	—	—	—	US: Platinum
2005	Greatest Hits (first of that title): Released: 2005; Label: MCA; Formats: CD	—	—	—	—	—	—	—	—	—	47	
2005	Then and Now Volume Two: Released: 2005; Label: MCA; Formats: CD	—	—	—	—	—	—	—	—	—	—	
2008	Greatest Hits (second of that title): Released: August 18, 2008; Label: MCA; Formats: CD	—	—	—	—	—	—	29	—	—	16	UK: Gold
2010	Icon: Released: August 31, 2010; Label: Geffen/UMe; Formats: CD	138	—	—	—	—	—	—	—	—	—	US: Gold
2012	Southern Surroundings: The Ultymate Skynyrd Collection: Released: 2012; Label: Geffen/UMe; Formats: CD/DVD	—	—	—	—	—	—	—	—	—	—	
2017	The Broadcast Archive «3 CD set» (Radio Broadcast 1975/1994): Released: June 2, 2017; Label: The Broadcast Archive; Formats: 3xCD	—	—	—	—	—	—	—	—	—	—	
2023	Fyfty: Released: October 13, 2023; Label: Geffen/UMe; Formats: 4xCD	—	—	—	—	—	—	—	—	—	—	
"—" denotes albums that were released but did not chart.

== Singles ==
Year	Title	Peak chart position						Certifications	Album
Year	Title	US	US Main	AUT	CAN	SWI	UK	Certifications	Album
1969	"Need All My Friends" (demo) / "Michelle" (demo)	—	—	—	—	—	—		Non-album singles
1973	"Gimme Three Steps" / "Mr. Banker" (demo)	—	—	—	—	—	—		(pronounced 'lĕh-'nérd 'skin-'nérd)
1974	"Don't Ask Me No Questions" (remix) / "Take Your Time" (demo)	—	—	—	—	—	—		Second Helping
1974	"Sweet Home Alabama" / "Take Your Time" (demo)	8	—	56	6	51	31	RIAA: Gold; BPI: 3× Platinum; RMNZ: 8× Platinum	Second Helping
1974	"Free Bird" / "Down South Jukin'" (demo)	19	—	—	47	—	21	BPI: 2× Platinum; RMNZ: 4× Platinum	(pronounced 'lĕh-'nérd 'skin-'nérd)
1975	"Saturday Night Special" / "Made in the Shade"	27	—	—	63	—	—		Nuthin' Fancy
1976	"Double Trouble" / "Roll Gypsy Roll"	80	—	—	—	—	—		Gimme Back My Bullets
1976	"Gimme Back My Bullets" / "All I Can Do Is Write About It"	—	—	—	—	—	—		Gimme Back My Bullets
1976	"Gimme Three Steps" (live) / "Travellin' Man" (live)	—	—	—	—	—	—		One More from the Road
1976	"Free Bird" (live) / "Searching" (live)	38	—	—	—	—	—		One More from the Road
1977	"What's Your Name" / "I Know a Little"	13	—	—	6	—	—		Street Survivors
1977	"That Smell"	—	—	—	—	—	—		Street Survivors
1978	"You Got That Right" / "Ain't No Good Life"	69	—	—	63	—	—		Street Survivors
1978	"Down South Jukin'" / "Wino"	—	—	—	—	—	—		Skynyrd's First and... Last
1987	"Truck Drivin' Man" / "When You Got Good Friends"	—	12	—	—	—	—		Legend
1987	"Georgia Peaches"	—	—	—	—	—	—		Non-album singles
1988	"Swamp Music"	—	16	—	—	—	—		Non-album singles
1988	"Gimme Back My Bullets" / "Comin' Home"	—	—	—	—	—	—		Non-album singles
1991	"Smokestack Lightning"	—	2	—	77	—	—		Lynyrd Skynyrd 1991
1991	"Keeping the Faith"	—	10	—	—	—	—		Lynyrd Skynyrd 1991
1993	"Good Lovin's Hard to Find"	—	6	—	—	—	—		The Last Rebel
1993	"Born to Run"	—	37	—	—	—	—		The Last Rebel
1997	"Travellin' Man"	—	22	—	—	—	—		Twenty
1997	"Bring It On"	—	33	—	—	—	—		Twenty
1999	"Preacher Man"	—	26	—	—	—	—		Edge of Forever
2003	"Red White & Blue (Love It or Leave)"	—	27	—	—	—	—		Vicious Cycle
2009	"Still Unbroken"	—	40	—	—	—	—		God & Guns
2009	"Simple Life"	—	—	—	—	—	—		God & Guns
2010	"Skynyrd Nation"	—	—	—	—	—	—		God & Guns
2010	"That Ain't My America"	—	—	—	—	—	—		God & Guns
2012	"Last of a Dyin' Breed"	—	—	—	—	—	—		Last of a Dyin' Breed
2020	"Last of the Street Survivors"	—	—	—	—	—	—		Non-album single
"—" denotes singles that were released but did not chart.

=== Other certified songs ===
Year	Title	Certifications	Album
1973	"Tuesday's Gone"	RMNZ: Platinum	(pronounced 'lĕh-'nérd 'skin-'nérd)
1973	"Simple Man"	BPI: Gold; RMNZ: 4× Platinum	(pronounced 'lĕh-'nérd 'skin-'nérd)

== Videography ==
Year	Title	Certification
1988	Lynyrd Skynyrd Tribute Tour: Released: April 1988; Label: MCA Records; Formats: VHS	RIAA: Gold
1996	Freebird... The Movie: Released: August 13, 1996; Label: MCA Records; Formats: VHS	
1998	Lyve from Steel Town: Released: June 2, 1998; Label: CMC International; Formats: VHS	RIAA: Gold
2004	Lynyrd Skynyrd Lyve: The Vicious Cycle Tour: Released: June 22, 2004; Label: Sanctuary Records; Formats: DVD	RIAA: Gold
2007	Lynyrd Skynyrd: Live from Austin, TX: Released: June 5, 2007; Label: Sanctuary Records; Formats: DVD	RIAA: Gold
2015	'Lĕh-'nérd 'Skin-'nérd & Second Helping Live from Jacksonville at the Florida Theatre: Released: October 23, 2015; Label: Eagle; Formats: DVD/Blu-ray	
2019	The Last of the Street Survivors Farewell Tour: Released: December 5, 2019; Label: Curtis Loew Records; Formats: DVD/Blu-ray	
