= Thyrty: The 30th Anniversary Collection =

Thyrty

Greatest hits album by Lynyrd Skynyrd
- Released: 2003
- Genre: Hard rock, Southern rock
- Length: 2:31:45
- Producer: Lynyrd Skynyrd, Barry Beckett, Tom Dowd, Ben Fowler, Quin Ivy, Jimmy Johnson, Josh Leo, Andy McKaie, Ron Nevison, Ron Obrien, Tim Smith

Lynyrd Skynyrd chronology
Lynyrd Skynyrd Lyve: The Vicious Cycle Tour (2003)	Thyrty (2003)	Greatest Hits (2008)

Thyrty is a 2003 30th anniversary album by American Southern rock band Lynyrd Skynyrd. It consists of a two-disc set, with the final ten tracks on disc two from the post-plane crash lineup. It was certified gold and platinum by the RIAA on February 21, 2005. As a limited edition, the album peaked at number 16 on the Billboard 200. All tracks are full length remixed/remastered stereo studio versions.

== Track listing ==
=== Disc 1 ===
1. "Sweet Home Alabama" (Ed King, Gary Rossington, Ronnie Van Zant) – 4:45
2. "Need All My Friends" (Complete version) (Allen Collins, R. Van Zant) – 5:12
3. "Blues Medley" (B.B. King, Jules Taub, Jane Feather, Traditional) – 10:15 (Previously unreleased)
4. "Down South Jukin'" (Rossington, R. Van Zant) – 2:14
5. "Was I Right or Wrong?" (Rossington, R. Van Zant) – 5:24
6. "I Ain't the One" (Rossington, R. Van Zant) – 3:54
7. "Tuesday's Gone" (Collins, R. Van Zant) – 7:33
8. "Gimme Three Steps" (Collins, R. Van Zant) – 4:30
9. "Workin' for MCA" (King, R. Van Zant) – 4:47
10. "The Ballad of Curtis Loew" (Collins, R. Van Zant) – 4:51
11. "Call Me the Breeze" (J.J. Cale) – 5:08
12. "Saturday Night Special" (King, R. Van Zant) – 5:09
13. "All I Can Do Is Write About It" (Acoustic version) (Collins, R. Van Zant) – 4:24
14. "Free Bird" (Collins, Van Zant) – 9:10

=== Disc 2 ===
1. "Whiskey Rock-A-Roller" (Live) (King, Billy Powell, R. Van Zant) – 4:12
2. "Simple Man" (Live) (Rossington, R. Van Zant) – 6:42
3. "What's Your Name?" (Rossington, R. Van Zant) – 3:33
4. "That Smell" (Collins, R. Van Zant) – 5:49
5. "I Know A Little" (Steve Gaines) – 3:28
6. "You Got That Right" (Gaines, R. Van Zant) – 3:47
7. "Comin' Home" (Live) (Collins, R. Van Zant) – 6:36
8. "Swamp Music" (Live) (King, R. Van Zant) – 3:51
9. "Gimme Back My Bullets" (Live) (Rossington, R. Van Zant) – 5:05
10. "Smokestack Lightning" (Rossington, King, Johnny Van Zant, Todd Cerney) – 4:29
11. "The Last Rebel" (Rossington, J. Van Zant, Robert White Johnson, Michael Lunn) – 6:46
12. "Things Goin' On" (Acoustic version) (Rossington, R. Van Zant) – 3:00
13. "Talked Myself Right Into It" (J. Van Zant, Donnie Van Zant, Johnson, Pat Buchanan) – 3:26
14. "We Ain't Much Different" (Live) (Rossington, J. Van Zant, Rickey Medlocke, Hughie Thomasson, Mike Estes) – 3:42
15. "Workin'" (Rossington, J. Van Zant, Medlocke, Thomasson) – 4:54
16. "Mad Hatter" (Rossington, J. Van Zant, Medlocke, Thomasson, Tom Hambridge) – 5:37
- Disc 1, tracks 1 and 9–11 from Second Helping (1974)
- Disc 1, track 2 from Collectybles (2000)
- Disc 1, tracks 4–5 from Skynyrd's First and... Last (1978)
- Disc 1, tracks 6–8 and 14 from (Pronounced 'Lĕh-'nérd 'Skin-'nérd) (1973)
- Disc 1, track 12 from Nuthin' Fancy (1975)
- Disc 1, track 13 from the Lynyrd Skynyrd Box Set (1991)
- Disc 2, track 1 from One More from the Road (1976)
- Disc 2, track 2 from Legend (1987)
- Disc 2, tracks 3–6 from Street Survivors (1977)
- Disc 2, tracks 7–9 from Southern by the Grace of God (1988)
- Disc 2, track 10 from Lynyrd Skynyrd 1991 (1991)
- Disc 2, track 11 from The Last Rebel (1993)
- Disc 2, track 12 from Endangered Species (1994)
- Disc 2, track 13 from Twenty (1997)
- Disc 2, track 14 from Lyve from Steel Town (1998)
- Disc 2, track 15 from Edge of Forever (1999)
- Disc 2, track 16 from Vicious Cycle (2003)

==== Live songs ====
- Disc 2, tracks 1–2 recorded 7/7/1976 at the Fox Theatre in Atlanta, GA
- Disc 2, track 7 recorded 11/1/1987 at the Reunion Arena in Dallas, TX
- Disc 2, track 8 recorded 10/23/1987 at the Starwood Amphitheatre in Antioch, TN
- Disc 2, track 9 recorded 10/15/1987 at The Omni in Atlanta, GA (Mistakenly listed as 1997 in the booklet)
- Disc 2, track 14 recorded 7/15/1997 at the Coca-Cola Star Lake Amphitheatre in Burgettstown, PA

== Certifications ==
Region	Certification	Certified units/sales
United States (RIAA)	Platinum	500,000^{^}
^{^} Shipments figures based on certification alone.
