= Then and Now (Lynyrd Skynyrd album) =

2000 compilation album by Lynyrd Skynyrd

Compilation album by Lynyrd Skynyrd
- Released: 2000
- Recorded: 1997–1999
- Genre: Hard rock, Southern rock
- Length: 1:02:37
- Label: Sanctuary Records

Lynyrd Skynyrd chronology
Collectybles (2000)	Then and Now (2000)	Vicious Cycle (2003)

Then and Now is a compilation album by American rock group Lynyrd Skynyrd. The album features songs from the original lineup and newer hits from the post crash lineup.

== Track listing ==
1. "Saturday Night Special" (Live) (Ed King, Ronnie Van Zant) – 5:44
2. "Workin'" (Gary Rossington, Johnny Van Zant, Rickey Medlocke, Hughie Thomasson) – 4:54
3. "Preacher Man" (Rossington, Van Zant, Medlocke, Thomasson) – 4:34
4. "Tomorrow's Goodbye" (Rossington, Van Zant, Medlocke, Thomasson, Gary Burr) – 5:07
5. "That Smell" (Live) (Allen Collins, Van Zant) – 6:17
6. "Gone Fishin'" (Rossington, Van Zant, Medlocke, Thomasson) – 4:22
7. "Simple Man" (Live) (Rossington, Van Zant) – 7:46
8. "Voodoo Lake" (Van Zant, Chris Eddy, Bob Britt) – 4:37
9. "Sweet Home Alabama" (Live) (King, Rossington, Van Zant) – 7:12
10. "Free Bird" (Live) (Collins, Van Zant) – 13:32
- Tracks 1, 5, 7, and 9–10 from Lyve from Steel Town (1998)
- Tracks 2–4 and 6 from Edge of Forever (1999)
- Track 8 from Twenty (1997)
- Live songs recorded 7/15/1997 at the Coca-Cola Star Lake Amphitheatre in Burgettstown, Pennsylvania

== Then and Now: Volume Two ==
Then and Now: Volume Two

Compilation album by Lynyrd Skynyrd
- Released: 2005
- Recorded: 1997–2003
- Genre: Hard rock, southern rock
- Length: 56:13
- Label: Sanctuary Records

Then and Now: Volume Two a follow-up album was released in 2005, this again featured old and new tracks including tracks from 2003's Vicious Cycle album.

=== Track listing ===
1. "What's Your Name" (Live) (Rossington, Van Zant) – 3:38
2. "Gimme Three Steps" (Live) (Allen Collins, Ronnie Van Zant) – 4:56
3. "Red White & Blue" (Johnny Van Zant, Donnie Van Zant, Brad Warren, Brett Warren) – 5:31
4. "I Know a Little" (Live) (Steve Gaines) – 5:58
5. "That's How I Like It" (Gary Rossington, Johnny Van Zant, Rickey Medlocke, Hughie Thomasson, Eric Blair) – 4:33
6. "The Way" (Gary Rossington, Johnny Van Zant, Rickey Medlocke, Hughie Thomasson) – 5:32
7. "Tuesday's Gone" (Live) (Allen Collins, Ronnie Van Zant) – 7:02
8. "Call Me the Breeze" (Live) (J.J. Cale) – 6:17
9. "Lucky Man" (Gary Rossington, Johnny Van Zant, Rickey Medlocke, Hughie Thomasson) – 5:35
10. "The Ballad of Curtis Loew" (Live) (Allen Collins, Ronnie Van Zant) – 4:21
11. "We Ain't Much Different" (Gary Rossington, Johnny Van Zant, Rickey Medlocke, Hughie Thomasson, Mike Estes) – 3:44
- Studio tracks (except track 11) from Vicious Cycle (2003)
- Track 11 from Twenty
- Live tracks from Lynyrd Skynyrd Lyve: The Vicious Cycle Tour (2004) and recorded 7/11/2003 at the AmSouth Amphitheatre in Antioch, Tennessee
