= The Essential Lynyrd Skynyrd =

Compilation album by Lynyrd Skynyrd
- Released: August 25, 1998
- Recorded: 1971–1977
- Genre: Southern rock; hard rock
- Length: 2:10:47
- Label: MCA (1998); Geffen (2006)
- Producer: Ron O'Brien

Lynyrd Skynyrd chronology
Lyve from Steel Town (1998)	The Essential Lynyrd Skynyrd (1998)	20th Century Masters – The Millennium Collection: The Best of Lynyrd Skynyrd (1999)

Professional ratings
Review scores
Source	Rating
Allmusic	3/5 stars
Allmusic	4/5 stars

The Essential Lynyrd Skynyrd, is a two-disc compilation of Lynyrd Skynyrd in the peak years of its classic lineup (1971–1977). The double album was remastered and re-released in 2006 as part of Universal's Gold series.

== Track listing ==
=== Disc one ===
1. "Sweet Home Alabama" (Ed King, Gary Rossington, Ronnie Van Zant) – 4:45
2. "I Ain't the One" (Rossington, Van Zant) – 3:54
3. "Was I Right or Wrong?" (Rossington, Van Zant) – 5:24
4. "Gimme Three Steps" (Allen Collins, Van Zant) – 4:31
5. "Workin' for MCA" (King, Van Zant) – 4:48
6. "Simple Man" (Rossington, Van Zant) – 5:58
7. "Swamp Music" (King, Van Zant) – 3:32
8. "The Ballad of Curtis Loew" (Collins, Van Zant) – 4:52
9. "Saturday Night Special" (King, Van Zant) – 5:12
10. "Mr. Banker" (King, Rossington, Van Zant) – 5:22
11. "Comin' Home" (Original version) (Collins, Van Zant) – 5:30
12. "Call Me the Breeze" (J.J. Cale) – 5:09
13. "Free Bird" (Collins, Van Zant) – 9:10

=== Disc two ===
1. "What's Your Name?" (Rossington, Van Zant) – 3:33
2. "Whiskey Rock-a-Roller" (Live) (King, Billy Powell, Van Zant) – 4:16
3. "Tuesday's Gone" (Collins, Van Zant) – 7:34
4. "Double Trouble" (Collins, Van Zant) – 2:50
5. "I Know a Little" (Steve Gaines) – 3:28
6. "Four Walls of Raiford" (Undubbed demo) (Jeff Carlisi, Van Zant) – 4:14
7. "I Never Dreamed" (Gaines, Van Zant) – 5:21
8. "Gimme Back My Bullets" (Live) (Rossington, Van Zant) – 3:42
9. "You Got That Right" (Gaines, Van Zant) – 3:47
10. "All I Can Do Is Write About It" (Acoustic version) (Collins, Van Zant) – 4:24
11. "That Smell" (Collins, Van Zant) – 5:51
12. "Free Bird" (Live)" (Collins, Van Zant) – 13:41
- Disc 1, Tracks 1, 5, 7–8, 12 from Second Helping (1974)
- Disc 1, Tracks 2, 4, 6, and 13 and Disc 2, Track 3 from (Pronounced 'Lĕh-'nérd 'Skin-'nérd) (1973)
- Disc 1, Track 3 from Skynyrd's First and... Last (1978)
- Disc 1, Track 9 from Nuthin' Fancy (1975)
- Disc 1, Track 10 from Legend (1987)
- Disc 2, Tracks 1, 5, 7, 9, and 11 from Street Survivors (1977)
- Disc 2, Tracks 2 and 12 from One More from the Road (1976)
- Disc 2, Track 4 from Gimme Back My Bullets (1976)
- Disc 2, Tracks 6, 8, and 10 from the Lynyrd Skynyrd Box Set (1991)
- Disc 1, Track 11 is previously unreleased (1998)

==== Live songs ====
- Disc 2, Track 2 recorded 7/7/1976 at the Fox Theatre in Atlanta, Georgia
- Disc 2, Tracks 8 and 12 recorded 7/8/1976 at the Fox Theatre in Atlanta, Georgia

== Certifications ==
Region	Certification	Certified units/sales
United Kingdom (BPI)	Silver	60,000^{^}
United States (RIAA)	Platinum	500,000^{^}
^{^} Shipments figures based on certification alone.
