= Lynyrd Skynyrd Lyve: The Vicious Cycle Tour =

Live album and video by Lynyrd Skynyrd
- Released: November 18, 2003
- Recorded: July 11, 2003
- Venues: Amsouth Amphitheatre, Nashville, Tennessee
- Genres: Southern rock, hard rock
- Label: Sanctuary
- Producers: Ken Levitan, Ross Schilling, Ben Fowler

Lynyrd Skynyrd chronology
Vicious Cycle (2003)	Lynyrd Skynyrd Lyve: The Vicious Cycle Tour (2003)	Thyrty: The 30th Anniversary Collection (2003)

Alternate cover
- DVD version

Professional ratings
Review scores
Source	Rating
Allmusic	3.5/5 stars
The Village Voice	C+

Lynyrd Skynyrd Lyve: The Vicious Cycle Tour is the fifth live album and third video by American southern rock band Lynyrd Skynyrd.

It was recorded on July 11, 2003 at the Amsouth Amphitheater in Antioch, Nashville, Tennessee as part of their 30th anniversary tour supporting their twelfth studio album Vicious Cycle.

It was released on November 18, 2003 on DVD and was released on CD on June 22, 2004. The video releases were certified Gold by RIAA in 2004.

== Track listing ==
=== CD ===
Disc one
No.	Title	Writer(s)	Length
1.	"That's How I Like It"	Gary Rossington; Johnny Van Zant; Rickey Medlocke; Hughie Thomasson; Blair Daly	5:06
2.	"What's Your Name"	Rossington; Ronnie Van Zant	3:38
3.	"I Know A Little"	Steve Gaines	5:58
4.	"Pick 'Em Up"	J. Van Zant; Medlocke; Tom Hambridge	5:08
5.	"Simple Man"	Rossington; R. Van Zant	7:40
6.	"That Smell"	{{flatlist|: Allen Collins; R. Van Zant; JoJo Billingsley	6:46
7.	"Red White & Blue"	J. Van Zant; Donnie Van Zant; Brad Warren; Brett Warren	6:16
8.	"Down South Jukin'"	Rossington; R. Van Zant	1:36
9.	"Gimme Back My Bullets"	Rossington; R. Van Zant	2:12
10.	"Double Trouble"	Collins; R. Van Zant	1:46
11.	"The Ballad of Curtis Loew"	Collins; R. Van Zant	4:21
12.	"Tuesday's Gone"	Collins; R. Van Zant	7:02
13.	"Mississippi Kid"	Al Kooper; R. Van Zant; Bob Burns	4:03

Disc two
No.	Title	Writer(s)	Length
1.	"Workin'"	Rossington; J. Van Zant; Medlocke; Thomasson	5:51
2.	"Gimme Three Steps"	Collins; R. Van Zant	4:56
3.	"Call Me the Breeze"	J.J. Cale	6:17
4.	"Sweet Home Alabama"	Ed King; Rossington; R. Van Zant	6:37
5.	"The Way"	Rossington; J. Van Zant; Medlocke; Thomasson	5:57
6.	"Free Bird"	Collins; R. Van Zant	12:38
Total length:			1:43:43

=== DVD ===
No.	Title	Writer(s)	Length
1.	"That's How I Like It"	Rossington; J. Van Zant; Medlocke; Thomasson; Blair
2.	"What's Your Name"	Rossington; R. Van Zant
3.	"I Know A Little"	Gaines
4.	"Pick 'Em Up"	J. Van Zant; Medlocke; Hambridge
5.	"Simple Man"	Rossington; R. Van Zant
6.	"That Smell"	{{flatlist|: Collins; R. Van Zant; JoJo Billingsley
7.	"Red White & Blue"	J. Van Zant; D. Van Zant; Brad Warren; Brett Warren
8.	"Down South Jukin'"	Rossington; R. Van Zant
9.	"Gimme Back My Bullets"	Rossington; R. Van Zant
10.	"Double Trouble"	Collins; R. Van Zant
11.	"The Ballad of Curtis Loew"	Collins; R. Van Zant
12.	"Tuesday's Gone"	Collins; R. Van Zant
13.	"Mississippi Kid"	Kooper; R. Van Zant; Burns
14.	"Workin'"	Rossington; J. Van Zant; Medlocke; Thomasson
15.	"Gimme Three Steps"	Collins; R. Van Zant
16.	"Call Me the Breeze"	Cale
17.	"Sweet Home Alabama"	King; Rossington; R. Van Zant
18.	"Travelin' Man"	R. Van Zant; Leon Wilkeson
19.	"The Way"	Rossington; J. Van Zant; Medlocke; Thomasson
20.	"Free Bird"	Collins; R. Van Zant
21.	"Lucky Man (End credits)"	Rossington; J. Van Zant; Medlocke; Thomasson

== Personnel ==
Lynyrd Skynyrd

- Johnny Van Zant - Lead vocals
- Gary Rossington - Guitar
- Billy Powell - Keyboards, piano
- Rickey Medlocke - Guitar, mandolin, vocals
- Hughie Thomasson - Guitar, vocals
- Ean Evans - Bass, vocals
- Michael Cartellone - Drums
- Dale Krantz-Rossington - Background vocals
- Carol Chase - Background vocals

Additional personnel

- Jim Horn – saxophone (leader)
- Samuel B. Levine – saxophone
- Steve G. Patrick – trumpet
- Connie Ellisor – violinist (leader/arranger)
- James Grosjean – violinist
- Anthony La Marchina – cello
- Pamela Sixfin – violin
- Alan R. Umstead – violin
- Mary Kathryn Van Osdale – violin
- Steve "Boxcar" Traum – harmonica

== Certifications ==
Video certifications for Lynyrd Skynyrd Lyve!
Region	Certification	Certified units/sales
United States (RIAA)	Gold	50,000^{^}
^{^} Shipments figures based on certification alone.
