= 20th Century Masters – The Millennium Collection: The Best of Lynyrd Skynyrd =

20th Century Masters: The Best of Lynyrd Skynyrd

Greatest hits album by Lynyrd Skynyrd
- Released: March 9, 1999
- Genre: Southern rock
- Length: 47:02
- Label: MCA

Lynyrd Skynyrd chronology
The Essential Lynyrd Skynyrd (1998)	20th Century Masters: The Best of Lynyrd Skynyrd (1999)	Edge of Forever (1999)

Professional ratings
Review scores
Source	Rating
AllMusic	4.5/5 stars
Rolling Stone	3.5/5 stars

20th Century Masters – The Millennium Collection: The Best of Lynyrd Skynyrd is a compilation album by Lynyrd Skynyrd, released in 1999 as a part of the modern effort at recapturing the classics and repackaging them for newer generations to be exposed to and enjoy. It compiles some of the band's greatest and most recognizable hits. The album was certified Double Platinum by the RIAA in 2006, and has sold 2,929,000 copies in the U.S. as of August 2013.

== Track listing ==
1. "Sweet Home Alabama" (Ed King, Gary Rossington, Ronnie Van Zant) - 4:45
2. "What's Your Name?" (Rossington, Van Zant) - 3:32
3. "Gimme Three Steps" (Allen Collins, Van Zant) - 4:30
4. "Double Trouble" (Collins, Van Zant) - 2:50
5. "You Got That Right" (Steve Gaines, Van Zant) - 3:47
6. "Saturday Night Special" (King, Van Zant) - 5:09
7. "That Smell" (Collins, Van Zant) - 5:49
8. "Swamp Music" (King, Van Zant) - 3:33
9. "I Ain't the One" (Rossington, Van Zant) - 3:54
10. "Free Bird" (Collins, Van Zant) - 9:10
- Tracks 1 and 8 from Second Helping (1974)
- Tracks 2, 5, and 7 from Street Survivors (1977)
- Tracks 3 and 9-10 from (Pronounced 'Lĕh-'nérd 'Skin-'nérd) (1973)
- Track 4 from Gimme Back My Bullets (1976)
- Track 6 from Nuthin' Fancy (1975)

== Charts ==
=== Weekly charts ===
Chart (2011)	Peak position
US Billboard 200	60
US Top Catalog Albums (Billboard)	3

=== Year-end charts ===
Chart (2011)	Position
US Billboard 200	173
Chart (2012)	Position
US Billboard 200	164

== Certifications ==
Region	Certification	Certified units/sales
United States (RIAA)	2× Platinum	2,000,000^{^}
^{^} Shipments figures based on certification alone.
