= The Last of the Street Survivors Farewell Tour =

2018–23 concert tour by Lynyrd Skynyrd

The Last of the Street Survivors Farewell Tour/Big Wheels Keep On Turnin' Tour
- Tour by Lynyrd Skynyrd
- Start date: May 4, 2018
- End date: July 15, 2023
- Legs: 4

Lynyrd Skynyrd concert chronology
- Lynyrd Skynyrd 2016 North American Tour; The Last of the Street Survivors Farewell Tour/Big Wheels Keep On Turnin' Tour (2018–23); Sharp Dressed Simple Man Tour (2023-24)

The Last of the Street Survivors Farewell Tour was a concert tour by American Southern rock band Lynyrd Skynyrd. It was originally intended to be the final tour conducted by the band. It began May 4, 2018, at the Coral Sky Amphitheatre in West Palm Beach, Florida and was scheduled to end on October 24, 2020, at Epic Center Festival in Charlotte, North Carolina. The band utilized a plethora of opening acts, including Bad Company, Kid Rock, and Hank Williams Jr., throughout the tour.

All tour dates between June 2020 and October 2020 were rescheduled to a later date in 2021 due the COVID-19 pandemic. When the tour dates were rescheduled, the band renamed the tour the Big Wheels Keep On Turnin' Tour, hinting that it might not actually be their final tour. On March 5, 2023, guitarist and longest-remaining original member Gary Rossington died, making this the final tour with his involvement.

== Set list ==
The following set list was taken from the May 5, 2018, performance in Tampa, Florida and may not be representative of all shows on the tour.

1. "Skynyrd Nation"
2. "Workin' For MCA"
3. "What's Your Name"
4. "Double Trouble"
5. "Travelin' Man"
6. "That Smell"
7. "I Know A Little"
8. "Whiskey Rock-A-Roller"
9. "Saturday Night Special"
10. "The Ballad of Curtis Loew"
11. "Tuesday's Gone"
12. "Don't Ask Me No Questions"
13. "Simple Man"
14. "Gimme Three Steps"
15. "Call Me the Breeze"
16. "Sweet Home Alabama"

Encore

17. "Free Bird"

== Tour dates ==
Date	City	Country	Venue	Opening acts
North America
May 4, 2018	West Palm Beach	United States	Coral Sky Amphitheatre	Molly Hatchet; Blackfoot Jamey Johnson
May 5, 2018	Tampa	United States	MidFlorida Credit Union Amphitheatre	Bobby Lee Rodgers; Blackfoot; Jimmie Vaughan
May 11, 2018	Dallas	United States	Dos Equis Pavilion	Outlaws; Bad Company
May 12, 2018	The Woodlands	United States	Cynthia Woods Mitchell Pavilion	Outlaws; Bad Company
May 18, 2018	Phoenix	United States	Ak-Chin Pavilion	Outlaws; Bad Company
May 19, 2018	Chula Vista	United States	Mattress Firm Amphitheatre	The Georgia Satellites Outlaws; Jamestown Revival
May 25, 2018	Mountain View	United States	Shoreline Amphitheatre	Outlaws; Bad Company; Blackberry Smoke
May 26, 2018	San Bernardino	United States	Glen Helen Amphitheater	Bad Company; Blackberry Smoke
June 22, 2018	Holmdel	United States	PNC Bank Arts Center	Atlanta Rhythm Section; Peter Wolf
June 23, 2018	Wantagh	United States	Northwell Health at Jones Beach Theater	Atlanta Rhythm Section; Peter Wolf
June 29, 2018	Raleigh	United States	Coastal Credit Union Music Park	.38 Special; Cheap Trick; CJ Solar
June 30, 2018	Charlotte	United States	PNC Music Pavilion	.38 Special; CJ Solar; Hank Williams Jr.
July 6, 2018	Virginia Beach	United States	Veterans United Home Loans Amphitheater	.38 Special; Cheap Trick; Foghat
July 7, 2018	Bristow	United States	Jiffy Lube Live	.38 Special; Foghat; Atlanta Rhythm Section
July 13, 2018	Darien Center	United States	Darien Lake Amphitheater	The Charlie Daniels Band; Marshall Tucker Band; Jamey Johnson
July 14, 2018	Hartford	United States	Xfinity Theatre	The Charlie Daniels Band; Marshall Tucker Band; Jamey Johnson
July 20, 2018	Mansfield	United States	Xfinity Center	Marshall Tucker Band.38 Special; Wild Adriatic
July 21, 2018	Bethel	United States	Bethel Woods Center for the Arts	Marshall Tucker Band.38 Special; Wild Adriatic
July 27, 2018	Cuyahoga Falls	United States	Blossom Music Center	Blackberry Smoke; Marshall Tucker Band; Tom Hambridge
July 28, 2018	Hershey	United States	Hersheypark Stadium	Blackberry Smoke; Tom Hambridge; Hank Williams Jr.
August 3, 2018	Tinley Park	United States	Hollywood Casino Amphitheater	Marshall Tucker Band.38 Special; Jamey Johnson
August 4, 2018	Noblesville	United States	Ruoff Mortgage Music Center	Marshall Tucker Band.38 Special; Jamey Johnson
August 6, 2018 (Note: This concert is part of the 2018 Sturgis Motorcycle Rally)	Sturgis	United States	Buffalo Chip Campground	
August 10, 2018	Clarkston	United States	DTE Energy Music Theatre	The Charlie Daniels Band; Marshall Tucker Band; Jamey Johnson
August 11, 2018	Toronto	Canada	Budweiser Stage	Blackfoot.38 Special; ZZ Top
August 17, 2018	Cincinnati	United States	Riverbend Music Center	.38 Special; Hank Williams Jr. The Steel Woods
August 18, 2018	Maryland Heights	United States	Hollywood Casino Amphitheater	.38 Special; Hank Williams Jr. The Steel Woods
August 24, 2018	Syracuse	United States	Lakeview Amphitheater	Marshall Tucker Band; Hank Williams Jr.38 Special
August 25, 2018	Burgettstown	United States	KeyBank Pavilion	Marshall Tucker Band; Hank Williams Jr.38 Special
August 31, 2018	Pelham	United States	Oak Mountain Amphitheatre	Hank Williams Jr. Blackberry Smoke
September 1, 2018	Atlanta	United States	Cellairis Amphitheatre	Hank Williams Jr. Blackberry Smoke; Marshall Tucker Band
September 2, 2018	Jacksonville	United States	EverBank Field	Kid Rock; Jason Aldean Marshall Tucker Band The Charlie Daniels Band Blackberry Smoke
September 22, 2018 (Note: This concert is part of the iHeartRadio Music Festival)	Las Vegas	United States	T-Mobile Arena	
September 28, 2018	Rogers	United States	Arkansas Music Pavilion	Marshall Tucker Band Jason D. Williams
September 29, 2018	Wichita	United States	Intrust Bank Arena	Marshall Tucker Band
October 5, 2018	Saint Paul	United States	Xcel Energy Center	Jamey Johnson Bad Company
October 6, 2018	Lincoln	United States	Pinnacle Bank Arena	Jamey Johnson Bad Company
October 12, 2018	Sioux Falls	United States	Denny Sanford Premier Center	Marshall Tucker Band Dillon Carmichael
October 13, 2018	Cedar Rapids	United States	US Cellular Center	Marshall Tucker Band
October 19, 2018	Green Bay	United States	Resch Center	Marshall Tucker Band Jacob Powell
October 20, 2018	Toledo	United States	Huntington Center	Marshall Tucker Band
October 25, 2018	Pelham	United States	Oak Mountain Amphitheatre	Hank Williams Jr.
October 26, 2018	Nashville	United States	Bridgestone Arena	Bad Company Jamey Johnson
October 27, 2018	Evansville	United States	The Ford Center	Marshall Tucker Band
November 2, 2018	Kansas City	United States	Sprint Center	Marshall Tucker Band Jamey Johnson
November 3, 2018	Peoria	United States	Peoria Civic Center	Marshall Tucker Band
November 9, 2018	Grand Rapids	United States	Van Andel Arena	Jamey Johnson
November 10, 2018	Louisville	United States	KFC Yum! Center	Jamey Johnson Marshall Tucker Band
November 16, 2018	Baltimore	United States	Royal Farms Arena	Marshall Tucker Band Kenton Bryant
November 17, 2018	Huntington	United States	Big Sandy Superstore Arena	Marshall Tucker Band Kenton Bryant
November 30, 2018	Wilkes-Barre	United States	Mohegan Sun Arena at Casey Plaza	Marshall Tucker Band
December 1, 2018	Atlantic City	United States	Boardwalk Hall	Marshall Tucker Band
December 7, 2018	Baton Rouge	United States	Raising Cane's River Center Arena	A Thousand Horses Dillon Carmichael
December 8, 2018	Biloxi	United States	Mississippi Coast Coliseum	A Thousand Horses Dillon Carmichael
December 31, 2018	Thackerville	United States	Winstar World Casino	
January 8, 2019 (Note: This concert is part of Southern Rock Cruise)	Cozumel	Mexico	Norwegian Pearl	
March 2, 2019	Ottawa	Canada	Canadian Tire Centre	Randy Bachman
March 3, 2019	Windsor	Canada	The Colosseum	Randy Bachman
March 5, 2019	London	Canada	Budweiser Gardens	Randy Bachman
March 8, 2019	Winnipeg	Canada	Bell MTS Place	Randy Bachman
March 9, 2019	Regina	Canada	Brandt Centre	Randy Bachman
March 12, 2019	Edmonton	Canada	Rogers Place	Randy Bachman
March 13, 2019	Calgary	Canada	Scotiabank Saddledome	Randy Bachman
March 15, 2019	Abbotsford	Canada	Abbotsford Centre	Randy Bachman
April 27, 2019 (Note: This concert is part of Stagecoach Festival)	Indio	United States	Empire Polo Grounds	Stagecoach Festival
May 10, 2019	Tuscaloosa	United States	Tuscaloosa Amphitheater	Black Stone Cherry Cody Jinks
May 11, 2019 (Note: This concert is part of Kaaboo Texas 2019)	Arlington	United States	AT&T Stadium	
May 17, 2019	New Orleans	United States	Smoothie King Center	Hank Williams Jr. Tucker Beathard
May 18, 2019	Lafayette	United States	Cajundome	Hank Williams Jr. Tucker Beathard
May 24, 2019	Uncasville	United States	Mohegan Sun Arena	Wild Adriatic
May 31, 2019	Gilford	United States	Bank of New Hampshire Pavilion	Hank Williams Jr. Hannah Dasher
June 1, 2019	Bangor	United States	Darling's Waterfront Pavilion	Hank Williams Jr. Hannah Dasher
Europe
June 15, 2019 (Note: This concert is part of Holland International Blues Festival)	Grolloo	Netherlands	Blues Village	
June 17, 2019	Erfurt	Germany	Messehalle	
June 18, 2019	Berlin	Germany	Max-Schmeling-Halle	Blackberry Smoke
June 19, 2019	Frankfurt	Germany	Festhalle Frankfurt	
June 21, 2019 (Note: This concert is part of Graspop Metal Meeting)	Dessel	Belgium	Boeretang	
June 22, 2019 (Note: This concert is part of Rock the Ring)	Hinwil	Switzerland	Autobahnkreisel	
June 23, 2019 (Note: This concert is part of Hellfest)	Clisson	France	Val de Moine	
June 26, 2019	Glasgow	Scotland	SSE Hydro Arena	Massive Wagons; Status Quo
June 27, 2019	Manchester	England	Manchester Arena	Massive Wagons; Status Quo
June 29, 2019	London	England	SSE Arena	Massive Wagons; Status Quo
June 30, 2019	Birmingham	England	Resorts World Arena	Massive Wagons; Status Quo
North America
July 6, 2019 (Note: This concert is part of Festival d'été de Québec)	Quebec City	Canada	Plaines d'Abraham	
July 13, 2019	Canadaigua	United States	Constellation Brands Marvin Sands PAC	
July 14, 2019	Forest Hills	United States	Forest Hills Stadium	
July 19, 2019	Welch	United States	Treasure Island Resort & Casino	
July 20, 2019 (Note: This concert is part of Moondance Jam)	Walker	United States	Moondance Jam	
July 23, 2019 (Note: This concert is part of California Mid-State Fair)	Paso Robles	United States	Chumash Grandstand Arena	Chris Janson
July 26, 2019	Ridgefield	United States	Sunlight Supply Amphitheater	
July 27, 2019	Auburn	United States	White River Amphitheatre	
August 9, 2019	Albuquerque	United States	Isleta Amphitheater	
August 23, 2019	Irvine	United States	Five Point Amphitheater	ZZ Top Cheap Trick
August 30, 2019	Camden	United States	BB&T Pavilion	Hank Williams Jr.
August 31, 2019	Saratoga Springs	United States	Saratoga Performing Arts Center	Hank Williams Jr.
September 13, 2019	Southaven	United States	Bank Plus Amphitheater	Cody Jinks
September 14, 2019	Atlanta	United States	Verizon Amphitheater	Cody Jinks
September 20, 2019	Salt Lake City	United States	USANA Amphitheater	
September 21, 2019	Denver	United States	Fiddler's Green Amphitheatre	
September 27, 2019	Jackson	United States	Brandon Amphitheater	Cody Jinks
September 28, 2019	Orange Beach	United States	The Wharf Amphitheater	Cody Jinks
October 11, 2019 (Note: This concert is part of Exit 111 Festival)	Manchester	United States	Great Stage Park	Exit 111 Festival
October 12, 2019	Little Rock	United States	First Security Amphitheater	
October 16, 2019 (Note: This concert is part of Zoomtopia)	San Jose	United States	San Jose McEnery Convention Center	
October 18, 2019	Las Vegas	United States	T-Mobile Arena	Bad Company
October 19, 2019	Wheatland	United States	Toyota Amphitheatre	Grand Funk Railroad The Georgia Satellites
November 30, 2019	Hollywood	United States	Seminole Hard Rock Hotel & Casino Hollywood	
North America
March 7, 2020	Savannah	United States	Martin Luther King Arena	The Marshall Tucker Band
March 8, 2020 (Note: This concert is part of Florida Strawberry Festival)	Plant City	United States	Florida Strawberry Festival Grounds	
Europe (Postponed due to Covid-19 Pandemic)
~~June 28, 2020~~	Verona	Italy	Rock the Castle	
~~June 29, 2020~~	Nîmes	France	Festival de Nîmes	
~~July 1, 2020~~	Madrid	Spain	Palacio Vistalegre	
~~July 2, 2020~~	Barcelona	Spain	Rock Fest Barcelona	
~~July 4, 2020~~	Lucca	Italy	Piazza Napoleone	
~~July 6, 2020~~	Boulogne-Billancourt	France	La Seine Musicale	
~~July 8, 2020~~	Munich	Germany	Tollwood	
~~July 9, 2020~~	Wetzikon	Switzerland	Eishalle	
~~July 11, 2020~~	Halle	Germany	Freilichtbühne Peissnitz	
~~July 14, 2020~~	Chemnitz	Germany	Theaterplatz	
~~July 15, 2020~~	Oberhausen	Germany	Konig-Pilsener Arena	
~~July 16, 2020~~	Tilburg	Netherlands	Poppodium 013	
~~July 18, 2020~~	Maidstone	England	Mote Park	
North America (Postponed due to Covid-19 Pandemic)
~~August 14, 2020~~	Fresno	United States	Save Mart Center	
~~August 20–24, 2020~~	Orlando	United States	Lynyrd Skynyrd & Frynds Jam: A Family Reunion at Rosen Shingle Creek	Styx, Black Stone Cherry, Charlie Daniels Band
~~September 11, 2020~~	Allentown	United States	PPL Center	Travis Tritt
~~September 12, 2020~~	Providence	United States	Dunkin' Donuts Center	Travis Tritt
~~September 18, 2020~~	Fort Wayne	United States	Allen County Coliseum	Travis Tritt
~~September 19, 2020~~	Madison	United States	Veterans Memorial Coliseum	Travis Tritt
~~October 2, 2020~~	Reno	United States	Reno Events Center	Travis Tritt
~~October 16, 2020~~	Tupelo	United States	BancorpSouth Arena	Travis Tritt
~~October 17, 2020~~	Bossier City	United States	CenturyLink Center	Travis Tritt
~~October 23, 2020~~	Huntsville	United States	Von Braun Center	Travis Tritt
~~October 24, 2020~~	Cape Girardeau	United States	Show Me Center	Travis Tritt
North America (Rescheduled dates)
June 4, 2021 (Note: This concert is part of Gulf Coast Jam)	Panama City Beach	United States	Frank Brown Park	
June 13, 2021 (Note: This concert is part of Country Thunder)	Forest City	United States	Heritage Park of North Iowa	
June 18, 2021	Fort Worth	United States	Billy Bob's Texas	
June 19, 2021	Fort Worth	United States	Billy Bob's Texas	
July 22, 2021 (Note: This concert is part of Twin Cities Summer Jam)	Shakopee	United States	Canterbury Park	
July 23, 2021 (Note: This concert was part of the North Dakota State Fair)	Minot	United States	North Dakota State Fair	
August 22, 2021 (Note: This concert is part of Barefoot Country Music Fest)	Wildwood	United States	Wildwood Beach	
August 27, 2021	Holmdel	United States	PNC Bank Arts Center	
August 28, 2021	Saratoga Springs	United States	Saratoga Performing Arts Center	
September 4, 2021	Durant	United States	Choctaw Grand Theater	
September 17, 2021	Selbyville	United States	Freeman Arts Pavilion	
September 18, 2021	Doswell	United States	Innsbrook After Hours	
September 19, 2021	Bethel	United States	Bethel Woods Center for the Arts	
September 23, 2021	Mansfield	United States	Xfinity Center	Damon Johnson Tesla
September 27, 2021	Morrison	United States	Red Rocks Amphitheater	Tesla
October 1, 2021	Irvine	United States	Irvine Meadows Amphitheatre	
October 2, 2021	Laughlin	United States	Laughlin Event Center	
October 8, 2021	Noblesville	United States	Ruoff Music Center	
October 9, 2021	Cincinnati	United States	Riverbend Music Center	
October 23, 2021	Atlanta	United States	Cellairis Amphitheatre at Lakewood	
November 5, 2021	Knoxville	United States	Thompson–Boling Arena	
November 6, 2021	Charleston	United States	Charleston Coliseum & Convention Center	
November 13, 2021	Greensboro	United States	Greensboro Coliseum Complex	
November 14, 2021 (Note: This concert is part of Welcome to Rockville)	Daytona Beach	United States	Daytona International Speedway	
November 19, 2021	Bossier City	United States	Brookshire Grocery Arena	
November 20, 2021	Tupelo	United States	BancorpSouth Arena	
April 9, 2022 (Note: This concert is part of Arizona Bike Week)	Scottsdale	United States	WestWorld of Scottsdale	
May 13, 2022 (Note: This concert is part of L.A. County Fair)	Pomona	United States	Fairplex	
May 14, 2022	Fresno	United States	Chukchansi Park	
May 28, 2022 (Note: This concert is part of Tampa Bay Margarita And Music Festival)	Tampa	United States	Julian B. Lane Riverfront Park	
May 29, 2022 (Note: This concert is part of Circle K Speed Street)	Charlotte	United States	Charlotte Motor Speedway	
June 3, 2022 (Note: This concert is part of Let's Go Music Festival)	Crownsville	United States	Anne Arundel County Fairgrounds	
June 4, 2022	Wantagh	United States	Northwell Health at Jones Beach Theater	
July 1, 2022	Gilford	United States	Bank of New Hampshire Pavilion	
July 2, 2022	Bridgeport	United States	Hartford Healthcare Amphitheater	
July 3, 2022	Bangor	United States	Maine Savings Amphitheater	
July 8, 2022	Atlantic City	United States	Ocean Casino Resort - Ovation Hall	
July 9, 2022	Syracuse	United States	St. Joseph's Health Amphitheater	
July 15, 2022 (Note: This concert is part of Festival of the Lakes)	Hammond	United States	The Pavilion at Wolf Lake Memorial Park	
July 16, 2022	Moline	United States	Taxslayer Center	
July 17, 2022 (Note: This concert is part of WTUE Birthday Bash)	Kettering	United States	Fraze Pavilion	
July 22, 2022	Youngstown	United States	Covelli Centre	
July 23, 2022 (Note: This concert is part of Kingsport Fun Fest)	Kingsport	United States	Dobyns-Bennett Stadium	
August 6, 2022 (Note: This concert is part of Magic City Blues Festival)	Billings	United States	First Interstate Arena at MetraPark	
August 7, 2022 (Note: This concert is part of the 2022 Sturgis Motorcycle Rally)	Sturgis	United States	Sturgis Buffalo Chip	
August 26, 2022	Doswell	United States	Afterhours Concerts at the Meadow Event Park	
August 27, 2022	Niagara Falls	United States	Seneca Niagara Casino and Hotel	
September 9, 2022	Lafayette	United States	Cajundome	
September 10, 2022	Biloxi	United States	Mississippi Coast Coliseum	
September 16, 2022 (Note: This concert is part of the Allegan County Fair)	Allegan	United States	Allegan County Fairgrounds	
September 17, 2022	Terre Haute	United States	The Mill	
September 18, 2022 (Note: This concert is part of Born & Raised Music Festival)	Pryor	United States	Pryor Festival Grounds	
September 22, 2022 (Note: This concert is part of Bone Bash)	Concord	United States	Concord Pavilion	
September 23, 2022	Sparks	United States	Nugget Event Center	
September 25, 2022 (Note: This concert is part of Washington State Fair)	Puyallup	United States	Washington State Fairgrounds	
September 26, 2022	Airway Heights	United States	Northern Quest Resort & Casino	
September 28, 2022	Hollywood	United States	Seminole Hard Rock Hotel and Casino	
September 30, 2022	Allentown	United States	PPL Center	
October 2, 2022 (Note: This concert is part of The Big E)	West Springfield	United States	The Big E Arena	
October 16, 2022	Hollywood	United States	Seminole Hard Rock and Casino	
November 13, 2022	Nashville	United States	Ryman Auditorium	
December 1, 2022	Estero	United States	Hertz Arena (Boots on the Sand, Hurricane Ian Relief Concert)	
December 9, 2022	Las Vegas	United States	The Theater at Virgin Hotels	
December 10, 2022	Las Vegas	United States	The Theater at Virgin Hotels	
February 23, 2023	San Antonio	United States	San Antonio Stock Show & Rodeo	
March 12, 2023	Plant City	United States	Florida Strawberry Festival	
April 29, 2023	Brandon	United States	Jubilee Days - Brandon Amphitheater	
May 5, 2023	West Panama City Beach	United States	Thunder Beach at Frank Brown Park	
May 19, 2023	Bushkill	United States	Lost Highway Motorcycle Show and Concert	
May 20, 2023	Cleveland	United States	Jacobs Pavilion at Nautica	
May 27, 2023	Laughlin	United States	Laughlin Event Center	
June 16, 2023	Santa Rosa	United States	Country Summer Music Festival 2023	
June 17, 2023	Santa Rosa	United States	Country Summer Music Festival 2023	
June 18, 2023	Santa Rosa	United States	Country Summer Music Festival 2023	
July 14, 2023	Prior Lake	United States	Lakefront Music Fest	
July 15, 2023	West Fargo	United States	Red River Valley Fair	

=== Cancelled shows ===
Date	City	Country	Venue	Reason
July 12, 2019	Edenvale, Ontario	Canada	Edenvale Airport	Festival cancelled
August 9, 2021	Canton, Ohio	United States	Tom Benson Hall of Fame Stadium	Rickey Medlocke tested positive for COVID-19.
August 10, 2021	Jackson, Michigan	United States	Jackson County Fair	Rickey Medlocke tested positive for COVID-19.
August 13, 2021	Atlanta, Ga	United States	Cellairis Amphitheatre at Lakewood	Rickey Medlocke tested positive for COVID-19.
August 14, 2021 (Note: This concert would've been part of Rock The South)	Cullman, Alabama	United States	Festival Site	Rickey Medlocke tested positive for COVID-19.
August 19, 2021	Canandaigua, New York	United States	CMAC	Rickey Medlocke tested positive for COVID-19.
August 20, 2021	Bethel, New York	United States	Bethel Woods Center for the Arts	Rickey Medlocke tested positive for COVID-19.
September 3, 2021 (Note: This concert would've been part of the Touchdowns and Tunes Tailgate Party)	Paducah, Kentucky	United States	Carson Park	Unforeseen Circumstances
May 20, 2022	Huntsville, Alabama	United States	Orion Amphitheater	Scheduling conflict
May 21, 2022	Fort Campbell, Ky	United States	Fort Campbell	Weather conditions
June 10, 2022	Middletown, NY	United States	Orange County Fair Speedway	Show postponed to October 1 due to COVID-19 diagnosis, then cancelled.
June 11, 2022	Allentown, Pennsylvania	United States	PPL Center	Postponed due to COVID-19 diagnosis.
July 26, 2022 (Note: This concert would have been part of the California Mid-State Fair.)	Paso Robles, California	United States	California Mid-State Fair	Cancelled due to unforeseen circumstances.
