= Live at the Cardiff Capitol Theatre =

Live at the Cardiff Capitol Theater

Live album by Lynyrd Skynyrd
- Released: March 31, 2009
- Recorded: November 4, 1975
- Genre: Rock, Southern rock, blues-rock
- Length: 49:39
- Label: Geffen Records

Lynyrd Skynyrd chronology
Nuthin' Fancy (1975)	Live at the Cardiff Capitol Theater (2009)	Gimme Back My Bullets (1976)

Live at the Cardiff Capitol Theater is a live concert recording of Lynyrd Skynyrd during a European tour in support of their third album, Nuthin' Fancy. It was released by Geffen Records alongside Authorized Bootleg: Live In Winterland, San Francisco, CA, 3/07/76 which captures a concert four months later. This concert took place at the Capitol Theatre in Cardiff, Wales on November 4, 1975.

== Track listing ==
1. "Double Trouble" – 3:02
2. "I Ain't the One" – 3:49
3. "The Needle and the Spoon" – 4:41
4. "Saturday Night Special" – 5:24
5. "Gimme Three Steps" – 5:27
6. "Same Old Blues Again" - 4:31
7. "Simple Man" - 6:14
8. "Whiskey Rock-A-Roller" – 3:57
9. "Call Me the Breeze" – 5:36
10. "T for Texas" - 8:11
11. "Sweet Home Alabama" – 5:28
12. "Free Bird" – 12:20

== Personnel ==
Lynyrd Skynyrd

- Ronnie Van Zant – lead vocals
- Allen Collins – guitars
- Gary Rossington – guitars
- Billy Powell – keyboards
- Leon Wilkeson – bass, background vocals
- Artimus Pyle – drums, percussion
