= Owen Hale =

American musician (born 1948)

- Born: Owen Hale; July 15, 1948 (age 78); Lumberton, Mississippi, U.S.
- Genres: Southern rock, country
- Occupation: Musician
- Instrument: Drums
- Years active: 1970s – present
- Formerly of: Lynyrd Skynyrd
- Website: imdb.com/name/nm1595997/

Owen Hale (Born July 15, 1948) is an American musician best known for playing drums with Lynyrd Skynyrd, on their album Twenty and the Lyve from Steel Town DVD concert. Hale left the group in 1998. He was also a busy studio drummer in Nashville, TN appearing on many records by Patty Loveless, Doug Stone and Toby Keith among others.
