= What's Your Name (album) =

Greatest hits album by Lynyrd Skynyrd
- Released: 1987
- Recorded: 1972–1977
- Genre: Boogie rock, Southern rock
- Length: 49:09
- Label: MCA Records

Professional ratings
Review scores
Source	Rating
AllMusic	2/5 stars

What's Your Name is a compilation album by American rock band Lynyrd Skynyrd. It was certified gold and platinum by the RIAA in July 2001.

== Track listing ==
1. "That Smell" (Allen Collins, Ronnie Van Zant) – 5:49
2. "Workin' for MCA" (Ed King, Van Zant) – 4:48
3. "Call Me the Breeze" (J.J. Cale) – 5:09
4. "Mississippi Kid" (Al Kooper, Van Zant, Bob Burns) – 3:57
5. "What's Your Name?" (Gary Rossington, Van Zant) – 3:33
6. "Simple Man" (Rossington, Van Zant) – 5:58
7. "Things Goin' On" (Rossington, Van Zant) – 5:00
8. "I Need You" (King, Rossington, Van Zant) – 6:53
9. "Swamp Music" (King, Van Zant) – 3:33
10. "Sweet Home Alabama" (King, Rossington, Van Zant) – 4:45
- Tracks 1 and 5 from Street Survivors (1977)
- Tracks 2–3 and 8–10 from Second Helping (1974)
- Tracks 4 and 6–7 from (Pronounced 'Lĕh-'nérd 'Skin-'nérd) (1973)

== Certifications ==
Region	Certification	Certified units/sales
United States (RIAA)	Platinum	1,000,000^{^}
^{^} Shipments figures based on certification alone.
