= Solo Flytes =

Greatest hits album by Lynyrd Skynyrd
- Released: 1999
- Recorded: 1975–1983
- Genre: Hard rock, southern rock
- Length: 1:15:53
- Label: MCA Records
- Producer: Allen Collins, Gary Rossington

Professional ratings
Review scores
Source	Rating
AllMusic	3/5 stars

Solo Flytes is a compilation album by members of the American rock group Lynyrd Skynyrd. The album primarily features tracks from various bands the members of Skynyrd had formed after the plane crash that took the lives of numerous members. With the exception of "One In The Sun" by Steve Gaines (recorded 1975), the tracks were all recorded between 1978 and 1983 (Skynyrd reformed soon after).

== Track listing ==
1. "Prime Time" - The Rossington-Collins Band - 4:06
2. "Don't Misunderstand Me" - The Rossington-Collins Band - 3:58
3. "One In The Sun" - Steve Gaines - 4:59
4. "Getaway" - The Rossington-Collins Band - 7:27
5. "Opportunity" - The Rossington-Collins Band - 4:35
6. "Red Hot Light" - Artimus Pyle Band - 3:18
7. "Tashauna" - The Rossington-Collins Band - 4:58
8. "Seems Like Everyday" - The Rossington-Collins Band - 4:31
9. "Next Phone Call" - The Rossington-Collins Band - 3:35
10. "Pine Box" - The Rossington-Collins Band - 3:03
11. "Fancy Ideas" - The Rossington-Collins Band - 4:40
12. "Chapter One" - Allen Collins Band - 4:32
13. "Makes More Rock" - Artimus Pyle Band - 2:40
14. "I'm Free Today" - The Rossington-Collins Band - 3:24
15. "Welcome Me Home" - The Rossington Band - 4:44
16. "Sometimes You Can Put It Out" - The Rossington-Collins Band - 5:42
17. "Don't Misunderstand Me" (live) - The Rossington Band - 5:41
