= Lyve from Steel Town =

Live album by Lynyrd Skynyrd
- Released: June 2, 1998
- Recorded: July 15, 1997
- Venue: Starlake Amphitheater (Pittsburgh)
- Genre: Southern rock
- Length: 109:58
- Label: CMC International
- Producers: Ben Fowler, Lynyrd Skynyrd

Lynyrd Skynyrd chronology
Old Time Greats (1997)	Lyve from Steel Town (1998)	The Essential Lynyrd Skynyrd (1998)

Professional ratings
Review scores
Source	Rating
AllMusic	3/5 stars

Lyve from Steel Town is a live album by the 'post-plane crash' lineup of American rock band Lynyrd Skynyrd. It has two discs; the last two tracks on the second disc are exclusive interviews with the band. The concert was also released as a live VHS and DVD. The tracks were recorded at Star Lake Amphitheatre in Burgettstown, Pennsylvania (outside Pittsburgh), on July 15, 1997. Both the album and the video were certified Gold by the RIAA.

== Track listings ==
=== Disc 1 ===
1. "We Ain't Much Different" (Gary Rossington, Johnny Van Zant, Rickey Medlocke, Hughie Thomasson, Mike Estes) – 4:10
2. "Saturday Night Special" (Ed King, Ronnie Van Zant) – 5:45
3. "What's Your Name?" (Gary Rossington, Ronnie Van Zant) – 3:56
4. "On the Hunt" (Allen Collins, Ronnie Van Zant) – 6:17
5. "You Got That Right" (Steve Gaines, Ronnie Van Zant) – 4:47
6. "Voodoo Lake" (Johnny Van Zant, Chris Eddy, Bob Britt) – 5:11
7. "That Smell" (Allen Collins, Ronnie Van Zant) – 6:17
8. "Bring It On" (Gary Rossington, Johnny Van Zant, Rickey Medlocke, Hughie Thomasson) – 6:04
9. "Simple Man" (Gary Rossington, Ronnie Van Zant) – 7:46
10. "I Know a Little" (Steve Gaines) – 4:57
11. "Berneice" (Gary Rossington, Johnny Van Zant, Rickey Medlocke, Hughie Thomasson, Dennis E. Sumner) – 3:58
12. "Gimme Three Steps" (Allen Collins, Ronnie Van Zant) – 5:52

=== Disc 2 ===
1. "Sweet Home Alabama" (Ed King, Gary Rossington, Ronnie Van Zant) – 6:42
2. "Travelin' Man" (Leon Wilkeson, Ronnie Van Zant) – 4:19
3. "Free Bird" (Allen Collins, Ronnie Van Zant) – 13:40
4. "Lynyrd Skynyrd Interview #1" – 11:05
5. "Lynyrd Skynyrd Interview #2" – 9:12

== Personnel ==
Lynyrd Skynyrd

- Johnny Van Zant – vocals
- Gary Rossington – lead, rhythm and slide guitars
- Leon Wilkeson – bass, vocals
- Hughie Thomasson – lead, rhythm, slide and acoustic guitars; vocals
- Rickey Medlocke – lead, rhythm, slide and acoustic guitars; vocals
- Billy Powell – piano, Hammond B3 organ
- Owen Hale – drums and percussion
- Dale Krantz Rossington – backing vocals
- Carol Chase – backing vocals

== Certifications ==
Region	Certification	Certified units/sales
United States (RIAA)	Gold	500,000^{^}
United States (RIAA) Video	Gold	50,000^{^}
^{^} Shipments figures based on certification alone.
