= Authorized Bootleg: Live in Winterland, San Francisco, CA, 3/07/76 =

Live album by Lynyrd Skynyrd
- Released: March 31, 2009
- Recorded: March 7, 1976
- Genre: Rock, Southern rock, blues-rock
- Length: 66:40
- Label: Geffen Records

Lynyrd Skynyrd chronology
Gimme Back My Bullets (1976)	Authorized Bootleg: Live in Winterland, San Francisco, CA, 3/07/76 (2009)	Street Survivors (1977)

Professional ratings
Review scores
Source	Rating
iTunes	4.5/5 stars

Authorized Bootleg: Live in Winterland, San Francisco, CA, 3/07/76 is a live concert recording of Lynyrd Skynyrd. It was released by Geffen Records alongside Live at the Cardiff Capitol Theatre which captures a concert four months earlier. This recording features the addition of synthesizers and backing Vocals. This concert took place in San Francisco, CA March 7, 1976.

== Track listing ==
1. "Cry for the Bad Man" (Allen Collins, Gary Rossington, Ronnie Van Zant) – 5:41
2. "Saturday Night Special" (Ed King, Van Zant) – 5:35
3. "Searchin'" (Collins, VanZant) – 4:02
4. "I Got the Same Old Blues" (J.J. Cale) – 4:26
5. "Gimmie Back My Bullets" (Rossington, VanZant) – 4:13
6. "Tuesday's Gone" (Collins, VanZant) – 7:52
7. "The Needle and the Spoon" (Collins, VanZant) - 4:47
8. "Gimmie Three Steps/Call Me the Breeze" (Cale, Collins, VanZant) – 10:08
9. "Sweet Home Alabama" (King, Rossington, VanZant) – 7:13
10. "Free Bird" (Collins, VanZant) – 12:47

== Personnel ==
Lynyrd Skynyrd

- Ronnie Van Zant – lead vocals
- Allen Collins – guitars
- Gary Rossington – guitars
- Billy Powell – keyboards
- Leon Wilkeson – bass, background vocals
- Artimus Pyle – drums, percussion
- The Honkettes - Background Vocals
