= Lynyrd Skynyrd 1991 Tour =

1991–92 concert tour by Lynyrd Skynyrd

- Tour by Lynyrd Skynyrd
- Associated album: Lynyrd Skynyrd 1991
- Start date: July 17, 1991
- End date: February 26, 1992
- No. of shows: 64

Lynyrd Skynyrd concert chronology
- Lynyrd Skynyrd Tribute Tour (1987–88); Lynyrd Skynyrd 1991 Tour (1991–92); The Last Rebel Tour (1992–93)

The Lynyrd Skynyrd 1991 Tour was a tour in support of the band's first post-plane crash album Lynyrd Skynyrd 1991. The tour took place in the United States, Canada and Europe.

The first show of the tour, in Baton Rouge, was the first time the band had sung its classic anthem "Free Bird" since the 1977 plane crash, which had occurred as the band flew to a show in Baton Rouge. Ticket holders for that 1977 show were admitted free.

== Typical setlist ==
- "Smokestack Lightning"
- "I Know a Little"
- "Saturday Night Special"
- "You Got That Right"
- "What's Your Name"
- "Keeping the Faith"
- "Good Thing"
- "Don't Ask Me No Questions"
- "Simple Man"
- "The Ballad of Curtis Loew"
- "Southern Women"
- "I've Seen Enough"
- "That Smell"
- "Gimme Three Steps"
- "Call Me the Breeze"
- "Backstreet Crawler"
- "Sweet Home Alabama"
- "Free Bird"

== Tour dates ==
Date	City	Country	Venue
North America leg 1
July 17, 1991	Baton Rouge	United States	Riverside Centroplex
July 19, 1991	Antioch	United States	Starwood Amphitheatre
July 20, 1991	Charlotte	United States	Blockbuster Pavilion
July 21, 1991	Raleigh	United States	Walnut Creek Amphitheater
July 23, 1991	Columbia	United States	Merriweather Post Pavilion
July 26, 1991	Bristol	United States	Lake Compounce
July 29, 1991	New York City	United States	Beacon Theatre
July 30, 1991	Syracuse	United States	New York State Fairgrounds
July 31, 1991	Groton	United States	Thames River Pavilion
August 2, 1991	Vaughan	Canada	Kingswood Music Theatre
August 3, 1991	Darien	United States	Lakeside Amphitheater
August 4, 1991	Saratoga Springs	United States	Saratoga Performing Arts Center
August 6, 1991	Holmdel	United States	Garden State Arts Center
August 8, 1991	Wantagh	United States	Jones Beach Theater
August 9, 1991	Philadelphia	United States	The Spectrum
August 10, 1991	Burgettstown	United States	Star Lake Amphitheater
August 13, 1991	Clarkston	United States	Pine Knob Music Theater
August 14, 1991	Noblesville	United States	Deer Creek Music Center
August 16, 1991	Tinley Park	United States	World Music Theatre
August 17, 1991	East Troy	United States	Alpine Valley Music Theater
August 19, 1991	Cincinnati	United States	Riverbend Music Center
August 23, 1991	Maryland Heights	United States	Riverport Amphitheater
August 24, 1991	Bonner Springs	United States	Sandstone Amphitheater
August 27, 1991	Morrison	United States	Red Rocks Amphitheatre
August 28, 1991	Park City	United States	Park West
August 30, 1991	Irvine	United States	Irvine Meadows Amphitheatre
August 31, 1991	Mountain View	United States	Shoreline Amphitheatre
North America leg 2
September 26, 1991	Antioch	United States	Starwood Amphitheatre
September 27, 1991	Louisville	United States	Louisville Gardens
September 28, 1991	Atlanta	United States	Lakewood Amphitheatre
October 1, 1991	Orlando	United States	Orlando Arena
October 2, 1991	Jacksonville	United States	Jacksonville Memorial Coliseum
October 4, 1991	Miami	United States	Miami Arena
October 5, 1991	Tampa	United States	USF Sun Dome
October 8, 1991	Pelham	United States	Oak Mountain Amphitheatre
October 9, 1991	Biloxi	United States	Mississippi Coast Coliseum
October 10, 1991	Monroe	United States	Monroe Civic Center
October 12, 1991	Houston	United States	Cynthia Woods Mitchell Pavilion
October 13, 1991	Dallas	United States	Starplex Amphitheatre
October 14, 1991	Odessa	United States	Ector County Coliseum
October 18, 1991	Concord	United States	Concord Pavilion
October 19, 1991	Sacramento	United States	Cal Expo Amphitheatre
October 21, 1991	Universal City	United States	Universal Amphitheatre
October 22, 1991	San Diego	United States	Starlight Bowl
October 23, 1991	Phoenix	United States	Arizona Memorial Coliseum
Pacific Rim
November 11, 1991	Tokyo	Japan	Kōsei Nenkin Kaikan
November 12, 1991	Tokyo	Japan	Kōsei Nenkin Kaikan
November 13, 1991	Tokyo	Japan	Kōsei Nenkin Kaikan
November 14, 1991	Osaka	Japan	Sankei Hall
November 15, 1991	Nagoya	Japan	Aichi Kōsei Nenkin Kaikan
November 17, 1991	Honolulu	United States	Neal S. Blaisdell Center
Europe
February 10, 1992	London	England	Town & Country Club
February 11, 1992	London	England	Town & Country Club
February 12, 1992	Paris	France	Élysée Montmartre
February 13, 1992	Paris	France	Élysée Montmartre
February 15, 1992	Hamburg	Germany	Alsterdorfer Sporthalle
February 16, 1992	Hanover	Germany	Hanover Music Hall
February 18, 1992	Frankfurt	Germany	Festhalle Frankfurt
February 19, 1992	Fürth	Germany	Stadthalle Fürth
February 20, 1992	Böblingen	Germany	Sporthalle
February 22, 1992	Augsburg	Germany	Schwabenhalle
February 23, 1992	Düsseldorf	Germany	Philips Halle
February 24, 1992	Berlin	Germany	Eissporthalle an der Jafféstraße
February 25, 1992	Ludwigshafen	Germany	Friedrich-Ebert-Halle

== Personnel ==
- Johnny Van Zant – vocals
- Gary Rossington – guitar
- Ed King – guitar
- Randall Hall – guitar
- Leon Wilkeson – bass
- Billy Powell – keyboard, piano
- Kurt Custer – drums
- Artimus Pyle – drums (left the tour August 2, 1991)
- Dale Krantz-Rossington – backing vocals
- Debbie Bailey – backing vocals
