= Collectybles =

Greatest hits album by Lynyrd Skynyrd
- Released: November 21, 2000
- Recorded: 1968–1977
- Genre: Southern rock
- Length: 75:51 (Disc 1); 74:27 (Disc 2)
- Label: MCA
- Producer: Al Kooper; Tom Dowd; Lynyrd Skynyrd; Tim Smith; Jimmy R. Johnson; Ron O'Brien

Lynyrd Skynyrd chronology
| Christmas Time Again (2000) | Collectybles (2000) | Then and Now (2000) |

Professional ratings
Review scores
| Source | Rating |
|---|---|
| Allmusic | 4/5 stars |

Collectybles is a compilation album by the American Southern rock band Lynyrd Skynyrd, released on November 21, 2000. The two disc set includes early demo recordings, live versions and studio tracks, some previously unreleased.

Tracks 2 & 3 of disc 1, "Need all my Friends" and (b/w) "Michelle" were recorded in 1968 and 1969 respectively (ST101 and ST102) intended as a single under the moniker LYNARD SKYNARD, making these the only 2 recordings ever released under a different band name. There were 300 7-inch vinyl 45 rpm singles pressed, although not released until 1970, a year after the band had already permanently settled on the name Lynyrd Skynyrd.

== Track listing ==
=== Disc one ===
1. "Free Bird" (demo) (Allen Collins, Ronnie Van Zant) – 7:29
2. "Need All My Friends" (originally released on Shade Tree Records, 1968) (Collins, Van Zant) – 3:18
3. "Michelle" (originally released on Shade Tree Records, 1969) (Collins, Van Zant) – 2:57
4. "If I'm Wrong" (Collins, Gary Rossington, Van Zant) – 5:29
5. "No One Can Take Your Place" (Collins, Rossington, Van Zant) – 5:25
6. "Hide Your Face" (Rossington, Van Zant) – 2:59
7. "Bad Boy Blues" (Rossington, Van Zant) – 7:48
8. "Memphis" (Ed King, Rossington, Van Zant) – 3:21
9. "I Ain't the One" (Rossington, Van Zant) – 4:00
10. "Call Me the Breeze" (J.J. Cale) – 5:50
11. "Sweet Home Alabama" (King, Rossington, Van Zant) – 4:55
12. "Woman of Mine" (Van Zant, Leon Wilkeson) – 6:33
13. "Workin' for MCA" (King, Van Zant) – 5:06
14. "Free Bird" (Collins, Van Zant) – 10:35

=== Disc two ===
1. "Need All My Friends" (Complete version) (Collins, Van Zant) – 5:11
2. "Michelle" (Complete version) (Collins, Van Zant) – 5:43
3. "Introduction by Alex Cooley/Saturday Night Special" (King, Van Zant) – 6:50
4. "Whiskey Rock-a-Roller" (King, Billy Powell, Van Zant) – 4:26
5. "Gimme Three Steps" (Collins, Van Zant) – 4:42
6. "Call Me the Breeze" (Cale) – 5:45
7. "I Never Dreamed" (Alternate version) (Steve Gaines, Van Zant) – 4:55
8. "You Got That Right" (Alternate version) (Gaines, Van Zant) – 3:27
9. "T for Texas" (Jimmie Rodgers) – 10:15
10. "Crossroads" (Robert Johnson) – 4:00
11. "Jacksonville Kid" (Merle Haggard, Van Zant) – 4:06
12. "Free Bird" (Collins, Van Zant) – 14:58

Track notes

- Disc 1, Tracks 1–5 taken from 1968 (Tracks 2–3) and 1970 (Tracks 1, 4–5) Shade Tree Recordings, recorded at Norm Vincent Studios, Jacksonville, Florida. "Need All My Friends" and "Michelle" were recorded in 1968 and issued as Shade Tree singles under the name Lynard Skynard. They were not previously released on album. Many unreleased tracks were either attributed early incarnations of the band, such as My Backyard, The Noble Five, and One Percent.
- Disc 1, Tracks 6–7 and Disc 2, Tracks 1–2 taken from October 1970 Quinvy Recordings, recorded at Quinvy Studios, Sheffield, Alabama.
- Disc 1, Track 8 taken from January 1974 Second Helping outtake, recorded at Record Plant, Los Angeles, California.
- Disc 1, Tracks 9–14 taken from October 30, 1973 Live at WMC-FM, recorded at Ardent Studios, Memphis, Tennessee.
- Disc 2, Tracks 3–6, 9–10 and 12 recorded live at Fox Theater, Atlanta, Georgia on July 7 (Tracks 3, 5, 6, 9), July 8 (Track 10) and July 9 (Tracks 4, 12), 1976 (the One More from the Road sessions).
- Disc 2, Tracks 7–8 taken from April 1977 Street Survivors outtake, recorded at Criteria Studios, Miami, Florida.
- Disc 2, Track 11 taken from August 1977 Street Survivors outtake, recorded at Studio One, Doraville, Georgia.

== Credits ==
- Mike Zagaris - cover photo
