= Endangered Species (Lynyrd Skynyrd album) =

Studio album by Lynyrd Skynyrd
- Released: August 9, 1994
- Recorded: Spring - Summer 1994
- Studios: Masterfonics Studios, Nashville, Tennessee
- Genre: Southern rock
- Length: 43:10
- Label: Capricorn
- Producer: Barry Beckett

Lynyrd Skynyrd chronology
The Last Rebel (1993)	Endangered Species (1994)	Twenty (1997)

Professional ratings
Review scores
Source	Rating
AllMusic	4/5 stars

Endangered Species is the eighth album by American Southern rock band Lynyrd Skynyrd. It was released in 1994 and features mostly acoustic instrumentation, as well as Ronnie Van Zant's younger brother, Johnny, as lead vocalist. Many of the songs are Lynyrd Skynyrd's best known songs, with new material released alongside. This is the last album to feature guitarist Ed King and the only one to feature guitarist Mike Estes.

== Track listing ==
1. "Down South Jukin'" (Gary Rossington, Ronnie Van Zant) – 2:38
2. "Heartbreak Hotel" (Mae Boren Axton, Tommy Durden, Elvis Presley) – 4:01
3. "Devil in the Bottle" (Mike Estes, Dale Krantz-Rossington, Rossington, Johnny Van Zant) – 3:35
4. "Things Goin' On" (Rossington, R. Van Zant) – 3:00
5. "Saturday Night Special" (Ed King, R. Van Zant) – 3:53
6. "Sweet Home Alabama" (King, Rossington, R. Van Zant) – 4:01
7. "I Ain't the One" (Rossington, R. Van Zant) – 3:27
8. "Am I Losin'" (Rossington, R. Van Zant) – 4:06
9. "All I Have Is a Song" (Rossington, J. Van Zant) – 3:21
10. "Poison Whiskey" (King, R. Van Zant) – 2:47
11. "Good Luck, Bad Luck" (Estes, King) – 3:23
12. "The Last Rebel" (Michael Lunn, Rossington, J. Van Zant, Robert White Johnson) – 5:42
13. "Hillbilly Blues" (Estes, King, Rossington, J. Van Zant) – 3:42

== Personnel ==
Lynyrd Skynyrd

- Gary Rossington – guitar, acoustic guitar
- Leon Wilkeson – bass, background vocals
- Billy Powell – piano
- Ed King – guitar, mandolin, acoustic guitar
- Johnny Van Zant – vocals
- Mike Estes – guitar, acoustic guitar
- Owen Hale – percussion, drums
- Dale Krantz-Rossington – background vocals, vocals
- Debbie Davis – background vocals

== Charts ==
Chart (1994)	Peak position
Finnish Albums (The Official Finnish Charts)	11
US Billboard 200	115
