= Need All My Friends =

Single by Lynyrd Skynyrd
- B-side: "Michelle"
- Released: 1969
- Recorded: May 1969
- Studio: Norm Vincent Studios
- Genre: Southern rock
- Length: 5:13
- Label: Shade Tree
- Songwriters: Ronnie Van Zant; Allen Collins
- Producers: Tom Markham; Jim Sutton

Lynyrd Skynyrd singles chronology
"Need All My Friends" (1969)	"Gimme Three Steps" (1974)

"Need All My Friends" is a song written and performed by southern rock band Lynyrd Skynyrd. The song was recorded in May 1969 and released the same year by Shade Tree Records. The song is considered to be the first song the band recorded, with their name spelled as "Lynard Skynard" on the release. The song was never released on a studio album until 2000 when MCA records released the double CD compilation of rarities called Collectybles. According to the Goldmine Price Guide to 45 RPM Records, "approximately 300 copies [were] pressed". Another version (also included on Collectybles) was recorded in 1970 at Quinvy Studios as part of the "Quinvy Demo" that the band cut before heading to Muscle Shoals Sound Studios to record with Jimmie Johnston.

== Background ==
In May 1969, David Griffin, the manager of a small town music store, Marvin Kay’s Music Center, arranged with a local record company, Shade Tree Records, to finance a session for the band at a studio owned by Norm Vincent. Producers Tom Markham and Jim Sutton controlled Shade Tree. Van Zant and Collins co-wrote two songs that were produced in mono on an eight-track recorder in about an hour. Van Zant had written the first song "Michelle" about his daughter. It was produced as a "sassy blues riff" with Van Zant trying hard to sound like Gregg Allman. The other cut, "Need All My Friends" was an augury of "Free Bird". Markham and Suttion, thinking they might be onto something, decided to go ahead and press three hundred copies of the two-sided 45-rpm by "Lynyard Skynard" and flooded radio stations with the record.

== Personnel ==
- Ronnie Van Zant – vocals
- Gary Rossington – guitar
- Allen Collins – guitar
- Larry Junstrom – bass
- Bob Burns– drums
