= Red White & Blue (Lynyrd Skynyrd song) =

Single by Lynyrd Skynyrd

from the album Vicious Cycle
- Released: April 16, 2003
- Recorded: Cartee Day Studios, Nashville, Tennessee
- Genre: Southern rock
- Length: 5:31
- Label: Sanctuary
- Songwriter(s): Johnny Van Zant, Donnie Van Zant, Brett Warren, and Brad Warren
- Producer(s): Ben Fowler and Lynyrd Skynyrd

Lynyrd Skynyrd singles chronology
"Preacher Man" (1999)	"Red White & Blue" (2003)	"Still Unbroken" (2009)

"Red White and Blue" is a song by American Southern rock band Lynyrd Skynyrd, released on their 2003 album Vicious Cycle. It reached number 27 on the Billboard Mainstream Rock chart. It was written shortly after the September 11 attacks.

== Chart performance ==
Chart (2003)	Peak position
US Mainstream Rock (Billboard)	27
