= Twenty (Lynyrd Skynyrd album) =

Studio album by Lynyrd Skynyrd
- Released: April 29, 1997
- Recorded: 1997
- Studios: Muscle Shoals Sound Studios, Muscle Shoals, Alabama
- Genre: Southern rock
- Length: 55:39
- Label: CMC International
- Producer: Josh Leo

Lynyrd Skynyrd chronology
Endangered Species (1994)	Twenty (1997)	What's Your Name (1997)

Professional ratings
Review scores
Source	Rating
AllMusic	2/5 stars

Twenty is the ninth studio album by American rock band Lynyrd Skynyrd, released in 1997. The title of the album refers to the fact that it had been twenty years since the plane crash which killed original lead singer Ronnie Van Zant, guitarist Steve Gaines, and backup singer Cassie Gaines.

For this album, the band brought in two Southern rock veterans: Rickey Medlocke, who had been a drummer for the band briefly before forming Blackfoot, and Hughie Thomasson of the Outlaws. A studio version of the song "Travelin' Man" was recorded, originally from the band's 1976 live album One More from the Road. Making use of modern technology, the band was able to use Ronnie Van Zant's vocal track throughout the song, creating a duet between Johnny and Ronnie.

The album cover is a drawing of Monument Valley in the Navajo Nation reservation.

== Track listing ==
1. "We Ain't Much Different" (Mike Estes, Rickey Medlocke, Gary Rossington, Hughie Thomasson, Johnny Van Zant) – 3:44
2. "Bring It On" (Medlocke, Rossington, Thomasson, J. Van Zant) – 4:56
3. "Voodoo Lake" (Bob Britt, Chris Eddy, J. Van Zant) – 4:37
4. "Home Is Where the Heart Is" (Medlocke, Rossington, Thomasson, J. Van Zant) – 5:26
5. "Travelin' Man" (Ronnie Van Zant, Leon Wilkeson) – 4:05
6. "Talked Myself Right Into It" (Pat Buchanan, Donnie Van Zant, J. Van Zant, Robert White Johnson) – 3:25
7. "Never Too Late" (Medlocke, Rossington, Thomasson, J. Van Zant) – 5:18
8. "O.R.R." (Medlocke, Rossington, Thomasson, J. Van Zant) – 4:16
9. "Blame It on a Sad Song" (Medlocke, Rossington, Thomasson, J. Van Zant) – 5:35
10. "Berneice" (Medlocke, Rossington, Dennis E. Sumner, Thomasson, J. Van Zant) – 4:01
11. "None of Us Are Free" (Barry Mann, Brenda Russell, Cynthia Weil) – 5:23
12. "How Soon We Forget" (Buchanan, D. Van Zant, J. Van Zant, White Johnson) – 4:50
13. "Sign of the Times" (Japan bonus track) – 3:44

== Personnel ==
Lynyrd Skynyrd

- Gary Rossington – lead, rhythm, slide and acoustic guitars
- Johnny Van Zant – lead vocals, harmonica
- Leon Wilkeson – bass
- Ricky Medlocke – lead, rhythm, slide, acoustic and Dobro guitars; background vocals; harmonica
- Hughie Thomasson – lead, rhythm, slide and acoustic guitars; background vocals
- Billy Powell – piano and Hammond B-3 organ
- Owen Hale – drums and percussion
- Dale Krantz-Rossington – background vocals
- Carol Chase – background vocals
- Ronnie Van Zant – vocals on "Travelin' Man"

== Charts ==
Chart (1997)	Peak position
Finnish Albums (Suomen virallinen lista)	12
German Albums (Offizielle Top 100)	70
Norwegian Albums (VG-lista)	36
US Billboard 200	97
