= The Last Rebel =

Studio album by Lynyrd Skynyrd
- Released: February 16, 1993
- Recorded: September 1992 – January 1993
- Studios: Emerald Sound Studios, Nashville, Tennessee
- Genre: Southern rock
- Length: 50:01
- Labels: Atlantic Recording Corporation for U.S., WEA International for other countries
- Producers: Barry Beckett; Reissue producer: Joe Reagoso

Lynyrd Skynyrd chronology
Lynyrd Skynyrd (Box Set) (1991)	The Last Rebel (1993)	Endangered Species (1994)

Professional ratings
Review scores
Source	Rating
AllMusic	2/5 stars
Rolling Stone	4/5 stars

The Last Rebel is the seventh studio album by American rock band Lynyrd Skynyrd, released in 1993. It is the last album to feature drummer Kurt Custer and guitarist Randall Hall.

== Track listing ==
1. "Good Lovin's Hard to Find" (Ed King, Gary Rossington, Johnny Van Zant, Robert White Johnson) – 3:55
2. "One Thing" (Kurt Custer, King, Dale Krantz-Rossington, Rossington, J. Van Zant) – 5:13
3. "Can't Take That Away" (Michael Lunn, J. Van Zant, Robert White Johnson) – 4:19
4. "Best Things in Life" (Tom Keifer, Rossington, J. Van Zant) – 3:54
5. "The Last Rebel" (Lunn, Rossington, J. Van Zant, White Johnson) – 6:47
6. "Outta Hell in My Dodge" (Randall Hall, King, J. Van Zant, White Johnson) – 3:47
7. "Kiss Your Freedom Goodbye" (King, J. Van Zant) – 4:46
8. "South of Heaven" (Lunn, Rossington, J. Van Zant, White Johnson) – 5:15
9. "Love Don't Always Come Easy" (King, J. Van Zant) – 4:34
10. "Born to Run" (King, Rossington, Donnie Van Zant, J. Van Zant) – 7:25

== Personnel ==
Lynyrd Skynyrd

- Gary Rossington – guitar
- Ed King – guitar
- Johnny Van Zant – lead vocals
- Leon Wilkeson – bass
- Billy Powell – piano, Hammond organ, synthesizer
- Randall Hall – guitar
- Kurt Custer – drums, percussion
- Dale Krantz Rossington – background vocals

Additional personnel

- Tim Lindsey – additional bass

== Charts ==
Chart (1993)	Peak position
Finnish Albums (The Official Finnish Charts)	6
German Albums (Offizielle Top 100)	80
Swedish Albums (Sverigetopplistan)	33
Swiss Albums (Schweizer Hitparade)	18
US Billboard 200	64
