= Edge of Forever =

Studio album by Lynyrd Skynyrd
- Released: August 10, 1999
- Recorded: 1999
- Genre: Southern rock, hard rock
- Length: 59:29
- Label: CMC International
- Producer: Ron Nevison

Lynyrd Skynyrd chronology
20th Century Masters – The Millennium Collection: The Best of Lynyrd Skynyrd (1999)	Edge of Forever (1999)	All Time Greatest Hits (2000)

Professional ratings
Review scores
Source	Rating
AllMusic	2.5/5 stars

Edge of Forever is the tenth studio album by Southern rock band Lynyrd Skynyrd. Released in 1999, it is the last album to feature bassist Leon Wilkeson before his death in 2001.

== Track listing ==
All tracks are written by Rickey Medlocke, Gary Rossington, Hughie Thomasson, and Johnny Van Zant; except where noted.

No.	Title	Length
1.	"Workin"	4:53
2.	"Full Moon Night"	3:44
3.	"Preacher Man"	4:33
4.	"Mean Streets"	4:49
5.	"Tomorrow's Goodbye" (Gary Burr, Medlocke, Rossington, Thomasson, J. Van Zant)	5:05
6.	"Edge of Forever" (Medlocke, Jim Peterik, J. Van Zant)	4:23
7.	"Gone Fishin'"	4:22
8.	"Through It All" (Peterik, J. Van Zant, Robert White Johnson)	5:28
9.	"Money Back Guarantee"	4:01
10.	"G.W.T.G.G."	4:03
11.	"Rough Around the Edges"	5:05
12.	"FLA"	3:53
Total length:		59:29

== Personnel ==
Lynyrd Skynyrd

- Gary Rossington - lead, rhythm, slide and acoustic guitars
- Billy Powell - piano, keyboards
- Leon Wilkeson - bass
- Rickey Medlocke - lead, rhythm, slide and acoustic guitars, vocals, harmonica
- Hughie Thomasson - lead, rhythm, slide and acoustic guitars, vocals
- Kenny Aronoff - drums
- Johnny Van Zant - lead vocals, harmonica
- Dale Krantz-Rossington - backing vocals
- Carol Chase - backing vocals

Additional personnel

- Michael Cartellone - percussion

== Charts ==
Chart (1999)	Peak position
Finnish Albums (Suomen virallinen lista)	19
German Albums (Offizielle Top 100)	47
UK Rock & Metal Albums (OCC)	39
US Billboard 200	96
