= Tuesday's Gone =

1973 song by Lynyrd Skynyrd

Song by Lynyrd Skynyrd

from the album (Pronounced 'Lĕh-'nérd 'Skin-'nérd)
- Released: 1973
- Recorded: Studio One, Doraville, Georgia, April 1973
- Genre: Southern rock; country-soul
- Length: 7:32
- Label: MCA Records
- Songwriters: Allen Collins; Ronnie Van Zant
- Producer: Al Kooper

"Tuesday's Gone" is the second track on Lynyrd Skynyrd's debut album, (Pronounced 'Lĕh-'nérd 'Skin-'nérd). It also appears on the band's first live LP, One More from the Road.

== History ==
"Tuesday's Gone" was written by guitarist Allen Collins and vocalist Ronnie Van Zant. Producer Al Kooper (credited as "Roosevelt Gook") played bass, sang backup vocals, and added orchestral strings with a Mellotron. Robert Nix of the Atlanta Rhythm Section played drums. Gary Rossington played lead guitar, Ed King added guitar fills and Billy Powell played the piano.

In Counting Down Southern Rock: The 100 Best Songs, author C. Eric Banister regards the lyric of "Tuesday's Gone" as Van Zant's masterpiece.

== Certifications ==
Region	Certification	Certified units/sales
New Zealand (RMNZ)	Platinum	30,000^{‡}
^{‡} Sales+streaming figures based on certification alone.
