= That Smell =

1977 song by Lynyrd Skynyrd

Song by Lynyrd Skynyrd

from the album Street Survivors
- Released: October 17, 1977
- Recorded: July–August 1977
- Studio: Studio One, Doraville, Georgia
- Genre: Southern rock, hard rock
- Length: 5:47
- Label: MCA
- Songwriters: Allen Collins; Ronnie Van Zant; JoJo Billingsley (uncredited)
- Producer: Tom Dowd

"That Smell" is a song by American Southern rock band Lynyrd Skynyrd, written by two band members, vocalist Ronnie Van Zant and guitarist Allen Collins. JoJo Billingsley also allegedly took part in the writing; however, she was never credited. It was said Ronnie claimed he wanted to fix it. Gene Odom, roadie and childhood friend of Ronnie Van Zant confirmed JoJo as a co-writer. The song was released in 1977 on the album Street Survivors. At the time the song was written, the band had been using alcohol, marijuana, cocaine, heroin, amphetamines, and Quaaludes. Van Zant said that he started using heroin and cocaine to relieve the pressure of performing in front of large audiences.

Van Zant's inspiration for the song was the increasing reckless indulgences of the band members culminating in the evening when guitarist Gary Rossington crashed his Ford Torino into an oak tree along Mandarin Road in Jacksonville, Florida, after excessive consumption of alcohol and other drugs. Van Zant was thus inspired to write the song as a warning about the consequences of careless overuse of drugs. The song earned Rossington the moniker "Prince Charming" from Van Zant. Later when asked, Van Zant said, "I had a creepy feeling things were going against us, so I thought I'd write a morbid song." The lyrics cautioned that "tomorrow might not be here for you", and that "the smell of death surrounds you". Three days after the album was released, the band was devastated by a plane crash in which several members were killed, including Van Zant.

The song is featured in the films Blow (2001), Joe Dirt (2001) and Wild Hogs (2007); it is also used at the end of the fourth episode of the HBO television drama series True Blood (2008). The song appeared in the first season of Entourage. It also appeared in the twenty-first episode of the second season of Miami Vice (1984), and the Universal Studios Florida attraction Disaster!.
