= Lynyrd Skynyrd =

American Southern rock band

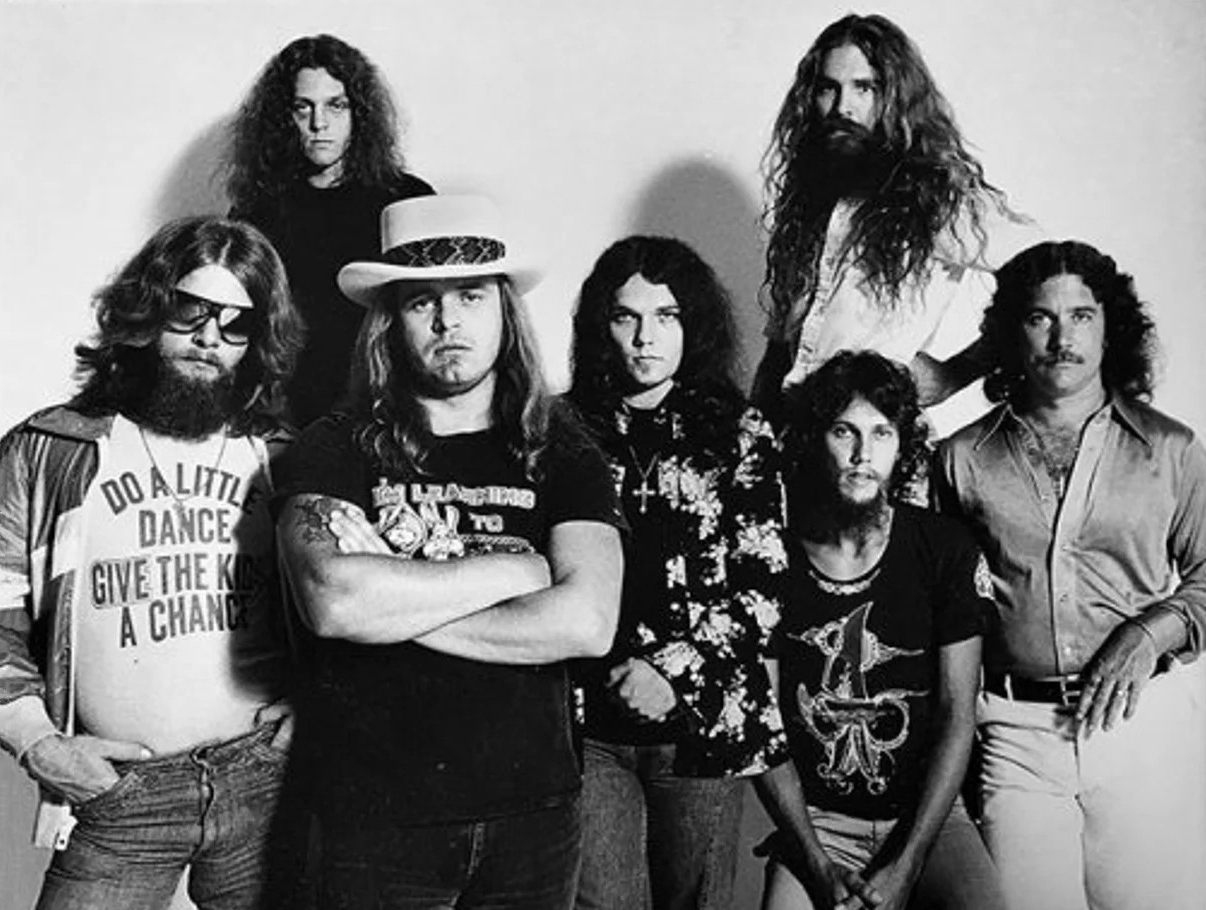
- Lynyrd Skynyrd in 1977. From left to right: Leon Wilkeson, Allen Collins, Ronnie Van Zant, Gary Rossington, Artimus Pyle, Steve Gaines, and Billy Powell.

Background information
- Origin: Jacksonville, Florida, U.S.
- Genres: Southern rock; blues rock; country rock; hard rock
- Works: Discography
- Years active: 1964–1977; 1979; 1987–present
- Labels: MCA; Atlantic; Capricorn; CMC International; Sanctuary; Universal; Roadrunner/Loud & Proud; Frontiers Music
- Spinoffs: Alias; Allen Collins Band; Artimus Pyle Band; Rossington; The Rossington Band; Rossington Collins Band; Vision
- Members: Johnny Van Zant; Rickey Medlocke; Michael Cartellone; Mark Matejka; Peter Keys; Damon Johnson; Robbie Harrington; Carol Chase; Stacey Michelle
- Past members: See band members section and members list article
- Website: lynyrdskynyrd.com

Lynyrd Skynyrd (/lɛnərd skɪnərd/ LEH-nerd SKIN-nerd) is an American rock band formed in Jacksonville, Florida, in 1964. The group originally formed as My Backyard and comprised Ronnie Van Zant (vocals), Gary Rossington (guitar), Allen Collins (guitar), Larry Junstrom (bass), and Bob Burns (drums). The band spent four years touring small venues under various names and with several lineup changes before deciding on "Lynyrd Skynyrd" in 1968, and released its first album, (Pronounced 'Lĕh-'nérd 'Skin-'nérd), in 1973. By then it had settled on a lineup that included bassist Leon Wilkeson, keyboardist Billy Powell, and guitarist Ed King. Burns left and was replaced by Artimus Pyle in 1974. King left in 1975 and was replaced by Steve Gaines in 1976. At the height of the group's fame in the 1970s, it popularized the Southern rock genre with songs such as "Sweet Home Alabama" and "Free Bird". After releasing five studio albums and one live album, the band's career was abruptly halted on October 20, 1977, when its chartered airplane crashed, killing Ronnie Van Zant, Steve Gaines, and backup singer Cassie Gaines, and seriously injuring the rest of the band.

Lynyrd Skynyrd reformed in 1987 for a reunion tour with Ronnie's brother, Johnny Van Zant, as lead vocalist. The band continued to tour and record with Johnny Van Zant and Rickey Medlocke, who first wrote and recorded with the band from 1971 to 1972 before his return in 1996. Over the years, other founding members of the band have died either during or after their time in the group. In January 2018, Lynyrd Skynyrd announced what was intended to be its farewell tour, though it has continued to tour since then. Members were still working on the band's fifteenth album at the time of Rossington's death in 2023, after which no founding members remained in the band.

In 2004, Rolling Stone magazine ranked Lynyrd Skynyrd No. 95 on its list of the "100 Greatest Artists of All Time". Lynyrd Skynyrd was inducted into the Rock and Roll Hall of Fame on March 13, 2006. As of 2023, the band had sold more than 78 million records worldwide. AllMusic called it "the definitive Southern rock band".

== History ==
=== Early years (1963–1973) ===
Allen Collins received his first guitar in 1963 and was later in a band called the Mods in Jacksonville, Florida. The Mods' membership included J.R. Rice and Larry Steele. In early 1964, Ronnie Van Zant joined another local band, The Squires, which he soon renamed to Us. That year, at a local 'Battle of the Bands', Us performed against The Mods and won the competition. Van Zant, however, left Us shortly afterward. In the early summer of 1964, bassist Larry Junstrom, drummer Bob Burns, and guitarist Gary Rossington formed a trio called Me, You, and Him. (Note: Rossington was the last to join—which he did at Burns's request.)

Later in the summer of 1964, teenagers Van Zant, Rossington, and Burns all became acquainted while playing on rival baseball teams. The trio decided to jam together one afternoon after Burns was injured by a ball hit by Van Zant. They set up their equipment in the carport of Burns's parents' house and played the Rolling Stones' hit "Time Is on My Side". Liking what they heard, they immediately decided to form a band. Bassist Larry Junstrom rounded out the lineup. They soon approached guitarist Allen Collins to join the band, and he agreed to join just two weeks later. (Note: Collins initially fled on his bicycle and hid in a tree at the sight of Van Zant pulling into his driveway. Collins was soon convinced that Van Zant meant him no harm.) The band later rehearsed in Junstrom's carport after Burns's parents said the band was too loud. The band settled on the name My Backyard, later changed to Conquer the Worm for a day or two, then The Noble Five, and finally The One Percent by 1967.

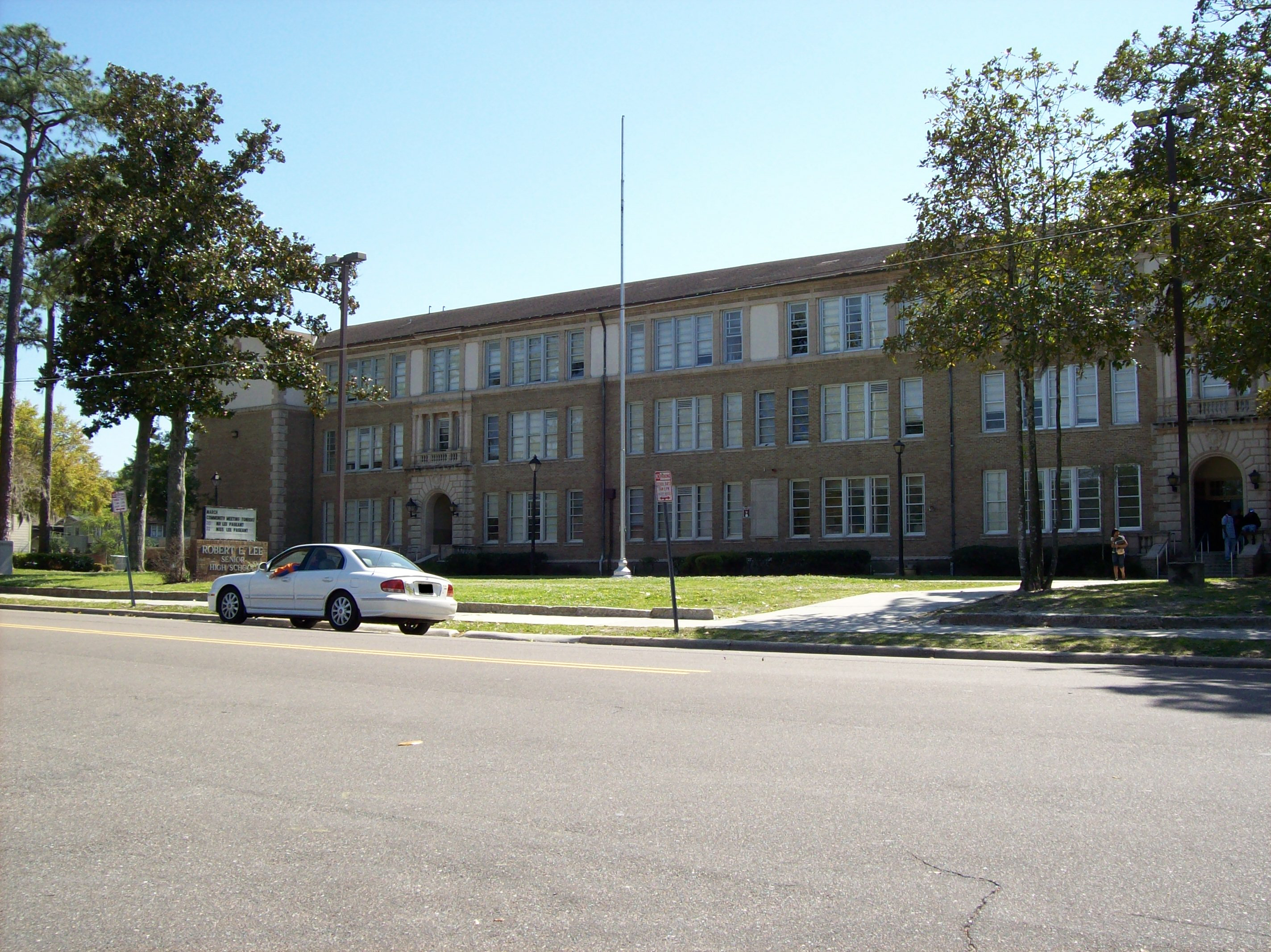
Leonard Skinner was a physical education instructor at Robert E. Lee High School (pictured) in Jacksonville, Florida, known for his strict enforcement of the school's regulations on male hair length.

In 1968, Van Zant sought a new name after growing tired of taunts from audiences that the band had "one percent talent". At Burns's suggestion, the group settled on Leonard Skinnerd, which was in part a reference to a character named "Leonard Skinner" in Allan Sherman's novelty song "Hello Muddah, Hello Fadduh" and in part a mocking tribute to P.E. teacher Leonard Skinner at Robert E. Lee High School. Skinner was notorious for strictly enforcing the school's policy against boys having long hair. Rossington dropped out of school, tired of being hassled about his hair. The more distinctive spelling "Lynyrd Skynyrd" was adopted at least as early as 1969. (Note: Despite their high school acrimony, the band developed a friendlier relationship with Skinner in later years, and invited him to introduce them at a concert in the Jacksonville Memorial Coliseum. Skinner also allowed the band to use a photo of his Leonard Skinner Realty sign for the inside of their third album.)

By 1970, Lynyrd Skynyrd had become a top band in Jacksonville, headlining at some local concerts, and opening for several national acts. Pat Armstrong, a Jacksonville native and partner in Macon, Georgia-based Hustlers Inc.; along with Phil Walden's younger brother, Alan, became the band's managers. Armstrong left Hustlers shortly thereafter to start his own agency. Walden stayed with the band until 1974, when management was transferred to Peter Rudge. The band continued to perform throughout the South in the early 1970s, further developing their hard-driving blues rock sound and image, and experimenting with recording their sound in a studio. Skynyrd crafted this distinctively "southern" sound through a creative blend of country, blues, and a slight British rock influence.

During this time, the band experienced some lineup changes for the first time. Junstrom left and was briefly replaced by Greg T. Walker on bass. At that time, Rickey Medlocke joined as a second drummer and second vocalist to help fortify Burns's sound on the drums. Medlocke had grown up with the founding members of Lynyrd Skynyrd, and his grandfather, Shorty Medlocke, was an influence in the writing of "The Ballad of Curtis Loew". (Note: Some versions of the band's history state Burns briefly left the band during this time, although other versions state that Burns played with the band continuously through 1974.)

=== Peak (1973–1977) ===
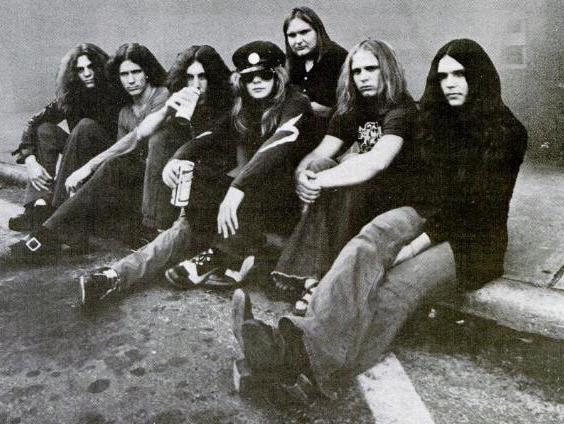
Lynyrd Skynyrd, 1973

In 1972, the band (then comprising Van Zant, Collins, Rossington, Burns, Wilkeson, and Powell) was discovered by musician, songwriter, and producer Al Kooper of Blood, Sweat & Tears, who had attended one of their shows at Funocchio's in Atlanta. Kooper signed them to his Sounds of the South label, which was to be distributed and supported by MCA Records, and produced their first album. Wilkeson, citing nervousness about fame, temporarily left the band during the early recording sessions, playing on only two tracks. He rejoined the band shortly after the album's release at Van Zant's invitation and is pictured on the album cover. To replace him, Strawberry Alarm Clock guitarist Ed King joined the band and played bass on the album (the only part that Wilkeson had not already written being the solo section in "Simple Man"), and also contributed to the songwriting and did some guitar work on the album. After Wilkeson rejoined, King stayed in the band and switched solely to guitar, allowing the band to replicate its three-guitar studio mix in live performances. The band released their debut album (Pronounced 'Lĕh-'nérd 'Skin-'nérd) on August 13, 1973. It sold over one million copies and was awarded a gold disc by the RIAA. The album featured the hit song "Free Bird", which received national airplay, eventually reaching No. 19 on the Billboard Hot 100 chart.

Lynyrd Skynyrd's fan base continued to grow rapidly in 1973, thanks to their opening on the Who's Quadrophenia tour in the United States. Their 1974 follow-up album, Second Helping, featuring King, Collins and Rossington all collaborating with Van Zant on the songwriting, cemented the band's breakthrough. Its single "Sweet Home Alabama", a response to Neil Young's "Southern Man", reached No. 8 on the Billboard Hot 100 that August. Young and Van Zant were not rivals, but fans of each other's music and good friends; Young wrote the song "Powderfinger" for the band, but they never recorded it. During their peak years, most of their records sold over one million copies, but "Sweet Home Alabama" was the only single to crack the top ten.

By 1975, personal issues began to take their toll on the band. In January, drummer Burns left the band after suffering a mental breakdown during a European tour, and was replaced by Kentucky native and former US Marine mechanic Artimus Pyle. The band's third album, Nuthin' Fancy, was recorded in 17 days. Unhappy with the band's lack of preparation for the album's recording, Kooper and the band parted ways by mutual agreement after the tracking was completed, with Kooper mixing the album while the band left for the tour that had precipitated the constricted recording schedule. Though the album fared well, it ultimately had lower sales than its predecessors. Midway through the Nuthin' Fancy tour, guitarist Ed King abruptly left the band after a falling out with Van Zant. King's guitar roadie and Van Zant were arrested together and spent the night in jail. With his guitar roadie unavailable, King played that night's show with old strings that broke, causing his performance to be substandard. Van Zant subsequently belittled him in front of his bandmates. King quit and returned home to Los Angeles, believing Van Zant had been responsible for his guitar roadie being in jail in the first place.

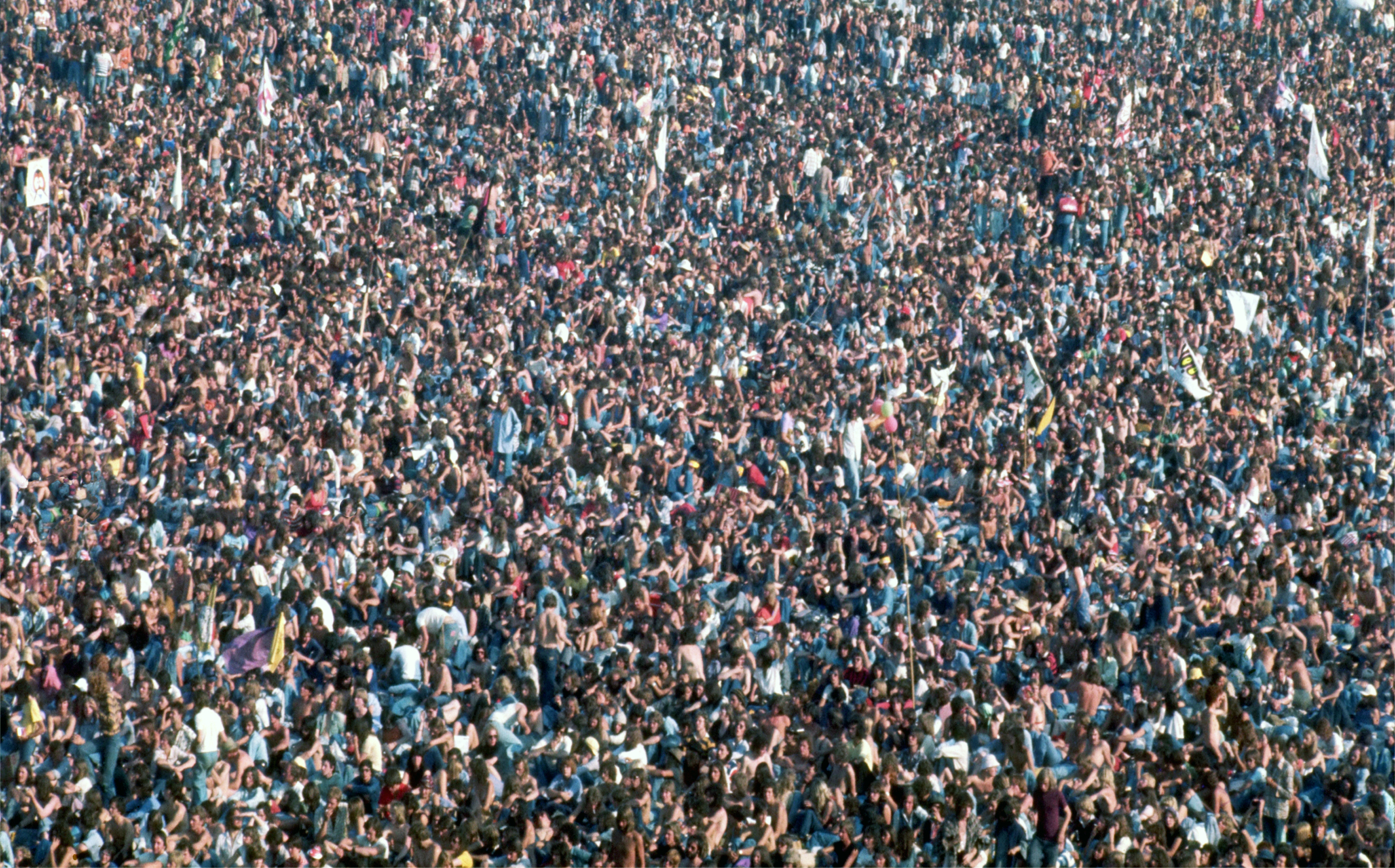
A crowd of 120,000 fans at Knebworth House in 1976

Collins and Rossington both had serious car accidents over Labor Day weekend in 1976, which slowed the recording of the follow-up album and forced the band to cancel some concert dates. Rossington's accident inspired the ominous Van Zant/Collins composition "That Smell", a cautionary tale about drug abuse that was aimed towards him and at least one other band member. Rossington has admitted repeatedly that he was the "Prince Charming" of the song who crashed his car into an oak tree while drunk and stoned on Quaaludes. With the birth of his daughter Melody in 1976, Van Zant was making a serious attempt to clean up his act and curtail the cycle of boozed-up brawling that was part of Skynyrd's reputation.

The Street Survivors album of 1977 turned out to be a showcase for guitarist/vocalist Steve Gaines, who had joined the band just a year earlier and was making his studio debut with it. Publicly and privately, Ronnie Van Zant marveled at the multiple talents of Skynyrd's newest member, claiming that the band would "all be in his shadow one day". Gaines's contributions included his co-lead vocal with Van Zant on the co-written "You Got That Right" and the rousing guitar boogie "I Know a Little", which he had written before he joined Skynyrd. So confident was Skynyrd's leader of Gaines's abilities that the album (and some concerts) featured Gaines delivering his self-penned bluesy "Ain't No Good Life", the only song in the pre-crash Skynyrd catalog to feature a lead vocalist other than Ronnie Van Zant (the album Skynyrd's First: The Complete Muscle Shoals Album, which features two songs sung by former drummer/future guitarist Rickey Medlocke, was released after the plane crash). The album also included the hit singles "What's Your Name" and "That Smell". The band was poised for their biggest tour yet, with shows always highlighted by the iconic rock anthem "Free Bird".

=== Plane crash (1977) ===
Following a performance at the Greenville Memorial Auditorium in Greenville, South Carolina, on October 20, 1977, the band boarded a chartered Convair CV-240 bound for Baton Rouge, Louisiana, where they were scheduled to appear at Louisiana State University the following night. After running out of fuel, the pilots attempted an emergency landing before crashing in a heavily forested area five miles northeast of Gillsburg, Mississippi. Killed on impact were Ronnie Van Zant and Steve Gaines, along with backup singer Cassie Gaines (Steve's older sister), assistant road manager Dean Kilpatrick, pilot Walter McCreary and co-pilot John Gray. Other band members (Collins, Rossington, Wilkeson, Powell, Pyle, and Hawkins), tour manager Ron Eckerman, and several road crew members suffered serious injuries.

The accident came just three days after the release of the group's fifth studio album Street Survivors. Following the crash and the ensuing press, Street Survivors became the band's second platinum album and reached No. 5 on the Billboard 200, their highest position on the chart. The single "What's Your Name" reached No. 13 on the singles charts in 1978. The original cover sleeve for Street Survivors had featured a photograph of the band amid flames, with Steve Gaines nearly obscured by fire. Out of respect for the deceased (and at the request of Teresa Gaines, Steve's widow), MCA Records withdrew the original cover and replaced it with the album's back photo, a similar image of the band against a simple black background. However, the group would restore the original image for the 30th anniversary deluxe edition of the album.

=== Hiatus (1977–1987) ===
Lynyrd Skynyrd disbanded after the tragedy, reuniting only on one occasion to perform an instrumental version of "Free Bird" at Charlie Daniels' Volunteer Jam V in January 1979. Collins, Rossington, Powell, and Pyle were joined by Daniels and members of his band. Leon Wilkeson, who was still undergoing physical therapy for his badly broken left arm, was in attendance, along with Judy Van Zant, Teresa Gaines, JoJo Billingsley, and Leslie Hawkins.

Rossington, Collins, Wilkeson and Powell formed the Rossington Collins Band, which released two MCA albums, Anytime, Anyplace, Anywhere in 1980 and This Is The Way in 1981. Deliberately avoiding comparisons with Ronnie Van Zant as well as suggestions that this band was Lynyrd Skynyrd reborn, Rossington and Collins chose a woman, Dale Krantz, as the lead vocalist. However, as an acknowledgement of their past, the band's concert encore would always be an instrumental version of "Free Bird". Rossington and Collins eventually had a falling out over the affections of Dale Krantz, whom Rossington married and with whom he formed the Rossington Band, which released two albums, Returned to the Scene of the Crime in 1986 and Love Your Man in 1988 and also opened for the Lynyrd Skynyrd Tribute Tour in 1987–1988.

The other former members of Lynyrd Skynyrd continued to make music during the hiatus era. Billy Powell played keyboards in a Christian rock band named Vision, touring with established Christian rocker Mylon LeFevre. During Vision concerts, Powell's trademark keyboard talent was often spotlighted and he spoke about his conversion to Christianity after the near-fatal plane crash. Pyle formed the Artimus Pyle Band in 1982, which occasionally featured former Honkettes JoJo Billingsley and Leslie Hawkins and released one MCA album, titled A.P.B.

In 1980, Allen Collins's wife, Kathy, died of a massive hemorrhage while miscarrying their third child. He formed the Allen Collins Band in 1983 from the remnants of the Rossington Collins Band and released one MCA studio album, Here, There & Back. He was visibly suffering from Kathy's death; he excessively drank and consumed drugs. On January 29, 1986, Collins, then 33, crashed his Ford Thunderbird into a ditch near his home in Jacksonville, killing his girlfriend Debra Jean Watts and leaving himself permanently paralyzed from the chest down.

=== Return (1987–1995) ===
In 1987, Lynyrd Skynyrd reunited for a full-scale tour with five major members of the pre-crash band: crash survivors Gary Rossington, Billy Powell, Leon Wilkeson and Artimus Pyle, along with guitarist Ed King, who had left the band two years before the crash. Ronnie Van Zant's younger brother, Johnny, took over as the new lead singer and primary songwriter. Due to founding member Allen Collins's paralysis from his 1986 car accident, he was only able to participate as the musical director, choosing Randall Hall, his former bandmate in the Allen Collins Band, as his stand-in. In return for avoiding prison following his guilty plea to DUI manslaughter, Collins would be wheeled out onstage each night to explain to the audience why he could no longer perform (usually before the performance of "That Smell", the lyrics of which had been partially directed at him). Collins was stricken with pneumonia in 1989 and died on January 23, 1990, at age 37.

The reunited band was intended to be a one-time tribute to the original lineup, captured on the double-live album Southern by the Grace of God: Lynyrd Skynyrd Tribute Tour 1987. That the band chose to continue after the 1987 tribute tour caused legal problems for the survivors, as Judy Van Zant Jenness and Teresa Gaines Rapp (widows of Ronnie and Steve, respectively) sued the others for violating an agreement made shortly after the plane crash, stating that they would not "exploit" the Skynyrd name for profit. As part of the settlement, Jenness and Rapp collect nearly 30% of the band's touring revenues (representing the shares their husbands would have earned had they lived), and hold a proviso requiring any band touring as Lynyrd Skynyrd to include Rossington and at least two of the other four surviving members from the pre-crash era, namely Wilkeson, Powell, King and Pyle. Following this rule, the band would have been forced to retire in 2001, but they have still continued to tour for another two decades.

The band released its first post-reunion album in 1991, entitled Lynyrd Skynyrd 1991. By that time, the band had added a second drummer, Kurt Custer. Artimus Pyle left the band during the same year, with Custer becoming the band's sole drummer. That lineup released a second post-reunion album, entitled The Last Rebel in 1993. Later that year, Randall Hall was replaced by Mike Estes. In 1994, Owen Hale replaced Kurt Custer on drums.

=== Member changes and deaths (1996–2019) ===
Ed King had to take a break from touring in 1996 due to heart complications that required a transplant. In his absence, he was replaced by Hughie Thomasson. The band did not let King rejoin after he recovered. At the same time, Mike Estes was replaced by Rickey Medlocke, who had previously played and recorded with the band for a short time in the early 1970s. The result was a major retooling of the band's 'guitar army'. Medlocke and Thomasson would also become major contributors to the band's songwriting along with Rossington and Van Zant.

The first album with this new lineup, released in 1997, was titled Twenty. The band released another album, Edge of Forever in 1999. By that time, Hale had left the band, and the drums on the album were played by session drummer Kenny Aronoff. Michael Cartellone became the band's permanent drummer on the subsequent tour. Despite the growing number of post-reunion albums that the band had released up to this time, setlists showed that the band was playing mostly 1970s-era material in concert.

The band released a Christmas album, titled Christmas Time Again in 2000. Leon Wilkeson, Skynyrd's bassist since 1972, was found dead in his hotel room on July 27, 2001. His death was found to be due to emphysema and chronic liver disease. He was replaced in 2001 by Ean Evans.

The first album to feature Evans was Vicious Cycle, released in 2003. This album had improved sales over the other post-reunion albums, and had a minor hit single in the song "Red, White and Blue". The band also released a double album called Thyrty, which had songs from the original lineup to the present, and also a live DVD of their Vicious Cycle Tour. On June 22, 2004, the album Lynyrd Skynyrd Lyve: The Vicious Cycle Tour was released.

Thomasson left the band in 2005 to reform The Outlaws, and Mark "Sparky" Matejka, formerly of the country music band Hot Apple Pie, joined in 2006 as his replacement.

On March 13, 2006, Lynyrd Skynyrd was inducted into the Rock and Roll Hall of Fame (also discussed later in the article), and they reunited with former members Bob Burns (drums), Artimus Pyle (drums), and Ed King (guitar) for a performance of "Free Bird".

On November 2, 2007, the band performed for a crowd of 50,000 people at the University of Florida's Gator Growl student-run pep rally in Ben Hill Griffin Stadium ("The Swamp" football stadium). This was the largest crowd that Lynyrd Skynyrd had played to in the U.S., until the July 2008 Bama Jam in Enterprise, Alabama where more than 111,000 people attended.

On January 28, 2009, keyboardist Billy Powell died of a suspected heart attack at age 56 at his home near Jacksonville, Florida. No autopsy was carried out. He was replaced by Peter Keys.

On March 17, 2009, it was announced that Skynyrd had signed a worldwide deal with Roadrunner Records, in association with their label, Loud & Proud Records, and released their new album God & Guns on September 29 of that year. They toured Europe and the U.S. in 2009 with Keys on keyboards and Robert Kearns of the Bottle Rockets on bass; bassist Ean Evans died of cancer at age 48 on May 6, 2009. Scottish rock band Gun performed as special guests for the UK leg of Skynyrd's tour in 2010.

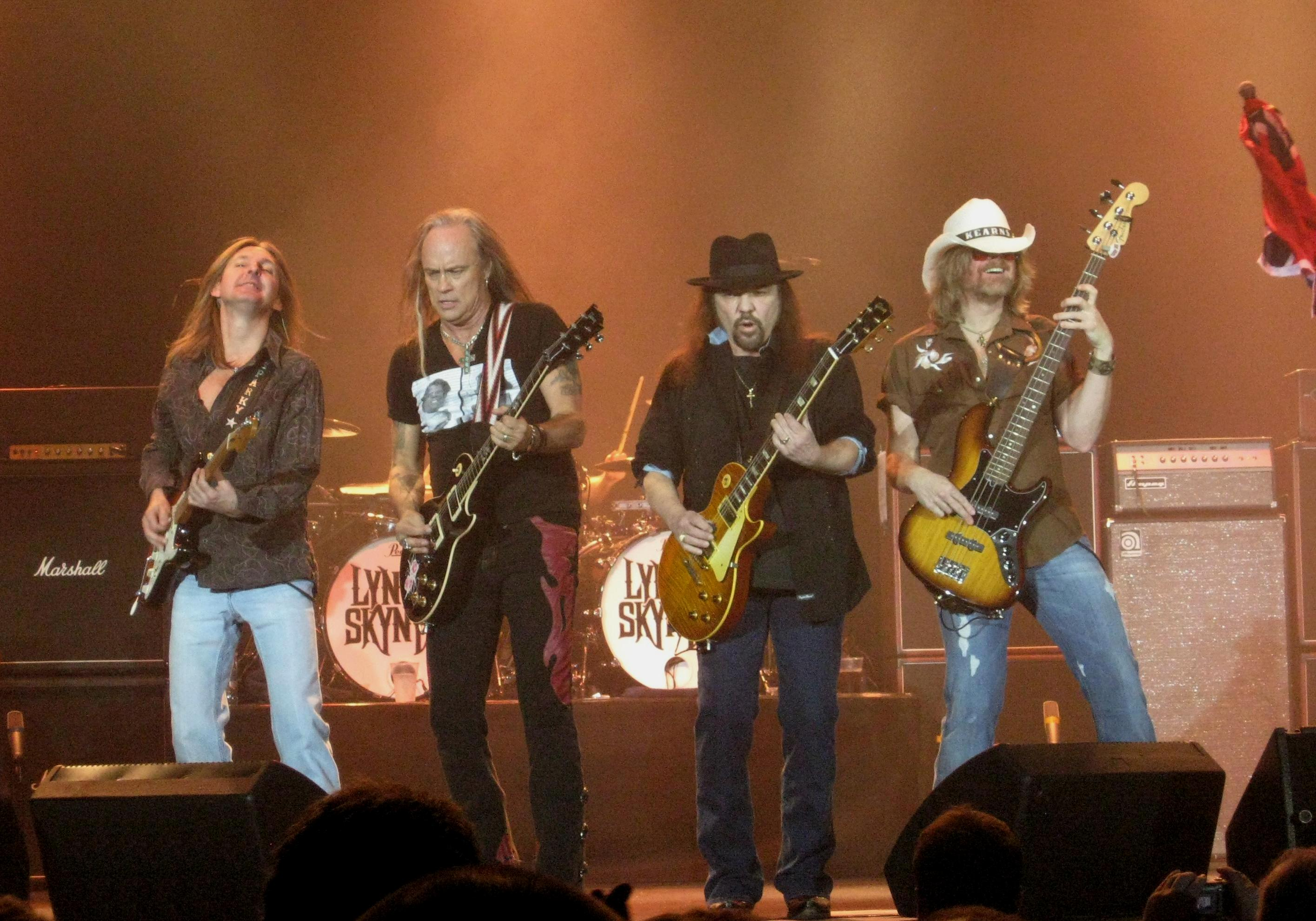
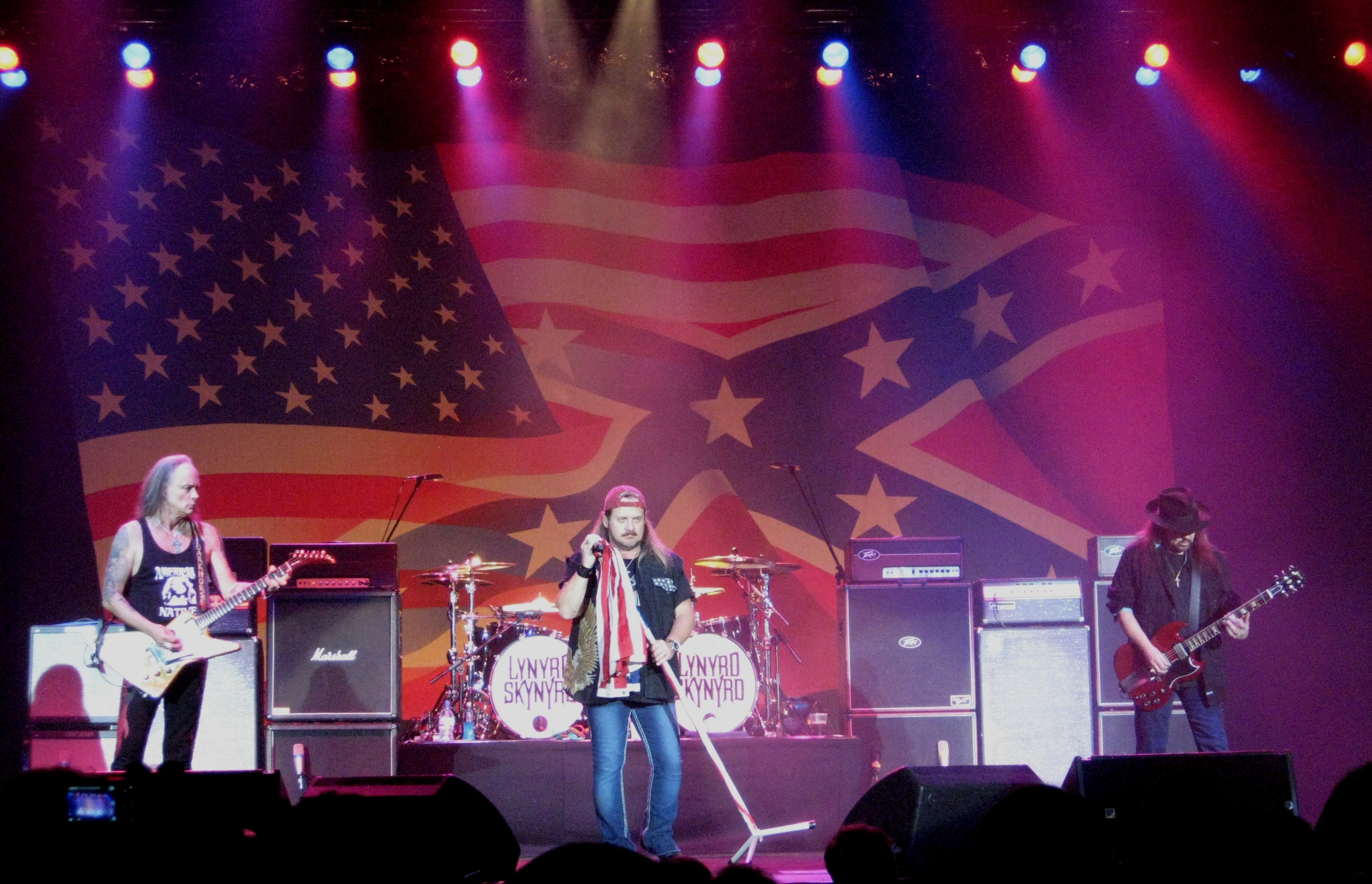
The band in 2010

In addition to the tour, Skynyrd appeared at the Sean Hannity Freedom Concert series in late 2010. Hannity had been actively promoting the God & Guns album, frequently playing portions of the track "That Ain't My America" on his radio show. The tour is titled "Rebels and Bandoleros". The band continued to tour throughout 2011, playing alongside ZZ Top and the Doobie Brothers.

On May 2, 2012, the band announced the impending release of a new studio album, Last of a Dyin' Breed, along with a North American and European tour. On August 21, 2012, Last of a Dyin' Breed was released.

Lynyrd Skynyrd used a Confederate flag from the 1970s until the 2010s, attracting criticism. While promoting the album on CNN on September 9, 2012, members of the band talked about their discontinued use of Confederate imagery. In September 2012, the band briefly did not display the Confederate flag, which had for years been a part of its stage show, because it did not want to be associated with racists that adopted the flag. However, after protests from fans, the members reversed this decision, citing it as part of the band's Southern American heritage and states' rights symbolism. The band would later cease use of the Confederate flag starting with their 2019 tour.

Original drummer Bob Burns died at age 64 on April 3, 2015; his car crashed into a tree while he was driving alone near his home in Cartersville, Georgia. From 2015 through 2017, the band had periods of being sidelined or having to cancel shows due to health problems suffered by founding member Gary Rossington.

Former member Ed King, who had been battling cancer, died in his Nashville, Tennessee, home on August 22, 2018, at 68 years of age.

=== Farewell tour, upcoming fifteenth album and the death of Rossington (2018–present) ===
On January 25, 2018, Lynyrd Skynyrd announced their Last of the Street Survivors Farewell Tour, which started on May 4, 2018. Supporting acts included Kid Rock, Hank Williams Jr., Bad Company, the Charlie Daniels Band, the Marshall Tucker Band, .38 Special, Cheap Trick, Blackberry Smoke, the Randy Bachman Band, Blackfoot, Massive Wagons, and Status Quo. Concerts were usually on Fridays and Saturdays. On January 8, 2020, Rossington stated in an interview that while they would no longer be touring, they will continue to play occasional live shows.

On March 19, 2019, Johnny Van Zant announced that the band intended to go into the studio to record one last album after completing the tour with several songs ready or "in the can". They appeared at the Kaaboo Texas festival on May 11, 2019.

Lynyrd Skynyrd was among hundreds of recording artists whose original master recordings were believed to have been destroyed in the 2008 Universal fire. Though it is not known with certainty which, if any, of the band's master recordings were lost in the blaze, Lynyrd Skynyrd was among the artists listed in an internal Universal Music Group document listing the artists whose master recordings the company believed had been lost and subsequently spent tens of millions of dollars trying to replace.

Rossington, the last founding member of the band, died on March 5, 2023, leaving no original members left alive. In April 2023, the band confirmed that they would continue as a band. There had previously been agreements about how many original members had to be in the band for them to be legally active, but the terms were completely waived following Rossington's death.

In November 2023, Dolly Parton released a cover of "Free Bird" on her rock album Rockstar; this version also featured contributions from members of Lynyrd Skynyrd (including slide guitar from Rossington, recorded before his death), along with former drummer Artimus Pyle and his band, and even part of the late Ronnie van Zant's vocal track from the original recording of "Free Bird" (with the permission of Ronnie van Zant's widow). A similar version was featured on a Pyle-led tribute album of re-recorded collaborations with other musicians on Skynyrd songs, and Skynyrd also plans (as of 2023) to release their own similar version; however, according to Parton, only her version was allowed to use Ronnie van Zant's original vocal track.

== Recognition ==
=== Honors ===
In 2004, Rolling Stone magazine ranked the group No. 95 on their list of the "100 Greatest Artists of All Time".

On November 28, 2005, the Rock and Roll Hall of Fame announced that Lynyrd Skynyrd would be inducted alongside Black Sabbath, Blondie, Miles Davis, and the Sex Pistols. They were inducted in the Waldorf Astoria Hotel in Manhattan on March 13, 2006, during the Hall's 21st annual induction ceremony. The inductees included Ronnie Van Zant, Allen Collins, Gary Rossington, Ed King, Steve Gaines, Billy Powell, Leon Wilkeson, Bob Burns, and Artimus Pyle.

=== Tributes ===
- In 2010, another country tribute album was produced, primarily by Jay Joyce, titled Sweet Home Alabama – The Country Music Tribute to Lynyrd Skynyrd. This album features a more modern country flavor than the 1994 tribute, featuring Randy Houser, Jamey Johnson, Eric Church, Eli Young Band, Uncle Kracker, Ashley Ray, Randy Montana, and Shooter Jennings.
- Ronnie Van Zant's widow, Judy Van Zant Jenness, operates a Lynyrd Skynyrd tribute website for the educational purpose of sharing the original Lynyrd Skynyrd band's history. From 1999 to 2016, she and their daughter Melody Van Zant also owned Freebird Live, a live music venue in Jacksonville Beach, Florida.
- The Drive-By Truckers paid tribute to Lynyrd Skynyrd in their album Southern Rock Opera (2001).
- A monument in Gillsburg, MS was constructed in honor of the deceased members near the site of the plane crash. It is located 8 miles west of I-55, off of State Highway 568. Fans and family members of the deceased attended the opening of the monument.

=== Biopic ===
On April 4, 2017, a biopic film project was announced. The film was later titled Street Survivors: The True Story of the Lynyrd Skynyrd Plane Crash and released in June 2020.

=== Film ===
On March 13, 2018, filmmaker Stephen Kijak premiered his documentary called, "If I Leave Here Tomorrow" at the Stateside Theater during the South by Southwest (SXSW) festival in Austin, Texas. Kijak was joined on stage by Johnny Van Zant and Gary Rossington at the world premiere to speak to fans about the film.

== Band members ==
Current members

- Rickey Medlocke – drums (1971–1972); guitar (1972, 1996–present); vocals, mandolin (1971–1972, 1996–present)
- Johnny Van Zant – lead vocals (1987–present)
- Carol Chase – backing vocals (1996–present)
- Michael Cartellone – drums (1999–present)
- Mark Matejka – guitar, backing vocals (2006–present)
- Peter Keys – keyboards (2009–present)
- Damon Johnson – guitar (2023–present; touring 2021–2023)
- Stacy Michelle – backing vocals (2023–present; touring 2023)
- Robbie Harrington – bass (2025–present)

== Tours ==
- Pronounced 'Lĕh-'nérd 'Skin-'nérd Tour (1973)
- Second Helping Tour (1974)
- Nuthin' Fancy Tour (1974–1975)
- Gimme Back My Bullets Tour (1975–1976)
- One More from the Road Tour (1976)
- Street Survivors Tour (1977)
- Lynyrd Skynyrd Tribute Tour (1987–1988)
- Lynyrd Skynyrd 1991 Tour (1991–1992)
- The Last Rebel Tour (1992–1996)
- Lynyrd Skynyrd Twenty Tour (1997–1998)
- Edge of Forever Tour (1999–2002)
- Rowdy Frynds Tour (2007)
- Vicious Cycle Tour (2003–2009)
- God & Guns Tour (2009–2012)
- Rebels and Bandoleros Tour (2011)
- Lynyrd Skynyrd 2016 North American Tour (2016)
- The Last of the Street Survivors Farewell Tour/Big Wheels Keep On Turning Tour (2018–2023)
- Sharp Dressed Simple Man Tour (2023–2024) (with ZZ Top)
- 50th Anniversary Tour (2025)
- Double Trouble Double Vision (2026) (with Foreigner)

== Discography ==
=== Studio albums ===
- (Pronounced 'Lĕh-'nérd 'Skin-'nérd) (1973)
- Second Helping (1974)
- Nuthin' Fancy (1975)
- Gimme Back My Bullets (1976)
- Street Survivors (1977)
- Lynyrd Skynyrd 1991 (1991)
- The Last Rebel (1993)
- Endangered Species (1994)
- Twenty (1997)
- Edge of Forever (1999)
- Christmas Time Again (2000)
- Vicious Cycle (2003)
- God & Guns (2009)
- Last of a Dyin' Breed (2012)
