= Little Texas discography =

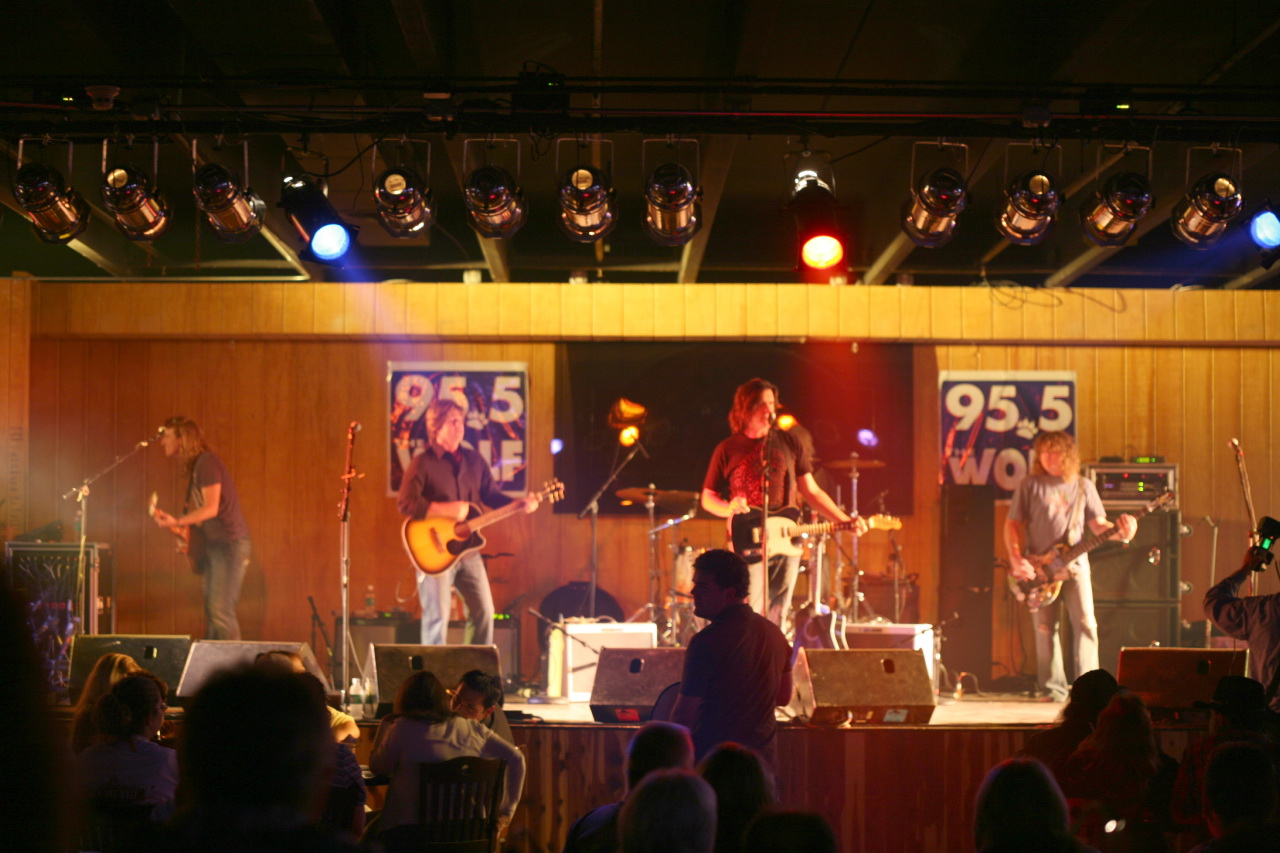
- Little Texas in 2007.
- Studio albums: 6
- Live albums: 1
- Compilation albums: 4
- Singles: 20
- Music videos: 15

American country music band Little Texas has released six studio albums, four compilation albums, one live album and 20 singles. The band made its first chart entry in 1991 with "Some Guys Have All the Love", from their album First Time for Everything. Counting this song, Little Texas charted eight songs within the top 10 of Hot Country Songs, including a number one with "My Love".

== Studio albums ==
=== 1990s albums ===
Title	Details	Peak chart positions			Certifications (sales threshold)
Title	Details	US Country	US	CAN Country	Certifications (sales threshold)
First Time for Everything	Release date: March 3, 1992; Label: Warner Bros. Nashville; Formats: CD, cassette	19	99	17	US: Gold
Big Time	Release date: May 11, 1993; Label: Warner Bros. Nashville; Formats: CD, cassette	6	55	8	CAN: Gold; US: 2× Platinum
Kick a Little	Release date: September 27, 1994; Label: Warner Bros. Nashville; Formats: CD, cassette	10	51	8	CAN: Gold; US: Platinum
Little Texas	Release date: April 22, 1997; Label: Warner Bros. Nashville; Formats: CD, cassette	47	—	—	
"—" denotes releases that did not chart

=== 2000s–2010s albums ===
Title	Details
Missing Years	Release date: June 12, 2007; Label: Montage Music Group; Formats: CD, music download
Young for a Long Time	Release date: April 14, 2015; Label: Cleopatra Records; Formats: CD, music download

== Compilation albums ==
Title	Details	Peak chart positions		Certifications (sales threshold)
Title	Details	US Country	US	Certifications (sales threshold)
Greatest Hits	Release date: September 26, 1995; Label: Warner Bros. Nashville; Formats: CD, cassette	17	82	US: Gold
Super Hits, Volume 3	Release date: February 8, 2000; Label: Warner Bros. Nashville/WEA; Formats: CD, cassette	—	—	
Country Classics	Release date: September 14, 2004; Label: Rhino Records; Formats: CD, music download	—	—	
Rhino Hi-Five: Little Texas	Release date: June 26, 2007; Label: Rhino Records; Formats: music download	—	—	
"—" denotes releases that did not chart

== Live albums ==
Title	Details
Live and Loud	Release date: May 15, 2007; Label: Montage Music Group; Formats: CD, music download

== Singles ==
Year	Single	Peak chart positions				Album
Year	Single	US Country	US	US AC	CAN Country	Album
1991	"Some Guys Have All the Love"	8	—	—	11	First Time for Everything
1992	"First Time for Everything"	13	—	—	18	First Time for Everything
1992	"You and Forever and Me"	5	—	—	18	First Time for Everything
1992	"What Were You Thinkin'"	17	—	—	21	First Time for Everything
1993	"I'd Rather Miss You"	16	—	—	13	First Time for Everything
1993	"What Might Have Been"	2	74	16	11	Big Time
1993	"God Blessed Texas"	4	55	—	—	Big Time
1994	"My Love"	1	83	—	2	Big Time
1994	"Stop on a Dime"	14	—	—	13	Big Time
1994	"Kick a Little"	5	— (Note: "Kick a Little" did not enter the Hot 100, but peaked at number 8 on Bubbling Under Hot 100 Singles, which acts as a 25-song extension of the Hot 100.)	—	4	Kick a Little
1994	"Amy's Back in Austin"	4	—	—	6	Kick a Little
1995	"Southern Grace"	27	—	—	18	Kick a Little
1995	"Life Goes On"	5	—	—	4	Greatest Hits
1995	"Country Crazy"	44	—	—	51	Greatest Hits
1997	"Bad for Us"	45	—	—	60	Little Texas
1997	"Your Mama Won't Let Me"	64	—	—	—	Little Texas
1997	"The Call"	71	—	—	—	Little Texas
2006	"Your Woman"	—	—	—	—	Missing Years
2007	"Missing Years"	45	—	—	—	Missing Years
2007	"Party Life"	—	—	—	—	Missing Years
"—" denotes releases that did not chart

=== As a featured artist ===
Year	Single	Artist(s)	Peak chart positions		Album
Year	Single	Artist(s)	US Country	US Bubbling	Album
1995	"Party All Night"	Jeff Foxworthy (with Scott Rouse)	53	1	Crank It Up: The Music Album
1996	"Hope"	Hope: Country Music's Quest for a Cure	57	—	—N/a
"—" denotes releases that did not chart

== Other charted songs ==
Year	Single	Peak chart positions		Album
Year	Single	US Country	CAN Country	Album
1993	"Peaceful Easy Feeling"	73	—	Common Thread: The Songs of the Eagles
1996	"Kiss the Girl"	52	72	The Best of Country Sing the Best of Disney
"—" denotes releases that did not chart

== Videography ==
=== Music videos ===
Year	Video	Director
1991	"Some Guys Have All the Love"	Jim May
1992	"First Time for Everything"	Charley Randazzo
1992	"You and Forever and Me"	Jim Shea
1993	"I'd Rather Miss You"	Ken Ross
1993	"What Might Have Been"	Jack Cole
1994	"God Blessed Texas"	Gerry Wenner
1994	"My Love"	Gerry Wenner
1994	"Kick a Little"	Jon Small
1995	"Amy's Back in Austin"	D. J. Webster
1995	"Southern Grace"	Jack Cole
1995	"Life Goes On"	Gerry Wenner
1997	"Bad for Us"	Deaton Flanigen
1997	"Your Mama Won't Let Me"	Ken Carpenter
2006	"Your Woman"	Roman White
2007	"Missing Years"	Roman White

=== Guest appearances ===
Year	Video	Director
1995	"Party All Night" (with Jeff Foxworthy)	"Weird Al" Yankovic
1996	"Hope" (Various Artists)	Frank W. Ockenfels III
