= The Very Best of Little Texas: Live and Loud =

Live album by Little Texas
- Released: May 15, 2007
- Genre: Country
- Length: 45:52
- Label: Montage Music Group
- Producer: Anthony Martin, Ed Seay

Little Texas chronology
Little Texas (1997)	The Very Best of Little Texas: Live and Loud (2007)	Missing Years (2007)

Professional ratings
Review scores
Source	Rating
Allmusic	link
Country Standard Time	link

The Very Best of Little Texas: Live and Loud is a live album, released in 2007 by the country music band Little Texas. It is the band's first live album, and it includes live renditions of several hits, as well as covers of the Eagles' "Peaceful Easy Feeling" and The Beatles' "Get Back". This is the first album that the group recorded with Porter Howell on lead vocals, following the departure of Steven Troy (who, in turn, had succeeded former co-lead vocalists Tim Rushlow and Brady Seals).

== Track listing ==
1. "Hello Again" (Porter Howell, Brady Seals) – 3:11
2. "Life Goes On" (Keith Follesé, Thom McHugh, Del Gray) – 2:37
3. "Amy's Back in Austin" (Seals, Stephen Allen Davis) – 4:22
4. Medley: "Some Guys Have All the Love" (Dwayne O'Brien, Porter Howell) /"My Love" (Howell, Seals, Tommy Barnes) /"First Time for Everything" (O'Brien, Howell) – 9:16
5. "Peaceful Easy Feeling" (Jack Tempchin) – 4:28
6. "Loud and Proud" (Howell, Sam Gay) – 3:18
7. "Kick a Little" (Seals, Howell, O'Brien) – 3:57
8. Medley: "You and Forever and Me" (Howell, Stewart Harris) /"I'd Rather Miss You" (Howell, O'Brien) – 1:56
9. "What Might Have Been" (Seals, Howell, O'Brien) – 4:20
10. "Get Back" (John Lennon, Paul McCartney) – 3:52
11. "God Blessed Texas" (Howell, Seals) – 4:35

== Personnel ==
- Del Gray – drums
- Porter Howell – electric guitar, lead vocals
- Dwayne O'Brien – acoustic guitar, background vocals
- Duane Propes – bass guitar, background vocals
- Mark Sutton – acoustic guitar, background vocals
