= Greatest Hits (Little Texas album) =

Little Texas – Greatest Hits

Greatest hits album by Little Texas
- Released: September 26, 1995
- Genre: Country
- Length: 45:05
- Label: Warner Bros. Nashville
- Producer: Christy DiNapoli; Doug Grau; James Stroud

Little Texas chronology
Kick a Little (1994)	Little Texas – Greatest Hits (1995)	Little Texas (1997)

Singles from Greatest Hits
- 1. "Life Goes On" Released: August 21, 1995

Professional ratings
Review scores
Source	Rating
Allmusic	link
Entertainment Weekly	C link

Greatest Hits is the first compilation album by American country music group Little Texas, released on September 26, 1995 via Warner Bros. Records. It is composed of nine tracks from their first three studio albums (1992's First Time for Everything, 1993's Big Time, and 1994's Kick a Little), as well as the newly recorded tracks "Life Goes On" and "Country Crazy"; released as singles in 1995, these songs reached #5 and #44, respectively, on the Hot Country Songs charts, with the former being their last Top 40 single of their career. Also included is the band's rendition of the Eagles hit "Peaceful Easy Feeling", which was previously included on 1993's Common Thread: The Songs of the Eagles.

== Track listing ==
No.	Title	Writer(s)	Length
1.	"God Blessed Texas"	Porter Howell, Brady Seals	3:27
2.	"Some Guys Have All the Love"	Howell, Dwayne O'Brien	2:53
3.	"You and Forever and Me"	Howell, Stewart Harris	3:44
4.	"Amy's Back in Austin"	Seals, Stephen Allen Davis	4:35
5.	"What Might Have Been"	Howell, O'Brien, Seals	3:58
6.	"First Time for Everything"	Howell, O'Brien	4:00
7.	"Kick a Little"	Howell, O'Brien, Seals	3:42
8.	"My Love"	Howell, Seals, Tommy Barnes	4:05
9.	"Life Goes On"	Del Gray, Thom McHugh, Keith Follesé	2:40
10.	"Peaceful Easy Feeling"	Jack Tempchin	4:19
11.	"I'd Rather Miss You"	Howell, O'Brien	3:57
12.	"Country Crazy"	Howell, Chuck Jones	3:45

== Charts ==
=== Weekly charts ===
Chart (1995)	Peak position
US Billboard 200	82
US Top Country Albums (Billboard)	17

=== Year-end charts ===
Chart (1996)	Position
US Top Country Albums (Billboard)	52
