= Last of a Dyin' Breed =

Studio album by Lynyrd Skynyrd
- Released: August 21, 2012
- Genres: Southern rock, hard rock
- Length: 45:01
- Labels: Roadrunner Records/Loud and Proud Records
- Producer: Bob Marlette

Lynyrd Skynyrd chronology
Icon (2010)	Last of a Dyin' Breed (2012)	One More for the Fans (2015)

Professional ratings
Aggregate scores
Source	Rating
Metacritic	44/100
Review scores
Source	Rating
AllMusic	3/5 stars
Boston Phoenix	0/4 stars
Ultimate Classic Rock	7/10
Sputnik Music	3/5 stars

Last of a Dyin' Breed is the fourteenth studio album by American Southern rock band Lynyrd Skynyrd. The album was announced on May 2, 2012, for release on August 21, 2012, and September 17 in the UK. It is the first Lynyrd Skynyrd album to feature Peter Keys on keyboards and the only album to feature Johnny Colt on bass (he does not appear on the tracks, but is nevertheless credited) and features guest guitarist John 5. It was also the final album to feature guitarist Gary Rossington before his death in 2023. The first single, "Last of a Dyin' Breed", was made available to purchase via iTunes on July 9, 2012.

Last of a Dyin' Breed peaked at No. 14 on the U.S. Billboard pop charts, topping the 2009 album God & Guns to become the band's highest-charting studio album since 1977's Street Survivors.

== Background ==
Following the preceding studio album God & Guns (2009), Bob Marlette was once again brought in as the producer. John 5, who had contributed as a guest musician on God & Guns after being introduced by Marlette, also participated in the production of this album.

According to Gary Rossington, the album's title track, which was released as its lead single, reflected the band's feeling that they were "one of the endangered species of bands," as most of the Southern rock bands that had enjoyed popularity during the 1970s had either disbanded or faded from public memory following the deaths of their members.

== Track listing ==
No.	Title	Writer(s)	Length
1.	"Last of a Dyin' Breed"	Gary Rossington, Johnny Van Zant, Rickey Medlocke, Mark Matejka, Dan Serafini, Bob Marlette	3:51
2.	"One Day at a Time"	Rossington, J. Van Zant, Medlocke, Marlon Young	3:46
3.	"Homegrown"	Rossington, J. Van Zant, Medlocke, Blair Daly	3:41
4.	"Ready to Fly"	Rossington, J. Van Zant, Medlocke, Audley Freed	5:26
5.	"Mississippi Blood"	Rossington, J. Van Zant, Medlocke, Jaren Johnston	2:57
6.	"Good Teacher"	J. Van Zant, Donnie Van Zant, Tom Hambridge, Daly	3:07
7.	"Something to Live For"	Rossington, J. Van Zant, Medlocke, John Lowery, Marlette	4:29
8.	"Life's Twisted"	Daly, Jon Lawhon, Chris Robertson	4:33
9.	"Nothing Comes Easy"	Rossington, J. Van Zant, Medlocke, Hambridge	4:13
10.	"Honey Hole"	Rossington, J. Van Zant, Medlocke, Hambridge	4:35
11.	"Start Livin' Life Again"	J. Van Zant, D. Van Zant, Marlette, Lowery	4:23
Total length:			45:01

Special Edition Bonus Tracks
No.	Title	Writer(s)	Length
12.	"Poor Man's Dream"	Rossington, J. Van Zant, Medlocke, Lowery, Marlette	4:07
13.	"Do It Up Right"	Rossington, J. Van Zant, Medlocke, Hambridge	3:56
14.	"Sad Song"	Rossington, J. Van Zant	4:01
15.	"Low Down Dirty"	Rossington, J. Van Zant, Medlocke	3:14

Classic Rock fanpack bonus tracks
No.	Title	Writer(s)	Length
12.	"Poor Man's Dream"	Rossington, J. Van Zant, Medlocke, Lowery, Marlette	4.07
13.	"Do It Up Right"	Rossington, J. Van Zant, Medlocke, Hambridge	3.56
14.	"Skynyrd Nation" (live, fanpack Exclusive bonus track)	J. Van Zant, Medlocke, Lowery, Marlette	3:20
15.	"Gimme Three Steps" (live, fanpack Exclusive bonus track)	Allen Collins, Ronnie Van Zant	4:58

== Personnel ==
Lynyrd Skynyrd

- Johnny Van Zant – lead vocals
- Gary Rossington – lead guitar
- Rickey Medlocke – lead guitar
- Mark Matejka – lead guitar
- Peter Keys – keyboards
- Michael Cartellone – drums (credited, but does not appear on the album)
- Johnny Colt – bass (credited, but does not appear on the album)
- Dale Krantz-Rossington – backing vocals (credited, but does not appear on the album)
- Carol Chase – backing vocals (credited, but does not appear on the album)

Additional personnel

- Greg Morrow – drums
- Mike Brignardello – bass guitar
- John 5 – lead guitar
- Jerry Douglas – dobro
- Stacey Michelle Plunk – backing vocals
- Chip Davis – backing vocals
- Lisa Parade – strings arrangement and horns

== Charts ==
Chart (2012)	Peak position
Austrian Albums (Ö3 Austria)	33
Belgian Albums (Ultratop Flanders)	100
Belgian Albums (Ultratop Wallonia)	49
Dutch Albums (Album Top 100)	72
Finnish Albums (Suomen virallinen lista)	10
French Albums (SNEP)	55
German Albums (Offizielle Top 100)	14
Italian Albums (FIMI)	45
Norwegian Albums (VG-lista)	12
Scottish Albums (Official Charts)	61
Swedish Albums (Sverigetopplistan)	18
Swiss Albums (Schweizer Hitparade)	13
UK Albums (Official Charts)	83
US Billboard 200	14
US Top Rock Albums (Billboard)	3
US Indie Store Album Sales (Billboard)	12
