= Would You Love Me =

Would You Love Me may refer to:

- Would You Love Me, a 2014 song by Gummy (singer)
- Would You Love Me, a song from Dream Big (Ryan Shupe & the RubberBand album)
- Would You Love Me?, a song from Yours (Russell Dickerson album)
