= Missing years =

Missing years may refer to:

- Missing years (Jewish calendar), a chronological discrepancy between Rabbinic chronologists for the destruction of the First Temple in 423 BCE (3338 AM) or 403 BCE (3358 AM) and the modern secular dating for it in 2024
- Unknown years of Jesus, also known as the missing years, an 18-year period of his life that is not documented in the Bible
- Intertestamental period, the period between the Old and New Testaments of the Bible
- Missing Years (album), a 2007 album by Little Texas or its title track
- The Missing Years (album), a 1991 album by John Prine
- The Thorn Birds: The Missing Years, a 1996 miniseries
- I Know My First Name Is Steven (The Missing Years), a 1989 miniseries about Steven Stayner

== See also ==
- Years of potential life lost, a measure of how long a person could have lived if not for a premature death
- Dark Ages (historiography)
