= Live from Freedom Hall =

Live album by Lynyrd Skynyrd
- Released: June 22, 2010
- Recorded: June 15, 2007
- Venues: Freedom Hall, Louisville, Kentucky
- Genres: Southern rock, hard rock, blues rock, boogie rock
- Length: 79:36
- Label: Roadrunner
- Producer: Evan Haiman

Lynyrd Skynyrd chronology
God & Guns (2009)	Live from Freedom Hall (2010)	Icon (2010)

Live from Freedom Hall is a live album by the "post-crash" lineup of southern rock band Lynyrd Skynyrd, released on June 22, 2010, after their eleventh studio album God & Guns. The set includes a CD with 15 live tracks and a DVD of that concert. This is the first Lynyrd Skynyrd album produced by Evan Haiman. Both Ean Evans and Billy Powell died before the release of this album, and it is also their last live album with the band.

Professional ratings
Review scores
Source	Rating
Allmusic	link

== Track listing ==
1. "Travelin' Man" (Leon Wilkeson, Ronnie Van Zant) - 4:06
2. "Workin'" (Gary Rossington, Johnny Van Zant, Rickey Medlocke, Hughie Thomasson) - 4:49
3. "What's Your Name?" (Gary Rossington, Ronnie Van Zant) - 3:51
4. "That Smell" (Allen Collins, Ronnie Van Zant) - 5:52
5. "Simple Man" (Gary Rossington, Ronnie Van Zant) - 7:37
6. "Down South Jukin'" (Gary Rossington, Ronnie Van Zant) - 1:41
7. "The Needle and the Spoon" (Allen Collins, Ronnie Van Zant) - 2:32
8. "The Ballad of Curtis Loew" (Allen Collins, Ronnie Van Zant) - 4:36
9. "Gimme Back My Bullets" (Gary Rossington, Ronnie Van Zant) - 2:11
10. "Tuesday's Gone" (Allen Collins, Ronnie Van Zant) - 6:19
11. "Red White and Blue" (Johnny Van Zant, Donnie Van Zant, Brad Warren, Brett Warren) - 5:39
12. "Gimme Three Steps" (Allen Collins, Ronnie Van Zant) - 6:17
13. "Call Me the Breeze" (J.J. Cale) - 5:46
14. "Sweet Home Alabama" (Ed King, Gary Rossington, Ronnie Van Zant) - 6:22
15. "Free Bird" (Allen Collins, Ronnie Van Zant) - 12:11

== Musicians ==
Lynyrd Skynyrd

- Gary Rossington - Guitar
- Johnny Van Zant - Lead Vocals
- Billy Powell - Keyboards
- Rickey Medlocke- Guitar, Background Vocals
- Michael Cartellone - Drums
- Ean Evans - Bass, Background Vocals
- Mark Matejka - Guitar, Background Vocals
- Dale Krantz-Rossington - Background Vocals
- Carol Chase - Background Vocals

Additional musicians

- Steve Traum - Harmonica

== Chart positions ==
Chart (2010)	Peak position
French Albums (SNEP)	175
German Albums (Offizielle Top 100)	74
Greek Albums (IFPI)	38
Italian Albums (FIMI)	63
