= Hillbillies (song) =

Single by Hot Apple Pie

from the album Hot Apple Pie
- Released: March 19, 2005
- Genre: Country
- Length: 3:20
- Label: DreamWorks
- Songwriter(s): Brady Seals, Greg McDowell, Kizzy Plush
- Producer(s): Richard Landis

Hot Apple Pie singles chronology
"Hillbillies" (2005)	"We're Makin' Up" (2005)

"Hillbillies" is a song recorded by American country music group Hot Apple Pie. It was released in March 2005 as the first single from the album Hot Apple Pie. The song reached #26 on the Billboard Hot Country Songs chart. Lead singer Brady Seals wrote the song with Greg McDowell and Kizzy Plush.

== Critical reception ==
Michael Sudhalter of Country Standard Time praised the song in his review of the album, saying that it was a "humorous look at the pleasures of country life with a beat that combines country with funk and soul."

== Chart performance ==
Chart (2005)	Peak position
US Hot Country Songs (Billboard)	26
