= Missing Years (album) =

Studio album by Little Texas
- Released: June 12, 2007
- Genre: Country
- Label: Montage Music Group
- Producer: Anthony Martin

Little Texas chronology
The Very Best of Little Texas: Live and Loud (2007)	Missing Years (2007)	Young for a Long Time (2015)

Singles from Missing Years
- 1. "Your Woman" Released: October 30, 2006

Professional ratings
Review scores
Source	Rating
AllMusic	3.5/5 stars
Country Standard Time	

Missing Years is the fifth studio album by the American country music band Little Texas. Released in 2007 on Montage Music Group, it is the band's first studio album for that label, and its first new studio album since 1997's Little Texas. It is also the first studio album not to feature former co-lead vocalists Brady Seals and Tim Rushlow. Here, lead guitarist Porter Howell serves as lead vocalist, and the other three remaining members (drummer Del Gray, rhythm guitarist Dwayne O'Brien, and bass guitarist Duane Propes) are retained.

This album produced three singles in "Your Woman", the title track, and "Party Life". While neither "Your Woman" nor "Party Life" charted, "Missing Years" reached number 45 on the Hot Country Songs charts in 2007, giving the band its first chart single in ten years.

== Track listing ==
1. "Gotta Get Me Down Home" (Quinn Loggins) - 3:03
2. "Missing Years" (Del Gray, Porter Howell, Dwayne O'Brien) - 4:12
3. "Rebel" (Gray, Howell, Templeton Thompson) - 3:46
4. "Knees" (Marc Beeson, Don Pfrimmer) - 3:48
5. "A Reason" (Gray, Howell) - 4:16
6. "Party Life" (Gray, Howell, O'Brien) - 2:55
7. "Texas 101" (Howell, Johnny Slate, Paul Jefferson) - 4:00
8. "So Long" (Anthony Smith, Liz Hengber, James Dean Hicks) - 4:18
9. "When He's Gone" (Gray, Howell, O'Brien) - 4:04
10. "You Ain't Seen Me Lately" (Gray, Howell, O'Brien) - 3:46
11. "Your Blues" (Angelo Petraglia, Brett James) - 3:38
12. "Your Woman" (Jon McElroy, Del Gray) - 3:49

== Personnel ==
=== Little Texas ===
- Del Gray – drums
- Porter Howell – electric guitar, lead vocals
- Dwayne O'Brien – acoustic guitar, background vocals
- Duane Propes – bass guitar, background vocals

=== Additional musicians ===
- Eric Darken – box, percussion
- Dan Dugmore – acoustic guitar, electric guitar, steel guitar
- Russ Pahl – acoustic guitar, steel guitar
- Strings by the Nashville String Machine, arranged by Kris Wilkinson.
