= The Truth (Brady Seals album) =

Brady Seals - The Truth

Studio album by Brady Seals
- Released: February 25, 1997
- Studio: Treasure Isle
- Genre: Country
- Length: 37:05
- Label: Reprise
- Producer: Rodney Crowell; Brady Seals

Brady Seals chronology
Brady Seals - The Truth (1997)	Brady Seals (1998)

Singles from The Truth
- 1. "Another You, Another Me" Released: September 7, 1996

Professional ratings
Review scores
Source	Rating
Allmusic	link
Country Standard Time	link

The Truth is the debut solo studio album by American country music singer Brady Seals, and his first solo album after leaving the country band Little Texas. It was released on February 25, 1997, on Reprise Records. The album includes the singles "Another You, Another Me", "Still Standing Tall", and "Natural Born Lovers". Of these, only "Another You, Another Me" reached Top 40 on Hot Country Songs.

== Track listing ==
No.	Title	Writer(s)	Length
1.	"Natural Born Lovers"	Brady Seals, Troy Seals, T.J. Seals, Eddie Setser	3:45
2.	"The Truth"	B. Seals, T.J. Seals, Christopher Bogan	3:39
3.	"Another You, Another Me"	T. Seals, Will Jennings	3:56
4.	"Still Standing Tall"	B. Seals, Tommy Barnes	2:45
5.	"Kentucky Boy"	T. Seals	3:04
6.	"Boy Oh Boy (Ain't That Just Like My Girl)"	T. J. Seals, T. Seals, Bogan, Mike Gallagher	4:29
7.	"She"	T.J. Seals, B. Seals	3:40
8.	"You Can Have Your Way with Me"	T.J. Seals, B. Seals	4:08
9.	"She Doesn't Love Here Anymore"	T.J. Seals, B. Seals	3:02
10.	"Junkie for Your Love"	T.J. Seals, B. Seals	4:37

== Personnel ==
Musicians

- Norton Buffalo - harmonica (4)
- Max Carl - background vocals (1, 4)
- Jerry Douglas - Weissenborn (7), Dobro (8)
- Buddy Emmons - steel guitar (6)
- Kim Fleming - background vocals (10)
- Rob Hajacos - fiddle (5), mandolin (5)
- Vicki Hampton - background vocals (10)
- Tommy Harden - drums (all tracks except 3 and 10), percussion (1, 2, 7, 8, 9)
- Tony Harrell - Hammond B-3 organ (1), piano (3, 7, 10), keyboards (3, 6)
- John Hobbs - piano (5)
- Wynonna Judd - background vocals (3)
- Paul Leim - drums (3, 10)
- Nashville String Machine - strings (2, 7, 9)
- Michael Rhodes - bass guitar (all tracks)
- Chris Rodriguez - electric guitar (1–4, 8, 10), acoustic guitar (2, 3, 5, 6), background vocals (1, 2, 4–7)
- Brady Seals - vocals, Hammond B-3 organ (4), acoustic guitar (8)
- T.J. Seals - background vocals (1, 4, 8, 10), keyboards (8)
- Steuart Smith - electric guitar (1–6, 8, 10), nylon-string guitar (7), slide guitar (8), acoustic guitar (9)
- Harry Stinson - background vocals (5)

Technical

- Peter Coleman - recording, mixing
- Rodney Crowell - producer
- Scott Esteran - photography
- Lisa Jenkins - production assistant
- Dan Lefler - recording assistant
- Laura Lipuma-Nash - art direction
- George Marino - mastering
- Frank Ockenfels - photography
- Michael Omartian - string arrangement (2, 7, 9)
- Garrett Rittenberry - album design
- Brady Seals - producer
- Greg Wilkinson - production assistant

== Chart performance ==
Chart (1997)	Peak position
U.S. Billboard Top Country Albums	44
U.S. Billboard Top Heatseekers	39
Canadian RPM Country Albums	36
