= Last Man Standing (Ryan Shupe & The RubberBand album) =

Studio album by Ryan Shupe & the RubberBand
- Released: May 27, 2008
- Genre: Country
- Label: Montage Music Group
- Producer: Ryan Shupe & the RubberBand; Jason Deere

Ryan Shupe & the RubberBand chronology
Dream Big (2003/2005)	Last Man Standing (2008)	Brand New Shoes (2010)

Professional ratings
Review scores
Source	Rating
Angrycountry.com	favorable link
Country Standard Time	favorable link

Last Man Standing is American country music band Ryan Shupe & the RubberBand's fourth studio album. It was released on May 27, 2008 on the Montage Music Group label. The album comprises eleven songs, all written by lead vocalist and fiddler Ryan Shupe. The band co-produced it with Jason Deere.

== Track listing ==
All songs written by Ryan Shupe.

1. "Don't Leave Me Lonely" – 2:47
2. "Last Man Standing (Number One)" – 3:42
3. "Please Be Mine" – 2:53
4. "All I Need" – 4:27
5. "So" – 3:08
6. "10,000 Lakes" – 3:46
7. "If You Could Live a Different Life" – 4:04
8. "My Life" – 3:23
9. "Lonely Person" – 4:47
10. "Be the One" – 2:52
11. "Corn Dogs" – 4:42

== Associated Events ==
The band held a contest conducted from their official MySpace page, where a new song from the album was posted every few days for several weeks. A person was selected at random from the band's list of friends that had either put the new song on their personal page, or made the album's cover art their profile picture to win an autographed copy of the CD. They also held an essay contest to find an MC for their CD release concert, which was held in Sandy, Utah on June 6, 2008.
