= Thompson Street =

Thompson Street may refer to:

- Thompson Street (album), an album by Brady Seals
- Thompson Street (Manhattan), a street in Manhattan, New York City
