= Brady Seals (album) =

Studio album by Brady Seals
- Released: August 25, 1998
- Genre: Country
- Length: 34:56
- Label: Warner Bros. Nashville
- Producer: Rodney Crowell, Brady Seals

Brady Seals chronology
The Truth (1997)	Brady Seals (1998)	Thompson Street (2003)

Professional ratings
Review scores
Source	Rating
Allmusic	link

Brady Seals is the self-titled second album by American country music singer Brady Seals. It is his second release independently of the band Little Texas, of which he was a member until 1995. The album includes the singles "I Fell", "Whole Lotta Hurt" and "The Best Is Yet to Come". All three singles charted on the Billboard country charts, although they all missed Top 40.

== Track listing ==
1. "Whole Lotta Hurt" (Jamie O'Hara, Brady Seals) – 2:47
2. "Country as a Boy Can Be" (Tommy Barnes, Greg McDowell, B. Seals) – 3:22
3. "The Best Is Yet to Come" (Rodney Crowell, B. Seals) – 3:54
4. "Summer Night Lovin' You" (B. Seals) – 3:17
5. "I Fell" (Barnes) – 3:33
6. "Love You Too Much" (O'Hara, B. Seals) – 2:49
7. "You're My Kind of Woman" (Barnes, B. Seals) – 3:03
8. "All My Devotion" (O'Hara, B. Seals) – 4:00
9. "Kickin' and Screamin'" (John Greenebaum, Eddie Setser, Troy Seals) – 4:11
10. "I Get High Lovin' You" (Barnes) – 4:00

== Personnel ==
- Sam Bacco – percussion
- Eddie Bayers – drums
- Tim Buppert – background vocals
- Max Carl – background vocals
- John Cowan – background vocals
- Rodney Crowell – background vocals
- Stuart Duncan – fiddle
- Béla Fleck – banjo
- Paul Franklin – steel guitar
- Vince Gill – background vocals
- Tony Harrell – keyboards
- John Hobbs – Hammond organ, piano
- Liana Manis – background vocals
- Carl Marsh – string arrangements
- Michael Rhodes – bass guitar
- Chris Rodriguez – acoustic guitar, background vocals
- Timothy B. Schmit – background vocals
- Brady Seals – lead vocals
- Ricky Skaggs – background vocals
- Steuart Smith – electric guitar
- Biff Watson – acoustic guitar
