= Icon (Lynyrd Skynyrd album) =

Greatest hits album by Lynyrd Skynyrd
- Released: August 31, 2010
- Genre: Southern rock, boogie rock
- Length: 67:26
- Language: English
- Label: Geffen

Lynyrd Skynyrd compilations chronology
Live from Freedom Hall (2010)	Icon (2010)	Last of a Dyin' Breed (2012)

Professional ratings
Review scores
Source	Rating
Allmusic	4/5 stars

Icon is a compilation album from the American southern rock band Lynyrd Skynyrd. It was released on August 31, 2010. The album was certified Gold on November 12, 2015, by the RIAA.

== Album Information ==
Lynyrd Skynyrd's Icon collection was released as a part of the Icon album series released by Universal Music Enterprises (UMe), a collection of compilation albums "from 30 major artists spanning rock, pop, R&B and country."

Icon comes in a standard one-disc edition, as well as a two-disc edition titled Icon 2 which features an additional live track and rarities in addition to other singles from the band.

== Track listing ==
1. "Sweet Home Alabama" (Ed King, Gary Rossington, Ronnie Van Zant) - 4:45
2. "I Ain't the One" (Rossington, Van Zant) - 3:54
3. "Tuesday's Gone" (Allen Collins, Van Zant) - 7:33
4. "Gimme Three Steps" (Collins, Van Zant) - 4:30
5. "Simple Man" (Rossington, Van Zant) - 5:58
6. "Call Me the Breeze" (J.J. Cale) - 5:09
7. "You Got That Right" (Steve Gaines, Van Zant) - 3:47
8. "That Smell" (Collins, Van Zant) - 5:48
9. "Swamp Music" (King, Van Zant) - 3:33
10. "Saturday Night Special" (King, Van Zant) - 5:10
11. "What's Your Name?" (Rossington, Van Zant) - 3:33
12. "Free Bird" (Live) (Collins, Van Zant) - 13:48
- Tracks 1, 6, and 9 from Second Helping (1974)
- Tracks 2–5 from (Pronounced 'Lĕh-'nérd 'Skin-'nérd) (1973)
- Tracks 7–8 and 11 from Street Survivors (1977)
- Track 10 from Nuthin' Fancy (1975)
- Track 12 from One More from the Road (1976) and recorded live on 7/8/1976 at the Fox Theatre in Atlanta, Georgia

== Icon 2 track listing ==
=== Disc 1 ===
1. "Sweet Home Alabama" (King, Rossington, Van Zant) - 4:45
2. "Comin' Home" (Original version) (Collins, Van Zant) - 5:30
3. "I Ain't the One" (Rossington, Van Zant) - 3:54
4. "Mr. Banker" (Rossington, King, Van Zant) - 5:21
5. "Tuesday's Gone" (Collins, Van Zant) - 7:33
6. "Gimme Three Steps" (Collins, Van Zant) - 4:30
7. "The Ballad of Curtis Loew" (Collins, Van Zant) - 4:52
8. "Simple Man" (Rossington, Van Zant) - 5:58
9. "Swamp Music" (King, Van Zant) - 3:33
10. "Was I Right or Wrong?" (Rossington, Van Zant) - 5:25
11. "Workin' for MCA" (King, Van Zant) - 4:47
12. "Free Bird" (Collins, Van Zant) - 9:10

=== Disc 2 ===
1. "Call Me the Breeze" (Cale) - 5:08
2. "Saturday Night Special" (King, Van Zant) - 5:09
3. "Double Trouble" (Collins, Van Zant) - 2:50
4. "All I Can Do Is Write About It" (Acoustic version) (Collins, Van Zant) - 4:24
5. "Gimme Back My Bullets" (Rossington, Van Zant) - 3:29
6. "Four Walls of Raiford" (Undubbed demo) (Jeff Carlisi, Van Zant) - 4:14
7. "Whiskey Rock-A-Roller" (Live) (King, Billy Powell, Van Zant) - 4:16
8. "That Smell" (Collins, Van Zant) - 5:48
9. "I Know a Little" (Gaines) - 3:28
10. "You Got That Right" (Gaines, Van Zant) - 3:47
11. "What's Your Name?" (Rossington, Van Zant) - 3:33
12. "Free Bird" (Live) (Collins, Van Zant) - 13:48
- Disc 1, Tracks 1, 7, 9, and 11 and Disc 2, Track 1 from Second Helping
- Disc 1, Track 2 from The Essential Lynyrd Skynyrd (1998)
- Disc 1, Tracks 3, 5–6, 8, and 12 from (Pronounced 'Lĕh-'nérd 'Skin-'nérd)
- Disc 1, Track 4 from Legend (1987)
- Disc 1, Track 10 from Skynyrd's First and... Last (1978)
- Disc 2, Track 2 from Nuthin' Fancy
- Disc 2, Tracks 3 and 5 from Gimme Back My Bullets (1976)
- Disc 2, Tracks 4 and 6 from the Lynyrd Skynyrd Box Set (1991)
- Disc 2, Tracks 7 and 12 from One More from the Road
- Disc 2, Tracks 8–11 from Street Survivors

==== Live songs ====
- Disc 2, Track 7 recorded live on 7/7/1976 at the Fox Theatre in Atlanta, Georgia
- Disc 2, Track 12 recorded live on 7/8/1976 at the Fox Theatre in Atlanta, Georgia

== Certifications ==
Region	Certification	Certified units/sales
United States (RIAA)	Gold	500,000^{^}
^{^} Shipments figures based on certification alone.
