= What Were You Thinkin' =

Single by Little Texas

from the album First Time for Everything
- B-side: "Just One More Night"
- Released: October 10, 1992
- Genre: Country
- Length: 3:22
- Label: Warner Bros.
- Songwriters: Porter Howell; Dwayne O'Brien; Brady Seals; Christy DiNapoli
- Producers: James Stroud, Christy DiNapoli, Doug Grau

Little Texas singles chronology
"You and Forever and Me" (1992)	"What Were You Thinkin'" (1992)	"I'd Rather Miss You" (1993)

"What Were You Thinkin'" is a song recorded by American country music group Little Texas. It was released in October 1992 as the fourth single from the album First Time for Everything. The song reached #17 on the Billboard Hot Country Singles & Tracks chart. The song was written by Porter Howell, Dwayne O'Brien, Brady Seals and Christy DiNapoli.

== Chart performance ==
Chart (1992–1993)	Peak position
Canada Country Singles (RPM)	21
US Hot Country Songs (Billboard)	17
