= God & Guns =

2009 studio album by Lynyrd Skynyrd

Studio album by Lynyrd Skynyrd
- Released: September 29, 2009
- Recorded: 2008–09
- Studios: Blackbird Studios (Nashville, Tennessee); Studio Sea (Fort Myers, Florida); Sound Kitchen (Franklin, Tennessee)
- Genres: Southern rock; blues rock; country rock; hard rock
- Length: 49:32
- Label: Roadrunner
- Producer: Bob Marlette

Lynyrd Skynyrd chronology
Greatest Hits (2008)	God & Guns (2009)	Live from Freedom Hall (2010)

Professional ratings
Review scores
Source	Rating
Allmusic	3/5 stars
MusicReview	3.5/5 stars

God & Guns is the thirteenth studio album by the southern rock band Lynyrd Skynyrd, released on September 29, 2009.

The single "Still Unbroken" was released on July 27, 2009 followed by another track, "Simple Life", on August 4, 2009. "Still Unbroken" was written after the death of original bassist Leon Wilkeson in 2001. It was the theme song of WWE’s Breaking Point PPV event and is featured on WWE SmackDown vs. Raw 2010.

"God & Guns" was the last Lynyrd Skynyrd album to feature the band's longtime keyboardist Billy Powell, who died in January 2009. Ean Evans, who had replaced Leon Wilkeson on bass, also died before this album came out. The late Hughie Thomasson (Dec. 2007) had contributed to the writing of many songs, but recording did not begin until 2008 and he does not play on the album. This album is the first with guitarist Mark Matejka. The album features guitar work from John 5.

Although neither was present on the album, the CD booklet contains a picture of the group with the two new members: Peter Keys on keyboards and Robert Kearns on bass.

The album's title comes from its eighth track, "God & Guns", written by Mark Stephen Jones, Travis Meadows and Bud Tower, which was later covered by Hank Williams Jr. for his 2016 album It's About Time. The lyrical shift from "Saturday Night Special" to "God & Guns" has been taken into account by band member Johnny Van Zant, who explained how the song was not a direct contradiction to "Saturday Night Special."

God & Guns peaked at #18 on the U.S. Billboard pop charts, the band's highest-charting studio album since 1977's Street Survivors. As of 2012, the album has sold 182,000 copies in the United States.

== Critical reception ==
Robert Christgau gave the album a C+ grade, stating: "'You can take your change on down the road/And leave me here with mine,' Johnny Van Zant begins one of the two songs that take up the title theme after has run through the pleasures of home, the perfidy of woman, and the mixed blessings of the music business for the umpteenth time. Like the wary younger sibling he's always been, Johnny will always hold onto a quarter and settle for what he knows, or thinks he does. Really, he ought to have some inkling that nobody worthy of his trepidation wants to ban hunting, burn the Bible, or slam old Uncle Sam, although actually that no smoking sign means exactly what it says. On the other hand, 'Unwrite That Song' would make a nice B side for Darius Rucker."

== Track listing ==
1. "Still Unbroken" (Rickey Medlocke, Gary Rossington, Hughie Thomasson, Johnny Van Zant) – 5:06
2. "Simple Life" (Medlocke, Rossington, Jeffrey Steele, J. Van Zant, Hughie Thomasson) – 3:17
3. "Little Thing Called You" (John Lowery, Medlocke, Rossington, J. Van Zant) – 3:58
4. "Southern Ways" (Lowery, Bob Marlette, Medlocke) – 3:48
5. "Skynyrd Nation" (Lowery, Marlette, Medlocke, J. Van Zant) – 3:52
6. "Unwrite That Song" (Medlocke, Tony Mullins, Rossington, Steele, J. Van Zant) – 3:50
7. "Floyd" (Lowery, Medlocke, Rossington, J. Van Zant) – 4:03
8. "That Ain't My America" (Medlocke, Rossington, J. Van Zant, Brad Warren, Brett Warren) – 3:44
9. "Comin' Back for More" (Blair Daly, Medlocke, Rossington, J. Van Zant) – 3:28
10. "God & Guns" (Mark Stephen Jones, Travis Meadows, Bud Tower) – 5:44
11. "Storm" (Lowery, Marlette, Medlocke, Rossington, J. Van Zant) – 3:15
12. "Gifted Hands" (Lowery, Marlette, Medlocke, Rossington, J. Van Zant) – 5:22

Special Edition Disc 2

1. "Bang Bang" (Trey Bruce, Medlocke, Rossington, J. Van Zant) – 3:10
2. "Raining in My Heartland" (Bruce, Medlocke, Rossington, J. Van Zant) – 3:54
3. "Hobo Kinda Man" (Bruce, Medlocke, Rossington, J. Van Zant) – 3:53
4. "Red, White, & Blue" (Live) (Donnie Van Zant, J. Van Zant, Brad Warren, Brett Warren) – 5:42
5. "Call Me the Breeze" (Live) (J.J. Cale) – 5:49
6. "Sweet Home Alabama" (Live) (Ed King, Rossington, Ronnie Van Zant) – 6:25
- Live Tracks Recorded 6/15/2007 at the Freedom Hall in Louisville, KY

== Personnel ==
Lynyrd Skynyrd

- Johnny Van Zant – lead vocals, harmonica
- Gary Rossington – guitars
- Rickey Medlocke – guitars, backing vocals, co-lead vocals on "Skynyrd Nation", harmonica
- Mark Matejka – guitars, backing vocals
- Ean Evans – bass, backing vocals
- Michael Cartellone – drums
- Billy Powell – keyboards
- The Honkettes (Dale Krantz-Rossington & Carol Chase) – backing vocals

Additional personnel

- John 5 – guitars
- Rob Zombie – vocals on "Floyd"
- Michael Rhodes – bass
- Greg Morrow – drums
- Perry Coleman – background vocals
- Jerry Douglas – dobro
- Bob Marlette – piano

Strings on "Unwrite That Song" and "Gifted Hands" arranged by Lisa Parade

== Charts ==
Chart (2009)	Peak position
Belgian Albums (Ultratop Wallonia)	91
Dutch Albums (Album Top 100)	79
Finnish Albums (Suomen virallinen lista)	26
French Albums (SNEP)	64
German Albums (Offizielle Top 100)	37
Scottish Albums (Official Charts)	31
Swedish Albums (Sverigetopplistan)	38
Swiss Albums (Schweizer Hitparade)	38
UK Albums (Official Charts)	36
US Billboard 200	18
US Top Rock Albums (Billboard)	9
