= Matt King (singer) =

American country singer-songwriter (born 1966)

- Born: September 28, 1966 (age 58)
- Origin: Asheville, North Carolina, United States
- Genres: Country
- Occupation: Singer-songwriter
- Instrument(s): Vocals, guitar
- Years active: 1997–present
- Labels: Atlantic; Montage; Big Bicycle

Matt King (born September 28, 1966) is an American country singer-songwriter. King was born and raised in Asheville, North Carolina. His mother, a real estate agent, played piano, and his father, a 2018 Inductee into the National Auctioneers Association Hall of Fame who held jobs as an auctioneer, mason, and barber, played bluegrass guitar. Early in his career he was offered a position at Opryland USA after an audition. However, he was deep in debt at the time and had to turn down the offer because he could not afford to move. Some time later, in 1994, he relocated to Nashville, where he recorded demos and played locally. Producer Gary Morris heard him perform and got him an audition with Atlantic Records, who signed him and released his debut in 1997. Soon after he performed at the Grand Ole Opry in a Johnny Russell tribute, with Earl Scruggs, Roy Clark, Ricky Skaggs, and Vince Gill.

== Discography ==
=== Albums ===
| Title | Album details |
|---|---|
| Five O'Clock Hero | Release date: September 16, 1997; Label: Atlantic Records |
| Hard Country | Release date: July 6, 1999; Label: Atlantic Records |
| Rube | Release date: February 5, 2008; Label: Montage Music Group/Big Bicycle |
| Raw | Release date: July 13, 2010; Label: Big Bicycle |
| Matt King and the Cutters | Release date: July 13, 2010; Label: Big Bicycle |

=== Singles ===
| Year | Single | Peak chart positions | | Album |
| Year | Single | US Country | CAN Country | Album |
|---|---|---|---|---|
| 1997 | "A Woman Like You" | 54 | 45 | Five O'Clock Hero |
| 1997 | "I Wrote the Book" | 70 | — | Five O'Clock Hero |
| 1998 | "A Woman's Tears" | 46 | 83 | Five O'Clock Hero |
| 1998 | "Five O'Clock Hero" | — | — | Five O'Clock Hero |
| 1999 | "From Your Knees" | 54 | — | Hard Country |
| 1999 | "Rub It In" | 54 | — | Hard Country |
| 2008 | "Cursing the Ohio" | — | — | Rube |
"—" denotes releases that did not chart

=== Music videos ===
| Year | Video | Director |
|---|---|---|
| 1997 | "A Woman Like You" | Jim Hershleder |
| 1998 | "A Woman's Tears" | Jim Gerik |
| 1998 | "Five O'Clock Hero" | Steven Goldmann |
| 2008 | "Cursing the Ohio" | Traci Goudie |
| 2010 | "Graveyard Shift" | Jose Jones |
