= Ryan Shupe & the RubberBand =

American country music/bluegrass band

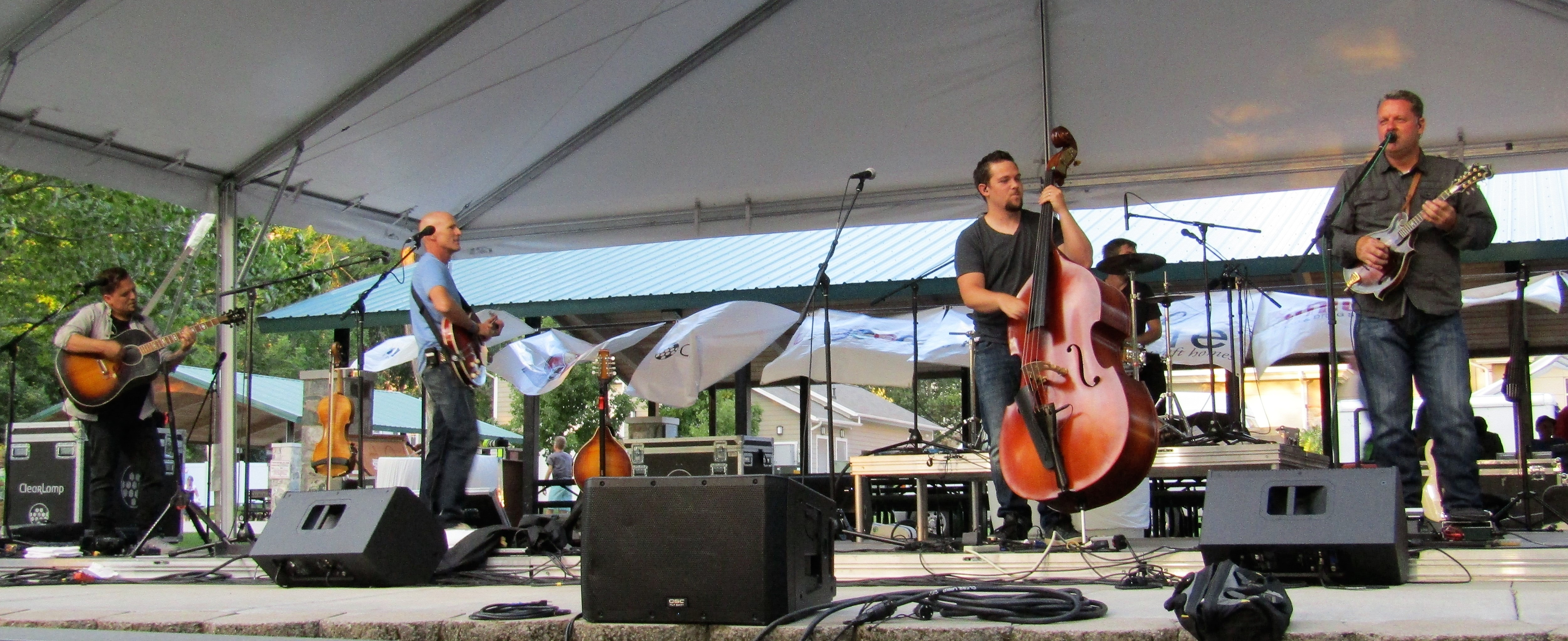
- The band performing at a festival in Farmington, Utah.

Background information
- Origin: Utah, United States
- Genres: Country, bluegrass
- Years active: 1996–present
- Labels: Capitol Nashville, Montage Music Group
- Members: Ryan Shupe; Craig Miner; Roger Archibald; Brandon Chappell; Josh Larsen
- Past members: Bart Olson; Colin Botts; Wally Barnum; Rory Carrera; Jeremy Nielsen; Ryan Tilby; Nate Smeding; Nate Young

Ryan Shupe & the RubberBand is an American country music and bluegrass group from Ogden, Utah, founded in the mid-1990s by Ryan Shupe. After self-releasing four studio albums, they were signed to Capitol Records in 2005 and achieved a Top 40 hit on the U.S. Billboard Hot Country Songs with the single "Dream Big". Over the years, they have released several albums on both major and independent labels, including Last Man Standing (2008), Brand New Shoes (2010), and We Rode On (2016).

After the title track of Dream Big charted in the Top 40, the second single from the album failed to achieve similar success, leading to the band's departure from Capitol Records. In 2008, they signed to Montage Music Group and released the album Last Man Standing. Following its release, the band continued to tour nationally, refining their unique sound.

In 2010, the band self-released the album Brand New Shoes on their independent label. This album featured crowd favorites and highlights the cross-genre, acousti-jam sound they have become known for.

The band’s latest project, We Rode On (released in 2016), marks a shift toward a more rock-oriented direction. To promote the album, they released several music videos, including "The Sun Will Shine Again", "We Rode On", and "Just Say Yes".

== Formation and ideology ==
Ryan Shupe started playing the fiddle at age 5. He played in various musical groups growing up starting with a group of talented 10 yr olds called the "PeeWee Pickers" who toured nationally. His experiences in bands forming and then breaking up led him to the concept of a "rubber band". It would be elastic in members being able to rotate in and out without a name change or breaking a groove. Since their formation they have become one of the most successful musical acts from the state of Utah among other acts such as SHeDAISY, Peter Breinholt, and Neon Trees. The band also made an appearance on the show Extreme Makeover: Home Edition on October 18, 2006, for a family in Logan, Utah.

== Sound ==
Though the band has played in traditionally country venues and festivals all over the United States (such as the Telluride Music Festival and Nashville, TN) their music draws from various influences such as bluegrass and rock as well. They have been described as "a mix between Dave Matthews Band and Dixie Chicks without the political agenda."

== Discography ==
=== Albums ===
| Title | Album details | Peak chart positions | |
| Title | Album details | US Country | US |
|---|---|---|---|
| If I Were a Bird | Release date: 1996; Label: Tydal Wave | — | — |
| Simplify | Release date: 1999; Label: Tydal Wave | — | — |
| Live! | Release date: 2001; Label: Tydal Wave | — | — |
| Hey Hey Hey | Release date: 2003; Label: Tydal Wave | — | — |
| Dream Big (re-issue of Hey Hey Hey) | Release date: September 26, 2005; Label: Capitol Nashville | 13 | 87 |
| Last Man Standing | Release date: May 27, 2008; Label: Montage Music Group | — | — |
| The Gift | Release date: November 18, 2008; Label: Tydal Wave | — | — |
| Brand New Shoes | Release date: May 2010; Label: Tydal Wave | — | — |
| We Rode On | Release date: September 2015; Label: Tydal Wave | — | — |

=== Singles ===
| Year | Single | Peak chart positions | | Album |
| Year | Single | US Country | US Bubbling | Album |
|---|---|---|---|---|
| 2005 | "Dream Big" | 27 | 13 | Dream Big |
| 2006 | "Banjo Boy" | — | — | Dream Big |
| 2008 | "Be the One" | — | — | Last Man Standing |
| 2016 | "We Rode On" | — | — | We Rode On |
| 2016 | "The Sun Will Shine Again" | — | — | We Rode On |
"—" denotes releases that did not chart

=== Music videos ===
| Year | Video | Director |
|---|---|---|
| 2005 | "Dream Big" | Peter Zavadil |
| 2006 | "Banjo Boy" | Peter Zavadil |
| 2008 | "Be the One" | Acosta/Webley |
| 2008 | "10,000 Lakes | |
| 2014 | "We Rode On" | Jesse Ranney/Doug Goodwin |
| 2015 | "The Sun Will Shine Again" | Alvey Productions |
| 2016 | "Just Say Yes" | Jesse Ranney/Doug Goodwin |
| 2017 | "Dream Big (from We Rode On album)" | I.C Media/Danor Gerald |
