= Thompson Street (album) =

Studio album by Brady Seals
- Released: February 25, 2003
- Genre: Country
- Label: Image Entertainment
- Producer: Brady Seals, Andy Sturmer

Brady Seals chronology
Brady Seals (1998)	Thompson Street (2003)	Play Time (2009)

Professional ratings
Review scores
Source	Rating
AllMusic	2.5/5 stars

Thompson Street is the third solo album by American country music singer Brady Seals. It was released in February 2003 via Image Entertainment. No singles were released from it, and after its release, Seals founded the band Hot Apple Pie.

== Track listing ==
1. "Thompson Street" (Brady Seals, Kizzy Plush) – 4:24
2. "Things Have Gotta Change" (Seals, Rodney Crowell) – 3:23
3. "Soon" (Seals, Crowell) – 3:52
4. "Breakin' Down" (Seals) – 3:28
5. "Free Love" (Greg McDowell, Seals) – 3:45
6. "Let Me Be Your Man" (Seals, Lisa Stewart) – 3:14
7. "All I Want" (Seals, McDowell, Joe Rock) – 3:40
8. "That's How It Goes" (McDowell, Seals, Andy Sturmer) – 3:30
9. "10 9 8 7 6 5 4 3 2 1" (Seals) – 3:22
10. "Our Last Goodbye" (Seals, Sturmer) – 3:29

== Personnel ==
- Pat Buchanan - electric guitar
- John Catchings - cello
- Rodney Crowell - acoustic guitar
- David Davidson - violin
- Tommy Harden - drums
- Porter Howell- electric guitar
- Greg McDowell - electric guitar, background vocals
- Rob McNelley - electric guitar
- Mark Matejka - acoustic guitar
- Michael Rhodes - bass guitar
- John Lee Sanders - penny whistle
- Dave Santos - bass guitar
- Brady Seals - drum programming, acoustic guitar, keyboards, mellotron, Hammond organ, piano, Wurlitzer, lead vocals, background vocals
- Steuart Smith - electric guitar, keyboards
- Lisa Stewart - background vocals
- Andy Sturmer - acoustic guitar, background vocals
- Kris Wilkinson - string arrangements, viola
