= Southern Grace =

Single by Little Texas

from the album Kick a Little
- Released: April 29, 1995
- Genre: Country
- Length: 5:43
- Label: Warner Bros.
- Songwriters: Porter Howell, Brady Seals, Stewart Harris
- Producers: Christy DiNapoli, Doug Grau, Little Texas

Little Texas singles chronology
"Amy's Back in Austin" (1995)	"Southern Grace" (1995)	"Life Goes On" (1995)

"Southern Grace" is a song written by Porter Howell, Brady Seals and Stewart Harris, and recorded by American country music group Little Texas. It was released in April 1995 as the third and final single from the album Kick a Little. The song reached #27 on the Billboard Hot Country Singles & Tracks chart, making it the lowest charting single from the album.

== Chart performance ==
Chart (1995)	Peak position
Canada Country Singles (RPM)	18
US Hot Country Songs (Billboard)	27
