= Greatest Hits (Lynyrd Skynyrd album) =

Greatest hits album by Lynyrd Skynyrd
- Released: August 18, 2008
- Recorded: 1973–1977
- Genre: Southern rock
- Length: 76:17
- Label: Island Records (Europe)
- Producer: Al Kooper; Tom Dowd; Lynyrd Skynyrd; Tim Smith; Jimmy R. Johnson; Ron O'Brien

Lynyrd Skynyrd chronology
Thyrty: The 30th Anniversary Collection (2003)	Greatest Hits (2008)	God & Guns (2009)

Greatest Hits is a compilation album by American rock band Lynyrd Skynyrd, released in 2008 in Europe only.

== Track listing ==
1. "Sweet Home Alabama" (Ed King, Gary Rossington, Ronnie Van Zant) – 4:45
2. "Free Bird" (Allen Collins, Van Zant) – 9:08
3. "Saturday Night Special" (King, Van Zant) – 5:08
4. "Gimme Three Steps" (Collins, Van Zant) – 4:26
5. "Double Trouble" (Collins, Van Zant) – 2:48
6. "What's Your Name?" (Rossington, Van Zant) – 3:31
7. "Gimme Back My Bullets" (Rossington, Van Zant) – 3:28
8. "I Ain't the One" (Rossington, Van Zant) – 3:52
9. "Whiskey Rock-a-Roller" (King, Billy Powell, Van Zant) – 4:15
10. "Simple Man" (Rossington, Van Zant) – 5:54
11. "Down South Jukin'" (Rossington, Van Zant) – 2:12
12. "You Got That Right" (Steve Gaines, Van Zant) – 3:46
13. "On the Hunt" (Collins, Van Zant) – 5:25
14. "Workin' for MCA" (King, Van Zant) – 4:43
15. "Tuesday's Gone" (Collins, Van Zant) – 7:28
16. "Call Me the Breeze" (J.J. Cale) – 5:08
- Tracks 1, 14, and 16 from Second Helping (1974)
- Tracks 2, 4, 8, 10, and 15 from (Pronounced 'Lĕh-'nérd 'Skin-'nérd) (1973)
- Tracks 3, 9, and 13 from Nuthin' Fancy (1975)
- Tracks 5 and 7 from Gimme Back My Bullets (1976)
- Tracks 6 and 12 from Street Survivors (1977)
- Track 11 from Skynyrd's First and... Last (1978)

== Charts ==
Chart (2008–09)	Peak position
Norwegian Albums (VG-lista)	29
UK Albums (OCC)	16

== Certifications ==
Region	Certification	Certified units/sales
United Kingdom (BPI)	Gold	100,000^{‡}
^{‡} Sales+streaming figures based on certification alone.
