= Stop on a Dime =

Single by Little Texas

from the album Big Time
- Released: May 9, 1994
- Genre: Country
- Length: 3:05
- Label: Warner Bros. Nashville 18385
- Songwriters: Porter Howell, Dwayne O'Brien, Brady Seals
- Producers: James Stroud, Christy Dinapoli, Doug Grau

Little Texas singles chronology
"My Love" (1994)	"Stop on a Dime" (1994)	"Kick a Little" (1994)

"Stop on a Dime" is a song recorded by American country music group Little Texas. It was released in May 1994 as the fourth and final single from their second album Big Time. It was written by the band's lead guitarist Porter Howell, keyboardist and vocalist Brady Seals, and rhythm guitarist Dwayne O'Brien. The song reached number 14 on the Billboard Hot Country Songs chart. It also peaked at number 13 on the Canadian RPM Country Tracks chart. Before its release, it was the B-side to the band's single "What Might Have Been".

== Content ==
The song is an uptempo that discusses the perils of falling in love.

== Critical reception ==
Deborah Evans Price, of Billboard magazine reviewed the song favorably, calling it a "rip-roaring tune." She goes on to say that the "picking is slick and the harmonies are Texas-tight."

== Chart performance ==
"Stop on a Dime" debuted at number 66 on the U.S. Billboard Hot Country Singles & Tracks for the week of May 21, 1994.

Chart (1994)	Peak position
Canada Country Singles (RPM)	13
US Hot Country Songs (Billboard)	14
