= Hot Apple Pie =

American country music band

- Origin: Nashville, Tennessee, U.S.
- Genres: Country
- Years active: 2002–2008
- Labels: DreamWorks Nashville, MCA Nashville
- Spinoff of: Little Texas
- Past members: Keith Horne; Trey Landry; Mark Matejka; Brady Seals; Kevin Ray

Hot Apple Pie was an American country music band founded in 2002. The band consisted of Brady Seals (lead vocals, keyboards), Keith Horne (bass guitar), Trey Landry (drums), and Mark Matejka (guitar). Matejka was replaced in 2006 by Kevin Ray. Seals was initially co-lead vocalist and keyboardist of Little Texas until 1994. Signed to DreamWorks Records Nashville in 2005, Hot Apple Pie released its self-titled debut album that year. This album produced three chart singles on the Billboard Hot Country Songs charts, including the No. 26-peaking "Hillbillies."

== History ==
Brady Seals was a keyboardist and co-lead vocalist (alongside Tim Rushlow) in the country band Little Texas until late 1994, when he left in pursuit of a solo career. Between then and the early 2000s, Seals recorded three albums, and charted six singles on the country charts.

After deciding that his solo career was not proving successful, Seals opted to form a second band. Guitarist Mark "Sparky" Matejka and drummer Trey Landry, both of whom had backed Seals during his solo career, were recruited, with bass guitarist Keith Horne completing the lineup. These three musicians all had experience prior to the band's foundation. Matejka had played for Sons of the Desert and Charlie Daniels; Landry, for Rodney Crowell and Suzy Bogguss; and Horne, for Waylon Jennings.

In 2005, Hot Apple Pie signed to DreamWorks Records' Nashville division. That year, they released its debut album, also entitled Hot Apple Pie. It produced three singles, all of which charted on the Billboard Hot Country Songs charts: "Hillbillies", "We're Makin' Up" and "Easy Does It." Due to the dissolution of DreamWorks Records in late 2005, these latter two singles were issued on MCA Nashville. The band exited this label in 2006, the same year that Matejka left to join the Southern rock band Lynyrd Skynyrd. Kevin Ray took Matejka's place in 2006. Seals released another solo album in mid-2009.

== Discography ==
=== Studio albums ===
Title	Album details	Peak chart positions	
Title	Album details	US Country	US
Hot Apple Pie	Release date: June 28, 2005; Label: DreamWorks Nashville	6	60

=== Singles ===
Year	Single	Peak chart positions		Album
Year	Single	US Country	US Bubbling	Album
2005	"Hillbillies"	26	22	Hot Apple Pie
2005	"We're Makin' Up"	54	—	Hot Apple Pie
2006	"Easy Does It"	50	—	Hot Apple Pie
"—" denotes releases that did not chart

=== Music videos ===
Year	Video	Director
2005	"Hillbillies"	Philip Andelman
2005	"We're Makin' Up"	Philip Andelman
2006	"Easy Does It"	Philip Andelman
