= First Time for Everything =

First Time For Everything

Studio album by Little Texas
- Released: March 3, 1992
- Recorded: 1990–1991
- Studio: Ardent (Memphis, Tennessee); Eleven Eleven (Nashville, Tennessee); Javelina (Nashville, Tennessee); Masterfonics (Nashville, Tennessee); Scruggs Sound (Berry Hill, Tennessee); Treasure Isle (Nashville, Tennessee)
- Genre: Country
- Length: 33:02
- Label: Warner Bros.
- Producer: Christy DiNapoli; Doug Grau; James Stroud

Little Texas chronology
First Time For Everything (1992)	Big Time (1993)

Singles from First Time for Everything
- 1. "Some Guys Have All the Love" Released: September 1991; 2. "First Time for Everything" Released: February 3, 1992; 3. "You and Forever and Me" Released: June 8, 1992; 4. "What Were You Thinkin'" Released: October 10, 1992; 5. "I'd Rather Miss You" Released: January 18, 1993

Professional ratings
Review scores
Source	Rating
AllMusic	2/5 stars
Entertainment Weekly	C−

First Time for Everything is the debut studio album by American country music band Little Texas. Released in 1992 on Warner Bros. Records, the album was certified gold by the RIAA for sales of 500,000 copies. Five singles were released from it: "Some Guys Have All the Love", the title track, "You and Forever and Me", "What Were You Thinkin'", and "I'd Rather Miss You". Respectively, these reached Nos. 8, 13, 5, 17 and 16 on the Hot Country Songs charts.

== Track listing ==
No.	Title	Writer(s)	Length
1.	"Some Guys Have All the Love"	Porter Howell; Dwayne O'Brien	2:52
2.	"First Time for Everything"	Howell; O'Brien	4:01
3.	"Down in the Valley"	Brady Seals	2:00
4.	"You and Forever and Me"	Howell; Stewart Harris	3:44
5.	"What Were You Thinkin'"	Howell; O'Brien; Seals; Christy DiNapoli	3:23
6.	"Dance"	Howell; O'Brien	2:58
7.	"Better Way"	Seals; Tommy Barnes	3:36
8.	"I'd Rather Miss You"	Howell; O'Brien	3:58
9.	"Just One More Night"	Howell; O'Brien	3:32
10.	"Cry On"	Howell; O'Brien; Seals	3:07
Total length:			33:11

== Personnel ==
=== Little Texas ===
- Del Gray - drums
- Porter Howell - electric guitar, slide guitar, acoustic guitar, 6 string bass, background vocals
- Dwayne O'Brien - acoustic guitar, background vocals
- Duane Propes - bass guitar, background vocals
- Tim Rushlow - lead vocals
- Brady Seals - piano, keyboards, Hammond organ, lead vocals, background vocals

=== Additional Musicians ===
- Larry Byrom - acoustic guitar on "Some Guys Have All the Love"
- Sonny Garrish - steel guitar
- Dann Huff - electric guitar
- Brent Rowan - electric guitar
- James Stroud - percussion

Track information and credits verified from the album's liner notes.

== Charts ==
=== Album ===
Chart (1992)	Peak position
US Top Country Albums (Billboard)	19
US Billboard 200	99
Canadian RPM Country Albums	17

=== Singles ===
Title	Date	Chart	Peak position
"Some Guys Have All the Love"	December 6, 1991	US Hot Country Songs (Billboard)	8
"First Time for Everything"	May 15, 1992	US Hot Country Songs (Billboard)	13
"You and Forever and Me"	September 18, 1992	US Hot Country Songs (Billboard)	5
"What Were You Thinkin'"	January 8, 1993	US Hot Country Songs (Billboard)	17
"I'd Rather Miss You"	April 30, 1993	US Hot Country Songs (Billboard)	16
