= Big Time (Little Texas album) =

Studio album by Little Texas
- Released: May 11, 1993
- Recorded: 1992–1993
- Studio: Ardent Studios, Crosstown Studios, and Studio 6 Memphis, TN Masterfonics, Mesa Studios, Scruggs Sound Studio, and Treasure Isle Nashville, TN
- Genre: Country
- Length: 37:38
- Label: Warner Bros. Nashville
- Producer: Doug Grau; Christy DiNapoli; James Stroud

Little Texas chronology
First Time for Everything (1992)	Big Time (1993)	Kick a Little (1994)

Singles from Big Time
- 1. "What Might Have Been" Released: May 13, 1993; 2. "God Blessed Texas" Released: July 17, 1993; 3. "My Love" Released: January 13, 1994; 4. "Stop on a Dime" Released: May 9, 1994

Professional ratings
Review scores
Source	Rating
Entertainment Weekly	C−

Big Time is the second studio album by American country music band Little Texas. The band's breakthrough album, it was released in 1993 on Warner Bros. Records, and produced the singles "What Might Have Been", "God Blessed Texas", "My Love", and "Stop on a Dime". Respectively, these peaked at numbers 2, 4, 1, and 14 on the Hot Country Songs charts. "What Might Have Been" was also a crossover hit, reaching 16 on the Hot Adult Contemporary Tracks charts.

The album is also the band's highest certified album, having been certified 2× Platinum by the RIAA.

== Track listing ==
No.	Title	Writer(s)	Length
1.	"Forget About Forgetting You"	Porter Howell, Dwayne O'Brien, Brady Seals, Tommy Barnes	3:09
2.	"Only Thing I'm Sure Of"	Howell, O'Brien, B. Seals	3:25
3.	"What Might Have Been"	Howell, O'Brien, B. Seals	3:58
4.	"My Love"	Howell, B. Seals, Barnes	4:05
5.	"Stop on a Dime"	Howell, O'Brien, B. Seals	3:05
6.	"God Blessed Texas"	Howell, B. Seals	4:05
7.	"Love and Learn"	Howell, O'Brien	3:54
8.	"My Town"	Michael Stanley	4:21
9.	"This Time It's Real"	Howell, O'Brien, B. Seals	4:01
10.	"Cutoff Jeans"	Troy Seals, B. Seals, Ronnie Samoset	3:35

== Personnel ==
As listed in liner notes.

=== Little Texas ===
- Del Gray – drums
- Porter Howell – slide guitar, acoustic guitar, electric guitar, six-string bass guitar, sitar, background vocals
- Dwayne O'Brien – acoustic guitar, background vocals
- Duane Propes – bass guitar, upright bass, background vocals
- Tim Rushlow – lead vocals, background vocals, acoustic guitar
- Brady Seals – piano, keyboards, Hammond B-3 organ, lead vocals, background vocals

=== Additional Musicians ===
- Sam Bacco – percussion
- Dennis Burnside – string arrangements, conductor
- Carl Gorodetzky – concert master
- The Nashville String Machine – strings
- Troy Seals – acoustic guitar and rap on "Cutoff Jeans"

== Chart performance ==
Chart (1993)	Peak position
U.S. Billboard Top Country Albums	6
U.S. Billboard 200	55
Canadian RPM Country Albums	8
