= Another You, Another Me =

Single by Brady Seals

from the album The Truth
- B-side: "You Can Have Your Way with Me"
- Released: September 7, 1996
- Genre: Country
- Length: 3:56
- Label: Reprise
- Songwriters: Troy Seals, Will Jennings
- Producers: Rodney Crowell, Brady Seals

Brady Seals singles chronology
"Another You, Another Me" (1996)	"Still Standing Tall" (1997)

"Another You, Another Me" is the debut solo song recorded by American country music artist Brady Seals. It was released in September 1996 as the first single from the album The Truth. The song reached No. 32 on the Billboard Hot Country Singles & Tracks chart. The song was written by Seals' uncle, Troy Seals, along with Will Jennings.

== Content ==
The song is a country pop ballad, described by Wendy Newcomer of Cash Box magazine as having a sound similar to England Dan & John Ford Coley. It features a harmony vocal from Wynonna Judd.

== Music video ==
The music video was directed by Gary Wenner, and premiered in late 1996.

== Chart performance ==
Chart (1996)	Peak position
US Hot Country Songs (Billboard)	32
US Billboard Hot 100	91
Canadian RPM Country Tracks	42
