= Dream Big (Ryan Shupe & the RubberBand album) =

Studio album by Ryan Shupe & The RubberBand
- Released: September 26, 2005
- Genre: Bluegrass
- Label: SunDive Productions; Capitol Nashville
- Producer: Jason Deere

Ryan Shupe & The RubberBand chronology
Live! (2002)	Dream Big (2005)	Last Man Standing (2008)

Hey Hey Hey cover

Professional ratings
Review scores
Source	Rating
About.com	05/05 stars
Allmusic	04/05 stars

Dream Big is Ryan Shupe & The RubberBand's third album, independently released in 2003 under the title Hey Hey Hey. It featured four tracks that had debuted on the band's first two albums but re-recorded as well as eight brand new songs. A similar track listing became available as the band's major label debut under the title "Dream Big" when the band signed a record deal with Capitol Nashville. Dream Big is missing the track "She's Bad For Me" and does not contain the hidden track "Corn Dogs" from Hey Hey Hey. "Corn Dogs" has since been officially released as the closing track on the band's album Last Man Standing.

The song "Dream Big", the band's only chart single, was also featured in advertisements for the NBC reality show Three Wishes, which was hosted by Amy Grant.

== Dream Big track listing ==
All songs written by Ryan Shupe.

1. "Banjo Boy" (03:31)
2. "Even Superman" (03:35)
3. "Dream Big" (03:36)
4. "Simplify" (03:26)
5. "Would You Love Me" (03:55)
6. "Ambush" [Instrumental] (02:46)
7. "New Emotion" (03:21)
8. "Rain Falls Down" (03:53)
9. "Never Give Up" (03:01)
10. "Oh How I Miss You" (03:12)
11. "Hey Hey Hey" (02:11)

== Hey Hey Hey track listing ==
1. "Banjo Boy" (03:29)
2. "Even Superman" (03:37)
3. "Dream Big" (03:36)
4. "Simplify" (03:28)
5. "Would You Love Me" (03:55)
6. "Ambush" (02:47)
7. "New Emotion" (03:23)
8. "Rain Falls Down" (03:43)
9. "Never Give Up" (03:03)
10. "She's Bad For Me" (03:16)
11. "Oh How I Miss You" (03:14)
12. "Hey Hey Hey" (02:12)
  - features the hidden track "Corn Dogs"

== Chart performance ==
Chart (2005)	Peak position
U.S. Billboard Top Country Albums	13
U.S. Billboard 200	87

== Personnel (Dream Big) ==
=== Ryan Shupe & the RubberBand ===
- Ryan Shupe — fiddle, mandolin, lead vocals
- Craig Miner — banjo, mandolin, bouzouki, Dobro, vocals
- Roger Archbald — guitar, vocals
- Colin Botts — bass, Hammond B3, pandeiro, vocals
- Bart Olson — drums, percussion, vocals

=== Additional musicians ===
- Nathan Botts — trumpet, piccolo trumpet
- David Halliday — tenor saxophone
- Silvo Richetto — programming
