= God Blessed Texas =

Single by Little Texas

from the album Big Time
- B-side: "Cut Off Jeans"
- Released: July 17, 1993
- Recorded: 1993
- Genre: Country rock
- Length: 3:27 (radio edit); 4:05 (album version)
- Label: Warner Bros. Nashville 18385
- Songwriters: Porter Howell, Brady Seals
- Producers: James Stroud, Christy Dinapoli, Doug Grau

Little Texas singles chronology
"What Might Have Been" (1993)	"God Blessed Texas" (1993)	"My Love" (1994)

"God Blessed Texas" is a song recorded by American country music group Little Texas. It was released on July 17, 1993, as the second single from their second album Big Time. The song was their seventh single overall. It was written by the band's lead guitarist Porter Howell, and keyboardist and vocalist Brady Seals. The song reached No. 4 on the U.S. Billboard Hot Country Songs chart in December of that year. It also peaked at No. 55 on the Billboard Hot 100, their most successful song on that chart. It is the band's signature song, and they close out their concerts with it.

== Content ==
The song, with lead vocals by Tim Rushlow, celebrates Texas pride by saying that God must have evidently given the state special attention and furthermore provided the state its unique and legendary geography and demography. The album version contains an intro of which the band performs a preparation piece that includes a brief sample of the song, "The Eyes of Texas", before subsequently leading into the main song. This intro was omitted from the radio version, which was used for the music video, as well as the opening track on the band's greatest-hits compilation.

== Music video ==
The music video, directed by Gerry Wenner, takes place at a pool party with many bikini-clad women. It was shot at Southfork Ranch in Dallas, Texas. The Dallas Cowboys Cheerleaders also appear in this video.

== In popular culture ==
The song can be heard at many sports venues, especially prevalent in the state of Texas; these venues include Dallas Cowboys and Texas Rangers games. The song is used by the Ford Motor Company in radio and TV advertisements in several Texas cities (Houston, Dallas/Fort Worth, San Antonio, Austin, and El Paso) where "Ford is the Best in Texas" is substituted for the "God Blessed Texas" line. The song can also be heard in various sections of the amusement park Six Flags Over Texas in Arlington, Texas. The song was also used in an episode of the second season of True Blood. Joe Jonas performed the song in an episode of the second season of The Righteous Gemstones.

== Chart performance ==
"God Blessed Texas" debuted at number 75 on the U.S. Billboard Hot Country Singles & Tracks for the week of July 17, 1993.

Chart (1993)	Peak position
US Billboard Hot 100	55
US Hot Country Songs (Billboard)	4
