= Little Texas (album) =

Studio album by Little Texas
- Released: April 22, 1997
- Genre: Country
- Length: 34:09
- Label: Warner Bros. Nashville
- Producer: Christy DiNapoli; Doug Grau; James Stroud

Little Texas chronology
Greatest Hits (1995)	Little Texas (1997)	The Very Best of Little Texas: Live and Loud (2007)

Professional ratings
Review scores
Source	Rating
AllMusic	4/5 stars
Country Standard Time	

Little Texas is the fourth studio album by the country music group Little Texas, released in 1997. It was their last album for Warner Bros. Records. "Bad for Us", "Your Mama Won't Let Me" and "The Call" were released as singles from the album, peaking at numbers 45, 64 and 71, respectively, on the Billboard country singles chart, making this the first album of Little Texas' career not to produce any top 40 country hits.

This is the only album to feature Jeff Huskins on keyboards as Huskins replaced former keyboardist/co-lead vocalist Brady Seals, who had departed for a solo career in late 1994. In addition, it is the last album to feature lead vocalist Tim Rushlow. After Little Texas disbanded at the end of 1997, Rushlow departed for a solo career. Gray, Howell, O'Brien, and Propes re-established the band seven years later, with Steven Troy briefly serving as lead vocalist.

== Track listing ==
1. "Loud and Proud" (Porter Howell, Sam Gay) - 3:31
2. "Bad for Us" (Howell, Dwayne O'Brien, Tom Shapiro) - 3:14
3. "Ain't No Time to Be Afraid" (Howell, Allen Shamblin) - 4:00
4. "Long Way Down" (Bob DiPiero, Howell, O'Brien) - 2:54
5. "Your Mama Won't Let Me" (Del Gray, Thom McHugh, Keith Follesé) - 3:00
6. "All in the Line of Love" (Howell, O'Brien, Stephen Allen Davis) - 3:35
7. "Living in a Bullseye" (Walt Aldridge, DiPiero) - 3:10
8. "The Call" (Aldridge, Tim Rushlow) - 4:22
9. "Yesterday's Gone Forever" (O'Brien, Jim Rushing) - 3:23
10. "If I Don't Get Enough of You" (Howell, Chuck Jones) - 3:00

== Personnel ==
=== Little Texas ===
- Del Gray – drums
- Porter Howell – acoustic guitar, electric guitar, slide guitar, 6-string bass guitar
- Jeff Huskins – keyboards, synthesizer, fiddle, mandolin, piano, background vocals
- Dwayne O'Brien – acoustic guitar, lead vocals, background vocals
- Duane Propes – bass guitar, background vocals
- Tim Rushlow – lead vocals, background vocals

=== Additional musicians ===
- Dan Dugmore – pedal steel guitar
- Sonny Garrish – pedal steel guitar

== Charts ==
Chart (1997)	Peak position
U.S. Billboard Top Country Albums	47
