= Hot Apple Pie (album) =

Studio album by Hot Apple Pie
- Released: June 28, 2005
- Recorded: July 2003–February 2005
- Genre: Country
- Label: DreamWorks Nashville
- Producer: Richard Landis

Professional ratings
Review scores
Source	Rating
Allmusic	link
Country Standard Time	favorable link
Slant Magazine	link

Hot Apple Pie is the only studio album by American country music band Hot Apple Pie. It was released June 28, 2005 on DreamWorks Records Nashville. The tracks "Hillbillies", "We're Makin' Up" and "Easy Does It" were all released as singles, respectively reaching numbers 26, 54, and 50 on the Billboard Hot Country Songs charts. Due to the dissolution of the DreamWorks label in late 2005, the latter two singles were issued on MCA Nashville. "The Shape I'm In" is a cover of a song originally recorded by The Band, while "We're Makin' Up" was previously recorded by Jeffrey Steele on his 2002 album Somethin' in the Water.

== Track listing ==
No.	Title	Writer(s)	Length
1.	"Hillbillies"	Kizzy Plush, Greg McDowell, Brady Seals	3:20
2.	"We're Makin' Up"	Al Anderson, Jeffrey Steele	2:52
3.	"California King"	Plush, Seals	3:55
4.	"Easy Does It"	Andrew Dorff, Plush	3:55
5.	"The Good Life"	Michael Dulaney, Steven Dale Jones, Jason Sellers	3:01
6.	"Why Can't I Get to You"	Mike Reid, B. Seals	3:53
7.	"The Shape I'm In"	Robbie Robertson	3:50
8.	"Slowin' Down the Fall" (featuring Willie Nelson)	Gordon Bradberry, B. Seals, Troy Seals	4:03
9.	"Redneck Revolution"	Plush, B. Seals, T. Seals	4:17
10.	"Annabelle (Arkansas Is Callin' You)"	Rodney Crowell, B. Seals	4:07
11.	"Everybody Wants to Dance with My Baby"	Plush, B. Seals	3:24
12.	"I Should've Seen Her Leavin' Comin'"	B. Seals	2:40
13.	"All Together Now"	Dennis Robbins, B. Seals, T. Seals	4:08

== Personnel ==
=== Hot Apple Pie ===
- Keith Horne – bass guitar, acoustic guitar, background vocals
- Trey Landry – drums, percussion
- Mark "Sparky" Matejka – banjo, electric guitar, background vocals
- Brady Seals – lead vocals, harmonica, accordion, acoustic guitar, keyboards

=== Additional musicians ===
- Dan Dugmore – steel guitar
- Paul Franklin – steel guitar
- Nashville String Machine – string section

- Carl Gorodetzky – concert master
- Jim Gray – string arrangements

== Chart performance ==
Chart (2005)	Peak position
U.S. Billboard Top Country Albums	6
U.S. Billboard 200	60
