= Life Goes On (Little Texas song) =

Single by Little Texas

from the album Greatest Hits
- B-side: "Peaceful Easy Feeling"
- Released: August 21, 1995
- Genre: Country
- Length: 2:39
- Label: Warner Bros. Nashville
- Songwriters: Del Gray, Thom McHugh, Keith Follesé
- Producers: Christy Dinapoli, Doug Grau, James Stroud

Little Texas singles chronology
"Southern Grace" (1995)	"Life Goes On" (1995)	"Country Crazy" (1996)

"Life Goes On" is a song recorded by American country music group Little Texas. It was released in August 1995 as the first single from the band's Greatest Hits compilation album. The song was co-written by the band's drummer, Del Gray and songwriters Thom McHugh and Keith Follesé. Life Goes On was Little Texas's thirteenth entry on the Billboard charts, peaking at #5 on the Hot Country Songs chart and reaching #4 on Canada's RPM country tracks chart. It would be their last single to make it to the Top 40.

== Content ==
"Life Goes On" is an uptempo song in the band's characteristic harmonizing style. The song's lyrics are simple in that the narrator remembers a lost love and basically sums up his feelings with "I miss ya honey but life goes on."

== Music video ==
The music video was directed by Gerry Wenner and premiered in September 1995. It was filmed on August 8, 1995, and features the band playing the song at a bar with a pool table, while clips from their previous music videos are shown.

== Chart performance ==
"Life Goes On" debuted at #59 on the U.S. Billboard Hot Country Singles & Tracks for the week of September 2, 1995.

Chart (1995)	Peak position
Canada Country Singles (RPM)	4
US Hot Country Songs (Billboard)	5

=== Year-end charts ===
Chart (1995)	Position
Canada Country Tracks (RPM)	49
