= Kick a Little =

Kick A Little

Studio album by Little Texas
- Released: September 27, 1994
- Genre: Country
- Length: 38:34
- Label: Warner Bros.
- Producer: Christy DiNapoli; Doug Grau; Little Texas

Little Texas chronology
| Big Time (1993) | Kick A Little (1994) | Greatest Hits (1995) |

Singles from Kick a Little
- 1. "Kick a Little" Released: August 16, 1994; 2. "Amy's Back in Austin" Released: December 24, 1994; 3. "Southern Grace" Released: April 29, 1995

Professional ratings
Review scores
| Source | Rating |
|---|---|
| Allmusic | 4/5 stars |

Kick a Little is the third studio album by American country music band Little Texas. Released in 1994 on Warner Bros. Records, it was certified platinum by the RIAA for sales of one million copies. Three singles were released from this album: the title track, "Amy's Back in Austin" and "Southern Grace"; respectively, these reached #5, #4, and #27 on the Hot Country Songs charts. This was also the band's last album to feature keyboardist and co-lead vocalist Brady Seals, who left later that year to pursue a solo career, prior to the band's tour to promote the album.

== Track listing ==
| No. | Title | Writer(s) | Length |
|---|---|---|---|
| 1. | "Kick a Little" | Porter Howell, Dwayne O'Brien, Brady Seals | 3:42 |
| 2. | "I'd Hold On to Her" | Howell, O'Brien, Seals | 3:05 |
| 3. | "Amy's Back in Austin" | Seals, Stephen Allen Davis | 4:35 |
| 4. | "Southern Grace" | Stewart Harris, Howell, Seals | 5:43 |
| 5. | "She's Cool" | Pat McLaughlin, Seals | 3:08 |
| 6. | "Your Days Are Numbered" | Howell, O'Brien | 3:30 |
| 7. | "Inside" | Howell, Seals, Ralph Murthy | 3:26 |
| 8. | "A Night I'll Never Remember" | Howell, Seals, Davis | 3:41 |
| 9. | "Hit Country Song" | Howell, O'Brien, Seals, Del Gray, Duane Propes, Tim Rushlow | 3:01 |
| 10. | "Redneck Like Me" | Jay Booker | 4:43 |

== Personnel ==
Little Texas

- Del Gray – drums
- Porter Howell – slide guitar, electric guitar, acoustic guitar, six-string bass guitar, steel guitar, background vocals
- Dwayne O'Brien – acoustic guitar, lead vocals, background vocals
- Duane Propes – bass guitar, background vocals
- Tim Rushlow – acoustic guitar, lead vocals, background vocals
- Brady Seals – piano, keyboards, Hammond B-3 organ, electric guitar, lead vocals, background vocals

Additional musicians

- Robert Bailey, Kim Fleming, and Donna McElroy – background vocals (tracks 4, 5)
- Mark Casstevens – harmonica (track 9)
- Luis Conte – percussion (tracks 1–8)
- Paul Franklin – pedal steel guitar (tracks 6, 9, 10), Dobro (track 7)
- Rob Hajacos – fiddle (tracks 3, 9)
- Bob Mason – cello (track 4)
- Pat McLaughlin – acoustic guitar (track 5)
- Jay Spell – accordion (track 3)

Technical

- Christy DiNapoli – production
- Doug Grau – production
- John Hampton – recording, mixing
- Bob Ludwig – mastering
- Little Texas – production

== Charts ==
=== Weekly charts ===
| Chart (1994–1995) | Peak position |
|---|---|
| Canadian Country Albums (RPM) | 8 |
| US Billboard 200 | 51 |
| US Top Country Albums (Billboard) | 10 |

=== Year-end charts ===
| Chart (1995) | Position |
|---|---|
| US Top Country Albums (Billboard) | 44 |
