= First Time for Everything (song) =

Single by Little Texas

from the album First Time for Everything
- B-side: "Some Guys Have All The Love"
- Released: February 3, 1992
- Genre: Country
- Length: 3:58
- Label: Warner Bros. Nashville 18867
- Songwriters: Porter Howell; Dwayne O'Brien
- Producers: Christy DiNapoli; Doug Grau; James Stroud

Little Texas singles chronology
"Some Guys Have All the Love" (1991)	"First Time for Everything" (1992)	"You and Forever and Me" (1992)

"First Time for Everything" is a song recorded by American country music group Little Texas. It was released in February 1992 as the second single and title track from their debut album First Time for Everything. It was written by the band's lead guitarist Porter Howell and rhythm guitarist Dwayne O'Brien. The song peaked at number 13 on the Billboards Hot Country Songs chart and reached number 18 on the Canadian RPM country Tracks chart in 1992.

== Music video ==
The music video was directed by Charles Randazzo and premiered in early 1992.

== Chart performance ==
"First Time for Everything" debuted on the U.S. Billboard Hot Country Singles & Tracks for the week of February 15, 1992.

Chart (1992)	Peak position
Canada Country Singles (RPM)	18
US Hot Country Songs (Billboard)	13
