= What Might Have Been =

Single by Little Texas

from the album Big Time
- B-side: "Stop on a Dime"
- Released: May 13, 1993
- Recorded: 1992 in Nashville, Tennessee
- Genre: Country
- Length: 3:58
- Label: Warner Bros. Nashville 18516
- Songwriters: Dwayne O'Brien; Porter Howell; Brady Seals
- Producers: James Stroud, Christy Dinapoli, Doug Grau

Little Texas singles chronology
"I'd Rather Miss You" (1993)	"What Might Have Been" (1993)	"God Blessed Texas" (1993)

"What Might Have Been" is a song recorded by American country music group Little Texas. It was released in May 1993 as the lead-off single from their second (and breakthrough) album, Big Time (1993). It was written by the band's lead guitarist Porter Howell, rhythm guitarist Dwayne O'Brien, and keyboardist and vocalist Brady Seals. The song reached number two on the US Billboard Hot Country Songs chart, behind Sawyer Brown's "Thank God for You", and number 11 on the Canadian RPM country Tracks chart in 1993. It is one of their best known songs, and also peaked at numbers 74 and 78 on the Billboard Hot 100 and Cash Box Top 100 charts, and number 16 on the Billboard Hot Adult Contemporary Tracks chart.

== Content ==
The song "What Might Have Been" is a lament about a relationship that didn't work out. The narrator tells his former romantic interest that he can't change the past, and that there is no way to know what their relationship could have become.

== Music video ==
The song "What Might Have Been" has two music videos, both directed by Jack Cole. The first version is filmed entirely in sepia tone. It focuses on World War II and shows a couple dancing just before the man has to go off to war. Old stock footage from the war is also shown.

The second version of "What Might Have Been" premiered on CMT on May 16, 1993. In this version, Michael brings his son, Tommy, to visit Michael's grandfather, Nathan, who lives in a nursing home. Tommy had found a photograph of his great-grandfather, Nathan, with a woman he met during World War II, named Clarice. He took the photo to Nathan and showed it to him. Nathan and Michael visit Clarice. During the visit, Nathan tells Michael various stories about Clarice. He also tells Michael that he and Clarice lost contact with each other after the war ended. After Michael and Tommy leave, Nathan is walking through the nursing home hallways when he passes an elderly woman. He notices that she is sitting on a bench, staring at the wall. Clarice was a long lost love of his. One day, he was walking down when he suddenly stopped and turned around. He thought he saw someone who looked familiar. It turned out to be Clarice. As Clarice and Nathan reunite, the video then flashes back to show them as younger versions of themselves sharing a kiss. The video for "What Might Have Been" is a series of scenes set during World War II. It shows a couple dancing before the man goes off to war. The video then cuts to old stock footage from the war, with the band performing throughout the video. This version of "What Might Have Been" has been played on CMT, TNN, and GAC, as well as CMT's sister channel, Pure Country. It is a popular song that has been covered by many artists.

== Charts ==
"What Might Have Been" debuted at number 72 on the US Billboard Hot Country Singles & Tracks for the week of May 29, 1993.

=== Weekly charts ===
Chart (1993–1994)	Peak position
Canada Country Singles (RPM)	11
US Billboard Hot 100	74
US Adult Contemporary (Billboard)	16
US Hot Country Songs (Billboard)	2
US Cash Box Top 100	78

=== Year-end charts ===
Chart (1993)	Position
US Country Songs (Billboard)	23
Chart (1994)	Position
US Adult Contemporary (Billboard)	35
