= Little Texas =

American country music band

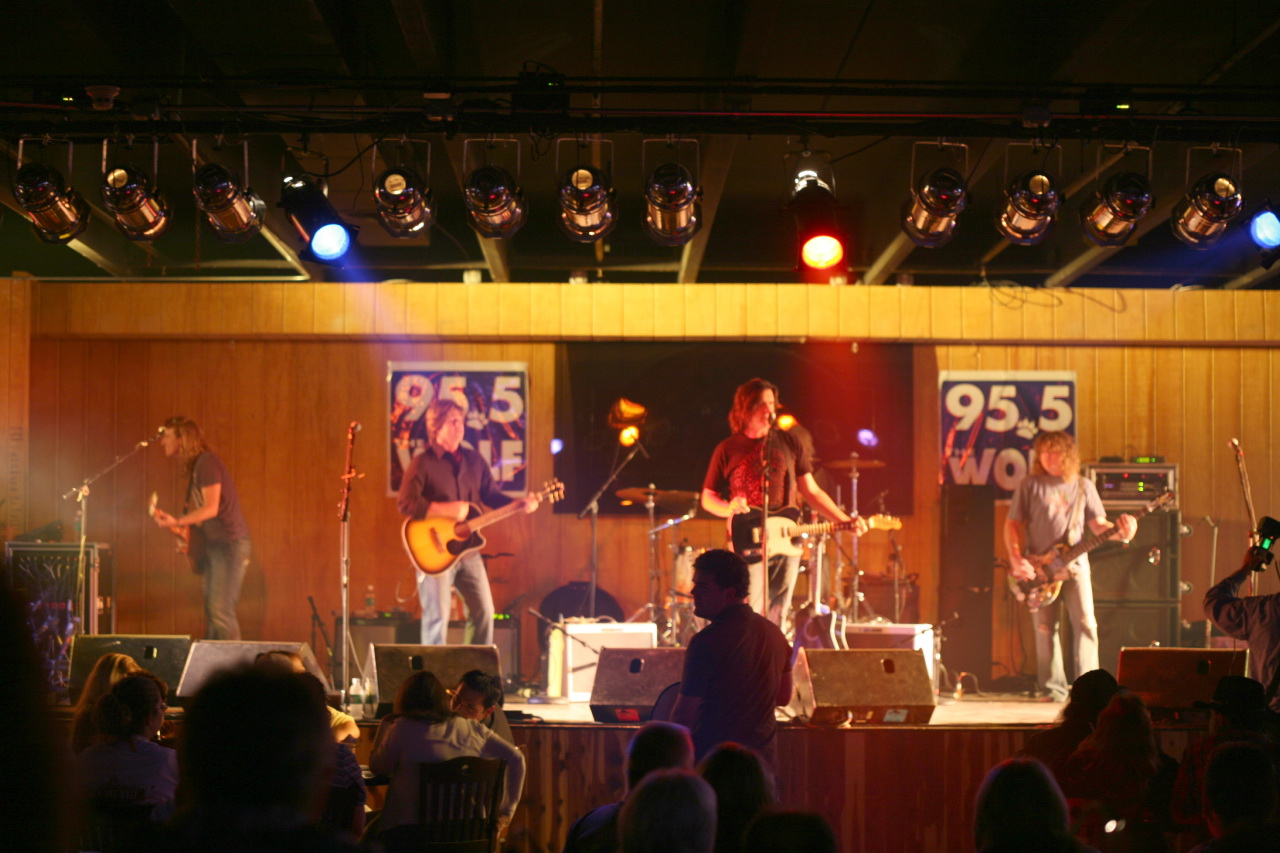
- Little Texas performing in 2007

Background information
- Origin: Nashville, Tennessee, U.S.
- Genres: Country; country rock
- Years active: 1988–1997; 2004–present
- Labels: Warner Nashville; Montage Music Group; Cleopatra
- Spinoffs: Rushlow; Rushlow Harris; Hilljack; Hot Apple Pie; The Frontmen
- Members: Del Gray; Porter Howell; Dwayne O'Brien; Duane Propes
- Past members: Tim Rushlow; Brady Seals; Jeff Huskins; Steven Troy
- Website: littletexasonline.com

Little Texas is an American country music band founded in Nashville, Tennessee. The band consists of Porter Howell (lead guitar, vocals), Del Gray (drums), Dwayne O'Brien (rhythm guitar, vocals), and Duane Propes (bass guitar, vocals). They, along with Tim Rushlow (rhythm guitar, vocals) and Brady Seals (keyboards, vocals), formed the band in 1988. Signed to Warner Bros. Records Nashville in 1991, Little Texas released its debut album First Time for Everything that year. The album's lead off single, "Some Guys Have All the Love", reached a peak of No. 8 on the Billboard Hot Country Singles & Tracks charts. Little Texas charted thirteen top-40 hits between then and 1995, including the number one "My Love" in 1994. Their debut album earned a gold certification from the Recording Industry Association of America (RIAA), while 1993's Big Time is certified double platinum and 1994's Kick a Little is certified platinum.

Seals left the band in 1994 and was replaced by Jeff Huskins soon after. After a Greatest Hits package and a self-titled fourth studio album, the group disbanded in 1997. Seals went on to record multiple solo albums and one as the lead singer of Hot Apple Pie. Rushlow recorded one solo album and later founded the band Rushlow and the duo Rushlow Harris before joining the Frontmen. Gray, Howell, O'Brien, and Propes re-established Little Texas in 2004 with new lead singer Steven Troy, who left the band and resulted in Porter Howell taking over as lead vocalist. Under the four-piece lineup, the band has recorded two albums for Montage Music Group: The Very Best of Little Texas: Live and Loud and Missing Years.

== History ==
Little Texas was founded in Nashville, Tennessee, in 1988. Prior to the band's formation, Tim Rushlow and Dwayne O'Brien began playing together in Arlington, Texas, in 1984. Porter Howell and Duane Propes got together while they were in high school in 1983 and moved to Nashville to attend Belmont University. Brady Seals and Del Gray played in the backup band of country music singer Josh Logan. Rushlow, O'Brien, Propes, and Howell first started making music at Opryland as a 1950s show band. With both Rushlow's first wife and Howell's wife, plus two other members, they took the show band on the road, naming their act "The Varsities".

When two of the members left to pursue other interests, they contacted their old friends Gray and Seals, whom they had met while playing in Springfield, Massachusetts, in hopes of forging a more country/Southern rock sound. All six members eventually moved to Nashville, Tennessee, where they started playing together. The band played at venues across the United States (around 300 dates a year), eventually catching the attention of Nashville's division of Warner Bros. Records.

== Musical career ==
=== 1991-1993: First Time for Everything ===
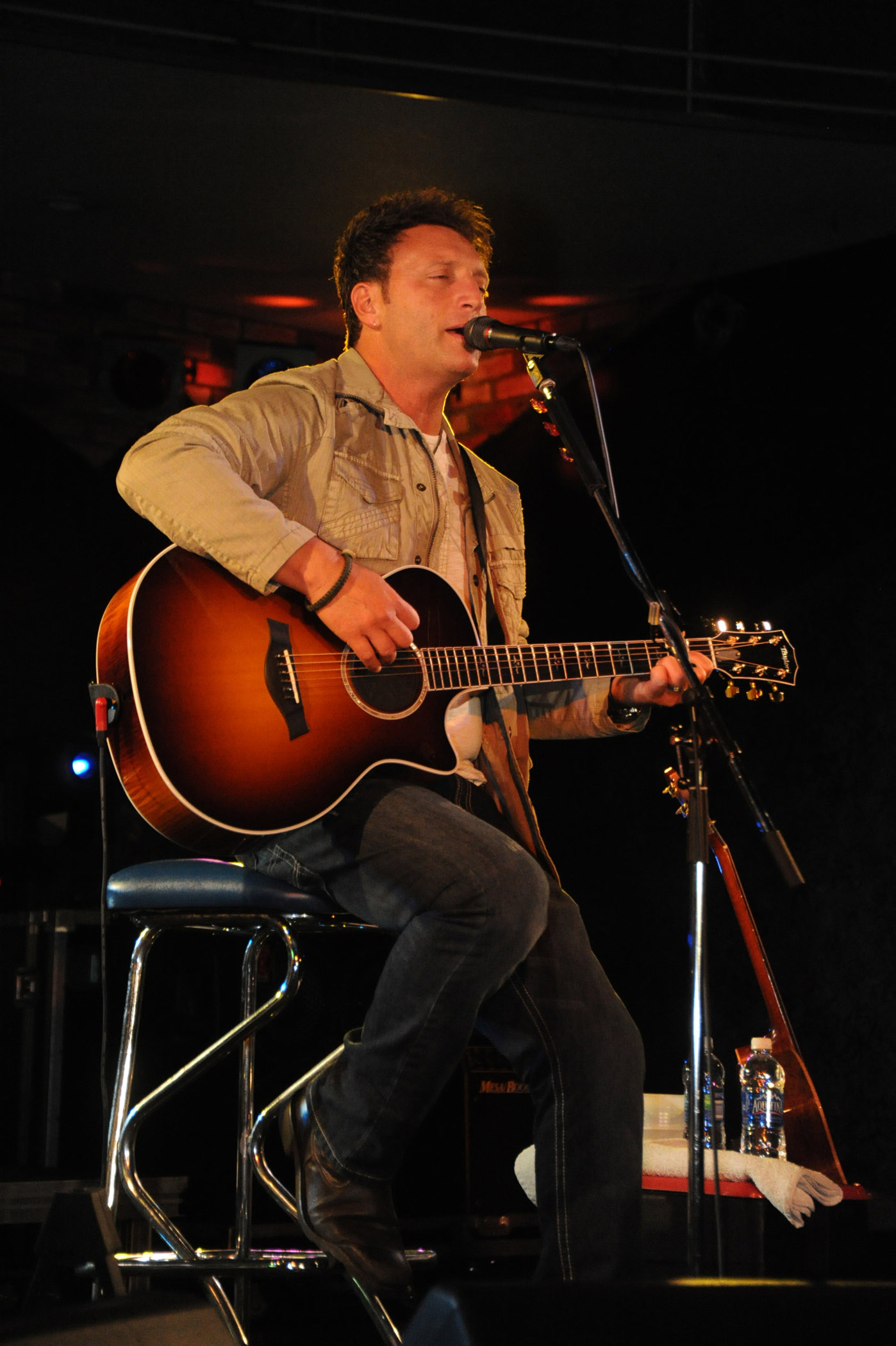
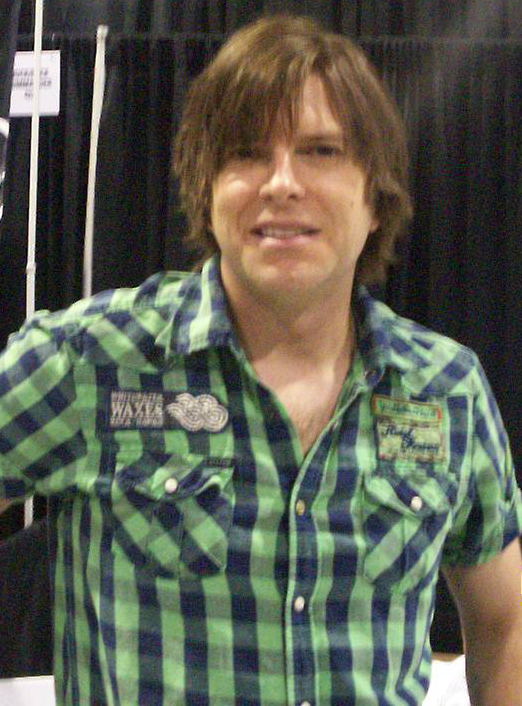
Tim Rushlow (left) and Brady Seals (right) were both in the original lineup.

Warner Bros. signed Little Texas in 1989, and two years later, the band released their debut single "Some Guys Have All the Love". This song, which reached No. 8 on the U.S. Billboard country singles charts, was the first of five singles from their debut album First Time for Everything. After the debut single came the album's title track at No. 13, "You and Forever and Me" at No. 5, "What Were You Thinkin'" at No. 17 and finally "I'd Rather Miss You" at No. 16. The album was certified gold by the RIAA for shipping 500,000 copies in the US.

=== 1993-1994: Big Time ===
Little Texas' second album, Big Time, was issued in 1993. Their most successful album, it was certified 2×Platinum by the RIAA and gold by the CRIA. It also produced a minor crossover hit in leadoff single "What Might Have Been", a No. 2 country hit that also reached No. 74 on the Billboard Hot 100 and No. 16 on Hot Adult Contemporary Tracks. After it came "God Blessed Texas" and their only number 1 hit on Billboard, "My Love", both of which were also minor Hot 100 entries. The latter also featured Seals on lead vocals. Finishing off Big Time was the No. 14 "Stop on a Dime". In late 1993, the band contributed a cover of the Eagles' "Peaceful Easy Feeling" to the multi-artist compilation album Common Thread: The Songs of the Eagles. The rendition featured O'Brien on lead vocals, with Denny Dadmun-Bixby of Great Plains on bass guitar and no involvement from Seals. The rendition peaked at number 73 on the country charts.

=== 1994-1996: Kick a Little and Greatest Hits ===
Kick a Little, the band's third album, was certified platinum by the RIAA. Leading off this album was its No. 5 title track, followed by the No. 4 "Amy's Back in Austin" and No. 27 "Southern Grace". After the album's release, however, Seals left for a solo career on Reprise Records, and was replaced by multi-instrumentalist Jeff Huskins, a former backing musician for Clint Black, for their tour to promote the album. Huskins made his first appearance on "Life Goes On" and "Country Crazy", two new tracks that the band recorded for their 1995 Greatest Hits. Both of these songs were released as singles. The former became their final Top 40 hit with a peak of No. 5, while "Country Crazy" stopped at No. 44. Also in 1995, the band sang on the track "Party All Night", a musical track which featured snippets from a Jeff Foxworthy sketch and a sung chorus by the band. This song reached No. 53, and later appeared on Foxworthy's 1996 album Crank It Up: The Music Album.

=== 1997-1998: Little Texas ===
Little Texas' fourth album was self-titled. Lead-off single "Bad for Us" peaked at No. 45, followed by their two lowest-charting singles, "Your Mama Won't Let Me" and "The Call" at No. 64 and No. 71 respectively. The band also charted that year with a cover of "Kiss the Girl", a song from the Disney film The Little Mermaid which they recorded on The Best of Country Sing the Best of Disney. Seals also charted his only Top 40 solo hit that year, the No. 32 "Another You, Another Me". Seals would record a total of three albums between then and 2003. After Little Texas, the band broke up.

=== Hiatus and status of former members ===
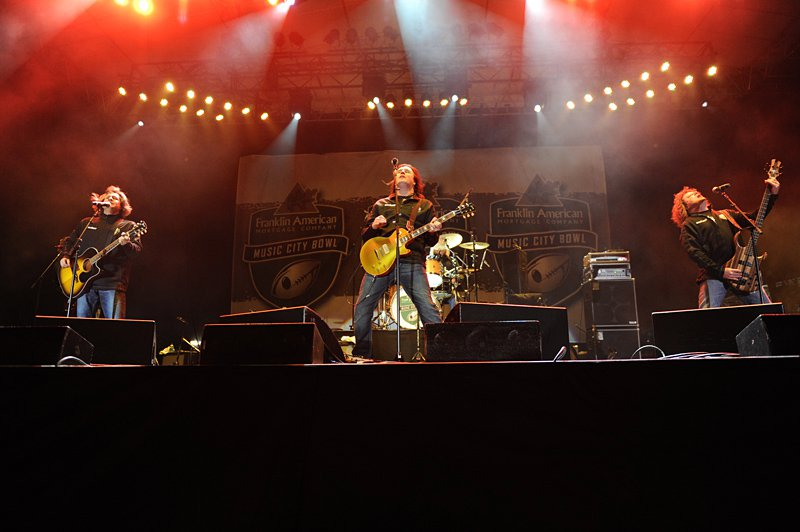
Little Texas Live

During the band's hiatus, Del Gray co-wrote Trace Adkins' 2000 single "More". Former frontman Tim Rushlow signed to Atlantic Records as a solo artist that same year, releasing a self-titled album. Although it accounted for four singles, including the No. 8 "She Misses Him", Atlantic closed its country music division in 2001. Rushlow then founded a second band, Rushlow, whose members included his cousin Doni Harris. Rushlow released two singles and one album (Right Now) on Lyric Street Records, but disbanded by 2004. Seals founded the band Hot Apple Pie, which released a self-titled album and three singles in 2005, while Rushlow and Harris founded the duo Rushlow Harris a year later. In addition, Howell recorded one album in the band Hilljack, which also included former solo artist Paul Jefferson.

=== Reunion ===
Duane Propes, Del Gray, Porter Howell, and Dwayne O'Brien decided to reunite Little Texas in 2004. When Little Texas reunited, Rushlow and Huskins made a legal attempt to keep their ex-bandmates from using the Little Texas name. As the other four members felt uncomfortable singing lead vocals in Rushlow's and Seals's absence, they recruited Steven Troy as new lead vocalist. However, O'Brien was critical of Troy's performance as lead singer, stating that it "just didn't feel authentic"; as a result, he exited the band in 2006. By the time the band had signed to Montage Music Group in 2007, producers for the label had suggested that Howell take over on lead vocals instead. Their first Montage Music release was the live album The Very Best of Little Texas: Live and Loud. They promoted this album on the Triple Threat Tour that year, which included both Restless Heart and Blackhawk; touring guitarist Mark Sutton accompanied the band on both the tour and the live album. This was followed one month later by the studio album Missing Years. This album produced three singles, although only one — the title track — made the country charts, peaking at No. 45.

Another studio album with Howell on lead vocals, Young for a Long Time, followed in 2015.

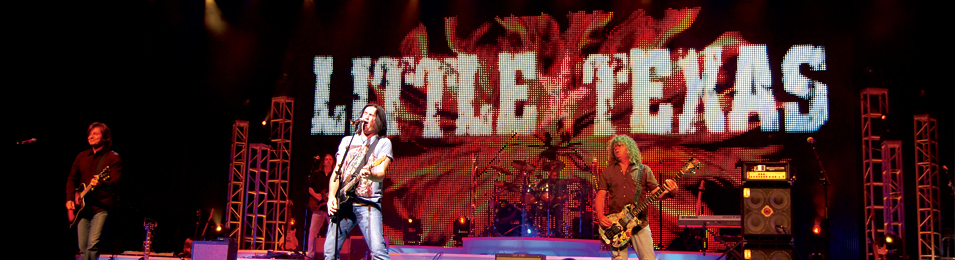

=== 2004-present ===
Little Texas has continued to tour constantly averaging 65 shows a year. In 2022, they are celebrating the 30th anniversary of the release of their debut album, First Time For Everything.

== Members ==
- Del Gray – drums (1988–1997, 2004–present)
- Porter Howell – lead guitar, background vocals (1988–1997, 2004–2006); lead vocals, lead guitar (2007–present)
- Dwayne O'Brien – rhythm guitar, lead and background vocals (1988–1997, 2004–present)
- Duane Propes – bass guitar, background vocals (1988–1997, 2004–present)

=== Former members ===
- Jeff Huskins – background vocals, fiddle, keyboards (1994–1997)
- Tim Rushlow – lead and background vocals, rhythm guitar (1988–1997)
- Brady Seals – lead and background vocals, keyboards, rhythm guitar (1988–1994)
- Steven Troy – lead vocals, rhythm guitar (2004–2006)

== Discography ==
- First Time for Everything (1992)
- Big Time (1993)
- Kick a Little (1994)
- Little Texas (1997)
- Missing Years (2007)
- Young for a Long Time (2015)

== Awards and nominations ==
=== Grammy Awards ===
Year	Nominee / work	Award	Result
1994	"God Blessed Texas"	Best Country Performance by a Duo or Group with Vocal	Nominated
1996	"Amy's Back in Austin"	Best Country Performance by a Duo or Group with Vocal	Nominated
1997	Hope: Country Music's Quest for a Cure (with John Berry, Terri Clark, Vince Gill, Faith Hill, Tracy Lawrence, Neal McCoy, Tim McGraw, Lorrie Morgan, Marty Stuart, Travis Tritt, and Trisha Yearwood)	Best Country Collaboration with Vocals	Nominated

=== American Music Awards ===
Year	Nominee / work	Award	Result
1994	Little Texas	Favorite Country Band/Duo/Group	Nominated
1995	Little Texas	Favorite Country Band/Duo/Group	Nominated

=== Academy of Country Music Awards ===
Year	Nominee / work	Award	Result
1993	Little Texas	Top New Vocal Group or Duet	Nominated
1993	Little Texas	Top Vocal Group of the Year	Nominated
1994	Little Texas	Top Vocal Group of the Year	Won
1994	"What Might Have Been"	Video of the Year	Nominated
1994	"What Might Have Been"	Song of the Year	Shortlisted
1994	Common Thread: The Songs of the Eagles	Album of the Year	Nominated
1995	Little Texas	Top Vocal Group of the Year	Nominated

=== Country Music Association Awards ===
Year	Nominee / work	Award	Result
1994	Common Thread: The Songs of the Eagles	Album of the Year	Won
1994	"God Blessed Texas"	Video of the Year	Nominated
1994	Little Texas	Vocal Group of the Year	Nominated
