= Amy's Back in Austin =

Country song

Single by Little Texas

from the album Kick a Little
- B-side: Excerpts from Country World Premiere radio show
- Released: December 24, 1994
- Recorded: 1994
- Genre: Country
- Length: 4:35
- Label: Warner Bros. Nashville
- Songwriters: Brady Seals, Stephen Allen Davis
- Producers: Little Texas, Christy Dinapoli, Doug Grau

Little Texas singles chronology
"Kick a Little" (1994)	"Amy's Back in Austin" (1994)	"Southern Grace" (1995)

"Amy's Back in Austin" is a song recorded by American country music group Little Texas. It was released in December 1994 as the second single from their third album Kick a Little. The song was written by the band's keyboardist and co-lead vocalist, Brady Seals and singer-songwriter Stephen Allen Davis. Amy's Back in Austin was Little Texas' eleventh entry on the Billboard charts, peaking at number 4 on the Hot Country Songs chart and reaching number 6 on Canada's RPM country tracks chart.

The song was nominated at the 1996 Grammy Awards for Best Country Performance by a Duo or Group with Vocals.

== Content ==
"Amy's Back in Austin" is a mid-tempo ballad. Its story revolves around a struggling young couple. The two run away together and leave Texas, their home, behind. The girl (Amy) soon becomes homesick and leaves the boy (the narrator) one night. In the chorus, the boy wonders where she went and why she left.

== Music video ==
The music video was directed by D.J. Webster and premiered in early 1995. It was filmed on location in Austin, Texas. Parts of the video that show Amy sitting and rolling backwards were filmed at Dance Across Texas Dancehall (2201 E Ben White Blvd, Austin, TX 78741) which is now permanently closed.

This is the band's first music video without Brady Seals, despite him co-writing the song.

== Chart performance ==
"Amy's Back in Austin" debuted at number 66 on the U.S. Billboard Hot Country Singles & Tracks for the week of December 24, 1994.

Chart (1994–1995)	Peak position
Canada Country Singles (RPM)	6
US Hot Country Songs (Billboard)	4

=== Year-end charts ===
Chart (1995)	Position
Canada Country Tracks (RPM)	20
US Country Songs (Billboard)	51

== Eli Young Band version ==
"Amy's Back in Austin"

Single by Eli Young Band featuring George Birge
- Released: December 4, 2023
- Genre: Country
- Length: 4:18
- Label: Four17
- Songwriters: Brady Seals, Stephen Allen Davis
- Producer: Duane Propes

Eli Young Band singles chronology
"Love Talking" (2022)	"Amy's Back in Austin" (2023)

In December 2023, Eli Young Band recorded a cover of the song with guest vocals from George Birge. Little Texas member Duane Propes produced this recording and played bass guitar on it. This rendition debuted at number 59 on the Country Airplay chart dated January 12, 2024.

=== Chart performance ===
Chart (2024)	Peak position
US Hot Country Songs (Billboard)	59
