= Kick a Little (song) =

Single by Little Texas

from the album Kick a Little
- B-side: "Hit Country Song"
- Released: August 16, 1994
- Recorded: 1994
- Genre: Country; country rock
- Length: 3:42
- Label: Warner Bros. Nashville 18103
- Songwriters: Porter Howell; Dwayne O'Brien; Brady Seals
- Producers: Little Texas; Christy Dinapoli; Doug Grau

Little Texas singles chronology
"Stop on a Dime" (1994)	"Kick a Little" (1994)	"Amy's Back in Austin" (1995)

"Kick a Little" is a song by American country music group Little Texas. It was released in August 1994 as the first single and title track from their album of the same name. It was their tenth single overall, and has become one of their signature songs. It was written by the band's chief songwriters: lead guitarist Porter Howell, guitarist Dwayne O'Brien and keyboardist and vocalist Brady Seals. The song reached #5 on the Billboard Hot Country Songs chart and #4 on the Canadian RPM country tracks chart.

== Content ==
"Kick a Little" is an up-tempo country rock song sung by former lead singer Tim Rushlow. Like Aaron Tippin's debut single "You've Got to Stand for Something", the song's narrator imparts the words of his father, who was never the first to fight but was always willing to stand up for what he believed or to defend his family.

== Music video ==
The wildly chaotic music video for "Kick a Little" was directed by Jon Small and premiered on CMT on August 20, 1994. Filmed at the Tennessee Performing Arts Center in Nashville, the video starts with dark storm clouds and the sound of debris blowing. The left camera pans to a heavyset man (Varsity Blues' Ron Lester) in a red cap, parking his pickup truck and exclaiming "Man, it's like there's a storm brewing up!" As the song starts, it shows the band (with Lester in the background) performing on an empty stage designed to look like a junkyard shop. During the guitar solo, a massive tornado bursts into the theater where the band continues performing while being bombarded with debris, papers and shop items. After the song finishes, a stunt double comes out from the entrance door and exclaims "Woo! Man, that Texas twister sure can kick!", before wiggling his belt line. This was also the band's last music video to feature Brady Seals before he left for a solo career at the end of 1994.

== Charts ==
"Kick a Little" debuted at number 68 on the US Billboard Hot Country Singles & Tracks for the week of August 27, 1994.

=== Weekly charts ===
Chart (1994)	Peak position
Canada Country Singles (RPM)	4
US Bubbling Under Hot 100 (Billboard)	8
US Hot Country Songs (Billboard)	5

=== Year-end charts ===
Chart (1994)	Position
Canada Country Tracks (RPM)	34
