= My Love (Little Texas song) =

Single by Little Texas

from the album Big Time
- B-side: "Only Thing I'm Sure Of"
- Released: January 13, 1994
- Recorded: 1993
- Genre: Country
- Length: 4:05
- Label: Warner Bros. 18295
- Songwriters: Porter Howell, Brady Seals, Tommy Barnes
- Producers: James Stroud, Christy DiNapoli, Doug Grau

Little Texas singles chronology
| "God Blessed Texas" (1993) | "My Love" (1994) | "Stop on a Dime" (1994) |

"My Love" is a song recorded by the American country music band Little Texas. It was co-written by the band's keyboardist Brady Seals (who also sang lead vocals on it) and lead guitarist Porter Howell along with Tommy Barnes. It was released in January 1994 as the third single from the album, Big Time. The song reached the top of the Billboard country singles charts, becoming the band's only Number One country hit. The song features lead vocals from Brady Seals, then the band's keyboardist.

== Music video ==
The music video was directed by Gerry Wenner, and premiered in early 1994.

== Chart positions ==
"My Love" debuted at number 72 on the U.S. Billboard Hot Country Singles & Tracks for the week of January 15, 1994.

| Chart (1994) | Peak position |
|---|---|
| Canada Country Singles (RPM) | 2 |
| US Billboard Hot 100 | 83 |
| US Hot Country Songs (Billboard) | 1 |

=== Year-end charts ===
| Chart (1994) | Position |
|---|---|
| Canada Country Tracks (RPM) | 46 |
| US Country Songs (Billboard) | 23 |
