= Some Guys Have All the Love =

Single by Little Texas

from the album First Time for Everything
- B-side: "First Time for Everything"
- Released: September 1991
- Recorded: December 1990
- Genre: Country
- Length: 2:53
- Label: Warner Bros. Nashville 19024
- Songwriters: Dwayne O'Brien; Porter Howell
- Producers: Christy DiNapoli; Doug Grau; James Stroud

Little Texas singles chronology
"Some Guys Have All the Love" (1991)	"First Time for Everything" (1992)

"Some Guys Have All the Love" is the debut song recorded by American country music group Little Texas. It was released in September 1991 as the lead single from their debut album, First Time for Everything. It was co-written by the band's lead guitarist Porter Howell and rhythm guitarist Dwayne O'Brien. The song peaked at #8 on the Billboards Hot Country Songs chart and reached #11 on the Canadian RPM country Tracks chart in 1991.

== Content ==
In "Some Guys Have All the Love", the narrator tells his lover how while some guys may have fame and fortune, he's got her and she's all he needs.

== Music video ==
It was their first music video and was directed by Jim May; it begins by introducing each member of the band (showing their boots) and then shows them playing the song.

== Chart performance ==
Chart (1991)	Peak position
Canada Country Singles (RPM)	11
US Hot Country Songs (Billboard)	8
