= Mark Matejka =

American guitarist (born 1967)

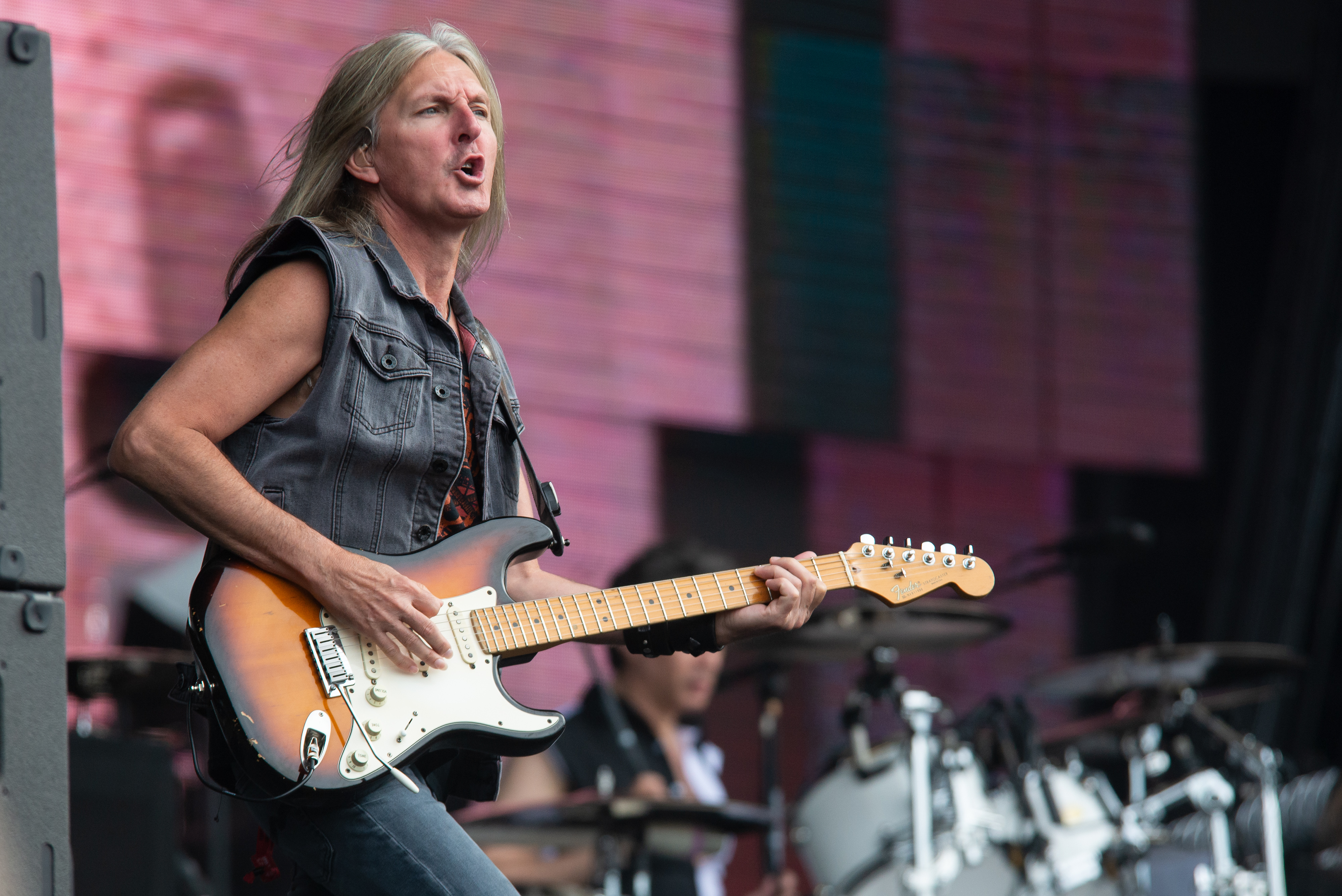
- Matejka in 2019

Background information
- Born: January 2, 1967 (age 59); Houston, Texas, U.S.
- Genres: Southern rock, hard rock, blues rock, country
- Occupation: Guitarist
- Years active: 1990s–present
- Member of: Lynyrd Skynyrd
- Formerly of: Sons of the Desert, Hot Apple Pie

Vincent Mark "Sparky" Matejka (born January 2, 1967), is an American rock guitarist. He joined Lynyrd Skynyrd in 2006, replacing Hughie Thomasson who had left to reform Outlaws. He first played with the band on their Christmas Time Again album in 2000 and was credited with guitar and vocals.

== Biography ==
Matejka was born in Houston, Texas on January 2, 1967. He graduated from James E. Taylor High School, in Katy, Texas in 1985.

Attended The University of North Texas College of Music in Denton (North Texas State), achieving and holding first chair in guitar (jazz) for the duration.

Prior to joining Lynyrd Skynyrd, Matejka was a member of Hot Apple Pie, a country music band. He also played for Charlie Daniels Band and Sons of the Desert.

He played guitar on tour with the Kinleys in 1998.
