= You and Forever and Me =

Single by Little Texas

from the album First Time for Everything
- B-side: "Dance"
- Released: June 8, 1992
- Genre: Country
- Length: 3:43
- Label: Warner Bros. Nashville 18867
- Songwriters: Porter Howell, Stewart Harris
- Producers: Christy DiNapoli; Doug Grau; James Stroud

Little Texas singles chronology
"First Time for Everything" (1992)	"You and Forever and Me" (1992)	"What Were You Thinkin'" (1992)

"You and Forever and Me" is a song recorded by American country music group Little Texas. It was released in June 1992 as the third single from their debut album First Time for Everything. It was co-written by the band's lead guitarist Porter Howell and Stewart Harris. The song peaked at number 5 on the Billboards Hot Country Songs chart and reached number 18 on the Canadian RPM country Tracks chart in 1992.

== Content ==
In "You and Forever and Me", sung by Tim Rushlow, the narrator is passing through his old hometown one afternoon after being away and recalls his memories of his teenage years and a lost love.

== Critical reception ==
Deborah Evans Price, of Billboard magazine reviewed the song favorably, calling it a "summertime ballad from a progressive group." She goes on to say that the "praiseworthy performance frolicks with harmonies" and that the production is "effectively smooth."

== Music video ==
The music video, directed by Jim Shea, shows the band on their bus driving through the desert. Each band member has flashbacks about former loves.

== Chart performance ==
"You and Forever and Me" debuted at number 70 on the U.S. Billboard Hot Country Singles & Tracks for the week of June 20, 1992.

Chart (1992)	Peak position
Canada Country Singles (RPM)	18
US Hot Country Songs (Billboard)	5

=== Year-end charts ===
Chart (1992)	Position
US Country Songs (Billboard)	61
