= I'd Rather Miss You =

Single by Little Texas

from the album First Time for Everything
- B-side: "Cry On"
- Released: January 18, 1993
- Genre: Country
- Length: 3:57
- Label: Warner Bros. Nashville 18867
- Songwriters: Porter Howell; Dwayne O'Brien
- Producers: Christy DiNapoli; Doug Grau; James Stroud

Little Texas singles chronology
"What Were You Thinkin'" (1992)	"I'd Rather Miss You" (1993)	"What Might Have Been" (1993)

"I'd Rather Miss You" is a song recorded by American country music group Little Texas. It was released in January 1993 as the fifth and final single from their debut album, First Time for Everything. It was co-written by the band's lead guitarist Porter Howell and rhythm guitarist Dwayne O'Brien. The song peaked at number 16 on the Billboards Hot Country Songs chart and reached number 13 on the Canadian RPM country Tracks chart in 1993.

== Content ==
The song is a ballad in which the narrator states that he would rather be lonely and not have a significant other because the only one he wants to be with is his ex.

== Music video ==
The music video was directed by Ken Ross and premiered in early 1993.

== Chart performance ==
"I'd Rather Miss You" debuted at number 65 on the U.S. Billboard Hot Country Singles & Tracks for the week of January 30, 1993.

Chart (1993)	Peak position
Canada Country Singles (RPM)	13
US Hot Country Songs (Billboard)	16
