= Peaceful Easy Feeling =

Single by Eagles

from the album Eagles
- B-side: "Tryin'"
- Released: December 1, 1972
- Recorded: Olympic Sound (London, England)
- Genre: Soft rock; country rock; folk rock
- Length: 4:13
- Label: Asylum
- Songwriter: Jack Tempchin
- Producer: Glyn Johns

Eagles singles chronology
| "Witchy Woman" (1972) | "Peaceful Easy Feeling" (1972) | "Tequila Sunrise" (1973) |

"Peaceful Easy Feeling" is a song written by Jack Tempchin and recorded by the Eagles. It was the third single from the band's 1972 debut album Eagles. The single reached No. 22 on the charts and is one of the band's most popular songs. Glenn Frey sings the lead vocal, with Bernie Leadon providing the main harmony vocal (starting in the beginning of the second verse) and Randy Meisner completing this three-part harmony.

== Background ==
Jack Tempchin wrote the song during a period in which he was performing at folk coffee shops around his hometown of San Diego. A friend had created a poster to advertise his performances, which included fake quotes from famous individuals attesting to Tempchin's talent, which landed in the hands of a shop owner in nearby El Centro. Tempchin slept on the floor of the club the night of his show, and wrote an early version of "Peaceful Easy Feeling" on the back of the poster. Back in San Diego, Tempchin was rooming in a communal-type home with other musicians when inspiration for completing the song hit.

We'd sit in front of the picture window and watch the beautiful girls on the bus stop bench and fall in love with them until their bus came. We talked in those days about how love never seems to show up until you stop looking for it. But, as young guys, we were unable to stop looking for love even for one day.

During a following trip to Old Town San Diego State Historic Park, Tempchin saw a girl with "turquoise earrings against her dark skin," which he incorporated into the song. "I guess I was trying to distill the beauty of every girl I saw into words on paper and then into a song," he later stated. He later completed the song's third verse in the parking lot of the Der Wienerschnitzel fast food establishment in San Diego.

Some time later, Tempchin had moved to Los Angeles and was attempting to break into the music industry alongside Jackson Browne, Glenn Frey, and JD Souther. Frey heard Tempchin's "Peaceful Easy Feeling" and asked if he could develop it further, adding that his new band, the Eagles, had only just formed eight days prior. He presented Tempchin with a cassette demo on the track the next day, who later remarked, "It was so good I couldn’t believe it."

Billboard described the song as "a pop-flavored progressive country effort with lyrics that penetrate and stick in the mind." Record World called it "mellow country folk music at its best."

== Personnel ==
- Glenn Frey – lead vocals, acoustic guitar
- Bernie Leadon – B-Bender electric guitar, harmony vocals
- Randy Meisner – bass, backing vocals
- Don Henley – drums, backing vocals

== Cover versions ==
On the 1993 album Common Thread: The Songs of the Eagles, country music band Little Texas recorded a cover of "Peaceful Easy Feeling". This cover version charted at No. 74 on the U.S. Billboard Hot Country Songs charts and was later included on the band's 1995 Greatest Hits album.

== Charts ==
| Chart (1972–1973) | Peak position |
|---|---|
| Canada Top Singles (RPM) | 35 |
| Canadian Adult Contemporary (RPM) | 22 |
| US Billboard Hot 100 | 22 |
| US Easy Listening (Billboard) | 20 |

== Certifications ==
| Region | Certification | Certified units/sales |
|---|---|---|
| New Zealand (RMNZ) | 2× Platinum | 60,000^{‡} |
| United Kingdom (BPI) | Silver | 200,000^{‡} |
^{‡} Sales+streaming figures based on certification alone.
