= Montage Music Group =

American record label

- Parent company: Hedgewood International
- Founded: 2006
- Founder: Allen Butler
- Distributor(s): RED Distribution
- Genre: Country
- Country of origin: U.S.
- Location: Nashville, Tennessee
- Official website: www.atlanticrecords.com

Montage Music Group was an American independent record label based in Nashville, Tennessee, specializing in country music. Acts signed to the label include Andy Griggs, Matt King, Ryan Shupe & the RubberBand, Little Texas, Minnie Murphy, and The Road Hammers. All of these acts except Murphy were previously signed to other labels.

The label was founded in May 2006 by Allen Butler, formerly the head of Sony Music Nashville. Little Texas was the first act signed to the label.

Parent company Hedgewood International announced in February 2009 that the label was "reorganizing".
