= Brady Seals =

American singer-songwriter

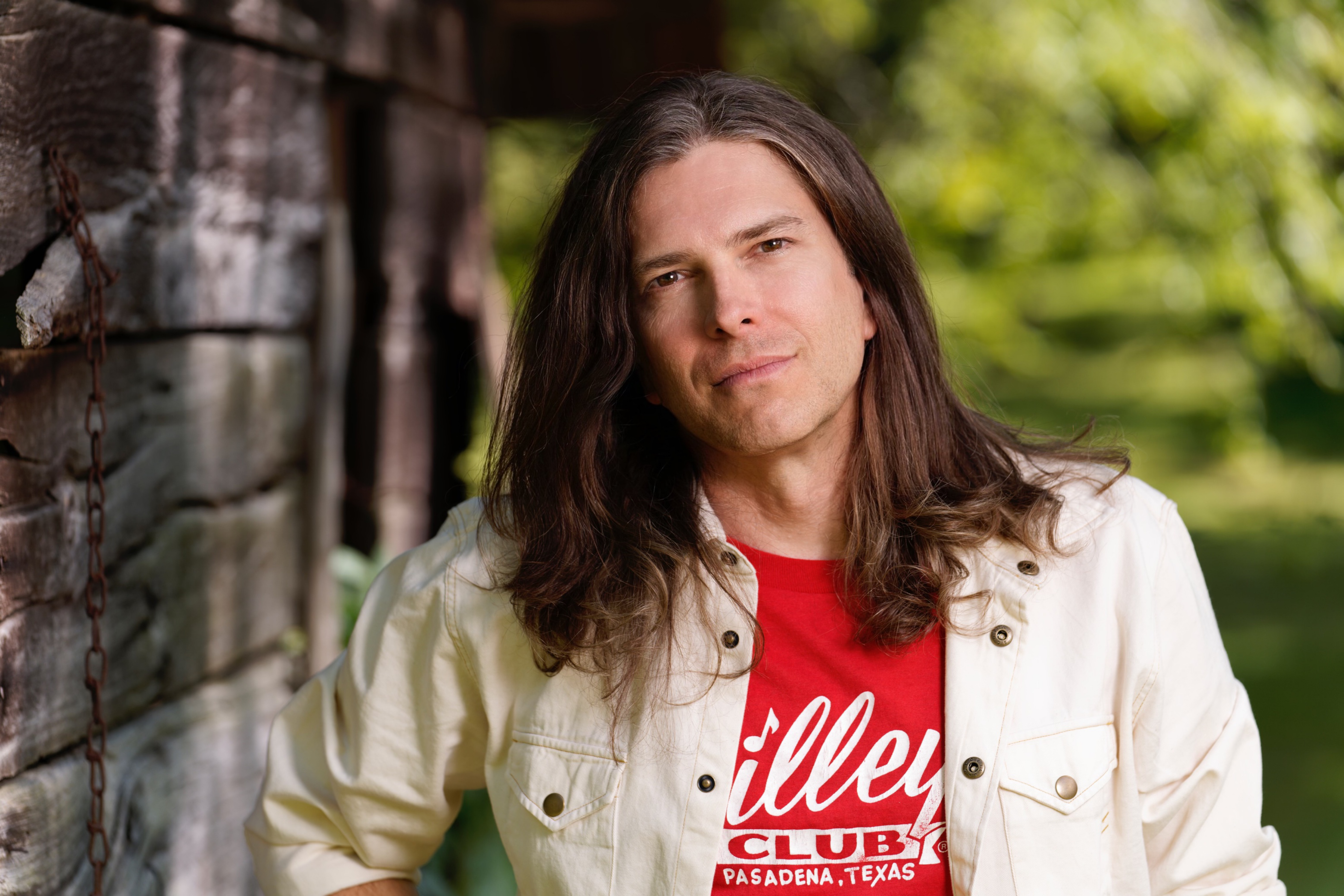
- Brady Seals

Background information
- Born: March 29, 1969 (age 57)
- Origin: Fairfield, Ohio, U.S.
- Genres: Country
- Occupation: Singer-songwriter
- Instruments: Vocals, keyboards, guitar
- Years active: 1988–present
- Labels: Reprise/Warner Bros. Image Entertainment; Star City/Nine North
- Formerly of: Little Texas, Hot Apple Pie
- Website: www.bradyseals.com

Brady Seals (born March 29, 1969) is an American country music artist. He is the cousin of Jim Seals (of Seals & Crofts) and Dan Seals, Johnny Duncan, the nephew of Troy Seals. Seals made his debut in 1988 as co-lead vocalist and keyboardist in the sextet Little Texas, with whom he recorded until his departure in late 1994. Between then and 2002, he recorded as a solo singer, releasing three studio albums and charting in the Top 40 on the country charts with "Another You, Another Me". In 2002, Seals formed a quartet called Hot Apple Pie, in which he has recorded one studio album and charted three singles. A fourth solo album, Play Time, was released in 2009 via Star City.

== Biography ==
Seals was raised in a musical home in the Cincinnati, Ohio, suburb of Fairfield. He began playing piano and writing songs at the age of nine, and was performing in a high-school band at the age of 16. After leaving home not long after, Seals returned to finish his education, but then left again. He ended up in Nashville and joined the group Little Texas with friend and fellow musician Del Gray.

Seals spent six years with Little Texas, playing keyboards and co-writing all of the band's major hits. By late 1994, shortly after the release of their third album, Kick a Little, Seals had left the group and began a solo career. He signed to Reprise Records and released his debut album, The Truth, in 1996. It produced three chart singles for him, including his only solo top 40 hit, "Another You, Another Me" at number 32. Another album, the self-titled Brady Seals, was issued in 1998 via Reprise Records' parent label, Warner Bros. Records, 2003's Thompson Street, released via Image Entertainment

Seals formed the band Hot Apple Pie. This band recorded a self-titled debut album for DreamWorks Records and charted three country singles, including the number 26 "Hillbillies." Seals's fourth album, Play Time, was released in 2009 via StarCity Recording Company.

== Discography ==
=== Albums ===
| Title | Album details | Peak chart positions | | |
| Title | Album details | US Country | US Heat | CAN Country |
|---|---|---|---|---|
| The Truth | Release date: February 25, 1997; Label: Reprise Records | 44 | 39 | 36 |
| Brady Seals | Release date: August 25, 1998; Label: Warner Bros. Records | — | — | — |
| Thompson Street | Release date: February 25, 2003; Label: Image Entertainment | — | — | — |
| Play Time | Release date: August 18, 2009; Label: Nine North | — | — | — |
"—" denotes releases that did not chart

=== Singles ===
| Year | Single | Peak chart positions | | | Album |
| Year | Single | US Country | US | CAN Country | Album |
|---|---|---|---|---|---|
| 1996 | "Another You, Another Me" | 32 | 91 | 42 | The Truth |
| 1997 | "Still Standing Tall" | 69 | — | 67 | The Truth |
| 1997 | "She" | — | — | — | The Truth |
| 1997 | "Natural Born Lovers" | 74 | — | — | The Truth |
| 1998 | "I Fell" | 55 | — | 84 | Brady Seals |
| 1998 | "Whole Lotta Hurt" | 66 | — | — | Brady Seals |
| 1999 | "The Best Is Yet to Come" | 74 | — | — | Brady Seals |
| 2009 | "Ho Down" | — | — | — | Play Time |
| 2010 | "Been There, Drunk That" | — | — | — | Play Time |
"—" denotes releases that did not chart

=== Music videos ===
| Year | Video | Director |
|---|---|---|
| 1996 | "Another You, Another Me" | Gerry Wenner |
| 1997 | "Natural Born Lovers" | |
| 1998 | "I Fell" | Gerry Wenner |
| 2010 | "Been There, Drunk That" | James King |
