= Changing Horses (Incredible String Band album) =

Studio album by the Incredible String Band
- Released: November 1969
- Recorded: Summer 1969
- Studios: Sound Techniques, Chelsea, London, Elektra Records Studios, New York City, NY
- Genres: Psychedelic folk; folk
- Length: 50:03
- Label: Elektra / WEA
- Producer: Joe Boyd

The Incredible String Band chronology
Wee Tam and the Big Huge (1968)	Changing Horses (1969)	I Looked Up (1970)

Singles from Changing Horses
- 1. "Big Ted" Released: October 1969

Professional ratings
Review scores
Source	Rating
Allmusic	2/5 stars
Rolling Stone	(Positive)

Changing Horses is the fifth album by the Scottish psychedelic folk group, the Incredible String Band (ISB), and was released in November 1969 on Elektra Records (see 1969 in music). The album saw the group continuing their use of unique instruments while integrating a standard musical structure. In addition, the album is seen as a transitional period in which the ISB shifted in musical textures, including early utilization of electric-based instruments.

This album also marks the point when the band openly gave up the use of drugs and joined the Church of Scientology. "White Bird" expresses the members' changing views in a shift that would affect the band's musical direction in the next decade. The creative differences between Heron and Williamson also continued with the album. Heron wrote two tracks while Williamson penned four on the album, but, in the first occurrence featured on an ISB album, the two had joint credits on the song, "Dust Be Diamonds". The two, despite being bandmates, typically composed whole tracks individually, so as to maintain their own separate musical identity. As they progressed, the two began to have influence on another's compositions, specifically the instrumental arrangements. They also confirmed their partners Licorice McKechnie and Rose Simpson had upheld larger roles in the band. This, along with the album cover, assembled the official quartet.

The album is dominated by two lengthy tracks, "White Bird", by Mike Heron, and "Creation", by Robin Williamson. The two songs comprise more than half of the 50 minute length of the album; lyrics are given only for the pair of songs. Changing Horses comes after the success the band achieved in 1968 with their albums, The Hangman's Beautiful Daughter and Wee Tam and the Big Huge. The ISB was one of the top folk groups in the UK, and, despite respectable chart listings, the album was generally received as a disappointment in comparison to the band's earlier work. Still, "Creation" and "White Bird" are deemed to be instrumental, and lyrical highlights of the band's music catalogue as they displayed several of the group's strengths.

== Background ==
The Incredible String Band spent much of 1969 touring in the UK and the United States. Now a four-piece band, with McKechnie and Simpson officially in the fold, the ISB improved in their communication with their audience, an aspect they attempted to improve upon after their conversion to Scientology. The band undertook extensive studies of spirituality and philosophy as a way of self-analyzing, and their religious conversion was a part of the process. Changing Horses reflected upon these developments and their abstinence from the use of drugs, which did not change the group's complexity, but the structure differed from the Wee Tam album. Wee Tam, and earlier efforts, had a basis of producing compositions where the message would vary, depending on the individual's perception of it, while Changing Horses established more coherent tracks with an almost specified meaning. The album, in some sorts, is noted as the band's transitional period from psychedelic folk to British folk rock, and even early progressive rock influences. On the album's tracks, the electric guitar was involved in the proceedings. This trend came full circle for the band in recordings of the following decade. The group, despite all the changes, still held some aspects of the counter-culture such as their way of communal living at their farmhouse in Pembrokeshire. As Heron later confirmed, "the album which marked our conversion, if you will, was Changing Horses".

Joe Boyd, the band's longtime record producer, returned for the album. Boyd was flexible with the group's creative development, and rarely interfered with their process. His approach to the ISB's output was to allow them to decide what material appeared on the final product as Boyd, who also produced other extravagant acts like Fairport Convention and Nick Drake, encouraged unique musical compositions. Williamson later praised Boyd saying, "He used to just sort of get you in there. And if you said to him, 'Well I would like such and such' he would get it for you. But otherwise, just let you get on with it". Boyd, noticing the group's change and potential faults, attempted to intervene, but, in the end, continued allowing the band to develop their new concepts. Another major production member was John Wood, sound engineer at Sound Techniques. The studio initially included only basic recording equipment not yet able to showcase the band's full musical inventiveness. By their third album, the facilities held 16-tracks, allowing the group to overdub and jump tracks to generate their multi-instrumental sound.

Recording took place on an intermittent basis in between gaps in the ISB's summer touring schedule. Much of their recording was completed in Sound Techniques, except for "Big Ted", which was recorded in New York City. Lyrically, the compositions went in the same vein as earlier developments regarding perceptions and interpretations of life, religion, and mythology. That concept was altered slightly by the band's conversion to their new religion as they were consciously aware of creating effective communication. The recordings had an added sense of accessibility that served as a contrast to their more complex takes on themes in the group's previous compositions. Instrumentally, the band still utilized exotic instruments derived from eastern and African influences that were most evident on the album's two longest tracks. Complexity, too, highlighted the instrumentals though the multi-tracking was not as heavily employed or necessary as on past efforts.

With McKechnie and Simpson sharing larger roles in the band, they too were performing, instrumentally, along with their backing vocals duties. Another surprising development resulting from the album was Simpson's emergence as a prominent member in the sessions after improving upon her capability on the bass guitar. Prior to the recording of Changing Horses, Simpson was not credited as a bass player on a single track. On this album, however, Simpson was featured as playing the bass guitar on every composition that included instruments. McKechnie, for that reason, dealt with several different instruments in order to retain a presence in the studio. Two guest musicians and close associates with the ISB, Ivan Pawle and Walter Gundy, appear on the album, contributing to "Big Ted" and "Creation", respectively. Several non-vinyl compositions were also produced during recording sessions. Two tracks, "Veshengro" and "All Writ Down", later appeared on the Be Glad for the Song Has No Ending soundtrack in 1971, but numerous songs have yet to be released officially.

== Release ==
Changing Horses was released on the Elektra label (catalogue number EKS-74057 on stereo, Y8K8 42037 on 8-track) in November 1969. The cover photo by Janet Shankman (Williamson's future wife) featured all four band members, for the first time as a group, perched in a tree, grinning, to express a lighter mood. The album's back cover offered lyrics to "Creation", and individual song credits. Inside there is original artwork by Williamson on the left side, and Heron on the right. Lyrics for "White Bird" are assorted into Heron's artwork. A single, "Big Ted" b/w "All Writ Down", was released to the UK a month prior to the album's release, but failed to chart. The "Big Ted" song featured on the single was an edited version of the album track. Single releases were a relatively rare occurrence for the band who only issued two others up to that point. The album was more financially successful than its predecessor, and on the UK Albums Charts it peaked at number 30 before dropping off the charts in a week. In the US it reached number 166 on the Billboard 200, spending three weeks on the charts. Despite the band's effort to experiment musically, it has been cited that Changing Horses was a missed opportunity after their public media exposure at the Woodstock Festival earlier in the year.

=== Reissues ===
Changing Horses was reissued to the UK by Hannibal Records on its first compact disc release in 1993. The CD version included a 16-page liner note booklet, along with a complete set of lyrics for all the tracks. In September 2002, a single disc distributed by Collector's Choice Records featured the album along with the band's 1970 album, I Looked Up. Two further re-releases were issued in the US and Japan on September 20, 2006.

== Track listing ==
Side A
No.	Title	Writer(s)	Length
1.	"Big Ted"	Robin Williamson	4:21
2.	"White Bird"	Mike Heron	14:46
3.	"Dust Be Diamonds"	Heron (music), Williamson (lyrics)	6:14

Side B
No.	Title	Writer(s)	Length
1.	"Sleepers, Awake!"	Heron	3:44
2.	"Mr. and Mrs."	Williamson	4:54
3.	"Creation"	Williamson	16:04

== Single ==
- "Big Ted" b/w "All Writ Down" (Elektra 45074) October 1969, UK

== Personnel ==
- Robin Williamson — lead vocals (1, 3–6), acoustic guitar (5, 6), piano (1), flute (2), sarangi (2), Chinese banjo (2), electric guitar (3), Hammond organ (3), gimbri (6), violin (6), percussion (1, 2, 3, 5), backing vocals (2)
- Mike Heron — lead vocals (2, 4), acoustic guitar (2, 3), electric guitar (1, 5), piano (1), vibraphone (3), sitar (6), mandolin (6), percussion (5, 6), backing vocals (1, 5, 6)
- Licorice McKechnie — lead vocals (4), Hammond organ (2, 3, 5), kazoo (3, 6), guitar (1), percussion (6), backing vocals (1, 2, 5, 6)
- Rose Simpson — lead vocals (4), bass guitar (1–3, 5, 6), percussion (6), backing vocals (1, 2, 5, 6)

=== Additional musicians ===
- Walter Gundy — harmonica (1)
- Ivan Pawle — Hammond organ and piano (6) (appears courtesy of Dr. Strangely Strange)

== Chart positions ==
Chart	Entry date	Peak position	Weeks charted
UK Albums Chart	24 January 1970	30	1
The Billboard 200	6 December 1969	166	3
