= Be Glad for the Song Has No Ending =

Soundtrack album by The Incredible String Band
- Released: March 1971
- Recorded: July 1968 – April 1969, Sound Techniques, Chelsea, London
- Genres: Psychedelic folk, folk
- Length: 50:19
- Label: Island
- Producer: Joe Boyd

The Incredible String Band chronology
U (1970)	Be Glad for the Song Has No Ending (1971)	Liquid Acrobat as Regards the Air (1971)

Be Glad for the Song Has No Ending is the eighth album by the Scottish psychedelic folk group, the Incredible String Band, featuring Mike Heron, Robin Williamson, Licorice McKechnie and Rose Simpson. It is the soundtrack for a film of the same name, and was released on Island Records in March 1971, failing to chart in either the UK or the US. It would be the first album from the band on the Island label, and the last to feature Joe Boyd as the producer.

== Background ==
=== Recording ===
Recording of the album and soundtrack came during a transitional period for the band. Tracks were completed during Wee Tam and the Big Huge and I Looked Up sessions. As a result, the girlfriends Licorice McKechnie and Rose Simpson are more involved in some tracks in comparison to others. Even the compositions themselves reflect differentiation from the dream-like folk pieces to the less experimental contemporary ones that are more similar to Liquid Acrobat as Regards the Air. The whole B-side of the album is instrumentals that were the soundtrack of the documentary. They appear in the film to set mood to significant scenes. Three additional tracks were added from the Wee Tam sessions that did not make it to the album to have a completed LP. Joe Boyd stated the whole development was "a kind of clear out the cupboard thing".

=== Film ===
A film companion to the album was released in July 1970 featuring The Incredible String Band. The first part of the film, a more straightforward music documentary, includes stage performances and interviews with the members of the band about recording, their lives, and their creative process. The second part of the film features the band with friends dressing up to perform a short, 20-minute dramatic play called The Pirate and The Crystal Ball.

Filming began as early as March 1968 with a concert at Royal Festival Hall, and was budgeted by Ominibus for what they expected to be a straightforward documentary. Since there were limited camera angles, the concert was broken down into brief clips of pre-selected segments. After segments of material including "Mercy I Cry City" and "A Very Cellular Song" performed in concert, brief questioning is taken up by reporters. To one particular question regarding the meaning of their music, Heron responds, "If I could describe my songs I wouldn't sing them". Then, extensive interviews are conducted at the group's communal home in Glasgow along with clips of their daily lives. The film finishes with the play designed by the band, which was completed in one weekend. A basic story line includes a pirate attempting to steal a crystal ball from three fates (Simpson, McKechnie, and Schofield). The fates enlist a hunter (Maistre) to set matters right, and the hunter captures the pirate to be judged by two Gods (Williamson and Heron). In the end, the pirate is forced into an endless cycle of reincarnation. A collage of psychedelic images relating to the pirate's past begins and ends with the sound of a baby's cry, concluding the fable.

== Track listing ==
Side one

No.	Title	Writer(s)	Length
1.	"Come With Me"	Robin Williamson	3:51
2.	"All Writ Down"	Mike Heron	4:24
3.	"Veshengro"	Williamson	5:03
4.	"See All the People"	Heron	3:38
5.	"Waiting for You"	Williamson	6:42
Total length:			25:38

Side two

No.	Title	Writer(s)	Length
1.	"The Song Has No Ending" (Parts 1 to 9)	Heron, Williamson	26:41
Total length:			26:41

== Personnel ==
- Robin Williamson - vocals, guitars, violin, mandolin, piano, bass guitar, sarangi, bouzouki, gimbri, shawm, whistle, percussion
- Mike Heron - vocals, guitars, organ, harpsichord, sitar, bass guitar, glockenspiel, chimes
- Licorice McKechnie - vocals, recorder, organ, mandolin, shaker, kazoo
- Rose Simpson - vocals, bass guitar, recorder, tabla
