= Liquid Acrobat as Regards the Air =

Liquid Acrobat As Regards The Air

Studio album by Incredible String Band
- Released: October 1971
- Recorded: August 1971
- Studios: Sound Techniques, London; Island, London
- Genres: Psychedelic folk, British folk rock
- Length: 48:29
- Label: Island
- Producer: Stanley Schnier

Incredible String Band chronology
Be Glad for the Song Has No Ending (1971)	Liquid Acrobat As Regards The Air (1971)	Earthspan (1972)

Liquid Acrobat as Regards the Air is the ninth album by the Incredible String Band. It features Mike Heron, Robin Williamson, Licorice McKechnie and Malcolm Le Maistre. The album was the band's first almost entirely electric recording; a new feature that was to define the change in the band's sound throughout their final period through 1974.

This was also the first album without Rose Simpson who was going to become a sound engineer, but started a family instead. Gerry Conway, a drummer of Fairport Convention appears on the album.

The most ambitious track is also its lengthiest. "Darling Belle", the track Williamson said "came to me in a dream", is composed of three-way vocals and spoken-word. Heron would vocalise and McKechnie would mimic his words with her high-pitch vocals. It tells the story of a woman from childhood to old age. "Tree" is a remake of the song "The Tree" from the band's first album.

== Track listing ==
All tracks are written by Robin Williamson except as noted.

No.	Title	Writer(s)	Length
1.	"Talking Of The End"		5:30
2.	"Dear Old Battlefield"		3:05
3.	"Cosmic Boy"	Mike Heron, Licorice McKechnie	3:49
4.	"Worlds They Rise and Fall"	Heron	3:23
5.	"Evolution Rag"		4:42
6.	"Painted Chariot"	Heron	3:42
7.	"Adam and Eve"		2:31
8.	"Red Hair"	Heron	2:05
9.	"Here Till Here is There"		3:04
10.	"Tree"	Heron	2:58
11.	"Jigs: Eyes Like Leaves / Sunday Is My Wedding Day / Drops Of Whiskey / Grumbling Old Men"	Traditional, arr. Williamson	2:41
12.	"Darling Belle"		10:59

== Personnel ==
- Mike Heron - lead vocals (4, 6, 8, 10); guitars (2, 4, 6, 8); bass guitar (4, 11, 12); sitar (1); organ (1, 5, 11); piano (3, 4, 8, 10, 12); harmonium (4, 8); electric piano (7); flute (9); backing vocals (1, 4, 7–8, 10, 12)
- Malcolm Le Maistre - harpsichord (1); percussion (1, 5); bass guitar (2); kazoo (5); whistle (5, 7, 11); mandolin (6, 11); tenor recorder (9); bouzouki (10); glockenspiel (12), harmonica (12), organ (12), clarinet (12); backing vocals (1, 5–7, 12)
- Licorice McKechnie - lead vocals (3, 9, 12); organ (1, 2, 6, 8); harmonium (1), percussion (1, 7, 10–11); bass guitar (5); kazoo (5); autoharp (11); bironne (11); backing vocals (1–3, 6, 7, 9–10, 12)
- Robin Williamson - lead vocals (1–2, 5, 7, 9, 12); oud (1), violin (1, 4), whistle (1), cymbal (1); guitars (2, 7, 12); cello (4, 8); oboe (4, 6, 12); mandolin (5, 10); kazoo (5); bass guitar (6); percussion (7); bass recorder (9); fiddle (11); flute (12); banjo (12); string arrangements (12); backing vocals (2, 5, 6, 9–10, 12)

with:

- Gerry Conway, drums (2, 6, 7)
- Stan Lee, pedal steel guitar (1); bass guitar (7)

== Charts ==
Chart	Entry date	Peak position	Weeks charted
UK Albums Chart	30 October 1971	46	1
The Billboard 200	19 February 1972	189	3
