= A Very Cellular Song =

Song by the Incredible String Band

from the album The Hangman's Beautiful Daughter
- Released: March 1968
- Recorded: December 1967 at Sound Techniques, London
- Genre: Psychedelic folk
- Length: 13:09
- Label: Elektra / WEA
- Songwriter: Mike Heron
- Producer: Joe Boyd

"A Very Cellular Song" is a song by the Incredible String Band, written by Mike Heron, released on the 1968 album The Hangman's Beautiful Daughter.

== Composition and musical structure ==
The longest number on the album, the song is a 13-minute reflection on life, love, and amoebas, whose complex structure incorporates a Bahamian spiritual ("I Bid You Goodnight", originally recorded by the Pinder Family). Heron next sings a passage beginning "Who would lose and who would bruise", whose tune is to be reprised later on in the piece. This is followed by an ode to mitosis, sung from the point of view of an amoeba, introduced by Licorice McKechnie saying the words "Amoebas are very small".

The numerous parts of the song are woven together by Heron's harpsichord sections and Williamson's instrumental passages on the gimbri and Jew's harp. Heron later said of the song, "All it was was a trip, and that was the music I was listening to, that and interspersed with Radio 4, bits of plays, people talking to each other, and I happened to be listening to the Pinder Family before I started."

=== May the Long Time Sun Shine ===
The last part of "A Very Cellular Song", "May the Long Time Sun Shine", is sometimes wrongly referred to as a Sikh hymn or an Irish blessing, but is in fact an original song written by Mike Heron.

== Commentary ==
Writer Dan Lander described the song as Mike Heron's masterpiece. He wrote:

"Weaving between styles as divergent as Bahamian funerary music, East Indian incantation and ancient Celtic mysticism, 'A Very Cellular Song' represents a high point in the band's creativity and surely influenced a host of others including Led Zeppelin, the Who and Lou Reed. Handclaps, kazoo, harpsichord and pipes intermingle and morph into each other. If this sounds like dissonance and chaos, it is. However, it holds together and in the end conveys a powerful range of human emotion through pain and joy and back again."

== Cover versions ==
- The amoeba section was covered by actor Nigel Planer, in character as 'Neil the Hippy' from Television show The Young Ones on the LP Neil's Heavy Concept Album, released in 1984.
