= The Chelsea Sessions 1967 =

Compilation album by The Incredible String Band
- Released: 7 October 1997
- Recorded: Sound Techniques, Chelsea, London February 1967, 1968
- Genre: Psychedelic folk; folk
- Length: 49:36
- Label: Pig's Whisker
- Producer: Joe Boyd

The Incredible String Band chronology
BBC Radio 1 Live in Concert (1992)	The Chelsea Sessions 1967 (1997)	First Girl I Loved: Live in Canada 1972 (2001)

The Chelsea Sessions 1967 is a compilation album by the Scottish psychedelic folk group the Incredible String Band, which compiles their demo recordings prior to their second studio album, The 5000 Spirits or the Layers of the Onion. Other tracks were also produced during the Wee Tam and the Big Huge sessions in 1968. The sessions were first uncovered by Island Records in 1985. The early productions were one of the first known recordings with Mike Heron and Robin Williamson as a duo.

== Background ==
Recording began in October 1966 at Sound Techniques Studios as works in progress for the band's second album. Williamson had returned from his travels in Morocco to reform the band with Heron under their producer, Joe Boyd. Of the 13 demos, six were included on the album. The compositions, in general, were similar to what the band released on their first two albums. The arrangements, in their beginning stages, are simpler instrumentally compared to the band's complex, final product. The lyrics and rhythm also differ, most obviously on "The Mad Hatter's Song" and "Blues for the Muse". The demos were mainly solo efforts by Heron and Williamson as their contributions were relative to whoever composed the track. Of the seven tracks that do not appear on the second album, "Iron Stone" is the only one to appear on any studio album by the band. The demo of "Iron Stone" is the first take and lacks the last instrumental section, but includes lyrics not on the album version. Two tracks, "God Dog" and "Lover Man", were not released by the band, but were later covered by other artists. "God Dog", which features Dolly Collins on flute organ, was left out of 5000 Layers as it did not fit the album's style, and was later covered by Shirley Collins and Dolly Collins on their album, Anthems in Eden. "Lover Man" was considered too similar to "Painting Box", but was covered on Al Stewart's album, Bedsitter Images. The remaining four tracks were previously unreleased material not completed for any studio album.

The album was released on 7 October 1997 on the Pig's Whisker label. The cover by Chris Sands is an image of Heron and Williamson outside the recording studio walls in the beginning stages of development. Liner notes offer in-depth analysis of the sessions, and the demos created. The album has been reissued several times, most notably the 2000 reissue which includes a bonus track.

== Track listing ==
1. Lover Man - 2:58
2. Born in Your Town - 4:30
3. First Girl I Loved - 4:58
4. Gently Tender - 4:47
5. Little Could - 4:01
6. Blues for the Muse - 3:49
7. The Eyes of Fate - 3:59
8. The Mad Hatter's Song - 4:58
9. Alice Is a Long Time Gone - 2:58
10. See Your Face and Know You - 2:37
11. Frutch - 3:55
12. The Iron Stone - 3:27
13. God Dog - 2:42
