= The 5000 Spirits or the Layers of the Onion =

Studio album by the Incredible String Band
- Released: July 1967
- Recorded: 1967
- Studios: Sound Techniques, Chelsea, London
- Genre: Psychedelic folk
- Length: 50:10
- Label: Elektra / WEA
- Producer: Joe Boyd

Incredible String Band chronology
The Incredible String Band (1966)	The 5000 Spirits or the Layers of the Onion (1967)	The Hangman's Beautiful Daughter (1968)

Professional ratings
Review scores
Source	Rating
AllMusic	4.5/5 stars
Pitchfork	7.3/10
Rolling Stone	3/5 stars

The 5000 Spirits or the Layers of the Onion is the second album by the Scottish psychedelic folk group the Incredible String Band (ISB). It was released in July 1967 on Elektra Records. The album was recorded following the reformation of the band as a duo consisting of Robin Williamson and Mike Heron. Notably, the album was a change in musical direction for the two as they transitioned from their more conventional folk music structures into complex psychedelic compositions influenced by British folk and Indian music.

Upon release, the album peaked at number 25 on the UK Albums Charts, and failed to chart on the Billboard 200. It was preceded by the single, "Painting Box", in June 1967 which evidently failed to chart. An additional promo single, "Way Back in the Sixties" was also released in support of the album. The album established the band within the British folk scene, while also gaining them an underground presence in the United States. At the time of its release, the album was recognised as being ambitious, and for creating a contrasting sound to other musical acts who were also utilising similar instruments at the time.

== Background ==
The ISB came to prominence in the UK in June 1966, as a result of the release of their debut album, The Incredible String Band, which incorporated more conventional folk tracks in comparison to their later work. It bestowed upon the group a "Folk Album of the Year" award in Melody Maker's annual poll, but members Robin Williamson and Clive Palmer left England following its release. In late 1966, Williamson returned from leave, in which time he ventured to Morocco with his then-girlfriend, Licorice McKechnie. With his arrival, Williamson brought back a wide variety of exotic instruments of African and Middle Eastern origin. Mike Heron, as well, had begun to broaden his musical horizons by experimenting with the sitar in Williamson's absence. Williamson reformed the ISB with Heron, but not with founding member Palmer, who was still travelling in Afghanistan. As a duo, the two rehearsed early versions of the material that configured their second album. Crudely recorded on a tape recorder and a single microphone, rehearsals took place in Balmore between October 1966 and February 1967, in a period that was charged by extensive discussions between Williamson and Heron over the instrumental arrangements of the new material.

Shortly afterwards, in early 1967 the two-piece ISB became regulars on the London folk scene as an opening act in local venues, with a set list that featured the upcoming album's songs. Nearly as exotic as their instruments, Williamson, interested in multi-media, hired two dancers known as Mimi & Lesandra (incorrectly deemed Mimi & Mouse) to take part in the band's concerts. Promotion of the ISB's songs saw the ISB performing "Chinese White" on BBC's Late Night Line-up, and was capped off by a brief appearance at the Newport Folk Festival. Following the band's short touring schedule, their record producer, Joe Boyd, who had previously worked with the group on their debut album, returned to undergo developments for the duo's second album.

Following further rehearsal periods (recordings of the resulting demos were later released as The Chelsea Sessions 1967), the ISB completed the entire album at Sound Techniques, Chelsea, London in early 1967. The recordings were conducted on four-track, in the first instances of the duo overdubbing, and multi-tracking their wide assortment of instrumentals that included sitar, gimbri, and mandolin. Much of the instrumentals drew upon influences of the psychedelic genre, along with the foreign playing Williamson witnessed in his travels. Williamson and Heron's compositions were eccentric in nature, relating with themes of mythology, life, and religion. For the recordings, session musicians were featured, such as Nazir Jairazbhoy on sitar, Pentangle's Danny Thompson on double bass, and on piano was counter-culture activist John "Hoppy" Hopkins. Future ISB member McKechnie also made her first contributions to the band, appearing as a vocalist and a percussionist.

Although several other musical acts, including The Beatles and The Rolling Stones, had already begun incorporating sitar into their compositions, the ISB featured Jairazbhoy, a musician who was traditionally taught with the instrument, rather than a western instrumentalist. Williamson also drew inspiration from his time in Morocco, becoming influenced by the song structures and vocal techniques. The album's compositions reflected upon these developments, Williamson's adaption of the Arabian oud to the guitar, and the vocal arabesques being major stylistic points in the album's overall sound.

== Release ==
The 5000 Spirits or the Layers of the Onion was released in early July 1967 on the Elektra label to the UK (catalogue item EUK 257), and the US (catalogue item EUK 4010). In advance of the album's release, John Peel played large excerpts from it on his Radio London show The Perfumed Garden. The album was more successful than the ISB's debut, peaking at number 25 on the UK Albums Chart and number one on the UK Folk Chart, in part due to Peel's support. Its cover, designed by Dutch artists Simon Postuma and Marijke Koger, better known as The Fool, featured a multi-coloured hermaphrodite juxtaposing both light and darkness. Two singles preceded the album's release, both of which were issued in June 1967, only to the UK. "Painting Box" then "Way Back in the Sixties" managed to promote the diversity in the band's lyrics and instrumentals, but failed to chart in the UK.

5000 Spirits was much admired by Paul McCartney, who named it his favourite album of 1967. In 1968, Judy Collins recorded "First Boy I Loved" (a cover of Williamson's "First Girl I Loved" with the sex switched) for Who Knows Where the Time Goes. In 1990, Jackson Browne also covered "First Girl I Loved" for the Elektra compilation Rubáiyát. David Bowie named the album among his top 25 albums of all time.

== Track listing ==
Side A
No.	Title	Writer(s)	Length
1.	"Chinese White"	Mike Heron	3:40
2.	"No Sleep Blues"	Robin Williamson	3:53
3.	"Painting Box"	Heron	4:04
4.	"The Mad Hatter's Song"	Williamson	5:40
5.	"Little Cloud"	Heron	4:05
6.	"The Eyes of Fate"	Williamson	4:02

Side B
No.	Title	Writer(s)	Length
1.	"Blues for the Muse"	Williamson	2:49
2.	"The Hedgehog's Song"	Heron	3:30
3.	"First Girl I Loved"	Williamson	4:55
4.	"You Know What You Could Be"	Heron	2:46
5.	"My Name Is Death"	Williamson	2:46
6.	"Gently Tender"	Heron	4:49
7.	"Way Back in the 1960s"	Williamson	3:11

== Personnel ==
- Robin Williamson - vocals, guitar, mandolin, oud, bowed and bass gimbri, flute, percussion (drums, rattles)
- Mike Heron - vocals, guitar, harmonica
- Licorice McKechnie - vocals, percussion
- Danny Thompson - double bass
- John Hopkins - piano
- Nazir Jairazbhoy (credited as Soma) - sitar, tanpura

== Chart positions ==
Chart (1967)	Peak position
UK Albums Chart	25
