= U (Incredible String Band album) =

Studio album by the Incredible String Band
- Released: October 1970
- Recorded: May 1970
- Genres: Psychedelic folk; folk rock; folk
- Length: 107:07
- Label: Elektra / WEA
- Producer: Joe Boyd

The Incredible String Band chronology
I Looked Up (1970)	U (1970)	Be Glad for the Song Has No Ending (1971)

Professional ratings
Review scores
Source	Rating
AllMusic	3/5 stars

U is a double album, the seventh studio album overall, by the British psychedelic folk group the Incredible String Band (ISB) and was released on Elektra Records in October 1970. The majority of the material featured on the album was taken from the mixed-media production of the same name, which saw the band backed by the dancing troupe the Stone Monkey. The concept of U derived from the ISB's fascination and subsequent conversion to Scientology in 1969.

Although the show, along with the songs, were seen as ambitious, U was a commercial failure for the ISB. The album managed to chart at number 183 on the Billboard 200, fairing considerably better in the UK where it peaked at number 34 on the UK Albums Charts.

== Background ==
In 1969, after researching its concepts, the members of the ISB had joined the Church of Scientology, and expressed some of their changing views on their subsequent studio album, Changing Horses, later in the year. In November 1969, at the Hotel Chelsea in New York City, the ISB met two ex-members of David Medalla's kinetic art group the Exploding Galaxy, after the troupe unsuccessfully tried to negotiate a recording contract with MGM Records. Former members Malcolm Le Maistre and Rakis, as well as their newly formed dance ensemble the Stone Monkey, took residency at the ISB's commune in Glen Row to help the band, especially Robin Williamson, realise their vision for a multi-media stage act.

Described as a "surreal parable in song and dance" by Williamson, U was "neither a pageant, a play, dance, theater, nor pantomime, though there were elements of all of those" in the show. For the plot, Williamson explained "the vague notion was, a soul incarnates out of nowhere, lives, and then vanishes again at the other end. Hence the idea 'U'", although the performances themselves hardly followed a coherent storyline. On 8 April 1970 the three-hour U show opened at London's Roundhouse where it ran for ten consecutive days. As many as 12 dancers accompanied the band on stage; the dancing aspect was reminiscent of the group's early performing days with the duo Mimi and Mouse. Another booking, this time for six days at the Fillmore West in San Francisco, came at the ISB's own expense, and the financial fallout forced the group to complete the shows without the Stone Monkey in a standard concert format.

In an attempt to recoup the financial losses of the "U" show, record producer Joe Boyd booked the band, along with session musicians Janet Shankman, Peter Grant, and Maistre, into a San Francisco studio to record the nearly two hours of material that is featured on the double album. U was recorded in just 48 hours; Williamson recalled "We just went day and night for two days and two nights, in shifts, and finished. I can't remember what the reasons were, but we had to be done in a hurry. In a way, it seemed to fit". Regardless of the time constraints, the album still contained characteristically complex instrumentals and overdubbing. The music on the album was taken from the songs the band performed on the U tour, showcasing a staggering diversity of psychedelia, folk rock, and traditional folk arrangements long associated with the group, as well as new, highly progressive elements.

== Release ==
U was released in October 1970 on the Elektra label (catalogue item 7E-2002 in the US, catalogue item 2665 001 in the UK). In the US, the album peaked at number 183 on the Billboard 200, remaining on the charts for three weeks, and on the UK Albums Charts it managed to reach number 34 during a two-week stay. Also, in Melody Maker magazine the album charted in the top 20, before dropping off in a few weeks. The album's cover by Shankman was literal interpretation of the show as it featured a mult-colored "U". Inside the gatefold sleeve were photographs depicting the band and the Stone Monkeys in the midst of a performance of the "U" show.

== Track listing ==
All tracks are written by Robin Williamson except where noted.

Disc 1
No.	Title	Writer(s)	Length
1.	"El Wool Suite"	Mike Heron	8:31
2.	"The Juggler's Song"		3:13
3.	"Time"		3:58
4.	"Bad Sadie Lee"	Janet Shankman	3:49
5.	"Queen of Love"		8:37
6.	"Partial Belated Overture"	Heron	2:56
7.	"Light in Time of Darkness/Glad to See You"	Heron	10:16
8.	"Walking Along With You"	Heron	3:59
9.	"Hirem Pawnitof/Fairies' Hornpipe"	Traditional, arr. Heron	6:20
10.	"Bridge Theme"	Heron	2:18

Disc 2
No.	Title	Writer(s)	Length
1.	"Bridge Song"	Heron	8:49
2.	"Astral Plane Theme"		4:52
3.	"Invocation"		4:49
4.	"Robot Blues"		4:09
5.	"Puppet Song"		6:16
6.	"Cutting The Strings"		5:10
7.	"I Know You"	Licorice McKechnie	3:24
8.	"Rainbow"	Heron	15:41

== Personnel ==
"El Wool Suite":

- Mike Heron – sitar;
- Robin Williamson – gimbri, flute, clay drums;
- Rose Simpson – tabla, guitar

"The Juggler's Song":

- Robin Williamson – vocal, guitar, bass, mandolin;
- Licorice McKechnie – vocal

"Time":

- Robin Williamson – vocal, 12-string guitar, mandolin

"Bad Sadie Lee":

- Janet Shankman – vocal;
- Mike Heron – piano, vocal;
- Robin Williamson – fiddle, Jew's harp, washboard, vocal;
- Licorice McKechnie – vocal;
- Rose Simpson – vocal;
- Peter Grant – banjo

"Queen of Love":

- Robin Williamson – vocal, guitar, bass;
- Janet Shankman – harpsichord;
- Tom Constanten – arranger

"Partial Belated Overture":

- Mike Heron – piano, guitar;
- Robin Williamson – shanai, fiddle;
- Rose Simpson – bass

"Light in Time of Darkness / Glad to See You":

- Mike Heron – vocal, piano;
- Rose Simpson – bass

"Walking Along with You":

- Rose Simpson – vocal;
- Mike Heron – guitar, vocal;
- Robin Williamson – bass

"Hirem Pawnitof / Fairies' Hornpipe":

- Mike Heron – vocal, guitar, mandolin;
- Robin Williamson – fiddle;
- Licorice McKechnie – spoons;
- Rose Simpson – bass

"Bridge Theme":

- Mike Heron – guitar;
- Robin Williamson – shanai, soondri;
- Licorice McKechnie – drums;
- Rose Simpson – bass

"Bridge Song":

- Licorice McKechnie – vocal;
- Mike Heron – guitar, vocal;
- Robin Williamson – lead guitar, vocal;
- Rose Simpson – bass, vocal

"Astral Plane Theme":

- Robin Williamson – guitar

"Invocation":

- Robin Williamson – Greg Heat's voice sitar

"Robot Blues":

- Robin Williamson – vocal, piano

"Puppet Song":

- Robin Williamson – vocal, guitar

"Cutting the Strings":

- Robin Williamson – vocal, guitar, mandolin, gimbri, fiddle, flute;
- Licorice McKechnie – vocal;
- Mike Heron – sitar

"I Know You":

- Licorice McKechnie – vocal, guitar

"Rainbow":

- Mike Heron – vocal, piano, organ, guitar, bass;
- Robin Williamson – drums, vocals, soondri, fiddle, flute, mandolin;
- Licorice McKechnie – vocals, drums;
- Rose Simpson – vocals, bass;
- Mal and Malcolm – vocals

== Charts ==
Chart performance for U
Chart	Entry date	Peak position
UK Albums Chart	31 October 1970	34
US Billboard 200	23 January 1971	183
