= Hard Rope & Silken Twine =

Studio album by The Incredible String Band
- Released: March 1974 (UK) / June 1974 (US)
- Recorded: 1974
- Genre: Folk
- Length: 43:51
- Label: Island Records (UK) / Reprise Records (US)
- Producer: Mike Heron

The Incredible String Band chronology
No Ruinous Feud (1973)	Hard Rope & Silken Twine (1974)

Professional ratings
Review scores
Source	Rating
Allmusic	2.5/5 stars

Hard Rope & Silken Twine is the twelfth and final album released by the first incarnation of The Incredible String Band. Released in 1974, the album features original ISB members, Robin Wlliamson and Mike Heron, supplemented by pedal steel guitarist, Stan Lee; electric guitarist, Brian Forbes; Malcolm le Maistre on vocals and Jack Ingram on drums.

Heron's melodic opening track, 'Maker of Islands,' ranks among the finest love songs in the String Band's recorded output.

Williamson's 'Cold February' was originally written about the lengthy period of political and religious violence in Northern Ireland euphemistically known as 'The Troubles.' He was persuaded to alter the lyrics to broaden the song's appeal by removing any direct references to Northern Ireland. The song remains a powerful anthem for peace and stands alongside the best of the String Band's songs.

Williamson's 'Dreams of No Return,' about the end of a relationship, represents a last gasp of what the String Band sounded like when it consisted of just Mike and Robin and their girlfriends, Rose Simpson and Licorice McKechnie.

The final track, 'Ithkos,' is nearly 20 minutes long and made up of several thematically linked pieces, mostly written by Heron. These range from Greek roots to folk, then progressive rock, and end with the addition of synthesizers. Such lengthy compositions were common for the band during their heyday. The track's theme of a voyage in the Greek arm of the Mediterranean Sea was influenced by the String Band's adherence to Scientology at the time the album was made, at which time the founder of Scientology, L. Ron Hubbard, was living on a yacht and sailing among the Greek Islands.

Overall the album contains original folk-influenced songs mixed with progressive rock influences. These attempts at changing the band's sound proved commercially unsuccessful and, after low sales, the band was dropped from its label. Musical differences created continuing turmoil that led to the band dissolving by October of the same year.

Robin moved to California, forming the Merry Band, later returning to the UK to launch a successful solo career that continues to the present day. Mike remained in the Scottish borders, pursuing a more sporadic solo career that has seen him rediscovered by new generations of musicians.

== Track listing ==
No.	Title	Writer(s)	Length
1.	"Maker of Islands"	Mike Heron	6:01
2.	"Cold February"	Robin Williamson	5:46
3.	"Glancing Love"	Malcolm Le Maistre, Mike Garson	4:00
4.	"Dreams of No Return"	Williamson	5:20
5.	"Dumb Kate"	Heron	3:21
6.	"Ithkos"	Heron	19:23
Total length:			43:51

== Personnel ==
Technical

- Wayne Anderson – Illustrator

== Chart Listing ==
In the Bubbling Under the Top LPs list on the Billboard 200, the album topped at No. 208.
