= Smiling Men with Bad Reputations =

Studio album by Mike Heron
- Released: April 30, 1971
- Recorded: December 1970
- Studio: Sound Techniques, Chelsea, London
- Genre: Rock • folk • folk rock
- Length: 45:39
- Label: Island UK; Elektra US
- Producer: Joe Boyd

Mike Heron chronology
Smiling Men with Bad Reputations (1971)	Mike Heron's Reputation (1975)

Professional ratings
Review scores
Source	Rating
Allmusic	4.5/5 stars

Smiling Men with Bad Reputations is the 1971 solo debut album by Mike Heron of the Incredible String Band (ISB).

Listeners of The Incredible String Band can look here for what would be Heron's influence on future ISB albums. The trademark folk and Celtic style remained influential, but Heron added his own influences of progressive rock to the repertoire. This, more or less, was his attempt at creating a commercialized sound to his music. Tracks like "Feast of Stephen" are clear evidence that Heron desired to create rock-orientated pieces contrasting somewhat with others like "Flowers of the Forest", with Richard Thompson on lead guitar. Heron's output would continue to show a trend in this direction for much of his solo career, and his remaining time with the ISB.

"Warm Heart Pastry" finds Heron backed by Pete Townshend, Keith Moon of The Who, and Ronnie Lane of Small Faces (as Tommy & The Bijoux).

The 1991 reissue features two bonus tracks, with Jimmy Page guesting on "Lady Wonder" and Elton John on "Make No Mistake".

== Track listing ==
All tracks on the original album composed by Mike Heron.

1. "Call Me Diamond"
2. "Flowers of the Forest"
3. "Audrey"
4. "Brindaban"
5. "Feast of Stephen"
6. "Spirit Beautiful"
7. "Warm Heart Pastry"
8. "Beautiful Stranger"
9. "No Turning Back"

Smiling Men with Bad Reputations was remastered and reissued in 2004 with two bonus tracks:

10. "Make No Mistake" – 3:09
11. "Lady Wonder" – 4:20

== Personnel ==
- Mike Heron - Lead Vocals, Acoustic Guitar, Harmonica
- John Cale - Bass (3,5), Guitar (5), Vocals (5), Harmonium (3,8), Piano (5,8), Viola (5,7), Vocal Arrangement (5), Brass Arrangement (8)
- Dave Mattacks - Drums (2,10,11)
- Rose Simpson - Bass (2)
- Richard Thompson - Guitar (2)
- Steve Winwood - Organ (2)
- Pete Townshend - Guitar (7)
- Keith Moon - Drums (7)
- Ronnie Lane - Bass (7)
- Elton John - Piano (10)
- Jimmy Page - Guitar & slide guitar (11)
- Simon Nicol - Guitar (1,5)
- Dave Pegg - Bass (1,10,11)
- Gerry Conway - Drums (5,8)
- Tony Cox - VCS3 Synthesizer (8)
- Pat Donaldson - Bass (8)
- Dr. Strangely Strange - Backing Vocals (6)
- Sue Glover - Vocals (5)
- Mike Kowalski - Drums (1)
- Sunny Leslie - Vocals (5)
- Dudu Pukwana - Saxophone (1), Piano (1), Horn Arrangement (1)
- Gerard Dott - Arrangement (4)
- Liza Strike - Vocals (5)
- Heather Wood - Vocals (6)
- Vemu Mukunda - Veena (6)
- Mohana Lakshmipathy - Veena (6)
- Vshailendra - Tambura (6)
- PR Money - Mridangam & Morsing (6)
- Gordon Huntley - Steel guitar (10)
