= Wee Tam and the Big Huge =

Studio album by the Incredible String Band
- Released: November 1968
- Recorded: April–August 1968
- Studios: Sound Techniques, Chelsea, London
- Genres: Psychedelic folk; Scottish folk
- Length: 86:48
- Label: Elektra / Warner Music Group
- Producer: Joe Boyd

The Incredible String Band chronology
The Hangman's Beautiful Daughter (1968)	Wee Tam and the Big Huge (1968)	Changing Horses (1969)

Professional ratings
Review scores
Source	Rating
Allmusic	3.5/5 stars
Pitchfork Media	(8.1/10)
Rolling Stone	(positive)

Wee Tam and the Big Huge is the fourth album by the Scottish psychedelic folk group the Incredible String Band, released in 1968 by Elektra Records as both a double LP (in Europe) and separate single LPs (in the US) known individually as Wee Tam and The Big Huge.

Consisting of a varied selection of songs by Robin Williamson and Mike Heron, the album features eclectic arrangements and structures. Around 15 instruments were employed, played mainly by Williamson and Heron but occasionally, in supporting roles, by Rose Simpson and Licorice McKechnie.

== Title ==
Williamson explained the title as follows: "I saw a man with a huge big dog, [and] we knew somebody called Wee Tam, in Edinburgh. It seemed like it was a good idea in terms of one person looking up at the stars; Wee Tam and the Big Huge. Just like the vastness of the universe".

== Background ==
The Incredible String Band were fairly busy in the latter half of 1968. With their popularity and reputation growing on both sides of the Atlantic, they began selling out large venues like the Fillmore and the Royal Albert Hall. As Heron explains, "...we were touring maybe six months of the year and by that time we all lived together, in eight cottages joined together in this place called Glen Row. When we were not on the road we were either in the studio or playing each other songs we'd written. So it came out of the experience of just being in each other's company all the time". With their recent exposure to the musical style of the U.S., the band returned to Britain hoping to incorporate both their British and American influences. The internal politics of the band also changed as Heron and Williamson each desired to have a say on one another's arrangements. More important was the emergence of Simpson balancing out the role of McKechnie, which further developed into a positive effect on the band. With the incorporation of the two new personnel, live performances could more closely resemble album pieces, which was in the band's mind as Wee Tam and the Big Huge was simpler in comparison to its predecessor.

Recording took place between April and August 1968 on an intermittent basis at Sound Techniques Studios in Chelsea, London. The tracks were more conventional in concept, but the band still continued to use eastern instrumentals in the album's development. Wee Tam and the Big Huge, like the band's past albums, exudes a specific message of serenity, harmony, and overall well-being. The album had an optimistic outlook on life, nature, and the universe while retaining a sense of eclecticism. Heron and Williamson's interaction on each other's compositions also played a large role, noticeable on the instrumental development of the tracks. The whole process was completed with less overdubbing than on past albums, due to the more standard arrangements and lengthier recording period.

== Release ==
In November 1968, Wee Tam and the Big Huge was released by Elektra Records as EKL 4036. In the UK, the album was released as a double LP, but in the U.S. the two disks were released individually as Wee Tam and The Big Huge. This affected sales and chart position in the U.S., but, more importantly, it diluted the single thematic continuum the band had expected the album would express. The front and back covers were featured as both covers and lyric sheets as the design simply showed the lyrics of all the tracks. For the individual albums, there are images of Williamson and Heron posing in a garden. The inside of the gatefold sleeve presents a poem by Williamson along with accompanying pictures on each fold. Upon release, the album, again, earned the band success in the UK, but after the decision by Elektra's American office to split the album, the sales fared less successfully. Still, Wee Tam managed to reach number 174 on the Billboard 200, and The Big Huge also charted at number 180.

== Track listing ==
=== Disc one (Wee Tam) ===
Side A
No.	Title	Writer(s)	Length
1.	"Job's Tears"	Williamson	6:40
2.	"Puppies"	Heron	5:30
3.	"Beyond the See"	Heron	2:16
4.	"The Yellow Snake"	Williamson	2:04
5.	"Log Cabin Home in the Sky"	Heron	4:00

Side B
No.	Title	Writer(s)	Length
6.	"You Get Brighter"	Heron	5:44
7.	"The Half-Remarkable Question"	Williamson	5:01
8.	"Air"	Heron	3:12
9.	"Ducks on a Pond"	Williamson	9:17

=== Disc two (The Big Huge) ===
Side A
No.	Title	Writer(s)	Length
10.	"Maya"	Williamson	9:24
11.	"Greatest Friend"	Heron	3:30
12.	"The Son of Noah's Brother"	Williamson	0:16
13.	"Lordly Nightshade"	Williamson	5:13
14.	"The Mountain of God"	Williamson	1:51

Side B
No.	Title	Writer(s)	Length
15.	"Cousin Caterpillar"	Heron	5:15
16.	"The Iron Stone"	Williamson	6:33
17.	"Douglas Traherne Harding"	Heron	6:15
18.	"The Circle Is Unbroken"	Williamson	4:47

== Personnel ==
- Robin Williamson – lead vocals (1, 4, 7, 9, 10, 12–14, 16, 18), guitar (1, 2, 4, 7, 9–13, 16), bass guitar (2, 3, 10, 15), gimbri (2, 3), percussion (2, 7, 9, 17), sarangi (4), violin (5, 17), harpsichord (6), piano (9, 13), Hammond organ (14), flute (8), kazoo (9), tin whistle (3, 13, 17, 18), harmonica (11), Irish harp (18), drums (13), backing vocals
- Mike Heron – lead vocals (2, 5, 6, 8, 11, 15, 17), guitar (2, 5, 6, 8, 15, 17), sitar (2, 4, 7, 10, 16), bass guitar (2), organ (3, 8, 12, 18), harpsichord (3), washboard (5), percussion (9, 13), harmonica (9), backing vocals
- Rose Simpson – violin (5), percussion (10, 15, 16), backing vocals
- Licorice McKechnie – percussion (10, 16), Irish harp (16), backing vocals

== Chart positions ==
Chart	Album	Entry date	Peak position
The Billboard 200	Wee Tam	22 March 1969	174
The Billboard 200	The Big Huge	22 March 1969	180
