= No Ruinous Feud =

Studio album by The Incredible String Band
- Released: March 1973
- Recorded: January 1973
- Genres: Folk, pop
- Length: 38:42
- Label: Island
- Producers: Roger Mayer, Mike Heron

The Incredible String Band chronology
Earthspan (1972)	No Ruinous Feud (1973)	Hard Rope & Silken Twine (1974)

Professional ratings
Review scores
Source	Rating
Allmusic	3/5 stars

No Ruinous Feud is the eleventh album released by The Incredible String Band in 1973.

This album features the band's folk songs along with new approaches toward reggae pop and rock beats. Tracks like "My Blue Tears" and "Second Fiddle" are evidence of this. Mike Heron would even go as far as abandoning the use of his six-string wire-strung acoustic guitar, custom built by John Bailey.

This is also the first album after the departure of Licorice McKechnie. She would be replaced by Gerard Dott.

== Track listing ==
No.	Title	Writer(s)	Length
1.	"Explorer"	Mike Heron	3:28
2.	"Down Before Cathay"	Malcolm Le Maistre	4:16
3.	"Saturday Maybe"	Robin Williamson	2:45
4.	"Jigs"	Traditional, arr. Williamson	2:50
5.	"Old Buccaneer"	Williamson	3:23
6.	"At The Lighthouse Dance"	Le Maistre	3:30
7.	"Second Fiddle" (cover of Tommy McCook & The Supersonics, 1968)	Duke Reid	2:23
8.	"Circus Girl"	Williamson	2:30
9.	"Turquoise Blue"	Heron	3:59
10.	"My Blue Tears" (cover of Dolly Parton, 1971)	Dolly Parton	2:00
11.	"Weather The Storm"	Williamson	3:02
12.	"Little Girl"	Heron	4:21
