= Earthspan =

Studio album by The Incredible String Band
- Released: November 1972
- Recorded: March – August 1972
- Genre: Folk
- Length: 41:11
- Label: Island
- Producers: Robin Williamson, Mike Heron

The Incredible String Band chronology
Liquid Acrobat as Regards the Air (1971)	Earthspan (1972)	No Ruinous Feud (1973)

Earthspan is the tenth album by The Incredible String Band, released in 1972 on Island Records. It features Mike Heron, Robin Williamson, Licorice McKechnie, and Malcolm Le Maistre.

The core of Robin Williamson and Mike Heron remained intact, but was faltering due to musical indifference. Licorice McKechnie, the remainder of the former girlfriends, would depart after the release of the album.

This album, compared to its predecessors, is a more generic folk album. The band was continuing its exploration into progressive rock and synthesizers in order to create a more commercial-oriented sound. This was due more to Heron's influence over the band. As a result, the band would lose much of their trademark style that made them popular in the British counterculture of the 1960s.

Most of the tracks on the album take inspiration from European and American tradition. Past albums included such a theme alongside eastern culture.

== Track listing ==
No.	Title	Writer(s)	Length
1.	"My Father Was a Lighthouse Keeper"	Malcolm Le Maistre	4:21
2.	"Antoine"	Mike Heron	3:53
3.	"Restless Night"	Robin Williamson	3:30
4.	"Sunday Song"	Licorice McKechnie, Heron	8:28
5.	"Black Jack David"	traditional	2:38
6.	"Banks of Sweet Italy"	Williamson	3:01
7.	"The Actor"	Le Maistre, Williamson	3:49
8.	"Moon Hang Low"	Williamson	3:22
9.	"Sailor and the Dancer"	Le Maistre	2:34
10.	"Seagull"	Heron	6:02

"Black Jack David", then called "Black Jack Davy" had earlier been recorded by The Incredible String Band on their album I Looked Up on Elektra Records in 1970.
