= I Looked Up =

Studio album by the Incredible String Band
- Released: April 1970
- Genres: Psychedelic folk, folk
- Length: 41:22
- Label: Elektra / WEA
- Producer: Joe Boyd

The Incredible String Band chronology
Changing Horses (1969)	I Looked Up (1970)	U (1970)

Professional ratings
Review scores
Source	Rating
Allmusic	2.5/5 stars

I Looked Up (Elektra EKS 2469 002 / U.S. LP: EKS-74061) is the sixth album by the Incredible String Band. Recorded at a time when the band was busy rehearsing for its ambitious upcoming stage show, U, the album has been described by band member Robin Williamson as a "quickie" album.

== Background ==
Recording of the album came just 5 months after Changing Horses. Like its predecessor, the album included six tracks with two compositions exceeding 10 minutes. As usual with the band, there are several instruments utilised in unique arrangements and overdubbing in the development of the album.

A rewriting of "Black Jack Davey", a Scottish traditional folk song, begins the album, sung by Heron in an uptempo style. The album also contains Robin Williamson's most experimental, "Pictures in a Mirror". The epic, a mixture of folk and drama, tells the story of Lord Randell. Williamson's vocals are prominent on this track for his range and ability to distort his voice. A highlight of the album, Mike Heron's composition "This Moment," is regarded as one of Heron's best pieces.

Dave Mattacks, a drummer of Fairport Convention, is featured on "The Letter", a track which is more reflective of Fairport's electric folk style.

Recording sessions also produced an unreleased track titled "Queen Juanita and Her Fisherman Lover" that is over 16 minutes in length. It would later appear on the compilation Incredible String Band: Tricks of The Senses. Three tracks from the album, "When You Find Out Who You Are ", "The Letter", and "This Moment", were performed at the Woodstock Festival, which constituted half of their set that day.

Many consider I Looked Up an improvement to Changing Horses however the album's chart success was limited and disappointing in the US as it only topped at No. 196.

== Track listing ==
All tracks are written by Mike Heron except as noted.

No.	Title	Writer(s)	Length
1.	"Black Jack Davy"		3:59
2.	"The Letter"		3:08
3.	"Pictures in a Mirror"	Robin Williamson	10:43
4.	"This Moment"		6:07
5.	"When You Find Out Who You Are"	Williamson	10:58
6.	"Fair As You"		6:27
Total length:			41:22

"Black Jack Davy" (then called "Black Jack David") would later be recorded again by the Incredible String Band on their album Earthspan on Island Records in 1972.

== Personnel ==
- Robin Williamson – vocals, guitar, violin, flute, gimbri, percussion
- Mike Heron – vocals, guitar, piano, harpsichord, organ
- Licorice McKechnie – vocals, bass guitar, dulcimer, drums
- Rose Simpson – vocals, bass guitar, violin
- Dave Mattacks – drums

== Charts ==
Chart (1970)	Peak position
UK Albums Chart	30
The Billboard 200	196
