= Malcolm Le Maistre =

British musician

Malcolm Le Maistre (born 21 March 1949) is an English musician, experimental artist and theatre director, who was a member of the Incredible String Band in the 1970s.

== Early life ==
He was born in England; his father a French-born journalist and his mother an American writer. After they split up, he attended boarding school in Surrey, where he developed an interest in experimental theatre.

== Career ==
In 1966, with friend John "Rakis" Koumantarakis, Le Maistre moved to London, where they promoted one of the first concerts by Pink Floyd, and then joined David Medalla's Exploding Galaxy counter-cultural arts and dance troupe.

Le Maistre met Robin Williamson and Mike Heron of the Incredible String Band in New York City in 1968, and returned with Williamson and others to set up a commune in a farmhouse near Newport, Pembrokeshire, Wales. There, they developed ideas for multi-media artistic experiments, and Le Maistre appeared in the BBC TV Omnibus feature on the ISB album, Be Glad for the Song Has No Ending. The same year, he established the Stone Monkey dance and mime troupe, and helped develop the stage show U, which provided the basis of the Incredible String Band album of the same name, released in 1970. In 1971, Rose Simpson left the ISB, and Le Maistre, who had been living with the band and their friends on the Tennant estate near Innerleithen in Scotland, replaced her. He learned to play various musical instruments over the next few months, and contributed as a musician, songwriter and singer to the ISB albums Liquid Acrobat as Regards the Air (1971), Earthspan (1972), No Ruinous Feud (1973), and Hard Rope & Silken Twine (1974).

After the ISB split up in 1974, Le Maistre stayed with Heron as a member of his new band, Mike Heron's Reputation. In the late 1970s, he attempted a solo career, also working with the Enid, and then moved into theatre, forming the Mandarin Theatre Company with Rakis. In 1991, he set up the Environmental Arts Theatre Company, based in Edinburgh, which presented original theatre and song about the environment at schools and other community venues in Scotland. In 1994, he released a solo album, Nothing Strange, later re-released in Germany.

He has continued as a musician, most recently as a member of the Radiant Men. As songwriter and singer of the Barrow Band, he has also prepared teaching material for primary schools on healthy eating. In May 2007, he released an album titled It's Never That Simple, with folk based songs and lyrics about his family's story.
