= Joseph Spence (musician) =

Bahamian guitarist and singer (1910–1984)

- Born: August 3, 1910; Andros, Bahamas
- Died: March 18, 1984 (aged 73); Nassau, Bahamas
- Genres: folk, calypso, blues, Bahamian Rhyming Spiritual
- Instrument: guitar

Joseph Spence (August 3, 1910 – March 18, 1984) was a Bahamian guitarist and singer. He is well known for his vocalizations and humming while playing the guitar. Several American musicians, including Taj Mahal, the Grateful Dead, Ry Cooder, Catfish Keith, Woody Mann, and Olu Dara, as well as the British guitarist John Renbourn, were influenced by and have recorded variations of his arrangements of gospel and Bahamian songs.

== Biography ==
Born in Andros, Bahamas, in 1910, Spence was the son of a pastor. He got his start in music as a teenager playing in his great-uncle Tony Spence's band. After leaving school he worked as a sponge fisher, stonemason, and carpenter, and as a crop cutter in the United States.

The earliest recordings of Spence were made on his porch by the folk musicologist Samuel Charters, in 1958. Charters initially thought that Spence's guitar playing was the work of two players duelling. These recordings were released by Folkways Records on the album Music of the Bahamas Volume One, in 1959.

In 1964, Fritz Richmond travelled to the Bahamas to record Spence, and recordings made in Spence's living room were issued on the album Happy All the Time. The following year, Jody Stecher and Peter Siegel made the trip to record Spence, recording tracks also featuring his sister Edith and her husband Raymond Pinder and their daughter Geneva, which were released on The Real Bahamas Volume One. These tracks included Spence's arrangement of "I Bid You Goodnight", which was covered by the Grateful Dead and Ralph McTell, among others. The album was a success, and as a result Spence toured the United States. A second volume was released in 1978.

Mike Heron, of the Incredible String Band, credited Spence as the inspiration for the "Lay down, dear sister" passage in "A Very Cellular Song" on the album The Hangman's Beautiful Daughter, released in 1968. Curiously, Spence credited Heron with the same song, claiming to have learned it from the Incredible String Band.

Spence released a third album, Good Morning Mr. Walker, in 1972. He performed several more times in the United States during the 1970s.

He died on March 18, 1984, aged 73, in Nassau, Bahamas.

== Musical style ==
Spence's repertoire encompassed calypso, blues, folk music and sacred songs. He played a steel-string acoustic guitar, and nearly all of his recorded songs employ guitar accompaniment in a drop D tuning. The power of his playing derives from moving bass lines and interior voices and a driving beat that he emphasized with foot tapping. To this mix he added blues coloration and calypso rhythms to achieve a unique and easily identifiable sound. He has been called the folk guitarist's Thelonious Monk.

== Legacy ==
Spence's playing inspired the likes of Ry Cooder, Taj Mahal and Jody Stecher.

Several tributes to Spence have been recorded. After his death in 1984 the Richard Thompson fan club produced a benefit tribute album to Spence and the Pinder Family, Out on the Rolling Sea, released on the Green Linnet label and featuring Henry Kaiser, Taj Mahal, and Martin Carthy.

Bahamian musicians KB and Fred Ferguson paid tribute in the song "Riddim and Rhyme". In 1990 Rounder Records released the album Glory, consisting of recordings made of religious music by Guy Droussart.

Spence's recording of "That Glad Reunion Day" was used in the 2004 film Open Water and also appears on its soundtrack album.

Spence's rendition of "Santa Claus Is Comin' to Town" from the 1980 Rounder release Living on the Hallelujah Side has endured as a unique holiday cover. Writing in the Chicago Reader, music critic Peter Margasak describes how Spence "obviously forgot or never knew the song's lyrics, so he crudely spits out a load of gibberish, in perfect time", describing it as "a performance for the ages". It was included in Dr. Demento's festive collection, Holidays in Dementia.

== Discography ==
- 1959: Music of the Bahamas Volume One: Bahamian Folk Guitar, Folkways Records FS 3844
- 1964: Happy All the Time, Elektra Records EKL-273, Carthage Records CGLP 4419 (LP reissue, 1985), Hannibal Records HNCD 4419 (CD reissue, 2003)
- 1972: Joseph Spence: Bahamian Guitarist, "Good Morning Mr. Walker", Arhoolie Records 1061, Arhoolie CD 349 (CD reissue, 1990)
- 1980: Living on the Hallelujah Side, Rounder CD 2021
- 1990: Glory, Rounder CD 2096
- 1992: The Complete Folkways Recordings, 1958, Smithsonian Folkways CD SF 40066
- 1995: The Spring of Sixty-Five, Rounder CD 2114
- 2021: Encore: Unheard Recordings of Bahamian Guitar & Singing, Smithsonian Folkways SFW 40242

=== Compilation appearances ===
- 1964: Folk Guitar, Bahaman Ballads and Rhyming Spirituals, Folkways Records FW03847
- 1966: Explorer Series: The Bahamas – The Real Bahamas, Nonesuch Explorer Series 79725-2
- 1978: Explorer Series: The Bahamas – The Real Bahamas, Vol. 2, Nonesuch Explorer Series 79733-2
- 1995: Kneelin' Down Inside the Gate: The Great Rhyming Singers of the Bahamas, Rounder CD 5035
- 1997: The Bahamas: Islands of Song, Smithsonian Folkways SFW40405
- 2006: Friends of Old Time Music: The Folk Arrival 1961–1965, Smithsonian Folkways SFW40160
