= The Hangman's Beautiful Daughter =

- UK cover artwork

Studio album by the Incredible String Band
- Released: March 1968
- Recorded: December 1967
- Studios: Sound Techniques, London
- Genre: Acid folk
- Length: 49:51
- Label: Elektra / WEA
- Producer: Joe Boyd

The Incredible String Band chronology
The 5000 Spirits or the Layers of the Onion (1967)	The Hangman's Beautiful Daughter (1968)	Wee Tam and the Big Huge (1968)

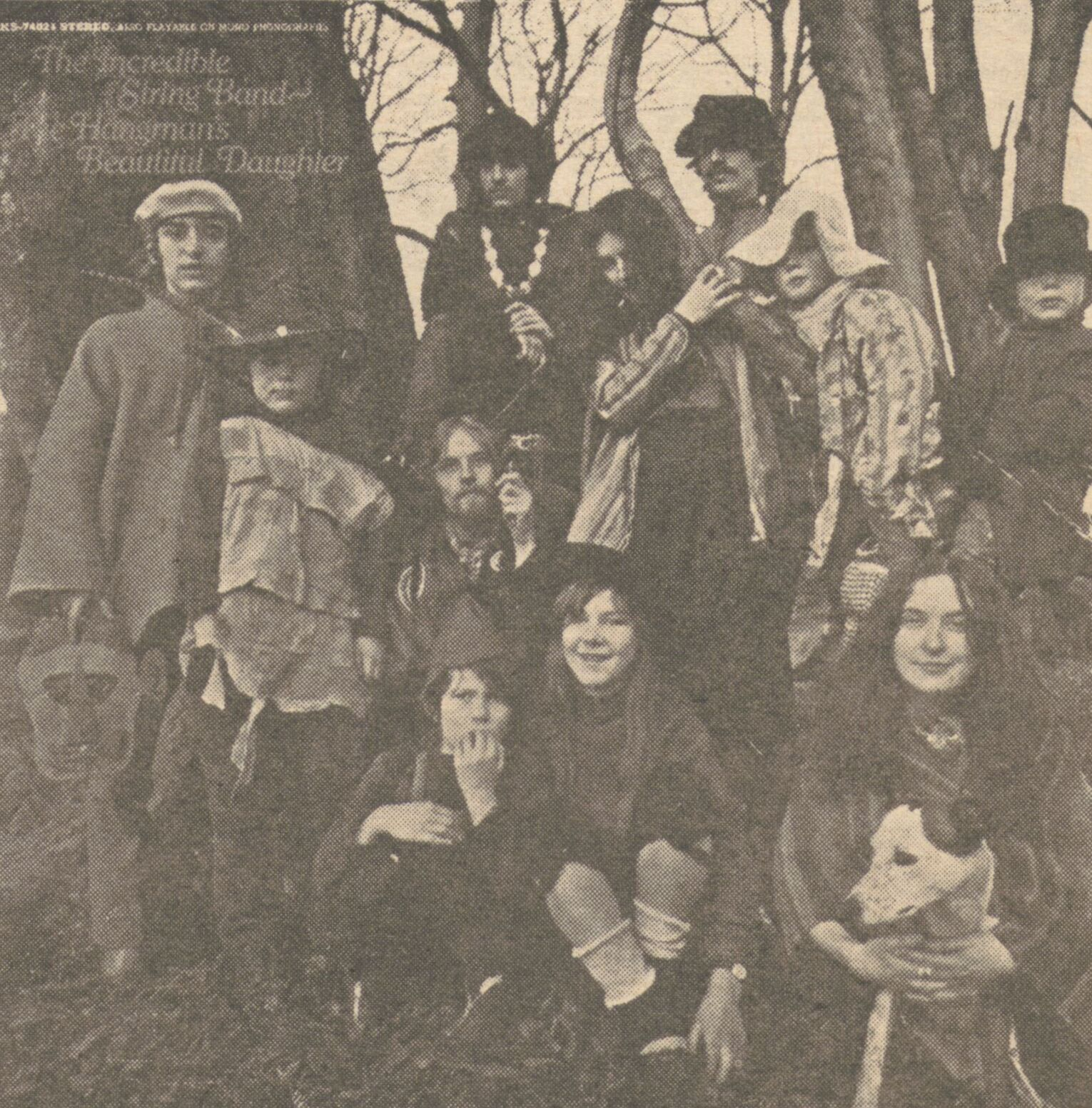
This black-and-white version of the U.S. cover passed into the public domain because Elektra placed it in ads with no copyright notice.

The Hangman's Beautiful Daughter is the third album by Scottish psychedelic folk group the Incredible String Band (ISB), and was released in March 1968 on Elektra Records (see 1968 in music). It saw the band continuing its development of the elements of psychedelic folk and enlarging on past themes, a process they had begun on their previous album, The 5000 Spirits or the Layers of the Onion. Instrumentally, it was the ISB's most complex and experimental album to date, featuring a wide array of exotic instruments. In addition, the album captured the band utilising multi-tracks and overdubbing.

Upon release, the album peaked at number five on the UK Albums Chart and number 161 on the Billboard Top LP's listings in America, becoming the group's highest charting album in both countries. The album brought critical and financial success for the band, including their first solo tour and a Grammy nomination. It was considered their most ambitious work to date and had a large impact on the psychedelic folk genre.

== Background ==
In December 1967, the band completed their Hangman's Beautiful Daughter album at Sound Techniques in Chelsea, London. For the ISB's developments, they attempted to recreate as vividly as possible a live performance of their compositions. Lyrically, the compositions reflected upon past themes of life, mythology, and religious properties in a free musical structure, esotericism becoming a consistent anchor in their recordings.

The album features a series of vividly dreamlike Robin Williamson songs, such as "The Minotaur's Song", a surreal music-hall parody sung from the point of view of the mythical beast. Its centrepiece is Mike Heron's "A Very Cellular Song", a 13-minute reflection on life, love, and amoebas, whose complex structure incorporates a Bahamian spiritual ("I Bid You Goodnight", originally recorded by the Pinder Family). The last part of "A Very Cellular Song", "May the Long Time Sun Shine", is sometimes wrongly referred to as a Sikh hymn or an Irish blessing, but is in fact an original song written by Mike Heron. The album's layered production style employs multitrack recording techniques and a wide array of instruments from across the world, including sitar, gimbri, shenai, oud, harpsichord, panpipes and kazoo.

== Artwork and title ==
The album's cover art – which on original LP issues was the back cover, as the front showed just Williamson and Heron – consists of a photograph taken on Christmas Day 1967. It shows both musicians with their then-girlfriends (and future band members) Licorice McKechnie and Rose Simpson, alongside friends Roger Marshall and Nicky Walton, several children of their friend Mary Stewart, and Robin's dog Leaf.

Regarding the title, Mike Heron said at the time: "The hangman is death and the beautiful daughter is what comes after. Or you might say that the hangman is the past twenty years of our life and the beautiful daughter is now, what we are able to do after all these years. Or you can make up your own meaning – your interpretation is probably just as good as ours."

== Commercial performance ==
Owing largely to the band gaining much airplay from famous DJ John Peel, The Hangman's Beautiful Daughter was a major commercial success in the UK, staying in the charts for 21 weeks with a peak of number 5. In the US, the ISB always remained underground and the album struggled to number 161 during a two-month chart run. It was nominated for a Grammy in the folk music category.

== Legacy and influence ==
Professional ratings
Review scores
Source	Rating
AllMusic	5/5 stars
Pitchfork	9.0/10
Rolling Stone	(unfavourable)
The Rolling Stone Album Guide	5/5 stars
Encyclopedia of Popular Music	4/5 stars

The Hangman's Beautiful Daughter has been widely acclaimed by many critics. It was voted number 406 in the third edition of Colin Larkin's All Time Top 1000 Albums (2000). It appears at number 88 in Joe S. Harrington's Top 100 Albums and was listed by Keenan in The Best Albums Ever...Honest. In its entry in Robert Dimery's book 1001 Albums You Must Hear Before You Die, Max Reinhardt describes the album as "a potent seed of the current 'world music' movement", adding: "[The Hangman's Beautiful Daughter] revealed a sustained grandeur of vision, lyrics, and musicality that the group were never to approach again ... Each track is closer to a suite than a song, as Celtic folk, rock 'n' roll, gospel, plainsong harmonies, near qwaali moments, and North African and Indian sonics all drift effortlessly before the ears." In the February 2016 edition of Uncut magazine it was placed 98th in the top 100 Albums of All Time.

The artwork has been referenced on the cover to David Keenan's book England's Hidden Reverse, Current 93's album cover to their LP Earth Covers Earth, Devendra Banhart's Cripple Crow LP, and Feathers' eponymous debut.

Robert Plant credited The Hangman's Beautiful Daughter with influencing the direction of Led Zeppelin's first album.

The amoeba section of "A Very Cellular Song" was covered by actor Nigel Planer, in character as "Neil the Hippy" from the UK television show The Young Ones, on his 1984 LP Neil's Heavy Concept Album.

== Track listing ==
All tracks are written by Robin Williamson except where noted.

Side A
No.	Title	Length
1.	"Koeeoaddi There"	4:49
2.	"The Minotaur's Song"	3:22
3.	"Witches Hat"	2:33
4.	"A Very Cellular Song" (Mike Heron)	13:09

Side B
No.	Title	Length
5.	"Mercy I Cry City" (Heron)	2:46
6.	"Waltz of the New Moon"	5:10
7.	"The Water Song"	2:50
8.	"Three Is a Green Crown"	7:46
9.	"Swift As the Wind" (Heron)	4:53
10.	"Nightfall"	2:33

== Personnel ==
- Robin Williamson – lead vocals (on Williamson's compositions), guitar, gimbri, penny whistle, percussion, pan pipe, piano, oud, mandolin, jaw harp, chahanai, water harp, harmonica
- Mike Heron – lead vocals (on Heron's compositions), sitar, Hammond organ, guitar, hammered dulcimer, harpsichord
- Dolly Collins – flute organ, piano
- David Snell – harp
- Licorice McKechnie – vocals, finger cymbals
- Richard Thompson – vocals on "The Minotaur's Song" (uncredited)
- Judy Dyble – vocals on "The Minotaur's Song" (uncredited)

== Chart positions ==
Chart	Entry date	Peak position
UK Albums Chart	6 April 1968	5
US Billboard Top LP's	20 July 1968	161
