= October Song =

October Song might refer to

- "October Song", a song performed by The Incredible String Band from their eponymous first album
- "October Song", a song performed by Amy Winehouse from her debut album Frank
