= Nazir Jairazbhoy =

English-Indian professor of South Asian folk and classical music (1927-2009)

- Born: 31 October 1927
- Origin: England
- Died: 20 June 2009 (aged 81)
- Occupations: Professor of Folk and classical music

Nazir Ali Jairazbhoy (31 October 1927 – 20 June 2009) was a professor of folk and classical music of South Asia at the University of California at Los Angeles, where he was the founding chair of the Department of Ethnomusicology and Systematic Musicology. He was appointed professor of music at UCLA in 1975, and retired in 1994. He was president of the Society for Ethnomusicology.

== Life ==
Although born in England to Indian parents, he was educated in India. He began sitar studies as a child in Bombay from Madhav Lal. In 1967, credited as "Soma", he played sitar on The Incredible String Band's album The 5000 Spirits or the Layers of the Onion.

After graduation from the Doon School and the University of Washington. He was a student of Dr. Arnold Adriaan Bake at the School of Oriental and African Studies of the University of London, receiving his doctorate in 1971.

He produced more than 100 publications as well as audio and video productions on both classical and folk music of India. He founded the Archives and Research Centre for Ethnomusicology (ARCE) of the American Institute of Indian Studies in New Delhi.

He was married to the ethnomusicologist and singer Dr. Amy Catlin-Jairazbhoy and they both co-owned Apsara Media for Intercultural Education in Van Nuys, California.

== Major publications ==
- The Rags of North Indian Music: Their Structure and Evolution Popular Prakashan:Bombay 1995, ISBN 81-7154-395-2 (First published by Faber and Faber, 1971)
- Hi-Tech Shiva and Other Apocryphal Stories: An Academic Allegory. Apsara Media:Van Nuys California
- A Musical Journey through India, 1963-1964 (ten audio talks and book)
- Bake Restudy in India: 1938-1984 (jointly with Amy Catlin), a video which received an award from the Society for Visual Anthropology of the American Anthropological Association
- Retooling a Tradition: A Rajasthani Puppet Takes Umbrage at his Stringholders: A Fictive Documentary (jointly with Amy Catlin) Apsara Media: Van Nuys, California 1994
- Kathputli: The World of Rajasthani Puppeteers Rainbow Publishers: New Delhi – 20 Nov 2007
