= The Incredible String Band (album) =

- The original UK cover of the album, showing Clive Palmer, Robin Williamson, and Mike Heron

Studio album by the Incredible String Band
- Released: 30 June 1966 (UK); April 1967 (US)
- Recorded: 22 May 1966
- Studios: Sound Techniques, Chelsea, London
- Genre: Folk
- Length: 45:07
- Label: Elektra
- Producer: Joe Boyd

The Incredible String Band chronology
The Incredible String Band (1966)	The 5000 Spirits or the Layers of the Onion (1967)

The Incredible String Band is the debut album by The Incredible String Band, released in the United Kingdom in June 1966 by record label Elektra. It is the only one of the band's albums to feature the original trio line-up with Clive Palmer, Robin Williamson and Mike Heron.

== Recording ==
The trio had been signed to Elektra Records by Joe Boyd, who had seen them play in Glasgow. They recorded the album at the Sound Techniques studio in Chelsea, London in one afternoon in May 1966, with Boyd as producer. Boyd insisted on focusing on the group's own self-written material, rather than the traditional songs and tunes which they had also been performing, and with each performer singing his own material. This had the effect of marginalising Palmer, who had only one of his own songs featured on the record and only played on five songs in total. Less than half of the album featured collective performance. Nine of the album's sixteen songs were solo performances (five by Williamson, three by Heron and one by Palmer). Of the remaining seven songs, four were duets and only three featured all three musicians together.

The album showcased the trio's abilities on a variety of instruments, although the instrumentation is relatively orthodox compared to the band's later work. All three members played guitar and sang, with Palmer also playing banjo and kazoo and Williamson playing mandolin, banjo, tin whistle and fiddle/violin. The psychedelic imagery for which the band would become known is less prevalent on this album than on their later albums, although the liner notes, by Heron, include a surreal tale of the band's encounter with a magic blackbird. However, the album does contain unconventional tunes and singing styles.

== Release ==
The album was released in the United Kingdom in June 1966, and in the USA on Elektra in April 1967 (as attested in Billboard magazine's new album releases in the 9–15 April 1967 issue). The original LP sleeve used in the UK featured a photograph of the band holding up obscure musical instruments in a London music shop. For the US issue, a different photo was used, showing the three musicians posed on what appears to be a rusting bus.

The Incredible String Band did not chart when released, but in the UK following the Top 5 success of The Hangman's Beautiful Daughter it went to number 34 during a three-week run in the summer of 1968.

The trio broke up immediately after recording the album, but Heron and Williamson reunited after a few months to continue the band's name as a duo, later augmented by other musicians.

== Critical reception ==
Professional ratings
Review scores
Source	Rating
AllMusic	4/5 stars
Pitchfork	5.2/10

In a 1968 Sing Out! magazine interview Bob Dylan praised Williamson's "October Song" as one of his favorite songs of that period. Heron would later describe this album as his own favourite of the band's releases.

In their retrospective review, Lindsay Planer of AllMusic praised the album, calling it "their most simple [album]. It is this minimalism that allowed the natural radiance of the band's (mostly) original material to be evident in the purist sense, and likewise without many of the somewhat intricate distractions and musical tangents that their future work would incorporate".

== Track listing ==
Side A
No.	Title	Writer(s)	Length
1.	"Maybe Someday"	Mike Heron	2:20
2.	"October Song"	Robin Williamson	4:09
3.	"When the Music Starts to Play"	Heron	2:43
4.	"Schaeffer's Jig"	Traditional	0:58
5.	"Womankind"	Williamson	3:45
6.	"The Tree"	Heron	2:55
7.	"Whistle Tune"	Traditional, arr. Williamson	1:02
8.	"Dandelion Blues"	Williamson	3:02

Side B
No.	Title	Writer(s)	Length
1.	"How Happy I Am"	Heron	2:20
2.	"Empty Pocket Blues"	Clive Palmer	4:47
3.	"Smoke Shovelling Song"	Williamson	3:47
4.	"Can't Keep Me Here"	Heron	2:14
5.	"Good as Gone"	Williamson	3:30
6.	"Footsteps of the Heron"	Heron	3:14
7.	"Niggertown"	Traditional, arr. Palmer	2:09
8.	"Everything's Fine Right Now"	Heron	2:12

== Personnel ==
- Mike Heron – lead vocals on "Maybe Someday", "When The Music Starts to Play", "The Tree", "How Happy I Am", "Can"t Keep Me Here", "Footsteps of the Heron" & "Everything"s Fine Right Now"; guitar on "Maybe Someday", "When The Music Starts to Play", "The Tree", "Dandelion Blues", "How Happy I Am", "Empty Pocket Blues", "Can"t Keep Me Here", "Footsteps of the Heron" & "Everything"s Fine Right Now"; backing vocals on "Dandelion Blues" & "Empty Pocket Blues"
- Clive Palmer – lead vocals on "Empty Pocket Blues"; banjo on "Schaeffer"s Jig" & "Niggertown"; guitar on "How Happy I Am", "Empty Pocket Blues" & "Everything"s Fine Right Now"; kazoo on "Everything"s Fine Right Now'; backing vocals on "How Happy I Am"
- Robin Williamson – lead vocals on "October Song", "Womankind", "Dandelion Blues", "Smoke Shovelling Song" & "Good As Gone"; violin on "Maybe Someday"; guitar on "October Song", "Womankind", "Dandelion Blues", "Smoke Shovelling Song" & "Good As Gone"; tin whistle on "When The Music Starts to Play", "Whistle Tune" & "Empty Pocket Blues"; fiddle on "Schaeffer"s Jig"; mandolin on "How Happy I Am" & "Everything"s Fine Right Now"; backing vocals on "Maybe Someday", "When The Music Starts to Play", "How Happy I Am", "Empty Pocket Blues" & "Everything"s Fine Right Now"

== Charts ==
Chart	Entry date	Peak position
UK Albums Chart	20 July 1968	34
