= Habanera (John Harle album) =

Studio album by John Harle
- Released: 1987
- Recorded: April 24–25, 1987
- Studio: Firehouse Studios, London
- Genre: Classical, jazz, folk
- Length: 57:48
- Label: Hannibal; Rykodisc
- Producer: Joe Boyd

John Harle chronology
Habanera (1987)	John Harle's Saxophone (1988)

Professional ratings
Review scores
Source	Rating
Allmusic	3/5 stars

Habanera is an album by the English classical saxophonist John Harle and the pianist John Lenehan. Produced by Joe Boyd and released on his Hannibal world music record label in 1987, the recording features an eclectic range of composers and musical genres.

== Reception ==
Allmusic awarded the album with 3 stars.

== Track listing ==
No.	Title	Music	Length
1.	"Three Folksongs (from the country of Csík)"	Béla Bartók	3:34
2.	"Gymnopédie 1"	Erik Satie	6:48
3.	"Elergy for 'Trane"	Jeremy Wall	4:45
4.	"Three Preludes for Piano"	George Gershwin	6:40
5.	"Fantasia"	Heitor Villa-Lobos	4:05
6.	"Allegro"	Leonardo Vinci	1:50
7.	"Deep Purple"	Peter DeRose	5:09
8.	"Theme From 'Tender is the Night'"	Richard Rodney Bennett	3:59
9.	"Sonata in G Minor (BWV 1020)"	J. S. Bach	10:40
10.	"Homage to Edith Piaf"	Francis Poulenc	2:55
11.	"Syrinx"	Claude Debussy	2:29
12.	"Habanera"	Maurice Ravel	2:45
13.	"Out of the Cool"	Dave Heath	6:04

== Personnel ==
- John Harle – soprano and alto saxophones
- John Lenehan – piano
- Nick Parker – engineer
