= Clive Palmer (musician) =

British folk musician (1943–2014)

- Born: Clive Harold Palmer; 14 May 1943; Edmonton, North London, England
- Died: 23 November 2014 (aged 71) Penzance, Cornwall, England
- Genres: Folk music
- Instruments: Banjo, guitar
- Years active: 1957–2011
- Formerly of: The Incredible String Band

Clive Harold Palmer (14 May 1943 – 23 November 2014) was an English folk musician and banjoist, best known as a founding member of the Incredible String Band.

== Biography ==
Born in Edmonton, North London, Palmer first went on stage at the age of 8, and took banjo lessons from the age of 10. Around 1957 he began playing with jazz bands in Soho. He began busking with Wizz Jones in Paris in 1959–60, before moving to Edinburgh in late 1962. By now a virtuoso banjo player, he teamed up as a duo with singer and guitarist Robin Williamson in 1963, playing traditional and bluegrass songs. They became the Incredible String Band in 1965 when they decided to develop their sound and their own writing talents, and added a third member, Mike Heron. Early in 1966, he also ran "Clive's Incredible Folk Club" in Sauchiehall Street, Glasgow.

After recording the first ISB album, The Incredible String Band with Williamson, Heron and producer Joe Boyd, Palmer travelled to India, where he played on national television, and Afghanistan. On his return, he decided not to rejoin the increasingly successful duo. Instead, he recorded an album of banjo music, Banjoland, which remained unreleased until 2005.

He moved to Cornwall in 1968, where he worked as a woodwork teacher and became involved in trade union activities. He also formed the Famous Jug Band and played on their 1969 debut album Sunshine Possibilities, leaving before their 1970 album Chameleon. He later formed The Stockroom Five (1969) with Tim Wellard, John Bidwell and "Whispering" Mick Bennett and The Temple Creatures (1970), various line-ups including, at various times, Wellard, Bidwell, Bennett, percussionist Demelza Val Baker and singer Chrissie Quayle. He then formed another band, C.O.B. (Clive's Original Band), with John Bidwell and Mick Bennett, who released the album, Spirit of Love on CBS (1971), a single "Blue Morning/Bones" (1972) and the album Moyshe McStiff and the Tartan Lancers of the Sacred Heart both on Polydor (1972).

For the Polydor records, they were augmented on percussion and vocals by Genevieve Val Baker, Demelza's sister. C.O.B. played extensively in the UK during 1972, appearing at the Lincoln Festival and the Cambridge Folk Festival and often supporting Ralph McTell. They were the support (along with Wizz Jones) for the Autumn tour by Pentangle. C.O.B. split up in early 1973, Clive keeping the name for the remaining gigs they were booked to do and forming a new version of the band with Henry Bartlett from the Famous Jug Band and guitarist Chris Newman. A solo album called Just Me followed on the German label Autogram in 1978.

Palmer later moved to live in Brittany. He returned to recording music in the early 1990s, reuniting with Williamson, and then touring with Heron and (initially) Williamson in the reformed ISB towards the end of the decade. He issued a new album, All Roads Lead To Land in 2004.

In 2007, he moved back to Cornwall, teaming up with former "Stockroom 5" and "Temple Creatures" member Tim Wellard to produce a new album, The Land of No Return, released on the Spanish label Quadrant Records in 2008. A biography by Grahame Hood, "Empty Pocket Blues- the life and music of Clive Palmer", was published by Helter Skelter Publishing in May 2008. Made up of Cornish musicians, including Tim Wellard and John Bickersteth, he formed The Clive Palmer Band, who toured between 2008 and 2011 and produced another two albums, Along The Enchanted Way and Live at the Acorn in 2011.

Clive Palmer's death on 23 November 2014 in Penzance, after a long illness, was announced by fellow folk musician, Wizz Jones, who referred to him as "one of the finest musicians I have ever known... an inspiration and a well loved friend."

In 2022, a tribute album was assembled and put online under the title Spirit of Clive: A Tribute To The Music Of Clive Palmer & COB. It included tracks by such artists as Kurt Vile, Josephine Foster & Alasdair Roberts and proceeds were to be put towards the restoration of "recently discovered rare recordings of Clive from the 1960s onwards, and to the production of a documentary about Clive Palmer". As of January 2025, nothing further has been announced.

== Discography ==
- 1966: The Incredible String Band (The Incredible String Band)
- 1967: Banjoland (released in 2005)
- 1969: Sunshine Possibilities (Famous Jug Band)
- 1971: Spirit of Love (Clive's Original Band)
- 1972: Moyshe McStiff and the Tartan Lancers of the Sacred Heart (Clive's Original Band)
- 1978: Just Me – Autogram
- 1989: The Archive Tapes (Bob Devereux & Clive Palmer)
- 1993: Charlie Cool Goes West
- 1993: House of Images (cassette-only compilation)
- 1999: Suns & Moons (Clive Palmer & Bob Devereux) – Pig's Whisker
- 1999: At the Pure Fountain (with Robin Williamson)
- 2002: O For Summer (Famous Jug Band)
- 2004: All Roads Lead To Land a.k.a. Sands of Time – Unique Gravity (UK), Communion (US)
- 2008: The Land of No Return – Quadrant Records
- 2011: Along The Enchanted Way (The Clive Palmer Band)
- 2011: Live at the Acorn (The Clive Palmer Band)
