= The Incredible String Band =

Scottish psychedelic folk band

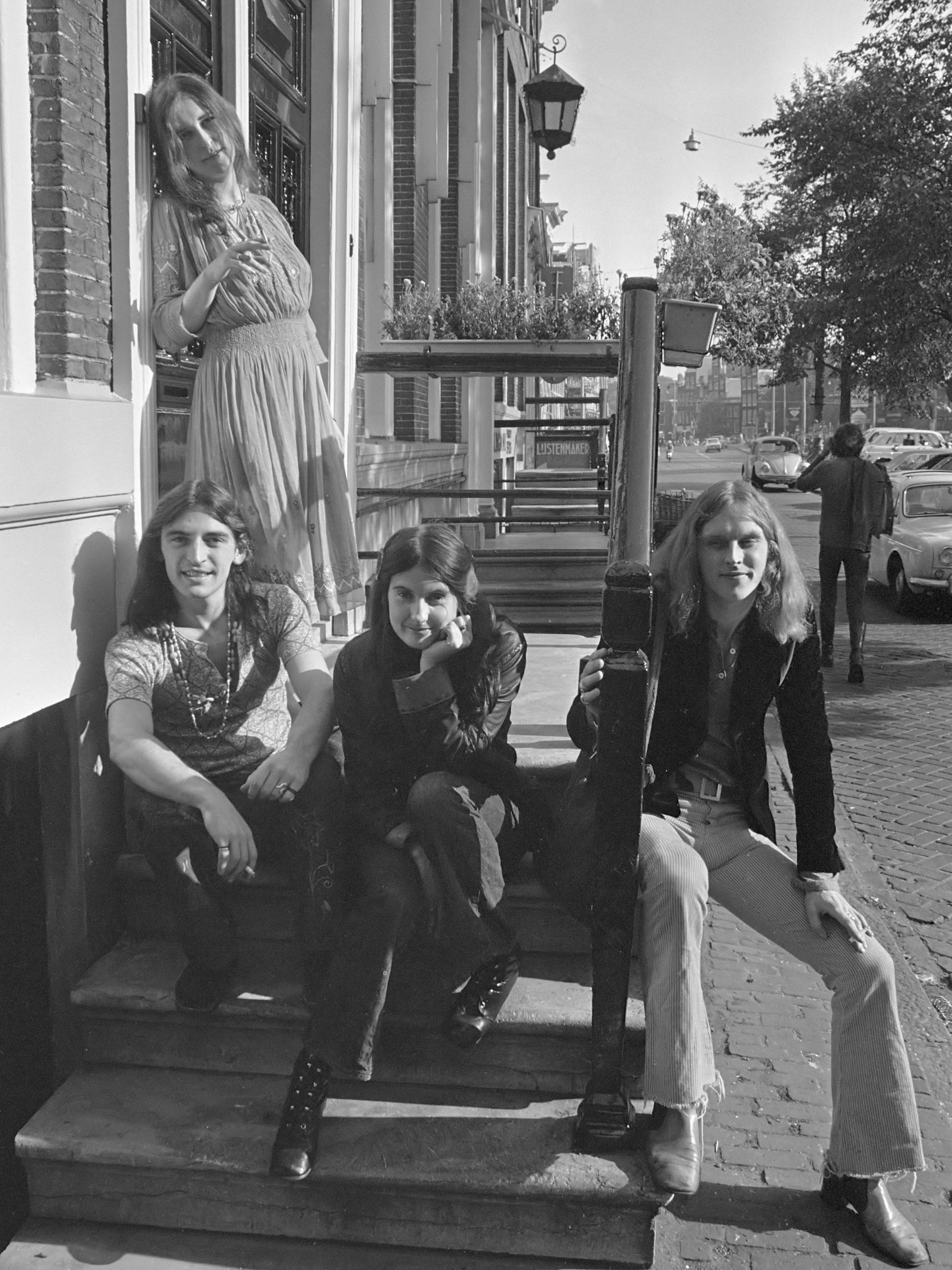
- The Incredible String Band (1970); Standing: Licorice McKechnie. Seated L–R: Mike Heron, Rose Simpson, Robin Williamson

Background information
- Origin: Edinburgh, Scotland
- Genres: Psychedelic folk; British folk rock; English folk
- Years active: 1966–1974, 1999–2006
- Labels: Elektra, Island
- Past members: Mike Heron; Robin Williamson; Clive Palmer; Licorice McKechnie; Rose Simpson; Malcolm Le Maistre; Stan Schnier; Jack Ingram; Gerard Dott; Graham Forbes; John Gilston; Lawson Dando; Bina Williamson; Claire Smith

The Incredible String Band (sometimes abbreviated as ISB) were a Scottish psychedelic folk band formed by Clive Palmer, Robin Williamson, and Mike Heron in Edinburgh in 1966. Following Palmer's early departure, Williamson and Heron continued as a duo and were eventually augmented by other musicians such as Licorice McKechnie, Rose Simpson, and Malcolm Le Maistre. The band split up in 1974. They reformed in 1999 and continued to perform with changing lineups until 2006.

The band built a considerable following in the British 1960s counterculture, notably with their albums The 5000 Spirits or the Layers of the Onion (1967), The Hangman's Beautiful Daughter (1968), and Wee Tam and the Big Huge (1968). They became pioneers in psychedelic folk and, through integrating a wide variety of traditional music forms and instruments, in the development of world music.

== History ==
=== Formation as a trio: 1965–66 ===
In 1963, acoustic musicians Robin Williamson and Clive Palmer began performing together as a traditional folk duo in Edinburgh, particularly at a weekly club run by Archie Fisher in the Crown Bar, which also regularly featured Bert Jansch. There they were seen in August 1965 by Joe Boyd, then working as a talent scout for the influential folk-based label Elektra Records. Later in the year, the duo decided to fill out their sound by adding a third member, initially to play rhythm guitar. After an audition, local rock musician Mike Heron won the slot. The trio took the name "the Incredible String Band". Early in 1966, Palmer began running an all-night folk club, Clive's Incredible Folk Club, on the fourth floor of a building in Sauchiehall Street in Glasgow, where they became the house band. When Boyd returned in his new role as head of Elektra's London office, he signed them up for an album, beating off a rival bid from Transatlantic Records.

They recorded their first album, entitled The Incredible String Band, at the Sound Techniques studio in London in May 1966. It was released in Britain and the United States and consisted mostly of self-penned material in solo, duo and trio formats, showcasing their playing on a variety of instruments. It won the title of "Folk Album of the Year" in Melody Maker's annual poll, and in a 1968 Sing Out! magazine interview Bob Dylan praised the album's "October Song" as one of his favourite songs of that period, stating it was "quite good".

The trio broke up after recording the album. Palmer left via the hippie trail for Afghanistan and India, and Williamson and his girlfriend Licorice McKechnie went to Morocco with no firm plans to return. Heron stayed in Edinburgh, playing with a band called Rock Bottom and the Deadbeats. However, when Williamson returned after running out of money, laden with Moroccan instruments (including a gimbri, which was much later eaten by rats), he and Heron reformed the band as a duo.

=== Development as a duo: 1966–67 ===
Cover of The 5000 Spirits or the Layers of the Onion, designed by The Fool

In November 1966 Heron and Williamson embarked on a short UK tour, supporting Tom Paxton and Judy Collins. In early 1967, they performed regularly at London clubs, including Les Cousins. Joe Boyd became the group's manager as well as producer and secured a place for them at the Newport Folk Festival, on a bill with Joni Mitchell and Leonard Cohen.

The duo were always credited as separate writers, maintaining their individual creative identities, rather than working as a writing partnership. Boyd wrote, "Mike and Robin were Clive's friends rather than each other's. Without him as a buffer, they developed a robust dislike for one another. Fortunately, the quality and quantity of their songwriting was roughly equal. Neither would agree to the inclusion of a new song by the other unless he could impose himself on it by arranging the instruments and working out all the harmonies."

In July, they released their second album, The 5000 Spirits or the Layers of the Onion, accompanied by Pentangle's Danny Thompson on double bass and Licorice McKechnie on vocals and percussion. The album demonstrated considerable musical development and a more unified ISB sound. It displayed their abilities as multi-instrumentalists and singer-songwriters, and gained them much wider acclaim. The album included Heron's "The Hedgehog's Song", Williamson's "First Girl I Loved" (later recorded by Judy Collins, Jackson Browne, Don Partridge and Wizz Jones) and his "Mad Hatter's Song", which, with its mixture of musical styles, paved the way for the band's more extended forays into psychedelia. Enthusiastic reviews in the music press were accompanied by appearances at venues such as London's UFO Club (co-owned by Boyd), the Speakeasy Club, and Queen Elizabeth Hall. Their exposure on John Peel's Perfumed Garden radio show on the pirate ship Radio London and later on BBC's Top Gear made them favourites with the emerging UK underground audience. The album went to number one in the UK folk chart, and was named by Paul McCartney as one of his favourite records of that year.

=== The Hangman's Beautiful Daughter and Wee Tam and the Big Huge: 1968 ===
1968 was the band's annus mirabilis with the release of their two most-celebrated albums, The Hangman's Beautiful Daughter and the double LP Wee Tam and the Big Huge (issued as two separate albums in the US). Hangman's reached the top 5 in the UK Albums Chart soon after its release in March 1968 and was nominated for a Grammy Award in the US. Robert Plant of Led Zeppelin said his group found their way by playing Hangman's and following the instructions. A departure from the band's previous albums, the set relied heavily on a more layered production, with imaginative use of the then new multitrack recording techniques. The album featured a series of vividly dreamlike Williamson songs, such as "The Minotaur's Song", a surreal music-hall parody told from the point of view of the mythical beast, and its centrepiece was Heron's "A Very Cellular Song", a 13-minute reflection on life, love and amoebas, its complex structure incorporating a Bahamian spiritual ("I Bid You Goodnight"). The album again featured contributions from Licorice McKechnie on vocals and finger cymbals, Dolly Collins on flute organ and piano and David Snell (musician) on harp.

By early 1968, the group were capable of filling major venues in the UK. They left behind their folk club origins and embarked on a nationwide tour, incorporating a critically acclaimed appearance at the London Royal Festival Hall. Later in the year, they performed at the Royal Albert Hall, at open-air festivals, and at prestigious rock venues, such as the Fillmore auditoriums in San Francisco and New York. After their appearance at the Fillmore East in New York, they were introduced to the practice of Scientology by David Simons (aka "Rex Rakish" and "Bruno Wolfe", once of Jim Kweskin's Jug Band). Joe Boyd, in his book White Bicycles: Making Music in the 1960s and elsewhere, described how he was inadvertently responsible for their "conversion" when he introduced the band to Simons, who, having become a Scientologist, persuaded them to enrol in his absence. The band's support for Scientology over the next few years was controversial among some fans and seemed to coincide with what many saw as the beginning of a decline in the quality of their work. In an interview with Oz magazine in 1969, the band spoke enthusiastically of their involvement with it, although the question of its effect on their later albums has provoked much discussion ever since.

Their November 1968 album Wee Tam and the Big Huge, recorded before the US trip, was musically less experimental and lush than Hangman's but conceptually even more avant-garde, a full-on engagement with the themes of mythology, religion, awareness and identity. Williamson's otherworldly songs and vision dominate the album, though Heron's more grounded tracks are also among his best, and the contrast between the two perspectives gives the record its uniquely dynamic interplay between a sensual experience of life and a quest for metaphysical meaning. The record was released as a double album and also simultaneously as two separate LPs, a strategy which lessened its impact on the charts. It was on this album that Mike Heron's then-girlfriend, Rose Simpson, began contributing musically to the band in the studio, with both she and Licorice McKechnie providing backing vocals, organ, guitar and percussion among other instruments. Despite her initially rudimentary skills, Simpson swiftly became a proficient bass guitarist, and some of McKechnie's songs were recorded by the band.

=== Woodstock and multimedia: 1969–70 ===
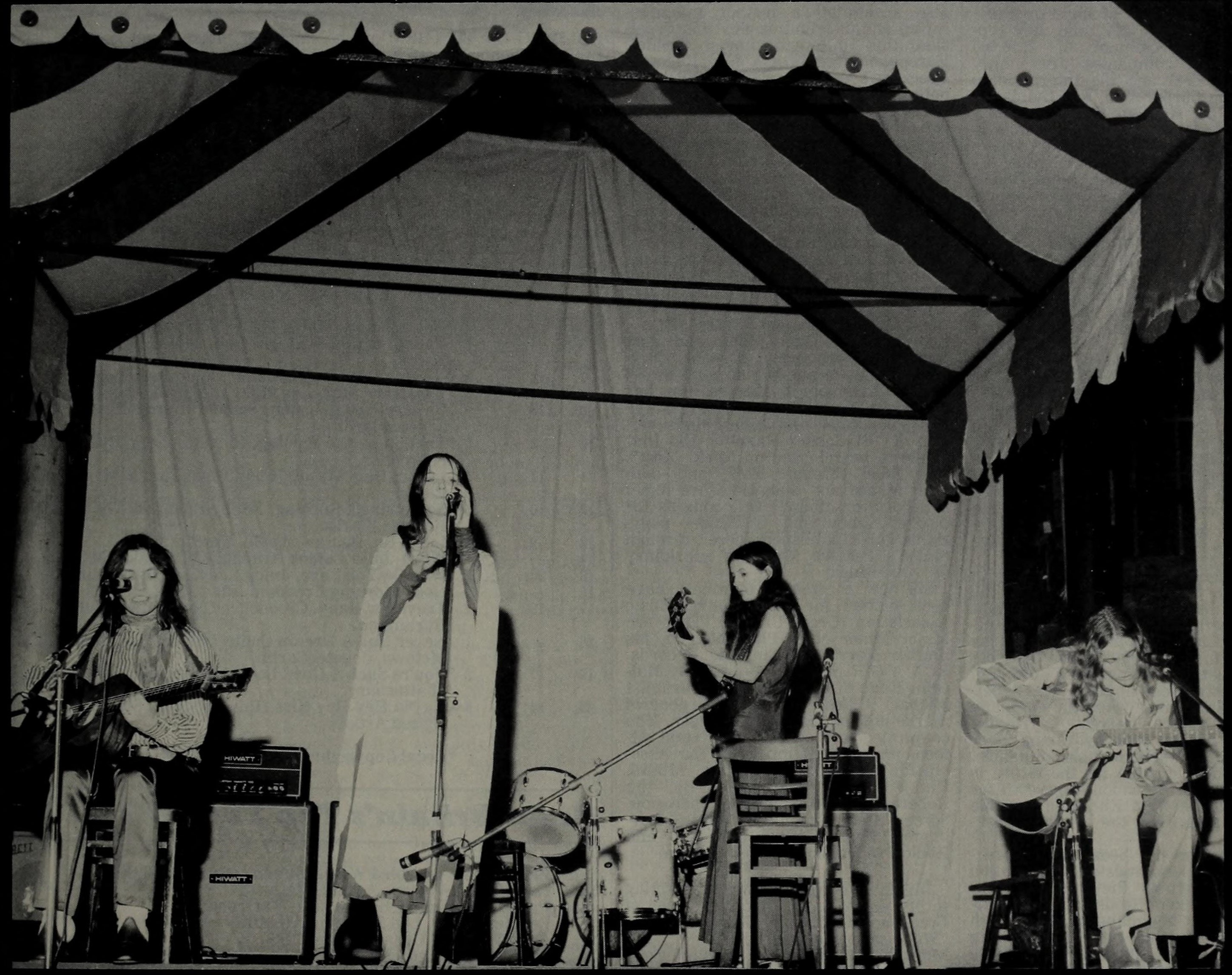
The Incredible String Band on the cover of Cash Box; May 2, 1970

At this time, most of the group lived communally at a farmhouse near Newport, in Pembrokeshire, Wales, where they developed ideas for mixed media experiments with Malcolm Le Maistre and other members of David Medalla's Exploding Galaxy troupe and the Leonard Halliwell Quartet. There, a film was made about the ISB, Be Glad For the Song Has No Ending. Originally planned for BBC TV's arts programme Omnibus, it featured documentary footage and a fantasy sequence, 'The Pirate and the Crystal Ball', illustrating their attempt at an idyllic communal lifestyle. It made little impact at the time, but reissues on video and DVD have contributed to the recent revival of interest in the band.

The band toured for much of 1969, in the US and the UK. In July they played at the Albert Hall on the fourth night of the "Pop Proms". They were introduced by John Peel and talked about their first brush with Scientology. Other acts in the week were Led Zeppelin and The Who. On 28 May 1969 the band received a phone call from Michael Lang, the producer of the Woodstock Festival, asking the band to perform at the festival for a payment of $4,500. In August, they were slotted to play on Friday when all the folk-oriented and acoustic acts were expected to perform. However, the band refused to perform in the pouring rain, so stage manager John Morris rescheduled their performance for the following day. Their open slot was taken by Melanie, whose showing inspired her song, "Lay Down (Candles in the Rain)". The following day, 16 August 1969, at approximately 6:30 p.m., the band played in between the Keef Hartley Band and Canned Heat. The crowd was not anticipating the band's performance on a day that featured mainly hard rock acts. For that reason, the group was generally disfavoured and, perhaps more importantly, were not included in the filming of the festival. Over the Labor Day weekend in 1969, they appeared at the Texas International Pop Festival, in Lewisville, Texas. In November, they released the album Changing Horses, which was generally seen as a disappointment after their earlier work. By late 1969, they had established a communal base at Glen Row near Innerleithen. In April 1970 they released the album I Looked Up.

The ISB's performances were more theatrical than those of most of their contemporaries. In addition to the spectacle of their exotic instruments and colourful stage costumes, their concerts sometimes featured poems, surreal sketches and dancers, all in the homegrown, non-showbiz style characteristic of the hippie era. In 1970, Robin Williamson, with little input from Heron, attempted to fuse the music with his theatrical fantasies in a quixotic multimedia spectacular at London's Roundhouse called "U", which he envisaged as "a surreal parable in dance and song". It combined the band's music with dancing by the Stone Monkey troupe, which had evolved out of Exploding Galaxy, the letter U representing a transition from a high level of spiritual awareness to a low, then returning to a final peak of awareness and communication. Although the performance was ambitious, critical response was mixed, with some harsh reviews from critics who had in some cases acclaimed their earlier work. It fared little better in New York, and a planned US tour of "U" had to be cancelled after a few performances at the Fillmore East. Joe Boyd described the show as "a disaster".

=== Diminishing returns: 1971–74 ===
After that, the group lasted another four years, although there was a gradual decline in their status and commercial success after 1970. Joe Boyd, whose skillful handling of the band had contributed much to their international success, stopped managing them and returned to the US. The group left Elektra Records and signed with Island, for whom they recorded five albums. The first was a soundtrack to the "Be Glad..." film, and this was followed by the eclectic Liquid Acrobat as Regards the Air, regarded as their best album for some time.

The band continued to tour and record. Rose Simpson left in 1971 and was replaced by Malcolm Le Maistre, formerly of the Stone Monkey troupe. Mike Heron took time out to record a well-received solo album, Smiling Men with Bad Reputations, which, in contrast to the ISB's self-contained productions, featured a host of session guests, among them Pete Townshend, Ronnie Lane, Keith Moon, John Cale and Richard Thompson. The following year, Licorice McKechnie left, and was replaced by Gerard Dott, an Edinburgh jazz musician and friend of both Heron and Williamson who had contributed to Smiling Men. Williamson also recorded a solo album, Myrrh, which featured some of his most extraordinary vocal performances.

The group's changing lineup, adding Stan Schnier (aka "Stan Lee") on bass, Jack Ingram on drums, and Graham Forbes on electric guitar, reflected moves toward a more conventional amplified rock group. Their final albums for Island were received disappointingly, and the label dropped them in 1974. By then, disagreements between Williamson and Heron about musical policy had become irreconcilable, and they split up in October 1974.

=== Solo careers: 1974–2014 ===
Williamson soon formed Robin Williamson and His Merry Band, which toured and released three albums of eclectic music with a Celtic emphasis. Within a few years, he went on to a solo career, moving between traditional Celtic styles and more avant-garde material. He also produced several recordings of humorous stories. In all, Williamson released over forty albums post-ISB. Notable in this output are the Grammy-nominated Wheel of Fortune (1995, with John Renbourn) and four records on the jazz/classical/avant-garde ECM label: The Seed-at-Zero (2000), Skirting the River Road (2002), The Iron Stone (2006), and Trusting in the Rising Light (2014). Heron formed a rock group with Malcolm Le Maistre, called first Mike Heron's Reputation, then just Heron, and later released occasional solo albums. Malcolm Le Maistre continued teaching in schools and performing theatre and music, and he released two albums.

=== Reunion and final separation: 1999–2006 ===
In 1997, Williamson and Heron got back together for two concerts, which were warmly received. This was followed by a full reunion of the original three members plus Williamson's wife, Bina, and Lawson Dando in 1999. However, they did not recapture the high reputation of the original ISB, playing mostly small venues to mixed critical and audience responses. In March 2003, it was announced that Robin and Bina Williamson had "temporarily" left to pursue other projects and their solo careers. Rumours circulated of an acrimonious split. A long-standing agreement between Williamson and Heron that neither would use the name 'Incredible String Band' without the other's involvement was bypassed by a temporary re-branding as 'incrediblestringband2003'. Heron, Palmer and Dando, and new member Clare "Fluff" Smith, continued to tour regularly around the United Kingdom and internationally. Heron, Dando and Palmer toured the US in 2004. Another live album was released in 2005. Their last concert together was at the Moseley Folk Festival, Birmingham, UK, in September 2006.

=== Barbican: 2009 ===
In 2009, Heron and Palmer announced a concert entitled "Very Cellular Songs: The Music of the Incredible String Band" at The Barbican, featuring Richard Thompson, Danny Thompson, Robyn Hitchcock, Alasdair Roberts, Trembling Bells, Green Gartside, and Dr Strangely Strange.

== Musical style ==
Stylistically the ISB were centred around the idioms of conventional folk and pop, but their notable experimentation with musical form, instrumentation and styles (e.g. Indian and Moroccan) led them to innovative, often eclectic, compositions. In 1967–68 they were described as part of pop music's "underground". Williamson claimed that, as both the Beatles and the Rolling Stones saw them play before Sgt. Pepper's Lonely Hearts Club Band and Their Satanic Majesties Request were recorded, the ISB were an influence on those albums. Chris Cutler commented that "They were one of the most important bands of that era ... Instead of AABABA etc., their developments would go linearly, A-B-C-D-E-F-G-H-I-J-K-L-M and beyond; no one else thought that way ever ..." [emphasis in original] One of Bob Dylan's favourite songs was "October Song", from ISB's debut album. Robert Plant claimed that Led Zeppelin found their way by playing "The Hangman's Beautiful Daughter" (see above). Following in the footsteps of ISB, Led Zeppelin later successfully incorporated Moroccan rhythms (e.g. on "Dancing Days").

Both Mike Heron and Robin Williamson would insert seemingly unrelated sections in their songs in a way that has been described as "always surprising, laughably inventive, lyrically prodigious".

== Legacy ==
In 1994, former member Rose Simpson became Mayoress of Aberystwyth. In 2003, the Archbishop of Canterbury, Rowan Williams, who had previously chosen "The Hedgehog's Song" when he appeared on Desert Island Discs, wrote a foreword for a full-length book about the band, describing them as "holy". Licorice McKechnie was last seen in 1987, and may be deceased.

== Personnel ==
=== Members ===
- Mike Heron (1965–1974, 1999–2006)
- Robin Williamson (1965–1974, 1999–2003)
- Clive Palmer (1965–1966, 1999–2006; died 2014)
- Christina "Licorice" McKechnie (1968–1972)
- Rose Simpson (1968–1971)
- Malcolm Le Maistre (1971–1974)
- Stan Schnier (1972–1974)
- Jack Ingram (1972–1974)
- Gerard Dott (1972–1973)
- Graham Forbes (1973–1974)
- John Gilston (1974)
- Lawson Dando (1999–2006)
- Bina Williamson (1999–2003)
- Claire "Fluff" Smith (2003–2006)

=== Lineups ===
1965–1966	1966–1968	1968–1971	1971–1972
Mike Heron; Clive Palmer; Robin Williamson	Mike Heron; Robin Williamson	Mike Heron; Robin Williamson; Licorice McKechnie; Rose Simpson	Mike Heron; Robin Williamson; Licorice McKechnie; Malcolm Le Maistre
1972–1973	1973–1974	1974	1974–1999
Mike Heron; Robin Williamson; Malcolm Le Maistre; Gerard Dott; Jack Ingram; Stan Schnier	Mike Heron; Robin Williamson; Malcolm Le Maistre; Jack Ingram; Stan Schnier; Graham Forbes	Mike Heron; Robin Williamson; Malcolm Le Maistre; Stan Schnier; Graham Forbes; John Gilston	Disbanded
1999–2003	2003–2006
Mike Heron; Robin Williamson; Clive Palmer; Lawson Dando; Bina Williamson	Mike Heron; Clive Palmer; Lawson Dando; Claire Smith

== Discography ==
=== Albums ===
==== Studio albums ====
Release date	Album	Chart positions		Label
Release date	Album	UK Albums Chart	Billboard 200	Label
June 1966	The Incredible String Band	34 (in 1968)	-	Elektra
July 1967	The 5000 Spirits or the Layers of the Onion	25	–	Elektra
March 1968	The Hangman's Beautiful Daughter	5	161	Elektra
November 1968	Wee Tam and the Big Huge	–	174 (Wee Tam); 180 (The Big Huge)	Elektra
November 1969	Changing Horses	30	166	Elektra
April 1970	I Looked Up	30	196	Elektra
October 1970	U	34	183	Elektra
March 1971	Be Glad for the Song Has No Ending	–	–	Island
October 1971	Liquid Acrobat as Regards the Air	46	189	Island
October 1972	Earthspan	–	–	Island
February 1973	No Ruinous Feud	–	–	Island
March 1974	Hard Rope & Silken Twine, illustrated by Wayne Anderson	–	–	Island

==== Live albums ====
- BBC Radio 1 Live on Air (October 1991)
- BBC Radio 1 Live in Concert (November 1992)
- First Girl I Loved: Live in Canada 1972 (Trojan Records, 2001)
- Nebulous Nearnesses (2004)
- Across The Airwaves: BBC Radio Recordings 1969-74 (2007)
- Tricks of the Senses – Rare and Unreleased Recordings 1966 – 1972 (Hux Records 2008)
- Everything's Fine (Secret Records 2013)
- Live at the Fillmore 1968 (HUX 137, 2013 HUX Records)

==== Compilations ====
- The Chelsea Sessions 1967 Unreleased Demos (Pigs Whisker Music, October 2005)
- Relics of The Incredible String Band (Elektra compilation, March 1971)
- Seasons They Change (Island compilation, November 1976)

For solo releases, see under Robin Williamson, Mike Heron, Clive Palmer and Malcolm Le Maistre.

=== Singles (UK only) ===
- "Way Back in the 1960s" / "Chinese White" (Elektra EKSN 45013, promotional release only, 1967)
- "Painting Box" / "No Sleep Blues" (Elektra EKSN 45028, March 1968)
- "Big Ted" / "All Writ Down" (Elektra EKSN 45074, October 1969)
- "This Moment" / "Black Jack Davy" (Elektra 2101 003, April 1970)
- "Black Jack David" / "Moon Hang Low" (Island WIP 6145, November 1972)
- "At the Lighthouse Dance" / "Jigs" (Island WIP 6158, February 1973)
