= White Bicycles =

Book by Joe Boyd

White Bicycles: Making Music in the 1960s
- White Bicycles cover.
- Author: Joe Boyd
- Cover artist: Wall Creative, Nigel Waymouth
- Language: English
- Subject: 1960s, music, record production
- Genre: Music, autobiography
- Publisher: Serpent's Tail, London
- Publication date: 2006
- Publication place: England
- Media type: Print (Hardcover, Paperback)
- Pages: ca. 280 pp
- ISBN: 1-85242-910-0
- OCLC: 77272335
- Dewey Decimal: 782.42164092 22
- LC Class: ML429.B69 A3 2006

White Bicycles: Making Music in the 1960s is the memoir of music producer Joe Boyd. It is published by Serpent's Tail. A companion CD of music he had produced in the 1960s and associated with the book was published by Fledg'ling Records at the same time. The title refers to the 1967 song "My White Bicycle" by Tomorrow, which was about Amsterdam's community bicycle program.

The author, record and film producer Joe Boyd has produced music for artists including Pink Floyd, Nick Drake, Fairport Convention and R.E.M. He produced the documentary Jimi Hendrix and the film Scandal. In 1980 he founded Hannibal Records. He lives in London where he writes for The Guardian and The Independent newspapers.
