= Everything's Fine =

Everything's Fine may refer to:

- Everything's Fine (The Summer Set album), 2011
- Everything's Fine (Jean Grae and Quelle Chris album), 2018
- Everything's Fine (Matt Corby album), 2023
- "Everything's Fine?", 2020 song by Indian singer Sanjeeta Bhattacharya
- Sarah Cooper: Everything's Fine, a 2020 comedy special streaming video
- Everything's Fine, a 2022 one-man show by Douglas McGrath
- "Everything's Fine" (AM & PM), a 2026 single by Alok and Jennifer Lopez
