= Joe Boyd =

American record producer and writer (born 1942)

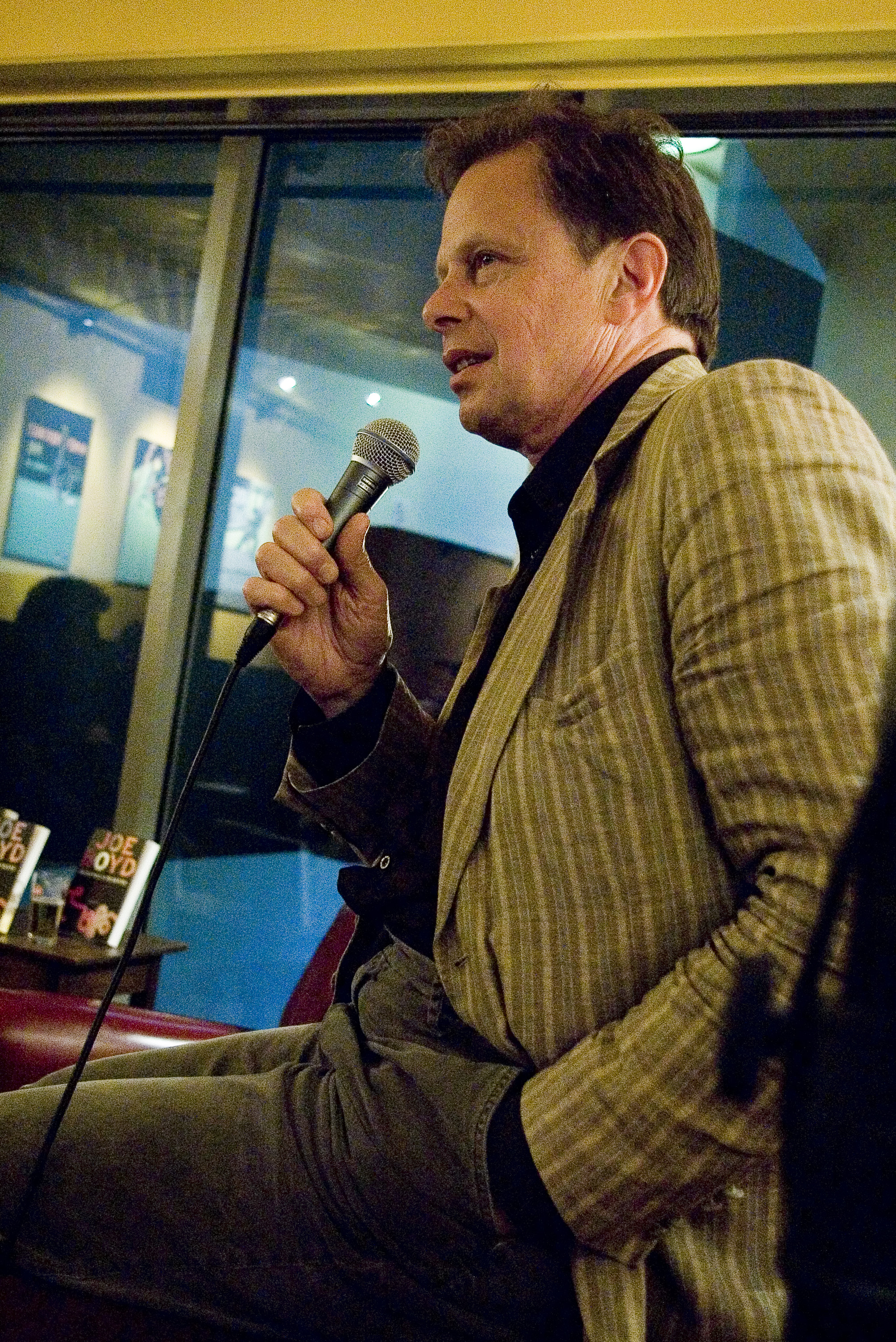
- Boyd at the Ancienne Belgique Cafe in Brussels promoting his memoir, White Bicycles, 2008

Background information
- Born: August 5, 1942 (age 84); Boston, Massachusetts, U.S.
- Origin: United States
- Occupation: Record producer
- Years active: 1960s–present
- Label: Hannibal
- Website: joeboyd.co.uk

Joe Boyd (born August 5, 1942) is an American record producer and writer. He formerly owned Hannibal Records. Boyd has worked with Pink Floyd, Fairport Convention, Sandy Denny, Richard Thompson, Nick Drake, The Incredible String Band, R.E.M., Vashti Bunyan, John and Beverley Martyn, Maria Muldaur, Kate & Anna McGarrigle, Billy Bragg, James Booker, 10,000 Maniacs, and Muzsikás. He was also one of the founders of the highly influential nightclub venue UFO.

== Background ==
Boyd was born in Boston and grew up in Princeton, New Jersey. He attended Pomfret School in Pomfret, Connecticut. He first became involved in music promoting blues artists while a student at Harvard University. After graduating, he worked as a production and tour manager for music impresario George Wein, which took Boyd to Europe to organize concerts with Muddy Waters, Coleman Hawkins, Stan Getz and Sister Rosetta Tharpe. Boyd was responsible for running the sound at the 1965 Newport Folk Festival, when Bob Dylan played a controversial set backed by electric musicians.

In 1964 Boyd moved to London to establish the U.K. office of Elektra Records. In 1966, Boyd and John "Hoppy" Hopkins opened the UFO Club, a famous but short-lived UK Underground club in London's Tottenham Court Road. He produced the first single "Arnold Layne" by UFO regulars Pink Floyd, and recordings by Soft Machine. Boyd worked extensively with audio engineer John Wood at Sound Techniques studio in Chelsea. In this studio, Boyd and Wood made a succession of celebrated albums with British folk and folk rock artists, including the Incredible String Band, Martin Carthy, Nick Drake, John Martyn, Fairport Convention and Richard Thompson. Some of these artists were produced by Boyd's company Witchseason Productions and had their songs published by Boyd's Warlock Music.

Boyd returned to the United States at the end of 1970 to work as a music producer for Warner Bros. with special input into films, where he collaborated with Stanley Kubrick on the soundtrack of A Clockwork Orange. Boyd also contributed to the soundtrack of Deliverance, directed by John Boorman, where he supervised the recording of "Dueling Banjos", which became a hit single for Eric Weissberg. Boyd produced and co-directed the film documentary Jimi Hendrix (1973). In the U.S., Boyd produced albums by Maria Muldaur and Kate & Anna McGarrigle and then founded the Hannibal Records label in 1980 (later absorbed into Rykodisc), which released albums by Richard Thompson and many recordings of world music, including Hungarian band Muzsikás. Boyd also produced R.E.M.'s third album Fables of the Reconstruction (1985) as well as records by Billy Bragg and 10,000 Maniacs.

Boyd was executive producer for the 1989 feature film Scandal, starring John Hurt and Bridget Fonda about the Profumo affair in U.K. politics in 1963. Boyd left Hannibal/Ryko in 2001 and his autobiography, White Bicycles – Making Music in the 1960s, was published in 2006 by Serpent's Tail in the U.K. In 2008, he was a judge for the 7th annual Independent Music Awards to support independent artists. He was a producer on the long-delayed Aretha Franklin concert film "Amazing Grace."

== Records produced or co-produced ==
| Date | Artist | Album | Label | Notes |
|---|---|---|---|---|
| 1966 | The Incredible String Band | The Incredible String Band | | |
| 1966 | Sydney Carter | Lord of the Dance | | |
| 1966 | Alasdair Clayre | Alasdair Clayre | | |
| 1966 | Various artists, three tracks by Eric Clapton and the Powerhouse | What's Shakin' | | |
| 1966 | various artists: Cyril Tawney, Matt McGinn, Johnny Handle and Alasdair Clayre | A Cold Wind Blows | Elektra | |
| 1967 | Shirley Collins | The Power of the True Love Knot | | |
| 1967 | The Incredible String Band | The 5000 Spirits or the Layers of the Onion | | |
| 1967 | Dave Swarbrick, Martin Carthy, and Diz Disley | Rags Reels and Airs | | |
| 1967 | Pink Floyd | "Arnold Layne" / "Candy and a Currant Bun" | | |
| 1967 | The Purple Gang | "Granny Takes a Trip" | | see 'Further reading' section |
| 1967 | Soft Machine | "She's Gone", "I Should've Known" | | recordings for projected single (Sound Techniques, London), released 1977 on Triple Echo, CD rel.: Turns On Volume 1, Voiceprint 2001 |
| 1968 | Pink Floyd tracks of compilation | Tonite Lets All Make Love in London | | |
| 1968 | Chris McGregor | Very Urgent | | |
| 1968 | Fairport Convention | "If I Had a Ribbon Bow" / "If (Stomp)" | | |
| 1968 | Fairport Convention | "If (Stomp)" / "Chelsea Morning" | | |
| 1968 | Fairport Convention | Fairport Convention | | |
| 1968 | The Incredible String Band | The Hangman's Beautiful Daughter | | |
| 1968 | The Incredible String Band | Wee Tam and the Big Huge | | |
| 1968 | various Indian artists | Kalpana | | compilation of instrumental and dance music from India |
| 1969 | Fairport Convention | What We Did on Our Holidays | | |
| 1969 | Fairport Convention | "Si Tu Dois Partir" / "Genesis Hall" | | |
| 1969 | Fairport Convention | Unhalfbricking | | |
| 1969 | Nick Drake | Five Leaves Left | | |
| 1969 | Fairport Convention | Liege & Lief | | |
| 1969 | Dr. Strangely Strange | Kip of the Serenes | | |
| 1969 | The Incredible String Band | "Big Ted" / "All Writ Down" | | |
| 1969 | The Incredible String Band | Changing Horses | | |
| 1970 | Nico | Desertshore | | |
| 1970 | Vashti Bunyan | Just Another Diamond Day | | |
| 1970 | John and Beverley Martyn | Stormbringer! | | |
| 1970 | The Incredible String Band | U | | |
| 1970 | Fairport Convention | Full House | | |
| 1970 | Fotheringay | Fotheringay | | |
| 1970 | The Incredible String Band | I Looked Up | | |
| 1970 | The Incredible String Band | Be Glad for the Song Has No Ending | | |
| 1970 | Geoff and Maria Muldaur | Pottery Pie | | |
| 1970 | Brotherhood of Breath | Brotherhood of Breath | | |
| 1971 | Nick Drake | Bryter Layter | | |
| 1971 | Mike Heron | Smiling Men with Bad Reputations | | |
| 1971 | Mike Heron | "Call Me Diamond" / "Lady Wonder" | | |
| 1971 | John and Beverley Martyn | The Road to Ruin | | |
| 1971 | Dr. Strangely Strange | Heavy Petting | | |
| 1973 | Maria Muldaur | Maria Muldaur | | |
| 1973 | Maria Muldaur | "Midnight at the Oasis" b/w "Any Old Time" | | |
| 1973 | Eric Weissberg and Steve Mandel | "Dueling Banjos" b/w "Reuben's Train" | | |
| 1973 | Jimi Hendrix | Jimi Hendrix | | soundtrack |
| 1974 | Maria Muldaur | Waitress in a Donut Shop | | |
| 1974 | Muleskinner | Muleskinner | | |
| 1975 | Kate and Anna McGarrigle | Kate & Anna McGarrigle | | |
| 1975 | Geoff Muldaur | Geoff Muldaur Is Having a Wonderful Time | | |
| 1976 | James Booker | Junco Partner | | |
| 1976 | Fairport Convention | Live at the L.A. Troubadour | | |
| 1976 | Maria Muldaur | Sweet Harmony | | |
| 1976 | Toots & the Maytals | Reggae Got Soul | | |
| 1977 | Kate & Anna McGarrigle | Dancer with Bruised Knees | | |
| 1978 | The Albion Band | Rise Up Like the Sun | | |
| 1978 | Julie Covington | Julie Covington | | |
| 1981 | The Act (a band fronted by Nick Laird-Clowes) | Too Late at Twenty | | |
| 1981 | Joe "King" Carrasco and The Crowns | Party Safari | | |
| 1981 | Geoff Muldaur | I Ain't Drunk | | |
| 1982 | Richard and Linda Thompson | Shoot Out the Lights | | |
| 1982 | Richard and Linda Thompson | "Don't Renege on Our Love" / "Living in Luxury" | | |
| 1982 | Defunkt | Thermonuclear Sweat | | |
| 1982 | Cool It Reba | Money Fall Out the Sky | | |
| 1983 | Richard Thompson | Hand of Kindness | | |
| 1983 | original cast recording | Poppie Nongena | | |
| 1984 | Richard Thompson | Small Town Romance | | |
| 1985 | Richard Thompson | Across a Crowded Room | | |
| 1985 | R.E.M. | Fables of the Reconstruction | | |
| 1985 | 10,000 Maniacs | The Wishing Chair | | |
| 1986 | Fairport Convention | House Full – Live at the LA Troubador | | |
| 1986 | Dagmar Krause | Supply and Demand, German version: Angebot und Nachfrage | | |
| 1987 | Balkana | The Music of Bulgaria | | |
| 1987 | John Harle | Habanera | | |
| 1987 | Danny Thompson | Whatever | | |
| 1988 | Nazakat & Salamat Ali | Nazakat & Salamat Ali | | |
| 1988 | Billy Bragg | Worker's Playtime | | |
| 1988 | The Trio Bulgarka | The Forest Is Crying | | |
| 1988 | Toumani Diabaté | Kaira | | |
| 1988 | Ketama, Toumani Diabaté and Danny Thompson | Songhai | | |
| 1988 | The Dinner Ladies | These Knees Have Seen the World | | |
| 1988 | Brotherhood of Breath | Country Cooking | | |
| 1988 | Mary Margaret O'Hara | Miss America | | Boyd uncredited |
| 1989 | Ivo Papasov and His Bulgarian Wedding Band | Orpheus Ascending | | |
| 1989 | June Tabor | Some Other Time | | |
| 1990 | The Blackgirls | Procedure | | |
| 1991 | The Blackgirls | Happy | | |
| 1991 | Ivo Papasov and His Bulgarian Wedding Band | Balkanology | | |
| 1991 | The Watchman | The Watchman | | |
| 1992 | Orbestra | Trans-Danubian Swineherd's Music | | |
| 1994 | Ketama, Toumani Diabaté and Danny Thompson | Songhai 2 | | |
| 1996 | ¡Cubanismo! | ¡Cubanismo! | | |
| 1996 | Toumani Diabaté | Djelika | | |
| 1997 | Alfredo Rodriguez | Cuba Linda | | |
| 1997 | ¡Cubanismo! | Malembe | | |
| 1998 | ¡Cubanismo! | Reencarnation | | |
| 1998 | The Hank Dogs | Bareback | | |
| 1998 | Jazz Jamaica | Double Barrel | | |
| 1998 | Dana and Karen Kletter | Dear Enemy | | |
| 1998 | Kate & Anna McGarrigle | The McGarrigle Hour | | |
| 1998 | Philip Pickett | The Bones of All Men | | |
| 1998 | The Yockamo All-Stars | Dew Drop Out | | |
| 1999 | ¡Cubanismo! | Mardi Gras Mambo | | |
| 1999 | Taj Mahal and Toumani Diabaté | Kulanjan | | |
| 1999 | Loudon Wainwright III | Social Studies | | |
| 2002 | The Hank Dogs | Half Smile | | |
| 2004 | Geoff Muldaur's Futuristic Ensemble | Private Astronomy | | |
| 2004 | Virginia Rodrigues | Mares Profundos | | |
| 2005 | Pink Floyd | London '66-'67 | | |
| 2007 | Athena | Breathe with Me | | |
| 2014 | Robyn Hitchcock | The Man Upstairs | | |
| 2017 | Maya Youssef | Syrian Dreams | | Executive Producer |
| 2020 | Damir Imamović | Singer of Tales | Wrasse Records | co-production Andrea Goertler |

== Books ==
His memoir, White Bicycles: Making Music in the 1960s, was published in 2007, and his second book, And the Roots of Rhythm Remain: A Journey Through Global Music, in 2024.
