= Rose Simpson =

English former musician (born 1946)

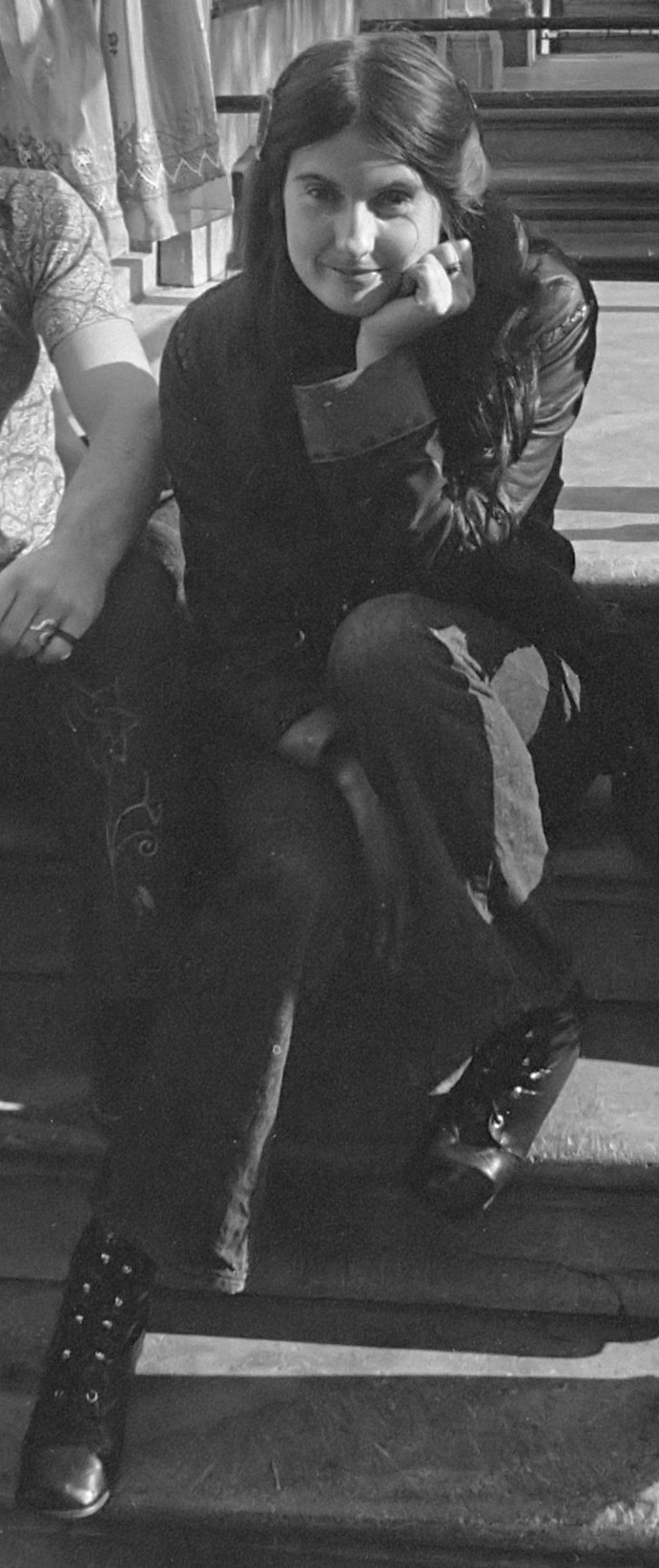
- Rose Simpson in 1970

Background information
- Born: Rosemary Simpson; 22 November 1946 (age 79); Otley, Yorkshire, England
- Occupations: Singer, musician
- Instruments: Bass guitar, vocals, violin, percussion
- Years active: 1968–1971
- Formerly of: The Incredible String Band

Rose Simpson (born 22 November 1945) is an English former musician. Between 1968 and 1971, she was a member of the Incredible String Band, with whom she sang and played bass guitar, violin and percussion among other instruments. She later became Lady Mayoress of the Welsh town of Aberystwyth.

== Biography ==
Simpson was born in Otley, Yorkshire. By the mid-1960s, she was studying at the University of York, where she was president of the mountaineering club. She met Robin Williamson and Mike Heron in 1968 when the Incredible String Band were performing there, and travelled down to London with Williamson.

She soon began performing with the band. According to the band's producer Joe Boyd, "the day Robin proposed that Licorice join the group, Mike went out and bought Rose an electric bass. 'Learn this,' he said, 'you're in the group now, too.'" Later, Steve Winwood asked her to play bass on a track of his, but Boyd declined the invitation. "I wasn't a competent enough musician, and Joe knew it. Joe put him off, but I was grateful," she later said. She also sang and played violin, percussion, guitar, organ, mandolin and recorder.

She left the group in 1971, planning to take up sound engineering, but instead starting a family. She later worked in various jobs, including the Probation Service.

In 1994, as the partner of a Liberal Democrat councillor who was the Mayor, she took on the largely honorary role of Lady Mayoress of Aberystwyth in Wales, an event which received wide publicity. During that period of her life, she lived in the Welsh village of Llanon, in a house on the main A487 coast road.

She gained a PhD degree in German Literature at the University of Aberystwyth, and has lectured there on the work of 1930s authors Ina Seidel and Vicki Baum. She was awarded the Postgraduate Teacher Award in 2014.

As of 2019, she lived in Totnes, Devon. Her memoir of her time in the Incredible String Band was published in 2020. She celebrated her 80th birthday by giving a paper at the 2025 Women in German Studies conference in Aberystwyth.
