= Licorice McKechnie =

Scottish musician (born 1945, missing since 1987)

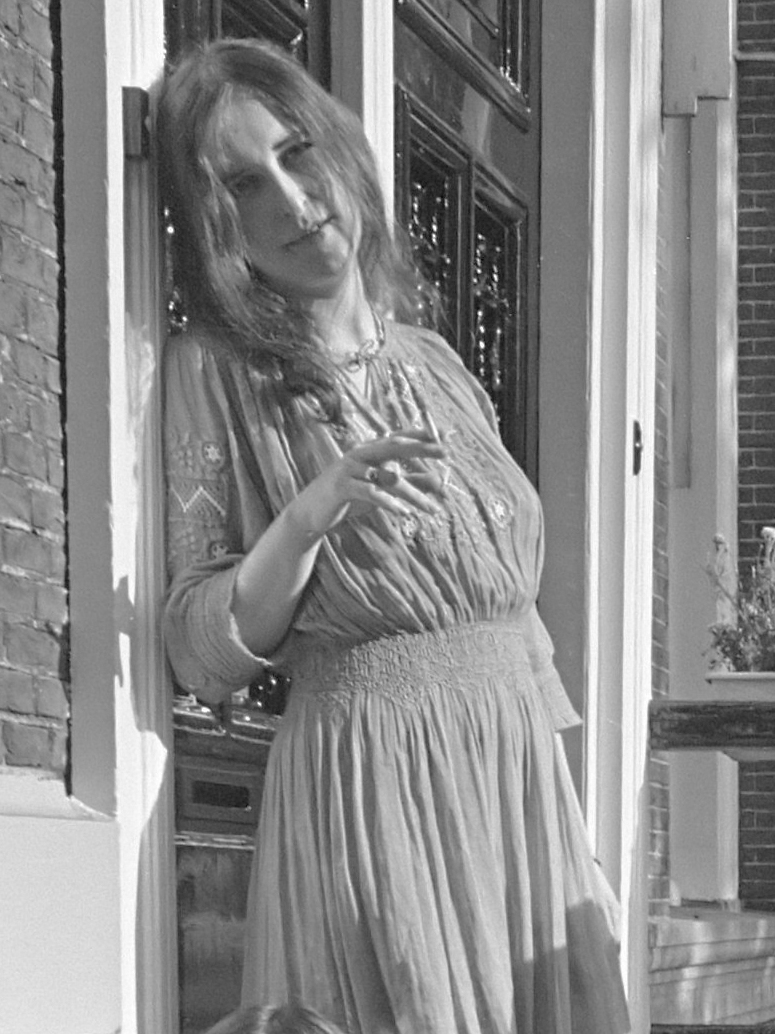
- McKechnie in 1970

Background information
- Also known as: Likky Lambert; Likky McKechnie
- Born: Christina McKechnie; 2 October 1945; Edinburgh, Scotland
- Occupation: Musician
- Instruments: Vocals; keyboards; guitar; drums
- Years active: 1967–1977

Christina "Licorice" McKechnie (born 2 October 1945) is a Scottish musician. She was a singer and songwriter in the Incredible String Band between 1968 and 1972. Her whereabouts have been unknown since 1987, when she was last seen hitchhiking across the Arizona desert in the U.S.

== Early life ==
McKechnie was born in Edinburgh, Scotland. After reading her poetry at folk clubs in the city, she met the musician Robin Williamson, but left home in her teens with the intention of marrying Bert Jansch. The banns were published but the wedding never took place. Jansch left her behind to travel to Morocco in 1963, and, according to Williamson, "she fell into [my] arms".

== Career ==
She was asked by Williamson to join his group the Incredible String Band, which at the time was a duo consisting of him and Mike Heron, as a vocalist and percussionist in 1967. Her first contribution to the band came in the form of backing vocals on the track "Painting Box", on the 1967 album The 5000 Spirits or the Layers of the Onion. By 1968, she was regarded as a fully-fledged member of the band, usually as a backing singer and percussionist, and she performed with them at the Woodstock Festival in August 1969. Some of her original compositions, including "I Know You" from their 1970 double album U, were recorded by the band. By 1972 she had left the band, after her relationship with Williamson ended.

In 1974, McKechnie appeared onstage at a Church of Scientology concert in East Grinstead with Mike Garson, Woody Woodmansey, Leonard Halliwell and others, before moving to California and joining the Silver Moon Band. She married the musician Brian Lambert; they later divorced. She appeared with Williamson and his Merry Band in 1977 and is credited as "Likky Lambert" on the 1977 album Journey's Edge, before joining Woody Woodmansey's band U-Boat.

== Disappearance ==
She visited Edinburgh in 1986 to see her family, but her whereabouts have been unknown since 1990 when, according to her sister, she was in Sacramento, California, apparently recovering from surgery. The music journalist Mark Ellen wrote in Mojo magazine in 2000 that she was "last seen in 1987 hitchhiking across the Arizona Desert. Not even her family has heard from her since." Fellow former Incredible String Band member Rose Simpson was quoted as saying "There's a possibility she may be dead."

In an interview many years later, her ex-husband, Brian Lambert, revealed a secret he kept "quiet for many, many years" that McKechnie "just wanted to have a new life". He also mentioned that she suffered from mental health problems, including schizophrenia, and at one point willingly decided to become homeless: "She literally made a conscious decision to become homeless, she would sleep in vacant lots. One time I found her asleep in the back of my house. She wasn't upset. She would have a waitress job from time to time to make money. But she just loved being homeless."

== See also ==
- List of people who disappeared mysteriously (1980s)
