= Sound Techniques =

Recording studio in London, England 1965–1976

Coordinates: 51.484341°N 0.172102°W

Sound Techniques was a recording studio in Chelsea, London that was operational between 1965 and 1976. Housed in a former dairy, it was founded by recording engineers Geoff Frost and John Wood. The studio became well known as the place where many of the folk-rock acts signed to Joe Boyd's Witchseason publishing company, such as Fairport Convention, Nick Drake and John Martyn, recorded their albums in the late 1960s and early 1970s, but it was also the studio where early records by Pink Floyd, Elton John and Jethro Tull were made.

== History ==
Geoff Frost and John Wood had both been working at Levy's Sound Studio in the centre of London. When studio owner Morris Levy sold the studio in 1964, the pair decided that they would start their own studio. Frost left Levy's in September 1964 and began looking for premises for the studio while the pair raised funds to start the company. They registered the name of the company in December 1964, with Wood explaining to Sound on Sound magazine in 2008 where the name came from:

"Geoff rang me up from Peter Godfrey's office, who was our solicitor, saying, 'We've got to have a name for the company!', and I'm sitting in the control room at Levy's, and there's a Pultec on the rack and an Altec compressor and I see Pulse Techniques underneath Pultec so I said, 'Well, what about Sotec or Sound Techniques?' and that's literally where our name came from. And it was a great name!"

Frost eventually found a property that had been a former dairy located at 46a Old Church Street, Chelsea, London, with both the first and second floors available to lease. Wood left Levy's and the pair knocked out the middle of the second floor to obtain a high ceiling from the first floor in the centre of the room, and created a workshop and a control room from the two remaining sections of the second floor, both accessed via stairways from the first floor. With a limited budget, Wood and Frost designed and built most of the equipment themselves, utilising Frost's experience as chief engineer at Levy's. The studio opened its doors for business in mid-1965.

In addition to building the mixing desk at Sound Techniques, Frost and his team (including engineer Vernon Morris) manufactured desks for other studios such as the Music Centre and Trident Studios. The early desks were made in the workshop above the Sound Techniques recording studio, and whenever recording was in progress a red light would go on in the workshop and work would stop. In 1969 manufacturing would move to a mass production facility at a small factory in Mildenhall, Suffolk.

Sound Techniques gained a reputation for the sound it could obtain for string sections, following a commission from composer Philip Green. The studio also began to gain regular work from Elektra Records, and Wood became friends with Elektra's UK office manager, Joe Boyd. When Boyd started his Witchseason production company and signed with Island Records, many of his artists also recorded at Sound Techniques, notably Nick Drake and Fairport Convention (and the subsequent records made by the group's former members such as Richard Thompson and Sandy Denny).

Other acts also recorded at Sound Techniques in their early days before finding fame. The first two singles by Pink Floyd, "Arnold Layne" and "See Emily Play", were both recorded at Sound Techniques in 1967. Jethro Tull's debut album This Was was recorded at Sound Techniques in 1968. In 1970 during his early career as a session musician, Elton John recorded an album of songs written by the artists on Witchseason, as an attempt to make them more widely known through a more commercial style.

The studio closed in 1976 when the lease on the building ran out and Frost and Wood were unable to purchase the property due to lack of funds.

A documentary film about the studio, provisionally titled The Parts You Don't Hear and directed by Neil Innes and Nick Turner, began development in 2014.

== Partial list of artists who recorded at Sound Techniques ==
- Vashti Bunyan
- John Cale (Fear, Slow Dazzle and Helen of Troy)
- Sandy Denny
- Nick Drake
- Fairport Convention
- Focus
- Hard Meat
- The Incredible String Band
- Jack the Lad
- Jethro Tull (This Was)
- Elton John
- Magna Carta
- Beverley Martyn
- John Martyn
- Christy Moore
- Nico (The End...)
- Pentangle
- Pink Floyd ("See Emily Play")
- Gerry Rafferty
- Soft Machine
- Stackridge (Friendliness)
- Steeleye Span
- Cat Stevens
- Richard Thompson
- The Who
- The Yardbirds
