= Mike Heron =

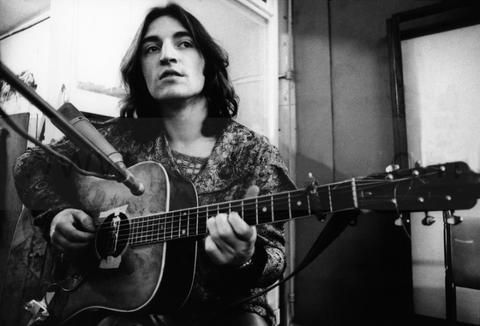

Background information
- Born: James Michael Heron; 27 December 1942 (age 83); Edinburgh, Scotland
- Occupations: Singer, songwriter
- Instruments: Vocals, guitar, keyboards, sitar, harmonica, bass, mandolin
- Years active: 1965–onwards

James Michael Heron (born 27 December 1942) is a Scottish singer, songwriter and multi-instrumentalist, best known for his work in the psychedelic folk Incredible String Band, being the lead singer, playing the guitar, sitar, harmonica and more in the 1960s and 1970s.

== Career ==
Heron was born in Edinburgh, Scotland, and attended the Royal High School, Edinburgh and later George Heriot's School in Edinburgh, where his father was a teacher. He spent a year at the University of Edinburgh before leaving to start training as an accountant. He played in R&B and pop bands in Edinburgh, including the Saracens and, in late 1965, successfully auditioned to join a new trio, the Incredible String Band, with Robin Williamson and Clive Palmer. Heron has said that "It was an exploring era in the Sixties and people were rebelling from the boring pop stuff into folk and blues and world music. You couldn't sit down and listen to Buddy Holly and pass the joint around. So we tried to make the kind of music we felt was missing from our lives, that fitted with the hippy lifestyle."

Heron has also released a number of solo recordings, mostly more rock-oriented than the Incredible String Band material. The first of these, Smiling Men with Bad Reputations, released in 1971, when he was still a member of the ISB, took eclecticism to a new extreme, blending rock, folk and world music into an atmospheric whole. Contributing musicians included Pete Townshend, Keith Moon, Duncan Browne and Ronnie Lane (as "Tommy & the Bijoux"), John Cale, Richard Thompson, Dave Mattacks, Simon Nicol, Dave Pegg, Dudu Pukwana, Elton John, and Steve Winwood.

The Incredible String Band broke up in September 1974. With three other members of the final "electric" ISB lineup – Graham Forbes, John Gilston, and Malcolm Le Maistre — he formed the band Mike Heron's Reputation, later known simply as Heron (not to be confused with Heron (band)), with whom he recorded and toured until 1977. In 1977–78, while still living in the Glen Row cottage near Innerleithen which had been the Incredible String Band's home and headquarters, he recorded songs which were eventually issued as The Glen Row Tapes. In 1979, he released a solo album on Casablanca Records. He then withdrew from performance for several years. In the 1990s he re-emerged with a new group, Mike Heron's Incredible Acoustic Band, and released the album Where the Mystics Swim.

In 2017, Heron and a friend, poet and author Andrew Greig, published a memoir entitled You Know What You Could Be: Tuning into the 1960s. Heron's part of the book, an account of his life from 1957 to 1966, occupies pages 5–104.

== Solo discography ==
- Smiling Men with Bad Reputations (1971)
- Mike Heron's Reputation (as Mike Heron's Reputation) (1975)
- Diamond of Dreams (as Heron) (1977)
- Mike Heron (1979)
- The Glen Row Tapes (1988)
- Where the Mystics Swim (as Mike Heron's Incredible Acoustic Band) (1996)
- Conflict of Emotions (1998)
- Futurefield (2002)
- Echo Coming Back (2005)
