= San Francisco (1968 film) =

1968 British film by Anthony Stern

- Directed by: Anthony Stern
- Written by: Anthony Stern
- Produced by: Iris Sawyer; Jeremy Mitchell; Alan Callan
- Cinematography: Anthony Stern
- Edited by: Anthony Stern; Anthony Sloman
- Music by: Pink Floyd
- Production company: British Film Institute
- Release date: 1968
- Running time: 15 min
- Country: United Kingdom

San Francisco is a 1968 impressionistic documentary short film directed by Anthony Stern.

The film, cut to a version of "Interstellar Overdrive" as performed by Pink Floyd in 1966, pioneered the use of 16mm single frame cinematography in the late 1960s.

The film was produced by the British Film Institute (BFI) and by Iris Sawyer, Jeremy Mitchell, and Alan Callan.

== Reception ==
The Monthly Film Bulletin wrote: "Anthony Stern's film revives the 'city symphony', a genre that dates back to the early avant-garde film-making. The city images he chooses range from the banal (supermarkets, neon signs) and the tourist cliché to a specially staged pseudo-occult game involving a nude girl. However, the subject is no more than an excuse for a display of virtuoso technique, whose speed is presumably in response to the frenetic pace of city life – an observation neither novel nor especially relevant to San Francisco. Stern's photography is his main strength: fast motion or long clusters of single frames occasionally slowing to normal speed for a single image of a striking face or location. He also uses a technique familiar from his collaboration with Peter Whitehead on Tonite Let's All Make Love in London – the jerky re-animation of frozen frames; and the filmis edited to the same version of The Pink Floyd's 'Interstellar Overdrive' as used in Whitehead's film. Stern's techniques seem to be more of a means without an end; and even on its simplest level, as a fast coloured lightshow, the film lacks the wit and subtlety found in such American antecedents as Ben van Meter's Up Tight, L.A. is Burning . . . Shit."

== Accolades ==
The film won awards for cinematography at the 1969 Oberhausen Short Film Festival, the 1969 Melbourne International Film Festival, and the Sydney Film Festival.
