= Tonite Let's All Make Love in London =

Tonite Let's All Make Love in London may refer to:

- Tonite Let's All Make Love in London (film)
- Tonite Let's All Make Love in London (soundtrack)
