= Tonite Let's All Make Love in London (soundtrack) =

1968 soundtrack album

Soundtrack album by various artists
- Released: 18 July 1968
- Recorded: January–May 1967
- Genres: Psychedelic rock, interviews
- Length: 24:17 (original release); 61:42 (1990 re-release); 39:17 (1991 re-release)
- Language: English
- Label: Instant
- Producer: Joe Boyd (Pink Floyd tracks)

Pink Floyd soundtracks chronology
The Committee (1968)	Tonite Let's All Make Love in London (1968)	More (1969)

Professional ratings
Review scores
Source	Rating
AllMusic	3/5 stars

Tonite Let's All Make Love in London is a soundtrack album released on LP in 1968, for the 1967 documentary film of the same name, made by Peter Whitehead about the "swinging London" scene of the sixties. The film consists of a series of psychedelic performances and interviews and features live performance by Pink Floyd, together with footage of John Lennon, Yoko Ono, Mick Jagger, Vanessa Redgrave, Lee Marvin, Julie Christie, Allen Ginsberg, Eric Burdon, Michael Caine and many others attending one of the band's concerts.

== Reissues ==
In 1990 See for Miles Records released an expanded version of the soundtrack on CD under the title Tonite Let's All Make Love in London ...Plus (Catalog Number: SEEK 258). The album included most of the tracks from Tonite Let's All Make Love in London. "Have You Seen Your Mother, Baby, Standing in the Shadow?" and "Lady Jane" by the Rolling Stones are featured in the movie but not on any version of the soundtrack album. "Interstellar Overdrive" which had only appeared in a 3.02 edited form on the original release was replaced by the previously unreleased 16:46 full-length version. Another long and previously unreleased instrumental track by Pink Floyd, the 11:50 "Nick's Boogie", was also included in this release, together with the interviews that appear in the film.

Other versions of this soundtrack have also been released. In 1996, Power House 2001 Records released a CD under the name, Pink Floyd & Friends – Interstellar Overdrive that includes the full 16:49 "Interstellar Overdrive" and "Nick's Boogie" (at 11:47) by Pink Floyd, plus an interview with Mick Jagger and an introductory reading by Allen Ginsberg called "Tonight Let's All Make Love in London". However, there are other tracks by Fleetwood Mac, the Nice, the Moody Blues and others that did not appear on the original album or the See for Miles reissue. In 1998 both of the full extended Pink Floyd tracks were released as a bonus disc in the book "The Progressive Rock Files" by Canadian radio host Jerry Lucky.

To help promote Tonite Let's All Make Love in London...Plus, the interviews with Michael Caine and Lee Marvin and the two extended instrumental tracks, "Nick's Boogie" and "Interstellar Overdrive", were also released as a Pink Floyd CD. While the sleeve for the Pink Floyd release of Tonite Let's All Make Love in London...Plus states 'Mini Promotion – CD Sampler' this item was in fact a full release and was available for sale in many independent record stores. The interviews are also as one track, thus the CD has three tracks, although the booklet incorrectly lists the interviews as two separate tracks.

== Soundtrack albums' track listings ==
=== Tonite Let's All Make Love in London. (1968) (Instant Records) ===
==== Side One ====
1. Pink Floyd – "Interstellar Overdrive" (Barrett/Mason/Waters/Wright) – 3:02
  This is the edited version of the almost 17 minutes long early take of the song, which is released on the London '66-'67 album and the See for Miles Records release Tonite Let's All Make Love in London ...plus
2. Marquess of Kensington – "Changing of the Guard" (Leander/Mills) – 3:06
3. Twice as Much – "Night Time Girl" (Skinner/Rose) – 3:00
4. Chris Farlowe – "Out of Time" (Jagger/Richards) – 3:36

==== Side Two ====
1. Pink Floyd – "Interstellar Overdrive" (Reprise) (Barrett) – 0:33
  A clip from the beginning of the 17-minute-long "Interstellar Overdrive" take.
2. Vashti – "Winter Is Blue" (Bunyan/Skinner) – 3:21
3. Chris Farlowe – "Paint It Black" (Jagger/Richards) – 3:35
4. The Small Faces – "Here Come the Nice" (Marriott/Lane) – 3:10
5. Pink Floyd – "Interstellar Overdrive" (Reprise) (Barrett) – 0:54
  A clip from the beginning of the 17-minute-long "Interstellar Overdrive" take.

=== Tonite Let's All Make Love in London...Plus (1990) (See for Miles Records) ===
The See for Miles release

1. Pink Floyd – "Interstellar Overdrive" (Full Length Version) (Barrett/Mason/Waters/Wright) – 16:49
2. "Michael Caine" interview – 0:09
3. Marquis of Kensington – "Changing of the Guard" (Leander/Mills) – 2:52
4. Twice as Much – "Night Time Girl" (Skinner/Rose) – 2:41
5. "Interview: 'Dolly Bird'" – 0:52
6. Chris Farlowe – "Out of Time" (Jagger/Richard) – 3:04
7. "Interview: Edna O'Brien" – 2:23
8. Pink Floyd – "Interstellar Overdrive" (reprise) (Barrett) – 0:33
9. "Andrew Loog Oldham" interview – 0:22
10. Vashti – "Winter Is Blue" (Bunyan/Skinner) – 1:27
11. "Interview: Andrew Loog Oldham" – 1:22
12. Vashti – "Winter Is Blue" (Reprise) (Bunyan/Skinner) – 1:23
13. "Interview: Mick Jagger" – 3:15
14. "Interview: Julie Christie" – 0:46
15. "Interview: Michael Caine" – 1:29
16. Chris Farlowe – "Paint It Black" (Jagger/Richard) – 3:28
17. "Interview: Alan Aldridge" – 0:46
18. Chris Farlowe – "Paint It Black (Instrumental Reprise)" (Jagger/Richard) – 0:13
19. "David Hockney" interview – 0:09
20. The Small Faces – "Here Comes the Nice" (Marriott/Lane) – 3:00
21. "Lee Marvin" interview – 0:46
22. Pink Floyd – "Interstellar Overdrive" (Reprise 2) (Barrett) – 0:54
23. Allen Ginsberg – "Tonite Let's All Make Love in London" (Ginsberg) – 1:09
24. Pink Floyd – "Nick's Boogie" (Mason) – 11:50

=== Tonite Let's All Make Love in London (1991) (Immediate Sound) ===
1. Pink Floyd – "Interstellar Overdrive" (Barrett/Mason/Waters/Wright) – 3:09
2. Michael Caine Interview – 0:09
3. Marquess of Kensington – "Changing of the Guard" (Leander/Mills) – 2:53
4. Twice as Much – "Night Time Girl" (Skinner/Rose) – 2:41
5. "Dolly Bird" Interview – 0:52
6. Chris Farlowe – "Out of Time" (Jagger/Richard) – 3:05
7. Edna O'Brien Interview – 2:23
8. Pink Floyd – "Interstellar Overdrive" (Reprise) (Barrett) – 0:34
9. Andrew Loog Oldham Interview – 0:22
10. Vashti Bunyan – "Winter Is Blue" (Bunyan/Skinner) – 1:28
11. Andrew Loog Oldham Interview – 1:22
12. Vashti Bunyan – "Winter Is Blue" (Bunyan/Skinner) – 1:24
13. Eric Burdon and The Animals – "When I Was Young" (Briggs/Burdon/Jenkins/McQuilock/Weider) – 2:58
14. Mick Jagger Interview – 3:15
15. Julie Christie Interview – 0:46
16. Michael Caine Interview – 1:30
17. Chris Farlowe – "Paint It Black" (Jagger/Richard) – 3:29
18. Alan Aldridge Interview – 0:46
19. Chris Farlowe – "Paint It Black" (Instrumental Reprise) (Jagger/Richard) – 0:13
20. David Hockney Interview – 0:09
21. Small Faces – "Here Comes the Nice" (Marriott/Lane) – 3:01
22. Lee Marvin Interview – 0:45
23. Pink Floyd – "Interstellar Overdrive (Reprise)" (Barrett) – 0:55
24. Allen Ginsberg – "Tonite Let's All Make Love in London" (Ginsberg) – 1:08
