= Just Another Diamond Day =

1970 studio album by Vashti Bunyan

Studio album by Vashti Bunyan
- Released: 20 December 1970
- Recorded: November–December 1969
- Studios: Sound Techniques, London
- Genre: Folk
- Length: 31:24 (original release); 39:17 (CD reissue)
- Label: Philips
- Producer: Joe Boyd

Vashti Bunyan chronology
Just Another Diamond Day (1970)	Lookaftering (2005)

Just Another Diamond Day is the debut studio album by the English folk singer-songwriter Vashti Bunyan, and was released on Philips Records in December 1970. Much of the album is a musical reflection on Bunyan and travelling partner Robert Lewis's experiences while travelling by horse and wagon through Scotland in 1968. It highlighted Bunyan's vocals with minimal instrumental accompaniment that was arranged by contemporary musical artists supervised under record producer Joe Boyd.

Upon release, Just Another Diamond Day went relatively unnoticed. Stricken by the demoralising and disillusioning outcome, Bunyan began a self-imposed exile from the music industry to live a low-profile lifestyle. Over the years, the album has received more attention among record collectors, resulting in reissues that sparked a revival in Bunyan's music career. Although it was largely overlooked by the public at the time of its release, the album's critical standing has improved over the years and today Just Another Diamond Day is now by many considered one of the best works in British folk.

== Background ==
Vashti Bunyan had initially appeared on the English music scene in 1965 after meeting record producer Andrew Loog Oldham with a promising assortment of original material. Even with the hype boasting that Bunyan could replace Marianne Faithfull, who had recently departed Decca Records, her debut single, the Jagger–Richards-penned "Some Things Just Stick in Your Mind", did not achieve much critical traction. Sensing a follow-up release would not materialize, Bunyan decided to depart Oldham's stable to record with Peter Snell. Bunyan recorded "Train Song", the melody of which stemmed from her own composition, "17 Pink Elephants", with lyrics written by folkie Alastair Clayre. Upon release, however, "Train Song" failed to fulfil Bunyan's vision of her acoustic arrangements appealing to pop culture as the single was met with the same lack of commercial success as Bunyan's debut. As a result, the brief media exposure surrounding her faded by late 1966, Bunyan detached herself from the London music scene, and had been all but forgotten by mainstream pop audiences.

Shortly after the release of "Train Song", Bunyan found herself without a record label, and with the help of her brother organized a showing of her songs to Peggy Seeger and Ewan MacColl. Bunyan recalled the meeting did not impress the two; however, their suggestions for her inspired Bunyan to pursue the solemn atmosphere present in her music. Hearing word of Donovan's intention to establish a musical commune, Bunyan and fellow bohemian student, Robert Lewis, travelled through Scotland by carriage. Donovan's project never developed; however, the nearly two-year journey gave Bunyan the opportunity to pen an album's worth of material. These songs so impressed record producer Joe Boyd, whom Bunyan happened upon on her travels, that he left her a standing invitation to record them when Bunyan concluded her wandering. Writer Keith Wallace has stated Boyd's abundant experience producing exotic musical acts and expert mixing abilities would prove invaluable as Bunyan came off a long hiatus from recording.

In November 1969, Bunyan returned to England and Boyd organized recording sessions for the subsequent month. Following an extensive day of rehearsals at Sound Techniques, Bunyan completed the entire Just Another Diamond Day album during a work-intensive three-day period in December 1969. Bunyan was joined by a wealth of musicians, including John James, Robert Kirby, Robin Williamson of the Incredible String Band, and Dave Swarbrick and Simon Nicol of Fairport Convention. However, Bunyan's diffident approach resulted in her losing control of the songs' arrangements, and only later did she note her reservations toward the album's lack of precision and production. Music historian Richie Unterberger has remarked that despite the influence of outside artists, the drum-less, acoustic arrangements on Just Another Diamond Day complemented Bunyan's measured and wispy vocals.

== Release and reception ==
Just Another Diamond Day was released in December 1970 in the UK on Philips Records (catalogue item Philips 6308 019). It failed to make an impact on the charts after only a few hundred copies were pressed with little to no advertisement. The demands of having to care for her newborn child effectively barred Bunyan from promoting the album. Frustrated with the public's lack of response, Bunyan abandoned the music industry to live with the Incredible String Band in a vacant house at Glen Row, in Scotland. The album proved to be the last recording made by Bunyan for the next 35 years.

=== Modern reception ===
Professional ratings
Review scores
Source	Rating
About.com	5/5 stars
AllMusic	5/5 stars
Pitchfork	9.0/10
Sputnikmusic	5/5 stars
Q	4/5 stars

Although Just Another Diamond Day was overlooked by the record-buying public at the time of its release, its critical stature has grown substantially over the years. Unterberger, writing for the AllMusic website, described the album as "a pleasing yet overly dainty slice of British rock-tinged folk" and goes on to say it was Bunyan's most serious-minded effort up to that point. In his 2010 book, Electric Eden: Unearthing Britain's Visionary Music, author Rob Young states "Vashti Bunyan's still, small voice of calm, and her bold improvised trek over Britain serves as a powerful symbol of the wider panorama of non-mainstream rock and folk". Young goes on to say that Just Another Diamond Day's themes "existed not in the traditional geographical locations of the British Rock scene...Instead it flowed from zones far more remote: the dual landscape/dreamscape of Britain's interior".

Critic Dave Henderson, writing for Q magazine in 2000, remarked that "Bunyan's voice is lonely, lovelorn and fragile, and with three tracks scored by Nick Drake arranger Robert Kirby this remains an achingly memorable outing". Peter Paphides in his review for Time Out magazine, writing that Just Another Diamond Day "chronicle the odyssey north, which explains the unquenchable optimism". In a glowing review for the Internet publication, Pitchfork, music critic Matthew Murphy describes the album as a "sonic sibling to the Boyd-produced Nick Drake albums-- albeit one that chooses fresh air and sunlight over Drake's depressive shadows", before concluding "it's unlikely that you'll encounter another album as charming or transporting as Just Another Diamond Day any time soon". John Mulvey in NME magazine notes that despite the album's initial commercial failure, its contents "are gifted with a beauty and purity rare even in her contemporaries". The album has been streamed more than 79 million times on Spotify as of January 2026.

=== CD reissue ===
Just Another Diamond Day was officially issued on compact disc for the first time by Spinney Records in 2000. The reissue featured four bonus tracks, including "Love Song", which had been issued as the B-side to her 1966 single. The CD release also included the previously unreleased 1966 demos of "I'd Like to Walk Around in Your Mind" and "Winter Is Blue" (accompanied by Mike Crowther). The final bonus track on the Spinney reissue is a 1969 version of "Iris's Song for Us". The demand for Just Another Diamond Day prompted Bunyan to return to her music career. After recording and performing for the first time in 30 years, Bunyan finally released her follow-up album, Lookaftering on Fat Cat Records.

=== Legacy ===
Just Another Diamond Day was covered by indie folk band Mutual Benefit in 2019.

== Track listing ==
All songs written by Vashti Bunyan, except where noted.

Side one
No.	Title	Writer(s)	Length
1.	"Diamond Day"		1:47
2.	"Glow Worms"		2:16
3.	"Lily Pond"		1:24
4.	"Timothy Grub"		3:15
5.	"Where I Like to Stand"	Bunyan, John James	2:21
6.	"Swallow Song"		2:16
7.	"Window Over the Bay"	Bunyan, Robert Lewis	1:47

Side two
No.	Title	Writer(s)	Length
8.	"Rose Hip November"		2:27
9.	"Come Wind Come Rain"		2:07
10.	"Hebridean Sun"	Bunyan, Robert Lewis	1:13
11.	"Rainbow River"		3:22
12.	"Trawlerman's Song"	Bunyan, Robert Lewis	1:56
13.	"Jog Along Bess"		3:36
14.	"Iris's Song for Us"	Bunyan, Wally Dix, Iris Macfarlane	1:33

2004 remaster bonus tracks
No.	Title	Writer(s)	Length
15.	"Love Song" (B-side to 1966 single "Train Song," produced by Peter Snell)		1:58
16.	"I'd Like to Walk Around in Your Mind" (an unreleased 1967 Immediate Records acetate, produced by Mike Hurst)		2:15
17.	"Winter Is Blue" (an unreleased acetate from 1966; different from Tonite Let's All Make Love in London version)		1:48
18.	"Iris's Song Version Two" (a 1969 alternative version from John Bunyan's tape)	Bunyan, Dix, Macfarlane	2:31

== Personnel ==
- Vashti Bunyan – vocals, acoustic guitar, recorder (4)
- Christopher Sykes – piano (4, 13), organ (8)
- John James – dulcitone (3, 8), organ (5)
- Robin Williamson – fiddle, whistle, Irish harp (3, 8, 13)
- Dave Swarbrick – fiddle, mandolin (5, 9, 14)
- Simon Nicol – banjo (5, 9)
- Mike Crowther – guitar (17)
- Robert Kirby – string and recorder arrangements (1, 6, 11), trumpet (7)

=== Production ===
- Joe Boyd – producer, liner notes
- Jerry Boys – engineer
- John James – cover art
