= The 14 Hour Technicolor Dream =

1967 fundraising concert held in London, U.K

Coordinates: 51°35′39″N 0°7′51″W

The 14 Hour Technicolor Dream was a concert held in the Great Hall of the Alexandra Palace, London, on 29 April 1967. The fund-raising concert for the counterculture paper International Times was organised by Barry Miles, John "Hoppy" Hopkins, David Howson, Mike McInnerney and Jack Henry Moore. It was part-documented by Peter Whitehead in a film called Tonite Let's All Make Love in London.

== History ==
At the time, The 14 Hour Technicolor Dream was described as a multi-artist event, featuring poets, artists and musicians. Pink Floyd headlined the event; other artists billed included: the Crazy World of Arthur Brown, One In A Million, Soft Machine, the Move, Tomorrow, the Pretty Things, Jimmy Powell & the Five Dimensions, Pete Townshend, John's Children, Alexis Korner, Social Deviants, the Purple Gang, Champion Jack Dupree, Graham Bond, Savoy Brown, Ginger Johnson and his African conga drummers, the Creation, Denny Laine, the Block, the Cat, the Flies, Charlie Browns Clowns, Glo Macari and the Big Three, Gary Farr, the Interference, Jacobs Ladder Construction Company, Pale Fire, Ron Geesin, Lincoln Folk Group, Mike Horovitz, Poison Bellows, Christopher Logue, Robert C. Randall, Suzy Creamcheese, Sam Gopal's Dream, Giant Sun Trolley, Simon Vinkenoog, Jean Jaques Lavel, the Stalkers, Utterly Incredible Too Long Ago To Remember Sometimes Shouting At People, Barry Fantoni, Noel Murphy, Dick Gregory, Graham Stevens and Yoko Ono. In the audience watching Ono's performance art that night was John Lennon who attended the event with his friend John Dunbar. Lennon had met Ono half a year earlier, on 7 November 1966, when he attended a private preview of an exhibition of her work entitled "Unfinished Paintings and Objects" at Dunbar's Indica Gallery. Richard Thompson describes attending (shortly before playing his first show with Fairport Convention) in his autobiographical book, Beeswing.

There were two main stages inside the hall, with a smaller central stage designed for poets, performance artists, jugglers, dancers including The Tribe of the Sacred Mushroom), Philippine dancer David Medalla and The Exploding Galaxy Dance Troupe. The largest stage for the main events, constructed along the rear wall, was flanked by the large glass windows of the Palace. Light shows and strobes lit up every inch of available space from a massive light tower at the center of the hall. Underground films, (most notably the Flaming Creatures) were screened on white sheets taped to scaffolding. The center piece was a helter skelter which was rented for the night.

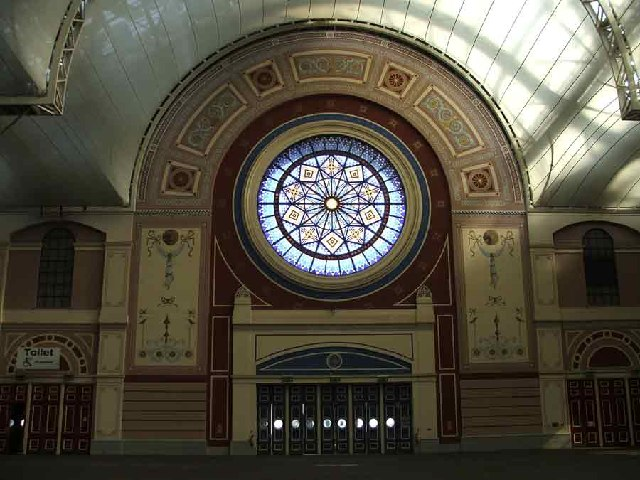
The Great Hall of Alexandra Palace, venue for The 14 Hour Technicolor Dream

Pink Floyd appeared right at the end of the show, just as the sun was beginning to rise at around five o'clock in the morning. The details of the set-list are rather sketchy; however, one source suggests that they played "Astronomy Domine", "Arnold Layne", "Interstellar Overdrive", "Nick's Boogie", and other material from their then unreleased debut album, The Piper at the Gates of Dawn. Apparently, Pink Floyd members were exhausted from playing another gig in the Netherlands that same night and arrived at Alexandra Palace at around three in the morning.

A film crew were on hand to capture footage of the event, some of which was shown as part of the BBC show Man Alive, about the concert. A short excerpt of The New Animals can be seen performing, as can John Lennon in the crowd. Photos of Pink Floyd's set clearly show that some of theirs was also filmed, but the footage has never been seen.

A song named after the event was released by The Syn.

On Saturday 6 December 1997, a celebration of the 30th anniversary of the 14 Hour Technicolor Dream took place at the Institute of Contemporary Arts, London. Conceived and produced by performance artist and musician Malcolm Boyle; The Recurring Technicolor Dream featured a number of the bands who originally played in 1967, including The Crazy World of Arthur Brown and John's Children. There were film screenings by Peter Whitehead and a talk featuring original Technicolor Dream organiser John "Hoppy" Hopkins, Mike Horovitz, Charles Shaar Murray and Jenny Fabian chaired by the author and critic Lucy O'Brien. Link Leisure and Marcus Gogarty created psychedelic installations and there were more modern takes on underground culture represented by Bruce Gilbert, Paul Kendall, Ausgang, Zwang Taboo and drum and bass DJs. There was performance and live art from Jane Turner, Mark Waugh and Graham Duff. Malcolm Boyle also performed his own one-man show The Madcap - a biography of Pink Floyd's Syd Barrett.

On 21 April 2007, the 40th anniversary of this event was again celebrated at the Institute of Contemporary Arts, London. This time The Pretty Things and Arthur Brown played; in addition, there was a repeat performance of Malcolm Boyle's The Madcap and showings of rare films and more talks from several of the original sixties faces and attendees of the Alexandra Palace event. In the spirit of the original event, there was also an all-night after-party in a secret location organised by promoters Sleep All Day Drive All Night.

== See also ==
- Games for May
