= Here Come the Nice =

- West German picture sleeve

Single by Small Faces
- B-side: "Talk to You"
- Released: 2 June 1967
- Recorded: 8–12 May 1967
- Studio: Olympic, London
- Genre: Psychedelic pop
- Length: 3:06
- Label: Immediate
- Songwriters: Steve Marriott; Ronnie Lane
- Producers: Steve Marriott; Ronnie Lane

Small Faces singles chronology
"Patterns" (1967)	"Here Come the Nice" (1967)	"Itchycoo Park" (1967)

Audio
- "Here Come the Nice" on YouTube

"Here Come the Nice" (Note: The single has often been misquoted as "Here Comes the Nice" due to a sleeve misprint.) is a song by the English rock band Small Faces. Written by guitarist Steve Marriott and bass guitarist Ronnie Lane, it was released as a single on 2 June 1967, through Immediate Records. The song, which was the band's debut on Immediate, was their first promoted release of 1967, following feuds with Decca Records. It marked a distinct turning point for Small Faces' career, being their first single to deliberately venture into psychedelia, though they had previously done that on a few album tracks for Decca. The song's subject regarding a drug dealer somehow bypassed the BBC censors, who did not ban it, which resulted in the song managing to chart at number 12 on the UK Singles Chart during the summer of 1967. The song received mostly good reviews from music critics, with many positively noting the change of genres.

The song is also known for its distinct outro, which was done through electro-mechanical studio processes, similar to how the band would experiment with flanging on their follow-up single "Itchycoo Park", which was released shortly after. Nonetheless, "Here Come the Nice" became one of Small Faces' best known recordings and, although it failed to chart within the top 10 in the United Kingdom, the song ultimately led the band to continue producing psychedelic songs for the rest of their career. Despite not charting on either the Billboard Hot 100 or the Cashbox Top 100, the song was eventually included on the United States-only album There Are But Four Small Faces, released approximately ten months afterward, and was also included on the soundtrack of Peter Whitehead's Tonite Let's All Make Love in London in 1968.

== Background and development ==
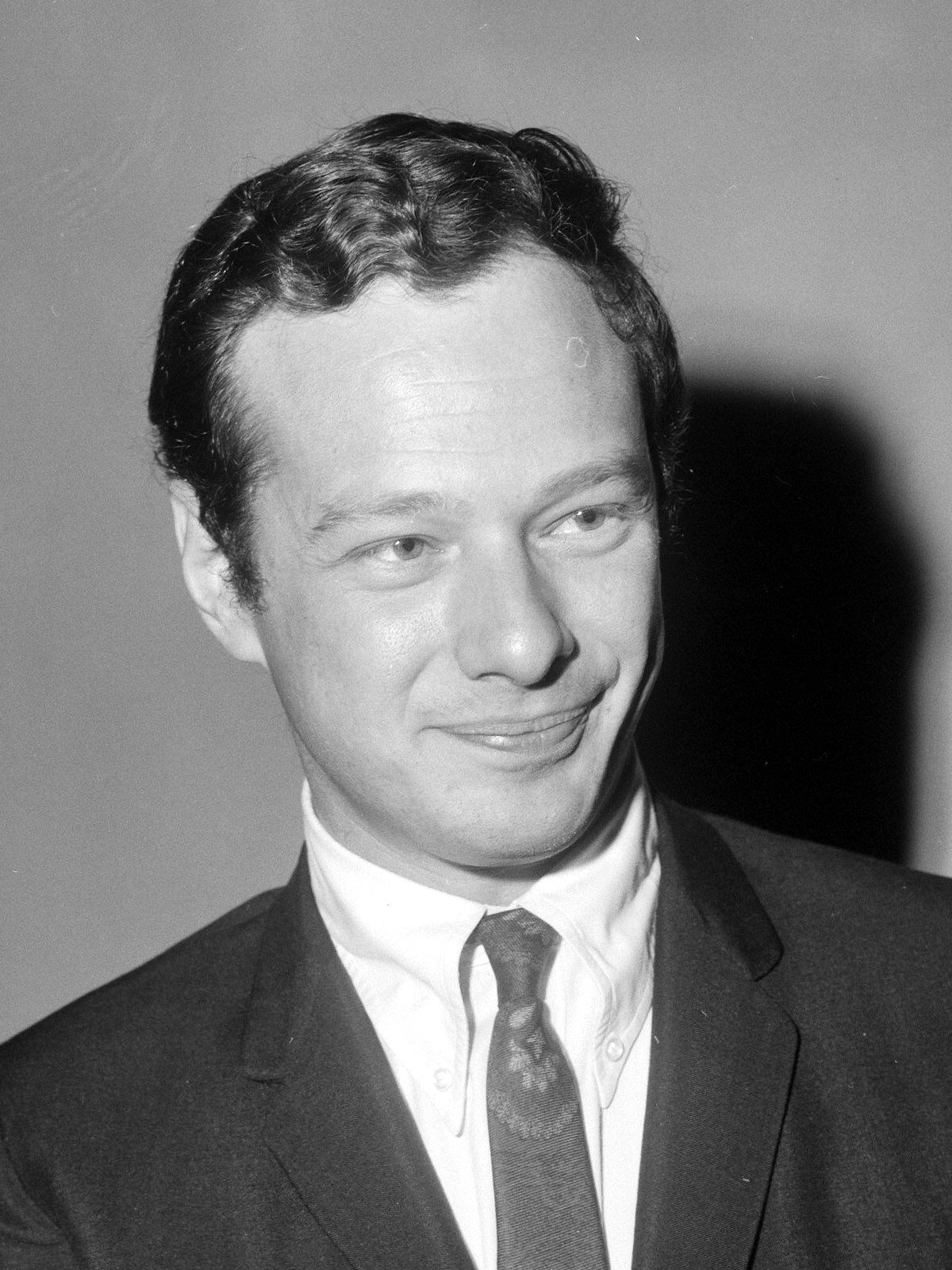
Brian Epstein introduced Small Faces to LSD.

By 1967, popular musical genres had started changing, and Small Faces' initially strong mod following had begun decreasing as a result. Psychedelic drugs had become popular among both various subcultures and bands. Small Faces had by now been introduced to LSD, during a party at their residence on 11 May 1966, the same day as the release of their debut studio album Small Faces. On that day, the Beatles' manager Brian Epstein, a regular visitor to the band, along with the Moody Blues' drummer Graeme Edge visited Small Faces at their residence, located at 22 Westmoreland Terrace in Pimlico, following a meeting with Edge at Decca Studios in West Hampstead.

At the residence, Epstein passed orange slices on a plate around to the various band members, who all accepted them, with the exception of drummer Kenney Jones. (Note: Jones instead claims that his first introduction to LSD occurred when Marriott spiked his drink at IBC Studios.) Keyboardist Ian McLagan recalled that the band's reaction to the drug varied; he states that while Lane overlooked the river River Thames, Marriott planned on going to Manchester to visit his girlfriend. However, Marriott apparently had a bad trip under the drug and eventually Small Faces, along with Mick O'Sullivan, took Marriott to Euston railway station where he went on a train to Manchester. Although they had a negative first impression of the drug, it became an important factor for the band's music.

Small Faces had begun composing new music, including some psychedelic tracks. These included "That Man", "Yesterday, Today and Tomorrow", "(Tell Me) Have You Ever Seen Me?", "Green Circles" and "My Way of Giving". However, during the composing time, they began to grow bitter with their record label Decca Records along with Manager Don Arden, who the band felt cheated them. The reason was because although he had given them a salary of £20 a week, along with accounts at Carnaby Street clothing stores, Small Faces failed to see income from performances or royalties from any of their singles. The two final straws came when their parents confronted Arden, to which he responded that the Small Faces were using drugs, and when the band heard "My Mind's Eye" on the radio, which was a demo they would send in to Arden, not hoping to release it.

However, hope came when Andrew Loog Oldham's label Immediate Records decided to buy Small Faces' contract for £25 000 from Decca, which was announced on 11 February 1967 in a New Musical Express article. With Immediate, Small Faces were granted unlimited studio time and finally got the royalties they needed. Small Faces still owed Decca one more song, which eventually was released with "I Can't Make It", a song that they made no attempt in promoting; it stalled at number 26 on the UK Singles Chart.

== Composition and recording ==
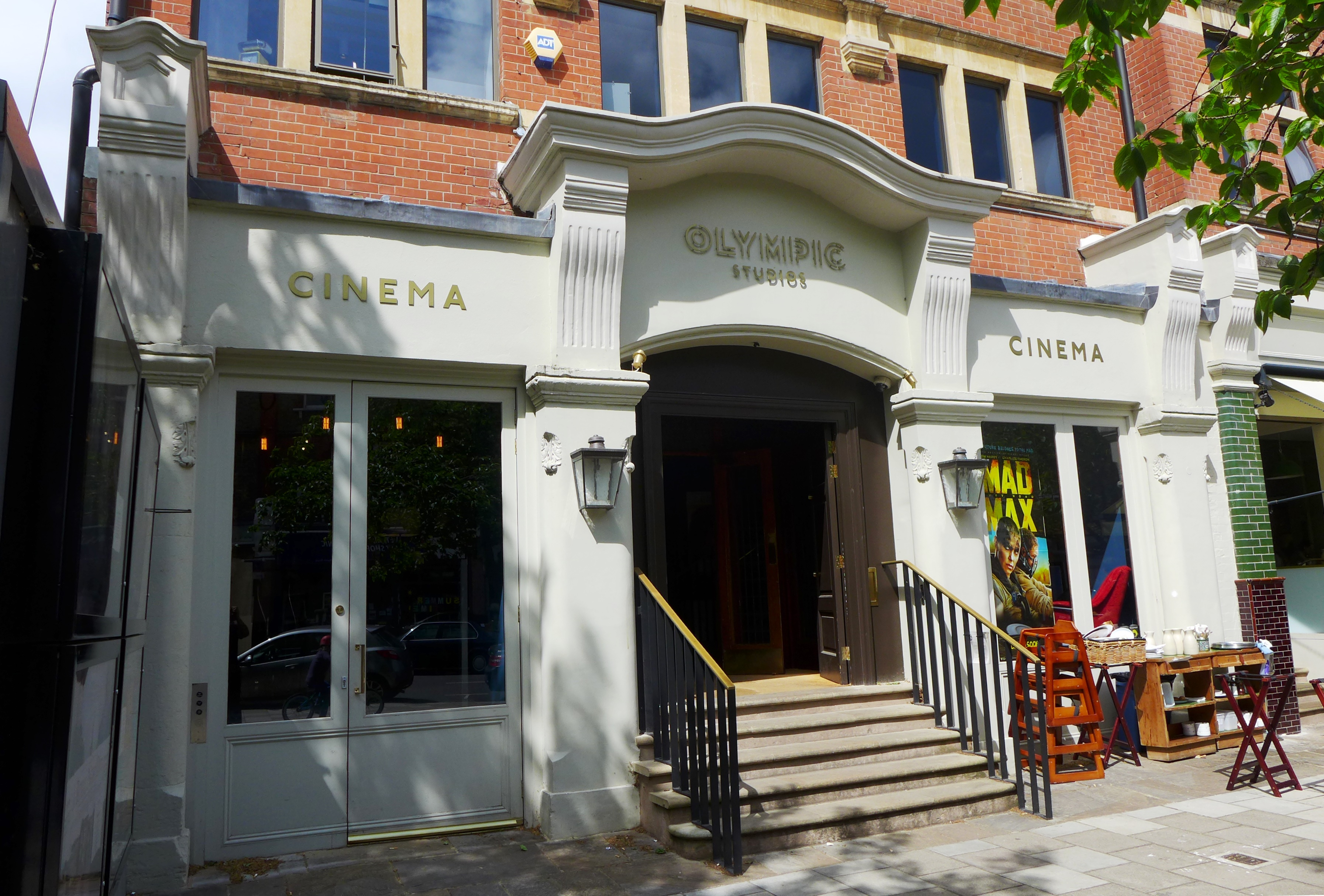
"Here Come the Nice" was recorded at Olympic Studios, Barnes.

The title "Here Come the Nice" comes from the comedian Lord Buckley monologue, "Here Comes Da Nazz". Marriott had first heard the phrase in 1965 when he, original keyboardist Jimmy Winston and Winston's girlfriend spent time together at her apartment. According to McLagan, Marriott had an extremely catholic taste in music, deriving inspiration from several artists and sources, and he also says that Buckley "rapped" it. He further states that "Nazz" was slang for Jesus. The song features a line which alludes to drug use; "He makes me feel like no-one else could, He knows what I want, He's got what I need, He's always there if I need some speed." The phrase "speed" is a synonym for the central nervous system stimulant drug Amphetamine. However, in a 2014 interview with Uncut, McLagan stated that it refers to Methadrine, an alternate form of Methamphetamine, which McLagan said was one of "all kinds of chemicals" they were using, with him wanting to express about what drugs were being used by him at the time. The song also references a dealer in the opening verse, which McLagan admitted was written as a nod towards them.

Although it was called a psychedelic pop song by AllMusic critic Lindsay Planer, Hewitt and Hellier identified it as a "swaggering soul-pop" record that contains trademarks of their earlier music. Bruce Eder of AllMusic attributes this to the increased amount of studio time that they had received after signing Immediate, which eventually "loosened" their sound. For the song, McLagan had purchased a Hammond M102 specifically to record it, drawing inspiration from Booker T. Jones' playing on Booker T. & the M.G.'s 1962 single "Green Onions". Small Faces recorded the song during sporadic sessions at Olympic Studios between 8 and 12 May 1967, with Eddie Kramer and Glyn Johns assisting as studio engineers. Marriott and Lane handled production of the song.

"Here Comes the Nice" has also been noted for its innovative ending – instead of the customary fade out, it uses a combination of studio effects to simulate the inevitable "come-down" from the speed "high". The effect was created by editing two elements together – the first element was created by using the variable speed control on the master tape recorder to slow down the playback of the song's final chord, which slides down rapidly in pitch before an abrupt cut to the second element, a sequence of crashing, chaotic sounds created by striking and strumming on resonating piano strings. The mono and stereo mixes of the song differ slightly in the timing of the effect, with the 'pitch drop' effect coming in slightly earlier on the mono mix than in the stereo mix. Jones attributes this to "their four arses sitting down together on the keys of an old upright".

== Release and commercial performance ==
Although "Here Come the Nice" was first announced as a single through New Musical Express and Melody Maker in their 27 May 1967 issues, "Green Circles" was initially announced by Melody Maker to most likely become the band's debut Immediate single, scheduled to eventually be released later that same month. This was a contrast from initial plans, when either "Something I Want to Tell You" or "(Tell Me) Have You Ever Seen Me?" were planned to become their debut singles on Immediate. However, when May 1967 eventually came, NME listed "Green Circles" as the B-side of "Here Come the Nice", while Melody Maker correctly listed "Talk to You" as the B-side. On 26 May of that year, "Patterns", backed by "E Too D", (Note: Catalogue number Decca F12619.) was released by Decca Records. The release was only conceived by Decca in order to capitalize on Small Faces' success, along with deliberately attempting to hinder the band's chart success with "Here Come the Nice". The song, comparable to the music they made in 1966, was quickly publicly denounced by Small Faces; similarly to "I Can't Make It", they did not promote it.

Small Faces "Here Come the Nice"
The opening chords and verses to "Here Come the Nice", which marked the first time Small Faces released a psychedelic track.

"Here Come the Nice" was eventually released as a single on 2 June 1967; this time "Green Circles" was replaced by "Talk to You". (Note: Catalogue number Immediate IM050.) It was the Small Faces' first single to be released through Immediate Records, which most likely made it susceptible of release; under the stricter Arden, it is likely that the track would not have been issued as a single since it contained subtle drug references, alluding to the incident with their parents; however Andrew Loog Oldham at Immediate had no problems with the song's release. The song features several references to the band's dealer, through lyrics such as "He's got what I need, he's always there if I need some speed". The release of "Here Come the Nice" came to be a tense moment for Small Faces, as the BBC had banned "I Can't Make It" for unknown reasons, which led to a sense of uncertainty regarding the single. (Note: During the 1960s, the BBC banned songs that contained profanity in lyrics, explicit sexual content, alleged drug references, and controversial political subject matter. A similar situation occurred with the Smoke's 1967 single "My Friend Jack" that was banned for its alleged references to LSD.) However, the single managed to bypass the censors, something that Hewitt and Hellier attributed to guilt, while Jones believed it slipped through Mary Whitehouse.

In doing this, "Here Come the Nice" managed to reach the UK Singles Chart, entering on 14 June 1967 at a position of 37; it peaked at number 12 on 11 July. The song spent nine weeks on the chart, six of which it appeared in the top 20. It did better in other pop magazines, including Melody Maker, where it reached number 8, Disc & Music Echo where it reached number 10, which it also did in New Musical Express. In Europe, the single further reached number 24 on the West German Media Control chart and number 28 on the Dutch Top 40 during that same summer. Like all the band's singles prior to "Itchycoo Park" (1967), it did not chart on the US Billboard Hot 100 nor the Cashbox Top 100, although Billboard had predicted for the song to reach the Hot 100. The United States issue of the single was delayed because of issues with distribution along with the American master tape being an alternate take. The single would eventually be released through United Artists Records a month later in July 1967.

"Here Come the Nice" was not included on any of Small Faces' three British studio albums, although the B-side "Talk to You" was released on their second album (also titled Small Faces) about two weeks after the single was released. In the US however, following the huge chart success of "Itchycoo Park", previous singles released in the United Kingdom and some tracks from the album were issued on the North American exclusive album There Are But Four Small Faces on 17 March 1968. In the UK, the song first appeared on an LP when it was included on the soundtrack of Tonite Lets All Make Love in London on 18 July 1968. The film was made by Peter Whitehead, who Small Faces had previously worked with when making promotional films for their 1967 songs "Just Passing", "Itchycoo Park" and their 1968 song "Lazy Sunday". Nonetheless, "Here Come the Nice" became a staple on most compilation albums released by Small Faces, and was included as the opening track of the double album The Autumn Stone in 1969. The song was later utilized as the title track of a Small Faces box set that details their material recorded between 1967 and 1969.

== Critical reception ==
The song was met with mostly positive feedback from music critics, who liked the direction the band took. In the magazine's 3 June 1967 issue, New Musical Express critic Derek Johnson stated that unlike previous singles, it is more subdued with a good melody along with great harmonies, noting the blues influenced sound, while also liking the ending to the song. Chris Hayes from Melody Maker said that the song had a great chance of reaching the top 10, noting McLagan's organ, while simultaneously noticing the band members have retained their personalities, despite a shift in genres. When reviewing singles for Disc & Music Echo, fellow musician Lulu stated that while she initially thought it was a female singing, she liked the innovative ending and called the track a better song than "Patterns", but thought it sounded similar to a track from the Beatles' Sgt. Pepper's Lonely Hearts Club Band (1967). Peter Jones of Record Mirror thought the song has a "[l]ight-edged vocal line", which then builds up to "Marriott bluesily selling over the group backing". He did, however, find the song less commercial than Small Faces' previous records, but thought it has clever lyrics.

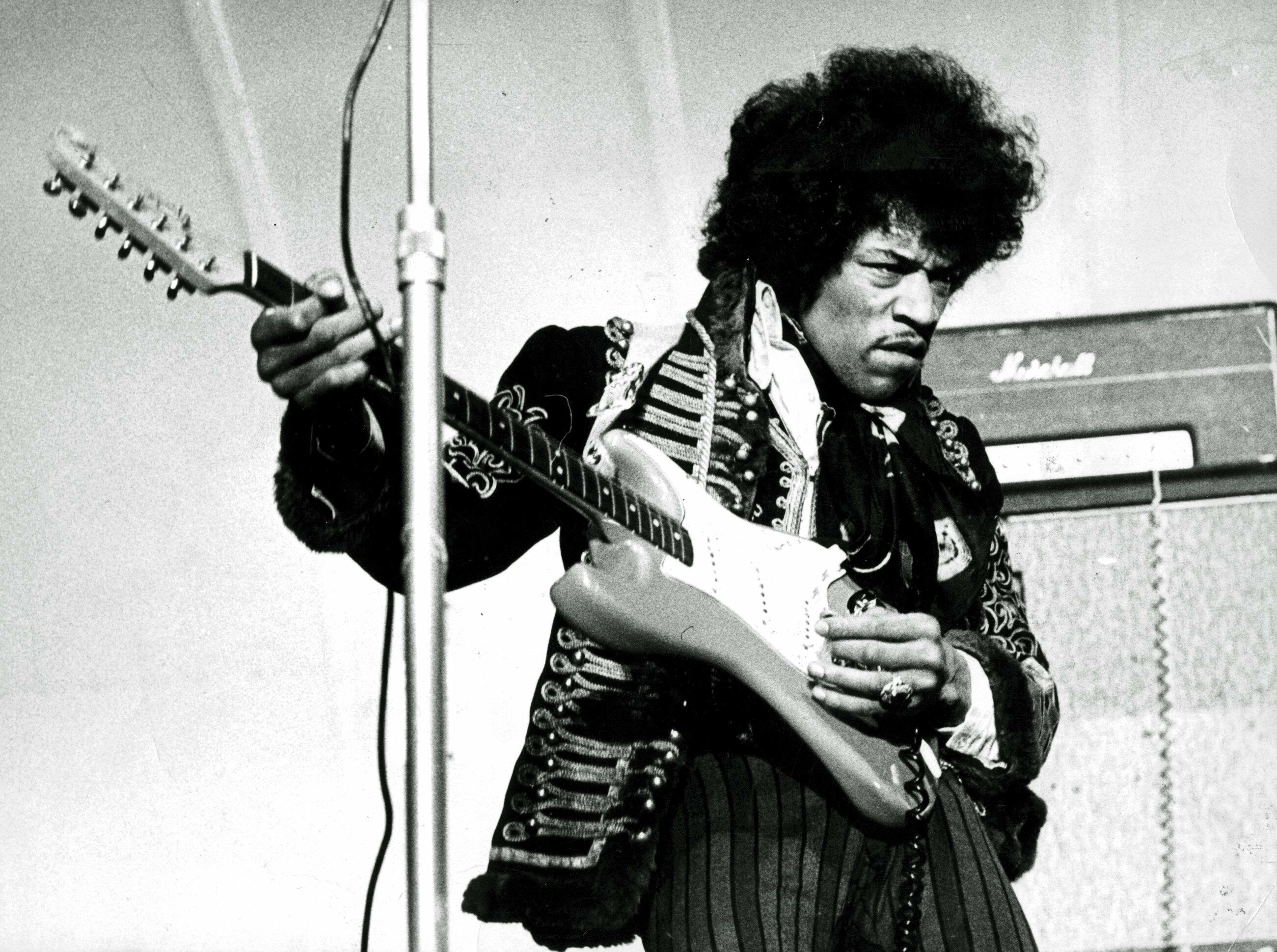
Jimi Hendrix (pictured here in 1967) was a fan of the song.

During a blindfold test for Melody Maker, guitarist Jimi Hendrix heard the song. Despite initially thinking it had a female vocalist, he liked them and realized it was Small Faces. He stated that the drumming, beat and backing vocals were great and spoke of a "Mrs. Miller trick" regarding the tempo. Hendrix considered the song to be a step up from material recorded in 1966, and wanted to write with them, despite being unsure on whether or not the song would be a hit. However, not all reviews of the songs were positive. When Allan Clarke of the Hollies reviewed the single through Disc & Music Echo he negatively noted that Marriott seemed to write the same type of music all the time, and longed for a change in their music. He ended by stating that it was nothing remarkable.

Upon release in the US, the single also garnered primarily positive reviews. Billboard magazine had incorrectly predicted it to reach the Billboard Hot 100, noting the soul influence on the song. In Cash Box magazine it is described as "a tempting tune that could catch sales fire via wide-spread pop spinning". They note the "off-beat" opening chords of the song and states that it transforms into a "mid-tempo song" that features a great group backing while praising Marriott's vocal input. The review ends by stating that "Here Come The Nice" is an "English influence on an r&b song".

== Legacy ==
Retrospectively, Stephen Thomas Erlewine of AllMusic called "Here Come the Nice", along with "Itchycoo Park" and "Tin Soldier", the best singles the band recorded. Lindsay Planer considered the track a "druggy ditty", noting the influences of psychedelic and baroque pop on it. Rolling Stone critic David Fricke called the song a "Motown-like concision". Dave Swanson of Ultimate Classic Rock labelled it "a wonderful little song", noting the nods to drug dealers. He later added it on his list of the top ten songs by them at number seven, stating that it was a "psychedelic yet soulful" song. Small Faces themselves have stated mixed opinions regarding the song. While Jones stated that it was recorded and released during a time period in which their compositions became meaningful, he "bracketed" the song together with "Tin Soldier" due to them having similar arrangements. McLagan thought it was odd that the BBC did not ban it, while stating dismay with the ending, which he called "crap". "Here Come the Nice" might have inspired the naming of Keith Emerson's band the Nice. Upon signing with Immediate, Marriott suggested for the band the Little People to change their name to the Nice, which Oldham turned down, considering it rubbish. Marriott would occasionally also shout "Here Come the Nice" in the presence of Oldham, further adding to the speculation.

Nonetheless, "Here Come the Nice" marked a gap between Small Faces' earlier music, while not fitting in with either category. "Here Come the Nice" can be marked a starting point of Small Faces career as studio musicians, as both practical and unpractical sound effects would become common in almost all later songs Small Faces recorded, most notably "Itchycoo Park", which became one of the first pop records to feature a flanging effect applied to it. According to Jones, the great reception of the single also led Small Faces further into psychedelia, which also would become common on almost all later records. The subtle drug references have led to both the Rich Kids recording "Here Come the Nice" that features Midge Ure and Glen Matlock for the B-side of their single "Marching Men" in 1978, and Noel Gallagher performing the song live with Paul Weller.

== Personnel ==
Personnel according to the liner notes of Here Comes The Nice: Immediate Years box set 1967–69.

- Steve Marriott – lead and backing vocals, acoustic guitar
- Ronnie Lane – bass guitar, backing vocals
- Ian McLagan – piano, hammond organ, backing vocals
- Kenney Jones – drums, percussion

== Charts ==
Chart performance for "Here Comes the Nice"
Chart (1967)	Peak position
Netherlands (Dutch Top 40)	28
Malaysia (Radio Televisyen Malaysia)	9
UK Disc & Music Echo Top 30	10
UK Melody Maker Pop 30	8
UK New Musical Express Top 30	10
UK Record Retailer	12
West German Media Control Singles Chart	24

== See also ==
- Small Faces discography
- Songs about illegal drug use

== Sources ==
- Hewitt, Paulo; Hellier, John (2004). Steve Marriott: All Too Beautiful... Helter Skelter. ISBN 1-900924-44-7.
- Schmitt, Roland; Twelker, Uli (2011). The Small Faces & Other Stories. Bobcat Books. ISBN 978-0-85712-451-7.
- Hewitt, Paolo (1995). Small Faces: The Young Mods' Forgotten Story. Acid Jazz. ISBN 0-952393-50-6.
- MacLeod, Sean (2015). Leaders of the Pack: Girl Groups of the 1960s and Their Influence on Popular Culture in Britain and America. Rowman & Littlefield. ISBN 978-1442252028.
- Roberts, David (2006). British Hit Singles & Albums. Guinness World Records. ISBN 1904994105.
- Neill, Andy (2011). Had Me a Real Good Time: The Faces Before During and After. Omnibus Press. ISBN 978-1783236190.
- Du Noyer, Paul (2009). In the City: A Celebration of London Music. Random House. ISBN 978-0753520956.
- Jones, Kenney (2018). Let the Good Times Roll: My Life in Small Faces, Faces, and The Who. St. Martin's Press. ISBN 978-1250193575.
- McLagan, Ian (2011). All the Rage: My High Life with the Small Faces, the Faces, the Rolling Stones and Many More. Pan Books. ISBN 978-0615491707.
- Muise, Dan (2002). Gallagher, Marriott, Derringer & Trower: Their Lives and Music. Hal Leonard Corporation. ISBN 0634029568.
- Jones, Mark (2016). The Immediate Discography: The First 20 Years. Lulu.com. ISBN 978-1909953574.
- Hodgson, Jay (2010). Understanding Records: A Field Guide To Recording Practice. Bloomsbury Publishing. ISBN 9781441124098.
