= London '66–'67 =

London '66 - '67

Live album / EP by Pink Floyd
- Released: 29 September 1994 (VHS); 20 November 1995 (EP)
- Recorded: 11–12 January 1967
- Studio: Sound Techniques Studios
- Genres: Psychedelic rock; space rock; jazz fusion; instrumental rock
- Length: 28:30
- Labels: See for Miles, Kscope
- Producer: Joe Boyd

Pink Floyd chronology
Pulse (1995)	London '66 - '67 (1994)	1967: The First Three Singles (1997)

Professional ratings
Review scores
Source	Rating
Allmusic	2.5/5 stars
The Encyclopedia of Popular Music	3/5 stars

London '66–'67 is an EP and film of Pink Floyd music created as promotional trailer for Tonite Let's All Make Love in London, containing two "lost" tracks—an extended version of "Interstellar Overdrive" and a previously unreleased track "Nick's Boogie" released as VHS on September 29, 1994. These tracks were originally recorded for Peter Whitehead's film Tonite Let's All Make Love in London in 1967, and the former appeared in edited form on the soundtrack album. Originally released in full on the 1990 See for Miles Records UK reissue of the soundtrack album, they were the earliest Pink Floyd recordings available commercially before the limited release of 1965: Their First Recordings in 2015.

The EP was originally issued in 1995, then reissued by Snapper Music (SMACD924X, 2005) on 13 September 2005, as a remastered CD and a DVD featuring the entire film plus excerpts from the original movie. The EP is considered an early example of the jazz fusion genre, incorporating jazz-influenced improvisation to their psychedelic compositions.

== Track listing ==
No.	Title	Writer(s)	Length
1.	"Interstellar Overdrive"	Syd Barrett, Nick Mason, Roger Waters, Richard Wright	16:46
2.	"Nick's Boogie"	Mason	11:55
Total length:			28:41

== DVD ==
- London '66–'67, the original film with the full length video of "Interstellar Overdrive" and "Nick's Boogie".
- Interview footage from the 1960s of Mick Jagger, David Hockney, Michael Caine and Julie Christie.
- Footage capturing the London Scene in the late sixties.
- Overview by director Peter Whitehead.

== Personnel ==
Pink Floyd

- Syd Barrett – electric guitar
- Roger Waters – bass guitar
- Richard Wright – Farfisa organ
- Nick Mason – drums, percussion

Production

- Joe Boyd – production
- John Wood – engineering

== Certifications ==
Region	Certification	Certified units/sales
Canada (Music Canada)	Platinum	10,000^{^}
^{^} Shipments figures based on certification alone.
