= UFO Club =

Former club in London, England

Coordinates: 51.518354°N 0.132073°W

UFOria

The UFO Club (short for Unlimited Freak Out) (/juːfoʊ/ YEW-foh) was a short-lived British counter-culture nightclub in London in the 1960s. The club was established by Joe Boyd and John "Hoppy" Hopkins in 1966. It featured light shows, poetry readings, well-known rock acts such as Jimi Hendrix, avant-garde art by Yoko Ono, as well as local house bands, such as Pink Floyd and Soft Machine. The club operated for seven months from 23 December 1966 to 28 July 1967 at 31 Tottenham Court Road in Fitzrovia, followed by a further two months at the Roundhouse in Chalk Farm with the final show taking place on 29 September.

== History ==
The UFO Club was founded by John Hopkins known as "Hoppy" and Joe Boyd in the Blarney Club, an Irish dancehall in the basement of 31 Tottenham Court Road, under the Gala Berkeley Cinema which was opened on Friday 23 December 1966. Initially the club was advertised as "UFO Presents Nite Tripper", because Boyd and Hopkins could not decide on "UFO" or "Nite Tripper" as a name. Eventually they settled on "UFO".

Soft Machine and Pink Floyd performed on the opening night and the next Friday, and were re-engaged as the club continued into 1967, after initial success. The first events combined live music with light shows, avant-garde films and slide shows, and dance troupes.

Pink Floyd's tenure at UFO was short, because as their fame grew, they were able to play bigger venues for higher fees. Boyd protested that their increasing fame was largely due to the success of UFO, but the band's management wanted to move on and an agreement was made for just three more Floyd performances at UFO, at an increased fee.

Hopkins and Boyd had to cast around for a new "house band" for UFO. They settled on Soft Machine but also started booking other acts who were attracted by the club's reputation. Amongst them were The Incredible String Band, Arthur Brown, Tomorrow, and Procol Harum, the latter of which played there when "A Whiter Shade of Pale" was No 1 in the charts.

Were All Doomed!!!

An advertisement featuring the Flammarion engraving in the 13–26 Feb issue of The International Times for "UfOria! Festival of Love 10.30 till dawn" [sic] announced "feb.10 – the bonzo dog doodah band • flix–dali–bunuel • ginger johnson african drums" as well as "feb 17 – Soft Machine • mark boyle projections • movies • food • erogenius 3 + 4".

Hapshash and the Coloured Coat, consisting of Michael English and Nigel Waymouth, designed psychedelic posters to advertise events. Waymouth said, "We were trying to give a visual concept of what we were experiencing, which was like hallucinations." The food was macrobiotic and included brown rice rissoles, vegetarian stuffed vine leaves and felafel, supplied by Craig Sams, who went on to co-found Whole Earth Foods and Green & Black's.

Jack Bracelin's (Fiveacres Lights) created some of the light shows with equipment that ranged from 16mm projection of early "art house" films (often projected sideways or projected into smoke) or 5 kW 'Panis' (effects projectors) borrowed from Samuelsons at Pinewood or Elstree film studios (or Strand Electric at Vauxhall) to overhead projectors with transparent trays borrowed from refrigerators and filled with Indian water, ink, beer etc. A common way was to use 'Aldis' slide projectors with dual layer 2×2 glass specimen slides with basic designs created with wax crayons (drawn by Lou – the oft naked lady) and then various substances introduced with syringes – Indian inks, snot, semen – in fact anything of immiscible viscosities. Bubbles made by injecting air between the glass plates which were then squeezed (by a pair of long nose pliers – in time to the music) would send folks even further off their heads!

After a sordid article published in the News of the World on 30 July, the landlord told Joe Boyd the UFO could not continue at the Blarney. Brian Epstein offered the Champagne Lounge at his Saville Theatre but Boyd decided on the larger Roundhouse venue. In October 1967 the UFO Club at the Roundhouse folded.

The UFO Club's success was its downfall – being too small to accommodate the increasing number of visitors. If a big name such as Jeff Beck was playing, UFO broke even, but the club usually lost money.

== Billings ==
=== Blarney Club ===
- 23/30 Dec: Pink Floyd; Soft Machine; Nite Tripper under Gala Berkeley Cinema; Warhol movies; Anger movies; Heating warm; IT god
- 13 Jan: Pink Floyd; Marilyn Monroe movie; The Sun Trolley; Technicolor strobe; Fiveacre slides; Karate
- 20 Jan: Pink Floyd; Anger movie
- 27 Jan: AMM Music; Pink Floyd; Five Acre Light; Flight of the Aerogenius Chpt 1; International Times; IT Girl Beauty Contest
- 3 Feb: Soft Machine; Brown's Poetry; Flight of the Aerogenius Chpt 2; Bruce Connor Movies
- 10 Feb: Bonzo Dog Doo Dah Band; Ginger Johnson African Drums; flix – Dali – Bunuel, WC Fields
- 17 Feb: Soft Machine; Indian Music; Disney Cartoons; Mark Boyle Projections; Feature Movie; 'erogenius 3 + 4'
- 24 Feb: Pink Floyd; Brothers Grimm
- 3 Mar: Soft Machine; Pink Floyd
- 10 Mar: Pink Floyd
- 17 Mar: St Patrick's day off
- 24 Mar: Soft Machine
- 31 Mar: The Crazy World of Arthur Brown; Pink Alberts; 'spot the fuzz contest'
- 7 Apr: Soft Machine
- 14 Apr: The Crazy World of Arthur Brown; Social Deviants; Special: the fuzz
- 21 Apr: Pink Floyd
- 28 Apr: Tomorrow; The Smoke; The Purple Gang
- (29/30 Apr: The 14 Hour Technicolor Dream at the Alexandra Palace)
- 5 May: Soft Machine; The Crazy World of Arthur Brown
- 12 May: The Graham Bond Organisation; Procol Harum
- 19 May: Tomorrow; The Crazy World of Arthur Brown; The People Show
- 26 May: The Move, The Knack
- 2 Jun: Pink Floyd; Soft Machine; The Tales of Ollin dance group; Hydrogen Jukebox
- 9 Jun: Procol Harum; The Smoke
- 10 Jun: Pink Floyd
- 16 Jun: The Crazy World of Arthur Brown; Soft Machine; The People Blues Band 4.30am
- 23 Jun: Liverpool Love Festival; The Trip
- 30 Jun: Tomorrow; The Knack; Dead Sea Fruit
- 7 Jul: Denny Laine; The Pretty Things
- 14 Jul: The Crazy World of Arthur Brown; Alexis Korner; Victor Brox
- 21 Jul: Tomorrow; Bonzo Dog Doo Dah Band
- 28 Jul: Pink Floyd; CIA v UFO; Fairport Convention; Shiva's Children

=== Roundhouse ===
- 4 Aug: Eric Burdon & The New Animals; Family; The Hydrogen Juke Box
- 11 Aug: Tomorrow
- 18 Aug: The Crazy World of Arthur Brown; The Incredible String Band
- 1/2 Sep: UFO Festival: Pink Floyd; Soft Machine; The Move; The Crazy World of Arthur Brown; Tomorrow; Denny Laine
- 8 Sep: Eric Burdon & The New Animals; Aynsley Dunbar
- 15 Sep: Soft Machine; Family
- 22 Sep: Dantalian's Chariot w/ Zoot Money & His Light Show; The Social Deviants; The Exploding Galaxy
- 29 Sep: Jeff Beck; Ten Years After; Mark Boyle's New Sensual Laboratory; Contessa Veronica
