= Some Things Just Stick in Your Mind – Singles and Demos 1964 to 1967 =

2007 compilation album by Vashti Bunyan

Some Things Just Stick in Your Mind - Singles and Demos 1964 to 1967

Compilation album by Vashti Bunyan
- Released: 19 October 2007
- Recorded: 1964–1967
- Genre: Pop, folk, baroque pop
- Label: FatCat FATCD59

Vashti Bunyan chronology
Lookaftering (2005)	Some Things Just Stick in Your Mind - Singles and Demos 1964 to 1967 (2007)	Heartleap (2014)

Singles from Some Things Just Stick in Your Mind - Singles and Demos 1964 to 1967
- 1. "Some Things Just Stick in Your Mind" Released: 18 February 2008, 7FAT30

Professional ratings
Review scores
Source	Rating
AllMusic	3.5/5 stars
Pitchfork	(6.5/10)
Q	3/5 stars

Some Things Just Stick in Your Mind – Singles and Demos 1964 to 1967 is a compilation album by Vashti Bunyan collecting her mid-sixties singles cuts (including the Jagger–Richards penned title track) with unreleased demos recorded at the time. Disc two features her recently rediscovered first studio demo session from 1964 in its entirety. A special limited-edition version adds four bonus tracks (numbers 14-17) to disc one.

The album was released in the USA by DiChristina.

== Track listing ==
Except where noted, all tracks are written by Vashti Bunyan.

Disc 1
No.	Title	Writer(s)	Length
1.	"Some Things Just Stick in Your Mind"	Jagger–Richards	2:18
2.	"I Want To Be Alone"		2:51
3.	"Train Song"	Bunyan; Alasdair Clayre	2:15
4.	"Love Song"		1:59
5.	"Winter Is Blue"		2:55
6.	"Coldest Night Of The Year"	Barry Mann; Cynthia Weil	3:28
7.	"I'd Like To Walk Around In Your Mind"		2:15
8.	"Winter Is Blue"		1:48
9.	"Girl's Song In Winter"	Bunyan; Clayre	1:37
10.	"If In Winter (100 Lovers)"	Bunyan; Clayre	1:47
11.	"Wishwanderer"		1:56
12.	"Don't Believe"		1:37
13.	"17 Pink Sugar Elephants"	Bunyan; Jenny Lewis	1:51

Limited edition CD
No.	Title	Writer(s)	Length
14.	"I Won't Say"		2:24
15.	"Girl's Song In Winter (Alt. Version)"	Clayre	3:25
16.	"If In Winter (100 Lovers) (Alt. Version)"	Bunyan; Clayre	1:13
17.	"I'd Like To Walk Around In Your Mind (Alt. Version)"		2:22

Disc 2
No.	Title	Writer(s)	Length
1.	"Autumn Leaves"		1:57
2.	"Leave Me"		2:24
3.	"If In Winter (100 Lovers)"	Bunyan; Clayre	1:19
4.	"How Do I Know"		2:00
5.	"Find My Heart Again"		1:59
6.	"Go Before Dawn"		1:54
7.	"Girl's Song In Winter"	Bunyan; Clayre	1:38
8.	"I Don't Know What Love Is"		1:48
9.	"Don't Believe What They Say"		2:12
10.	"Love You Now"		2:10
11.	"I Know"	Tony Maude	1:34
12.	"Someday"		2:05
Total length:			61:01

== Editions ==
Region	Date	Label	Format	Catalog
UK	19 October 2007	FatCat	CD	FATCD59
UK	19 October 2007	FatCat	CD (bonus tracks)	FATCD59LTD
UK	19 October 2007	FatCat	double vinyl album	FATLP59
United States	5 November 2007	DiChristina	CD	STEP11
United States	19 November 2007	DiChristina	double vinyl album	STEP11LP
