= Interstellar Overdrive =

- B-side label of the French Arnold Layne EP, featuring an edit of "Interstellar Overdrive"

Instrumental by Pink Floyd

from the album The Piper at the Gates of Dawn
- Released: 4 August 1967
- Recorded: 16 March 1967
- Genre: Space rock; psychedelic rock; experimental rock; proto-prog; free improvisation
- Length: 9:41 (album version); 14:57 (1966 recording, used in 1968 film San Francisco); 16:49 (London '66-'67 version); 3:02 (Tonite Lets All Make Love in London version)
- Label: EMI Columbia; Tower
- Composers: Syd Barrett; Roger Waters; Richard Wright; Nick Mason
- Producer: Norman Smith

"Interstellar Overdrive" is an instrumental composition written and performed by the English rock band Pink Floyd. The song was written in 1966 and is on their 1967 debut album, The Piper at the Gates of Dawn, clocking in at almost ten minutes in length. It features long sections of free-form instrumental improvisation reflective of the group's live performances.

The song originated when guitarist Syd Barrett heard the band's manager Peter Jenner humming a song, which Barrett tried to interpret by playing it on his guitar. Sharing the same emphasis on chromaticism with "Astronomy Domine", the piece was recorded in several takes during March and April 1967. An earlier, longer recording of the song made in January 1967 is available on the EP London '66–'67, a sample of which can be heard on the soundtrack to the film Tonite Let's All Make Love in London, which was recorded at Sound Techniques studios in early 1967 and was released in the same year. An even earlier version was made in October 1966 and can be heard in the 1968 film San Francisco. Other versions of the track appear on various bootleg recordings. The piece has been covered by acts such as Tyrannosaurus Rex (jammed on bass by Steve Peregrin Took live in 1969), Pearl Jam, Camper Van Beethoven, Hawkwind, the Melvins, moe., and Simon House.

== Composition and music ==
"Interstellar Overdrive" was one of the first psychedelic instrumental improvisations recorded by a rock band. It was seen as Pink Floyd's first foray into space rock (along with "Astronomy Domine"), although band members would later disparage this term. It has been described as an experimental rock, psychedelic rock, and free improvisation piece, as well as an example of proto-prog. "Interstellar Overdrive" originated when early Pink Floyd manager Peter Jenner was trying to hum a song he could not remember the name of (most commonly identified as Love's cover of "My Little Red Book"). Guitarist and vocalist Syd Barrett followed Jenner's humming with his guitar and used it as the basis for the principal melody of "Interstellar Overdrive". Bassist Roger Waters once told Barrett that the song's riff reminded him of the theme tune from Steptoe and Son (by Ron Grainer). Around the time the song was written, Barrett was inspired by AMM and their guitarist Keith Rowe, who had a pattern of moving pieces of metal along his guitar's fretboard. The free-form section (and also, "Pow R. Toc H.") was inspired by Frank Zappa's free-form Freak Out! and The Byrds' "Eight Miles High".

The song's main theme descends chromatically from B to G, before resolving to E, all chords major. The opening hook of the piece is a distorted, descending guitar riff, played by Barrett, its composer, with Waters on bass and Richard Wright on organ. Nick Mason's drums then kick in, and after the riff repeats itself a bit, the track turns into improvisation, including modal improvisations, flourishes on the Farfisa organ, and quiet interludes. The song gradually becomes almost structureless and in free-form tempo, punctuated only by strange guitar noises. Eventually, however, the entire band restates the main theme, which is repeated with decreasing tempo and more deliberate intensity. In the stereo version, the sound in this section repeatedly pans rapidly back and forth from left to right. Waters once called the song "an abstract piece". A bass riff in the song later evolved into another Pink Floyd song, "Let There Be More Light", which was written by Waters.

== Recording ==
The stereo version of the song has an organ moving from speaker to speaker; the effect is lost on the mono version of the song, where it simply gains an extra organ and guitar sound. However, the organ is very prominent during the first 50 seconds of the mono version—along with some special effects—but inaudible in the stereo mix until the improvised section. Five takes of the song were originally recorded on 27 February 1967, with a sixth later recorded on 16 March 1967, in an attempt to create a shorter version, with overdubs in June of that year. The Piper version also appears on the official compilation albums Relics (Note: UK Starline SRS 5071/EMI IE 048 o 04775) (Note: US Harvest SW-759) and A Nice Pair. (Note: UK Harvest SHDW 403) (Note: US Harvest SABB-11257) Although producer Norman Smith tried to reduce the album's other tracks from a jam-long length to something more manageable, he relented for "Interstellar Overdrive", as Jenner recalled: "It was definitely the deal that—hey, here you can do 'Interstellar Overdrive', you can do what you like, you can do your weird shit. So 'Interstellar Overdrive' was the weird shit . . . and again, hats off to Norman for letting them do that." Smith created a delay effect by superimposing a second version of the song over a previous version, and played the drum roll on the song near the very end.

== Alternative versions and live performances ==
The studio recording on The Piper at the Gates of Dawn is the one that most listeners are familiar with, yet several other versions survive from both the recording studio and the stage. It was first recorded as a demo on 31 October 1966, recorded live-in-studio at Thompson Private Recording Company. This version was used as the audio sound to the film San Francisco, which was made by a friend of Barrett's, Anthony Stern. While filmmaker Peter Whitehead and his secondhand Stern were having a discussion, the topic about Pink Floyd was brought about by Stern, to which Whitehead told him, "yeah, terrible music". Stern said that "they're successful now", and suggest the pair go watch Pink Floyd, at their gig at the Royal College of Art. Whitehead recalled that they "went to UFO and I liked them. Not connected to pop music, a long improvisatory quality, ideal for what I wanted." Whitehead convinced Pink Floyd to record "Interstellar Overdrive" for a film he was working on. Before turning up at the recording studio, the band held a rehearsal, and the next day, 11 January 1967, went to Sound Techniques studios. The studio, which was originally a dairy factory, was run by engineers Geoff Frost and John Wood.

For the session, which was booked for two hours, Wood and Joe Boyd operated the mixing desk, while Whitehead and Stern were filming. This recording of the song lasted nearly 16-minutes in length, recorded onto a 4-track recorder in one take, as the band didn't want to have to play through the song again. The band then played another original instrumental, titled "Nick's Boogie". While 5 seconds of the band playing was included in Whitehead's Tonite Let's All Make Love in London film, edits of the recording was included on the film's respective soundtrack. The soundtrack (released in 1968) (Note: UK Instant INLP 002) includes an edited version of the song and two reprises of it. The full version is available on the album London '66–'67. (Note: UK See for Miles SFMDP 3) While attempting to get the band a record deal, Boyd returned with the group to Sound Techniques studios. There, Boyd and the band recorded a demo tape which was to be given to various record labels, one of the songs that features on the tape was "Interstellar Overdrive". An early, unoverdubbed, shortened mix of the album's "Interstellar Overdrive" was used for a French EP released in July 1967. (Note: France EMI Columbia ESRF 1857) The 40th anniversary edition of The Piper at the Gates of Dawn (Note: Two CDs: Europe EMI 503 9232; three CDs: Europe EMI 50999 5 03919 2 9) contains two different, five-minute-long versions of the song, one of them being take 6 from 16 March.

Despite its encapsulation of their concert repertoire under the leadership of guitarist and composer Barrett, the long, improvisational, freeform structure of the piece is not particularly representative of the group's recorded output. As drummer Mason states in his book Inside Out: A Personal History of Pink Floyd, live versions of the song featured many sections that did not appear on the album, and would often last more than 20 minutes. During the band's days playing in residence at London underground clubs such as the UFO (Underground Freak Out), the song usually opened their show. It occupied other positions, including the encore, until it was retired from the band's setlist in 1970. The song had first appeared in live performances in the autumn of 1966. During one performance of the song, at a gig organized by Hoppy Hopkins, Pink Floyd managed to blow out the power of a venue. Hopkins called it "Very cold, very dirty but very nice." After recording session for Piper were over, Pink Floyd played a 30-minute version of "Interstellar Overdrive". Pink Floyd were filmed performing the song for Granada Television's Scene Special Documentary, in January 1967 at the UFO Club. A late-Barrett era rendition was recorded live in Rotterdam in November 1967, at the Hippy-Happy Fair. The song was later replaced by "Set the Controls for the Heart of the Sun" as the main part of the band's set lists, after Barrett left the band. It continued to be performed as an encore, with the last documented appearance in Montreux on 22 November 1970. A version of "Interstellar Overdrive" was cut from the Ummagumma live album. The song was played by Nick Mason's Saucerful of Secrets in 2018.

In 1969, Frank Zappa joined the band onstage at the Actuel Festival in Amougies, Belgium, to perform a long loose version of the song. Although Zappa himself later had no recollection of the performance, Floyd drummer Mason praised him, saying, "Zappa is really one of those rare musicians that can play with us. The little he did in Amougies was terribly correct."

== Covers and legacy ==
"Interstellar Overdrive" has been covered by many artists, including Teenage Fanclub and Kylesa.

- The Melvins made a cover of Interstellar Overdrive in 1996. It was released as a 10" vinyl disk by Man's Ruin Records. The same recording was later included on their 2001 album Electroretard.
- Camper Van Beethoven covered the song on their studio album Camper Van Beethoven.
- Nick Mason's Saucerful of Secrets included it in their repertoire of early Floyd material. "What I don't want to do is slavishly copy what we did on the album," Mason noted. "The great thing with 'Interstellar' is that it's a piece that lends itself to improvisation. What I'd like to do is capture some of the weirdness – some of the very specific things that Syd did – but actually bring a bit of our own language into it." A recording is included on their 2020 live album Live at the Roundhouse.
- The album version was ranked number 36 on Rolling Stone magazine's list of the 100 greatest guitar songs of all time.
- The song featured on Pink Floyd's compilation Relics, and was considered for—but ultimately left off—their career-spanning retrospective Echoes: The Best of Pink Floyd.
- Hip-hop group Death Grips sampled the song in 2011 for the song 'I Want I Need It (Death Heated)' on their debut mixtape Exmilitary.
- The song was used in the 2016 film Doctor Strange.

== Personnel ==
Personnel per The Piper at the Gates of Dawn liner notes.

- Syd Barrett – guitar
- Roger Waters – bass guitar
- Rick Wright – Farfisa organ
- Nick Mason – drums

with:

- Norman Smith – drum roll
