= Tonite Let's All Make Love in London (film) =

1967 "Swinging London" music and interview documentary by Peter Whitehead

- Directed by: Peter Whitehead
- Written by: Peter Whitehead
- Produced by: Peter Whitehead
- Starring: Michael Caine; Edna O'Brien; Vanessa Redgrave; Andrew Loog Oldham; Mick Jagger; Julie Christie; Alan Aldridge; David Hockney; Victor Lownes; Lee Marvin; Allen Ginsberg
- Cinematography: Peter Whitehead
- Edited by: Peter Whitehead
- Music by: Pink Floyd; Marquis of Kensington; Twice as Much; Chris Farlowe; Eric Burdon and The Animals; Vashti; Rolling Stones; Small Faces
- Production company: Lorrimer Films
- Release date: 26 September 1967
- Running time: 72 minutes
- Country: United Kingdom

Tonite Let's All Make Love in London is a 1967 British documentary film directed, written and produced by Peter Whitehead. It includes sequences of "Swinging London" with accompanying contemporary pop music, concert and studio performances by musicians including the Rolling Stones and the first professional footage filmed of Pink Floyd, and several interviews. It is notable for showing footage shot inside the short-lived UFO Club, the British counter-culture night club in the basement of 31 Tottenham Court Road, and at The 14 Hour Technicolor Dream multi-artist event held in the Great Hall of the Alexandra Palace, including John Lennon. The film also shows scenes of soldiers parading in scarlet jackets and bearskins, London street scenes, a protest march, psychedelic patterns being painted on a semi-naked girl, the arrival of Playboy Bunny girls by plane, and guests including Roman Polanski and Sharon Tate, Terence Stamp, and Jim Brown arriving at the premiere of Polanski's film Cul-de-sac (1966).

The film has been described as "what for many critics was the definitive document of swinging London, a white-hot crucible of music, fashion and film."

The title is taken from a line in Allen Ginsberg's poem "Who Be Kind To".

== Synopsis ==
The film self-describes as a "Pop Concerto for Film" and is divided into seven themed sections or "movements" with a prelude and a coda.

Pink Floyd – "Interstellar Overdrive"

1. Loss of the British Empire

- Marquis of Kensington – "The Changing of the Guard"
- Michael Caine interview (part 1)

2. Dollygirls

- Twice as Much – "Night Time Girl"
- "Dolly Girl" interviews
- Chris Farlowe – "Out of Time"
- Edna O'Brien interview

3. Protest

- Vanessa Redgrave – "Guantanamera"
- Eric Burdon and The Animals – "When I Was Young"

4. It's All Pop Music

- Pink Floyd – "Interstellar Overdrive" (reprise 1)
- Andrew Loog Oldham interview (part 1)
- Vashti – "Winter Is Blue"
- Andrew Loog Oldham interview (part 2)
- Vashti – "Winter Is Blue" (reprise)
- Rolling Stones – "Have You Seen Your Mother, Baby, Standing in the Shadow?"
- Mick Jagger interview
- Rolling Stones – "Lady Jane"

5. Movie Stars

- Julie Christie interview
- Michael Caine interview (part 2)

6. Painting Pop

- Chris Farlowe – "Paint It Black"
- Alan Aldridge interview
- David Hockney interview

7. As Scene from U.S.A.

- The Small Faces – "Here Come the Nice"
- Victor Lownes interview
- Lee Marvin interview

- Pink Floyd – "Interstellar Overdrive" (reprise 2)
- Allen Ginsberg – "Tonite Let's All Make Love in London"
- Pink Floyd – "Interstellar Overdrive" (reprise 3)

== Reception ==
The Monthly Film Bulletin wrote: "Peter Whitehead's fragmented look at the "swinging" London ... is in some ways a fascinating document of contemporary mores. But as a film in its own right, it is confused, imitative and finally self-destructive."

Variety wrote: "Subtitle for this film is "Pop Concerto for Film," and that's as good a description as any of its form and content, since it's not a documentary in any ordinary sense but rather an impressionistic view of "the land of mod" as seen by a sympathetic participant, Overture and postlude for the concerto is montage, jazzily shot, edited and scored, and in-between are seven 'movements' covering such aspects of swinging Britain as pop music and painting, political protest and love (or the local equivalent). ... Some, of course, will see it as a sociological document, heralding the fact that (as Allen Ginsberg says, voice over, in the postlude) 'a new kind of man has come to his bliss.' More likely it's what one of the pop painters refers to as 'absolute ephemera.' But either way it's a good show."

The film was shown at the 1967 New York Film Festival, where The Daily Telegraph reported it was the "hit of the festival".

Kim Newman described the film in Empire magazine as "An interesting and amusing documentary that captures the icons of the time in candid interviews and performances from the biggest bands around."

On review aggregator Rotten Tomatoes, the film holds an approval rating of 83% based on 6 reviews.

== Soundtrack album ==
A soundtrack album with the same title was released on LP in 1968.

== Sources ==
- "Tonite Let's All Make Love in London (1967)". BFI Screenonline. British Film Institute. Archived from the original on 2 August 2016.
- Glynn, Stephen (2013). The British Pop Music Film: The Beatles and Beyond. Palgrave Macmillan. ISBN 9780230392243.
- Genzlinger, Neil (19 June 2019). "Peter Whitehead, 82, Swinging-'60s Filmmaker, Is Dead". The New York Times.
