= Heartleap =

2014 studio album by Vashti Bunyan

Studio album by Vashti Bunyan
- Released: 6 October 2014
- Recorded: 2007–2014
- Genres: Psychedelic folk, freak folk
- Length: 34:42
- Label: FatCat
- Producer: Vashti Bunyan

Vashti Bunyan chronology
Some Things Just Stick in Your Mind – Singles and Demos 1964 to 1967 (2007)	Heartleap (2014)

Heartleap is the third studio album by English singer-songwriter Vashti Bunyan, released on October 6, 2014, in the UK on FatCat Records and October 7 in the U.S. via DiCristina. First announced in June, Heartleap was accompanied by a statement where Bunyan wrote, "The whole point of the album was finally to learn a way that would enable me to record the music that is in my head, by myself. I neither read nor write music, nor can I play piano with more than one hand at a time, but I have loved being able to work it all out for myself and make it sound the way I wanted. I've built these songs over years. The album wouldn't have happened any other way."

== Reception ==
Professional ratings
Aggregate scores
Source	Rating
AnyDecentMusic?	7.8/10
Metacritic	82/100
Review scores
Source	Rating
AllMusic	4/5 stars
Clash	7/10
The Guardian	3/5 stars
The Line of Best Fit	8.5/10
Mojo	4/5 stars
MusicOMH	4/5 stars
Pitchfork	7.8/10
PopMatters	7/10
Q	4/5 stars
Record Collector	4/5 stars

According to the review aggregator Metacritic, Heartleap received "universal acclaim" based on a weighted average score of 82 out of 100 from 17 critic scores.

== Track listing ==
All songs written, arranged and produced by Vashti Bunyan, except arrangement of strings in "Across the Water", improvised by Fiona Brice and Ian Burdge.

No.	Title	Length
1.	"Across the Water"	3:48
2.	"Holy Smoke"	4:48
3.	"Mother"	3:30
4.	"Jellyfish"	3:42
5.	"Shell"	4:08
6.	"The Boy"	1:40
7.	"Gunpowder"	3:04
8.	"Blue Shed"	2:11
9.	"Here"	3:18
10.	"Heartleap"	4:39

== Personnel ==
- Vashti Bunyan - Guitars, synth, producer, vocals, arrangements, piano, dulcitone
- Martin Korth - Mixing
- Mandy Parnell - Mastering
- Whyn Lewis - Cover painting
- dlt - Design and layout
- Fiona Brice - Strings, violin
- Ian Burdge - Strings, cello
- Gillon Cameron - Strings, violin
- Jo Mango - Kalimba, flute
- Gareth Dickson - Guitars
- Andy Cabic - Guitars, vocals
- Devendra Banhart - Vocals
- Ian Wilson - Recorder, saxophone
