= Lookaftering =

2005 studio album by Vashti Bunyan

Studio album by Vashti Bunyan
- Released: October 17, 2005
- Studio: Sound Cafe, Nine Mile Burn; Cava, Glasgow; Eastcore Studios, London
- Genre: Folk, psychedelic folk
- Length: 35:31
- Label: FatCat
- Producer: Max Richter

Vashti Bunyan chronology
Just Another Diamond Day (1970)	Lookaftering (2005)	Some Things Just Stick in Your Mind – Singles and Demos 1964 to 1967 (2007)

Lookaftering is the second studio album by Vashti Bunyan. It was released via FatCat Records on October 17, 2005. It is the follow-up to 1970's Just Another Diamond Day. Tentatively named Dead Pets, Bunyan changed the album's title to Lookaftering, a word used in her family meaning "to care for someone or something."

== Reception ==
Professional ratings
Aggregate scores
Source	Rating
Metacritic	85/100
Review scores
Source	Rating
AllMusic	4/5 stars
Entertainment Weekly	C+
The Guardian	4/5 stars
Mojo	4/5 stars
Pitchfork	8.5/10
PopMatters	8/10
Q	4/5 stars
Stylus Magazine	B+
Tiny Mix Tapes	5/5 stars
Uncut	10/10

At Metacritic, which assigns a weighted average score out of 100 to reviews from mainstream critics, Lookaftering received an average score of 85% based on 21 reviews, indicating "universal acclaim".

Thom Jurek of AllMusic gave the album 4 stars out of 5, calling it "a gorgeously considered, stunningly and sensitively crafted album by an artist who is truly outside of all fashion, all time, and even space." He added, "Without the technological trappings, this album, timeless and spaceless as it is, could have been made 300 years ago, but that it was made in the 21st century blesses you even more."

Pitchfork placed it at number 44 on its list of the "Top 50 Albums of 2005". PopMatters placed it at number 50 on its list of the "Best 50 Albums of 2005".

== Track listing ==
All tracks are written by Vashti Bunyan.

No.	Title	Length
1.	"Lately"	2:21
2.	"Here Before"	2:05
3.	"Wayward"	3:06
4.	"Hidden"	3:20
5.	"Against the Sky"	3:10
6.	"Turning Backs"	4:28
7.	"If I Were"	2:15
8.	"Same but Different"	3:38
9.	"Brother"	2:10
10.	"Feet of Clay"	4:29
11.	"Wayward Hum"	4:26
Total length:		35:31

== Personnel ==
- Vashti Bunyan – acoustic guitar, vocals
- Max Richter – piano, glockenspiel, Hammond organ, Mellotron, vibraphone, Fender Rhodes, wineglasses
- Kevin Barker – electric guitar
- Devendra Banhart – acoustic guitar
- Marcelo DeOliviera – acoustic guitar
- Rebecca Wood – oboe, cor anglais
- Robert Kirby – French horn, trumpet
- Joanna Newsom – harp
- Adam Pierce – dulcimer
- Adem – harmonium, autoharp
- Fiona Brice – strings
- Ian Burdge – strings
- Gillon Cameron – strings
- John Mercalfe – strings
- Frances Dewar – strings
