= Patterns (Small Faces song) =

Single by English rock band Small Faces

- West German picture sleeve

Single by Small Faces
- B-side: "E Too D"
- Released: 26 May 1967
- Recorded: 1966
- Studio: IBC, London
- Genre: Beat; freakbeat; R&B
- Length: 2:05
- Label: Decca
- Songwriters: Steve Marriott; Ronnie Lane
- Producer: Small Faces

Small Faces singles chronology
"I Can't Make It" (1967)	"Patterns" (1967)	"Here Come the Nice" (1967)

Audio
- "Patterns" on YouTube

"Patterns" is a song written by Steve Marriott and Ronnie Lane and originally recorded by their band Small Faces. The band had split with manager Don Arden and Decca Records, instead signing with Immediate Records. To cash in on the loss of their band, Arden and Decca planned to issue material by the group concurrently with their Immediate releases. "Patterns" was one of the few unreleased Small Faces songs still in Arden's possession. It is an R&B and beat song with influences from freakbeat. Lyrically, the song is more complex than the Small Faces' previous work. "Patterns" is unusually sung by Lane.

Decca released "Patterns" as a single on 27 May 1967 with "E Too D" on the B-side. The single was unauthorized by the band, who were furious about the release and publicly denounced it and refused to promote it. As such, "Patterns" became a commercial failure, peaking at number 51 on the Record Retailer chart and being surpassed by "Here Come the Nice", which Immediate issued a week later. Contemporary reception was mixed, with critics noting the song's driving beat but dismissing it as unimportant. As a direct result of its chart failure, Decca released the compilation album From the Beginning a week after the single.

== Background and composition ==
In late 1966, followed by the unauthorized release of the Small Faces' sixth single "My Mind's Eye", the Small Faces fell out with their manager Don Arden. By the end of the year, they had severed ties with both Arden and their record label, Decca Records. Instead, the band signed with independent record label Immediate Records, which was run by Andrew Loog Oldham and Tony Calder, the latter of whom purchased the band's recording contract from Arden for £25,000. (Note: The Small Faces were not directly signed to Decca Records, instead bound by a contract with Arden's production company Contemporary Music who leased the band's recordings to Decca.) Despite this, Immediate had agreed to produce and lease the Small Faces recordings to Decca until the licensing issues were resolved, leaving the band in a "state of limbo". The band fulfilled this deal with the single "I Can't Make It" in March 1967. Although now being completely free to record for Immediate, unbeknownst to the band, Arden and Decca planned to cash in on the Small Faces' success by releasing previously unreleased recordings.

Composed by guitarist Steve Marriott and bassist Ronnie Lane, drummer Kenney Jones stated that "Patterns" was one of only a "handful of completed recordings" by the band that Arden still had in his possession. The song's master tape was handed to Arden sometime during the latter part of 1966, and it was recorded at IBC Studios in London. Writing for Louder Sound, music critic Paul Lester identified it alongside "My Mind's Eye" as "R&B-infused tracks with one eye on the freakbeat future". More negatively, biographers John Hellier and Paolo Hewitt refer to "Patterns" as "only a very ordinary song" and as "Beat group bullshit". Roland Schmitt drew parallels between "Patterns" and Them's song "Gloria" (1964), in that both are similarly structured. Darlington also noted "Patterns" as more lyrically complex than their previous work, contrasting it to the lyrical content of Paul Simon's song "Patterns". Unusually for a Small Faces single, Ronnie Lane sings lead vocals, which, according to Andrew Darlington, suited the band's "less histronic material".

== Release and reception ==
To cash in on the Immediate deal, Decca released "Patterns" as a single with the previously released "E Too D" on the B-side. It was one of a few finished tracks of ours that Arden had in the vault, but we didn't promote it anyway, knowing we wouldn't get paid, so we were well pleased when it died a death.

— Ian McLagan (1998)

Decca released "Patterns" as a single in the UK on 26 May 1967, (Note: Catalogue number F.12619.) in a move which Jones described as the final "sting" that Arden had "up his tail". "Patterns" directly interfered with the band's intended single release, "Here Come the Nice", which Immediate would issue one week later on 2 June. The B-side of "Patterns" was the previously released "E Too D", which had appeared on their debut album Small Faces in May 1966. The Small Faces were furious over the release of the single, as they opined it was unrepresentative of their new musical style. Despite this, they were unable to prohibit its release, as Arden's Contemporary Music owned the publishing rights to the song. The band publicly denounced the single's release and made no effort to promote it in the media. "Patterns" failed to chart in the singles charts published by the British trade magazines, but reached number 51 on the Record Retailer's "Bubbling Under" chart in early June 1967. (Note: By contrast, "Here Come the Nice" reached number 12 on the Record Retailer chart.)

Although she felt that "Patterns" had the "usual aggressiveness" associated with the Small Faces, Penny Valentine of Disc and Music Echo believed that she was "not really with" that "kind of thing at all" in regards to the single. Despite this, she felt it would be a hit owing to the Small Faces' popularity. On the contrary, Derek Johnson of the New Musical Express believed that "plenty of their fans" would enjoy the single despite the band's apathy, citing the "driving, compulsive beat", "rich fruity sound" and a lyric that was "absorbing without being complex" as factors in the single's "considerable amount of appeal". He believed the tune to be "simple yet catchy" so that it "registered quickly". Peter Jones of Record Mirror felt that "Patterns" had a strong vocal line with a "fine, compact backing" and that it "held up well". On the contrary, he also believed it was "nothing too startling".

The band's keyboardist Ian McLagan identified the summer of 1967 as a "very intense time" for the band, with "their releases present in record shops like measles". When "Patterns" failed to reach any major chart positions in the UK, Decca released the unauthorized compilation album From the Beginning on 2 June, composed primarily of unreleased material. Two weeks later, on 23 June, the band's second studio album Small Faces was released on Immediate. As From the Beginning and Small Faces peaked at number 17 and number 12 respectively on the Record Retailer albums chart, several band biographers have noted that the Immediate releases beat the Decca releases "Patterns" and From the Beginning. Darlington believed that Lane's lead vocals, supplemented on backing vocals by Marriott, made "Patterns" sound untypical for Small Faces records, and probably contributed to its commercial failure. Retrospectively, critics have noted "Patterns" as one of the Small Faces' weaker songs, yet as one which prospectively saw the band's future switch in musical direction.

== Charts ==
Chart performance
Chart (1967)	Peak position
UK (Record Retailer)	51
