= The Knack (British band) =

British freakbeat/psychedelic rock band

- Origin: Ilford, United Kingdom
- Genres: Rock; R&B; freakbeat; psychedelic; folk rock; garage rock
- Years active: 1964-1968
- Labels: Decca, Piccadilly
- Past members: Paul Gurvitz; Adrian Gurvitz; Brian Morris; Louis Farrel; Gearie Kenworthy; Topper Clay; Tim Mycroft; Denny Laine

The Knack were a British R&B-based freakbeat and psychedelic rock band from Ilford, near London in the United Kingdom who were active 1960s. They are not to be confused with either of the two American bands of the same name, one from the 1960s and the other who became a popular new wave act in the late 1970s. They were unable to achieve any hits in the UK or elsewhere, but in more recent years their work has come to the attention of music enthusiasts.

== History ==
The band hailed from Ilford, a town north of London in 1964. Their membership included Paul Gurvitz, their leader, on guitar and vocals, Brian Morris on guitar, and Louis Farrel on drums. They made ventures to Germany and France to play for American servicemen. Upon returning to England, they were invited to play as backing band for 1950s rocker Gene Vincent, who had set up a base of operations in the UK. Paul Gurvitz's father, Sam Guvitz, who had previously worked as road manager for the Shadows, was currently Vincent's road manager. After several months as Vincent's backing act, the group were hired for a long term engagement at the Star Club in Hamburg, Germany. Performing under the name, the Londoners, they became a top attraction and were even invited to record cut a single for the Star Club's in-house record label. The single, which paired their version of Elvis Presley's "That's My Desire" a rendition of Sam Cooke's "Bring It On Home To Me," was issued strictly in Germany.

The band returned to England in 1965. Shortly after their return, Paul Gurvitz convinced the other members of the group to change their name to the Knack, a move inspired by the Richard Lester movie of the same name. The band would now cultivate a mod image. They brought in Gearie Kenworthy to play bass (born Gearie Jay Kenworthy, 17 October 1946, Scotland) Topper Clay (born Graham Peter Clay, 16 August 1944, Camberley, Surrey) to replace Louis Farrell on drums. With the new line-up the band became a formidable live act.

Sam Curtis, the Gurvitz brothers' father, was now the band's manager and used his leverage in the music industry to secure a contract with Decca. Their debut single was an energetic cover of the recent Kinks B-side, "Who'll Be The Next In Line," which was backed with the equally frantic "She Ain't No Good." Released in September 1965, it sold well enough to convince Decca to continue to work with the band. "Who'll Be The Next In Line" had been recommended to the group by former member of the Shadows, Tony Meehan. Later in 1965 the band released their second single for Decca featuring covers of two songs previously recorded by the Clique, "It's Love Baby (24 Hours a Day)" b/w "Time Time Time." The record failed to reach the charts, and Decca terminated their contract.

After leaving Decca, the band was signed with Piccadilly Records, a subsidiary of Pye Records. After their move to the new label, their music evolved away from its primitive beginnings and began to incorporate eclectic influences, such folk rock. Their first single with Picadilly would feature a version of the Lovin' Spoonful's "Did You Ever Have to Make Up Your Mind?" Despite lack of airplay, Piccadilly remained committed to the Knack. They followed it up with "Stop" b/w another Lovin' Spoonful cover, "Younger Girl." "Stop" turned out to be a modest success. Their next 45, "Save All My Love For Joey" b/w "Take My Love," was issued in October 1966. The single failed to replicate its predecessor's success. Their next release was the largely acoustic and folk-inspired "(Man from the) Marriage Guidance & Advice Bureau" b/w "Dolly Catcher Man," issued in February 1967. The Piccadilly label was in financial trouble and soon foundered, leaving the group without a label. Drummer Topper Clay departed and Louis Farrel returned to the drum throne. Guitarist Brian Morris left and was replaced not with a guitarist but a keyboardist, Tim Mycroft. During an interregnum in the summer of 1967, Paul Gurvitz did a brief stint with the group Rupert's People, but remained with the Knack. Though the Knack did not release any more material, they went to Olympic Studios in the fall of 1967 with producer Denny Cordell to cut a new song by Paul Gurvitz, the psychedelic "Light On The Wall"—long thought to be lost but for which an acetate has recently emerged. They played their last gig at the Roundhouse on 6 October with former Moody Blues member and future Paul McCartney and Wings axeman, Denny Laine.

Organist Tim Mycroft departed, leaving the Gurvitz brothers and drummer Louis Farrell. The Knack changed their name to the Gun and pursued a heavier rock direction. Gun scored a #8 hit on the British charts with "Race With the Devil." Organist Tim Mycroft joined the group Sounds Nice, who recorded for Parlophone Records in the late 1960s.

In the intervening years since their break-up, the Knack has come to the attention of music collectors and enthusiasts. Their complete recorded works have been compiled on the Time Time Time: The complete UK Singles and More anthology put out by Rev-Ola Records. Paul Gurvitz later went on to form The Gun Three Man Army Parrisn & Gurvitz The Graeme Edge Band & The Baker Gurvitz Army with legendary Cream drummer Ginger Baker & The New Army

== Membership ==
- Paul Gurvitz (guitar and vocals)
- Brian Morris (guitar and vocals)
- Louis Farrel (drums)
- Gearie Kenworthy (bass)
- Topper Clay (drums)
- Tim Mycroft (organ)
- Mick Palmer (bass)
