= Graham Stevens =

British architect

Graham Allan Stevens
- Born: 1944 (age 81–82); Witney, Oxfordshire
- Education: University of Sheffield
- Notable work: Desert Cloud (1974), Atmosfields (1971)
- Style: Inflatable Sculpture

Graham Allan Stevens is a British artist known for creating large-scale pneumatic sculptures. His work examines the architecture of atmospheric environments, and is characterised by an interest in lightweight, moving and responsive membranous structures. He is credited with pioneering the 'participatory inflatable', as a dynamic structure that exposes relationships both between people and their environment, and between viewer and artwork

== Career ==
Stevens was born in Witney, Oxfordshire in 1944. He studied architecture at the University of Sheffield in the mid-1960s, where, influenced by his professor J.K. Page, he experimented with lightweight membranes and the fluid-dynamic properties of architectural surfaces. In 1964, he worked as an assistant to Buckminster Fuller in Paris, during the International Congress of Modern Architecture.

One of Stevens' final projects at Sheffield, realised in collaboration with other students, was the 'body environment' Spacefield (1966), an immersive inflated environment designed with the full participation of the senses in mind. Architectural theorist Katarzyna Balug draws links between this project and the approaches of contemporaneous architects such as Rayner Banham, who developed ideas of buildings in dynamic relationships to both occupants and environments

After graduating from Sheffield in 1966, Stevens was invited to participate in Gustav Metzger's Destruction in Art Symposium, where he exhibited a series of 'transmobile' inflatable pods filled with water, and an air-filled inflatable landscape; in both cases participants were invited to climb and walk on the structures. The proceeding year, Stevens attended the 1st International Colloquium on Pneumatic Structures organised by architect Frei Otto at the University of Stuttgart, which further inspired his exploration of environmental awareness through pneumatic art. It was at this event that Stevens met the architect Cedric Price, who, along with the engineer Frank Newby supported Stevens in constructing more ambitious pneumatic forms

In 1971, Stevens released the film Atmosfields, which documented two years' worth of work revealing the 'aesthetic of air', produced between 1968 and 1970. Stevens describe the 'Atmosfields' featured in the film as demonstrating "a controlled use of natural forces with direct implication for living environments". Among the included works was a series of large-scale 'air sculptures' floating in St Katharine Docks, allowing people to climb and walk over the water. In the same year, Stevens also appeared in a documentary produced by Scottish Television, documenting artistic projects funded by the Scottish Arts Council. Interviewed about one such air sculpture, in which participants walk across St Mary's Loch in a plastic bubble, Stevens describes his approach as using "materials in the landscape... to relate to the air and the water a bit more deeply".

One of Stevens' most famous works features in his film Desert Cloud (1974), a floating canopy installed in the Arabian Desert, in Kuwait. The 'cloud' absorbs solar radiation, causing air trapped in the canopy to heat and expand, holding the structure in the air through natural buoyancy. Talking about the work, Stevens remarked that:

"Desert Cloud was a move away from the singular notion of shelter as a protection against the outside, towards a new conception of shelter in which you experience the atmosphere, the environment."

Stevens' work is also characterised throughout his career by a serious interest in art's relation to both technology and industry. He was involved in the early days of the Artist Placement Group, the contribution of which he later characterised in terms of their infrastructural achievements. Based on his interest in structures with environmental and energetic properties, Stevens founded Atmospheric Industries Ltd., a co-operative company with the remit of Water, Architecture Industry, Building, Transport and Communications. The company was formed in 2010, and dissolved in 2017.

== Legacy ==
Along with other pioneers of pneumatic structures from the 1960s, Stevens' influence on architectural design has been more recently recognised, both for its aesthetic and environmental qualities. Along with architects and artists including Otto Piene and Buckminster Fuller, his work featured as part of the exhibition The New Inflatable Moment at the Boston Society of Architects in 2017, which examined the re-emergence of pneumatic architecture. Discussing Desert Cloud, curator Mary Hale said that "Stevens was a pioneer in studying how inflatables can make the world a better place by experimenting with physical principals".

Stevens' work is featured in the collections of the Frac Centre-Val de Loire and Centre Pompidou, in the latter under the category 'experimental architecture'. Desert Cloud was included as part of the 2021 'Art and Ecology' exhibition at Centre Pompidou, alongside an updated work called Carbon Cloud (2013).

== See also ==
- Hans Haacke
