= Some Things Just Stick in Your Mind =

1965 single by Vashti Bunyan

Single by Vashti Bunyan
- B-side: "I Want to Be Alone"
- Released: May 1965
- Genre: Pop
- Label: Decca
- Songwriter: Jagger–Richards
- Producer: Andrew Loog Oldham

Vashti Bunyan singles chronology
| "Some Things Just Stick in Your Mind" (1965) | "Train Song" (1966) |

"Some Things Just Stick in Your Mind" is a song written by Jagger–Richards of the Rolling Stones, released first by the singing duo Dick and Dee Dee in early 1965, who were a supporting act for the Rolling Stones when they first toured the U.S. in 1964, and then by Vashti Bunyan in May 1965 as her debut single. Jimmy Page played guitar on this song, during his session work of the sixties.

Bunyan's recording went virtually unnoticed at the time, but became a rare collector's item after her resurgence in the 2000s. It was then reissued on the compilation Some Things Just Stick in Your Mind - Singles and Demos 1964 to 1967 (2007).

Recorded with Jagger on vocals at Regent Sounds Studios and Decca Studios, London, England, July 1-10 1964.

Musicians: Jim Sullivan (guitar) plus unconfirmed overdubs by Jon Tiven (guitar), Doug Schlink (guitar), Paul Ossola (bass), Vic Steffens (drums) and Christine Ohlman (backing vocals)

Released only on the Rolling Stones outtakes and demos 1975 album Metamorphosis.
