= Vashti Bunyan =

English singer-songwriter (born 1945)

- Bunyan at the Barbican Centre in 2022

Background information
- Born: Jennifer Vashti Bunyan; 2 March 1945 (age 81); Newcastle upon Tyne, Tyne and Wear, England
- Genre: Folk
- Occupation: Singer-songwriter
- Instruments: Vocals; guitar
- Years active: 1965–1970; 2002–present
- Labels: Decca; Columbia; Philips; Spinney/Branch; DiCristina Stair Builders; FatCat
- Website: anotherday.co.uk

Jennifer Vashti Bunyan (born 2 March 1945) is an English singer-songwriter. She began her career in the mid-1960s and released a debut album, Just Another Diamond Day, in 1970. The album sold very few copies and Bunyan, discouraged, abandoned her musical career. By 2000, the album had acquired a cult following; it was re-released and Bunyan recorded more songs, beginning the second phase of her musical career after a gap of thirty years. She released two more albums, Lookaftering in 2005, and Heartleap in 2014.

== Early life and education ==
Bunyan was born in South Tyneside in 1945, the youngest of three children of John Bunyan and Helen Webber. She was told that she was named after a boat that had belonged to her father. 'Vashti' was also a nickname for her mother, inspired by the Biblical Persian queen Vashti. She has been said to be descended from John Bunyan, author of The Pilgrim's Progress, but she has denied this.

The family moved to London when she was six months old. In the early 1960s, she studied at the Ruskin School of Drawing and Fine Art at Oxford University, but was expelled in 1964 for focusing on learning guitar and writing songs instead of art.

== Musical career ==
=== 1960s ===
At age 18, Bunyan visited New York City, discovered the music of Bob Dylan through his The Freewheelin' Bob Dylan album, and decided that she wanted to be a musician. In London the following year, an actress friend of her mother's introduced her to the Rolling Stones' manager, Andrew Loog Oldham, who signed her up to fill the gap left by Marianne Faithfull, who had recently left the label, and gave her a Jagger–Richards song to record, "Some Things Just Stick in Your Mind". This was released in June 1965 as Bunyan's first single under the name 'Vashti', with Jimmy Page contributing on guitar. Her own composition, "I Want to Be Alone", which she had wanted to be the A-side, was on the B-side. She released a follow-up, "Train Song", produced by Canadian Peter Snell and released on Columbia in May 1966. Both singles received little attention. Bunyan said later that at that point she specifically wanted to be a pop singer, not a folk artist, and that the choice had been hers.

Her distinctive vocal appeared on "The Coldest Night of the Year" by Twice as Much on their second and final LP, That's All, released by Oldham's Immediate Records in 1968. She recorded more (unreleased) songs for Immediate Records, and made a brief appearance in the 1967 documentary Tonite Let's All Make Love in London with her song "Winter Is Blue". She said she had enjoyed performing on TV pop shows, but felt as if she was "watching from the outside".

In the spring of 1967, Bunyan left her job in a veterinary practice in London and set off with guitar and dog to reconnect with Robert Lewis, a rebellious art student she had met two years previously, with whom she was later to have three children. She heard from singer-songwriter Donovan that he was hoping to set up a community on Skye, a "West Coast Renaissance" of artists, musicians and poets, and Bunyan, whose "mother's grandfather had been a Romany", and Lewis bought an old wagon and a horse from a Romany traveller and set off on a 650-mile trek to Skye from South London. During the trip, Bunyan began to write the songs that would appear on her first album, Just Another Diamond Day. She recalled later, "It was a way to escape, but with a purpose. We didn't know where we were going to be tomorrow, but it'd be somewhere down the road. What saved me was that I didn't have to think too hard about anything except wood for the fire, water for the horse. Immediate things." She said that she and Lewis had wanted to re-shape their lives and reject a world in which they felt they did not belong. "I had wanted to go back and find out how things used to be before the internal combustion engine, without thinking how hard life could be." On their journey they discovered the kindness of strangers. "I wanted to get back that feeling of childlike wonder, to remember what it was like to find the world extraordinary."

In the harsh winter of 1968, Bunyan took a break from the journey in the Lake District and went to the Netherlands to try an unsuccessful tour performing in pubs and bars. There she met a friend of Donovan's, American folk-blues musician Derroll Adams. When Bunyan sang for him, he told her, "You have to let people hear these songs. You mustn't hide your light." She immediately returned to England. The song "Diamond Day" came to her on the train from Belgium to London. A friend introduced her to producer Joe Boyd, who offered to record an album of her travelling songs for his company, Witchseason Productions, and introduced her to folk musicians the Incredible String Band.

Bunyan and Lewis resumed their pilgrimage northwards in March 1969, surviving on very little, and reached the Scottish highlands and finally the island of Skye, where they found that the "Renaissance community" had dissolved and there was nowhere for them to live. They settled instead on the nearby island of Berneray, where Bunyan recalled being inspired by the spartan lives of the old women who befriended them, one of whom sang ancient songs to them in Gaelic and "made up stories to tell visiting Scottish folklore collectors."

In late 1969, Bunyan returned briefly to Boyd in London and recorded fourteen songs for her first LP over a six-week period in his Sound Techniques studio, with assistance from guitarist Simon Nicol and violinists Dave Swarbrick of Fairport Convention and Robin Williamson of the Incredible String Band, and string arranger Robert Kirby. She later discovered that she had been pregnant with her first child while recording the album.

She left Berneray with Lewis in April 1970 and returned briefly to London in an unsuccessful attempt to resume her musical career. Just Another Diamond Day appeared on Philips Records in December 1970 to warm reviews, but struggled to find an audience. Bunyan said that for decades after that she saw it as a failure and could not listen to it. She has also said that she completely lost confidence in herself and her abilities when, for the first time, in a television show, she saw and heard Joni Mitchell sing. "I thought, 'I can never do that'. It had a huge effect on me. From that moment on I never believed in myself. For about 30 years I gave up on music altogether ... I didn't even sing to my children. I don't like to admit it, but that's what happened."

Disappointed, Bunyan left the music industry in 1971 and moved with Lewis for a few months to the Incredible String Band's Glen Row cottages in the Scottish Borders, then walked to the west coast of Ireland and returned to Scotland. She spent much of the ensuing thirty years raising her three children. During this time, unknown to her, the original album slowly became one of the most sought-after records of its time. Copies have sold online on Discogs for as much as US$3,946 (approximately UK £3,070).

=== 2000 to present ===
In 2000, Just Another Diamond Day was re-released on CD with bonus tracks and introduced Bunyan's music to a new generation of folk artists such as Devendra Banhart and Joanna Newsom. In 2001, Banhart wrote to Bunyan asking for advice, which began her connection with many of the contemporary performers who cite her work. In 2002, she was invited by Piano Magic musician Glen Johnson to sing guest vocals on his song "Crown of the Lost", her first recording in over thirty years. She subsequently appeared on Devendra Banhart's 2004 album Rejoicing in the Hands and provided vocals for Animal Collective's 2005 EP Prospect Hummer.

In 2005, encouraged by the positive reaction to the re-release of Just Another Diamond Day, Bunyan recorded and released a second album, Lookaftering, on Fat Cat Records, 35 years after the first. The album, produced by composer Max Richter, featured many of her contemporary followers including Banhart, Joanna Newsom, Adem Ilhan, Kevin Barker of Currituck Co, Otto Hauser of Espers and Adam Pierce of Mice Parade, and was well received.

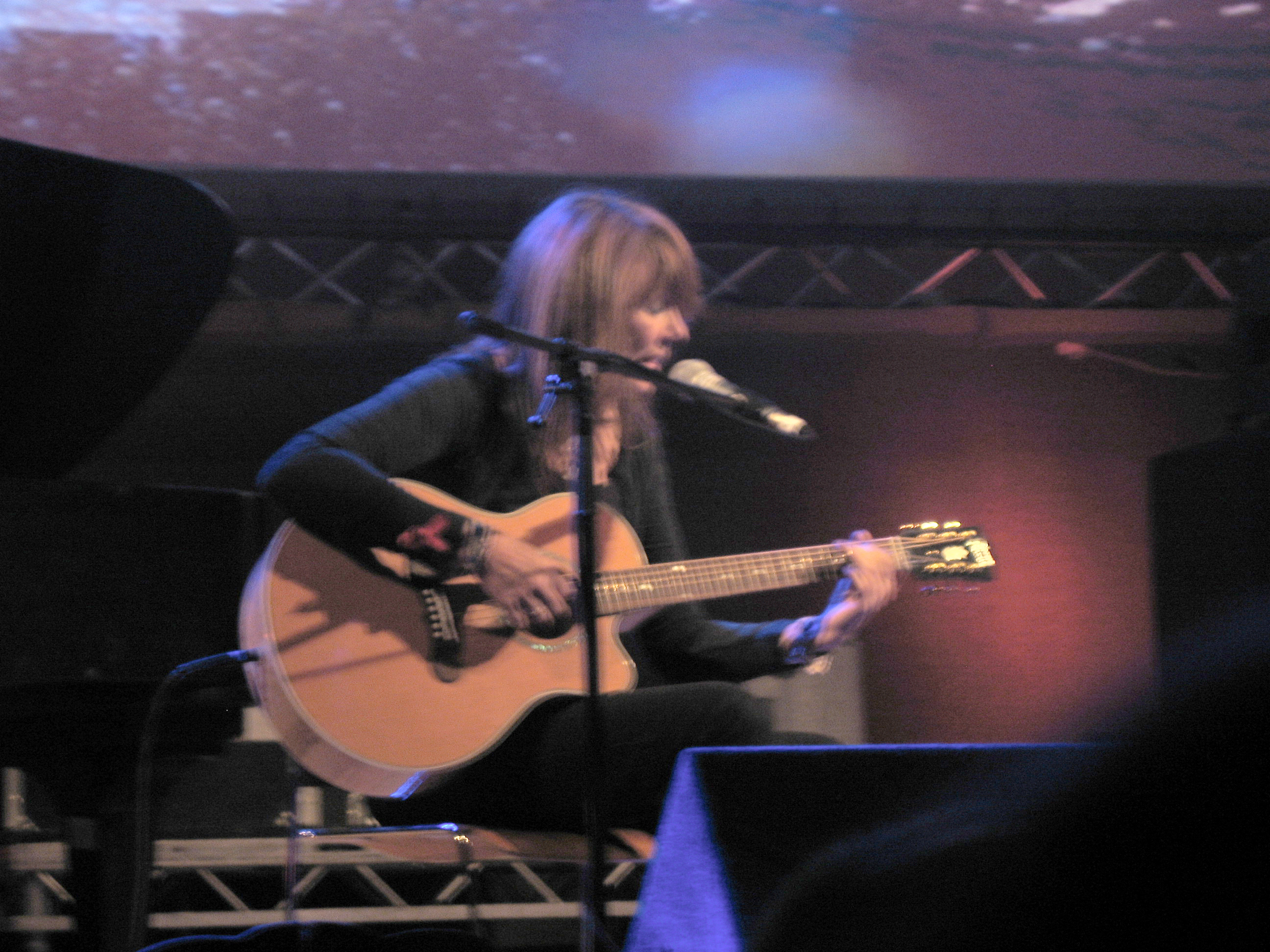
Bunyan performing at the Summer Sundae festival in Leicester in 2006

In the autumn of 2006, Bunyan assembled an ad hoc band and embarked on a brief North American tour, with performances in Canada and the US. She performed songs from both of her solo albums and some of the rare material from the unreleased Oldham sessions.

In 2007, Bunyan collaborated with novelist Rodge Glass on a song entitled "The Fire" for a compilation album Ballads of the Book, which was devised to combine Scottish writers with Scottish singers (Bunyan lives in Edinburgh). She also provided vocals on three songs for the debut solo album of former Jack frontman Anthony Reynolds, British Ballads. Bunyan sang with Reynolds on "Country Girl", "Just So You Know" and "Song of Leaving."

In October 2007, a compilation album was released of her mid-1960s singles and unreleased demos, entitled Some Things Just Stick in Your Mind - Singles and Demos 1964 to 1967. Train Song, from this compilation, was used as the theme for the Amazon Prime Video series Patriot (2015-18).

In January 2008, Bunyan said she was in the process of recording a new album. "I'm supposed to be writing just now. I have one complete song and a whole lot of fragments. I'm supposed to have them finished by May, and there's no way."

In June 2008, Bunyan appeared at London's Royal Festival Hall with the Heritage Orchestra as part of Massive Attack's Meltdown, in a live performance of Vangelis' Blade Runner soundtrack, singing "Rachel's Song" as sung by Mary Hopkin on the original soundtrack. In October 2008 a feature documentary about her, Vashti Bunyan: From Here To Before, directed by Kieran Evans, had its world premiere at the Times BFI London Film Festival. The documentary retraced Bunyan's journey across the UK and Ireland against the backdrop of her first high-profile London concert, using her trip through the UK and Ireland as its narrative structure. As it had the first time, the album provided a soundtrack for the journey. In 2011, Bunyan's cover of John Martyn's "Head and Heart" appeared on the tribute album, Johnny Boy Would Love This...A Tribute to John Martyn.

In June 2014, Bunyan announced her third and final album, Heartleap. She wrote, "The whole point of the album was finally to learn a way that would enable me to record the music that is in my head, by myself. I neither read nor write music, nor can I play piano with more than one hand at a time, but I have loved being able to work it all out for myself and make it sound the way I wanted. I've built these songs over years. The album wouldn't have happened any other way." Heartleap was released on 6 October in the UK by FatCat Records and 7 October in the US by DiCristina. The cover artwork was created by Bunyan's daughter, Whyn Lewis, who also contributed the artwork for Lookaftering.

In 2022, Bunyan published a memoir, Wayward: Just Another Life to Live (White Rabbit Books). In 2023, she was invited by singer-songwriter Lail Arad to perform alongside Emeli Sande, Sam Amidon, Eska and This Is The Kit in a tribute concert at London's Roundhouse in April 2024 to celebrate Joni Mitchell's 80th year. In May 2024, it was announced that Bunyan would receive an honorary doctorate from the Royal Conservatoire of Scotland in July 2024.

In 2025, her second album, Lookaftering, was reissued by Fat Cat records, 20 years after its original release. It included nine previously unheard home demos from the 2005 sessions with producer Max Richter and a live recording from a 2006 concert in Los Angeles. In the new sleeve notes, Devendra Banhart described Lookaftering as "a quiet prayer for a world left behind, a remembrance of a world that could have been but never was".

== Legacy ==
In 2008, Bunyan was labelled "the Godmother of Freak Folk" for her role in inspiring the "new generation of folk experimentalists including Devendra Banhart and Adem". Her music has been categorized as folk, psychedelic folk, or new folk.

Despite this, she has often said that she is not a folk singer: "... I find it quite hard to read myself described as a folk singer, because I'm not." Her former producer Joe Boyd said in the 2008 Kieran Evans film From Here to Before, that he never considered Bunyan to be "... much of a folkie".

== Discography ==
=== Studio albums ===
- Just Another Diamond Day (Philips, 1970) UK Record Store No. 29 2022
- Lookaftering (Fat Cat Records, 2005) UK Indie No. 24
- Heartleap (Fat Cat Records, 2014) UK Indie No. 35

=== Compilations ===
- Some Things Just Stick in Your Mind – Singles and Demos 1964 to 1967 (Fat Cat Records/Spinney Records, 2007) UK Indie No. 26

=== Singles ===
- "Some Things Just Stick in Your Mind" / "I Want to Be Alone" (Decca, 1965) (as Vashti)
- "Train Song" / "Love Song" (Columbia, 1966) (as Vashti)
- "How Could You Let Me Go" (Light in the Attic, 2023)

=== Compilation appearances ===
- Tonite Lets All Make Love in London (1967)
  - "Winter Is Blue" (as Vashti)
  - "Winter Is Blue (Reprise)" (as Vashti)
- Circus Days – UK Psychedelic Obscurities 1966–70 Vol.1 (1990)
  - "I'd Like to Walk Around in Your Mind" (as Vashti)
- A Pot by Any Other Name (2001) (compilation issued by Ptolemaic Terrascope magazine)
  - "17 Pink Sugar Elephants" (rec. 1966) (early variation of "Train Song")
- Instant Karma (2002)
  - "Winter Is Blue" (as Vashti) (combined version of song from Tonite Lets All Make Love in London)
- Folk Rock and Faithfull: Dream Babes Vol. 5 (2004)
  - "Train Song" (rec. 1966) (as Vashti)
  - "Love Song" (rec. 1966) (as Vashti)
- The Golden Apples of the Sun (2004)
  - "Rejoicing in the Hands" (with Devendra Banhart)
- The Enlightened Family: A Collection Of Lost Songs (2005)
  - "Song of a Wishwanderer" (rec. 1968)
- Not Alone (2006)
  - "Same But Different"
- Ballads of the Book (2007)
  - "The Fire" (lyrics by Rodge Glass)
- Gather in the Mushrooms – The British Acid-Folk Underground 1968 – 1974 (2004)
  - "Winter Is Blue"
- Johnny Boy Would Love This...A Tribute to John Martyn (2011)
  - "Head and Heart"
- Way to Blue: The Songs of Nick Drake (2013)
  - "Which Will"

=== Guest appearances ===
- Twice as Much – That's All (1970)
  - "Coldest Night of the Year" (rec. 1967)
- Piano Magic – Writers Without Homes (2002)
  - "Crown of the Lost"
- Piano Magic – Saint Marie EP (2004)
  - "Dark Ages"
- Devendra Banhart – Rejoicing in the Hands (2004)
  - "Rejoicing in the Hands"
- Animal Collective – Prospect Hummer (2005)
  - "It's You"
  - "Prospect Hummer"
  - "I Remember Learning How to Dive"
- Vetiver – Thing of the Past (2008)
  - "Sleep a Million Years"
- Dudley Benson – Forest: Songs by Hirini Melbourne (2010)
  - "Tui"
- We/Or/Me – The Walking Hour (2013)
  - "Time"
- Devendra Banhart - Ma (2019)
  - "Will I See You Tonight?"
- The Avalanches - We Will Always Love You (2020)
  - "Reflecting Light"
- Devendra Banhart (2023)
  - "How Could You Let Me Go?" (From the compilation album "Light in the Attic and Friends")
- Sega Bodega - I Created the Universe so That Life Could Create a Language so Complex, Just to Say How Much I Love You (2025)
  - "Pipe"

== Bibliography ==
- Wayward: Just Another Life to Live (2022)

== In popular culture ==
- Bunyan's voice was heard on Saint Etienne Presents Finisterre (2005), a documentary about London featuring the music of the band Saint Etienne.
- Friend, fellow folk singer and longtime fan Devendra Banhart reportedly writes her name on his arm before some concerts.
- Lush covered her song "I'd Like To Walk Around in Your Mind". They got to know it from the Circus Days compilation.
- A cover of "Train Song" performed by Ben Gibbard and Feist appeared on Dark Was The Night, a charity compilation benefiting HIV/AIDS awareness and the Red Hot Organization. It was released by 4AD on 17 February 2009.
- "Diamond Day" was featured in the popular UK teen comedy/drama Skins on the third series (2009), episode six entitled "Naomi".
- Her song "Here Before" was covered by the Swedish artist Fever Ray, released as the B-side of the 2009 single "Stranger Than Kindness".
- "Here Before" also featured in the soundtrack for the 2008 BBC production Heist, about a medieval burglary.
- She is name-checked in the Half Man Half Biscuit song "Totnes Bickering Fair", from the 2008 album CSI:Ambleside.
- Bunyan's link to the back-to-the-land counterculture of the 1970s and the insightful expressions of 'nature' in her work have been discussed in an academic paper in 2009 by geographer Keith Halfacree ('"Glow worms show the path we have to tread": the counterurbanisation of Vashti Bunyan', Social and Cultural Geography 10: 771–789).
- "Train Song" was selected as the background music for Samsung's 2011 SMART TV commercial.
- "Train Song" was also featured in the 2014 American HBO television show True Detective.
- "Train Song" was used in the ad for Reebok 'Join The Migration' in 2014.
- "Train Song" was used in the first episode of the fifth season of television series Brassic.
- "Diamond Day" was featured in the Australian film Babyteeth in 2019.
- "I'd Like to Walk Around in Your Mind" is featured at the beginning of the 2017 Turkish film Kedi.
- Several verses of the song "Diamond Day" are sung by a character in the 2023 American drama film Fremont; the song is also played over the ending credits.
- "Train Song" was used in Episode 7 of the Apple TV series Down Cemetery Road in 2025.
