= Ginger Johnson =

Nigerian percussionist and bandleader (1916–1975)

- Born: George Folunsho Johnson; 1916; Ijebu-Ode, Nigeria
- Died: July 15, 1975 (age 58/59) Lagos, Nigeria
- Genres: Yoruba music, jazz, rock Funk
- Occupations: Bandleader, instrumentalist
- Instruments: Percussion, vocals
- Years active: c. 1942–75
- Labels: Melodisc, Masquerade

George Folunsho "Ginger" Johnson (1916 – July 15, 1975) was a Nigerian percussionist and bandleader who was a prominent musician in London from the 1950s to the early 1970s. He led Ginger Johnson and His African Messengers, and recorded and performed with Edmundo Ros, The Rolling Stones, Ronnie Scott and Quincy Jones among many others.

== Biography ==
Johnson was born in Ijebu-Ode, Nigeria. His father was of Yoruba origin and his mother was from Brazil; he was nicknamed "Ginger" for his reddish hair and freckles. He was orphaned at a young age and brought up by his sister, developing an interest in both classical and traditional music. He joined the Navy in Nigeria in the mid-1930s, and in 1943 travelled to London to join the British Merchant Navy. After the end of World War II he decided to settle in London, and worked as a musician.

He performed and recorded as an African percussionist with Ronnie Scott from the late 1940s onwards. In 1950 he joined the Edmundo Ros Orchestra as its lead percussionist, and recorded several albums with the band. He also played in orchestras led by Paul Adam and Harry Parry. He married and started a family, and at the same time became well known among a wide community of African and Caribbean musicians who had migrated to England. He also recorded a number of 78s and 45s for the Melodisc label in London during the 1950s; these were among the first recordings of African music in Britain.

During the 1960s he played with many leading jazz and rock music in what became known as "Swinging London", becoming a well-known figure in the city's counter-culture. Among the musicians with whom he performed were Georgie Fame, Brian Auger, Long John Baldry, Graham Bond, Hawkwind, Genesis, and Elton John. He formed his own band, Ginger Johnson and his African Messengers, and was actively involved in the first Notting Hill Carnival in 1966. In March 1967 he recorded an album, African Party (also known as Music from Africain), engineered by John Wood and released on the Masquerade label. For the album's sleeve notes, he said:

"All the music that we do is based firmly on African traditions. So is rhythm and blues – but we try to get nearer the source, right down to the grass roots of the jungle – the sun, the heat, the insects, the abundance of life. And we overlay the whole with jazz – saxophone, guitar, brass, flute, and sometimes piano – because jazz is also derived from the old sources of Africa."

He performed at a Royal Variety Performance and made a number of television appearances, as well as running workshops at the Royal College of Music and elsewhere. He also ran a club, the Iroko in Haverstock Hill. He was featured in events such as The 14 Hour Technicolor Dream at the Alexandra Palace in April 1967, and supported the Rolling Stones at their Stones in the Park performance in Hyde Park in July 1969.

According to Stewart Feather, an original GLF member, Ginger Johnson and his band performed at the 1972 UK first Gay Pride March.

Johnson became ill during a visit to Lagos, Nigeria, in 1975, and died there from a heart attack.

Two of his 1950s recordings were issued on a compilation CD, London Is The Place For Me 4: African Dreams and the Piccadilly High Life, in 2006. The album African Party was re-released on Freestyle Records in London on 22 June 2015.
