= I Can't Make It =

- West German picture sleeve

Single by Small Faces
- B-side: "Just Passing"
- Released: 3 March 1967
- Recorded: 8 January 1967
- Studio: Olympic, London
- Genre: Rhythm and blues
- Length: 3:06
- Label: Decca
- Songwriters: Steve Marriott; Ronnie Lane
- Producers: Steve Marriott; Ronnie Lane

Small Faces singles chronology
"My Mind's Eye" (1966)	"I Can't Make It" (1967)	"Patterns" (1967)

Performance on Beat-Club
- "I Can't Make It" on YouTube

"I Can't Make It" is a song by the English rock band Small Faces. Released in March 1967, the single peaked at number 26 in the UK on the Record Retailer chart.

== Song profile ==
When "I Can't Make It" was released in 1967, Small Faces had acrimoniously left the management of Don Arden and were signed to Andrew Loog Oldham's Immediate label. However, due to contractual obligations, Decca released the song, and Immediate agreed to produce and license the song back to them until the issue was resolved. The band refused to promote the single and as a direct result, the song only managed to climb to No. 26 in the charts. The BBC also initially banned the song for the dubious sounding lyrics which they thought were of a sexual nature; the lyrics are actually ambiguous and it is left to the listener to decide their true meaning.

The B-side, "Just Passing", is a short whimsical song only a minute long and is in the style of The Beach Boys song, "You Still Believe in Me".

In April 1967, Small Faces performed a live version of "I Can't Make It" on the well-known British television show, Morecambe and Wise, as well as their UK number-one single, "All or Nothing". The recording is notable for the particularly strong live vocal performance by Marriott. The episode was transmitted six months later.

The song can be found on side two of the group's 1969 posthumous double-album The Autumn Stone. "I Can't Make It" and "Just Passing" were also released as bonus tracks on the deluxe editions of From the Beginning in 2012. Furthermore, stereo mixes of both tracks are included on the deluxe editions of the band's 1967 eponymous album.

== Personnel ==
Personnel according to the 2025 re-issue of The Autumn Stone.

- Steve Marriott – lead vocals, electric and acoustic guitars
- Ronnie Lane – bass, vocals
- Kenney Jones – drums, percussion
- Ian McLagan – piano, Hammond organ, vocals

== Charts ==
Weekly chart performance for "I Can't Make It"
Chart (1967)	Peak position
UK (Disc and Music Echo)	27
UK (New Musical Express)	21
UK (Melody Maker)	24
UK (Record Retailer)	26

== See also ==
- Small Faces discography
