= Alan Callan =

British music executive (1946–2014)

- Born: 1 August 1946; U.K.
- Died: 27 May 2014 (aged 67)
- Occupations: Businessman; record producer; music executive
- Children: 2

Alan Callan (1 August 1946 – 27 May 2014) was a British businessman, record producer and music executive. He worked as an executive for Swan Song Records (a record label established by English rock band Led Zeppelin in 1974), as a business manager for Jimmy Page and as a chairman for Scottish Open Championship Ltd. He was also the founder and CEO of the short-lived startup WorldSport.

== Personal life ==
He had a daughter and a son. He died on 27 May 2014, having been diagnosed with bone cancer in April 2000 and had been battling the disease over the years.
