= Twice as Much =

British musical duo

- Origin: London, England
- Genres: Pop music; psychedelic pop
- Instrument: Vocal duo
- Years active: 1966–1968
- Label: Immediate
- Members: David Skinner; Andrew Rose

Twice as Much was a British musical duo, composed of Dave Skinner (born David Ferguson Skinner, 4 July 1946, London) and Andrew Rose (born Andrew Colin Campbell Rose, 12 March 1946, Edgware, Middlesex), harmony singers who wrote much of their own material.

Their only UK Top 40 success as performers was a cover of the Mick Jagger / Keith Richards composition "Sittin' on a Fence" (1966). The Rolling Stones' version of the song, although recorded in December 1965, was not released on a Stones' album in the US until 1967, and not in the UK (where it again emerged as an album track) until 1969. Twice as Much were managed by Andrew Loog Oldham. Songs that were composed by the duo were recorded by Del Shannon, Chris Farlowe and P. P. Arnold.

In 1972, Skinner joined Uncle Dog, a group including vocalist Carol Grimes. He penned most of the tracks on their album, Old Hat. He was also a member of Clancy. In 1977/8, Skinner toured as the keyboard player with Roxy Music. He also contributed to albums by Phil Manzanera and Bryan Ferry.

Rose died Halstead, Essex on 8 July 2024, at the age of 78.

== Discography ==
=== Studio albums ===
- Own Up, (1966, Immediate Records, IMLP 007)
- That's All, (1968, Immediate Records, IMLP 013), including one song featuring vocals by Vashti Bunyan

=== Singles ===
- "Sittin' on a Fence", peaked at No. 25 in the UK Singles Chart in June 1966 (1966, Immediate Records, IM 033), peaked at No.122 BB [US]
- "Step Out of Line", (1966, Immediate Records, IM 036), peaked at No. 53 in the UK (Note: Chart position is from the official UK "Breakers List".)
- "True Story", (1966, Immediate Records, IM 039)
- "Is This What I Get for Loving You, Baby?", (1966, Immediate Records, IM23 724)
- "Crystal Ball", (1967, Immediate Records, IMI 504)
