= Marquis of Kensington =

British band

The Marquis of Kensington was a British studio project from the end of the 1960s. It consisted of Robert Wace, then manager of The Kinks, and the record producer Mike Leander (1941–1996). While the project's vocals are Wace's, Leander was featured on the single covers. Wace wanted to remain incognito.

The duo released three singles:

- "The Changing of the Guard" / "Reverse Thrust" (instrumental) (May 1967)
- "Sister Marie" / "Flash" (instrumental) (Feb 1968)
- "It Might As Well Rain Until September" / "Folks in the City" (Nov 1968)

In 1970, a cover of "Flash" by Italian instrumentalist Mario Battaini reached number 11 in the Dutch Top 40. He had released the song as The Duke of Burlington.
