= Peter Whitehead (filmmaker) =

English filmmaker (1937–2019)

Peter Lorrimer Whitehead (8 January 1937 – 10 June 2019) was an English writer and filmmaker known for documenting the counterculture movement in London and New York in the late 1960s.

== Early life and career ==
Peter Whitehead was born in Liverpool, England, into a working-class family. He received a scholarship to attend Ashville College, Harrogate, where he was top of his class in almost all subjects and was both captain of the rugby team and the church organist. This success led him to receive another scholarship from Peterhouse, Cambridge, to study mathematics, physics and chemistry. However, after completing his National Service, he switched his focus to physiology, mineralogy and crystallography. He later studied art and film at the Slade School of Art in London.

After leaving Cambridge, Whitehead began his career as a filmmaker. He is best known for directing promotional film clips (precursors to the modern music video), including a version of "Interstellar Overdrive" for Pink Floyd and several clips for The Rolling Stones. In 1966, Whitehead, together with the novelist and historian Andrew Sinclair, founded Lorrimer Publishing, which published the original screenplays of classic films. Sheridan Morley wrote: "Their format is a simple one: the script itself, with detailed descriptions where action takes over from the words, published with a brief introduction and sideline notes where necessary."

In 1969, Whitehead left filmmaking behind and retreated to the desert in Morocco, which he began his career as a falconer.

== The Falconer ==
In 1997, Iain Sinclair collaborated with Chris Petit, sculptor Steve Dilworth, digital artist Dave McKean and others to make The Falconer, a 56-minute semi-fictional "documentary" film about Whitehead, set in London and the Outer Hebrides. Sinclair described Whithead's engagement with the film in 2003, stating, "Initially he (Whitehead) loved the film... his determination to tell his story was such that he kept bombarding us with amazing fragments and endless images, because he's one of the few people whose entire life was documented in images". The film also features Stewart Home, Kathy Acker and Howard Marks.

== Books ==
Whitehead's books include Nora (1990), Hartshead Revisited: A Fiction? (1993) and Bronte Gate (1999). His novels include The Risen (1994) and Terrorism Considered as One of the Fine Arts (2007).

In 1997 Whitehead published Baby Doll (Velvet, 1997), drawing on photographs he took in 1972 during production of his feature-length film Daddy (made with artist Niki de Saint Phalle). Many of the photographs are of model/actress/heiress Mia Martin (known for her appearances in the Benny Hill shows and Hammer films such as The Satanic Rites of Dracula). The writer Iain Sinclair later described Daddy as a "nightmarish film... shot in some chateau in France... unspeakable... I couldn't even bring myself to look at the material in the book".

== Documentary ==
Paul Cronin produced a two-part documentary In the Beginning Was the Image: Conversations With Peter Whitehead (2006) featuring new and archival interviews with Whitehead, along with extracts from his work.

== Personal life and later years ==
During his time at Cambridge, Whitehead met Diane Cottrill and had two daughters, Tamsin and Sian. In 1959, he met Swedish student Britt Svensson, whom he married in Stockholm in 1960. They moved to London but divorced in 1964. In the 1960s, he met the actress Coral Atkins and had a son, Harry. In 1979, he formed a relationship with Deanna Jones, and they had a daughter Joanna Woodrow.

In 1980, he met Dido Goldsmith, the daughter of Teddy Goldsmith and niece of Sir James Goldsmith. They married six weeks after meeting and had four daughters, Robin, Leila, Charlene and Rosetta. Robin Whitehead, a film maker and photographer, died from a heroin overdose on 24 January 2010 at the age of 27. Her family alleged that Robin's involvement with the musician Pete Doherty and his circle of friends contributed to her death.

Whitehead died in London on 10 June 2019, at the age of 82.

== Filmography ==
- 1964 – The Perception of Life
- 1965 – Wholly Communion
- 1966 – Charlie Is My Darling
- 1967 – Tonite Let's All Make Love in London
- 1967 – The Beach Boys in London
- 1967 – Benefit of the Doubt
- 1967 – The Little Bastard Immediate
- 1969 – The Fall
- 1973 – Daddy, with Niki de Saint Phalle
- 1977 – Fire in the Water
- 1995 – London '66-'67
- 2009 – Terrorism Considered as One of the Fine Arts

== Music promos ==
- 1964
  - "St. Pauls Cathedral / Notting Hill'" (Jimmy James and the Vagabonds)
- 1965
  - "I'm Not Sayin'" (Nico)
- 1966-1972
  - "Have You Seen Your Mother, Baby, Standing in the Shadow?" – two versions (The Rolling Stones)
  - "Lady Jane" (The Rolling Stones)
  - "Let's Spend the Night Together" (The Rolling Stones)
  - "We Love You" (The Rolling Stones)
  - "Tumbling Dice" (The Rolling Stones)
  - "Get Off of My Cloud" (The Rolling Stones)
  - "Seven Drunken Nights" (The Dubliners)
  - "Hey Joe" (Jimi Hendrix)
  - "The Time Has Come" (P. P. Arnold)
  - "Dandelion" (The Rolling Stones)
  - "Ruby Tuesday" (The Rolling Stones)
  - "Interstellar Overdrive" (Pink Floyd)
  - "Pink Floyd in London" (Pink Floyd)
  - "(If You Think You're) Groovy" (P. P. Arnold & The Small Faces)
  - "Get Yourself Together" (The Small Faces)
  - "Itchycoo Park" (The Small Faces)
  - "She Was Perfection" (Murray Head)
  - "It Brings Me Down" (Billy Nichols)
  - "Maroc 7" (The Shadows)
  - "Bombay Duck" (The Shadows)
  - "When I Was Young" (Eric Burdon and the New Animals)
  - "Bath Festival" (Led Zeppelin)
  - "Royal Albert Hall" (Mike Oldfield)
  - "Royal Albert Hall" (Julie Felix)

== Bibliography ==
- Godard, Jean-Luc (1966). Alphaville: A Film. Translated by Whitehead, Peter. Lorrimer Films: London. (also Simon & Schuster, New York) English translation and description of action by Whitehead
- Godard, Jean-Luc (1969). Pierrot Le Fou. Translated by Whitehead, Peter. Lorrimer Films: London. (also Simon & Schuster, New York) English translation and description of action by Whitehead
- Whitehead, Peter (1990). Nora and... Brookside Press. ISBN 978-0851730127.
- Whitehead, Peter (1993). Hartshead Revisited: A Fiction?. Hathor Publishing. ISBN 978-0952203506.
- Whitehead, Peter (1994). The Risen. Hathor Publishing. ISBN 978-0952203513.
- Whitehead, Peter (1997). Baby Doll. Velvet Publications: London. ISBN 978-1871592788.
- Whitehead, Peter (1999). BrontëGate: The Memoirs of MI5 Agent Milton Crookshank, Edited by Peter Whitehead. A Gothic Romance. Hathor Publishing. ISBN 978-0952203520.
- Whitehead, Peter (1999). Tonite Let's All Make Love In London. Hathor Publishing. ISBN 978-0952203582.
- Whitehead, Peter (2007). Terrorism Considered as One of the Fine Arts. Hathor Publishing. ISBN 978-0952203568.
- Whitehead, Peter; Sorensen, John (2015). The Mystical Filmmaker: An Encounter. Sticking Place Books. ISBN 978-1942782186.
