= Progressive music =

Type of music that emphasizes expansion of form and stylistic variety

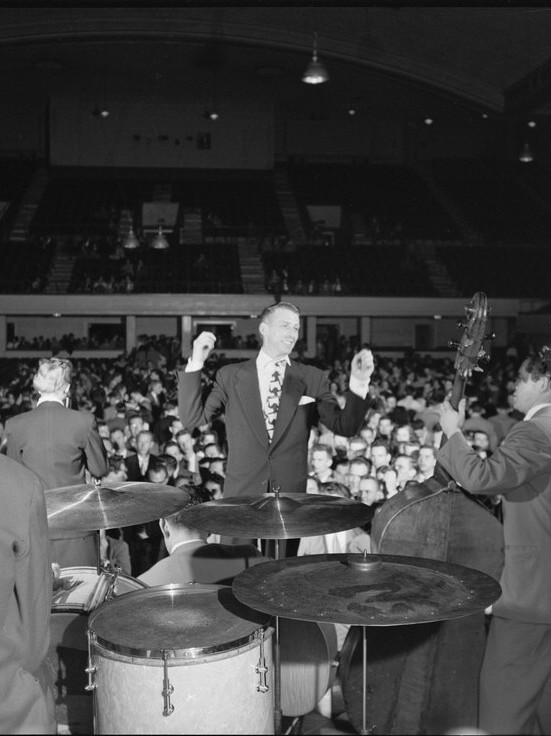
Bandleader Stan Kenton coined "progressive jazz" for his complex, loud, and brassy approach to big band jazz that conveyed an association with art music.

Progressive music is music that attempts to expand existing stylistic boundaries associated with specific genres of music. The word comes from the basic concept of "progress", which refers to advancements through accumulation, and is often deployed in the context of distinct genres, with progressive rock being the most notable example. Music that is deemed "progressive" usually synthesizes influences from various cultural domains, such as European art music, Celtic folk, West Indian, or African. It is rooted in the idea of a cultural alternative, and may also be associated with auteur-stars and concept albums, considered traditional structures of the music industry.

As an art theory, the progressive approach falls between formalism and eclecticism. "Formalism" refers to a preoccupation with established external compositional systems, structural unity, and the autonomy of individual art works. Like formalism, "eclecticism" connotes a predilection toward style synthesis or integration. However, contrary to formalist tendencies, eclecticism foregrounds discontinuities between historical and contemporary styles and electronic media, sometimes referring simultaneously to vastly different musical genres, idioms, and cultural codes. In marketing, "progressive" is used to distinguish a product from "commercial" pop music.

== Jazz ==
Progressive jazz is a form of big band that is more complex or experimental. It originated in the 1940s with arrangers who drew from modernist composers such as Igor Stravinsky and Paul Hindemith. (Note: According to academic Tim Wall, the most significant example of the struggle between Tin Pan Alley, African American, vernacular and art discourses was in jazz. As early as the 1930s, artists attempted to cultivate ideas of "symphonic jazz", taking it away from its perceived vernacular and black American roots. These developments succeeded in the respect that many people today no longer consider certain forms of jazz as popular music.) Its "progressive" features were replete with dissonance, atonality, and brash effects. Progressive jazz was most popularized by the bandleader Stan Kenton during the 1940s. Critics were initially wary of the idiom. Dizzy Gillespie wrote in his autobiography: "They tried to make Stan Kenton a 'white hope', called modern jazz and my music 'progressive', then tried to tell me I played 'progressive' music. I said, 'You're full of shit!' 'Stan Kenton? There ain't nothing in my music that's cold, cold like his."

Progressive big band is a style of big band or swing music that was made for listening, with denser, more modernist arrangements and more room to improvise. The online music guide AllMusic states that, along with Kenton, musicians like Gil Evans, Toshiko Akiyoshi, Cal Massey, Frank Foster, Carla Bley, George Gruntz, David Amram, Sun Ra, and Duke Ellington were major proponents of the style.

== Pop and rock ==
=== Definitions ===
"Progressive rock" is almost synonymous with "art rock"; the latter is more likely to have experimental or avant-garde influences. Although a unidirectional English "progressive" style emerged in the late 1960s, by 1967 progressive rock had come to constitute a diversity of loosely associated style codes. (Note: The term was also partly related to progressive politics, but those connotations were lost early in the 1970s.) With the arrival of a "progressive" label, the music was dubbed "progressive pop" before it was called "progressive rock". (Note: Starting in about 1967, "pop music" was increasingly used in opposition to the term "rock music", a division that gave generic significance to both terms.) "Progressive" referred to the wide range of attempts to break with the standard pop music formula. A number of additional factors contributed to the label—lyrics were more poetic, technology was harnessed for new sounds, music approached the condition of "art", the album format overtook singles, some harmonic language was imported from jazz and 19th-century classical music, and the studio, rather than the stage, became the focus of musical activity, which often involved creating music for listening, not dancing.

=== Background ===
Up until the mid 1960s, individual idiolects always operated within particular styles. What was so revolutionary about this post-hippie music that came to be called 'progressive' ... was that musicians acquired the facility to move between styles—the umbilical link between idiolect and style had been broken.

— Allan Moore

During the mid 1960s, pop music made repeated forays into new sounds, styles, and techniques that inspired public discourse among its listeners. The word "progressive" was frequently used, and it was thought that every song and single was to be a "progression" from the last. In 1966, the degree of social and artistic dialogue among rock musicians dramatically increased for bands such as the Beach Boys, the Beatles, and the Byrds who fused elements of composed (cultivated) music with the oral (vernacular) musical traditions of rock. Rock music started to take itself seriously, paralleling earlier attempts in jazz (as swing gave way to bop, a move which did not succeed with audiences). In this period, the popular song began signaling a new possible means of expression that went beyond the three-minute love song, leading to an intersection between the "underground" and the "establishment" for listening publics. (Note: Allan Moore writes; "It should be clear by now that, although this history appears to offer a roughly chronological succession of styles, there is no single, linear history to that thing we call popular song. [...] Sometimes it appears that there are only peripheries. Sometimes, audiences gravitate towards a centre. The most prominent period when this happened was in the early to mid 1960s when it seems that almost everyone, irrespective of age, class or cultural background, listened to the Beatles. But by 1970 this monolothic position had again broken down. Both the Edgar Broughton Band's 'Apache Dropout' and Edison Lighthouse's 'Love grows' were released in 1970 with strong Midlands/London connections, and both were audible on the same radio stations, but were operating according to very different aesthetics.") The Beach Boys' leader Brian Wilson is credited for setting a precedent that allowed bands and artists to enter a recording studio and act as their own producers.

The music was developed immediately following a brief period in the mid 1960s where creative authenticity among musical artists and consumer marketing coincided with each other. Before the progressive pop of the late 1960s, performers were typically unable to decide on the artistic content of their music. Assisted by the mid 1960s economic boom, record labels began investing in artists, giving them freedom to experiment, and offering them limited control over their content and marketing. (Note: This situation fell in disuse after the late 1970s and would not reemerge until the rise of Internet stars.) The growing student market serviced record labels with the word "progressive", being adopted as a marketing term to differentiate their product from "commercial" pop. Music critic Simon Reynolds writes that beginning with 1967, a divide would exist between "progressive" pop and "mass/chart" pop, a separation which was "also, broadly, one between boys and girls, middle-class and working-class". (Note: The new pop movement of the 1980s was an attempt to bridge this divide.) Before progressive/art rock became the most commercially successful British sound of the early 1970s, the 1960s psychedelic movement brought together art and commercialism, broaching the question of what it meant to be an artist in a mass medium. Progressive musicians thought that artistic status depended on personal autonomy, and so the strategy of "progressive" rock groups was to present themselves as performers and composers "above" normal pop practice. (Note: By 1970, a journalist at Melody Maker highlighted progressive pop as the "most fascinating and recent development" in popular music, writing that the music is "meant for a wide audience but which is intended to have more permanent value than the six weeks in the charts and the 'forget it' music of older pop forms".)

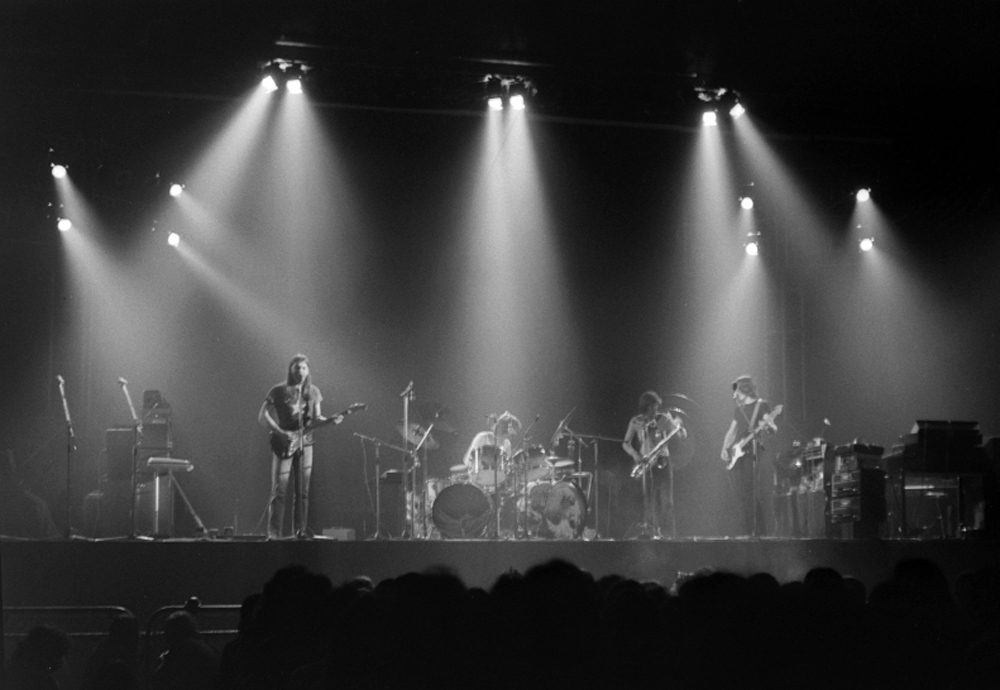
Pink Floyd performing The Dark Side of the Moon (1973), the best-selling album of the progressive rock period.

"Proto-prog" is a retrospective label for the first wave of progressive rock musicians. The musicians that approached this genre harnessed modern classical and other genres usually outside of traditional rock influences, longer and more complicated compositions, interconnected songs as medley, and studio composition. Progressive rock itself evolved from psychedelic/acid rock music, specifically a strain of classical/symphonic rock led by the Nice, Procol Harum, and the Moody Blues. (Note: Author Doyle Greene believes that the "proto-prog" label can stretch to "the later Beatles and Frank Zappa", Pink Floyd, Soft Machine, and United States of America. Edward Macan says that psychedelic bands like the Nice, the Moody Blues, and Pink Floyd represent a proto-progressive style and the first wave of English progressive rock.) Critics assumed King Crimson's debut album In the Court of the Crimson King (1969) to be the logical extension and development of late 1960s proto-progressive rock exemplified by the Moody Blues, Procol Harum, Pink Floyd, and the Beatles. According to Macan, the album may be the most influential to progressive rock for crystallizing the music of earlier "proto-progressive bands [...] into a distinctive, immediately recognizable style". He distinguishes 1970s "classic" prog from late 1960s proto-prog by the conscious rejection of psychedelic rock elements, which proto-progressive bands continued to incorporate.

Progressive rock and heavy metal merged into progressive metal in the 1980s. Early artists include Dream Theater and Symphony X. A subgenre of the progressive metal is the polyrhythmic djent. In the late 1990s, extreme metal subgenres were combined with progressive music. Progressive death metal (Opeth), progressive black metal (Ihsahn, Ne Obliviscaris) and progressive metalcore (Between the Buried and me).

=== Post-progressive ===
"Post-progressive" is a term invented to distinguish a type of rock music from the persistent "progressive rock" style associated with the 1970s. In the mid to late 1970s, progressive music was denigrated for its assumed pretentiousness, specifically the likes of Yes, Genesis, and Emerson, Lake & Palmer. According to musicologist John Covach, "by the early 1980s, progressive rock was thought to be all but dead as a style, an idea reinforced by the fact that some of the principal progressive groups has developed a more commercial sound. [...] What went out of the music of these now ex-progressive groups [...] was any significant evocation of art music." In the opinion of King Crimson's Robert Fripp, "progressive" music was an attitude, not a style. He believed that genuinely "progressive" music pushes stylistic and conceptual boundaries outwards through the appropriation of procedures from classical music or jazz, and that once "progressive rock" ceased to cover new ground – becoming a set of conventions to be repeated and imitated – the genre's premise had ceased to be "progressive".

A direct reaction to prog came in the form of the punk movement, which rejected classical traditions, virtuosity, and textural complexity. (Note: Groups such as the Sex Pistols, the Clash, and the Ramones adopted a "back-to-basics" stance, embracing the roots of rock music with direct sentiments, simple chord structures, and uncluttered arrangements. While punk rock appeared to be a negation of progressive rock, both styles of music derived from the idea of a cultural alternative.) Post-punk, which author Doyle Green characterizes "as a kind of 'progressive punk'", was played by bands like Talking Heads, Pere Ubu, Public Image Ltd, and Joy Division. It differs from punk rock by balancing punk's energy and skepticism with a re-engagement with an art school consciousness, Dadaist experimentalism, and atmospheric, ambient soundscapes. It was also majorly influenced from world music, especially African and Asian traditions. In the same period, new wave music was more sophisticated in production terms than some contemporaneous progressive music, but was largely perceived as simplistic, and thus had little overt appeal to art music or art-music practice. Musicologist Bill Martin writes; "[Talking] Heads created a kind of new-wave music that was the perfect synthesis of punk urgency and attitude and progressive-rock sophistication and creativity. A good deal of the more interesting rock since that time is clearly 'post-Talking Heads' music, but this means that it is post-progressive rock as well."

== Soul and funk ==
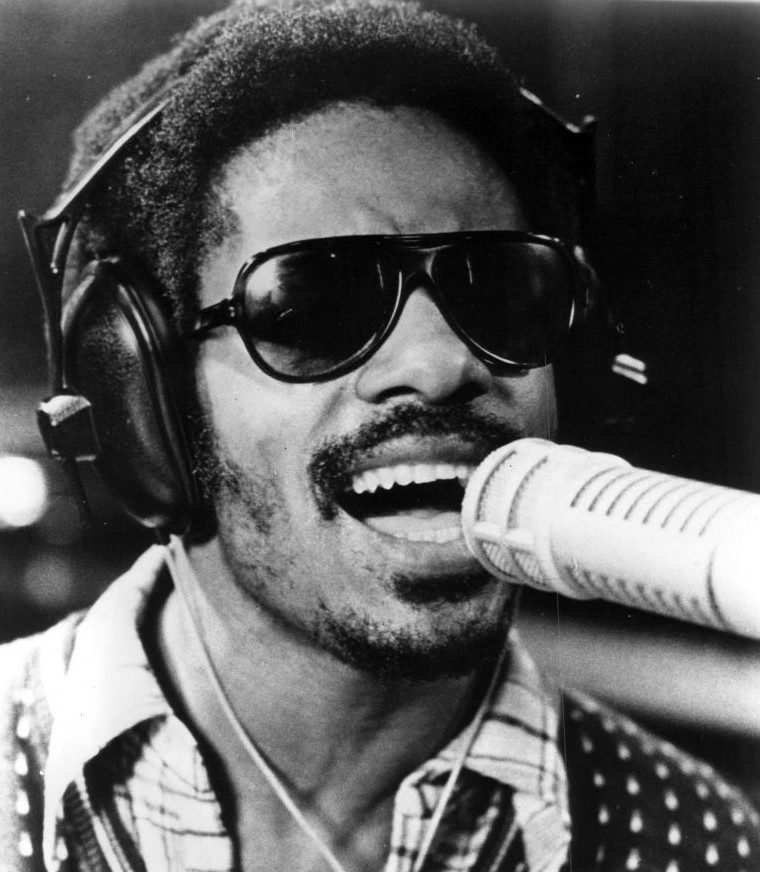
Stevie Wonder, who released a series of prog-soul albums in the 1970s

"Progressive soul" is used by Martin to refer to a musical development in which many African-American recording artists by the 1970s were creating music in a manner similar to progressive rock. This development inspired greater musical diversity and sophistication, ambitious lyricism, and conceptual album-oriented approach in black pop. Among the musicians at its forefront were Sly Stone, Stevie Wonder, Marvin Gaye, Curtis Mayfield, and George Clinton. According to Geoffrey Himes, "the short-lived progressive-soul movement flourished" from 1968 to 1973 and demonstrated "adventurous rock guitar, socially conscious lyrics and classic R&B melody". Similar to contemporaneous white prog musicians, progressive black musicians in the 1970s directed their creative control toward ideals of "individualism, artistic progression and writing for posterity", according to music academic Jay Keister, who notes that this pursuit sometimes conflicted with the collective political values of the Black Arts Movement.

Among the stylistic characteristics shared from progressive rock in black progressive music of this period were extended composition, diverse musical appropriation, and recording music intended for listening rather than dancing. Rather than the song-based extended compositions and suites of progressive white music, black counterparts in the 1970s generally unified an extended recording with an underlying rhythmic groove. Instrumental textures were altered in order to signify a change in section over an extended track's course. Examples of these characteristics include Funkadelic's "Wars of Armageddon" (1971) and Sun Ra's "Space Is the Place" (1973). Unlike the European art music appropriations used by white artists, progressive black music featured musical idioms from African and African-American music sources. However, some also borrowed elements from European American traditions to augment a song's lyrical idea. For example, Wonder added pleasant-sounding instrumental textures from a string section to "Village Ghetto Land" (1976), lending a sense of irony to an otherwise bleak critique of social ills in urban ghettos.

== Electronic ==
"Progressive electronic" is defined by AllMusic as a subgenre of new age music, and a style that "thrives in more unfamiliar territory" where the results are "often dictated by the technology itself". According to Allmusic, "rather than sampling or synthesizing acoustic sounds to electronically replicate them" producers of this music "tend to mutate the original timbres, sometimes to an unrecognizable state". Allmusic also states that "true artists in the genre also create their own sounds".

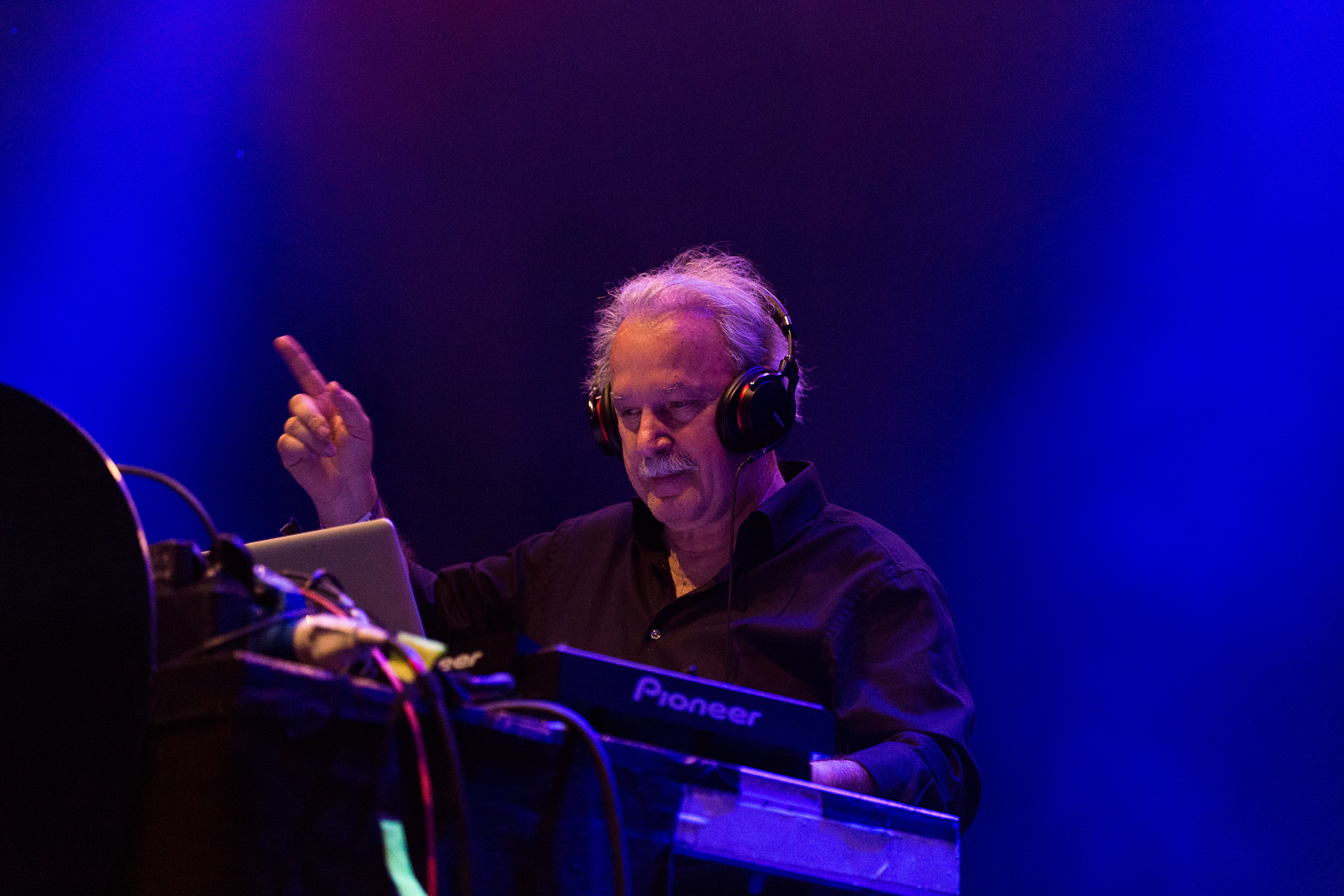
Giorgio Moroder performing in 2015

Tangerine Dream's 1974 album Phaedra, recorded with a Moog sequencer, was described as "an early masterpiece of progressive electronic music" by Rolling Stone. In house music, a desire to define precise stylistic strands and taste markets saw the interposition of prefixes like "progressive", "tribal", and "intelligent". According to disc jockey and producer Carl Craig, the term "progressive" was used in Detroit in the early 1980s in reference to Italian disco. The music was dubbed "progressive" because it drew upon the influence of Giorgio Moroder's Euro disco rather than the disco inspired by the symphonic Philadelphia sound. By 1993, progressive house and trance music had emerged in dance clubs. "Progressive house" was an English style of house distinguished by long tracks, big riffs, mild dub inflections, and multitiered percussion. According to Simon Reynolds, the "'progressive' seemed to signify not just its anti-cheese, nongirly credentials, but its severing of house's roots from gay black disco".

In the mid-1990s, the lowercase movement, a reductive approach towards new digital technologies, was spearheaded by a number of so-called "progressive electronica" artists.

=== Criticism ===
Reynolds posited in 2013 that "the truly progressive edge in electronic music involves doing things that can't be physically achieved by human beings manipulating instruments in real-time". He criticized terms like "progressive" and "intelligent", arguing that "it's usually a sign that it's gearing up the media game as a prequel to buying into traditional music industry structure of auteur-stars, concept albums, and long-term careers. Above all, it's a sign of impending musical debility, creeping self-importance, and the hemorrhaging away of fun." Reynolds also identifies links between progressive rock and other electronic music genres, and that "many post-rave genres bear an uncanny resemblance to progressive rock: conceptualism, auteur-geniuses, producers making music to impress other producers, [and] showboating virtuosity reborn as the 'science' of programming finesse".

== Hip-hop ==
"Progressive rap" has been used by academics to describe a certain type of hip-hop. Anthony B. Pinn regards it as a thematic subset alongside gangsta rap and "status rap", which expresses concerns about social status and mobility. While exploring existential crises and philosophical contradictions similar to gangsta rap, progressive rap, he says, "seeks to address these concerns without intracommunal aggression and in terms of political and cultural education, providing an interpretation of American society and a constructive agenda (e.g. self respect, knowledge, pride, and unity) for the uplift of Black America". He adds that works of the genre also utilize "a more overt dialogue with and interpretation of Black religiosity". In a corollary analysis, fellow academic Evelyn L. Parker says that progressive rap "seeks to transform systems of injustice by transforming the perspective of their victims" while demonstrating "the clear prophetic voice reflecting the rage caused by the dehumanizing injustices that African Americans experience".

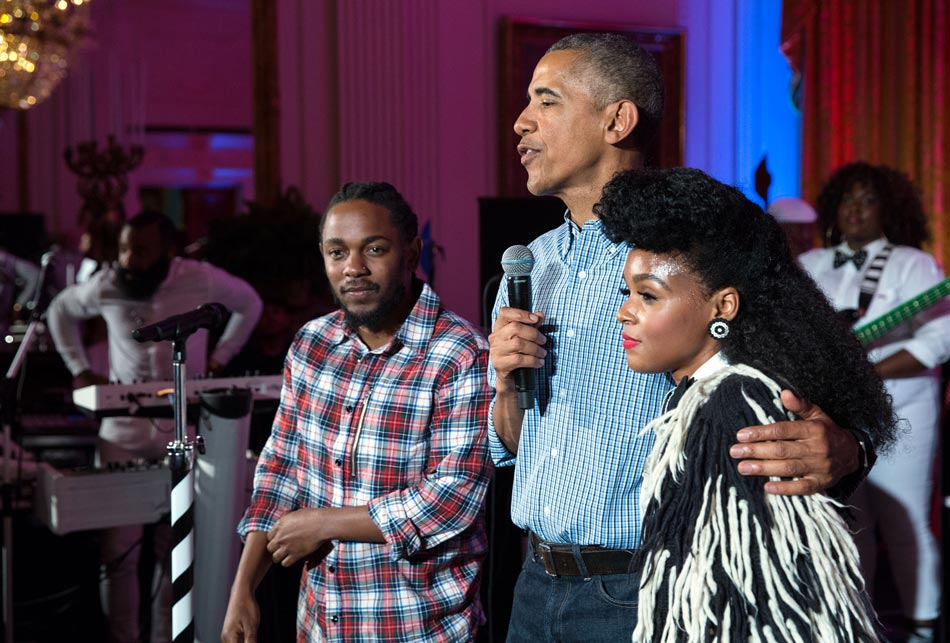
Progressive rapper Kendrick Lamar (left) alongside President Barack Obama (center) and prog-soul singer-songwriter Janelle Monáe, 2016

Early works of progressive rap such as the 1982 Grandmaster Flash and the Furious Five song "The Message" and the music of Public Enemy featured expressions of anger about chaotic urban life. Other formative groups such as De La Soul, A Tribe Called Quest, and Brand Nubian helped establish the genre's thematic mode. At the turn of the 2000s, Outkast and The Roots were among the few progressive-rap acts who "ruminated on hip-hop's post-millennial direction" and "produced records in an avant-garde vein purposely intended to evolve the music" while achieving commercial success, according to Miles Marshall Lewis. Kanye West, another influential artist in hip-hop's progressive tradition, achieved even greater success with his opening trilogy of education-themed albums in the 2000s. His 2010 album My Beautiful Dark Twisted Fantasy has also been associated with prog-rap due largely to its sampling of records from progressive rock as well as its ostentatious sensibilities.

The UK has also produced notable performers in progressive rap, including Gaika and Kojey Radical, who are credited by Vice in 2016 for working "deliberately outside the confines of grime and traditional UK hip hop to create genuinely progressive rap that rivals the US for creativity, urgency, and importance, and portrays a much broader black British music landscape than you hear on the radio". More recently, American studies and media scholar William Hoynes highlights the progressive rap of Kendrick Lamar as being in the tradition of African-American art and activism that operated "both inside and outside of the mainstream to advance a counterculture that opposes the racist stereotypes being propagated in white-owned media and culture".
