= Progressive rock =

Genre of rock music

- Other names: Art rock; classical rock; prog; prog rock; symphonic rock
- Stylistic origins: Rock; psychedelia; progressive music; jazz; folk; classical
- Cultural origins: Mid to late 1960s, United States and United Kingdom
- Derivative forms: Krautrock; new-age music; occult rock; post-rock; symphonic pop; synth-pop

Subgenres
- Canterbury scene; neo-prog; Rock in Opposition

Fusion genres
- Avant-prog; progressive metal; progressive soul

Other topics
- Alternative rock; arena rock; art music; concept album; experimental rock; folk rock; hard rock; new wave; post-progressive; brutal prog; new musick; post-punk; progressive country; progressive folk; Progressive metalcore; progressive pop; Progressive rap; proto-prog; recording studio as an instrument; rock opera; space rock

Progressive rock (shortened to prog rock or simply prog) is a broad genre of rock music that primarily developed in the United States and United Kingdom through the mid- to late 1960s. Initially termed "progressive pop", the style emerged from psychedelic bands who abandoned standard pop or rock traditions in favour of instrumental and compositional techniques more commonly associated with jazz, folk, or classical music, while retaining the instrumentation typical of rock music. Additional elements contributed to its "progressive" label: lyrics were more poetic, technology was harnessed for new sounds, music approached the condition of "art", and the studio, rather than the stage, became the focus of musical activity, which often involved creating music for listening rather than dancing.

Progressive rock includes a fusion of styles, approaches and genres, and tends to be diverse and eclectic. Progressive rock is often associated with long solos, extended pieces, fantastical lyrics, grandiose stage sets and costumes, and an obsessive dedication to technical skill and virtuosity. While the genre is often cited for its merging of high culture and low culture, few artists incorporated Western classical themes in their work to a significant degree, with only a minority of groups (Emerson, Lake & Palmer, Renaissance, Ekseption, etc.) directly emulating or referencing classical music.

In the early to mid-1970s, progressive rock groups such as Pink Floyd and Yes experienced great worldwide success; in the late 1970s, it declined in popularity, and has never fully recovered. Conventional wisdom holds that the rise of punk rock caused this, but several more factors contributed to the decline. Music critics, who often labelled the style of progressive rock as "pretentious" and the sounds as "pompous" and "overblown", tended to be hostile towards the genre or to completely ignore it. After the late 1970s, progressive rock fragmented into numerous forms. Some bands achieved commercial success well into the 1980s (albeit with changed lineups and more compact song structures) or crossed into symphonic pop, arena rock, or new wave.

Early groups who exhibited progressive features are retroactively described as "proto-prog". The Canterbury scene, originating in the late 1960s, denotes a subset of progressive rock bands who emphasised the use of wind instruments, complex chord changes and long improvisations. Space rock emerged in the late 1960s, fusing progressive rock with psychedelia and electronic music. Elsewhere in Europe, specifically West Germany, Krautrock emerged in the late 1960s, evolving from space rock, favoring repetition and electronic experimentation over traditional symphonic conventions and influenced later post-punk and electronic groups. Rock in Opposition, from the late 1970s, was more avant-garde, and when combined with the Canterbury style, created avant-prog. In the 1980s, a new subgenre, neo-prog, enjoyed some commercial success, although it was also accused of being derivative and lacking in innovation. Post-progressive draws upon newer developments in popular music and the avant-garde since the mid-1970s.

== Definition and characteristics ==
=== Scope and related terms ===
The Fourth Colour
The Fourth Colour, a progressive rock song by King Gizzard and the Lizard Wizard.

The term "progressive rock" is related to and sometimes considered synonymous with "art rock", "classical rock" (not to be confused with classic rock), and "symphonic rock". Historically, "art rock" has been used to describe at least two related, but distinct, types of rock music. The first is progressive rock as it is generally understood, while the second usage refers to experimental rock groups who rejected psychedelia and the hippie counterculture in favour of a modernist, avant-garde approach. (Note: In the rock music of the 1970s, the "art" descriptor was generally understood to mean "aggressively avant-garde" or "pretentiously progressive".) Similarities between the two terms are that they both describe a mostly British attempt to elevate rock music to new levels of artistic credibility. However, art rock is more likely to have experimental or avant-garde influences. "Prog" was devised in the 1990s as a shorthand term, but later became a transferable adjective, also suggesting a wider palette than that drawn on by the most popular 1970s bands.

Progressive rock is varied and is based on fusions of styles, approaches, and genres, tapping into broader cultural resonances that connect to avant-garde art, classical music and folk music, performance and the moving image. Although a unidirectional English "progressive" style emerged in the late 1960s, by 1967, progressive rock had come to constitute a diversity of loosely associated style codes. When the "progressive" label arrived, the music was dubbed "progressive pop" before it was called "progressive rock", (Note: From about 1967, "pop music" was increasingly used in opposition to the term "rock music", a division that gave generic significance to both terms.) with the term "progressive" referring to the wide range of attempts to break with standard pop music formula. A number of additional factors contributed to the acquired "progressive" label: lyrics were more poetic; technology was harnessed for new sounds; music approached the condition of "art"; some harmonic language was imported from jazz and 19th-century classical music; the album format overtook singles; and the studio, rather than the stage, became the focus of musical activity, which often involved creating music for listening, not dancing.

One of the best ways to define progressive rock is that it is a heterogeneous and troublesome genre – a formulation that becomes clear the moment we leave behind characterizations based only on the most visible bands of the early to mid-1970s

— Paul Hegarty and Martin Halliwell

Critics of the genre often limit its scope to a stereotype of long solos, overlong albums, fantasy lyrics, grandiose stage sets and costumes, and an obsessive dedication to technical skill. While progressive rock is often cited for its merging of high culture and low culture, few artists incorporated literal classical themes in their work to any great degree, and only a handful of groups purposely emulated or referenced classical music. Writer Emily Robinson says that the narrowed definition of "progressive rock" was a measure against the term's loose application in the late 1960s, when it was "applied to everyone from Bob Dylan to the Rolling Stones". Debate over the genre's criterion continued to the 2010s, particularly on Internet forums dedicated to prog.

According to musicologists Paul Hegarty and Martin Halliwell, Bill Martin and Edward Macan authored major books about progressive rock while "effectively accept[ing] the characterization of progressive rock offered by its critics. ... they each do so largely unconsciously." Academic John S. Cotner contests Macan's view that progressive rock cannot exist without the continuous and overt assimilation of classical music into rock. Author Kevin Holm-Hudson agrees that "progressive rock is a style far more diverse than what is heard from its mainstream groups and what is implied by unsympathetic critics."

=== Relation to art and social theories ===
In early references to the music, "progressive" was partly related to progressive politics, but those connotations were lost during the 1970s. On "progressive music", Holm-Hudson writes that it "moves continuously between explicit and implicit references to genres and strategies derived not only from European art music, but other cultural domains (such as East Indian, Celtic, folk, and African) and hence involves a continuous aesthetic movement between formalism and eclecticism". (Note: Formalism refers to a preoccupation with established external compositional systems, structural unity, and the autonomy of individual art works. Eclecticism, like formalism, connotes a predilection towards style synthesis, or integration. However, contrary to formalist tendencies, eclecticism foregrounds discontinuities between historical and contemporary styles and electronic media, sometimes referring simultaneously to vastly different musical genres, idioms and cultural codes. Examples include the Beatles' "Within You Without You" (1967) and Jimi Hendrix's 1969 version of "The Star-Spangled Banner".) Cotner also says that progressive rock incorporates both formal and eclectic elements, "It consists of a combination of factors – some of them intramusical ('within'), others extramusical or social ('without')."

One way of conceptualising rock and roll in relation to "progressive music" is that progressive music pushed the genre into greater complexity while retracing the roots of romantic and classical music. Sociologist Paul Willis believes: "We must never be in doubt that 'progressive' music followed rock 'n' roll, and that it could not have been any other way. We can see rock 'n' roll as a deconstruction and 'progressive' music as a reconstruction." Author Will Romano states that "rock itself can be interpreted as a progressive idea ... Ironically, and quite paradoxically, 'progressive rock', the classic era of the late 1960s through the mid- and late 1970s, introduces not only the explosive and exploratory sounds of technology ... but traditional music forms (classical and European folk) and (often) a pastiche compositional style and artificial constructs (concept albums) which suggests postmodernism."

=== Use of synthesizers ===
Synthesizers have a long history in the creation of progressive rock, beginning with the perhaps most well known early electronic instrument, the Theremin. Synthesizers rose in stature in the 1960s and 1970s as groups like Emerson, Lake & Palmer, Genesis and Yes incorporated synthesizers as part of their music.

== History ==
=== 1966–1970: Origins ===
==== Background, roots, and etymology ====
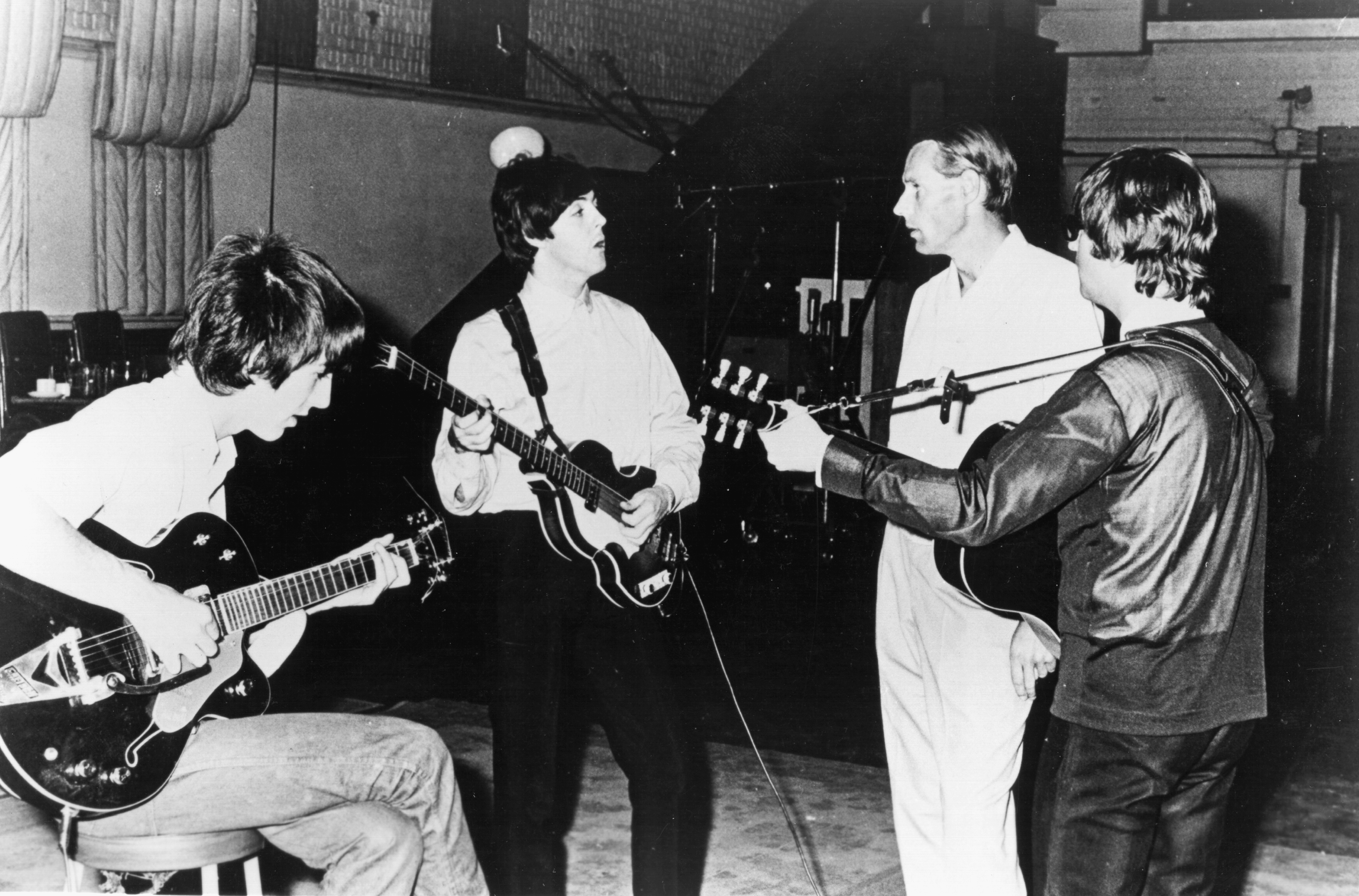
The Beatles rehearsing in the studio with producer George Martin, 1966

In 1966, the level of social and artistic correspondence among British and American rock musicians dramatically accelerated for bands like the Beatles, the Beach Boys and the Byrds who fused elements of cultivated music with the vernacular traditions of rock. Progressive rock, originating in the later 1960s, was inspired by progressive pop groups from the 1960s: those who combined rock and roll with various other music styles such as Indian ragas, oriental melodies and Gregorian chants, like the Beatles and the Yardbirds. The Beatles' Paul McCartney said in 1967 that the band "got a bit bored with 12 bars all the time, so we tried to get into something else. Then came Dylan, the Who, and the Beach Boys. ... We're all trying to do vaguely the same kind of thing". The term progressive here refers to an intentional break from the more standard, predictable, and popular conventions of rock music of the time.

Rock musicians started to take their music more seriously, paralleling earlier movements in jazz (such as how swing gave way to bop, a shift appealing to smaller but devoted audiences). In this period, the popular song began signalling a new possible means of expression that went beyond the three-minute love song, leading to an intersection between the "underground" and the "establishment" for listening publics. (Note: Allan Moore writes: "It should be clear by now that, although this history appears to offer a roughly chronological succession of styles, there is no single, linear history to that thing we call popular song. ... Sometimes it appears that there are only peripheries. Sometimes, audiences gravitate towards a centre. The most prominent period when this happened was in the early to mid 1960s when it seems that almost everyone, irrespective of age, class or cultural background, listened to the Beatles. But by 1970 this monolothic position had again broken down. Both the Edgar Broughton Band's 'Apache Dropout' and Edison Lighthouse's 'Love grows' were released in 1970 with strong Midlands/London connections, and both were audible on the same radio stations, but were operating according to very different aesthetics.")

Hegarty and Halliwell identify the Beatles, the Beach Boys, the Doors, the Pretty Things, the Zombies, the Byrds, the Grateful Dead and Pink Floyd "not merely as precursors of progressive rock but as essential developments of progressiveness in its early days". According to musicologist Walter Everett, the Beatles' "experimental timbres, rhythms, tonal structures, and poetic texts" on their albums Rubber Soul (1965) and Revolver (1966) "encouraged a legion of young bands that were to create progressive rock in the early 1970s". Dylan's poetry, the Mothers of Invention's album Freak Out! (1966) and the Beatles' Sgt. Pepper's Lonely Hearts Club Band (1967) were all important in progressive rock's development. The productions of Phil Spector were key influences, as they introduced the possibility of using the recording studio to create music that otherwise could never be achieved. Other influences include the Beach Boys' Pet Sounds (1966), which Brian Wilson intended as an answer to Rubber Soul and which in turn influenced the Beatles when they made Sgt. Pepper.

Dylan introduced a literary element to rock through his fascination with the Surrealists and the French Symbolists, and his immersion in the New York City art scene of the early 1960s. The trend of bands with names drawn from literature, such as the Doors, Steppenwolf and the Ides of March, were a further sign of rock music aligning itself with high culture. Dylan also led the way in blending rock with folk music styles. This was followed by folk rock groups such as the Byrds, who based their initial sound on that of the Beatles. In turn, the Byrds' vocal harmonies inspired those of Yes, and British folk rock bands like Fairport Convention, who emphasised instrumental virtuosity. Some of these artists, such as the Incredible String Band and Shirley and Dolly Collins, would prove influential through their use of instruments borrowed from world music and early music.

==== Pet Sounds and Sgt. Pepper ====
Many groups and musicians played important roles in this development process, but none more than the Beach Boys and the Beatles ... [They] brought expansions in harmony, instrumentation (and therefore timbre), duration, rhythm, and the use of recording technology. Of these elements, the first and last were the most important in clearing a pathway toward the development of progressive rock.

— Bill Martin

Pet Sounds and Sgt. Pepper, with their lyrical unity, extended structure, complexity, eclecticism, experimentalism, and influences derived from classical music forms, are largely viewed as beginnings in the progressive rock genre and as turning points wherein rock, which previously had been considered dance music, became music that was made for listening to. Between Pet Sounds and Sgt. Pepper, the Beach Boys released the single "Good Vibrations" (1966), dubbed a "pocket symphony" by Derek Taylor, the band's publicist. The song contained an eclectic array of exotic instruments and several disjunctive key and modal shifts. Scott Interrante of Popmatters wrote that its influence on progressive rock and the psychedelic movement "can't be overstated". Martin likened the song to the Beatles' "A Day in the Life" from Sgt. Pepper, in that they showcase "the same reasons why much progressive rock is difficult to dance to".

Although Sgt. Pepper was preceded by several albums that had begun to bridge the line between "disposable" pop and "serious" rock, it successfully gave an established "commercial" voice to an alternative youth culture and marked the point at which the LP record emerged as a creative format whose importance was equal to or greater than that of the single. (Note: LP sales first overtook those of singles in 1969.) Bill Bruford, a veteran of several progressive rock bands, said that Sgt. Pepper transformed both musicians' ideas of what was possible and audiences' ideas of what was acceptable in music. He believed that: "Without the Beatles, or someone else who had done what the Beatles did, it is fair to assume that there would have been no progressive rock." In the aftermath of Sgt. Pepper, magazines such as Melody Maker drew a sharp line between "pop" and "rock". Americans increasingly used the adjective "progressive" for groups like Jethro Tull, Family, East of Eden, Van der Graaf Generator and King Crimson.

==== Proto-prog and psychedelia ====
According to AllMusic: "Prog-rock began to emerge out of the British psychedelic scene in 1967, specifically a strain of classical/symphonic rock led by the Nice, Procol Harum, and the Moody Blues (Days of Future Passed)." The availability of newly affordable recording equipment coincided with the rise of a London underground scene at which the psychedelic drug LSD was commonly used. Pink Floyd and Soft Machine functioned as house bands at all-night events at locations such as Middle Earth and the UFO Club, where they experimented with sound textures and long-form songs. (Note: Beatles member John Lennon is known to have attended at least one such event, a happening called the 14 Hour Technicolor Dream. Paul McCartney was deeply connected to the underground through his involvement with the Indica Gallery.) Many psychedelic, folk rock and early progressive bands were aided by exposure from BBC Radio 1 DJ John Peel. Jimi Hendrix, who rose to prominence in the London scene and recorded with a band of English musicians, initiated the trend towards guitar virtuosity and eccentricity in rock music. The Scottish band 1-2-3, later renamed Clouds, were formed in 1966 and began performing at London clubs a year later. According to Mojo's George Knemeyer: "some claim [that they] had a vital influence on prog-rockers such as Yes, The Nice and Family."

Symphonic rock artists in the late 1960s had some chart success, including the singles "Nights in White Satin" (the Moody Blues, 1967) and "A Whiter Shade of Pale" (Procol Harum, 1967). The Moody Blues established the popularity of symphonic rock when they recorded Days of Future Passed together with the London Festival Orchestra. Classical influences sometimes took the form of pieces adapted from or inspired by classical works, such as Jeff Beck's Beck's Bolero, Love Sculpture's Farandole (Arlésienne Suite No 2. Movement 4) and parts of the Nice's Ars Longa Vita Brevis. The latter, along with such tracks as "Rondo" and "America", reflect a greater interest in music that is entirely instrumental. Sgt. Pepper's and Days both represent a growing tendency towards song cycles and suites made up of multiple movements.

Focus incorporated and articulated jazz-style chords, and irregular off-beat drumming into their later rock-based riffs, and several bands that included jazz-style horn sections appeared, including Blood, Sweat & Tears and Chicago. Of these, Martin highlights Chicago in particular for their experimentation with suites and extended compositions, such as the "Ballet for a Girl in Buchannon" on Chicago II. Jazz influences appeared in the music of British bands such as Traffic, Colosseum and If, together with Canterbury scene bands such as Soft Machine and Caravan. Canterbury scene bands emphasised the use of wind instruments, complex chord changes and long improvisations. Martin writes that in 1968, "full-blown progressive rock" was not yet in existence; however, albums were released by three bands who would later come to the forefront of the music: Jethro Tull, Caravan and Soft Machine.

"The Court of the Crimson King" (1969)
Macan writes that King Crimson's album "displays every element of the mature progressive rock genre ... [and] exerted a powerful extramusical influence on later progressive rock bands".

The term "progressive rock", which appeared in the liner notes of Caravan's 1968 self-titled debut LP, came to be applied to bands that used classical music techniques to expand the styles and concepts available to rock music. The Nice, the Moody Blues, Procol Harum and Pink Floyd all contained elements of what is now called progressive rock, but none represented as complete an example of the genre as several bands that formed soon after. Almost all of the genre's major bands, including Jethro Tull, King Crimson, Yes, Genesis, Van der Graaf Generator, ELP, Gentle Giant, Barclay James Harvest and Renaissance, released their debut albums during the years 1968–1970. Most of these were folk-rock albums that gave little indication of what the bands' mature sound would become, but King Crimson's In the Court of the Crimson King (1969) and Yes' self-titled debut album (1969) were early, fully formed examples of the genre. (Note: They are also generally credited as the first global standard-bearers of symphonic rock.)

=== 1970s–1980s ===
==== Peak years (1971–1976) ====
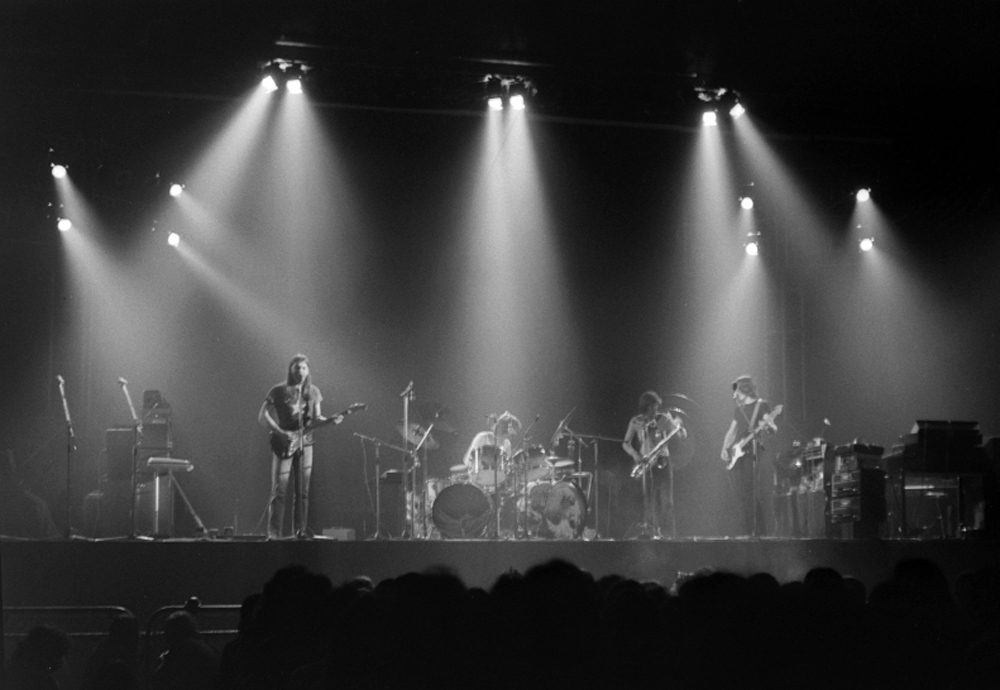
Pink Floyd performing The Dark Side of the Moon (1973), the best-selling album of the entire progressive rock period

Most of the genre's major bands released their most critically acclaimed albums during the years 1971–1976. The genre experienced a high degree of commercial success during the early 1970s. Between them, the bands Jethro Tull, ELP, the Moody Blues, Yes, and Pink Floyd had five albums that reached number one in the US charts, and sixteen that reached the top ten. (Note: Tull alone scored 11 gold albums and 5 platinum albums. Pink Floyd's 1970 album Atom Heart Mother reached the top spot on the UK charts. Their 1973 album The Dark Side of the Moon, which united their extended compositions with the more structured kind of composing employed when Syd Barrett was their songwriter, spent more than two years at the top of the charts and remained on the Billboard 200 album chart for fifteen years.) Mike Oldfield's Tubular Bells (1973), an excerpt of which was used as the theme for the film The Exorcist, sold 16 million copies.

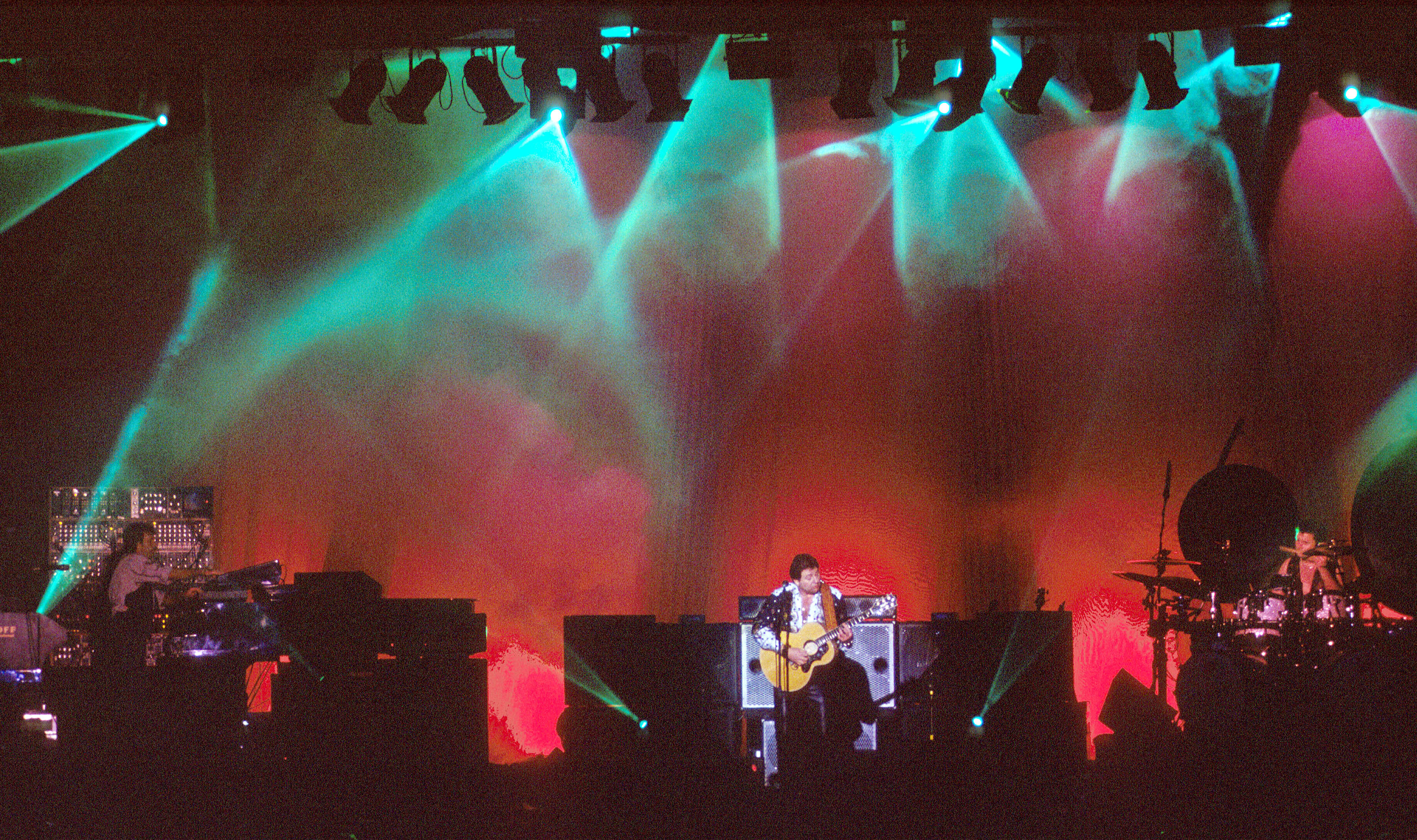
Emerson, Lake & Palmer were one of the most commercially successful progressive rock bands of the 1970s. They are seen here performing in 1992.

Progressive rock came to be appreciated overseas, but it mostly remained a European, and especially British, phenomenon. Few American bands engaged in it, and the purest representatives of the genre, such as Starcastle and Happy the Man, remained limited to their own geographic regions. This is at least in part due to music industry differences between the US and Great Britain. (Note: Radio airplay was less important in the UK, where popular music recordings had limited air-time on official radio stations (as opposed to on pirate radio) until the 1967 launch of BBC Radio 1. UK audiences were accustomed to hearing bands in clubs, and British bands could support themselves through touring. US audiences were first exposed to new music on the radio, and bands in the US required radio airplay for success. Radio stations were averse to progressive rock's longer-form compositions, which hampered advertising sales.) Cultural factors were also involved, as US musicians tended to come from a blues background, while Europeans tended to have a foundation in classical music.

North American progressive rock bands and artists often represented hybrid styles such as the complex arrangements of Todd Rundgren's Utopia and Rush, the eclectic psychedelia of Spirit, the hard rock of Captain Beyond, the Southern rock-tinged prog of Kansas, the jazz fusion of Frank Zappa and Return to Forever, and the eclectic fusion of the all-instrumental Dixie Dregs. British progressive rock acts had their greatest US success in the same geographic areas in which British heavy metal bands experienced their greatest popularity. The overlap in audiences led to the success of arena rock bands, such as Boston, Kansas, and Styx, who combined elements of the two styles.

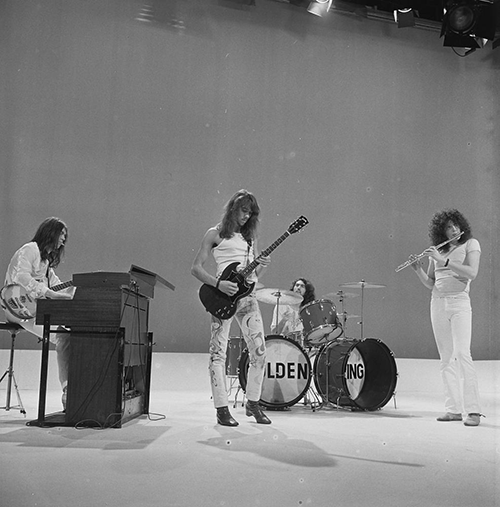
Golden Earring released a number of progressive rock albums from the late 1960s to the late 1970s, the most famous of which was the album Moontan, featuring the hit Radar Love.

Progressive rock achieved popularity in Continental Europe more quickly than it did in the US. Italy remained generally uninterested in rock music until the strong Italian progressive rock scene developed in the early 1970s. (Note: Van der Graaf Generator were much more popular there than in their own country. Genesis were hugely successful in Continental Europe at a time when they were still limited to a cult following in Britain and the US.) Progressive rock scene emerged in Yugoslavia in the late 1960s, dominating the Yugoslav rock scene until the late 1970s. Few of the European groups were successful outside of their own countries, with the exceptions of Dutch bands like Focus and Golden Earring who wrote English-language lyrics, and the Italians Le Orme and PFM, whose English lyrics were written by Peter Hammill and Peter Sinfield, respectively. Some European bands played in a style derivative of English bands. (Note: This can be heard in Triumvirat, an organ trio in the style of ELP; Ange and Celeste who have had a strong King Crimson influence. Others brought national elements to their style: Spain's Triana introduced flamenco elements, groups such as the Swedish Samla Mammas Manna drew from the folk music styles of their respective nations, and Italian bands such as Il Balletto di Bronzo, Rustichelli & Bordini, leaned towards an approach that was more overtly emotional than that of their British counterparts.)

In Germany, the "krautrock" scene is frequently cited as part of the progressive rock genre or an entirely distinct phenomenon. Krautrock bands such as Can, which included two members who had studied under Karlheinz Stockhausen, tended to be more strongly influenced by 20th-century classical music than the British progressive rock bands, whose musical vocabulary leaned more towards the Romantic era. Many of these groups were very influential even among bands that had little enthusiasm for the symphonic variety of progressive rock.

===== Avant-prog =====
Avant-prog (originally known as avant-garde progressive rock or experimental prog) is a subgenre of progressive rock that emerged in the 1970s. Originally pioneered by artists such as Frank Zappa and Captain Beefheart, the genre was further developed by the London Canterbury scene and later Rock in Opposition movement. The style drew influences from avant-garde music, modern classical, avant-garde jazz, experimental rock, jazz fusion and psychedelic rock. French band Magma later merged the style with orchestral and neoclassical music, which they coined "zeuhl".

===== Progressive soul =====
Concurrently, Black American popular musicians drew from progressive rock's conceptual album-oriented approach. This led to a progressive-soul movement in the 1970s that inspired a newfound sophisticated musicality and ambitious lyricism in black pop. Among these musicians were Sly Stone, Stevie Wonder, Marvin Gaye, Curtis Mayfield, and George Clinton. In discussing the development, Bill Martin cites 1970s albums by Wonder (Talking Book, Innervisions, Songs in the Key of Life), War (All Day Music, The World Is a Ghetto, War Live), and the Isley Brothers (3 + 3), while noting that the Who's progressive rock-influenced Who Are You (1978) also drew from the soul variant. Dominic Maxwell of The Times calls Wonder's mid-1970s albums "prog soul of the highest order, pushing the form yet always heartfelt, ambitious and listenable".

==== Decline and fragmentation ====
Political and social trends of the late 1970s shifted away from the early 1970s hippie attitudes that had led to the genre's development and popularity. The rise in punk cynicism made the utopian ideals expressed in progressive rock lyrics unfashionable. Virtuosity was rejected, as the expense of purchasing quality instruments and the time investment of learning to play them were seen as barriers to rock's energy and immediacy. There were also changes in the music industry, as record companies disappeared and merged into large media conglomerates. Promoting and developing experimental music was not part of the marketing strategy for these large corporations, who focused their attention on identifying and targeting profitable market niches.

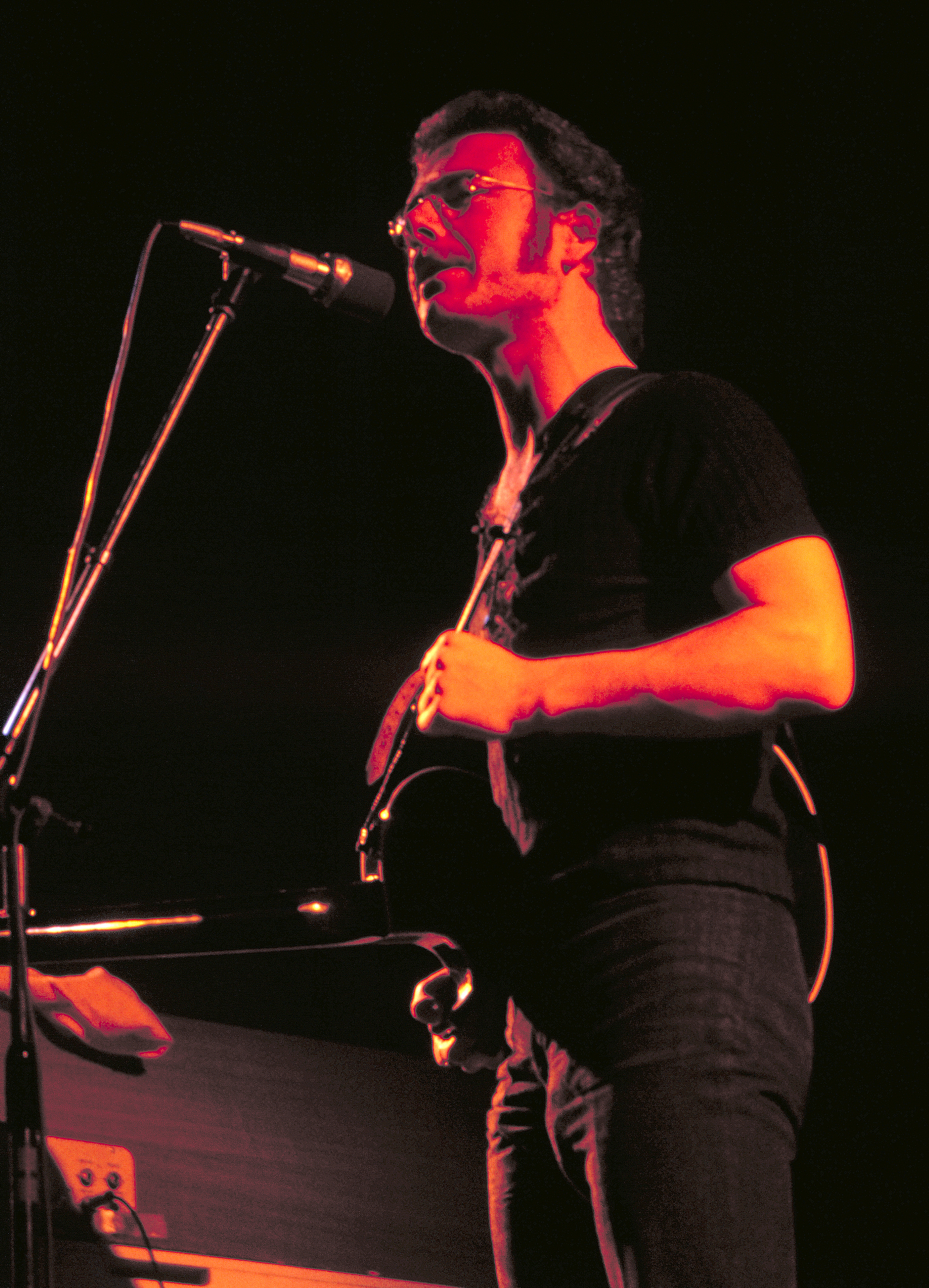
King Crimson's Robert Fripp believed that the prog movement had gone "tragically off course".

Four of progressive rock's most successful bands – King Crimson, Yes, ELP and Genesis – went on hiatus or experienced major personnel changes during the mid-1970s. Macan notes the September 1974 breakup of King Crimson as particularly significant, noting that Fripp (much later) referred to 1974 as the point when "all English bands in the genre should have ceased to exist". More of the major bands, including Van der Graaf Generator, Gentle Giant and U.K., dissolved between 1978 and 1980. Many bands had by the mid-1970s reached the limit of how far they could experiment in a rock context, and fans had wearied of the extended, epic compositions. The sounds of the Hammond, Minimoog and Mellotron had been thoroughly explored, and their use became clichéd. Those bands who continued to record often simplified their sound, and the genre fragmented from the late 1970s onwards. In Robert Fripp's opinion, once "progressive rock" ceased to cover new ground – becoming a set of conventions to be repeated and imitated – the genre's premise had ceased to be "progressive".

The era of record labels investing in their artists, giving them freedom to experiment and limited control over their content and marketing ended with the late 1970s. Corporate artists and repertoire staff exerted an increasing amount of control over the creative process that had previously belonged to the artists, and established acts were pressured to create music with simpler harmony and song structures and fewer changes in meter. A number of symphonic pop bands, such as Supertramp, 10cc, the Alan Parsons Project and the Electric Light Orchestra, brought the orchestral-style arrangements into a context that emphasised pop singles while allowing for occasional instances of exploration. Jethro Tull, Gentle Giant and Pink Floyd opted for a harder sound in the style of arena rock.

Few new progressive rock bands formed during this era, and those who did found that record labels were not interested in signing them. The short-lived supergroup U.K. was a notable exception since its members had established reputations; they produced two albums that were stylistically similar to previous artists and did little to advance the genre. Part of the genre's legacy in this period was its influence on other styles, as several European guitarists brought a progressive rock approach to heavy metal and laid the groundwork for progressive metal. Michael Schenker, of UFO; and Uli Jon Roth, who replaced Schenker in Scorpions, expanded the modal vocabulary available to guitarists. Roth studied classical music with the intent of using the guitar in the way that classical composers used the violin. Finally, the Dutch-born and classically trained Alex and Eddie Van Halen formed Van Halen, featuring ground-breaking whammy-bar, tapping and cross-picking guitar performances that influenced "shred" music in the 1980s.

===== Commercialisation =====
By the early 1980s, progressive rock was thought to be all but dead as a style, an idea reinforced by the fact that some of the principal progressive groups had developed a more commercial sound. ... What went out of the music of these now ex-progressive groups ... was any significant evocation of art music.

— John Covach

Some established artists moved towards music that was simpler and more commercially viable. Arena rock bands like Journey, Kansas, Styx, GTR, ELO and Foreigner either had begun as progressive rock bands or included members with strong ties to the genre. These groups retained some of the song complexity and orchestral-style arrangements, but they moved away from lyrical mysticism in favour of more conventional themes such as relationships. These radio-friendly groups have been called "prog lite". Genesis transformed into a successful pop act, the prog supergroup Asia (consisting of members of Yes, King Crimson, and ELP) scored a number-one album in 1982, and a re-formed Yes released the relatively mainstream 90125 (1983), which yielded their only US number-one single, "Owner of a Lonely Heart". One band who remained successful into the 1980s while maintaining a progressive approach was Pink Floyd, who released The Wall late in 1979. The album, which brought punk anger into progressive rock, was a huge success and was later filmed as Pink Floyd – The Wall. (Note: Pink Floyd were unable to repeat that combination of commercial and critical success, as their sole follow-up, The Final Cut, was several years in coming and was essentially a Roger Waters solo project that consisted largely of material that had been rejected for The Wall. The band later reunited without Waters and restored many of the progressive elements that had been downplayed in the band's late-1970s work. This version of the band was very popular, but critical opinion of their later albums is less favourable.)

==== Post-punk and post-progressive ====
Punk and progressive rock were not necessarily as opposed as is commonly believed. Both genres reject commercialism, and punk bands did see a need for musical advancement. (Note: Sex Pistols frontman Johnny Rotten famously wore a T-shirt that read "I hate Pink Floyd", but he expressed admiration for Van der Graaf Generator, Can, and many years later, Pink Floyd themselves. Brian Eno expressed a preference for the approach of the punk and new wave bands in New York, as he found them to be more experimental and less personality-based than the English bands.) Author Doyle Green noted that post-punk emerged as "a kind of 'progressive punk'". Post-punk artists rejected the high cultural references of 1960s rock artists like the Beatles and Bob Dylan as well as paradigms that defined rock as "progressive", "art", or "studio perfectionism". In contrast to punk rock, it balances punk's energy and skepticism with art school consciousness, Dadaist experimentalism, and atmospheric, ambient soundscapes. World music, especially African and Asian traditions, was also a major influence.

Progressive rock's impact was felt in the work of some post-punk artists, although they tended not to emulate classical rock or Canterbury groups but rather Roxy Music, King Crimson, and German krautrock bands, particularly Can, Neu!, and Faust as key inspirations. (Note: Julian Cope of the Teardrop Explodes wrote a history of the krautrock genre, Krautrocksampler.) Punishment of Luxury's music borrowed from both progressive and punk rock, whilst Alternative TV, who were fronted by the founder of the influential punk fanzine Sniffin' Glue Mark Perry, toured and released a split live album with Gong offshoot Here & Now.

The term "post-progressive" identifies progressive rock that returns to its original principles while dissociating from 1970s progressive rock styles, and may be located after 1978. Martin credits Roxy Music's Brian Eno as the sub-genre's most important catalyst, explaining that his 1973–77 output merged aspects of progressive rock with a prescient notion of new wave and punk. New wave, which surfaced around 1978–79 with some of the same attitudes and aesthetic as punk, was characterised by Martin as "progressive" multiplied by "punk". Bands in the genre tended to be less hostile towards progressive rock than the punks, and there were crossovers, such as Fripp and Eno's involvement with Talking Heads, and Yes' replacement of Rick Wakeman and Jon Anderson with the pop duo the Buggles.

When King Crimson reformed in 1981, they released an album, Discipline, which Macan says "inaugurated" the new post-progressive style. The new King Crimson line-up featured guitarist and vocalist Adrian Belew, who also collaborated with Talking Heads, playing live with the band and featuring on their 1980 album Remain in Light. According to Martin, Talking Heads also created "a kind of new-wave music that was the perfect synthesis of punk urgency and attitude and progressive-rock sophistication and creativity. A good deal of the more interesting rock since that time is clearly 'post-Talking Heads' music, but this means that it is post-progressive rock as well."

==== Neo-prog ====
A second wave of progressive rock bands appeared in the early 1980s and have since been categorised as a separate "neo-prog" subgenre. These largely keyboard-based bands played extended compositions with complex musical and lyrical structures. Several of these bands were signed by major record labels, including Marillion, IQ, Pendragon, Pallas and Twelfth Night. Most of the genre's major acts released debut albums between 1983 and 1985 and shared the same manager, Keith Goodwin, a publicist who had been instrumental in promoting progressive rock during the 1970s. The previous decade's bands had the advantage of appearing during a prominent countercultural movement that provided them with a large potential audience, but the neo-prog bands were limited to a relatively niche demographic and found it difficult to attract a following. Only Marillion and Saga experienced international success.

Neo-prog bands tended to use Peter Gabriel-era Genesis as their "principal model". They were also influenced by funk, hard rock and punk rock. The genre's most successful band, Marillion, suffered particularly from accusations of similarity to Genesis, although they used a different vocal style, incorporated more hard rock elements, and were very influenced by bands including Camel and Pink Floyd. Authors Paul Hegarty and Martin Halliwell have pointed out that the neo-prog bands were not so much plagiarising progressive rock as they were creating a new style from progressive rock elements, just as the bands of a decade before had created a new style from jazz and classical elements. Author Edward Macan counters by pointing out that these bands were at least partially motivated by a nostalgic desire to preserve a past style rather than a drive to innovate.

=== 1990s–2000s ===
==== Third wave ====
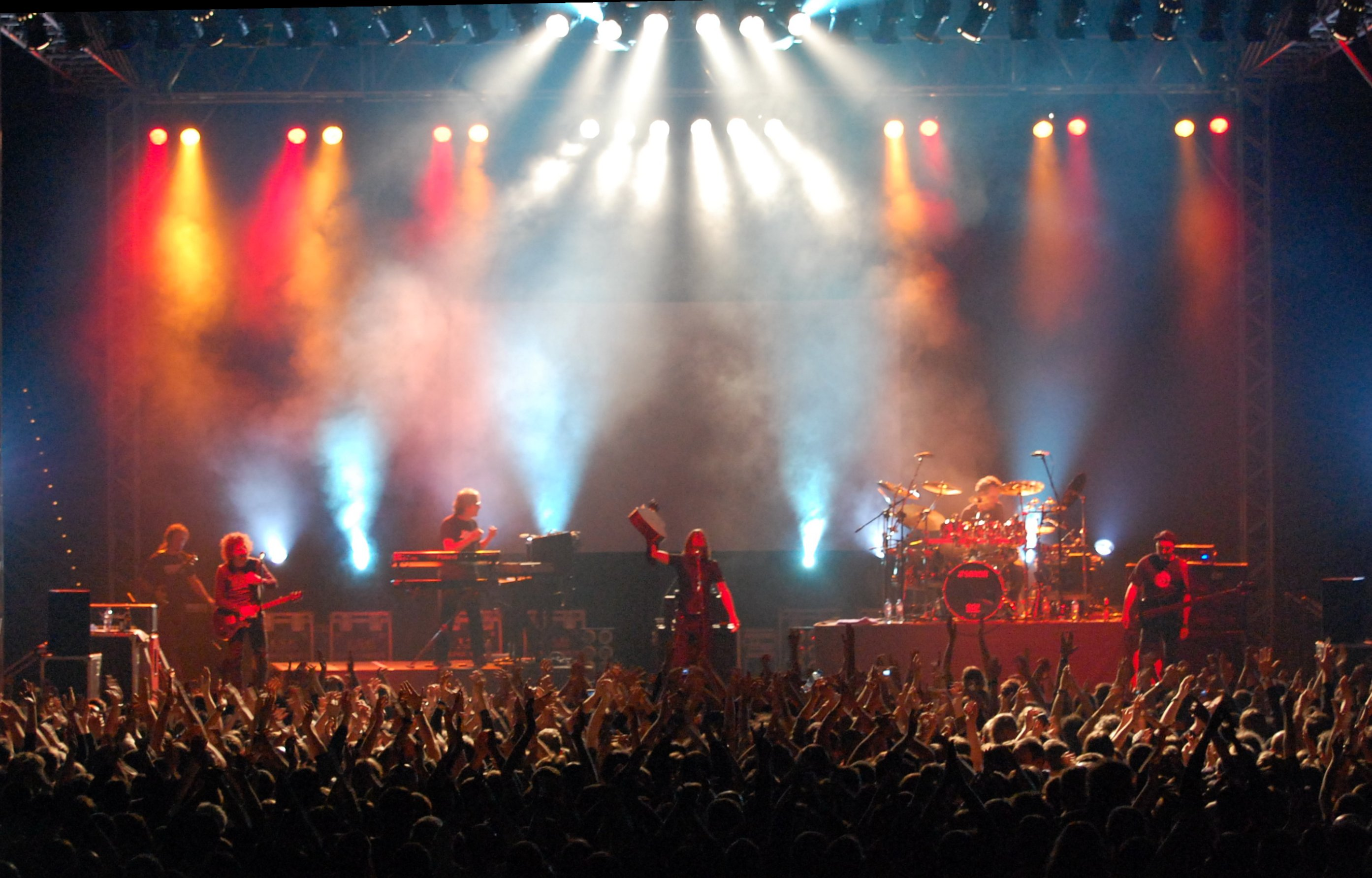
Porcupine Tree performing in 2007

A third wave of progressive rock bands, who can also be described as a second generation of neo-prog bands, emerged in the 1990s. The use of the term "progressive" to describe groups that follow in the style of bands from ten to twenty years earlier is somewhat controversial, as it has been seen as a contradiction of the spirit of experimentation and progress. These new bands were aided in part by the availability of personal computer-based recording studios, which reduced album production expenses, and the Internet, which made it easier for bands outside of the mainstream to reach widespread audiences. Record stores specialising in progressive rock appeared in large cities.

The shred music of the 1980s was a major influence on the progressive rock groups of the 1990s. Some of the newer bands, such as the Flower Kings, Spock's Beard and Glass Hammer, played a 1970s-style symphonic prog, but with an updated sound. A number of them began to explore the limits of the CD in the way that earlier groups had stretched the limits of the vinyl LP.

==== Progressive metal ====
"A Change of Seasons" by Dream Theater
A multipart suite by Dream Theater that combines elements of progressive rock and heavy metal

Progressive rock and heavy metal have similar timelines. Both emerged from late-1960s psychedelia to achieve great early-1970s success despite a lack of radio airplay and support from critics, then faded in the mid-to-late 1970s and experienced revivals in the early 1980s. Each genre experienced a fragmentation of styles at this time, and many metal bands from the new wave of British heavy metal – most notably Iron Maiden – onwards displayed progressive rock influences. Progressive metal reached a point of maturity with Queensrÿche's 1988 concept album Operation: Mindcrime, Voivod's 1989 Nothingface, which featured abstract lyrics and a King Crimson-like texture, and Dream Theater's 1992 Images and Words.

Progressive rock elements appear in other metal subgenres. Death metal's guttural vocals are sometimes used by bands who can be classified as progressive, such as Mastodon, Mudvayne and Opeth. Symphonic metal is an extension of the tendency towards orchestral passages in early progressive rock. Progressive rock has also served as a key inspiration for genres such as post-rock, post-metal and avant-garde metal, math rock, power metal and neo-classical metal.

==== New prog ====
New prog describes the wave of progressive rock bands in the 2000s who revived the genre. According to Entertainment Weekly's Evan Serpick, "success stories like System of a Down and up-and-comers like the Dillinger Escape Plan, Lightning Bolt, Coheed and Cambria, and the Mars Volta create incredibly complex and inventive music that sounds like a heavier, more aggressive version of '70s behemoths such as Led Zeppelin and King Crimson."

==== Wider influence ====
The turn of the millennium also saw the rise of a number of bands to mainstream success who, whilst not explicitly identifying as progressive rock, have incorporated influences from it and embraced an experimentalism and complexity in their music which has been regarded as being in keeping with the genre's traditions. Radiohead have been embraced by some progressive rock fans and musicians, with Rush's Geddy Lee declaring OK Computer as one of his favourite albums and arguing that they carried on the torch from bands like Yes and Genesis. Radiohead's drummer Philip Selway has cited King Crimson and Pink Floyd as influences, and the band's eclectic and experimental style has drawn on a range of sources, including jazz, electronic music, art rock, krautrock, post-rock and the work of Captain Beefheart.

Tool and King Crimson have acknowledged each other as influences and toured together. Other bands embracing progressive influences include Muse and Mansun, whose second album Six has been listed as a favourite British rock album of Porcupine Tree's Steven Wilson, who has collaborated and toured with former Mansun frontman Paul Draper. Ween's 1997 album The Mollusk has also been noted for its progressive rock influences, complete with Storm Thorgerson-designed cover art.

=== 2010s–2020s ===
The Progressive Music Awards were launched in 2012 by the British magazine Prog to honour the genre's established acts and to promote its newer bands.

In 2019, the Prog Report named Mike Portnoy and Neal Morse artists of the decade for 2010–2019. During this time, Portnoy released 40 albums, 24 of them with Morse, while Morse released an additional 5 albums of his own.

During the COVID-19 pandemic in 2020, the Prog Report launched a virtual concert, Prog From Home, bringing together many of the biggest artists active in the genre.

On April 3, 2022, "The Alien" won a Grammy Award for Best Metal Performance, giving Dream Theater their first Grammy.

== Festivals ==
Many prominent progressive rock bands got their initial exposure at large rock festivals that were held in Britain during the late 1960s and early 1970s. King Crimson made their first major appearance at the 1969 Hyde Park free concert, before a crowd estimated to be as large as 650,000, in support of the Rolling Stones. Emerson, Lake & Palmer debuted at the 1970 Isle of Wight Festival, at which Supertramp, Family and Jethro Tull also appeared. Jethro Tull were also present at the 1969 Newport Jazz Festival, the first year in which that festival invited rock bands to perform. Hawkwind appeared at many British festivals throughout the 1970s, although they sometimes showed up uninvited, set up a stage on the periphery of the event, and played for free.

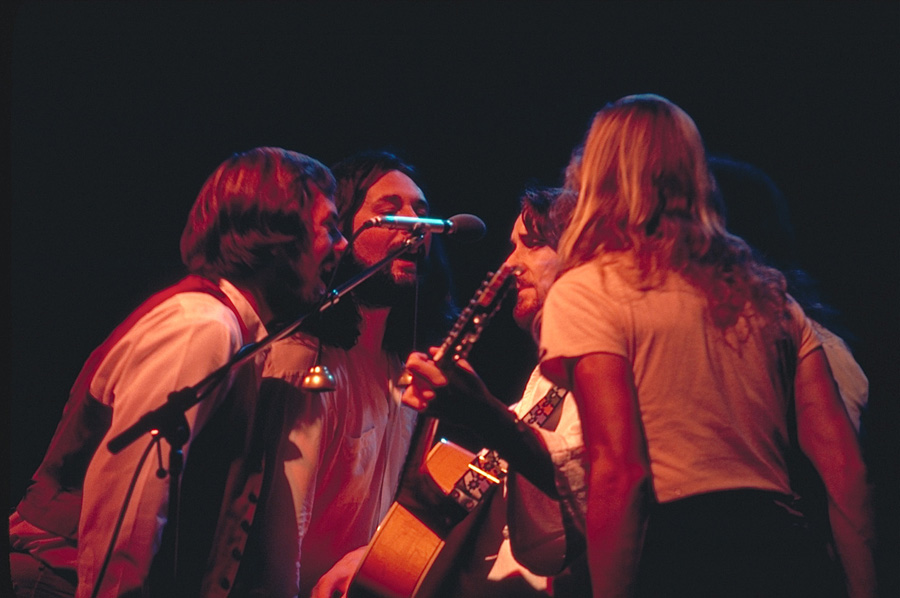
Supertramp performing in 1979

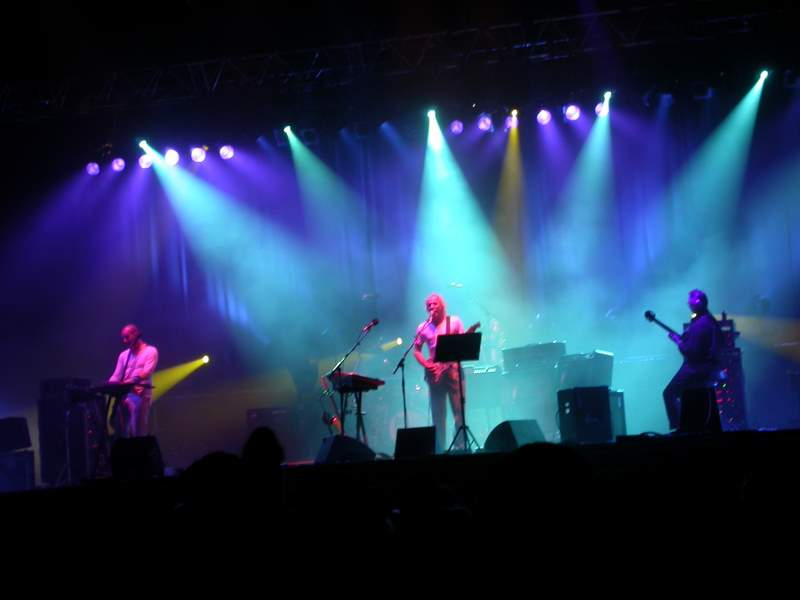
King Crimson performing at the Dour Festival, 2003

Renewed interest in the genre in the 1990s led to the development of progressive rock festivals. ProgFest, organised by Greg Walker and David Overstreet in 1993, was first held in UCLA's Royce Hall, and featured Sweden's Änglagård, the UK's IQ, Quill and Citadel. CalProg was held annually in Whittier, California during the early 2000s. The North East Art Rock Festival, or NEARfest, held its first event in 1999 in Bethlehem, Pennsylvania and held annual sold-out concerts until 2012's NEARfest Apocalypse, which featured headliners U.K. and Renaissance.

Other festivals include the annual ProgDay (the longest-running and only outdoor progressive music festival) in Chapel Hill, North Carolina; the annual Rites of Spring Festival (RoSfest) in Sarasota, Florida; The Rogue Independent Music Festival in Atlanta, Georgia; Baja Prog in Mexicali, Mexico; ProgPower USA in Atlanta, Georgia; ProgPower Europe in Baarlo, Netherlands; and ProgStock in Rahway, NJ, which held its first event in 2017. Another popular prog festival is Cruise to the Edge; 2026's line-up included Marillion, Steven Hackett, and Big Big Train.

== Reception ==
The genre has received both critical acclaim and criticism throughout the years. Progressive rock has been described as parallel to the classical music of Igor Stravinsky and Béla Bartók. This desire to expand the boundaries of rock, combined with some musicians' dismissiveness toward mainstream rock and pop, dismayed critics and led to accusations of elitism. Its intellectual, fantastic and apolitical lyrics, and shunning of rock's blues roots, were abandonments of the very things that many critics valued in rock music. Progressive rock also represented the maturation of rock as a genre, but there was an opinion among critics that rock was and should remain fundamentally tied to adolescence, so rock and maturity were mutually exclusive. Criticisms over the complexity of their music provoked some bands to create music that was even more complex. (Note: Yes' Tales from Topographic Oceans and "The Gates of Delirium" were both responses to such criticisms. Jethro Tull's Thick As a Brick, a self-satirising concept album that consisted of a single 45-minute track, arose from the band's disagreement with the labelling of their previous Aqualung as a concept album.) BBC radio DJ John Peel, who was one of the first people to play progressive rock on British radio, later said "the one distinguishing feature about early-70s progressive rock was that it didn't progress".

Most of the musicians involved were male, as was the case for most rock of the time, although Annie Haslam of Renaissance was a notable exception. Female singers were better represented in progressive folk bands, who displayed a broader range of vocal styles than the progressive rock bands with whom they frequently toured and shared band members.

British and European audiences typically followed concert hall behaviour protocols associated with classical music performances and were more reserved in their behaviour than audiences for other forms of rock. This confused musicians during US tours, as they found American audiences less attentive and more prone to outbursts during quiet passages.

These aspirations towards high culture reflect progressive rock's origins as a music created largely by upper- and middle-class, white-collar, college-educated males from Southern England. The music never reflected the concerns of or was embraced by working-class listeners, except in the US, where listeners appreciated the musicians' virtuosity. Progressive rock's exotic, literary topics were considered particularly irrelevant to British youth during the late 1970s, when the nation suffered from a poor economy and frequent strikes and shortages. Even King Crimson leader Robert Fripp dismissed progressive rock lyrics as "the philosophical meanderings of some English half-wit who is circumnavigating some inessential point of experience in his life". Bands whose darker lyrics avoided utopianism, such as King Crimson, Pink Floyd and Van der Graaf Generator, experienced less critical disfavour.

In 2002, Pink Floyd guitarist David Gilmour said, "I wasn't a big fan of most of what you'd call progressive rock. I'm like Groucho Marx: I don't want to belong to any club that would have me for a member." In 2014, Peter Gabriel remarked, "Despite prog probably being the most derided musical genre of all time there were—as today—a lot of extraordinary musicians trying to break down the barriers to reject the rules of music. It was genuinely pioneering at the time. We didn't always get it right, but when it did work we could move people and get some magic happening. I see it all as a very healthy part of growing up."

Ian Anderson, the frontman of Jethro Tull, commented:

I still like the original term that comes from 1969: progressive rock – but that was with a small "p" and a small "r". Prog Rock, on the other hand, has different connotations – of grandeur and pomposity [...] I think looking back on it that most of it was a pretty good experience for musicians and listeners alike. Some of it was a little bit overblown, but in the case of much of the music, it was absolutely spot on.

While music fans for years have declared progressive rock to be dead, the scene is still active with many sub-genres.

== See also ==
- British folk rock
- Free jazz
- List of musical works in unusual time signatures
- Minimal music
- Musique concrète
- Second Viennese School
- Serialism
- Third stream
- Timeline of progressive rock
- Category:Progressive rock record labels

== Sources ==
- Anderson, Ian (2008), BBC Prog Rock Britannia: An Observation in Three Movements (Televised interview), BBC Four
- Blackett, Matt (April 2001). "Uli Jon Roth". Guitar Player.
- Clark, William (25 August 2012), "Ian Crichton Talks About Saga, Guitars, Throwing Shapes and 20/20", Guitar International, archived from the original on 26 April 2013
- Cleveland, Barry (March 2005), "Prog Rock", Guitar Player
- Covach, John (2000), "Echolyn and American progressive rock", Contemporary Music Review, 18 (4): 13–61, doi:10.1080/07494460000640031at informaworld.com (subscription required)
- Fripp, Robert (1975), The Young Person's Guide to King Crimson (LP liner notes), EG Records, Ltd
- Gill, Chris (April 1995), "Prog gnosis: a new generation exhumes the list wisdom of the '70s", Guitar Player
- Greene, Doyle (2014). The Rock Cover Song: Culture, History, Politics. McFarland. ISBN 978-1-4766-1507-3.
- Gress, Jesse (May 1993). "Van Halen lesson: how Eddie rewrote the rock guitar rule book". Guitar Player.
- Gress, Jesse (June 2007). "10 things you gotta do to play like Uli Jon Roth". Guitar Player.
- Hogg, Brian (November 1994), "1-2-3 and the Birth of Prog", Mojo, BBC/Guinness Publishing
- Karnick, S. T. (August 2003), "Roll over Sibelius", The American Spectator, HighBeam Research., archived from the original on 31 March 2002 – via HighBeam Research
- Miles, Barry (1999), "An Interview with Ed Sanders-1 October 1968", The Review of Contemporary Fiction, 19 (1) (Spring 1999 ed.)
- O'Brien, Lucy (1999), Sounds of the Psychedelic Sixties, Britannica.com, archived from the original on 17 August 2014
- Tamm, Eric (1990), "Chapter Three: Fripp the Listener", Robert Fripp: From crimson king to crafty master (Progressive Ears ed.), Faber and Faber, ISBN 0-571-16289-4
- Weigel, David (14 August 2012b), Prog Spring: Entry 2: The rise of prog, music never meant for "the average person", Slate.com
- Weigel, David (17 August 2012e), Prog Spring: Entry 5: Prog Lives!, Slate.com

== Bibliography ==
- Bannister, Matthew (2007). White Boys, White Noise: Masculinities and 1980s Indie Guitar Rock. Ashgate Publishing, Ltd. ISBN 978-0-7546-8803-7. Archived from the original on 23 July 2016.
- Boone, Graeme M.; Covach, John, eds. (1997), Understanding Rock: Essays in Musical Analysis (Online ed.), New York: Oxford University Press, ISBN 0-19-510005-0
- Bowman, Durrell S. (2001), K. Holm-Hudson (ed.), "'Let Them All Make Their Own Music:' Individualism, Rush, and the Progressive/Hard Rock Alloy, 1976–77", Progressive Rock Reconsidered, Taylor & Francis, pp. 183–218, archived from the original on 7 November 2021
- Bruford, Bill (2012), Theo Cateforis (ed.), "Reflections on Progressive Rock", The Rock History Reader, Routledge
- Cateforis, Theo (2011), Are We Not New Wave? Modern Pop at the Turn of the 1980s, University of Michigan Press, ISBN 978-0-472-11555-6
- Cotner, John Sidney (2001), Archetypes of progressiveness in rock, ca. 1966–1973, University of Wisconsin-Madison
- Cotner, John S. (2000). "Music Theory and Progressive Rock Style Analysis". Reflections on American Music: The Twentieth Century and the New Millennium. Pendragon Press. ISBN 978-1-57647-070-1.
- Covach, John (1997), John Covach; Graeme M. Boone (eds.), "Progressive Rock, 'Close to the Edge,' and the Boundaries of Style", Understanding Rock: Essays in Musical Analysis, New York: Oxford University Press
- Curtis, Jim (1987), Rock Eras: Interpretations of Music and Society, 1954–1984, Bowling Green, OH: Bowling Green State University Popular Press
- Everett, Walter (1999). The Beatles as Musicians: Revolver Through the Anthology. New York, NY: Oxford University Press. ISBN 0-19-512941-5.
- Friedlander, Paul (1998), Rock and Roll: A Social History, Boulder, CO: Westview Press
- Haworth, John Trevor; Smith, Michael A. (1975). Work and Leisure: An Interdisciplinary Study in Theory, Education and Planning. Lepus Books. ISBN 9780860190097. Archived from the original on 23 February 2017.
- Hegarty, Paul; Halliwell, Martin (2011), Beyond and Before: Progressive Rock Since the 1960s, New York: The Continuum International Publishing Group, ISBN 978-0-8264-2332-0
- Hoard, Christian; Brackett, Nathan, eds. (2004). The New Rolling Stone Album Guide. Simon & Schuster. ISBN 9780743201698.
- Holm-Hudson, Kevin (2008). Genesis and The Lamb Lies Down on Broadway. Ashgate. ISBN 978-0-7546-6139-9.
- Holm-Hudson, Kevin, ed. (2013). Progressive Rock Reconsidered. Routledge. ISBN 978-1-135-71022-4. Archived from the original on 8 February 2017.
- Lucky, Jerry (2000), Progressive Rock, Burlington, Ontario: Collector's Guide Publishing, Inc.
- Macan, Edward (1997), Rocking the Classics: English Progressive Rock and the Counterculture, Oxford: Oxford University Press, ISBN 0-19-509887-0
- Martin, Bill (1996), Music of Yes: Structure and Vision in Progressive Rock, Chicago: Open Court
- Martin, Bill (1998), Listening to the Future: The Time of Progressive Rock, Chicago: Open Court, ISBN 0-8126-9368-X
- Martin, Bill (2002), Avant Rock: Experimental Music from the Beatles to Bjork, Chicago: Open Court
- Maske, Dan (2007), Progressive Rock Keyboard, Milwaukee, WI: Hal Leonard Corporation
- Moore, Allan (2004). Jethro Tull's Aqualung. Bloomsbury Publishing. ISBN 978-1-4411-1315-3. Archived from the original on 5 May 2016.
- Moore, Allan F. (2016). Song Means: Analysing and Interpreting Recorded Popular Song. Routledge. ISBN 978-1-317-05265-4. Archived from the original on 7 November 2021.* Sarig, Roni (1998), The Secret History of Rock: The Most Influential Bands You\'ve Never Heard, Crown Publishing Group
- Philo, Simon (2014). British Invasion: The Crosscurrents of Musical Influence. Rowman & Littlefield Publishers. ISBN 978-0-8108-8627-8. Archived from the original on 7 December 2019.
- Prendergast, Mark (2003). The Ambient Century: From Mahler to Moby – The Evolution of Sound in the Electronic Age. New York, NY: Bloomsbury. ISBN 1-58234-323-3.
- Priore, Domenic (2005). Smile: The Story of Brian Wilson's Lost Masterpiece. London: Sanctuary. ISBN 1860746276. Archived from the original on 13 March 2016.
- Prown, Pete; Newquist, Harvey P. (1997). Legends of Rock Guitar: The Essential Reference of Rock's Greatest Guitarists. Hal Leonard Corporation. ISBN 978-0-7935-4042-6. Archived from the original on 23 February 2017.
- Robinson, Emily (2017). The Language of Progressive Politics in Modern Britain. Palgrave Macmillan UK. ISBN 978-1-137-50664-1. Archived from the original on 17 February 2017.
- Rojek, Chris (2011). Pop Music, Pop Culture. Polity. ISBN 978-0-7456-4263-5. Archived from the original on 18 August 2020.
- Romano, Will (2010). Mountains Come Out of the Sky: The Illustrated History of Prog Rock. Milwaukee, WI: Backbeat Books. ISBN 978-0-87930-991-6. Archived from the original on 25 August 2016.
- Sweers, Britta (2004), Electric Folk: The Changing Face of English Traditional Music, New York: Oxford University Press
- Tamm, Eric (1995), Brian Eno: His Music and the Vertical Color of Sound, Da Capo Press, ISBN 0-306-80649-5, archived from the original on 5 December 2006
- Whiteley, Sheila (1992). The Space Between the Notes: Rock and the Counter-Culture. London: Routledge.
- Willis, Paul E. (2014). Profane Culture. Princeton University Press. ISBN 978-1-4008-6514-7. Archived from the original on 24 February 2017.
- Zoppo, Donato (2014). Prog: Una suite lunga mezzo secolo (in Italian). Arcana. ISBN 978-88-6231-639-2. Archived from the original on 19 August 2020.
