= Post-progressive =

Rock subgenre related to progressive rock

- Stylistic origins: Rock; avant-garde; progressive rock; ambient; folk rock; world; jazz; art rock; electronic; krautrock; minimal; psychedelic rock
- Cultural origins: c. 1978

Other topics
- Avant-rock; new wave; neo-prog; post-rock; progressive

Post-progressive is a type of rock music distinguished from vintage progressive rock styles, specifically 1970s prog. Post-progressive draws upon newer developments in popular music and the avant-garde since the mid-1970s. It especially draws from ethnic music and minimalism, elements which were new to rock music. It is different from neo-prog in that the latter pastiches 1970s prog, while "post-progressive" identifies progressive rock music that stems from sources other than prog.

== Definition ==
As Robert Fripp was all too aware, we cannot keep referring back to 1974, either negatively or positively, in order to find out what progressive rock later became. If we do refer back, then we should not use the classic phase of progressive rock as a fixed point to determine what was to follow.

— Paul Hegarty and Martin Halliwell

"Post-progressive" is rock music which distinguishes itself from the persistent style of 1970s prog, seeking a return to the genre's original principles. The "post" is meant to acknowledge the development of other forms of avant-garde and popular music since the mid 1970s; it does not reference "postmodernism". Purveyors explicitly embrace new computer technologies and sounds. Some post-progressive bands still draw upon selective aspects of vintage prog, even as they actively seek to distance themselves from the style. Particular influences on latter-20th century post-progressive artists include Jimi Hendrix, Frank Zappa, the Beatles, and King Crimson.

In the opinion of King Crimson's Robert Fripp, progressive music was an attitude, not a style. He believed that genuinely "progressive" music pushes stylistic and conceptual boundaries outwards through the appropriation of procedures from classical music or jazz, and that once "progressive rock" ceased to cover new ground – becoming a set of conventions to be repeated and imitated – the genre's premise had ceased to be "progressive". According to Paul Hegarty and Martin Halliwell, post-progressive did not directly derive from psychedelia, folk, and jazz as prog rock did, instead citing "explicit reference points of post-progressive music" lying within ambient, folk rock, forms of jazz, krautrock, the minimalism of New York art rock, and electronic music.

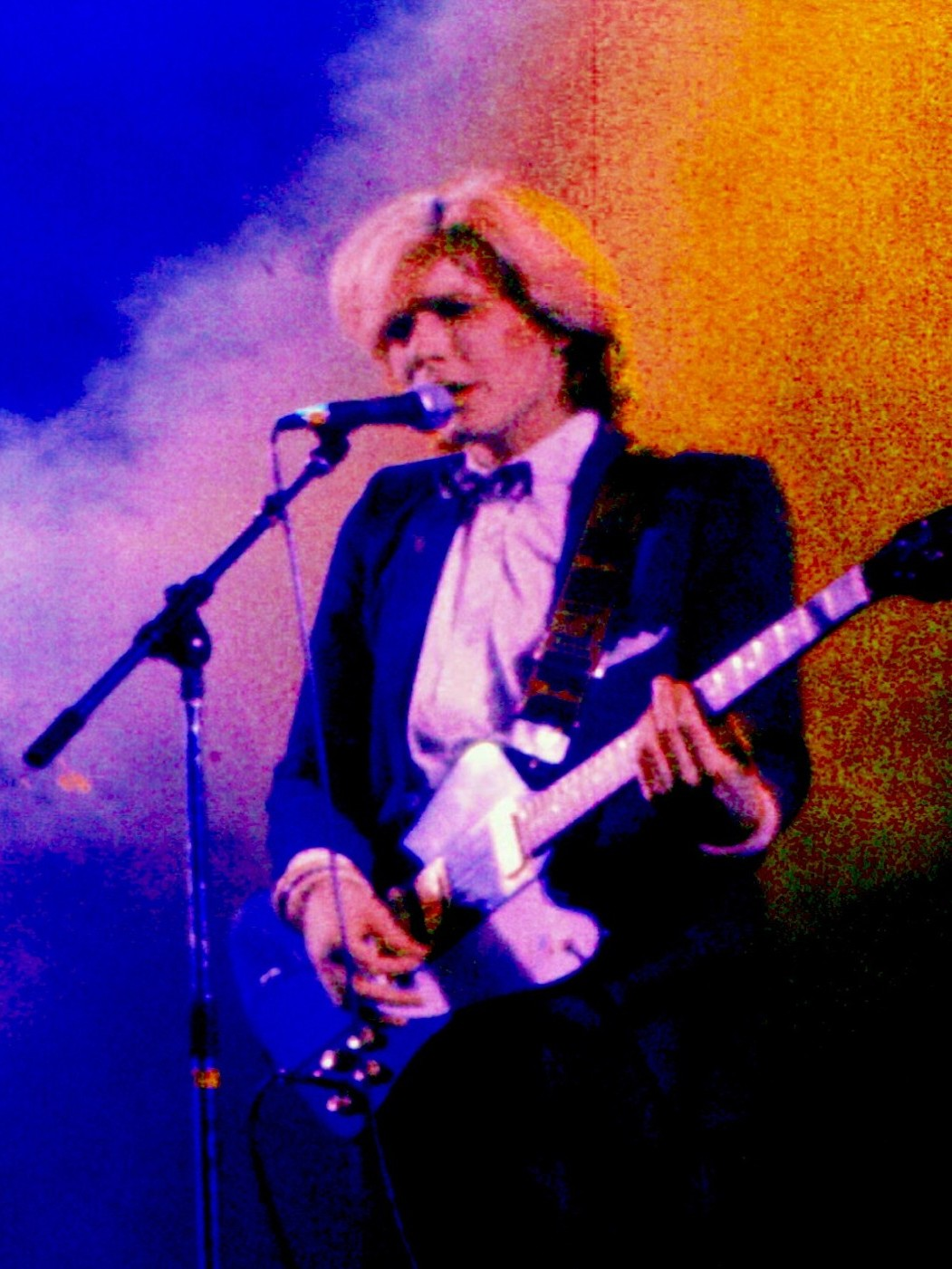
Kevin Holm-Hudson described David Sylvian (pictured in 1979) as an archetypal post-progressive artist.

Academic Kevin Holm-Hudson argues that "progressive rock is a style far more diverse than what is heard from its mainstream groups and what is implied by unsympathetic critics ... [one may] wonder where progressive rock 'ends' and becomes psychedelia, free jazz, experimental art music, or heavy metal." He categorizes post-progressive as a subgenre of progressive rock, whereas post-rock is a subgenre of alternative rock. Nosound's Giancarlo Erra believes that "post-prog"—deployed by the label Kscope—denotes a mixture of progressive rock and post-rock. Hegarty and Halliwell note: "Post-progressive identifies progressive rock that stems from sources other than progressive rock. This does not spread the net to include all avant-rock from the 1980s and 1990s ... post-progressive rock feeds a more explicit return to prog: in other words, a return that is not one. This trend is best exemplified by two British avant-rock acts of the 1980s and early 1990s: David Sylvian and Talk Talk."

== History ==
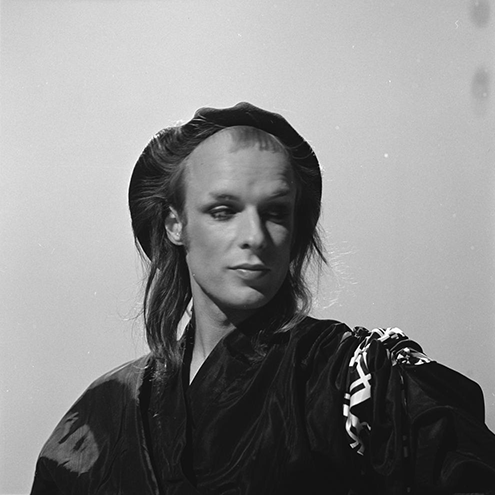
Bill Martin named the early solo work of Brian Eno (pictured in 1974) as the foremost catalyst in progressive rock's transition to post-progressive.

Post-progressive's beginning may be located after 1978. Author Bill Martin argues that Robert Fripp, Bill Laswell, and Peter Gabriel could all be considered transitional figures in post-progressive rock, crediting Brian Eno as the music's most important catalyst, and explaining that his 1973–1977 solo albums merged "warped aspects of progressive rock" with "a strange premonition of punk" and "the first approximations of new wave". Additionally, Talking Heads expanded new wave by combining the urgency of punk rock with the sophistication of progressive rock, as Martin writes: "A good deal of the more interesting rock since that time is clearly 'post-Talking Heads' music, but that means it is post-progressive rock as well." After the 1970s, the post-progressive style followed in the traditions of King Crimson's 1981 album Discipline, with its introduction of minimalism and ethnic musics, elements which were new to rock.

Hegarty and Halliwell credit Radiohead for creating "a new wave of progressiveness", explaining that "Radiohead's reintegration of rock into a post-progressive context ... they did not need to refer back to the sounds or styles of 1970s prog rock in order to make authentic progressive rock."

== Bibliography ==
- Bruford, Bill (2009). Bill Bruford: The Autobiography. Yes, King Crimson, Earthworks, and More. Jawbone Press. ISBN 978-1-906002-23-7.
- Cotner, John S. (2000). "Music Theory and Progressive Rock Style Analysis". Reflections on American Music: The Twentieth Century and the New Millennium. Pendragon Press. ISBN 978-1-57647-070-1.
- Hegarty, Paul; Halliwell, Martin (2011). Beyond and Before: Progressive Rock Since the 1960s. New York: The Continuum International Publishing Group. ISBN 978-0-8264-2332-0.
- Holm-Hudson, Kevin, ed. (2013). Progressive Rock Reconsidered. Routledge. ISBN 978-1-135-71022-4.
- Macan, Edward (1997). Rocking the Classics: English Progressive Rock and the Counterculture. Oxford University Press. ISBN 978-0-19-509887-7.
- Martin, Bill (1998). Listening to the Future: The Time of Progressive Rock. Chicago: Open Court. ISBN 0-8126-9368-X.
