= Proto-prog =

Early form of progressive rock

- Stylistic origins: Progressive rock; psychedelic rock
- Cultural origins: Mid-1960s

Other topics
- Progressive pop; progressive rock; post-progressive

Proto-prog (short for proto-progressive) is the earliest work associated with the first wave of progressive rock music, known then as "progressive pop". Such musicians were influenced by modern classical and other genres usually outside of traditional rock influences. They often employed longer and more complicated compositions, interconnected songs as medley, and studio composition. Some of the artists that were essential to the development of progressive rock, rather than just anticipating the movement, include the Beatles, the Beach Boys, the Doors, The Mothers of Invention, the Pretty Things, the Zombies, the Byrds, the Grateful Dead and Pink Floyd.

== Definition ==
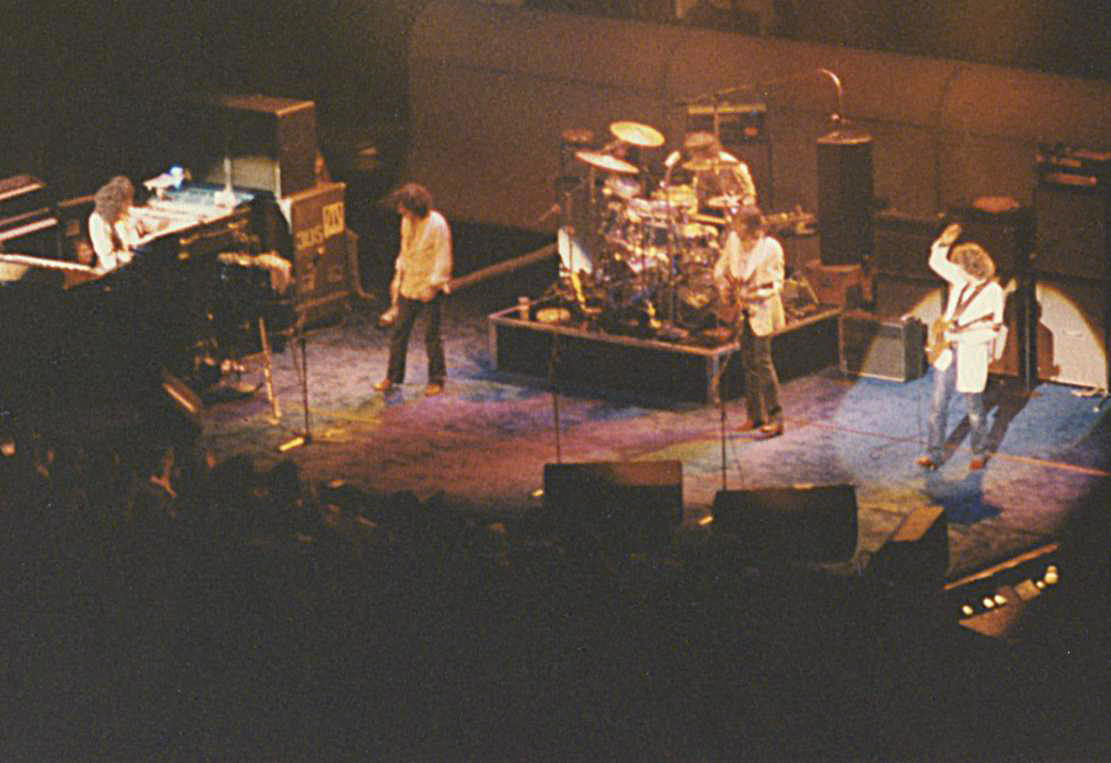
The Moody Blues, 1978

Although a unidirectional English "progressive" style emerged in the late 1960s, by 1967, progressive rock had come to constitute a diversity of loosely associated style codes. When the "progressive" label arrived, the music was dubbed "progressive pop" before it was called "progressive rock", (Note: From about 1967, "pop music" was increasingly used in opposition to the term "rock music", a division that gave generic significance to both terms.) with the term "progressive" referring to the wide range of attempts to break with standard pop music formula.

Music writer Doyle Greene believes that the "proto-prog" label can stretch to "the later Beatles and Frank Zappa", Pink Floyd, Soft Machine, and United States of America. Edward Macan, an author of progressive rock books, says that psychedelic bands like the Nice, the Moody Blues, and Pink Floyd represent a proto-progressive style and the first wave of English progressive rock. Conversely, academics Paul Hegarty and Martin Halliwell identify the Beatles, the Beach Boys, the Doors, the Pretty Things, the Zombies, the Byrds, the Grateful Dead and Pink Floyd "not merely as precursors of prog but as essential developments of progressiveness in its early days".

At the time, critics generally assumed King Crimson's album In the Court of the Crimson King (1969) to be the logical extension and development of late 1960s proto-progressive rock exemplified by the Moody Blues, Procol Harum, Pink Floyd, and the Beatles. According to Macan, the album may be the most influential to progressive rock for crystallizing the music of earlier "proto-progressive bands ... into a distinctive, immediately recognizable style". He distinguishes 1970s "classic" prog from late 1960s proto-prog by the conscious rejection of psychedelic rock elements, which proto-progressive bands continued to support.
