= Vernacular Music Center =

The Vernacular Music Center at Texas Tech University
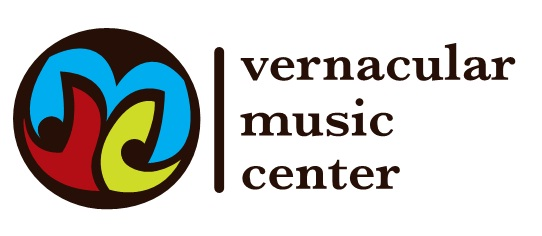

Location
- School of Music MS2033, Lubbock TX 79409 (United States) Lubbock, TX; United States; 33.580916°N 101.874512°W

Information
- Type: Public
- Motto: We live in the whole world of music. (paraphrasing Henry Cowell)
- Established: 2000
- Executive Director: Christopher J Smith
- Enrollment: Approximately 540
- Campus: Lubbock
- Website: http://vernacularmusiccenter.org

The Vernacular Music Center at Texas Tech University in Lubbock, Texas, is a center for in-depth and comparative research, study, teaching and advocacy on behalf of the world's vernacular musics and dance. The Center was founded at Texas Tech in the Fall of 2000 under Executive Director Dr Christopher J Smith. The VMC states that it "engages with folk music, traditional music and dance from around the world: vernacular idioms that are learned, taught, shared, and passed-on by ear and in the memory." The term "vernacular" is employed in its title in order to allude to "vernacular languages"—those languages used for commonplace communication—and in order to avoid potentially limiting terms such as "folk," "traditional," or "non-Western."

The VMC offers a range of programs, partnerships, scholarships, certificates and activities and events for students, educators and the public.

== History, naming and purpose ==
The Vernacular Music Center was founded at Texas Tech University in the winter of 2000 under Executive Director Dr Christopher J Smith. Professor Roger Landes of the TTU School of Music became Associate Director in 2014. The VMC is a center for in-depth and comparative research, study, teaching and advocacy on behalf of the world's vernacular musics and dance. The VMC states that it "engages with folk music, traditional music and dance from around the world: vernacular idioms that are learned, taught, shared, and passed-on by ear and in the memory."

The Center was founded on the model of the Indiana University Latin American Music Center and Early Music Institute and considers its peer institutions to include the Sibelius Academy (Helsinki), the Irish World Academy of Music and Dance (Limerick), and the Royal College of Music (Glasgow). The term "vernacular" is employed in its title in order to explicitly, directly allude to "vernacular languages"—those languages used for commonplace communication—and in order to avoid potentially limiting terms such as "folk," "traditional," or "non-Western."

The Center partners with campus and community groups on the local, regional, national, and international level. These include: Comhaltas Ceoltoiri Eireann, the Country Dance and Song Society, the Bay Area Country Dance Society, and others.

== Programs for students ==
For students: The VMC sponsors a range of activities—courses, ensembles, sponsored organizations, scholarships, study abroad, summer courses, and others.

The VMC's faculty and affiliate faculty offer a range of courses cross-listed under musicology, ethnomusicology, music theory, folklore, anthropology, and other fine arts & humanities disciplines.

The VMC sponsors The Tech Irish Set-Dancers (Participatory social dance from Ireland) Caprock Morris (Ritual dance from the Welsh Borders) Dancers with Soul: Texas Tech Hip-Hop Team, Mind freak!, The Caprock Ceili Band (Irish dance music) Caprock English Country Dancers (Social dance from Jane Austen, the BBC, and the Brontes), and The Playford Band (Instrumental dance music)

The VMC sponsors students engaged in vernacular music and dance studies. These include a scholarship program VMC Scholarship and an "Outreach Scholar" program

In addition to serving on the TTU Study Abroad Competitive Scholarship committee, VMC faculty also lead study abroad experiences in Ireland, England, Spain, Germany, Italy, and the Low Countries, with expanded program offerings in Kenya and Zimbabwe on the horizon.

The VMC also offers certificates in Early Music, World Music and Community Arts Entrepreneurship

== Programs for educators ==
The VMC provides a range of presentations, consultation, in-service professional development resources for Fine Arts specialists: locally, regionally, and across the country. VMC teaching staff and affiliates include expert pedagogues specializing in folk and traditional music and dance from: northern and eastern Europe; northern, western, and southern Africa; the Americas; the Indian subcontinent; and Polynesia, in addition to film music and a very wide range of popular and vernacular musics from the USA.

== Programs for the general public ==
The VMC welcomes participation by members of the community and general public across a wide range of its ensembles, sponsored groups, and activities, but has also developed and partnered with initiatives specifically designed to facilitate community participation.

== Events ==
The VMC offers a range of monthly, weekly, and annual events. Most are musical, vocal and dance performances. Almost all open to the general public.

== Funding structure ==
The VMC depends for funding (for guest artists, scholarships, young-professional training, event-production costs, ensemble travel, and all other programming) upon a network of supporters. All guest artist concerts and master-classes are free & open to the campus and community. Receipts from ticketed events are 100% allocated to support of VMC programming.

== Alumni ==
VMC alumni have gone on to graduate programs, internships, and professional appointments in a range of situations, including university programs, arts series, and the private sector. VMC alumni have matriculated into programs including: Claremont Graduate School, the University of Memphis, the University of Oregon, Indiana University, and others. VMC alumni have held internships at the Smithsonian Institution and the St Paul Chamber Orchestra, among others.

== Staff ==
Vernacular Music Center staff includes:

- Dr Christopher J Smith, executive director
- Professor Roger Landes, associate director
