= Progressive pop =

Pop music genre that emphasizes complexity and form

- Etymology: A "progression" from mid-20th century pop music formulas.
- Stylistic origins: Progressive rock; pop; proto-prog
- Cultural origins: Mid-1960s – 1970s
- Derivative forms: Hypnagogic pop; new pop

Other topics
- Art pop; art rock; avant-pop; alternative pop; experimental pop; indie pop; progressive rock; proto-prog; new wave; new musick; noise pop; orchestral pop

Progressive pop is pop music that attempts to break with the genre's standard formula, or an offshoot of the progressive rock genre that was commonly heard on AM radio in the 1970s and 1980s. It was originally termed for the early progressive rock of the 1960s. Some stylistic features of progressive pop include hooks and earworms, unorthodox or colorful instrumentation, changes in key and rhythm, experiments with larger forms, and unexpected, disruptive, or ironic treatments of past conventions.

The movement started as a byproduct of the mid-1960s economic boom, when record labels began investing in artists and allowing performers limited control over their own content and marketing. Groups who combined rock and roll with various other music styles such as Indian ragas and Asian-influenced melodies ultimately influenced the creation of progressive rock (or "prog"). When prog records began declining in sales, some artists returned to a more accessible sound that remained commercially appealing until the 1990s.

== Definition and scope ==
=== Characteristics ===
The term "progressive" refers to the wide range of attempts to break with standard pop music formulas through methods such as extended instrumentation, personalized lyrics, and individual improvisation. Treblezine's Ryan Reed acknowledged that the genre "sounds like an oxymoron" and is difficult to discern from other genres "without squinting". He explained that such "elusiveness is what makes 'prog-pop' a slippery term", although the genre is definable to a set of characteristics which follow:

... the material must be somewhat sophisticated, even highbrow, in a way 'mainstream' music is not—whether through left-field instrumentation, unusual time signatures or the general high caliber of musicianship on display. (There’s a decent chance somebody in the band went to music school, though that’s not a prerequisite.) But the pop component is equally essential: These songs have melodic lines, riffs, grooves and imagery that leeches on to your brain.

Similar to rock and roll, the tonal structure of progressive pop overthrows harmony as its basic organizing structure. However, unlike rock and roll, progressive pop inverts received conventions, playing with them ironically, disrupting them, or producing shadows of them in new and unexpected forms. Some stylistic features include changes in key and rhythm or experiments with larger forms. (Note: The Songwriting Sourebook (2003) states that key changes are more common to "arty" genres like progressive rock than they are to Top 40 pop songs, slow reggae tunes, dance music, R&B, punk, 12-bar blues, and 1950s rock and roll.) Electronic techniques such as echo, feedback, stereo, loudness, and distortion may be used to give the music the impression of space and lateral extension.

=== Early uses ===
"Progressive pop" was originally the usual term for progressive rock music. The latter genre was influenced by the "progressive" pop groups from the 1960s who combined rock and roll with various other music styles such as Indian ragas, oriental melodies, and Gregorian chants, like the Beatles and the Yardbirds. (Note: Among exemplar progressive pop music of this period, Paul Willis cites Frank Zappa's disuse of ordinary conventions and tone ("Uncle Meat)", Jimi Hendrix's "untempered" guitar, the Beatles' use of instrumentation as a type of rhythm ("Eleanor Rigby", "Penny Lane"), and Van Morrison's unusual, repeated cadences that make up the rhythm foundation for "Madame George".) The genre's initial premise involved popular music that was created with the intention of listening, not dancing, and opposed the influence of managers, agents, or record companies. In general, progressive music was produced by the performing artists themselves.

In December 1966, Melody Maker attempted to define the recent developments in pop. In this article, titled "Progressive Pop", Chris Welch categorised artists using terms previously associated with jazz; in the most advanced of these, "Avant-Garde", he placed the Beatles, Cream, Love, the Mothers of Invention, Pink Floyd and Soft Machine, while "Modern", the next category, comprised the Byrds, Donovan and the Small Faces. After the release of the Beatles' 1967 album Sgt. Pepper's Lonely Hearts Club Band, magazines such as Melody Maker drew a sharp line between "pop" and "rock". The only artists who remained "rock" would be those who were considered at the vanguard of compositional forms, far from "radio friendly" standards, as Americans increasingly used the adjective "progressive" for groups like Jethro Tull, Family, East of Eden, Van der Graaf Generator, and King Crimson.

In 1970, a Melody Maker journalist described progressive pop as music appealing to the masses, but less disposable than the "six weeks in the charts and the 'forget it' music of older pop forms." By the late 1970s, "progressive pop" was roughly synonymous with "rock music". Authors Don and Jeff Breithaupt define progressive pop in the 1970s and 1980s as a "leaner breed of pomp rock" that was derivative of the Beatles. Producer Alan Parsons, who worked as an engineer on the Beatles' album Abbey Road (1969), remembered that even though he considered some of his songs "pure pop", others continued to categorize his band (the Alan Parsons Project) under the "progressive rock" label. Parsons thought "progressive pop" was a better name, explaining that "what made [our music] progressive was the epic sound and the orchestration which very few people were doing that at the time."

== Evolution and popularity ==
=== 1960s: Origins ===
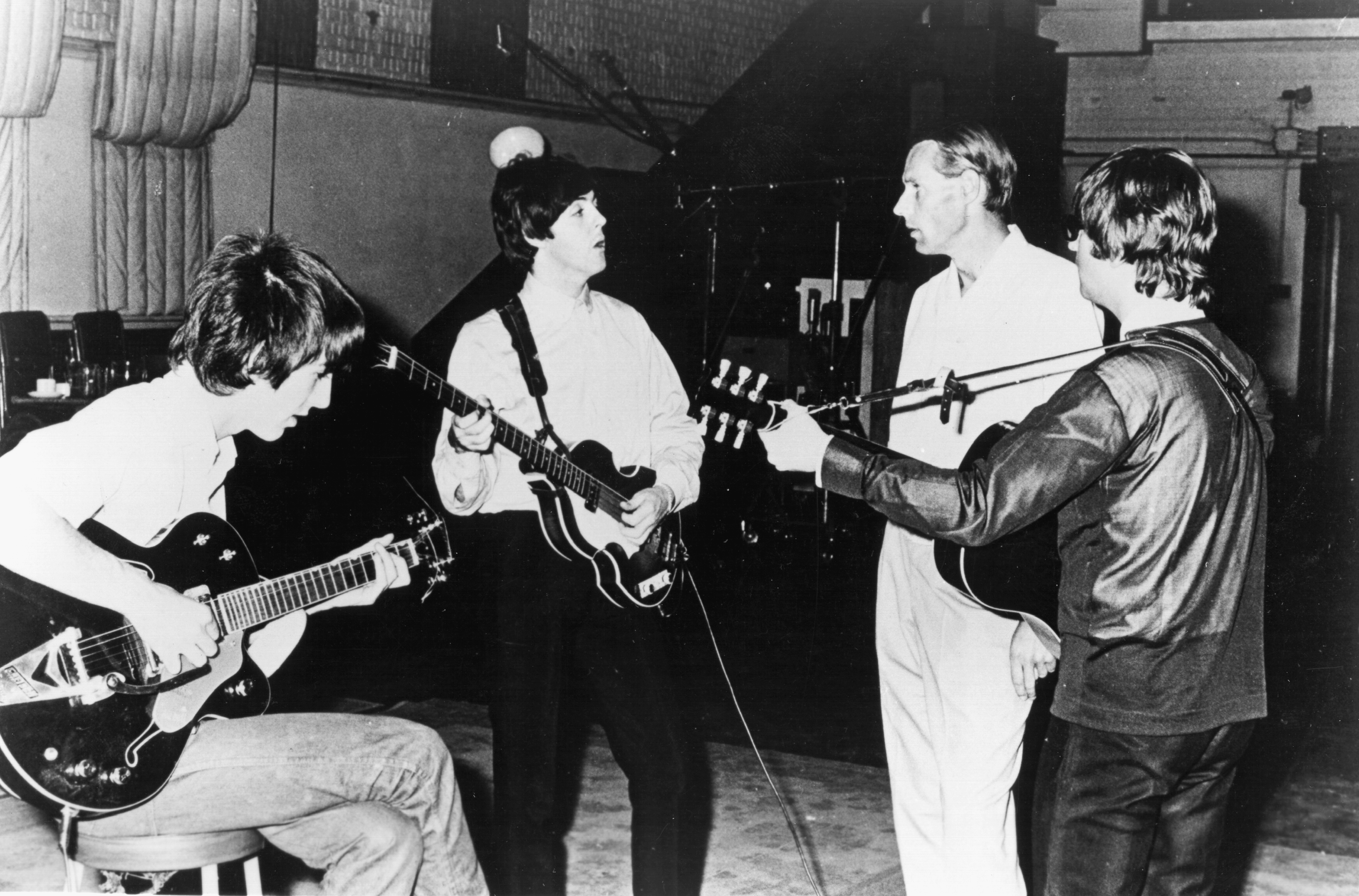
The Beatles working in the studio with their producer George Martin, circa 1964

During the mid 1960s, pop music made repeated forays into new sounds, styles, and techniques that inspired public discourse among its listeners. The word "progressive" was frequently used, and it was thought that every song and single was to be a "progression" from the last. (Note: In the 1960s, the majority of mainstream pop music fell in two categories: guitar, drum and bass groups or singers backed by a traditional orchestra. It was also common for producers, songwriters, and engineers to freely experiment with musical form, orchestration, unnatural reverb, and other sound effects. Some of the best known examples are Phil Spector's Wall of Sound and Joe Meek's use of homemade electronic sound effects for acts like the Tornados.) The Beach Boys and the Beatles were among the earliest progenitors of progressive pop via albums such as Pet Sounds and Sgt. Pepper's, respectively. Author Bill Martin recognises the bands as the most significant contributors to the development of progressive rock, transforming rock from dance music into music that was made for listening to. (Note: Music created with the intention of listening, not dancing, was also the aim of progressive pop.) Before the progressive pop of the late 1960s, performers were typically unable to decide on the artistic content of their music. The Beach Boys' leader Brian Wilson is credited for setting a precedent that allowed bands and artists to enter a recording studio and act as their own producers.

Citing a quantitative study of tempos in music from the era, musicologist Walter Everett identifies the Beatles' 1965 album Rubber Soul as a work that was "made more to be thought about than danced to", and an album that "began a far-reaching trend" in its slowing-down of the tempos typically used in pop and rock music. In mid-1966, the UK release of the Beach Boys' Pet Sounds was accompanied by advertisements in the local music press saying that it was "The Most Progressive Pop Album Ever!" Cleveland's Troy Smith believes that the album "established the group as forefathers of progressive pop, right from the beginning chords of 'Wouldn't It Be Nice', a Wall of Sound style single". (Note: In response to Pet Sounds' reputed acclaim, Melody Maker surveyed many pop musicians on whether they believed that the album was truly revolutionary or progressive. The author concluded that "the record's impact on artists and the men behind the artists has been considerable.") In October, Pet Sounds was followed by the psychedelic and elaborately arranged single "Good Vibrations". According to Reed, the song became the "most obvious starting point" in the genre.

The Beatles' Paul McCartney intimated in 1967: "we [the band] got a bit bored with 12 bars all the time, so we tried to get into something else. Then came [Bob] Dylan, the Who, and the Beach Boys. ... We're all trying to do vaguely the same kind of thing." In the opinion of author Simon Philo, the Beatles' progressive pop was exemplified in the double A-sided single "Strawberry Fields Forever" / "Penny Lane" (1967). In a further example of the reciprocal influences between themselves and the Beach Boys, the Beatles demonstrated "paradoxical lyrical content matched by music that was at once 'young' and 'old', rock and Tin Pan Alley, LSD and cocoa, progressive and nostalgic" – all features that were shared on Sgt. Pepper's. Musicologist Allan Moore writes: "At that time, Sgt. Pepper seemed to mark rock music's coming of age ... Now, of course, with jaded memories, we think of it as ushering in an era of pomposity, with varying degrees of seriousness ... The question after 1967 was whether 'progressive' pop/rock was to be trusted, because it was dealing with issues 'deeper' than simply interpersonal relationships. In the long run, the answer turned out to be 'no' (at least, that is, until a later generation of bands discovered the delight of pastiching the Beatles)."

Towards the end of the 1960s, progressive pop music was received with doubt and disinterest. The Who's Pete Townshend reflected that "a lot of psychedelic bullshit was going on", referring to "garbage" being promoted in the charts, and that many artists who were doing ambitious works were instantly being labelled "pretentious". He believed: "Anybody that was any good ... was more or less becoming insignificant again." In 1969, writer Nik Cohn reported that the pop music industry had been split "roughly eighty percent ugly and twenty percent idealist", with the eighty percent being "mainline pop" and the twenty percent being "progressive pop [developed to] an esoteric feel". He predicted that in ten years, the genre would be called by another name (possibly "electric music"), and that its relationship to pop music would be similar to the one between art movies and Hollywood. While progressive pop did not "shrink to a minority cult", as Cohn wrote one year later, "in England, I wasn't entirely wrong ... But, in America, I fluffed completely – the Woodstock nation has kept growing and, for all his seriousness and pretensions to poetry, someone like James Taylor has achieved the same mass appeal as earlier stars."

=== 1970s ===
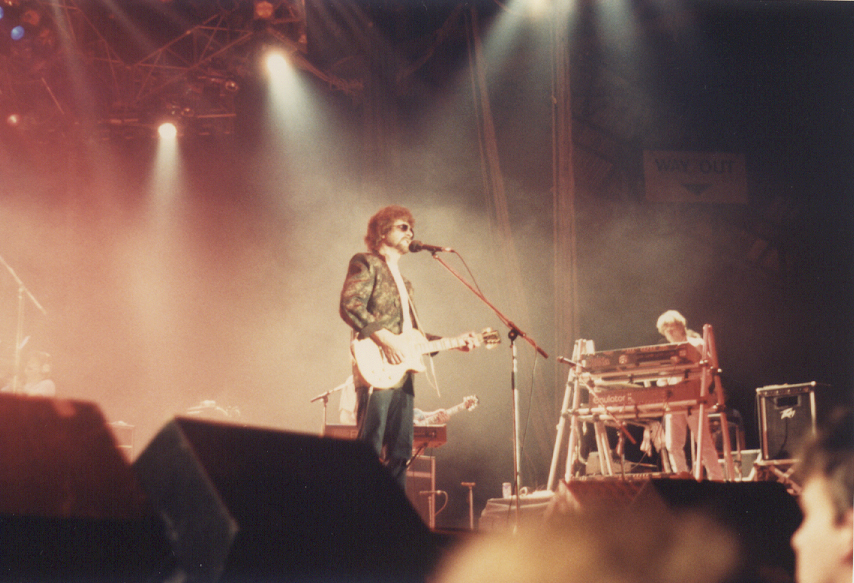
ELO performing in 1986. Frontman Jeff Lynne was one of prog-pop's "signature architects".

Progressive rock (also known as art rock) was ushered in the 1970s, directly following the combination of classical grandiosity and pop experimentalism from the 1960s. Although it reached widespread popularity, from 1975 onward, the genre declined in sales and was played with less frequency on FM radio. According to Breithaupt and Breithaupt, this created a vacuum for "a host of new, milder 'serious' bands, whose humor (Queen), pop smarts (Supertramp), and style (Roxy Music, mach two) would ensure their survival into the eighties. ... they met the melodic requirements of AM radio while still producing thoughtful, original work." Bands like Queen and Electric Light Orchestra (ELO) played a type of progressive pop that was grounded in prog-rock without compromising their chart success. Reed cited ELO's "Mr. Blue Sky" as the "definitive statement" by ELO's Jeff Lynne, who "infus[ed] the Beatles’ kaleidoscopic post-Peppers sing-alongs with symphonic grandeur." (Note: Writing in his 1997 book Rocking the Classics: English Progressive Rock and Counterculture, Edward Macan defined "British symphonic pop" as a splinter of the progressive rock genre that relied on straightforward songwriting, rich vocal arrangements and quasi-orchestral fullness, citing Supertramp, ELO, 10cc, the Alan Parsons Project, and Al Stewart as examples.)

Supertramp – "The Logical Song" (1979)
Supertramp's "The Logical Song" was one specific example of progressive pop named by Breithaupt and Breithaupt. (Note: Others were "Love Is the Drug" (Roxy Music, 1976), "Bohemian Rhapsody" (Queen, 1976), "Dream Weaver" (Gary Wright, 1976), "The Things We Do for Love" (10cc, 1976), "Year of the Cat" (Al Stewart, 1977), "Solsbury Hill" (Peter Gabriel, 1977), "I Wouldn't Want to Be Like You" (Alan Parsons Project, 1977), "Telephone Line" (Electric Light Orchestra, 1977), and "The Man with the Child in His Eyes" (Kate Bush, 1979).)

The Buggles' Geoff Downes, who considered his band to be a continuation of ELO and 10cc's progressive traditions, says: "Those early 10cc records such as [1973 debut] 10cc and Sheet Music were pretty out there, and Godley & Creme took that even further. Even ABBA had sections in their music that were quite intricate. We loved all that studio trickery and experimentation. Parallel to that were bands like Yes, who were experimenting in the studio in a more progressive rock format." Porcupine Tree founder Steven Wilson opined that there were "hugely ambitious" progressive pop records in the 1970s and 1980s that were "quite accessible on the surface, but if you [chose] to engage with them on a deeper level, you [could] find layers in the production, musicianship and some thoughtful lyrics."

=== 1980s–2010s ===
Prog-pop records sold poorly and appeared unfashionable following the emergence of new wave and punk rock. By the late 1970s, the era of record labels investing in their artists, giving them freedom to experiment and limited control over their content and marketing had ended. Corporate artists and repertoire staff began exerting an increasing amount of control over the creative process that had previously belonged to the artists. Some of the major progressive bands transitioned to a more commercial sound and deemphasized the evocation of art music. By the early 1980s, the prevailing view was that the prog-rock style had ceased to exist.

Some mainstream pop acts, such as Tears for Fears, continued the traditions of prog-pop. In 1985, Simon Reynolds noted that the new pop movement attempted to "bridge" the divide between "progressive" pop and its mass/chart counterpart, describing their general relationship as "one between boys and girls, middle-class and working-class." In 2008, The New York Times' John Wray observed a recent progressive pop trend that involved large bands or collectives "with a disdain for clearly defined hierarchies", noting examples such as Arcade Fire, Broken Social Scene, and Animal Collective.
