= Paul Hegarty (musician) =

Musician

Paul Hegarty (born 12 January 1967) is a professor of French and Francophone studies, an author, experimental musician, and lecturer in aesthetics. Hegarty teaches Philosophy and Visual Culture at University of Nottingham.

== Contributions ==
Hegarty is best known as the author of Noise/Music, a 2007 noise music history. But has also written books on the subjects of Sound Studies, Experimental Music, Aesthetics, History and Theory of Art, New Media and Technology, Political Theory and Philosophy, Popular Music, Electronic Music, 1960s art and French Theory, such as on Georges Bataille and Jean Baudrillard.

Hegarty is a co-series editor of the Ex:Centrics series with Bloomsbury Press.

== Music ==
He jointly runs the experimental record label dotdotdotmusic, and performs in the noise bands Safe and La Société des Amis du Crime.

== Publications ==
- Rumour and Radiation: Sound in Video Art 2015
- Noise Music 2007
- Beyond and Before 2011
- Jean Baudrillard (Live Theory) 2004
- Georges Bataille: Core Cultural Theorist 2000
