= Vernacular music =

Term used to describe ordinary, everyday music

Vernacular music is ordinary, everyday music such as popular and folk music. It is defined partly in terms of its accessibility, standing in contrast to art music. Typically, vernacular music, like a number of oral/aural art forms (dance, sport, handicrafts, and so forth), is taught via processes of demonstration, imitation, and critique. It often entails knowledge- and skills-transmission from an elder or more experienced practitioner to a learning or aspiring one.

Vernacular music may overlap with non-vernacular, particular in the context of musical commerce, and is often informed by the developments of non-vernacular traditions.

The sales of phonograph records played a dominant role in spreading a cultural taste for popular and vernacular music styles.

== See also ==
- Dance music
- Low culture
- Vernacular Music Center
