= Bill Martin (philosopher) =

American philosopher

Bill Martin (born 1956) is a retired professor of philosophy at DePaul University whose academic work concerns Badiou, Derrida, Sartre, Marxist theory, Aesthetics, and critiques of Richard Rorty. Martin has also written on progressive rock bands including Yes. He has been accused of stalking and sexual harassment by several students.

== Works ==
- "Avant Rock: Experimental Music from the Beatles to Björk"
- "Humanism and Its Aftermath: The Shared Fate of Deconstruction and Politics"
- "Marxism and the Call of the Future: Conversations on Ethics, History, and Politics" co-written with Bob Avakian.
- "Matrix and Line: Derrida and the Possibilities of Postmodern Social Theory"
- "Music of Yes: Structure and Vision in Progressive Rock"
- "Listening to the Future: The Time of Progressive Rock, 1968–1978"
- "Politics in the Impasse: Explorations in Postsecular Social Theory"
- "The radical project: Sartrean investigations"
- "Ethical Marxism: The Categorical Imperative of Liberation (Creative Marxism)"
- "Into the Wild: Badiou, actually-existing Maoism, and the “vital mix” of yesterday and tomorrow"

== See also ==
- American philosophy
- List of American philosophers
