= Sir Patrick Spens =

Traditional song

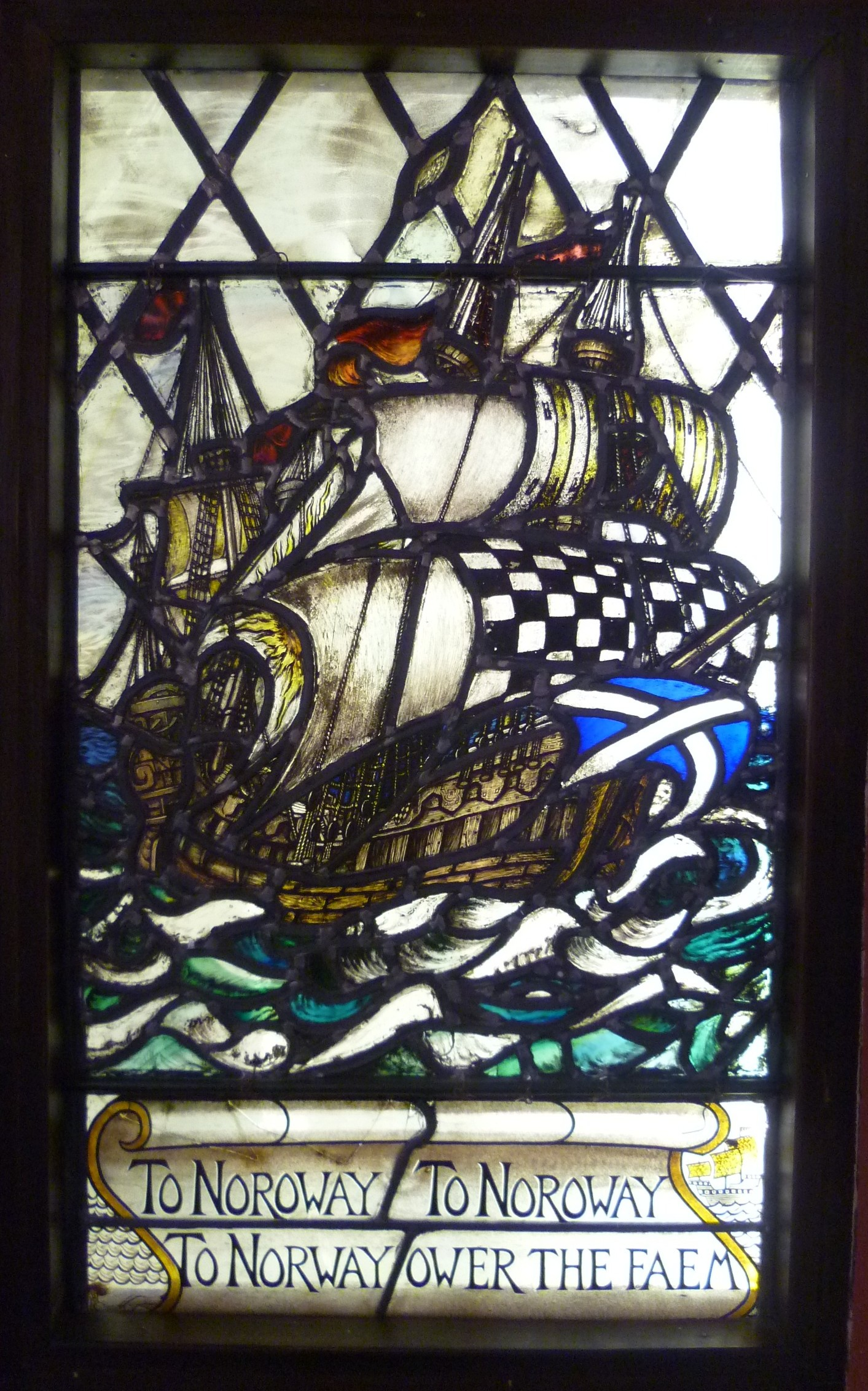
Stained-glass window by Charles Cameron Baillie, c.1930

"Sir Patrick Spens" is one of the most popular of the Child Ballads (No. 58) (Roud 41), and is of Scottish origin. It is a maritime ballad about a disaster at sea.

== Background ==
Sir Patrick Spens remains one of the most anthologized of British popular ballads, partly because it exemplifies the traditional ballad form. The strength of this ballad, its emotional force, lies in its unadorned narrative which progresses rapidly to a tragic end that has been foreshadowed almost from the beginning. It was first published in eleven stanzas in 1765 in Bishop Thomas Percy's Reliques of Ancient English Poetry, based on "two MS. copies transmitted from Scotland".

The protagonist is referred to as "young Patrick Spens" in some versions of the ballad.

== Plot ==
The story as told in the ballad has multiple versions, but they all follow the same basic plot. The King of Scotland has called for the greatest sailor in the land to command a ship for a royal errand. The name "Sir Patrick Spens" is mentioned by a courtier, and the king despatches a letter. Sir Patrick is dismayed at being commanded to put to sea in the dead of winter, clearly realising this voyage could well be his last.

Versions differ somewhat at this point. Some indicate that a storm sank the ship in the initial crossing, thus ending the ballad at this point, while many have Sir Patrick safely reaching Norway. In Norway tension arises between the Norwegian lords and the Scots, who are accused of being a financial burden on the king. Sir Patrick, taking offence, leaves the following day. Nearly all versions, whether they have the wreck on the outward voyage or the return, relate the bad omen of seeing "the new mune late yestreen, with the auld mune in her airms", and modern science agrees the tides would be at maximum force at that time. The winter storms have the best of the great sailor, sending him and the Scottish lords to the bottom of the sea.

== Version ==
Francis James Child collected some eighteen versions of Sir Patrick Spens. There is no one definitive version of more validity than any other, because the song continues in oral tradition and it may be interpreted in both the singing and the transcription. This is one version:

"Sir Patrick Spens"

1. The king sits in Dunfermline toune
drinking the blude reid wine,
"O whar can I get skeely skipper,
To sail this ship o' mine?"

2. Up and spak an eldern knicht,
Sat at the kings richt kne:
"Sir Patrick Spens is the best sailor
That sails upon the se."

3. The king has written a braid letter,
And signed it wi his hand,
And sent it to Sir Patrick Spens,
Was walking on the strand.

4. To Noroway! to Noroway!
to Noroway oer the faem!
The king's daughter to Noroway
'Tis thou maun bring her hame.

5. The first line that Sir Patrick red,
A loud lauch lauched he;
The next line that Sir Patrick red,
A teir blinded his ee.

6. "O wha is this has don this deid,
This ill deid don to me,
To send me out this time o' yeir,
To sail upon the se!

7. "Mak haste, mak haste, my mirry men,
Our guid ship sails the morne":
"O say na sae, my master deir,
I feir a deadlie storme.

8. "Yestreen I saw the new moone,
Wi the auld moone in her arme,
And I feir, I feir, my master deir,
That we will cum to harme."

9. O loth, o loth,
The Scots lords were
To weet their cork-heild schoone;
Bot lang owre a' the play wer playd,
Thair hats they swam aboone.

10. O lang, lang may the ladies sit,
Wi' their fans into their hand
Or ere they see Sir Patrick Spens
Come sailing to the strand.

11. O lang, lang may the ladies stand,
Wi thair gold kems in their hair,
Waiting for thair ain deir lords,
For they'll se thame na mair.

12. Haf owre, haf owre to Aberdour,
Tis fiftie fathom deip,
And thair lies guid Sir Patrick Spens,
The Scots lords at his feit.

== Analysis ==
The story itself is simple and yet universal in its theme: the courageous knight dutifully obeys the command of his king despite the knowledge that he will almost certainly be going to his death. In the two-stanza exchange between Spens and the old sailor, Mark Strand and Eavan Boland have noted "the immediacy, music, and fatalism of the ballad..." (Note: Strand, Mark; Boland, Eavan (2000). The Making of a Poem: A Norton Anthology of Poetic Forms. New York: W. W. Norton. p. 75. ISBN 9780393049169. apud Hurley & O'Neill 2012, p. 191.)

William Bowman Piper identifies a pattern of contrasts between authority, represented by the anonymous king, and nobility, as displayed by Patrick Spens. The references to the women awaiting the arrival of their men describe an experience common to any dangerous enterprise in peacetime or in war, and as old as the Bible.

== Historicity ==
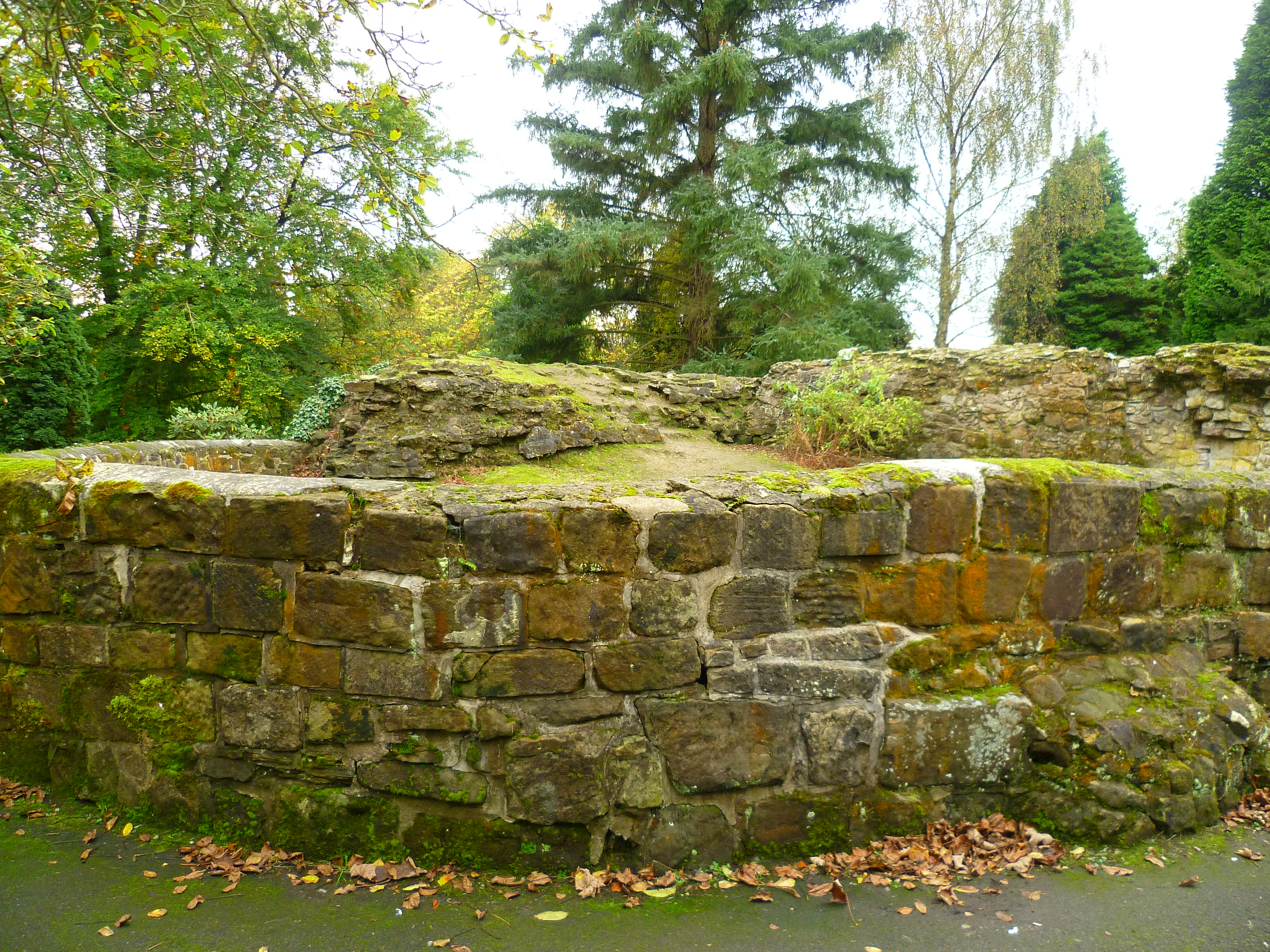
Ruins of Malcolm's Tower, Dunfermline

William H. Matchett considers the ballad probably to be fiction.

The events of the ballad are similar to, and may chronicle, an actual event:

- In 1290, the Scottish heir to the throne, the seven-year-old Margaret, Maid of Norway, was being conveyed across the North Sea to Scotland when she took sick and died. Her mother, Margaret was married to Eric II of Norway in the summer of 1281. She was conducted to the wedding in Bergen by a number of knights and nobles, who were drowned on the return voyage.
- The name "Patrick Spens" has no historical record, and, like many of the heroes of such ballads, is probably an invention, although some historians believe that he was actually Sir Patrick Vans of Barnbarroch. Vans was the original ambassador sent to negotiate the marriage between James VI and Anne of Denmark, and accompanied James VI when he set out during tempestuous weather in October 1589 to bring home his bride, who had been driven back to the coast of Norway by storms. It was Thomas Finlayson Henderson’s theory that the ballad was most likely based on this voyage.

The opening lines refer to a king who is located in Dunfermline where historically there was a royal residence, Dunfermline Palace. The mention of the place further connects it with the Patrick Vans hypothesis cited above, as James VI resided in the palace during the plague in Edinburgh in 1585, and subsequently gave it as a present to his bride Anne of Denmark.

Earl's Knowle on Papa Stronsay is traditionally held to be the final resting place of Sir Patrick Spens. The history relating to the burial of Sir Patrick Spens on Earl’s Knowle on Papa Stronsay is related by William Edmonstoune Aytoun (b. Edinburgh 21 June 1813, d. 4 August 1865), Sheriff and Lord Admiral of Orkney and Shetland. It was after his retirement from this position that he edited a collection of Scottish poetry in which the first poem is Sir Patrick Spens. In his foreword to the poem Aytoun, he writes:

“It is true that the name of Sir Patrick Spens is not mentioned in history; but I am able to state that tradition has preserved it. In the little island of Papa Stronsay, one of the Orcadian group, lying over against Norway, there is a large grave or tumulus, which has been known to the inhabitants, from time immemorial, as ‘The grave of Sir Patrick Spens’. The Scottish ballads were not early current in Orkney, a Scandinavian country; so it is very unlikely that the poem could have originated the name. The people know nothing beyond the traditional appellation of the spot, and they have no legend to tell. Spens is a Scottish, not a Scandinavian name. Is it, then, a forced conjecture, that the shipwreck took place off the iron bound coast of the northern islands, which did not then belong to the Crown of Scotland? ‘Half ower to Aberdour’ signifies nothing more than that the vessel went down half-way between Norway and the port of embarkation.”

== Influence ==
- The ballad fragment Hardyknute (1719), attributed to Elizabeth Halket, Lady Wardlaw, appears to draw phrases from a version of Sir Patrick Spens.
- Walter Scott published a version in his 1802 anthology Minstrelsy of the Scottish Border.
- Samuel Taylor Coleridge opens "Dejection: An Ode" quoting the old sailor's apprehension of the weather having seen "... the new Moon, With the old Moon in her arms".
- In The Old Seaport David Macbeth Moir cites Spens as an heroic seaman, mirrored in the men of Culross.
- In the 1903 Edinburgh: Picturesque Notes, Robert Louis Stevenson quotes the verse "O lang, lang may the ladies sit, Wi' their fans into their hand..." comparing them to the sailors' wives of Leith and the fisherwomen of Cockenzie "...crowding to the tail of the harbor with a shawl about their ears..." looking for the return of the boats.
- Robert Lucas Pearsall: "Sir Patrick Spens", a 10-part vocal arrangement for double choir.
- Herbert Howells: "Sir Patrick Spens", Op. 23 (1917)
- Louis MacNeice’s poem ‘’The North Sea’’ (1948) recounts a voyage to Norway and includes many references to Sir Patrick Spens.
- In Euphoria by author Lily King the lead characters Nell and Bankston, fictionalized versions of Margaret Mead and Gregory Bateson recite part of the poem, alternating the opening lines, during a tense night encamped with a primitive tribe in New Guinea.

== Recordings ==
Artists who have recorded musical versions of the ballad include:

- Buffy Sainte Marie on her album Little wheel spin and spin, released in 1966
- Peter Bellamy on his 1982 album "The Maritime England Suite"
- Ewan MacColl on several occasions
- Fairport Convention on their 1970 album Full House, and with Sandy Denny in the reissue of Liege & Lief
- Nic Jones on his 1970 album, Ballads and Songs
- Jackie Leven on his 1997 album Fairytales For Hard Men
- Martin Carthy on his 1998 album Signs of Life
- John Roberts on his 2003 album Sea Fever, as well as a song derived from another Child Ballad, The Sweet Trinity
- June Tabor in her 2003 album An Echo of Hooves
- Jim Malcolm Live at Glenfarg 2004, Home 2002
- James Yorkston on his 2005 mini-album Hoopoe
- Robin Williamson on his 2006 album The Iron Stone
- Kris Drever on his 2006 mini-album Black Water, titled "Patrick Spence"
- Martin Simpson on his 2009 album True Stories
- Anaïs Mitchell and Jefferson Hamer on the album Child Ballads
- John Langstaff on his 1964 album Nottamun Town
- Being a well-documented song publicised by Mudcat, and Mainly Norfolk, the song was recorded by Jon Boden and Oli Steadman for inclusion in their respective lists of daily folk songs "A Folk Song a Day" and "365 Days Of Folk".
- West of Eden as a 2026 single

== See also ==
- List of the Child Ballads
