= Just Like the River and Other Songs for Guitar =

Just Like The River And Other Songs For Guitar

Studio album by Robin Williamson
- Released: December 2008
- Recorded: 2008
- Genre: Folk
- Length: 48:22
- Label: Quadrant Records
- Producer: Robin Williamson/J.Ramon Jove

Robin Williamson chronology
The Iron Stone (2006)	Just Like The River And Other Songs For Guitar (2008)

Just Like The River And Other Songs For Guitar is a folk album released in 2008 by Robin Williamson. The song "Through The Horned Clouds" is originally from the 1972 album Myrrh, "The Man In The Van" is from the 1978 album American Stonehenge and "Wild Horses" is from The Rolling Stones' 1971 album Sticky Fingers.

== Track listing ==
All songs written by Robin Williamson, except "When First To This Country" (Traditional), "Wild Horses" (Jagger/Richards) and "Absolutely Sweet Marie" (Bob Dylan).

1. Take A Heed Of Me Sometime
2. Through The Horned Clouds
3. Wild Horses
4. When First To This Country
5. Jordan Is A Hard Road
6. The Man In The Van
7. Matt Groves And Lady Barnard
8. Down In Cupid's Garden
9. Absolutely Sweet Marie
10. Just Like The River
11. The Silence Between The Words
12. Song For Bina
