= American Stonehenge =

American Stonehenge may refer to:

== Places ==
- America's Stonehenge, an archaeological site in Salem, New Hampshire
- Amazon Stonehenge, an archaeological site in northern Brazil
- Tiwanaku, a Pre-Columbian archaeological site in western Bolivia
- Georgia Guidestones, a contemporary megalith in Elbert County, Georgia

== Other ==
- American Stonehenge (album), by Robin Williamson and his Merry Band
