= Legacy of the Scottish Harpers =

Studio album by Robin Williamson
- Released: 1986
- Recorded: 1984–1986
- Genre: Folk
- Length: 37:11
- Label: Flying Fish
- Producer: Robin Williamson

Robin Williamson chronology
Music for the Mabinogi (1983)	Legacy of the Scottish Harpers (1986)	Legacy of the Scottish Harpers Volume Two (1986)

Professional ratings
Review scores
Source	Rating
Allmusic	link

Legacy of the Scottish Harpers is a folk album released in 1986 by Robin Williamson.

Williamson had taken an interest in placing the harp in his music ever since Sylvia Woods played it in Williamson's album Journey's Edge. On this album, Williamson has complete focus on utilizing the harp for his somber Celtic and folk tracks.

== Track listing ==
All pieces traditionally arranged by Robin Williamson.

1. Scottish Cap/Scotland
2. Floweres of the Forest Cromlets Lilt/ Chevy Chase
3. Weel Hoddleed Lucky/The Lochaben Harper
4. Gilderoy/Cow the Gowans
5. MacGregor's Lamentation/MacGregor's Search
6. Kilt Thy Coat Maggie/Three Sheepskins
7. Lord Dundee's Lamentation/ The Brae's O' Killiekrankie
8. I'll Mak Ye Fain to Follow Me/Shame Fa' the Gear and the blathrie O't Donald Couper
9. Lady Cassilis' Lilt/The Auld Jew/The Broom O'Cowdenknoes
10. MacDonald of the Isles' Salutation
11. Rushes/Birk and Green Hollin
12. Soor Plooms
13. Jockey Drucken Babble/Sae Mirrie As We Hae Been/Jockey Went To The Wood
14. Omnia Vincent Amor/The Banks Of Helicon/Deil Tak The Wars
