= Songs of Love and Parting =

Studio album by Robin Williamson
- Released: 1981
- Recorded: February – March 1981
- Genre: Folk
- Length: 39:42
- Label: Claddagh
- Producer: Robin Williamson

Robin Williamson chronology
A Glint at the Kindling (1979)	Songs of Love and Parting (1981)	Music for the Mabinogi (1983)

Professional ratings
Review scores
Source	Rating
AllMusic	link

Songs of Love and Parting is a folk album released in 1981 by Robin Williamson.

This album was the first since Myrrh to not include his Merry Band. One track, "For Mr. Thomas", is a tribute to the Welsh poet Dylan Thomas, and would later be covered by Van Morrison.

The 2005 CD re-release by Gott Discs includes five bonus poetry tracks: "Selected Writings". The "Selected Writings" are poems and songs by Williamson released on cassette, but were only ever available in concert.

== Track listing ==
1. "Verses in Stewart Street"
2. "For Mr Thomas"
3. "Fare Thee Well Sweet Mally"
4. "Return No More"
5. "Tarry Wool"
6. "For Three of Us"
7. "Sigil"
8. "Flower of the Briar"
9. "The Forming of Blodeuwedd"
10. "Gwydion's Dream"
11. "Verses at Balwearie Tower"
12. "A Night at Ardpatrick"
13. "The Parting Glass"

== Personnel ==
- Robin Williamson – Vocal, harp, guitar, shawm, whistle, accordion, harmonium, bagpipes, percussion, cittern, glass harp
- Carol Shive – Violin
- David Campbell – Viola
- Jesse Elrich – Cello
- Mike Garson – Harpsichord
- Bernie Kirsh – Hunting horn
- Judy Gameral – Hammered dulcimer
