= Songs for Children of All Ages =

Songs For Children of All Ages

Studio album by Robin Williamson
- Released: 1987
- Genre: Folk
- Length: 34:15
- Label: Flying Fish
- Producer: Robin Williamson

Robin Williamson chronology
Winter's Turning (1986)	Songs For Children of All Ages (1987)	Ten of Songs (1988)

Professional ratings
Review scores
Source	Rating
Allmusic	4.5/5 stars

Songs For Children of All Ages is a folk album released in 1987 by Robin Williamson. The album was released in 1987 on the Flying Fish label and on Cladagh Records. It was re-issued with Winter's Turning in 1999 on Pig's Whisker Music.

== Track listing ==
All songs are Traditional, except "Witches Hat" and "The Water Song" (Williamson), both of which are originally from The Incredible String Band 1968 album The Hangman's Beautiful Daughter.

1. Witches Hat
2. The Herring Song
3. Three Men Went-A-Hunting
4. Fool's Song
5. Horse's Dance
6. Brian O'Linn
7. Butter
8. The Water Song
9. The Raggle Taggle Gipsies
10. Froggy Would A-Wooing Go
11. Liberty/Old Dan Tucker
12. Ivy, Sing Ivy
13. The Back of Burnie's Hill/ Over the Hill's and Far Away
14. The Gartan Lullaby
