= Joemy Wilson =

American musician

Joemy Wilson is a hammered dulcimer player from New Haven, Connecticut. Her first instruments were the piano and violin. She also took voice lessons in high school. She started playing Appalachian dulcimer while attending Barnard College, and started playing hammered dulcimer in 1979.

Wilson has made several recordings on the Dargason label, and is particularly noted for her recordings of the compositions of Irish harper Turlough O'Carolan. She has collaborated with several artists, including Miamon Miller, Valarie King, Scott Fraser, Anisa Angarola, and Sylvia Woods.

== Early life ==
Joemy graduated Barnard College.

== Discography ==
- Carolan's Cup: Music of Turlough O'Carolan Volume I (1984)
- Gifts: Traditional Christmas Carols (1985)
- Carolan's Cottage: Music of Turlough O'Carolan Volume II (1986)
- Gifts II: Traditional Christmas Carols (1987)
- Beatles on Hammered Dulcimer (1989)
- Celtic Dreams: Music of Turlough O'Carolan Volume III (1989)
- Gifts III: Christmas Music From Around The World (1990)
- Dulcimer Lullabies (1991)
- Celtic Treasures: Music of Ireland Volume IV (1994)
