= Winter's Turning =

Studio album by Robin Williamson
- Released: 1986
- Genre: Folk
- Length: 36:01
- Label: Flying Fish
- Producer: Robin Williamson

Robin Williamson chronology
| Legacy of the Scottish Harpers Volume Two (1986) | Winter's Turning (1986) | Songs For Children of All Ages (1987) |

Professional ratings
Review scores
| Source | Rating |
|---|---|
| Allmusic | 3/5 stars |

Winter's Turning is a folk album released in 1986 by Robin Williamson. The album was recorded in Los Angeles.

The album dwelled into the winter holidays and British Isle lore. Williamson does this through instrumental folk and folk ballads. Williamson utilizes the acoustic instruments, including mandolin, hammered dulcimer, and guitar, to the fullest. There is an equal balance of the instrumentals along with vocal performances.

== Track listing ==
1. Drive The Cold Winter Away/Cold and Raw
2. Avant De S'En Aller
3. Past Time with Good Company/Somerset Wassail
4. Greensleeves Morris/Green Groweth the Holly/Eagle's Whistle
5. Past 1 O'clock/Great Tom's Cast
6. Sheep Under The Snow/Welsh Morris
7. Praetorius' Courante/Drive The Cold Winter Away
8. Blow Blow Thou Winter Wynd/Vivaldi's Winter Largo/Trip to the Boar/Manage The Miser
9. Carolan's Quarrel With The Landlady/Christmas Eve
10. Hunting the Wren
11. Corelli's Sonato/36 Allegro/Scottish Country Dance
12. Polka du Tapis
