= A Glint at the Kindling =

Studio album by Robin Williamson and his Merry Band
- Released: 1979
- Recorded: January – February 1979
- Genre: Folk
- Length: 42:39
- Label: Criminal
- Producer: Robin Williamson

Robin Williamson and his Merry Band chronology
American Stonehenge (1978)	A Glint at the Kindling (1979)	Songs of Love and Parting (1981)

Professional ratings
Review scores
Source	Rating
Allmusic	3/5 stars

A Glint at the Kindling is a folk album released in 1979 by Robin Williamson and his Merry Band.

This album would be the last collaboration between Robin Williamson and his Merry Band. Largely biographical, the album's concept is based on Williamson's own poem entitled Five Denials On Merlin's Grave which in turn was inspired by five broad stages of ancient British history. Many of the tracks, including "Me and the Mad Girl" and "Lough Foyle", are still performed by Williamson today.

The 2005 CD re-release by Gott Discs includes 5 bonus poetry tracks: "Five Bardic Mysteries". These were originally released in 1985 on cassette and it showcases Williamson's skill as a storyteller.

== Track listing ==
1. "The Road The Gypsies Go" (Robin Williamson) –
2. "Me and the Mad Girl" (Williamson) –
3. "Lough Foyle" (Williamson) –
4. "The Woodcutter's Song" (Williamson) –
5. "By Weary Well" (Chris Caswell, Williamson) –
6. "Boyhood of Henry Morgan/ The Pooka" (Chris Caswell, McMillan, Williamson, Sylvia Woods) –
7. "Five Denials of Merlin's Grave" (Caswell, McMillan, Williamson, Woods) –
8. "The Poacher's Song" (Williamson) –

== Personnel ==
- Robin Williamson – vocals, 6 and 12 string guitars, mandolin, percussion, harp, mandocello, jaw harp, bombard, mouth organ.
- Sylvia Woods – harmonium, harp, harpsichord
- Jerry McMillan – fiddle, viola
- Chris Caswell – bagpipes, flute, percussion, trombone, accordion, concertina, harp, recorder, spoons, mouth organ
- John Gilson – drums
- Michael Bach – bass guitar
