= Music for the Mabinogi =

Soundtrack album by Robin Williamson
- Released: 1983
- Genre: Folk
- Length: 35:52
- Label: Flying Fish
- Producer: Robin Williamson

Robin Williamson chronology
Songs of Love and Parting (1981)	Music for the Mabinogi (1983)	Legacy of the Scottish Harpers (1986)

Professional ratings
Review scores
Source	Rating
Allmusic	3/5 stars

Music for the Mabinogi is a folk soundtrack album released in 1983 by Robin Williamson. The soundtrack was created for a 1983 bi-lingual theatrical production of the Mabinogion which, during live performance runs in both Caernafon Castle and Cardiff Castle, was filmed and subsequently broadcast on the Welsh language television channel S4C and on Channel 4. The play was produced by the Cardiff based Moving Being theatre company.

== Track listing ==
1. "Arianrhod"
2. "Birds of Rhiannon"
3. "Bran's Head"
4. "Branswen in Ireland"
5. "Death of Gronw"
6. "Enchantments of Llwyd"
7. "Fine Leather From Seaweed"
8. "Gallows For a Mouse"
9. "Gwydion's Song to Lleu"
10. "Manawydan in London"
11. "Naming Pryderi"
12. "Parting Words"
13. "Pwyil"
14. "Pyderi's Song"
15. "Revenges of Math"
16. "Three Nursemaids"
17. "Unlikely Virgin"
18. "When Two Hearts Are True"
19. "Rhiannon"
20. "Badger in the Bag"
21. "Matholwch's Ships"
22. "Cradlesong"
