= The Iron Stone =

Studio album by Robin Williamson
- Released: October 2006
- Recorded: September 2005
- Genre: Folk jazz • folk • jazz
- Length: 64:19
- Label: ECM
- Producer: Steve Lake

Robin Williamson chronology
Four Gruagach Tales (2006)	The Iron Stone (2006)	Just Like The River And Other Songs For Guitar (2008)

Professional ratings
Review scores
Source	Rating
Allmusic	link

The Iron Stone is an album released in 2006 by Robin Williamson. It is the third in a trio of Robin Williamson albums on ECM Records. "The Yellow Snake" and "The Iron Stone" are originally from the album Wee Tam and the Big Huge by The Incredible String Band, and "Verses At Ellesmere" and "Political lies" are from Ten of Songs.

== Reception ==
The Iron Stone received critical acclaim for its lyrical ambition and sonic experimentation. Writing for All About Jazz, Nenad Georgievski described the album as “a celebration of language and poetry mixed with music,” highlighting Williamson’s ability to merge traditional verse with contemporary improvisation. He noted that the album presents “a moody collage demonstrative of his great musical spectrum,” blending folk, jazz, and spoken word into a deeply introspective and unconventional listening experience.

== Track listing ==
1. "The Climber" (Maneri, Möller, Phillips, Williamson)
2. "Sir Patrick Spens" (Traditional)
3. "Wyatt's Song of Reproach" (Williamson, Wyatt)
4. "There Is a Music" (Maneri, Phillips, Williamson)
5. "Even Such Is Time" (Morison, Raleigh)
6. "The Iron Stone" (Williamson)
7. "The Badger" (Clare, Maneri, Möller, Phillips, Williamson)
8. "Political Lies" (Williamson)
9. "The Yellow Snake" (Williamson)
10. "Loftus Jones" (Maneri, Turlough O'Carolan, Phillips, Williamson)
11. "Bacchus" (Emerson, Maneri, Möller, Phillips, Williamson)
12. "The Praises of the Mountain Hare" (Maneri, Möller, Phillips, Williamson)
13. "To God in God's Absence" (Williamson)
14. "Verses at Ellesmere" (Williamson)
15. "Henceforth" (Maneri, Phillips, Williamson)

== Personnel ==
- Robin Williamson – Vocals, Celtic Harp, Chinese Flute, Mohan Veena
- Barre Phillips – Double Bass
- Ale Möller – Flute, Trumpet, Accordion, Shawm, Mandola, Jaw Harp
- Mat Maneri – Fiddle, Viola
