= Old Blind Dogs =

Musical group

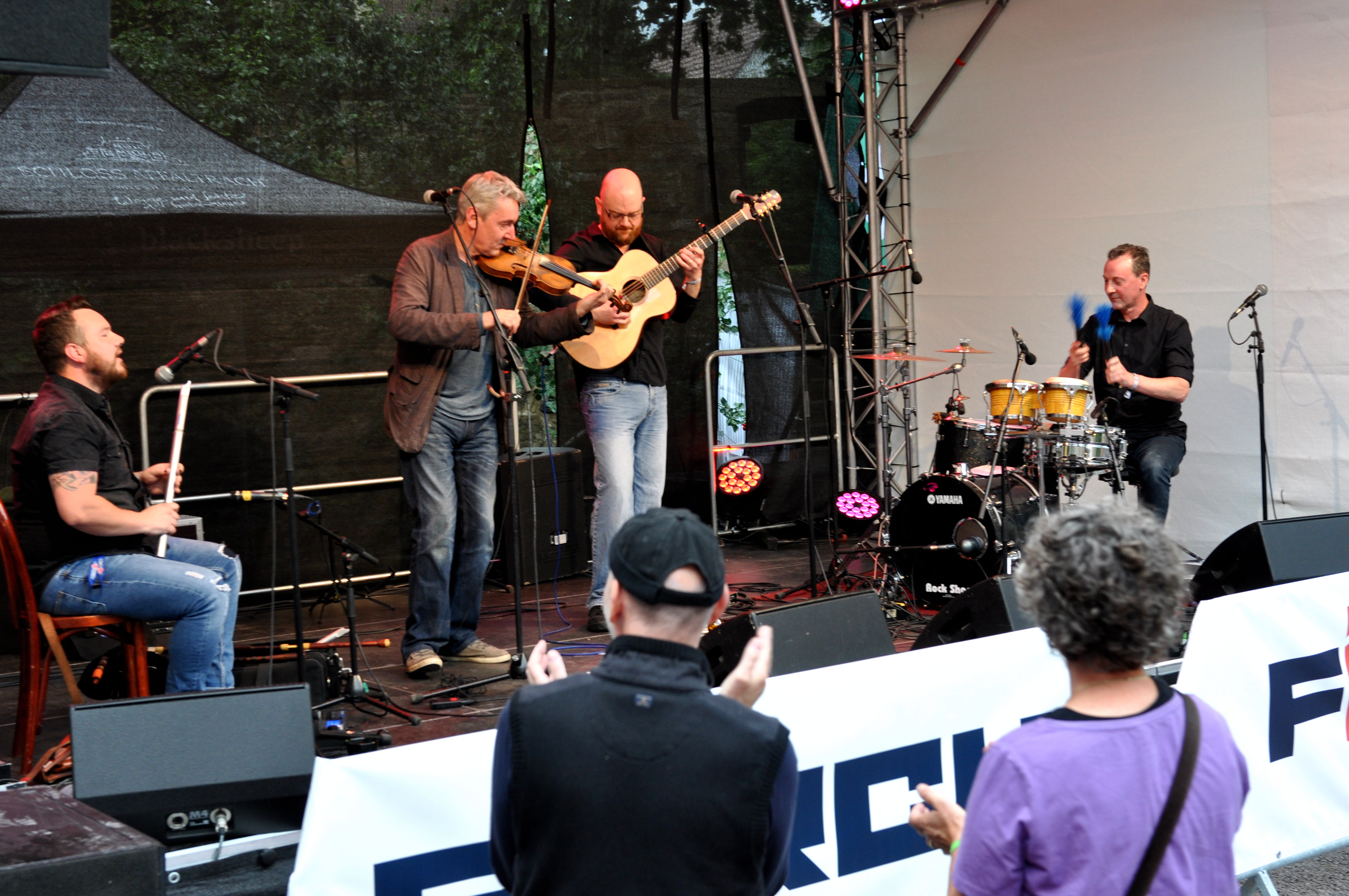
- Old Blind Dogs at the 2016 blacksheep festival in Germany

Background information
- Origin: Aberdeen, Scotland
- Genres: Scottish folk, Celtic
- Years active: 1990–present
- Labels: Green Linnet
- Members: Jonny Hardie; Aaron Jones; Donald Hay
- Website: oldblinddogs.co.uk

Old Blind Dogs is a Scottish musical group which plays traditional Scottish folk music and Celtic music, with influences from rock, reggae, jazz, blues, and Middle Eastern music rhythms.

== Background ==
The three founding members of the band (Ian F. Benzie, Buzzby McMillan and Jonny Hardie) first met during a so-called "buskers' holiday" in the Scottish Highlands in 1990, and after playing together for the summer decided to call themselves "Old Blind Dogs". Dave Francis and Carmen Higgins joined the band soon afterwards, but left in 1992 before the recording of the first album, New Tricks. Since that time, the line-up of the band has changed frequently, with only Jonny Hardie remaining from the original group.

The Old Blind Dogs were named "Folk Band of the Year" at the Scots Trad Music Awards. Also in 2004, Jim Malcolm was named Songwriter of the Year. In 2001, the UK's Association of Independent Music selected their album Fit? as a finalist for the Celtic Album of the Year award.

The band have toured extensively, performing in Britain, the US, Denmark, Germany, Poland, Spain, Italy, and Russia.

== Discography ==
- New Tricks (1992)
- Close to the Bone (1993)
- Tall Tails (1994)
- Legacy (1995)
- Five (1997)
- Live (1999)
- The World's Room (1999)
- Fit? (2001)
- The Gab o' Mey (2003)
- Play Live (2004)
- Four on the Floor (2007)
- Wherever Yet May Be (2010)
- Room with a View (2017)
- Knucklehead Circus (2021)

== Band members ==
1990–92

- Ian F. Benzie (guitar, vocals)
- Jonny Hardie (fiddle, mandolin, guitar, backing vocals)
- Buzzby McMillan (cittern, bass)
- Carmen Higgins (fiddle)
- Dave Francis (percussion)
- Davy Cattanach (percussion) joined 1991

1992–96

- Ian F. Benzie
- Jonny Hardie
- Buzzby McMillan
- Davy Cattanach

1996–97

- Ian F. Benzie
- Jonny Hardie
- Buzzby McMillan
- Fraser Fifield (small pipes, saxophone)
- Davy Cattanach

1997–99

- Ian F. Benzie
- Fraser Fifield
- Graham Youngson (percussion)
- Jonny Hardie
- Buzzby McMillan

1999–2003

- Jim Malcolm (guitar, harmonica, lead vocals)
- Jonny Hardie (fiddle, guitar, backing vocals)
- Buzzby McMillan
- Rory Campbell (whistle, border pipes, guitar, harmonica, backing vocals)
- Paul Jennings (percussion) left 2002

2003–2006

- Jim Malcolm
- Jonny Hardie
- Rory Campbell
- Fraser Stone (drums, percussion)
- Aaron Jones (bouzouki, bass, backing vocals)

2007–2008

- Jonny Hardie (fiddle, guitar, vocals)
- Rory Campbell (border pipes, whistles, vocals)
- Fraser Stone (percussion)
- Aaron Jones (bouzouki, guitar, vocals)

2008–2016

- Jonny Hardie (fiddle, guitar, vocals)
- Ali Hutton (border pipes, whistles)
- Fraser Stone (percussion)
- Aaron Jones (bouzouki, guitar, vocals)

2016–2021

- Jonny Hardie (fiddle, guitar, vocals)
- Ali Hutton (Great Highland bagpipe, border pipes, whistles)
- Donald Hay (percussion)
- Aaron Jones (bouzouki, guitar, vocals)

2021-

- Jonny Hardie (fiddle, guitar, vocals)
- Mike Katz (UK/Europe: pipes, whistles)
- Elias Alexander (USA: pipes, whistles)
- Donald Hay (percussion)
- Aaron Jones (bouzouki, guitar, vocals)

In the following table, please note that although "Live" was released in 1999, the performers are those from the 1992–1996 line-up (Benzie, Hardie, McMillan, and Cattenach) and not those from "The World's Room" (a studio release from the same year).

Old Blind Dogs member timeline, 1990 – present
Name	1990s										2000s										2010s						
Name	0	1	2	3	4	5	6	7	8	9	0	1	2	3	4	5	6	7	8	9	0	16	17	18	19	20	21
Releases			New Tricks	Close to the Bone	Tall Tails	Legacy		Five		Live, The World's Room		Fit?		The Gab o Mey	Play Live			Four on the Floor			Wherever Yet May Be		Room With a View				Knucklehead Circus
Ian F. Benzie	guitar, vocals																										
Jonny Hardie	fiddle, mandolin, guitar, backing vocals									fiddle, guitar, backing vocals								fiddle, guitar, vocals									
Buzzby McMillan	cittern, bass																										
Carmen Higgins	fiddle																										
Dave Francis	percussion																										
Davy Cattanach		percussion																									
Fraser Fifield							small pipes, saxophone																				
Graham Youngson								percussion																			
Jim Malcolm										guitar, harmonica, lead vocals																	
Rory Campbell										border pipes, whistles, vocals																	
Paul Jennings										percussion																	
Fraser Stone														drums, percussion				percussion									
Aaron Jones															bouzouki, bass, backing vocals			bouzouki, guitar, vocals									
Ali Hutton																			border pipes, whistles			Great Highland bagpipes, border pipes, whistles					
Donald Hay																						percussion					
Mike Katz																											UK/Europe: pipes, whistles
Elias Alexander																											USA: pipes, whistles
