= American Stonehenge (album) =

Studio album by Robin Williamson and his Merry Band
- Released: 1978
- Recorded: December 1977
- Producer: Robin Williamson

Robin Williamson and his Merry Band chronology
Journey's Edge (1977)	American Stonehenge (1978)	A Glint at the Kindling (1979)

Professional ratings
Review scores
Source	Rating
Allmusic	4/5 stars

American Stonehenge is a folk album released in 1978 by Robin Williamson and his Merry Band. This album was produced by Robin Williamson and engineered by Dirk Dalton at Dirk Dalton Recording, Santa Monica, California, in December 1977.

The 2006 CD re-release by Gott Discs includes as a bonus the poetry piece "Song of Mabon" from a 1982 Poetry London magazine cover flexidisk.

== Track listing ==
All songs were written by Robin Williamson except "Zoo Blues" by Robin Williamson / Sylvia Woods / Christopher Caswell / Jerry McMillan.

1. "Port London Early"
2. "Pacheco"
3. "Keepsake"
4. "Zoo Blues"
5. "These Islands Green"
6. "The Man In The Van"
7. "Sands And The Glass"
8. "Her Scattered Gold"
9. "When Evening Shadows Fall"
10. "Rab's Last Woolen Testament"

== Personnel ==
- Robin Williamson - vocal, guitar, percussion, alto flute, hunting horn, swanee whistle, Jew's harp, mandolin, mandocello, Glenlivet bottle
- Sylvia Woods - Celtic harp, glockenspiel, harpsichord, kazoo, vocal
- Chris Caswell - flute, metal-strung harp, accordion, jug cheeks, animal noises, whistle, bagpipes, bodhran, vocal
- Jerry McMillan - violin, piano, viola, animal noises, vocal

with

- Pete Grant - six-string and ten-string dobro
- Dirk Dalton - bass guitar
- Stu Brotman - bowed bass
- Louis Killen - concertina
