= Ten of Songs =

Studio album by Robin Williamson
- Released: 1988
- Genre: Folk
- Length: 42:11
- Label: Plant Life
- Producer: Robin Williamson

Robin Williamson chronology
Songs For Children of All Ages (1987)	Ten of Songs (1988)	Music for the Newly Born (1990)

Ten of Songs is an album by the folk musician Robin Williamson, released in 1988.

== Critical reception ==
Professional ratings
Review scores
Source	Rating
AllMusic	3/5 stars
The Encyclopedia of Popular Music	3/5 stars
MusicHound Folk: The Essential Album Guide	0/5 stars

An AllMusic review claimed: "Ten of Songs is a delightful introduction into the storytelling side of Robin Williamson. These ten original pieces may not all be stories, per se, but Williamson's approach to each casually ebbs and flows between speaking and singing. His delivery evokes the Celtic heritage of sung ballads and story songs-traditions that have fascinated Williamson since his earlier days in the Incredible String Band. An electric guitarist, bassist, and drummer join Williamson on such riveting tracks as 'Skull and Nettlework'. Elsewhere, though, Williamson plays his usual array of acoustic instruments, including harp, guitar, cittern, and whistle. Listeners fond of Williamson's musical storytelling should also investigate his double-disc Gems of Celtic Story set".

Renaldo Migaldi, in the Chicago Reader, called the album "perhaps the most convincing example I’ve heard of bringing traditional Celtic music into today’s world without trashing its roots or turning it into some kind of bastardized rock and roll thing."

== Track listing ==
All songs written by Robin Williamson.

1. Ancient Song
2. Lammas
3. Political Lies
4. Scotland Yet
5. Skull and Nettlework
6. The Barley
7. Here to Burn
8. Verses at Ellesmere
9. Innocent Love
10. Verses at Powis
