= Sylvia Woods (harpist) =

American harpist and composer

Sylvia Woods (born 1951 in Tennessee) is an American harpist and composer, and is perhaps best known for her role in the worldwide renaissance of the Celtic harp, or cláirseach. Woods began selling and writing music for Celtic harps in the 1970s, when the instrument was not widely known in the United States, contributing to a groundswell of interest in the Celtic harp and music. Woods was named one of the “most influential harp forces of the twentieth century” by HarpColumn magazine.

== Biography ==
A lifelong musician, Woods began playing pedal (concert) harp in college after walking into the harp room at the University of Redlands in Southern California and asking for lessons. She continued to study pedal harp after receiving her bachelor's degree, but upon discovering and purchasing a Celtic harp, she dedicated her life to making Celtic harp music available to the public. Subsequent travels around the world as a soloist and ensemble performer cemented Woods’ reputation as a formidable talent in the folk harp milieu.

Woods won the prestigious All-Ireland Harp Championship in Buncrana, County Donegal in 1980, only the second American ever to have done so. She was invited back to Buncrana the following two summers to teach a harp course for local children, borrowing harps from all over Ireland so the children would learn to play the instrument, which is the symbol of their country.

Woods toured with Robin Williamson and His Merry Band in the 1970s and was featured on the group's three albums. Celtic harps were not readily available at the time, so Woods was often approached after concerts by people who were intrigued by her instrument, which she had purchased in Ireland. In response to their multiple requests, Woods began selling harps and developed collaborative relationships with several instrument makers in California, encouraging them to build harps and providing feedback on technical issues and user-friendly features.

Woods’ relationship with harp makers, along with her work in bringing folk harp to a wider audience, led to her leadership role in the early days of the International Society of Folk Harpers and Craftsmen as the group’s first President.

Noting a lack of repertoire and resources for the folk harp, Woods began writing and arranging music specifically for folk (or lever) harp in 1978. Woods’ first book, "Teach Yourself to Play the Folk Harp", is perhaps the best-known tutor for the lever harp and has been an introduction to harp playing for thousands of musicians. She has since published more than 80 books and sheet music arrangements for the Celtic harp, encompassing a wide variety of musical styles from folk to classical to pop.

Woods’ initial foray into harp sales grew into a large mail-order catalog offering products and resources for harpists worldwide; her brick-and-mortar store, the Sylvia Woods Harp Center, opened in 1992 and was believed to be the largest harp store in the world, with between fifty and 100 harps on the floor at any given time.

In 2013 Woods closed her retail store and moved to the Hawaiian island of Kauai. Her business is now all through her website www.harpcenter.com. She also gives harp lessons worldwide through FaceTime.

On July 23, 2015, Sylvia Woods received the "Lifetime Achievement Award" from the Somerset Folk Harp Festival in Parsippany, New Jersey, for her contributions to the harp world.

== Recordings ==
Woods’ first solo recording was her original composition, The Harp of Brandiswhiere: A Suite for Celtic Harp, which has been acclaimed as an important contribution to contemporary harp literature. Through instrumental music, Woods tells the story of the harp player Brandiswhiere, a legendary hero who saves the world with the music of his harp. The recording has won numerous awards including "Best Fantasy Album" by the Academy of Science Fiction, Fantasy, and Horror Films, and several Popular Music Awards by the American Society of Composers, Authors, and Publishers (ASCAP). Several chapters of the American Harp Society have performed this suite as their major concert of the year. The Brandiswhiere suite has even been choreographed for dance productions in the U.S. and Europe.

Woods' two other solo recordings, Three Harps for Christmas, Volumes 1 and 2, feature traditional Christmas carols from all over the world. These recordings have been played extensively on radio stations across the United States during the Christmas season.

In addition to her solo albums, Woods has played on the recordings of many other prominent musicians such as Jimmy Messina, Al Stewart, Joemy Wilson, Kay Gardener, Aeoleus, Artie Traum & Pat Alger, and Caswell Carnahan.

== Performances ==
Since 1980, Woods has toured as a solo performer, giving concerts throughout North America and Europe, as well as the Republic of Ireland and Northern Ireland. She has given numerous performances for the American Harp Society and the International Society of Folk Harpers and Craftsmen. She has taught harp workshops and masterclasses, and has judged numerous harp competitions, including the Guinness World Trophy for the Celtic Harp Competition in Lorient, France.

To further promote the folk harp and her own music, Woods has appeared on many television and radio shows, including three appearances on the ever-popular radio broadcast A Prairie Home Companion, starring Garrison Keillor. Woods has been interviewed on dozens of radio stations throughout the U.S. and Great Britain, including by Studs Terkel on WFMT in Chicago. Many of Woods’ concerts have been simulcast on radio stations across America.

In January 2003 Woods performed with the Irish band The Chieftains for their five California concerts.

Woods has performed on the soundtracks of several major motion pictures, including Dead Poets Society, Prancer, and Only the Lonely, under the direction of Academy Award-winning composer Maurice Jarre. In addition, Woods has performed on soundtracks for several PBS and commercial television shows.

A 1981 Los Angeles episode of Romper Room that featured Woods and her harp was nominated for an Emmy Award.

== Works ==
=== Books of music for harp ===
- Andrew Lloyd Webber
- Beauty and the Beast
- Chanukah Music For All Harps
- Favorites from the 50s
- Fifty Christmas Carols For All Harps
- Fifty Irish Melodies
- Fifty-Two Scottish Songs
- Forty O’Carolan Tunes
- Four Holiday Favorites
- Gecko Tails (original compositions by Sylvia)
- Groovy Songs of the Sixties
- Harp Fingering Fundamentals
- Harp of Brandiswhiere, The (original compositions by Sylvia)
- Hymns and Wedding Music For All Harps
- Irish Dance Tunes
- Jesu, Joy of Man’s Desiring
- John Denver Love Songs For the Harp
- Lennon and McCartney For the Harp
- Music Theory and Arranging Techniques For Folk Harps
- Pachelbel’s Canon
- Seventy-Six Disney Songs
- Songs of the Harp
- Teach Yourself to Play the Folk Harp
- Twenty-Two Romantic Songs
- Wizard of Oz, The

=== Sheet music for harp ===
- A Charlie Brown Christmas
- A Thousand Years
- All of Me
- All the Pretty Little Horses
- America Medley: America & America the Beautiful
- Brandiswhiere’s Triumphant Return (harp & flute)
- Brave (music from the Disney/Pixar movie)
- Bring Him Home (from Les Miserables)
- Castle on a Cloud (from Les Miserables)
- Dead Poets Society
- Everything
- Fields of Gold
- Fireflies
- Flower Duet
- Frozen (music from the Disney movie)
- Game of Thrones
- Hallelujah
- Happy
- Happy Birthday to You
- Harpers Are Not Bizarre
- Here Comes the Sun
- House at Pooh Corner & Return to Pooh Corner
- How Does a Moment Last Forever
- In the Bleak Midwinter
- In the Forest (harp & flute)
- Into the West (from The Lord of the Rings)
- It's a Beautiful Cay
- La La Land
- Lava
- Love Theme from Titanic: “My Heart Will Go On”
- Marry Me
- Mary, Did You Know?
- Over the Rainbow (from The Wizard of Oz)
- Perfect
- Photograph
- River Flows in You
- Russian Carols Medley (harp & handbells)
- Safe & Sound (from The Hunger Games)
- Say Something
- Simple Gifts
- Spiritual Medley (harp & handbells)
- Spiritual Medley (harp solo)
- Stairway to Heaven
- Star-Spangled Banner, The
- Stay With Me
- Tangled (music from the Disney movie)
- That Night in Bethlehem
- Theme from The Lord of the Rings: “Into the West”
- Two Christmas Medleys
- Unchained Melody
- Unforgettable
- Water Is Wide, The
- Wedding March by Mendelssohn
- When You Say You Love Me
- While My Guitar Gently Weeps
- Winter Bells
- Wizard of Oz, The
- Wondrous Love
- Up (music from the Disney movie)

=== Solo discography ===
- Harp of Brandiswhiere, The
- Three Harps for Christmas, Vol. 1
- Three Harps for Christmas, Vol. 2
