= Journey's Edge =

Studio album by Robin Williamson and his Merry Band
- Released: 1977
- Recorded: March 1975 – January 1977
- Genre: Folk • country folk
- Length: 43:01
- Label: Edsel
- Producer: Robin Williamson

Robin Williamson and his Merry Band chronology
| Myrrh (1972) | Journey's Edge (1977) | American Stonehenge (1978) |

Professional ratings
Review scores
| Source | Rating |
|---|---|
| AllMusic | 3/5 stars |

Journey's Edge is the second solo album by Scottish folk artist Robin Williamson and his Merry Band. The work was released in 1977, and re-released in 2008 by Fledg'ling Records with ten bonus tracks.

Journey's Edge was the beginning of a creative period for Williamson. It is the beginning of Williamson's interest with the harp, then played by Sylvia Woods, and ancient bardic poetry. These new interests would be increasingly evident in later albums and storytelling by Williamson. This is the first post Incredible String Band era album by Williamson. It is a mixture of folk, baroque, pop, and Celtic music. Tracks like "Border Tango" and "Red Eye Blues" deal with remembering and travel. It is not until the track "Tomorrow" that there is a sense of the future. Overall, there is a sense of emotional integrity expressed by Williamson in his vocals that give a deeper meaning to the lighthearted songs. Williamson masterfully prolonged syllables within the tracks that is reminiscent of his Incredible String Band days.

The Merry Band's exceptional musicianship aid in creating the style Williamson had desired in the past. He and the troupe toured regularly in the mid-1970s. The addition of the Celtic style and acoustic ensemble would be a trademark of Williamson and The Merry Band on further works. "Likky Lambert", guesting on the album, is actually former String Band member Licorice McKechnie. Her final recording appearances are on the tracks "Tomorrow" and "The Bells".

== Track listing ==
1. "Border Tango"
2. "The Tune I Hear So Well"
3. "Red Eye Blues"
4. "Tomorrow"
5. "Mythic Times"
6. "Lullaby for a Rainy Night"
7. "Rap City Rhapsody"
8. "The Maharajah of Magador"
9. "The Bells"
10. "Voices of the Barbary Coast"
11. "Out on the Water Coast"

== Personnel ==
- Robin Williamson - Vocals, Guitar, Fiddle, Flute, Mandolin, Percussion
- Sylvia Woods - Glockenspiel, Harp, Harpsichord, Vocals, Celtic Harp, Pedal Harp
- Jerry McMillan - Fiddle, Vocals
- Chris Caswell - Flute, Percussion, Accordion, Concertina, Drums, Gong, Vocals, Wire-Strung Celtic Harp

with

- Mark Bensi - Percussion, Strings, Cymbals, Drums
- Dmitri Bovaird - Viola
- Larry Drummond - Guitar, Mandolin, Mandola, Bell Tree
- John Fare - Cello
- Jamie Faunt - Bass, Fretless Bass
- Jay Hosler - Violin
- Brian Lambert - Guitar
- Gerald Walker - Oboe
- Likki Lambert (Licorice McKechnie) - Vocals
