= Jim Malcolm =

Scottish folk musician

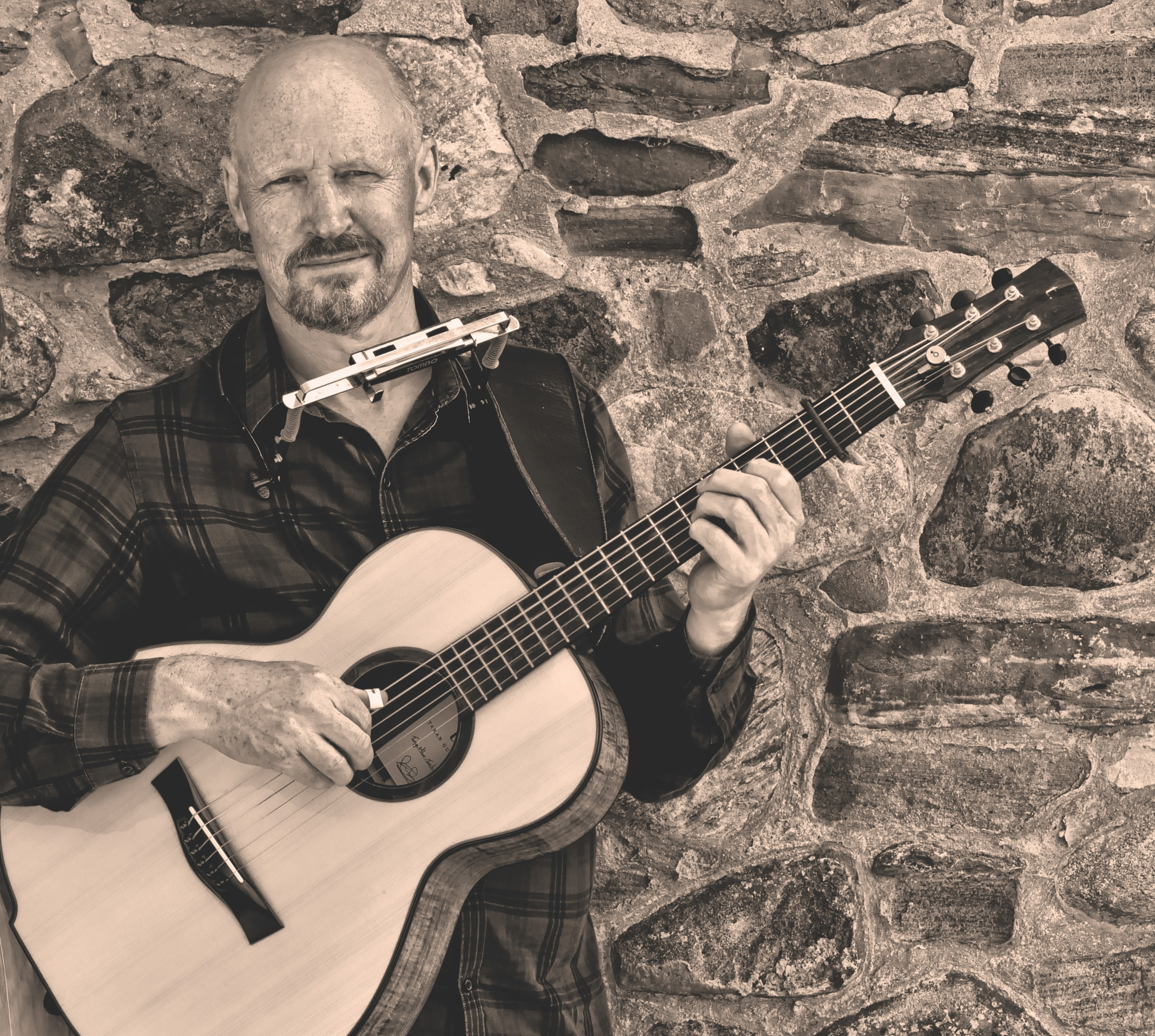

Background information
- Born: James Douglas Malcolm; February 28, 1964 (age 61); Cumbernauld, Scotland
- Genres: Folk, Folk Rock, Traditional Scottish Folk Music
- Occupations: Musician, Songwriter, Producer
- Instruments: Voice, Guitar, Harmonica, Trumpet
- Labels: Beltane Records (own label)
- Formerly of: The Old Blind Dogs
- Spouse: Susan Mary Jean Malcolm (married 1997–present)

Jim Malcolm (born James Douglas Malcolm) is a traditional Scottish folk musician, multi-instrumentalist, songwriter, and recording artist. He was the lead singer of the folk rock band the Old Blind Dogs for eight years, before beginning a solo career.

== Early life ==
Malcolm was born in Cumbernauld, Scotland, in 1964 to parents Helen Grewar and Erick Malcolm. His mother, Helen, was involved in the Traditional Music and Song Association of Scotland. Jim learnt the guitar while at school. After moving to Perth to live with his grandmother, he attended Perth High School.

After secondary school he attended the University of Edinburgh, initially studying Chemistry before switching to a General Arts degree. He started his career as a professional musician after graduating from the university.

== Musical career ==
During his eight years as lead singer of the established folk-rock band the Old Blind Dogs, Malcolm toured various music festivals in Europe and North America.

As a solo musician, Malcolm blends Scots vocals with simultaneous acoustic guitar, and harmonica playing. His work is inspired by old Scots songs, poems, and tunes, and he writes new lyrics for old tunes. Malcolm also draws influence from Scotland's national poet, Robert Burns. He also takes historical inspiration from Scots of the past, such as William Soutar and Tannahill. He has been greatly influenced by Scottish folk musician Jim Reid, a singer and guitarist who died in 2009.

His solo performance style has been summarised as "Scots troubadour", with his music accompanied by stories, historical accounts, and comedy.

=== Highlights ===
- Malcolm was voted Songwriter of the Year at the 2004 Scots Trad Music Awards, and was nominated again in both 2005 and 2008.
- In 2011, Malcolm was accompanied by the Royal Scottish National Orchestra performing two of his songs: Lochanside and Battle of Waterloo, at the Royal Concert Hall in Glasgow.

== Later life ==
In 1997, Malcolm married Scottish folk musician and journalist Susan Mary Jean Allan (1966–present). They live together in Perth, Scotland, and have two children: Elizabeth Andrea Malcolm (1997–present) and Alexander Andrew Malcolm (2001–present). In recent years, Malcolm has begun touring and recording with his wife Susie and occasionally with his daughter Beth.

In 2022, his daughter Beth Malcolm was voted BBC MG ALBA Scots Singer of the Year.

== Discography ==
As of February 2024, Malcolm has released 16 solo albums and one DVD.

Albums
Album	Year released	Label
Sconeward	1995	Greentrax
Rohallion	1998	Greentrax
Resonance	2000	Beltane Records
Home	2002	Beltane Records
Live in Glenfarg	2004	Beltane Records
Tam o' Shanter & Other Tales	2005	Beltane Records
Acquaintance	2007	Beltane Records
The First Cold Day	2009	Beltane Records
Sparkling Flash	2011	Beltane Records
Disaster for Scotland	2012	Beltane Records
Still	2013	Beltane Records
The Corncrake	2014	Beltane Records
Live in Perth	2015	Beltane Records
Spring Will Follow On	2017	Beltane Records
The Berries	2019	Beltane Records
Auld Toon Shuffle	2022	Beltane Records

Films
Film	Year Released	Studios
Bard Hair Day	2012	Red Barn Studios Ltd, Beltane Records Productions
