= Robin Williamson =

Scottish singer songwriter (born 1943)

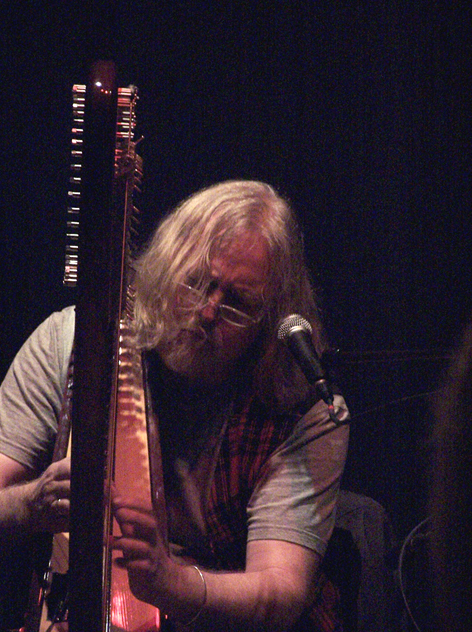
- Williamson performing in 2009

Background information
- Born: Robin Duncan Harry Williamson; 24 November 1943 (age 82); Edinburgh, Scotland
- Genres: Folk, folk rock, psychedelic folk, classical, celtic, world
- Occupations: Singer, songwriter, multi-instrumentalist
- Instruments: Vocals, guitar, harp, violin, flute, tin whistle, keyboards, mandolin, gimbri, bass guitar, cello, oboe, banjo, harmonica
- Years active: 1963–present
- Formerly of: The Incredible String Band

Robin Duncan Harry Williamson (born 24 November 1943) is a Scottish multi-instrumentalist, singer, songwriter, and storyteller who was a founding member of the Incredible String Band, as well as having a solo career.

== Career ==
Williamson lived in the Fairmilehead area of Edinburgh and attended George Watson's College before leaving at the age of 15 to become a professional musician. He performed in local jazz bands with Gerard Dott (later to be a member of the Incredible String Band) before turning to traditional music as a singer and guitarist. By 1961 he had met and begun sharing a flat with Bert Jansch, and in 1963 they travelled to London to play the metropolitan folk circuit. By 1965 he had returned to Edinburgh and formed a duo with Clive Palmer, specializing in fiddle and banjo arrangements of traditional Scottish and Irish songs. Joe Boyd signed them to Elektra Records in 1966, by which time they had hired a third member, Mike Heron. As resident band at Clive's Incredible Folk Club in Glasgow, they called themselves the Incredible String Band.

Between 1966 and 1974 the Incredible String Band, now led by Williamson and Heron, released some 13 albums. The group also included Williamson's girlfriend Licorice McKechnie.

Williamson released his first solo album, Myrrh, in 1971 when still a member of the Incredible String Band. After the band split up in 1974, he began living in Los Angeles and, for a while, turned his attention to writing, co-writing an espionage novel, The Glory Trap. Many of his albums are released by his label, Pig's Whisker Music.

By 1976 he had returned to music, forming the Merry Band with Sylvia Woods (Celtic harp), Jerry McMillan (fiddle), and Chris Caswell (flutes, and wire-strung harp). They toured extensively for three years throughout the US, Canada, and Europe, and released three albums: Journey's Edge, American Stonehenge, and A Glint at the Kindling.

After the breakup of the Merry Band, Williamson returned to the UK and started to tour as a solo act, offering sets dominated by traditional stories set to song. Releases of this period include Songs of Love and Parting and Legacy of the Scottish Harpers. He has also written a tutorial book of English, Welsh, Scottish, and Irish fiddle tunes as well as one for the penny whistle .

Williamson's live album with John Renbourn, Wheel of Fortune (1995), was nominated for a Grammy Award, as was the Incredible String Band album Hangman's Beautiful Daughter in 1968.).

In the late 1990s he took part, with Palmer and Heron, in a reformed Incredible String Band. Williamson left the band some time around the start of 2003. The reformed band disbanded again in 2006.

Williamson resumed his solo career on record with a series of albums for ECM: The Seed-at-Zero (2000), Skirting the River Road (2002), The Iron Stone (2006), and Trusting in the Rising Light (2014). As well as his own words these albums featured material from Dylan Thomas, William Blake, and Walt Whitman.

== Involvement with Scientology ==
Williamson was introduced to Scientology in 1968-1969. In a 1979 interview, he stated:

It's actually a very practical philosophy. It enables you to live slightly better, get on with your fellows slightly better and feel a bit happier about things. That's the reason that I'm interested in it – it's very useable and practical. I've been rather romantic and spiritually inclined. It's probably been helpful to me because of its practicality.

== Solo discography ==
- Myrrh (1972)
- Journey's Edge (1977) (with The Merry Band)
- American Stonehenge (1978) (with The Merry Band)
- A Glint at the Kindling (1979) (with The Merry Band)
- Songs of Love & Parting (1981)
- The Fisherman's Son and the Gruagach of Tricks (1981)
- Prince Dougie and the Swan Maiden (1982)
- Rory Mor and the Gruagach Gaire (1982)
- Music for the Mabinogi (1983)
- Selected Writings (1984)
- Five Humorous Tales of Scotland and Ireland (1984)
- The Dragon Has Two Tongues (1985)
- Five Celtic Tales of Enchantment (1985)
- Five Legendary Histories of Britain (1985)
- Five Bardic Mysteries (1985)
- Five Tales of Prodigies and Marvels (1985)
- Legacy of the Scottish Harpers (1986)
- Legacy of the Scottish Harpers Volume Two (1986)
- Winter's Turning (1986)
- Songs For Children of All Ages (1987)
- Ten of Songs (1988)
- Music for the Newly Born (1990)
- Wheel of Fortune (1995, with John Renbourn)
- The Island of the Strong Door (1996)
- Songs for the Calendarium (1996)
- Farewell Concert at McCabe's (1997, with The Merry Band)
- Mirrorman's Sequences (1997)
- Celtic Harp Airs And Dance Tunes (1997)
- Memories/Erinnerungen (1997)
- Dream Journals (1997)
- Bloomsbury 1997 (1998, with Mike Heron)
- Gems of Celtic Story 1 (1998)
- Ring Dance (1998)
- Gems of Celtic Story 2 (1998)
- A Job of Journey Work (1998)
- The Old Fangled Tone (1999)
- Music For Macbeth (1999)
- At The Pure Fountain (1999, with Clive Palmer)
- The Seed-at-Zero (2000)
- Just Like The Ivy (2000, with Clive Palmer)
- Bloomsbury 2000 (2001, with reformed Incredible String Band)
- Carmina (2001)
- Skirting The River Road (2002)
- Gems of Celtic Story 3 (2002)
- The Iron Stone (2006)
- The Celtic Bard (2008)
- Just Like The River And Other Songs For Guitar (2008)
- Love Will Remain (2012)
- Trusting in the Rising Light (2014)
