= Myrrh (album) =

Studio album by Robin Williamson
- Released: 1972
- Recorded: December 1971
- Genre: Folk
- Length: 39:16
- Label: Edsel
- Producer: Robin Williamson

Robin Williamson chronology
Myrrh (1972)	Journey's Edge (1977)

Professional ratings
Review scores
Source	Rating
AllMusic	4/5 stars

Myrrh is a folk album and the solo debut of Robin Williamson, released in 1972. Robin Williamson is noted as being a founding member of The Incredible String Band. Myrrh was subjected to a low budget and placed on the Island label's lowest sub-label, Help. The album was downgraded by poor-quality sound mixing and a single-sleeve cover design.

As 1971 came to a close, it was evident that The Incredible String Band was drifting into commercial-orientated rock. Williamson was the second member, the other being Mike Heron, to release a solo album. This album is composed of folk songs that are enriched with instrumentals. In many ways it is relatable to The Hangman's Beautiful Daughter. For one, the tracks offer a noble dreamscape with an added effect by the multiple personnel involved in vocal harmonies (including ISB members Licorice McKechnie and Malcolm Le Maistre). They are borderlined by bass and drumming. It also contains Williamson's most extraordinary vocal performances.

Myrrh sold to a larger audience than expected thanks to cheap cost and the Island label that Williamson was signed under. This album was generally favoured thanks to its return to the folk sound fans were so familiar with.

== Track listing ==
All songs written by Robin Williamson, except "Strings in the Earth and Air" by Ivan Pawle.

1. "Strings in the Earth and Air"
2. "Rends-Moi Demain"
3. "The Dancing of the Lord of Weir"
4. "Will We Open the Heavens"
5. "Through the Horned Clouds"
6. "Sandy Land"
7. "Cold Harbour"
8. "Dark Eyed Lady"
9. "Dark Dance"
10. "I See Us All Get Home"

== Personnel ==
- Robin Williamson - Guitar, Vocals, Oboe, Jew's Harp, Gong, Bouzouki, Cello, Violin, Piano, Bass, Flute, Mandolin
- Janet Williamson - Organ, Piano
- Stan Lee Buttons - Organ, Pedal Steel, Bass
- Suzie W.T. - Flute, Soloist
- David Campbell – Viola
- Gerry Conway – Drums
